= 2025 Bank of America Roval 400 =

NASCAR Cup Series race

Race details
- Race 32 of 36 in the 2025 NASCAR Cup Series
- Date: October 5, 2025
- Location: Charlotte Motor Speedway in Concord, North Carolina, U.S.
- Course: Permanent racing facility
- Course length: 2.32 miles (3.73 km)
- Distance: 109 laps, 252.9 mi (407 km)
- Weather: Cloudy with a temperature around 74 °F (23 °C); wind out of the southwest at 5 miles per hour (8.0 km/h).
- Average speed: 81.105 miles per hour (130.526 km/h)

Pole position
| Driver | Tyler Reddick | 23XI Racing |
- Time: 1:25.939

Most laps led
| Driver | Shane van Gisbergen | Trackhouse Racing |
- Laps: 57

Fastest lap
| Driver | Tyler Reddick | 23XI Racing |
- Time: 1:26.738

Winner
| No. 88 | Shane van Gisbergen | Trackhouse Racing |

Television in the United States
- Network: USA
- Announcers: Leigh Diffey, Jeff Burton, and Steve Letarte.
- Nielsen ratings: 0.80 (1.544 million)

Radio in the United States
- Radio: PRN
- Booth announcers: Brad Gillie and Mark Garrow
- Turn announcers: Nick Yeoman (1, 2 & 3), Mark Jaynes (4, 5 & 6), Doug Turnbull (7, 8 & 9), Michael Young (10, 11 & 12) and Pat Patterson (13, 14 & 15)

The 2025 Bank of America Roval 400 was a NASCAR Cup Series race that was held on October 5, 2025, at the Charlotte Motor Speedway infield road course in Concord, North Carolina. Contested over 109 laps on the 2.32-mile (3.73 km) road course, it was the 32nd race of the 2025 NASCAR Cup Series season, the sixth race of the Playoffs, and the final race of the Round of 12.

Shane van Gisbergen won the race. Kyle Larson finished 2nd, and Christopher Bell finished 3rd. Chris Buescher and Michael McDowell rounded out the top five, and Ryan Preece, Daniel Suárez, Chase Elliott, A. J. Allmendinger, and Tyler Reddick rounded out the top ten.

Following the race, Ross Chastain, Tyler Reddick, Bubba Wallace, and Austin Cindric were all eliminated from the playoffs.

This was the final NASCAR race on the Charlotte Roval, as the fall race will return to the oval in 2026.

== Report ==
=== Background ===
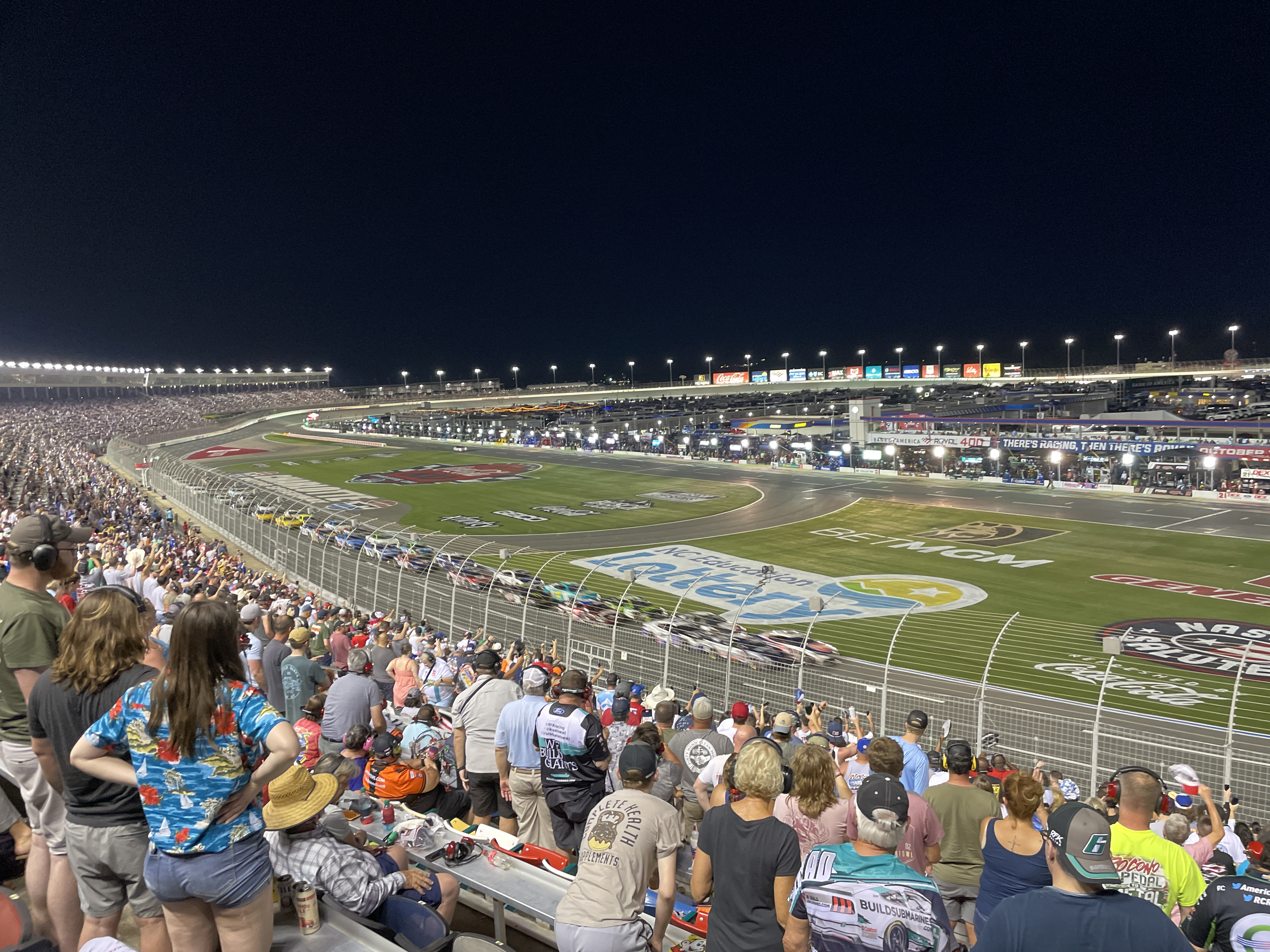
Charlotte Motor Speedway, the track where the race was held.

Since 2018, deviating from past NASCAR events at Charlotte, the race will utilize a road course configuration of Charlotte Motor Speedway, promoted and trademarked as the "Roval". The course is 2.28 miles (3.67 km) in length and features 17 turns, utilizing the infield road course and portions of the oval track. The race will be contested over a scheduled distance of 109 laps, 400 kilometres (250 mi).

During July 2018 tests on the road course, concerns were raised over drivers "cheating" the backstretch chicane on the course. The chicanes were modified with additional tire barriers and rumble strips in order to encourage drivers to properly drive through them, and NASCAR will enforce drive-through penalties on drivers who illegally "short-cut" parts of the course. The chicanes will not be used during restarts. In the summer of 2019, the bus stop on the backstretch was changed and deepened, becoming a permanent part of the circuit, compared to the previous year where it was improvised.

If a driver fails to legally make the backstretch bus stop, the driver must skip the frontstretch chicane and make a complete stop by the dotted line on the exit before being allowed to continue. A driver who misses the frontstretch chicane must stop before the exit.

On May 26, 2024, it was announced that the Charlotte Roval would get a redesign, featuring an updated infield road course which includes an extension of the straightaway after turn 5, a new turn 6, and a sharper hairpin for turn 7, in addition the apex for turn 16 on the final chicane was made tighter.

==== Entry list ====
- (R) denotes rookie driver.
- (P) denotes playoff driver.
- (i) denotes driver who is ineligible for series driver points.

| No. | Driver | Team | Manufacturer |
|---|---|---|---|
| 1 | Ross Chastain (P) | Trackhouse Racing | Chevrolet |
| 2 | Austin Cindric (P) | Team Penske | Ford |
| 3 | Austin Dillon | Richard Childress Racing | Chevrolet |
| 4 | Noah Gragson | Front Row Motorsports | Ford |
| 5 | Kyle Larson (P) | Hendrick Motorsports | Chevrolet |
| 6 | Brad Keselowski | RFK Racing | Ford |
| 7 | Justin Haley | Spire Motorsports | Chevrolet |
| 8 | Kyle Busch | Richard Childress Racing | Chevrolet |
| 9 | Chase Elliott (P) | Hendrick Motorsports | Chevrolet |
| 10 | Ty Dillon | Kaulig Racing | Chevrolet |
| 11 | Denny Hamlin (P) | Joe Gibbs Racing | Toyota |
| 12 | Ryan Blaney (P) | Team Penske | Ford |
| 16 | A. J. Allmendinger | Kaulig Racing | Chevrolet |
| 17 | Chris Buescher | RFK Racing | Ford |
| 19 | Chase Briscoe (P) | Joe Gibbs Racing | Toyota |
| 20 | Christopher Bell (P) | Joe Gibbs Racing | Toyota |
| 21 | Josh Berry | Wood Brothers Racing | Ford |
| 22 | Joey Logano (P) | Team Penske | Ford |
| 23 | Bubba Wallace (P) | 23XI Racing | Toyota |
| 24 | William Byron (P) | Hendrick Motorsports | Chevrolet |
| 34 | Todd Gilliland | Front Row Motorsports | Ford |
| 35 | Riley Herbst (R) | 23XI Racing | Toyota |
| 38 | Zane Smith | Front Row Motorsports | Ford |
| 41 | Cole Custer | Haas Factory Team | Ford |
| 42 | John Hunter Nemechek | Legacy Motor Club | Toyota |
| 43 | Erik Jones | Legacy Motor Club | Toyota |
| 45 | Tyler Reddick (P) | 23XI Racing | Toyota |
| 47 | Ricky Stenhouse Jr. | Hyak Motorsports | Chevrolet |
| 48 | Alex Bowman | Hendrick Motorsports | Chevrolet |
| 51 | Cody Ware | Rick Ware Racing | Ford |
| 54 | Ty Gibbs | Joe Gibbs Racing | Toyota |
| 60 | Ryan Preece | RFK Racing | Ford |
| 66 | Josh Bilicki (i) | Garage 66 | Ford |
| 71 | Michael McDowell | Spire Motorsports | Chevrolet |
| 77 | Carson Hocevar | Spire Motorsports | Chevrolet |
| 88 | Shane van Gisbergen (R) | Trackhouse Racing | Chevrolet |
| 99 | Daniel Suárez | Trackhouse Racing | Chevrolet |
Official entry list

== Practice ==
A. J. Allmendinger was the fastest in the practice session with a time of 1:26.630 seconds and a speed of 94.747 mph (152.481 km/h).

=== Practice results ===
| Pos | No. | Driver | Team | Manufacturer | Time | Speed |
|---|---|---|---|---|---|---|
| 1 | 16 | A. J. Allmendinger | Kaulig Racing | Chevrolet | 1:26.630 | 94.747 |
| 2 | 54 | Ty Gibbs | Joe Gibbs Racing | Toyota | 1:26.667 | 94.707 |
| 3 | 99 | Daniel Suárez | Trackhouse Racing | Chevrolet | 1:26.816 | 94.544 |
Official practice results

== Qualifying ==
Tyler Reddick scored the pole for the race with a time 1:25.939 of and a speed of 95.510 mph (153.708 km/h).

=== Qualifying results ===
| Pos | No. | Driver | Team | Manufacturer | Time | Speed |
|---|---|---|---|---|---|---|
| 1 | 45 | Tyler Reddick (P) | 23XI Racing | Toyota | 1:25.939 | 95.510 |
| 2 | 88 | Shane van Gisbergen (R) | Trackhouse Racing | Chevrolet | 1:25.971 | 95.474 |
| 3 | 54 | Ty Gibbs | Joe Gibbs Racing | Toyota | 1:26.160 | 95.265 |
| 4 | 5 | Kyle Larson (P) | Hendrick Motorsports | Chevrolet | 1:26.306 | 95.103 |
| 5 | 17 | Chris Buescher | RFK Racing | Ford | 1:26.480 | 94.912 |
| 6 | 71 | Michael McDowell | Spire Motorsports | Chevrolet | 1:26.571 | 94.812 |
| 7 | 20 | Christopher Bell (P) | Joe Gibbs Racing | Toyota | 1:26.591 | 94.790 |
| 8 | 19 | Chase Briscoe (P) | Joe Gibbs Racing | Toyota | 1:26.601 | 94.780 |
| 9 | 16 | A. J. Allmendinger | Kaulig Racing | Chevrolet | 1:16.608 | 94.772 |
| 10 | 1 | Ross Chastain (P) | Trackhouse Racing | Chevrolet | 1:26.684 | 94.689 |
| 11 | 12 | Ryan Blaney (P) | Team Penske | Ford | 1:26.770 | 94.595 |
| 12 | 23 | Bubba Wallace (P) | 23XI Racing | Toyota | 1:26.770 | 94.595 |
| 13 | 24 | William Byron (P) | Hendrick Motorsports | Chevrolet | 1:26.809 | 94.552 |
| 14 | 11 | Denny Hamlin (P) | Joe Gibbs Racing | Toyota | 1:26.929 | 94.422 |
| 15 | 9 | Chase Elliott (P) | Hendrick Motorsports | Chevrolet | 1:26.984 | 94.362 |
| 16 | 10 | Ty Dillon | Kaulig Racing | Chevrolet | 1:27.070 | 94.269 |
| 17 | 22 | Joey Logano (P) | Team Penske | Ford | 1:27.075 | 94.264 |
| 18 | 41 | Cole Custer | Haas Factory Team | Ford | 1:27.081 | 94.257 |
| 19 | 2 | Austin Cindric (P) | Team Penske | Ford | 1:27.085 | 94.253 |
| 20 | 99 | Daniel Suárez | Trackhouse Racing | Chevrolet | 1:27.145 | 94.188 |
| 21 | 7 | Justin Haley | Spire Motorsports | Chevrolet | 1:27.176 | 94.154 |
| 22 | 6 | Brad Keselowski | RFK Racing | Ford | 1:27.280 | 94.042 |
| 23 | 35 | Riley Herbst (R) | 23XI Racing | Toyota | 1:27.360 | 93.956 |
| 24 | 38 | Zane Smith | Front Row Motorsports | Ford | 1:27.378 | 93.937 |
| 25 | 48 | Alex Bowman | Hendrick Motorsports | Chevrolet | 1:27.434 | 93.877 |
| 26 | 47 | Ricky Stenhouse Jr. | Hyak Motorsports | Chevrolet | 1:27.445 | 93.865 |
| 27 | 77 | Carson Hocevar | Spire Motorsports | Chevrolet | 1:27.476 | 93.831 |
| 28 | 8 | Kyle Busch | Richard Childress Racing | Chevrolet | 1:27.538 | 93.765 |
| 29 | 60 | Ryan Preece | RFK Racing | Ford | 1:27.643 | 93.653 |
| 30 | 4 | Noah Gragson | Front Row Motorsports | Ford | 1:27.711 | 93.580 |
| 31 | 34 | Todd Gilliland | Front Row Motorsports | Ford | 1:27.736 | 93.553 |
| 32 | 51 | Cody Ware | Rick Ware Racing | Ford | 1:28.145 | 93.119 |
| 33 | 21 | Josh Berry | Wood Brothers Racing | Ford | 1:28.283 | 92.974 |
| 34 | 66 | Josh Bilicki (i) | Garage 66 | Ford | 1:28.611 | 92.630 |
| 35 | 42 | John Hunter Nemechek | Legacy Motor Club | Toyota | 1:29.323 | 91.891 |
| 36 | 3 | Austin Dillon | Richard Childress Racing | Chevrolet | 1:38.038 | 83.723 |
| 37 | 43 | Erik Jones | Legacy Motor Club | Toyota | 0.000 | 0.000 |
Official qualifying results

== Race ==
=== Race results ===
==== Stage results ====
Stage One Laps: 25

| Pos | No | Driver | Team | Manufacturer | Points |
|---|---|---|---|---|---|
| 1 | 88 | Shane van Gisbergen (R) | Trackhouse Racing | Chevrolet | 10 |
| 2 | 5 | Kyle Larson (P) | Hendrick Motorsports | Chevrolet | 9 |
| 3 | 54 | Ty Gibbs | Joe Gibbs Racing | Toyota | 8 |
| 4 | 20 | Christopher Bell (P) | Joe Gibbs Racing | Toyota | 7 |
| 5 | 1 | Ross Chastain (P) | Trackhouse Racing | Chevrolet | 6 |
| 6 | 71 | Michael McDowell | Spire Motorsports | Chevrolet | 5 |
| 7 | 19 | Chase Briscoe (P) | Joe Gibbs Racing | Toyota | 4 |
| 8 | 9 | Chase Elliott (P) | Hendrick Motorsports | Chevrolet | 3 |
| 9 | 24 | William Byron (P) | Hendrick Motorsports | Chevrolet | 2 |
| 10 | 10 | Ty Dillon | Kaulig Racing | Chevrolet | 1 |
Official stage one results

Stage Two Laps: 25

| Pos | No | Driver | Team | Manufacturer | Points |
|---|---|---|---|---|---|
| 1 | 12 | Ryan Blaney (P) | Team Penske | Ford | 10 |
| 2 | 45 | Tyler Reddick (P) | 23XI Racing | Toyota | 9 |
| 3 | 9 | Chase Elliott (P) | Hendrick Motorsports | Chevrolet | 8 |
| 4 | 1 | Ross Chastain (P) | Trackhouse Racing | Chevrolet | 7 |
| 5 | 88 | Shane van Gisbergen (R) | Trackhouse Racing | Chevrolet | 6 |
| 6 | 5 | Kyle Larson (P) | Hendrick Motorsports | Chevrolet | 5 |
| 7 | 20 | Christopher Bell (P) | Joe Gibbs Racing | Toyota | 4 |
| 8 | 22 | Joey Logano (P) | Team Penske | Ford | 3 |
| 9 | 99 | Daniel Suárez | Trackhouse Racing | Chevrolet | 2 |
| 10 | 41 | Cole Custer | Haas Factory Team | Ford | 1 |
Official stage two results

=== Final Stage results ===
Stage Three Laps: 59

| Pos | Grid | No | Driver | Team | Manufacturer | Laps | Points |
|---|---|---|---|---|---|---|---|
| 1 | 2 | 88 | Shane van Gisbergen (R) | Trackhouse Racing | Chevrolet | 109 | 56 |
| 2 | 4 | 5 | Kyle Larson (P) | Hendrick Motorsports | Chevrolet | 109 | 49 |
| 3 | 7 | 20 | Christopher Bell (P) | Joe Gibbs Racing | Toyota | 109 | 45 |
| 4 | 5 | 17 | Chris Buescher | RFK Racing | Ford | 109 | 33 |
| 5 | 6 | 71 | Michael McDowell | Spire Motorsports | Chevrolet | 109 | 37 |
| 6 | 29 | 60 | Ryan Preece | RFK Racing | Ford | 109 | 31 |
| 7 | 20 | 99 | Daniel Suárez | Trackhouse Racing | Chevrolet | 109 | 32 |
| 8 | 15 | 9 | Chase Elliott (P) | Hendrick Motorsports | Chevrolet | 109 | 40 |
| 9 | 9 | 16 | A. J. Allmendinger | Kaulig Racing | Chevrolet | 109 | 28 |
| 10 | 1 | 45 | Tyler Reddick (P) | 23XI Racing | Toyota | 109 | 37 |
| 11 | 13 | 24 | William Byron (P) | Hendrick Motorsports | Chevrolet | 109 | 28 |
| 12 | 3 | 54 | Ty Gibbs | Joe Gibbs Racing | Toyota | 109 | 33 |
| 13 | 11 | 12 | Ryan Blaney (P) | Team Penske | Ford | 109 | 34 |
| 14 | 8 | 19 | Chase Briscoe (P) | Joe Gibbs Racing | Toyota | 109 | 27 |
| 15 | 12 | 23 | Bubba Wallace (P) | 23XI Racing | Toyota | 109 | 22 |
| 16 | 33 | 21 | Josh Berry | Wood Brothers Racing | Ford | 109 | 21 |
| 17 | 31 | 34 | Todd Gilliland | Front Row Motorsports | Ford | 109 | 20 |
| 18 | 25 | 48 | Alex Bowman | Hendrick Motorsports | Chevrolet | 109 | 19 |
| 19 | 26 | 47 | Ricky Stenhouse Jr. | Hyak Motorsports | Chevrolet | 109 | 18 |
| 20 | 17 | 22 | Joey Logano (P) | Team Penske | Ford | 109 | 20 |
| 21 | 10 | 1 | Ross Chastain (P) | Trackhouse Racing | Chevrolet | 109 | 29 |
| 22 | 18 | 41 | Cole Custer | Haas Factory Team | Ford | 109 | 16 |
| 23 | 14 | 11 | Denny Hamlin (P) | Joe Gibbs Racing | Toyota | 109 | 14 |
| 24 | 24 | 38 | Zane Smith | Front Row Motorsports | Ford | 109 | 13 |
| 25 | 21 | 7 | Justin Haley | Spire Motorsports | Chevrolet | 109 | 12 |
| 26 | 35 | 42 | John Hunter Nemechek | Legacy Motor Club | Toyota | 109 | 11 |
| 27 | 16 | 10 | Ty Dillon | Kaulig Racing | Chevrolet | 108 | 11 |
| 28 | 30 | 4 | Noah Gragson | Front Row Motorsports | Ford | 108 | 9 |
| 29 | 27 | 77 | Carson Hocevar | Spire Motorsports | Chevrolet | 108 | 8 |
| 30 | 37 | 43 | Erik Jones | Legacy Motor Club | Toyota | 108 | 7 |
| 31 | 36 | 3 | Austin Dillon | Richard Childress Racing | Chevrolet | 108 | 6 |
| 32 | 34 | 66 | Josh Bilicki (i) | Garage 66 | Ford | 108 | 0 |
| 33 | 32 | 51 | Cody Ware | Rick Ware Racing | Ford | 108 | 4 |
| 34 | 28 | 8 | Kyle Busch | Richard Childress Racing | Chevrolet | 100 | 3 |
| 35 | 22 | 6 | Brad Keselowski | RFK Racing | Ford | 89 | 2 |
| 36 | 19 | 2 | Austin Cindric (P) | Team Penske | Ford | 87 | 1 |
| DSQ | 23 | 35 | Riley Herbst (R) | 23XI Racing | Toyota | 108 | 1 |
Official race results

=== Race statistics ===
- Lead changes: 15 among 6 different drivers
- Cautions/Laps: 3 for 10
- Red flags: 0
- Time of race: 3 hours, 3 minutes, and 51 seconds
- Average speed: 81.105 miles per hour (130.526 km/h)

== Media ==
=== Television ===
USA covered the race on the television side. Leigh Diffey, Jeff Burton, and Steve Letarte called the race from the broadcast booth. Kim Coon, Parker Kligerman, and Marty Snider handled the pit road duties from pit lane.

USA
| Booth announcers | Pit reporters |
|---|---|
| Lap-by-lap: Leigh Diffey; Color-commentator: Jeff Burton; Color-commentator: Steve Letarte | Kim Coon; Parker Kligerman; Marty Snider |

=== Radio ===
The race was broadcast on radio by the Performance Racing Network and simulcast on Sirius XM NASCAR Radio. Brad Gillie and Mark Garrow called the race from the booth when the field will race down the front straightaway. IMS Radio's Nick Yeoman was assigned the entrance to the road course and into the Bank of America bridge (Turns 1–3). Voice of the Indianapolis 500 Mark Jaynes was assigned the action from the Bank of America bridge to the middle of the infield section. Doug Turnbull called the action exiting in infield into the oval Turn 1 banking (Turns 7–9). Michael Young called the action on the backstretch and into the bus stop. Pat Patterson was assigned to the oval Turn 3-4 end. (Turns 13–15). On pit road, PRN were manned by Brett McMillan, Alan Cavanna, Wendy Venturini and Andrew Kurland.

PRN
| Booth announcers | Turn announcers | Pit reporters |
|---|---|---|
| Lead announcer: Brad Gillie; Announcer: Mark Garrow | Infield entrance: Nick Yeoman; Middle of Infield: Mark Jaynes; Exit of Infield: Doug Turnbull; Oval 2 to Bus Stop Michael Young; Oval 3/4: Pat Patterson | Brett McMillan; Alan Cavanna; Wendy Venturini; Andrew Kurland |

== Standings after the race ==
Drivers' Championship standings

| | Pos | Driver | Points |
|---|---|---|---|
| 1 | 1 | Denny Hamlin | 4,036 |
| 4 | 2 | Ryan Blaney | 4,034 (–2) |
| 2 | 3 | Kyle Larson | 4,032 (–4) |
| | 4 | William Byron | 4,032 (–4) |
| 2 | 5 | Christopher Bell | 4,028 (–8) |
| 1 | 6 | Chase Elliott | 4,018 (–18) |
| | 7 | Chase Briscoe | 4,018 (–18) |
| | 8 | Joey Logano | 4,008 (–28) |
| 2 | 9 | Tyler Reddick | 2,187 (–1,849) |
| | 10 | Bubba Wallace | 2,177 (–1,859) |
| 2 | 11 | Ross Chastain | 2,172 (–1,864) |
| 2 | 12 | Shane van Gisbergen | 2,142 (–1,894) |
| | 13 | Alex Bowman | 2,110 (–1,926) |
| 2 | 14 | Austin Cindric | 2,094 (–1,942) |
| | 15 | Austin Dillon | 2,092 (–1,944) |
| | 16 | Josh Berry | 2,078 (–1,958) |
Official driver's standings

Manufacturers' Championship standings

| Pos | Manufacturer | Points |
|---|---|---|
| 1 | Chevrolet | 1,170 |
| 2 | Toyota | 1,140 (–30) |
| 3 | Ford | 1,069 (–101) |

- Note: Only the first 16 positions are included for the driver standings.

| Previous race: 2025 Hollywood Casino 400 | NASCAR Cup Series; 2025 season | Next race: 2025 South Point 400 |
