= Davide Brivio (motorsport) =

Motorsport manager (born 1964)

- Born: 17 July 1964 (age 61); Lecco, Italy
- Occupation: Motorsport team manager

Davide Brivio (born 17 July 1964) is an Italian motorsport manager, currently managing the MotoGP efforts of Trackhouse Racing. He was previously the team manager of Yamaha's World Superbike and MotoGP efforts, as well as Suzuki MotoGP. He formerly held positions as racing director and director of the young driver programme at Alpine F1 Team.

Brivio is one of the most successful team managers in motorcycle Grand Prix racing history, having managed his teams and riders to 6 riders' titles, 4 constructors' titles, and 6 teams' titles.

== Career ==
Having been born and raised in the vicinity of the legendary Monza racetrack, Brivio had an early passion for motorsport and was a keen motocross racer. He became the circuit commentator at his local motocross track and wrote reports for a motorcycle magazine. Brivio graduated from the Istituto Villa Greppi in Monticello Brianza with a diploma in accountancy in 1982.

=== World Superbike ===
Beginning in 1990, Brivio was the press officer for Fabrizio Pirovano in the World Superbike series. In 1992, he became team manager of the Belgarda Yamaha Racing Division in World Superbike. By the end of 1993, he moved to Yamaha Factory Racing in World Superbike, and by 1995 was promoted to team manager, where he remained until the end of 2000. He continued in a consultancy role with the team for 2001.

=== MotoGP ===
==== Yamaha ====
At the end of 2001 Brivio was promoted to team manager of the Yamaha MotoGP efforts. The sport was moving to four-stroke engines for 2002, and he was expected to bring relevant expertise from World Superbike which has used four-stroke engines since the series' inception. Brivio was instrumental in coaxing Valentino Rossi to move away from Honda and join Yamaha in 2004. From 2004 to 2010, Brivio and Yamaha enjoyed success with 5 riders' championships (Rossi in 2004, 2005, 2008, and 2009, and Jorge Lorenzo in 2010) and 4 constructors' championships (2005, 2008, 2009, and 2010).

==== Independent consultant ====
With Rossi's departure from Yamaha to Ducati at the end of 2010, Brivio left Yamaha and became a consultant to Rossi and his VR46 Racing Team and rider development program from 2010 to 2013.

==== Suzuki ====
In 2013, Brivio joined Suzuki MotoGP as testing team manager ahead of their re-entry to the MotoGP class. When in 2014 the manufacturer officially announced their participation in the series starting from 2015, Brivio was named to be team manager of the revamped efforts. Brivio placed a focus on signing younger promising riders from lower classes in order to develop them to fit with the Suzuki team and bike. After a solid first season in 2015 with consistent points finishes for both riders, Brivio and Suzuki experienced their first successes in the class in 2016 with sophomore rider Maverick Viñales taking a podium in the 5th round in France and a win in Great Britain, followed by two more podiums to close out the year. With this success, the team however lost their development concessions, leading to a difficult 2017 with only sporadic points finishes and subsequently regaining their concessions.

A return in form in 2018 saw the team achieve 9 podiums that year, and in 2019 Álex Rins took two wins in America and Great Britain. In 2020, Brivio's efforts came to fruition, with the team taking 2 wins and 11 podiums en route to the teams' championship and a riders' championship for Joan Mir, the first for Suzuki since 2000 with Kenny Roberts Jr. In January 2021, Suzuki and Brivio announced that he would be leaving the Suzuki team and MotoGP as whole.

=== Formula One ===
In January 2021, Brivio became the racing director of Alpine F1 Team. In early 2022, Brivio was moved out of the Formula One team to focus on Alpine's young driver programme and oversee potential forays into other motorsport categories as director of racing expansion projects. In December 2023, Alpine announced that he would be leaving the organization by the end of the year, sparking speculation of a return to MotoGP.

=== Return to MotoGP ===
==== Trackhouse Aprilia ====
Brivio returned to the MotoGP paddock, joining Trackhouse Racing as team principal for its debut season in 2024. With Raúl Fernández's win at the 2025 Australian Grand Prix, Brivio became the first man to win races with three different manufacturers as team principal.

Brivio is set to depart Trackhouse at the end of the 2026 season.

==== Honda HRC ====
In the 2027 season he will join the team Honda HRC in a relevant role.
