= 2026 Cook Out 400 (Martinsville) =

NASCAR Cup Series race

Race details
- Race 7 of 36 in the 2026 NASCAR Cup Series
- Date: March 29, 2025
- Location: Martinsville Speedway in Ridgeway, Virginia
- Course: Permanent racing facility
- Course length: 0.526 miles (0.847 km)
- Distance: 400 laps, 210.4 mi (338.606 km)
- Weather: Clear 63 °F (17 °C)
- Average speed: 75.457 miles per hour (121.436 km/h)

Pole position
Driver	Denny Hamlin	Joe Gibbs Racing
- Time: 19.275

Most laps led
Driver	Denny Hamlin	Joe Gibbs Racing
- Laps: 292

Fastest lap
Driver	Denny Hamlin	Joe Gibbs Racing
- Time: 19.788

Winner
No. 9	Chase Elliott	Hendrick Motorsports

Television in the United States
- Network: FS1
- Announcers: Mike Joy, Clint Bowyer, and Kevin Harvick

Radio in the United States
- Radio: MRN
- Booth announcers: Alex Hayden, Mike Bagley, and Todd Gordon
- Turn announcers: Dave Moody (1 & 2) and Tim Catafalmo (3 & 4)

The 2026 Cook Out 400 was a NASCAR Cup Series race held on March 29, 2026, at Martinsville Speedway in Ridgeway, Virginia. Contested over 400 laps on the 0.526-mile (0.847 km) paperclip-shaped oval, it was the seventh race of the 2026 NASCAR Cup Series season.

Chase Elliott won the race. Denny Hamlin finished 2nd, and Joey Logano finished 3rd. Ty Gibbs and William Byron rounded out the top five, and Ryan Blaney, Christopher Bell, Austin Cindric, Kyle Larson, and Josh Berry rounded out the top ten.

== Report ==
=== Background ===
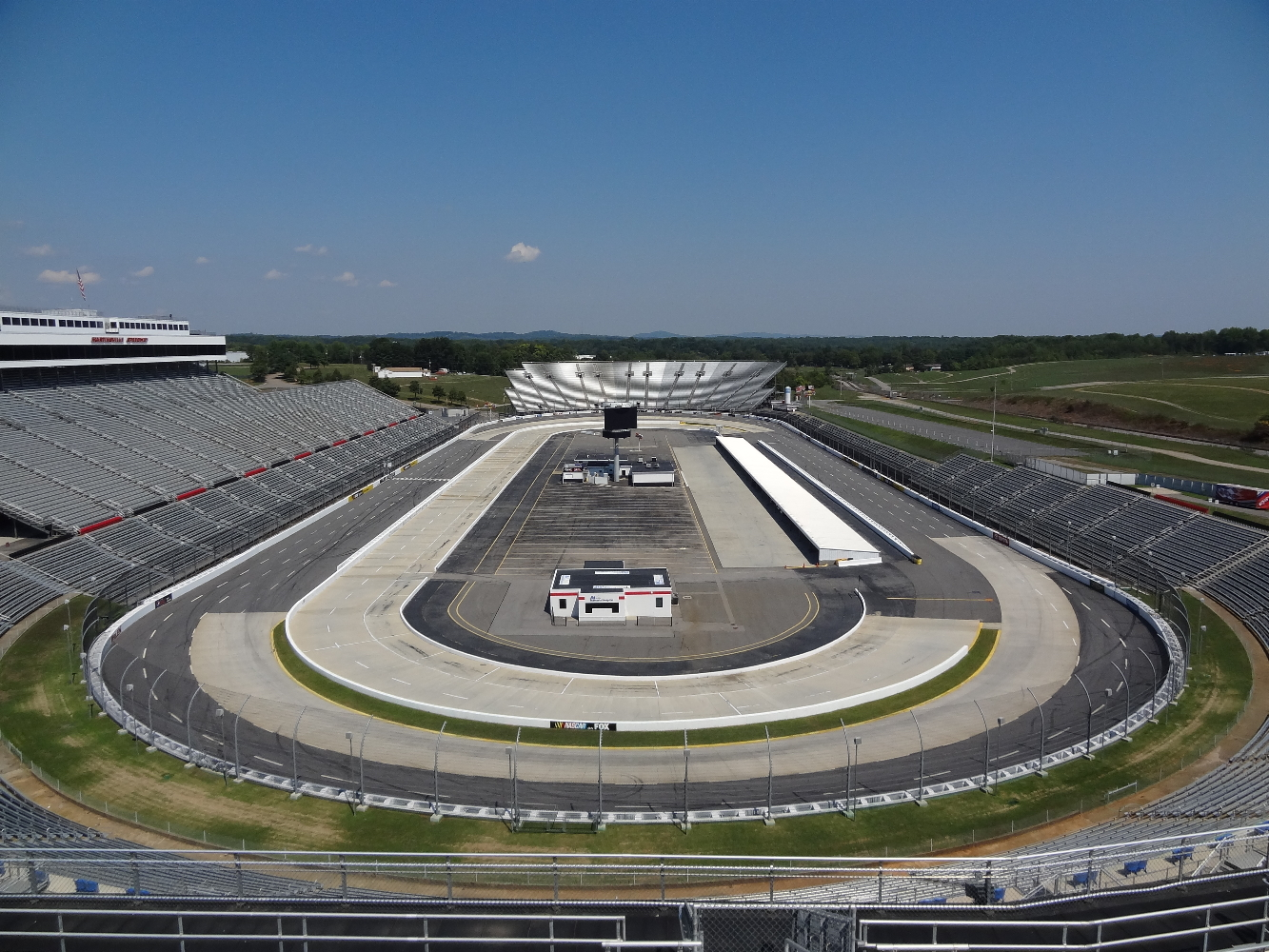
Martinsville Speedway, the track where the race was held.

Martinsville Speedway is a NASCAR-owned stock car racing track located in Henry County, in Ridgeway, Virginia, just to the south of Martinsville. At 0.526 miles (0.847 km) in length, it is the shortest track in the NASCAR Cup Series. The track was also one of the first paved oval tracks in NASCAR, being built in 1947 by H. Clay Earles. It is also the only remaining race track on the NASCAR circuit since its beginning in 1948.

==== Entry list ====
- (R) denotes rookie driver.
- (i) denotes driver who is ineligible for series driver points.

No.	Driver	Team	Manufacturer
1	Ross Chastain	Trackhouse Racing	Chevrolet
2	Austin Cindric	Team Penske	Ford
3	Austin Dillon	Richard Childress Racing	Chevrolet
4	Noah Gragson	Front Row Motorsports	Ford
5	Kyle Larson	Hendrick Motorsports	Chevrolet
6	Brad Keselowski	RFK Racing	Ford
7	Daniel Suárez	Spire Motorsports	Chevrolet
8	Kyle Busch	Richard Childress Racing	Chevrolet
9	Chase Elliott	Hendrick Motorsports	Chevrolet
10	Ty Dillon	Kaulig Racing	Chevrolet
11	Denny Hamlin	Joe Gibbs Racing	Toyota
12	Ryan Blaney	Team Penske	Ford
16	A. J. Allmendinger	Kaulig Racing	Chevrolet
17	Chris Buescher	RFK Racing	Ford
19	Chase Briscoe	Joe Gibbs Racing	Toyota
20	Christopher Bell	Joe Gibbs Racing	Toyota
21	Josh Berry	Wood Brothers Racing	Ford
22	Joey Logano	Team Penske	Ford
23	Bubba Wallace	23XI Racing	Toyota
24	William Byron	Hendrick Motorsports	Chevrolet
33	Austin Hill (i)	Richard Childress Racing	Chevrolet
34	Todd Gilliland	Front Row Motorsports	Ford
35	Riley Herbst	23XI Racing	Toyota
38	Zane Smith	Front Row Motorsports	Ford
41	Cole Custer	Haas Factory Team	Chevrolet
42	John Hunter Nemechek	Legacy Motor Club	Toyota
43	Erik Jones	Legacy Motor Club	Toyota
45	Tyler Reddick	23XI Racing	Toyota
47	Ricky Stenhouse Jr.	Hyak Motorsports	Chevrolet
48	Justin Allgaier (i)	Hendrick Motorsports	Chevrolet
51	Cody Ware	Rick Ware Racing	Chevrolet
54	Ty Gibbs	Joe Gibbs Racing	Toyota
60	Ryan Preece	RFK Racing	Ford
71	Michael McDowell	Spire Motorsports	Chevrolet
77	Carson Hocevar	Spire Motorsports	Chevrolet
88	Connor Zilisch (R)	Trackhouse Racing	Chevrolet
97	Shane van Gisbergen	Trackhouse Racing	Chevrolet
Official entry list

Alex Bowman, the original driver of the No. 48, was sidelined for the race due to vertigo sustained at Austin.

== Practice ==
Bubba Wallace was the fastest in the practice session with a time of 19.685 seconds and a speed of 96.195 mph (154.811 km/h).

=== Practice results ===
Pos	No.	Driver	Team	Manufacturer	Time	Speed
1	23	Bubba Wallace	23XI Racing	Toyota	19.685	96.195
2	54	Ty Gibbs	Joe Gibbs Racing	Toyota	19.701	96.117
3	11	Denny Hamlin	Joe Gibbs Racing	Toyota	19.732	95.966
Official practice results

== Qualifying ==
Denny Hamlin scored the pole for the race with a time of 19.275 and a speed of 98.241 mph (158.104 km/h).

=== Qualifying results ===
Pos	No.	Driver	Team	Manufacturer	Time	Speed
1	11	Denny Hamlin	Joe Gibbs Racing	Toyota	19.275	98.241
2	24	William Byron	Hendrick Motorsports	Chevrolet	19.331	97.957
3	21	Josh Berry	Wood Brothers Racing	Ford	19.334	97.941
4	54	Ty Gibbs	Joe Gibbs Racing	Toyota	19.338	97.921
5	97	Shane van Gisbergen	Trackhouse Racing	Chevrolet	19.339	97.916
6	2	Austin Cindric	Team Penske	Ford	19.351	97.855
7	77	Carson Hocevar	Spire Motorsports	Chevrolet	19.363	97.795
8	45	Tyler Reddick	23XI Racing	Toyota	19.376	97.729
9	22	Joey Logano	Team Penske	Ford	19.389	97.664
10	9	Chase Elliott	Hendrick Motorsports	Chevrolet	19.392	97.649
11	20	Christopher Bell	Joe Gibbs Racing	Toyota	19.398	97.618
12	12	Ryan Blaney	Team Penske	Ford	19.429	97.463
13	5	Kyle Larson	Hendrick Motorsports	Chevrolet	19.432	97.448
14	38	Zane Smith	Front Row Motorsports	Ford	19.444	97.387
15	23	Bubba Wallace	23XI Racing	Toyota	19.445	97.382
16	17	Chris Buescher	RFK Racing	Ford	19.446	97.377
17	60	Ryan Preece	RFK Racing	Ford	19.453	97.342
18	1	Ross Chastain	Trackhouse Racing	Chevrolet	19.457	97.322
19	43	Erik Jones	Legacy Motor Club	Toyota	19.486	97.177
20	71	Michael McDowell	Spire Motorsports	Chevrolet	19.495	97.133
21	48	Justin Allgaier (i)	Hendrick Motorsports	Chevrolet	19.503	97.093
22	7	Daniel Suárez	Spire Motorsports	Chevrolet	19.508	97.068
23	6	Brad Keselowski	RFK Racing	Ford	19.518	97.018
24	41	Cole Custer	Haas Factory Team	Chevrolet	19.530	96.959
25	88	Connor Zilisch (R)	Trackhouse Racing	Chevrolet	19.536	96.929
26	35	Riley Herbst	23XI Racing	Toyota	19.561	96.805
27	19	Chase Briscoe	Joe Gibbs Racing	Toyota	19.562	96.800
28	16	A. J. Allmendinger	Kaulig Racing	Chevrolet	19.578	96.721
29	34	Todd Gilliland	Front Row Motorsports	Ford	19.588	96.671
30	3	Austin Dillon	Richard Childress Racing	Chevrolet	19.625	96.489
31	4	Noah Gragson	Front Row Motorsports	Ford	19.650	96.366
32	42	John Hunter Nemechek	Legacy Motor Club	Toyota	19.664	96.298
33	47	Ricky Stenhouse Jr.	Hyak Motorsports	Chevrolet	19.676	96.239
34	8	Kyle Busch	Richard Childress Racing	Chevrolet	19.705	96.097
35	51	Cody Ware	Rick Ware Racing	Chevrolet	19.719	96.029
36	10	Ty Dillon	Kaulig Racing	Chevrolet	19.760	95.830
37	33	Austin Hill (i)	Richard Childress Racing	Chevrolet	19.921	95.055
Official qualifying results

== Race ==
=== Race results ===
==== Stage results ====
Stage One Laps: 80

Pos	No	Driver	Team	Manufacturer	Points
1	11	Denny Hamlin	Joe Gibbs Racing	Toyota	10
2	24	William Byron	Hendrick Motorsports	Chevrolet	9
3	21	Josh Berry	Wood Brothers Racing	Ford	8
4	54	Ty Gibbs	Joe Gibbs Racing	Toyota	7
5	2	Austin Cindric	Team Penske	Ford	6
6	97	Shane van Gisbergen	Trackhouse Racing	Chevrolet	5
7	22	Joey Logano	Team Penske	Ford	4
8	12	Ryan Blaney	Team Penske	Ford	3
9	45	Tyler Reddick	23XI Racing	Toyota	2
10	60	Ryan Preece	RFK Racing	Ford	1

Stage Two Laps: 100

Pos	No	Driver	Team	Manufacturer	Points
1	11	Denny Hamlin	Joe Gibbs Racing	Toyota	10
2	54	Ty Gibbs	Joe Gibbs Racing	Toyota	9
3	22	Joey Logano	Team Penske	Ford	8
4	12	Ryan Blaney	Team Penske	Ford	7
5	24	William Byron	Hendrick Motorsports	Chevrolet	6
6	2	Austin Cindric	Team Penske	Ford	5
7	45	Tyler Reddick	23XI Racing	Toyota	4
8	97	Shane van Gisbergen	Trackhouse Racing	Chevrolet	3
9	5	Kyle Larson	Hendrick Motorsports	Chevrolet	2
10	21	Josh Berry	Wood Brothers Racing	Ford	1

=== Final Stage results ===
Stage Three Laps: 220

Pos	Grid	No	Driver	Team	Manufacturer	Laps	Points
1	10	9	Chase Elliott	Hendrick Motorsports	Chevrolet	400	55
2	1	11	Denny Hamlin	Joe Gibbs Racing	Toyota	400	56
3	9	22	Joey Logano	Team Penske	Ford	400	46
4	4	54	Ty Gibbs	Joe Gibbs Racing	Toyota	400	49
5	2	24	William Byron	Hendrick Motorsports	Chevrolet	400	47
6	12	12	Ryan Blaney	Team Penske	Ford	400	41
7	11	20	Christopher Bell	Joe Gibbs Racing	Toyota	400	30
8	6	2	Austin Cindric	Team Penske	Ford	400	40
9	13	5	Kyle Larson	Hendrick Motorsports	Chevrolet	400	30
10	3	21	Josh Berry	Wood Brothers Racing	Ford	400	36
11	5	97	Shane van Gisbergen	Trackhouse Racing	Chevrolet	400	34
12	17	60	Ryan Preece	RFK Racing	Ford	400	26
13	23	6	Brad Keselowski	RFK Racing	Ford	400	24
14	27	19	Chase Briscoe	Joe Gibbs Racing	Toyota	400	23
15	8	45	Tyler Reddick	23XI Racing	Toyota	400	28
16	18	1	Ross Chastain	Trackhouse Racing	Chevrolet	400	21
17	7	77	Carson Hocevar	Spire Motorsports	Chevrolet	400	20
18	20	71	Michael McDowell	Spire Motorsports	Chevrolet	400	19
19	16	17	Chris Buescher	RFK Racing	Ford	399	18
20	22	7	Daniel Suárez	Spire Motorsports	Chevrolet	399	17
21	19	43	Erik Jones	Legacy Motor Club	Toyota	399	16
22	21	48	Justin Allgaier (i)	Hendrick Motorsports	Chevrolet	398	0
23	29	34	Todd Gilliland	Front Row Motorsports	Ford	398	14
24	34	8	Kyle Busch	Richard Childress Racing	Chevrolet	398	13
25	30	3	Austin Dillon	Richard Childress Racing	Chevrolet	398	12
26	25	88	Connor Zilisch (R)	Trackhouse Racing	Chevrolet	397	11
27	28	16	A. J. Allmendinger	Kaulig Racing	Chevrolet	397	10
28	31	4	Noah Gragson	Front Row Motorsports	Ford	397	9
29	32	42	John Hunter Nemechek	Legacy Motor Club	Toyota	397	8
30	33	47	Ricky Stenhouse Jr.	Hyak Motorsports	Chevrolet	397	7
31	24	41	Cole Custer	Haas Factory Team	Chevrolet	396	6
32	35	51	Cody Ware	Rick Ware Racing	Ford	394	5
33	37	33	Austin Hill (i)	Richard Childress Racing	Chevrolet	394	0
34	14	38	Zane Smith	Front Row Motorsports	Ford	371	3
35	26	35	Riley Herbst	23XI Racing	Toyota	323	2
36	15	23	Bubba Wallace	23XI Racing	Toyota	323	1
37	36	10	Ty Dillon	Kaulig Racing	Chevrolet	298	1
Official race results

=== Race statistics ===
- Lead changes: 8 among 6 different drivers
- Cautions/Laps: 5 for 54 laps
- Red flags: 0
- Time of race: 2 hours, 47 minutes, and 18 seconds
- Average speed: 75.457 miles per hour (121.436 km/h)

== Media ==
=== Television ===
The race was carried by FS1 in the United States. Mike Joy, Clint Bowyer, and Kevin Harvick called the race from the broadcast booth. Jamie Little and Regan Smith handled the pit road for the television side. Larry McReynolds provided insight on-site during the race.

FS1
Booth announcers	Pit reporters	In-race analyst
Lap-by-lap: Mike Joy; Color-commentator: Clint Bowyer; Color-commentator: Kevin Harvick	Jamie Little; Regan Smith	Larry McReynolds

=== Radio ===
MRN was the radio call for the race, which was also simulcast on Sirius XM NASCAR Radio.

MRN Radio
Booth announcers	Turn announcers	Pit reporters
Lead announcer: Alex Hayden; Announcer: Mike Bagley; Announcer: Todd Gordon	Turns 1 & 2: Dave Moody; Turns 3 & 4: Tim Catafalmo	Steve Post; Chris Wilner

== Standings after the race ==
Drivers' Championship standings

	Pos	Driver	Points
	1	Tyler Reddick	353
	2	Ryan Blaney	271 (–82)
1	3	Denny Hamlin	259 (–94)
1	4	Chase Elliott	249 (–104)
1	5	William Byron	238 (–115)
5	6	Ty Gibbs	222 (–131)
1	7	Christopher Bell	212 (–141)
1	8	Brad Keselowski	206 (–147)
1	9	Kyle Larson	206 (–147)
3	10	Chris Buescher	206 (–147)
8	11	Bubba Wallace	206 (–147)
4	12	Joey Logano	185 (–168)
1	13	Ryan Preece	180 (–173)
1	14	Shane van Gisbergen	174 (–179)
2	15	Carson Hocevar	171 (–182)
2	16	Daniel Suárez	167 (–186)
Official driver's standings

Manufacturers' Championship standings

	Pos	Manufacturer	Points
	1	Toyota	345
1	2	Chevrolet	261 (–84)
1	3	Ford	248 (–97)

- Note: Only the first 16 positions are included for the driver standings.

Previous race: 2026 Goodyear 400	NASCAR Cup Series; 2026 season	Next race: 2026 Food City 500
