= 2026 Food City 500 =

Race details
- Race 8 of 36 in the 2026 NASCAR Cup Series
- Date: April 12, 2026
- Location: Bristol Motor Speedway in Bristol, Tennessee
- Course: Permanent racing facility
- Course length: 0.533 miles (0.858 km)
- Distance: 505 laps, 269.165 mi (429 km)
- Scheduled distance: 500 laps, 266.5 mi (433.29 km)
- Weather: Clear 80 °F (27 °C)
- Average speed: 88.817 miles per hour (142.937 km/h)

Pole position
Driver	Ryan Blaney	Team Penske
- Time: 15.101

Most laps led
Driver	Kyle Larson	Hendrick Motorsports
- Laps: 284

Fastest lap
Driver	Ryan Blaney	Team Penske
- Time: 15.554

Winner
No. 54	Ty Gibbs	Joe Gibbs Racing

Television in the United States
- Network: FS1
- Announcers: Mike Joy, Clint Bowyer, and Kevin Harvick
- Nielsen ratings: 1.09 (1.945 million)

Radio in the United States
- Radio: PRN
- Booth announcers: Brad Gillie and Nick Yeoman
- Turn announcers: Pat Patterson (Backstretch)

The 2026 Food City 500 was a NASCAR Cup Series race that was held on April 12, 2026, at Bristol Motor Speedway in Bristol, Tennessee. Contested over 505 laps on the 0.533 miles (0.858 km) short track, extended from the original 500 laps due to a overtime finish, it was the 8th race of the 2026 NASCAR Cup Series season.

Ty Gibbs won the race for his first career NASCAR Cup Series win. Ryan Blaney finished 2nd, and Kyle Larson finished 3rd. Tyler Reddick and Chase Briscoe rounded out the top five, and Todd Gilliland, Joey Logano, Ryan Preece, Denny Hamlin, and Carson Hocevar rounded out the top ten.

== Report ==
=== Background ===
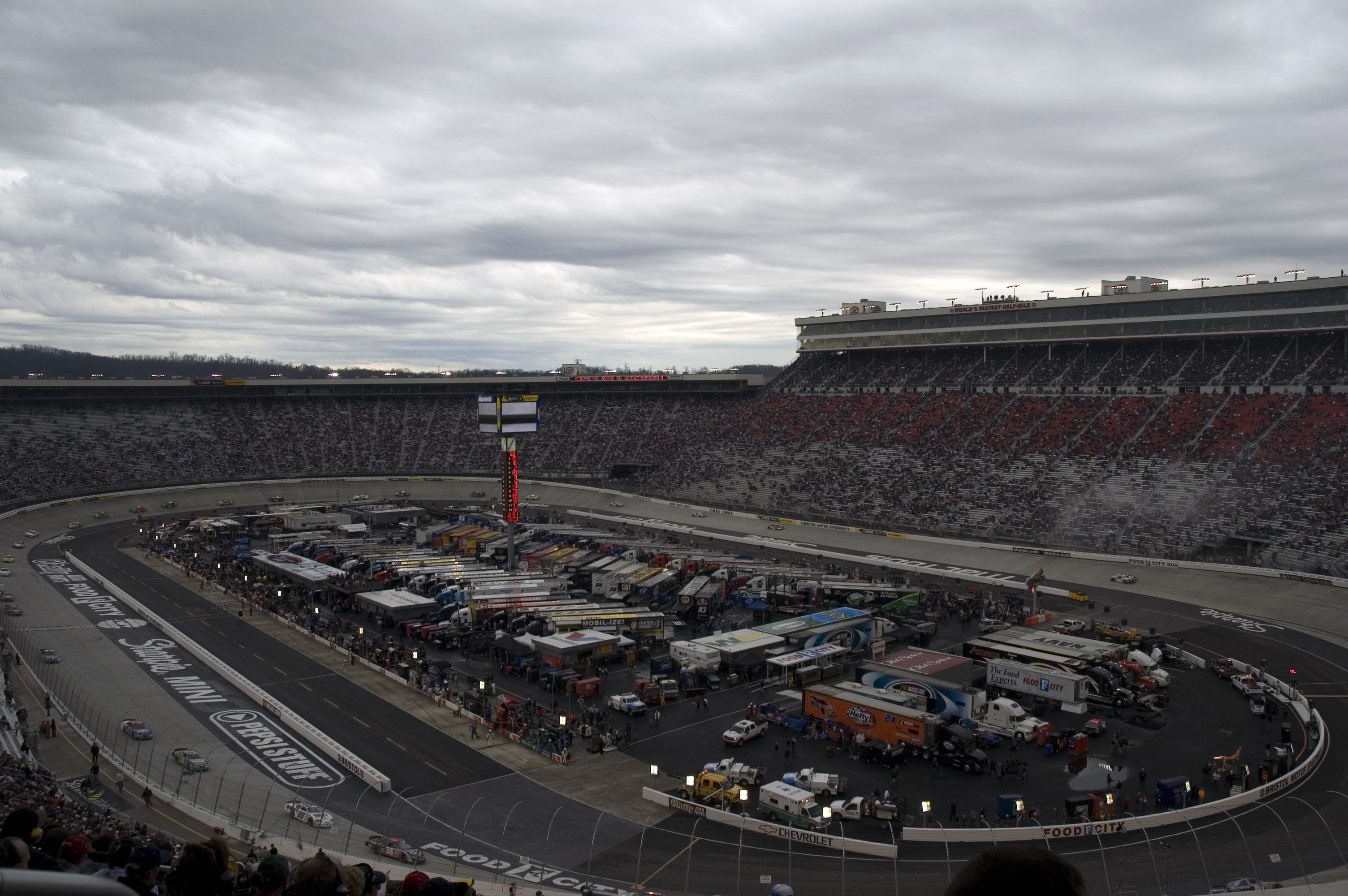
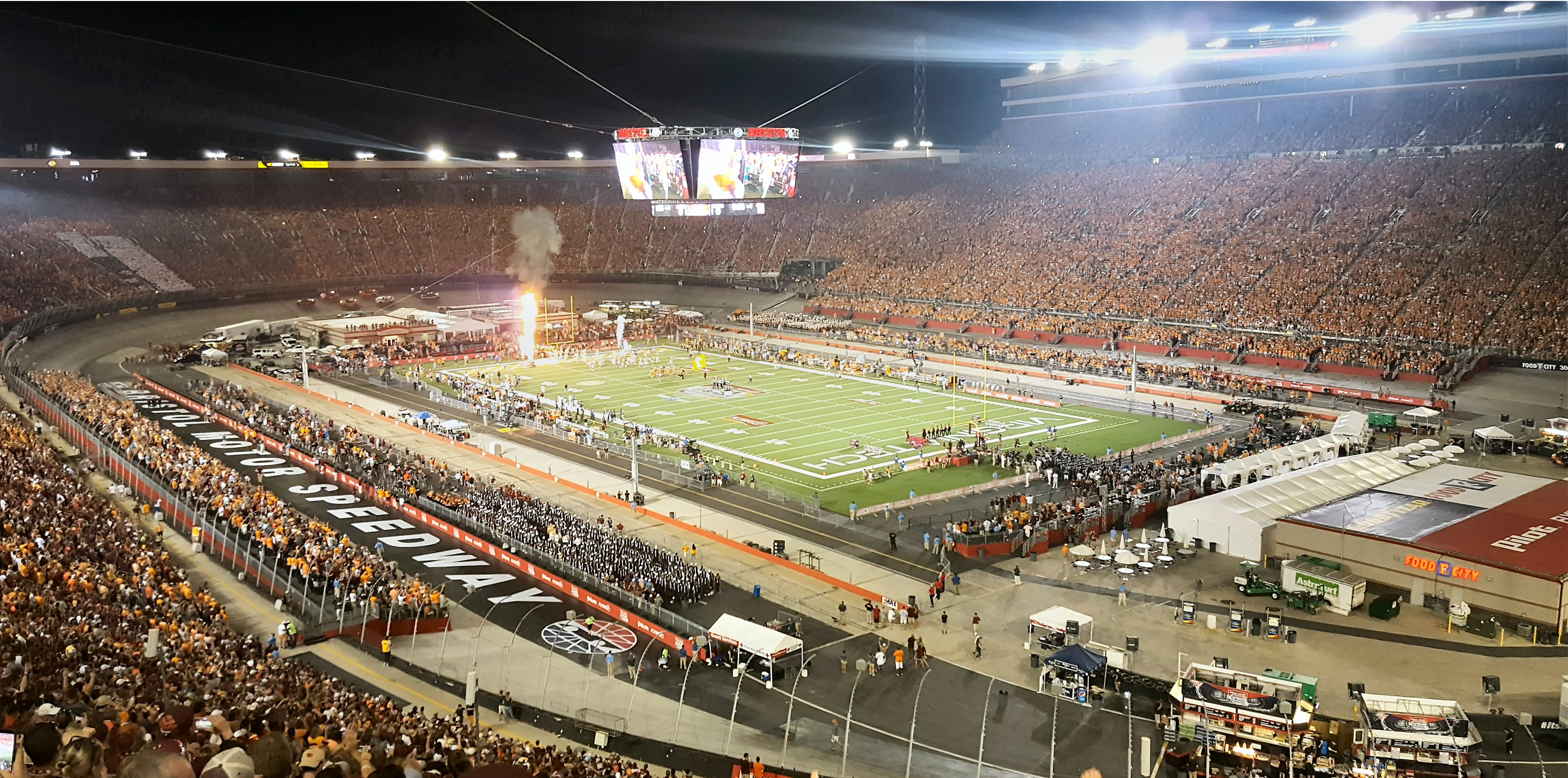
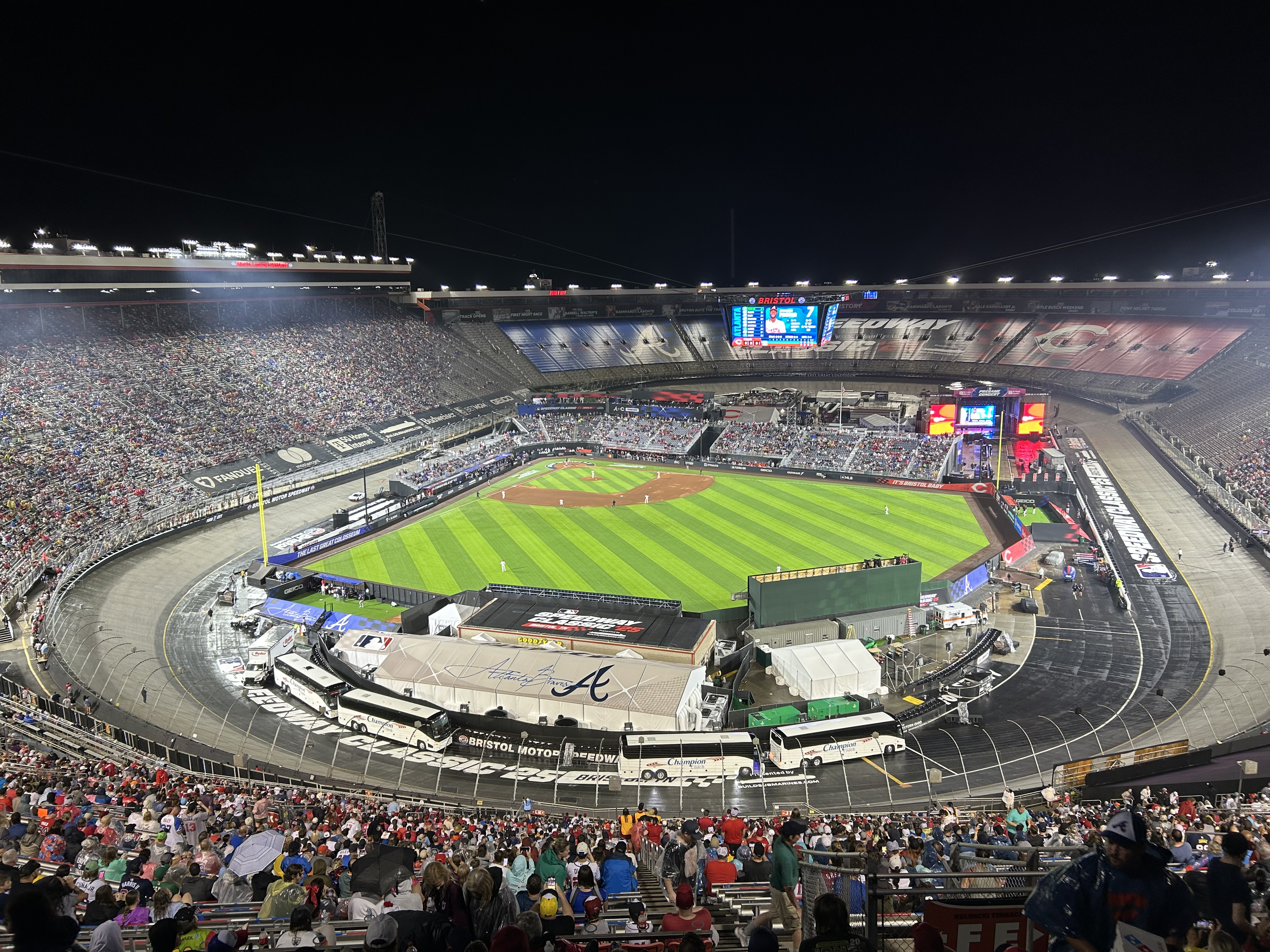
The Track (left) the Battle at Bristol (center) and the MLB Speedway Classic (right), are all events previously held at Bristol Motor Speedway.

The Bristol Motor Speedway, formerly known as Bristol International Raceway and Bristol Raceway, is a NASCAR short track venue located in Bristol, Tennessee. Constructed in 1960, it held its first NASCAR race on July 30, 1961. Despite its short length, Bristol is among the most popular tracks on the NASCAR schedule because of its distinct features, which include extraordinarily steep banking, an all concrete surface, two pit roads, and stadium-like seating. It has also been named one of the loudest NASCAR tracks.

Besides holding racing events, the track has hosted the Battle at Bristol, a college football game between the Tennessee Volunteers and Virginia Tech Hokies on September 10, 2016, and the MLB Speedway Classic, an MLB baseball game between the Atlanta Braves and the Cincinnati Reds from August 2-3, 2025.

==== Entry list ====
- (R) denotes rookie driver.
- (i) denotes driver who is ineligible for series driver points.

No.	Driver	Team	Manufacturer
1	Ross Chastain	Trackhouse Racing	Chevrolet
2	Austin Cindric	Team Penske	Ford
3	Austin Dillon	Richard Childress Racing	Chevrolet
4	Noah Gragson	Front Row Motorsports	Ford
5	Kyle Larson	Hendrick Motorsports	Chevrolet
6	Brad Keselowski	RFK Racing	Ford
7	Daniel Suárez	Spire Motorsports	Chevrolet
8	Kyle Busch	Richard Childress Racing	Chevrolet
9	Chase Elliott	Hendrick Motorsports	Chevrolet
10	Ty Dillon	Kaulig Racing	Chevrolet
11	Denny Hamlin	Joe Gibbs Racing	Toyota
12	Ryan Blaney	Team Penske	Ford
16	A. J. Allmendinger	Kaulig Racing	Chevrolet
17	Chris Buescher	RFK Racing	Ford
19	Chase Briscoe	Joe Gibbs Racing	Toyota
20	Christopher Bell	Joe Gibbs Racing	Toyota
21	Josh Berry	Wood Brothers Racing	Ford
22	Joey Logano	Team Penske	Ford
23	Bubba Wallace	23XI Racing	Toyota
24	William Byron	Hendrick Motorsports	Chevrolet
34	Todd Gilliland	Front Row Motorsports	Ford
35	Riley Herbst	23XI Racing	Toyota
38	Zane Smith	Front Row Motorsports	Ford
41	Cole Custer	Haas Factory Team	Chevrolet
42	John Hunter Nemechek	Legacy Motor Club	Toyota
43	Erik Jones	Legacy Motor Club	Toyota
45	Tyler Reddick	23XI Racing	Toyota
47	Ricky Stenhouse Jr.	Hyak Motorsports	Chevrolet
48	Alex Bowman	Hendrick Motorsports	Chevrolet
51	Cody Ware	Rick Ware Racing	Chevrolet
54	Ty Gibbs	Joe Gibbs Racing	Toyota
60	Ryan Preece	RFK Racing	Ford
66	Chad Finchum (i)	Garage 66	Ford
71	Michael McDowell	Spire Motorsports	Chevrolet
77	Carson Hocevar	Spire Motorsports	Chevrolet
88	Connor Zilisch (R)	Trackhouse Racing	Chevrolet
97	Shane van Gisbergen	Trackhouse Racing	Chevrolet
Official entry list

== Practice ==
Ricky Stenhouse Jr. was the fastest in the practice session with a time of 15.403 seconds and a speed of 124.573 mph (200.481 km/h).

=== Practice results ===
Pos	No.	Driver	Team	Manufacturer	Time	Speed
1	47	Ricky Stenhouse Jr.	Hyak Motorsports	Chevrolet	15.403	124.573
2	4	Noah Gragson	Front Row Motorsports	Ford	15.439	124.283
3	2	Austin Cindric	Team Penske	Ford	15.451	124.186
Official practice results

== Qualifying ==
Ryan Blaney scored the pole for the race with a time of 15.101 and a speed of 127.064 mph (204.490 km/h).

=== Qualifying results ===
Pos	No.	Driver	Team	Manufacturer	Time	Speed
1	12	Ryan Blaney	Team Penske	Ford	15.101	127.064
2	45	Tyler Reddick	23XI Racing	Toyota	15.124	126.871
3	19	Chase Briscoe	Joe Gibbs Racing	Toyota	15.135	126.779
4	35	Riley Herbst	23XI Racing	Toyota	15.147	126.679
5	54	Ty Gibbs	Joe Gibbs Racing	Toyota	15.164	126.537
6	1	Ross Chastain	Trackhouse Racing	Chevrolet	15.175	126.445
7	17	Chris Buescher	RFK Racing	Ford	15.190	126.320
8	5	Kyle Larson	Hendrick Motorsports	Chevrolet	15.192	126.303
9	2	Austin Cindric	Team Penske	Ford	15.200	126.237
10	77	Carson Hocevar	Spire Motorsports	Chevrolet	15.201	126.229
11	11	Denny Hamlin	Joe Gibbs Racing	Toyota	15.225	126.030
12	23	Bubba Wallace	23XI Racing	Toyota	15.231	125.980
13	7	Daniel Suárez	Spire Motorsports	Chevrolet	15.233	125.963
14	20	Christopher Bell	Joe Gibbs Racing	Toyota	15.261	125.732
15	38	Zane Smith	Front Row Motorsports	Ford	15.277	125.601
16	4	Noah Gragson	Front Row Motorsports	Ford	15.279	125.584
17	60	Ryan Preece	RFK Racing	Ford	15.282	125.559
18	9	Chase Elliott	Hendrick Motorsports	Chevrolet	15.285	125.535
19	71	Michael McDowell	Spire Motorsports	Chevrolet	15.291	125.486
20	22	Joey Logano	Team Penske	Ford	15.311	125.322
21	6	Brad Keselowski	RFK Racing	Ford	15.312	125.313
22	16	A. J. Allmendinger	Kaulig Racing	Chevrolet	15.323	125.224
23	47	Ricky Stenhouse Jr.	Hyak Motorsports	Chevrolet	15.331	125.158
24	3	Austin Dillon	Richard Childress Racing	Chevrolet	15.344	125.052
25	21	Josh Berry	Wood Brothers Racing	Ford	15.364	124.889
26	88	Connor Zilisch (R)	Trackhouse Racing	Chevrolet	15.368	124.857
27	48	Alex Bowman	Hendrick Motorsports	Chevrolet	15.368	124.857
28	43	Erik Jones	Legacy Motor Club	Toyota	15.378	124.776
29	8	Kyle Busch	Richard Childress Racing	Chevrolet	15.389	124.686
30	41	Cole Custer	Haas Factory Team	Chevrolet	15.404	124.565
31	42	John Hunter Nemechek	Legacy Motor Club	Toyota	15.467	124.058
32	10	Ty Dillon	Kaulig Racing	Chevrolet	15.498	123.810
33	97	Shane van Gisbergen	Trackhouse Racing	Chevrolet	15.514	123.682
34	24	William Byron	Hendrick Motorsports	Chevrolet	15.554	123.364
35	34	Todd Gilliland	Front Row Motorsports	Ford	15.593	123.055
36	51	Cody Ware	Rick Ware Racing	Chevrolet	15.613	122.898
37	66	Chad Finchum (i)	Garage 66	Ford	15.711	122.131
Official qualifying results

== Race ==
=== Race results ===
==== Stage Results ====
Stage One Laps: 125

Pos	No	Driver	Team	Manufacturer	Points
1	5	Kyle Larson	Hendrick Motorsports	Chevrolet	10
2	20	Christopher Bell	Joe Gibbs Racing	Toyota	9
3	12	Ryan Blaney	Team Penske	Ford	8
4	19	Chase Briscoe	Joe Gibbs Racing	Toyota	7
5	21	Josh Berry	Wood Brothers Racing	Ford	6
6	11	Denny Hamlin	Joe Gibbs Racing	Toyota	5
7	77	Carson Hocevar	Spire Motorsports	Chevrolet	4
8	35	Riley Herbst	23XI Racing	Toyota	3
9	23	Bubba Wallace	23XI Racing	Toyota	2
10	2	Austin Cindric	Team Penske	Ford	1

Stage Two Laps: 125

Pos	No	Driver	Team	Manufacturer	Points
1	5	Kyle Larson	Hendrick Motorsports	Chevrolet	10
2	12	Ryan Blaney	Team Penske	Ford	9
3	11	Denny Hamlin	Joe Gibbs Racing	Toyota	8
4	77	Carson Hocevar	Spire Motorsports	Chevrolet	7
5	19	Chase Briscoe	Joe Gibbs Racing	Toyota	6
6	21	Josh Berry	Wood Brothers Racing	Ford	5
7	54	Ty Gibbs	Joe Gibbs Racing	Toyota	4
8	22	Joey Logano	Team Penske	Ford	3
9	23	Bubba Wallace	23XI Racing	Toyota	2
10	2	Austin Cindric	Team Penske	Ford	1

=== Final Stage Results ===
Stage Three Laps: 250

Pos	Grid	No	Driver	Team	Manufacturer	Laps	Points
1	5	54	Ty Gibbs	Joe Gibbs Racing	Toyota	505	59
2	1	12	Ryan Blaney	Team Penske	Ford	505	53
3	8	5	Kyle Larson	Hendrick Motorsports	Chevrolet	505	54
4	2	45	Tyler Reddick	23XI Racing	Toyota	505	33
5	3	19	Chase Briscoe	Joe Gibbs Racing	Toyota	505	45
6	35	34	Todd Gilliland	Front Row Motorsports	Ford	505	31
7	20	22	Joey Logano	Team Penske	Ford	505	33
8	17	60	Ryan Preece	RFK Racing	Ford	505	29
9	11	11	Denny Hamlin	Joe Gibbs Racing	Toyota	505	41
10	10	77	Carson Hocevar	Spire Motorsports	Chevrolet	505	38
11	12	23	Bubba Wallace	23XI Racing	Toyota	505	30
12	13	7	Daniel Suárez	Spire Motorsports	Chevrolet	505	25
13	7	17	Chris Buescher	RFK Racing	Ford	505	24
14	21	6	Brad Keselowski	RFK Racing	Ford	505	23
15	22	16	A. J. Allmendinger	Kaulig Racing	Chevrolet	505	22
16	9	2	Austin Cindric	Team Penske	Ford	505	23
17	23	47	Ricky Stenhouse Jr.	Hyak Motorsports	Chevrolet	504	20
18	24	3	Austin Dillon	Richard Childress Racing	Chevrolet	504	19
19	15	38	Zane Smith	Front Row Motorsports	Ford	504	18
20	6	1	Ross Chastain	Trackhouse Racing	Chevrolet	504	17
21	4	35	Riley Herbst	23XI Racing	Toyota	504	19
22	18	9	Chase Elliott	Hendrick Motorsports	Chevrolet	504	15
23	28	43	Erik Jones	Legacy Motor Club	Toyota	503	14
24	19	71	Michael McDowell	Spire Motorsports	Chevrolet	503	13
25	29	8	Kyle Busch	Richard Childress Racing	Chevrolet	503	12
26	16	4	Noah Gragson	Front Row Motorsports	Ford	503	11
27	14	20	Christopher Bell	Joe Gibbs Racing	Toyota	501	19
28	30	41	Cole Custer	Haas Factory Team	Chevrolet	501	9
29	32	10	Ty Dillon	Kaulig Racing	Chevrolet	501	8
30	34	24	William Byron	Hendrick Motorsports	Chevrolet	500	7
31	36	51	Cody Ware	Rick Ware Racing	Chevrolet	500	6
32	25	21	Josh Berry	Wood Brothers Racing	Ford	490	16
33	26	88	Connor Zilisch (R)	Trackhouse Racing	Chevrolet	478	4
34	33	97	Shane van Gisbergen	Trackhouse Racing	Chevrolet	335	3
35	31	42	John Hunter Nemechek	Legacy Motor Club	Toyota	324	2
36	37	66	Chad Finchum (i)	Garage 66	Ford	239	0
37	27	48	Alex Bowman	Hendrick Motorsports	Chevrolet	160	1
Official race results

=== Race statistics ===
- Lead changes: 12 among 4 different drivers
- Cautions/Laps: 9 for 72 laps
- Red flags: 0
- Time of race: 3 hours, 1 minute and 50 seconds
- Average speed: 88.817 miles per hour (142.937 km/h)
- Margin of victory: 0.055 seconds

== Media ==
=== Television ===
The race was carried by FS1 in the United States. Mike Joy, Clint Bowyer, and three-time Bristol winner Kevin Harvick called the race from the broadcast booth. Jamie Little, Regan Smith and Josh Sims handled pit road for the television side, and Larry McReynolds provided insight on-site during the race.

FS1
Booth announcers	Pit reporters	In-race analyst
Lap-by-lap: Mike Joy; Color-commentator: Clint Bowyer; Color-commentator: Kevin Harvick	Jamie Little; Regan Smith; Josh Sims	Larry McReynolds

=== Radio ===
PRN had the radio call for the race which was simulcasted on Sirius XM NASCAR Radio. Brad Gillie and Nick Yeoman called the race in the booth when the field raced down the frontstretch. Pat Patterson called the race from atop the turn 3 suites when the field raced down the backstretch. Andrew Kurland, Brett McMillan, David Styles and Doug Turnbull covered the action on pit lane for PRN.

PRN
Booth announcers	Turn announcers	Pit reporters
Lead announcer: Brad Gillie; Announcer: Nick Yeoman	Backstretch: Pat Patterson	Andrew Kurland; Brett McMillan; David Styles; Doug Turnbull

== Standings after the race ==
Drivers' Championship standings

	Pos	Driver	Points
	1	Tyler Reddick	386
	2	Ryan Blaney	324 (–62)
	3	Denny Hamlin	300 (–86)
2	4	Ty Gibbs	281 (–105)
1	5	Chase Elliott	264 (–122)
3	6	Kyle Larson	260 (–126)
2	7	William Byron	245 (–141)
3	8	Bubba Wallace	236 (–150)
2	9	Christopher Bell	231 (–155)
	10	Chris Buescher	230 (–156)
3	11	Brad Keselowski	229 (–157)
	12	Joey Logano	218 (–168)
2	13	Carson Hocevar	209 (–177)
1	14	Ryan Preece	209 (–177)
1	15	Daniel Suárez	192 (–194)
2	16	Shane van Gisbergen	177 (–209)
Official driver's standings

Manufacturers' Championship standings

Pos	Manufacturer	Points
1	Toyota	400
2	Chevrolet	295 (–105)
3	Ford	283 (–117)

- Note: Only the first 16 positions are included for the driver standings.

Previous race: 2026 Cook Out 400 (Martinsville)	NASCAR Cup Series; 2026 season	Next race: 2026 AdventHealth 400
