= Trackhouse Racing =

American motorsports team

- Owner(s): Justin Marks; Avenue Sports Fund
- Principal: Justin Marks
- Base: Concord, North Carolina, U.S.
- Series: NASCAR Cup Series; MotoGP
- Race drivers: NASCAR Cup Series: 1. Ross Chastain; 88. Connor Zilisch; 97. Shane van Gisbergen; MotoGP: 25. Raúl Fernández; 79. Ai Ogura
- Manufacturer: NASCAR: Chevrolet; MotoGP: Aprilia; IMSA: Chevrolet
- Opened: NASCAR: 2020; MotoGP: 2024; IMSA: 2025
- Website: trackhouse.com

Career
- Debut: NASCAR Cup Series: 2021 Daytona 500 (Daytona); MotoGP: 2024 Qatar Airways Grand Prix of Qatar; IMSA: 2025 24 Hours of Daytona (Daytona)
- Latest race: NASCAR Cup Series: 2026 Season Finale 400 (Homestead); MotoGP: 2026 Pertamina Grand Prix of Indonesia; IMSA: 2025 24 Hours of Daytona (Daytona)
- Races competed: NASCAR Cup Series: 216; MotoGP: 59; IMSA: 1
- Drivers' Championships: 0
- Race victories: NASCAR Cup Series: 16; MotoGP: 3 IMSA: 0
- Pole positions: NASCAR Cup Series: 10; MotoGP: 2 IMSA: 0

Trackhouse Racing is an American motorsports organization that competes full time in the NASCAR Cup Series and MotoGP.

== History ==
After Leavine Family Racing announced the sale of its assets in summer 2020, former NASCAR Cup Series driver and former World of Outlaws and K&N Pro Series East team owner Justin Marks placed a bid on the sale. LFR eventually sold their assets to Spire Motorsports. On August 14, Marks confirmed the creation of his own team, Trackhouse, and revealed that former Dale Earnhardt Incorporated executive Ty Norris had been brought on to help run the team. At that time, Marks had yet to strike a formal alliance with any manufacturer or team, but already had one potential sponsor lined up. From his ownership of a go-kart track and other family business ventures, Marks had the financial wherewithal to purchase a team without other means. Marks aimed to be an unconventional team owner, with plans to use his team ownership platform as an advocate for STEM education.

On September 17, 2024, it was reported that Ty Norris left the team and was headed to Kaulig Racing.

== Ownership ==
The team is owned by Trackhouse Entertainment Group, a venture of Justin Marks and Avenue Sports Fund. The team was also previously partially owned by Grammy Award–winning rapper Armando Christian "Pitbull" Pérez.

On February 14, 2025, Pitbull announced on his X account that his partnership and ownership status of the organization had been terminated effective immediately. No further reason was given.

=== Acquisitions ===
On January 9, 2023, a consortium consisting of Trackhouse, DEJ Management, Jeff Burton Autosports, Inc., and Kevin Harvick Incorporated purchased the CARS Tour.

== NASCAR ==
On June 10, Marks told SiriusXM NASCAR Radio that the team may expand to a two-car operation in 2022. On June 30, 2021, Trackhouse announced their purchase of the NASCAR operations of Chip Ganassi Racing and along with it, its two charters for the No. 1 and the No. 42 teams, therefore announcing the team will be two cars in 2022. On September 16, Trackhouse signed a multi-year deal with 2022 NASCAR Camping World Truck Series champion Zane Smith. As part of a partnership deal, Smith would drive Spire Motorsports' third team in 2024, and was expected to join Trackhouse full-time in a third team in 2025, though was released from his contract. On January 11, 2024, Trackhouse announced that they would be hiring Connor Zilisch to a multi-year deal that includes him running in the NASCAR Xfinity Series, NASCAR Craftsman Truck Series, ARCA Menards Series, CARS Tour, Trans-Am Series, and IMSA in 2024 and 2025.

The organization currently fields three full-time Chevrolet Camaro ZL1 cars: the No. 1 for Ross Chastain, the No. 88 for Connor Zilisch, and the No. 97 for Shane van Gisbergen.

=== Car No. 1 history ===
Ross Chastain (2022–present)

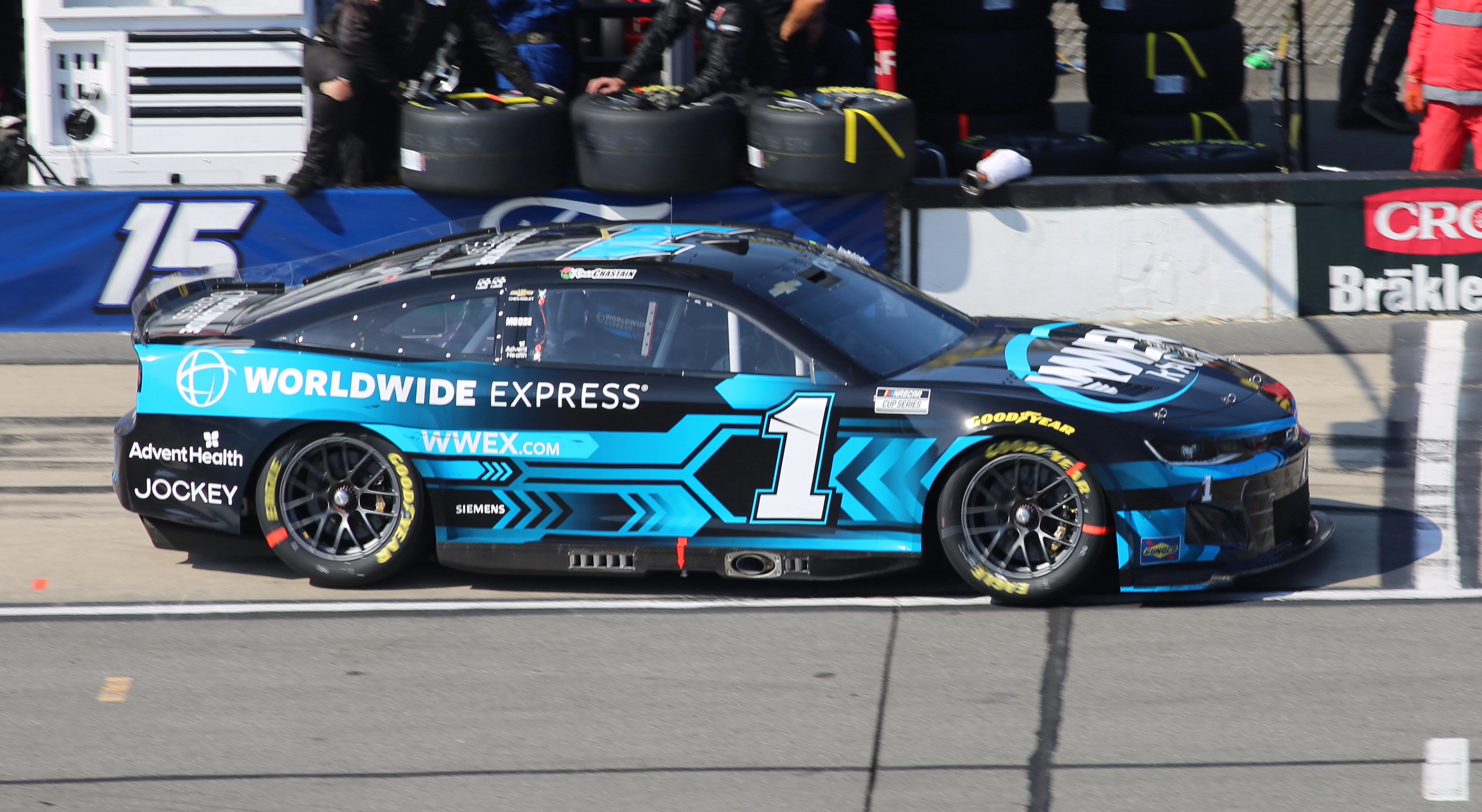
Ross Chastain in the No. 1 at Pocono Raceway in 2022

On August 3, 2021, the team announced that Ross Chastain would drive their second car, the No. 1, in 2022.

Chastain began the 2022 season with a 40th place finish at the 2022 Daytona 500 and a 29th place finish at Fontana. He then rebounded with a third place finish at Las Vegas and two runner-up finishes at Phoenix and Atlanta. Chastain scored his first career cup win and Trackhouse's first ever win at COTA. A month later, he claimed his second victory at Talladega. At the 2022 NASCAR All-Star Race, Chastain finished 22nd after going airborne from colliding with Kyle Busch, taking Chase Elliott out in the process. At the Indianapolis road course, Chastain crossed the line second to Tyler Reddick, but was penalized and scored 27th place for crossing the access road during the final restart. Chastain made the Championship 4 after the "Hail Melon" move at Martinsville by driving along the outside wall at full throttle, slingshotting his way to overtake Denny Hamlin and finish fifth. Chastain would be credited a finish of fourth after Brad Keselowski was disqualified following post-race tech inspection due to his car failing to meet the minimum weight requirement. He finished third at the Phoenix finale and a career-best second place in the points standings.

Chastain started the 2023 season with a ninth-place finish at the 2023 Daytona 500. Shortly after finishing fifth at Kansas, Noah Gragson confronted him over a racing incident between them that resulted in Gragson hitting the outside wall. Gragson shoved Chastain, who retaliated with a punch to the face. Chastain scored his first win of the season at Nashville. On July 11, Anheuser-Busch announced it signed a multi-year sponsorship deal with the No. 1 starting in 2024, ending its ten-year partnership with the Stewart–Haas Racing No. 4 at the end of the season. Chastain was eliminated from the Round of 12 at the conclusion of the Charlotte Roval race, but won the season finale at Phoenix and finished ninth in the points standings.

Chastain started the 2024 season with a 21st place finish at the 2024 Daytona 500. He was winless during the regular season and missed the playoffs after lower-ranked Harrison Burton of Wood Brothers Racing and Chase Briscoe of Stewart–Haas Racing won races. Nevertheless, Chastain won during the Round of 12 at Kansas. Following the Martinsville playoff race, the No. 1 was docked fifty owner and driver points and Chastain and the team were each fined US$100,000 for race manipulation, when Chastain and fellow Chevrolet driver Austin Dillon formed a blockade to allow William Byron to make the Championship 4. In addition, Surgen was suspended for the Phoenix finale.

Chastain started the 2025 season with a 40th place DNF at the 2025 Daytona 500. He scored his first win of the season at the 2025 Coca-Cola 600.

==== Car No. 1 results ====
Year	Driver	No.	Make	1	2	3	4	5	6	7	8	9	10	11	12	13	14	15	16	17	18	19	20	21	22	23	24	25	26	27	28	29	30	31	32	33	34	35	36	Owners	Pts
2022	Ross Chastain	1	Chevy	DAY; 40	CAL; 29	LVS; 3*	PHO; 2	ATL; 2	COA; 1*	RCH; 19	MAR; 5	BRD; 33	TAL; 1	DOV; 3	DAR; 30	KAN; 7	CLT; 15	GTW; 8	SON; 7	NSH; 5	ROA; 4	ATL; 2	NHA; 8	POC; 32	IRC; 27	MCH; 24	RCH; 18	GLN; 21	DAY; 33	DAR; 20	KAN; 7	BRI; 6	TEX; 13	TAL; 4*	ROV; 37	LVS; 2	HOM; 2	MAR; 4	PHO; 3	2nd	5034
2023	Ross Chastain	1	Chevy	DAY; 9	CAL; 3*	LVS; 12	PHO; 24	ATL; 13	COA; 4	RCH; 3	BRD; 28	MAR; 13	TAL; 23	DOV; 2	KAN; 5	DAR; 29	CLT; 22	GTW; 22	SON; 10	NSH; 1*	CSC; 22	ATL; 35	NHA; 23	POC; 13	RCH; 24	MCH; 7	IRC; 17	GLN; 18	DAY; 17	DAR; 5	KAN; 13	BRI; 23	TEX; 2	TAL; 37	ROV; 10	LVS; 5	HOM; 31	MAR; 14	PHO; 1*	9th	2299
2024	Ross Chastain	1	Chevy	DAY; 21	ATL; 7	LVS; 4	PHO; 6	BRI; 15	COA; 7	RCH; 15	MAR; 14	TEX; 32	TAL; 13	DOV; 12	KAN; 19	DAR; 11	CLT; 8	GTW; 12	SON; 5	IOW; 11	NHA; 10	NSH; 33	CSC; 22	POC; 36	IND; 15	RCH; 5	MCH; 25	DAY; 12	DAR; 5	ATL; 13	GLN; 4*	BRI; 10	KAN; 1	TAL; 40	ROV; 28	LVS; 7	HOM; 33	MAR; 8	PHO; 19	19th	852
2025	Ross Chastain	1	Chevy	DAY; 40	ATL; 8	COA; 12	PHO; 11	LVS; 5	HOM; 31	MAR; 6	DAR; 7	BRI; 7	TAL; 20	TEX; 2	KAN; 18	CLT; 1	NSH; 11	MCH; 6	MXC; 16	POC; 26	ATL; 33	CSC; 10	SON; 24	DOV; 33	IND; 39	IOW; 11	GLN; 10	RCH; 19	DAY; 15	DAR; 11	GTW; 24	BRI; 19	NHA; 9	KAN; 11	ROV; 21	LVS; 23	TAL; 13	MAR; 4	PHO; 13	10th	2272
2026	Ross Chastain	1	Chevy	DAY; 20	ATL; 3	COA; 35	PHO; 28	LVS; 17	DAR; 16	MAR; 16	BRI; 20	KAN; 26	TAL; 7	TEX; 26	GLN; 27	CLT; 35	NSH; 37	MCH; 16	POC; 8	COR; 7	SON; 14	CHI; 18	ATL; 11	NWS; 27	IND; 23	IOW; 7	RCH; 12	NHA; 36	DAY; 24	DAR; 27	GTW; 5	BRI; 12	KAN; 15	LVS; 30	CLT; 16	PHO; 9	TAL; 4	MAR; 11	HOM; 27	18th	752
2027	Ross Chastain	1	Chevy	DAY	ATL	COA	PHO	LVS	DAR	BRI	MAR	TAL	TEX	KAN	DOV	CLT	NSH	POC	MCH	CHI	IOW	SON	ATL	IND	COR	BRI	GTW	DAY	DAR	RCH	GLN	NHA	KAN	LVS	CLT	PHO	TAL	MAR	HOM	-	-

=== Car No. 87 history ===
Part-time with Connor Zilisch (2025)

On January 23, 2025, it was announced that Connor Zilisch would make his Cup Series debut at Austin in the No. 87 car. He went on to make an appearance at the 2025 Coca-Cola 600 and has additional starts scheduled for the 2025 season through his sponsor Red Bull. The team withdrew the entry from the race at Watkins Glen International following Zilisch suffering a broken collarbone from a fall while celebrating winning the NASCAR Xfinity Series race held that weekend.

==== Car No. 87 results ====
Year	Driver	No.	Make	1	2	3	4	5	6	7	8	9	10	11	12	13	14	15	16	17	18	19	20	21	22	23	24	25	26	27	28	29	30	31	32	33	34	35	36	Owners	Pts
2025	Connor Zilisch	87	Chevy	DAY	ATL	COA; 37	PHO	LVS	HOM	MAR	DAR	BRI	TAL	TEX	KAN	CLT; 23	NSH	MCH	MXC	POC	ATL; 11	CSC	SON	DOV	IND	IOW	GLN; Wth	RCH	DAY	DAR	GTW	BRI	NHA	KAN	ROV	LVS	TAL	MAR	PHO	43rd	41

=== Car No. 88 history ===
Shane van Gisbergen (2025)

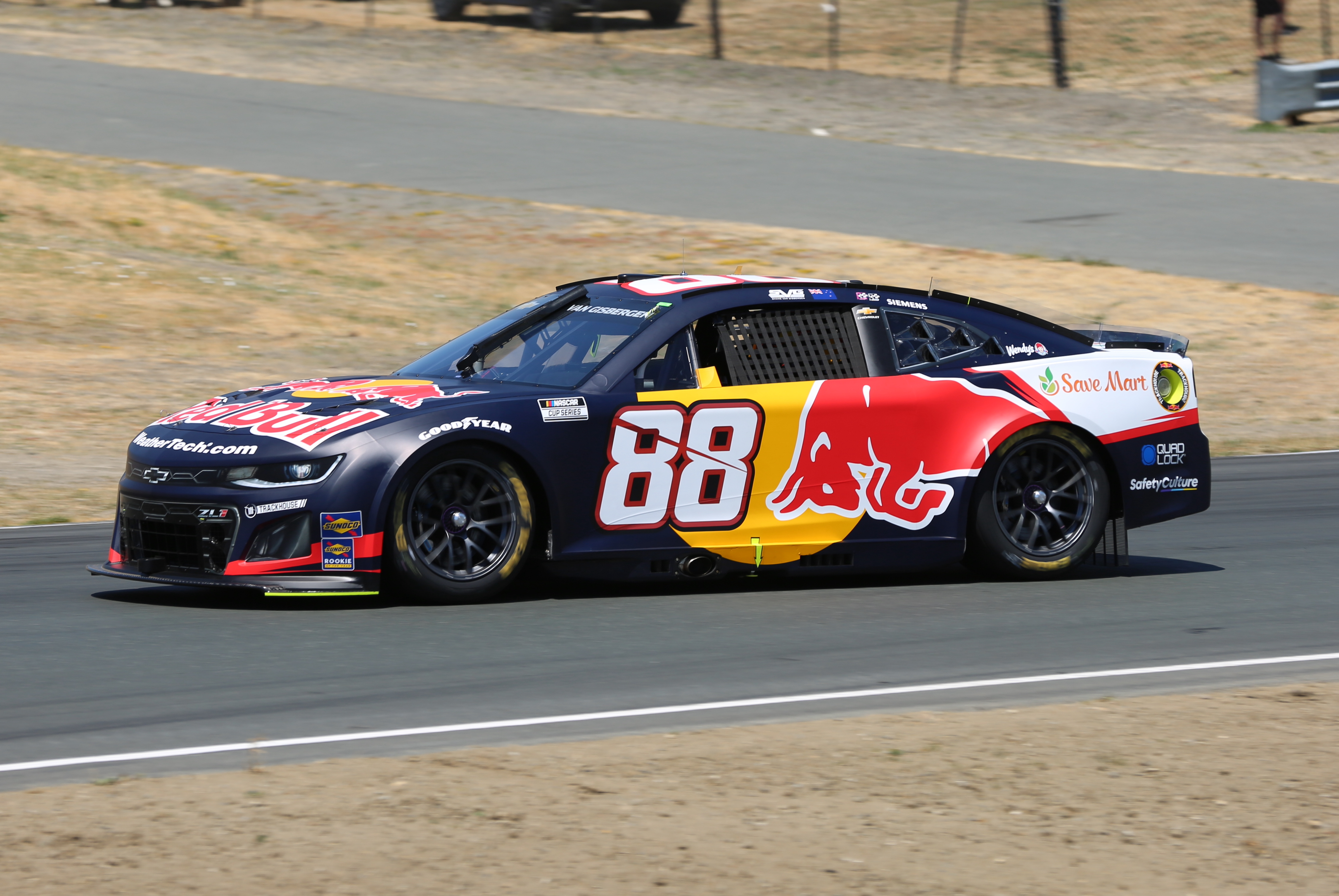
Shane Van Gisbergen's race-winning car at the 2025 Toyota/Save Mart 350

On August 24, 2024, Trackhouse announced that they had secured a third charter from Stewart–Haas Racing (which was shutting down following the 2024 season) and Shane van Gisbergen would be driving the No. 88 entry for 2025.

Van Gisbergen started the 2025 season with a 33rd place finish at the 2025 Daytona 500. He struggled throughout the regular season, scoring only one top-ten finish on the first fifteen races. Despite his setbacks, van Gisbergen scored a win and a playoff spot at Mexico. Three weeks later, he earned his second win of the season at the Chicago Street Course, followed by Sonoma a week later for his third. Despite being eliminated after the Round of 16, van Gisbergen scored his fifth consecutive road course win at the Charlotte Roval.

Connor Zilisch (2026–2027)

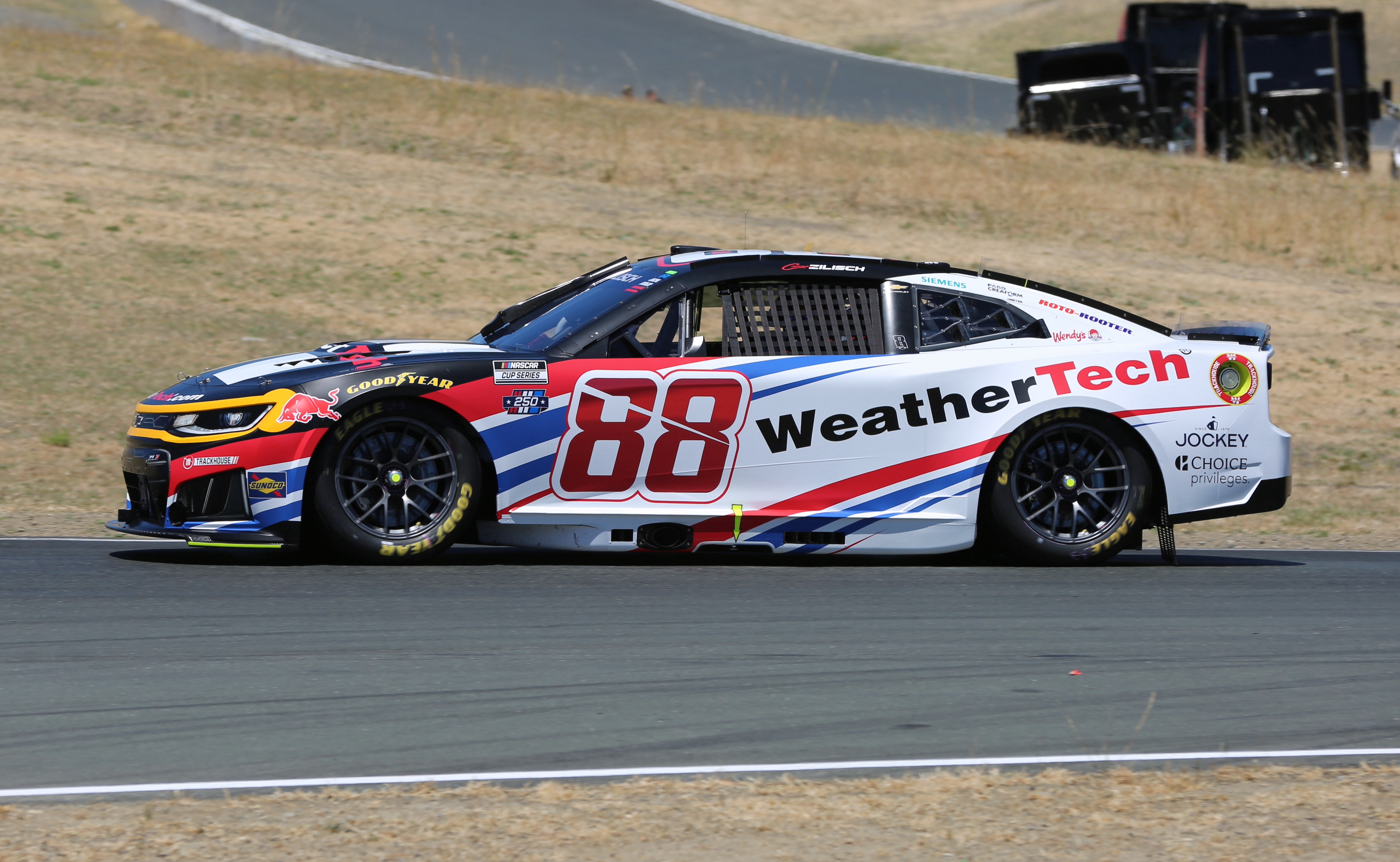
Connor Zilisch in the No. 88 at the 2026 Toyota/Save Mart 350

On November 7, 2025, Connor Zilisch was announced as the new driver of the No. 88 car after a dominant Xfinity Series run in 2025.

==== Car No. 88 results ====
Year	Driver	No.	Make	1	2	3	4	5	6	7	8	9	10	11	12	13	14	15	16	17	18	19	20	21	22	23	24	25	26	27	28	29	30	31	32	33	34	35	36	Owners	Pts
2025	Shane van Gisbergen	88	Chevy	DAY; 33	ATL; 23	COA; 6	PHO; 31	LVS; 34	HOM; 32	MAR; 34	DAR; 20	BRI; 38	TAL; 29	TEX; 22	KAN; 20	CLT; 14	NSH; 25	MCH; 18	MXC; 1*	POC; 31	ATL; 24	CSC; 1	SON; 1*	DOV; 30	IND; 19	IOW; 31	GLN; 1*	RCH; 14	DAY; 16	DAR; 32	GTW; 25	BRI; 26	NHA; 32	KAN; 10	ROV; 1*	LVS; 33	TAL; 11	MAR; 14	PHO; 24	12th	2211
2026	Connor Zilisch	88	Chevy	DAY; 33	ATL; 30	COA; 14	PHO; 29	LVS; 32	DAR; 18	MAR; 26	BRI; 33	KAN; 29	TAL; 26	TEX; 16	GLN; 20	CLT; 39	NSH; 38	MCH; 37	POC; 23	COR; 37	SON; 7	CHI; 38	ATL; 28	NWS; 32	IND; 34	IOW; 11	RCH; 25	NHA; 35	DAY; 25	DAR; 34	GTW; 7	BRI; 24	KAN; 29	LVS; 35	CLT; 21	PHO; 20	TAL; 29	MAR; 17	HOM; 19	34th	410
2027	Connor Zilisch	88	Chevy	DAY	ATL	COA	PHO	LVS	DAR	BRI	MAR	TAL	TEX	KAN	DOV	CLT	NSH	POC	MCH	CHI	IOW	SON	ATL	IND	COR	BRI	GTW	DAY	DAR	RCH	GLN	NHA	KAN	LVS	CLT	PHO	TAL	MAR	HOM	-	-

=== Car No. 91 history ===
Part-time with international drivers (2022–2023, 2025–present)

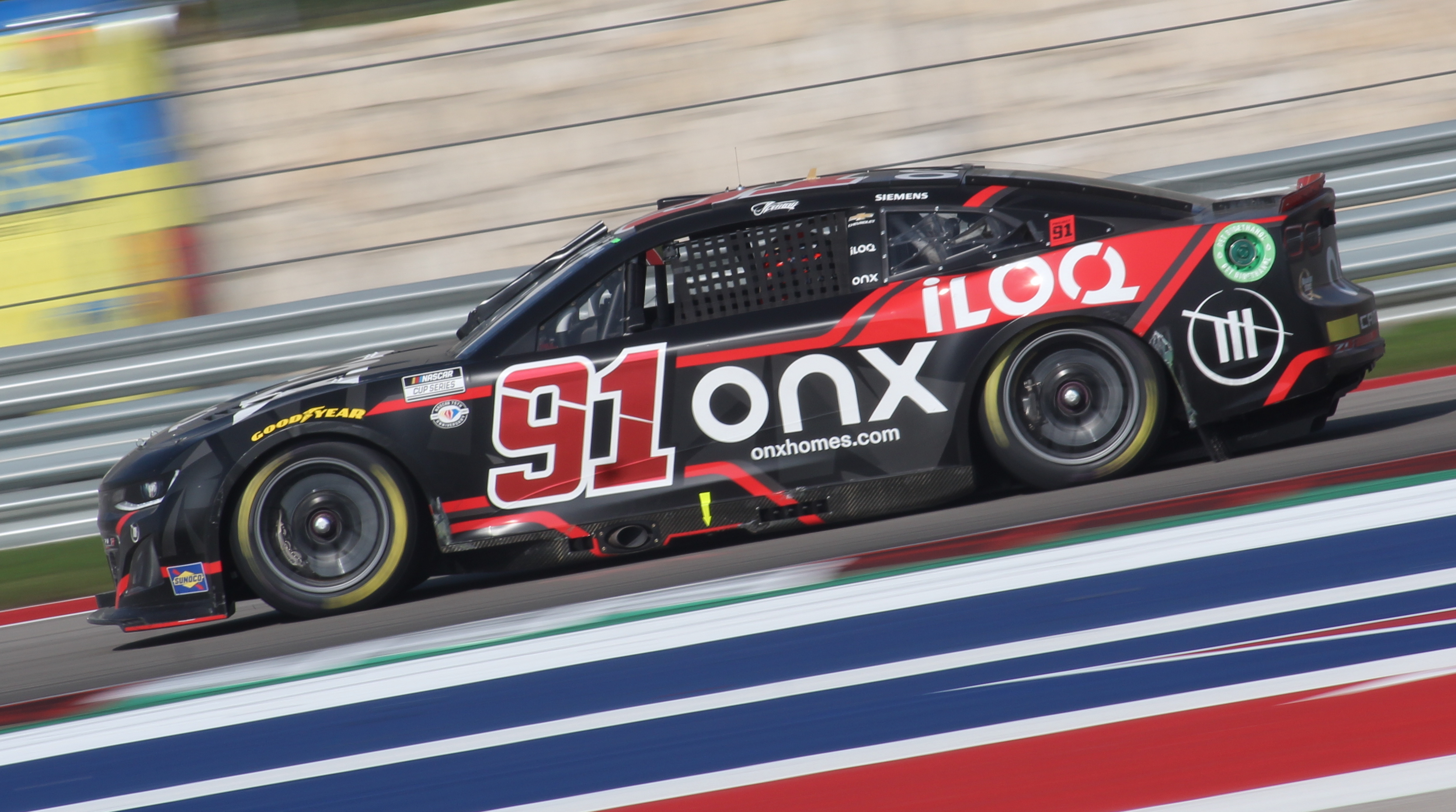
Kimi Räikkönen in the No. 91 at the Circuit of the Americas in 2023

On May 24, 2022, Trackhouse announced the creation of Project91, a part-time entry that aims to put international drivers behind the wheel in the Cup Series. The team was due to compete in at least one race during the 2022 season, with the driver and the race to be announced, before adding additional races in the 2023 season. Two days later, it was announced that 2007 Formula 1 World Champion Kimi Räikkönen would be driving the No. 91 car at Watkins Glen.

Räikkönen finished 37th after crashing on the tire barrier past the bus-stop chicane on lap 45. In 2023, Räikkönen returned to the No. 91 at COTA, where he finished 29th.

On May 18, 2023, the team announced New Zealander Shane van Gisbergen would make his NASCAR debut at the inaugural Grant Park 220 at the Chicago Street Course. After qualifying in third place, van Gisbergen won the race, becoming the first driver in the modern era of NASCAR, and the first driver in sixty years, to win his debut race. On July 19, 2023, Trackhouse Racing announced van Gisbergen would make his second start of the 2023 season at the Indianapolis Road Course.

On January 6, 2025, the team announced that Brazilian IndyCar driver Hélio Castroneves would drive the No. 91 and run the 2025 Daytona 500. Under NASCAR's new "Open Exemption Provisional" rule, Castroneves is guaranteed a starting position in the race.

On June 3, 2026, it was announced that former Formula 1 and current FIA World Endurance Championship (WEC) driver Kevin Magnussen would drive the No. 91 in the inaugural race at Naval Base Coronado in San Diego.

==== Car No. 91 results ====
Year	Driver	No.	Make	1	2	3	4	5	6	7	8	9	10	11	12	13	14	15	16	17	18	19	20	21	22	23	24	25	26	27	28	29	30	31	32	33	34	35	36	Owners	Pts
2022	Kimi Räikkönen	91	Chevy	DAY	CAL	LVS	PHO	ATL	COA	RCH	MAR	BRI	TAL	DOV	DAR	KAN	CLT	GTW	SON	NSH	ROA	ATL	NHA	POC	IND	MCH	RCH	GLN; 37	DAY	DAR	KAN	BRI	TEX	TAL	CLT	LVS	HOM	MAR	PHO	45th	1
2023	Kimi Räikkönen	91	Chevy	DAY	CAL	LVS	PHO	ATL	COA; 29	RCH	BRD	MAR	TAL	DOV	KAN	DAR	CLT	GTW	SON	NSH																				37th	92
2023	Shane van Gisbergen	91	Chevy																		CSC; 1	ATL	NHA	POC	RCH	MCH	IRC; 10	GLN	DAY	DAR	KAN	BRI	TEX	TAL	ROV	LVS	HOM	MAR	PHO	37th	92
2025	Hélio Castroneves	91	Chevy	DAY; 39	ATL	COA	PHO	LVS	HOM	MAR	DAR	BRI	TAL	TEX	KAN	CLT	NSH	MCH	MXC	POC	ATL	CSC	SON	DOV	IND	IOW	GLN	RCH	DAY	DAR	GTW	BRI	NHA	KAN	ROV	LVS	TAL	MAR	PHO		
2026	Kevin Magnussen	91	Chevy	DAY	ATL	COA	PHO	LVS	DAR	MAR	BRI	KAN	TAL	TEX	GLN	CLT	NSS	MCH	POC	COR; 27	SON	CHI	ATL	NWS	IND	IOW	RCH	NHA	DAY	DAR	GTW	BRI	KAN	LVS	CLT	PHO	TAL	MAR	HOM	42nd	11

=== Car No. 97 history ===
Shane van Gisbergen (2026)

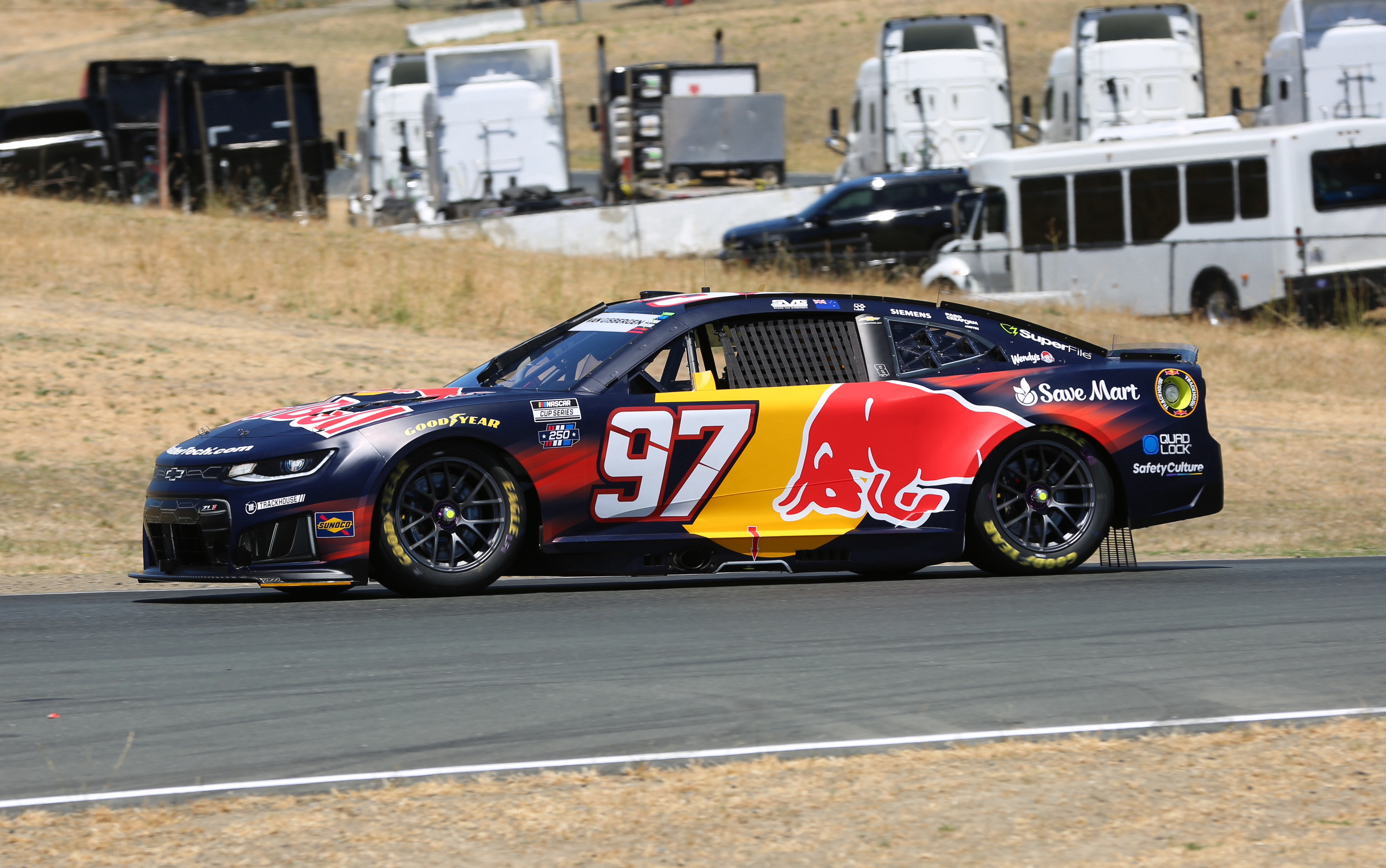
Shane Van Gisbergen's race-winning car at the 2026 Toyota/Save Mart 350

Shane van Gisbergen originally drove the No. 97 in his Supercars days (winning his three titles piloting the number for Triple Eight Race Engineering), as well as his Xfinity Series run with Kaulig Racing in 2024. He was later reunited with his number in 2026. Van Gisbergen started the season with a 30th place finish at the 2026 Daytona 500. During the season, he scored wins at Watkins Glen and Sonoma.

==== Car No. 97 results ====
Year	Driver	No.	Make	1	2	3	4	5	6	7	8	9	10	11	12	13	14	15	16	17	18	19	20	21	22	23	24	25	26	27	28	29	30	31	32	33	34	35	36	Owners	Pts
2026	Shane van Gisbergen	97	Chevy	DAY; 30	ATL; 6	COA; 2	PHO; 11	LVS; 36	DAR; 14	MAR; 11	BRI; 34	KAN; 36	TAL; 20	TEX; 17	GLN; 1*	CLT; 11	NSH; 5	MCH; 30	POC; 31	COR; 36	SON; 1*	CHI; 25	ATL; 6	NWS; 5	IND; 16	IOW; 30	RCH; 14	NHA; 20	DAY; 28	DAR; 26	GTW; 23	BRI; 20	KAN; 24	LVS; 9	CLT; 7	PHO; 26	TAL; 30	MAR; 5	HOM; 34	17th	774
2027	Shane van Gisbergen	97	Chevy	DAY	ATL	COA	PHO	LVS	DAR	BRI	MAR	TAL	TEX	KAN	DOV	CLT	NSH	POC	MCH	CHI	IOW	SON	ATL	IND	COR	BRI	GTW	DAY	DAR	RCH	GLN	NHA	KAN	LVS	CLT	PHO	TAL	MAR	HOM	-	-

=== Car No. 99 history ===
Daniel Suárez (2021–2025)

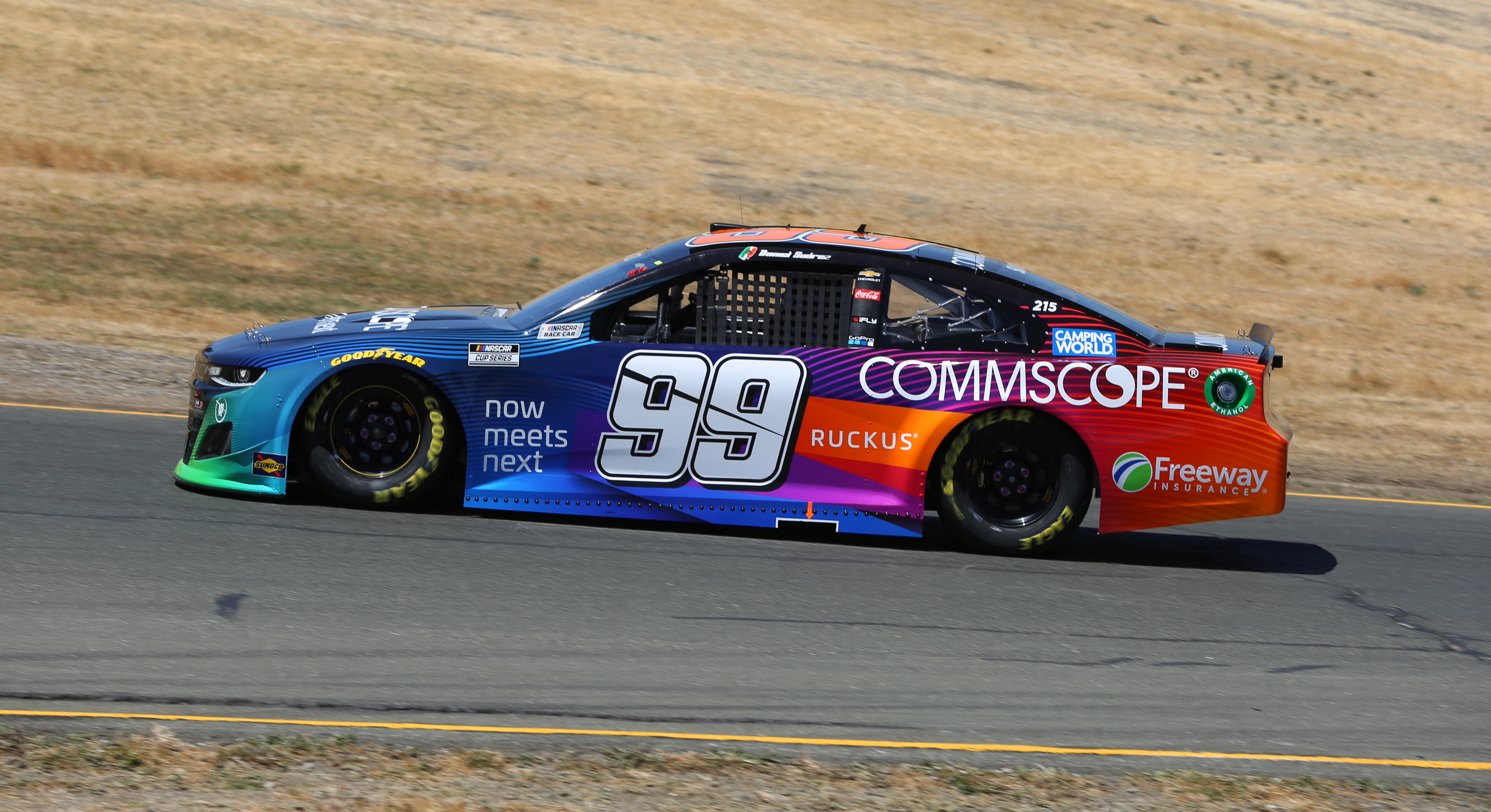
Daniel Suárez in the No. 99 car at Sonoma Raceway in 2021

On October 7, 2020, the team announced a full-time drive in 2021 with Daniel Suárez as driver. Later, the team announced that it leased a charter from Spire Motorsports to guarantee itself an entry into every 2021 race. Trackhouse aligned with Richard Childress Racing as an engine provider for 2021 as well as operating on RCR's campus in Welcome, North Carolina. Marks chose the 99 as the team number to pay tribute to Carl Edwards who had used the number for most of his cup series career as he mostly raced for Roush-Fenway Racing. On November 13, former JR Motorsports crew chief Travis Mack was announced as the No. 99's crew chief.

Suárez scored the team's first top-five with a fourth-place finish at the Bristol dirt race. With a total of four top-ten finishes, Suárez finished the 2021 season 25th in points. In February 2022, Trackhouse announced that Freeway Insurance would be a primary sponsor for Suárez and the No. 99 car for five events during the 2022 season. Suárez began the 2022 season with an 18th place finish at the 2022 Daytona 500. He followed it up with a fourth place finish at Fontana. In addition, Suárez finished ninth at Phoenix and fourth at Atlanta. On May 22, Suárez won the NASCAR Open for the second time in his career, which earned him a place in the All-Star Race where he finished fifth. At Sonoma, he became the first Mexican-born driver to win a Cup Series race. Suárez was eliminated in the Round of 12 after finishing 36th at the Charlotte Roval. Suárez would finish career-best tenth in the points standings.

Suárez started the 2023 season with a seventh-place finish at the 2023 Daytona 500. On March 29, he was fined US$50,000 for intentionally bumping Alex Bowman on pit road following the conclusion of the COTA race. With no wins, three top-fives, and ten top-ten finishes, Suárez missed the playoffs and finished nineteenth in the points standings.

Suárez started the 2024 season with a 34th place DNF at the 2024 Daytona 500. A week later, he beat Ryan Blaney and Kyle Busch in a three-wide photo finish at Atlanta to score his second career Cup Series win.

On July 1, 2025, it was announced that Suárez and Trackhouse mutually agreed to part ways after the 2025 season.

==== Car No. 99 results ====
Year	Driver	No.	Make	1	2	3	4	5	6	7	8	9	10	11	12	13	14	15	16	17	18	19	20	21	22	23	24	25	26	27	28	29	30	31	32	33	34	35	36	Owners	Pts
2021	Daniel Suárez	99	Chevy	DAY; 36	DAY; 16	HOM; 15	LVS; 26	PHO; 21	ATL; 17	BRI; 4	MAR; 32	RCH; 16	TAL; 23	KAN; 11	DAR; 23	DOV; 9	COA; 33	CLT; 15	SON; 12	NSH; 7	POC; 13	POC; 15	ROA; 36	ATL; 36	NHA; 20	GLN; 31	IRC; 37	MCH; 22	DAY; 19	DAR; 13	RCH; 17	BRI; 22	LVS; 15	TAL; 23	CLT; 13	TEX; 10	KAN; 15	MAR; 28	PHO; 21	25th	634
2022	Daniel Suárez	99	Chevy	DAY; 18	CAL; 4	LVS; 37	PHO; 9	ATL; 4	COA; 24	RCH; 16	MAR; 29	BRI; 12	TAL; 31	DOV; 14	DAR; 10	KAN; 33	CLT; 25	GTW; 23	SON; 1*	NSH; 15	ROA; 5	ATL; 6	NHA; 9	POC; 3	IRC; 28	MCH; 25	RCH; 19	GLN; 5	DAY; 24	DAR; 18	KAN; 10	BRI; 19	TEX; 12	TAL; 8	CLT; 36	LVS; 16	HOM; 10	MAR; 12	PHO; 24	10th	2272
2023	Daniel Suárez	99	Chevy	DAY; 7	CAL; 4	LVS; 10	PHO; 22	ATL; 29	COA; 27	RCH; 23	BRD; 25	MAR; 17	TAL; 9	DOV; 35	KAN; 15	DAR; 34	CLT; 23	GTW; 7	SON; 22	NSH; 12	CSC; 27	ATL; 2	NHA; 16	POC; 36	RCH; 33	MCH; 6	IRC; 3	GLN; 22	DAY; 20	DAR; 34	KAN; 16	BRI; 21	TEX; 8	TAL; 10	ROV; 33	LVS; 14	HOM; 16	MAR; 34	PHO; 11	19th	756
2024	Daniel Suárez	99	Chevy	DAY; 34	ATL; 1	LVS; 11	PHO; 13	BRI; 18	COA; 31	RCH; 22	MAR; 22	TEX; 5	TAL; 26	DOV; 18	KAN; 27	DAR; 24	CLT; 24	GTW; 23	SON; 14	IOW; 9	NHA; 21	NSH; 22	CSC; 11	POC; 16	IND; 8	RCH; 10	MCH; 8	DAY; 40	DAR; 18	ATL; 2	GLN; 13	BRI; 31	KAN; 13	TAL; 26	ROV; 30	LVS; 3	HOM; 16	MAR; 23	PHO; 10	12th	2226
2025	Daniel Suárez	99	Chevy	DAY; 13	ATL; 33	COA; 36	PHO; 23	LVS; 2	HOM; 22	MAR; 21	DAR; 15	BRI; 33	TAL; 9	TEX; 10	KAN; 34	CLT; 36	NSH; 16	MCH; 14	MXC; 19	POC; 15	ATL; 34	CSC; 29	SON; 14	DOV; 26	IND; 27	IOW; 25	GLN; 7	RCH; 7	DAY; 2	DAR; 25	GTW; 35	BRI; 37	NHA; 36	KAN; 17	ROV; 7	LVS; 20	TAL; 12	MAR; 22	PHO; 19	29th	611

=== Developmental program ===
In 2024, Trackhouse began signing developmental contracts with drivers.

Below is a list of current and former drivers signed to the team, but did not drive with Trackhouse.

==== Former ====
- Zane Smith – Signed in 2024 to a Cup Series contract and drove for Spire Motorsports. On August 23, of the same year, Smith and Trackhouse announced they would be parting ways at the end of the season.
- Shane van Gisbergen – Signed in 2024 to compete in the Cup Series and Xfinity Series with Kaulig Racing, ARCA Menards Series with Pinnacle Racing Group, and select late model races. He was promoted to a full-time Cup ride in 2025 and would be extended for 2026.
- Connor Zilisch – Signed on a multi-year deal to a contract in 2024 that would see him run races in the Xfinity Series with JR Motorsports, Craftsman Truck Series with Spire Motorsports, ARCA Menards Series, CARS Tour, Global MX-5 Cup with BSI Racing, and IMSA SportsCar Championship with Era Motorsport. He was promoted to a full-time Xfinity Series ride in 2025 with JR Motorsports. Trackhouse promoted Zilisch to a full-time Cup Series ride for 2026.

== MotoGP ==
SuperFile Trackhouse MotoGP Team
- Base: Nashville, Tennessee, U.S. Noale, Italy
- Principal: Team Principal: Davide Brivio; Team Manager: Francesco Guidotti
- Rider(s): MotoGP: 25. Raúl Fernández; 79. Ai Ogura
- Motorcycle: Aprilia RS-GP
- Tyres: Michelin

SuperFile Trackhouse MotoGP Team is a motorcycle racing team competing in the MotoGP class of Grand Prix motorcycle racing, under the management of Trackhouse Entertainment Group.

=== History ===
The former logo for Trackhouse MotoGP Team

Trackhouse Entertainment Group announced on December 5, 2023, that it would take over RNF Racing's entry spot in the MotoGP class of Grand Prix motorcycle racing, after RNF breached participation agreements.

The team competes as a satellite team of Aprilia.

Davide Brivio, one of the most successful MotoGP team managers with Yamaha and Suzuki, joined the project as team principal for its inaugural season.

On June 5, 2026, SuperFile was announced as the team's title sponsor for the rest of the MotoGP season.

=== MotoGP results ===
==== By rider ====
Year	Class	Team name	Bike	Riders	Races	Wins	Podiums	Poles	F. laps	Points	Pos.
2024	MotoGP	Trackhouse Racing	Aprilia RS-GP	(Spain) Raúl Fernández	20	0	0	0	0	66	16th
2024	MotoGP	Trackhouse Racing	Aprilia RS-GP	(Italy) Lorenzo Savadori	4	0	0	0	0	0	28th
2024	MotoGP	Trackhouse Racing	Aprilia RS-GP	(Portugal) Miguel Oliveira	15	0	0	0	0	75	15th
2025	MotoGP	Trackhouse MotoGP Team	Aprilia RS-GP	(Spain) Raúl Fernández	21	1	2	0	0	172	10th
2025	MotoGP	Trackhouse MotoGP Team	Aprilia RS-GP	(Japan) Ai Ogura	17	0	0	0	0	89	16th
2026	MotoGP	SuperFile Trackhouse MotoGP Team (Note: The team was called Trackhouse MotoGP Team until the Hungarian motorcycle Grand Prix as SuperFile became their title sponsor for the rest of the season. The team was called SuperFile Trackhouse MotoGP Team.)	Aprilia RS-GP	(Spain) Raúl Fernández	18	1	6	1	1	258*	7th*
2026	MotoGP	SuperFile Trackhouse MotoGP Team	Aprilia RS-GP	(Japan) Ai Ogura	17	1	4	1	2	294*	5th*
2026	MotoGP	SuperFile Trackhouse MotoGP Team	Aprilia RS-GP	(Italy) Lorenzo Savadori	1	0	0	0	0	0*	31st*

==== By year ====
(key) (Races in bold indicate pole position; races in italics indicate fastest lap)

Season	Team	Bike	Tyre	No.	Rider	Race																						RC	Pts	TC	Pts	MC	Pts
Season	Team	Bike	Tyre	No.	Rider	1	2	3	4	5	6	7	8	9	10	11	12	13	14	15	16	17	18	19	20	21	22	RC	Pts	TC	Pts	MC	Pts
2024	Trackhouse Racing	Aprilia RS-GP	M			QAT	POR	AME	SPA	FRA	CAT	ITA	NED	GER	GBR	AUT	ARA	RSM	EMI	INA	JPN	AUS	THA	MAL	SLD								
2024	Trackhouse Racing	Aprilia RS-GP	M	25	(Spain) Raúl Fernández	Ret	Ret	10	11	11^{9}	6	12	8	10	Ret	Ret	16	18	13	10	15	10^{6}	Ret	16	18			16th	66	9th	141	3rd	302
2024	Trackhouse Racing	Aprilia RS-GP	M	32	(Italy) Lorenzo Savadori																Ret	Ret	Ret	18				28th	0	9th	141	3rd	302
2024	Trackhouse Racing	Aprilia RS-GP	M	88	(Portugal) Miguel Oliveira	15	9	11	8^{8}	Ret	10	14	15	6^{2}	Ret	12	Ret^{5}	11	10	DNS					12			15th	75	9th	141	3rd	302
2025	Trackhouse MotoGP Team	Aprilia RS-GP	M			THA	ARG	AME	QAT	SPA	FRA	GBR	ARA	ITA	NED	GER	CZE	AUT	HUN	CAT	RSM	JPN	INA	AUS	MAL	POR	VAL						
2025	Trackhouse MotoGP Team	Aprilia RS-GP	M	25	(Spain) Raúl Fernández	Ret	15	12	17	15	7	12	10	7^{8}	8	9	5^{6}	9	Ret	11	11^{9}	7^{8}	6^{3}	1^{2}	Ret	WD	2^{4}	10th	172	7th	261	2nd	418
2025	Trackhouse MotoGP Team	Aprilia RS-GP	M	79	(Japan) Ai Ogura	5^{4}	DSQ	9^{9}	15^{7}	8	10	DNS		10	Ret	Ret	14	14	11	6^{9}	Ret	DNS^{9}		13	10	7	Ret^{9}	16th	89	7th	261	2nd	418
2026	SuperFile Trackhouse MotoGP Team	Aprilia RS-GP	M			THA	BRA	USA	SPA	FRA	CAT	ITA	HUN	CZE	NED	GER	GBR	ARA	RSM	AUT	JPN	INA	AUS	MAL	QAT	POR	VAL						
2026	SuperFile Trackhouse MotoGP Team	Aprilia RS-GP	M	25	(Spain) Raúl Fernández	3^{3}	10	8^{7}	6^{6}	8	17**^{4}**	8^{1}	Ret^{4}	7^{6}	2^{1}	3^{5}	1	Ret^{8}	6^{7}	12	5^{8}	**2**	C	DNS	3**^{4}**			7th*	258*	3rd*	552*	2nd*	561*
2026	SuperFile Trackhouse MotoGP Team	Aprilia RS-GP	M	79	(Japan) Ai Ogura	5^{4}	5^{5}	Ret^{6}	5	3^{7}	8**^{8}**	4**^{8}**	4	**2^{2}**	1^{2}	2^{4}	Ret^{2}			4**^{4}**	6**^{5}**	4**^{2}**	C	4**^{4}**	4**^{7}**			5th*	294*	3rd*	552*	2nd*	561*
2026	SuperFile Trackhouse MotoGP Team	Aprilia RS-GP	M	32	(Italy) Lorenzo Savadori													17										0*	31st*	3rd*	552*	2nd*	561*

* Season still in progress.

== IMSA ==
Trackhouse made their IMSA SportsCar Championship debut at the 2025 24 Hours of Daytona where they ran a Chevrolet Corvette Z06 GT3.R in the GTD Pro class with contracted developmental drivers Connor Zilisch and Shane van Gisbergen as well as former IMSA champion Ben Keating and IndyCar veteran Scott McLaughlin. The team finished ninth at their first race.

=== Complete IMSA SportsCar Championship results ===
(key) Races in bold indicates pole position. Races in italics indicates fastest lap.

Year	Entrant	Class	Drivers	No.	Rds.	Rounds											Pts.	Pos.
Year	Entrant	Class	Drivers	No.	Rds.	1	2	3	4	5	6	7	8	9	10	11	Pts.	Pos.
2025	(United States) Trackhouse by TF Sport	GTD Pro	(United States) Connor Zilisch (New Zealand) Shane van Gisbergen (New Zealand) Scott McLaughlin (United States) Ben Keating	91	1	DAY; 9	SEB	LBA	LGA	DET	WGL	MOS	ELK	VIR	IMS	ATL	243	14th
