= 2026 Bank of America 400 =

NASCAR Cup Series race

Race details
- Race 32 of 36 in the 2026 NASCAR Cup Series
- Date: October 11, 2026
- Location: Charlotte Motor Speedway, Concord, North Carolina
- Course: Permanent racing facility
- Course length: 1.5 miles (2.4 km)
- Distance: 267 laps, 400.5 mi (644.54 km)
- Average speed: 139.561 miles per hour (224.602 km/h)

Pole position
Driver	Kyle Larson	Hendrick Motorsports
- Grid positions set by competition-based formula

Most laps led
Driver	Kyle Larson	Hendrick Motorsports
- Laps: 97

Fastest lap
Driver	Gray Gaulding	MBM Motorsports
- Time: 29.369

Winner
No. 19	Chase Briscoe	Joe Gibbs Racing

Television in the United States
- Network: USA
- Announcers: Leigh Diffey, Jeff Burton and Steve Letarte

Radio in the United States
- Radio: PRN
- Booth announcers: Brad Gillie and Nick Yeoman
- Turn announcers: Andrew Kurland (1 & 2) and Pat Patterson (3 & 4)

The 2026 Bank of America 400 was a NASCAR Cup Series race held on October 11, 2026, at Charlotte Motor Speedway in Charlotte, North Carolina on the 1.5-mile (2.4 km) asphalt oval, it was the 32nd race of the 2026 NASCAR Cup Series season, and the sixth race of the NASCAR Chase.

Chase Briscoe won the race in a photo finish, his second straight win. Christopher Bell finished 2nd, and Ryan Blaney finished 3rd. Denny Hamlin and Kyle Larson rounded out the top five, and Josh Berry, Tyler Reddick, Shane van Gisbergen, Joey Logano, and Chris Buescher rounded out the top ten.

== Report ==
=== Background ===
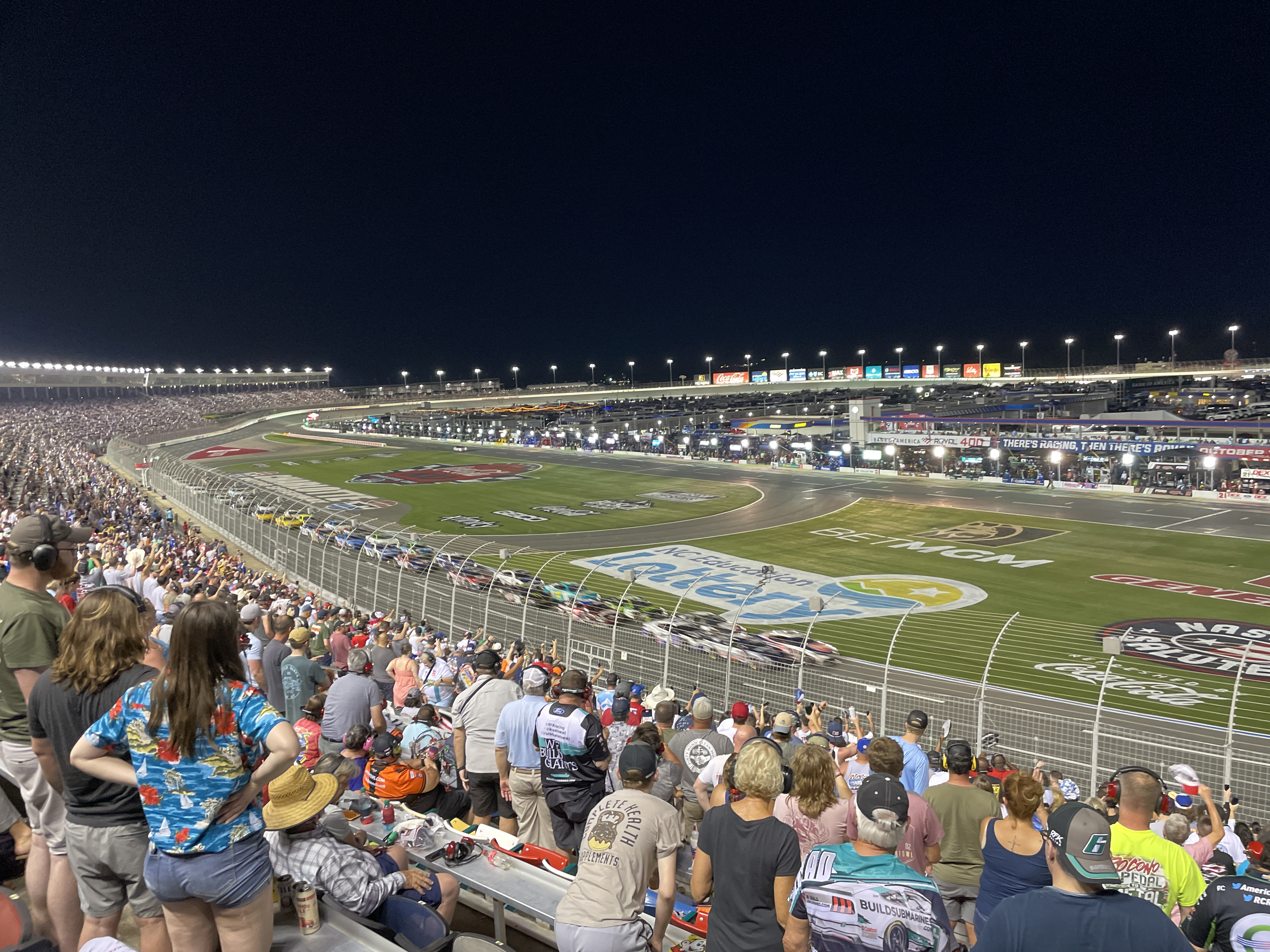
Charlotte Motor Speedway, the track where the race will be held.

The race will be held at Charlotte Motor Speedway, located in Concord, North Carolina. The speedway complex includes a 1.5-mile (2.4 km) quad-oval track that was utilized for the race, as well as a dragstrip and a dirt track. The speedway was built in 1959 by Bruton Smith and is considered the home track for NASCAR with many race teams based in the Charlotte metropolitan area. The track is owned and operated by Speedway Motorsports Inc. (SMI) with Marcus G. Smith serving as track president.

The fall Charlotte race was originally announced to be held on the Roval configuration, but news broke that in February that it would move to the oval track.

==== Entry list ====
- (R) denotes rookie driver.
- (i) denotes driver who is ineligible for series driver points.
- (CC) denotes chase contender.

No.	Driver	Team	Manufacturer
1	Ross Chastain	Trackhouse Racing	Chevrolet
2	Austin Cindric (CC)	Team Penske	Ford
3	Austin Dillon	Richard Childress Racing	Chevrolet
4	Noah Gragson	Front Row Motorsports	Ford
5	Kyle Larson (CC)	Hendrick Motorsports	Chevrolet
6	Brad Keselowski	RFK Racing	Ford
7	Daniel Suárez (CC)	Spire Motorsports	Chevrolet
9	Chase Elliott (CC)	Hendrick Motorsports	Chevrolet
10	Ty Dillon	Kaulig Racing	Chevrolet
11	Denny Hamlin (CC)	Joe Gibbs Racing	Toyota
12	Ryan Blaney (CC)	Team Penske	Ford
16	A. J. Allmendinger	Kaulig Racing	Chevrolet
17	Chris Buescher (CC)	RFK Racing	Ford
19	Chase Briscoe (CC)	Joe Gibbs Racing	Toyota
20	Christopher Bell (CC)	Joe Gibbs Racing	Toyota
21	Josh Berry	Wood Brothers Racing	Ford
22	Joey Logano (CC)	Team Penske	Ford
23	Bubba Wallace (CC)	23XI Racing	Toyota
24	William Byron (CC)	Hendrick Motorsports	Chevrolet
33	Austin Hill (i)	Richard Childress Racing	Chevrolet
34	Todd Gilliland	Front Row Motorsports	Ford
35	Riley Herbst	23XI Racing	Toyota
38	Zane Smith	Front Row Motorsports	Ford
41	Cole Custer	Haas Factory Team	Ford
42	John Hunter Nemechek	Legacy Motor Club	Toyota
43	Erik Jones	Legacy Motor Club	Toyota
44	B. J. McLeod	NY Racing Team	Chevrolet
45	Tyler Reddick (CC)	23XI Racing	Toyota
47	Ricky Stenhouse Jr.	Hyak Motorsports	Chevrolet
48	Alex Bowman	Hendrick Motorsports	Chevrolet
51	Cody Ware	Rick Ware Racing	Chevrolet
54	Ty Gibbs (CC)	Joe Gibbs Racing	Toyota
60	Ryan Preece (CC)	RFK Racing	Ford
66	Gray Gaulding (i)	Garage 66	Ford
67	Corey Heim (i)	23XI Racing	Toyota
71	Michael McDowell	Spire Motorsports	Chevrolet
77	Carson Hocevar (CC)	Spire Motorsports	Chevrolet
88	Connor Zilisch (R)	Trackhouse Racing	Chevrolet
97	Shane van Gisbergen	Trackhouse Racing	Chevrolet
Official entry list

== Qualifying ==
Practice and qualifying for the race was canceled due to inclement weather. Kyle Larson was awarded the pole for the race as a result of NASCAR's pandemic formula with a score of 1.700.

=== Starting lineup ===
Pos	No.	Driver	Team	Manufacturer
1	5	Kyle Larson (CC)	Hendrick Motorsports	Chevrolet
2	19	Chase Briscoe (CC)	Joe Gibbs Racing	Toyota
3	45	Tyler Reddick (CC)	23XI Racing	Toyota
4	12	Ryan Blaney (CC)	Team Penske	Ford
5	2	Austin Cindric (CC)	Team Penske	Ford
6	24	William Byron (CC)	Hendrick Motorsports	Chevrolet
7	22	Joey Logano (CC)	Team Penske	Ford
8	23	Bubba Wallace (CC)	23XI Racing	Toyota
9	9	Chase Elliott (CC)	Hendrick Motorsports	Chevrolet
10	97	Shane van Gisbergen	Trackhouse Racing	Chevrolet
11	77	Carson Hocevar (CC)	Spire Motorsports	Chevrolet
12	11	Denny Hamlin (CC)	Joe Gibbs Racing	Toyota
13	17	Chris Buescher (CC)	RFK Racing	Ford
14	54	Ty Gibbs (CC)	Joe Gibbs Racing	Toyota
15	7	Daniel Suárez (CC)	Spire Motorsports	Chevrolet
16	48	Alex Bowman	Hendrick Motorsports	Chevrolet
17	20	Christopher Bell (CC)	Joe Gibbs Racing	Toyota
18	16	A. J. Allmendinger	Kaulig Racing	Chevrolet
19	71	Michael McDowell	Spire Motorsports	Chevrolet
20	3	Austin Dillon	Richard Childress Racing	Chevrolet
21	35	Riley Herbst	23XI Racing	Toyota
22	6	Brad Keselowski	RFK Racing	Ford
23	4	Noah Gragson	Front Row Motorsports	Ford
24	60	Ryan Preece (CC)	RFK Racing	Ford
25	43	Erik Jones	Legacy Motor Club	Toyota
26	33	Austin Hill (i)	Richard Childress Racing	Chevrolet
27	21	Josh Berry	Wood Brothers Racing	Ford
28	1	Ross Chastain	Trackhouse Racing	Chevrolet
29	42	John Hunter Nemechek	Legacy Motor Club	Toyota
30	41	Cole Custer	Haas Factory Team	Ford
31	34	Todd Gilliland	Front Row Motorsports	Ford
32	47	Ricky Stenhouse Jr.	Hyak Motorsports	Chevrolet
33	10	Ty Dillon	Kaulig Racing	Chevrolet
34	38	Zane Smith	Front Row Motorsports	Ford
35	51	Cody Ware	Rick Ware Racing	Chevrolet
36	88	Connor Zilisch (R)	Trackhouse Racing	Chevrolet
37	67	Corey Heim (i)	23XI Racing	Toyota
38	66	Gray Gaulding (i)	Garage 66	Ford
39	44	B. J. McLeod	NY Racing Team	Chevrolet
Official starting lineup

== Race ==
=== Race results ===
==== Stage results ====
Stage One Laps: 77

Pos	No	Driver	Team	Manufacturer	Points
1	5	Kyle Larson (CC)	Hendrick Motorsports	Chevrolet	10
2	19	Chase Briscoe (CC)	Joe Gibbs Racing	Toyota	9
3	20	Christopher Bell (CC)	Joe Gibbs Racing	Toyota	8
4	2	Austin Cindric (CC)	Team Penske	Ford	7
5	45	Tyler Reddick (CC)	23XI Racing	Toyota	6
6	7	Daniel Suárez (CC)	Spire Motorsports	Chevrolet	5
7	67	Corey Heim (i)	23XI Racing	Toyota	0
8	77	Carson Hocevar (CC)	Spire Motorsports	Chevrolet	3
9	17	Chris Buescher (CC)	RFK Racing	Ford	2
10	12	Ryan Blaney (CC)	Team Penske	Ford	1

Stage Two Laps: 88

Pos	No	Driver	Team	Manufacturer	Points
1	20	Christopher Bell (CC)	Joe Gibbs Racing	Toyota	10
2	12	Ryan Blaney (CC)	Team Penske	Ford	9
3	11	Denny Hamlin (CC)	Joe Gibbs Racing	Toyota	8
4	5	Kyle Larson (CC)	Hendrick Motorsports	Chevrolet	7
5	45	Tyler Reddick (CC)	23XI Racing	Toyota	6
6	2	Austin Cindric (CC)	Team Penske	Ford	5
7	19	Chase Briscoe (CC)	Joe Gibbs Racing	Toyota	4
8	21	Josh Berry	Wood Brothers Racing	Ford	3
9	9	Chase Elliott (CC)	Hendrick Motorsports	Chevrolet	2
10	77	Carson Hocevar (CC)	Spire Motorsports	Chevrolet	1

=== Final Stage results ===
Stage Three Laps: 102

Pos	Grid	No	Driver	Team	Manufacturer	Laps	Points
1	2	19	Chase Briscoe (CC)	Joe Gibbs Racing	Toyota	267	68
2	17	20	Christopher Bell (CC)	Joe Gibbs Racing	Toyota	267	53
3	4	12	Ryan Blaney (CC)	Team Penske	Ford	267	44
4	27	21	Josh Berry	Wood Brothers Racing	Ford	267	36
5	12	11	Denny Hamlin (CC)	Joe Gibbs Racing	Toyota	267	40
6	1	5	Kyle Larson (CC)	Hendrick Motorsports	Chevrolet	267	49
7	10	97	Shane van Gisbergen	Trackhouse Racing	Chevrolet	267	30
8	3	45	Tyler Reddick (CC)	23XI Racing	Toyota	267	41
9	7	22	Joey Logano (CC)	Team Penske	Ford	267	28
10	13	17	Chris Buescher (CC)	RFK Racing	Ford	267	29
11	37	67	Corey Heim (i)	23XI Racing	Toyota	267	0
12	9	9	Chase Elliott (CC)	Hendrick Motorsports	Chevrolet	267	27
13	15	7	Daniel Suárez (CC)	Spire Motorsports	Chevrolet	267	29
14	11	77	Carson Hocevar (CC)	Spire Motorsports	Chevrolet	267	27
15	24	60	Ryan Preece (CC)	RFK Racing	Ford	267	22
16	28	1	Ross Chastain	Trackhouse Racing	Chevrolet	267	21
17	5	2	Austin Cindric (CC)	Team Penske	Ford	267	32
18	21	35	Riley Herbst	23XI Racing	Toyota	267	19
19	19	71	Michael McDowell	Spire Motorsports	Chevrolet	267	18
20	34	38	Zane Smith	Front Row Motorsports	Ford	267	17
21	36	88	Connor Zilisch (R)	Trackhouse Racing	Chevrolet	267	16
22	31	34	Todd Gilliland	Front Row Motorsports	Ford	267	15
23	32	47	Ricky Stenhouse Jr.	Hyak Motorsports	Chevrolet	267	14
24	25	43	Erik Jones	Legacy Motor Club	Toyota	267	13
25	23	4	Noah Gragson	Front Row Motorsports	Ford	267	12
26	20	3	Austin Dillon	Richard Childress Racing	Chevrolet	267	11
27	30	41	Cole Custer	Haas Factory Team	Chevrolet	267	10
28	18	16	A. J. Allmendinger	Kaulig Racing	Chevrolet	266	9
29	22	6	Brad Keselowski	RFK Racing	Ford	266	8
30	33	10	Ty Dillon	Kaulig Racing	Chevrolet	266	7
31	35	51	Cody Ware	Rick Ware Racing	Chevrolet	266	6
32	26	33	Austin Hill (i)	Richard Childress Racing	Chevrolet	265	0
33	39	44	B. J. McLeod	NY Racing Team	Chevrolet	264	4
34	14	54	Ty Gibbs (CC)	Joe Gibbs Racing	Toyota	259	3
35	29	42	John Hunter Nemechek	Legacy Motor Club	Toyota	259	2
36	38	66	Gray Gaulding (i)	Garage 66	Ford	201	0
37	8	23	Bubba Wallace (CC)	23XI Racing	Toyota	76	1
38	16	48	Alex Bowman	Hendrick Motorsports	Chevrolet	76	1
39	6	24	William Byron (CC)	Hendrick Motorsports	Chevrolet	76	1
Official race results

=== Race statistics ===
- Lead changes: 11 among 5 different drivers
- Cautions/Laps: 6 for 33
- Red flags: 0
- Time of race: 2 hours, 52 minutes, and 11 seconds
- Average speed: 139.561 miles per hour (224.602 km/h)

== Media ==
=== Television ===
USA Sports covered the race on the television side. Leigh Diffey, Jeff Burton and Steve Letarte called the race from the broadcast booth. Dave Burns, Kim Coon, and Marty Snider handled pit road, while Trevor Bayne provided analysis from the pace car for the television side.

USA
Booth announcers	Pit reporters	Pace car
Lap-by-lap: Leigh Diffey; Color-commentator: Jeff Burton; Color-commentator: Steve Letarte	Dave Burns; Kim Coon; Marty Snider	Trevor Bayne

=== Radio ===
PRN had the radio call for the race, which was also simulcast on Sirius XM NASCAR Radio. Brad Gillie and Nick Yeoman called the race in the booth when the field races through the quad-oval. Andrew Kurland called the race from a billboard in turn 2 when the field raced through turns 1 and 2 and halfway down the backstretch. Doug Turnbull called the race from a billboard outside of turn 3 when the field raced through the other half of the backstretch and through turns 3 and 4. Wendy Venturini, Brett McMillan, and Alan Cavanna were the pit reporters during the broadcast.

PRN
Booth announcers	Turn announcers	Pit reporters
Lead announcer: Brad Gillie; Announcer: Nick Yeoman	Turns 1 & 2: Andrew Kurland; Turns 3 & 4: Doug Turnbull	Wendy Venturini; Brett McMillan; Alan Cavanna

== Standings after the race ==
Drivers' Championship standings

	Pos	Driver	Points
	1	Kyle Larson	2,367
	2	Denny Hamlin	2,318 (–49)
	3	Christopher Bell	2,316 (–51)
2	4	Chase Briscoe	2,302 (–65)
	5	Ryan Blaney	2,282 (–85)
2	6	Joey Logano	2,275 (–92)
	7	Tyler Reddick	2,253 (–114)
1	8	Austin Cindric	2,222 (–145)
1	9	Ty Gibbs	2,211 (–156)
1	10	Carson Hocevar	2,187 (–180)
1	11	Bubba Wallace	2,182 (–185)
1	12	Chase Elliott	2,182 (–185)
1	13	William Byron	2,159 (–208)
	14	Daniel Suárez	2,152 (–215)
	15	Chris Buescher	2,151 (–216)
	16	Ryan Preece	2,140 (–227)
Official driver's standings

Manufacturers' Championship standings

Pos	Manufacturer	Points
1	Toyota	1,434
2	Chevrolet	1,238 (–196)
3	Ford	1,189 (–245)

- Note: Only the first 16 positions are included for the driver standings.

Previous race: 2026 South Point 400	NASCAR Cup Series; 2026 season	Next race: 2026 Freeway Insurance 500
