= 2026 Dollar Tree 301 =

NASCAR stock car race held in Loudon, New Hampshire, U.S.

Race details
- Race 25 of 36 in the 2026 NASCAR Cup Series
- Date: August 23, 2026
- Location: New Hampshire Motor Speedway in Loudon, New Hampshire
- Course: Permanent racing facility
- Course length: 1.058 miles (1.703 km)
- Distance: 301 laps, 318.458 mi (512.508 km)
- Average speed: 94.133 miles per hour (151.492 km/h)

Pole position
Driver	Tyler Reddick	23XI Racing
- Time: 29.054

Most laps led
Driver	Ryan Blaney	Team Penske
- Laps: 115

Fastest lap
Driver	Carson Hocevar	Spire Motorsports
- Time: 29.812

Winner
No. 12	Ryan Blaney	Team Penske

Television in the United States
- Network: USA
- Announcers: Leigh Diffey, Jeff Burton, and Steve Letarte

Radio in the United States
- Radio: PRN
- Booth announcers: Brad Gillie and Nick Yeoman
- Turn announcers: Kyle Rickey (1 & 2) and Pat Patterson (3 & 4)

The 2026 Dollar Tree 301 was a NASCAR Cup Series race that was held on August 23, 2026, at New Hampshire Motor Speedway in Loudon, New Hampshire. Contested over 301 laps on the 1.058-mile (1.703 km) oval, it was the 25th race of the 2026 NASCAR Cup Series season.

Ryan Blaney won the race. Bubba Wallace finished 2nd, and Josh Berry finished 3rd. Christopher Bell and Kyle Larson rounded out the top five, and Ty Gibbs, Denny Hamlin, Tyler Reddick, Ryan Preece, and Noah Gragson rounded out the top ten.

Following this race, Denny Hamlin clinched the regular season championship.

== Report ==
=== Background ===
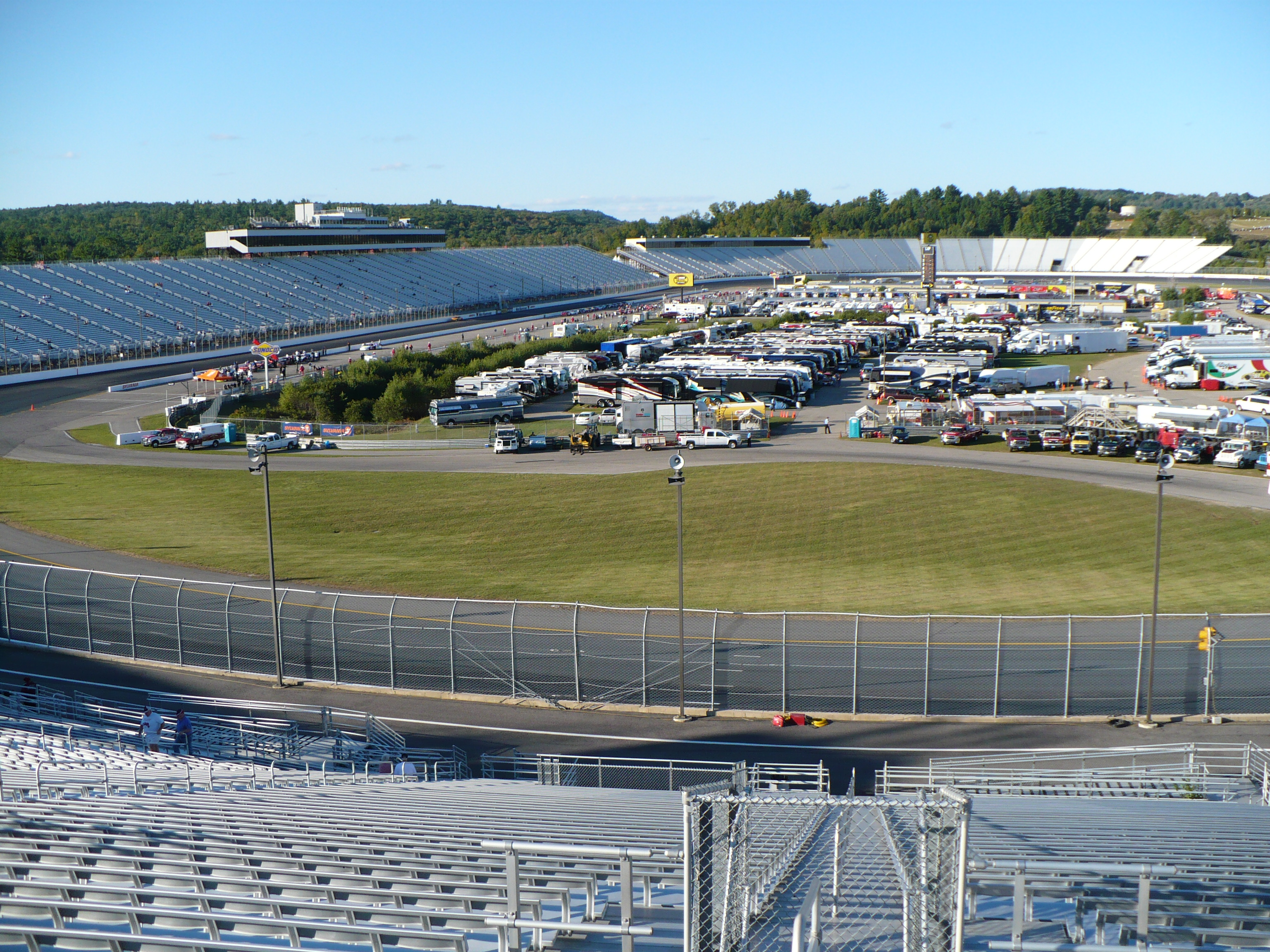
New Hampshire Motor Speedway, the track where the race was held.

New Hampshire Motor Speedway is a 1.058-mile (1.703 km) oval speedway located in Loudon, New Hampshire, which has hosted NASCAR racing annually since the early 1990s, as well as the longest-running motorcycle race in North America, the Loudon Classic. Nicknamed "The Magic Mile", the speedway is often converted into a 1.6-mile (2.6 km) road course, which includes much of the oval.

The track was originally the site of Bryar Motorsports Park before being purchased and redeveloped by Bob Bahre. The track is currently one of eight major NASCAR tracks owned and operated by Speedway Motorsports.

On May 3, 2026, Dollar Tree was announced as the title sponsor of the race, replacing Mobil 1.

On July 22, it was announced that Cup Series practice will be consolidated into a single 50-minute session starting at New Hampshire.

==== Entry list ====
- (R) denotes rookie driver.
- (i) denotes driver who is ineligible for series driver points.

No.	Driver	Team	Manufacturer
1	Ross Chastain	Trackhouse Racing	Chevrolet
2	Austin Cindric	Team Penske	Ford
3	Austin Dillon	Richard Childress Racing	Chevrolet
4	Noah Gragson	Front Row Motorsports	Ford
5	Kyle Larson	Hendrick Motorsports	Chevrolet
6	Brad Keselowski	RFK Racing	Ford
7	Daniel Suárez	Spire Motorsports	Chevrolet
9	Chase Elliott	Hendrick Motorsports	Chevrolet
10	Ty Dillon	Kaulig Racing	Chevrolet
11	Denny Hamlin	Joe Gibbs Racing	Toyota
12	Ryan Blaney	Team Penske	Ford
16	A. J. Allmendinger	Kaulig Racing	Chevrolet
17	Chris Buescher	RFK Racing	Ford
19	Chase Briscoe	Joe Gibbs Racing	Toyota
20	Christopher Bell	Joe Gibbs Racing	Toyota
21	Josh Berry	Wood Brothers Racing	Ford
22	Joey Logano	Team Penske	Ford
23	Bubba Wallace	23XI Racing	Toyota
24	William Byron	Hendrick Motorsports	Chevrolet
33	Austin Hill (i)	Richard Childress Racing	Chevrolet
34	Todd Gilliland	Front Row Motorsports	Ford
35	Riley Herbst	23XI Racing	Toyota
38	Zane Smith	Front Row Motorsports	Ford
40	John Hunter Nemechek	Legacy Motor Club	Toyota
41	Cole Custer	Haas Factory Team	Ford
43	Erik Jones	Legacy Motor Club	Toyota
45	Tyler Reddick	23XI Racing	Toyota
47	Ricky Stenhouse Jr.	Hyak Motorsports	Chevrolet
48	Alex Bowman	Hendrick Motorsports	Chevrolet
51	Cody Ware	Rick Ware Racing	Ford
54	Ty Gibbs	Joe Gibbs Racing	Toyota
60	Ryan Preece	RFK Racing	Ford
71	Michael McDowell	Spire Motorsports	Chevrolet
77	Carson Hocevar	Spire Motorsports	Chevrolet
88	Connor Zilisch (R)	Trackhouse Racing	Chevrolet
97	Shane van Gisbergen	Trackhouse Racing	Chevrolet
Official entry list

== Practice ==
Erik Jones was the fastest in the practice session with a time of 29.242 seconds and a speed of 130.251 mph (209.619 km/h).

=== Practice results ===
Pos	No.	Driver	Team	Manufacturer	Time	Speed
1	43	Erik Jones	Legacy Motor Club	Toyota	29.242	130.251
2	54	Ty Gibbs	Joe Gibbs Racing	Toyota	29.263	130.158
3	23	Bubba Wallace	23XI Racing	Toyota	29.277	130.095
Official practice results

== Qualifying ==
Tyler Reddick scored the pole for the race with a time of 29.054 and a speed of 131.094 mph (210.975 km/h).

=== Qualifying results ===
Pos	No.	Driver	Team	Manufacturer	Time	Speed
1	45	Tyler Reddick	23XI Racing	Toyota	29.054	131.094
2	21	Josh Berry	Wood Brothers Racing	Ford	29.069	131.026
3	24	William Byron	Hendrick Motorsports	Chevrolet	29.079	130.981
4	11	Denny Hamlin	Joe Gibbs Racing	Toyota	29.081	130.972
5	97	Shane van Gisbergen	Trackhouse Racing	Chevrolet	29.106	130.860
6	20	Christopher Bell	Joe Gibbs Racing	Toyota	29.174	130.555
7	54	Ty Gibbs	Joe Gibbs Racing	Toyota	29.187	130.496
8	12	Ryan Blaney	Team Penske	Ford	29.198	130.447
9	5	Kyle Larson	Hendrick Motorsports	Chevrolet	29.199	130.443
10	48	Alex Bowman	Hendrick Motorsports	Chevrolet	29.204	130.420
11	43	Erik Jones	Legacy Motor Club	Toyota	29.219	130.354
12	1	Ross Chastain	Trackhouse Racing	Chevrolet	29.229	130.309
13	34	Todd Gilliland	Front Row Motorsports	Ford	29.236	130.278
14	38	Zane Smith	Front Row Motorsports	Ford	29.236	130.278
15	71	Michael McDowell	Spire Motorsports	Chevrolet	29.257	130.184
16	17	Chris Buescher	RFK Racing	Ford	29.269	130.131
17	19	Chase Briscoe	Joe Gibbs Racing	Toyota	29.270	130.126
18	60	Ryan Preece	RFK Racing	Ford	29.275	130.104
19	4	Noah Gragson	Front Row Motorsports	Ford	29.296	130.011
20	88	Connor Zilisch (R)	Trackhouse Racing	Chevrolet	29.300	129.993
21	22	Joey Logano	Team Penske	Ford	29.310	129.949
22	77	Carson Hocevar	Spire Motorsports	Chevrolet	29.327	129.873
23	23	Bubba Wallace	23XI Racing	Toyota	29.334	129.843
24	16	A. J. Allmendinger	Kaulig Racing	Chevrolet	29.346	129.789
25	6	Brad Keselowski	RFK Racing	Ford	29.370	129.683
26	2	Austin Cindric	Team Penske	Ford	29.375	129.661
27	35	Riley Herbst	23XI Racing	Toyota	29.378	129.648
28	33	Austin Hill (i)	Richard Childress Racing	Chevrolet	29.442	129.366
29	9	Chase Elliott	Hendrick Motorsports	Chevrolet	29.540	128.937
30	47	Ricky Stenhouse Jr.	Hyak Motorsports	Chevrolet	29.556	128.867
31	42	John Hunter Nemechek	Legacy Motor Club	Toyota	29.620	128.589
32	41	Cole Custer	Haas Factory Team	Chevrolet	29.687	128.299
33	10	Ty Dillon	Kaulig Racing	Chevrolet	29.693	128.273
34	3	Austin Dillon	Richard Childress Racing	Chevrolet	29.702	128.234
35	7	Daniel Suárez	Spire Motorsports	Chevrolet	29.816	127.743
36	51	Cody Ware	Rick Ware Racing	Chevrolet	29.822	127.718
Official qualifying results

== Race ==
=== Race results ===
==== Stage Results ====
Stage One Laps: 70

Pos	No	Driver	Team	Manufacturer	Points
1	5	Kyle Larson	Hendrick Motorsports	Chevrolet	10
2	20	Christopher Bell	Joe Gibbs Racing	Toyota	9
3	77	Carson Hocevar	Spire Motorsports	Chevrolet	8
4	24	William Byron	Hendrick Motorsports	Chevrolet	7
5	21	Josh Berry	Wood Brothers Racing	Ford	6
6	12	Ryan Blaney	Team Penske	Ford	5
7	54	Ty Gibbs	Joe Gibbs Racing	Toyota	4
8	60	Ryan Preece	RFK Racing	Ford	3
9	97	Shane van Gisbergen	Trackhouse Racing	Chevrolet	2
10	19	Chase Briscoe	Joe Gibbs Racing	Toyota	1

Stage Two Laps: 115

Pos	No	Driver	Team	Manufacturer	Points
1	12	Ryan Blaney	Team Penske	Ford	10
2	21	Josh Berry	Wood Brothers Racing	Ford	9
3	23	Bubba Wallace	23XI Racing	Toyota	8
4	60	Ryan Preece	RFK Racing	Ford	7
5	5	Kyle Larson	Hendrick Motorsports	Chevrolet	6
6	6	Brad Keselowski	RFK Racing	Ford	5
7	17	Chris Buescher	RFK Racing	Ford	4
8	54	Ty Gibbs	Joe Gibbs Racing	Toyota	3
9	11	Denny Hamlin	Joe Gibbs Racing	Toyota	2
10	20	Christopher Bell	Joe Gibbs Racing	Toyota	1

=== Final Stage Results ===
Stage Three Laps: 116

Pos	Grid	No	Driver	Team	Manufacturer	Laps	Points
1	8	12	Ryan Blaney	Team Penske	Ford	301	70
2	23	23	Bubba Wallace	23XI Racing	Toyota	301	43
3	2	21	Josh Berry	Wood Brothers Racing	Ford	301	49
4	6	20	Christopher Bell	Joe Gibbs Racing	Toyota	301	43
5	9	5	Kyle Larson	Hendrick Motorsports	Chevrolet	301	48
6	7	54	Ty Gibbs	Joe Gibbs Racing	Toyota	301	38
7	4	11	Denny Hamlin	Joe Gibbs Racing	Toyota	301	32
8	1	45	Tyler Reddick	23XI Racing	Toyota	301	29
9	18	60	Ryan Preece	RFK Racing	Ford	301	38
10	19	4	Noah Gragson	Front Row Motorsports	Ford	301	27
11	25	6	Brad Keselowski	RFK Racing	Ford	301	31
12	26	2	Austin Cindric	Team Penske	Ford	301	25
13	14	38	Zane Smith	Front Row Motorsports	Ford	301	24
14	21	22	Joey Logano	Team Penske	Ford	301	23
15	10	48	Alex Bowman	Hendrick Motorsports	Chevrolet	301	22
16	15	71	Michael McDowell	Spire Motorsports	Chevrolet	301	21
17	35	7	Daniel Suárez	Spire Motorsports	Chevrolet	301	20
18	16	17	Chris Buescher	RFK Racing	Ford	301	23
19	22	77	Carson Hocevar	Spire Motorsports	Chevrolet	300	27
20	5	97	Shane van Gisbergen	Trackhouse Racing	Chevrolet	300	19
21	13	34	Todd Gilliland	Front Row Motorsports	Ford	300	16
22	32	41	Cole Custer	Haas Factory Team	Chevrolet	300	15
23	24	16	A. J. Allmendinger	Kaulig Racing	Chevrolet	300	14
24	28	33	Austin Hill (i)	Richard Childress Racing	Chevrolet	300	0
25	29	9	Chase Elliott	Hendrick Motorsports	Chevrolet	300	12
26	17	19	Chase Briscoe	Joe Gibbs Racing	Toyota	300	12
27	33	10	Ty Dillon	Kaulig Racing	Chevrolet	300	10
28	30	47	Ricky Stenhouse Jr.	Hyak Motorsports	Chevrolet	300	9
29	36	51	Cody Ware	Rick Ware Racing	Chevrolet	300	8
30	3	24	William Byron	Hendrick Motorsports	Chevrolet	296	14
31	31	42	John Hunter Nemechek	Legacy Motor Club	Toyota	296	6
32	34	3	Austin Dillon	Richard Childress Racing	Chevrolet	282	5
33	11	43	Erik Jones	Legacy Motor Club	Toyota	251	4
34	27	35	Riley Herbst	23XI Racing	Toyota	222	3
35	20	88	Connor Zilisch (R)	Trackhouse Racing	Chevrolet	222	2
36	12	1	Ross Chastain	Trackhouse Racing	Chevrolet	41	1
Official race results

=== Race statistics ===
- Lead changes: 15 among 7 different drivers
- Cautions/Laps: 9 for 51
- Red flags: 0
- Time of race: 3 hours, 22 minutes and 59 seconds
- Average speed: 94.133 miles per hour (151.492 km/h)

== Media ==
=== Television ===
USA covered the race on the television side. Leigh Diffey, four-time and all-time Loudon winner Jeff Burton and Steve Letarte called the race from the broadcast booth. Dave Burns, Kim Coon, and Marty Snider handled pit road, while Trevor Bayne provided analysis from the pace car for the television side.

USA
Booth announcers	Pit reporters	Pace car
Lap-by-lap: Leigh Diffey; Color-commentator: Jeff Burton; Color-commentator: Steve Letarte	Dave Burns; Kim Coon; Marty Snider	Trevor Bayne

=== Radio ===
The race was broadcast on radio by the Performance Racing Network and simulcast on Sirius XM NASCAR Radio. Brad Gillie and Nick Yeoman called the race from the booth when the field races down the front stretch. MRN's Kyle Rickey called the race from atop a billboard outside of turn 2 when the field races through turns 1 and 2, and Pat Patterson called the race from a billboard outside of turn 3 when the field races through turns 3 and 4. On pit road, PRN was manned by Brett McMillan, Andrew Kurland and Heather DeBeaux.

PRN
Booth announcers	Turn announcers	Pit reporters
Lead announcer: Brad Gillie; Announcer: Nick Yeoman	Turns 1 & 2: Kyle Rickey; Turns 3 & 4: Pat Patterson	Brett McMillan; Andrew Kurland; Heather DeBeaux

== Standings after the race ==
Drivers' Championship standings

	Pos	Driver	Points
	1	Denny Hamlin	1,001
	2	Ryan Blaney	924 (–77)
	3	Ty Gibbs	880 (–121)
	4	Tyler Reddick	860 (–141)
2	5	Christopher Bell	738 (–263)
1	6	Chase Briscoe	727 (–274)
1	7	Kyle Larson	708 (–293)
2	8	Chase Elliott	707 (–294)
	9	Joey Logano	682 (–319)
	10	Chris Buescher	676 (–325)
	11	Carson Hocevar	672 (–329)
	12	William Byron	644 (–357)
	13	Daniel Suárez	638 (–363)
	14	Bubba Wallace	630 (–371)
	15	Austin Cindric	599 (–402)
	16	Shane van Gisbergen	586 (–415)
Official driver's standings

Manufacturers' Championship standings

Pos	Manufacturer	Points
1	Toyota	1,142
2	Chevrolet	960 (–182)
3	Ford	910 (–232)

- Note: Only the first 16 positions are included for the driver standings.
- . – Driver has clinched a position in the Cup Series Chase.

Previous race: 2026 Cook Out 400 (Richmond)	NASCAR Cup Series; 2026 season	Next race: 2026 Coke Zero Sugar 400
