= 2022 AdventHealth 400 =

NASCAR Cup Series race

Race details
- Race 13 of 36 in the 2022 NASCAR Cup Series
- The 2022 AdventHealth 400 program cover.
- Date: May 15, 2022
- Location: Kansas Speedway in Kansas City, Kansas, U.S.
- Course: Permanent racing facility
- Course length: 1.5 miles (2.4 km)
- Distance: 267 laps, 400.5 mi (644.542 km)
- Average speed: 124.476 miles per hour (200.325 km/h)

Pole position
Driver	Christopher Bell	Joe Gibbs Racing
- Time: 30.071

Most laps led
Driver	Kurt Busch	23XI Racing
- Laps: 116

Winner
No. 45	Kurt Busch	23XI Racing

Television in the United States
- Network: FS1
- Announcers: Mike Joy, Clint Bowyer, and Jamie McMurray
- Nielsen ratings: 1.43; 2,337,000 viewers

Radio in the United States
- Radio: MRN
- Booth announcers: Alex Hayden, Jeff Striegle, and Todd Gordon
- Turn announcers: Dave Moody (1 & 2) and Kurt Becker (3 & 4)

The 2022 AdventHealth 400 was a NASCAR Cup Series race that was held on May 15, 2022, at Kansas Speedway in Kansas City, Kansas. Contested over 267 laps on the 1.5-mile (2.4 km) asphalt speedway, it was the 13th race of the 2022 NASCAR Cup Series season. It was also the 34th and final win of Kurt Busch’s career, who would be forced to retire following a crash at Pocono in the same year.

== Report ==
The layout of Kansas Speedway, the venue where the race was held.

=== Background ===
Kansas Speedway is a 1.5-mile (2.4 km) tri-oval race track in Kansas City, Kansas. It was built in 2001 and hosts two annual NASCAR race weekends. The NTT IndyCar Series also raced there until 2011. The speedway is owned and operated by the International Speedway Corporation.

==== Entry list ====
- (R) denotes rookie driver.
- (i) denotes driver who is ineligible for series driver points.

No.	Driver	Team	Manufacturer
1	Ross Chastain	Trackhouse Racing Team	Chevrolet
2	Austin Cindric (R)	Team Penske	Ford
3	Austin Dillon	Richard Childress Racing	Chevrolet
4	Kevin Harvick	Stewart-Haas Racing	Ford
5	Kyle Larson	Hendrick Motorsports	Chevrolet
6	Brad Keselowski	RFK Racing	Ford
7	Corey LaJoie	Spire Motorsports	Chevrolet
8	Tyler Reddick	Richard Childress Racing	Chevrolet
9	Chase Elliott	Hendrick Motorsports	Chevrolet
10	Aric Almirola	Stewart-Haas Racing	Ford
11	Denny Hamlin	Joe Gibbs Racing	Toyota
12	Ryan Blaney	Team Penske	Ford
14	Chase Briscoe	Stewart-Haas Racing	Ford
15	J. J. Yeley (i)	Rick Ware Racing	Ford
16	Noah Gragson (i)	Kaulig Racing	Chevrolet
17	Chris Buescher	RFK Racing	Ford
18	Kyle Busch	Joe Gibbs Racing	Toyota
19	Martin Truex Jr.	Joe Gibbs Racing	Toyota
20	Christopher Bell	Joe Gibbs Racing	Toyota
21	Harrison Burton (R)	Wood Brothers Racing	Ford
22	Joey Logano	Team Penske	Ford
23	Bubba Wallace	23XI Racing	Toyota
24	William Byron	Hendrick Motorsports	Chevrolet
31	Justin Haley	Kaulig Racing	Chevrolet
34	Michael McDowell	Front Row Motorsports	Ford
38	Todd Gilliland (R)	Front Row Motorsports	Ford
41	Cole Custer	Stewart-Haas Racing	Ford
42	Ty Dillon	Petty GMS Motorsports	Chevrolet
43	Erik Jones	Petty GMS Motorsports	Chevrolet
45	Kurt Busch	23XI Racing	Toyota
47	Ricky Stenhouse Jr.	JTG Daugherty Racing	Chevrolet
48	Alex Bowman	Hendrick Motorsports	Chevrolet
51	Cody Ware	Rick Ware Racing	Ford
77	Josh Bilicki (i)	Spire Motorsports	Chevrolet
78	B. J. McLeod	Live Fast Motorsports	Ford
99	Daniel Suárez	Trackhouse Racing Team	Chevrolet
Official entry list

== Practice ==
Kurt Busch was the fastest in the practice session with a time of 30.758 seconds and a speed of 175.564 mph (282.543 km/h).

=== Practice results ===
Pos	No.	Driver	Team	Manufacturer	Time	Speed
1	45	Kurt Busch	23XI Racing	Toyota	30.758	175.564
2	18	Kyle Busch	Joe Gibbs Racing	Toyota	30.784	175.416
3	8	Tyler Reddick	Richard Childress Racing	Chevrolet	30.845	175.069
Official practice results

== Qualifying ==
Christopher Bell scored the pole for the race with a time of 30.071 seconds and a speed of 179.575 mph (288.998 km/h).

=== Qualifying results ===
Pos	No.	Driver	Team	Manufacturer	R1	R2
1	20	Christopher Bell	Joe Gibbs Racing	Toyota	30.073	30.071
2	8	Tyler Reddick	Richard Childress Racing	Chevrolet	30.388	30.192
3	5	Kyle Larson	Hendrick Motorsports	Chevrolet	30.515	30.206
4	2	Austin Cindric (R)	Team Penske	Ford	30.507	30.261
5	45	Kurt Busch	23XI Racing	Toyota	30.356	30.276
6	18	Kyle Busch	Joe Gibbs Racing	Toyota	30.496	30.340
7	10	Aric Almirola	Stewart-Haas Racing	Ford	30.456	30.355
8	48	Alex Bowman	Hendrick Motorsports	Chevrolet	30.340	30.411
9	19	Martin Truex Jr.	Joe Gibbs Racing	Toyota	30.463	30.606
10	12	Ryan Blaney	Team Penske	Ford	30.554	30.618
11	1	Ross Chastain	Trackhouse Racing Team	Chevrolet	30.513	—
12	14	Chase Briscoe	Stewart-Haas Racing	Ford	30.530	—
13	24	William Byron	Hendrick Motorsports	Chevrolet	30.553	—
14	9	Chase Elliott	Hendrick Motorsports	Chevrolet	30.570	—
15	31	Justin Haley	Kaulig Racing	Chevrolet	30.617	—
16	41	Cole Custer	Stewart-Haas Racing	Ford	30.676	—
17	42	Ty Dillon	Petty GMS Motorsports	Chevrolet	30.692	—
18	11	Denny Hamlin	Joe Gibbs Racing	Toyota	30.701	—
19	99	Daniel Suárez	Trackhouse Racing Team	Chevrolet	30.706	—
20	7	Corey LaJoie	Spire Motorsports	Chevrolet	30.743	—
21	3	Austin Dillon	Richard Childress Racing	Chevrolet	30.749	—
22	43	Erik Jones	Petty GMS Motorsports	Chevrolet	30.759	—
23	4	Kevin Harvick	Stewart-Haas Racing	Ford	30.762	—
24	23	Bubba Wallace	23XI Racing	Toyota	30.822	—
25	34	Michael McDowell	Front Row Motorsports	Ford	30.885	—
26	21	Harrison Burton (R)	Wood Brothers Racing	Ford	30.970	—
27	15	J. J. Yeley (i)	Rick Ware Racing	Ford	31.013	—
28	16	Noah Gragson (i)	Kaulig Racing	Chevrolet	31.457	—
29	51	Cody Ware	Rick Ware Racing	Ford	31.467	—
30	6	Brad Keselowski	RFK Racing	Ford	31.644	—
31	38	Todd Gilliland (R)	Front Row Motorsports	Ford	31.701	—
32	77	Josh Bilicki (i)	Spire Motorsports	Chevrolet	32.106	—
33	78	B. J. McLeod	Live Fast Motorsports	Ford	32.096	—
34	22	Joey Logano	Team Penske	Ford	0.000	—
35	17	Chris Buescher	RFK Racing	Ford	0.000	—
36	47	Ricky Stenhouse Jr.	JTG Daugherty Racing	Chevrolet	0.000	—
Official qualifying results

== Race ==
=== Stage Results ===
Stage One Laps: 80

Pos	No	Driver	Team	Manufacturer	Points
1	45	Kurt Busch	23XL racing	Toyota	10
2	1	Ross Chastain	Trackhouse Racing Team	Chevrolet	9
3	9	Chase Elliott	Hendrick Motorsports	Chevrolet	8
4	8	Tyler Reddick	Richard Childress Racing	Chevrolet	7
5	24	William Byron	Hendrick Motorsports	Chevrolet	6
6	19	Martin Truex Jr.	Joe Gibbs Racing	Toyota	5
7	23	Bubba Wallace	23XI Racing	Toyota	4
8	43	Erik Jones	Petty GMS Motorsports	Chevrolet	3
9	12	Ryan Blaney	Team Penske	Ford	2
10	48	Alex Bowman	Hendrick Motorsports	Chevrolet	1
Official stage one results

Stage Two Laps: 85

Pos	No	Driver	Team	Manufacturer	Points
1	45	Kurt Busch	23XI Racing	Toyota	10
2	18	Kyle Busch	Joe Gibbs Racing	Toyota	9
3	12	Ryan Blaney	Team Penske	Ford	8
4	2	Austin Cindric (R)	Team Penske	Ford	7
5	9	Chase Elliott	Hendrick Motorsports	Chevrolet	6
6	5	Kyle Larson	Hendrick Motorsports	Chevrolet	5
7	1	Ross Chastain	Trackhouse Racing Team	Chevrolet	4
8	11	Denny Hamlin	Joe Gibbs Racing	Toyota	3
9	22	Joey Logano	Team Penske	Ford	2
10	23	Bubba Wallace	23XI Racing	Toyota	1
Official stage two results

=== Final Stage Results ===
Stage Three Laps: 102

Pos	Grid	No	Driver	Team	Manufacturer	Laps	Points
1	5	45	Kurt Busch	23XI Racing	Toyota	267	50
2	3	5	Kyle Larson	Hendrick Motorsports	Chevrolet	267	40
3	6	18	Kyle Busch	Joe Gibbs Racing	Toyota	267	53
4	18	11	Denny Hamlin	Joe Gibbs Racing	Toyota	267	36
5	1	20	Christopher Bell	Joe Gibbs Racing	Toyota	267	32
6	9	19	Martin Truex Jr.	Joe Gibbs Racing	Toyota	267	36
7	11	1	Ross Chastain	Trackhouse Racing Team	Chevrolet	267	43
8	36	47	Ricky Stenhouse Jr.	JTG Daugherty Racing	Chevrolet	267	29
9	8	48	Alex Bowman	Hendrick Motorsports	Chevrolet	267	29
10	24	23	Bubba Wallace	23XI Racing	Toyota	267	32
11	4	2	Austin Cindric (R)	Team Penske	Ford	267	33
12	10	12	Ryan Blaney	Team Penske	Ford	267	35
13	21	3	Austin Dillon	Richard Childress Racing	Chevrolet	267	24
14	30	6	Brad Keselowski	RFK Racing	Ford	267	23
15	23	4	Kevin Harvick	Stewart-Haas Racing	Ford	267	22
16	13	24	William Byron	Hendrick Motorsports	Chevrolet	267	27
17	34	22	Joey Logano	Team Penske	Ford	267	22
18	28	16	Noah Gragson (i)	Kaulig Racing	Chevrolet	267	0
19	20	7	Corey LaJoie	Spire Motorsports	Chevrolet	267	18
20	17	42	Ty Dillon	Petty GMS Motorsports	Chevrolet	267	17
21	26	21	Harrison Burton (R)	Wood Brothers Racing	Ford	267	16
22	16	41	Cole Custer	Stewart-Haas Racing	Ford	267	15
23	25	34	Michael McDowell	Front Row Motorsports	Ford	267	14
24	12	14	Chase Briscoe	Stewart-Haas Racing	Ford	266	13
25	31	38	Todd Gilliland (R)	Front Row Motorsports	Ford	266	12
26	7	10	Aric Almirola	Stewart-Haas Racing	Ford	266	11
27	35	17	Chris Buescher	RFK Racing	Ford	265	10
28	32	77	Josh Bilicki (i)	Spire Motorsports	Chevrolet	265	0
29	14	9	Chase Elliott	Hendrick Motorsports	Chevrolet	264	22
30	2	8	Tyler Reddick	Richard Childress Racing	Chevrolet	263	14
31	27	15	J. J. Yeley (i)	Rick Ware Racing	Ford	263	0
32	22	43	Erik Jones	Petty GMS Motorsports	Chevrolet	261	8
33	19	99	Daniel Suárez	Trackhouse Racing Team	Chevrolet	256	4
34	29	51	Cody Ware	Rick Ware Racing	Ford	255	3
35	15	31	Justin Haley	Kaulig Racing	Chevrolet	64	2
36	33	78	B. J. McLeod	Live Fast Motorsports	Ford	32	1
Official race results

=== Race statistics ===
- Lead changes: 18 among 10 different drivers
- Cautions/Laps: 8 for 47
- Red flags: 0
- Time of race: 3 hours, 13 minutes and 3 seconds
- Average speed: 124.476 miles per hour (200.325 km/h)

== Media ==
=== Television ===
Fox Sports covered their 11th race at the Kansas Speedway. Mike Joy, Clint Bowyer and Jamie McMurray called the race from the broadcast booth. Jamie Little and Vince Welch handled pit road for the television side. Larry McReynolds provided insight from the Fox Sports studio in Charlotte.

FS1
Booth announcers	Pit reporters	In-race analyst
Lap-by-lap: Mike Joy; Color-commentator: Clint Bowyer; Color-commentator: Jamie McMurray	Jamie Little; Vince Welch	Larry McReynolds

=== Radio ===
MRN had the radio call for the race which was also simulcast on Sirius XM NASCAR Radio. Alex Hayden, Jeff Striegle and former crew chief Todd Gordon called the race in the booth when the field raced through the tri-oval. Dave Moody covered the race from the Sunoco spotters stand outside turn 2 when the field was racing through turns 1 and 2. Kurt Becker called the race from a platform outside turn 4. Steve Post, Brienne Pedigo and Jason Toy worked pit road for the radio side.

MRN Radio
Booth announcers	Turn announcers	Pit reporters
Lead announcer: Alex Hayden; Announcer: Jeff Striegle; Announcer: Todd Gordon	Turns 1 & 2: Dave Moody; Turns 3 & 4: Kurt Becker	Steve Post; Brienne Pedigo; Jason Toy

== Standings after the race ==
Drivers' Championship standings

	Pos	Driver	Points
	1	Chase Elliott	475
1	2	Ryan Blaney	423 (–52)
3	3	Kyle Busch	417 (–58)
2	4	William Byron	415 (–60)
	5	Ross Chastain	407 (–68)
1	6	Martin Truex Jr.	400 (–75)
3	7	Joey Logano	396 (–79)
	8	Alex Bowman	386 (–89)
	9	Kyle Larson	376 (–99)
	10	Christopher Bell	359 (–116)
	11	Kevin Harvick	335 (–140)
	12	Aric Almirola	322 (–153)
1	13	Austin Dillon	311 (–164)
1	14	Chase Briscoe	300 (–175)
	15	Tyler Reddick	300 (–175)
2	16	Austin Cindric	291 (–184)
Official driver's standings

Manufacturers' Championship standings

	Pos	Manufacturer	Points
	1	Chevrolet	481
1	2	Toyota	445 (–36)
1	3	Ford	432 (–49)

- Note: Only the first 16 positions are included for the driver standings.
- . – Driver has clinched a position in the NASCAR Cup Series playoffs.

Previous race: 2022 Goodyear 400	NASCAR Cup Series; 2022 season	Next race: 2022 Coca-Cola 600
