= 2023 Würth 400 =

NASCAR Cup Series race

Race details
- Race 11 of 36 in the 2023 NASCAR Cup Series
- Date: May 1, 2023
- Location: Dover Motor Speedway in Dover, Delaware
- Course: Permanent racing facility
- Course length: 1 miles (1.6 km)
- Distance: 400 laps, 400 mi (640 km)
- Average speed: 115.505 miles per hour (185.887 km/h)

Pole position
Driver	Kyle Busch	Richard Childress Racing
- Time: 3.500 (Pandemic Formula)

Most laps led
Driver	William Byron	Hendrick Motorsports
- Laps: 193

Winner
No. 19	Martin Truex Jr.	Joe Gibbs Racing

Television in the United States
- Network: FS1
- Announcers: Mike Joy, Clint Bowyer, and Rusty Wallace

Radio in the United States
- Radio: PRN
- Booth announcers: Doug Rice and Mark Garrow
- Turn announcers: Pat Patterson (Backstretch)

The 2023 Würth 400 was a NASCAR Cup Series race held on May 1, 2023, at Dover Motor Speedway in Dover, Delaware. Contested over 400 laps on the 1-mile (1.6 km) concrete speedway, it was the 11th race of the 2023 NASCAR Cup Series season. The race was postponed from Sunday, April 30 to Monday, May 1, due to rain. This is the first Dover race broadcast on Performance Racing Network on radio after Speedway Motorsports purchased the track before the 2022 season but still aired on rival International Speedway Corporation's Motor Racing Network.

== Report ==
=== Background ===
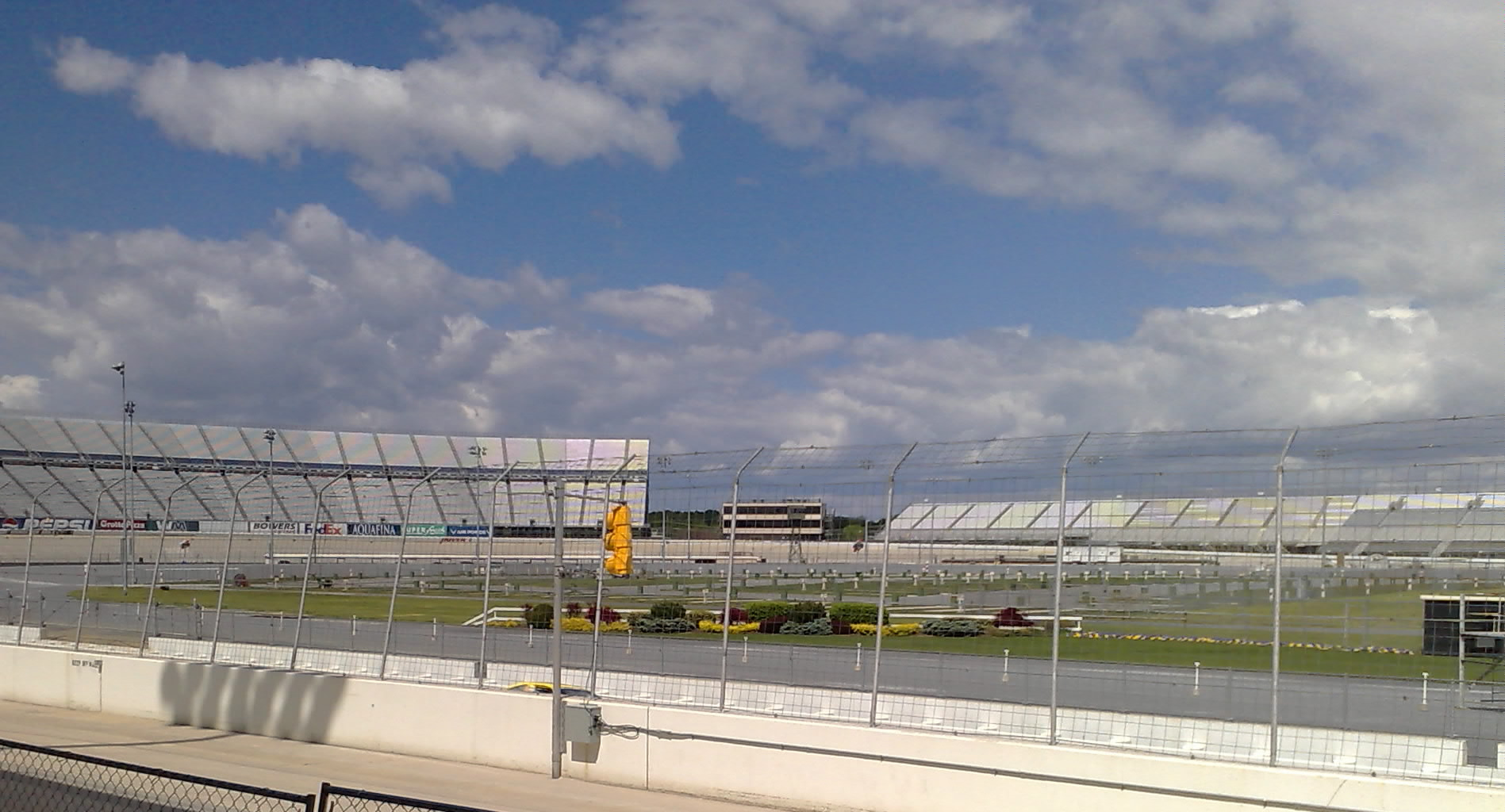
Dover Motor Speedway, the track where the race was held.

Dover Motor Speedway is an oval race track in Dover, Delaware, United States that held at least one NASCAR race each year since 1969, including two per year from 1971 to 2020. In addition to NASCAR, the track also hosted USAC and the NTT IndyCar Series. The track features one layout, a 1 mile (1.6 km) concrete oval, with 24° banking in the turns and 9° banking on the straights. The speedway is owned and operated by Speedway Motorsports.

The track, nicknamed "The Monster Mile", was built in 1969 by Melvin Joseph of Melvin L. Joseph Construction Company, Inc., with an asphalt surface, but was replaced with concrete in 1995. Six years later in 2001, the track's capacity moved to 135,000 seats, making the track have the largest capacity of sports venue in the mid-Atlantic. In 2002, the name changed to Dover International Speedway from Dover Downs International Speedway after Dover Downs Gaming and Entertainment split, making Dover Motorsports. From 2007 to 2009, the speedway worked on an improvement project called "The Monster Makeover", which expanded facilities at the track and beautified the track. After the 2014 season, the track's capacity was reduced to 95,500 seats. In 2022, Speedway Motorsports purchased the track.

==== Entry list ====
- (R) denotes rookie driver.
- (i) denotes the driver ineligible for series driver points.

No.	Driver	Team	Manufacturer
1	Ross Chastain	Trackhouse Racing	Chevrolet
2	Austin Cindric	Team Penske	Ford
3	Austin Dillon	Richard Childress Racing	Chevrolet
4	Kevin Harvick	Stewart-Haas Racing	Ford
5	Kyle Larson	Hendrick Motorsports	Chevrolet
6	Brad Keselowski	RFK Racing	Ford
7	Corey LaJoie	Spire Motorsports	Chevrolet
8	Kyle Busch	Richard Childress Racing	Chevrolet
9	Chase Elliott	Hendrick Motorsports	Chevrolet
10	Aric Almirola	Stewart-Haas Racing	Ford
11	Denny Hamlin	Joe Gibbs Racing	Toyota
12	Ryan Blaney	Team Penske	Ford
14	Chase Briscoe	Stewart-Haas Racing	Ford
15	Brennan Poole (i)	Rick Ware Racing	Ford
16	A. J. Allmendinger	Kaulig Racing	Chevrolet
17	Chris Buescher	RFK Racing	Ford
19	Martin Truex Jr.	Joe Gibbs Racing	Toyota
20	Christopher Bell	Joe Gibbs Racing	Toyota
21	Harrison Burton	Wood Brothers Racing	Ford
22	Joey Logano	Team Penske	Ford
23	Bubba Wallace	23XI Racing	Toyota
24	William Byron	Hendrick Motorsports	Chevrolet
31	Justin Haley	Kaulig Racing	Chevrolet
34	Michael McDowell	Front Row Motorsports	Ford
38	Todd Gilliland	Front Row Motorsports	Ford
41	Ryan Preece	Stewart-Haas Racing	Ford
42	Noah Gragson (R)	Legacy Motor Club	Chevrolet
43	Erik Jones	Legacy Motor Club	Chevrolet
45	Tyler Reddick	23XI Racing	Toyota
47	Ricky Stenhouse Jr.	JTG Daugherty Racing	Chevrolet
48	Josh Berry (i) (Note: Josh Berry replaced Alex Bowman after Bowman sustained a back injury in a sprint car accident.)	Hendrick Motorsports	Chevrolet
51	J. J. Yeley (i)	Rick Ware Racing	Ford
54	Ty Gibbs (R)	Joe Gibbs Racing	Toyota
77	Ty Dillon	Spire Motorsports	Chevrolet
78	B. J. McLeod	Live Fast Motorsports	Chevrolet
99	Daniel Suárez	Trackhouse Racing	Chevrolet
Official entry list

== Practice ==
Brad Keselowski was the fastest in the practice session with a time of 22.690 seconds and a speed of 158.660 mph (255.339 km/h).

=== Practice results ===
Pos	No.	Driver	Team	Manufacturer	Time	Speed
1	6	Brad Keselowski	RFK Racing	Ford	22.690	158.660
2	5	Kyle Larson	Hendrick Motorsports	Chevrolet	22.809	157.832
3	24	William Byron	Hendrick Motorsports	Chevrolet	22.815	157.791
Official practice results

== Qualifying ==
Qualifying was cancelled due to inclement weather. Kyle Busch was awarded the pole for the race as a result of NASCAR's pandemic formula with a score of 3.500

=== Starting lineup ===
Pos	No.	Driver	Team	Manufacturer
1	8	Kyle Busch	Richard Childress Racing	Chevrolet
2	20	Christopher Bell	Joe Gibbs Racing	Toyota
3	12	Ryan Blaney	Team Penske	Ford
4	6	Brad Keselowski	RFK Racing	Ford
5	17	Chris Buescher	RFK Racing	Ford
6	14	Chase Briscoe	Stewart-Haas Racing	Ford
7	45	Tyler Reddick	23XI Racing	Toyota
8	24	William Byron	Hendrick Motorsports	Chevrolet
9	47	Ricky Stenhouse Jr.	JTG Daugherty Racing	Chevrolet
10	9	Chase Elliott	Hendrick Motorsports	Chevrolet
11	43	Erik Jones	Legacy Motor Club	Chevrolet
12	4	Kevin Harvick	Stewart-Haas Racing	Ford
13	11	Denny Hamlin	Joe Gibbs Racing	Toyota
14	1	Ross Chastain	Trackhouse Racing	Chevrolet
15	99	Daniel Suárez	Trackhouse Racing	Chevrolet
16	77	Ty Dillon	Spire Motorsports	Chevrolet
17	19	Martin Truex Jr.	Joe Gibbs Racing	Toyota
18	5	Kyle Larson	Hendrick Motorsports	Chevrolet
19	10	Aric Almirola	Stewart-Haas Racing	Ford
20	2	Austin Cindric	Team Penske	Ford
21	51	J. J. Yeley (i)	Rick Ware Racing	Ford
22	78	B. J. McLeod	Live Fast Motorsports	Chevrolet
23	48	Josh Berry (i)	Hendrick Motorsports	Chevrolet
24	54	Ty Gibbs (R)	Joe Gibbs Racing	Toyota
25	31	Justin Haley	Kaulig Racing	Chevrolet
26	22	Joey Logano	Team Penske	Ford
27	7	Corey LaJoie	Spire Motorsports	Chevrolet
28	23	Bubba Wallace	23XI Racing	Toyota
29	16	A. J. Allmendinger	Kaulig Racing	Chevrolet
30	41	Ryan Preece	Stewart-Haas Racing	Ford
31	21	Harrison Burton	Wood Brothers Racing	Ford
32	34	Michael McDowell	Front Row Motorsports	Ford
33	42	Noah Gragson (R)	Legacy Motor Club	Chevrolet
34	15	Brennan Poole (i)	Rick Ware Racing	Ford
35	38	Todd Gilliland	Front Row Motorsports	Ford
36	3	Austin Dillon	Richard Childress Racing	Chevrolet
Official qualifying results

== Race ==
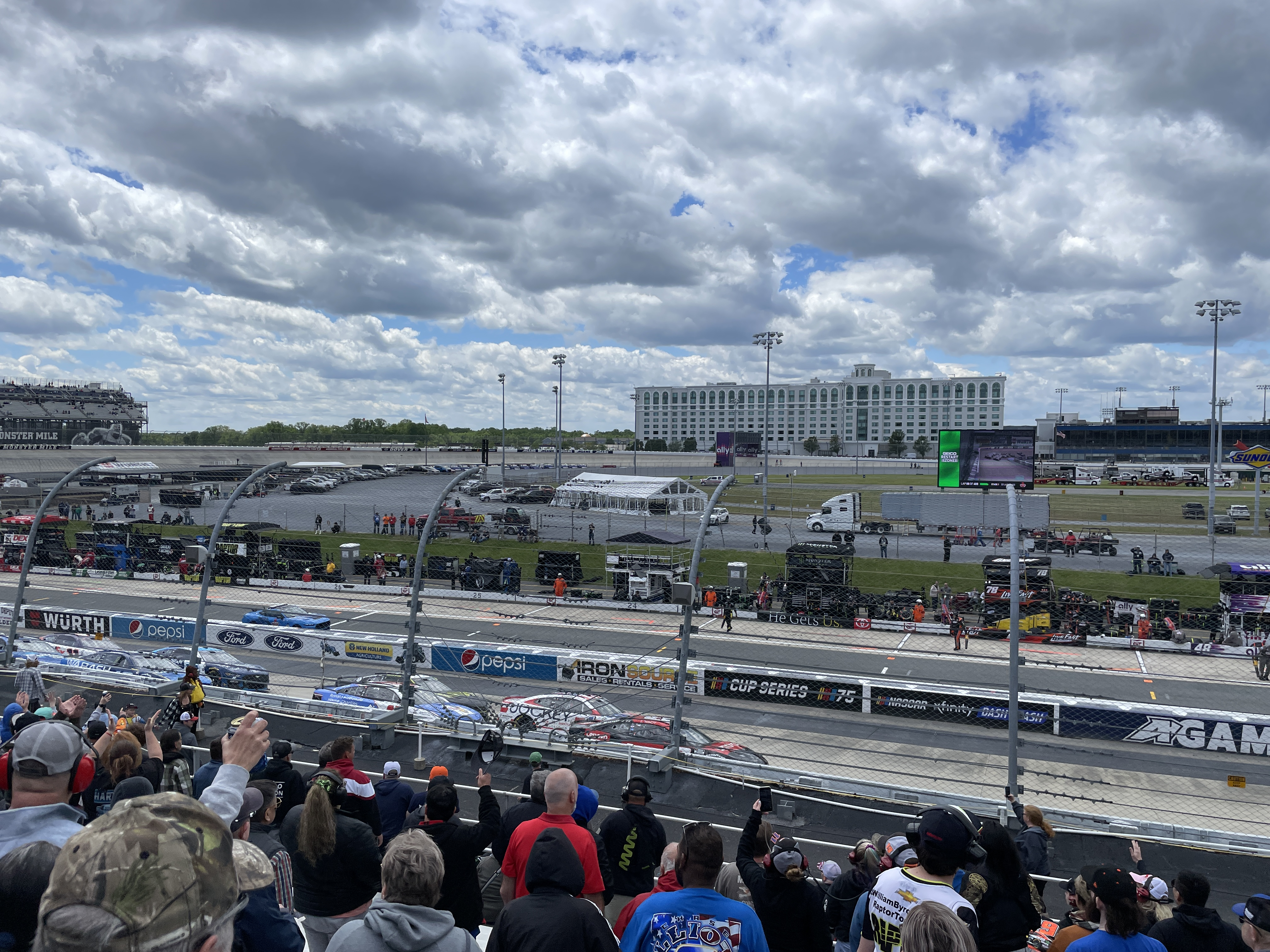
Pole-sitter Kyle Busch leads the field following a restart

=== Race results ===
==== Stage results ====
Stage One Laps: 120

Pos	No	Driver	Team	Manufacturer	Points
1	24	William Byron	Hendrick Motorsports	Chevrolet	10
2	11	Denny Hamlin	Joe Gibbs Racing	Toyota	9
3	12	Ryan Blaney	Team Penske	Ford	8
4	6	Brad Keselowski	RFK Racing	Ford	7
5	1	Ross Chastain	Trackhouse Racing	Chevrolet	6
6	17	Chris Buescher	RFK Racing	Ford	5
7	20	Christopher Bell	Joe Gibbs Racing	Toyota	4
8	4	Kevin Harvick	Stewart-Haas Racing	Ford	3
9	19	Martin Truex Jr.	Joe Gibbs Racing	Toyota	2
10	47	Ricky Stenhouse Jr.	JTG Daugherty Racing	Chevrolet	1
Official stage one results

Stage Two Laps: 130

Pos	No	Driver	Team	Manufacturer	Points
1	1	Ross Chastain	Trackhouse Racing	Chevrolet	10
2	24	William Byron	Hendrick Motorsports	Chevrolet	9
3	12	Ryan Blaney	Team Penske	Ford	8
4	19	Martin Truex Jr.	Joe Gibbs Racing	Toyota	7
5	11	Denny Hamlin	Joe Gibbs Racing	Toyota	6
6	54	Ty Gibbs (R)	Joe Gibbs Racing	Toyota	5
7	17	Chris Buescher	RFK Racing	Ford	4
8	45	Tyler Reddick	23XI Racing	Toyota	3
9	9	Chase Elliott	Hendrick Motorsports	Chevrolet	2
10	20	Christopher Bell	Joe Gibbs Racing	Toyota	1
Official stage two results

=== Final Stage results ===
Stage Three Laps: 150

Pos	Grid	No	Driver	Team	Manufacturer	Laps	Points
1	17	19	Martin Truex Jr.	Joe Gibbs Racing	Toyota	400	49
2	14	1	Ross Chastain	Trackhouse Racing	Chevrolet	400	51
3	3	12	Ryan Blaney	Team Penske	Ford	400	50
4	8	24	William Byron	Hendrick Motorsports	Chevrolet	400	52
5	13	11	Denny Hamlin	Joe Gibbs Racing	Toyota	400	47
6	2	20	Christopher Bell	Joe Gibbs Racing	Toyota	400	36
7	7	45	Tyler Reddick	23XI Racing	Toyota	400	33
8	4	6	Brad Keselowski	RFK Racing	Ford	400	36
9	5	17	Chris Buescher	RFK Racing	Ford	400	37
10	23	48	Josh Berry (i)	Hendrick Motorsports	Chevrolet	400	0
11	10	9	Chase Elliott	Hendrick Motorsports	Chevrolet	400	28
12	28	23	Bubba Wallace	23XI Racing	Toyota	400	25
13	24	54	Ty Gibbs (R)	Joe Gibbs Racing	Toyota	399	29
14	27	7	Corey LaJoie	Spire Motorsports	Chevrolet	399	23
15	9	47	Ricky Stenhouse Jr.	JTG Daugherty Racing	Chevrolet	399	23
16	11	43	Erik Jones	Legacy Motor Club	Chevrolet	399	21
17	30	41	Ryan Preece	Stewart-Haas Racing	Ford	399	20
18	29	16	A. J. Allmendinger	Kaulig Racing	Chevrolet	399	19
19	12	4	Kevin Harvick	Stewart-Haas Racing	Ford	399	21
20	31	21	Harrison Burton	Wood Brothers Racing	Ford	398	17
21	1	8	Kyle Busch	Richard Childress Racing	Chevrolet	397	16
22	32	34	Michael McDowell	Front Row Motorsports	Ford	397	15
23	25	31	Justin Haley	Kaulig Racing	Chevrolet	397	14
24	19	10	Aric Almirola	Stewart-Haas Racing	Ford	397	13
25	35	38	Todd Gilliland	Front Row Motorsports	Ford	396	12
26	20	2	Austin Cindric	Team Penske	Ford	396	11
27	36	3	Austin Dillon	Richard Childress Racing	Chevrolet	395	10
28	21	51	J. J. Yeley (i)	Rick Ware Racing	Ford	393	0
29	22	78	B. J. McLeod	Live Fast Motorsports	Chevrolet	381	8
30	6	14	Chase Briscoe	Stewart-Haas Racing	Ford	378	7
31	26	22	Joey Logano	Team Penske	Ford	375	6
32	18	5	Kyle Larson	Hendrick Motorsports	Chevrolet	359	5
33	34	15	Brennan Poole (i)	Rick Ware Racing	Ford	79	0
34	33	42	Noah Gragson (R)	Legacy Motor Club	Chevrolet	43	3
35	15	99	Daniel Suárez	Trackhouse Racing	Chevrolet	35	2
36	16	77	Ty Dillon	Spire Motorsports	Chevrolet	34	1
Official race results

=== Race statistics ===
- Lead changes: 19 among 8 different drivers
- Cautions/Laps: 7 for 46 laps
- Red flags: 0
- Time of race: 3 hours, 27 minutes, and 47 seconds
- Average speed: 115.505 miles per hour (185.887 km/h)

== Media ==
=== Television ===
Fox Sports covered the race on the television side. Mike Joy, Clint Bowyer and 1989 NASCAR Cup Series champion and two-time Dover winner Rusty Wallace called the race from the broadcast booth. Jamie Little and Regan Smith handled the pit road for the television side. Larry McReynolds provided insight from the Fox Sports studio in Charlotte.

FS1
Booth announcers	Pit reporters	In-race analyst
Lap-by-lap: Mike Joy; Color-commentator: Clint Bowyer; Color-commentator: Rusty Wallace	Jamie Little; Regan Smith	Larry McReynolds

=== Radio ===
PRN had the radio call for the race and was also simulcasted on Sirius XM NASCAR Radio. This was the first Dover race covered by PRN as the radio rights was shifted from MRN Radio after the 2022 season. Doug Rice & Mark Garrow called the race from the broadcast booth when the field raced down the front straightaway. Pat Patterson called the race from atop a scaffold when the field raced thru turns 3 & 4. Brad Gillie, Brett McMillan, and Wendy Venturini called the race for PRN from pit lane.

PRN
Booth announcers	Turn announcers	Pit reporters
Lead announcer: Doug Rice; Announcer: Mark Garrow	Backstretch: Pat Patterson	Brad Gillie; Brett McMillan; Wendy Venturini

== Standings after the race ==
Drivers' Championship standings

	Pos	Driver	Points
1	1	Ross Chastain	370
1	2	Christopher Bell	367 (–3)
	3	Kevin Harvick	332 (–38)
3	4	Martin Truex Jr.	330 (–40)
3	5	Ryan Blaney	326 (–44)
	6	Tyler Reddick	319 (–51)
3	7	Denny Hamlin	317 (–53)
3	8	Kyle Busch	306 (–64)
3	9	Brad Keselowski	303 (–67)
6	10	Kyle Larson	300 (–70)
3	11	William Byron	297 (–73)
4	12	Chris Buescher	277 (–93)
2	13	Joey Logano	274 (–96)
1	14	Ricky Stenhouse Jr.	270 (–100)
6	15	Alex Bowman	270 (–100)
1	16	Chase Briscoe	250 (–120)
Official driver's standings

Manufacturers' Championship standings

Pos	Manufacturer	Points
1	Chevrolet	417
2	Toyota	382 (–35)
3	Ford	372 (–45)

- Note: Only the first 16 positions are included for the driver standings.
- . – Driver has clinched a position in the NASCAR Cup Series playoffs.

== Notes ==
Previous race: 2023 GEICO 500	NASCAR Cup Series; 2023 season	Next race: 2023 AdventHealth 400
