= 2026 AdventHealth 400 =

Race details
- Race 9 of 36 in the 2026 NASCAR Cup Series
- Date: April 19, 2026
- Location: Kansas Speedway in Kansas City, Kansas, U.S.
- Course: Permanent racing facility
- Course length: 1.5 miles (2.4 km)
- Distance: 274 laps, 411 mi (657.6 km)
- Scheduled distance: 267 laps, 400.5 mi (644.542 km)
- Weather: Clear 71 °F (22 °C)
- Average speed: 146.22 miles per hour (235.32 km/h)

Pole position
| Driver | Tyler Reddick | 23XI Racing |
- Time: 29.142

Most laps led
| Driver | Denny Hamlin | Joe Gibbs Racing |
- Laps: 131

Fastest lap
| Driver | Christopher Bell | Joe Gibbs Racing |
- Time: 29.925

Winner
| No. 45 | Tyler Reddick | 23XI Racing |

Television in the United States
- Network: Fox
- Announcers: Mike Joy, Clint Bowyer, and Kevin Harvick
- Nielsen ratings: 2.926 million

Radio in the United States
- Radio: MRN
- Booth announcers: Alex Hayden, Mike Bagley, and Todd Gordon
- Turn announcers: Dave Moody (1 & 2) and Tim Catafalmo (3 & 4)

The 2026 AdventHealth 400 was a NASCAR Cup Series race that was held on April 19, 2026, at Kansas Speedway in Kansas City, Kansas. Contested over 274 laps on the 1.5-mile (2.4 km) asphalt speedway, extended from the original 267 laps due to a overtime finish, it was the 9th race of the 2026 NASCAR Cup Series season.

Tyler Reddick won the race. Kyle Larson finished 2nd, and Chase Briscoe finished 3rd. Denny Hamlin and Bubba Wallace rounded out the top five, and Brad Keselowski, William Byron, Chase Elliott, Ty Gibbs, and Chris Buescher rounded out the top ten.

== Report ==
=== Background ===
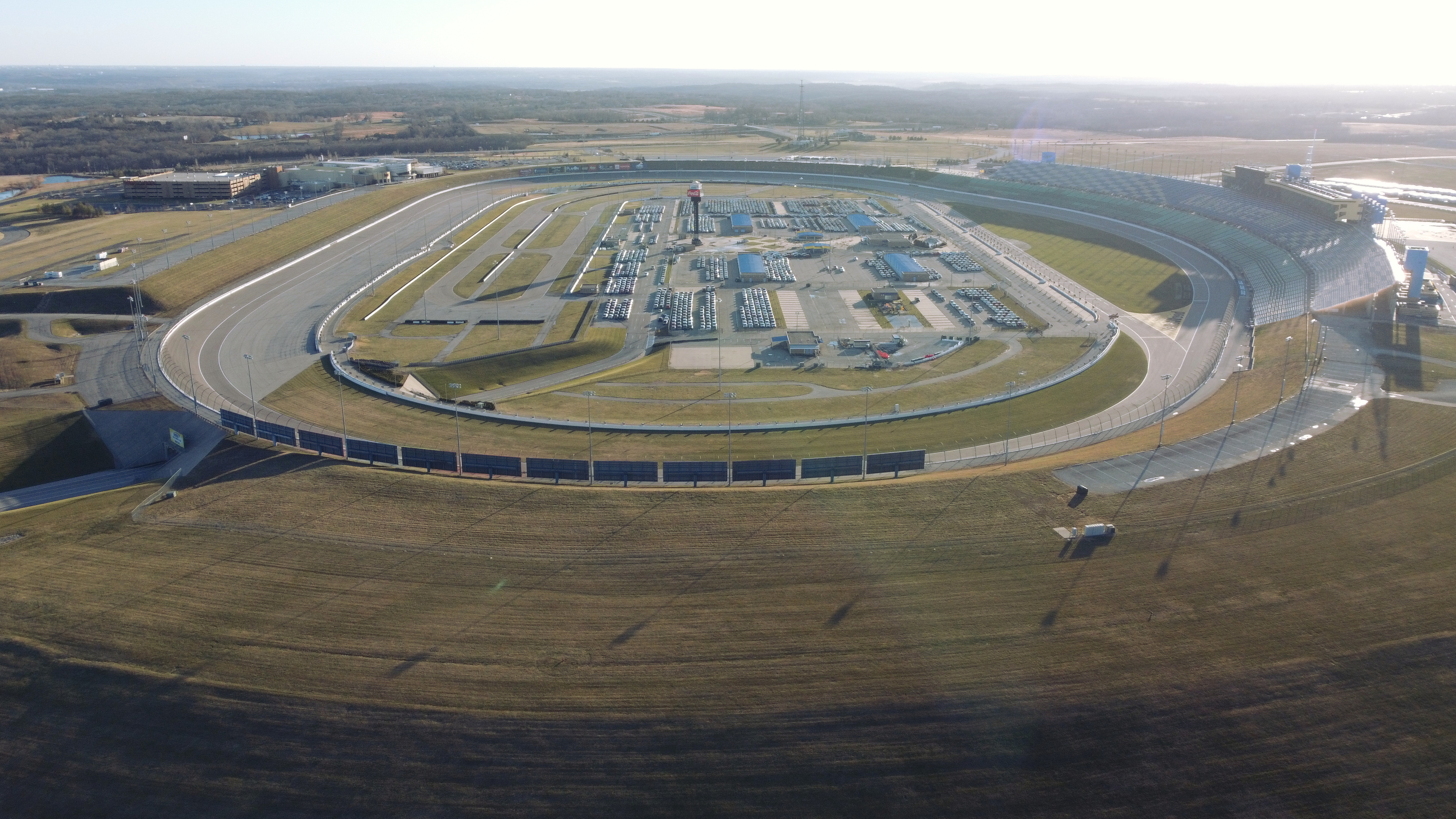
The layout of Kansas Speedway, the venue where the race was held.

Kansas Speedway is a 1.5-mile (2.4 km) tri-oval race track in Kansas City, Kansas. It was built in 2001 and hosts two annual NASCAR race weekends. The NTT IndyCar Series also raced there until 2011. The speedway is owned and operated by NASCAR.

==== Entry list ====
- (R) denotes rookie driver.
- (i) denotes driver who is ineligible for series driver points.

| No. | Driver | Team | Manufacturer |
|---|---|---|---|
| 1 | Ross Chastain | Trackhouse Racing | Chevrolet |
| 2 | Austin Cindric | Team Penske | Ford |
| 3 | Austin Dillon | Richard Childress Racing | Chevrolet |
| 4 | Noah Gragson | Front Row Motorsports | Ford |
| 5 | Kyle Larson | Hendrick Motorsports | Chevrolet |
| 6 | Brad Keselowski | RFK Racing | Ford |
| 7 | Daniel Suárez | Spire Motorsports | Chevrolet |
| 8 | Kyle Busch | Richard Childress Racing | Chevrolet |
| 9 | Chase Elliott | Hendrick Motorsports | Chevrolet |
| 10 | Ty Dillon | Kaulig Racing | Chevrolet |
| 11 | Denny Hamlin | Joe Gibbs Racing | Toyota |
| 12 | Ryan Blaney | Team Penske | Ford |
| 16 | A. J. Allmendinger | Kaulig Racing | Chevrolet |
| 17 | Chris Buescher | RFK Racing | Ford |
| 19 | Chase Briscoe | Joe Gibbs Racing | Toyota |
| 20 | Christopher Bell | Joe Gibbs Racing | Toyota |
| 21 | Josh Berry | Wood Brothers Racing | Ford |
| 22 | Joey Logano | Team Penske | Ford |
| 23 | Bubba Wallace | 23XI Racing | Toyota |
| 24 | William Byron | Hendrick Motorsports | Chevrolet |
| 34 | Todd Gilliland | Front Row Motorsports | Ford |
| 35 | Riley Herbst | 23XI Racing | Toyota |
| 38 | Zane Smith | Front Row Motorsports | Ford |
| 41 | Cole Custer | Haas Factory Team | Chevrolet |
| 42 | John Hunter Nemechek | Legacy Motor Club | Toyota |
| 43 | Erik Jones | Legacy Motor Club | Toyota |
| 45 | Tyler Reddick | 23XI Racing | Toyota |
| 47 | Ricky Stenhouse Jr. | Hyak Motorsports | Chevrolet |
| 48 | Alex Bowman | Hendrick Motorsports | Chevrolet |
| 51 | Cody Ware | Rick Ware Racing | Chevrolet |
| 54 | Ty Gibbs | Joe Gibbs Racing | Toyota |
| 60 | Ryan Preece | RFK Racing | Ford |
| 67 | Corey Heim (i) | 23XI Racing | Toyota |
| 71 | Michael McDowell | Spire Motorsports | Chevrolet |
| 77 | Carson Hocevar | Spire Motorsports | Chevrolet |
| 88 | Connor Zilisch (R) | Trackhouse Racing | Chevrolet |
| 97 | Shane van Gisbergen | Trackhouse Racing | Chevrolet |
Official entry list

== Practice ==
Tyler Reddick was the fastest in the practice session with a time of 29.559 seconds and a speed of 182.685 mph (294.003 km/h).

=== Practice results ===
| Pos | No. | Driver | Team | Manufacturer | Time | Speed |
|---|---|---|---|---|---|---|
| 1 | 45 | Tyler Reddick | 23XI Racing | Toyota | 29.559 | 182.685 |
| 2 | 23 | Bubba Wallace | 23XI Racing | Toyota | 29.665 | 182.032 |
| 3 | 11 | Denny Hamlin | Joe Gibbs Racing | Toyota | 29.765 | 181.421 |
Official practice results

== Qualifying ==
Tyler Reddick scored the pole for the race with a time of 29.142 and a speed of 185.300 mph (298.211 km/h).

=== Qualifying results ===
| Pos | No. | Driver | Team | Manufacturer | Time | Speed |
|---|---|---|---|---|---|---|
| 1 | 45 | Tyler Reddick | 23XI Racing | Toyota | 29.142 | 185.300 |
| 2 | 11 | Denny Hamlin | Joe Gibbs Racing | Toyota | 29.161 | 185.179 |
| 3 | 54 | Ty Gibbs | Joe Gibbs Racing | Toyota | 29.192 | 184.982 |
| 4 | 5 | Kyle Larson | Hendrick Motorsports | Chevrolet | 29.192 | 184.982 |
| 5 | 19 | Chase Briscoe | Joe Gibbs Racing | Toyota | 29.199 | 184.938 |
| 6 | 77 | Carson Hocevar | Spire Motorsports | Chevrolet | 29.212 | 184.856 |
| 7 | 17 | Chris Buescher | RFK Racing | Ford | 29.227 | 184.761 |
| 8 | 7 | Daniel Suárez | Spire Motorsports | Chevrolet | 29.230 | 184.742 |
| 9 | 12 | Ryan Blaney | Team Penske | Ford | 29.231 | 184.735 |
| 10 | 23 | Bubba Wallace | 23XI Racing | Toyota | 29.280 | 184.426 |
| 11 | 20 | Christopher Bell | Joe Gibbs Racing | Toyota | 29.325 | 184.143 |
| 12 | 60 | Ryan Preece | RFK Racing | Ford | 29.367 | 183.880 |
| 13 | 9 | Chase Elliott | Hendrick Motorsports | Chevrolet | 29.402 | 183.661 |
| 14 | 24 | William Byron | Hendrick Motorsports | Chevrolet | 29.504 | 183.026 |
| 15 | 22 | Joey Logano | Team Penske | Ford | 29.507 | 183.007 |
| 16 | 47 | Ricky Stenhouse Jr. | Hyak Motorsports | Chevrolet | 29.532 | 182.852 |
| 17 | 97 | Shane van Gisbergen | Trackhouse Racing | Chevrolet | 29.537 | 182.822 |
| 18 | 71 | Michael McDowell | Spire Motorsports | Chevrolet | 29.541 | 182.797 |
| 19 | 43 | Erik Jones | Legacy Motor Club | Toyota | 29.561 | 182.673 |
| 20 | 3 | Austin Dillon | Richard Childress Racing | Chevrolet | 29.569 | 182.624 |
| 21 | 6 | Brad Keselowski | RFK Racing | Ford | 29.577 | 182.574 |
| 22 | 35 | Riley Herbst | 23XI Racing | Toyota | 29.583 | 182.537 |
| 23 | 8 | Kyle Busch | Richard Childress Racing | Chevrolet | 29.653 | 182.106 |
| 24 | 67 | Corey Heim (i) | 23XI Racing | Toyota | 29.664 | 182.039 |
| 25 | 38 | Zane Smith | Front Row Motorsports | Ford | 29.670 | 182.002 |
| 26 | 34 | Todd Gilliland | Front Row Motorsports | Ford | 29.723 | 181.677 |
| 27 | 16 | A. J. Allmendinger | Kaulig Racing | Chevrolet | 29.726 | 181.659 |
| 28 | 4 | Noah Gragson | Front Row Motorsports | Ford | 29.739 | 181.580 |
| 29 | 41 | Cole Custer | Haas Factory Team | Chevrolet | 29.739 | 181.580 |
| 30 | 21 | Josh Berry | Wood Brothers Racing | Ford | 29.768 | 181.403 |
| 31 | 1 | Ross Chastain | Trackhouse Racing | Chevrolet | 29.781 | 181.324 |
| 32 | 42 | John Hunter Nemechek | Legacy Motor Club | Toyota | 29.831 | 181.020 |
| 33 | 48 | Alex Bowman | Hendrick Motorsports | Chevrolet | 29.849 | 180.911 |
| 34 | 2 | Austin Cindric | Team Penske | Ford | 30.014 | 179.916 |
| 35 | 51 | Cody Ware | Rick Ware Racing | Chevrolet | 30.199 | 178.814 |
| 36 | 88 | Connor Zilisch (R) | Trackhouse Racing | Chevrolet | 30.246 | 178.536 |
| 37 | 10 | Ty Dillon | Kaulig Racing | Chevrolet | 31.364 | 172.172 |
Official qualifying results

== Race ==
=== Race results ===
==== Stage Results ====
Stage One Laps: 80

| Pos | No | Driver | Team | Manufacturer | Points |
|---|---|---|---|---|---|
| 1 | 11 | Denny Hamlin | Joe Gibbs Racing | Toyota | 10 |
| 2 | 5 | Kyle Larson | Hendrick Motorsports | Chevrolet | 9 |
| 3 | 45 | Tyler Reddick | 23XI Racing | Toyota | 8 |
| 4 | 54 | Ty Gibbs | Joe Gibbs Racing | Toyota | 7 |
| 5 | 20 | Christopher Bell | Joe Gibbs Racing | Toyota | 6 |
| 6 | 9 | Chase Elliott | Hendrick Motorsports | Chevrolet | 5 |
| 7 | 19 | Chase Briscoe | Joe Gibbs Racing | Toyota | 4 |
| 8 | 77 | Carson Hocevar | Spire Motorsports | Chevrolet | 3 |
| 9 | 23 | Bubba Wallace | 23XI Racing | Toyota | 2 |
| 10 | 67 | Corey Heim (i) | 23XI Racing | Toyota | 0 |

Stage Two Laps: 85

| Pos | No | Driver | Team | Manufacturer | Points |
|---|---|---|---|---|---|
| 1 | 5 | Kyle Larson | Hendrick Motorsports | Chevrolet | 10 |
| 2 | 11 | Denny Hamlin | Joe Gibbs Racing | Toyota | 9 |
| 3 | 45 | Tyler Reddick | 23XI Racing | Toyota | 8 |
| 4 | 9 | Chase Elliott | Hendrick Motorsports | Chevrolet | 7 |
| 5 | 20 | Christopher Bell | Joe Gibbs Racing | Toyota | 6 |
| 6 | 23 | Bubba Wallace | 23XI Racing | Toyota | 5 |
| 7 | 6 | Brad Keselowski | RFK Racing | Ford | 4 |
| 8 | 54 | Ty Gibbs | Joe Gibbs Racing | Toyota | 3 |
| 9 | 17 | Chris Buescher | RFK Racing | Ford | 2 |
| 10 | 77 | Carson Hocevar | Spire Motorsports | Chevrolet | 1 |

=== Final Stage Results ===
Stage Three Laps: 102

| Pos | Grid | No | Driver | Team | Manufacturer | Laps | Points |
|---|---|---|---|---|---|---|---|
| 1 | 1 | 45 | Tyler Reddick | 23XI Racing | Toyota | 274 | 71 |
| 2 | 4 | 5 | Kyle Larson | Hendrick Motorsports | Chevrolet | 274 | 54 |
| 3 | 5 | 19 | Chase Briscoe | Joe Gibbs Racing | Toyota | 274 | 38 |
| 4 | 2 | 11 | Denny Hamlin | Joe Gibbs Racing | Toyota | 274 | 52 |
| 5 | 10 | 23 | Bubba Wallace | 23XI Racing | Toyota | 274 | 39 |
| 6 | 21 | 6 | Brad Keselowski | RFK Racing | Ford | 274 | 35 |
| 7 | 14 | 24 | William Byron | Hendrick Motorsports | Chevrolet | 274 | 30 |
| 8 | 13 | 9 | Chase Elliott | Hendrick Motorsports | Chevrolet | 274 | 41 |
| 9 | 3 | 54 | Ty Gibbs | Joe Gibbs Racing | Toyota | 274 | 38 |
| 10 | 7 | 17 | Chris Buescher | RFK Racing | Ford | 274 | 29 |
| 11 | 12 | 60 | Ryan Preece | RFK Racing | Ford | 274 | 26 |
| 12 | 34 | 2 | Austin Cindric | Team Penske | Ford | 274 | 25 |
| 13 | 6 | 77 | Carson Hocevar | Spire Motorsports | Chevrolet | 274 | 28 |
| 14 | 22 | 35 | Riley Herbst | 23XI Racing | Toyota | 274 | 23 |
| 15 | 24 | 67 | Corey Heim (i) | 23XI Racing | Toyota | 274 | 0 |
| 16 | 20 | 3 | Austin Dillon | Richard Childress Racing | Chevrolet | 274 | 21 |
| 17 | 26 | 34 | Todd Gilliland | Front Row Motorsports | Ford | 274 | 20 |
| 18 | 33 | 48 | Alex Bowman | Hendrick Motorsports | Chevrolet | 274 | 19 |
| 19 | 8 | 7 | Daniel Suárez | Spire Motorsports | Chevrolet | 274 | 18 |
| 20 | 11 | 20 | Christopher Bell | Joe Gibbs Racing | Toyota | 274 | 30 |
| 21 | 16 | 47 | Ricky Stenhouse Jr. | Hyak Motorsports | Chevrolet | 273 | 16 |
| 22 | 32 | 42 | John Hunter Nemechek | Legacy Motor Club | Toyota | 273 | 15 |
| 23 | 19 | 43 | Erik Jones | Legacy Motor Club | Toyota | 273 | 14 |
| 24 | 9 | 12 | Ryan Blaney | Team Penske | Ford | 273 | 13 |
| 25 | 29 | 41 | Cole Custer | Haas Factory Team | Chevrolet | 273 | 12 |
| 26 | 31 | 1 | Ross Chastain | Trackhouse Racing | Chevrolet | 272 | 11 |
| 27 | 30 | 21 | Josh Berry | Wood Brothers Racing | Ford | 272 | 10 |
| 28 | 28 | 4 | Noah Gragson | Front Row Motorsports | Ford | 272 | 9 |
| 29 | 36 | 88 | Connor Zilisch (R) | Trackhouse Racing | Chevrolet | 272 | 8 |
| 30 | 15 | 22 | Joey Logano | Team Penske | Ford | 272 | 7 |
| 31 | 27 | 16 | A. J. Allmendinger | Kaulig Racing | Chevrolet | 271 | 6 |
| 32 | 25 | 38 | Zane Smith | Front Row Motorsports | Ford | 271 | 5 |
| 33 | 37 | 10 | Ty Dillon | Kaulig Racing | Chevrolet | 271 | 4 |
| 34 | 18 | 71 | Michael McDowell | Spire Motorsports | Chevrolet | 271 | 3 |
| 35 | 23 | 8 | Kyle Busch | Richard Childress Racing | Chevrolet | 270 | 2 |
| 36 | 17 | 97 | Shane van Gisbergen | Trackhouse Racing | Chevrolet | 270 | 1 |
| 37 | 35 | 51 | Cody Ware | Rick Ware Racing | Chevrolet | 268 | 1 |
Official race results

=== Race statistics ===
- Lead changes: 17 among 7 different drivers
- Cautions/Laps: 3 for 20
- Red flags: 0
- Time of race: 2 hours, 48 minutes and 39 seconds
- Average speed: 146.22 miles per hour (235.32 km/h)

== Media ==
=== Television ===
For the first time since the 2014 5-hour Energy 400, the race was nationally televised on Fox. Mike Joy, Clint Bowyer, and three-time Kansas winner Kevin Harvick called the race from the broadcast booth. Jamie Little, and Regan Smith handled pit road for the television side, and Larry McReynolds provided insight on-site during the race.

Fox
| Booth announcers | Pit reporters | In-race analyst |
|---|---|---|
| Lap-by-lap: Mike Joy; Color-commentator: Clint Bowyer; Color-commentator: Kevin Harvick | Jamie Little; Regan Smith | Larry McReynolds |

=== Radio ===
MRN had the radio call for the race which was also simulcasted on Sirius XM NASCAR Radio. Alex Hayden, Mike Bagley, and former crew chief Todd Gordon called the race in the booth when the field will race through the tri-oval. Dave Moody covered the race from the Sunoco spotters stand outside turn 2 when the field will race through turns 1 and 2. Tim Catafalmo called the race from a platform outside turn 4. Lead MRN Pit Reporter Steve Post, Jacklyn Drake and Jason Toy worked pit road for the radio side.

MRN
| Booth announcers | Turn announcers | Pit reporters |
|---|---|---|
| Lead announcer: Alex Hayden; Announcer: Mike Bagley; Announcer: Todd Gordon | Turns 1 & 2: Dave Moody; Turns 3 & 4: Tim Catafalmo | Steve Post; Jacklyn Drake; Jason Toy |

== Standings after the race ==
Drivers' Championship standings

| | Pos | Driver | Points |
|---|---|---|---|
| | 1 | Tyler Reddick | 457 |
| 1 | 2 | Denny Hamlin | 352 (–105) |
| 1 | 3 | Ryan Blaney | 337 (–120) |
| | 4 | Ty Gibbs | 319 (–138) |
| 1 | 5 | Kyle Larson | 314 (–143) |
| 1 | 6 | Chase Elliott | 305 (–152) |
| | 7 | William Byron | 275 (–182) |
| | 8 | Bubba Wallace | 275 (–182) |
| 2 | 9 | Brad Keselowski | 264 (–193) |
| 1 | 10 | Christopher Bell | 261 (–196) |
| 1 | 11 | Chris Buescher | 259 (–198) |
| 1 | 12 | Carson Hocevar | 237 (–220) |
| 1 | 13 | Ryan Preece | 235 (–222) |
| 2 | 14 | Joey Logano | 225 (–232) |
| 2 | 15 | Chase Briscoe | 214 (–243) |
| 1 | 16 | Daniel Suárez | 210 (–247) |
Official driver's standings

Manufacturers' Championship standings

| Pos | Manufacturer | Points |
|---|---|---|
| 1 | Toyota | 455 |
| 2 | Chevrolet | 330 (–125) |
| 3 | Ford | 314 (–141) |

- Note: Only the first 16 positions are included for the driver standings.

| Previous race: 2026 Food City 500 | NASCAR Cup Series; 2026 season | Next race: 2026 Jack Link's 500 |
