= 23XI Racing =

NASCAR team

- Owner(s): Michael Jordan; Denny Hamlin; Curtis Polk
- Principal: Steve Lauletta (President)
- Base: Huntersville, North Carolina
- Series: NASCAR Cup Series
- Race drivers: 23. Bubba Wallace; 45. Tyler Reddick; 67. Corey Heim
- Manufacturer: Toyota
- Opened: 2020
- Website: 23xiracing.com

Career
- Debut: 2021 Daytona 500 (Daytona)
- Latest race: 2026 Season Finale 400 (Homestead)
- Races competed: 216
- Drivers' Championships: 0
- Race victories: 17
- Pole positions: 12

23XI Racing (pronounced twenty-three eleven) is an American professional auto racing organization that competes in the NASCAR Cup Series. It is owned and operated by Hall of Fame basketball player Michael Jordan, along with current Joe Gibbs Racing driver and three-time Daytona 500 winner Denny Hamlin. The team name represents a combination of the number 23 Michael Jordan wore during most of his NBA career and the number 11 which Denny Hamlin has driven his entire Cup series career. The organization fields three full-time entries. They are the No. 23 Toyota Camry for Bubba Wallace, No. 45 Camry for Tyler Reddick, and No. 67 Camry for Corey Heim. They have a technical alliance with Joe Gibbs Racing.

== History ==
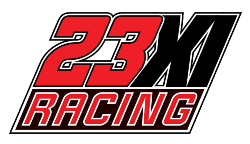
The previous logo for 23XI Racing.

During the summer of 2020, rumors swirled that Michael Jordan intended on purchasing an ownership stake in Richard Petty Motorsports, who fielded the only black driver in the NASCAR Cup Series, Bubba Wallace. Such claims were repeatedly denied by Jordan's management team.

On September 8, 2021, veteran motorsports executive Steve Lauletta was named team president after serving as the interim president since the team's foundation.

On July 12, 2022, 23XI Racing announced that two-time NASCAR Xfinity Series champion Tyler Reddick signed with the team for the 2024 season. On July 23, 2022, Hamlin announced that starting in 2023, 23XI would have its own pit crews instead of leasing them from Joe Gibbs Racing.

In May, 2024, 23XI opened its doors to their brand-new race shop and team headquarters, named "Airspeed", in Huntersville, North Carolina.

=== Antitrust lawsuit with Front Row Motorsports against NASCAR ===
On October 2, 2024, it was announced that 23XI Racing, along with Front Row Motorsports, filed an antitrust lawsuit against NASCAR over the terms of the updated charter agreement, as well as anti-competitive practices committed by the France family. On December 18, both teams were granted a motion of preliminary injunction, allowing them to race as chartered entries in 2025 while continuing their legal battle with NASCAR. The injunction also allowed the transfer of the two Stewart–Haas Racing charters to both teams. On June 5, 2025, the U.S. Court of Appeals overturned the preliminary injunction ruling. On August 25, NASCAR filed a legal notice of its agreement to issue one of the charters to a redacted entity. On December 11, 2025, after eight days in court, the case was settled.

== NASCAR Cup Series ==
=== Car No. 23 history ===
Bubba Wallace (2021–present)

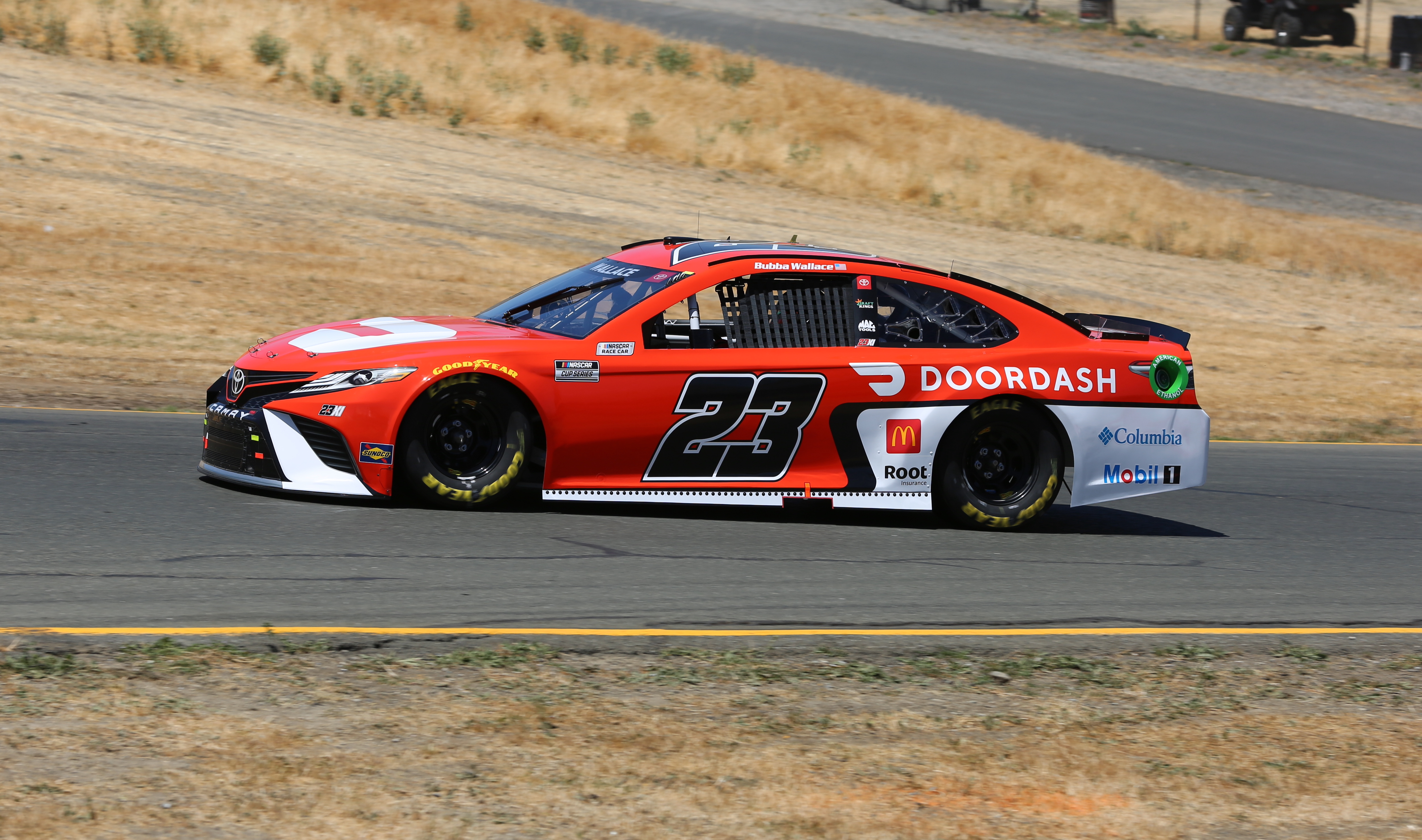
Wallace's No. 23 car during the 2021 Toyota/Save Mart 350

On September 21, 2020, Jordan and Denny Hamlin announced the formation of a Cup team to begin competition in 2021 with Jordan as majority owner, Hamlin as minority owner, and Wallace, who eleven days prior had announced his departure from Richard Petty Motorsports, as their first official driver. The team bought a guaranteed starting spot in every 2021 race by purchasing a charter from Germain Racing. The team's name, car number and manufacturer were not revealed at the time of the announcement. Hamlin later said that the two had discussed owning a team but that it never came to fruition. On October 22, the team announced its name, 23XI Racing, and would use the number 23 (Jordan's number during his basketball career). On October 30, the team revealed that they will run Toyotas with a technical alliance with Joe Gibbs Racing (whose No. 11 car is driven by Hamlin) and operate out of a shop owned (and formerly used) by Germain Racing. On December 14, 23XI Racing announced that DoorDash, McDonald's, Columbia Sportswear, Dr Pepper, and Root, Inc. will be the sponsors of the No. 23 team in 2021. It was also announced that several crew members of the former Germain operation would join the team as a pit crew. On February 3, it was announced that former Germain driver Ty Dillon (who attempted to make the Daytona 500 with fellow Toyota team Gaunt Brothers Racing) would run the car in the 2021 Busch Clash, as Wallace was not eligible to run the clash.

Wallace finished second in his Duel and finished seventeenth at the 2021 Daytona 500 after being involved in a last-lap crash. At the Daytona road course he had troubles all day and finished 26th. Wallace struggled out the gate until Phoenix, which was his first strong run of the season. Wallace was running top-fifteen for most of the day before working his way into the top-ten. Following a caution and most of the field pitting, while Wallace stayed out, he restarted first. This move did not work out well for Wallace. Due to him being on old tires and the rest of the field being on new tires, Wallace was quickly cycled out of the first position, dropped back, and wound up making contact with Cole Custer. He ended up finishing 16th. At the 2021 GEICO 500 at Talladega, Wallace had a strong car the entire day. Wallace was running top-ten for a good portion of the day and ended up winning stage 2. This was Wallace's first career stage win. After an overtime restart, Wallace was cycled to the back of the pack and wound up finishing nineteenth. At Dover, Wallace finished eleventh. At Pocono, Wallace finished the first race in fourteenth, but finished the second race fifth, scoring the team's best finish and their first top-five. He finished third at the 2021 Coke Zero Sugar 400 at Daytona, but he was officially scored with a second place finish after Chris Buescher was disqualified post-inspection. On September 16, Bootie Barker was named crew chief for the remainder of the season after Wheeler was promoted to Director of Competition. Wallace scored his first career win at the rain-shortened 2021 YellaWood 500 at Talladega, becoming only the second Black driver after Wendell Scott to win a Cup race. Wallace finished the season 21st in points.

Wallace began the 2022 season by finishing in second place at the 2022 Daytona 500. On March 29, 2022, Barker was suspended for four races due to a tire and wheel loss during the 2022 Texas Grand Prix at COTA. Dave Rogers was announced as Wallace's crew chief for Richmond, Martinsville, Bristol, and Talladega. Later in the regular season, Wallace showed strong form, posting four consecutive top-10s at New Hampshire, Pocono, Indianapolis road course, and Michigan.

After failing to make the driver playoffs at Daytona, it was announced that Ty Gibbs would switch to the No. 23 to allow Wallace to compete in the owners championship with the No. 45. At the Texas playoff race, Gibbs veered into Ty Dillon on pit road, nearly sending Dillon towards a NASCAR official and a group of pit crew members; he was subsequently fined US$75,000 and the No. 23 was docked 25 owner points. At Phoenix, Daniel Hemric substituted for Gibbs after the death of his father, Coy Gibbs. Hemric finished seventeenth.

Wallace started the 2023 season with a twentieth place finish at the 2023 Daytona 500. He improved his finishes enough to make the playoffs for the first time in his career. Wallace was eliminated from the Round of 12 at the conclusion of the Charlotte Roval race.

During the 2024 season, Wallace was fined US$50,000 for intentionally door-slamming Alex Bowman during the cool-down lap after the Chicago street race. Following the Martinsville playoff race, the No. 23 was docked fifty owner and driver points and Wallace and the team were each fined US$100,000 for race manipulation, when Wallace faked a tire failure and slowed down to allow fellow Toyota driver Christopher Bell to pass him in an attempt to make the Championship 4. In addition, Barker was suspended for the Phoenix finale.

Wallace started the 2025 season with a 29th place DNF at the 2025 Daytona 500. He won at Indianapolis to break a 100-race winless streak and make the playoffs.

==== Car No. 23 results ====
Year	Driver	No.	Make	1	2	3	4	5	6	7	8	9	10	11	12	13	14	15	16	17	18	19	20	21	22	23	24	25	26	27	28	29	30	31	32	33	34	35	36	Owners	Pts
2021	Bubba Wallace	23	Toyota	DAY; 17	DAY; 26	HOM; 22	LVS; 28	PHO; 16	ATL; 16	BRI; 27	MAR; 16	RCH; 26	TAL; 19	KAN; 26	DAR; 21	DOV; 11	COA; 39	CLT; 14	SON; 14	NSH; 20	POC; 14	POC; 5	ROA; 24	ATL; 14	NHA; 26	GLN; 23	IND; 13	MCH; 19	DAY; 2	DAR; 21	RCH; 32	BRI; 16	LVS; 16	TAL; 1	CLT; 14	TEX; 32	KAN; 14	MAR; 25	PHO; 39	21st	699
2022	Bubba Wallace	23	Toyota	DAY; 2	CAL; 19	LVS; 25	PHO; 22	ATL; 13	COA; 38	RCH; 26	MAR; 16	BRI; 28	TAL; 17	DOV; 16	DAR; 27	KAN; 10	CLT; 28	GTW; 26	SON; 36	NSH; 12	ROA; 35	ATL; 14	NHA; 3	POC; 8	IND; 5	MCH; 2	RCH; 13	GLN; 35	DAY; 11											24th	658
2022	Ty Gibbs	23	Toyota																											DAR; 15	KAN; 34	BRI; 35	TEX; 20	TAL; 37	CLT; 22	LVS; 22	HOM; 21	MAR; 19		24th	658
2022	Daniel Hemric	23	Toyota																																				PHO; 17	24th	658
2023	Bubba Wallace	23	Toyota	DAY; 20	CAL; 30	LVS; 4	PHO; 14	ATL; 27	COA; 37	RCH; 22	BRD; 12	MAR; 9	TAL; 28	DOV; 12	KAN; 4	DAR; 5	CLT; 4	GTW; 30	SON; 17	NSH; 15	CSC; 31	ATL; 25	NHA; 8	POC; 11	RCH; 12	MCH; 18	IRC; 18	GLN; 12	DAY; 12	DAR; 7	KAN; 32	BRI; 14	TEX; 3*	TAL; 23	ROV; 16	LVS; 12	HOM; 6	MAR; 11	PHO; 10	17th	899
2024	Bubba Wallace	23	Toyota	DAY; 5	ATL; 5	LVS; 35	PHO; 16	BRI; 29	COA; 15	RCH; 13	MAR; 4	TEX; 7	TAL; 32	DOV; 36	KAN; 17	DAR; 7	CLT; 11	GTW; 21	SON; 20	IOW; 17	NHA; 34	NSH; 7	CSC; 13	POC; 10	IND; 5	RCH; 4	MCH; 26	DAY; 6	DAR; 16	ATL; 29	GLN; 17	BRI; 3	KAN; 17	TAL; 9	ROV; 9	LVS; 12	HOM; 18	MAR; 18	PHO; 7	18th	878
2025	Bubba Wallace	23	Toyota	DAY; 29	ATL; 9	COA; 20	PHO; 29	LVS; 28	HOM; 3	MAR; 3	DAR; 21	BRI; 19	TAL; 8	TEX; 33	KAN; 33	CLT; 35	NSH; 6	MCH; 4	MXC; 12	POC; 36	ATL; 22	CSC; 28	SON; 26	DOV; 6	IND; 1	IOW; 6	GLN; 8	RCH; 28*	DAY; 37	DAR; 6	GTW; 8	BRI; 34	NHA; 26	KAN; 5	ROV; 15	LVS; 22	TAL; 4	MAR; 18	PHO; 37	11th	2256
2026	Bubba Wallace	23	Toyota	DAY; 10*	ATL; 8	COA; 11	PHO; 6	LVS; 9	DAR; 34	MAR; 36	BRI; 11	KAN; 5	TAL; 36	TEX; 9	GLN; 29	CLT; 22	NSH; 32	MCH; 3	POC; 21	COR; 2	SON; 22	CHI; 6	ATL; 29	NWS; 6	IND; 28	IOW; 12	RCH; 20	NHA; 2	DAY; 20	DAR; 8	GTW; 14	BRI; 7	KAN; 9	LVS; 8	CLT; 37	PHO; 17	TAL; 22	MAR; 8	HOM; 5	11th	2293

=== Car No. 35 history ===
Riley Herbst (2025–2026)

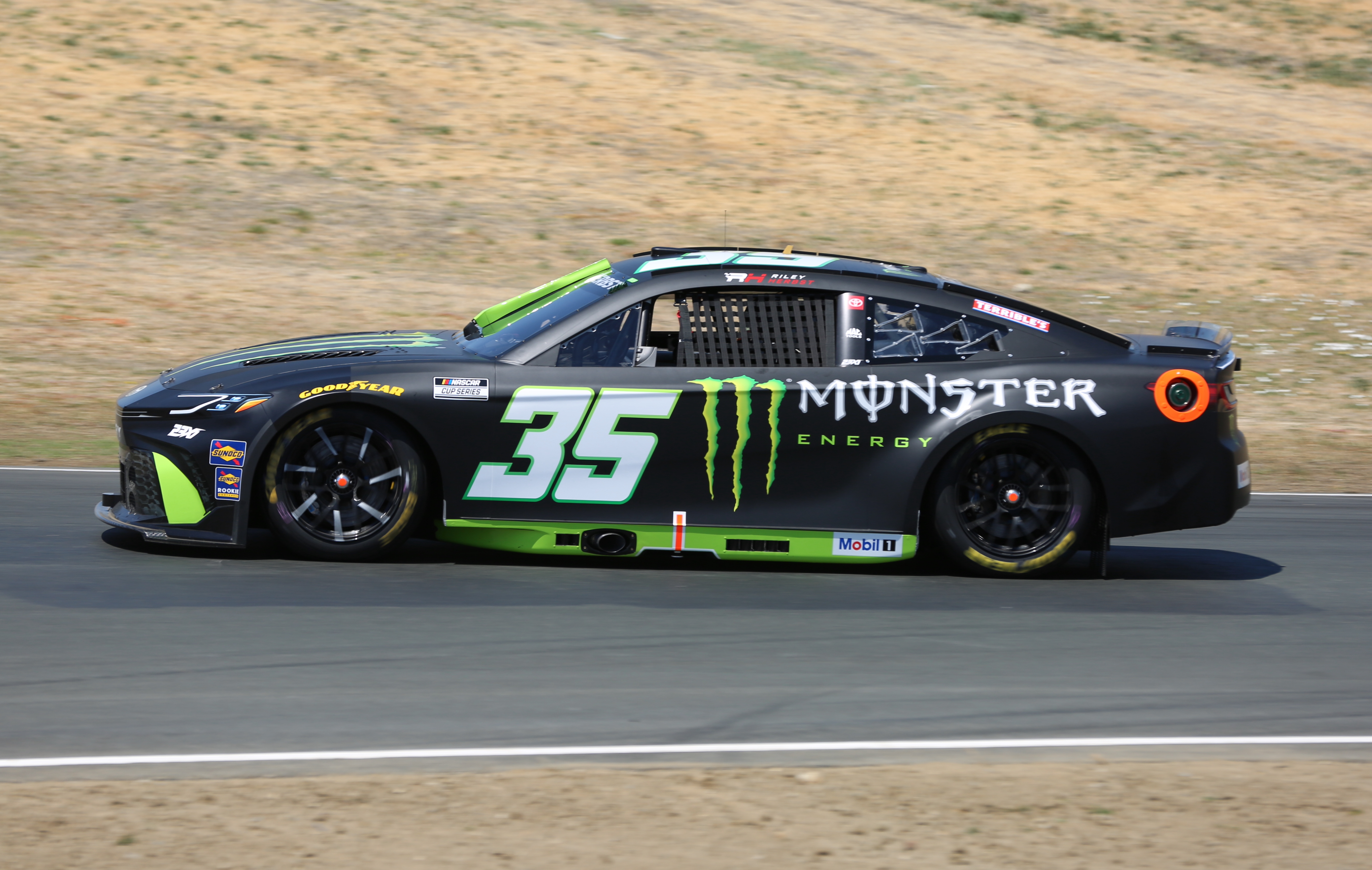
Riley Herbst in the No. 35 car at Sonoma Raceway in 2025

On November 20, 2024, 23XI announced that Riley Herbst would drive the No. 35 for the 2025 season. The No. 35 was chosen by 23XI as an homage to Jordan's Minor League Baseball career. He started the season with a seventeenth-place at the 2025 Daytona 500. Herbst struggled throughout the season, failing to score a single top-ten finish and only finishing inside the top-twenty-eight times with a best finish of fourteenth at Texas, and finished 35th in the final standings. Shortly after the Charlotte Roval race, the No. 35 car was disqualified for failing post-race height inspection.

Herbst started the 2026 season with an eighth-place finish at the 2026 Daytona 500. On May 30, 2026, it was announced that Corey Heim would be replacing Riley Herbst but would be staying in the No. 67 starting with the 2027 season. Herbst will move to Legacy Motor Club's No. 84 starting in 2027.

==== Car No. 35 results ====
Year	Driver	No.	Make	1	2	3	4	5	6	7	8	9	10	11	12	13	14	15	16	17	18	19	20	21	22	23	24	25	26	27	28	29	30	31	32	33	34	35	36	Owners	Pts
2025	Riley Herbst	35	Toyota	DAY; 17	ATL; 17	COA; 17	PHO; 37	LVS; 19	HOM; 33	MAR; 31	DAR; 34	BRI; 28	TAL; 22	TEX; 14	KAN; 27	CLT; 28	NSH; 24	MCH; 25	MXC; 29	POC; 37	ATL; 28	CSC; 17	SON; 25	DOV; 24	IND; 26	IOW; 30	GLN; 24	RCH; 31	DAY; 40	DAR; 28	GTW; 31	BRI; 18	NHA; 22	KAN; 22	ROV; 37	LVS; 17	TAL; 32	MAR; 36	PHO; 23	35th	399
2026	Riley Herbst	35	Toyota	DAY; 8	ATL; 33	COA; 23	PHO; 18	LVS; 23	DAR; 35	MAR; 35	BRI; 21	KAN; 14	TAL; 36	TEX; 11	GLN; 26	CLT; 21	NSH; 17	MCH; 13	POC; 16	COR; 8	SON; 30	CHI; 10	ATL; 35	NWS; 18	IND; 36	IOW; 21	RCH; 24	NHA; 34	DAY; INQ	DAR; 30	GTW; 34	BRI; 34	KAN; 25	LVS; 18	CLT; 18	PHO; 32	TAL; 26	MAR; 32	HOM; 33	29th	520
2026	Harrison Burton	35	Toyota																										DAY; 12											29th	520

=== Car No. 45 history ===
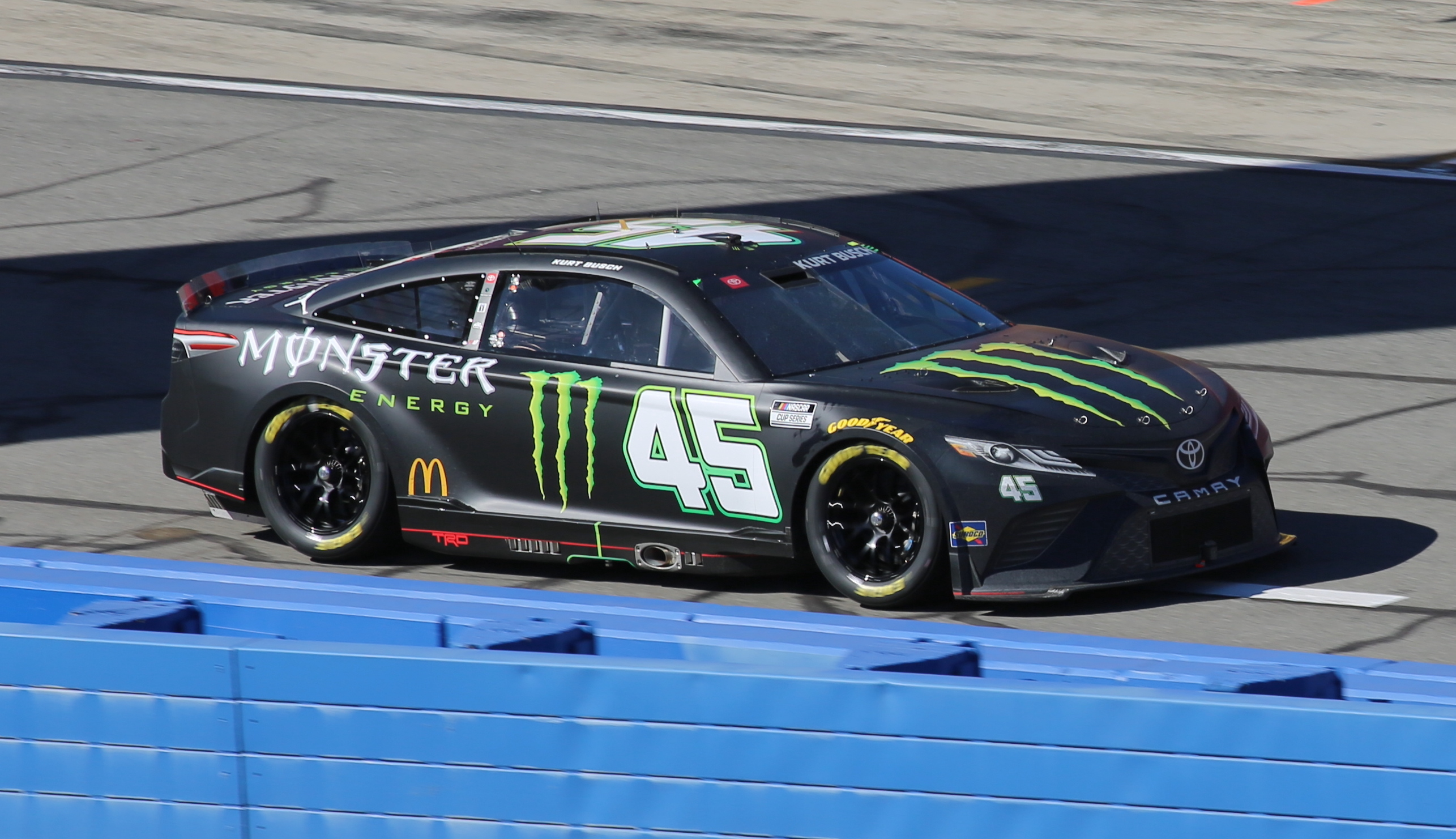
Kurt Busch in the No. 45 at Auto Club Speedway in 2022

Kurt Busch (2022)

On August 27, 2021, 23XI Racing announced that Kurt Busch will pilot the No. 45 Toyota Camry in 2022 (With the number 45 being a reference to a jersey number Jordan wore during his baseball career and for 23 games during the 1994–95 NBA season.) His long time sponsor Monster Energy would follow him over. Following the end of the 2021 season, 23XI purchased the former StarCom Racing's charter for US$13.5 million, making it the most expensive charter purchase since the implementation of the system in 2016.

Busch began his 2022 season with a nineteenth place finish at the 2022 Daytona 500. Despite a promising start with top-five finishes at Phoenix and Atlanta, he suffered from poor finishes at COTA, Richmond, Bristol dirt, Dover, and Darlington. However, he rebounded with a win at Kansas. At the Pocono race, Busch was not medically cleared after a crash during qualifying, and subsequently missed the last five races of the regular season. Xfinity Series driver Ty Gibbs substituted Busch for the next six races. He finished sixteenth at Pocono and seventeenth at Indianapolis. A 10th-place finish at Michigan earned Gibbs his first top-10 finish. The following week at Richmond, Gibbs finished 36th, last due to an engine failure. Gibbs finished 26th at Watkins Glen. On August 25, Busch announced he withdrew his request for a playoff waiver.

Six days later, it was announced that Bubba Wallace would swap rides with Gibbs as the No. 45 entry was still eligible for the owner's championship. Wallace finished ninth at Darlington to open the playoffs. He scored his second career win at Kansas. On October 16, Busch announced he would step away from full-time competition in 2023, with the possibility of running the season on a part-time basis. At Las Vegas, Kyle Larson charged aggressively past Kevin Harvick and Wallace, causing Wallace to scrape the outside wall. Wallace retaliated with a right rear hook on Larson, wrecking both cars down the frontstretch and severely damaging Christopher Bell's car in the process. During the caution, Wallace engaged in a shoving match with Larson. Wallace was suspended for one race for the incident; John Hunter Nemechek was assigned to drive the No. 45 at Homestead.

Tyler Reddick (2023–present)

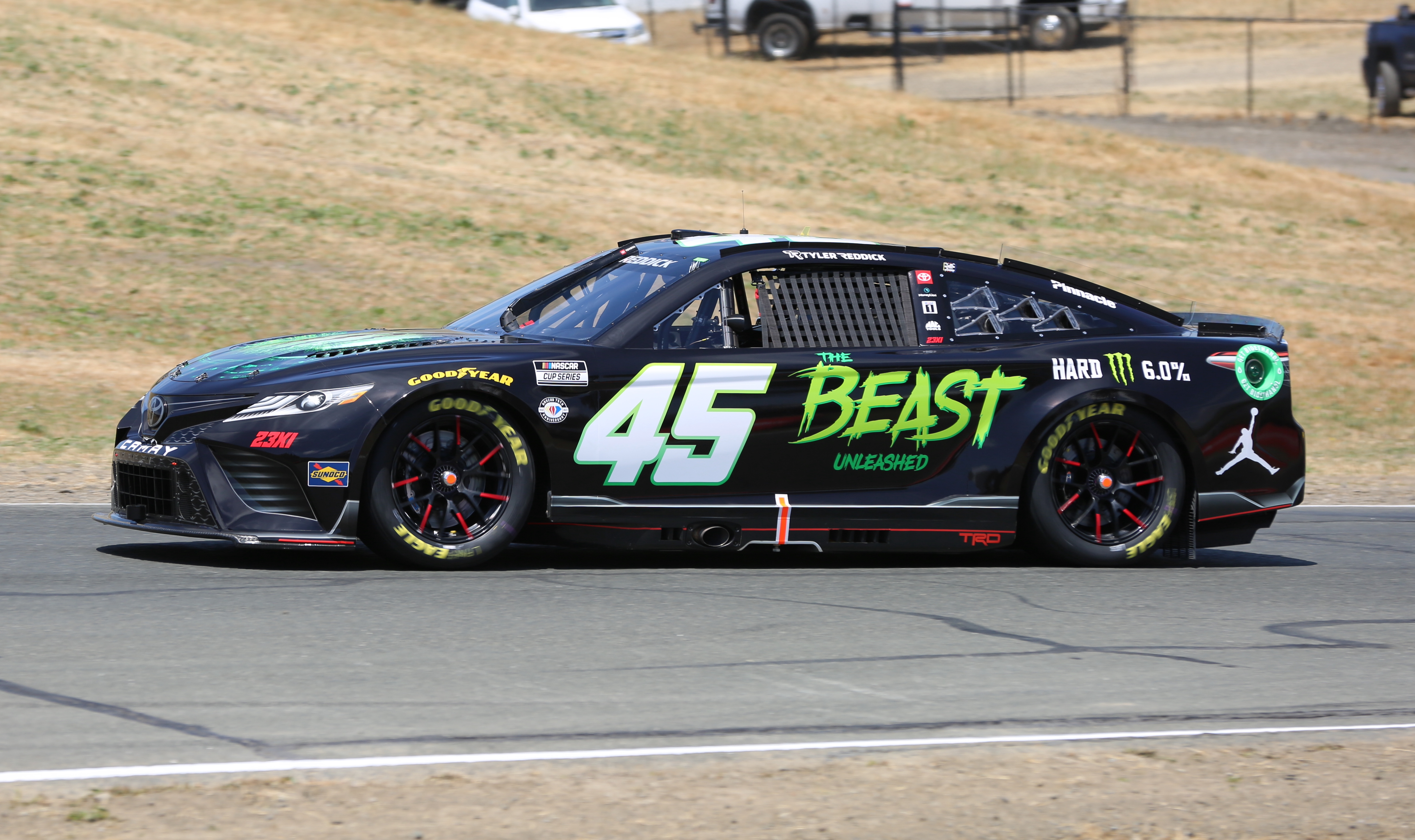
Tyler Reddick in the No. 45 at Sonoma Raceway in 2023.

On October 15, 2022, 23XI Racing announced that it bought out the remainder of Tyler Reddick's contract from Richard Childress Racing to replace Kurt Busch in the No. 45 for the 2023 season. Reddick originally signed with 23XI for 2024, but Busch's concussion and subsequent retirement from full-time competition led to this move.

Reddick started the 2023 season with a 39th place DNF at the 2023 Daytona 500. A month later, he scored his first win of the season at COTA in triple overtime. On May 16, NASCAR docked the No. 45 team ten owner and driver points for unapproved ballasts during inspection prior to qualifying at Darlington. During the playoffs, Reddick won at Kansas to advance to the Round of 12.

Reddick started the 2024 season with a 29th place DNF at the 2024 Daytona 500. He scored his first win of the season at Talladega by overtaking Brad Keselowski on the final stretch after Keselowski spun Michael McDowell and triggered a multi-car crash. He scored his second win of the season at Michigan. Following the Southern 500, Reddick clinched the regular season championship, beating Kyle Larson by just one point. During the playoffs, he locked himself into the Championship 4 by winning at Homestead.

Reddick started the 2025 season with a runner-up finish at the 2025 Daytona 500. Despite having no wins, he stayed consistent enough to make the playoffs until he was eliminated after the Round of 12, finishing ninth in the points standings.

Reddick began the 2026 season by winning the 2026 Daytona 500, as well as Atlanta and COTA, becoming the first driver in Cup Series history to win the first three races in a season. In addition, Reddick won at Darlington and Kansas, becoming the first driver since Dale Earnhardt in 1987 to score five of the first nine races in a season. After having no victories for the rest of the regular season, he won at Phoenix during "The Chase".

==== Car No. 45 results ====
Year	Driver	No.	Make	1	2	3	4	5	6	7	8	9	10	11	12	13	14	15	16	17	18	19	20	21	22	23	24	25	26	27	28	29	30	31	32	33	34	35	36	Owners	Pts
2022	Kurt Busch	45	Toyota	DAY; 19	CAL; 8	LVS; 13	PHO; 5	ATL; 3	COA; 32	RCH; 35	MAR; 6	BRI; 32	TAL; 16	DOV; 31	DAR; 28	KAN; 1*	CLT; 31	GTW; 3	SON; 18	NSH; 2	ROA; 23	ATL; 22	NHA; 10																	10th	2231
2022	Ty Gibbs	45	Toyota																					POC; 16	IND; 17	MCH; 10	RCH; 36	GLN; 26	DAY; 13											10th	2231
2022	Bubba Wallace	45	Toyota																											DAR; 9	KAN; 1	BRI; 29	TEX; 25	TAL; 16	CLT; 7	LVS; 36		MAR; 8	PHO; 22	10th	2231
2022	John Hunter Nemechek	45	Toyota																																		HOM; 27			10th	2231
2023	Tyler Reddick	45	Toyota	DAY; 39	CAL; 34	LVS; 15	PHO; 3	ATL; 5	COA; 1	RCH; 16	BRD; 2	MAR; 22	TAL; 16	DOV; 7	KAN; 9	DAR; 22	CLT; 5	GTW; 35	SON; 33	NSH; 30	CSC; 28	ATL; 27	NHA; 6	POC; 2	RCH; 16	MCH; 30	IRC; 4	GLN; 8	DAY; 25	DAR; 2	KAN; 1	BRI; 15	TEX; 25	TAL; 16	ROV; 6	LVS; 7	HOM; 3	MAR; 26	PHO; 22	6th	2344
2024	Tyler Reddick	45	Toyota	DAY; 29	ATL; 30	LVS; 2	PHO; 10	BRI; 30	COA; 5	RCH; 10	MAR; 7	TEX; 4	TAL; 1	DOV; 11	KAN; 20	DAR; 32*	CLT; 4	GTW; 4	SON; 8*	IOW; 22	NHA; 6	NSH; 3	CSC; 2	POC; 6	IND; 2*	RCH; 3	MCH; 1	DAY; 28	DAR; 10	ATL; 6	GLN; 27	BRI; 20	KAN; 25	TAL; 20	ROV; 11	LVS; 35	HOM; 1*	MAR; 34	PHO; 6	4th	5031
2025	Tyler Reddick	45	Toyota	DAY; 2	ATL; 19	COA; 3	PHO; 20	LVS; 24	HOM; 8	MAR; 14	DAR; 4	BRI; 18	TAL; 14	TEX; 21	KAN; 17	CLT; 26	NSH; 9	MCH; 13	MXC; 20	POC; 32	ATL; 4	CSC; 3	SON; 6	DOV; 12	IND; 29	IOW; 19	GLN; 9	RCH; 34	DAY; 21	DAR; 2	GTW; 16	BRI; 15	NHA; 21	KAN; 7	ROV; 10	LVS; 5	TAL; 7	MAR; 11	PHO; 23	9th	2309
2026	Tyler Reddick	45	Toyota	DAY; 1	ATL; 1*	COA; 1*	PHO; 8	LVS; 13	DAR; 1	MAR; 15	BRI; 4	KAN; 1	TAL; 14	TEX; 4	GLN; 5	CLT; 4	NSH; 6	MCH; 35	POC; 2	COR; 25	SON; 36	CHI; 36	ATL; 8	NWS; 30	IND; 10	IOW; 36	RCH; 11	NHA; 8	DAY; 3	DAR; 3	GTW; 25	BRI; 18	KAN; 11	LVS; 3	CLT; 8	PHO; 1	TAL; 37	MAR; 12	HOM; 2	5th	2397

=== Car No. 50 history ===
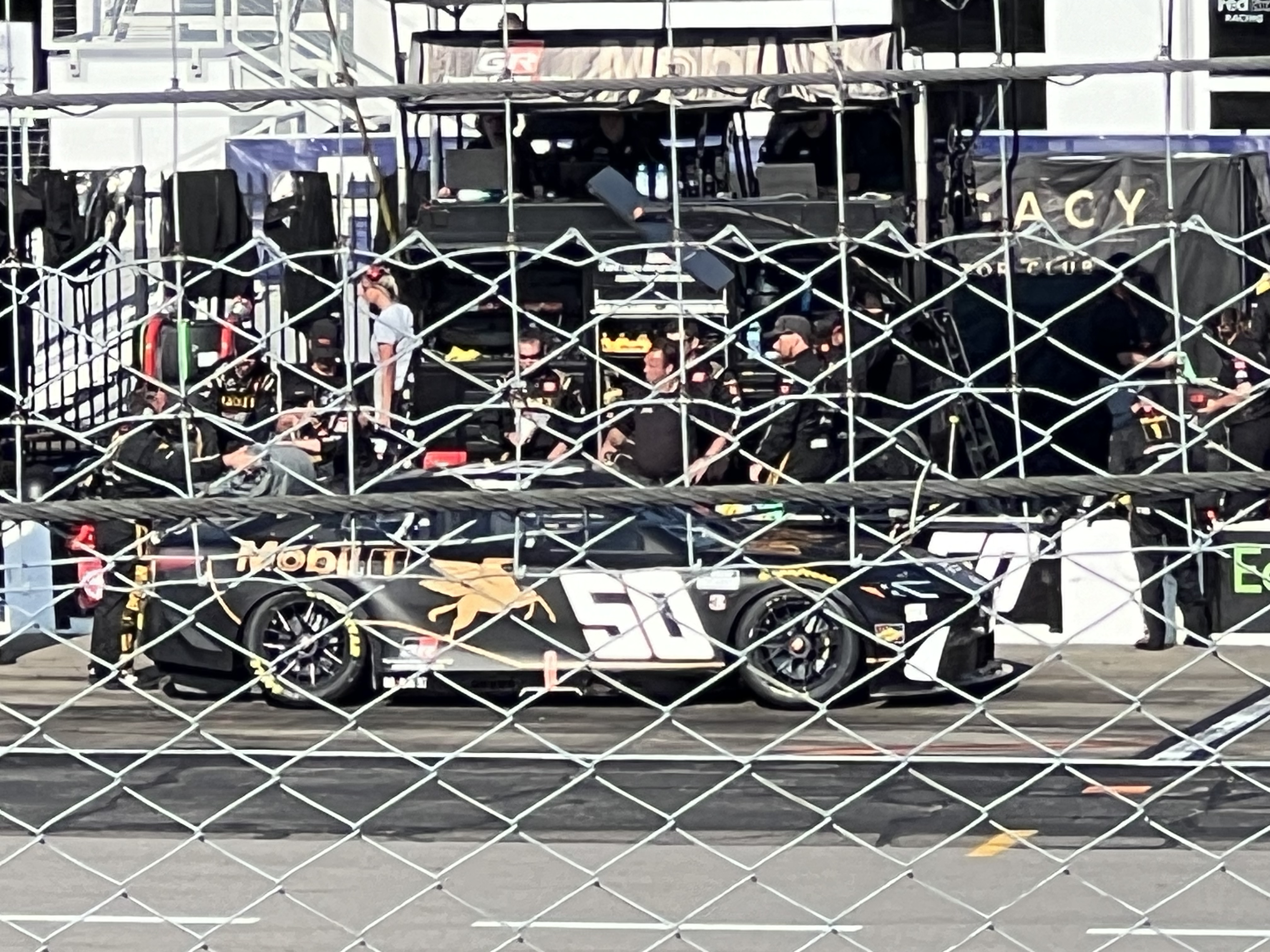
Heim at the 2024 Ally 400.

On March 13, 2024, it was announced that Kobayashi would once again compete in a race for the team, this time at COTA. The car number would race as the No. 50 instead of the No. 67 to celebrate the 50th anniversary of sponsor Mobil 1. The team planned to run the No. 50 for two more races during the season with different drivers.

On May 10, 2024, 23XI Racing announced that Corey Heim would drive the No. 50 Mobil 1 Toyota Camry at Nashville Superspeedway. Heim finished 29th after crashing out in one of five overtimes.

On August 2, 2024, the team announced that Juan Pablo Montoya would make his NASCAR Cup Series return for 23XI at Watkins Glen on September 15. This would be the 3rd and final start for the No. 50 Mobil 1 entry in 2024. Montoya finished 32nd in his return to stock car racing.

==== Car No. 50 results ====
Year	Driver	No.	Make	1	2	3	4	5	6	7	8	9	10	11	12	13	14	15	16	17	18	19	20	21	22	23	24	25	26	27	28	29	30	31	32	33	34	35	36	Owners	Pts
2024	Kamui Kobayashi	50	Toyota	DAY	ATL	LVS	PHO	BRI	COA; 29	RCH	MAR	TEX	TAL	DOV	KAN	DAR	CLT	GTW	SON	IOW	NHA																			45th	21
2024	Corey Heim	50	Toyota																			NSH; 29	CSC	POC	IND	RCH	MCH	DAY	DAR	ATL										45th	21
2024	Juan Pablo Montoya	50	Toyota																												GLN; 32	BRI	KAN	TAL	ROV	LVS	HOM	MAR	PHO	45th	21

=== Car No. 67 history ===
Part-time (2023)

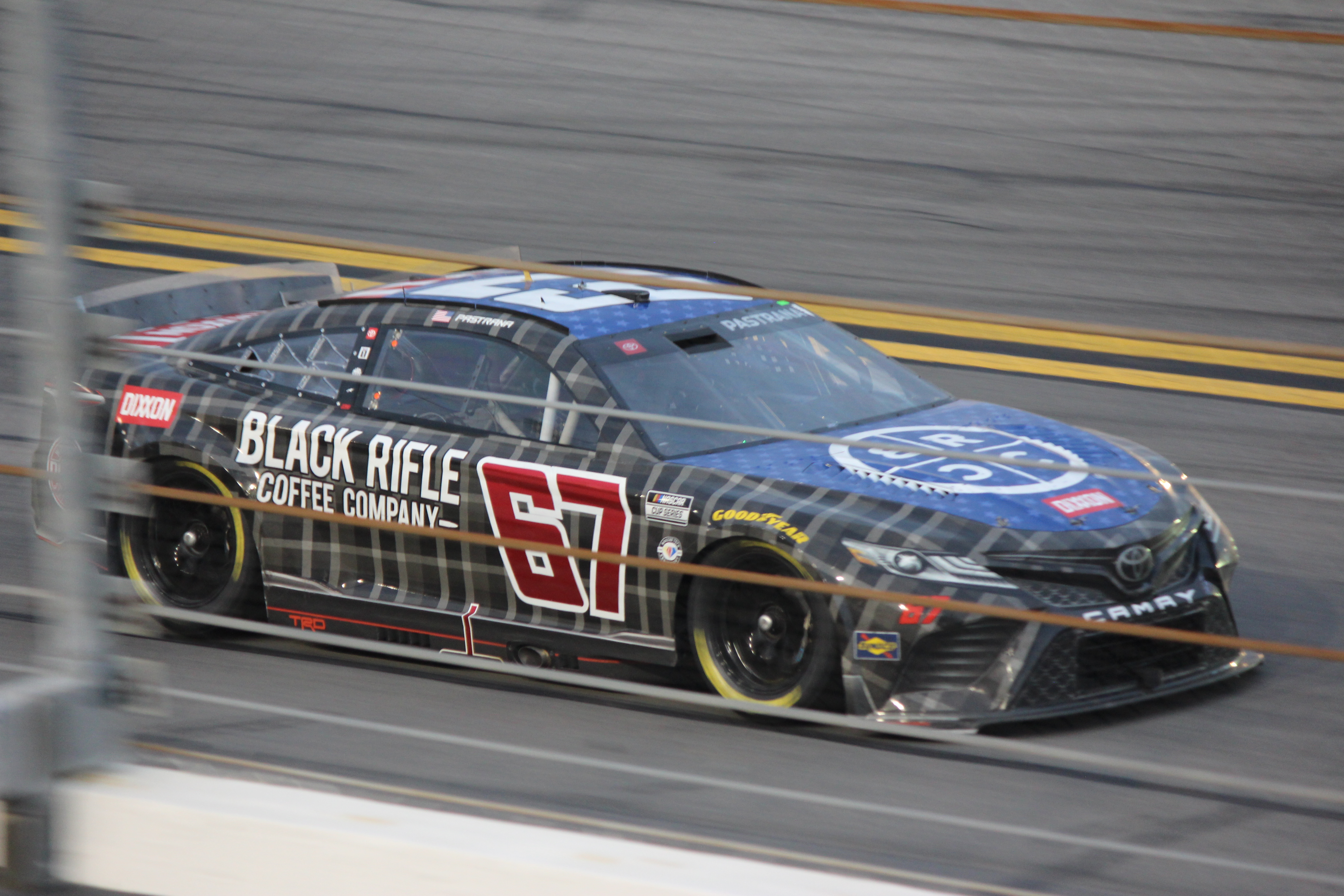
Pastrana at the Daytona 500

On January 17, 2023, 23XI announced that Travis Pastrana would attempt to enter the No. 67 Toyota Camry for the 2023 Daytona 500 with sponsorship coming from Black Rifle Coffee Company. On February 14, Pastrana made the entry field by scoring the second fastest lap among the non-chartered teams. He suffered an accident in the qualifying duel and started in the back for the race. Pastrana ended up finishing eleventh in the race. On June 7, it was announced that Kamui Kobayashi would make his Cup debut in the No. 67 at the Indianapolis Motor Speedway Road Course, he would end up finishing 33rd in the race after getting caught up in several wrecks.

Corey Heim (2025-present)

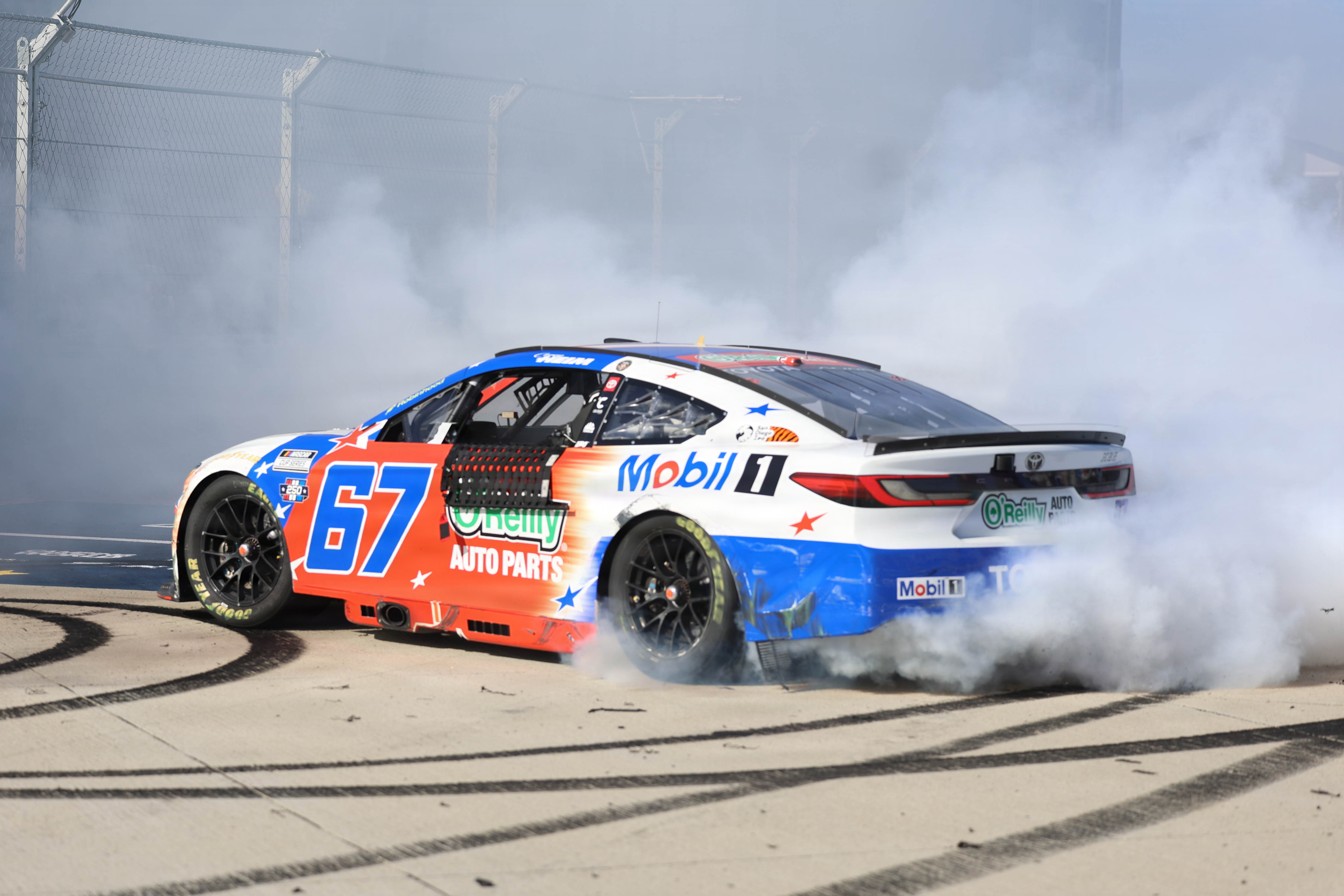
Corey Heim performing a burnout after winning the 2026 Anduril 250

On February 23, 2025, 23XI announced that Corey Heim signed a developmental deal that includes Cup races in the No. 67, and Xfinity races in the Sam Hunt Racing No. 24 car.

During the 2026 season, Heim scored his first career win at Naval Base Coronado. A month later, he scored his second win at Indianapolis.

On November 17, 2026, Corey Heim and 23XI announced Heim would be staying in the No. 67 car moving forward, in a corresponding move 23XI will be dropping the No. 35 for the 2027 season.

==== Car No. 67 results ====
Year	Driver	No.	Make	1	2	3	4	5	6	7	8	9	10	11	12	13	14	15	16	17	18	19	20	21	22	23	24	25	26	27	28	29	30	31	32	33	34	35	36	Owners	Pts
2023	Travis Pastrana	67	Toyota	DAY; 11	CAL	LVS	PHO	ATL	COA	RCH	BRD	MAR	TAL	DOV	KAN	DAR	CLT	GTW	SON	NSH	CSC	ATL	NHA	POC	RCH	MCH														41st	30
2023	Kamui Kobayashi	67	Toyota																								IRC; 33	GLN	DAY	DAR	KAN	BRI	TEX	TAL	ROV	LVS	HOM	MAR	PHO	41st	30
2025	Corey Heim	67	Toyota	DAY	ATL	COA	PHO	LVS	HOM	MAR	DAR	BRI	TAL	TEX	KAN; 13	CLT	NSH; 37	MCH	MXC	POC	ATL	CSC; DNQ	SON	DOV	IND	IOW	GLN	RCH; 29	DAY	DAR	GTW	BRI; 6	NHA	KAN	ROV	LVS	TAL	MAR	PHO	40th	64
2026	Corey Heim	67	Toyota	DAY; 28	ATL	COA	PHO	LVS	DAR	MAR	BRI	KAN; 15	TAL	TEX; 31	GLN	CLT; 19	NSH; 25	MCH	POC	COR; 1	SON	CHI; 9	ATL	NWS	IND; 1*	IOW	RCH	NHA	DAY; 16	DAR; 19	GTW	BRI	KAN	LVS	CLT; 11	PHO; 5	TAL	MAR	HOM; 40	36th	330
