= 2026 Enjoy Illinois 300 =

NASCAR Cup Series race

Race details
- Race 28 of 36 in the 2026 NASCAR Cup Series
- Date: September 13, 2026
- Location: Gateway Motorsports Park in Madison, Illinois
- Course: Permanent racing facility
- Course length: 1.25 miles (2.01 km)
- Distance: 247 laps, 308.75 mi (496.47 km)
- Scheduled distance: 240 laps, 300 mi (480 km)
- Average speed: 81.47 miles per hour (131.11 km/h)

Pole position
Driver	Joey Logano	Team Penske
- Time: 32.817

Most laps led
Driver	Joey Logano	Team Penske
- Laps: 96

Fastest lap
Driver	Joey Logano	Team Penske
- Time: 33.286

Winner
No. 5	Kyle Larson	Hendrick Motorsports

Television in the United States
- Network: USA
- Announcers: Leigh Diffey, Jeff Burton and Steve Letarte

Radio in the United States
- Radio: MRN
- Booth announcers: Kyle Rickey and Brad Gillie
- Turn announcers: Tim Catafalmo (1 & 2) and Nathan Prouty (3 & 4)

The 2026 Enjoy Illinois 300 was a NASCAR Cup Series race held on September 13, 2026, at World Wide Technology Raceway in Madison, Illinois. Contested over 247 laps on the 1.25-mile (2.01 km) egg-shaped asphalt oval, extended from the original 240 laps due to a double-overtime finish, it was the 28th race of the 2026 NASCAR Cup Series season, and the second race of the NASCAR Chase.

Kyle Larson won the race. Alex Bowman finished 2nd, and Joey Logano finished 3rd. William Byron and Ross Chastain rounded out the top five, and Austin Dillon, Connor Zilisch, Carson Hocevar, Denny Hamlin, and Austin Cindric rounded out the top ten.

== Report ==
=== Background ===
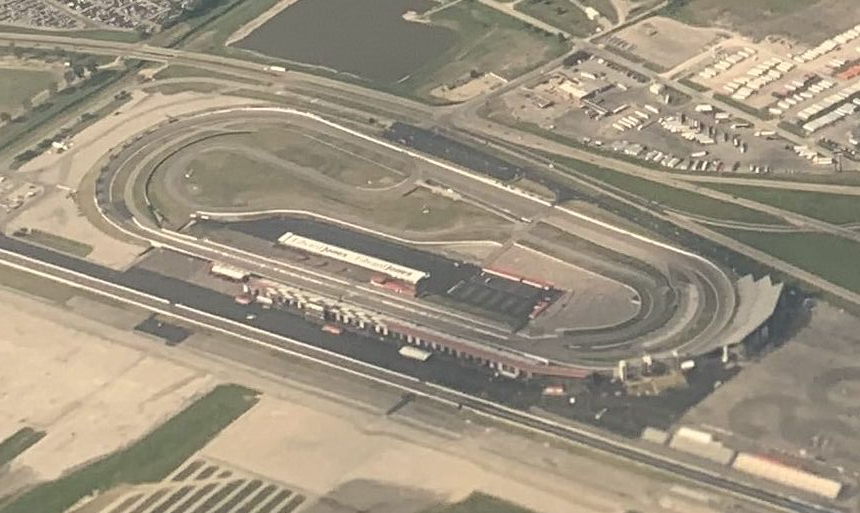
World Wide Technology Raceway, the track where the race was held.

World Wide Technology Raceway (formerly Gateway International Raceway and Gateway Motorsports Park) is a motorsport racing facility in Madison, Illinois, just east of St. Louis, Missouri, United States, close to the Gateway Arch. It features a 1.25-mile (2 kilometer) oval that hosts the NASCAR Cup Series, NASCAR Craftsman Truck Series, and the NTT IndyCar Series, a 1.6-mile (2.6 km) infield road course used by the SCCA, Porsche Club of America, and various car clubs, and a quarter-mile drag strip that hosts the annual NHRA Midwest Nationals event.

During the offseason, NASCAR announced that Gateway would now get the short track package, as opposed to running the intermediate package from previous years.

==== Entry list ====
- (R) denotes rookie driver.
- (i) denotes driver who is ineligible for series driver points.
- (CC) denotes chase contender.

No.	Driver	Team	Manufacturer
1	Ross Chastain	Trackhouse Racing	Chevrolet
2	Austin Cindric (CC)	Team Penske	Ford
3	Austin Dillon	Richard Childress Racing	Chevrolet
4	Noah Gragson	Front Row Motorsports	Ford
5	Kyle Larson (CC)	Hendrick Motorsports	Chevrolet
6	Brad Keselowski	RFK Racing	Ford
7	Daniel Suárez (CC)	Spire Motorsports	Chevrolet
9	Chase Elliott (CC)	Hendrick Motorsports	Chevrolet
10	Ty Dillon	Kaulig Racing	Chevrolet
11	Denny Hamlin (CC)	Joe Gibbs Racing	Toyota
12	Ryan Blaney (CC)	Team Penske	Ford
16	A. J. Allmendinger	Kaulig Racing	Chevrolet
17	Chris Buescher (CC)	RFK Racing	Ford
19	Chase Briscoe (CC)	Joe Gibbs Racing	Toyota
20	Christopher Bell (CC)	Joe Gibbs Racing	Toyota
21	Josh Berry	Wood Brothers Racing	Ford
22	Joey Logano (CC)	Team Penske	Ford
23	Bubba Wallace (CC)	23XI Racing	Toyota
24	William Byron (CC)	Hendrick Motorsports	Chevrolet
33	Austin Hill (i)	Richard Childress Racing	Chevrolet
34	Todd Gilliland	Front Row Motorsports	Ford
35	Riley Herbst	23XI Racing	Toyota
38	Zane Smith	Front Row Motorsports	Ford
41	Cole Custer	Haas Factory Team	Ford
42	John Hunter Nemechek	Legacy Motor Club	Toyota
43	Erik Jones	Legacy Motor Club	Toyota
45	Tyler Reddick (CC)	23XI Racing	Toyota
47	Ricky Stenhouse Jr.	Hyak Motorsports	Chevrolet
48	Alex Bowman	Hendrick Motorsports	Chevrolet
51	Cody Ware	Rick Ware Racing	Chevrolet
54	Ty Gibbs	Joe Gibbs Racing	Toyota
60	Ryan Preece (CC)	RFK Racing	Ford
71	Michael McDowell	Spire Motorsports	Chevrolet
77	Carson Hocevar (CC)	Spire Motorsports	Chevrolet
88	Connor Zilisch (R)	Trackhouse Racing	Chevrolet
97	Shane van Gisbergen	Trackhouse Racing	Chevrolet
Official entry list

== Practice ==
Ryan Blaney was the fastest in the practice session, with a time of 33.170 seconds and a speed of 135.665 mph (218.332 km/h).

=== Practice results ===
Pos	No.	Driver	Team	Manufacturer	Time	Speed
1	12	Ryan Blaney (CC)	Team Penske	Ford	33.170	135.665
2	22	Joey Logano (CC)	Team Penske	Ford	33.207	135.514
3	21	Josh Berry	Wood Brothers Racing	Ford	33.210	135.501
Official practice results

== Qualifying ==
Joey Logano scored the pole for the race with a time of 32.817 and a speed of 137.124 mph (220.680 km/h).

=== Qualifying results ===
Pos	No.	Driver	Team	Manufacturer	Time	Speed
1	22	Joey Logano (CC)	Team Penske	Ford	32.817	137.124
2	5	Kyle Larson (CC)	Hendrick Motorsports	Chevrolet	33.093	135.980
3	12	Ryan Blaney (CC)	Team Penske	Ford	33.113	135.898
4	20	Christopher Bell (CC)	Joe Gibbs Racing	Toyota	33.145	135.767
5	19	Chase Briscoe (CC)	Joe Gibbs Racing	Toyota	33.199	135.546
6	77	Carson Hocevar (CC)	Spire Motorsports	Chevrolet	33.236	135.395
7	23	Bubba Wallace (CC)	23XI Racing	Toyota	33.246	135.355
8	9	Chase Elliott (CC)	Hendrick Motorsports	Chevrolet	33.259	135.302
9	54	Ty Gibbs (CC)	Joe Gibbs Racing	Toyota	33.261	135.294
10	11	Denny Hamlin (CC)	Joe Gibbs Racing	Toyota	33.312	135.086
11	48	Alex Bowman	Hendrick Motorsports	Chevrolet	33.407	134.702
12	38	Zane Smith	Front Row Motorsports	Ford	33.420	134.650
13	2	Austin Cindric (CC)	Team Penske	Ford	33.441	134.565
14	60	Ryan Preece (CC)	RFK Racing	Ford	33.487	134.381
15	7	Daniel Suárez (CC)	Spire Motorsports	Chevrolet	33.492	134.360
16	21	Josh Berry	Wood Brothers Racing	Ford	33.503	134.316
17	16	A. J. Allmendinger	Kaulig Racing	Chevrolet	33.492	134.360
18	45	Tyler Reddick (CC)	23XI Racing	Toyota	33.557	134.100
19	88	Connor Zilisch (R)	Trackhouse Racing	Chevrolet	33.572	134.040
20	1	Ross Chastain	Trackhouse Racing	Chevrolet	33.583	133.996
21	17	Chris Buescher (CC)	RFK Racing	Ford	33.607	133.901
22	3	Austin Dillon	Richard Childress Racing	Chevrolet	33.624	133.833
23	6	Brad Keselowski	RFK Racing	Ford	33.689	133.575
24	24	William Byron (CC)	Hendrick Motorsports	Chevrolet	33.700	133.531
25	43	Erik Jones	Legacy Motor Club	Toyota	33.713	133.480
26	41	Cole Custer	Haas Factory Team	Chevrolet	33.725	133.432
27	33	Austin Hill (i)	Richard Childress Racing	Chevrolet	33.768	133.262
28	42	John Hunter Nemechek	Legacy Motor Club	Toyota	33.810	133.097
29	71	Michael McDowell	Spire Motorsports	Chevrolet	33.878	132.830
30	51	Cody Ware	Rick Ware Racing	Chevrolet	33.926	132.642
31	4	Noah Gragson	Front Row Motorsports	Ford	33.934	132.610
32	10	Ty Dillon	Kaulig Racing	Chevrolet	33.943	132.575
33	35	Riley Herbst	23XI Racing	Toyota	34.062	132.112
34	34	Todd Gilliland	Front Row Motorsports	Ford	34.065	132.100
35	97	Shane van Gisbergen	Trackhouse Racing	Chevrolet	34.186	131.633
36	47	Ricky Stenhouse Jr.	Hyak Motorsports	Chevrolet	34.215	131.521
Official qualifying results

== Race ==
=== Race results ===
==== Stage results ====
Stage One Laps: 45

Pos	No	Driver	Team	Manufacturer	Points
1	22	Joey Logano (CC)	Team Penske	Ford	10
2	20	Christopher Bell (CC)	Joe Gibbs Racing	Toyota	9
3	5	Kyle Larson (CC)	Hendrick Motorsports	Chevrolet	8
4	12	Ryan Blaney (CC)	Team Penske	Ford	7
5	9	Chase Elliott (CC)	Hendrick Motorsports	Chevrolet	6
6	77	Carson Hocevar (CC)	Spire Motorsports	Chevrolet	5
7	19	Chase Briscoe (CC)	Joe Gibbs Racing	Toyota	4
8	48	Alex Bowman	Hendrick Motorsports	Chevrolet	3
9	54	Ty Gibbs (CC)	Joe Gibbs Racing	Toyota	2
10	6	Brad Keselowski	RFK Racing	Ford	1

Stage Two Laps: 86

Pos	No	Driver	Team	Manufacturer	Points
1	5	Kyle Larson (CC)	Hendrick Motorsports	Chevrolet	10
2	22	Joey Logano (CC)	Team Penske	Ford	9
3	6	Brad Keselowski	RFK Racing	Ford	8
4	12	Ryan Blaney (CC)	Team Penske	Ford	7
5	21	Josh Berry	Wood Brothers Racing	Ford	6
6	11	Denny Hamlin (CC)	Joe Gibbs Racing	Toyota	5
7	60	Ryan Preece (CC)	RFK Racing	Ford	4
8	45	Tyler Reddick (CC)	23XI Racing	Toyota	3
9	19	Chase Briscoe (CC)	Joe Gibbs Racing	Toyota	2
10	23	Bubba Wallace (CC)	23XI Racing	Toyota	1

=== Final Stage results ===
Stage Three Laps: 109

Pos	Grid	No	Driver	Team	Manufacturer	Laps	Points
1	2	5	Kyle Larson (CC)	Hendrick Motorsports	Chevrolet	247	73
2	11	48	Alex Bowman	Hendrick Motorsports	Chevrolet	247	38
3	1	22	Joey Logano (CC)	Team Penske	Ford	247	54
4	24	24	William Byron (CC)	Hendrick Motorsports	Chevrolet	247	33
5	20	1	Ross Chastain	Trackhouse Racing	Chevrolet	247	32
6	22	3	Austin Dillon	Richard Childress Racing	Chevrolet	247	31
7	19	88	Connor Zilisch (R)	Trackhouse Racing	Chevrolet	247	30
8	6	77	Carson Hocevar (CC)	Spire Motorsports	Chevrolet	247	34
9	10	11	Denny Hamlin (CC)	Joe Gibbs Racing	Toyota	247	33
10	13	2	Austin Cindric (CC)	Team Penske	Ford	247	27
11	26	41	Cole Custer	Haas Factory Team	Chevrolet	247	26
12	23	6	Brad Keselowski	RFK Racing	Ford	247	34
13	25	43	Erik Jones	Legacy Motor Club	Toyota	247	24
14	7	23	Bubba Wallace (CC)	23XI Racing	Toyota	247	24
15	28	42	John Hunter Nemechek	Legacy Motor Club	Toyota	247	22
16	17	16	A. J. Allmendinger	Kaulig Racing	Chevrolet	247	21
17	14	60	Ryan Preece (CC)	RFK Racing	Ford	247	24
18	9	54	Ty Gibbs (CC)	Joe Gibbs Racing	Toyota	247	21
19	4	20	Christopher Bell (CC)	Joe Gibbs Racing	Toyota	247	27
20	29	71	Michael McDowell	Spire Motorsports	Chevrolet	247	17
21	27	33	Austin Hill (i)	Richard Childress Racing	Chevrolet	247	0
22	30	51	Cody Ware	Rick Ware Racing	Chevrolet	247	15
23	35	97	Shane van Gisbergen	Trackhouse Racing	Chevrolet	247	14
24	34	34	Todd Gilliland	Front Row Motorsports	Ford	247	13
25	18	45	Tyler Reddick (CC)	23XI Racing	Toyota	247	15
26	36	47	Ricky Stenhouse Jr.	Hyak Motorsports	Chevrolet	247	11
27	21	17	Chris Buescher (CC)	RFK Racing	Ford	238	10
28	16	21	Josh Berry	Wood Brothers Racing	Ford	231	15
29	15	7	Daniel Suárez (CC)	Spire Motorsports	Chevrolet	229	8
30	32	10	Ty Dillon	Kaulig Racing	Chevrolet	227	7
31	8	9	Chase Elliott (CC)	Hendrick Motorsports	Chevrolet	215	12
32	5	19	Chase Briscoe (CC)	Joe Gibbs Racing	Toyota	213	11
33	31	4	Noah Gragson	Front Row Motorsports	Ford	198	4
34	33	35	Riley Herbst	23XI Racing	Toyota	176	3
35	3	12	Ryan Blaney (CC)	Team Penske	Ford	155	16
36	12	38	Zane Smith	Front Row Motorsports	Ford	130	1
Official race results

=== Race statistics ===
- Lead changes: 11 among 5 different drivers
- Cautions/Laps: 18 for 87
- Red flags: 2 for 8 minutes and 4 seconds
- Time of race: 3 hours, 47 minutes, and 23 seconds
- Average speed: 81.47 miles per hour (131.11 km/h)

== Media ==
=== Television ===
USA Sports covered the race on the television side. Leigh Diffey, Jeff Burton and Steve Letarte called the race from the broadcast booth. Dave Burns, Kim Coon, and Marty Snider handled pit road, while Trevor Bayne provided analysis from the pace car for the television side.

USA
Booth announcers	Pit reporters	Pace car
Lap-by-lap: Leigh Diffey; Color-commentator: Jeff Burton; Color-commentator: Steve Letarte	Dave Burns; Kim Coon; Marty Snider	Trevor Bayne

=== Radio ===
MRN had the radio call for the race, which was also simulcast on Sirius XM NASCAR Radio. Kyle Rickey & PRN Radio's Brad Gillie called the action for MRN when the field races thru the front straightaway. Tim Catafalmo called the action for MRN from atop the Sunoco tower outside the exit of turn 2 when the field races thru turns 1 & 2. Nathan Prouty worked the action for MRN when the field races thru turns 3 & 4. Pit road was operated by lead pit reporter Steve Post, Brienne Pedigo, and Jason Toy.

MRN
Booth announcers	Turn announcers	Pit reporters
Lead announcer: Brad Gillie; Announcer: Kyle Rickey	Turns 1 & 2: Tim Catafalmo; Turns 3 & 4: Nathan Prouty	Steve Post; Brienne Pedigo; Jason Toy

== Standings after the race ==
Drivers' Championship standings

	Pos	Driver	Points
	1	Denny Hamlin	2,168
5	2	Kyle Larson	2,159 (–9)
1	3	Christopher Bell	2,150 (–18)
1	4	Ryan Blaney	2,135 (–33)
1	5	Tyler Reddick	2,126 (–42)
2	6	Joey Logano	2,117 (–51)
1	7	Ty Gibbs	2,117 (–51)
3	8	Chase Briscoe	2,109 (–59)
3	9	Carson Hocevar	2,080 (–88)
	10	Bubba Wallace	2,078 (–90)
2	11	Chase Elliott	2,075 (–93)
2	12	Austin Cindric	2,060 (–108)
2	13	Chris Buescher	2,057 (–111)
1	14	Ryan Preece	2,055 (–113)
1	15	William Byron	2,054 (–114)
3	16	Daniel Suárez	2,049 (–119)
Official driver's standings

Manufacturers' Championship standings

Pos	Manufacturer	Points
1	Toyota	1,257
2	Chevrolet	1,082 (–175)
3	Ford	1,032 (–225)

- Note: Only the first 16 positions are included for the driver standings.

Previous race: 2026 Cook Out Southern 500	NASCAR Cup Series; 2026 season	Next race: 2026 Bass Pro Shops Night Race
