= 2022 Quaker State 400 =

NASCAR Cup Series race

Race details
- Race 19 of 36 in the 2022 NASCAR Cup Series
- Date: July 10, 2022
- Location: Atlanta Motor Speedway in Hampton, Georgia
- Course: Permanent racing facility
- Course length: 1.54 miles (2.48 km)
- Distance: 260 laps, 400.4 mi (644.244 km)
- Average speed: 118.754 miles per hour (191.116 km/h)

Pole position
Driver	Chase Elliott	Hendrick Motorsports
- Time: N/A

Most laps led
Driver	Chase Elliott	Hendrick Motorsports
- Laps: 97

Winner
No. 9	Chase Elliott	Hendrick Motorsports

Television in the United States
- Network: USA
- Announcers: Rick Allen, Jeff Burton, Steve Letarte, and Dale Earnhardt Jr.

Radio in the United States
- Radio: PRN
- Booth announcers: Doug Rice and Mark Garrow
- Turn announcers: Doug Turnbull (1 & 2) and Pat Patterson (3 & 4)

The 2022 Quaker State 400 was a NASCAR Cup Series race held on July 10, 2022, at Atlanta Motor Speedway in Hampton, Georgia. Contested over 260 laps on the 1.54-mile-long (2.48 km) asphalt quad-oval intermediate speedway (with superspeedway rules), it was the 19th race of the 2022 NASCAR Cup Series season.

== Report ==
=== Background ===
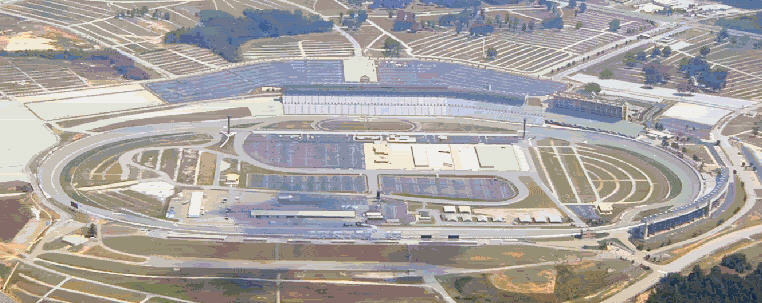
Atlanta Motor Speedway, the track where the race was held.

Atlanta Motor Speedway is a track in Hampton, Georgia, 20 miles (32 km) south of Atlanta. It is a 1.54-mile (2.48 km) quad-oval track with a seating capacity of 111,000. It opened in 1960 as a 1.5-mile (2.4 km) standard oval. In 1994, 46 condominiums were built over the northeastern side of the track. In 1997, to standardize the track with Speedway Motorsports' other two 1.5-mile (2.4 km) ovals, the entire track was almost completely rebuilt. The frontstretch and backstretch were swapped, and the configuration of the track was changed from oval to quad-oval. The project made the track one of the fastest on the NASCAR circuit.

==== Entry list ====
- (R) denotes rookie driver.
- (i) denotes driver who is ineligible for series driver points.

No.	Driver	Team	Manufacturer
1	Ross Chastain	Trackhouse Racing Team	Chevrolet
2	Austin Cindric (R)	Team Penske	Ford
3	Austin Dillon	Richard Childress Racing	Chevrolet
4	Kevin Harvick	Stewart-Haas Racing	Ford
5	Kyle Larson	Hendrick Motorsports	Chevrolet
6	Brad Keselowski	RFK Racing	Ford
7	Corey LaJoie	Spire Motorsports	Chevrolet
8	Tyler Reddick	Richard Childress Racing	Chevrolet
9	Chase Elliott	Hendrick Motorsports	Chevrolet
10	Aric Almirola	Stewart-Haas Racing	Ford
11	Denny Hamlin	Joe Gibbs Racing	Toyota
12	Ryan Blaney	Team Penske	Ford
14	Chase Briscoe	Stewart-Haas Racing	Ford
15	Garrett Smithley (i)	Rick Ware Racing	Ford
16	Noah Gragson (i)	Kaulig Racing	Chevrolet
17	Chris Buescher	RFK Racing	Ford
18	Kyle Busch	Joe Gibbs Racing	Toyota
19	Martin Truex Jr.	Joe Gibbs Racing	Toyota
20	Christopher Bell	Joe Gibbs Racing	Toyota
21	Harrison Burton (R)	Wood Brothers Racing	Ford
22	Joey Logano	Team Penske	Ford
23	Bubba Wallace	23XI Racing	Toyota
24	William Byron	Hendrick Motorsports	Chevrolet
31	Justin Haley	Kaulig Racing	Chevrolet
34	Michael McDowell	Front Row Motorsports	Ford
38	Todd Gilliland (R)	Front Row Motorsports	Ford
41	Cole Custer	Stewart-Haas Racing	Ford
42	Ty Dillon	Petty GMS Motorsports	Chevrolet
43	Erik Jones	Petty GMS Motorsports	Chevrolet
45	Kurt Busch	23XI Racing	Toyota
47	Ricky Stenhouse Jr.	JTG Daugherty Racing	Chevrolet
48	Alex Bowman	Hendrick Motorsports	Chevrolet
51	Cody Ware	Rick Ware Racing	Ford
77	Landon Cassill (i)	Spire Motorsports	Chevrolet
78	B. J. McLeod (i)	Live Fast Motorsports	Ford
99	Daniel Suárez	Trackhouse Racing Team	Chevrolet
Official entry list

== Rule Change ==
On June 14, Bob Pockrass reported NASCAR will use the superspeedway format for Atlanta, with no practice session. Teams will qualify after inspection.

== Qualifying ==
Qualifying for Saturday was cancelled due to rain and Chase Elliott, the point leader, was awarded the pole as a result.

=== Starting lineup ===
Pos	No.	Driver	Team	Manufacturer
1	9	Chase Elliott	Hendrick Motorsports	Chevrolet
2	1	Ross Chastain	Trackhouse Racing Team	Chevrolet
3	5	Kyle Larson	Hendrick Motorsports	Chevrolet
4	8	Tyler Reddick	Richard Childress Racing	Chevrolet
5	2	Austin Cindric (R)	Team Penske	Ford
6	12	Ryan Blaney	Team Penske	Ford
7	99	Daniel Suárez	Trackhouse Racing Team	Chevrolet
8	48	Alex Bowman	Hendrick Motorsports	Chevrolet
9	19	Martin Truex Jr.	Joe Gibbs Racing	Toyota
10	4	Kevin Harvick	Stewart-Haas Racing	Ford
11	17	Chris Buescher	RFK Racing	Ford
12	34	Michael McDowell	Front Row Motorsports	Ford
13	24	William Byron	Hendrick Motorsports	Chevrolet
14	14	Chase Briscoe	Stewart-Haas Racing	Ford
15	20	Christopher Bell	Joe Gibbs Racing	Toyota
16	11	Denny Hamlin	Joe Gibbs Racing	Toyota
17	22	Joey Logano	Team Penske	Ford
18	41	Cole Custer	Stewart-Haas Racing	Ford
19	18	Kyle Busch	Joe Gibbs Racing	Toyota
20	47	Ricky Stenhouse Jr.	JTG Daugherty Racing	Chevrolet
21	45	Kurt Busch	23XI Racing	Toyota
22	10	Aric Almirola	Stewart-Haas Racing	Ford
23	42	Ty Dillon	Petty GMS Motorsports	Chevrolet
24	31	Justin Haley	Kaulig Racing	Chevrolet
25	43	Erik Jones	Petty GMS Motorsports	Chevrolet
26	3	Austin Dillon	Richard Childress Racing	Chevrolet
27	21	Harrison Burton (R)	Wood Brothers Racing	Ford
28	38	Todd Gilliland (R)	Front Row Motorsports	Ford
29	16	Noah Gragson (i)	Kaulig Racing	Chevrolet
30	7	Corey LaJoie	Spire Motorsports	Chevrolet
31	6	Brad Keselowski	RFK Racing	Ford
32	23	Bubba Wallace	23XI Racing	Toyota
33	15	Garrett Smithley (i)	Rick Ware Racing	Ford
34	51	Cody Ware	Rick Ware Racing	Ford
35	78	B. J. McLeod (i)	Live Fast Motorsports	Ford
36	77	Landon Cassill (i)	Spire Motorsports	Chevrolet
Official starting lineup

== Race ==
=== Stage Results ===
Stage One Laps: 60

Pos	No	Driver	Team	Manufacturer	Points
1	9	Chase Elliott	Hendrick Motorsports	Chevrolet	10
2	48	Alex Bowman	Hendrick Motorsports	Chevrolet	9
3	1	Ross Chastain	Trackhouse Racing Team	Chevrolet	8
4	12	Ryan Blaney	Team Penske	Ford	7
5	24	William Byron	Hendrick Motorsports	Chevrolet	6
6	18	Kyle Busch	Joe Gibbs Racing	Toyota	5
7	45	Kurt Busch	23XI Racing	Toyota	4
8	11	Denny Hamlin	Joe Gibbs Racing	Toyota	3
9	5	Kyle Larson	Hendrick Motorsports	Chevrolet	2
10	20	Christopher Bell	Joe Gibbs Racing	Toyota	1
Official stage one results

Stage Two Laps: 100

Pos	No	Driver	Team	Manufacturer	Points
1	9	Chase Elliott	Hendrick Motorsports	Chevrolet	10
2	8	Tyler Reddick	Richard Childress Racing	Chevrolet	9
3	6	Brad Keselowski	RFK Racing	Ford	8
4	12	Ryan Blaney	Team Penske	Ford	7
5	45	Kurt Busch	23XI Racing	Toyota	6
6	20	Christopher Bell	Joe Gibbs Racing	Toyota	5
7	21	Harrison Burton (R)	Wood Brothers Racing	Ford	4
8	24	William Byron	Hendrick Motorsports	Chevrolet	3
9	1	Ross Chastain	Trackhouse Racing Team	Chevrolet	2
10	7	Corey LaJoie	Spire Motorsports	Chevrolet	1
Official stage two results

=== Final Stage Results ===
Stage Three Laps: 100

Pos	Grid	No	Driver	Team	Manufacturer	Laps	Points
1	1	9	Chase Elliott	Hendrick Motorsports	Chevrolet	260	60
2	2	1	Ross Chastain	Trackhouse Racing Team	Chevrolet	260	45
3	5	2	Austin Cindric (R)	Team Penske	Ford	260	34
4	25	43	Erik Jones	Petty GMS Motorsports	Chevrolet	260	33
5	6	12	Ryan Blaney	Team Penske	Ford	260	46
6	7	99	Daniel Suárez	Trackhouse Racing Team	Chevrolet	260	31
7	24	31	Justin Haley	Kaulig Racing	Chevrolet	260	30
8	22	10	Aric Almirola	Stewart-Haas Racing	Ford	260	29
9	18	41	Cole Custer	Stewart-Haas Racing	Ford	260	28
10	27	21	Harrison Burton (R)	Wood Brothers Racing	Ford	260	31
11	9	19	Martin Truex Jr.	Joe Gibbs Racing	Toyota	260	26
12	10	4	Kevin Harvick	Stewart-Haas Racing	Ford	260	25
13	3	5	Kyle Larson	Hendrick Motorsports	Chevrolet	260	26
14	32	23	Bubba Wallace	23XI Racing	Toyota	260	23
15	12	34	Michael McDowell	Front Row Motorsports	Ford	260	22
16	14	14	Chase Briscoe	Stewart-Haas Racing	Ford	260	21
17	28	38	Todd Gilliland (R)	Front Row Motorsports	Ford	260	20
18	31	6	Brad Keselowski	RFK Racing	Ford	260	27
19	15	20	Christopher Bell	Joe Gibbs Racing	Toyota	260	24
20	19	18	Kyle Busch	Joe Gibbs Racing	Toyota	260	22
21	30	7	Corey LaJoie	Spire Motorsports	Chevrolet	260	17
22	21	45	Kurt Busch	23XI Racing	Toyota	259	25
23	34	51	Cody Ware	Rick Ware Racing	Ford	259	14
24	36	77	Landon Cassill (i)	Spire Motorsports	Chevrolet	259	0
25	16	11	Denny Hamlin	Joe Gibbs Racing	Toyota	259	15
26	17	22	Joey Logano	Team Penske	Ford	252	11
27	33	15	Garrett Smithley (i)	Rick Ware Racing	Ford	252	0
28	23	42	Ty Dillon	Petty GMS Motorsports	Chevrolet	174	9
29	4	8	Tyler Reddick	Richard Childress Racing	Chevrolet	170	17
30	13	24	William Byron	Hendrick Motorsports	Chevrolet	170	16
31	20	47	Ricky Stenhouse Jr.	JTG Daugherty Racing	Chevrolet	162	6
32	8	48	Alex Bowman	Hendrick Motorsports	Chevrolet	160	14
33	11	17	Chris Buescher	RFK Racing	Ford	107	4
34	29	16	Noah Gragson (i)	Kaulig Racing	Chevrolet	91	0
35	26	3	Austin Dillon	Richard Childress Racing	Chevrolet	90	2
36	35	78	B. J. McLeod (i)	Live Fast Motorsports	Ford	77	0
Official race results

=== Race statistics ===
- Lead changes: 27 among 12 different drivers
- Cautions/Laps: 13 for 64
- Red flags: 0
- Time of race: 3 hours, 22 minutes and 18 seconds
- Average speed: 118.754 miles per hour (191.116 km/h)

== Media ==
=== Television ===
USA covered the race on the television side. Rick Allen, Jeff Burton, Steve Letarte, and 2004 Atlanta winner Dale Earnhardt Jr. called the race from the broadcast booth. Dave Burns, Kim Coon and Marty Snider handled the pit road duties from pit lane. Rutledge Wood served as a “CityView” reporter and share stories from the famed Dawsonville Pool Room and Georgia Racing Hall of Fame.

USA
Booth announcers	Pit reporters	CityView reporter
Lap-by-lap: Rick Allen; Color-commentator: Jeff Burton; Color-commentator: Steve Letarte; Color-commentator: Dale Earnhardt Jr.	Dave Burns; Kim Coon; Marty Snider	Rutledge Wood

=== Radio ===
The race was broadcast on radio by the Performance Racing Network and simulcast on Sirius XM NASCAR Radio. Doug Rice and Mark Garrow called the race from the booth when the field raced down the front stretch. Doug Turnbull called the race from atop a billboard outside of turn 2 when the field raced through turns 1 and 2 & Pat Patterson called the race from a billboard outside of turn 3 when the field raced through turns 3 and 4. On pit road, PRN was manned by Brad Gillie, Brett McMillan and Wendy Venturini.

PRN
Booth announcers	Turn announcers	Pit reporters
Lead announcer: Doug Rice; Announcer: Mark Garrow	Turns 1 & 2: Doug Turnbull; Turns 3 & 4: Pat Patterson	Brad Gillie; Brett McMillan; Wendy Venturini

== Standings after the race ==
Drivers' Championship standings

	Pos	Driver	Points
	1	Chase Elliott	684
	2	Ryan Blaney	637 (–47)
	3	Ross Chastain	634 (–50)
	4	Kyle Larson	579 (–105)
1	5	Kyle Busch	569 (–115)
1	6	Martin Truex Jr.	566 (–118)
2	7	Joey Logano	562 (–122)
	8	Christopher Bell	523 (–161)
	9	Alex Bowman	508 (–176)
	10	William Byron	505 (–179)
	11	Kevin Harvick	504 (–180)
	12	Aric Almirola	481 (–203)
1	13	Austin Cindric	465 (–219)
1	14	Tyler Reddick	458 (–226)
2	15	Daniel Suárez	451 (–233)
1	16	Kurt Busch	449 (–235)
Official driver's standings

Manufacturers' Championship standings

Pos	Manufacturer	Points
1	Chevrolet	702
2	Ford	640 (–62)
3	Toyota	625 (–77)

- Note: Only the first 16 positions are included for the driver standings.
- . – Driver has clinched a position in the NASCAR Cup Series playoffs.

Previous race: 2022 Kwik Trip 250	NASCAR Cup Series; 2022 season	Next race: 2022 Ambetter 301
