= 2023 Quaker State 400 =

NASCAR Cup Series race

Race details
- Race 19 of 36 in the 2023 NASCAR Cup Series
- Date: July 9, 2023
- Location: Atlanta Motor Speedway in Hampton, Georgia
- Course: Permanent racing facility
- Course length: 1.54 miles (2.48 km)
- Distance: 185 laps, 284.9 mi (458.404 km)
- Scheduled distance: 260 laps, 400.4 mi (644.244 km)
- Average speed: 118.475 miles per hour (190.667 km/h)

Pole position
Driver	Aric Almirola	Stewart-Haas Racing
- Time: 31.261

Most laps led
Driver	Aric Almirola	Stewart-Haas Racing
- Laps: 46

Winner
No. 24	William Byron	Hendrick Motorsports

Television in the United States
- Network: USA
- Announcers: Rick Allen, Jeff Burton, Steve Letarte, and Dale Earnhardt Jr.

Radio in the United States
- Radio: PRN
- Booth announcers: Doug Rice and Mark Garrow
- Turn announcers: Rob Albright (1 & 2) and Pat Patterson (3 & 4)

The 2023 Quaker State 400 was a NASCAR Cup Series race held on July 9, 2023, at Atlanta Motor Speedway in Hampton, Georgia. Originally scheduled for 260 laps on the 1.54-mile-long (2.48 km) asphalt quad-oval intermediate speedway (with superspeedway rules), the race was shortened to 185 laps due to rain. It was the 19th race of the 2023 NASCAR Cup Series season.

== Report ==
=== Background ===
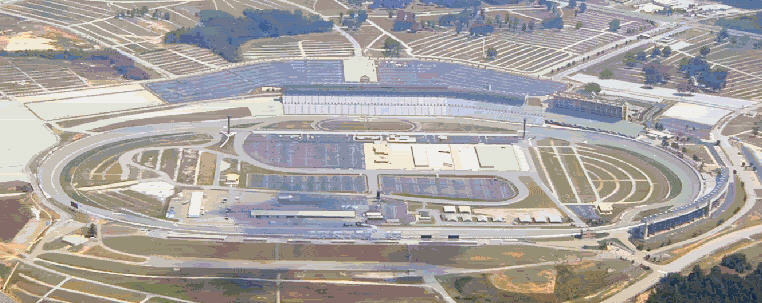
Atlanta Motor Speedway, the track where the race was held.

Atlanta Motor Speedway is a track in Hampton, Georgia, 20 miles (32 km) south of Atlanta. It is a 1.54-mile (2.48 km) quad-oval track with a seating capacity of 111,000. It opened in 1960 as a 1.5-mile (2.4 km) standard oval. In 1994, 46 condominiums were built over the northeastern side of the track. In 1997, to standardize the track with Speedway Motorsports' other two 1.5-mile (2.4 km) ovals, the entire track was almost completely rebuilt. The frontstretch and backstretch were swapped, and the configuration of the track was changed from oval to quad-oval. The project made the track one of the fastest on the NASCAR circuit.

==== Entry list ====
- (R) denotes rookie driver.
- (i) denotes the driver ineligible for series driver points.

No.	Driver	Team	Manufacturer
1	Ross Chastain	Trackhouse Racing	Chevrolet
2	Austin Cindric	Team Penske	Ford
3	Austin Dillon	Richard Childress Racing	Chevrolet
4	Kevin Harvick	Stewart-Haas Racing	Ford
5	Kyle Larson	Hendrick Motorsports	Chevrolet
6	Brad Keselowski	RFK Racing	Ford
7	Corey LaJoie	Spire Motorsports	Chevrolet
8	Kyle Busch	Richard Childress Racing	Chevrolet
9	Chase Elliott	Hendrick Motorsports	Chevrolet
10	Aric Almirola	Stewart-Haas Racing	Ford
11	Denny Hamlin	Joe Gibbs Racing	Toyota
12	Ryan Blaney	Team Penske	Ford
14	Chase Briscoe	Stewart-Haas Racing	Ford
15	J. J. Yeley (i)	Rick Ware Racing	Ford
16	A. J. Allmendinger	Kaulig Racing	Chevrolet
17	Chris Buescher	RFK Racing	Ford
19	Martin Truex Jr.	Joe Gibbs Racing	Toyota
20	Christopher Bell	Joe Gibbs Racing	Toyota
21	Harrison Burton	Wood Brothers Racing	Ford
22	Joey Logano	Team Penske	Ford
23	Bubba Wallace	23XI Racing	Toyota
24	William Byron	Hendrick Motorsports	Chevrolet
31	Justin Haley	Kaulig Racing	Chevrolet
34	Michael McDowell	Front Row Motorsports	Ford
38	Todd Gilliland	Front Row Motorsports	Ford
41	Ryan Preece	Stewart-Haas Racing	Ford
42	Noah Gragson (R)	Legacy Motor Club	Chevrolet
43	Erik Jones	Legacy Motor Club	Chevrolet
45	Tyler Reddick	23XI Racing	Toyota
47	Ricky Stenhouse Jr.	JTG Daugherty Racing	Chevrolet
48	Alex Bowman	Hendrick Motorsports	Chevrolet
51	Cole Custer (i)	Rick Ware Racing	Ford
54	Ty Gibbs (R)	Joe Gibbs Racing	Toyota
62	Austin Hill (i)	Beard Motorsports	Chevrolet
77	Ty Dillon	Spire Motorsports	Chevrolet
78	B. J. McLeod	Live Fast Motorsports	Chevrolet
99	Daniel Suárez	Trackhouse Racing	Chevrolet
Official entry list

== Qualifying ==
Aric Almirola scored the pole for the race with a time 31.261 of and a speed of 177.346 mph (285.411 km/h).

=== Qualifying results ===
Pos	No.	Driver	Team	Manufacturer	R1	R2
1	10	Aric Almirola	Stewart-Haas Racing	Ford	31.387	31.261
2	12	Ryan Blaney	Team Penske	Ford	31.293	31.275
3	14	Chase Briscoe	Stewart-Haas Racing	Ford	31.295	31.296
4	22	Joey Logano	Team Penske	Ford	31.323	31.344
5	21	Harrison Burton	Wood Brothers Racing	Ford	31.341	31.357
6	4	Kevin Harvick	Stewart-Haas Racing	Ford	31.425	31.373
7	54	Ty Gibbs (R)	Joe Gibbs Racing	Toyota	31.369	31.375
8	5	Kyle Larson	Hendrick Motorsports	Chevrolet	31.464	31.388
9	38	Todd Gilliland	Front Row Motorsports	Ford	31.457	31.404
10	2	Austin Cindric	Team Penske	Ford	31.465	31.482
11	6	Brad Keselowski	RFK Racing	Ford	31.477	—
12	45	Tyler Reddick	23XI Racing	Toyota	31.494	—
13	41	Ryan Preece	Stewart-Haas Racing	Ford	31.506	—
14	11	Denny Hamlin	Joe Gibbs Racing	Toyota	31.511	—
15	17	Chris Buescher	RFK Racing	Ford	31.527	—
16	19	Martin Truex Jr.	Joe Gibbs Racing	Toyota	31.574	—
17	31	Justin Haley	Kaulig Racing	Chevrolet	31.574	—
18	24	William Byron	Hendrick Motorsports	Chevrolet	31.579	—
19	16	A. J. Allmendinger	Kaulig Racing	Chevrolet	31.598	—
20	34	Michael McDowell	Front Row Motorsports	Ford	31.611	—
21	51	Cole Custer (i)	Rick Ware Racing	Ford	31.650	—
22	8	Kyle Busch	Richard Childress Racing	Chevrolet	31.731	—
23	9	Chase Elliott	Hendrick Motorsports	Chevrolet	31.751	—
24	15	J. J. Yeley (i)	Rick Ware Racing	Ford	31.770	—
25	43	Erik Jones	Legacy Motor Club	Chevrolet	31.773	—
26	99	Daniel Suárez	Trackhouse Racing	Chevrolet	31.834	—
27	77	Ty Dillon	Spire Motorsports	Chevrolet	31.877	—
28	7	Corey LaJoie	Spire Motorsports	Chevrolet	31.880	—
29	47	Ricky Stenhouse Jr.	JTG Daugherty Racing	Chevrolet	31.924	—
30	1	Ross Chastain	Trackhouse Racing	Chevrolet	32.278	—
31	42	Noah Gragson (R)	Legacy Motor Club	Chevrolet	32.346	—
32	62	Austin Hill (i)	Beard Motorsports	Chevrolet	32.501	—
33	3	Austin Dillon	Richard Childress Racing	Chevrolet	32.525	—
34	20	Christopher Bell	Joe Gibbs Racing	Toyota	32.754	—
35	78	B. J. McLeod	Live Fast Motorsports	Chevrolet	32.990	—
36	48	Alex Bowman	Hendrick Motorsports	Chevrolet	33.539	—
37	23	Bubba Wallace	23XI Racing	Toyota	0.000	—
Official qualifying results

== Race ==
=== Race results ===
==== Stage results ====
Stage One Laps: 60

Pos	No	Driver	Team	Manufacturer	Points
1	12	Ryan Blaney	Team Penske	Ford	10
2	5	Kyle Larson	Hendrick Motorsports	Chevrolet	9
3	19	Martin Truex Jr.	Joe Gibbs Racing	Toyota	8
4	22	Joey Logano	Team Penske	Ford	7
5	24	William Byron	Hendrick Motorsports	Chevrolet	6
6	20	Christopher Bell	Joe Gibbs Racing	Toyota	5
7	2	Austin Cindric	Team Penske	Ford	4
8	34	Michael McDowell	Front Row Motorsports	Ford	3
9	45	Tyler Reddick	23XI Racing	Toyota	2
10	10	Aric Almirola	Stewart-Haas Racing	Ford	1
Official stage one results

Stage Two Laps: 100

Pos	No	Driver	Team	Manufacturer	Points
1	6	Brad Keselowski	RFK Racing	Ford	10
2	12	Ryan Blaney	Team Penske	Ford	9
3	17	Chris Buescher	RFK Racing	Ford	8
4	2	Austin Cindric	Team Penske	Ford	7
5	16	A. J. Allmendinger	Kaulig Racing	Chevrolet	6
6	23	Bubba Wallace	23XI Racing	Toyota	5
7	31	Justin Haley	Kaulig Racing	Chevrolet	4
8	34	Michael McDowell	Front Row Motorsports	Ford	3
9	20	Christopher Bell	Joe Gibbs Racing	Toyota	2
10	41	Ryan Preece	Stewart-Haas Racing	Ford	1
Official stage two results

=== Final Stage results ===
Stage Three Laps: 25 (shortened by rain)

Pos	Grid	No	Driver	Team	Manufacturer	Laps	Points
1	18	24	William Byron	Hendrick Motorsports	Chevrolet	185	46
2	26	99	Daniel Suárez	Trackhouse Racing	Chevrolet	185	35
3	19	16	A. J. Allmendinger	Kaulig Racing	Chevrolet	185	40
4	20	34	Michael McDowell	Front Row Motorsports	Ford	185	39
5	22	8	Kyle Busch	Richard Childress Racing	Chevrolet	185	32
6	11	6	Brad Keselowski	RFK Racing	Ford	185	41
7	24	15	J. J. Yeley (i)	Rick Ware Racing	Ford	185	0
8	17	31	Justin Haley	Kaulig Racing	Chevrolet	185	33
9	2	12	Ryan Blaney	Team Penske	Ford	185	47
10	29	47	Ricky Stenhouse Jr.	JTG Daugherty Racing	Chevrolet	185	27
11	25	43	Erik Jones	Legacy Motor Club	Chevrolet	185	26
12	10	2	Austin Cindric	Team Penske	Ford	185	36
13	23	9	Chase Elliott	Hendrick Motorsports	Chevrolet	185	24
14	14	11	Denny Hamlin	Joe Gibbs Racing	Toyota	185	23
15	15	17	Chris Buescher	RFK Racing	Ford	185	30
16	9	38	Todd Gilliland	Front Row Motorsports	Ford	185	21
17	4	22	Joey Logano	Team Penske	Ford	185	27
18	1	10	Aric Almirola	Stewart-Haas Racing	Ford	185	20
19	27	77	Ty Dillon	Spire Motorsports	Chevrolet	185	18
20	33	78	B. J. McLeod	Live Fast Motorsports	Chevrolet	185	17
21	35	3	Austin Dillon	Richard Childress Racing	Chevrolet	185	16
22	3	14	Chase Briscoe	Stewart-Haas Racing	Ford	185	15
23	34	20	Christopher Bell	Joe Gibbs Racing	Toyota	185	21
24	13	41	Ryan Preece	Stewart-Haas Racing	Ford	185	14
25	37	23	Bubba Wallace	23XI Racing	Toyota	185	17
26	36	48	Alex Bowman	Hendrick Motorsports	Chevrolet	185	11
27	12	45	Tyler Reddick	23XI Racing	Toyota	185	12
28	5	21	Harrison Burton	Wood Brothers Racing	Ford	184	9
29	16	19	Martin Truex Jr.	Joe Gibbs Racing	Toyota	184	16
30	6	4	Kevin Harvick	Stewart-Haas Racing	Ford	181	7
31	28	7	Corey LaJoie	Spire Motorsports	Chevrolet	179	6
32	21	51	Cole Custer (i)	Rick Ware Racing	Ford	178	0
33	31	42	Noah Gragson (R)	Legacy Motor Club	Chevrolet	174	4
34	7	54	Ty Gibbs (R)	Joe Gibbs Racing	Toyota	150	3
35	30	1	Ross Chastain	Trackhouse Racing	Chevrolet	124	2
36	8	5	Kyle Larson	Hendrick Motorsports	Chevrolet	111	10
37	32	62	Austin Hill (i)	Beard Motorsports	Chevrolet	92	0
Official race results

=== Race statistics ===
- Lead changes: 18 among 12 different drivers
- Cautions/Laps: 7 for 43
- Red flags: 1 for weather
- Time of race: 2 hours, 24 minutes, and 17 seconds
- Average speed: 118.475 miles per hour (190.667 km/h)

== Media ==
=== Television ===
USA covered the race on the television side. Rick Allen, Jeff Burton, Steve Letarte, and 2004 Atlanta winner Dale Earnhardt Jr. called the race from the broadcast booth. Dave Burns, Kim Coon and Marty Snider handled the pit road duties from pit lane.

USA
Booth announcers	Pit reporters
Lap-by-lap: Rick Allen; Color-commentator: Jeff Burton; Color-commentator: Steve Letarte; Color-commentator: Dale Earnhardt Jr.	Dave Burns; Kim Coon; Marty Snider

=== Radio ===
The race was broadcast on radio by the Performance Racing Network and simulcast on Sirius XM NASCAR Radio. Doug Rice and Mark Garrow called the race from the booth when the field raced down the front stretch. Rob Albright called the race from atop a billboard outside of turn 2 when the field raced through turns 1 and 2. Pat Patterson called the race from a billboard outside of turn 3 when the field raced through turns 3 and 4. On pit road, PRN was manned by Brad Gillie, Brett McMillan, Doug Turnbull and Wendy Venturini.

PRN
Booth announcers	Turn announcers	Pit reporters
Lead announcer: Doug Rice; Announcer: Mark Garrow	Turns 1 & 2: Rob Albright; Turns 3 & 4: Pat Patterson	Brad Gillie; Brett McMillan; Doug Turnbull; Wendy Venturini

== Standings after the race ==
Drivers' Championship standings

	Pos	Driver	Points
1	1	William Byron	628
1	2	Martin Truex Jr.	607 (–21)
2	3	Kyle Busch	592 (–36)
	4	Christopher Bell	591 (–37)
2	5	Ross Chastain	575 (–53)
	6	Denny Hamlin	561 (–67)
2	7	Ryan Blaney	553 (–75)
	8	Kyle Larson	531 (–97)
2	9	Kevin Harvick	530 (–98)
	10	Joey Logano	518 (–110)
	11	Chris Buescher	506 (–122)
1	12	Brad Keselowski	504 (–124)
1	13	Tyler Reddick	475 (–153)
	14	Ricky Stenhouse Jr.	445 (–183)
2	15	Daniel Suárez	407 (–221)
2	16	Michael McDowell	407 (–221)
Official driver's standings

Manufacturers' Championship standings

Pos	Manufacturer	Points
1	Chevrolet	722
2	Toyota	649 (–73)
3	Ford	636 (–86)

- Note: Only the first 16 positions are included for the driver standings.
- . – Driver has clinched a position in the NASCAR Cup Series playoffs.

Previous race: 2023 Grant Park 220	NASCAR Cup Series; 2023 season	Next race: 2023 Crayon 301
