= 2023 Ambetter Health 400 =

Fifth race of the 2023 NASCAR Cup Series

Race details
- Race 5 of 36 in the 2023 NASCAR Cup Series
- Date: March 19, 2023
- Location: Atlanta Motor Speedway in Hampton, Georgia
- Course: Permanent racing facility
- Course length: 1.54 miles (2.48 km)
- Distance: 260 laps, 400.4 mi (644.4 km)
- Average speed: 138.8 miles per hour (223.4 km/h)

Pole position
| Driver | Joey Logano | Team Penske |
- Time: 31.256

Most laps led
| Driver | Joey Logano | Team Penske |
- Laps: 140

Winner
| No. 22 | Joey Logano | Team Penske |

Television in the United States
- Network: Fox
- Announcers: Mike Joy, Clint Bowyer, and Tony Stewart

Radio in the United States
- Radio: PRN
- Booth announcers: Doug Rice and Mark Garrow
- Turn announcers: Rob Albright (1 & 2) and Pat Patterson (3 & 4)

The 2023 Ambetter Health 400 was a NASCAR Cup Series race that was held on March 19, 2023, at Atlanta Motor Speedway in Hampton, Georgia. Contested over 260 laps on the 1.54-mile-long (2.48 km) asphalt quad-oval intermediate speedway (with superspeedway rules), it was the fifth race of the 2023 NASCAR Cup Series season.

== Report ==
=== Background ===
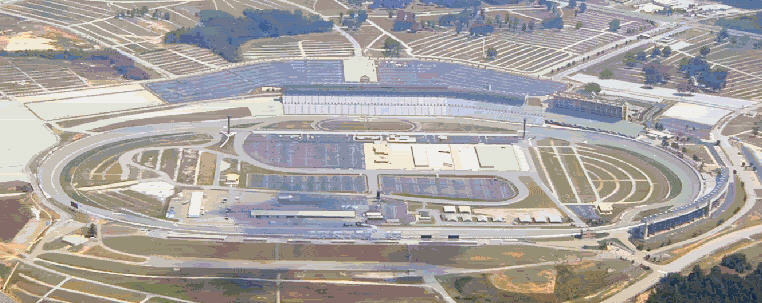
Atlanta Motor Speedway, the track where the race was held.

Atlanta Motor Speedway (formerly Atlanta International Raceway) is a 1.54-mile race track in Hampton, Georgia, United States, 20 miles (32 km) south of Atlanta. It has annually hosted NASCAR Cup Series stock car races since its inauguration in 1960.

The venue was bought by Speedway Motorsports in 1990. In 1994, 46 condominiums were built over the northeastern side of the track. In 1997, to standardize the track with Speedway Motorsports' other two intermediate ovals, the entire track was almost completely rebuilt. The frontstretch and backstretch were swapped, and the configuration of the track was changed from oval to quad-oval, with a new official length of 1.54-mile (2.48 km) where before it was 1.522-mile (2.449 km). The project made the track one of the fastest on the NASCAR circuit. In July 2021 NASCAR announced that the track would be reprofiled for the 2022 season to have 28 degrees of banking and would be narrowed from 55 to 40 feet which the track claims will turn racing at the track similar to restrictor plate superspeedways. Despite the reprofiling being criticized by drivers, construction began in August 2021 and wrapped up in December 2021. The track has seating capacity of 71,000 to 125,000 people depending on the tracks configuration.

==== Entry list ====
- (R) denotes rookie driver.
- (i) denotes driver who is ineligible for series driver points.

| No. | Driver | Team | Manufacturer |
|---|---|---|---|
| 1 | Ross Chastain | Trackhouse Racing | Chevrolet |
| 2 | Austin Cindric | Team Penske | Ford |
| 3 | Austin Dillon | Richard Childress Racing | Chevrolet |
| 4 | Kevin Harvick | Stewart-Haas Racing | Ford |
| 5 | Kyle Larson | Hendrick Motorsports | Chevrolet |
| 6 | Brad Keselowski | RFK Racing | Ford |
| 7 | Corey LaJoie | Spire Motorsports | Chevrolet |
| 8 | Kyle Busch | Richard Childress Racing | Chevrolet |
| 9 | Josh Berry (i) | Hendrick Motorsports | Chevrolet |
| 10 | Aric Almirola | Stewart-Haas Racing | Ford |
| 11 | Denny Hamlin | Joe Gibbs Racing | Toyota |
| 12 | Ryan Blaney | Team Penske | Ford |
| 14 | Chase Briscoe | Stewart-Haas Racing | Ford |
| 15 | J. J. Yeley | Rick Ware Racing | Ford |
| 16 | A. J. Allmendinger | Kaulig Racing | Chevrolet |
| 17 | Chris Buescher | RFK Racing | Ford |
| 19 | Martin Truex Jr. | Joe Gibbs Racing | Toyota |
| 20 | Christopher Bell | Joe Gibbs Racing | Toyota |
| 21 | Harrison Burton | Wood Brothers Racing | Ford |
| 22 | Joey Logano | Team Penske | Ford |
| 23 | Bubba Wallace | 23XI Racing | Toyota |
| 24 | William Byron | Hendrick Motorsports | Chevrolet |
| 31 | Justin Haley | Kaulig Racing | Chevrolet |
| 34 | Michael McDowell | Front Row Motorsports | Ford |
| 38 | Todd Gilliland | Front Row Motorsports | Ford |
| 41 | Ryan Preece | Stewart-Haas Racing | Ford |
| 42 | Noah Gragson (R) | Legacy Motor Club | Chevrolet |
| 43 | Erik Jones | Legacy Motor Club | Chevrolet |
| 45 | Tyler Reddick | 23XI Racing | Toyota |
| 47 | Ricky Stenhouse Jr. | JTG Daugherty Racing | Chevrolet |
| 48 | Alex Bowman | Hendrick Motorsports | Chevrolet |
| 51 | Cody Ware | Rick Ware Racing | Ford |
| 54 | Ty Gibbs (R) | Joe Gibbs Racing | Toyota |
| 77 | Ty Dillon | Spire Motorsports | Chevrolet |
| 78 | B. J. McLeod | Live Fast Motorsports | Chevrolet |
| 99 | Daniel Suárez | Trackhouse Racing | Chevrolet |
Official entry list

== Qualifying ==
Joey Logano scored the pole for the race with a time of 31.256 and a speed of 177.374 mph (285.456 km/h).

=== Qualifying results ===
| Pos | No. | Driver | Team | Manufacturer | R1 | R2 |
|---|---|---|---|---|---|---|
| 1 | 22 | Joey Logano | Team Penske | Ford | 31.348 | 31.256 |
| 2 | 2 | Austin Cindric | Team Penske | Ford | 31.527 | 31.262 |
| 3 | 12 | Ryan Blaney | Team Penske | Ford | 31.276 | 31.284 |
| 4 | 6 | Brad Keselowski | RFK Racing | Ford | 31.369 | 31.323 |
| 5 | 10 | Aric Almirola | Stewart-Haas Racing | Ford | 31.353 | 31.324 |
| 6 | 4 | Kevin Harvick | Stewart-Haas Racing | Ford | 31.528 | 31.363 |
| 7 | 17 | Chris Buescher | RFK Racing | Ford | 31.386 | 31.367 |
| 8 | 14 | Chase Briscoe | Stewart-Haas Racing | Ford | 31.403 | 31.396 |
| 9 | 5 | Kyle Larson | Hendrick Motorsports | Chevrolet | 31.506 | 31.462 |
| 10 | 20 | Christopher Bell | Joe Gibbs Racing | Toyota | 31.497 | 0.000 |
| 11 | 24 | William Byron | Hendrick Motorsports | Chevrolet | 31.544 | — |
| 12 | 34 | Michael McDowell | Front Row Motorsports | Ford | 31.545 | — |
| 13 | 3 | Austin Dillon | Richard Childress Racing | Chevrolet | 31.548 | — |
| 14 | 11 | Denny Hamlin | Joe Gibbs Racing | Toyota | 31.554 | — |
| 15 | 48 | Alex Bowman | Hendrick Motorsports | Chevrolet | 31.554 | — |
| 16 | 45 | Tyler Reddick | 23XI Racing | Toyota | 31.574 | — |
| 17 | 8 | Kyle Busch | Richard Childress Racing | Chevrolet | 31.583 | — |
| 18 | 1 | Ross Chastain | Trackhouse Racing | Chevrolet | 31.597 | — |
| 19 | 23 | Bubba Wallace | 23XI Racing | Toyota | 31.636 | — |
| 20 | 31 | Justin Haley | Kaulig Racing | Chevrolet | 31.642 | — |
| 21 | 9 | Josh Berry (i) | Hendrick Motorsports | Chevrolet | 31.662 | — |
| 22 | 42 | Noah Gragson (R) | Legacy Motor Club | Chevrolet | 31.680 | — |
| 23 | 38 | Todd Gilliland | Front Row Motorsports | Ford | 31.696 | — |
| 24 | 41 | Ryan Preece | Stewart-Haas Racing | Ford | 31.801 | — |
| 25 | 99 | Daniel Suárez | Trackhouse Racing | Chevrolet | 31.835 | — |
| 26 | 77 | Ty Dillon | Spire Motorsports | Chevrolet | 31.835 | — |
| 27 | 47 | Ricky Stenhouse Jr. | JTG Daugherty Racing | Chevrolet | 31.837 | — |
| 28 | 43 | Erik Jones | Legacy Motor Club | Chevrolet | 31.853 | — |
| 29 | 19 | Martin Truex Jr. | Joe Gibbs Racing | Toyota | 31.859 | — |
| 30 | 16 | A. J. Allmendinger | Kaulig Racing | Chevrolet | 31.939 | — |
| 31 | 7 | Corey LaJoie | Spire Motorsports | Chevrolet | 31.945 | — |
| 32 | 51 | Cody Ware | Rick Ware Racing | Ford | 32.064 | — |
| 33 | 21 | Harrison Burton | Wood Brothers Racing | Ford | 32.540 | — |
| 34 | 15 | J. J. Yeley (i) | Rick Ware Racing | Ford | 32.559 | — |
| 35 | 54 | Ty Gibbs (R) | Joe Gibbs Racing | Toyota | 34.582 | — |
| 36 | 78 | B. J. McLeod | Live Fast Motorsports | Chevrolet | 0.000 | — |
Official qualifying results

== Race ==
=== Race results ===
==== Stage Results ====
Stage One Laps: 60

| Pos | No | Driver | Team | Manufacturer | Points |
|---|---|---|---|---|---|
| 1 | 22 | Joey Logano | Team Penske | Ford | 10 |
| 2 | 2 | Austin Cindric | Team Penske | Ford | 9 |
| 3 | 6 | Brad Keselowski | RFK Racing | Ford | 8 |
| 4 | 12 | Ryan Blaney | Team Penske | Ford | 7 |
| 5 | 11 | Denny Hamlin | Joe Gibbs Racing | Toyota | 6 |
| 6 | 20 | Christopher Bell | Joe Gibbs Racing | Toyota | 5 |
| 7 | 8 | Kyle Busch | Richard Childress Racing | Chevrolet | 4 |
| 8 | 17 | Chris Buescher | RFK Racing | Ford | 3 |
| 9 | 99 | Daniel Suárez | Trackhouse Racing | Chevrolet | 2 |
| 10 | 19 | Martin Truex Jr. | Joe Gibbs Racing | Toyota | 1 |
Official stage one results

Stage Two Laps: 100

| Pos | No | Driver | Team | Manufacturer | Points |
|---|---|---|---|---|---|
| 1 | 2 | Austin Cindric | Team Penske | Ford | 10 |
| 2 | 22 | Joey Logano | Team Penske | Ford | 9 |
| 3 | 48 | Alex Bowman | Hendrick Motorsports | Chevrolet | 8 |
| 4 | 45 | Tyler Reddick | 23XI Racing | Toyota | 7 |
| 5 | 24 | William Byron | Hendrick Motorsports | Chevrolet | 6 |
| 6 | 17 | Chris Buescher | RFK Racing | Ford | 5 |
| 7 | 19 | Martin Truex Jr. | Joe Gibbs Racing | Toyota | 4 |
| 8 | 11 | Denny Hamlin | Joe Gibbs Racing | Toyota | 3 |
| 9 | 6 | Brad Keselowski | RFK Racing | Ford | 2 |
| 10 | 7 | Corey LaJoie | Spire Motorsports | Chevrolet | 1 |
Official stage two results

=== Final Stage Results ===
Stage Three Laps: 100

| Pos | Grid | No | Driver | Team | Manufacturer | Laps | Points |
|---|---|---|---|---|---|---|---|
| 1 | 1 | 22 | Joey Logano | Team Penske | Ford | 260 | 59 |
| 2 | 4 | 6 | Brad Keselowski | RFK Racing | Ford | 260 | 45 |
| 3 | 10 | 20 | Christopher Bell | Joe Gibbs Racing | Toyota | 260 | 39 |
| 4 | 31 | 7 | Corey LaJoie | Spire Motorsports | Chevrolet | 260 | 34 |
| 5 | 16 | 45 | Tyler Reddick | 23XI Racing | Toyota | 260 | 39 |
| 6 | 14 | 11 | Denny Hamlin | Joe Gibbs Racing | Toyota | 260 | 40 |
| 7 | 3 | 12 | Ryan Blaney | Team Penske | Ford | 260 | 37 |
| 8 | 28 | 43 | Erik Jones | Legacy Motor Club | Chevrolet | 260 | 29 |
| 9 | 35 | 54 | Ty Gibbs (R) | Joe Gibbs Racing | Toyota | 260 | 28 |
| 10 | 17 | 8 | Kyle Busch | Richard Childress Racing | Chevrolet | 260 | 31 |
| 11 | 2 | 2 | Austin Cindric | Team Penske | Ford | 260 | 45 |
| 12 | 22 | 42 | Noah Gragson (R) | Legacy Motor Club | Chevrolet | 260 | 25 |
| 13 | 18 | 1 | Ross Chastain | Trackhouse Racing | Chevrolet | 260 | 24 |
| 14 | 15 | 48 | Alex Bowman | Hendrick Motorsports | Chevrolet | 260 | 31 |
| 15 | 23 | 38 | Todd Gilliland | Front Row Motorsports | Ford | 260 | 22 |
| 16 | 30 | 16 | A. J. Allmendinger | Kaulig Racing | Chevrolet | 260 | 21 |
| 17 | 27 | 47 | Ricky Stenhouse Jr. | JTG Daugherty Racing | Chevrolet | 260 | 20 |
| 18 | 21 | 9 | Josh Berry (i) | Hendrick Motorsports | Chevrolet | 260 | 0 |
| 19 | 29 | 19 | Martin Truex Jr. | Joe Gibbs Racing | Toyota | 260 | 22 |
| 20 | 13 | 3 | Austin Dillon | Richard Childress Racing | Chevrolet | 260 | 17 |
| 21 | 12 | 34 | Michael McDowell | Front Row Motorsports | Ford | 260 | 16 |
| 22 | 20 | 31 | Justin Haley | Kaulig Racing | Chevrolet | 260 | 15 |
| 23 | 26 | 77 | Ty Dillon | Spire Motorsports | Chevrolet | 260 | 14 |
| 24 | 8 | 14 | Chase Briscoe | Stewart-Haas Racing | Ford | 259 | 13 |
| 25 | 32 | 51 | Cody Ware | Rick Ware Racing | Ford | 258 | 12 |
| 26 | 34 | 15 | J. J. Yeley (i) | Rick Ware Racing | Ford | 258 | 0 |
| 27 | 19 | 23 | Bubba Wallace | 23XI Racing | Toyota | 255 | 10 |
| 28 | 24 | 41 | Ryan Preece | Stewart-Haas Racing | Ford | 242 | 9 |
| 29 | 25 | 99 | Daniel Suárez | Trackhouse Racing | Chevrolet | 213 | 10 |
| 30 | 5 | 10 | Aric Almirola | Stewart-Haas Racing | Ford | 208 | 7 |
| 31 | 9 | 5 | Kyle Larson | Hendrick Motorsports | Chevrolet | 208 | 6 |
| 32 | 11 | 24 | William Byron | Hendrick Motorsports | Chevrolet | 192 | 11 |
| 33 | 6 | 4 | Kevin Harvick | Stewart-Haas Racing | Ford | 190 | 4 |
| 34 | 33 | 21 | Harrison Burton | Wood Brothers Racing | Ford | 190 | 3 |
| 35 | 7 | 17 | Chris Buescher | RFK Racing | Ford | 189 | 10 |
| 36 | 36 | 78 | B. J. McLeod | Live Fast Motorsports | Chevrolet | 189 | 1 |
Official race results

=== Race statistics ===
- Lead changes: 20 among 13 different drivers
- Cautions/Laps: 5 for 34 laps
- Red flags: 0
- Time of race: 2 hours, 53 minutes and 5 seconds
- Average speed: 138.8 miles per hour (223.4 km/h)

== Media ==
=== Television ===
Fox Sports was carried by Fox in the United States. Mike Joy, Clint Bowyer, and three-time Atlanta winner, three-time NASCAR Cup Series champion and co-owner of Stewart-Haas Racing Tony Stewart called the race from the broadcast booth. Jamie Little and Regan Smith handled pit road for the television side, and Larry McReynolds provided insight from the Fox Sports studio in Charlotte.

Fox
| Booth announcers | Pit reporters | In-race analyst |
|---|---|---|
| Lap-by-lap: Mike Joy; Color-commentator: Clint Bowyer; Color-commentator: Tony Stewart | Jamie Little; Regan Smith | Larry McReynolds |

=== Radio ===
The race was broadcast on radio by the Performance Racing Network and simulcast on Sirius XM NASCAR Radio. Doug Rice and Mark Garrow called the race from the booth when the field raced down the front stretch. Rob Albright called the race from atop a billboard outside of turn 2 when the field raced through turns 1 and 2, and Pat Patterson called the race from a billboard outside of turn 3 when the field raced through turns 3 and 4. On pit road, PRN was manned by Brad Gillie, Doug Turnbull, and Wendy Venturini.

PRN
| Booth announcers | Turn announcers | Pit reporters |
|---|---|---|
| Lead announcer: Doug Rice; Announcer: Mark Garrow | Turns 1 & 2: Rob Albright; Turns 3 & 4: Pat Patterson | Brad Gillie; Doug Turnbull; Wendy Venturini |

== Standings after the race ==
Drivers' Championship standings

| | Pos | Driver | Points |
|---|---|---|---|
| 7 | 1 | Joey Logano | 177 |
| 1 | 2 | Christopher Bell | 176 (–1) |
| 1 | 3 | Ross Chastain | 172 (–5) |
| | 4 | Ryan Blaney | 161 (–16) |
| 4 | 5 | Brad Keselowski | 160 (–17) |
| 5 | 6 | Kevin Harvick | 155 (–22) |
| 2 | 7 | Kyle Busch | 153 (–24) |
| 2 | 8 | Martin Truex Jr. | 145 (–32) |
| 3 | 9 | Denny Hamlin | 140 (–37) |
| 3 | 10 | Daniel Suárez | 129 (–48) |
| 3 | 11 | Austin Cindric | 126 (–51) |
| 1 | 12 | Ricky Stenhouse Jr. | 124 (–53) |
| 3 | 13 | Chris Buescher | 122 (–55) |
| 1 | 14 | Corey LaJoie | 113 (–64) |
| 2 | 15 | Tyler Reddick | 111 (–66) |
| 3 | 16 | Bubba Wallace | 102 (–75) |
Official driver's standings

Manufacturers' Championship standings

| Pos | Manufacturer | Points |
|---|---|---|
| 1 | Chevrolet | 193 |
| 2 | Ford | 173 (–20) |
| 3 | Toyota | 166 (–27) |

- Note: Only the first 16 positions are included for the driver standings.

| Previous race: 2023 United Rentals Work United 500 | NASCAR Cup Series; 2023 season | Next race: 2023 EchoPark Automotive Grand Prix |
