= 2023 South Point 400 =

Race details
- Race 33 of 36 in the 2023 NASCAR Cup Series
- Date: October 15, 2023
- Location: Las Vegas Motor Speedway in Las Vegas, Nevada
- Course: Permanent racing facility
- Course length: 1.5 miles (2.4 km)
- Distance: 267 laps, 400.5 mi (640.8 km)
- Average speed: 135.635 miles per hour (218.283 km/h)

Pole position
Driver	Christopher Bell	Joe Gibbs Racing
- Time: 28.980

Most laps led
Driver	Kyle Larson	Hendrick Motorsports
- Laps: 133

Winner
No. 5	Kyle Larson	Hendrick Motorsports

Television in the United States
- Network: NBC
- Announcers: Rick Allen, Jeff Burton, Steve Letarte and Dale Earnhardt Jr.

Radio in the United States
- Radio: PRN
- Booth announcers: Doug Rice and Mark Garrow
- Turn announcers: Nick Yeoman (1 & 2) and Pat Patterson (3 & 4)

The 2023 South Point 400 was a NASCAR Cup Series race held on October 15, 2023, at Las Vegas Motor Speedway in Las Vegas, Nevada. Contested over 267 laps on the 1.5 mile (2.4 km) intermediate quad-oval, it was the 33rd race of the 2023 NASCAR Cup Series season, seventh race of the Playoffs, and first race of the Round of 8. Kyle Larson won the race and secured his 2nd Championship 4 appearance in three years.

== Report ==
=== Background ===
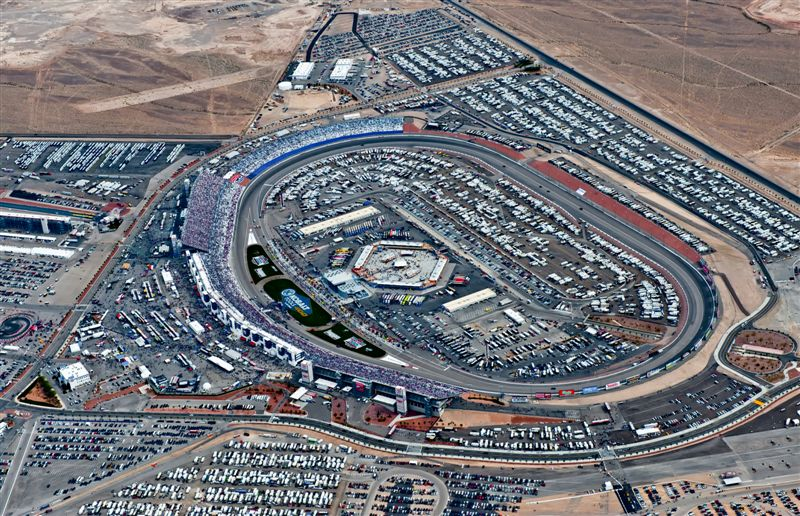
Las Vegas Motor Speedway, the track where the race was held.

Las Vegas Motor Speedway, located in Clark County, Nevada outside the Las Vegas city limits and about 15 miles northeast of the Las Vegas Strip, is a 1,200-acre (490 ha) complex of multiple tracks for motorsports racing. The complex is owned by Speedway Motorsports, Inc., which is headquartered in Charlotte, North Carolina.

==== Entry list ====
- (R) denotes rookie driver.
- (i) denotes driver who is ineligible for series driver points.
- (P) denotes playoff driver.
- (OP) denotes owner's playoffs car.

No.	Driver	Team	Manufacturer
1	Ross Chastain	Trackhouse Racing	Chevrolet
2	Austin Cindric	Team Penske	Ford
3	Austin Dillon	Richard Childress Racing	Chevrolet
4	Kevin Harvick	Stewart-Haas Racing	Ford
5	Kyle Larson (P)	Hendrick Motorsports	Chevrolet
6	Brad Keselowski	RFK Racing	Ford
7	Corey LaJoie	Spire Motorsports	Chevrolet
8	Kyle Busch	Richard Childress Racing	Chevrolet
9	Chase Elliott (OP)	Hendrick Motorsports	Chevrolet
10	Aric Almirola	Stewart-Haas Racing	Ford
11	Denny Hamlin (P)	Joe Gibbs Racing	Toyota
12	Ryan Blaney (P)	Team Penske	Ford
14	Chase Briscoe	Stewart-Haas Racing	Ford
15	Brennan Poole (i)	Rick Ware Racing	Ford
16	A. J. Allmendinger	Kaulig Racing	Chevrolet
17	Chris Buescher (P)	RFK Racing	Ford
19	Martin Truex Jr. (P)	Joe Gibbs Racing	Toyota
20	Christopher Bell (P)	Joe Gibbs Racing	Toyota
21	Harrison Burton	Wood Brothers Racing	Ford
22	Joey Logano	Team Penske	Ford
23	Bubba Wallace	23XI Racing	Toyota
24	William Byron (P)	Hendrick Motorsports	Chevrolet
31	Justin Haley	Kaulig Racing	Chevrolet
34	Michael McDowell	Front Row Motorsports	Ford
38	Todd Gilliland	Front Row Motorsports	Ford
41	Ryan Preece	Stewart-Haas Racing	Ford
42	Carson Hocevar (i)	Legacy Motor Club	Chevrolet
43	Erik Jones	Legacy Motor Club	Chevrolet
45	Tyler Reddick (P)	23XI Racing	Toyota
47	Ricky Stenhouse Jr.	JTG Daugherty Racing	Chevrolet
48	Alex Bowman	Hendrick Motorsports	Chevrolet
51	J. J. Yeley (i)	Rick Ware Racing	Ford
54	Ty Gibbs (R)	Joe Gibbs Racing	Toyota
77	Ty Dillon	Spire Motorsports	Chevrolet
78	B. J. McLeod (i)	Live Fast Motorsports	Chevrolet
99	Daniel Suárez	Trackhouse Racing	Chevrolet
Official entry list

== Practice ==
Ross Chastain was the fastest in the practice session with a time of 28.899 seconds and a speed of 186.858 mph (300.719 km/h).

=== Practice results ===
Pos	No.	Driver	Team	Manufacturer	Time	Speed
1	1	Ross Chastain	Trackhouse Racing	Chevrolet	28.899	186.858
2	17	Chris Buescher (P)	RFK Racing	Ford	28.933	186.638
3	45	Tyler Reddick (P)	23XI Racing	Toyota	29.039	185.957
Official practice results

== Qualifying ==
Christopher Bell scored the pole for the race with a time of 28.980 and a speed of 186.335 mph (299.877 km/h).

=== Qualifying results ===
Pos	No.	Driver	Team	Manufacturer	R1	R2
1	20	Christopher Bell (P)	Joe Gibbs Racing	Toyota	28.938	28.980
2	5	Kyle Larson (P)	Hendrick Motorsports	Chevrolet	28.964	28.990
3	24	William Byron (P)	Hendrick Motorsports	Chevrolet	28.941	29.004
4	19	Martin Truex Jr. (P)	Joe Gibbs Racing	Toyota	29.189	29.070
5	17	Chris Buescher (P)	RFK Racing	Ford	29.005	29.084
6	8	Kyle Busch	Richard Childress Racing	Chevrolet	29.172	29.093
7	23	Bubba Wallace	23XI Racing	Toyota	29.172	29.120
8	45	Tyler Reddick (P)	23XI Racing	Toyota	29.210	29.129
9	22	Joey Logano	Team Penske	Ford	29.022	29.147
10	1	Ross Chastain	Trackhouse Racing	Chevrolet	29.014	29.163
11	54	Ty Gibbs (R)	Joe Gibbs Racing	Toyota	29.029	—
12	12	Ryan Blaney (P)	Team Penske	Ford	29.157	—
13	10	Aric Almirola	Stewart-Haas Racing	Ford	29.214	—
14	48	Alex Bowman	Hendrick Motorsports	Chevrolet	29.238	—
15	11	Denny Hamlin (P)	Joe Gibbs Racing	Toyota	29.245	—
16	3	Austin Dillon	Richard Childress Racing	Chevrolet	29.262	—
17	14	Chase Briscoe	Stewart-Haas Racing	Ford	29.293	—
18	34	Michael McDowell	Front Row Motorsports	Ford	29.298	—
19	2	Austin Cindric	Team Penske	Ford	29.317	—
20	31	Justin Haley	Kaulig Racing	Chevrolet	29.327	—
21	6	Brad Keselowski	RFK Racing	Ford	29.346	—
22	16	A. J. Allmendinger	Kaulig Racing	Chevrolet	29.357	—
23	43	Erik Jones	Legacy Motor Club	Chevrolet	29.396	—
24	4	Kevin Harvick	Stewart-Haas Racing	Ford	29.410	—
25	42	Carson Hocevar (i)	Legacy Motor Club	Chevrolet	29.461	—
26	51	J. J. Yeley (i)	Rick Ware Racing	Ford	29.475	—
27	77	Ty Dillon	Spire Motorsports	Chevrolet	29.539	—
28	7	Corey LaJoie	Spire Motorsports	Chevrolet	29.627	—
29	38	Todd Gilliland	Front Row Motorsports	Ford	29.699	—
30	47	Ricky Stenhouse Jr.	JTG Daugherty Racing	Chevrolet	29.717	—
31	78	B. J. McLeod (i)	Live Fast Motorsports	Chevrolet	29.875	—
32	41	Ryan Preece	Stewart-Haas Racing	Ford	29.991	—
33	21	Harrison Burton	Wood Brothers Racing	Ford	30.031	—
34	15	Brennan Poole (i)	Rick Ware Racing	Ford	30.192	—
35	9	Chase Elliott (OP)	Hendrick Motorsports	Chevrolet	0.000	—
36	99	Daniel Suárez	Trackhouse Racing	Chevrolet	0.000	—
Official qualifying results

== Race ==
=== Race results ===
==== Stage results ====
Stage One Laps: 80

Pos	No	Driver	Team	Manufacturer	Points
1	5	Kyle Larson (P)	Hendrick Motorsports	Chevrolet	10
2	20	Christopher Bell (P)	Joe Gibbs Racing	Toyota	9
3	6	Brad Keselowski	RFK Racing	Ford	8
4	45	Tyler Reddick (P)	23XI Racing	Toyota	7
5	19	Martin Truex Jr. (P)	Joe Gibbs Racing	Toyota	6
6	12	Ryan Blaney (P)	Team Penske	Ford	5
7	11	Denny Hamlin (P)	Joe Gibbs Racing	Toyota	4
8	8	Kyle Busch	Richard Childress Racing	Chevrolet	3
9	4	Kevin Harvick	Stewart-Haas Racing	Ford	2
10	24	William Byron (P)	Hendrick Motorsports	Chevrolet	1
Official stage one results

Stage Two Laps: 85

Pos	No	Driver	Team	Manufacturer	Points
1	5	Kyle Larson (P)	Hendrick Motorsports	Chevrolet	10
2	1	Ross Chastain	Trackhouse Racing	Chevrolet	9
3	20	Christopher Bell (P)	Joe Gibbs Racing	Toyota	8
4	11	Denny Hamlin (P)	Joe Gibbs Racing	Toyota	7
5	6	Brad Keselowski	RFK Racing	Ford	6
6	24	William Byron (P)	Hendrick Motorsports	Chevrolet	5
7	8	Kyle Busch	Richard Childress Racing	Chevrolet	4
8	12	Ryan Blaney (P)	Team Penske	Ford	3
9	45	Tyler Reddick (P)	23XI Racing	Toyota	2
10	23	Bubba Wallace	23XI Racing	Toyota	1
Official stage two results

=== Final Stage results ===
Stage Three Laps: 102

Pos	Grid	No	Driver	Team	Manufacturer	Laps	Points
1	2	5	Kyle Larson (P)	Hendrick Motorsports	Chevrolet	267	60
2	1	20	Christopher Bell (P)	Joe Gibbs Racing	Toyota	267	52
3	6	8	Kyle Busch	Richard Childress Racing	Chevrolet	267	41
4	21	6	Brad Keselowski	RFK Racing	Ford	267	47
5	10	1	Ross Chastain	Trackhouse Racing	Chevrolet	267	41
6	12	12	Ryan Blaney (P) (Note: Blaney was originally was disqualified after failing post-race inspection as it was discovered that his car's left front shock didn't meet overall specified length. The disqualification was later overturned due to an issue with the damper template used during the inspection.)	Team Penske	Ford	267	39
7	3	24	William Byron (P)	Hendrick Motorsports	Chevrolet	267	36
8	8	45	Tyler Reddick (P)	23XI Racing	Toyota	267	38
9	4	19	Martin Truex Jr. (P)	Joe Gibbs Racing	Toyota	267	34
10	15	11	Denny Hamlin (P)	Joe Gibbs Racing	Toyota	267	38
11	5	17	Chris Buescher (P)	RFK Racing	Ford	267	26
12	9	22	Joey Logano	Team Penske	Ford	267	25
13	7	23	Bubba Wallace	23XI Racing	Toyota	267	25
14	13	10	Aric Almirola	Stewart-Haas Racing	Ford	267	23
15	36	99	Daniel Suárez	Trackhouse Racing	Chevrolet	267	22
16	24	4	Kevin Harvick	Stewart-Haas Racing	Ford	267	23
17	18	34	Michael McDowell	Front Row Motorsports	Ford	267	20
18	16	3	Austin Dillon	Richard Childress Racing	Chevrolet	267	19
19	28	7	Corey LaJoie	Spire Motorsports	Chevrolet	267	18
20	33	21	Harrison Burton	Wood Brothers Racing	Ford	267	17
21	22	16	A. J. Allmendinger	Kaulig Racing	Chevrolet	267	16
22	20	31	Justin Haley	Kaulig Racing	Chevrolet	267	15
23	19	2	Austin Cindric	Team Penske	Ford	267	14
24	27	77	Ty Dillon	Spire Motorsports	Chevrolet	267	13
25	30	47	Ricky Stenhouse Jr.	JTG Daugherty Racing	Chevrolet	267	12
26	32	41	Ryan Preece	Stewart-Haas Racing	Ford	267	11
27	29	38	Todd Gilliland	Front Row Motorsports	Ford	266	10
28	23	43	Erik Jones	Legacy Motor Club	Chevrolet	266	9
29	26	51	J. J. Yeley (i)	Rick Ware Racing	Ford	266	0
30	34	15	Brennan Poole (i)	Rick Ware Racing	Ford	266	0
31	31	78	B. J. McLeod (i)	Live Fast Motorsports	Chevrolet	266	0
32	35	9	Chase Elliott (OP)	Hendrick Motorsports	Chevrolet	266	5
33	17	14	Chase Briscoe	Stewart-Haas Racing	Ford	263	4
34	11	54	Ty Gibbs (R)	Joe Gibbs Racing	Toyota	259	3
35	14	48	Alex Bowman	Hendrick Motorsports	Chevrolet	144	2
36	25	42	Carson Hocevar (i)	Legacy Motor Club	Chevrolet	110	0
Official race results

=== Race statistics ===
- Lead changes: 20 among 7 different drivers
- Cautions/Laps: 7 for 36 laps
- Red flags: 0
- Time of race: 2 hours, 57 minutes, and 10 seconds
- Average speed: 135.635 miles per hour (218.283 km/h)

== Media ==
=== Television ===
NBC covered the race on the television side. Rick Allen, Two–time Las Vegas winner Jeff Burton, Steve Letarte and Dale Earnhardt Jr. called the race from the broadcast booth. Dave Burns, Kim Coon and Marty Snider handled the pit road duties from pit lane.

NBC
Booth announcers	Pit reporters
Lap-by-lap: Rick Allen; Color-commentator: Jeff Burton; Color-commentator: Steve Letarte; Color-commentator: Dale Earnhardt Jr.	Dave Burns; Kim Coon; Marty Snider

=== Radio ===
PRN covered their final 2023 broadcast, which was also simulcast on Sirius XM NASCAR Radio. Doug Rice & Mark Garrow covered the action for PRN when the field races down the front straightaway. Nick Yeoman covered the action for PRN from a platform outside of Turns 1 & 2, & Pat Patterson covered the action from a platform outside of Turns 3 & 4 for PRN. Heather DeBeaux, Brett McMillan, Brad Gillie and Wendy Venturini had the call from pit lane for PRN.

PRN
Booth announcers	Turn announcers	Pit reporters
Lead announcer: Doug Rice; Announcer: Mark Garrow	Turns 1 & 2: Nick Yeoman; Turns 3 & 4: Pat Patterson	Heather DeBeaux; Brett McMillan; Brad Gillie; Wendy Venturini

== Standings after the race ==
Drivers' Championship standings

	Pos	Driver	Points
3	1	Kyle Larson	4,084
1	2	William Byron	4,077 (–7)
1	3	Martin Truex Jr.	4,070 (–14)
1	4	Denny Hamlin	4,070 (–14)
1	5	Christopher Bell	4,068 (–16)
1	6	Tyler Reddick	4,054 (–30)
1	7	Ryan Blaney	4,053 (–31)
3	8	Chris Buescher	4,047 (–37)
	9	Brad Keselowski	2,239 (–1,845)
	10	Ross Chastain	2,213 (–1,871)
1	11	Kyle Busch	2,191 (–1,893)
1	12	Bubba Wallace	2,185 (–1,899)
	13	Joey Logano	2,168 (–1,916)
	14	Kevin Harvick	2,144 (–1,940)
1	15	Michael McDowell	2,130 (–1,954)
1	16	Ricky Stenhouse Jr.	2,126 (–1,958)
Official driver's standings

Manufacturers' Championship standings

Pos	Manufacturer	Points
1	Chevrolet	1,225
2	Toyota	1,144 (–81)
3	Ford	1.130 (–95)

- Note: Only the first 16 positions are included for the driver standings.

== Notes ==
Previous race: 2023 Bank of America Roval 400	NASCAR Cup Series; 2023 season	Next race: 2023 4EVER 400
