= 2023 Bank of America Roval 400 =

NASCAR Cup Series race

Race details
- Race 32 of 36 in the 2023 NASCAR Cup Series
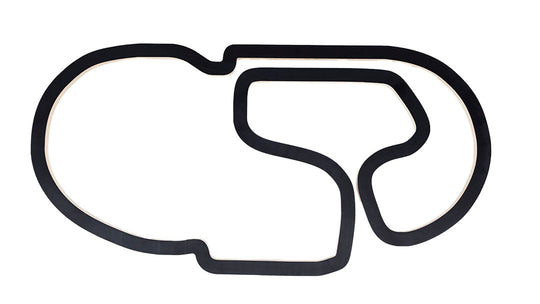
- Roval (2018–2023)
- Date: October 8, 2023
- Location: Charlotte Motor Speedway in Concord, North Carolina
- Course: Permanent racing facility
- Course length: 2.280 miles (3.669 km)
- Distance: 109 laps, 248.52 mi (400 km)
- Average speed: 81.596 miles per hour (131.316 km/h)

Pole position
Driver	Tyler Reddick	23XI Racing
- Time: 1:21.214

Most laps led
Driver	A. J. Allmendinger	Kaulig Racing
- Laps: 46

Winner
No. 16	A. J. Allmendinger	Kaulig Racing

Television in the United States
- Network: NBC
- Announcers: Rick Allen, Jeff Burton and Steve Letarte

Radio in the United States
- Radio: PRN
- Booth announcers: Doug Rice and Mark Garrow
- Turn announcers: Nick Yeoman (1, 2 & 3), Mike Jaynes (4, 5 & 6), Doug Turnbull (7, 8 & 9), Pat Patterson (10, 11 & 12) and Rob Albright (13, 14 & 15)

The 2023 Bank of America Roval 400 was a NASCAR Cup Series race that was held on October 8, 2023, at Charlotte Motor Speedway in Concord, North Carolina. It was contested over 109 laps on the 2.28-mile (3.67 km) road course. It was the 32nd race of the 2023 NASCAR Cup Series season, the sixth race of the Playoffs, and final race of the Round of 12. It was won by A. J. Allmendinger. This was the last race with the old roval configuration, as Charlotte Motor Speedway announced before the 2024 Coca-Cola 600 that the roval would get a redesign for 2024.

== Report ==
=== Background ===
An aerial view of Charlotte Motor Speedway

Since 2018, deviating from past NASCAR events at Charlotte, the race will utilize a road course configuration of Charlotte Motor Speedway, promoted and trademarked as the "Roval". The course is 2.28 miles (3.67 km) in length and features 17 turns, utilizing the infield road course and portions of the oval track. The race will be contested over a scheduled distance of 109 laps, 400 kilometres (250 mi).

During July 2018 tests on the road course, concerns were raised over drivers "cheating" the backstretch chicane on the course. The chicanes were modified with additional tire barriers and rumble strips in order to encourage drivers to properly drive through them, and NASCAR will enforce drive-through penalties on drivers who illegally "short-cut" parts of the course. The chicanes will not be used during restarts. In the summer of 2019, the bus stop on the backstretch was changed and deepened, becoming a permanent part of the circuit, compared to the previous year where it was improvised.

If a driver fails to legally make the backstretch bus stop, the driver must skip the frontstretch chicane and make a complete stop by the dotted line on the exit before being allowed to continue. A driver who misses the frontstretch chicane must stop before the exit.

==== Entry list ====
- (R) denotes rookie driver.
- (i) denotes driver who is ineligible for series driver points.
- (P) denotes playoff driver.
- (OP) denotes owner’s playoffs car.

No.	Driver	Team	Manufacturer
1	Ross Chastain (P)	Trackhouse Racing	Chevrolet
2	Austin Cindric	Team Penske	Ford
3	Austin Dillon	Richard Childress Racing	Chevrolet
4	Kevin Harvick	Stewart-Haas Racing	Ford
5	Kyle Larson (P)	Hendrick Motorsports	Chevrolet
6	Brad Keselowski (P)	RFK Racing	Ford
7	Corey LaJoie	Spire Motorsports	Chevrolet
8	Kyle Busch (P)	Richard Childress Racing	Chevrolet
9	Chase Elliott (OP)	Hendrick Motorsports	Chevrolet
10	Aric Almirola	Stewart-Haas Racing	Ford
11	Denny Hamlin (P)	Joe Gibbs Racing	Toyota
12	Ryan Blaney (P)	Team Penske	Ford
14	Chase Briscoe	Stewart-Haas Racing	Ford
15	Andy Lally (i)	Rick Ware Racing	Ford
16	A. J. Allmendinger	Kaulig Racing	Chevrolet
17	Chris Buescher (P)	RFK Racing	Ford
19	Martin Truex Jr. (P)	Joe Gibbs Racing	Toyota
20	Christopher Bell (P)	Joe Gibbs Racing	Toyota
21	Harrison Burton	Wood Brothers Racing	Ford
22	Joey Logano	Team Penske	Ford
23	Bubba Wallace (P)	23XI Racing	Toyota
24	William Byron (P)	Hendrick Motorsports	Chevrolet
31	Justin Haley	Kaulig Racing	Chevrolet
34	Michael McDowell	Front Row Motorsports	Ford
38	Zane Smith (i)	Front Row Motorsports	Ford
41	Ryan Preece	Stewart-Haas Racing	Ford
42	Mike Rockenfeller	Legacy Motor Club	Chevrolet
43	Erik Jones	Legacy Motor Club	Chevrolet
45	Tyler Reddick (P)	23XI Racing	Toyota
47	Ricky Stenhouse Jr.	JTG Daugherty Racing	Chevrolet
48	Alex Bowman	Hendrick Motorsports	Chevrolet
51	Todd Gilliland	Rick Ware Racing	Ford
54	Ty Gibbs (R)	Joe Gibbs Racing	Toyota
62	Austin Hill (i)	Beard Motorsports	Chevrolet
77	Ty Dillon	Spire Motorsports	Chevrolet
78	Josh Bilicki (i)	Live Fast Motorsports	Chevrolet
99	Daniel Suárez	Trackhouse Racing	Chevrolet
Official entry list

== Practice ==
Bubba Wallace was the fastest in the practice session with a time of 1:21.646 seconds and a speed of 102.295 mph (164.628 km/h).

=== Practice results ===
Pos	No.	Driver	Team	Manufacturer	Time	Speed
1	23	Bubba Wallace (P)	23XI Racing	Toyota	1:21.646	102.295
2	45	Tyler Reddick (P)	23XI Racing	Toyota	1:21.714	102.210
3	14	Chase Briscoe	Stewart-Haas Racing	Ford	1:21.833	102.062
Official practice results

== Qualifying ==
Tyler Reddick scored the pole for the race with a time of 1:21.214 and a speed of 102.839 mph (165.503 km/h).

=== Qualifying results ===
Pos	No.	Driver	Team	Manufacturer	R1	R2
1	45	Tyler Reddick (P)	23XI Racing	Toyota	1:20.925	1:21.214
2	20	Christopher Bell (P)	Joe Gibbs Racing	Toyota	1:21.186	1:21.328
3	99	Daniel Suárez	Trackhouse Racing	Chevrolet	1:21.341	1:21.401
4	23	Bubba Wallace (P)	23XI Racing	Toyota	1:21.167	1:21.428
5	8	Kyle Busch (P)	Richard Childress Racing	Chevrolet	1:20.964	1:21.488
6	16	A. J. Allmendinger	Kaulig Racing	Chevrolet	1:20.856	1:21.600
7	22	Joey Logano	Team Penske	Ford	1:21.384	1:21.720
8	9	Chase Elliott (OP)	Hendrick Motorsports	Chevrolet	1:20.897	1:21.722
9	11	Denny Hamlin (P)	Joe Gibbs Racing	Toyota	1:21.023	0.000
10	54	Ty Gibbs (R)	Joe Gibbs Racing	Toyota	1:21.159	0.000
11	19	Martin Truex Jr. (P)	Joe Gibbs Racing	Toyota	1:21.178	—
12	1	Ross Chastain (P)	Trackhouse Racing	Chevrolet	1:21.221	—
13	34	Michael McDowell	Front Row Motorsports	Ford	1:21.399	—
14	24	William Byron (P)	Hendrick Motorsports	Chevrolet	1:21.608	—
15	3	Austin Dillon	Richard Childress Racing	Chevrolet	1:21.611	—
16	48	Alex Bowman	Hendrick Motorsports	Chevrolet	1:21.632	—
17	12	Ryan Blaney (P)	Team Penske	Ford	1:21.659	—
18	41	Ryan Preece	Stewart-Haas Racing	Ford	1:21.702	—
19	6	Brad Keselowski (P)	RFK Racing	Ford	1:21.707	—
20	17	Chris Buescher (P)	RFK Racing	Ford	1:21.790	—
21	10	Aric Almirola	Stewart-Haas Racing	Ford	1:21.800	—
22	4	Kevin Harvick	Stewart-Haas Racing	Ford	1:21.892	—
23	43	Erik Jones	Legacy Motor Club	Chevrolet	1:21.970	—
24	7	Corey LaJoie	Spire Motorsports	Chevrolet	1:22.003	—
25	31	Justin Haley	Kaulig Racing	Chevrolet	1:22.024	—
26	42	Mike Rockenfeller	Legacy Motor Club	Chevrolet	1:22.036	—
27	78	Josh Bilicki (i)	Live Fast Motorsports	Chevrolet	1:22.086	—
28	2	Austin Cindric	Team Penske	Ford	1:22.103	—
29	14	Chase Briscoe	Stewart-Haas Racing	Ford	1:22.156	—
30	21	Harrison Burton	Wood Brothers Racing	Ford	1:22.184	—
31	51	Todd Gilliland	Rick Ware Racing	Ford	1:22.357	—
32	62	Austin Hill (i)	Beard Motorsports	Chevrolet	1:22.529	—
33	38	Zane Smith (i)	Front Row Motorsports	Ford	1:22.578	—
34	47	Ricky Stenhouse Jr.	JTG Daugherty Racing	Chevrolet	1:22.589	—
35	15	Andy Lally (i)	Rick Ware Racing	Ford	1:22.859	—
36	5	Kyle Larson (P)	Hendrick Motorsports	Chevrolet	0.000	—
37	77	Ty Dillon	Spire Motorsports	Chevrolet	0.000	—
Official qualifying results

== Race ==
The race was won by A. J. Allmendinger after there were five restarts following caution periods in the final thirty-one laps. This marked Allmendinger’s third career Cup Series victory, as well as the second Cup Series victory for Kaulig Racing.

=== Race results ===
==== Stage results ====
Stage One Laps: 25

Pos	No	Driver	Team	Manufacturer	Points
1	45	Tyler Reddick (P)	23XI Racing	Toyota	10
2	23	Bubba Wallace (P)	23XI Racing	Toyota	9
3	1	Ross Chastain (P)	Trackhouse Racing	Chevrolet	8
4	19	Martin Truex Jr. (P)	Joe Gibbs Racing	Toyota	7
5	20	Christopher Bell (P)	Joe Gibbs Racing	Toyota	6
6	99	Daniel Suárez	Trackhouse Racing	Chevrolet	5
7	9	Chase Elliott (OP)	Hendrick Motorsports	Chevrolet	4
8	8	Kyle Busch (P)	Richard Childress Racing	Chevrolet	3
9	54	Ty Gibbs (R)	Joe Gibbs Racing	Toyota	2
10	16	A. J. Allmendinger	Kaulig Racing	Chevrolet	1
Official stage one results

Stage Two Laps: 25

Pos	No	Driver	Team	Manufacturer	Points
1	9	Chase Elliott (OP)	Hendrick Motorsports	Chevrolet	10
2	20	Christopher Bell (P)	Joe Gibbs Racing	Toyota	9
3	11	Denny Hamlin (P)	Joe Gibbs Racing	Toyota	8
4	45	Tyler Reddick (P)	23XI Racing	Toyota	7
5	5	Kyle Larson (P)	Hendrick Motorsports	Chevrolet	6
6	1	Ross Chastain (P)	Trackhouse Racing	Chevrolet	5
7	23	Bubba Wallace (P)	23XI Racing	Toyota	4
8	19	Martin Truex Jr. (P)	Joe Gibbs Racing	Toyota	3
9	34	Michael McDowell	Front Row Motorsports	Ford	2
10	8	Kyle Busch (P)	Richard Childress Racing	Chevrolet	1
Official stage two results

=== Final Stage results ===
Stage Three Laps: 59

Pos	Grid	No	Driver	Team	Manufacturer	Laps	Points
1	6	16	A. J. Allmendinger	Kaulig Racing	Chevrolet	109	41
2	14	24	William Byron (P)	Hendrick Motorsports	Chevrolet	109	35
3	5	8	Kyle Busch (P)	Richard Childress Racing	Chevrolet	109	38
4	10	54	Ty Gibbs (R)	Joe Gibbs Racing	Toyota	109	35
5	7	22	Joey Logano	Team Penske	Ford	109	32
6	1	45	Tyler Reddick (P)	23XI Racing	Toyota	109	48
7	20	17	Chris Buescher (P)	RFK Racing	Ford	109	30
8	16	48	Alex Bowman	Hendrick Motorsports	Chevrolet	109	29
9	8	9	Chase Elliott (OP)	Hendrick Motorsports	Chevrolet	109	42
10	12	1	Ross Chastain (P)	Trackhouse Racing	Chevrolet	109	40
11	18	41	Ryan Preece	Stewart-Haas Racing	Ford	109	26
12	17	12	Ryan Blaney (P)	Team Penske	Ford	109	25
13	36	5	Kyle Larson (P)	Hendrick Motorsports	Chevrolet	109	30
14	15	3	Austin Dillon	Richard Childress Racing	Chevrolet	109	23
15	2	20	Christopher Bell (P)	Joe Gibbs Racing	Toyota	109	37
16	4	23	Bubba Wallace (P)	23XI Racing	Toyota	109	34
17	24	7	Corey LaJoie	Spire Motorsports	Chevrolet	109	20
18	19	6	Brad Keselowski (P)	RFK Racing	Ford	109	19
19	22	4	Kevin Harvick	Stewart-Haas Racing	Ford	109	18
20	11	19	Martin Truex Jr. (P)	Joe Gibbs Racing	Toyota	109	27
21	21	10	Aric Almirola	Stewart-Haas Racing	Ford	109	16
22	25	31	Justin Haley	Kaulig Racing	Chevrolet	109	15
23	31	51	Todd Gilliland	Rick Ware Racing	Ford	109	14
24	30	21	Harrison Burton	Wood Brothers Racing	Ford	109	13
25	28	2	Austin Cindric	Team Penske	Ford	109	12
26	27	78	Josh Bilicki (i)	Live Fast Motorsports	Chevrolet	109	0
27	32	62	Austin Hill (i)	Beard Motorsports	Chevrolet	109	0
28	29	14	Chase Briscoe	Stewart-Haas Racing	Ford	109	9
29	26	42	Mike Rockenfeller	Legacy Motor Club	Chevrolet	109	8
30	33	38	Zane Smith (i)	Front Row Motorsports	Ford	109	0
31	37	77	Ty Dillon	Spire Motorsports	Chevrolet	109	6
32	13	34	Michael McDowell	Front Row Motorsports	Ford	109	7
33	3	99	Daniel Suárez	Trackhouse Racing	Chevrolet	109	9
34	34	47	Ricky Stenhouse Jr.	JTG Daugherty Racing	Chevrolet	96	3
35	35	15	Andy Lally (i)	Rick Ware Racing	Ford	84	0
36	23	43	Erik Jones	Legacy Motor Club	Chevrolet	79	1
37	9	11	Denny Hamlin (P)	Joe Gibbs Racing	Toyota	76	9
Official race results

=== Race statistics ===
- Lead changes: 7 among 6 different drivers
- Cautions/Laps: 7 for 18 laps
- Red flags: 0
- Time of race: 3 hours, 5 minutes, and 57 seconds
- Average speed: 81.596 miles per hour (131.316 km/h)

== Media ==
=== Television ===
NBC Sports covered the race on the television side. Rick Allen, Jeff Burton and Steve Letarte called the race from the broadcast booth, Dale Earnhardt Jr was due to call the race with them but was absent from a fever. Dave Burns, Kim Coon and Marty Snider handled the pit road duties from pit lane.

NBC
Booth announcers	Pit reporters
Lap-by-lap: Rick Allen; Color-commentator: Jeff Burton; Color-commentator: Steve Letarte	Dave Burns; Kim Coon; Marty Snider

=== Radio ===
The Performance Racing Network had the radio call for the race, which was also simulcasted on Sirius XM NASCAR Radio. Doug Rice and Mark Garrow called the race from the booth when the field raced down the front straightaway. IMS Radio's Nick Yeoman was assigned the entrance to the road course and into the Bank of America bridge (Turns 1–3). Voice of the Indianapolis 500 Mark Jaynes was assigned the action from the Bank of America bridge to the middle of the infield section. Doug Turnbull called the action exiting in infield into the oval Turn 1 banking (Turns 7–9). Pat Patterson called the action on the backstretch and into the bus stop. Rob Albright was assigned to the oval Turn 3-4 end. (Turns 13–15). Brad Gillie, Brett McMillan, Alan Cavanna, and Wendy Venturini had the call from the pit area for PRN.

PRN
Booth announcers	Turn announcers	Pit reporters
Lead announcer: Doug Rice; Announcer: Mark Garrow	Infield entrance: Nick Yeoman; Middle of Infield: Mark Jaynes; Exit of Infield: Doug Turnbull; Oval 2 to Bus Stop Pat Patterson; Oval 3/4: Rob Albright	Brad Gillie; Brett McMillan; Alan Cavanna; Wendy Venturini

== Standings after the race ==
Drivers' Championship standings

	Pos	Driver	Points
	1	William Byron	4,041
4	2	Martin Truex Jr.	4,036 (–5)
1	3	Denny Hamlin	4,032 (–9)
3	4	Kyle Larson	4,024 (–17)
	5	Chris Buescher	4,021 (–20)
3	6	Christopher Bell	4,016 (–25)
2	7	Tyler Reddick	4,016 (–25)
4	8	Ryan Blaney	4,014 (–27)
1	9	Brad Keselowski	2,192 (–1,849)
1	10	Ross Chastain	2,172 (–1,869)
1	11	Bubba Wallace	2,160 (–1,881)
	12	Kyle Busch	2,150 (–1,871)
	13	Joey Logano	2,143 (–1,898)
2	14	Kevin Harvick	2,121 (–1,920)
1	15	Ricky Stenhouse Jr.	2,114 (–1,927)
1	16	Michael McDowell	2,110 (–1,931)
Official driver's standings

Manufacturers' Championship standings

Pos	Manufacturer	Points
1	Chevrolet	1,185
2	Toyota	1,109 (–76)
3	Ford	1,097 (–88)

- Note: Only the first 16 positions are included for the driver standings.

Previous race: 2023 YellaWood 500	NASCAR Cup Series; 2023 season	Next race: 2023 South Point 400
