= 2026 Autotrader 400 =

Race details
- Race 2 of 36 in the 2026 NASCAR Cup Series
- Date: February 22, 2026
- Location: EchoPark Speedway in Hampton, Georgia
- Course: Permanent racing facility
- Course length: 1.54 miles (2.48 km)
- Distance: 271 laps, 417.34 mi (672.08 km)
- Scheduled distance: 260 laps, 400.4 mi (644.4 km)
- Weather: Sunny with a temperature around 48 °F (9 °C); wind out of the northwest at 20 miles per hour (32 km/h).
- Average speed: 117.865 miles per hour (189.685 km/h)

Pole position
Driver	Tyler Reddick	23XI Racing
- Grid positions set by competition-based formula

Most laps led
Driver	Tyler Reddick	23XI Racing
- Laps: 53

Fastest lap
Driver	Cole Custer	Haas Factory Team
- Time: 29.715

Winner
No. 45	Tyler Reddick	23XI Racing

Television in the United States
- Network: Fox
- Announcers: Mike Joy, Clint Bowyer, and Kevin Harvick
- Nielsen ratings: 4.487 million

Radio in the United States
- Radio: PRN
- Booth announcers: Brad Gillie and Nick Yeoman
- Turn announcers: Doug Turnbull (1 & 2) and Jack Johnson (3 & 4)

The 2026 Autotrader 400 was a NASCAR Cup Series race held on February 22, 2026, at EchoPark Speedway in Hampton, Georgia. Contested over 271 laps on the 1.54-mile-long (2.48 km) asphalt quad-oval intermediate speedway (with superspeedway rules), extended from the original 260 laps due to a overtime finish, it was the second race of the 2026 NASCAR Cup Series season.

Tyler Reddick won the race. Chase Briscoe finished 2nd, and Ross Chastain finished 3rd. Carson Hocevar and Daniel Suárez rounded out the top five, and Shane van Gisbergen, Zane Smith, Bubba Wallace, Ryan Preece, and Ryan Blaney rounded out the top ten.

== Report ==
=== Background ===
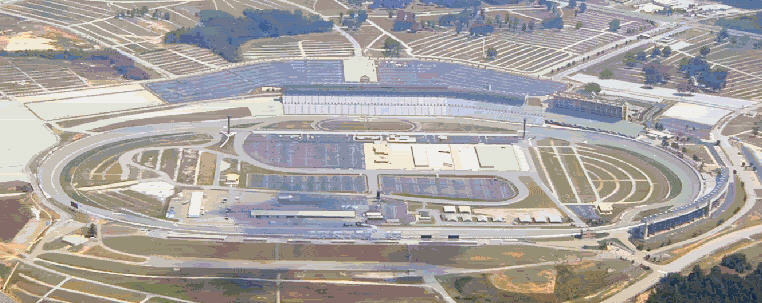
EchoPark Speedway, the track where the race was held.

EchoPark Speedway (commonly referred to as Atlanta Motor Speedway) is a 1.54-mile race track in Hampton, Georgia, United States, 20 miles (32 km) south of Atlanta. It has annually hosted NASCAR Xfinity Series stock car races since 1992.

The venue was bought by Speedway Motorsports in 1990. In 1994, 46 condominiums were built over the northeastern side of the track. In 1997, to standardize the track with Speedway Motorsports' other two intermediate ovals, the entire track was almost completely rebuilt. The frontstretch and backstretch were swapped, and the configuration of the track was changed from oval to quad-oval, with a new official length of 1.54-mile (2.48 km) where before it was 1.522-mile (2.449 km). The project made the track one of the fastest on the NASCAR circuit. In July 2021 NASCAR announced that the track would be reprofiled for the 2022 season to have 28 degrees of banking and would be narrowed from 55 to 40 feet which the track claims will turn racing at the track similar to restrictor plate superspeedways. Despite the reprofiling being criticized by drivers, construction began in August 2021 and wrapped up in December 2021. The track has seating capacity of 71,000 to 125,000 people depending on the tracks configuration.

On June 3, 2025, SMI announced the track's renaming to EchoPark Speedway under a new seven-year sponsorship deal with the Smith family-owned business, EchoPark. The renaming ended a 35-year stint under the Atlanta Motor Speedway name.

On August 20, 2025, when the schedule was unveiled, Autotrader was announced as the title sponsor for EchoPark's spring race, replacing Ambetter Health.

==== Entry list ====
- (R) denotes rookie driver.
- (i) denotes driver who is ineligible for series driver points.

No.	Driver	Team	Manufacturer
1	Ross Chastain	Trackhouse Racing	Chevrolet
2	Austin Cindric	Team Penske	Ford
3	Austin Dillon	Richard Childress Racing	Chevrolet
4	Noah Gragson	Front Row Motorsports	Ford
5	Kyle Larson	Hendrick Motorsports	Chevrolet
6	Brad Keselowski	RFK Racing	Ford
7	Daniel Suárez	Spire Motorsports	Chevrolet
8	Kyle Busch	Richard Childress Racing	Chevrolet
9	Chase Elliott	Hendrick Motorsports	Chevrolet
10	Ty Dillon	Kaulig Racing	Chevrolet
11	Denny Hamlin	Joe Gibbs Racing	Toyota
12	Ryan Blaney	Team Penske	Ford
16	A. J. Allmendinger	Kaulig Racing	Chevrolet
17	Chris Buescher	RFK Racing	Ford
19	Chase Briscoe	Joe Gibbs Racing	Toyota
20	Christopher Bell	Joe Gibbs Racing	Toyota
21	Josh Berry	Wood Brothers Racing	Ford
22	Joey Logano	Team Penske	Ford
23	Bubba Wallace	23XI Racing	Toyota
24	William Byron	Hendrick Motorsports	Chevrolet
34	Todd Gilliland	Front Row Motorsports	Ford
35	Riley Herbst	23XI Racing	Toyota
38	Zane Smith	Front Row Motorsports	Ford
41	Cole Custer	Haas Factory Team	Chevrolet
42	John Hunter Nemechek	Legacy Motor Club	Toyota
43	Erik Jones	Legacy Motor Club	Toyota
44	J. J. Yeley (i)	NY Racing Team	Chevrolet
45	Tyler Reddick	23XI Racing	Toyota
47	Ricky Stenhouse Jr.	Hyak Motorsports	Chevrolet
48	Alex Bowman	Hendrick Motorsports	Chevrolet
51	Cody Ware	Rick Ware Racing	Chevrolet
54	Ty Gibbs	Joe Gibbs Racing	Toyota
60	Ryan Preece	RFK Racing	Ford
71	Michael McDowell	Spire Motorsports	Chevrolet
77	Carson Hocevar	Spire Motorsports	Chevrolet
78	B. J. McLeod	Live Fast Motorsports	Chevrolet
88	Connor Zilisch (R)	Trackhouse Racing	Chevrolet
97	Shane van Gisbergen	Trackhouse Racing	Chevrolet
Official entry list

== Qualifying ==
Qualifying for the race was canceled due to inclement weather. Tyler Reddick was awarded the pole for the race as a result of NASCAR's pandemic formula with a score of 1.000.

=== Starting lineup ===
Pos	No.	Driver	Team	Manufacturer
1	45	Tyler Reddick	23XI Racing	Toyota
2	22	Joey Logano	Team Penske	Ford
3	47	Ricky Stenhouse Jr.	Hyak Motorsports	Chevrolet
4	9	Chase Elliott	Hendrick Motorsports	Chevrolet
5	6	Brad Keselowski	RFK Racing	Ford
6	38	Zane Smith	Front Row Motorsports	Ford
7	17	Chris Buescher	RFK Racing	Ford
8	35	Riley Herbst	23XI Racing	Toyota
9	23	Bubba Wallace	23XI Racing	Toyota
10	21	Josh Berry	Wood Brothers Racing	Ford
11	4	Noah Gragson	Front Row Motorsports	Ford
12	7	Daniel Suárez	Spire Motorsports	Chevrolet
13	24	William Byron	Hendrick Motorsports	Chevrolet
14	8	Kyle Busch	Richard Childress Racing	Chevrolet
15	77	Carson Hocevar	Spire Motorsports	Chevrolet
16	5	Kyle Larson	Hendrick Motorsports	Chevrolet
17	10	Ty Dillon	Kaulig Racing	Chevrolet
18	51	Cody Ware	Rick Ware Racing	Chevrolet
19	16	A. J. Allmendinger	Kaulig Racing	Chevrolet
20	71	Michael McDowell	Spire Motorsports	Chevrolet
21	1	Ross Chastain	Trackhouse Racing	Chevrolet
22	12	Ryan Blaney	Team Penske	Ford
23	43	Erik Jones	Legacy Motor Club	Toyota
24	42	John Hunter Nemechek	Legacy Motor Club	Toyota
25	54	Ty Gibbs	Joe Gibbs Racing	Toyota
26	60	Ryan Preece	RFK Racing	Ford
27	41	Cole Custer	Haas Factory Team	Chevrolet
28	97	Shane van Gisbergen	Trackhouse Racing	Chevrolet
29	11	Denny Hamlin	Joe Gibbs Racing	Toyota
30	2	Austin Cindric	Team Penske	Ford
31	88	Connor Zilisch (R)	Trackhouse Racing	Chevrolet
32	20	Christopher Bell	Joe Gibbs Racing	Toyota
33	3	Austin Dillon	Richard Childress Racing	Chevrolet
34	19	Chase Briscoe	Joe Gibbs Racing	Toyota
35	34	Todd Gilliland	Front Row Motorsports	Ford
36	48	Alex Bowman	Hendrick Motorsports	Chevrolet
37	78	B. J. McLeod	Live Fast Motorsports	Chevrolet
38	44	J. J. Yeley (i)	NY Racing Team	Chevrolet
Official starting lineup

== Race ==
=== Race results ===
==== Stage Results ====
Stage One Laps: 60

Pos	No	Driver	Team	Manufacturer	Points
1	2	Austin Cindric	Team Penske	Ford	10
2	23	Bubba Wallace	23XI Racing	Toyota	9
3	5	Kyle Larson	Hendrick Motorsports	Chevrolet	8
4	24	William Byron	Hendrick Motorsports	Chevrolet	7
5	9	Chase Elliott	Hendrick Motorsports	Chevrolet	6
6	45	Tyler Reddick	23XI Racing	Toyota	5
7	8	Kyle Busch	Richard Childress Racing	Chevrolet	4
8	22	Joey Logano	Team Penske	Ford	3
9	88	Connor Zilisch (R)	Trackhouse Racing	Chevrolet	2
10	12	Ryan Blaney	Team Penske	Ford	1

Stage Two Laps: 100

Pos	No	Driver	Team	Manufacturer	Points
1	23	Bubba Wallace	23XI Racing	Toyota	10
2	24	William Byron	Hendrick Motorsports	Chevrolet	9
3	19	Chase Briscoe	Joe Gibbs Racing	Toyota	8
4	45	Tyler Reddick	23XI Racing	Toyota	7
5	9	Chase Elliott	Hendrick Motorsports	Chevrolet	6
6	77	Carson Hocevar	Spire Motorsports	Chevrolet	5
7	60	Ryan Preece	RFK Racing	Ford	4
8	12	Ryan Blaney	Team Penske	Ford	3
9	6	Brad Keselowski	RFK Racing	Ford	2
10	97	Shane van Gisbergen	Trackhouse Racing	Chevrolet	1

=== Final Stage Results ===
Stage Three Laps: 100

Pos	Grid	No	Driver	Team	Manufacturer	Laps	Points
1	1	45	Tyler Reddick	23XI Racing	Toyota	271	67
2	34	19	Chase Briscoe	Joe Gibbs Racing	Toyota	271	43
3	21	1	Ross Chastain	Trackhouse Racing	Chevrolet	271	34
4	15	77	Carson Hocevar	Spire Motorsports	Chevrolet	271	38
5	12	7	Daniel Suárez	Spire Motorsports	Chevrolet	271	32
6	28	97	Shane van Gisbergen	Trackhouse Racing	Chevrolet	271	32
7	6	38	Zane Smith	Front Row Motorsports	Ford	271	30
8	9	23	Bubba Wallace	23XI Racing	Toyota	271	48
9	26	60	Ryan Preece	RFK Racing	Ford	271	32
10	22	12	Ryan Blaney	Team Penske	Ford	271	31
11	4	9	Chase Elliott	Hendrick Motorsports	Chevrolet	271	38
12	19	16	A. J. Allmendinger	Kaulig Racing	Chevrolet	271	25
13	29	11	Denny Hamlin	Joe Gibbs Racing	Toyota	271	24
14	11	4	Noah Gragson	Front Row Motorsports	Ford	271	23
15	7	17	Chris Buescher	RFK Racing	Ford	271	22
16	17	10	Ty Dillon	Kaulig Racing	Chevrolet	271	21
17	5	6	Brad Keselowski	RFK Racing	Ford	271	22
18	2	22	Joey Logano	Team Penske	Ford	271	22
19	24	42	John Hunter Nemechek	Legacy Motor Club	Toyota	271	18
20	20	71	Michael McDowell	Spire Motorsports	Chevrolet	271	17
21	32	20	Christopher Bell	Joe Gibbs Racing	Toyota	271	16
22	27	41	Cole Custer	Haas Factory Team	Chevrolet	270	16
23	36	48	Alex Bowman	Hendrick Motorsports	Chevrolet	269	14
24	23	43	Erik Jones	Legacy Motor Club	Toyota	269	13
25	35	34	Todd Gilliland	Front Row Motorsports	Ford	258	12
26	30	2	Austin Cindric	Team Penske	Ford	257	21
27	18	51	Cody Ware	Rick Ware Racing	Chevrolet	257	10
28	13	24	William Byron	Hendrick Motorsports	Chevrolet	256	25
29	33	3	Austin Dillon	Richard Childress Racing	Chevrolet	256	8
30	31	88	Connor Zilisch (R)	Trackhouse Racing	Chevrolet	223	9
31	38	44	J. J. Yeley (i)	NY Racing Team	Chevrolet	220	0
32	16	5	Kyle Larson	Hendrick Motorsports	Chevrolet	160	13
33	8	35	Riley Herbst	23XI Racing	Toyota	157	4
34	14	8	Kyle Busch	Richard Childress Racing	Chevrolet	124	7
35	37	78	B. J. McLeod	Live Fast Motorsports	Chevrolet	111	2
36	3	47	Ricky Stenhouse Jr.	Hyak Motorsports	Chevrolet	103	1
37	25	54	Ty Gibbs	Joe Gibbs Racing	Toyota	81	1
38	10	21	Josh Berry	Wood Brothers Racing	Ford	81	1
Official race results

=== Race statistics ===
- Lead changes: 57 among 14 different drivers
- Cautions/Laps: 10 for 67 laps
- Red flags: 1 for 10 minutes and 31 seconds
- Time of race: 3 hours, 32 minutes and 27 seconds
- Average speed: 117.865 miles per hour (189.685 km/h)

== Media ==
=== Television ===
NASCAR on Fox carried the race in the United States. Mike Joy, Clint Bowyer, and three-time Atlanta winner Kevin Harvick called the race from the broadcast booth. Jamie Little, Regan Smith, and Josh Sims handled pit road for the television side, and Larry McReynolds provided insight on-site during the race.

Fox
Booth announcers	Pit reporters	In-race analyst
Lap-by-lap: Mike Joy; Color-commentator: Clint Bowyer; Color-commentator: Kevin Harvick	Jamie Little; Regan Smith; Josh Sims	Larry McReynolds

=== Radio ===
The race was broadcast on radio by the Performance Racing Network and simulcast on Sirius XM NASCAR Radio. Brad Gillie and Nick Yeoman called the race from the booth when the field raced down the front stretch. Doug Turnbull called the race from atop a billboard outside of turn 2 when the field raced through turns 1 and 2, and Jack Johnson called the race from a billboard outside of turn 3 when the field raced through turns 3 and 4. On pit road, PRN was manned by Brett McMillan, Andrew Kurland and Wendy Venturini.

PRN
Booth announcers	Turn announcers	Pit reporters
Lead announcer: Brad Gillie; Announcer: Nick Yeoman	Turns 1 & 2: Doug Turnbull; Turns 3 & 4: Jack Johnson	Brett McMillan; Andrew Kurland; Wendy Venturini

== Standings after the race ==
Drivers' Championship standings

	Pos	Driver	Points
	1	Tyler Reddick	125
6	2	Bubba Wallace	85 (–40)
	3	Chase Elliott	81 (–44)
5	4	Carson Hocevar	74 (–51)
1	5	Zane Smith	71 (–54)
4	6	Joey Logano	68 (–57)
5	7	Daniel Suárez	67 (–58)
2	8	Ryan Blaney	67 (–58)
3	9	Brad Keselowski	61 (–64)
3	10	Chris Buescher	61 (–64)
12	11	Ross Chastain	52 (–73)
4	12	Noah Gragson	50 (–75)
5	13	William Byron	50 (–75)
10	14	Ryan Preece	49 (–76)
22	15	Chase Briscoe	45 (–80)
12	16	Shane van Gisbergen	44 (–81)
Official driver's standings

Manufacturers' Championship standings

Pos	Manufacturer	Points
1	Toyota	110
2	Chevrolet	69 (–41)
3	Ford	64 (–46)

- Note: Only the first 16 positions are included for the driver standings.

== See also ==
- 2026 Bennett Transportation & Logistics 250 (O'Reilly Auto Parts Series)
- 2026 Fr8 208 (Craftsman Truck Series)

Previous race: 2026 Daytona 500	NASCAR Cup Series; 2026 season	Next race: 2026 DuraMAX Texas Grand Prix
