= 2022 South Point 400 =

NASCAR Cup Series race

Race details
- Race 33 of 36 in the 2022 NASCAR Cup Series
- Date: October 16, 2022
- Location: Las Vegas Motor Speedway in Las Vegas
- Course: Permanent racing facility
- Course length: 1.5 miles (2.4 km)
- Distance: 267 laps, 400.5 mi (640.8 km)
- Average speed: 130.480 miles per hour (209.987 km/h)

Pole position
Driver	Tyler Reddick	Richard Childress Racing
- Time: 29.252

Most laps led
Driver	Ross Chastain	Trackhouse Racing Team
- Laps: 68

Winner
No. 22	Joey Logano	Team Penske

Television in the United States
- Network: NBC
- Announcers: Rick Allen, Jeff Burton, Steve Letarte and Dale Earnhardt Jr.

Radio in the United States
- Radio: PRN
- Booth announcers: Doug Rice and Mark Garrow
- Turn announcers: Nick Yeoman (1 & 2) and Pat Patterson (3 & 4)

The 2022 South Point 400 was a NASCAR Cup Series race held on October 16, 2022, at Las Vegas Motor Speedway in Las Vegas. Contested over 267 laps on the 1.5 mi (2.4 km) asphalt intermediate speedway, it was the 33rd race of the 2022 NASCAR Cup Series season, the seventh race of the Playoffs, and the first race of the Round of 8.

== Report ==
=== Background ===
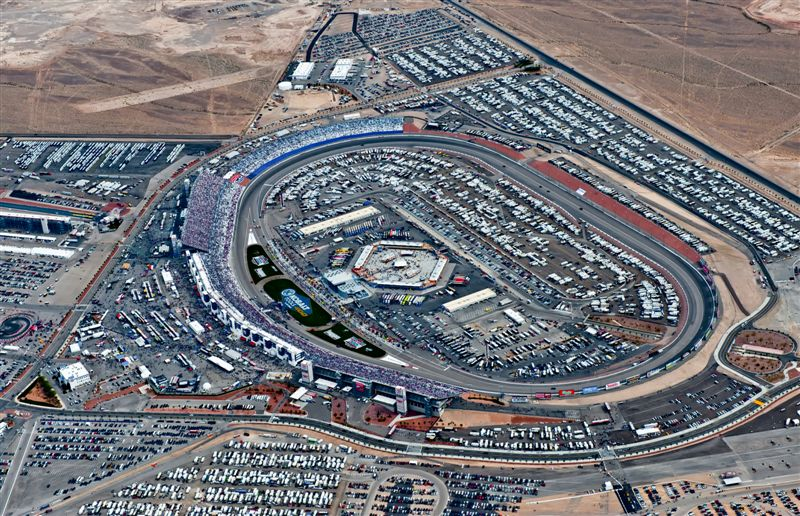
Las Vegas Motor Speedway, the track where the race was held.

Las Vegas Motor Speedway, located in Clark County, Nevada outside the Las Vegas city limits and about 15 miles northeast of the Las Vegas Strip, is a 1,200-acre (490 ha) complex of multiple tracks for motorsports racing. The complex is owned by Speedway Motorsports, Inc., which is headquartered in Charlotte, North Carolina.

==== Entry list ====
- (R) denotes rookie driver.
- (i) denotes driver who is ineligible for series driver points.

No.	Driver	Team	Manufacturer
1	Ross Chastain	Trackhouse Racing Team	Chevrolet
2	Austin Cindric (R)	Team Penske	Ford
3	Austin Dillon	Richard Childress Racing	Chevrolet
4	Kevin Harvick	Stewart-Haas Racing	Ford
5	Kyle Larson	Hendrick Motorsports	Chevrolet
6	Brad Keselowski	RFK Racing	Ford
7	Corey LaJoie	Spire Motorsports	Chevrolet
8	Tyler Reddick	Richard Childress Racing	Chevrolet
9	Chase Elliott	Hendrick Motorsports	Chevrolet
10	Aric Almirola	Stewart-Haas Racing	Ford
11	Denny Hamlin	Joe Gibbs Racing	Toyota
12	Ryan Blaney	Team Penske	Ford
14	Chase Briscoe	Stewart-Haas Racing	Ford
15	J. J. Yeley (i)	Rick Ware Racing	Ford
16	A. J. Allmendinger (i)	Kaulig Racing	Chevrolet
17	Chris Buescher	RFK Racing	Ford
18	Kyle Busch	Joe Gibbs Racing	Toyota
19	Martin Truex Jr.	Joe Gibbs Racing	Toyota
20	Christopher Bell	Joe Gibbs Racing	Toyota
21	Harrison Burton (R)	Wood Brothers Racing	Ford
22	Joey Logano	Team Penske	Ford
23	Ty Gibbs (i)	23XI Racing	Toyota
24	William Byron	Hendrick Motorsports	Chevrolet
31	Justin Haley	Kaulig Racing	Chevrolet
34	Michael McDowell	Front Row Motorsports	Ford
38	Todd Gilliland (R)	Front Row Motorsports	Ford
41	Cole Custer	Stewart-Haas Racing	Ford
42	Ty Dillon	Petty GMS Motorsports	Chevrolet
43	Erik Jones	Petty GMS Motorsports	Chevrolet
45	Bubba Wallace	23XI Racing	Toyota
47	Ricky Stenhouse Jr.	JTG Daugherty Racing	Chevrolet
48	Noah Gragson (i)	Hendrick Motorsports	Chevrolet
51	Cody Ware	Rick Ware Racing	Ford
77	Landon Cassill (i)	Spire Motorsports	Chevrolet
78	B. J. McLeod (i)	Live Fast Motorsports	Ford
99	Daniel Suárez	Trackhouse Racing Team	Chevrolet
Official entry list

== Practice ==
Ryan Blaney was the fastest in the practice session with a time of 29.425 seconds and a speed of 183.517 mph (295.342 km/h).

=== Practice results ===
Pos	No.	Driver	Team	Manufacturer	Time	Speed
1	12	Ryan Blaney	Team Penske	Ford	29.425	183.517
2	1	Ross Chastain	Trackhouse Racing Team	Chevrolet	29.452	183.349
3	43	Erik Jones	Petty GMS Motorsports	Chevrolet	29.453	183.343
Official practice results

== Qualifying ==
Tyler Reddick scored the pole for the race with a time of 29.252 and a speed of 184.603 mph (297.090 km/h).

=== Qualifying results ===
Pos	No.	Driver	Team	Manufacturer	R1	R2
1	8	Tyler Reddick	Richard Childress Racing	Chevrolet	29.321	29.252
2	2	Austin Cindric (R)	Team Penske	Ford	29.250	29.302
3	24	William Byron	Hendrick Motorsports	Chevrolet	29.353	29.344
4	12	Ryan Blaney	Team Penske	Ford	29.429	29.354
5	22	Joey Logano	Team Penske	Ford	29.447	29.400
6	99	Daniel Suárez	Trackhouse Racing Team	Chevrolet	29.598	29.469
7	20	Christopher Bell	Joe Gibbs Racing	Toyota	29.395	29.474
8	21	Harrison Burton (R)	Wood Brothers Racing	Ford	29.400	29.523
9	45	Bubba Wallace	23XI Racing	Toyota	29.588	29.665
10	3	Austin Dillon	Richard Childress Racing	Chevrolet	29.616	29.711
11	1	Ross Chastain	Trackhouse Racing Team	Chevrolet	29.468	—
12	17	Chris Buescher	RFK Racing	Ford	29.495	—
13	4	Kevin Harvick	Stewart-Haas Racing	Ford	29.509	—
14	5	Kyle Larson	Hendrick Motorsports	Chevrolet	29.509	—
15	34	Michael McDowell	Front Row Motorsports	Ford	29.606	—
16	14	Chase Briscoe	Stewart-Haas Racing	Ford	29.617	—
17	48	Noah Gragson (i)	Hendrick Motorsports	Chevrolet	29.626	—
18	18	Kyle Busch	Joe Gibbs Racing	Toyota	29.634	—
19	23	Ty Gibbs (i)	23XI Racing	Toyota	29.638	—
20	9	Chase Elliott	Hendrick Motorsports	Chevrolet	29.656	—
21	16	A. J. Allmendinger (i)	Kaulig Racing	Chevrolet	29.658	—
22	43	Erik Jones	Petty GMS Motorsports	Chevrolet	29.667	—
23	10	Aric Almirola	Stewart-Haas Racing	Ford	29.693	—
24	41	Cole Custer	Stewart-Haas Racing	Ford	29.720	—
25	6	Brad Keselowski	RFK Racing	Ford	29.743	—
26	15	J. J. Yeley (i)	Rick Ware Racing	Ford	29.847	—
27	19	Martin Truex Jr.	Joe Gibbs Racing	Toyota	29.857	—
28	31	Justin Haley	Kaulig Racing	Chevrolet	29.918	—
29	47	Ricky Stenhouse Jr.	JTG Daugherty Racing	Chevrolet	29.947	—
30	7	Corey LaJoie	Spire Motorsports	Chevrolet	29.982	—
31	11	Denny Hamlin	Joe Gibbs Racing	Toyota	30.001	—
32	77	Landon Cassill (i)	Spire Motorsports	Chevrolet	30.063	—
33	42	Ty Dillon	Petty GMS Motorsports	Chevrolet	30.307	—
34	51	Cody Ware	Rick Ware Racing	Ford	30.378	—
35	38	Todd Gilliland (R)	Front Row Motorsports	Ford	30.386	—
36	78	B. J. McLeod (i)	Live Fast Motorsports	Ford	30.581	—
Official qualifying results

== Race ==
=== Stage Results ===
Stage One Laps: 80

Pos	No	Driver	Team	Manufacturer	Points
1	45	Bubba Wallace	23XI Racing	Toyota	10
2	22	Joey Logano	Team Penske	Ford	9
3	99	Daniel Suárez	Trackhouse Racing Team	Chevrolet	8
4	20	Christopher Bell	Joe Gibbs Racing	Toyota	7
5	12	Ryan Blaney	Team Penske	Ford	6
6	2	Austin Cindric (R)	Team Penske	Ford	5
7	5	Kyle Larson	Hendrick Motorsports	Chevrolet	4
8	19	Martin Truex Jr.	Joe Gibbs Racing	Toyota	3
9	8	Tyler Reddick	Richard Childress Racing	Chevrolet	2
10	24	William Byron	Hendrick Motorsports	Chevrolet	1
Official stage one results

Stage Two Laps: 85

Pos	No	Driver	Team	Manufacturer	Points
1	12	Ryan Blaney	Team Penske	Ford	10
2	22	Joey Logano	Team Penske	Ford	9
3	99	Daniel Suárez	Trackhouse Racing Team	Chevrolet	8
4	1	Ross Chastain	Trackhouse Racing Team	Chevrolet	7
5	11	Denny Hamlin	Joe Gibbs Racing	Toyota	6
6	24	William Byron	Hendrick Motorsports	Chevrolet	5
7	4	Kevin Harvick	Stewart-Haas Racing	Ford	4
8	19	Martin Truex Jr.	Joe Gibbs Racing	Toyota	3
9	2	Austin Cindric (R)	Team Penske	Ford	2
10	18	Kyle Busch	Joe Gibbs Racing	Toyota	1
Official stage two results

=== Final Stage Results ===
Stage Three Laps: 102

Pos	Grid	No	Driver	Team	Manufacturer	Laps	Points
1	5	22	Joey Logano	Team Penske	Ford	267	58
2	11	1	Ross Chastain	Trackhouse Racing Team	Chevrolet	267	42
3	18	18	Kyle Busch	Joe Gibbs Racing	Toyota	267	35
4	16	14	Chase Briscoe	Stewart-Haas Racing	Ford	267	33
5	31	11	Denny Hamlin	Joe Gibbs Racing	Toyota	267	38
6	1	8	Tyler Reddick	Richard Childress Racing	Chevrolet	267	33
7	27	19	Martin Truex Jr.	Joe Gibbs Racing	Toyota	267	36
8	22	43	Erik Jones	Petty GMS Motorsports	Chevrolet	267	29
9	21	16	A. J. Allmendinger (i)	Kaulig Racing	Chevrolet	267	0
10	10	3	Austin Dillon	Richard Childress Racing	Chevrolet	267	27
11	17	48	Noah Gragson (i)	Hendrick Motorsports	Chevrolet	267	0
12	13	4	Kevin Harvick	Stewart-Haas Racing	Ford	267	29
13	3	24	William Byron	Hendrick Motorsports	Chevrolet	267	30
14	28	31	Justin Haley	Kaulig Racing	Chevrolet	267	23
15	12	17	Chris Buescher	RFK Racing	Ford	267	22
16	6	99	Daniel Suárez	Trackhouse Racing Team	Chevrolet	267	37
17	25	6	Brad Keselowski	RFK Racing	Ford	267	20
18	23	10	Aric Almirola	Stewart-Haas Racing	Ford	267	19
19	15	34	Michael McDowell	Front Row Motorsports	Ford	267	18
20	24	41	Cole Custer	Stewart-Haas Racing	Ford	267	17
21	20	9	Chase Elliott	Hendrick Motorsports	Chevrolet	267	16
22	19	23	Ty Gibbs (i)	23XI Racing	Toyota	267	0
23	29	47	Ricky Stenhouse Jr.	JTG Daugherty Racing	Chevrolet	267	14
24	30	7	Corey LaJoie	Spire Motorsports	Chevrolet	267	13
25	35	38	Todd Gilliland (R)	Front Row Motorsports	Ford	267	12
26	8	21	Harrison Burton (R)	Wood Brothers Racing	Ford	266	11
27	34	51	Cody Ware	Rick Ware Racing	Ford	264	10
28	4	12	Ryan Blaney	Team Penske	Ford	260	25
29	2	2	Austin Cindric (R)	Team Penske	Ford	259	15
30	36	78	B. J. McLeod (i)	Live Fast Motorsports	Ford	256	0
31	26	15	J. J. Yeley (i)	Rick Ware Racing	Ford	253	0
32	32	77	Landon Cassill (i)	Spire Motorsports	Chevrolet	246	0
33	33	42	Ty Dillon	Petty GMS Motorsports	Chevrolet	237	4
34	7	20	Christopher Bell	Joe Gibbs Racing	Toyota	94	10
35	14	5	Kyle Larson	Hendrick Motorsports	Chevrolet	94	6
36	9	45	Bubba Wallace	23XI Racing	Toyota	94	11
Official race results

=== Race statistics ===
- Lead changes: 18 among 11 different drivers
- Cautions/Laps: 8 for 42 laps
- Red flags: 0
- Time of race: 3 hours, 4 minutes and 10 seconds
- Average speed: 130.480 miles per hour (209.987 km/h)

=== Penalties ===
On October 18, NASCAR handed Bubba Wallace a one-race suspension for an intentional retaliatory right-rear hook collision against Kyle Larson that collected playoff contender Christopher Bell and resulted in physical confrontation between Wallace and Larson. Wallace was the first driver since Matt Kenseth in 2015 (as a result of intentionally crashing into Joey Logano at that year's Martinsville playoff race) to be parked by NASCAR for on-track conduct; John Hunter Nemechek replaced Wallace for the Dixie Vodka 400.

== Media ==
=== Television ===
NBC Sports covered the race on the television side. Rick Allen, Jeff Burton, Steve Letarte and Dale Earnhardt Jr. called the race from the broadcast booth. Dave Burns, Parker Kligerman and Marty Snider handled the pit road duties from pit lane.

NBC
Booth announcers	Pit reporters
Lap-by-lap: Rick Allen; Color-commentator: Jeff Burton; Color-commentator: Steve Letarte; Color-commentator: Dale Earnhardt Jr.	Dave Burns; Parker Kligerman; Marty Snider

=== Radio ===
The Performance Racing Network covered their final 2022 broadcast, which was also simulcast on Sirius XM NASCAR Radio. Doug Rice and Mark Garrow called the race from the booth when the field raced through the tri-oval. Nick Yeoman called the race from a billboard in turn 2, as he noted, at the Dan Wheldon memorial plaque when the field raced through turns 1 and 2 & Pat Patterson called the race from a billboard outside of turn 3 when the field raced through turns 3 and 4. Heather Debeaux, Brett McMillan, Brad Gillie and Wendy Venturini handled the duties on pit lane.

PRN
Booth announcers	Turn announcers	Pit reporters
Lead announcer: Doug Rice; Announcer: Mark Garrow	Turns 1 & 2: Nick Yeoman; Turns 3 & 4: Pat Patterson	Heather DeBeaux; Brett McMillan; Brad Gillie; Wendy Venturini

== Standings after the race ==
Drivers' Championship standings

	Pos	Driver	Points
1	1	Joey Logano	4,084
1	2	Ross Chastain	4,063 (–21)
2	3	Chase Elliott	4,062 (–22)
3	4	Denny Hamlin	4,051 (–33)
1	5	William Byron	4,045 (–39)
2	6	Chase Briscoe	4,042 (–42)
2	7	Ryan Blaney	4,040 (–44)
4	8	Christopher Bell	4,028 (–56)
	9	Kyle Larson	2,206 (–1,878)
	10	Daniel Suárez	2,199 (–1,885)
1	11	Tyler Reddick	2,186 (–1,898)
1	12	Austin Cindric	2,169 (–1,915)
	13	Austin Dillon	2,161 (–1,923)
	14	Kyle Busch	2,158 (–1,926)
	15	Alex Bowman	2,104 (–1,980)
	16	Kevin Harvick	2,035 (–2,049)
Official driver's standings

Manufacturers' Championship standings

Pos	Manufacturer	Points
1	Chevrolet	1,215
2	Ford	1,144 (–71)
3	Toyota	1,087 (–128)

- Note: Only the first 16 positions are included for the driver standings.

Previous race: 2022 Bank of America Roval 400	NASCAR Cup Series; 2022 season	Next race: 2022 Dixie Vodka 400
