= Live Fast Motorsports =

NASCAR team

- Owner(s): B. J. McLeod; Joe Falk
- Principal: Jessica McLeod (CEO)
- Base: Mooresville, North Carolina
- Series: NASCAR Cup Series
- Race drivers: 78. B. J. McLeod, Daniel Dye, Katherine Legge (part-time)
- Manufacturer: Chevrolet
- Opened: 2020
- Website: teamlivefast.com

Career
- Debut: 2021 Daytona 500 (Daytona)
- Latest race: 2026 YellaWood 500 (Talladega)
- Races competed: 134
- Drivers' Championships: 0
- Race victories: 0
- Pole positions: 0

Live Fast Motorsports is an American professional stock car racing team that currently competes part-time in the NASCAR Cup Series. It is owned by B. J. McLeod and Joe Falk. The team currently fields the No. 78 Chevrolet Camaro ZL1 for driver/owner McLeod and Daniel Dye, in a technical alliance with Richard Childress Racing.

== History ==
=== Car No. 78 history ===
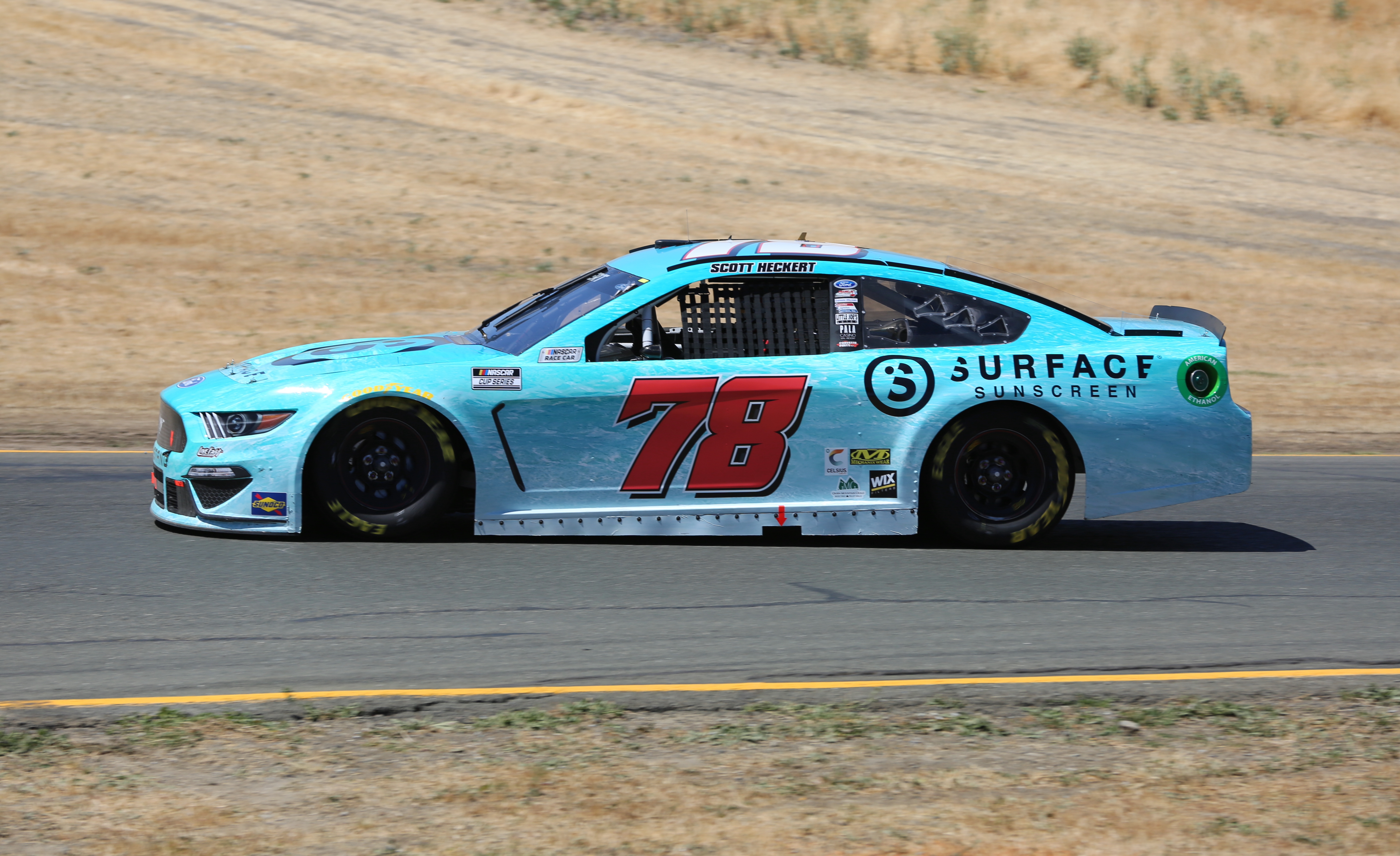
Scott Heckert in the No. 78 at Sonoma Raceway in 2021

On May 13, 2020, B. J. McLeod announced that his team, B. J. McLeod Motorsports, would be running part-time in the Cup Series with him as the driver. On October 23, 2020, it was announced that McLeod and Matt Tifft had teamed up with Joe Falk to acquire the charter from Go Fas Racing. Tifft was a former Cup Series driver who had to put his racing career on hold due to health issues in 2019. On November 20, 2020, the team announced its name, Live Fast Motorsports, and would continue to use the number 78. Although McLeod's primary manufacturer was Chevrolet in 2020, they were running Fords in the Cup Series.

The No. 78 started the 2021 season with McLeod finishing 23rd at the 2021 Daytona 500. He scored the team's first top-10 with a ninth place finish at the Daytona night race. Scott Heckert drove the No. 78 at the Daytona road course (28th), Sonoma (26th), and the Charlotte Roval (31st). Dirt racer Shane Golobic drove the car to a 37th finish at the Bristol dirt race. British racer Kyle Tilley drove the No. 78 at COTA (31st), Road America (35th), and Watkins Glen (30th). Andy Lally finished 39th at the Indianapolis road course after Tilley was sidelined with a shoulder injury prior to the race. The No. 78 finished the season 32nd in points.

McLeod started the 2022 season with a 27th place finish at the 2022 Daytona 500. Lally finished 39th at COTA while Josh Williams finished 25th at the Bristol dirt race. Crew chief Lee Leslie was suspended for four races after McLeod lost a wheel during the Talladega race. Team engineer Christopher Stanley was announced as McLeod's crew chief for Dover. McLeod finished a career best seventh at the rain-delayed Daytona summer race. The No. 78 finished the season 36th in points.

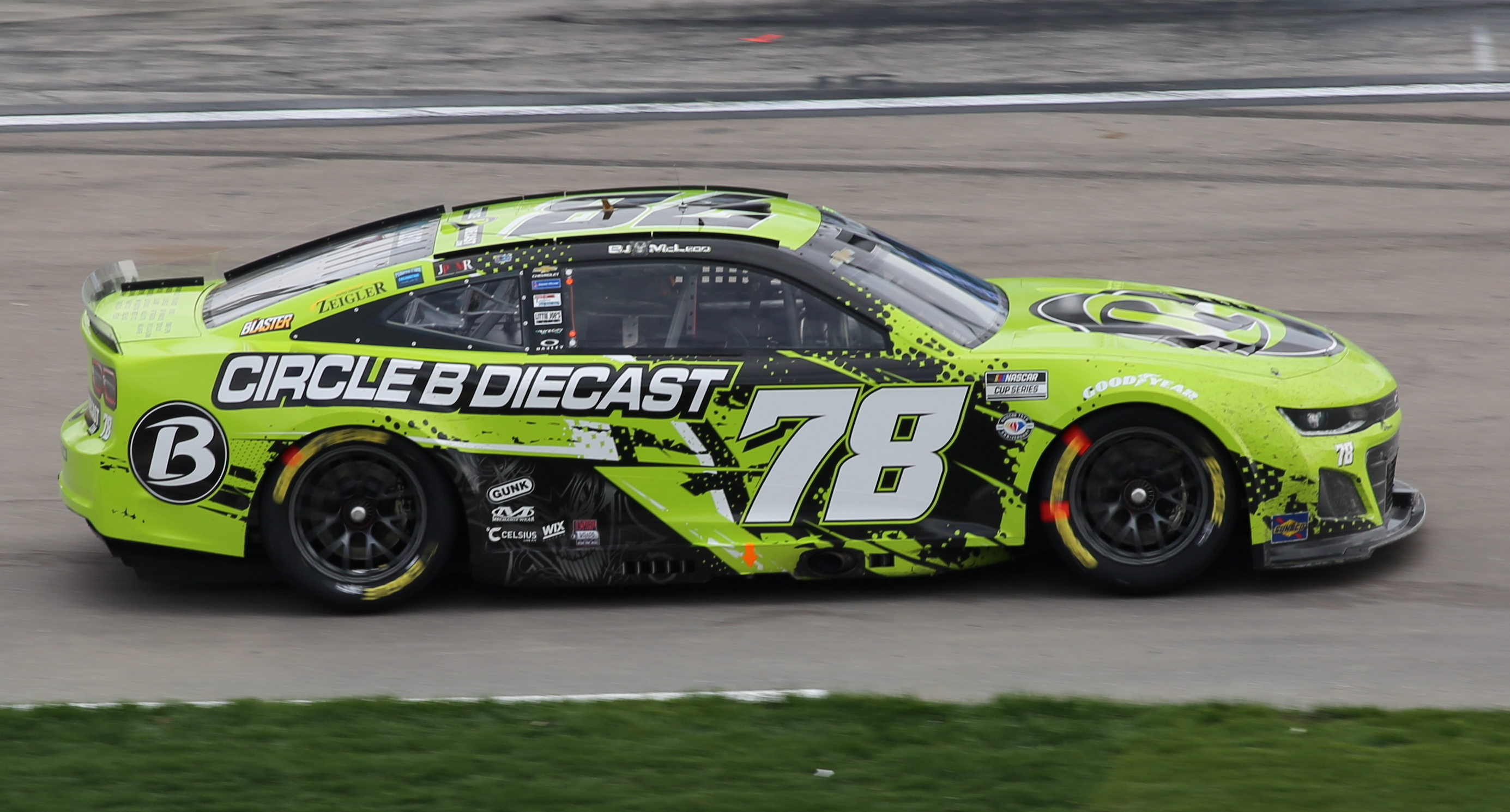
B. J. McLeod in the No. 78 car at Las Vegas Motor Speedway in 2023

On December 1, 2022, the team announced that it would be switching from Ford to Chevrolet for the 2023 NASCAR Cup Series season. McLeod started the season with a 30th place finish at the 2023 Daytona 500. Josh Bilicki drove the car to a 26th place finish at COTA. Anthony Alfredo drove the car at Richmond and Martinsville Sheldon Creed drove the No. 78 at Kansas to a 29th place finish. The team finished 36th in the final points standings for a second year in a row.

On September 16, 2023, Live Fast Motorsports sold its charter to Spire Motorsports for US$40 million. It was announced in November that Tifft would step away from the team to pursue other opportunities.

For the 2024 season, McLeod attempted to run the 2024 Daytona 500, but failed to make the race after finishing fourteenth in Duel 2 of the 2024 Bluegreen Vacations Duels. He ran a total of five races in 2024 and the No. 78 car finished 39th in the points standings. On December 19, LFM announced the team will run all six superspeedway races and the Coca-Cola 600 in 2025.

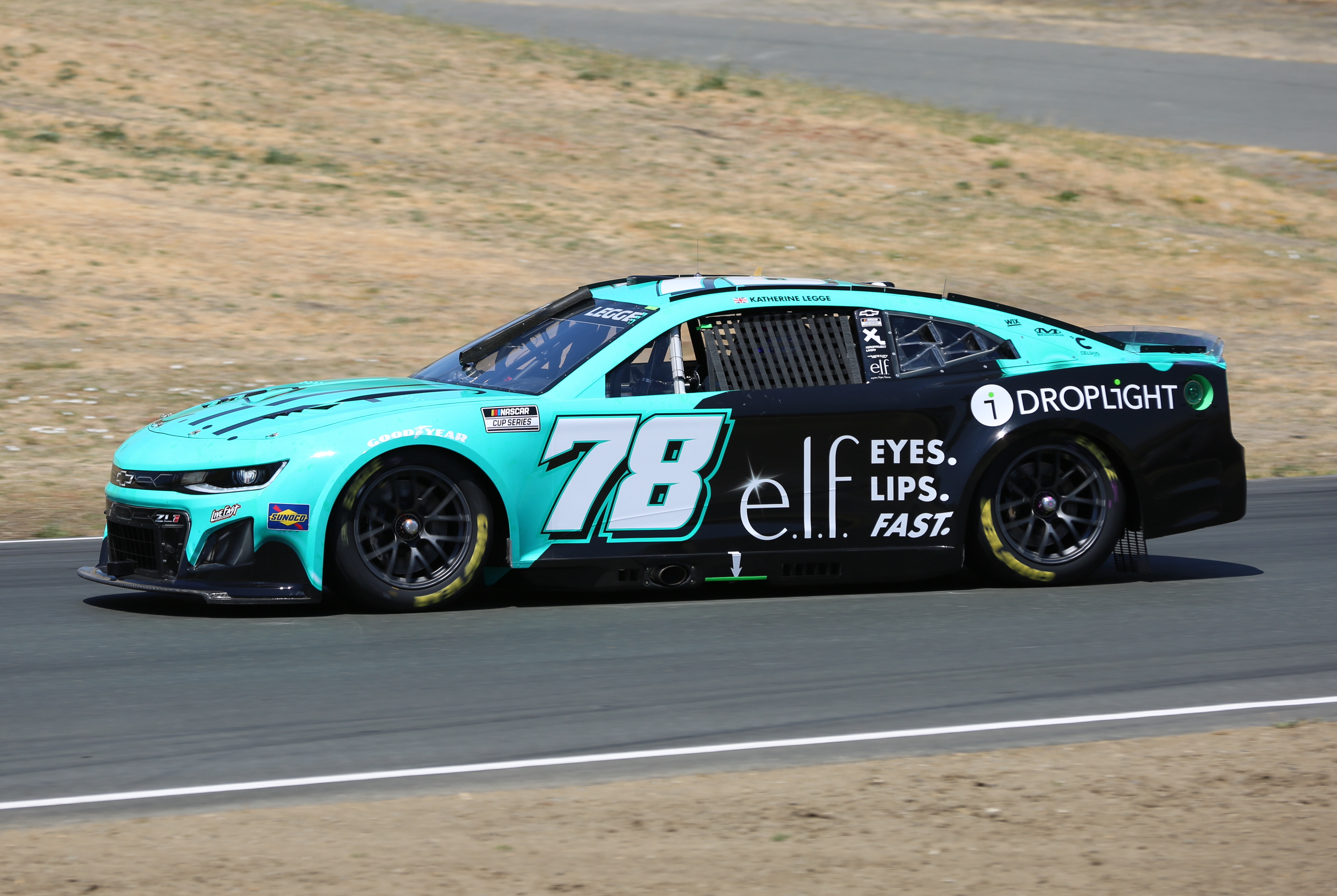
Katherine Legge in 2025

During the 2025 season, McLeod failed to qualify for the 2025 Daytona 500. On March 3, the team announced that Katherine Legge would drive the No. 78 car in her Cup Series debut at Phoenix.

In 2026, McLeod qualified the team for its fourth appearance in the Daytona 500 and first since 2023 by advancing through the Daytona Duels. The team secured its starting position following the disqualification of Beard Motorsports driver Anthony Alfredo, who had originally finished ahead of McLeod in the qualifying race. On April 20, it was announced that Daniel Dye would run four Cup Series races in the No. 78 car, beginning with the race at Talladega.

==== Car No. 78 results ====
Year	Driver	No.	Make	1	2	3	4	5	6	7	8	9	10	11	12	13	14	15	16	17	18	19	20	21	22	23	24	25	26	27	28	29	30	31	32	33	34	35	36	Owners	Pts
2021	B. J. McLeod	78	Ford	DAY; 23		HOM; 34	LVS; 30	PHO; 30	ATL; 34		MAR; 29	RCH; 32	TAL; 25	KAN; 31	DAR; 32	DOV; 36		CLT; 31		NSH; 28	POC; 30	POC; 29		ATL; 30	NHA; 30			MCH; 28	DAY; 9	DAR; 27	RCH; 30	BRI; 37	LVS; 33	TAL; 30		TEX; 22	KAN; 30	MAR; 29	PHO; 27	32nd	267
2021	Scott Heckert	78	Ford		DRC; 28														SON; 26																ROV; 31					32nd	267
2021	Shane Golobic	78	Ford							BRD; 37																														32nd	267
2021	Kyle Tilley	78	Ford														COA; 31						ROA; 35			GLN; 30														32nd	267
2021	Andy Lally	78	Ford																								IRC; 39													32nd	267
2022	B. J. McLeod	78	Ford	DAY; 27	CAL; 22	LVS; 28	PHO; 33	ATL; 19		RCH; 34	MAR; 36		TAL; 26	DOV; 35	DAR; 32	KAN; 36	CLT; 19	GTW; 30		NSH; 32		ATL; 36	NHA; 36	POC; 30		MCH; 23	RCH; 33		DAY; 7	DAR; 29	KAN; 31	BRI; 24	TEX; 26	TAL; 33		LVS; 30	HOM; 33	MAR; 34	PHO; 31	36th	271
2022	Andy Lally	78	Ford						COA; 39																															36th	271
2022	Josh Williams	78	Ford									BRD; 25													IRC; 25										ROV; 31					36th	271
2022	Scott Heckert	78	Ford																SON; 33																					36th	271
2022	Kyle Tilley	78	Ford																		ROA; 30							GLN; 39												36th	271
2023	B. J. McLeod	78	Chevy	DAY; 30	CAL; 24	LVS; 32	PHO; 36	ATL; 36			BRD; 26		TAL; 18	DOV; 29		DAR; 32	CLT; 29	GTW; 27				ATL; 20	NHA; 31	POC; 32	RCH; 36				DAY; 23	DAR; 36		BRI; 31	TEX; 22	TAL; 29		LVS; 30		MAR; 36	PHO; 33	36th	258
2023	Josh Bilicki	78	Chevy						COA; 26						KAN; 33				SON; 30	NSH; 34	CSC; 23					MCH; 32	IRC; 32	GLN; 27							ROV; 26		HOM; 35			36th	258
2023	Anthony Alfredo	78	Chevy							RCH; 33		MAR; 35																												36th	258
2023	Sheldon Creed	78	Chevy																												KAN; 29									36th	258
2024	B. J. McLeod	78	Chevy	DAY; DNQ	ATL; 24	LVS	PHO	BRI	COA	RCH	MAR	TEX	TAL; 32	DOV	KAN	DAR	CLT	GTW	SON	IOW	NHA	NSH	CSC	POC	IND	RCH	MCH	DAY; 19	DAR	ATL; 25	GLN	BRI	KAN	TAL; 22	ROV	LVS	HOM	MAR	PHO	39th	63
2025	B. J. McLeod	78	Chevy	DAY; DNQ	ATL; 22	COA							TAL; 33	TEX	KAN	CLT	NSH	MCH			ATL; 16								DAY; 32	DAR	GTW	BRI	NHA	KAN	ROV		TAL; 28	MAR	PHO	37th	117
2025	Katherine Legge	78	Chevy				PHO; 30	LVS	HOM	MAR	DAR	BRI							MXC; 32	POC		CSC; 19	SON; 31	DOV	IND; 17	IOW	GLN; 36	RCH								LVS; 31				37th	117
2026	B. J. McLeod	78	Chevy	DAY; 41	ATL; 35	COA	PHO	LVS	DAR	MAR	BRI	KAN											ATL; 38	NWS																39th	54
2026	Daniel Dye	78	Chevy										TAL; 24	TEX					POC; 29	COR	SON	CHI			IND; 38	IOW	RCH	NHA	DAY; 29	DAR	GTW	BRI	KAN	LVS	CLT	PHO	TAL; 25	MAR	HOM	39th	54
2026	Katherine Legge	78	Chevy												GLN; 35	CLT; 31	NSH	MCH																						39th	54
