= Wendy Venturini =

American motorsport announcer

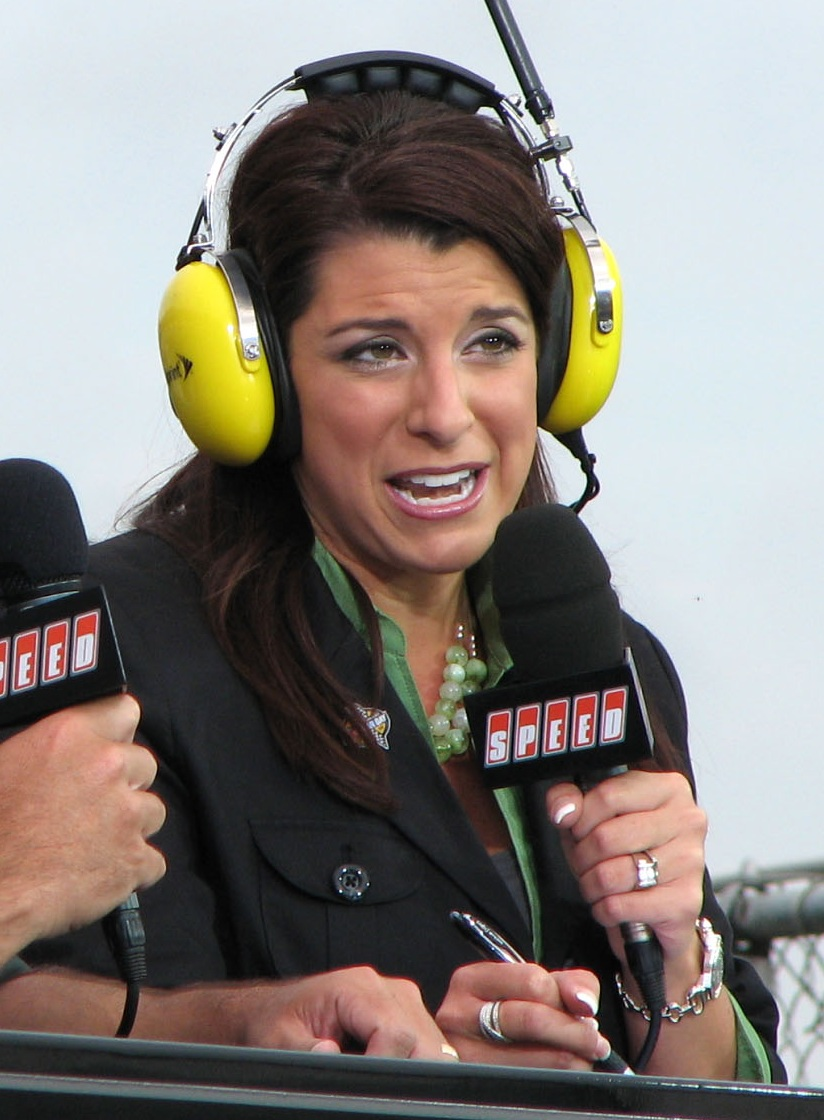
- Venturini in 2008
- Born: January 30, 1979 (age 47); Chicago, Illinois, U.S.
- Occupations: NASCAR reporter and analyst

Wendy Venturini (born January 30, 1979) is an American reporter for the Performance Racing Network (PRN). She works as broadcaster for NASCAR Cup Series races and sometimes as a pit reporter for races on PRN. She had been a pit reporter in the NASCAR Craftsman Truck Series, and reporter for NASCAR RaceDay. Venturini was born in Chicago, Illinois, and is a 2000 graduate of the University of North Carolina at Chapel Hill.

In 2007, Venturini was one of the commentators for DirecTV's NASCAR Hot Pass coverage, making her the first female play-by-play announcer in auto racing history.

On August 29, 2014, Venturini was announced as the anchor for the 2014 Sylvania 300 NASCAR Sprint Cup Series race for Performance Racing Network, becoming the first woman to serve such a position.

She is the daughter of two-time Automobile Racing Club of America (ARCA) Champion and multi-car owner Bill Venturini. Her older brother, Billy Venturini, is also a former owner on the ARCA circuit.

== Personal life ==
She was previously married to Jarrad Egert who serves as engine track support for Toyota Racing Development. They had their first child, Caleb James, on December 22, 2010.

On June 23, 2018, Venturini was struck by a vehicle while exercising near Sonoma Raceway in Northern California. She was transported to Marin General Hospital in Marin, California, where she was admitted to the intensive care unit. Doctors later diagnosed her with a skull fracture. Venturini returned to broadcasting in August of that same year.
