= NY Racing Team =

NASCAR team

- Owner: John Cohen
- Base: Statesville, North Carolina (April 2014); Dawsonville, Georgia (Early 2014)
- Series: NASCAR Cup Series
- Race drivers: 44. J. J. Yeley, Joey Gase, B. J. McLeod (part-time)
- Manufacturer: Chevrolet
- Opened: 2009
- Website: nyracingteam.com

Career
- Debut: Cup Series: 2012 AdvoCare 500 (Phoenix); Nationwide Series: 2009 Subway Jalapeño 250 (Daytona)
- Latest race: Cup Series: 2026 Season Finale 400 (Homestead); Nationwide Series: 2009 Able Body Labor 200 (Phoenix)
- Races competed: Total: 59; Cup Series: 52; Nationwide Series: 7
- Drivers' Championships: Total: 0 Cup Series: 0 Nationwide Series: 0
- Race victories: Total: 0 Cup Series: 0 Nationwide Series: 0
- Pole positions: Total: 0 Cup Series: 0 Nationwide Series: 0

NY Racing Team (formerly Xxxtreme Motorsport and Team Xtreme Racing) is an American professional stock car racing team in the NASCAR Cup Series. The team is owned by John Cohen, who is one of the few African-Americans to have owned a NASCAR team in a major touring series. They field the No. 44 Chevrolet Camaro ZL1 part-time for multiple drivers with car bodies supplied by Richard Childress Racing and engines by Hendrick Motorsports.

== Background ==
Johnathan "John" Cohen (born in 1975) is an African-American entrepreneur and team owner from New Jersey. Cohen began his business interests in nightclubs and taverns, before forming his race team, Xxxtreme Motorsport in the spring of 2009.

== NASCAR Cup Series ==
=== Car No. 7 history ===
==== 2018 ====
On May 21, 2018, it was announced the team would be returning to the Cup Series for the Coca-Cola 600 for the first time since 2015, receiving a multi-year deal with Steakhouse Elite as a sponsor. J. J. Yeley was announced to drive the No. 7 car in a partnership with Premium Motorsports. After qualifying 40th, Yeley finished 38th after suffering from fuel pump issues on lap 191. The following week at Pocono they fielded a car in association with Premium Motorsports. Yeley qualified the car 37th and finished 32nd. After missing several races, the team returned to the track for the Coke Zero Sugar 400 in collaboration with BK Racing. Yeley drove the Steakhouse Elite No. 23 to an eighteenth place finish after starting 40th. The following week at Kentucky they finished 38th. After skipping the New Hampshire race, the team finished 28th at Pocono after starting 33rd. After missing two more events, the team returned, in partnership with Premium, at Bristol. Yeley brought the No. 7 car home in 34th place. The team's collaboration with the No. 23 team continued after Front Row Motorsports' purchase of the No. 23 charter. Yeley drove the car to a seventeenth place finish at Las Vegas.

NY Racing continued its partnership with Front Row Motorsports after the purchase of BK's charter. During the autumn Talladega race, the No. 23 team switched manufacturers from Toyota to Ford before switching back to Toyota for the next two races. Yeley continued being the driver of the No. 23 Toyota for the rest of the season and during the final race at Homestead-Miami Speedway, BK Racing operated as a Ford Fusion. With BK Racing officially shutting down at season's end and being absorbed into Front Row Motorsports, NY Racing and Front Row Motorsports ended their partnership.

For 2019, NY Racing planned to run a No. 7 Steakhouse Elite Ford Mustang with Yeley as the driver, but they ended up never making an attempt.

==== Car No. 7 results ====
Year	Driver	No.	Make	1	2	3	4	5	6	7	8	9	10	11	12	13	14	15	16	17	18	19	20	21	22	23	24	25	26	27	28	29	30	31	32	33	34	35	36	Owners	Pts
2018	J. J. Yeley	7	Chevy	DAY	ATL	LVS	PHO	CAL	MAR	TEX	BRI	RCH	TAL	DOV	KAN	CLT; 38	POC	MCH	SON	CHI	DAY	KEN	NHA	POC	GLN	MCH	BRI	DAR	IND	LVS	RCH	CLT	DOV	TAL	KAN	MAR	TEX	PHO	HOM	47th	1

=== Car No. 30 history ===
==== 2014 ====
Before the 2014 Richmond spring race, the team purchased the owner points and assets of the recently defunct No. 30 from Swan Racing, including their race shop in Statesville, North Carolina, hoping to end their recent struggles in qualifying by having a solid points base. The team used No. 30 for Richmond due to NASCAR rules regarding ownership transfers, but switched back to the No. 44 thereafter.

==== Car No. 30 results ====
Year	Driver	No.	Make	1	2	3	4	5	6	7	8	9	10	11	12	13	14	15	16	17	18	19	20	21	22	23	24	25	26	27	28	29	30	31	32	33	34	35	36	Owners	Pts
2014	J. J. Yeley	30	Chevy	DAY	PHO	LVS	BRI	CAL	MAR	TEX	DAR	RCH; 40	TAL	KAN	CLT	DOV	POC	MCH	SON	KEN	DAY	NHA	IND	POC	GLN	MCH	BRI	ATL	RCH	CHI	NHA	DOV	KAN	CLT	TAL	MAR	TEX	PHO	HOM	44th	93

=== Car No. 44 history ===
==== 2012–2015 ====
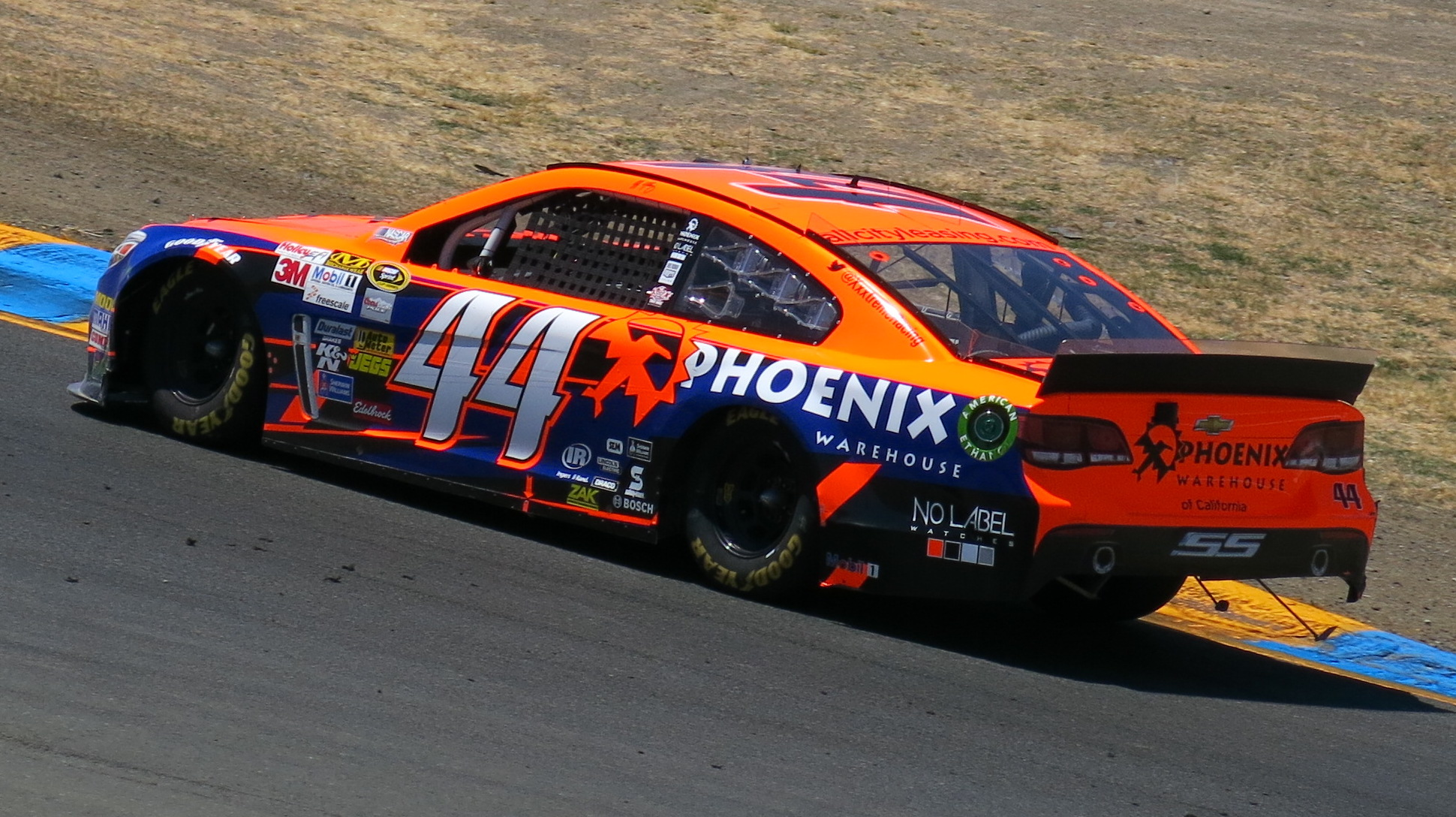
The 44 car driven by J. J. Yeley at Sonoma Raceway in 2014

The team returned from hiatus and began running the Cup Series in November 2012. A car numbered 44 for David Reutimann was fielded at the 2012 AdvoCare 500 at Phoenix International Raceway with sponsorship from No Label Watches. Reutimann finished 40th, pulling out of the race early due to a vibration.

For 2013, Scott Riggs was hired as the team's full-time driver and the team switched manufacturers from Chevrolet to Ford. The team attempted most races in the first half of the season, but following numerous instances of having to start and park, coupled with poor sponsorship, the team shut down for the year midseason, and Riggs moved to RBR Enterprises in the Camping World Truck Series.

In 2014, J. J. Yeley moved to the team following his departure from Tommy Baldwin Racing. The team struggled for speed early in the season, failing to qualify for two races and withdrawing from two others. The team qualified for Richmond after the field was set by the rulebook due to rain, but were running four laps down when the engine expired on lap 384. In May, after failing to qualify for the Aaron's 499 in the All City Leasing & Warehousing Chevrolet SS, the team qualified for the 5-hour Energy 400 on speed in the Phoenix Warehouse Chevrolet SS, starting the race in the 35th position. However, they once again suffered an engine failure, finishing 41st. They then missed the Coca-Cola 600, and blew their third engine at Dover. The next week at Pocono, despite cutting down a tire mid-race, they were able to stay on the track and complete a race for the first time in their existence, finishing 38th. An incident-free race the next week at Michigan brought the team's best finish to that point, 36th, which they then bested again at Sonoma with a 34th. The team then withdrew from Kentucky in the midst of more personnel shuffling. The team was absent for most of the summer, returning as "Team Xtreme Racing" in September for the AAA 400 at Dover, with Timmy Hill as driver. The team made the race, but lost an engine early into the event.

Former Tommy Baldwin Racing driver Reed Sorenson was signed by the team to compete in the 2015 Daytona 500 with Golden Corral sponsorship. Despite crashing on the final lap Sorenson was able to cross the start-finish line to record the team's first lead-lap finish, in 32nd place. Travis Kvapil was scheduled to drive the car in Atlanta, but they were forced to withdraw after the car, truck and hauler were stolen from a hotel parking lot. The race car and truck that was hauling the trailer were eventually recovered. The trailer and spare racing parts remained missing.

After Kvapil failed to qualify for the next three races, combined with Cohen facing his own civil arrest warrant for not answering an information subpoena, the team announced that they would withdraw from Martinsville in order to better prepare for Texas; however, they did not return to the series until 2022. On August 3, Jason Terry pleaded guilty in the theft of the Team Xtreme truck and trailer. Since then, the No. 44 became available and was later used by Richard Petty Motorsports for Brian Scott.

==== 2022 ====
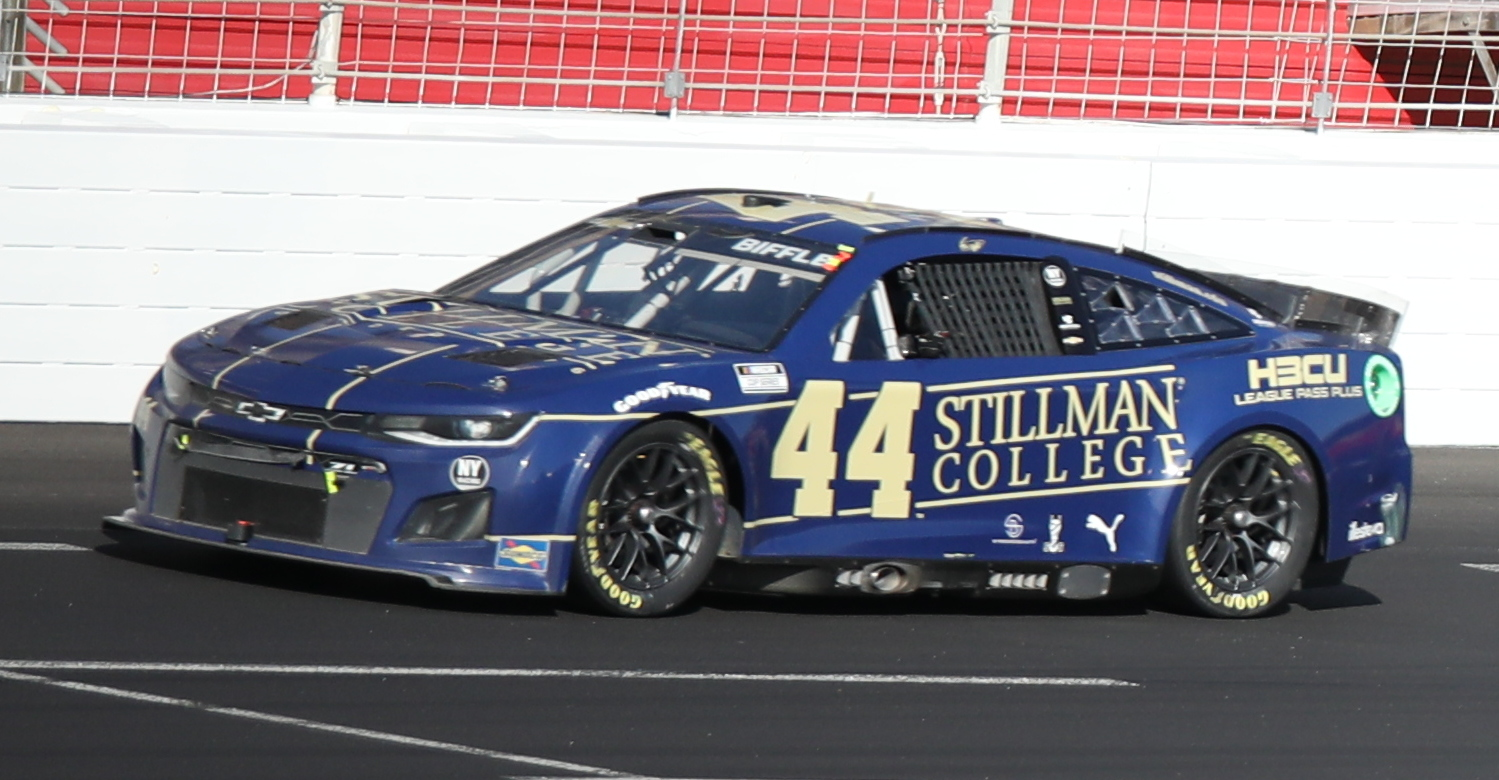
The 44 car driven by Greg Biffle at Atlanta Motor Speedway in 2022

In December 2020, the NY Racing Team posted "44" on their Instagram page, indicating their possible return to Cup. They would later say they would skip the Daytona 500. However, the team failed to show up to any races in the 2021 season.

In 2022, the NY Racing Team made their Cup Series return with Greg Biffle at the Daytona 500, marking the team's first race in four years and Biffle's first Cup race in six years. For this season, the team returned to Chevrolet, with primary sponsorship from various historically black colleges. The team finished the race in 36th place. The No. 44 also ran at Las Vegas and finished 34th. The team achieved their first top-twenty finish at Atlanta, finishing twentieth.

==== 2024 ====
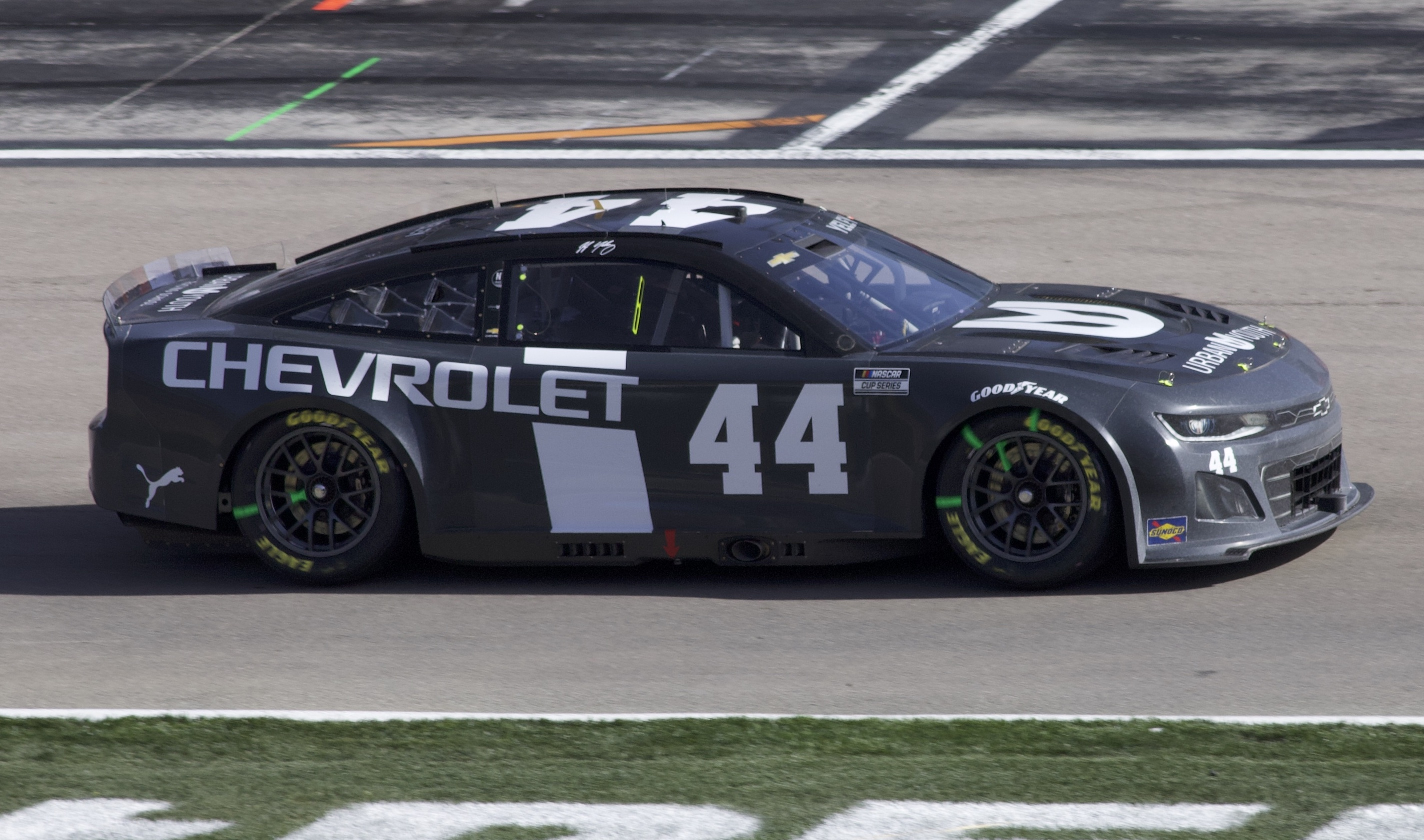
Yeley's No. 44 car at Las Vegas Motor Speedway in 2024

After not attempting any races during the 2023 season, the No. 44 attempted to run the 2024 Daytona 500 with J. J. Yeley but failed to make the race after finishing 16th in Duel 1 of the 2024 Bluegreen Vacations Duels. Greg Biffle, the team's driver in 2022, announced he would not race with the team in the future due to "unfulfilled contract obligations", despite his name appearing on the team's hauler entering the Daytona 500. Yeley then ran the car at Las Vegas, Charlotte, and Pocono, with a 34th place finish at Las Vegas being their top finish during that period. He would later run in the summer Atlanta race, finishing 23rd, his best finish of the year.

Joey Gase would be hired to drive the No. 44 car for the 2024 Coke Zero Sugar 400. Despite qualifying 39th and losing the draft early on, he would end up finishing the race twentieth, tying with the team's best finish at Atlanta in 2022.

==== 2025 ====
For the 2025 season, the No. 44 car raced part-time with J. J. Yeley, Derek Kraus, and Brennan Poole. Yeley failed to qualify for the 2025 Daytona 500 with J. J. Yeley after finishing 17th in Duel 1 of the 2025 The Duel at Daytona. At Pocono, the No. 44 car driven by Poole failed pre-race inspection three times.

==== Car No. 44 results ====
Year	Driver	No.	Make	1	2	3	4	5	6	7	8	9	10	11	12	13	14	15	16	17	18	19	20	21	22	23	24	25	26	27	28	29	30	31	32	33	34	35	36	Owners	Pts
2012	David Reutimann	44	Ford	DAY	PHO	LVS	BRI	CAL	MAR	TEX	KAN	RCH	TAL	DAR	CLT	DOV	POC	MCH	SON	KEN	DAY	NHA	IND	POC	GLN	MCH	BRI	ATL	RCH	CHI	NHA	DOV	TAL	CLT	KAN	MAR	TEX	PHO; 40	HOM	56th	4
2013	Scott Riggs	44	Ford	DAY	PHO; 43	LVS	BRI; DNQ	CAL; 41	MAR; 42	TEX; DNQ	KAN	RCH	TAL	DAR	CLT	DOV; 43	POC; 41	MCH; DNQ	SON	KEN; 43	DAY	NHA	IND	POC	GLN	MCH	BRI	ATL	RCH	CHI	NHA	DOV	KAN	CLT	TAL	MAR	TEX	PHO	HOM	47th	10
2014	J. J. Yeley	44	Chevy	DAY	PHO	LVS; DNQ	BRI; Wth	CAL	MAR	TEX; DNQ	DAR; Wth	RCH	TAL; DNQ	KAN; 41	CLT; DNQ	DOV; 39	POC; 38	MCH; 36	SON; 34	KEN	DAY	NHA	IND	POC	GLN	MCH	BRI	ATL	RCH	CHI	NHA									44th	93
2014	Timmy Hill	44	Chevy																													DOV; 43	KAN	CLT	TAL	MAR; 42	TEX	PHO	HOM	44th	93
2015	Reed Sorenson	44	Chevy	DAY; 32																																				47th	12
2015	Travis Kvapil	44	Chevy		ATL; Wth	LVS; DNQ	PHO; DNQ	CAL; DNQ	MAR; Wth	TEX	BRI	RCH	TAL	KAN	CLT	DOV	POC	MCH	SON	DAY	KEN	NHA	IND	POC	GLN	MCH	BRI	DAR	RCH	CHI	NHA	DOV	CLT	KAN	TAL	MAR	TEX	PHO	HOM	47th	12
2022	Greg Biffle	44	Chevy	DAY; 36	CAL	LVS; 34	PHO	ATL; 20	COA	RCH; 37	MAR	BRI	TAL; 35	DOV	DAR	KAN	CLT	GTW	SON	NSH	ROA	ATL	NHA	POC	IND	MCH	RCH	GLN	DAY	DAR	KAN	BRI	TEX	TAL	CLT	LVS	HOM	MAR	PHO	40th	24
2024	J. J. Yeley	44	Chevy	DAY; DNQ	ATL	LVS; 34	PHO	BRI	COA	RCH	MAR	TEX	TAL	DOV	KAN	DAR	CLT; 40	GTW	SON	IOW	NHA	NSH	CSC	POC; 35	IND	RCH	MCH			ATL; 23	GLN	BRI	KAN; 37	TAL; 27	ROV	LVS	HOM; 38	MAR	PHO; 35	42nd	51
2024	Joey Gase	44	Chevy																									DAY; 20	DAR											42nd	51
2025	J. J. Yeley	44	Chevy	DAY; DNQ	ATL; 37	COA	PHO	LVS	HOM; 35	MAR	DAR; 38	BRI	TAL; 32	TEX	KAN		NSH; 34	MCH	MXC					DOV; 34	IND	IOW	GLN; 38	RCH						KAN; 34	ROV	LVS; 30	TAL	MAR	PHO; 32	41st	49
2025	Derek Kraus	44	Chevy													CLT; 32														DAR; 36	GTW	BRI	NHA							41st	49
2025	Brennan Poole	44	Chevy																	POC; 34	ATL	CSC	SON																	41st	49
2025	Joey Gase	44	Chevy																										DAY; 28											41st	49
2026	J. J. Yeley	44	Chevy	DAY; DNQ	ATL; 31	COA	PHO	LVS	DAR	MAR	BRI	KAN						MCH; 21	POC	COR	SON	CHI; 35	ATL	NWS	IND	IOW	RCH	NHA											HOM; 36	40th	53
2026	Joey Gase	44	Chevy										TAL; 30	TEX	GLN	CLT	NSH												DAY; 36	DAR	GTW	BRI	KAN	LVS			TAL; 21	MAR		40th	53
2026	B. J. McLeod	44	Chevy																																CLT; 33	PHO				40th	53

== Nationwide Series ==
=== Car No. 07 history ===
The team debuted in the Xfinity Series during the 2009 season, running part-time with sponsorship from Macy's and Cavi Clothing sharing the owner points with SKI Motorsports. The No. 07 car debuted at Daytona in July with Chase Austin behind the wheel, the team returned at IRP, Bristol and Atlanta.

==== Car No. 07 results ====
Year	Driver	No.	Make	1	2	3	4	5	6	7	8	9	10	11	12	13	14	15	16	17	18	19	20	21	22	23	24	25	26	27	28	29	30	31	32	33	34	35	Owners	Pts
2009	Chase Austin	07	Chevy	DAY	CAL	LVS	BRI	TEX	NSH	PHO	TAL	RCH	DAR	CLT	DOV	NSH	KEN	MLW	NHA	DAY; 37	CHI	GTY	IRP; 32	IOW	GLN	MCH	BRI; 36	CGV	ATL; 29	RCH	DOV	KAN	CAL	CLT	MEM	TEX	PHO	HOM		

=== Car No. 58 history ===
The team debuted in the Nationwide Series during the 2009 season, running the No. 58 part-time with sponsorship from Macy's and Cavi Clothing. Xxxtreme ran first at Daytona in July with Mike Harmon, followed by several runs with Josh Wise and Chase Austin during the second half of the season. The team temporarily shut down at the end of the season after Macy's and Cavi left the team and no sponsorship could be found for 2010.

==== Car No. 58 results ====
Year	Driver	No.	Make	1	2	3	4	5	6	7	8	9	10	11	12	13	14	15	16	17	18	19	20	21	22	23	24	25	26	27	28	29	30	31	32	33	34	35	Owners	Pts
2009	Mike Harmon	58	Chevy	DAY	CAL	LVS	BRI	TEX	NSH	PHO	TAL	RCH	DAR	CLT	DOV	NSH	KEN	MLW	NHA	DAY; 31	CHI	GTY	IRP	IOW	GLN	MCH	BRI	CGV	ATL	RCH	DOV	KAN	CAL	CLT	MEM					
2009	Josh Wise	58	Chevy																																	TEX; 27	PHO; 34			
2009	Chase Austin	58	Chevy																																			HOM; DNQ		
2010	Chase Austin	58	Chevy	DAY; Wth	CAL																																			
2010	Marc Davis	58	Chevy			LVS; Wth	BRI	NSH	PHO	TEX	TAL	RCH	DAR	DOV	CLT	NSH	KEN	ROA	NHA	DAY	CHI	GTY	IRP	IOW	GLN	MCH	BRI	CGV	ATL	RCH	DOV	KAN	CAL	CLT	GTY	TEX	PHO	HOM		
