= 2024 Quaker State 400 =

NASCAR Cup Series race

2024 Quaker State 400 available at Walmart
Race details
- Race 27 of 36 in the 2024 NASCAR Cup Series
- Date: September 8, 2024
- Location: Atlanta Motor Speedway in Hampton, Georgia
- Course: Permanent racing facility
- Course length: 1.54 miles (2.48 km)
- Distance: 266 laps, 409.64 mi (655.383 km)
- Scheduled distance: 260 laps, 400.4 mi (644.244 km)
- Average speed: 134.450 miles per hour (216.376 km/h)

Pole position
Driver	Michael McDowell	Front Row Motorsports
- Time: 30.927

Most laps led
Driver	Austin Cindric	Team Penske
- Laps: 92

Winner
No. 22	Joey Logano	Team Penske

Television in the United States
- Network: USA
- Announcers: Leigh Diffey, Jeff Burton, and Steve Letarte

Radio in the United States
- Radio: PRN
- Booth announcers: Doug Rice and Mark Garrow
- Turn announcers: Doug Turnbull (1 & 2) and Pat Patterson (3 & 4)

The 2024 Quaker State 400 available at Walmart was a NASCAR Cup Series race held on September 8, 2024, at Atlanta Motor Speedway in Hampton, Georgia. Contested over 266 laps—extended from 260 laps due to an overtime finish on the 1.54-mile-long (2.48 km) asphalt quad-oval intermediate speedway (with superspeedway rules). It was the 27th race of the 2024 NASCAR Cup Series season, the first race of the 2024 NASCAR playoffs, and the first race of the Round of 16. Joey Logano won the race. Daniel Suárez finished 2nd, and Ryan Blaney finished 3rd. Christopher Bell and Alex Bowman rounded out the top five, and Tyler Reddick, Kyle Busch, Chase Elliott, William Byron, and Austin Cindric rounded out the top ten.

== Report ==
=== Background ===
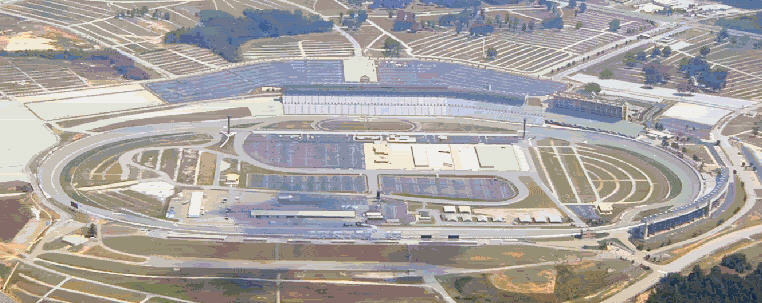
Atlanta Motor Speedway, the track where the race was held.

Atlanta Motor Speedway is a track in Hampton, Georgia, 20 miles (32 km) south of Atlanta. It is a 1.54-mile (2.48 km) quad-oval track with a seating capacity of 111,000. It opened in 1960 as a 1.5-mile (2.4 km) standard oval. In 1994, 46 condominiums were built over the northeastern side of the track. In 1997, to standardize the track with Speedway Motorsports' other two 1.5-mile (2.4 km) ovals, the entire track was almost completely rebuilt. The frontstretch and backstretch were swapped, and the configuration of the track was changed from oval to quad-oval. The project made the track one of the fastest on the NASCAR circuit.

==== Entry list ====
- (R) denotes rookie driver.
- (P) denotes playoff driver.
- (i) denotes driver who is ineligible for series driver points.

No.	Driver	Team	Manufacturer
1	Ross Chastain	Trackhouse Racing	Chevrolet
2	Austin Cindric (P)	Team Penske	Ford
3	Austin Dillon	Richard Childress Racing	Chevrolet
4	Josh Berry (R)	Stewart-Haas Racing	Ford
5	Kyle Larson (P)	Hendrick Motorsports	Chevrolet
6	Brad Keselowski (P)	RFK Racing	Ford
7	Corey LaJoie	Spire Motorsports	Chevrolet
8	Kyle Busch	Richard Childress Racing	Chevrolet
9	Chase Elliott (P)	Hendrick Motorsports	Chevrolet
10	Noah Gragson	Stewart-Haas Racing	Ford
11	Denny Hamlin (P)	Joe Gibbs Racing	Toyota
12	Ryan Blaney (P)	Team Penske	Ford
14	Chase Briscoe (P)	Stewart-Haas Racing	Ford
15	Cody Ware	Rick Ware Racing	Ford
16	Shane van Gisbergen (i)	Kaulig Racing	Chevrolet
17	Chris Buescher	RFK Racing	Ford
19	Martin Truex Jr. (P)	Joe Gibbs Racing	Toyota
20	Christopher Bell (P)	Joe Gibbs Racing	Toyota
21	Harrison Burton (P)	Wood Brothers Racing	Ford
22	Joey Logano (P)	Team Penske	Ford
23	Bubba Wallace	23XI Racing	Toyota
24	William Byron (P)	Hendrick Motorsports	Chevrolet
31	Daniel Hemric	Kaulig Racing	Chevrolet
34	Michael McDowell	Front Row Motorsports	Ford
38	Todd Gilliland	Front Row Motorsports	Ford
41	Ryan Preece	Stewart-Haas Racing	Ford
42	John Hunter Nemechek	Legacy Motor Club	Toyota
43	Erik Jones	Legacy Motor Club	Toyota
44	J. J. Yeley (i)	NY Racing Team	Chevrolet
45	Tyler Reddick (P)	23XI Racing	Toyota
47	Ricky Stenhouse Jr.	JTG Daugherty Racing	Chevrolet
48	Alex Bowman (P)	Hendrick Motorsports	Chevrolet
51	Justin Haley	Rick Ware Racing	Ford
54	Ty Gibbs (P)	Joe Gibbs Racing	Toyota
71	Zane Smith (R)	Spire Motorsports	Chevrolet
77	Carson Hocevar (R)	Spire Motorsports	Chevrolet
78	B. J. McLeod (i)	Live Fast Motorsports	Chevrolet
99	Daniel Suárez (P)	Trackhouse Racing	Chevrolet
Official entry list

== Qualifying ==
Michael McDowell scored the pole for the race with a time of 30.927 and a speed of 179.261 mph (288.493 km/h).

=== Qualifying results ===
Pos	No.	Driver	Team	Manufacturer	R1	R2
1	34	Michael McDowell	Front Row Motorsports	Ford	30.972	30.927
2	12	Ryan Blaney (P)	Team Penske	Ford	30.954	31.000
3	38	Todd Gilliland	Front Row Motorsports	Ford	31.071	31.012
4	4	Josh Berry (R)	Stewart-Haas Racing	Ford	31.160	31.068
5	2	Austin Cindric (P)	Team Penske	Ford	31.131	31.073
6	5	Kyle Larson (P)	Hendrick Motorsports	Chevrolet	31.069	31.083
7	22	Joey Logano (P)	Team Penske	Ford	31.017	31.083
8	3	Austin Dillon	Richard Childress Racing	Chevrolet	31.167	31.120
9	24	William Byron (P)	Hendrick Motorsports	Chevrolet	31.130	31.130
10	14	Chase Briscoe (P)	Stewart-Haas Racing	Ford	31.156	31.131
11	48	Alex Bowman (P)	Hendrick Motorsports	Chevrolet	31.200	—
12	21	Harrison Burton (P)	Wood Brothers Racing	Ford	31.208	—
13	10	Noah Gragson	Stewart-Haas Racing	Ford	31.209	—
14	31	Daniel Hemric	Kaulig Racing	Chevrolet	31.225	—
15	8	Kyle Busch	Richard Childress Racing	Chevrolet	31.237	—
16	9	Chase Elliott (P)	Hendrick Motorsports	Chevrolet	31.257	—
17	17	Chris Buescher	RFK Racing	Ford	31.264	—
18	1	Ross Chastain	Trackhouse Racing	Chevrolet	31.272	—
19	6	Brad Keselowski (P)	RFK Racing	Ford	31.288	—
20	54	Ty Gibbs (P)	Joe Gibbs Racing	Toyota	31.303	—
21	41	Ryan Preece	Stewart-Haas Racing	Ford	31.305	—
22	19	Martin Truex Jr. (P)	Joe Gibbs Racing	Toyota	31.337	—
23	45	Tyler Reddick (P)	23XI Racing	Toyota	31.339	—
24	23	Bubba Wallace	23XI Racing	Toyota	31.355	—
25	7	Corey LaJoie	Spire Motorsports	Chevrolet	31.388	—
26	20	Christopher Bell (P)	Joe Gibbs Racing	Toyota	31.440	—
27	47	Ricky Stenhouse Jr.	JTG Daugherty Racing	Chevrolet	31.441	—
28	16	Shane van Gisbergen (i)	Kaulig Racing	Chevrolet	31.457	—
29	51	Justin Haley	Rick Ware Racing	Ford	31.479	—
30	99	Daniel Suárez (P)	Trackhouse Racing	Chevrolet	31.488	—
31	15	Cody Ware	Rick Ware Racing	Ford	31.548	—
32	77	Carson Hocevar (R)	Spire Motorsports	Chevrolet	31.557	—
33	43	Erik Jones	Legacy Motor Club	Toyota	31.565	—
34	71	Zane Smith (R)	Spire Motorsports	Chevrolet	31.598	—
35	42	John Hunter Nemechek	Legacy Motor Club	Toyota	31.663	—
36	78	B. J. McLeod (i)	Live Fast Motorsports	Chevrolet	32.251	—
37	44	J. J. Yeley (i)	NY Racing Team	Chevrolet	32.625	—
38	11	Denny Hamlin (P)	Joe Gibbs Racing	Toyota	33.066	—
Official qualifying results

== Race ==
=== Race results ===
==== Stage results ====
Stage One Laps: 60

Pos	No	Driver	Team	Manufacturer	Points
1	12	Ryan Blaney (P)	Team Penske	Ford	10
2	2	Austin Cindric (P)	Team Penske	Ford	9
3	48	Alex Bowman (P)	Hendrick Motorsports	Chevrolet	8
4	22	Joey Logano (P)	Team Penske	Ford	7
5	47	Ricky Stenhouse Jr.	JTG Daugherty Racing	Chevrolet	6
6	1	Ross Chastain	Trackhouse Racing	Chevrolet	5
7	9	Chase Elliott (P)	Hendrick Motorsports	Chevrolet	4
8	24	William Byron (P)	Hendrick Motorsports	Chevrolet	3
9	19	Martin Truex Jr. (P)	Joe Gibbs Racing	Toyota	2
10	54	Ty Gibbs (P)	Joe Gibbs Racing	Toyota	1
Official stage one results

Stage Two Laps: 100

Pos	No	Driver	Team	Manufacturer	Points
1	2	Austin Cindric (P)	Team Penske	Ford	10
2	12	Ryan Blaney (P)	Team Penske	Ford	9
3	48	Alex Bowman (P)	Hendrick Motorsports	Chevrolet	8
4	99	Daniel Suárez (P)	Trackhouse Racing	Chevrolet	7
5	24	William Byron (P)	Hendrick Motorsports	Chevrolet	6
6	47	Ricky Stenhouse Jr.	JTG Daugherty Racing	Chevrolet	5
7	1	Ross Chastain	Trackhouse Racing	Chevrolet	4
8	9	Chase Elliott (P)	Hendrick Motorsports	Chevrolet	3
9	54	Ty Gibbs (P)	Joe Gibbs Racing	Toyota	2
10	20	Christopher Bell (P)	Joe Gibbs Racing	Toyota	1
Official stage two results

=== Final Stage results ===
Stage Three Laps: 100

Pos	Grid	No	Driver	Team	Manufacturer	Laps	Points
1	7	22	Joey Logano (P)	Team Penske	Ford	266	47
2	30	99	Daniel Suárez (P)	Trackhouse Racing	Chevrolet	266	42
3	2	12	Ryan Blaney (P)	Team Penske	Ford	266	53
4	26	20	Christopher Bell (P)	Joe Gibbs Racing	Toyota	266	34
5	11	48	Alex Bowman (P)	Hendrick Motorsports	Chevrolet	266	48
6	23	45	Tyler Reddick (P)	23XI Racing	Toyota	266	31
7	15	8	Kyle Busch	Richard Childress Racing	Chevrolet	266	30
8	16	9	Chase Elliott (P)	Hendrick Motorsports	Chevrolet	266	36
9	9	24	William Byron (P)	Hendrick Motorsports	Chevrolet	266	37
10	5	2	Austin Cindric (P)	Team Penske	Ford	266	46
11	14	31	Daniel Hemric	Kaulig Racing	Chevrolet	266	26
12	29	51	Justin Haley	Rick Ware Racing	Ford	266	25
13	18	1	Ross Chastain	Trackhouse Racing	Chevrolet	266	33
14	27	47	Ricky Stenhouse Jr.	JTG Daugherty Racing	Chevrolet	266	34
15	25	7	Corey LaJoie	Spire Motorsports	Chevrolet	266	22
16	32	77	Carson Hocevar (R)	Spire Motorsports	Chevrolet	266	21
17	20	54	Ty Gibbs (P)	Joe Gibbs Racing	Toyota	266	23
18	21	41	Ryan Preece	Stewart-Haas Racing	Ford	266	19
19	19	6	Brad Keselowski (P)	RFK Racing	Ford	266	18
20	8	3	Austin Dillon	Richard Childress Racing	Chevrolet	266	17
21	34	71	Zane Smith (R)	Spire Motorsports	Chevrolet	266	16
22	1	34	Michael McDowell	Front Row Motorsports	Ford	266	15
23	37	44	J. J. Yeley (i)	NY Racing Team	Chevrolet	266	0
24	38	11	Denny Hamlin (P)	Joe Gibbs Racing	Toyota	266	13
25	36	78	B. J. McLeod (i)	Live Fast Motorsports	Chevrolet	266	0
26	33	43	Erik Jones	Legacy Motor Club	Toyota	266	11
27	3	38	Todd Gilliland	Front Row Motorsports	Ford	266	10
28	4	4	Josh Berry (R)	Stewart-Haas Racing	Ford	266	9
29	24	23	Bubba Wallace	23XI Racing	Toyota	266	8
30	31	15	Cody Ware	Rick Ware Racing	Ford	266	7
31	12	21	Harrison Burton (P)	Wood Brothers Racing	Ford	266	6
32	28	16	Shane van Gisbergen (i)	Kaulig Racing	Chevrolet	264	0
33	35	42	John Hunter Nemechek	Legacy Motor Club	Toyota	262	4
34	13	10	Noah Gragson	Stewart-Haas Racing	Ford	258	3
35	22	19	Martin Truex Jr. (P)	Joe Gibbs Racing	Toyota	254	4
36	17	17	Chris Buescher	RFK Racing	Ford	205	1
37	6	5	Kyle Larson (P)	Hendrick Motorsports	Chevrolet	55	1
38	10	14	Chase Briscoe (P)	Stewart-Haas Racing	Ford	55	1
Official race results

=== Race statistics ===
- Lead changes: 24 among 14 different drivers
- Cautions/Laps: 8
- Red flags: 0
- Time of race: 3 hours, 6 minutes, and 11 seconds
- Average speed: 134.450 miles per hour (216.376 km/h)

== Media ==
=== Television ===
USA covered the race on the television side. Leigh Diffey, Jeff Burton, and Steve Letarte called the race from the broadcast booth. Dave Burns, Kim Coon and Marty Snider handled the pit road duties from pit lane. Similar to the Summer Daytona race and the Summer Talladega race, NBC showed every green flag lap ad-free.

USA
Booth announcers	Pit reporters
Lap-by-lap: Leigh Diffey; Color-commentator: Jeff Burton; Color-commentator: Steve Letarte	Dave Burns; Kim Coon; Marty Snider

=== Radio ===
The race was broadcast on radio by the Performance Racing Network and simulcast on Sirius XM NASCAR Radio. Doug Rice and Mark Garrow called the race from the booth when the field raced down the front stretch. Doug Turnbull called the race from atop a billboard outside of turn 2 when the field raced through turns 1 and 2. Pat Patterson called the race from a billboard outside of turn 3 when the field raced through turns 3 and 4. On pit road, PRN was manned by Brad Gillie, Brett McMillan, and Wendy Venturini.

PRN
Booth announcers	Turn announcers	Pit reporters
Lead announcer: Doug Rice; Announcer: Mark Garrow	Turns 1 & 2: Doug Turnbull; Turns 3 & 4: Pat Patterson	Brad Gillie; Brett McMillan; Wendy Venturini

== Standings after the race ==
Drivers' Championship standings

	Pos	Driver	Points
4	1	Ryan Blaney	2,071
	2	Christopher Bell	2,066 (–5)
	3	Tyler Reddick	2,059 (–12)
	4	William Byron	2,059 (–12)
4	5	Joey Logano	2,054 (–17)
6	6	Alex Bowman	2,053 (–18)
3	7	Austin Cindric	2,053 (–18)
1	8	Chase Elliott	2,050 (–21)
2	9	Daniel Suárez	2,047 (–24)
9	10	Kyle Larson	2,041 (–30)
5	11	Denny Hamlin	2,028 (–43)
3	12	Ty Gibbs	2,026 (–45)
5	13	Brad Keselowski	2,026 (–45)
	14	Harrison Burton	2,011 (–60)
1	15	Martin Truex Jr.	2,008 (–63)
3	16	Chase Briscoe	2,006 (–65)
Official driver's standings

Manufacturers' Championship standings

Pos	Manufacturer	Points
1	Chevrolet	979
2	Toyota	962 (–17)
3	Ford	948 (–31)

- Note: Only the first 16 positions are included for the driver standings.

Previous race: 2024 Cook Out Southern 500	NASCAR Cup Series; 2024 season	Next race: 2024 Go Bowling at The Glen
