= 2024 Hollywood Casino 400 =

NASCAR Cup Series race

2024 Hollywood Casino 400 presented by ESPN BET
Race details
- Race 30 of 36 in the 2024 NASCAR Cup Series
- Date: September 29, 2024
- Location: Kansas Speedway in Kansas City, Kansas
- Course: Permanent racing facility
- Course length: 1.5 miles (2.4 km)
- Distance: 267 laps, 400.5 mi (640.8 km)
- Weather: Sunny with a temperature around 82 °F (28 °C); wind out of the southwest at around 8 miles per hour (13 km/h).
- Average speed: 123.294 miles per hour (198.422 km/h)

Pole position
Driver	Christopher Bell	Joe Gibbs Racing
- Time: 30.111

Most laps led
Driver	Christopher Bell	Joe Gibbs Racing
- Laps: 122

Winner
No. 1	Ross Chastain	Trackhouse Racing

Television in the United States
- Network: USA
- Announcers: Leigh Diffey, Jeff Burton, and Steve Letarte
- Nielsen ratings: 1.794 million

Radio in the United States
- Radio: MRN
- Booth announcers: Alex Hayden, Jeff Striegle and Todd Gordon
- Turn announcers: Dave Moody (1 & 2) and Mike Bagley (3 & 4)

The 2024 Hollywood Casino 400 presented by ESPN Bet was a NASCAR Cup Series race held on September 29, 2024, at Kansas Speedway in Kansas City, Kansas. Contested over 267 laps on the 1.5 mi (2.4 km) intermediate speedway, it was the 30th race of the 2024 NASCAR Cup Series season, the fourth race of the Playoffs, and the first race of the Round of 12. Ross Chastain won the race. William Byron finished 2nd, and Martin Truex Jr. finished 3rd. Ryan Blaney and Ty Gibbs rounded out the top five, and Alex Bowman, Christopher Bell, Denny Hamlin, Chase Elliott, and Zane Smith rounded out the top ten.

== Report ==
=== Background ===
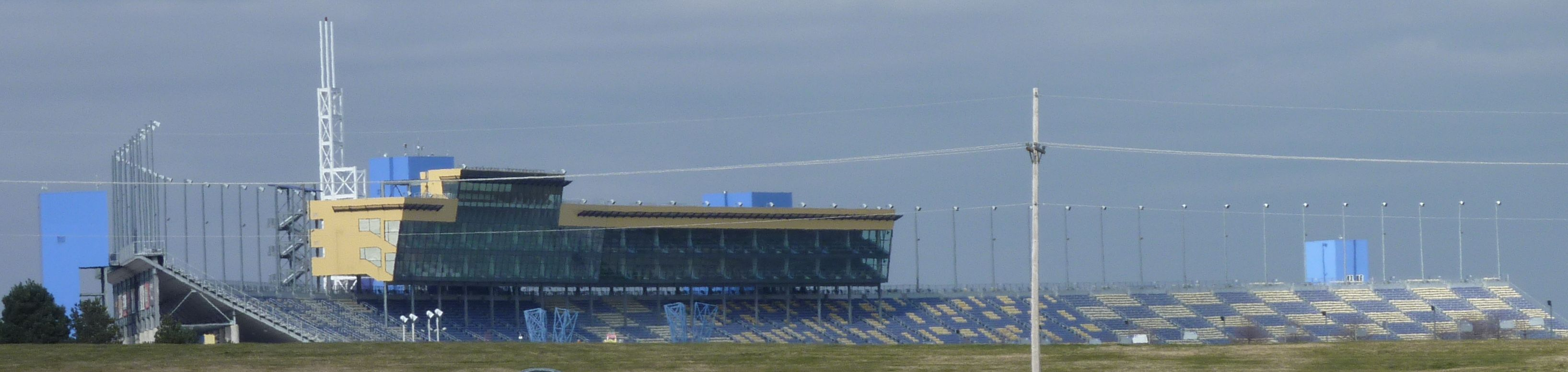
Kansas Speedway, the track where the race was held.

Kansas Speedway is a 1.5-mile (2.4 km) tri-oval race track in Kansas City, Kansas. It was built in 2001 and it currently hosts two annual NASCAR race weekends. The IndyCar Series also raced at here until 2011. The speedway is owned and operated by the International Speedway Corporation.

==== Entry list ====
- (R) denotes rookie driver.
- (P) denotes playoff driver.
- (i) denotes driver who is ineligible for series driver points.

No.	Driver	Team	Manufacturer
1	Ross Chastain	Trackhouse Racing	Chevrolet
2	Austin Cindric (P)	Team Penske	Ford
3	Austin Dillon	Richard Childress Racing	Chevrolet
4	Josh Berry (R)	Stewart-Haas Racing	Ford
5	Kyle Larson (P)	Hendrick Motorsports	Chevrolet
6	Brad Keselowski	RFK Racing	Ford
7	Justin Haley	Spire Motorsports	Chevrolet
8	Kyle Busch	Richard Childress Racing	Chevrolet
9	Chase Elliott (P)	Hendrick Motorsports	Chevrolet
10	Noah Gragson	Stewart-Haas Racing	Ford
11	Denny Hamlin (P)	Joe Gibbs Racing	Toyota
12	Ryan Blaney (P)	Team Penske	Ford
14	Chase Briscoe (P)	Stewart-Haas Racing	Ford
15	Kaz Grala (R)	Rick Ware Racing	Ford
16	Ty Dillon (i)	Kaulig Racing	Chevrolet
17	Chris Buescher	RFK Racing	Ford
19	Martin Truex Jr.	Joe Gibbs Racing	Toyota
20	Christopher Bell (P)	Joe Gibbs Racing	Toyota
21	Harrison Burton	Wood Brothers Racing	Ford
22	Joey Logano (P)	Team Penske	Ford
23	Bubba Wallace	23XI Racing	Toyota
24	William Byron (P)	Hendrick Motorsports	Chevrolet
31	Daniel Hemric	Kaulig Racing	Chevrolet
34	Michael McDowell	Front Row Motorsports	Ford
38	Todd Gilliland	Front Row Motorsports	Ford
41	Ryan Preece	Stewart-Haas Racing	Ford
42	John Hunter Nemechek	Legacy Motor Club	Toyota
43	Erik Jones	Legacy Motor Club	Toyota
44	J. J. Yeley (i)	NY Racing Team	Chevrolet
45	Tyler Reddick (P)	23XI Racing	Toyota
47	Ricky Stenhouse Jr.	JTG Daugherty Racing	Chevrolet
48	Alex Bowman (P)	Hendrick Motorsports	Chevrolet
51	Corey LaJoie	Rick Ware Racing	Ford
54	Ty Gibbs	Joe Gibbs Racing	Toyota
71	Zane Smith (R)	Spire Motorsports	Chevrolet
77	Carson Hocevar (R)	Spire Motorsports	Chevrolet
84	Jimmie Johnson	Legacy Motor Club	Toyota
99	Daniel Suárez (P)	Trackhouse Racing	Chevrolet
Official entry list

== Practice ==
Ross Chastain was the fastest in the practice session with a time of 30.433 seconds and a speed of 177.439 mph (285.560 km/h).

=== Practice results ===
Pos	No.	Driver	Team	Manufacturer	Time	Speed
1	1	Ross Chastain	Trackhouse Racing	Chevrolet	30.433	177.439
2	99	Daniel Suárez (P)	Trackhouse Racing	Chevrolet	30.478	177.177
3	48	Alex Bowman (P)	Hendrick Motorsports	Chevrolet	30.504	177.026
Official practice results

== Qualifying ==
Christopher Bell scored the pole for the race with a time of 30.111 and a speed of 179.336 mph (288.613 km/h).

=== Qualifying results ===
Pos	No.	Driver	Team	Manufacturer	R1	R2
1	20	Christopher Bell (P)	Joe Gibbs Racing	Toyota	30.043	30.111
2	54	Ty Gibbs	Joe Gibbs Racing	Toyota	30.227	30.151
3	8	Kyle Busch	Richard Childress Racing	Chevrolet	30.155	30.228
4	45	Tyler Reddick (P)	23XI Racing	Toyota	30.313	30.207
5	22	Joey Logano (P)	Team Penske	Ford	30.132	30.333
6	24	William Byron (P)	Hendrick Motorsports	Chevrolet	30.220	30.295
7	12	Ryan Blaney (P)	Team Penske	Ford	30.162	30.454
8	11	Denny Hamlin (P)	Joe Gibbs Racing	Toyota	30.252	30.300
9	14	Chase Briscoe (P)	Stewart-Haas Racing	Ford	30.218	30.688
10	99	Daniel Suárez (P)	Trackhouse Racing	Chevrolet	30.309	30.315
11	5	Kyle Larson (P)	Hendrick Motorsports	Chevrolet	30.278	—
12	48	Alex Bowman (P)	Hendrick Motorsports	Chevrolet	30.452	—
13	23	Bubba Wallace	23XI Racing	Toyota	30.299	—
14	77	Carson Hocevar (R)	Spire Motorsports	Chevrolet	30.476	—
15	71	Zane Smith (R)	Spire Motorsports	Chevrolet	30.316	—
16	43	Erik Jones	Legacy Motor Club	Toyota	30.526	—
17	2	Austin Cindric (P)	Team Penske	Ford	30.319	—
18	47	Ricky Stenhouse Jr.	JTG Daugherty Racing	Chevrolet	30.535	—
19	19	Martin Truex Jr.	Joe Gibbs Racing	Toyota	30.341	—
20	1	Ross Chastain	Trackhouse Racing	Chevrolet	30.607	—
21	34	Michael McDowell	Front Row Motorsports	Ford	30.387	—
22	3	Austin Dillon	Richard Childress Racing	Chevrolet	30.607	—
23	7	Justin Haley	Spire Motorsports	Chevrolet	30.492	—
24	10	Noah Gragson	Stewart-Haas Racing	Ford	30.664	—
25	17	Chris Buescher	RFK Racing	Ford	30.526	—
26	6	Brad Keselowski	RFK Racing	Ford	30.716	—
27	51	Corey LaJoie	Rick Ware Racing	Ford	30.594	—
28	21	Harrison Burton	Wood Brothers Racing	Ford	30.780	—
29	4	Josh Berry (R)	Stewart-Haas Racing	Ford	30.596	—
30	31	Daniel Hemric	Kaulig Racing	Chevrolet	30.809	—
31	42	John Hunter Nemechek	Legacy Motor Club	Toyota	30.654	—
32	16	Ty Dillon (i)	Kaulig Racing	Chevrolet	30.952	—
33	38	Todd Gilliland	Front Row Motorsports	Ford	30.789	—
34	15	Kaz Grala (R)	Rick Ware Racing	Ford	31.172	—
35	84	Jimmie Johnson	Legacy Motor Club	Toyota	30.892	—
36	44	J. J. Yeley (i)	NY Racing Team	Chevrolet	31.656	—
37	41	Ryan Preece	Stewart-Haas Racing	Ford	30.934	—
38	9	Chase Elliott (P)	Hendrick Motorsports	Chevrolet	32.220	—
Official qualifying results

== Race ==
=== Race results ===
==== Stage results ====
Stage One Laps: 80

Pos	No	Driver	Team	Manufacturer	Points
1	24	William Byron (P)	Hendrick Motorsports	Chevrolet	10
2	22	Joey Logano (P)	Team Penske	Ford	9
3	12	Ryan Blaney (P)	Team Penske	Ford	8
4	11	Denny Hamlin (P)	Joe Gibbs Racing	Toyota	7
5	20	Christopher Bell (P)	Joe Gibbs Racing	Toyota	6
6	54	Ty Gibbs	Joe Gibbs Racing	Toyota	5
7	2	Austin Cindric (P)	Team Penske	Ford	4
8	19	Martin Truex Jr.	Joe Gibbs Racing	Toyota	3
9	48	Alex Bowman (P)	Hendrick Motorsports	Chevrolet	2
10	77	Carson Hocevar (R)	Spire Motorsports	Chevrolet	1
Official stage one results

Stage Two Laps: 85

Pos	No	Driver	Team	Manufacturer	Points
1	48	Alex Bowman (P)	Hendrick Motorsports	Chevrolet	10
2	54	Ty Gibbs	Joe Gibbs Racing	Toyota	9
3	12	Ryan Blaney (P)	Team Penske	Ford	8
4	24	William Byron (P)	Hendrick Motorsports	Chevrolet	7
5	6	Brad Keselowski	RFK Racing	Ford	6
6	77	Carson Hocevar (R)	Spire Motorsports	Chevrolet	5
7	8	Kyle Busch	Richard Childress Racing	Chevrolet	4
8	19	Martin Truex Jr.	Joe Gibbs Racing	Toyota	3
9	9	Chase Elliott (P)	Hendrick Motorsports	Chevrolet	2
10	14	Chase Briscoe (P)	Stewart-Haas Racing	Ford	1
Official stage two results

=== Final Stage results ===
Stage Three Laps: 102

Pos	Grid	No	Driver	Team	Manufacturer	Laps	Points
1	20	1	Ross Chastain	Trackhouse Racing	Chevrolet	267	40
2	6	24	William Byron (P)	Hendrick Motorsports	Chevrolet	267	52
3	19	19	Martin Truex Jr.	Joe Gibbs Racing	Toyota	267	40
4	7	12	Ryan Blaney (P)	Team Penske	Ford	267	49
5	2	54	Ty Gibbs	Joe Gibbs Racing	Toyota	267	46
6	12	48	Alex Bowman (P)	Hendrick Motorsports	Chevrolet	267	43
7	1	20	Christopher Bell (P)	Joe Gibbs Racing	Toyota	267	36
8	8	11	Denny Hamlin (P)	Joe Gibbs Racing	Toyota	267	36
9	38	9	Chase Elliott (P)	Hendrick Motorsports	Chevrolet	267	30
10	15	71	Zane Smith (R)	Spire Motorsports	Chevrolet	267	27
11	25	17	Chris Buescher	RFK Racing	Ford	267	26
12	22	3	Austin Dillon	Richard Childress Racing	Chevrolet	267	25
13	10	99	Daniel Suárez (P)	Trackhouse Racing	Chevrolet	267	24
14	5	22	Joey Logano (P)	Team Penske	Ford	267	32
15	27	51	Corey LaJoie	Rick Ware Racing	Ford	267	22
16	37	41	Ryan Preece	Stewart-Haas Racing	Ford	267	21
17	13	23	Bubba Wallace	23XI Racing	Toyota	267	20
18	24	10	Noah Gragson	Stewart-Haas Racing	Ford	267	19
19	3	8	Kyle Busch	Richard Childress Racing	Chevrolet	267	22
20	30	31	Daniel Hemric	Kaulig Racing	Chevrolet	267	17
21	32	16	Ty Dillon (i)	Kaulig Racing	Chevrolet	267	0
22	26	6	Brad Keselowski	RFK Racing	Ford	267	21
23	28	21	Harrison Burton	Wood Brothers Racing	Ford	267	14
24	9	14	Chase Briscoe (P)	Stewart-Haas Racing	Ford	267	14
25	4	45	Tyler Reddick (P)	23XI Racing	Toyota	267	12
26	11	5	Kyle Larson (P)	Hendrick Motorsports	Chevrolet	267	11
27	33	38	Todd Gilliland	Front Row Motorsports	Ford	267	10
28	18	47	Ricky Stenhouse Jr.	JTG Daugherty Racing	Chevrolet	267	9
29	21	34	Michael McDowell	Front Row Motorsports	Ford	267	8
30	31	42	John Hunter Nemechek	Legacy Motor Club	Toyota	267	7
31	34	15	Kaz Grala (R)	Rick Ware Racing	Ford	267	6
32	14	77	Carson Hocevar (R)	Spire Motorsports	Chevrolet	267	11
33	23	7	Justin Haley	Spire Motorsports	Chevrolet	266	4
34	17	2	Austin Cindric (P)	Team Penske	Ford	263	7
35	16	43	Erik Jones	Legacy Motor Club	Toyota	263	2
36	35	84	Jimmie Johnson	Legacy Motor Club	Toyota	257	1
37	36	44	J. J. Yeley (i)	NY Racing Team	Chevrolet	118	0
38	29	4	Josh Berry (R)	Stewart-Haas Racing	Ford	0	1
Official race results

=== Race statistics ===
- Lead changes: 30 among 15 different drivers
- Cautions/Laps: 10 for 47 laps
- Red flags: 0
- Time of race: 3 hours, 14 minutes, and 54 seconds
- Average speed: 123.294 miles per hour (198.422 km/h)

== Media ==
=== Television ===
USA covered the race on the television side. Leigh Diffey, Jeff Burton, and Steve Letarte called the race from the broadcast booth. Kim Coon, Parker Kligerman, and Marty Snider handled the pit road duties from pit lane.

USA
Booth announcers	Pit reporters
Lap-by-lap: Leigh Diffey; Color-commentator: Jeff Burton; Color-commentator: Steve Letarte	Kim Coon; Parker Kligerman; Marty Snider

=== Radio ===
MRN had the radio call for the race, which was also simulcast on Sirius XM NASCAR Radio. Alex Hayden, Jeff Striegle and former Championship Crew Chief Todd Gordon called the race for MRN when the field raced thru the front straightaway. Dave Moody called the race for MRN from Turns 1 & 2, and Mike Bagley called the race for MRN from turns 3 & 4. Steve Post, Alan Cavanna, Jacklyn Drake and Winston Kelley covered the action for MRN from pit lane.

MRN
Booth announcers	Turn announcers	Pit reporters
Lead announcer: Alex Hayden; Announcer: Jeff Striegle; Announcer: Todd Gordon	Turns 1 & 2: Dave Moody; Turns 3 & 4: Mike Bagley	Steve Post; Alan Cavanna; Jacklyn Drake; Winston Kelley

== Standings after the race ==
Drivers' Championship standings

	Pos	Driver	Points
3	1	William Byron	3,074
3	2	Ryan Blaney	3,068 (–6)
1	3	Christopher Bell	3,068 (–6)
3	4	Kyle Larson	3,058 (–16)
1	5	Denny Hamlin	3,051 (–23)
5	6	Alex Bowman	3,048 (–26)
	7	Chase Elliott	3,044 (–30)
	8	Joey Logano	3,044 (–30)
6	9	Tyler Reddick	3,040 (–34)
	10	Daniel Suárez	3,030 (–44)
1	11	Chase Briscoe	3,019 (–55)
3	12	Austin Cindric	3,015 (–59)
	13	Ty Gibbs	2,120 (–954)
	14	Martin Truex Jr.	2,104 (–970)
	15	Brad Keselowski	2,069 (–1,005)
	16	Harrison Burton	2,045 (–1,029)
Official driver's standings

Manufacturers' Championship standings

	Pos	Manufacturer	Points
	1	Chevrolet	1,095
1	2	Toyota	1,053 (–42)
1	2	Ford	1,052 (–43)

- Note: Only the first 16 positions are included for the driver standings.

Previous race: 2024 Bass Pro Shops Night Race	NASCAR Cup Series; 2024 season	Next race: 2024 YellaWood 500
