= 2022 Pennzoil 400 =

Third race of the 2022 NASCAR Cup Series

Race details
- Race 3 of 36 in the 2022 NASCAR Cup Series
- Date: March 6, 2022
- Location: Las Vegas Motor Speedway in Las Vegas
- Course: Permanent racing facility
- Course length: 1.5 miles (2.4 km)
- Distance: 274 laps, 411 mi (657.6 km)
- Scheduled distance: 267 laps, 400.5 mi (640.8 km)
- Average speed: 117.552 miles per hour (189.182 km/h)

Pole position
Driver	Christopher Bell	Joe Gibbs Racing
- Time: 29.561

Most laps led
Driver	Ross Chastain	Trackhouse Racing Team
- Laps: 83

Winner
No. 48	Alex Bowman	Hendrick Motorsports

Television in the United States
- Network: Fox
- Announcers: Mike Joy, Clint Bowyer, and Danica Patrick
- Nielsen ratings: 2.71, 4.544 Million Viewers

Radio in the United States
- Radio: PRN
- Booth announcers: Doug Rice and Mark Garrow
- Turn announcers: Rob Albright (1 & 2) and Pat Patterson (3 & 4)

The 2022 Pennzoil 400 presented by Jiffy Lube was the third stock car race of the 2022 NASCAR Cup Series and the 25th running of the event. The race was held on Sunday, March 6, 2022, in North Las Vegas, Nevada at Las Vegas Motor Speedway, a 1.5 miles (2.4 km) permanent D-shaped oval racetrack. The race was extended from its scheduled 267 laps to 274 due to a NASCAR overtime caused by a crash including Erik Jones and Bubba Wallace. At race's end, Alex Bowman, driving for Hendrick Motorsports, would manage to climb to the front on the final restart and held off teammate and eventual second-place finisher Kyle Larson to win his seventh career NASCAR Cup Series win and his first of the season. To fill out the top 3, Ross Chastain of the Trackhouse Racing Team would finish third.

== Report ==
=== Background ===
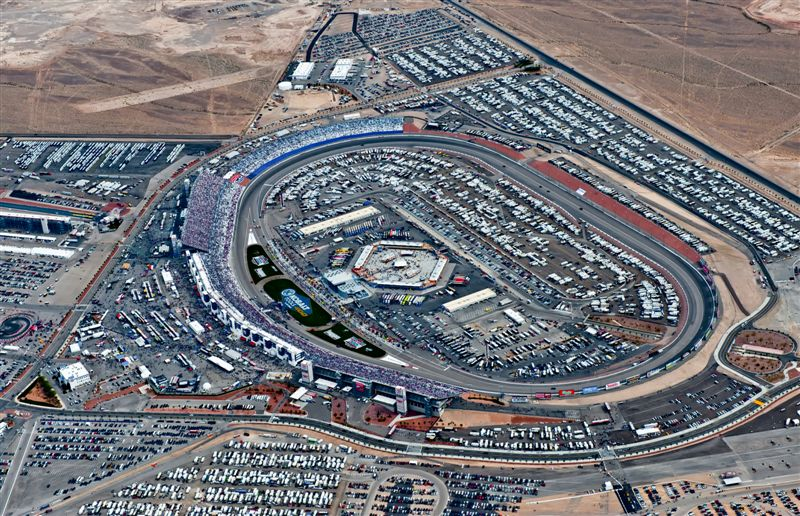
Las Vegas Motor Speedway, the track where the race was held.

Las Vegas Motor Speedway, located in Clark County, Nevada outside the Las Vegas city limits and about 15 miles northeast of the Las Vegas Strip, is a 1,200-acre (490 ha) complex of multiple tracks for motorsports racing. The complex is owned by Speedway Motorsports, Inc., which is headquartered in Charlotte, North Carolina.

==== Entry list ====
- (R) denotes rookie driver.
- (i) denotes driver who is ineligible for series driver points.

No.	Driver	Team	Manufacturer
1	Ross Chastain	Trackhouse Racing Team	Chevrolet
2	Austin Cindric (R)	Team Penske	Ford
3	Austin Dillon	Richard Childress Racing	Chevrolet
4	Kevin Harvick	Stewart-Haas Racing	Ford
5	Kyle Larson	Hendrick Motorsports	Chevrolet
6	Brad Keselowski	RFK Racing	Ford
7	Corey LaJoie	Spire Motorsports	Chevrolet
8	Tyler Reddick	Richard Childress Racing	Chevrolet
9	Chase Elliott	Hendrick Motorsports	Chevrolet
10	Aric Almirola	Stewart-Haas Racing	Ford
11	Denny Hamlin	Joe Gibbs Racing	Toyota
12	Ryan Blaney	Team Penske	Ford
14	Chase Briscoe	Stewart-Haas Racing	Ford
15	Garrett Smithley	Rick Ware Racing	Ford
16	Daniel Hemric (i)	Kaulig Racing	Chevrolet
17	Chris Buescher	RFK Racing	Ford
18	Kyle Busch	Joe Gibbs Racing	Toyota
19	Martin Truex Jr.	Joe Gibbs Racing	Toyota
20	Christopher Bell	Joe Gibbs Racing	Toyota
21	Harrison Burton (R)	Wood Brothers Racing	Ford
22	Joey Logano	Team Penske	Ford
23	Bubba Wallace	23XI Racing	Toyota
24	William Byron	Hendrick Motorsports	Chevrolet
31	Justin Haley	Kaulig Racing	Chevrolet
34	Michael McDowell	Front Row Motorsports	Ford
38	Todd Gilliland (R)	Front Row Motorsports	Ford
41	Cole Custer	Stewart-Haas Racing	Ford
42	Ty Dillon	Petty GMS Motorsports	Chevrolet
43	Erik Jones	Petty GMS Motorsports	Chevrolet
44	Greg Biffle	NY Racing Team	Chevrolet
45	Kurt Busch	23XI Racing	Toyota
47	Ricky Stenhouse Jr.	JTG Daugherty Racing	Chevrolet
48	Alex Bowman	Hendrick Motorsports	Chevrolet
51	Cody Ware	Rick Ware Racing	Ford
77	Josh Bilicki (i)	Spire Motorsports	Chevrolet
78	B. J. McLeod	Live Fast Motorsports	Ford
99	Daniel Suárez	Trackhouse Racing Team	Chevrolet
Official entry list

== Practice ==
Kyle Larson was the fastest in the practice session with a time of 29.804 seconds and a speed of 181.184 mph (291.587 km/h).

=== Practice results ===
Pos	No.	Driver	Team	Manufacturer	Time	Speed
1	5	Kyle Larson	Hendrick Motorsports	Chevrolet	29.804	181.184
2	20	Christopher Bell	Joe Gibbs Racing	Toyota	29.872	180.771
3	12	Ryan Blaney	Team Penske	Ford	30.000	180.000
Official practice results

== Qualifying ==
Christopher Bell scored the pole for the race with a time of 29.561 seconds and a speed of 182.673 mph (293.984 km/h).

=== Qualifying results ===
Pos	No.	Driver	Team	Manufacturer	R1	R2
1	20	Christopher Bell	Joe Gibbs Racing	Toyota	29.755	29.561
2	5	Kyle Larson	Hendrick Motorsports	Chevrolet	29.613	29.668
3	2	Austin Cindric (R)	Team Penske	Ford	29.799	29.704
4	14	Chase Briscoe	Stewart-Haas Racing	Ford	29.795	29.714
5	9	Chase Elliott	Hendrick Motorsports	Chevrolet	29.802	29.716
6	22	Joey Logano	Team Penske	Ford	29.827	29.777
7	8	Tyler Reddick	Richard Childress Racing	Chevrolet	29.770	29.801
8	11	Denny Hamlin	Joe Gibbs Racing	Toyota	29.801	29.802
9	47	Ricky Stenhouse Jr.	JTG Daugherty Racing	Chevrolet	29.925	30.040
10	3	Austin Dillon	Richard Childress Racing	Chevrolet	29.845	30.046
11	12	Ryan Blaney	Team Penske	Ford	29.843	—
12	19	Martin Truex Jr.	Joe Gibbs Racing	Toyota	29.884	—
13	48	Alex Bowman	Hendrick Motorsports	Chevrolet	29.958	—
14	24	William Byron	Hendrick Motorsports	Chevrolet	29.996	—
15	6	Brad Keselowski	RFK Racing	Ford	30.031	—
16	16	Daniel Hemric (i)	Kaulig Racing	Chevrolet	30.100	—
17	23	Bubba Wallace	23XI Racing	Toyota	30.147	—
18	1	Ross Chastain	Trackhouse Racing Team	Chevrolet	30.159	—
19	21	Harrison Burton (R)	Wood Brothers Racing	Ford	30.196	—
20	10	Aric Almirola	Stewart-Haas Racing	Ford	30.214	—
21	99	Daniel Suárez	Trackhouse Racing Team	Chevrolet	30.219	—
22	34	Michael McDowell	Front Row Motorsports	Ford	30.232	—
23	43	Erik Jones	Petty GMS Motorsports	Chevrolet	30.249	—
24	41	Cole Custer	Stewart-Haas Racing	Ford	30.357	—
25	4	Kevin Harvick	Stewart-Haas Racing	Ford	30.368	—
26	44	Greg Biffle	NY Racing Team	Chevrolet	30.467	—
27	17	Chris Buescher	RFK Racing	Ford	30.528	—
28	31	Justin Haley	Kaulig Racing	Chevrolet	30.530	—
29	7	Corey LaJoie	Spire Motorsports	Chevrolet	30.628	—
30	38	Todd Gilliland (R)	Front Row Motorsports	Ford	30.686	—
31	45	Kurt Busch	23XI Racing	Toyota	30.713	—
32	42	Ty Dillon	Petty GMS Motorsports	Chevrolet	30.777	—
33	51	Cody Ware	Rick Ware Racing	Ford	31.195	—
34	77	Josh Bilicki (i)	Spire Motorsports	Chevrolet	31.402	—
35	78	B. J. McLeod	Live Fast Motorsports	Ford	32.006	—
36	15	Garrett Smithley	Rick Ware Racing	Ford	32.413	—
37	18	Kyle Busch	Joe Gibbs Racing	Toyota	0.000	—
Official qualifying results

== Race ==
=== Stage Results ===
Stage One Laps: 80

Pos	No	Driver	Team	Manufacturer	Points
1	48	Alex Bowman	Hendrick Motorsports	Chevrolet	10
2	24	William Byron	Hendrick Motorsports	Chevrolet	9
3	1	Ross Chastain	Trackhouse Racing Team	Chevrolet	8
4	11	Denny Hamlin	Joe Gibbs Racing	Toyota	7
5	9	Chase Elliott	Hendrick Motorsports	Chevrolet	6
6	5	Kyle Larson	Hendrick Motorsports	Chevrolet	5
7	12	Ryan Blaney	Team Penske	Ford	4
8	14	Chase Briscoe	Stewart-Haas Racing	Ford	3
9	18	Kyle Busch	Joe Gibbs Racing	Toyota	2
10	20	Christopher Bell	Joe Gibbs Racing	Toyota	1
Official stage one results

Stage Two Laps: 85

Pos	No	Driver	Team	Manufacturer	Points
1	1	Ross Chastain	Trackhouse Racing Team	Chevrolet	10
2	9	Chase Elliott	Hendrick Motorsports	Chevrolet	9
3	5	Kyle Larson	Hendrick Motorsports	Chevrolet	8
4	24	William Byron	Hendrick Motorsports	Chevrolet	7
5	18	Kyle Busch	Joe Gibbs Racing	Toyota	6
6	19	Martin Truex Jr.	Joe Gibbs Racing	Toyota	5
7	22	Joey Logano	Team Penske	Ford	4
8	4	Kevin Harvick	Stewart-Haas Racing	Ford	3
9	11	Denny Hamlin	Joe Gibbs Racing	Toyota	2
10	23	Bubba Wallace	23XI Racing	Toyota	1
Official stage two results

=== Final Stage Results ===
Stage Three Laps: 102

Pos	Grid	No	Driver	Team	Manufacturer	Laps	Points
1	13	48	Alex Bowman	Hendrick Motorsports	Chevrolet	274	50
2	2	5	Kyle Larson	Hendrick Motorsports	Chevrolet	274	48
3	18	1	Ross Chastain	Trackhouse Racing Team	Chevrolet	274	52
4	37	18	Kyle Busch	Joe Gibbs Racing	Toyota	274	41
5	14	24	William Byron	Hendrick Motorsports	Chevrolet	274	48
6	20	10	Aric Almirola	Stewart-Haas Racing	Ford	274	31
7	7	8	Tyler Reddick	Richard Childress Racing	Chevrolet	274	30
8	12	19	Martin Truex Jr.	Joe Gibbs Racing	Toyota	274	34
9	5	9	Chase Elliott	Hendrick Motorsports	Chevrolet	274	43
10	1	20	Christopher Bell	Joe Gibbs Racing	Toyota	274	28
11	10	3	Austin Dillon	Richard Childress Racing	Chevrolet	274	26
12	25	4	Kevin Harvick	Stewart-Haas Racing	Ford	274	28
13	31	45	Kurt Busch	23XI Racing	Toyota	274	24
14	6	22	Joey Logano	Team Penske	Ford	274	27
15	29	7	Corey LaJoie	Spire Motorsports	Chevrolet	274	22
16	19	21	Harrison Burton (R)	Wood Brothers Racing	Ford	274	21
17	28	31	Justin Haley	Kaulig Racing	Chevrolet	274	20
18	27	17	Chris Buescher	RFK Racing	Ford	274	19
19	3	2	Austin Cindric (R)	Team Penske	Ford	274	18
20	32	42	Ty Dillon	Petty GMS Motorsports	Chevrolet	274	17
21	9	47	Ricky Stenhouse Jr.	JTG Daugherty Racing	Chevrolet	274	16
22	16	16	Daniel Hemric (i)	Kaulig Racing	Chevrolet	274	0
23	30	38	Todd Gilliland (R)	Front Row Motorsports	Ford	274	14
24	15	6	Brad Keselowski	RFK Racing	Ford	273	13
25	17	23	Bubba Wallace	23XI Racing	Toyota	273	13
26	33	51	Cody Ware	Rick Ware Racing	Ford	273	11
27	22	34	Michael McDowell	Front Row Motorsports	Ford	273	10
28	35	78	B. J. McLeod	Live Fast Motorsports	Ford	272	9
29	34	77	Josh Bilicki (i)	Spire Motorsports	Chevrolet	271	0
30	36	15	Garrett Smithley	Rick Ware Racing	Ford	267	7
31	23	43	Erik Jones	Petty GMS Motorsports	Chevrolet	264	6
32	8	11	Denny Hamlin	Joe Gibbs Racing	Toyota	219	14
33	24	41	Cole Custer	Stewart-Haas Racing	Ford	170	4
34	26	44	Greg Biffle	NY Racing Team	Chevrolet	147	3
35	4	14	Chase Briscoe	Stewart-Haas Racing	Ford	135	5
36	11	12	Ryan Blaney	Team Penske	Ford	104	5
37	21	99	Daniel Suárez	Trackhouse Racing Team	Chevrolet	92	1
Official race results

=== Race statistics ===
- Lead changes: 23 among 15 different drivers
- Cautions/Laps: 12 for 60
- Red flags: 0
- Time of race: 3 hours, 29 minutes and 50 seconds
- Average speed: 117.552 miles per hour (189.182 km/h)

== Media ==
=== Television ===
Fox Sports covered their 22nd race at the Las Vegas Motor Speedway. Mike Joy, Clint Bowyer, and Danica Patrick called the race from the broadcast booth. Jamie Little and Regan Smith handled pit road, and Larry McReynolds provided insight from the Fox Sports studio in Charlotte.

Fox
Booth announcers	Pit reporters	In-race analyst
Lap-by-lap: Mike Joy; Color-commentator: Clint Bowyer; Color-commentator: Danica Patrick	Jamie Little; Regan Smith	Larry McReynolds

=== Radio ===
PRN covered the radio call for the race which was also simulcasted on Sirius XM NASCAR Radio. Doug Rice and Mark Garrow called the race in the booth where the field raced through the tri-oval. Rob Albright called the race from a billboard in turn 2 where the field raced through turns 1 and 2. Pat Patterson called the race from a billboard outside of turn 3 where the field raced through turns 3 and 4. Brad Gillie, Brett McMillan, Wendy Venturini, and Heather Debeaux worked pit road for the radio side.

PRN
Booth announcers	Turn announcers	Pit reporters
Lead announcer: Doug Rice; Announcer: Mark Garrow	Turns 1 & 2: Rob Albright; Turns 3 & 4: Pat Patterson	Brad Gillie; Brett McMillan; Wendy Venturini; Heather Debeaux

== Standings after the race ==
Drivers' Championship standings

	Pos	Driver	Points
7	1	Kyle Larson	113
1	2	Martin Truex Jr.	107 (–6)
1	3	Joey Logano	104 (–9)
3	4	Austin Cindric	103 (–10)
6	5	Kyle Busch	102 (–11)
1	6	Aric Almirola	97 (–16)
12	7	Chase Elliott	88 (–25)
17	8	Alex Bowman	80 (–33)
	9	Bubba Wallace	78 (–35)
4	10	Austin Dillon	78 (–35)
1	11	Kurt Busch	77 (–36)
2	12	Brad Keselowski	77 (–36)
9	13	Ryan Blaney	75 (–38)
9	14	Chase Briscoe	74 (–39)
9	15	Erik Jones	74 (–39)
4	16	Kevin Harvick	69 (–44)
Official driver's standings

Manufacturers' Championship standings

	Pos	Manufacturer	Points
1	1	Chevrolet	107
1	2	Ford	103 (–4)
	3	Toyota	97 (–10)

- Note: Only the first 16 positions are included for the driver standings.

Previous race: 2022 WISE Power 400	NASCAR Cup Series; 2022 season	Next race: 2022 Ruoff Mortgage 500
