= 2024 The Great American Getaway 400 =

NASCAR Cup Series race

2024 The Great American Getaway 400 presented by VISITPA
Race details
- Race 21 of 36 in the 2024 NASCAR Cup Series
- Date: July 14, 2024
- Location: Pocono Raceway in Long Pond, Pennsylvania
- Course: Permanent racing facility
- Course length: 2.5 miles (4 km)
- Distance: 160 laps, 400 mi (640 km)
- Average speed: 123.722 miles per hour (199.111 km/h)

Pole position
Driver	Ty Gibbs	Joe Gibbs Racing
- Time: 52.929

Most laps led
Driver	Ryan Blaney	Team Penske
- Laps: 44

Winner
No. 12	Ryan Blaney	Team Penske

Television in the United States
- Network: USA
- Announcers: Rick Allen, Jeff Burton, and Steve Letarte
- Nielsen ratings: 2.4 million

Radio in the United States
- Radio: MRN
- Booth announcers: Alex Hayden, Mike Bagley, and Todd Gordon
- Turn announcers: Dave Moody (1), Kyle Rickey (2), and Jason Toy (3)

The 2024 The Great American Getaway 400 presented by VISITPA was a NASCAR Cup Series race held on July 14, 2024, at the Pocono Raceway in Long Pond, Pennsylvania. Contested over 160 laps on the 2.5-mile (4.0 km) oval, it was the 21st race of the 2024 NASCAR Cup Series season. Ryan Blaney won the race. Denny Hamlin finished 2nd, and Alex Bowman finished 3rd. William Byron and Joey Logano rounded out the top five, and Tyler Reddick, Brad Keselowski, Martin Truex Jr., Chase Elliott, and Bubba Wallace rounded out the top ten.

== Report ==
=== Background ===
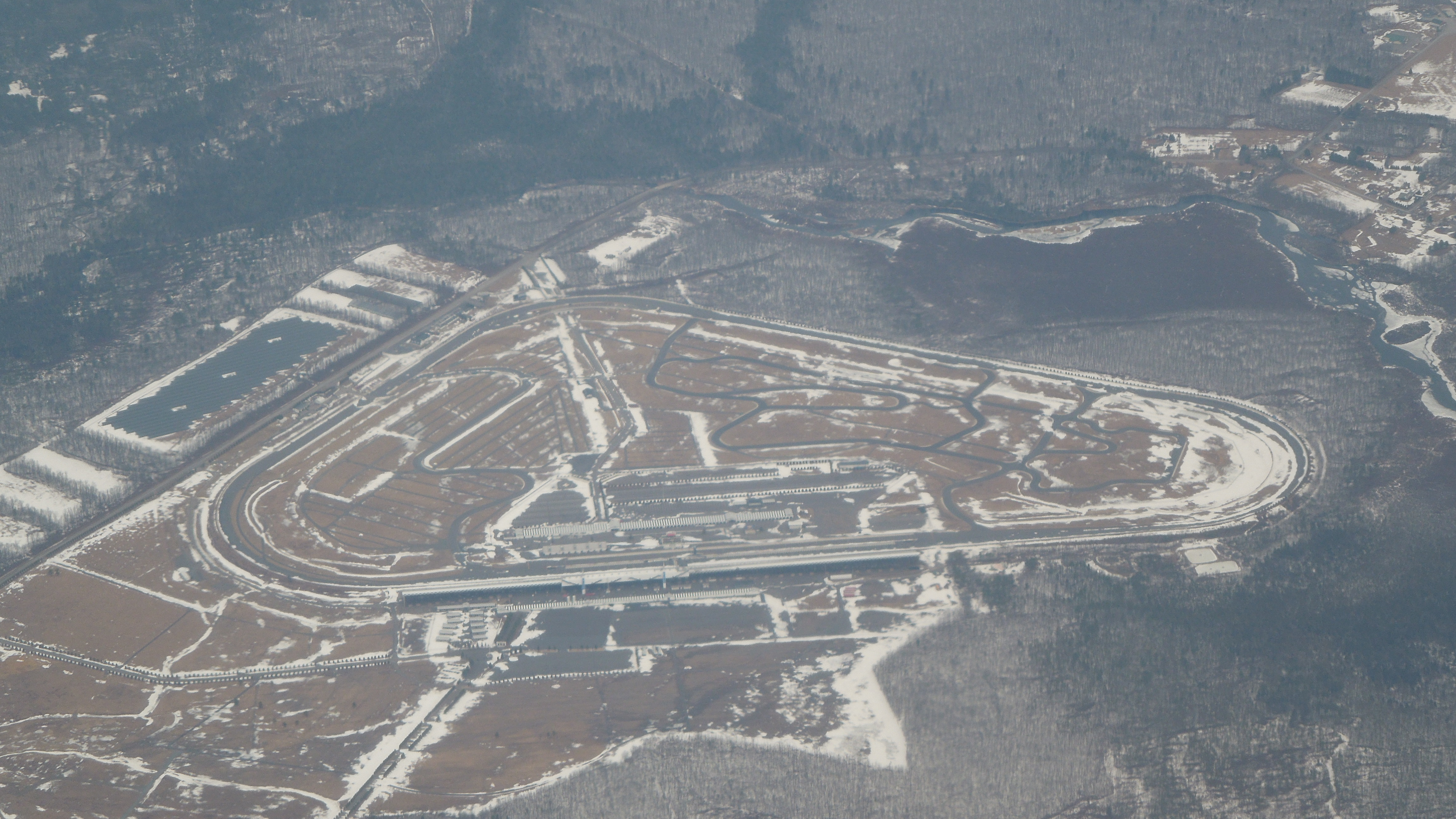
Pocono Raceway, the track where the race was held.

Pocono Raceway is a 2.5-mile (4.0 km) oval speedway located in Long Pond, Pennsylvania, which has hosted NASCAR racing annually since the early 1970s. Nicknamed "The Tricky Triangle", the speedway has three distinct corners and is known for high speeds along its lengthy straightaways.

From 1982 to 2019, the circuit had two race weekends. In 2020, the circuit was reduced to one race meeting of two races. The first race was moved to World Wide Technology Raceway near St. Louis starting in 2022.

==== Entry list ====
- (R) denotes rookie driver.
- (i) denotes driver who is ineligible for series driver points.

No.	Driver	Team	Manufacturer
1	Ross Chastain	Trackhouse Racing	Chevrolet
2	Austin Cindric	Team Penske	Ford
3	Austin Dillon	Richard Childress Racing	Chevrolet
4	Josh Berry (R)	Stewart-Haas Racing	Ford
5	Kyle Larson	Hendrick Motorsports	Chevrolet
6	Brad Keselowski	RFK Racing	Ford
7	Corey LaJoie	Spire Motorsports	Chevrolet
8	Kyle Busch	Richard Childress Racing	Chevrolet
9	Chase Elliott	Hendrick Motorsports	Chevrolet
10	Noah Gragson	Stewart-Haas Racing	Ford
11	Denny Hamlin	Joe Gibbs Racing	Toyota
12	Ryan Blaney	Team Penske	Ford
14	Chase Briscoe	Stewart-Haas Racing	Ford
15	Cody Ware	Rick Ware Racing	Ford
16	A. J. Allmendinger (i)	Kaulig Racing	Chevrolet
17	Chris Buescher	RFK Racing	Ford
19	Martin Truex Jr.	Joe Gibbs Racing	Toyota
20	Christopher Bell	Joe Gibbs Racing	Toyota
21	Harrison Burton	Wood Brothers Racing	Ford
22	Joey Logano	Team Penske	Ford
23	Bubba Wallace	23XI Racing	Toyota
24	William Byron	Hendrick Motorsports	Chevrolet
31	Daniel Hemric	Kaulig Racing	Chevrolet
34	Michael McDowell	Front Row Motorsports	Ford
38	Todd Gilliland	Front Row Motorsports	Ford
41	Ryan Preece	Stewart-Haas Racing	Ford
42	John Hunter Nemechek	Legacy Motor Club	Toyota
43	Erik Jones	Legacy Motor Club	Toyota
44	J. J. Yeley (i)	NY Racing Team	Chevrolet
45	Tyler Reddick	23XI Racing	Toyota
47	Ricky Stenhouse Jr.	JTG Daugherty Racing	Chevrolet
48	Alex Bowman	Hendrick Motorsports	Chevrolet
51	Justin Haley	Rick Ware Racing	Ford
54	Ty Gibbs	Joe Gibbs Racing	Toyota
71	Zane Smith (R)	Spire Motorsports	Chevrolet
77	Carson Hocevar (R)	Spire Motorsports	Chevrolet
99	Daniel Suárez	Trackhouse Racing	Chevrolet
Official entry list

== Practice ==
Tyler Reddick was the fastest in the practice session with a time of 53.498 seconds and a speed of 168.231 mph (270.742 km/h).

=== Practice results ===
Pos	No.	Driver	Team	Manufacturer	Time	Speed
1	45	Tyler Reddick	23XI Racing	Toyota	53.498	168.231
2	24	William Byron	Hendrick Motorsports	Chevrolet	53.590	167.942
3	19	Martin Truex Jr.	Joe Gibbs Racing	Toyota	53.590	167.942
Official practice results

== Qualifying ==
Ty Gibbs scored the pole for the race with a time of 52.929 and a speed of 170.039 mph (273.651 km/h).

It was the first year the Cup Series used road course qualifying regulations, a procedure where teams did not use the start-finish line but used a timing line on the circuit for their lap, which was also used at Indianapolis. Teams started their lap midway down the North Straight exiting Turn 2 after less than two-thirds of a lap to warm up. After completing their lap in the North Straight, teams then pitted their cars. Only two, instead of three, laps would be driven by drivers under the use of the hybrid road course and longer speedway qualifying procedure.

=== Qualifying results ===
Pos	No.	Driver	Team	Manufacturer	R1	R2
1	54	Ty Gibbs	Joe Gibbs Racing	Toyota	53.157	52.929
2	24	William Byron	Hendrick Motorsports	Chevrolet	53.005	53.047
3	19	Martin Truex Jr.	Joe Gibbs Racing	Toyota	53.343	53.185
4	11	Denny Hamlin	Joe Gibbs Racing	Toyota	53.191	53.239
5	4	Josh Berry (R)	Stewart-Haas Racing	Ford	53.241	53.212
6	48	Alex Bowman	Hendrick Motorsports	Chevrolet	52.899	53.342
7	45	Tyler Reddick	23XI Racing	Toyota	53.227	53.545
8	12	Ryan Blaney	Team Penske	Ford	53.364	53.356
9	71	Zane Smith (R)	Spire Motorsports	Chevrolet	53.502	53.595
10	22	Joey Logano	Team Penske	Ford	53.421	53.502
11	9	Chase Elliott	Hendrick Motorsports	Chevrolet	53.532	—
12	5	Kyle Larson	Hendrick Motorsports	Chevrolet	53.449	—
13	20	Christopher Bell	Joe Gibbs Racing	Toyota	53.554	—
14	6	Brad Keselowski	RFK Racing	Ford	53.603	—
15	77	Carson Hocevar (R)	Spire Motorsports	Chevrolet	53.603	—
16	99	Daniel Suárez	Trackhouse Racing	Chevrolet	53.63	—
17	3	Austin Dillon	Richard Childress Racing	Chevrolet	53.673	—
18	17	Chris Buescher	RFK Racing	Ford	53.645	—
19	1	Ross Chastain	Trackhouse Racing	Chevrolet	53.769	—
20	2	Austin Cindric	Team Penske	Ford	53.675	—
21	34	Michael McDowell	Front Row Motorsports	Ford	53.769	—
22	21	Harrison Burton	Wood Brothers Racing	Ford	53.713	—
23	43	Erik Jones	Legacy Motor Club	Toyota	53.713	—
24	8	Kyle Busch	Richard Childress Racing	Chevrolet	53.756	—
25	10	Noah Gragson	Stewart-Haas Racing	Ford	53.86	—
26	16	A. J. Allmendinger (i)	Kaulig Racing	Chevrolet	53.76	—
27	31	Daniel Hemric	Kaulig Racing	Chevrolet	53.944	—
28	14	Chase Briscoe	Stewart-Haas Racing	Ford	53.799	—
29	23	Bubba Wallace	23XI Racing	Toyota	53.947	—
30	7	Corey LaJoie	Spire Motorsports	Chevrolet	53.902	—
31	47	Ricky Stenhouse Jr.	JTG Daugherty Racing	Chevrolet	54.018	—
32	42	John Hunter Nemechek	Legacy Motor Club	Toyota	53.924	—
33	38	Todd Gilliland	Front Row Motorsports	Ford	54.122	—
34	51	Justin Haley	Rick Ware Racing	Ford	54.082	—
35	15	Cody Ware	Rick Ware Racing	Ford	54.192	—
36	41	Ryan Preece	Stewart-Haas Racing	Ford	54.677	—
37	44	J. J. Yeley (i)	NY Racing Team	Chevrolet	0	—
Official qualifying results

== Race ==
=== Race results ===
==== Stage results ====
Stage One Laps: 30

Pos	No	Driver	Team	Manufacturer	Points
1	19	Martin Truex Jr.	Joe Gibbs Racing	Toyota	10
2	11	Denny Hamlin	Joe Gibbs Racing	Toyota	9
3	45	Tyler Reddick	23XI Racing	Toyota	8
4	24	William Byron	Hendrick Motorsports	Chevrolet	7
5	9	Chase Elliott	Hendrick Motorsports	Chevrolet	6
6	48	Alex Bowman	Hendrick Motorsports	Chevrolet	5
7	22	Joey Logano	Team Penske	Ford	4
8	6	Brad Keselowski	RFK Racing	Ford	3
9	20	Christopher Bell	Joe Gibbs Racing	Toyota	2
10	43	Erik Jones	Legacy Motor Club	Toyota	1
Official stage one results

Stage Two Laps: 65

Pos	No	Driver	Team	Manufacturer	Points
1	11	Denny Hamlin	Joe Gibbs Racing	Toyota	10
2	9	Chase Elliott	Hendrick Motorsports	Chevrolet	9
3	6	Brad Keselowski	RFK Racing	Ford	8
4	24	William Byron	Hendrick Motorsports	Chevrolet	7
5	43	Erik Jones	Legacy Motor Club	Toyota	6
6	5	Kyle Larson	Hendrick Motorsports	Chevrolet	5
7	48	Alex Bowman	Hendrick Motorsports	Chevrolet	4
8	20	Christopher Bell	Joe Gibbs Racing	Toyota	3
9	22	Joey Logano	Team Penske	Ford	2
10	45	Tyler Reddick	23XI Racing	Toyota	1
Official stage two results

=== Final Stage results ===
Stage Three Laps: 65

Pos	Grid	No	Driver	Team	Manufacturer	Laps	Points
1	8	12	Ryan Blaney	Team Penske	Ford	160	40
2	4	11	Denny Hamlin	Joe Gibbs Racing	Toyota	160	54
3	6	48	Alex Bowman	Hendrick Motorsports	Chevrolet	160	43
4	2	24	William Byron	Hendrick Motorsports	Chevrolet	160	47
5	10	22	Joey Logano	Team Penske	Ford	160	38
6	7	45	Tyler Reddick	23XI Racing	Toyota	160	40
7	14	6	Brad Keselowski	RFK Racing	Ford	160	41
8	3	19	Martin Truex Jr.	Joe Gibbs Racing	Toyota	160	39
9	11	9	Chase Elliott	Hendrick Motorsports	Chevrolet	160	43
10	29	23	Bubba Wallace	23XI Racing	Toyota	160	27
11	18	17	Chris Buescher	RFK Racing	Ford	160	26
12	13	20	Christopher Bell	Joe Gibbs Racing	Toyota	160	30
13	12	5	Kyle Larson	Hendrick Motorsports	Chevrolet	160	29
14	23	43	Erik Jones	Legacy Motor Club	Toyota	160	30
15	28	14	Chase Briscoe	Stewart-Haas Racing	Ford	160	22
16	16	99	Daniel Suárez	Trackhouse Racing	Chevrolet	160	21
17	15	77	Carson Hocevar (R)	Spire Motorsports	Chevrolet	160	20
18	20	2	Austin Cindric	Team Penske	Ford	160	19
19	30	7	Corey LaJoie	Spire Motorsports	Chevrolet	160	18
20	5	4	Josh Berry (R)	Stewart-Haas Racing	Ford	160	17
21	26	16	A. J. Allmendinger (i)	Kaulig Racing	Chevrolet	160	0
22	34	51	Justin Haley	Rick Ware Racing	Ford	160	15
23	17	3	Austin Dillon	Richard Childress Racing	Chevrolet	160	14
24	21	34	Michael McDowell	Front Row Motorsports	Ford	158	13
25	27	31	Daniel Hemric	Kaulig Racing	Chevrolet	153	12
26	35	15	Cody Ware	Rick Ware Racing	Ford	134	11
27	1	54	Ty Gibbs	Joe Gibbs Racing	Toyota	132	10
28	32	42	John Hunter Nemechek	Legacy Motor Club	Toyota	126	9
29	9	71	Zane Smith (R)	Spire Motorsports	Chevrolet	126	8
30	36	41	Ryan Preece	Stewart-Haas Racing	Ford	121	7
31	22	21	Harrison Burton	Wood Brothers Racing	Ford	121	6
32	24	8	Kyle Busch	Richard Childress Racing	Chevrolet	120	5
33	31	47	Ricky Stenhouse Jr.	JTG Daugherty Racing	Chevrolet	120	4
34	33	38	Todd Gilliland	Front Row Motorsports	Ford	115	3
35	37	44	J. J. Yeley (i)	NY Racing Team	Chevrolet	112	0
36	19	1	Ross Chastain	Trackhouse Racing	Chevrolet	53	1
37	25	10	Noah Gragson	Stewart-Haas Racing	Ford	13	1
Official race results

=== Race statistics ===
- Lead changes: 8 among 8 different drivers
- Cautions/Laps: 8 for 32
- Red flags: 0
- Time of race: 3 hours, 13 minutes, and 59 seconds
- Average speed: 123.722 miles per hour (199.111 km/h)

== Media ==
=== Television ===
USA covered the race on the television side. Rick Allen, Jeff Burton, and Steve Letarte called the race from the broadcast booth. Kim Coon, Parker Kligerman, and Marty Snider handled the pit road duties from pit lane.

USA
Booth announcers	Pit reporters
Lap-by-lap: Rick Allen; Color-commentator: Jeff Burton; Color-commentator: Steve Letarte	Kim Coon; Parker Kligerman; Marty Snider

=== Radio ===
Radio coverage of the race was broadcast by Motor Racing Network (MRN) and was also simulcast on Sirius XM NASCAR Radio. Alex Hayden, Mike Bagley, and Todd Gordon called the race in the booth when the field raced through the tri-oval. Dave Moody called the race from the Sunoco spotters stand outside turn 2 when the field raced through turns 1 and 2. Kyle Rickey called the race from a platform inside the backstretch when the field raced down the backstretch. Jason Toy called the race from the Sunoco spotters stand outside turn 3. Steve Post, and Alan Cavanna worked pit road for MRN.

MRN Radio
Booth announcers	Turn announcers	Pit reporters
Lead announcer: Alex Hayden; Announcer: Mike Bagley; Announcer: Todd Gordon	Turns 1 & 2: Dave Moody; Backstretch: Kyle Rickey; Turn 3: Jason Toy	Steve Post; Alan Cavanna

== Standings after the race ==
Drivers' Championship standings

	Pos	Driver	Points
1	1	Chase Elliott	703
1	2	Kyle Larson	700 (–3)
	3	Tyler Reddick	688 (–18)
	4	Denny Hamlin	683 (–20)
1	5	William Byron	646 (–57)
1	6	Martin Truex Jr.	640 (–63)
	7	Ryan Blaney	627 (–76)
	8	Christopher Bell	616 (–87)
1	9	Brad Keselowski	599 (–104)
1	10	Alex Bowman	596 (–107)
2	11	Ty Gibbs	570 (–133)
1	12	Chris Buescher	547 (–156)
1	13	Ross Chastain	530 (–173)
	14	Joey Logano	522 (–181)
	15	Bubba Wallace	503 (–200)
	16	Chase Briscoe	455 (–248)
Official driver's standings

Manufacturers' Championship standings

Pos	Manufacturer	Points
1	Chevrolet	759
2	Toyota	751 (–8)
3	Ford	736 (–23)

- Note: Only the first 16 positions are included for the driver standings.
- . – Driver has clinched a position in the NASCAR Cup Series playoffs.

Previous race: 2024 Grant Park 165	NASCAR Cup Series; 2024 season	Next race: 2024 Brickyard 400
