= 2024 Straight Talk Wireless 400 =

NASCAR Cup Series race

Race details
- Race 34 of 36 in the 2024 NASCAR Cup Series
- Date: October 27, 2024
- Location: Homestead–Miami Speedway in Homestead, Florida
- Course: Permanent racing facility
- Course length: 1.5 miles (2.4 km)
- Distance: 267 laps, 400.5 mi (640.8 km)
- Average speed: 129.379 miles per hour (208.215 km/h)

Pole position
| Driver | Tyler Reddick | 23XI Racing |
- Time: 32.248

Most laps led
| Driver | Tyler Reddick | 23XI Racing |
- Laps: 97

Winner
| No. 45 | Tyler Reddick | 23XI Racing |

Television in the United States
- Network: NBC
- Announcers: Leigh Diffey, Jeff Burton, and Steve Letarte
- Nielsen ratings: 1.31 (2.344 million)

Radio in the United States
- Radio: MRN
- Booth announcers: Alex Hayden, Jeff Striegle and Todd Gordon
- Turn announcers: Dave Moody (1 & 2) and Mike Bagley (3 & 4)

The 2024 Straight Talk Wireless 400 was a NASCAR Cup Series race that was held on October 27, 2024, at Homestead–Miami Speedway in Homestead, Florida. Contested over 267 laps on the 1.5 mile (2.4 km) oval, it was the 34th race of the 2024 NASCAR Cup Series season, the eighth race of the Playoffs, and the second race of the Round of 8. Tyler Reddick won the race. Ryan Blaney finished 2nd, and Denny Hamlin finished 3rd. Christopher Bell and Chase Elliott rounded out the top five, and William Byron, Alex Bowman, A. J. Allmendinger, Carson Hocevar, and Ryan Preece rounded out the top ten.

== Report ==
=== Background ===
Homestead–Miami Speedway, the track where the race was held.

Homestead–Miami Speedway is a motor racing track located in Homestead, Florida. The track, which has several configurations, has promoted several series of racing, including NASCAR, the NTT IndyCar Series and the Grand-Am Rolex Sports Car Series.

From 2002 to 2019, Homestead–Miami Speedway hosted the final race of the season in all three of NASCAR's series: the NASCAR Cup Series, Xfinity Series, and Craftsman Truck Series; due to Ford Motor Company sponsoring all three races the weekend was known as the 'Ford Championship Weekend'. The track has since held races on different dates in 2020 (June) and 2021 (February), which were both affected by the COVID-19 pandemic, before being moved back into the Playoffs as the second race of the Round of 8 in 2022, with the date being kept for 2023.

==== Entry list ====
- (R) denotes rookie driver.
- (P) denotes playoff driver.
- (i) denotes driver who is ineligible for series driver points.

| No. | Driver | Team | Manufacturer |
|---|---|---|---|
| 1 | Ross Chastain | Trackhouse Racing | Chevrolet |
| 2 | Austin Cindric | Team Penske | Ford |
| 3 | Austin Dillon | Richard Childress Racing | Chevrolet |
| 4 | Josh Berry (R) | Stewart–Haas Racing | Ford |
| 5 | Kyle Larson (P) | Hendrick Motorsports | Chevrolet |
| 6 | Brad Keselowski | RFK Racing | Ford |
| 7 | Justin Haley | Spire Motorsports | Chevrolet |
| 8 | Kyle Busch | Richard Childress Racing | Chevrolet |
| 9 | Chase Elliott (P) | Hendrick Motorsports | Chevrolet |
| 10 | Noah Gragson | Stewart–Haas Racing | Ford |
| 11 | Denny Hamlin (P) | Joe Gibbs Racing | Toyota |
| 12 | Ryan Blaney (P) | Team Penske | Ford |
| 14 | Chase Briscoe | Stewart–Haas Racing | Ford |
| 15 | Kaz Grala (R) | Rick Ware Racing | Ford |
| 16 | A. J. Allmendinger (i) | Kaulig Racing | Chevrolet |
| 17 | Chris Buescher | RFK Racing | Ford |
| 19 | Martin Truex Jr. | Joe Gibbs Racing | Toyota |
| 20 | Christopher Bell (P) | Joe Gibbs Racing | Toyota |
| 21 | Harrison Burton | Wood Brothers Racing | Ford |
| 22 | Joey Logano (P) | Team Penske | Ford |
| 23 | Bubba Wallace | 23XI Racing | Toyota |
| 24 | William Byron (P) | Hendrick Motorsports | Chevrolet |
| 31 | Daniel Hemric | Kaulig Racing | Chevrolet |
| 34 | Michael McDowell | Front Row Motorsports | Ford |
| 38 | Todd Gilliland | Front Row Motorsports | Ford |
| 41 | Ryan Preece | Stewart–Haas Racing | Ford |
| 42 | John Hunter Nemechek | Legacy Motor Club | Toyota |
| 43 | Erik Jones | Legacy Motor Club | Toyota |
| 44 | J. J. Yeley (i) | NY Racing Team | Chevrolet |
| 45 | Tyler Reddick (P) | 23XI Racing | Toyota |
| 47 | Ricky Stenhouse Jr. | JTG Daugherty Racing | Chevrolet |
| 48 | Alex Bowman | Hendrick Motorsports | Chevrolet |
| 51 | Corey LaJoie | Rick Ware Racing | Ford |
| 54 | Ty Gibbs | Joe Gibbs Racing | Toyota |
| 66 | Chad Finchum (i) | Power Source | Ford |
| 71 | Zane Smith (R) | Spire Motorsports | Chevrolet |
| 77 | Carson Hocevar (R) | Spire Motorsports | Chevrolet |
| 99 | Daniel Suárez | Trackhouse Racing | Chevrolet |
Official entry list

== Practice ==
Tyler Reddick was the fastest in the practice session with a time of 32.187 seconds and a speed of 167.770 mph (270.000 km/h).

=== Practice results ===
| Pos | No. | Driver | Team | Manufacturer | Time | Speed |
|---|---|---|---|---|---|---|
| 1 | 45 | Tyler Reddick (P) | 23XI Racing | Toyota | 32.187 | 167.770 |
| 2 | 1 | Ross Chastain | Trackhouse Racing | Chevrolet | 32.188 | 167.764 |
| 3 | 23 | Bubba Wallace | 23XI Racing | Toyota | 32.190 | 167.754 |
Official practice results

== Qualifying ==
Tyler Reddick scored the pole for the race with a time of 32.248 and a speed of 167.452 mph (269.488 km/h).

=== Qualifying results ===
| Pos | No. | Driver | Team | Manufacturer | R1 | R2 |
|---|---|---|---|---|---|---|
| 1 | 45 | Tyler Reddick (P) | 23XI Racing | Toyota | 32.126 | 32.248 |
| 2 | 5 | Kyle Larson (P) | Hendrick Motorsports | Chevrolet | 32.340 | 32.325 |
| 3 | 20 | Christopher Bell (P) | Joe Gibbs Racing | Toyota | 32.268 | 32.369 |
| 4 | 11 | Denny Hamlin (P) | Joe Gibbs Racing | Toyota | 32.342 | 32.428 |
| 5 | 47 | Ricky Stenhouse Jr. | JTG Daugherty Racing | Chevrolet | 32.270 | 32.599 |
| 6 | 19 | Martin Truex Jr. | Joe Gibbs Racing | Toyota | 32.284 | 32.469 |
| 7 | 9 | Chase Elliott (P) | Hendrick Motorsports | Chevrolet | 32.365 | 32.693 |
| 8 | 23 | Bubba Wallace | 23XI Racing | Toyota | 32.219 | 32.505 |
| 9 | 31 | Daniel Hemric | Kaulig Racing | Chevrolet | 32.402 | 33.059 |
| 10 | 7 | Justin Haley | Spire Motorsports | Chevrolet | 32.375 | 32.596 |
| 11 | 48 | Alex Bowman | Hendrick Motorsports | Chevrolet | 32.441 | — |
| 12 | 4 | Josh Berry (R) | Stewart–Haas Racing | Ford | 32.383 | — |
| 13 | 14 | Chase Briscoe | Stewart–Haas Racing | Ford | 32.480 | — |
| 14 | 54 | Ty Gibbs | Joe Gibbs Racing | Toyota | 32.393 | — |
| 15 | 77 | Carson Hocevar (R) | Spire Motorsports | Chevrolet | 32.518 | — |
| 16 | 10 | Noah Gragson | Stewart–Haas Racing | Ford | 32.418 | — |
| 17 | 8 | Kyle Busch | Richard Childress Racing | Chevrolet | 32.530 | — |
| 18 | 6 | Brad Keselowski | RFK Racing | Ford | 32.465 | — |
| 19 | 71 | Zane Smith (R) | Spire Motorsports | Chevrolet | 32.537 | — |
| 20 | 12 | Ryan Blaney (P) | Team Penske | Ford | 32.477 | — |
| 21 | 17 | Chris Buescher | RFK Racing | Ford | 32.544 | — |
| 22 | 1 | Ross Chastain | Trackhouse Racing | Chevrolet | 32.507 | — |
| 23 | 99 | Daniel Suárez | Trackhouse Racing | Chevrolet | 32.554 | — |
| 24 | 34 | Michael McDowell | Front Row Motorsports | Ford | 32.510 | — |
| 25 | 24 | William Byron (P) | Hendrick Motorsports | Chevrolet | 32.581 | — |
| 26 | 22 | Joey Logano (P) | Team Penske | Ford | 32.562 | — |
| 27 | 15 | Kaz Grala | Rick Ware Racing | Ford | 32.644 | — |
| 28 | 43 | Erik Jones | Legacy Motor Club | Toyota | 32.577 | — |
| 29 | 42 | John Hunter Nemechek | Legacy Motor Club | Toyota | 32.652 | — |
| 30 | 3 | Austin Dillon | Richard Childress Racing | Chevrolet | 32.597 | — |
| 31 | 38 | Todd Gilliland | Front Row Motorsports | Ford | 32.703 | — |
| 32 | 16 | A. J. Allmendinger (i) | Kaulig Racing | Chevrolet | 32.637 | — |
| 33 | 51 | Corey LaJoie | Rick Ware Racing | Ford | 32.801 | — |
| 34 | 21 | Harrison Burton | Wood Brothers Racing | Ford | 32.653 | — |
| 35 | 41 | Ryan Preece | Stewart–Haas Racing | Ford | 32.844 | — |
| 36 | 2 | Austin Cindric | Team Penske | Ford | 32.810 | — |
| 37 | 44 | J. J. Yeley (i) | NY Racing Team | Chevrolet | 33.063 | — |
| 38 | 66 | Chad Finchum | Power Source | Ford | 33.794 | — |
Official qualifying results

== Race ==
=== Race results ===
==== Stage results ====
Stage One Laps: 80

| Pos | No | Driver | Team | Manufacturer | Points |
|---|---|---|---|---|---|
| 1 | 45 | Tyler Reddick (P) | 23XI Racing | Toyota | 10 |
| 2 | 23 | Bubba Wallace | 23XI Racing | Toyota | 9 |
| 3 | 9 | Chase Elliott (P) | Hendrick Motorsports | Chevrolet | 8 |
| 4 | 12 | Ryan Blaney (P) | Team Penske | Ford | 7 |
| 5 | 77 | Carson Hocevar (R) | Spire Motorsports | Chevrolet | 6 |
| 6 | 20 | Christopher Bell (P) | Joe Gibbs Racing | Toyota | 5 |
| 7 | 11 | Denny Hamlin (P) | Joe Gibbs Racing | Toyota | 4 |
| 8 | 24 | William Byron (P) | Hendrick Motorsports | Chevrolet | 3 |
| 9 | 48 | Alex Bowman | Hendrick Motorsports | Chevrolet | 2 |
| 10 | 19 | Martin Truex Jr. | Joe Gibbs Racing | Toyota | 1 |
Official stage one results

Stage Two Laps: 85

| Pos | No | Driver | Team | Manufacturer | Points |
|---|---|---|---|---|---|
| 1 | 11 | Denny Hamlin (P) | Joe Gibbs Racing | Toyota | 10 |
| 2 | 9 | Chase Elliott (P) | Hendrick Motorsports | Chevrolet | 9 |
| 3 | 20 | Christopher Bell (P) | Joe Gibbs Racing | Toyota | 8 |
| 4 | 45 | Tyler Reddick (P) | 23XI Racing | Toyota | 7 |
| 5 | 12 | Ryan Blaney (P) | Team Penske | Ford | 6 |
| 6 | 24 | William Byron (P) | Hendrick Motorsports | Chevrolet | 5 |
| 7 | 19 | Martin Truex Jr. | Joe Gibbs Racing | Toyota | 4 |
| 8 | 77 | Carson Hocevar (R) | Spire Motorsports | Chevrolet | 3 |
| 9 | 41 | Ryan Preece | Stewart–Haas Racing | Ford | 2 |
| 10 | 16 | A. J. Allmendinger (i) | Kaulig Racing | Chevrolet | 0 |
Official stage two results

=== Final Stage results ===
Stage Three Laps: 102

| Pos | Grid | No | Driver | Team | Manufacturer | Laps | Points |
|---|---|---|---|---|---|---|---|
| 1 | 1 | 45 | Tyler Reddick (P) | 23XI Racing | Toyota | 267 | 57 |
| 2 | 20 | 12 | Ryan Blaney (P) | Team Penske | Ford | 267 | 48 |
| 3 | 4 | 11 | Denny Hamlin (P) | Joe Gibbs Racing | Toyota | 267 | 48 |
| 4 | 3 | 20 | Christopher Bell (P) | Joe Gibbs Racing | Toyota | 267 | 46 |
| 5 | 7 | 9 | Chase Elliott (P) | Hendrick Motorsports | Chevrolet | 267 | 49 |
| 6 | 25 | 24 | William Byron (P) | Hendrick Motorsports | Chevrolet | 267 | 39 |
| 7 | 11 | 48 | Alex Bowman | Hendrick Motorsports | Chevrolet | 267 | 32 |
| 8 | 32 | 16 | A. J. Allmendinger (i) | Kaulig Racing | Chevrolet | 267 | 0 |
| 9 | 15 | 77 | Carson Hocevar (R) | Spire Motorsports | Chevrolet | 267 | 37 |
| 10 | 35 | 41 | Ryan Preece | Stewart–Haas Racing | Ford | 267 | 29 |
| 11 | 12 | 4 | Josh Berry (R) | Stewart–Haas Racing | Ford | 267 | 26 |
| 12 | 13 | 14 | Chase Briscoe | Stewart–Haas Racing | Ford | 267 | 25 |
| 13 | 2 | 5 | Kyle Larson (P) | Hendrick Motorsports | Chevrolet | 267 | 24 |
| 14 | 24 | 34 | Michael McDowell | Front Row Motorsports | Ford | 267 | 23 |
| 15 | 21 | 17 | Chris Buescher | RFK Racing | Ford | 267 | 22 |
| 16 | 23 | 99 | Daniel Suárez | Trackhouse Racing | Chevrolet | 267 | 21 |
| 17 | 18 | 6 | Brad Keselowski | RFK Racing | Ford | 267 | 20 |
| 18 | 8 | 23 | Bubba Wallace | 23XI Racing | Toyota | 267 | 28 |
| 19 | 16 | 10 | Noah Gragson | Stewart–Haas Racing | Ford | 267 | 18 |
| 20 | 31 | 38 | Todd Gilliland | Front Row Motorsports | Ford | 267 | 17 |
| 21 | 5 | 47 | Ricky Stenhouse Jr. | JTG Daugherty Racing | Chevrolet | 267 | 16 |
| 22 | 28 | 43 | Erik Jones | Legacy Motor Club | Toyota | 267 | 15 |
| 23 | 6 | 19 | Martin Truex Jr. | Joe Gibbs Racing | Toyota | 267 | 19 |
| 24 | 34 | 21 | Harrison Burton | Wood Brothers Racing | Ford | 267 | 13 |
| 25 | 30 | 3 | Austin Dillon | Richard Childress Racing | Chevrolet | 267 | 12 |
| 26 | 29 | 42 | John Hunter Nemechek | Legacy Motor Club | Toyota | 267 | 11 |
| 27 | 36 | 2 | Austin Cindric | Team Penske | Ford | 267 | 10 |
| 28 | 26 | 22 | Joey Logano (P) | Team Penske | Ford | 267 | 9 |
| 29 | 9 | 31 | Daniel Hemric | Kaulig Racing | Chevrolet | 267 | 8 |
| 30 | 19 | 71 | Zane Smith (R) | Spire Motorsports | Chevrolet | 267 | 7 |
| 31 | 17 | 8 | Kyle Busch | Richard Childress Racing | Chevrolet | 267 | 6 |
| 32 | 27 | 15 | Kaz Grala (R) | Rick Ware Racing | Ford | 267 | 5 |
| 33 | 22 | 1 | Ross Chastain | Trackhouse Racing | Chevrolet | 267 | 4 |
| 34 | 10 | 7 | Justin Haley | Spire Motorsports | Chevrolet | 266 | 3 |
| 35 | 33 | 51 | Corey LaJoie | Rick Ware Racing | Ford | 266 | 2 |
| 36 | 14 | 54 | Ty Gibbs | Joe Gibbs Racing | Toyota | 261 | 1 |
| 37 | 38 | 66 | Chad Finchum (i) | Power Source | Ford | 258 | 0 |
| 38 | 37 | 44 | J. J. Yeley (i) | NY Racing Team | Chevrolet | 223 | 0 |
Official race results

=== Race statistics ===
- Lead changes: 33 among 11 different drivers
- Cautions/Laps: 6 for 30
- Red flags: 0
- Time of race: 3 hours, 5 minutes, and 44 seconds
- Average speed: 129.379 miles per hour (208.215 km/h)

== Media ==
=== Television ===
NBC covered the race on the television side. Leigh Diffey, Jeff Burton, and Steve Letarte called the race from the broadcast booth. Dave Burns, Kim Coon, and Marty Snider handled the pit road duties from pit lane.

NBC
| Booth announcers | Pit reporters |
|---|---|
| Lap-by-lap: Leigh Diffey; Color-commentator: Jeff Burton; Color-commentator: Steve Letarte | Dave Burns; Kim Coon; Marty Snider |

=== Radio ===
MRN had the radio call for the race, which was also simulcast on Sirius XM NASCAR Radio. Alex Hayden, Jeff Striegle, and former NASCAR crew chief Todd Gordon called the action of the race for MRN when the field raced down the front straightaway. Dave Moody covered the action for MRN in turns 1 & 2, and Mike Bagley had the call of the action from turns 3 & 4. MRN Lead Pit Reporter Steve Post, Brienne Pedigo, and Jason Toy covered the action of the race for MRN on pit road.

MRN Radio
| Booth announcers | Turn announcers | Pit reporters |
|---|---|---|
| Lead announcer: Alex Hayden; Announcer: Jeff Striegle; Announcer: Todd Gordon | Turns 1 & 2: Dave Moody; Turns 3 & 4: Mike Bagley | Steve Post; Brienne Pedigo; Jason Toy |

== Standings after the race ==
Drivers' Championship standings

| | Pos | Driver | Points |
|---|---|---|---|
| | 1 | Christopher Bell | 4,132 |
| 1 | 2 | William Byron | 4,110 (–22) |
| 1 | 3 | Kyle Larson | 4,103 (–29) |
| 2 | 4 | Tyler Reddick | 4,098 (–34) |
| | 5 | Denny Hamlin | 4,092 (–40) |
| 1 | 6 | Ryan Blaney | 4,072 (–60) |
| 3 | 7 | Joey Logano | 4,070 (–62) |
| | 8 | Chase Elliott | 4,067 (–65) |
| | 9 | Alex Bowman | 2,264 (–1,868) |
| | 10 | Martin Truex Jr. | 2,213 (–1,919) |
| | 11 | Austin Cindric | 2,189 (–1,943) |
| | 12 | Daniel Suárez | 2,186 (–1,946) |
| | 13 | Ty Gibbs | 2,163 (–1,969) |
| | 14 | Brad Keselowski | 2,147 (–1,985) |
| | 15 | Chase Briscoe | 2,146 (–1,986) |
| | 16 | Harrison Burton | 2,100 (–2,032) |
Official driver's standings

Manufacturers' Championship standings

| Pos | Manufacturer | Points |
|---|---|---|
| 1 | Chevrolet | 1,240 |
| 2 | Ford | 1,195 (–45) |
| 3 | Toyota | 1,194 (–46) |

- Note: Only the first 16 positions are included for the driver standings.

| Previous race: 2024 South Point 400 | NASCAR Cup Series; 2024 season | Next race: 2024 Xfinity 500 |
