= 2024 Bass Pro Shops Night Race =

NASCAR Cup Series race

Race details
- Race 29 of 36 in the 2024 NASCAR Cup Series
- Date: September 21, 2024
- Location: Bristol Motor Speedway in Bristol, Tennessee
- Course: Permanent racing facility
- Course length: 0.533 miles (0.858 km)
- Distance: 500 laps, 266.5 mi (428.890 km)
- Weather: Partly Cloudy with a temperature around 62 °F (17 °C); wind out of the west at 5 miles per hour (8.0 km/h).
- Average speed: 101.277 miles per hour (162.990 km/h)

Pole position
Driver	Alex Bowman	Hendrick Motorsports
- Time: 15.142

Most laps led
Driver	Kyle Larson	Hendrick Motorsports
- Laps: 462

Winner
No. 5	Kyle Larson	Hendrick Motorsports

Television in the United States
- Network: USA
- Announcers: Leigh Diffey, Jeff Burton, and Steve Letarte
- Nielsen ratings: 1.8 million

Radio in the United States
- Radio: PRN
- Booth announcers: Doug Rice and Mark Garrow
- Turn announcers: Rob Albright (Backstretch)

The 2024 Bass Pro Shops Night Race was a NASCAR Cup Series race held on September 21, 2024, at Bristol Motor Speedway in Bristol, Tennessee. The race was contested over 500 laps on the .533 mile (0.858 km) short track. It was the 29th race of the 2024 NASCAR Cup Series season, the third of the 2024 NASCAR playoffs, and the final race of the Round of 16. Kyle Larson won the race. Chase Elliott finished 2nd, and Bubba Wallace finished 3rd. Denny Hamlin and Christopher Bell rounded out the top five, and Ryan Blaney, Ryan Preece, Chase Briscoe, Alex Bowman, and Ross Chastain rounded out the top ten.

Following this race, Harrison Burton, Ty Gibbs, Brad Keselowski, and Martin Truex Jr. were all eliminated from the playoffs.

== Report ==
=== Background ===
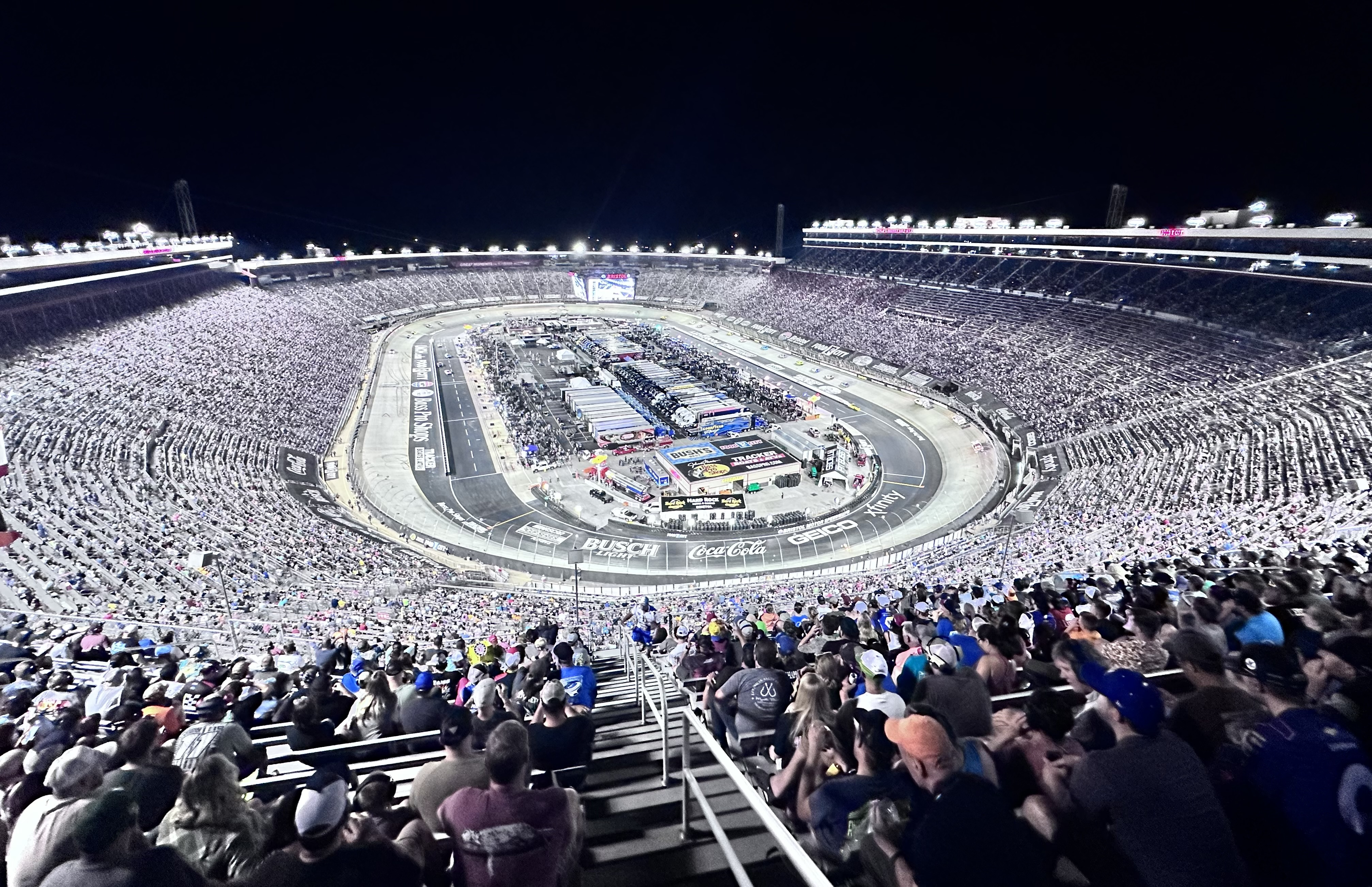
2024 Bass Pro Shops Night Race

The Bristol Motor Speedway, formerly known as Bristol International Raceway and Bristol Raceway, is a NASCAR short track venue located in Bristol, Tennessee. Constructed in 1960, it held its first NASCAR race on July 30, 1961. Despite its short length, Bristol is among the most popular tracks on the NASCAR schedule because of its distinct features, which include extraordinarily steep banking, an all concrete surface, two pit roads, and stadium-like seating. It has also been named one of the loudest NASCAR tracks.

==== Entry list ====
- (R) denotes rookie driver.
- (P) denotes playoff driver.
- (i) denotes driver who is ineligible for series driver points.

No.	Driver	Team	Manufacturer
1	Ross Chastain	Trackhouse Racing	Chevrolet
2	Austin Cindric (P)	Team Penske	Ford
3	Austin Dillon	Richard Childress Racing	Chevrolet
4	Josh Berry (R)	Stewart-Haas Racing	Ford
5	Kyle Larson (P)	Hendrick Motorsports	Chevrolet
6	Brad Keselowski (P)	RFK Racing	Ford
7	Corey LaJoie	Spire Motorsports	Chevrolet
8	Kyle Busch	Richard Childress Racing	Chevrolet
9	Chase Elliott (P)	Hendrick Motorsports	Chevrolet
10	Noah Gragson	Stewart-Haas Racing	Ford
11	Denny Hamlin (P)	Joe Gibbs Racing	Toyota
12	Ryan Blaney (P)	Team Penske	Ford
14	Chase Briscoe (P)	Stewart-Haas Racing	Ford
15	Kaz Grala (R)	Rick Ware Racing	Ford
16	A. J. Allmendinger (i)	Kaulig Racing	Chevrolet
17	Chris Buescher	RFK Racing	Ford
19	Martin Truex Jr. (P)	Joe Gibbs Racing	Toyota
20	Christopher Bell (P)	Joe Gibbs Racing	Toyota
21	Harrison Burton (P)	Wood Brothers Racing	Ford
22	Joey Logano (P)	Team Penske	Ford
23	Bubba Wallace	23XI Racing	Toyota
24	William Byron (P)	Hendrick Motorsports	Chevrolet
31	Daniel Hemric	Kaulig Racing	Chevrolet
34	Michael McDowell	Front Row Motorsports	Ford
38	Todd Gilliland	Front Row Motorsports	Ford
41	Ryan Preece	Stewart-Haas Racing	Ford
42	John Hunter Nemechek	Legacy Motor Club	Toyota
43	Erik Jones	Legacy Motor Club	Toyota
45	Tyler Reddick (P)	23XI Racing	Toyota
47	Ricky Stenhouse Jr.	JTG Daugherty Racing	Chevrolet
48	Alex Bowman (P)	Hendrick Motorsports	Chevrolet
51	Justin Haley	Rick Ware Racing	Ford
54	Ty Gibbs (P)	Joe Gibbs Racing	Toyota
66	Josh Bilicki (i)	Power Source	Ford
71	Zane Smith (R)	Spire Motorsports	Chevrolet
77	Carson Hocevar (R)	Spire Motorsports	Chevrolet
99	Daniel Suárez (P)	Trackhouse Racing	Chevrolet
Official entry list

== Practice ==
Ty Gibbs was the fastest in the practice session with a time of 15.385 seconds and a speed of 124.719 mph (200.716 km/h).

=== Practice results ===
Pos	No.	Driver	Team	Manufacturer	Time	Speed
1	54	Ty Gibbs (P)	Joe Gibbs Racing	Toyota	15.385	124.719
2	12	Ryan Blaney (P)	Team Penske	Ford	15.472	124.018
3	5	Kyle Larson (P)	Hendrick Motorsports	Chevrolet	15.487	123.897
Official practice results

== Qualifying ==
Alex Bowman scored the pole for the race with a time of 15.142 and a speed of 126.720 mph (203.936 km/h).

=== Qualifying results ===
Pos	No.	Driver	Team	Manufacturer	R1	R2
1	48	Alex Bowman (P)	Hendrick Motorsports	Chevrolet	15.197	15.142
2	5	Kyle Larson (P)	Hendrick Motorsports	Chevrolet	15.371	15.183
3	24	William Byron (P)	Hendrick Motorsports	Chevrolet	15.217	15.145
4	19	Martin Truex Jr. (P)	Joe Gibbs Racing	Toyota	15.319	15.202
5	14	Chase Briscoe (P)	Stewart-Haas Racing	Ford	15.197	15.170
6	20	Christopher Bell (P)	Joe Gibbs Racing	Toyota	15.313	15.242
7	77	Carson Hocevar (R)	Spire Motorsports	Chevrolet	15.282	15.217
8	11	Denny Hamlin (P)	Joe Gibbs Racing	Toyota	15.333	15.269
9	7	Corey LaJoie	Spire Motorsports	Chevrolet	15.250	15.330
10	9	Chase Elliott (P)	Hendrick Motorsports	Chevrolet	15.384	15.320
11	23	Bubba Wallace	23XI Racing	Toyota	15.292	—
12	1	Ross Chastain	Trackhouse Racing	Chevrolet	15.384	—
13	54	Ty Gibbs (P)	Joe Gibbs Racing	Toyota	15.298	—
14	41	Ryan Preece	Stewart-Haas Racing	Ford	15.404	—
15	45	Tyler Reddick (P)	23XI Racing	Toyota	15.310	—
16	10	Noah Gragson	Stewart-Haas Racing	Ford	15.430	—
17	17	Chris Buescher	RFK Racing	Ford	15.319	—
18	34	Michael McDowell	Front Row Motorsports	Ford	15.434	—
19	16	A. J. Allmendinger (i)	Kaulig Racing	Chevrolet	15.356	—
20	22	Joey Logano (P)	Team Penske	Ford	15.443	—
21	31	Daniel Hemric	Kaulig Racing	Chevrolet	15.357	—
22	12	Ryan Blaney (P)	Team Penske	Ford	15.467	—
23	6	Brad Keselowski (P)	RFK Racing	Ford	15.364	—
24	38	Todd Gilliland	Front Row Motorsports	Ford	15.480	—
25	4	Josh Berry (R)	Stewart-Haas Racing	Ford	15.378	—
26	51	Justin Haley	Rick Ware Racing	Ford	15.506	—
27	2	Austin Cindric (P)	Team Penske	Ford	15.392	—
28	42	John Hunter Nemechek	Legacy Motor Club	Toyota	15.538	—
29	8	Kyle Busch	Richard Childress Racing	Chevrolet	15.393	—
30	3	Austin Dillon	Richard Childress Racing	Chevrolet	15.554	—
31	47	Ricky Stenhouse Jr.	JTG Daugherty Racing	Chevrolet	15.467	—
32	43	Erik Jones	Legacy Motor Club	Toyota	15.555	—
33	71	Zane Smith (R)	Spire Motorsports	Chevrolet	15.530	—
34	21	Harrison Burton (P)	Wood Brothers Racing	Ford	15.565	—
35	99	Daniel Suárez (P)	Hendrick Motorsports	Chevrolet	15.548	—
36	15	Kaz Grala (R)	Rick Ware Racing	Ford	15.717	—
37	66	Josh Bilicki (i)	Power Source	Ford	16.190	—
Official qualifying results

== Race ==
=== Race results ===
==== Stage results ====
Stage One Laps: 125

Pos	No	Driver	Team	Manufacturer	Points
1	5	Kyle Larson (P)	Hendrick Motorsports	Chevrolet	10
2	48	Alex Bowman (P)	Hendrick Motorsports	Chevrolet	9
3	20	Christopher Bell (P)	Joe Gibbs Racing	Toyota	8
4	19	Martin Truex Jr. (P)	Joe Gibbs Racing	Toyota	7
5	24	William Byron (P)	Hendrick Motorsports	Chevrolet	6
6	11	Denny Hamlin (P)	Joe Gibbs Racing	Toyota	5
7	14	Chase Briscoe (P)	Stewart-Haas Racing	Ford	4
8	54	Ty Gibbs (P)	Joe Gibbs Racing	Toyota	3
9	9	Chase Elliott (P)	Hendrick Motorsports	Chevrolet	2
10	23	Bubba Wallace	23XI Racing	Toyota	1
Official stage one results

Stage Two Laps: 125

Pos	No	Driver	Team	Manufacturer	Points
1	5	Kyle Larson (P)	Hendrick Motorsports	Chevrolet	10
2	19	Martin Truex Jr. (P)	Joe Gibbs Racing	Toyota	9
3	11	Denny Hamlin (P)	Joe Gibbs Racing	Toyota	8
4	45	Tyler Reddick (P)	23XI Racing	Toyota	7
5	20	Christopher Bell (P)	Joe Gibbs Racing	Toyota	6
6	23	Bubba Wallace	23XI Racing	Toyota	5
7	48	Alex Bowman (P)	Hendrick Motorsports	Chevrolet	4
8	14	Chase Briscoe (P)	Stewart-Haas Racing	Ford	3
9	12	Ryan Blaney (P)	Team Penske	Ford	2
10	9	Chase Elliott (P)	Hendrick Motorsports	Chevrolet	1
Official stage two results

=== Final Stage results ===
Stage Three Laps: 250

Pos	Grid	No	Driver	Team	Manufacturer	Laps	Points
1	2	5	Kyle Larson (P)	Hendrick Motorsports	Chevrolet	500	60
2	10	9	Chase Elliott (P)	Hendrick Motorsports	Chevrolet	500	38
3	11	23	Bubba Wallace	23XI Racing	Toyota	500	40
4	8	11	Denny Hamlin (P)	Joe Gibbs Racing	Toyota	500	46
5	6	20	Christopher Bell (P)	Joe Gibbs Racing	Toyota	500	46
6	22	12	Ryan Blaney (P)	Team Penske	Ford	500	33
7	14	41	Ryan Preece	Stewart-Haas Racing	Ford	500	30
8	5	14	Chase Briscoe (P)	Stewart-Haas Racing	Ford	500	36
9	1	48	Alex Bowman (P)	Hendrick Motorsports	Chevrolet	500	41
10	12	1	Ross Chastain	Trackhouse Racing	Chevrolet	500	27
11	18	34	Michael McDowell	Front Row Motorsports	Ford	500	26
12	16	10	Noah Gragson	Stewart-Haas Racing	Ford	499	25
13	27	2	Austin Cindric (P)	Team Penske	Ford	499	24
14	17	17	Chris Buescher	RFK Racing	Ford	499	23
15	13	54	Ty Gibbs (P)	Joe Gibbs Racing	Toyota	499	25
16	33	71	Zane Smith (R)	Spire Motorsports	Chevrolet	499	21
17	3	24	William Byron (P)	Hendrick Motorsports	Chevrolet	499	26
18	7	77	Carson Hocevar (R)	Spire Motorsports	Chevrolet	499	19
19	21	31	Daniel Hemric	Kaulig Racing	Chevrolet	499	18
20	15	45	Tyler Reddick (P)	23XI Racing	Toyota	499	24
21	30	3	Austin Dillon	Richard Childress Racing	Chevrolet	499	16
22	26	51	Justin Haley	Rick Ware Racing	Ford	499	15
23	19	16	A. J. Allmendinger (i)	Kaulig Racing	Chevrolet	499	0
24	4	19	Martin Truex Jr. (P)	Joe Gibbs Racing	Toyota	499	29
25	29	8	Kyle Busch	Richard Childress Racing	Chevrolet	498	12
26	23	6	Brad Keselowski (P)	RFK Racing	Ford	497	11
27	31	47	Ricky Stenhouse Jr.	JTG Daugherty Racing	Chevrolet	497	10
28	20	22	Joey Logano (P)	Team Penske	Ford	496	9
29	25	4	Josh Berry (R)	Stewart-Haas Racing	Ford	496	8
30	32	43	Erik Jones	Legacy Motor Club	Toyota	496	7
31	35	99	Daniel Suárez (P)	Trackhouse Racing	Chevrolet	496	6
32	24	38	Todd Gilliland	Front Row Motorsports	Ford	496	5
33	28	42	John Hunter Nemechek	Legacy Motor Club	Toyota	491	4
34	37	66	Josh Bilicki (i)	Power Source	Ford	467	0
35	34	21	Harrison Burton (P)	Wood Brothers Racing	Ford	422	2
36	9	7	Corey LaJoie	Spire Motorsports	Chevrolet	330	1
37	36	15	Kaz Grala (R)	Rick Ware Racing	Ford	296	1
Official race results

=== Race statistics ===
- Lead changes: 8 among 4 different drivers
- Cautions/Laps: 5 for 36
- Red flags: 0
- Time of race: 2 hours, 37 minutes, and 53 seconds
- Average speed: 101.277 miles per hour (162.990 km/h)

== Media ==
=== Television ===
USA covered the race on the television side. Leigh Diffey, Jeff Burton, and Steve Letarte called the race from the broadcast booth. Kim Coon, Parker Kligerman, Marty Snider, and Dillon Welch handled the pit road duties from pit lane.

USA
Booth announcers	Pit reporters
Lap-by-lap: Leigh Diffey; Color-commentator: Jeff Burton; Color-commentator: Steve Letarte	Kim Coon; Parker Kligerman; Marty Snider; Dillon Welch

=== Radio ===
PRN had the radio call for the race, which was also simulcast on Sirius XM NASCAR Radio. Doug Rice and Mark Garrow called the race from the booth when the field races down the frontstretch. Rob Albright called the race when the field races down the backstretch. Brad Gillie, Brett McMillan, Heather DeBeaux, and Wendy Venturini handled the duties on pit lane.

PRN
Booth announcers	Turn announcers	Pit reporters
Lead announcer: Doug Rice; Announcer: Mark Garrow	Backstretch: Rob Albright	Brad Gillie; Brett McMillan; Heather DeBeaux; Wendy Venturini

== Standings after the race ==
Drivers' Championship standings

	Pos	Driver	Points
7	1	Kyle Larson	3,047
1	2	Christopher Bell	3,032 (–15)
3	3	Tyler Reddick	3,028 (–19)
6	4	William Byron	3,022 (–25)
3	5	Ryan Blaney	3,019 (–28)
7	6	Denny Hamlin	3,015 (–32)
	7	Chase Elliott	3,014 (–33)
5	8	Joey Logano	3,012 (–35)
7	9	Austin Cindric	3,008 (–39)
5	10	Daniel Suárez	3,006 (–41)
7	11	Alex Bowman	3,005 (–42)
1	12	Chase Briscoe	3,005 (–42)
1	13	Ty Gibbs	2,074 (–973)
1	14	Martin Truex Jr.	2,064 (–983)
1	15	Brad Keselowski	2,048 (–999)
	16	Harrison Burton	2,031 (–1,016)
Official driver's standings

Manufacturers' Championship standings

Pos	Manufacturer	Points
1	Chevrolet	1,055
2	Ford	1,019 (–36)
3	Toyota	1,019 (–36)

- Note: Only the first 16 positions are included for the driver standings.

Previous race: 2024 Go Bowling at The Glen	NASCAR Cup Series; 2024 season	Next race: 2024 Hollywood Casino 400
