= 2023 NASCAR All-Star Race =

39th iteration of the NASCAR All-Star Race

Race details
- Date: May 21, 2023
- Location: North Wilkesboro Speedway in North Wilkesboro, North Carolina, U.S.
- Course: Permanent racing facility 0.625 mi (1.006 km)
- Distance: Open: 100 laps, 62.5 mi (100.6 km); All-Star Race: 200 Laps, 125 mi (201 km)
- Avg Speed: Open: 80.128 mph (128.954 km/h); All-Star Race: 92.612 mph (149.045 km/h)

NASCAR All Star Open
- Pole: Ty Gibbs (Joe Gibbs Racing)
- Time: 13.012
- Winner: Josh Berry (Hendrick Motorsports)
- Fan Vote winner: Noah Gragson (Legacy Motor Club)

NASCAR All-Star Race
- Pole: Daniel Suárez (Trackhouse Racing)
- Time: Heat Race 1 winner
- Most laps led: Kyle Larson (Hendrick Motorsports)
- Laps: 145
- Winner: Kyle Larson (Hendrick Motorsports)

Television
- Network: FS1
- Announcers: Mike Joy, Clint Bowyer, Darrell Waltrip (All-Star Race), Larry McReynolds (All-Star & Heat Races), and Jamie McMurray (All-Star Open)

Radio
- Network: Motor Racing Network
- Announcers: Alex Hayden, Jeff Striegle and Rusty Wallace (Booth); Dave Moody (4) (Turns)

The 2023 NASCAR All-Star Race (XXXIX) was a non-championship NASCAR Cup Series stock car exhibition race that was held on May 21, 2023, at North Wilkesboro Speedway in North Wilkesboro, North Carolina. Contested over 200 laps, it was the second exhibition race of the 2023 NASCAR Cup Series season. This event marked the first NASCAR race taking place at North Wilkesboro Speedway since the 1996 Tyson Holly Farms 400.

== Report ==
=== Background ===
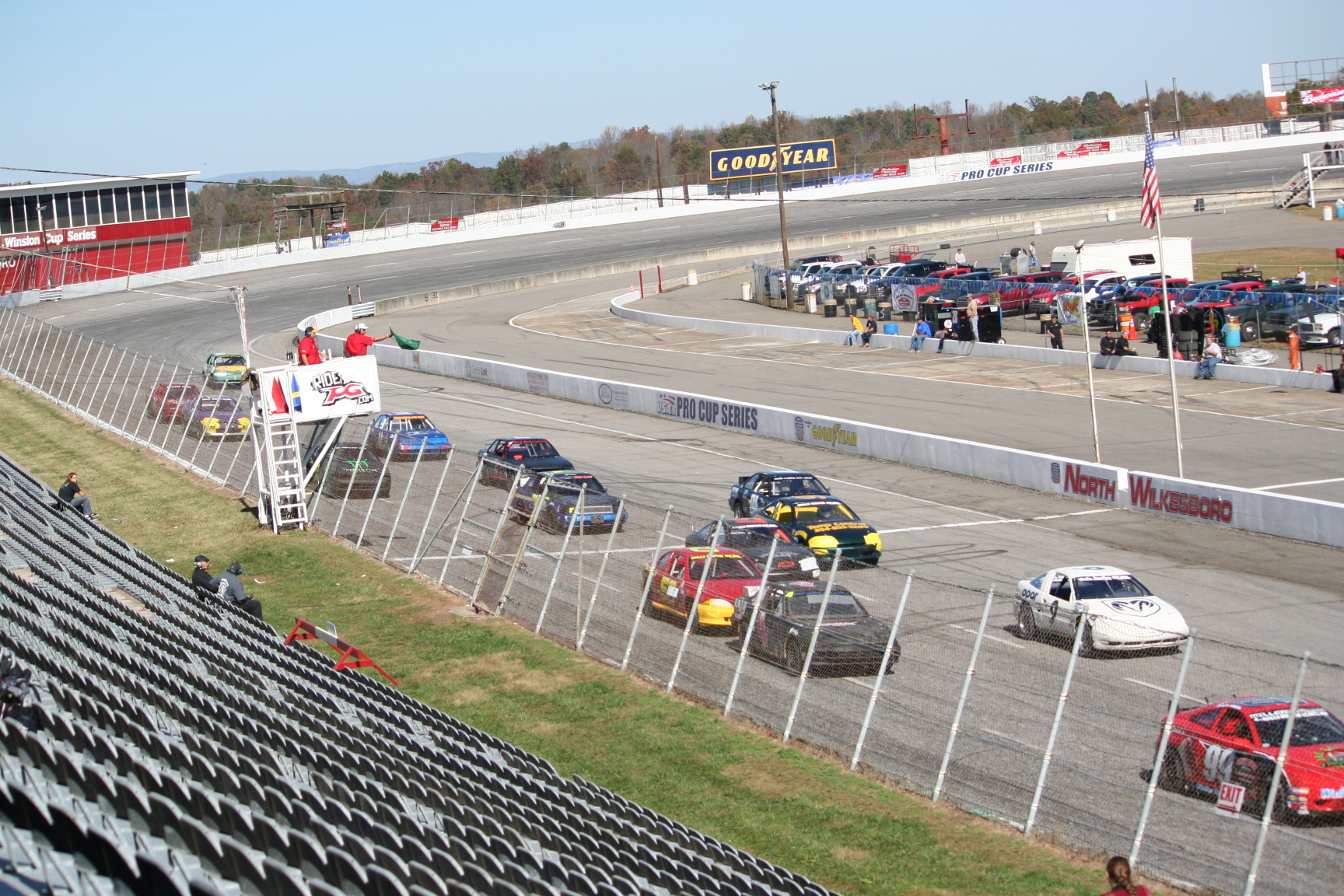
North Wilkesboro Speedway

The All-Star Race is open to race winners from last season through the 2023 Goodyear 400 at Darlington Raceway, all previous All-Star race winners, NASCAR Cup champions who had attempted to qualify for every race in 2022, the top two race finishers of the All-Star Open, and the winner of the All-Star fan vote are eligible to compete in the All-Star Race.

==== Entry list ====
- (R) denotes rookie driver.
- (i) denotes driver who is ineligible for series driver points.

===== NASCAR All Star Open =====
No.	Driver	Team	Manufacturer
7	Corey LaJoie	Spire Motorsports	Chevrolet
10	Aric Almirola	Stewart-Haas Racing	Ford
13	Chandler Smith (i)	Kaulig Racing	Chevrolet
15	J. J. Yeley	Rick Ware Racing	Ford
16	A. J. Allmendinger	Kaulig Racing	Chevrolet
21	Harrison Burton	Wood Brothers Racing	Ford
31	Justin Haley	Kaulig Racing	Chevrolet
34	Michael McDowell	Front Row Motorsports	Ford
38	Todd Gilliland	Front Row Motorsports	Ford
41	Ryan Preece	Stewart-Haas Racing	Ford
42	Noah Gragson (R)	Legacy Motor Club	Chevrolet
48	Josh Berry (i)	Hendrick Motorsports	Chevrolet
51	Ryan Newman	Rick Ware Racing	Ford
54	Ty Gibbs (R)	Joe Gibbs Racing	Toyota
77	Ty Dillon	Spire Motorsports	Chevrolet
78	Josh Bilicki	Live Fast Motorsports	Chevrolet
Official entry list

===== NASCAR All-Star Race =====
No.	Driver	Team	Manufacturer
1	Ross Chastain	Trackhouse Racing	Chevrolet
2	Austin Cindric	Team Penske	Ford
3	Austin Dillon	Richard Childress Racing	Chevrolet
5	Kyle Larson	Hendrick Motorsports	Chevrolet
6	Brad Keselowski	RFK Racing	Ford
8	Kyle Busch	Richard Childress Racing	Chevrolet
9	Chase Elliott	Hendrick Motorsports	Chevrolet
11	Denny Hamlin	Joe Gibbs Racing	Toyota
12	Ryan Blaney	Team Penske	Ford
14	Chase Briscoe	Stewart-Haas Racing	Ford
17	Chris Buescher	RFK Racing	Ford
19	Martin Truex Jr.	Joe Gibbs Racing	Toyota
20	Christopher Bell	Joe Gibbs Racing	Toyota
22	Joey Logano	Team Penske	Ford
23	Bubba Wallace	23XI Racing	Toyota
24	William Byron	Hendrick Motorsports	Chevrolet
29	Kevin Harvick	Stewart-Haas Racing	Ford
43	Erik Jones	Legacy Motor Club	Chevrolet
45	Tyler Reddick	23XI Racing	Toyota
47	Ricky Stenhouse Jr.	JTG Daugherty Racing	Chevrolet
99	Daniel Suárez	Trackhouse Racing	Chevrolet
Official entry list

== Practice ==
=== Practice results ===
Kyle Larson was the fastest in the practice session with a time of 20.615 seconds and a speed of 109.144 mph (175.650 km/h).

Pos	No.	Driver	Team	Manufacturer	Time	Speed
1	5	Kyle Larson	Hendrick Motorsports	Chevrolet	20.615	109.144
2	6	Brad Keselowski	RFK Racing	Ford	20.755	108.408
3	11	Denny Hamlin	Joe Gibbs Racing	Toyota	20.794	108.204
Official practice results

== Qualifying (Pit Crew Challenge) ==
The 2023 Pit Crew Challenge set the starting lineup for both the NASCAR All-Star Open and the qualifying heat races. Ty Gibbs scored the pole for the Open with a time of 13.012 seconds. Daniel Suárez scored the pole for Heat Race 1 with a time of 13.297 seconds. Chris Buescher scored the pole for Heat Race 2 with a time of 13.381 seconds.

=== Open qualifying results ===
Pos	No.	Driver	Team	Manufacturer	Time
1	54	Ty Gibbs (R)	Joe Gibbs Racing	Toyota	13.012
2	48	Josh Berry (i)	Hendrick Motorsports	Chevrolet	13.677
3	7	Corey LaJoie	Spire Motorsports	Chevrolet	13.911
4	21	Harrison Burton	Wood Brothers Racing	Ford	14.091
5	31	Justin Haley	Kaulig Racing	Chevrolet	14.294
6	34	Michael McDowell	Front Row Motorsports	Ford	14.509
7	38	Todd Gilliland	Front Row Motorsports	Ford	14.707
8	41	Ryan Preece	Stewart-Haas Racing	Ford	14.760
9	10	Aric Almirola	Stewart-Haas Racing	Ford	14.776
10	16	A. J. Allmendinger	Kaulig Racing	Chevrolet	15.796
11	78	Josh Bilicki (i)	Live Fast Motorsports	Chevrolet	18.281
12	77	Ty Dillon	Spire Motorsports	Chevrolet	18.447
13	13	Chandler Smith (i)	Kaulig Racing	Chevrolet	19.004
14	51	Ryan Newman	Rick Ware Racing	Ford	20.300
15	42	Noah Gragson (R)	Legacy Motor Club	Chevrolet	20.886
16	15	J. J. Yeley	Rick Ware Racing	Ford	21.066
Official Open qualifying results

=== Heat Race 1 qualifying results ===
Pos	No.	Driver	Team	Manufacturer	Time
1	99	Daniel Suárez	Trackhouse Racing	Chevrolet	13.297
2	9	Chase Elliott	Hendrick Motorsports	Chevrolet	13.572
3	22	Joey Logano	Team Penske	Ford	13.835
4	11	Denny Hamlin	Joe Gibbs Racing	Toyota	14.089
5	14	Chase Briscoe	Stewart-Haas Racing	Ford	14.674
6	47	Ricky Stenhouse Jr.	JTG Daugherty Racing	Chevrolet	15.063
7	2	Austin Cindric	Team Penske	Ford	15.154
8	29	Kevin Harvick	Stewart-Haas Racing	Ford	15.579
9	12	Ryan Blaney	Team Penske	Ford	18.819
10	20	Christopher Bell	Joe Gibbs Racing	Toyota	20.064
11	43	Erik Jones	Legacy Motor Club	Chevrolet	21.359
Heat Race 1 qualifying results

=== Heat Race 2 qualifying results ===
Pos	No.	Driver	Team	Manufacturer	Time
1	17	Chris Buescher	RFK Racing	Ford	13.381
2	3	Austin Dillon	Richard Childress Racing	Chevrolet	13.712
3	24	William Byron	Hendrick Motorsports	Chevrolet	13.867
4	1	Ross Chastain	Trackhouse Racing	Chevrolet	14.373
5	5	Kyle Larson	Hendrick Motorsports	Chevrolet	14.697
6	19	Martin Truex Jr.	Joe Gibbs Racing	Toyota	15.115
7	23	Bubba Wallace	23XI Racing	Toyota	15.167
8	6	Brad Keselowski	RFK Racing	Ford	18.044
9	8	Kyle Busch	Richard Childress Racing	Chevrolet	19.531
10	45	Tyler Reddick	23XI Racing	Toyota	21.034
Heat Race 2 qualifying results

== Qualifying heat races ==
For the first time in NASCAR Cup Series history, an oval race was conducted in the rain when the first heat race took place in inclement weather. Cars used rain tires for the first heat, and the second race started dry, but teams switched to rain tires during the race.

=== Race 1 ===
Pos	Grid	No	Driver	Team	Manufacturer	Laps
1	1	99	Daniel Suárez	Trackhouse Racing	Chevrolet	60
2	3	22	Joey Logano	Team Penske	Ford	60
3	5	14	Chase Briscoe	Stewart-Haas Racing	Ford	60
4	10	20	Christopher Bell	Joe Gibbs Racing	Toyota	60
5	4	11	Denny Hamlin	Joe Gibbs Racing	Toyota	60
6	9	12	Ryan Blaney	Team Penske	Ford	60
7	2	9	Chase Elliott	Hendrick Motorsports	Chevrolet	60
8	8	29	Kevin Harvick	Stewart-Haas Racing	Ford	60
9	7	2	Austin Cindric	Team Penske	Ford	60
10	6	47	Ricky Stenhouse Jr.	JTG Daugherty Racing	Chevrolet	60
11	11	43	Erik Jones	Legacy Motor Club	Chevrolet	60
Official race one results

=== Race 2 ===
Pos	Grid	No	Driver	Team	Manufacturer	Laps
1	1	17	Chris Buescher	RFK Racing	Ford	60
2	2	3	Austin Dillon	Richard Childress Racing	Chevrolet	60
3	3	24	William Byron	Hendrick Motorsports	Chevrolet	60
4	8	6	Brad Keselowski	RFK Racing	Ford	60
5	7	23	Bubba Wallace	23XI Racing	Toyota	60
6	6	19	Martin Truex Jr.	Joe Gibbs Racing	Toyota	60
7	9	8	Kyle Busch	Richard Childress Racing	Chevrolet	60
8	5	5	Kyle Larson	Hendrick Motorsports	Chevrolet	60
9	4	1	Ross Chastain	Trackhouse Racing	Chevrolet	60
10	10	45	Tyler Reddick	23XI Racing	Toyota	60
Official race two results

=== NASCAR All-Star Race Starting Lineup ===
Pos	No.	Driver	Team	Manufacturer	Notes
1	99	Daniel Suárez	Trackhouse Racing	Chevrolet	Heat Race 1 Winner
2	17	Chris Buescher	RFK Racing	Ford	Heat Race 2 Winner
3	22	Joey Logano	Team Penske	Ford	Second in Heat Race 1
4	3	Austin Dillon	Richard Childress Racing	Chevrolet	Second in Heat Race 2
5	14	Chase Briscoe	Stewart-Haas Racing	Ford	Third in Heat Race 1
6	24	William Byron	Hendrick Motorsports	Chevrolet	Third in Heat Race 2
7	20	Christopher Bell	Joe Gibbs Racing	Toyota	Fourth in Heat Race 1
8	6	Brad Keselowski	RFK Racing	Ford	Fourth in Heat Race 2
9	11	Denny Hamlin	Joe Gibbs Racing	Toyota	Fifth in Heat Race 1
10	23	Bubba Wallace	23XI Racing	Toyota	Fifth in Heat Race 2
11	12	Ryan Blaney	Team Penske	Ford	Sixth in Heat Race 1
12	19	Martin Truex Jr.	Joe Gibbs Racing	Toyota	Sixth in Heart Race 2
13	9	Chase Elliott	Hendrick Motorsports	Chevrolet	Seventh in Heat Race 1
14	8	Kyle Busch	Richard Childress Racing	Chevrolet	Seventh in Heat Race 2
15	29	Kevin Harvick	Stewart-Haas Racing	Ford	Eighth in Heat Race 1
16	5	Kyle Larson	Hendrick Motorsports	Chevrolet	Eighth in Heat Race 2
17	2	Austin Cindric	Team Penske	Ford	Ninth in Heat Race 1
18	1	Ross Chastain	Trackhouse Racing	Chevrolet	Ninth in Heat Race 2
19	47	Ricky Stenhouse Jr.	JTG Daugherty Racing	Chevrolet	Tenth in Heat Race 1
20	45	Tyler Reddick	23XI Racing	Toyota	Tenth in Heat Race 2
21	43	Erik Jones	Legacy Motor Club	Chevrolet	Eleventh in Heat Race 1
22	48	Josh Berry (i)	Hendrick Motorsports	Chevrolet	All-Star Open Winner
23	54	Ty Gibbs (R)	Joe Gibbs Racing	Toyota	All-Star Open Runner-Up
24	42	Noah Gragson (R)	Legacy Motor Club	Chevrolet	Fan Vote Winner
Official starting lineup

== NASCAR All Star Open ==
=== NASCAR All Star Open results ===
Pos	Grid	No	Driver	Team	Manufacturer	Laps
1	2	48	Josh Berry (i)	Hendrick Motorsports	Chevrolet	100
2	1	54	Ty Gibbs (R)	Joe Gibbs Racing	Toyota	100
3	9	10	Aric Almirola	Stewart-Haas Racing	Ford	100
4	8	41	Ryan Preece	Stewart-Haas Racing	Ford	100
5	10	16	A. J. Allmendinger	Kaulig Racing	Chevrolet	100
6	16	15	J. J. Yeley (i)	Rick Ware Racing	Ford	100
7	15	42	Noah Gragson (R)	Legacy Motor Club	Chevrolet	100
8	12	77	Ty Dillon	Spire Motorsports	Chevrolet	100
9	3	7	Corey LaJoie	Spire Motorsports	Chevrolet	100
10	11	78	Josh Bilicki (i)	Live Fast Motorsports	Chevrolet	100
11	4	21	Harrison Burton	Wood Brothers Racing	Ford	100
12	14	51	Ryan Newman	Rick Ware Racing	Ford	97
13	6	34	Michael McDowell	Front Row Motorsports	Ford	97
14	5	31	Justin Haley	Kaulig Racing	Chevrolet	58
15	7	38	Todd Gilliland	Front Row Motorsports	Ford	52
16	13	13	Chandler Smith (i)	Kaulig Racing	Chevrolet	49
Official NASCAR All Star Open race results

== NASCAR All Star Race ==
=== NASCAR All Star Race results ===
Pos	Grid	No	Driver	Team	Manufacturer	Laps
1	16	5	Kyle Larson	Hendrick Motorsports	Chevrolet	200
2	10	23	Bubba Wallace	23XI Racing	Toyota	200
3	20	45	Tyler Reddick	23XI Racing	Toyota	200
4	5	14	Chase Briscoe	Stewart-Haas Racing	Ford	200
5	13	9	Chase Elliott	Hendrick Motorsports	Chevrolet	200
6	11	12	Ryan Blaney	Team Penske	Ford	200
7	1	99	Daniel Suárez	Trackhouse Racing	Chevrolet	200
8	21	43	Erik Jones	Legacy Motor Club	Chevrolet	200
9	23	54	Ty Gibbs (R)	Joe Gibbs Racing	Toyota	200
10	3	22	Joey Logano	Team Penske	Ford	200
11	18	1	Ross Chastain	Trackhouse Racing	Chevrolet	200
12	7	20	Christopher Bell	Joe Gibbs Racing	Toyota	200
13	9	11	Denny Hamlin	Joe Gibbs Racing	Toyota	199
14	12	19	Martin Truex Jr.	Joe Gibbs Racing	Toyota	199
15	22	48	Josh Berry (i)	Hendrick Motorsports	Chevrolet	199
16	2	17	Chris Buescher	RFK Racing	Ford	199
17	4	3	Austin Dillon	Richard Childress Racing	Chevrolet	199
18	15	29	Kevin Harvick	Stewart-Haas Racing	Ford	198
19	8	6	Brad Keselowski	RFK Racing	Ford	198
20	6	24	William Byron	Hendrick Motorsports	Chevrolet	198
21	17	2	Austin Cindric	Team Penske	Ford	198
22	14	8	Kyle Busch	Richard Childress Racing	Chevrolet	198
23	24	42	Noah Gragson (R)	Legacy Motor Club	Chevrolet	197
24	19	47	Ricky Stenhouse Jr.	JTG Daugherty Racing	Chevrolet	196
Official NASCAR All-Star Race results

== Media ==
=== Television ===
Fox Sports was the television broadcaster of the race in the United States. Lap-by-lap announcer, Mike Joy, Clint Bowyer, 1985 All-Star Race winner Darrell Waltrip (driver), and 1991 and 1992 All-Star Race winner Larry McReynolds (crew chief) called the race from the broadcast booth. Jamie Little, Regan Smith and Josh Sims handled the pit road for the television side.

FS1
Booth announcers	Pit reporters
Lap-by-lap: Mike Joy; Color-commentator: Clint Bowyer; Color-commentator (All-Star Race): Darrell Waltrip; Color-commentator (All-Star & Heat Races): Larry McReynolds; Color-commentator (All-Star Open): Jamie McMurray	Jamie Little; Regan Smith; Josh Sims

=== Radio ===
Motor Racing Network (MRN) continued their longstanding relationship with Speedway Motorsports to broadcast the race on radio. The lead announcers for the race's broadcast were Alex Hayden, Jeff Striegle, and 1989 winner of the All-Star Race Rusty Wallace. The network also had one announcer stationed in turn 4: Dave Moody. Steve Post and Kim Coon were the network's pit lane reporters. The network's broadcast was also simulcasted on Sirius XM NASCAR Radio.

MRN Radio
Booth announcers	Turn announcers	Pit reporters
Lead announcer: Alex Hayden; Announcer: Jeff Striegle; Announcer: Rusty Wallace	Turn 4: Dave Moody	Steve Post; Kim Coon
