= Josh Berry =

American racing driver (born 1990)

- Berry at Las Vegas Motor Speedway in 2026
- Born: Joshua William Berry; October 22, 1990 (age 36); Hendersonville, Tennessee, U.S.
- Achievements: All-Time Wins Leader in the CARS Tour overall and CARS Late Model Stock Tour (22); 2020 NASCAR Advance Auto Parts Weekly Series Champion; 2017 CARS Late Model Stock Tour Champion; 2016 Fall Brawl Winner (LMSC); 2017 Myrtle Beach 400 Winner; 2017 Bobby Isaac Memorial Winner; 2018, 2021 Throwback 276 Winner (LMSC); 2019 ValleyStar Credit Union 300 Winner; 2020 NASCAR Local Racing Series Champion; 2020, 2021 Old North State Nationals Winner; 2021 Hampton Heat 200 Winner; 2021, 2022 Thanksgiving All-Star Classic 150 Winner; 2021 Battle Of The Stars Winner; 2022 Icebreaker 125 Winner; 2022 Jack Ingram Memorial Winner; 2023 NASCAR All-Star Race Open winner

NASCAR Cup Series career
- 120 races run over 5 years
- Car no., team: No. 42 (Legacy Motor Club)
- 2026 position: 22nd
- Best finish: 16th (2025)
- First race: 2021 Drydene 400 (Dover)
- Last race: 2026 Season Finale 400 (Homestead)
- First win: 2025 Pennzoil 400 (Las Vegas)
Wins	Top tens	Poles
1	26	0

NASCAR O'Reilly Auto Parts Series career
- 97 races run over 8 years
- 2024 position: 104th
- Best finish: 4th (2022)
- First race: 2014 U.S. Cellular 250 (Iowa)
- Last race: 2024 Pennzoil 250 (Indianapolis)
- First win: 2021 Cook Out 250 (Martinsville)
- Last win: 2022 Alsco Uniforms 302 (Las Vegas)
Wins	Top tens	Poles
5	52	4

NASCAR FedEx Freight Truck Series career
- 11 races run over 2 years
- 2021 position: 102nd
- Best finish: 92nd (2016)
- First race: 2016 American Ethanol E15 225 (Chicagoland)
- Last race: 2021 United Rentals 200 (Martinsville)
Wins	Top tens	Poles
0	1	0

ARCA Menards Series career
- 2 races run over 2 years
- Best finish: 74th (2018)
- First race: 2018 Kentuckiana Ford Dealers 200 (Salem)
- Last race: 2022 General Tire 150 (Phoenix)
Wins	Top tens	Poles
0	2	0

ARCA Menards Series East career
- 4 races run over 3 years
- Best finish: 31st (2019)
- First race: 2014 Kevin Whitaker Chevrolet 150 (Greenville)
- Last race: 2021 General Tire 125 (Dover)
Wins	Top tens	Poles
0	2	0

ARCA Menards Series West career
- 1 race run over 1 year
- Best finish: 53rd (2022)
- First race: 2022 General Tire 150 (Phoenix)
Wins	Top tens	Poles
0	1	0
- Statistics up to date as of November 8, 2026.

Joshua William Berry (born October 22, 1990) is an American professional stock car racing driver. He competes full-time in the NASCAR Cup Series, driving the No. 42 Toyota Camry XSE for Legacy Motor Club. Berry is noted for getting his start as a standout in Late Model Stock Cars with JR Motorsports from 2010 to 2023, where he became the all-time winningest driver in CARS Tour history.

== Racing career ==
=== Early career and late model racing ===
Berry met his future car owner Dale Earnhardt Jr. in 2008 when competing in an online sim racing league called DMP Online Racing. At the time, he was racing Legend Cars at his home track of the Nashville Fairgrounds Speedway in Nashville while also attending Volunteer State Community College and working as a bank teller to fund his racing career. Earnhardt Jr. then signed Berry to his JR Motorsports team in 2010 to compete in late model racing.

At the 2015 Denny Hamlin Short Track Showdown, Berry spun Lee Pulliam while racing him and Timothy Peters for the lead on the final lap; Berry was moved down to seventeenth in the running order and drew criticism from Pulliam, who called Berry "the biggest joke in racing." After being spun by Bobby McCarty in CARS Tour at Motor Mile Speedway in 2019 and Ace Speedway in 2020, both times when Berry was leading the race, Berry intentionally wrecked McCarty later in the Ace Speedway race, resulting in a one-race suspension. Berry ditched a planned CARS schedule and instead focused on the NASCAR Advance Auto Parts Weekly Series, winning 24 races en route to a national championship.

On August 31, 2022, Berry was the crew chief for Dale Earnhardt Jr. in the CARS Tour Window World 125 late model race at North Wilkesboro Speedway and on May 17, 2023, again for the race at North Wilkesboro Speedway the following season.

=== NASCAR and ARCA ===
==== 2014–2021 ====
Berry's first NASCAR Xfinity Series race came at Iowa Speedway, driving the No. 5 Chevrolet Camaro for JR Motorsports. He started tenth and finished twelfth, finishing on the lead lap. He returned to the 5 car for the season finale at Homestead–Miami Speedway, again logging a lead-lap finish in 25th. He finished his debut season 50th in points. He returned to JR Motorsports for one race in 2015, finishing seventh at Richmond International Raceway. In 2016, his first race of the season was at Iowa, where he finished ninth in the No. 88 for JR Motorsports. He returned to that car in the first race of the Xfinity Series Playoffs, at Kentucky Speedway and ended up finishing thirteenth. Berry also made one start for Obaika Racing, finishing 27th at Darlington Raceway. Berry also debuted in the NASCAR Camping World Truck Series during the 2016 season, driving the No. 71 Contreras Motorsports truck to a thirteenth-place finish at Chicagoland Speedway.

In 2017, Berry made his first Xfinity Series start of the season, attempting the Kansas race for newly-formed NextGen Motorsports, driving their No. 55 Toyota. After qualifying 33rd, he finished 34th after suffering an engine failure on lap 182.

In 2018, Berry made his debut in the ARCA Racing Series, driving for Chad Bryant Racing in their No. 22 Ford at Salem Speedway in April of that year, finishing fourth. In 2019, he drove for Visconti Motorsports and finished third in their No. 74 car in the NASCAR K&N Pro Series East race at New Hampshire in September, which was his first start in that series. These were his only starts in NASCAR or ARCA in both of these years.

==== 2021 ====
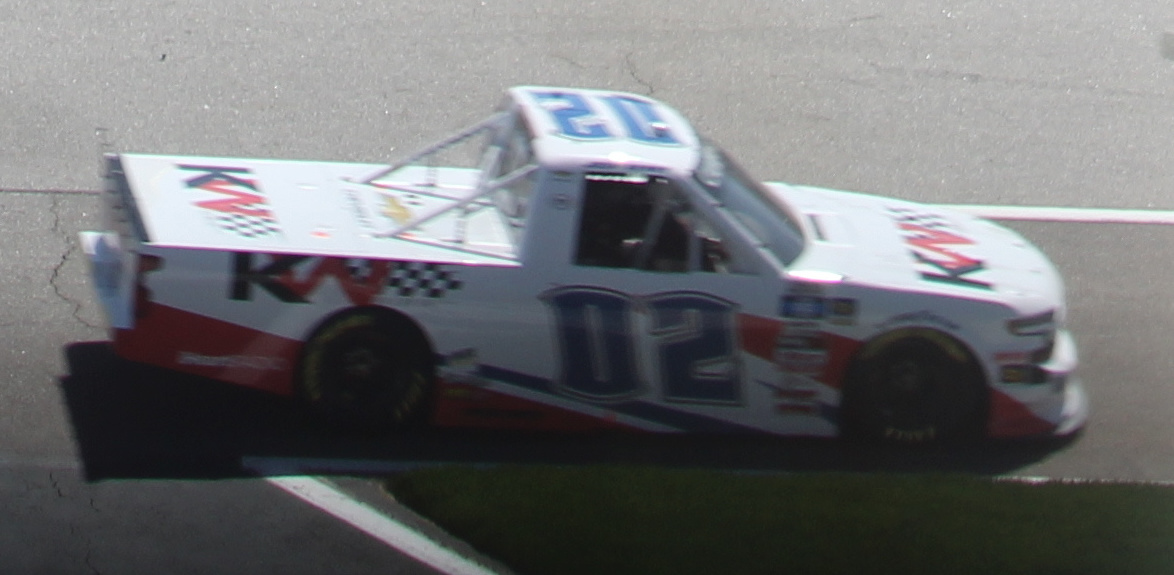
Berry in the No. 02 truck for Young's Motorsports at Atlanta in 2021

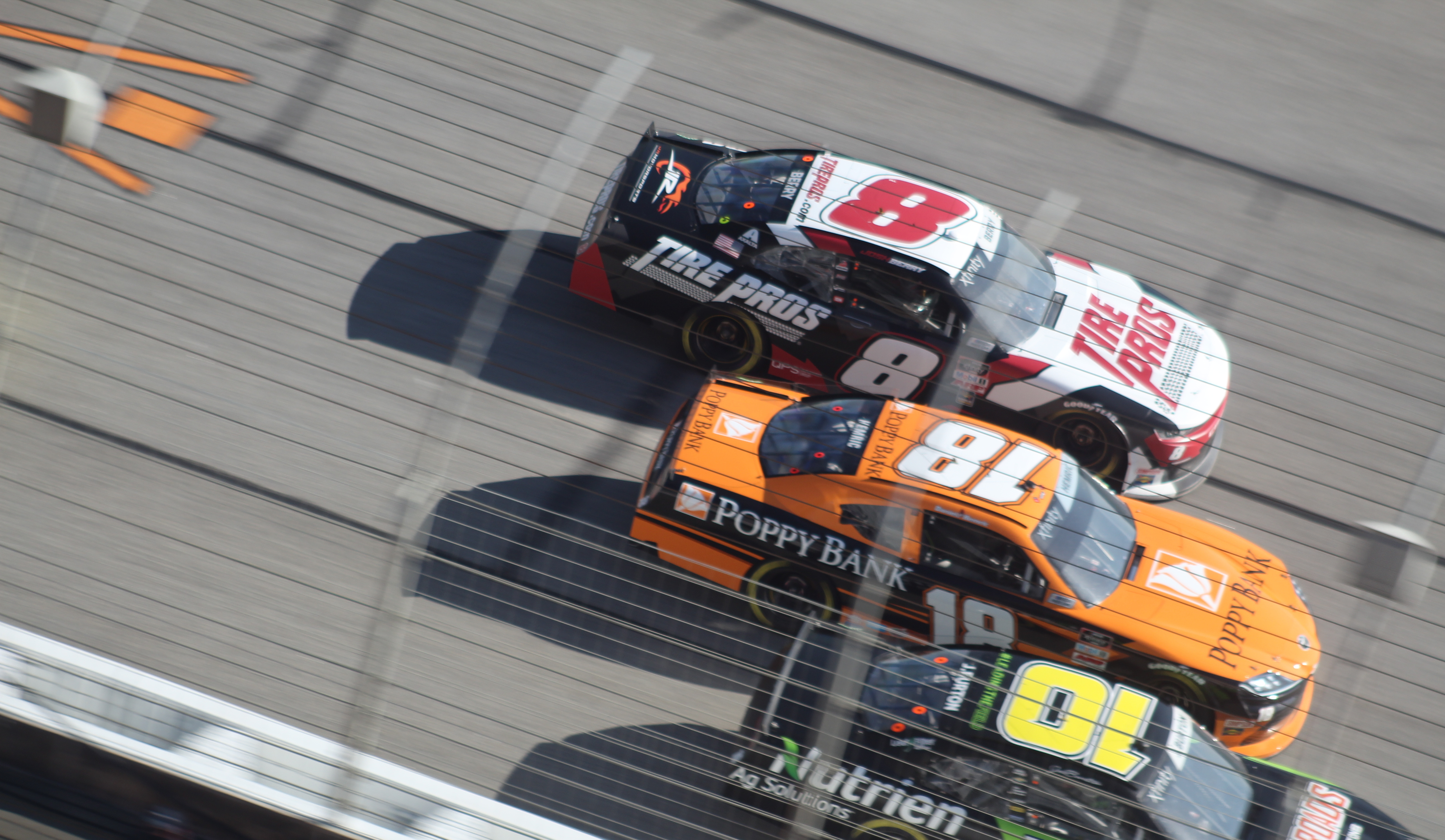
Berry (No. 8) racing Daniel Hemric (No. 18) and Jeb Burton (No. 10) at Atlanta in March 2021

On October 22, 2020, JR Motorsports announced that it had scheduled Berry to drive its No. 8 car for 12 races in the 2021 NASCAR Xfinity Series season. At Phoenix Raceway, Berry was turned by Santino Ferrucci, prompting him to give Ferrucci double middle fingers as he drove by. He recorded his first Xfinity win at Martinsville upon passing Ty Gibbs for the lead with 28 laps remaining; Berry was the fifth driver to win his maiden race in the series at Martinsville alongside Sam Ard (1982), Brett Bodine (1985), Brad Teague (1987) and Jeff Burton (1990).

In March, Berry returned to the Truck Series for the first time since 2016. He substituted for Kris Wright in the No. 02 for Young's Motorsports after Wright tested positive for COVID-19.

In May, Berry made his NASCAR Cup Series debut in the Drydene 400 at Dover International Speedway, substituting for Justin Haley in the Spire Motorsports No. 77 car after Haley was sidelined by COVID-19 protocols, marking the second time that Berry was called on to fill in for a driver that had to miss a race because of COVID-19. He also drove in his second ARCA Menards Series East (formerly NASCAR K&N Pro Series East) race that weekend in the No. 41 for Cook-Finley Racing, which meant that he did triple duty that weekend at Dover. On May 26, it was announced that Berry would get to compete in the Xfinity Series race at Mid-Ohio road course in the No. 31 for Jordan Anderson Racing. Miguel Paludo was driving Berry's normal car, the No. 8 for JR Motorsports, in this race.

Another Truck return came in June in the No. 25 of Rackley W.A.R. for three races at Texas, Nashville, and Pocono after the departure of Timothy Peters. A month later, he rejoined JRM for the Xfinity race at Loudon in the No. 1 after Michael Annett suffered a leg injury.

On August 16, Berry was confirmed to drive the No. 8 for JR Motorsports full-time in 2022. Later in the week, he filled in for Spire's other Cup driver Corey LaJoie at Michigan when LaJoie was not allowed to compete, again due to COVID-19 protocols. When Annett was re-injured in September, Berry once again took over as replacement at Bristol and Las Vegas, and he won the latter after passing teammate Justin Allgaier with under twenty laps to go.

==== 2022 ====
Berry began the 2022 season with a sixteenth-place finish at Daytona. He scored wins at Dover and Charlotte to make the playoffs. During the playoffs, Berry won at Las Vegas to make the Championship 4. Berry would ultimately finish fourth in the final points standings.

==== 2023 ====
During the 2023 season, Berry drove winless but stayed consistent enough to make the playoffs. He was eliminated at the conclusion of the Charlotte Roval race.

On March 3, it was announced that Berry would run the Hendrick Motorsports No. 9 at the Las Vegas Cup race after Chase Elliott sustained a leg injury from snowboarding in Colorado. Berry finished 10th the following week in the Cup Series race at Phoenix, and filled in for the next three oval races until Elliott recovered to return at Martinsville. Berry finished second at Richmond, his career best in the Cup Series up to that point. On April 26, Berry was announced as the substitute driver of the No. 48 after Alex Bowman suffered a back injury from a sprint car racing accident. On May 21, he raced in the 2023 NASCAR All-Star Race in place of Bowman, qualifying first place in the open qualifying race, allowing him to compete in the main race, where he finished fifteenth. He would then be announced as the driver for Legacy Motor Club in the No. 42 at Michigan after Noah Gragson was suspended indefinitely. He would go on to finish 34th after being involved in a crash while running sixteenth.

==== 2024: Stewart–Haas Racing ====
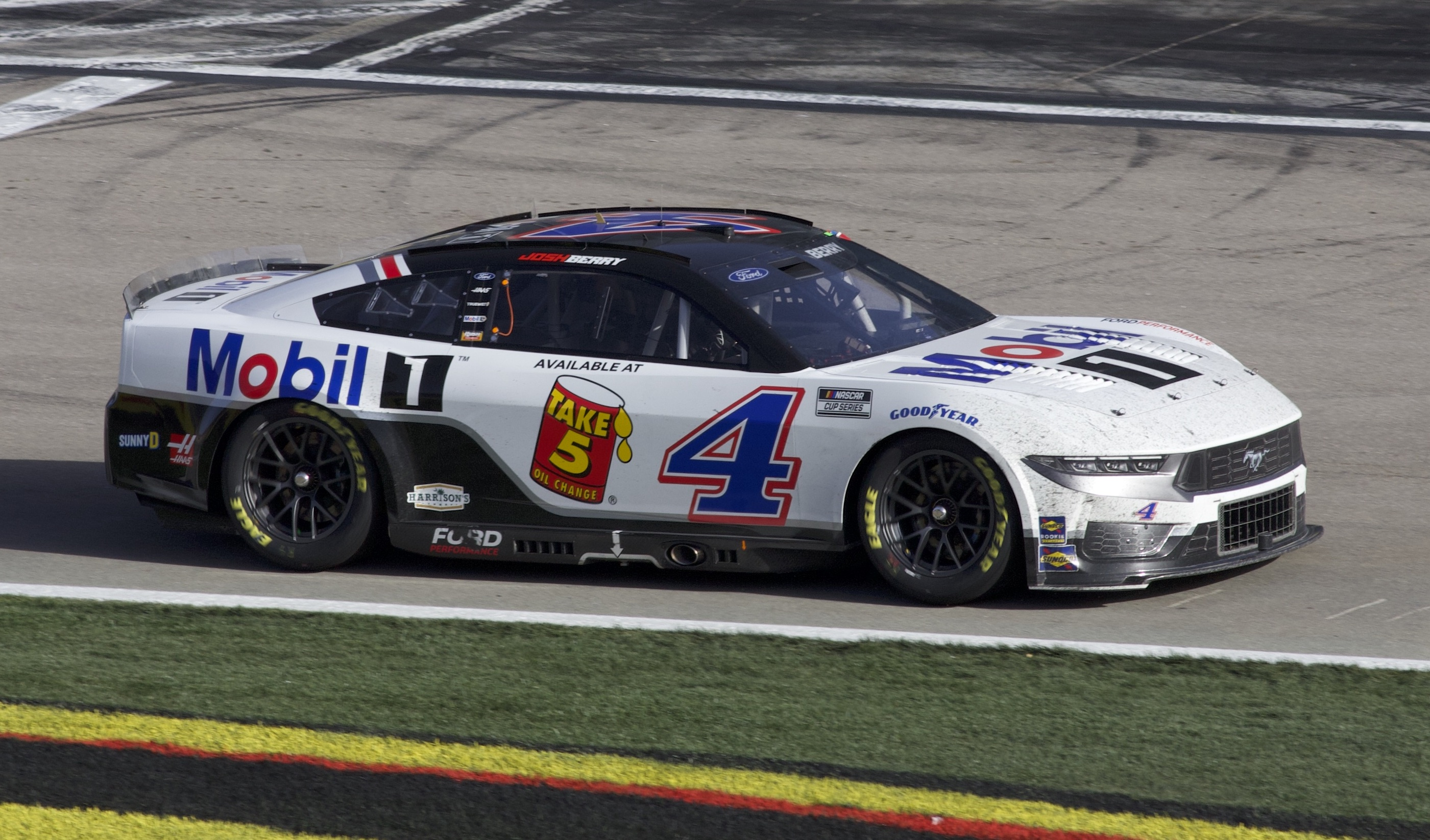
Berry's No. 4 car at Las Vegas Motor Speedway in 2024

On June 21, 2023, Stewart–Haas Racing signed Berry as Kevin Harvick's replacement in the No. 4 in 2024. Berry started the season with a 25th place finish at the 2024 Daytona 500. He scored a season-best third-place finish at Darlington and New Hampshire.

On May 28, 2024, Stewart–Haas Racing announced it would shut down its NASCAR operations at the end of the season.

In the Xfinity Series, Berry signed to drive the AM Racing No. 15 at Pocono.

During the 2024 Coke Zero Sugar 400, Berry was involved in a major crash on lap 159. While leading the second lane down the backstretch, Austin Cindric was turned up the track following a push from behind. Cindric and Berry both spun towards the inside as a multi-car incident ensued behind. Berry's car lifted off the ground, overturned, and slid on its roof at high speed for several seconds. Still upside down, it impacted the inside wall head-on, sending it into a spin before it finally stopped on the apron of the track. After track safety workers righted the overturned car, Berry exited unharmed. Thought of a very similar nature arose to a crash suffered by Ryan Preece in the previous year's running, Berry's car did not barrel roll, due likely to the updates to the track following the former's incident that saw the grass in the area removed and replaced with pavement. The flip happened in spite of an additional air deflector implemented in the intervening week after Corey LaJoie had a similar crash at Michigan the previous race, intended to prevent cars from lifting off the ground.

==== 2025: Wood Brothers Racing, first career win, and playoff collapse ====
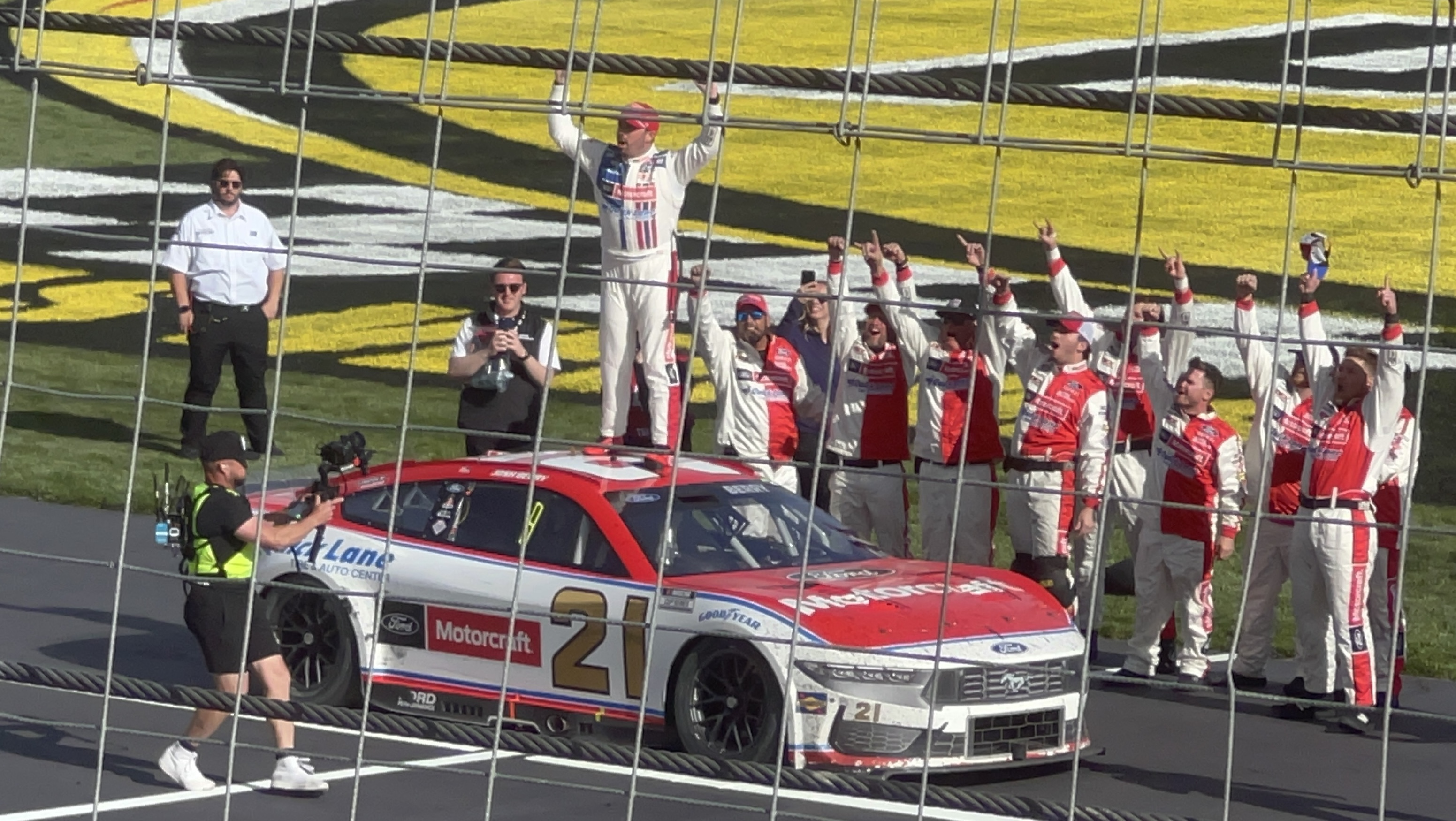
Berry celebrating after winning the 2025 Pennzoil 400 at Las Vegas Motor Speedway

On July 3, 2024, Berry signed a multi-year deal with Wood Brothers Racing to drive the No. 21 car, replacing Harrison Burton. He started the 2025 season with a 37th place DNF at the 2025 Daytona 500. About a month later, with a fourth-place finish, it was the first time that the Wood Brothers finished inside the top five at Phoenix. The next week, Berry scored his first career Cup Series win at Las Vegas after passing and pulling away from Daniel Suárez. This win marked the first time since the 1986 and 1987 seasons that the Wood Brothers won in back to back seasons (both won with Kyle Petty). After a string of back-to-back-to-back last place finishes at Darlington, Gateway, and Bristol, Berry was eliminated at the conclusion of the round of 16.

==== 2026: Final season with Wood Brothers Racing ====
Berry's No. 21 at Las Vegas Motor Speedway

He started the 2026 season with a 9th place finish at the 2026 Daytona 500. On June 10, Berry announced that he would not return to the Wood Brothers Racing in 2027, with Jesse Love was announced as his replacement. With an unforeseeable future for 2027, he went on a summer-streak of consistent top-ten finishes.

==== 2027: Fresh beginnings with Legacy Motor Club ====
On September 8, 2026, it was announced that Berry signed a multi-year contract with Legacy Motor Club to drive their No. 42 in replacement for John Hunter Nemechek.

== Personal life ==
Berry worked as a bank teller before his racing career provided a steady income. He is a graduate of Volunteer State Community College. Berry is a former classmate of two-time Indianapolis 500 winner Josef Newgarden in the 7th and 8th grades. He also attended the same high school at the same time as Taylor Swift.

== Motorsports career results ==
=== Stock car career summary ===
Season	Series	Team	Races	Wins	Top 5	Top 10	Points	Position
2014	NASCAR Nationwide Series	JR Motorsports	2	0	0	0	51	50th
2014	NASCAR K&N Pro Series East	Darin Odle	2	0	0	0	47	47th
2015	NASCAR Xfinity Series	JR Motorsports	1	0	0	1	37	60th
2016	NASCAR Xfinity Series	JR Motorsports	2	0	0	1	74	41st
2016	NASCAR Xfinity Series	Obaika Racing	1	0	0	0	74	41st
2016	NASCAR Truck Series	Contreras Motorsports	1	0	0	0	0	NC†
2017	NASCAR Xfinity Series	NextGen Motorsports	1	0	0	0	3	80th
2018	ARCA Racing Series	Chad Bryant Racing	1	0	1	1	215	74th
2019	NASCAR K&N Pro Series East	Visconti Motorsports	1	0	1	1	41	31st
2021	NASCAR Cup Series	Spire Motorsports	2	0	0	0	0	NC†
2021	NASCAR Xfinity Series	JR Motorsports	12	1	4	6	540	17th
2021	NASCAR Xfinity Series	Jordan Anderson Racing	5	0	0	2	540	17th
2021	NASCAR Xfinity Series	JR Motorsports	5	1	2	4	540	17th
2021	NASCAR Truck Series	Young's Motorsports	1	0	0	0	0	NC†
2021	NASCAR Truck Series	Rackley W.A.R.	9	0	0	1	0	NC†
2021	ARCA Menards Series East	Cook-Finley Racing	1	0	1	1	42	33rd
2022	NASCAR Xfinity Series	JR Motorsports	33	3	11	20	4024	4th
2022	ARCA Menards Series	McGowan Motorsports	1	0	0	1	36	80th
2022	ARCA Menards Series West	McGowan Motorsports	1	0	0	1	36	53rd
2023	NASCAR Cup Series	Hendrick Motorsports	8	0	1	3	0	NC†
2023	NASCAR Cup Series	Legacy Motor Club	2	0	0	0	0	NC†
2023	NASCAR Xfinity Series	JR Motorsports	33	0	11	18	2172	11th
2024	NASCAR Cup Series	Stewart–Haas Racing	36	0	2	4	579	27th
2024	NASCAR Xfinity Series	AM Racing	2	0	0	0	0	NC†
2025	NASCAR Cup Series	Wood Brothers Racing	36	1	3	8	2150	16th
2026	NASCAR Cup Series	Wood Brothers Racing	36	0	4	11	651	22nd

^{†} As Berry was a guest driver, he was ineligible for championship points.

=== NASCAR ===
(key) (Bold – Pole position awarded by qualifying time. Italics – Pole position earned by points standings or practice time. * – Most laps led.)

==== Cup Series ====
NASCAR Cup Series results
Year	Team	No.	Make	1	2	3	4	5	6	7	8	9	10	11	12	13	14	15	16	17	18	19	20	21	22	23	24	25	26	27	28	29	30	31	32	33	34	35	36	NCSC	Pts	Ref
2021	Spire Motorsports	77	Chevy	DAY	DRC	HOM	LVS	PHO	ATL	BRD	MAR	RCH	TAL	KAN	DAR	DOV; 30	COA	CLT	SON	NSH	POC	POC	ROA	ATL	NHA	GLN	IRC													60th	0^{1}	
2021	Spire Motorsports	7	Chevy																									MCH; 26	DAY	DAR	RCH	BRI	LVS	TAL	ROV	TEX	KAN	MAR	PHO	60th	0^{1}	
2023	Hendrick Motorsports	9	Chevy	DAY	CAL	LVS; 29	PHO; 10	ATL; 18	COA	RCH; 2	BRD; 27	MAR	TAL																											43rd	0^{1}	
2023	Hendrick Motorsports	48	Chevy											DOV; 10	KAN; 25	DAR; 30	CLT	GTW	SON	NSH	CSC	ATL	NHA	POC	RCH															43rd	0^{1}	
2023	Legacy Motor Club	42	Chevy																							MCH; 34	IRC	GLN	DAY; 22	DAR	KAN	BRI	TEX	TAL	ROV	LVS	HOM	MAR	PHO	43rd	0^{1}	
2024	Stewart–Haas Racing	4	Ford	DAY; 25	ATL; 29	LVS; 20	PHO; 26	BRI; 12	COA; 35	RCH; 11	MAR; 25	TEX; 36	TAL; 16	DOV; 14	KAN; 15	DAR; 3	CLT; 10	GTW; 36	SON; 32	IOW; 7	NHA; 3	NSH; 26	CSC; 36	POC; 20	IND; 35	RCH; 14	MCH; 22	DAY; 26	DAR; 31	ATL; 28	GLN; 25	BRI; 29	KAN; 38	TAL; 36	ROV; 22	LVS; 24	HOM; 11	MAR; 16	PHO; 24	27th	579	
2025	Wood Brothers Racing	21	Ford	DAY; 37	ATL; 25	COA; 26	PHO; 4	LVS; 1	HOM; 17	MAR; 32	DAR; 36	BRI; 12	TAL; 26	TEX; 32	KAN; 6	CLT; 12	NSH; 30	MCH; 12	MXC; 26	POC; 12	ATL; 32	CSC; 34	SON; 13	DOV; 28	IND; 22	IOW; 13	GLN; 35	RCH; 8	DAY; 9	DAR; 38	GTW; 36	BRI; 39	NHA; 2	KAN; 33	ROV; 16	LVS; 26	TAL; 33	MAR; 10	PHO; 7	16th	2150	
2026	Wood Brothers Racing	21	Ford	DAY; 9	ATL; 38	COA; 26	PHO; 32	LVS; 31	DAR; 17	MAR; 10	BRI; 32	KAN; 27	TAL; 33	TEX; 29	GLN; 32	CLT; 29	NSH; 31	MCH; 15	POC; 33	COR; 29	SON; 28	CHI; 33	ATL; 25	NWS; 36	IND; 7	IOW; 4	RCH; 8	NHA; 3	DAY; 9	DAR; 7	GTW; 28	BRI; 6	KAN; 35	LVS; 26	CLT; 4	PHO; 11	TAL; 12	MAR; 4	HOM; 13	22nd	651	

===== Daytona 500 =====
Year	Team	Manufacturer	Start	Finish
2024	Stewart–Haas Racing	Ford	30	25
2025	Wood Brothers Racing	Ford	29	37
2026	Wood Brothers Racing	Ford	14	9

==== Xfinity Series ====
NASCAR Xfinity Series results
Year	Team	No.	Make	1	2	3	4	5	6	7	8	9	10	11	12	13	14	15	16	17	18	19	20	21	22	23	24	25	26	27	28	29	30	31	32	33	NXSC	Pts	Ref
2014	JR Motorsports	5	Chevy	DAY	PHO	LVS	BRI	CAL	TEX	DAR	RCH	TAL	IOW	CLT	DOV	MCH	ROA	KEN	DAY	NHA	CHI	IND	IOW; 12	GLN	MOH	BRI	ATL	RCH	CHI	KEN	DOV	KAN	CLT	TEX	PHO	HOM; 25	50th	51	
2015	JR Motorsports	88	Chevy	DAY	ATL	LVS	PHO	CAL	TEX	BRI	RCH	TAL	IOW	CLT	DOV	MCH	CHI	DAY	KEN	NHA	IND	IOW	GLN	MOH	BRI	ROA	DAR	RCH; 7	CHI	KEN	DOV	CLT	KAN	TEX	PHO	HOM	60th	37	
2016	JR Motorsports	88	Chevy	DAY	ATL	LVS	PHO	CAL	TEX	BRI	RCH	TAL	DOV	CLT	POC	MCH	IOW	DAY	KEN	NHA	IND	IOW; 9	GLN	MOH	BRI	ROA				KEN; 13	DOV	CLT	KAN	TEX	PHO	HOM	41st	74	
2016	Obaika Racing	97	Chevy																								DAR; 27	RCH	CHI								41st	74	
2017	NextGen Motorsports	55	Toyota	DAY	ATL	LVS	PHO	CAL	TEX	BRI	RCH	TAL	CLT	DOV	POC	MCH	IOW	DAY	KEN	NHA	IND	IOW	GLN	MOH	BRI	ROA	DAR	RCH	CHI	KEN	DOV	CLT	KAN; 34	TEX	PHO	HOM	80th	3	
2021	JR Motorsports	8	Chevy	DAY; 27	DRC	HOM; 10	LVS; 7	PHO; 36	ATL; 38	MAR; 1*	TAL; 31	DAR; 2	DOV; 2	COA	CLT; 32		TEX; 19	NSH; 4																			17th	540	
2021	Jordan Anderson Racing	31	Chevy													MOH; 8			POC; 9	ROA	ATL; 23							RCH; 24							MAR; 28	PHO	17th	540	
2021	JR Motorsports	1	Chevy																			NHA; 8	GLN	IRC	MCH; 4	DAY	DAR		BRI; 35	LVS; 1	TAL; 9	ROV	TEX	KAN			17th	540	
2022	JR Motorsports	8	Chevy	DAY; 16	CAL; 4	LVS; 4	PHO; 3	ATL; 33	COA; 27	RCH; 7	MAR; 19	TAL; 11	DOV; 1	DAR; 18	TEX; 7*	CLT; 1*	PIR; 4	NSH; 29	ROA; 3	ATL; 2	**NHA**; 31	POC; 3	IRC; 14	MCH; 6	GLN; 9	DAY; 18	DAR; 8	KAN; 7	BRI; 7	TEX; 6	TAL; 5	ROV; 8	LVS; 1	HOM; 11	MAR; 20	PHO; 13	4th	4024	
2023	JR Motorsports	8	Chevy	DAY; 26	CAL; 5	LVS; 5	PHO; 8	ATL; 7	COA; 8	RCH; 3	MAR; 4	TAL; 30	DOV; 2	DAR; 7	CLT; 15	PIR; 4	SON; 33	NSH; 5	CSC; 24	ATL; 19	NHA; 17	**POC**; 24*	ROA; 6	**MCH**; 2	IRC; 14	GLN; 20	DAY; 17	DAR; 5	KAN; 6	BRI; 36	TEX; 27	ROV; 3	**LVS**; 12	HOM; 32	MAR; 5	PHO; 6	11th	2172	
2024	AM Racing	15	Ford	DAY	ATL	LVS	PHO	COA	RCH	MAR	TEX	TAL	DOV	DAR	CLT	PIR	SON	IOW	NHA	NSH	CSC	POC; 27	IND; 38	MCH	DAY	DAR	ATL	GLN	BRI	KAN	TAL	ROV	LVS	HOM	MAR	PHO	104th	0^{1}	

==== Camping World Truck Series ====
NASCAR Camping World Truck Series results
Year	Team	No.	Make	1	2	3	4	5	6	7	8	9	10	11	12	13	14	15	16	17	18	19	20	21	22	23	NCWTC	Pts	Ref
2016	Contreras Motorsports	71	Chevy	DAY	ATL	MAR	KAN	DOV	CLT	TEX	IOW	GTW	KEN	ELD	POC	BRI	MCH	MSP	CHI; 13	NHA	LVS	TAL	MAR	TEX	PHO	HOM	92nd	0^{1}	
2021	Young's Motorsports	02	Chevy	DAY	DRC	LVS	ATL; 22	BRD	RCH	KAN	DAR	COA	CLT														102nd	0^{1}	
2021	Rackley W.A.R.	25	Chevy											TEX; 10	NSH; 19	POC; 11	KNX; 28	GLN; 11	GTW; 15	DAR; 17	BRI; 11	LVS	TAL	MAR; 28	PHO		102nd	0^{1}	

^{*} Season still in progress
^{1} Ineligible for series points

=== ARCA Menards Series ===
(key) (Bold – Pole position awarded by qualifying time. Italics – Pole position earned by points standings or practice time. * – Most laps led.)

ARCA Menards Series results
Year	Team	No.	Make	1	2	3	4	5	6	7	8	9	10	11	12	13	14	15	16	17	18	19	20	AMSC	Pts	Ref
2018	Chad Bryant Racing	22	Ford	DAY	NSH	SLM; 4	TAL	TOL	CLT	POC	MCH	MAD	GTW	CHI	IOW	ELK	POC	ISF	BLN	DSF	SLM	IRP	KAN	74th	215	
2022	McGowan Motorsports	17w	Chevy	DAY	PHO; 8	TAL	KAN	CLT	IOW	BLN	ELK	MOH	POC	IRP	MCH	GLN	ISF	MLW	DSF	KAN	BRI	SLM	TOL	80th	36	

==== ARCA Menards Series East ====
ARCA Menards Series East results
Year	Team	No.	Make	1	2	3	4	5	6	7	8	9	10	11	12	13	14	15	16	AMSEC	Pts	Ref
2014	Darin Odle	45	Ford	NSM	DAY	BRI	GRE; 24	RCH; 17	IOW	BGS	FIF	LGY	NHA	COL	IOW	GLN	VIR	GRE	DOV	47th	47	
2019	Visconti Motorsports	74	Chevy	NSM	BRI	SBO	SBO	MEM	NHA	IOW	GLN	BRI	GTW	NHA; 3	DOV					31st	41	
2021	Cook-Finley Racing	41	Chevy	NSM	FIF	NSV	DOV; 2	SNM	IOW	MLW	BRI									33rd	42	

==== ARCA Menards Series West ====
ARCA Menards Series West results
Year	Team	No.	Make	1	2	3	4	5	6	7	8	9	10	11	AMSWC	Pts	Ref
2022	McGowan Motorsports	17w	Chevy	PHO; 8	IRW	KCR	PIR	SON	IRW	EVG	PIR	AAS	LVS	PHO	53rd	36	

=== CARS Late Model Stock Car Tour ===
(key) (Bold – Pole position awarded by qualifying time. Italics – Pole position earned by points standings or practice time. * – Most laps led. ** – All laps led.)

CARS Late Model Stock Car Tour results
Year	Team	No.	Make	1	2	3	4	5	6	7	8	9	10	11	12	13	14	15	16	17	CLMSCTC	Pts	Ref
2015	JR Motorsports	88B	Chevy	SNM	ROU	HCY	SNM	TCM	MMS; 1	**ROU**; 1*	CON	MYB; 9	HCY; 1								18th	128	
2016	JR Motorsports	88B	Chevy	SNM; 3	ROU; 3	HCY; 1	TCM; 1	GRE; 4	ROU	**CON**; 1*	MYB; 1*	HCY; 2*	SNM; 1								3rd	296	
2017	JR Motorsports	88B	Chevy	**CON**; 1*	DOM; 10	DOM; 16	**HCY**; 21*	**HCY**; 2	BRI; 12	AND; 1*	**ROU**; 3	TCM; 1	**ROU**; 3		CON; 1*	SBO; 10					1st	351	
2017	JR Motorsports	38	Chevy											HCY; 16							1st	351	
2018	JR Motorsports	88	Chevy	**TCM**; 5	MYB; 4	ROU	HCY; 2	BRI; 5	ACE; 14	CCS; 9	KPT; 9		WKS; 5	ROU; 1	SBO; 4						4th	312	
2018	JR Motorsports	73	Chevy									**HCY**; 1*									4th	312	
2019	JR Motorsports	88	Chevy	SNM; 2*	HCY; 4	ROU; 4	ACE; 1	**MMS**; 14*	LGY; 9	DOM; 1	CCS; 1		ROU; 19	**SBO**; 1**							2nd	324	
2019	JR Motorsports	31B	Chevy									**HCY**; 6									2nd	324	
2020	JR Motorsports	88	Chevy	SNM; 4	ACE; DSQ	HCY	HCY	DOM	FCS	LGY	CCS	FLO									22nd	65	
2020	JR Motorsports	8	Chevy										**GRE**; 1*								22nd	65	
2021	JR Motorsports	8	Chevy	DIL	HCY	OCS; 1*	ACE				**HCY**; 1	MMS; 6	TCM	FLC	WKS	SBO					19th	108	
2021	JR Motorsports	88	Chevy					CRW; 22	LGY	DOM											19th	108	
2022	JR Motorsports	88	Chevy	CRW	HCY	GRE; 1	AAS	FCS	LGY	DOM	HCY	ACE	MMS	NWS	TCM						30th	66	
2022	JR Motorsports	8	Chevy													ACE; 2	SBO	CRW			30th	66	
2024	Kevin Harvick Incorporated	62	Ford	SNM	HCY	AAS	OCS	ACE	TCM	LGY	DOM	CRW	HCY; 9	NWS	ACE	WCS	FLC	SBO	TCM	NWS	N/A	0	

=== CARS Super Late Model Tour ===
(key)

CARS Super Late Model Tour results
Year	Team	No.	Make	1	2	3	4	5	6	7	8	9	10	CSLMTC	Pts	Ref
2015	Lee Faulk Racing	5	N/A	SNM	ROU	HCY	SNM	TCM	MMS	ROU	CON	MYB	HCY; 3	42nd	30	
2016	Hampke Racing	74	N/A	SNM	ROU	HCY	TCM	GRE	ROU	CON	MYB	HCY; 9	SNM	44th	24	
2019	DLP Motorsports	97	Chevy	SNM	HCY; 10	NSH	MMS	BRI	HCY	ROU	SBO			32nd	24	
2021	Wade Lopez	96	Chevy	HCY	GPS	NSH	**JEN**; 7	HCY	MMS	TCM	SBO			22nd	28	

=== CARS Pro Late Model Tour ===
(key)

CARS Pro Late Model Tour results
Year	Team	No.	Make	1	2	3	4	5	6	7	8	9	10	11	12	13	CPLMTC	Pts	Ref
2025	Fathead Racing	21	Ford	AAS	CDL	OCS	ACE	NWS; 5	CRW	HCY	HCY	AND	FLC	SBO	TCM	NWS	49th	37	

=== ASA STARS National Tour ===
(key) (Bold – Pole position awarded by qualifying time. Italics – Pole position earned by points standings or practice time. * – Most laps led. ** – All laps led.)

ASA STARS National Tour results
Year	Team	No.	Make	1	2	3	4	5	6	7	8	9	10	ASNTC	Pts	Ref
2024	Kevin Harvick Inc.	4	Ford	NSM	FIF	HCY; 5	MAD	MLW	AND	OWO	TOL	WIN	NSV	39th	66	
