= 2021 Drydene 400 =

NASCAR Cup Series race

Race details
- Race 13 of 36 in the 2021 NASCAR Cup Series
- Date: May 16, 2021
- Location: Dover International Speedway in Dover, Delaware
- Course: Permanent racing facility
- Course length: 1 miles (1.6 km)
- Distance: 400 laps, 400 mi (640 km)
- Average speed: 120.05 miles per hour (193.20 km/h)

Pole position
Driver	Martin Truex Jr.	Joe Gibbs Racing
- Grid positions set by competition-based formula

Most laps led
Driver	Kyle Larson	Hendrick Motorsports
- Laps: 263

Winner
No. 48	Alex Bowman	Hendrick Motorsports

Television in the United States
- Network: FS1
- Announcers: Mike Joy, Jeff Gordon and Clint Bowyer

Radio in the United States
- Radio: MRN
- Booth announcers: Alex Hayden and Jeff Striegle
- Turn announcers: Mike Bagley (Backstretch)

2021 Drydene 400 program cover. From left to right: Kevin Harvick, Denny Hamlin, Chase Elliot, Kyle Busch, and Martin Truex Jr..

The 2021 Drydene 400 was a NASCAR Cup Series race that was held on May 16, 2021, at Dover International Speedway in Dover, Delaware. Contested over 400 laps on the 1-mile (1.6 km) concrete speedway, it was the 13th race of the 2021 NASCAR Cup Series season.

All of Hendrick Motorsports's cars finished in the top four with Alex Bowman taking the checkered flag, the first team to do so since Roush Racing at the 2005 Ford 400. (Note: Joe Gibbs Racing had repeated the same feat at 2019 Federated Auto Parts 400, but Erik Jones, finishing fourth that race, was later disqualified.)

== Entry list ==
- (R) denotes rookie driver.
- (i) denotes driver who are ineligible for series driver points.

No.	Driver	Team	Manufacturer
00	Quin Houff	StarCom Racing	Chevrolet
1	Kurt Busch	Chip Ganassi Racing	Chevrolet
2	Brad Keselowski	Team Penske	Ford
3	Austin Dillon	Richard Childress Racing	Chevrolet
4	Kevin Harvick	Stewart-Haas Racing	Ford
5	Kyle Larson	Hendrick Motorsports	Chevrolet
6	Ryan Newman	Roush Fenway Racing	Ford
7	Corey LaJoie	Spire Motorsports	Chevrolet
8	Tyler Reddick	Richard Childress Racing	Chevrolet
9	Chase Elliott	Hendrick Motorsports	Chevrolet
10	Aric Almirola	Stewart-Haas Racing	Ford
11	Denny Hamlin	Joe Gibbs Racing	Toyota
12	Ryan Blaney	Team Penske	Ford
14	Chase Briscoe (R)	Stewart-Haas Racing	Ford
15	James Davison	Rick Ware Racing	Chevrolet
17	Chris Buescher	Roush Fenway Racing	Ford
18	Kyle Busch	Joe Gibbs Racing	Toyota
19	Martin Truex Jr.	Joe Gibbs Racing	Toyota
20	Christopher Bell	Joe Gibbs Racing	Toyota
21	Matt DiBenedetto	Wood Brothers Racing	Ford
22	Joey Logano	Team Penske	Ford
23	Bubba Wallace	23XI Racing	Toyota
24	William Byron	Hendrick Motorsports	Chevrolet
34	Michael McDowell	Front Row Motorsports	Ford
37	Ryan Preece	JTG Daugherty Racing	Chevrolet
38	Anthony Alfredo (R)	Front Row Motorsports	Ford
41	Cole Custer	Stewart-Haas Racing	Ford
42	Ross Chastain	Chip Ganassi Racing	Chevrolet
43	Erik Jones	Richard Petty Motorsports	Chevrolet
47	Ricky Stenhouse Jr.	JTG Daugherty Racing	Chevrolet
48	Alex Bowman	Hendrick Motorsports	Chevrolet
51	Cody Ware (i)	Petty Ware Racing	Chevrolet
52	Josh Bilicki	Rick Ware Racing	Ford
53	Garrett Smithley (i)	Rick Ware Racing	Chevrolet
77	Josh Berry (i)	Spire Motorsports	Chevrolet
78	B. J. McLeod (i)	Live Fast Motorsports	Ford
99	Daniel Suárez	Trackhouse Racing Team	Chevrolet
Official entry list

== Qualifying ==
Martin Truex Jr. was awarded the pole for the race as determined by competition-based formula.

=== Starting Lineup ===
Pos	No.	Driver	Team	Manufacturer
1	19	Martin Truex Jr.	Joe Gibbs Racing	Toyota
2	11	Denny Hamlin	Joe Gibbs Racing	Toyota
3	24	William Byron	Hendrick Motorsports	Chevrolet
4	5	Kyle Larson	Hendrick Motorsports	Chevrolet
5	4	Kevin Harvick	Stewart-Haas Racing	Ford
6	18	Kyle Busch	Joe Gibbs Racing	Toyota
7	12	Ryan Blaney	Team Penske	Ford
8	9	Chase Elliott	Hendrick Motorsports	Chevrolet
9	22	Joey Logano	Team Penske	Ford
10	17	Chris Buescher	Roush Fenway Racing	Ford
11	20	Christopher Bell	Joe Gibbs Racing	Toyota
12	8	Tyler Reddick	Richard Childress Racing	Chevrolet
13	6	Ryan Newman	Roush Fenway Racing	Ford
14	3	Austin Dillon	Richard Childress Racing	Chevrolet
15	2	Brad Keselowski	Team Penske	Ford
16	48	Alex Bowman	Hendrick Motorsports	Chevrolet
17	14	Chase Briscoe (R)	Stewart-Haas Racing	Ford
18	21	Matt DiBenedetto	Wood Brothers Racing	Ford
19	42	Ross Chastain	Chip Ganassi Racing	Chevrolet
20	47	Ricky Stenhouse Jr.	JTG Daugherty Racing	Chevrolet
21	34	Michael McDowell	Front Row Motorsports	Ford
22	23	Bubba Wallace	23XI Racing	Toyota
23	43	Erik Jones	Richard Petty Motorsports	Chevrolet
24	99	Daniel Suárez	Trackhouse Racing Team	Chevrolet
25	37	Ryan Preece	JTG Daugherty Racing	Chevrolet
26	7	Corey LaJoie	Spire Motorsports	Chevrolet
27	38	Anthony Alfredo (R)	Front Row Motorsports	Ford
28	1	Kurt Busch	Chip Ganassi Racing	Chevrolet
29	77	Josh Berry (i)	Spire Motorsports	Chevrolet
30	41	Cole Custer	Stewart-Haas Racing	Ford
31	78	B. J. McLeod (i)	Live Fast Motorsports	Ford
32	10	Aric Almirola	Stewart-Haas Racing	Ford
33	15	James Davison	Rick Ware Racing	Chevrolet
34	51	Cody Ware (i)	Petty Ware Racing	Chevrolet
35	00	Quin Houff	StarCom Racing	Chevrolet
36	53	Garrett Smithley (i)	Rick Ware Racing	Chevrolet
37	52	Josh Bilicki	Rick Ware Racing	Ford
Official starting lineup

== Race ==
=== Stage Results ===
Stage One Laps: 120

Pos	No	Driver	Team	Manufacturer	Points
1	5	Kyle Larson	Hendrick Motorsports	Chevrolet	10
2	11	Denny Hamlin	Joe Gibbs Racing	Toyota	9
3	12	Ryan Blaney	Team Penske	Ford	8
4	9	Chase Elliott	Hendrick Motorsports	Chevrolet	7
5	4	Kevin Harvick	Stewart-Haas Racing	Ford	6
6	24	William Byron	Hendrick Motorsports	Chevrolet	5
7	22	Joey Logano	Team Penske	Ford	4
8	48	Alex Bowman	Hendrick Motorsports	Chevrolet	3
9	17	Chris Buescher	Roush Fenway Racing	Ford	2
10	2	Brad Keselowski	Team Penske	Ford	1
Official stage one results

Stage Two Laps: 120

Pos	No	Driver	Team	Manufacturer	Points
1	5	Kyle Larson	Hendrick Motorsports	Chevrolet	10
2	9	Chase Elliott	Hendrick Motorsports	Chevrolet	9
3	48	Alex Bowman	Hendrick Motorsports	Chevrolet	8
4	24	William Byron	Hendrick Motorsports	Chevrolet	7
5	11	Denny Hamlin	Joe Gibbs Racing	Toyota	6
6	4	Kevin Harvick	Stewart-Haas Racing	Ford	5
7	1	Kurt Busch	Chip Ganassi Racing	Chevrolet	4
8	2	Brad Keselowski	Team Penske	Ford	3
9	3	Austin Dillon	Richard Childress Racing	Chevrolet	2
10	8	Tyler Reddick	Richard Childress Racing	Chevrolet	1
Official stage two results

=== Final Stage Results ===
Stage Three Laps: 160

Pos	Grid	No	Driver	Team	Manufacturer	Laps	Points
1	16	48	Alex Bowman	Hendrick Motorsports	Chevrolet	400	51
2	4	5	Kyle Larson	Hendrick Motorsports	Chevrolet	400	55
3	8	9	Chase Elliott	Hendrick Motorsports	Chevrolet	400	50
4	3	24	William Byron	Hendrick Motorsports	Chevrolet	400	45
5	9	22	Joey Logano	Team Penske	Ford	400	36
6	5	4	Kevin Harvick	Stewart-Haas Racing	Ford	400	42
7	2	11	Denny Hamlin	Joe Gibbs Racing	Toyota	400	45
8	12	8	Tyler Reddick	Richard Childress Racing	Chevrolet	400	30
9	24	99	Daniel Suárez	Trackhouse Racing Team	Chevrolet	400	28
10	30	41	Cole Custer	Stewart-Haas Racing	Ford	400	27
11	22	23	Bubba Wallace	23XI Racing	Toyota	400	26
12	7	12	Ryan Blaney	Team Penske	Ford	400	33
13	28	1	Kurt Busch	Chip Ganassi Racing	Chevrolet	400	28
14	14	3	Austin Dillon	Richard Childress Racing	Chevrolet	400	25
15	19	42	Ross Chastain	Chip Ganassi Racing	Chevrolet	400	22
16	15	2	Brad Keselowski	Team Penske	Ford	400	25
17	10	17	Chris Buescher	Roush Fenway Racing	Ford	400	22
18	25	37	Ryan Preece	JTG Daugherty Racing	Chevrolet	399	19
19	1	19	Martin Truex Jr.	Joe Gibbs Racing	Toyota	399	18
20	20	47	Ricky Stenhouse Jr.	JTG Daugherty Racing	Chevrolet	399	17
21	11	20	Christopher Bell	Joe Gibbs Racing	Toyota	396	16
22	23	43	Erik Jones	Richard Petty Motorsports	Chevrolet	396	15
23	13	6	Ryan Newman	Roush Fenway Racing	Ford	396	14
24	18	21	Matt DiBenedetto	Wood Brothers Racing	Ford	395	13
25	21	34	Michael McDowell	Front Row Motorsports	Ford	395	12
26	26	7	Corey LaJoie	Spire Motorsports	Chevrolet	393	11
27	6	18	Kyle Busch	Joe Gibbs Racing	Toyota	393	10
28	27	38	Anthony Alfredo (R)	Front Row Motorsports	Ford	392	9
29	35	00	Quin Houff	StarCom Racing	Chevrolet	388	8
30	29	77	Josh Berry (i)	Spire Motorsports	Chevrolet	388	0
31	34	51	Cody Ware (i)	Petty Ware Racing	Chevrolet	387	0
32	36	53	Garrett Smithley (i)	Rick Ware Racing	Chevrolet	383	0
33	33	15	James Davison	Rick Ware Racing	Chevrolet	382	4
34	37	52	Josh Bilicki	Rick Ware Racing	Ford	381	3
35	17	14	Chase Briscoe (R)	Stewart-Haas Racing	Ford	335	2
36	31	78	B. J. McLeod (i)	Live Fast Motorsports	Ford	334	0
37	32	10	Aric Almirola	Stewart-Haas Racing	Ford	300	1
Official race results

=== Race statistics ===
- Lead changes: 10 among 5 different drivers
- Cautions/Laps: 7 for 41
- Red flags: 0
- Time of race: 3 hours, 19 minutes and 55 seconds
- Average speed: 120.05 miles per hour (193.20 km/h)

== Media ==
=== Television ===
Fox Sports covered the race on the television side. Mike Joy, five-time Dover winner Jeff Gordon and Clint Bowyer called the race from the broadcast booth. Jamie Little and Regan Smith handled pit road for the television side. Larry McReynolds provided insight from the Fox Sports studio in Charlotte.

FS1
Booth announcers	Pit reporters	In-race analyst
Lap-by-lap: Mike Joy; Color-commentator: Jeff Gordon; Color-commentator: Clint Bowyer	Jamie Little; Regan Smith	Larry McReynolds

=== Radio ===
MRN had the radio call for the race and was also simulcasted on Sirius XM NASCAR Radio.

MRN Radio
Booth announcers	Turn announcers	Pit reporters
Lead announcer: Alex Hayden; Announcer: Jeff Striegle	Backstretch: Mike Bagley	Kim Coon; Steve Post

== Standings after the race ==
Drivers' Championship standings

	Pos	Driver	Points
	1	Denny Hamlin	574
1	2	William Byron	473 (–101)
1	3	Martin Truex Jr.	472 (–102)
	4	Joey Logano	442 (–132)
1	5	Kyle Larson	440 (–134)
1	6	Ryan Blaney	438 (–136)
1	7	Chase Elliott	432 (–142)
1	8	Kevin Harvick	427 (–147)
	9	Brad Keselowski	404 (–170)
	10	Kyle Busch	383 (–191)
1	11	Austin Dillon	341 (–233)
1	12	Christopher Bell	336 (–238)
1	13	Alex Bowman	332 (–242)
1	14	Chris Buescher	309 (–265)
1	15	Tyler Reddick	298 (–276)
1	16	Michael McDowell	290 (–284)
Official driver's standings

Manufacturers' Championship standings

	Pos	Manufacturer	Points
1	1	Chevrolet	467
1	2	Ford	460 (–7)
	3	Toyota	452 (–15)

- Note: Only the first 16 positions are included for the driver standings.
- . – Driver has clinched a position in the NASCAR Cup Series playoffs.

== Notes ==
Previous race: 2021 Goodyear 400	NASCAR Cup Series; 2021 season	Next race: 2021 Texas Grand Prix
