= 2025 Straight Talk Wireless 400 =

Race details
- Race 6 of 36 in the 2025 NASCAR Cup Series
- 2025 Straight Talk Wireless 400 official program
- Date: March 23, 2025
- Location: Homestead-Miami Speedway in Homestead, Florida
- Course: Permanent racing facility
- Course length: 1.5 miles (2.4 km)
- Distance: 267 laps, 400.5 mi (640.8 km)
- Average speed: 131.876 miles per hour (212.234 km/h)

Pole position
Driver	Alex Bowman	Hendrick Motorsports
- Time: 31.982

Most laps led
Driver	Ryan Blaney	Team Penske
- Laps: 124

Fastest lap
Driver	Bubba Wallace	23XI Racing
- Time: 32.335

Winner
No. 5	Kyle Larson	Hendrick Motorsports

Television in the United States
- Network: FS1
- Announcers: Mike Joy, Clint Bowyer, and Kevin Harvick
- Nielsen ratings: 2.464 million

Radio in the United States
- Radio: MRN
- Booth announcers: Alex Hayden, Mike Bagley and Todd Gordon
- Turn announcers: Dave Moody (1 & 2) and Tim Catafalmo (3 & 4)

The 2025 Straight Talk Wireless 400 was a NASCAR Cup Series race held on March 23, 2025, at Homestead-Miami Speedway in Homestead, Florida. Contested over 267 laps on the 1.5 mile (2.4 km) oval, it was the 6th race of the 2025 NASCAR Cup Series season.

Kyle Larson won the race. Alex Bowman finished 2nd, and Bubba Wallace finished 3rd. Chase Briscoe and Denny Hamlin rounded out the top five, and Chris Buescher, A. J. Allmendinger, Tyler Reddick, Ryan Preece, and Justin Haley rounded out the top ten.

== Report ==
=== Background ===
Homestead-Miami Speedway, the track where the race was held.

Homestead-Miami Speedway is a motor racing track located in Homestead, Florida. The track, which has several configurations, has promoted several series of racing, including NASCAR, the NTT IndyCar Series and the Grand-Am Rolex Sports Car Series

From 2002 to 2019, Homestead-Miami Speedway has hosted the final race of the season in all three of NASCAR's series: the NASCAR Cup Series, Xfinity Series and Craftsman Truck Series.

==== Entry list ====
- (R) denotes rookie driver.
- (i) denotes driver who is ineligible for series driver points.

No.	Driver	Team	Manufacturer
1	Ross Chastain	Trackhouse Racing	Chevrolet
2	Austin Cindric	Team Penske	Ford
3	Austin Dillon	Richard Childress Racing	Chevrolet
4	Noah Gragson	Front Row Motorsports	Ford
5	Kyle Larson	Hendrick Motorsports	Chevrolet
6	Brad Keselowski	RFK Racing	Ford
7	Justin Haley	Spire Motorsports	Chevrolet
8	Kyle Busch	Richard Childress Racing	Chevrolet
9	Chase Elliott	Hendrick Motorsports	Chevrolet
10	Ty Dillon	Kaulig Racing	Chevrolet
11	Denny Hamlin	Joe Gibbs Racing	Toyota
12	Ryan Blaney	Team Penske	Ford
16	A. J. Allmendinger	Kaulig Racing	Chevrolet
17	Chris Buescher	RFK Racing	Ford
19	Chase Briscoe	Joe Gibbs Racing	Toyota
20	Christopher Bell	Joe Gibbs Racing	Toyota
21	Josh Berry	Wood Brothers Racing	Ford
22	Joey Logano	Team Penske	Ford
23	Bubba Wallace	23XI Racing	Toyota
24	William Byron	Hendrick Motorsports	Chevrolet
34	Todd Gilliland	Front Row Motorsports	Ford
35	Riley Herbst (R)	23XI Racing	Toyota
38	Zane Smith	Front Row Motorsports	Ford
41	Cole Custer	Haas Factory Team	Ford
42	John Hunter Nemechek	Legacy Motor Club	Toyota
43	Erik Jones	Legacy Motor Club	Toyota
44	J. J. Yeley	NY Racing Team	Chevrolet
45	Tyler Reddick	23XI Racing	Toyota
47	Ricky Stenhouse Jr.	Hyak Motorsports	Chevrolet
48	Alex Bowman	Hendrick Motorsports	Chevrolet
51	Cody Ware	Rick Ware Racing	Ford
54	Ty Gibbs	Joe Gibbs Racing	Toyota
60	Ryan Preece	RFK Racing	Ford
71	Michael McDowell	Spire Motorsports	Chevrolet
77	Carson Hocevar	Spire Motorsports	Chevrolet
88	Shane van Gisbergen (R)	Trackhouse Racing	Chevrolet
99	Daniel Suárez	Trackhouse Racing	Chevrolet
Official entry list

== Practice ==
Bubba Wallace was the fastest in the practice session with a time of 32.344 seconds and a speed of 166.955 mph (268.688 km/h).

=== Practice results ===
Pos	No.	Driver	Team	Manufacturer	Time	Speed
1	23	Bubba Wallace	23XI Racing	Toyota	32.344	166.955
2	43	Erik Jones	Legacy Motor Club	Toyota	32.369	166.826
3	5	Kyle Larson	Hendrick Motorsports	Chevrolet	32.391	166.713
Official practice results

== Qualifying ==
Alex Bowman scored the pole for the race with a time of 31.982 and a speed of 168.845 mph (271.730 km/h).

=== Qualifying results ===
Pos	No.	Driver	Team	Manufacturer	Time	Speed
1	48	Alex Bowman	Hendrick Motorsports	Chevrolet	31.982	168.845
2	21	Josh Berry	Wood Brothers Racing	Ford	32.055	168.460
3	4	Noah Gragson	Front Row Motorsports	Ford	32.101	168.219
4	19	Chase Briscoe	Joe Gibbs Racing	Toyota	32.116	168.140
5	24	William Byron	Hendrick Motorsports	Chevrolet	32.134	168.046
6	12	Ryan Blaney	Team Penske	Ford	32.141	168.010
7	42	John Hunter Nemechek	Legacy Motor Club	Toyota	32.171	167.853
8	2	Austin Cindric	Team Penske	Ford	32.193	167.738
9	23	Bubba Wallace	23XI Racing	Toyota	32.211	167.645
10	16	A. J. Allmendinger	Kaulig Racing	Chevrolet	32.214	167.629
11	17	Chris Buescher	RFK Racing	Ford	32.278	167.297
12	22	Joey Logano	Team Penske	Ford	32.288	167.245
13	54	Ty Gibbs	Joe Gibbs Racing	Toyota	32.297	167.198
14	5	Kyle Larson	Hendrick Motorsports	Chevrolet	32.302	167.172
15	77	Carson Hocevar	Spire Motorsports	Chevrolet	32.307	167.146
16	20	Christopher Bell	Joe Gibbs Racing	Toyota	32.309	167.136
17	38	Zane Smith	Front Row Motorsports	Ford	32.317	167.095
18	9	Chase Elliott	Hendrick Motorsports	Chevrolet	32.331	167.022
19	35	Riley Herbst (R)	23XI Racing	Toyota	32.334	167.007
20	45	Tyler Reddick	23XI Racing	Toyota	32.350	166.924
21	7	Justin Haley	Spire Motorsports	Chevrolet	32.350	166.924
22	8	Kyle Busch	Richard Childress Racing	Chevrolet	32.369	166.826
23	11	Denny Hamlin	Joe Gibbs Racing	Toyota	32.379	166.775
24	41	Cole Custer	Haas Factory Team	Ford	32.382	166.759
25	1	Ross Chastain	Trackhouse Racing	Chevrolet	32.391	166.713
26	71	Michael McDowell	Spire Motorsports	Chevrolet	32.395	166.692
27	47	Ricky Stenhouse Jr.	Hyak Motorsports	Chevrolet	32.395	166.692
28	43	Erik Jones	Legacy Motor Club	Toyota	32.396	166.687
29	34	Todd Gilliland	Front Row Motorsports	Ford	32.445	166.436
30	3	Austin Dillon	Richard Childress Racing	Chevrolet	32.453	166.394
31	60	Ryan Preece	RFK Racing	Ford	32.460	166.359
32	6	Brad Keselowski	RFK Racing	Ford	32.511	166.098
33	99	Daniel Suárez	Trackhouse Racing	Chevrolet	32.513	166.087
34	10	Ty Dillon	Kaulig Racing	Chevrolet	32.518	166.062
35	88	Shane van Gisbergen (R)	Trackhouse Racing	Chevrolet	32.740	164.936
36	51	Cody Ware	Rick Ware Racing	Ford	33.184	162.729
37	44	J. J. Yeley	NY Racing Team	Chevrolet	34.121	158.260
Official qualifying results

== Race ==
=== Race results ===
==== Stage Results ====
Stage One Laps: 80

Pos	No	Driver	Team	Manufacturer	Points
1	12	Ryan Blaney	Team Penske	Ford	10
2	48	Alex Bowman	Hendrick Motorsports	Chevrolet	9
3	19	Chase Briscoe	Joe Gibbs Racing	Toyota	8
4	5	Kyle Larson	Hendrick Motorsports	Chevrolet	7
5	2	Austin Cindric	Team Penske	Ford	6
6	24	William Byron	Hendrick Motorsports	Chevrolet	5
7	16	A. J. Allmendinger	Kaulig Racing	Chevrolet	4
8	21	Josh Berry	Wood Brothers Racing	Ford	3
9	4	Noah Gragson	Front Row Motorsports	Ford	2
10	22	Joey Logano	Team Penske	Ford	1
Official stage one results

Stage Two Laps: 85

Pos	No	Driver	Team	Manufacturer	Points
1	11	Denny Hamlin	Joe Gibbs Racing	Toyota	10
2	5	Kyle Larson	Hendrick Motorsports	Chevrolet	9
3	12	Ryan Blaney	Team Penske	Ford	8
4	24	William Byron	Hendrick Motorsports	Chevrolet	7
5	23	Bubba Wallace	23XI Racing	Toyota	6
6	48	Alex Bowman	Hendrick Motorsports	Chevrolet	5
7	2	Austin Cindric	Team Penske	Ford	4
8	9	Chase Elliott	Hendrick Motorsports	Chevrolet	3
9	77	Carson Hocevar	Spire Motorsports	Chevrolet	2
10	45	Tyler Reddick	23XI Racing	Toyota	1
Official stage two results

=== Final Stage Results ===
Stage Three Laps: 102

Pos	Grid	No	Driver	Team	Manufacturer	Laps	Points
1	14	5	Kyle Larson	Hendrick Motorsports	Chevrolet	267	56
2	1	48	Alex Bowman	Hendrick Motorsports	Chevrolet	267	49
3	9	23	Bubba Wallace	23XI Racing	Toyota	267	41
4	4	19	Chase Briscoe	Joe Gibbs Racing	Toyota	267	41
5	23	11	Denny Hamlin	Joe Gibbs Racing	Toyota	267	42
6	11	17	Chris Buescher	RFK Racing	Ford	267	31
7	10	16	A. J. Allmendinger	Kaulig Racing	Chevrolet	267	34
8	20	45	Tyler Reddick	23XI Racing	Toyota	267	30
9	31	60	Ryan Preece	RFK Racing	Ford	267	28
10	21	7	Justin Haley	Spire Motorsports	Chevrolet	267	27
11	17	38	Zane Smith	Front Row Motorsports	Ford	267	26
12	5	24	William Byron	Hendrick Motorsports	Chevrolet	267	37
13	30	3	Austin Dillon	Richard Childress Racing	Chevrolet	267	24
14	12	22	Joey Logano	Team Penske	Ford	267	24
15	28	43	Erik Jones	Legacy Motor Club	Toyota	267	22
16	3	4	Noah Gragson	Front Row Motorsports	Ford	267	23
17	2	21	Josh Berry	Wood Brothers Racing	Ford	267	23
18	18	9	Chase Elliott	Hendrick Motorsports	Chevrolet	267	22
19	8	2	Austin Cindric	Team Penske	Ford	267	28
20	26	71	Michael McDowell	Spire Motorsports	Chevrolet	267	17
21	22	8	Kyle Busch	Richard Childress Racing	Chevrolet	267	16
22	33	99	Daniel Suárez	Trackhouse Racing	Chevrolet	267	15
23	7	42	John Hunter Nemechek	Legacy Motor Club	Toyota	267	14
24	27	47	Ricky Stenhouse Jr.	Hyak Motorsports	Chevrolet	267	13
25	13	54	Ty Gibbs	Joe Gibbs Racing	Toyota	267	12
26	32	6	Brad Keselowski	RFK Racing	Ford	266	11
27	34	10	Ty Dillon	Kaulig Racing	Chevrolet	266	10
28	24	41	Cole Custer	Haas Factory Team	Ford	266	9
29	16	20	Christopher Bell	Joe Gibbs Racing	Toyota	266	8
30	29	34	Todd Gilliland	Front Row Motorsports	Ford	266	7
31	25	1	Ross Chastain	Trackhouse Racing	Chevrolet	266	6
32	35	88	Shane van Gisbergen (R)	Trackhouse Racing	Chevrolet	266	5
33	19	35	Riley Herbst (R)	23XI Racing	Toyota	264	4
34	36	51	Cody Ware	Rick Ware Racing	Ford	264	3
35	37	44	J. J. Yeley	NY Racing Team	Chevrolet	262	2
36	6	12	Ryan Blaney	Team Penske	Ford	207	19
37	15	77	Carson Hocevar	Spire Motorsports	Chevrolet	185	3
Official race results

=== Race statistics ===
- Lead changes: 27 among 9 different drivers
- Cautions/Laps: 4 for 27
- Red flags: 0
- Time of race: 3 hours, 2 minutes and 13 seconds
- Average speed: 131.876 miles per hour (212.234 km/h)

== Media ==
=== Television ===
Fox Sports will cover the race. Mike Joy, Clint Bowyer and 2014 Homestead winner Kevin Harvick will call the race from the broadcast booth. Jamie Little and Regan Smith will handle pit road for the television side, and Larry McReynolds will provide insight on-site during the race. Portions of the race was broadcast on the Fox broadcast network while a circuit breaker repair was happening during the Thermal Club INDYCAR Grand Prix that caused a failure that lasted 30 minutes during the INDYCAR broadcast.

FS1
Booth announcers	Pit reporters	In-race analyst
Lap-by-lap: Mike Joy; Color-commentator: Clint Bowyer; Color-commentator: Kevin Harvick	Jamie Little; Regan Smith	Larry McReynolds

=== Radio ===
MRN will have the radio call for the race which will also be simulcasted on Sirius XM NASCAR Radio. Alex Hayden, Mike Bagley & former Championship Crew Chief Todd Gordon will call the action of the race for MRN when the field will race down the front straightaway. Dave Moody will cover the action for MRN in turns 1 & 2, and Tim Catafalmo will call of the action from turns 3 & 4. MRN Lead Pit Reporter Steve Post, Brienne Pedigo, and Chris Wilner will cover the action of the race for MRN on pit road.

MRN Radio
Booth announcers	Turn announcers	Pit reporters
Lead announcer: Alex Hayden; Announcer: Mike Bagley; Announcer: Todd Gordon	Turns 1 & 2: Dave Moody; Turns 3 & 4: Tim Catafalmo	Steve Post; Brienne Pedigo; Chris Wilner

== Standings after the race ==
Drivers' Championship standings

	Pos	Driver	Points
	1	William Byron	244
4	2	Kyle Larson	208 (–36)
2	3	Alex Bowman	205 (–39)
1	4	Tyler Reddick	189 (–55)
3	5	Christopher Bell	186 (–58)
2	6	Chase Elliott	181 (–63)
4	7	Bubba Wallace	166 (–78)
4	8	Denny Hamlin	164 (–80)
	9	Chris Buescher	164 (–80)
3	10	Ryan Blaney	162 (–82)
3	11	Joey Logano	160 (–84)
1	12	Josh Berry	142 (–102)
7	13	Chase Briscoe	135 (–109)
4	14	Ross Chastain	134 (–110)
1	15	Michael McDowell	134 (–110)
2	16	Ryan Preece	130 (–114)
Official driver's standings

Manufacturers' Championship standings

	Pos	Manufacturer	Points
1	1	Chevrolet	219
1	2	Toyota	214 (–5)
	3	Ford	197 (–22)

- Note: Only the first 16 positions are included for the driver standings.

Previous race: 2025 Pennzoil 400	NASCAR Cup Series; 2025 season	Next race: 2025 Cook Out 400 (Martinsville)
