= 2023 United Rentals Work United 500 =

Fourth race of the 2023 NASCAR Cup Series

Race details
- Race 4 of 36 in the 2023 NASCAR Cup Series
- Date: March 12, 2023
- Location: Phoenix Raceway in Avondale, Arizona
- Course: Permanent racing facility
- Course length: 1.022 miles (1.645 km)
- Distance: 317 laps, 323.974 mi (521.385 km)
- Scheduled distance: 312 laps, 318.864 mi (513.162 km)
- Average speed: 105.491 miles per hour (169.771 km/h)

Pole position
| Driver | Kyle Larson | Hendrick Motorsports |
- Time: 27.642

Most laps led
| Driver | Kyle Larson | Hendrick Motorsports |
- Laps: 201

Winner
| No. 24 | William Byron | Hendrick Motorsports |

Television in the United States
- Network: Fox
- Announcers: Mike Joy, Clint Bowyer, and Danica Patrick

Radio in the United States
- Radio: MRN
- Booth announcers: Alex Hayden, Jeff Striegle, and Todd Gordon
- Turn announcers: Dan Hubbard (1 & 2) and Kyle Rickey (3 & 4)

The 2023 United Rentals Work United 500 was a NASCAR Cup Series race held on March 12, 2023, at Phoenix Raceway in Avondale, Arizona. Contested over 317 laps – extended from 312 laps due to an overtime finish, on the one mile (1.6 km) oval, and it was the fourth race of the 2023 NASCAR Cup Series season.

== Report ==
=== Background ===
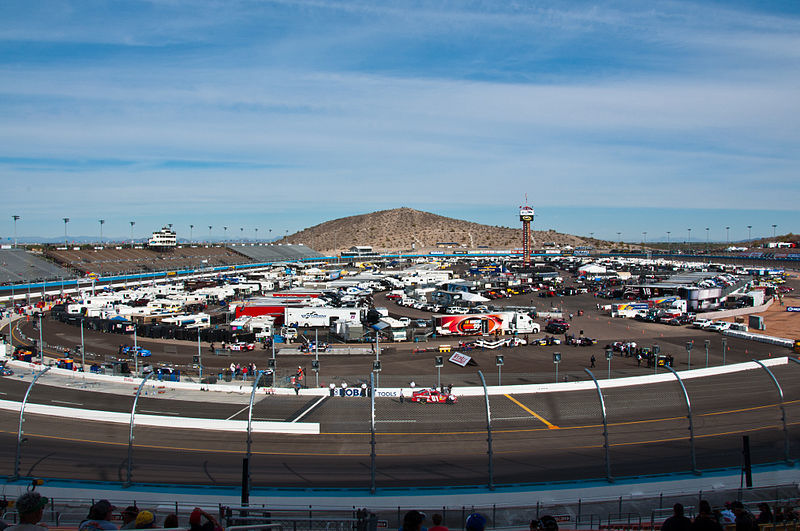
Phoenix Raceway, the track where the race was held.

Phoenix Raceway is a 1-mile, low-banked tri-oval race track located in Avondale, Arizona, near Phoenix. The motorsport track opened in 1964 and currently hosts two NASCAR race weekends annually including the final championship race since 2020. Phoenix Raceway has also hosted the CART, IndyCar Series, USAC and the WeatherTech SportsCar Championship. The raceway is currently owned and operated by NASCAR.

==== Entry list ====
- (R) denotes rookie driver.
- (i) denotes driver who is ineligible for series driver points.

| No. | Driver | Team | Manufacturer |
|---|---|---|---|
| 1 | Ross Chastain | Trackhouse Racing | Chevrolet |
| 2 | Austin Cindric | Team Penske | Ford |
| 3 | Austin Dillon | Richard Childress Racing | Chevrolet |
| 4 | Kevin Harvick | Stewart-Haas Racing | Ford |
| 5 | Kyle Larson | Hendrick Motorsports | Chevrolet |
| 6 | Brad Keselowski | RFK Racing | Ford |
| 7 | Corey LaJoie | Spire Motorsports | Chevrolet |
| 8 | Kyle Busch | Richard Childress Racing | Chevrolet |
| 9 | Josh Berry (i) | Hendrick Motorsports | Chevrolet |
| 10 | Aric Almirola | Stewart-Haas Racing | Ford |
| 11 | Denny Hamlin | Joe Gibbs Racing | Toyota |
| 12 | Ryan Blaney | Team Penske | Ford |
| 14 | Chase Briscoe | Stewart-Haas Racing | Ford |
| 15 | Todd Gilliland | Rick Ware Racing | Ford |
| 16 | A. J. Allmendinger | Kaulig Racing | Chevrolet |
| 17 | Chris Buescher | RFK Racing | Ford |
| 19 | Martin Truex Jr. | Joe Gibbs Racing | Toyota |
| 20 | Christopher Bell | Joe Gibbs Racing | Toyota |
| 21 | Harrison Burton | Wood Brothers Racing | Ford |
| 22 | Joey Logano | Team Penske | Ford |
| 23 | Bubba Wallace | 23XI Racing | Toyota |
| 24 | William Byron | Hendrick Motorsports | Chevrolet |
| 31 | Justin Haley | Kaulig Racing | Chevrolet |
| 34 | Michael McDowell | Front Row Motorsports | Ford |
| 38 | Zane Smith (i) | Front Row Motorsports | Ford |
| 41 | Ryan Preece | Stewart-Haas Racing | Ford |
| 42 | Noah Gragson (R) | Legacy Motor Club | Chevrolet |
| 43 | Erik Jones | Legacy Motor Club | Chevrolet |
| 45 | Tyler Reddick | 23XI Racing | Toyota |
| 47 | Ricky Stenhouse Jr. | JTG Daugherty Racing | Chevrolet |
| 48 | Alex Bowman | Hendrick Motorsports | Chevrolet |
| 51 | Cody Ware | Rick Ware Racing | Ford |
| 54 | Ty Gibbs (R) | Joe Gibbs Racing | Toyota |
| 77 | Ty Dillon | Spire Motorsports | Chevrolet |
| 78 | B. J. McLeod | Live Fast Motorsports | Chevrolet |
| 99 | Daniel Suárez | Trackhouse Racing | Chevrolet |
Official entry list

== Practice ==
Kyle Larson was the fastest in the practice session with a time of 27.427 seconds and a speed of 131.258 mph (211.239 km/h).

=== Practice results ===
| Pos | No. | Driver | Team | Manufacturer | Time | Speed |
|---|---|---|---|---|---|---|
| 1 | 5 | Kyle Larson | Hendrick Motorsports | Chevrolet | 27.427 | 131.258 |
| 2 | 12 | Ryan Blaney | Team Penske | Ford | 27.459 | 131.105 |
| 3 | 48 | Alex Bowman | Hendrick Motorsports | Chevrolet | 27.539 | 130.724 |
Official practice results

== Qualifying ==
Kyle Larson scored the pole for the race with a time of 27.642 and a speed of 130.237 mph (209.596 km/h).

=== Qualifying results ===
| Pos | No. | Driver | Team | Manufacturer | R1 | R2 |
|---|---|---|---|---|---|---|
| 1 | 5 | Kyle Larson | Hendrick Motorsports | Chevrolet | 27.324 | 27.642 |
| 2 | 11 | Denny Hamlin | Joe Gibbs Racing | Toyota | 27.634 | 27.707 |
| 3 | 24 | William Byron | Hendrick Motorsports | Chevrolet | 27.553 | 27.709 |
| 4 | 6 | Brad Keselowski | RFK Racing | Ford | 27.633 | 27.743 |
| 5 | 20 | Christopher Bell | Joe Gibbs Racing | Toyota | 27.632 | 27.782 |
| 6 | 1 | Ross Chastain | Trackhouse Racing | Chevrolet | 27.656 | 27.822 |
| 7 | 34 | Michael McDowell | Front Row Motorsports | Ford | 27.644 | 27.867 |
| 8 | 12 | Ryan Blaney | Team Penske | Ford | 27.642 | 27.899 |
| 9 | 8 | Kyle Busch | Richard Childress Racing | Chevrolet | 27.623 | 27.918 |
| 10 | 43 | Erik Jones | Legacy Motor Club | Chevrolet | 27.556 | 27.933 |
| 11 | 99 | Daniel Suárez | Trackhouse Racing | Chevrolet | 27.660 | — |
| 12 | 45 | Tyler Reddick | 23XI Racing | Toyota | 27.666 | — |
| 13 | 19 | Martin Truex Jr. | Joe Gibbs Racing | Toyota | 27.667 | — |
| 14 | 54 | Ty Gibbs (R) | Joe Gibbs Racing | Toyota | 27.671 | — |
| 15 | 4 | Kevin Harvick | Stewart-Haas Racing | Ford | 27.683 | — |
| 16 | 22 | Joey Logano | Team Penske | Ford | 27.700 | — |
| 17 | 9 | Josh Berry (i) | Hendrick Motorsports | Chevrolet | 27.716 | — |
| 18 | 48 | Alex Bowman | Hendrick Motorsports | Chevrolet | 27.723 | — |
| 19 | 23 | Bubba Wallace | 23XI Racing | Toyota | 27.750 | — |
| 20 | 2 | Austin Cindric | Team Penske | Ford | 27.753 | — |
| 21 | 17 | Chris Buescher | RFK Racing | Ford | 27.757 | — |
| 22 | 16 | A. J. Allmendinger | Kaulig Racing | Chevrolet | 27.762 | — |
| 23 | 47 | Ricky Stenhouse Jr. | JTG Daugherty Racing | Chevrolet | 27.766 | — |
| 24 | 14 | Chase Briscoe | Stewart-Haas Racing | Ford | 27.779 | — |
| 25 | 41 | Ryan Preece | Stewart-Haas Racing | Ford | 27.784 | — |
| 26 | 31 | Justin Haley | Kaulig Racing | Chevrolet | 27.870 | — |
| 27 | 21 | Harrison Burton | Wood Brothers Racing | Ford | 27.974 | — |
| 28 | 7 | Corey LaJoie | Spire Motorsports | Chevrolet | 27.988 | — |
| 29 | 15 | Todd Gilliland | Rick Ware Racing | Ford | 28.042 | — |
| 30 | 3 | Austin Dillon | Richard Childress Racing | Chevrolet | 28.058 | — |
| 31 | 10 | Aric Almirola | Stewart-Haas Racing | Ford | 28.084 | — |
| 32 | 42 | Noah Gragson (R) | Legacy Motor Club | Chevrolet | 28.140 | — |
| 33 | 78 | B. J. McLeod | Live Fast Motorsports | Chevrolet | 28.194 | — |
| 34 | 38 | Zane Smith (i) | Front Row Motorsports | Ford | 28.324 | — |
| 35 | 77 | Ty Dillon | Spire Motorsports | Chevrolet | 28.752 | — |
| 36 | 51 | Cody Ware | Rick Ware Racing | Ford | 28.854 | — |
Official qualifying results

== Race ==
=== Race results ===
==== Stage Results ====
Stage One Laps: 60

| Pos | No | Driver | Team | Manufacturer | Points |
|---|---|---|---|---|---|
| 1 | 24 | William Byron | Hendrick Motorsports | Chevrolet | 10 |
| 2 | 5 | Kyle Larson | Hendrick Motorsports | Chevrolet | 9 |
| 3 | 11 | Denny Hamlin | Joe Gibbs Racing | Toyota | 8 |
| 4 | 20 | Christopher Bell | Joe Gibbs Racing | Toyota | 7 |
| 5 | 45 | Tyler Reddick | 23XI Racing | Toyota | 6 |
| 6 | 12 | Ryan Blaney | Team Penske | Ford | 5 |
| 7 | 1 | Ross Chastain | Trackhouse Racing | Chevrolet | 4 |
| 8 | 4 | Kevin Harvick | Stewart-Haas Racing | Ford | 3 |
| 9 | 6 | Brad Keselowski | RFK Racing | Ford | 2 |
| 10 | 8 | Kyle Busch | Richard Childress Racing | Chevrolet | 1 |
Official stage one results

Stage Two Laps: 125

| Pos | No | Driver | Team | Manufacturer | Points |
|---|---|---|---|---|---|
| 1 | 5 | Kyle Larson | Hendrick Motorsports | Chevrolet | 10 |
| 2 | 24 | William Byron | Hendrick Motorsports | Chevrolet | 9 |
| 3 | 4 | Kevin Harvick | Stewart-Haas Racing | Ford | 8 |
| 4 | 6 | Brad Keselowski | RFK Racing | Ford | 7 |
| 5 | 45 | Tyler Reddick | 23XI Racing | Toyota | 6 |
| 6 | 11 | Denny Hamlin | Joe Gibbs Racing | Toyota | 5 |
| 7 | 20 | Christopher Bell | Joe Gibbs Racing | Toyota | 4 |
| 8 | 12 | Ryan Blaney | Team Penske | Ford | 3 |
| 9 | 1 | Ross Chastain | Trackhouse Racing | Chevrolet | 2 |
| 10 | 14 | Chase Briscoe | Stewart-Haas Racing | Ford | 1 |
Official stage two results

=== Final Stage Results ===
Stage Three Laps: 127

| Pos | Grid | No | Driver | Team | Manufacturer | Laps | Points |
|---|---|---|---|---|---|---|---|
| 1 | 3 | 24 | William Byron (Note: All four Hendrick Motorsports entries and Justin Haley were initially docked 100 points (owners only for the No. 9) for irregularities in the louvers that were discovered in the pre-race inspection. However, following an appeal on March 29th, all four Hendrick Motorsports entries had their point penalties rescinded. Haley's penalty was upheld upon appeal on April 5th, but the points penalty was reduced to a 75 point penalty and rescinded altogether on a final appeal on April 18th.) | Hendrick Motorsports | Chevrolet | 317 | 59 |
| 2 | 8 | 12 | Ryan Blaney | Team Penske | Ford | 317 | 43 |
| 3 | 12 | 45 | Tyler Reddick | 23XI Racing | Toyota | 317 | 46 |
| 4 | 1 | 5 | Kyle Larson | Hendrick Motorsports | Chevrolet | 317 | 52 |
| 5 | 15 | 4 | Kevin Harvick | Stewart-Haas Racing | Ford | 317 | 43 |
| 6 | 5 | 20 | Christopher Bell | Joe Gibbs Racing | Toyota | 317 | 42 |
| 7 | 24 | 14 | Chase Briscoe | Stewart-Haas Racing | Ford | 317 | 31 |
| 8 | 9 | 8 | Kyle Busch | Richard Childress Racing | Chevrolet | 317 | 30 |
| 9 | 18 | 48 | Alex Bowman | Hendrick Motorsports | Chevrolet | 317 | 28 |
| 10 | 17 | 9 | Josh Berry (i) | Hendrick Motorsports | Chevrolet | 317 | 0 |
| 11 | 16 | 22 | Joey Logano | Team Penske | Ford | 317 | 26 |
| 12 | 25 | 41 | Ryan Preece | Stewart-Haas Racing | Ford | 317 | 25 |
| 13 | 7 | 34 | Michael McDowell | Front Row Motorsports | Ford | 317 | 24 |
| 14 | 19 | 23 | Bubba Wallace | 23XI Racing | Toyota | 317 | 23 |
| 15 | 21 | 17 | Chris Buescher | RFK Racing | Ford | 317 | 22 |
| 16 | 30 | 3 | Austin Dillon | Richard Childress Racing | Chevrolet | 317 | 21 |
| 17 | 13 | 19 | Martin Truex Jr. | Joe Gibbs Racing | Toyota | 317 | 20 |
| 18 | 4 | 6 | Brad Keselowski | RFK Racing | Ford | 317 | 28 |
| 19 | 23 | 47 | Ricky Stenhouse Jr. | JTG Daugherty Racing | Chevrolet | 317 | 18 |
| 20 | 22 | 16 | A. J. Allmendinger | Kaulig Racing | Chevrolet | 317 | 17 |
| 21 | 10 | 43 | Erik Jones | Legacy Motor Club | Chevrolet | 317 | 16 |
| 22 | 11 | 99 | Daniel Suárez | Trackhouse Racing | Chevrolet | 317 | 15 |
| 23 | 2 | 11 | Denny Hamlin (Note: Hamlin was docked 25 driver points for intentionally wrecking Ross Chastain in the final stage, after Hamlin admitted to the intentional nature of the wreck in his Actions Detrimental podcast.) | Joe Gibbs Racing | Toyota | 317 | 2 |
| 24 | 6 | 1 | Ross Chastain | Trackhouse Racing | Chevrolet | 317 | 19 |
| 25 | 20 | 2 | Austin Cindric | Team Penske | Ford | 316 | 12 |
| 26 | 28 | 7 | Corey LaJoie | Spire Motorsports | Chevrolet | 316 | 11 |
| 27 | 26 | 31 | Justin Haley | Kaulig Racing | Chevrolet | 316 | 10 |
| 28 | 14 | 54 | Ty Gibbs (R) | Joe Gibbs Racing | Toyota | 316 | 9 |
| 29 | 32 | 42 | Noah Gragson (R) | Legacy Motor Club | Chevrolet | 316 | 8 |
| 30 | 35 | 77 | Ty Dillon | Spire Motorsports | Chevrolet | 315 | 7 |
| 31 | 34 | 38 | Zane Smith (i) | Front Row Motorsports | Ford | 315 | 0 |
| 32 | 29 | 15 | Todd Gilliland | Rick Ware Racing | Ford | 314 | 5 |
| 33 | 31 | 10 | Aric Almirola | Stewart-Haas Racing | Ford | 313 | 4 |
| 34 | 36 | 51 | Cody Ware | Rick Ware Racing | Ford | 311 | 3 |
| 35 | 27 | 21 | Harrison Burton | Wood Brothers Racing | Ford | 310 | 2 |
| 36 | 33 | 78 | B. J. McLeod | Live Fast Motorsports | Chevrolet | 50 | 1 |
Official race results

=== Race statistics ===
- Lead changes: 10 among 6 different drivers
- Cautions/Laps: 5 for 35 laps
- Red flags: 0
- Time of race: 3 hours, 0 minutes and 18 seconds
- Average speed: 105.491 miles per hour (169.771 km/h)

=== Penalties ===
Prior to the race, NASCAR confiscated the louvers (the hood radiator duct) of all Hendrick Motorsports teams and that belonging to Justin Haley (Kaulig Racing)'s car. On March 15, 2023, NASCAR punished all five teams with $100,000 fine and deduction of 100 driver and owner points each, as well as 10 playoff points and four-race suspensions for the respective crew chiefs, as the modifications were deemed to be an L2 violation. For the No. 9 team, only the owner points were affected as Josh Berry competed as a Xfinity Series regular and thus cannot score or lose points in the Cup Series, while Chase Elliott's driver points remain unaffected as he sat out of the race due to an injury. For Hendrick Motorsports, it was the largest fine imposed to an organization as a whole at $400,000, breaking the fine imposed to Michael Waltrip Racing in 2013 ($300,000) for manipulating the finish of the 2013 Federated Auto Parts 400.

Following an appeal on March 29, 2023, the National Motorsports Appeals Panel upheld the fines and crew chief suspensions for all of the Hendrick Motorsports entries, but rescinded their point penalties giving them back the 100 driver & owner points as well as the 10 playoff points that each team lost. Haley's penalty was upheld following his appeal on April 5, 2023, but the points penalty was reduced to a 75 point penalty. On April 6, 2023, Kaulig Racing announced they would move to a final appeal hearing with the National Motorsports Appeal Panel, after team president Chris Rice hinted on NASCAR Race Hub the evening prior that they would do so. On April 18, the NMPA overturned the points penalties at the request of NASCAR, who asked them to amend their appeal decision to be more in line with Hendrick Motorsport's appeal decision.

Additionally, Denny Hamlin was fined $50,000 and docked 25 driver points for his collision with Ross Chastain, after he admitted on his Actions Detrimental podcast that the collision was deliberate. Hamlin appealed the penalty on April 6, 2023, but the National Motorsports Appeal Panel upheld the penalty. Two of Aric Almirola's crew members were also suspended after his right-front wheel fell out during the race.

== Media ==
=== Television ===
Fox Sports covered their 18th race at the Phoenix Raceway. Mike Joy, Clint Bowyer and Danica Patrick called the race in the booth for Fox. Jamie Little and Regan Smith handled the pit road duties, and Larry McReynolds provided insight from the Fox Sports studio in Charlotte.

Fox
| Booth announcers | Pit reporters | In-race analyst |
|---|---|---|
| Lap-by-lap: Mike Joy; Color-commentator: Clint Bowyer; Color-commentator: Danica Patrick | Jamie Little; Regan Smith | Larry McReynolds |

=== Radio ===
MRN covered the radio action for the race which was also simulcasted on Sirius XM NASCAR Radio. Alex Hayden, Jeff Striegle, and 2018 NASCAR champion winning crew chief Todd Gordon called the race when the field races past the start/finish line. Dan Hubbard called the action from turns 1 & 2, and Kyle Rickey called the action from turns 3 & 4. Pit lane was manned by Steve Post and Georgia Henneberry.

MRN
| Booth announcers | Turn announcers | Pit reporters |
|---|---|---|
| Lead announcer: Alex Hayden; Announcer: Jeff Striegle; Announcer: Todd Gordon | Turns 1 & 2: Dan Hubbard; Turns 3 & 4: Kyle Rickey | Steve Post; Georgia Henneberry |

== Standings after the race ==
Drivers' Championship standings

| | Pos | Driver | Points |
|---|---|---|---|
| 2 | 1 | Kevin Harvick | 151 |
| 1 | 2 | Ross Chastain | 148 (–3) |
| 4 | 3 | Christopher Bell | 137 (–14) |
| 11 | 4 | Ryan Blaney | 124 (–27) |
| 3 | 5 | Kyle Busch | 122 (–29) |
| 1 | 6 | Martin Truex Jr. | 122 (–29) |
| 3 | 7 | Daniel Suárez | 119 (–32) |
| 1 | 8 | Joey Logano | 118 (–33) |
| 2 | 9 | Brad Keselowski | 115 (–36) |
| | 10 | Chris Buescher | 112 (–39) |
| 1 | 11 | Ricky Stenhouse Jr. | 104 (–47) |
| 6 | 12 | Denny Hamlin | 100 (–51) |
| 3 | 13 | Bubba Wallace | 92 (–59) |
| 3 | 14 | Austin Cindric | 81 (-70) |
| 3 | 15 | Corey LaJoie | 79 (-72) |
| 3 | 16 | Michael McDowell | 76 (-75) |
Official driver's standings (before penalties)

Manufacturers' Championship standings

| Pos | Manufacturer | Points |
|---|---|---|
| 1 | Chevrolet | 160 |
| 2 | Ford | 133 (–27) |
| 3 | Toyota | 132 (–28) |

- Note: Only the first 16 positions are included for the driver standings.

== Notes ==
| Previous race: 2023 Pennzoil 400 | NASCAR Cup Series; 2023 season | Next race: 2023 Ambetter Health 400 |
