= 2025 Pennzoil 400 =

Race details
- Race 5 of 36 in the 2025 NASCAR Cup Series
- Date: March 16, 2025
- Location: Las Vegas Motor Speedway in Las Vegas
- Course: Permanent racing facility
- Course length: 1.5 miles (2.4 km)
- Distance: 267 laps, 400.5 mi (640.8 km)
- Average speed: 124.368 miles per hour (200.151 km/h)

Pole position
Driver	Michael McDowell	Spire Motorsports
- Time: 28.883

Most laps led
Driver	Kyle Larson	Hendrick Motorsports
- Laps: 61

Fastest lap
Driver	Tyler Reddick	23XI Racing
- Time: 29.194

Winner
No. 21	Josh Berry	Wood Brothers Racing

Television in the United States
- Network: FS1
- Announcers: Mike Joy, Clint Bowyer, and Kevin Harvick
- Nielsen ratings: 1.48 (3.01 million)

Radio in the United States
- Radio: PRN
- Booth announcers: Brad Gillie and Mark Garrow
- Turn announcers: Nick Yeoman (1 & 2) and Pat Patterson (3 & 4)

The 2025 Pennzoil 400 was a NASCAR Cup Series race held on March 16, 2025, at Las Vegas Motor Speedway in North Las Vegas, Nevada. Contested over 267 laps on the 1.5 mi (2.4 km) asphalt intermediate speedway, it was the fifth race of the 2025 NASCAR Cup Series season.

Josh Berry won the race, his first career win. This marked the first time a driver has scored their first win at Las Vegas. Daniel Suárez finished 2nd, and Ryan Preece finished 3rd. William Byron and Ross Chastain rounded out the top five, and Austin Cindric, Alex Bowman, A. J. Allmendinger, Kyle Larson, and Chase Elliott rounded out the top ten.

== Report ==
=== Background ===
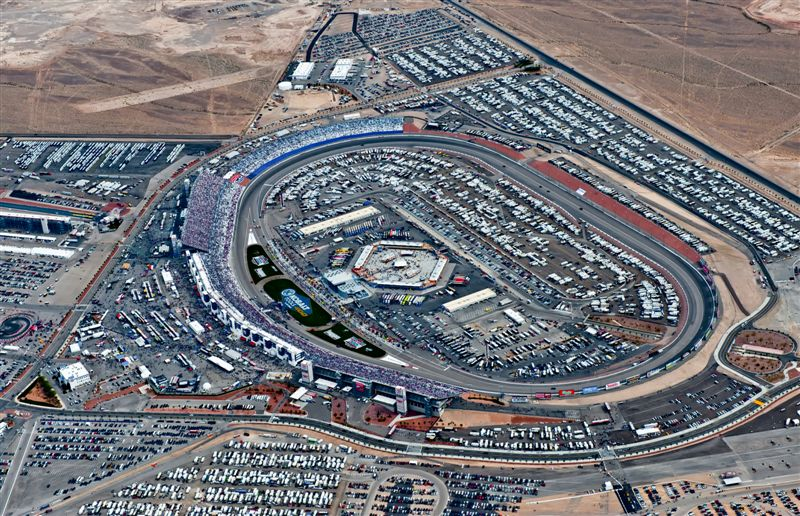
Las Vegas Motor Speedway, the track where the race was held.

Las Vegas Motor Speedway, located in Clark County, Nevada outside the Las Vegas city limits and about 15 miles northeast of the Las Vegas Strip, is a 1,200-acre (490 ha) complex of multiple tracks for motorsports racing. The complex is owned by Speedway Motorsports, Inc., which is headquartered in Charlotte, North Carolina.

==== Entry list ====
- (R) denotes rookie driver.
- (i) denotes driver who is ineligible for series driver points.

No.	Driver	Team	Manufacturer
1	Ross Chastain	Trackhouse Racing	Chevrolet
2	Austin Cindric	Team Penske	Ford
3	Austin Dillon	Richard Childress Racing	Chevrolet
4	Noah Gragson	Front Row Motorsports	Ford
5	Kyle Larson	Hendrick Motorsports	Chevrolet
6	Brad Keselowski	RFK Racing	Ford
7	Justin Haley	Spire Motorsports	Chevrolet
8	Kyle Busch	Richard Childress Racing	Chevrolet
9	Chase Elliott	Hendrick Motorsports	Chevrolet
10	Ty Dillon	Kaulig Racing	Chevrolet
11	Denny Hamlin	Joe Gibbs Racing	Toyota
12	Ryan Blaney	Team Penske	Ford
16	A. J. Allmendinger	Kaulig Racing	Chevrolet
17	Chris Buescher	RFK Racing	Ford
19	Chase Briscoe	Joe Gibbs Racing	Toyota
20	Christopher Bell	Joe Gibbs Racing	Toyota
21	Josh Berry	Wood Brothers Racing	Ford
22	Joey Logano	Team Penske	Ford
23	Bubba Wallace	23XI Racing	Toyota
24	William Byron	Hendrick Motorsports	Chevrolet
34	Todd Gilliland	Front Row Motorsports	Ford
35	Riley Herbst (R)	23XI Racing	Toyota
38	Zane Smith	Front Row Motorsports	Ford
41	Cole Custer	Haas Factory Team	Ford
42	John Hunter Nemechek	Legacy Motor Club	Toyota
43	Erik Jones	Legacy Motor Club	Toyota
45	Tyler Reddick	23XI Racing	Toyota
47	Ricky Stenhouse Jr.	Hyak Motorsports	Chevrolet
48	Alex Bowman	Hendrick Motorsports	Chevrolet
51	Cody Ware	Rick Ware Racing	Ford
54	Ty Gibbs	Joe Gibbs Racing	Toyota
60	Ryan Preece	RFK Racing	Ford
71	Michael McDowell	Spire Motorsports	Chevrolet
77	Carson Hocevar	Spire Motorsports	Chevrolet
88	Shane van Gisbergen (R)	Trackhouse Racing	Chevrolet
99	Daniel Suárez	Trackhouse Racing	Chevrolet
Official entry list

== Practice ==
Ross Chastain was the fastest in the practice session with a time of 28.747 seconds and a speed of 187.845 mph (302.307 km/h).

=== Practice results ===
Pos	No.	Driver	Team	Manufacturer	Time	Speed
1	1	Ross Chastain	Trackhouse Racing	Chevrolet	28.747	187.845
2	23	Bubba Wallace	23XI Racing	Toyota	28.987	186.290
3	24	William Byron	Hendrick Motorsports	Chevrolet	29.005	186.147
Official practice results

== Qualifying ==
Michael McDowell scored the pole for the race with a time of 28.883 and a speed of 186.961 mph (300.885 km/h). This is the 1st career Cup Series pole for Spire Motorsports.

=== Qualifying results ===
Pos	No.	Driver	Team	Manufacturer	Time	Speed
1	71	Michael McDowell	Spire Motorsports	Chevrolet	28.883	186.961
2	22	Joey Logano	Team Penske	Ford	28.898	186.864
3	2	Austin Cindric	Team Penske	Ford	28.909	186.793
4	8	Kyle Busch	Richard Childress Racing	Chevrolet	28.933	186.638
5	43	Erik Jones	Legacy Motor Club	Toyota	28.934	186.632
6	48	Alex Bowman	Hendrick Motorsports	Chevrolet	28.936	186.619
7	21	Josh Berry	Wood Brothers Racing	Ford	28.939	186.599
8	24	William Byron	Hendrick Motorsports	Chevrolet	28.944	186.567
9	38	Zane Smith	Front Row Motorsports	Ford	28.946	186.554
10	5	Kyle Larson	Hendrick Motorsports	Chevrolet	28.950	186.528
11	17	Chris Buescher	RFK Racing	Ford	28.964	186.438
12	60	Ryan Preece	RFK Racing	Ford	28.967	186.419
13	20	Christopher Bell	Joe Gibbs Racing	Toyota	28.984	186.310
14	45	Tyler Reddick	23XI Racing	Toyota	28.991	186.265
15	11	Denny Hamlin	Joe Gibbs Racing	Toyota	28.995	186.239
16	9	Chase Elliott	Hendrick Motorsports	Chevrolet	29.000	186.207
17	10	Ty Dillon	Kaulig Racing	Chevrolet	29.019	186.085
18	16	A. J. Allmendinger	Kaulig Racing	Chevrolet	29.020	186.079
19	1	Ross Chastain	Trackhouse Racing	Chevrolet	29.021	186.072
20	23	Bubba Wallace	23XI Racing	Toyota	29.035	185.982
21	4	Noah Gragson	Front Row Motorsports	Ford	29.059	185.829
22	3	Austin Dillon	Richard Childress Racing	Chevrolet	29.068	185.771
23	99	Daniel Suárez	Trackhouse Racing	Chevrolet	29.082	185.682
24	19	Chase Briscoe	Joe Gibbs Racing	Toyota	29.131	185.370
25	77	Carson Hocevar	Spire Motorsports	Chevrolet	29.133	185.357
26	41	Cole Custer	Haas Factory Team	Ford	29.135	185.344
27	6	Brad Keselowski	RFK Racing	Ford	29.149	185.255
28	88	Shane van Gisbergen (R)	Trackhouse Racing	Chevrolet	29.185	185.027
29	54	Ty Gibbs	Joe Gibbs Racing	Toyota	29.191	184.989
30	42	John Hunter Nemechek	Legacy Motor Club	Toyota	29.243	184.660
31	47	Ricky Stenhouse Jr.	Hyak Motorsports	Chevrolet	29.285	184.395
32	34	Todd Gilliland	Front Row Motorsports	Ford	29.344	184.024
33	7	Justin Haley	Spire Motorsports	Chevrolet	29.371	183.855
34	35	Riley Herbst (R)	23XI Racing	Toyota	29.788	181.281
35	51	Cody Ware	Rick Ware Racing	Ford	30.093	179.444
36	12	Ryan Blaney	Team Penske	Ford	0.000	0.000
Official qualifying results

== Race ==
=== Race results ===
==== Stage Results ====
Stage One Laps: 80

Pos	No	Driver	Team	Manufacturer	Points
1	2	Austin Cindric	Team Penske	Ford	10
2	48	Alex Bowman	Hendrick Motorsports	Chevrolet	9
3	9	Chase Elliott	Hendrick Motorsports	Chevrolet	8
4	23	Bubba Wallace	23XI Racing	Toyota	7
5	5	Kyle Larson	Hendrick Motorsports	Chevrolet	6
6	16	A. J. Allmendinger	Kaulig Racing	Chevrolet	5
7	22	Joey Logano	Team Penske	Ford	4
8	21	Josh Berry	Wood Brothers Racing	Ford	3
9	77	Carson Hocevar	Spire Motorsports	Chevrolet	2
10	20	Christopher Bell	Joe Gibbs Racing	Toyota	1
Official stage one results

Stage Two Laps: 85

Pos	No	Driver	Team	Manufacturer	Points
1	5	Kyle Larson	Hendrick Motorsports	Chevrolet	10
2	24	William Byron	Hendrick Motorsports	Chevrolet	9
3	1	Ross Chastain	Trackhouse Racing	Chevrolet	8
4	23	Bubba Wallace	23XI Racing	Toyota	7
5	77	Carson Hocevar	Spire Motorsports	Chevrolet	6
6	12	Ryan Blaney	Team Penske	Ford	5
7	99	Daniel Suárez	Trackhouse Racing	Chevrolet	4
8	21	Josh Berry	Wood Brothers Racing	Ford	3
9	45	Tyler Reddick	23XI Racing	Toyota	2
10	47	Ricky Stenhouse Jr.	Hyak Motorsports	Chevrolet	1
Official stage two results

=== Final Stage Results ===
Stage Three Laps: 102

Pos	Grid	No	Driver	Team	Manufacturer	Laps	Points
1	7	21	Josh Berry	Wood Brothers Racing	Ford	267	46
2	23	99	Daniel Suárez	Trackhouse Racing	Chevrolet	267	39
3	12	60	Ryan Preece	RFK Racing	Ford	267	34
4	8	24	William Byron	Hendrick Motorsports	Chevrolet	267	42
5	19	1	Ross Chastain	Trackhouse Racing	Chevrolet	267	40
6	3	2	Austin Cindric	Team Penske	Ford	267	41
7	6	48	Alex Bowman	Hendrick Motorsports	Chevrolet	267	39
8	18	16	A. J. Allmendinger	Kaulig Racing	Chevrolet	267	34
9	10	5	Kyle Larson	Hendrick Motorsports	Chevrolet	267	44
10	16	9	Chase Elliott	Hendrick Motorsports	Chevrolet	267	35
11	27	6	Brad Keselowski	RFK Racing	Ford	267	26
12	13	20	Christopher Bell	Joe Gibbs Racing	Toyota	267	26
13	11	17	Chris Buescher	RFK Racing	Ford	267	24
14	33	7	Justin Haley	Spire Motorsports	Chevrolet	267	23
15	2	22	Joey Logano	Team Penske	Ford	267	26
16	1	71	Michael McDowell	Spire Motorsports	Chevrolet	267	21
17	24	19	Chase Briscoe	Joe Gibbs Racing	Toyota	267	20
18	31	47	Ricky Stenhouse Jr.	Hyak Motorsports	Chevrolet	267	20
19	34	35	Riley Herbst (R)	23XI Racing	Toyota	267	18
20	30	42	John Hunter Nemechek	Legacy Motor Club	Toyota	267	17
21	17	10	Ty Dillon	Kaulig Racing	Chevrolet	267	16
22	29	54	Ty Gibbs	Joe Gibbs Racing	Toyota	267	15
23	9	38	Zane Smith	Front Row Motorsports	Ford	267	14
24	14	45	Tyler Reddick	23XI Racing	Toyota	267	15
25	15	11	Denny Hamlin	Joe Gibbs Racing	Toyota	267	12
26	26	41	Cole Custer	Haas Factory Team	Ford	267	11
27	5	43	Erik Jones	Legacy Motor Club	Toyota	266	10
28	20	23	Bubba Wallace	23XI Racing	Toyota	266	23
29	32	34	Todd Gilliland	Front Row Motorsports	Ford	265	8
30	25	77	Carson Hocevar	Spire Motorsports	Chevrolet	265	15
31	21	4	Noah Gragson	Front Row Motorsports	Ford	241	6
32	22	3	Austin Dillon	Richard Childress Racing	Chevrolet	240	5
33	4	8	Kyle Busch	Richard Childress Racing	Chevrolet	232	4
34	28	88	Shane van Gisbergen (R)	Trackhouse Racing	Chevrolet	195	3
35	36	12	Ryan Blaney	Team Penske	Ford	194	7
36	35	51	Cody Ware	Rick Ware Racing	Ford	186	1
Official race results

=== Race statistics ===
- Lead changes: 32 among 13 different drivers
- Cautions/Laps: 9 for 93
- Red flags: 0
- Time of race: 3 hours, 13 minutes and 13 seconds
- Average speed: 124.368 miles per hour (200.151 km/h)

== Media ==
=== Television ===
Fox Sports was carried by FS1 in the United States. Mike Joy, Clint Bowyer, and two-time Las Vegas winner Kevin Harvick called the race from the broadcast booth. Jamie Little and Regan Smith handled pit road for the television side, and Larry McReynolds provided insight on-site during the race.

FS1
Booth announcers	Pit reporters	In-race analyst
Lap-by-lap: Mike Joy; Color-commentator: Clint Bowyer; Color-commentator: Kevin Harvick	Jamie Little; Regan Smith	Larry McReynolds

=== Radio ===
PRN covered the radio call for the race which was also simulcasted on Sirius XM NASCAR Radio. Brad Gillie and Mark Garrow called the race in the booth where the field raced through the tri-oval. Nick Yeoman called the race from a billboard in turn 2 where the field raced through turns 1 and 2. Pat Patterson called the race from a billboard outside of turn 3 where the field raced through turns 3 and 4. Wendy Venturini, Brett McMillan, and Heather Debeaux worked pit road for the radio side.

PRN
Booth announcers	Turn announcers	Pit reporters
Lead announcer: Brad Gillie; Announcer: Mark Garrow	Turns 1 & 2: Nick Yeoman; Turns 3 & 4: Pat Patterson	Wendy Venturini; Brett McMillan; Heather Debeaux

== Standings after the race ==
Drivers' Championship standings

	Pos	Driver	Points
	1	William Byron	207
	2	Christopher Bell	178 (–29)
	3	Tyler Reddick	159 (–48)
1	4	Chase Elliott	159 (–48)
1	5	Alex Bowman	156 (–51)
5	6	Kyle Larson	152 (–55)
3	7	Ryan Blaney	143 (–64)
1	8	Joey Logano	136 (–71)
1	9	Chris Buescher	133 (–74)
6	10	Ross Chastain	128 (–79)
1	11	Bubba Wallace	125 (–82)
5	12	Denny Hamlin	122 (–85)
8	13	Josh Berry	119 (–88)
1	14	Michael McDowell	117 (–90)
2	15	John Hunter Nemechek	116 (–91)
2	16	Ricky Stenhouse Jr.	116 (–91)
Official driver's standings

Manufacturers' Championship standings

Pos	Manufacturer	Points
1	Toyota	180
2	Chevrolet	179 (–1)
3	Ford	166 (–14)

- Note: Only the first 16 positions are included for the driver standings.

Previous race: 2025 Shriners Children's 500	NASCAR Cup Series; 2025 season	Next race: 2025 Straight Talk Wireless 400
