= 2023 Pennzoil 400 =

Third race of the 2023 NASCAR Cup Series

Race details
- Race 3 of 36 in the 2023 NASCAR Cup Series
- Date: March 5, 2023
- Location: Las Vegas Motor Speedway in Las Vegas
- Course: Permanent racing facility
- Course length: 1.5 miles (2.4 km)
- Distance: 271 laps, 406.5 mi (650.4 km)
- Scheduled distance: 267 laps, 400.5 mi (640.8 km)
- Average speed: 142.98 miles per hour (230.10 km/h)

Pole position
Driver	Joey Logano	Team Penske
- Time: 29.024

Most laps led
Driver	William Byron	Hendrick Motorsports
- Laps: 176

Winner
No. 24	William Byron	Hendrick Motorsports

Television in the United States
- Network: Fox
- Announcers: Mike Joy, Clint Bowyer, and Danica Patrick

Radio in the United States
- Radio: PRN
- Booth announcers: Doug Rice and Mark Garrow
- Turn announcers: Rob Albright (1 & 2) and Pat Patterson (3 & 4)

The 2023 Pennzoil 400 presented by Jiffy Lube was a NASCAR Cup Series race held on March 5, 2023, at Las Vegas Motor Speedway in North Las Vegas, Nevada. Contested over 271 laps—extended from 267 laps due to an overtime finish, on the 1.5 mi (2.4 km) asphalt intermediate speedway and it was the third race of the 2023 NASCAR Cup Series season. Xfinity Series driver Josh Berry drove the No. 9 car for 2020 champion Chase Elliott, who sustained a leg injury in a snowboarding accident.

== Report ==
=== Background ===
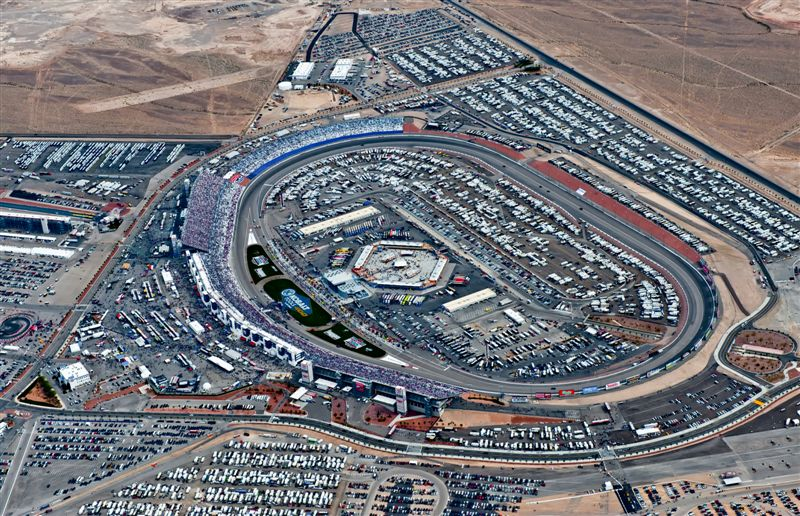
Las Vegas Motor Speedway, the track where the race was held.

Las Vegas Motor Speedway, located in Clark County, Nevada outside the Las Vegas city limits and about 15 miles northeast of the Las Vegas Strip, is a 1,200-acre (490 ha) complex of multiple tracks for motorsports racing. The complex is owned by Speedway Motorsports, Inc., which is headquartered in Charlotte, North Carolina.

==== Entry list ====
- (R) denotes rookie driver.
- (i) denotes driver who is ineligible for series driver points.

No.	Driver	Team	Manufacturer
1	Ross Chastain	Trackhouse Racing	Chevrolet
2	Austin Cindric	Team Penske	Ford
3	Austin Dillon	Richard Childress Racing	Chevrolet
4	Kevin Harvick	Stewart-Haas Racing	Ford
5	Kyle Larson	Hendrick Motorsports	Chevrolet
6	Brad Keselowski	RFK Racing	Ford
7	Corey LaJoie	Spire Motorsports	Chevrolet
8	Kyle Busch	Richard Childress Racing	Chevrolet
9	Josh Berry (i) (Note: Josh Berry replaced Chase Elliott after Elliott sustained a leg injury in a snowboarding accident.)	Hendrick Motorsports	Chevrolet
10	Aric Almirola	Stewart-Haas Racing	Ford
11	Denny Hamlin	Joe Gibbs Racing	Toyota
12	Ryan Blaney	Team Penske	Ford
14	Chase Briscoe	Stewart-Haas Racing	Ford
15	J. J. Yeley	Rick Ware Racing	Ford
16	A. J. Allmendinger	Kaulig Racing	Chevrolet
17	Chris Buescher	RFK Racing	Ford
19	Martin Truex Jr.	Joe Gibbs Racing	Toyota
20	Christopher Bell	Joe Gibbs Racing	Toyota
21	Harrison Burton	Wood Brothers Racing	Ford
22	Joey Logano	Team Penske	Ford
23	Bubba Wallace	23XI Racing	Toyota
24	William Byron	Hendrick Motorsports	Chevrolet
31	Justin Haley	Kaulig Racing	Chevrolet
34	Michael McDowell	Front Row Motorsports	Ford
38	Todd Gilliland	Front Row Motorsports	Ford
41	Ryan Preece	Stewart-Haas Racing	Ford
42	Noah Gragson (R)	Legacy Motor Club	Chevrolet
43	Erik Jones	Legacy Motor Club	Chevrolet
45	Tyler Reddick	23XI Racing	Toyota
47	Ricky Stenhouse Jr.	JTG Daugherty Racing	Chevrolet
48	Alex Bowman	Hendrick Motorsports	Chevrolet
51	Cody Ware	Rick Ware Racing	Ford
54	Ty Gibbs (R)	Joe Gibbs Racing	Toyota
77	Ty Dillon	Spire Motorsports	Chevrolet
78	B. J. McLeod	Live Fast Motorsports	Chevrolet
99	Daniel Suárez	Trackhouse Racing	Chevrolet
Official entry list

== Practice ==
Kyle Larson was the fastest in the practice session with a time of 29.283 seconds and a speed of 184.407 mph (296.774 km/h).

=== Practice results ===
Pos	No.	Driver	Team	Manufacturer	Time	Speed
1	5	Kyle Larson	Hendrick Motorsports	Chevrolet	29.283	184.407
2	12	Ryan Blaney	Team Penske	Ford	29.352	183.974
3	22	Joey Logano	Team Penske	Ford	29.357	183.943
Official practice results

== Qualifying ==
Joey Logano scored the pole for the race with a time of 29.024 and a speed of 186.053 mph (299.423 km/h).

=== Qualifying results ===
Pos	No.	Driver	Team	Manufacturer	R1	R2
1	22	Joey Logano	Team Penske	Ford	29.234	29.024
2	24	William Byron	Hendrick Motorsports	Chevrolet	29.327	29.165
3	12	Ryan Blaney	Team Penske	Ford	29.522	29.205
4	54	Ty Gibbs (R)	Joe Gibbs Racing	Toyota	29.295	29.262
5	8	Kyle Busch	Richard Childress Racing	Chevrolet	29.356	29.270
6	5	Kyle Larson	Hendrick Motorsports	Chevrolet	29.520	29.308
7	6	Brad Keselowski	RFK Racing	Ford	29.264	29.333
8	1	Ross Chastain	Trackhouse Racing	Chevrolet	29.297	29.387
9	2	Austin Cindric	Team Penske	Ford	29.245	29.401
10	20	Christopher Bell	Joe Gibbs Racing	Toyota	29.179	29.424
11	48	Alex Bowman	Hendrick Motorsports	Chevrolet	29.346	—
12	11	Denny Hamlin	Joe Gibbs Racing	Toyota	29.367	—
13	23	Bubba Wallace	23XI Racing	Toyota	29.392	—
14	4	Kevin Harvick	Stewart-Haas Racing	Ford	29.411	—
15	19	Martin Truex Jr.	Joe Gibbs Racing	Toyota	29.467	—
16	47	Ricky Stenhouse Jr.	JTG Daugherty Racing	Chevrolet	29.562	—
17	34	Michael McDowell	Front Row Motorsports	Ford	29.582	—
18	17	Chris Buescher	RFK Racing	Ford	29.593	—
19	7	Corey LaJoie	Spire Motorsports	Chevrolet	29.605	—
20	14	Chase Briscoe	Stewart-Haas Racing	Ford	29.610	—
21	10	Aric Almirola	Stewart-Haas Racing	Ford	29.611	—
22	43	Erik Jones	Legacy Motor Club	Chevrolet	29.629	—
23	16	A. J. Allmendinger	Kaulig Racing	Chevrolet	29.635	—
24	99	Daniel Suárez	Trackhouse Racing	Chevrolet	29.650	—
25	42	Noah Gragson (R)	Legacy Motor Club	Chevrolet	29.789	—
26	3	Austin Dillon	Richard Childress Racing	Chevrolet	29.810	—
27	31	Justin Haley	Kaulig Racing	Chevrolet	29.823	—
28	38	Todd Gilliland	Front Row Motorsports	Ford	29.892	—
29	15	J. J. Yeley	Rick Ware Racing	Ford	29.986	—
30	51	Cody Ware	Rick Ware Racing	Ford	29.994	—
31	41	Ryan Preece	Stewart-Haas Racing	Ford	30.034	—
32	9	Josh Berry (i)	Hendrick Motorsports	Chevrolet	30.153	—
33	77	Ty Dillon	Spire Motorsports	Chevrolet	30.686	—
34	21	Harrison Burton	Wood Brothers Racing	Ford	0.000	—
35	78	B. J. McLeod	Live Fast Motorsports	Chevrolet	0.000	—
36	45	Tyler Reddick	23XI Racing	Toyota	0.000	—
Official qualifying results

== Race ==
=== Race results ===
==== Stage Results ====
Stage One Laps: 80

Pos	No	Driver	Team	Manufacturer	Points
1	24	William Byron	Hendrick Motorsports	Chevrolet	10
2	5	Kyle Larson	Hendrick Motorsports	Chevrolet	9
3	1	Ross Chastain	Trackhouse Racing	Chevrolet	8
4	20	Christopher Bell	Joe Gibbs Racing	Toyota	7
5	11	Denny Hamlin	Joe Gibbs Racing	Toyota	6
6	19	Martin Truex Jr.	Joe Gibbs Racing	Toyota	5
7	48	Alex Bowman	Hendrick Motorsports	Chevrolet	4
8	23	Bubba Wallace	23XI Racing	Toyota	3
9	8	Kyle Busch	Richard Childress Racing	Chevrolet	2
10	6	Brad Keselowski	RFK Racing	Ford	1
Official stage one results

Stage Two Laps: 85

Pos	No	Driver	Team	Manufacturer	Points
1	24	William Byron	Hendrick Motorsports	Chevrolet	10
2	5	Kyle Larson	Hendrick Motorsports	Chevrolet	9
3	48	Alex Bowman	Hendrick Motorsports	Chevrolet	8
4	19	Martin Truex Jr.	Joe Gibbs Racing	Toyota	7
5	20	Christopher Bell	Joe Gibbs Racing	Toyota	6
6	23	Bubba Wallace	23XI Racing	Toyota	5
7	1	Ross Chastain	Trackhouse Racing	Chevrolet	4
8	11	Denny Hamlin	Joe Gibbs Racing	Toyota	3
9	6	Brad Keselowski	RFK Racing	Ford	2
10	4	Kevin Harvick	Stewart-Haas Racing	Ford	1
Official stage two results

=== Final Stage Results ===
Stage Three Laps: 102

Pos	Grid	No	Driver	Team	Manufacturer	Laps	Points
1	2	24	William Byron	Hendrick Motorsports	Chevrolet	271	60
2	6	5	Kyle Larson	Hendrick Motorsports	Chevrolet	271	53
3	11	48	Alex Bowman	Hendrick Motorsports	Chevrolet	271	46
4	13	23	Bubba Wallace	23XI Racing	Toyota	271	41
5	10	20	Christopher Bell	Joe Gibbs Racing	Toyota	271	45
6	9	2	Austin Cindric	Team Penske	Ford	271	31
7	15	19	Martin Truex Jr.	Joe Gibbs Racing	Toyota	271	42
8	27	31	Justin Haley	Kaulig Racing	Chevrolet	271	29
9	14	4	Kevin Harvick	Stewart-Haas Racing	Ford	271	29
10	24	99	Daniel Suárez	Trackhouse Racing	Chevrolet	271	27
11	12	11	Denny Hamlin	Joe Gibbs Racing	Toyota	271	35
12	8	1	Ross Chastain	Trackhouse Racing	Chevrolet	271	37
13	3	12	Ryan Blaney	Team Penske	Ford	271	24
14	5	8	Kyle Busch	Richard Childress Racing	Chevrolet	271	25
15	36	45	Tyler Reddick	23XI Racing	Toyota	271	22
16	21	10	Aric Almirola	Stewart-Haas Racing	Ford	271	21
17	7	6	Brad Keselowski	RFK Racing	Ford	271	23
18	23	16	A. J. Allmendinger	Kaulig Racing	Chevrolet	271	19
19	22	43	Erik Jones	Legacy Motor Club	Chevrolet	270	18
20	19	7	Corey LaJoie	Spire Motorsports	Chevrolet	270	17
21	18	17	Chris Buescher	RFK Racing	Ford	270	16
22	4	54	Ty Gibbs (R)	Joe Gibbs Racing	Toyota	270	15
23	31	41	Ryan Preece	Stewart-Haas Racing	Ford	270	14
24	16	47	Ricky Stenhouse Jr.	JTG Daugherty Racing	Chevrolet	270	13
25	17	34	Michael McDowell	Front Row Motorsports	Ford	270	12
26	34	21	Harrison Burton	Wood Brothers Racing	Ford	269	11
27	26	3	Austin Dillon	Richard Childress Racing	Chevrolet	269	10
28	20	14	Chase Briscoe	Stewart-Haas Racing	Ford	269	9
29	32	9	Josh Berry (i)	Hendrick Motorsports	Chevrolet	269	0
30	25	42	Noah Gragson (R)	Legacy Motor Club	Chevrolet	269	7
31	28	38	Todd Gilliland	Front Row Motorsports	Ford	268	6
32	35	78	B. J. McLeod	Live Fast Motorsports	Chevrolet	266	5
33	29	15	J. J. Yeley	Rick Ware Racing	Ford	265	4
34	33	77	Ty Dillon	Spire Motorsports	Chevrolet	265	3
35	30	51	Cody Ware	Rick Ware Racing	Ford	259	2
36	1	22	Joey Logano	Team Penske	Ford	183	1
Official race results

=== Race statistics ===
- Lead changes: 13 among 8 different drivers
- Cautions/Laps: 4 for 26
- Red flags: 0
- Time of race: 2 hours, 50 minutes and 35 seconds
- Average speed: 142.98 miles per hour (230.10 km/h)

== Media ==
=== Television ===
Fox Sports covered their 23rd race at the Las Vegas Motor Speedway. Mike Joy, Clint Bowyer and Danica Patrick called the race in the booth for Fox. Jamie Little and Regan Smith handled the pit road duties, and Larry McReynolds provided insight from the Fox Sports studio in Charlotte.

Fox
Booth announcers	Pit reporters	In-race analyst
Lap-by-lap: Mike Joy; Color-commentator: Clint Bowyer; Color-commentator: Danica Patrick	Jamie Little; Regan Smith	Larry McReynolds

=== Radio ===
PRN covered the radio call for the race which was also simulcasted on Sirius XM NASCAR Radio. Doug Rice and Mark Garrow called the race in the booth where the field raced through the tri-oval. Rob Albright called the race from a billboard in turn 2 where the field raced through turns 1 and 2. Pat Patterson called the race from a billboard outside of turn 3 where the field raced through turns 3 and 4. Brad Gillie, Brett McMillan, Wendy Venturini, and Heather Debeaux worked pit road for the radio side.

PRN
Booth announcers	Turn announcers	Pit reporters
Lead announcer: Doug Rice; Announcer: Mark Garrow	Turns 1 & 2: Rob Albright; Turns 3 & 4: Pat Patterson	Brad Gillie; Brett McMillan; Wendy Venturini; Heather Debeaux

== Standings after the race ==
Drivers' Championship standings

	Pos	Driver	Points
	1	Ross Chastain	129
1	2	Alex Bowman	126 (–3)
1	3	Kevin Harvick	108 (–21)
1	4	Daniel Suárez	104 (–25)
6	5	Martin Truex Jr.	102 (–27)
3	6	Denny Hamlin	99 (–30)
8	7	Christopher Bell	94 (–35)
	8	Kyle Busch	92 (–37)
7	9	Joey Logano	92 (–37)
4	10	Chris Buescher	90 (–39)
1	11	Brad Keselowski	87 (–42)
5	12	Ricky Stenhouse Jr.	86 (–43)
16	13	William Byron	85 (–44)
10	14	Kyle Larson	85 (–44)
3	15	Ryan Blaney	81 (–48)
10	16	Bubba Wallace	69 (–60)
Official driver's standings

Manufacturers' Championship standings

Pos	Manufacturer	Points
1	Chevrolet	120
2	Ford	98 (–22)
3	Toyota	98 (–22)

- Note: Only the first 16 positions are included for the driver standings.

== Notes ==
Previous race: 2023 Pala Casino 400	NASCAR Cup Series; 2023 season	Next race: 2023 United Rentals Work United 500
