= Cook Out 400 =

Cook Out 400 may refer to:

- Cook Out 400 (Martinsville), at Martinsville Speedway.
- Cook Out 400 (Richmond), at Richmond Raceway.

== See also ==
- Cook Out Southern 500
- Cook Out 200
- 2024 Cook Out 400 (disambiguation)
- 2025 Cook Out 400 (disambiguation)
- 2026 Cook Out 400 (disambiguation)
