= 2025 Cook Out 400 =

2025 Cook Out 400 may refer to:

- 2025 Cook Out 400 (Martinsville), at Martinsville Speedway on March 30
- 2025 Cook Out 400 (Richmond), at Richmond Raceway on August 16

== See also ==
- 2025 Cook Out Clash, at Bowman Gray Stadium on February 2
- 2025 Cook Out Southern 500, at Darlington Raceway on August 31
