= 2025 Coke Zero Sugar 400 =

Race details
- Race 26 of 36 in the 2025 NASCAR Cup Series
- 2025 Coke Zero Sugar 400 official program
- Date: August 23, 2025
- Location: Daytona International Speedway in Daytona Beach, Florida
- Course: Permanent racing facility
- Course length: 2.5 miles (4 km)
- Distance: 160 laps, 400 mi (640 km)
- Average speed: 130.909 miles per hour (210.678 km/h)

Pole position
Driver	Ryan Blaney	Team Penske
- Time: 3.600 (Pandemic Formula)

Most laps led
Driver	Ryan Blaney & Joey Logano	Team Penske
- Laps: 27

Fastest lap
Driver	A. J. Allmendinger	Kaulig Racing
- Time: 45.751

Winner
No. 12	Ryan Blaney	Team Penske

Television in the United States
- Network: NBC
- Announcers: Leigh Diffey, Jeff Burton, and Steve Letarte

Radio in the United States
- Radio: MRN
- Booth announcers: Alex Hayden, Mike Bagley, and Rusty Wallace
- Turn announcers: Dave Moody (1 & 2), Kurt Becker (Backstretch) and Tim Catafalmo (3 & 4)

The 2025 Coke Zero Sugar 400 was a NASCAR Cup Series race held on August 23, 2025, at Daytona International Speedway in Daytona Beach, Florida on the 2.5-mile (4.0 km) superspeedway. It was the 26th race of the 2025 NASCAR Cup Series season, and last race of the regular season.

Ryan Blaney won the race. Daniel Suárez finished 2nd, and Justin Haley finished 3rd. Cole Custer and Erik Jones rounded out the top five, and Kyle Larson, Chris Buescher, Ty Gibbs, Josh Berry, and Chase Elliott rounded out the top ten.

== Report ==
=== Background ===
Daytona International Speedway, the site of the race.

The race was held at Daytona International Speedway, a race track located in Daytona Beach, Florida, United States. Since opening in 1959, the track is the home of the Daytona 500, the most prestigious race in NASCAR. In addition to NASCAR, the track also hosts races of ARCA, AMA Superbike, USCC, SCCA, and Motocross. It features multiple layouts including the primary 2.5 miles (4.0 km) high speed tri-oval, a 3.56 miles (5.73 km) sports car course, a 2.95 miles (4.75 km) motorcycle course, and a .25 miles (0.40 km) karting and motorcycle flat-track. The track's 180-acre (73 ha) infield includes the 29-acre (12 ha) Lake Lloyd, which has hosted powerboat racing. The speedway is owned and operated by International Speedway Corporation.

The track was built in 1959 by NASCAR founder William "Bill" France, Sr. to host racing held at the former Daytona Beach Road Course. His banked design permitted higher speeds and gave fans a better view of the cars. Lights were installed around the track in 1998 and today, it is the third-largest single lit outdoor sports facility. The speedway has been renovated three times, with the infield renovated in 2004 and the track repaved twice — in 1978 and in 2010. On January 22, 2013, the track unveiled artist depictions of a renovated speedway. On July 5 of that year, ground was broken for a project that would remove the backstretch seating and completely redevelop the frontstretch seating. The renovation to the speedway is being worked on by Rossetti Architects. The project, named "Daytona Rising", was completed in January 2016, and it cost US $400 million, placing emphasis on improving fan experience with five expanded and redesigned fan entrances (called "injectors") as well as wider and more comfortable seating with more restrooms and concession stands. After the renovations, the track's grandstands include 101,000 permanent seats with the ability to increase permanent seating to 125,000. The project was completed before the start of Speedweeks.

==== Entry list ====
- (R) denotes rookie driver.
- (i) denotes driver who is ineligible for series driver points.

No.	Driver	Team	Manufacturer
1	Ross Chastain	Trackhouse Racing	Chevrolet
2	Austin Cindric	Team Penske	Ford
3	Austin Dillon	Richard Childress Racing	Chevrolet
4	Noah Gragson	Front Row Motorsports	Ford
5	Kyle Larson	Hendrick Motorsports	Chevrolet
6	Brad Keselowski	RFK Racing	Ford
7	Justin Haley	Spire Motorsports	Chevrolet
8	Kyle Busch	Richard Childress Racing	Chevrolet
9	Chase Elliott	Hendrick Motorsports	Chevrolet
10	Ty Dillon	Kaulig Racing	Chevrolet
11	Denny Hamlin	Joe Gibbs Racing	Toyota
12	Ryan Blaney	Team Penske	Ford
16	A. J. Allmendinger	Kaulig Racing	Chevrolet
17	Chris Buescher	RFK Racing	Ford
19	Chase Briscoe	Joe Gibbs Racing	Toyota
20	Christopher Bell	Joe Gibbs Racing	Toyota
21	Josh Berry	Wood Brothers Racing	Ford
22	Joey Logano	Team Penske	Ford
23	Bubba Wallace	23XI Racing	Toyota
24	William Byron	Hendrick Motorsports	Chevrolet
33	Austin Hill (i)	Richard Childress Racing	Chevrolet
34	Todd Gilliland	Front Row Motorsports	Ford
35	Riley Herbst (R)	23XI Racing	Toyota
38	Zane Smith	Front Row Motorsports	Ford
41	Cole Custer	Haas Factory Team	Ford
42	John Hunter Nemechek	Legacy Motor Club	Toyota
43	Erik Jones	Legacy Motor Club	Toyota
44	Joey Gase (i)	NY Racing Team	Chevrolet
45	Tyler Reddick	23XI Racing	Toyota
47	Ricky Stenhouse Jr.	Hyak Motorsports	Chevrolet
48	Alex Bowman	Hendrick Motorsports	Chevrolet
51	Cody Ware	Rick Ware Racing	Ford
54	Ty Gibbs	Joe Gibbs Racing	Toyota
60	Ryan Preece	RFK Racing	Ford
66	Casey Mears	Garage 66	Ford
71	Michael McDowell	Spire Motorsports	Chevrolet
77	Carson Hocevar	Spire Motorsports	Chevrolet
78	B. J. McLeod (i)	Live Fast Motorsports	Chevrolet
88	Shane van Gisbergen (R)	Trackhouse Racing	Chevrolet
99	Daniel Suárez	Trackhouse Racing	Chevrolet
Official entry list

== Qualifying ==
Qualifying for the race was cancelled due to inclement weather. Ryan Blaney was awarded the pole for the race as a result of NASCAR's pandemic formula with a score of 3.600..

=== Starting lineup ===
Pos	No.	Driver	Team	Manufacturer
1	12	Ryan Blaney	Team Penske	Ford
2	48	Alex Bowman	Hendrick Motorsports	Chevrolet
3	5	Kyle Larson	Hendrick Motorsports	Chevrolet
4	22	Joey Logano	Team Penske	Ford
5	2	Austin Cindric	Team Penske	Ford
6	11	Denny Hamlin	Joe Gibbs Racing	Toyota
7	3	Austin Dillon	Richard Childress Racing	Chevrolet
8	24	William Byron	Hendrick Motorsports	Chevrolet
9	19	Chase Briscoe	Joe Gibbs Racing	Toyota
10	6	Brad Keselowski	RFK Racing	Ford
11	21	Josh Berry	Wood Brothers Racing	Ford
12	99	Daniel Suárez	Trackhouse Racing	Chevrolet
13	38	Zane Smith	Front Row Motorsports	Ford
14	8	Kyle Busch	Richard Childress Racing	Chevrolet
15	20	Christopher Bell	Joe Gibbs Racing	Toyota
16	77	Carson Hocevar	Spire Motorsports	Chevrolet
17	88	Shane van Gisbergen (R)	Trackhouse Racing	Chevrolet
18	54	Ty Gibbs	Joe Gibbs Racing	Toyota
19	1	Ross Chastain	Trackhouse Racing	Chevrolet
20	71	Michael McDowell	Spire Motorsports	Chevrolet
21	16	A. J. Allmendinger	Kaulig Racing	Chevrolet
22	23	Bubba Wallace	23XI Racing	Toyota
23	10	Ty Dillon	Kaulig Racing	Chevrolet
24	17	Chris Buescher	RFK Racing	Ford
25	47	Ricky Stenhouse Jr.	Hyak Motorsports	Chevrolet
26	43	Erik Jones	Legacy Motor Club	Toyota
27	45	Tyler Reddick	23XI Racing	Toyota
28	34	Todd Gilliland	Front Row Motorsports	Ford
29	41	Cole Custer	Haas Factory Team	Ford
30	9	Chase Elliott	Hendrick Motorsports	Chevrolet
31	60	Ryan Preece	RFK Racing	Ford
32	4	Noah Gragson	Front Row Motorsports	Ford
33	35	Riley Herbst (R)	23XI Racing	Toyota
34	42	John Hunter Nemechek	Legacy Motor Club	Toyota
35	51	Cody Ware	Rick Ware Racing	Ford
36	33	Austin Hill (i)	Richard Childress Racing	Chevrolet
37	7	Justin Haley	Spire Motorsports	Chevrolet
38	78	B. J. McLeod (i)	Live Fast Motorsports	Chevrolet
39	66	Casey Mears	Garage 66	Ford
40	44	Joey Gase (i)	NY Racing Team	Chevrolet
Official starting lineup

== Race ==
=== Race results ===
==== Stage results ====
Stage One Laps: 35

Pos	No	Driver	Team	Manufacturer	Points
1	5	Kyle Larson	Hendrick Motorsports	Chevrolet	10
2	1	Ross Chastain	Trackhouse Racing	Chevrolet	9
3	12	Ryan Blaney	Team Penske	Ford	8
4	71	Michael McDowell	Spire Motorsports	Chevrolet	7
5	7	Justin Haley	Spire Motorsports	Chevrolet	6
6	22	Joey Logano	Team Penske	Ford	5
7	34	Todd Gilliland	Front Row Motorsports	Ford	4
8	60	Ryan Preece	RFK Racing	Ford	3
9	19	Chase Briscoe	Joe Gibbs Racing	Toyota	2
10	20	Christopher Bell	Joe Gibbs Racing	Toyota	1
Official stage one results

Stage Two Laps: 60

Pos	No	Driver	Team	Manufacturer	Points
1	1	Ross Chastain	Trackhouse Racing	Chevrolet	10
2	20	Christopher Bell	Joe Gibbs Racing	Toyota	9
3	22	Joey Logano	Team Penske	Ford	8
4	42	John Hunter Nemechek	Legacy Motor Club	Toyota	7
5	24	William Byron	Hendrick Motorsports	Chevrolet	6
6	19	Chase Briscoe	Joe Gibbs Racing	Toyota	5
7	12	Ryan Blaney	Team Penske	Ford	4
8	60	Ryan Preece	RFK Racing	Ford	3
9	54	Ty Gibbs	Joe Gibbs Racing	Toyota	2
10	5	Kyle Larson	Hendrick Motorsports	Chevrolet	1
Official stage two results

=== Final Stage results ===
Stage Three Laps: 65

Pos	Grid	No	Driver	Team	Manufacturer	Laps	Points
1	1	12	Ryan Blaney	Team Penske	Ford	160	52
2	12	99	Daniel Suárez	Trackhouse Racing	Chevrolet	160	35
3	37	7	Justin Haley	Spire Motorsports	Chevrolet	160	40
4	29	41	Cole Custer	Haas Factory Team	Ford	160	33
5	26	43	Erik Jones	Legacy Motor Club	Toyota	160	32
6	3	5	Kyle Larson	Hendrick Motorsports	Chevrolet	160	41
7	24	17	Chris Buescher	RFK Racing	Ford	160	30
8	18	54	Ty Gibbs	Joe Gibbs Racing	Toyota	160	31
9	11	21	Josh Berry	Wood Brothers Racing	Ford	160	28
10	30	9	Chase Elliott	Hendrick Motorsports	Chevrolet	160	27
11	28	34	Todd Gilliland	Front Row Motorsports	Ford	160	30
12	20	71	Michael McDowell	Spire Motorsports	Chevrolet	160	32
13	15	20	Christopher Bell	Joe Gibbs Racing	Toyota	160	34
14	31	60	Ryan Preece	RFK Racing	Ford	160	29
15	19	1	Ross Chastain	Trackhouse Racing	Chevrolet	160	41
16	17	88	Shane van Gisbergen (R)	Trackhouse Racing	Chevrolet	160	21
17	34	42	John Hunter Nemechek	Legacy Motor Club	Toyota	160	27
18	10	6	Brad Keselowski	RFK Racing	Ford	160	19
19	8	24	William Byron	Hendrick Motorsports	Chevrolet	160	24
20	35	51	Cody Ware	Rick Ware Racing	Ford	160	17
21	27	45	Tyler Reddick	23XI Racing	Toyota	160	16
22	23	10	Ty Dillon	Kaulig Racing	Chevrolet	160	16
23	9	19	Chase Briscoe	Joe Gibbs Racing	Toyota	160	21
24	7	3	Austin Dillon	Richard Childress Racing	Chevrolet	160	13
25	6	11	Denny Hamlin	Joe Gibbs Racing	Toyota	160	12
26	21	16	A. J. Allmendinger	Kaulig Racing	Chevrolet	159	12
27	4	22	Joey Logano	Team Penske	Ford	159	23
28	40	44	Joey Gase (i)	NY Racing Team	Chevrolet	157	0
29	39	66	Casey Mears	Garage 66	Ford	156	8
30	36	33	Austin Hill (i)	Richard Childress Racing	Chevrolet	155	0
31	13	38	Zane Smith	Front Row Motorsports	Ford	154	6
32	38	78	B. J. McLeod (i)	Live Fast Motorsports	Chevrolet	137	0
33	14	8	Kyle Busch	Richard Childress Racing	Chevrolet	95	4
34	16	77	Carson Hocevar	Spire Motorsports	Chevrolet	81	3
35	25	47	Ricky Stenhouse Jr.	Hyak Motorsports	Chevrolet	28	2
36	2	48	Alex Bowman	Hendrick Motorsports	Chevrolet	27	1
37	22	23	Bubba Wallace	23XI Racing	Toyota	27	1
38	32	4	Noah Gragson	Front Row Motorsports	Ford	27	1
39	5	2	Austin Cindric	Team Penske	Ford	27	1
40	33	35	Riley Herbst (R)	23XI Racing	Toyota	27	1
Official race results

=== Race statistics ===
- Lead changes: 44 among 19 different drivers
- Cautions/Laps: 8 for 39 laps
- Red flags: 1 for 8 minutes and 30 seconds
- Time of race: 3 hours, 3 minutes, and 20 seconds
- Average speed: 130.909 miles per hour (210.678 km/h)

== Media ==
=== Television ===
NBC Sports covered the race on the television side. Leigh Diffey, 2000 Coke Zero 400 winner Jeff Burton and Steve Letarte called the race from the broadcast booth. Dave Burns, Kim Coon, Parker Kligerman, and Marty Snider handled the pit road duties from pit lane.

NBC
Booth announcers	Pit reporters
Lap-by-lap: Leigh Diffey; Color-commentator: Jeff Burton; Color-commentator: Steve Letarte	Dave Burns; Kim Coon; Parker Kligerman; Marty Snider

=== Radio ===
MRN had the radio call for the race, which was also simulcast on Sirius XM NASCAR Radio. Alex Hayden, Mike Bagley and 1989 NASCAR Cup Series Champion Rusty Wallace called the action for MRN when the field races thru the front straightaway. Dave Moody called the action for MRN from atop the Sunoco tower outside the exit of turn 2 when the field races thru turns 1 & 2. Kurt Becker worked the Daytona Backstretch for MRN from a spotter's stand in the inside of the track. Tim Catafalmo worked the action for MRN when the field races thru turns 3 & 4. Pit road was operated by lead pit reporter Steve Post, Chris Wilner, Jason Toy and PRN Radio's Wendy Venturini.

MRN
Booth announcers	Turn announcers	Pit reporters
Lead announcer: Alex Hayden; Announcer: Mike Bagley; Announcer: Rusty Wallace	Turns 1 & 2: Dave Moody; Backstretch: Kurt Becker; Turns 3 & 4: Tim Catafalmo	Steve Post; Chris Wilner; Jason Toy; Wendy Venturini

== Standings after the race ==
Drivers' Championship standings after Playoffs reset

	Pos	Driver	Points
3	1	Kyle Larson	2,032
1	2	William Byron	2,032 (–0)
	3	Denny Hamlin	2,029 (–3)
1	4	Ryan Blaney	2,026 (–6)
1	5	Christopher Bell	2,023 (–9)
19	6	Shane van Gisbergen	2,022 (–10)
5	7	Chase Elliott	2,013 (–19)
	8	Chase Briscoe	2,010 (–22)
1	9	Bubba Wallace	2,008 (–24)
5	10	Austin Cindric	2,008 (–24)
3	11	Ross Chastain	2,007 (–25)
	12	Joey Logano	2,007 (–25)
9	13	Josh Berry	2,006 (–26)
7	14	Tyler Reddick	2,006 (–26)
10	15	Austin Dillon	2,005 (–27)
7	16	Alex Bowman	2,002 (–30)
Official driver's standings

Manufacturers' Championship standings

Pos	Manufacturer	Points
1	Chevrolet	960
2	Toyota	920 (–39)
3	Ford	872 (–87)

- Note: Only the first 16 positions are included for the driver standings.

Previous race: 2025 Cook Out 400 (Richmond)	NASCAR Cup Series; 2025 season	Next race: 2025 Cook Out Southern 500
