= Chase Briscoe =

American racing driver (born 1994)

- Briscoe at Las Vegas Motor Speedway in 2026
- Born: Chase David Wayne Briscoe; December 15, 1994 (age 31); Mitchell, Indiana, U.S.
- Height: 6 ft 1 in (1.85 m)
- Achievements: 2024, 2025 Southern 500 Winner; 2025 Daytona 500 Pole-Winner; 2016 ARCA Racing Series Champion
- Awards: 2016 Bill France Four Crown; 2017 NASCAR Camping World Truck Series Rookie of the Year; 2017 NASCAR Camping World Truck Series Most Popular Driver; 2019 NASCAR Xfinity Series Rookie of the Year; 2021 NASCAR Cup Series Rookie of the Year

NASCAR Cup Series career
- 216 races run over 6 years
- Car no., team: No. 19 (Joe Gibbs Racing)
- 2026 position: 6th
- Best finish: 3rd (2025)
- First race: 2021 Daytona 500 (Daytona)
- Last race: 2026 Season Finale 400 (Homestead)
- First win: 2022 Ruoff Mortgage 500 (Phoenix)
- Last win: 2026 Bank of America 400 (Charlotte)
| Wins | Top tens | Poles |
|---|---|---|
| 8 | 67 | 11 |

NASCAR O'Reilly Auto Parts Series career
- 88 races run over 7 years
- 2026 position: 72nd
- Best finish: 4th (2020)
- First race: 2018 Rinnai 250 (Atlanta)
- Last race: 2026 The LiUNA! (Las Vegas)
- First win: 2018 Drive for the Cure 200 (Charlotte Roval)
- Last win: 2020 Kansas Lottery 300 (Kansas)
| Wins | Top tens | Poles |
|---|---|---|
| 11 | 55 | 2 |

NASCAR FedEx Freight Truck Series career
- 30 races run over 6 years
- 2026 position: 111th
- Best finish: 6th (2017)
- First race: 2017 NextEra Energy Resources 250 (Daytona)
- Last race: 2026 Tennessee Army National Guard 250 (Bristol)
- First win: 2017 Ford EcoBoost 200 (Homestead)
- Last win: 2018 Eldora Dirt Derby (Eldora)
| Wins | Top tens | Poles |
|---|---|---|
| 2 | 18 | 5 |

NASCAR Canada Series career
- 1 race run over 1 year
- 2024 position: 48th
- Best finish: 48th (2024)
- First race: 2024 Freshstone Dirt Classic (Ohsweken)
| Wins | Top tens | Poles |
|---|---|---|
| 0 | 1 | 1 |

ARCA Menards Series career
- 23 races run over 3 years
- Best finish: 1st (2016)
- First race: 2015 Sioux Chief PowerPEX 200 (IRP)
- Last race: 2021 Clean Harbors 100 at The Glen (Watkins Glen)
- First win: 2016 Herr's Potato Chips 200 (Winchester)
- Last win: 2016 Kansas 150 (Kansas)
| Wins | Top tens | Poles |
|---|---|---|
| 6 | 20 | 6 |

ARCA Menards Series West career
- 4 races run over 2 years
- Best finish: 31st (2013)
- First race: 2013 NAPA Auto Parts 150 (Albuquerque)
- Last race: 2021 General Tire 200 (Sonoma)
- First win: 2021 General Tire 200 (Sonoma)
| Wins | Top tens | Poles |
|---|---|---|
| 1 | 2 | 0 |
- Statistics up to date as of November 8, 2026.

Chase David Wayne Briscoe (born December 15, 1994) is an American professional stock car racing driver and team owner. He competes full-time in the NASCAR Cup Series, driving the No. 19 Toyota Camry XSE for Joe Gibbs Racing.

Briscoe won the 2016 ARCA Racing Series championship and is the 2024 and 2025 Southern 500 winner. He also owns a World of Outlaws sprint car racing team, Chase Briscoe Racing.

== Racing career ==
=== Early career ===
Briscoe's father, Kevin, initially did not allow Briscoe to race. He later relented, letting Chase race as a way of spending family time. Five years later, he returned to racing, driving 410 sprint cars at the age of thirteen. That year, he recorded seventeen top-ten finishes and a win at the final race of the season; he became the youngest driver to win a 410 sprint car race, beating NASCAR champion Jeff Gordon's record by one year despite racing with an engine from 1993.

In 2013, Briscoe applied for the Peak Stock Car Dream Challenge, a contest rewarding the winner with a ride at Michael Waltrip Racing. Despite winning the majority of on-track races, he finished second behind Patrick Staropoli in the challenge. Then-Michael Waltrip Racing executive Ty Norris told Briscoe after the fact that even though he did not win the challenge, Briscoe should still pursue a racing career. Later in the year, he made his NASCAR K&N Pro Series West debut at NAPA Speedway where he finished eighth. He ran two more races in the series that season, finishing thirteenth and 27th at Kern County Raceway Park and Phoenix International Raceway, respectively. Briscoe moved from Indiana to Charlotte, North Carolina in 2014 in hopes of making connections in the racing world.

=== 2015–2017 ===
In 2015, Briscoe was contacted by friend and driver Christopher Bell regarding a contract with Roush Fenway Racing, which resulted in a test session with ARCA Racing Series team Cunningham Motorsports. Team owner Kerry Scherer called Briscoe about the tests while Briscoe was driving back to Indiana from Charlotte, having given up on his racing career. After two tests at Mobile International Speedway and Fairgrounds Speedway, he made his ARCA debut at Lucas Oil Raceway at Indianapolis where he finished tenth. In his second ARCA start at Salem Speedway, he qualified seventh and later finished fifth. Briscoe struck up a personal friendship with Briggs Cunningham III near the end of the 2015 season and was offered a full-season ride for 2016, which Briscoe accepted. He won six races throughout the course of the season and won the 2016 championship by 535 points over runner-up Tom Hessert.

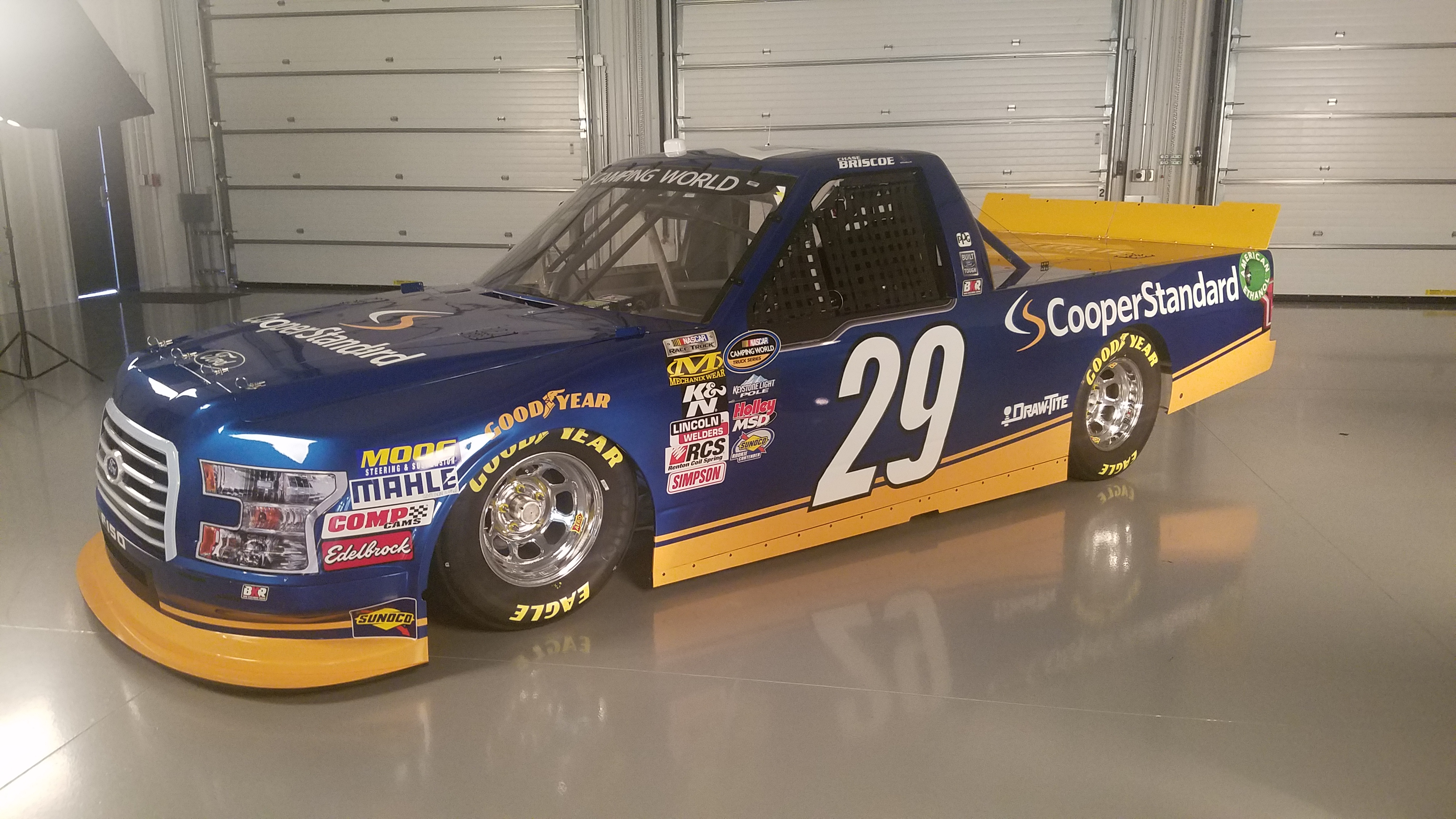
Briscoe's 2017 No. 29 Cooper Standard-sponsored Ford F-150 at Brad Keselowski Racing shop.

In 2017, Briscoe joined the newly formed Ford Performance NASCAR Driver Development Program and the Camping World Truck Series team Brad Keselowski Racing, driving the No. 29 Cooper Standard-sponsored Ford F-150 full-time. Briscoe finished third at Daytona in his Truck Series debut by avoiding a tremendous wreck on the final lap after running in the top-ten almost all day. Briscoe earned his first career Truck Series pole award at Dover International Speedway and finished twelfth in the event. Later in the season, Briscoe earned his first career win at Homestead-Miami Speedway. He was named the Truck Series' Most Popular Driver in 2017. BKR shut down after the season, leaving Briscoe without a ride. Before the 2017 season, Briscoe was offered a ride by Hendrick Motorsports but did not bring enough sponsorship to take advantage of the offer.

=== 2018–2020 ===
In 2018, Briscoe ran a part-time schedule in the NASCAR Xfinity Series. Briscoe ran races in both the No. 60 Ford of Roush Fenway Racing and the No. 98 Ford of Stewart–Haas Racing. Later that year, Briscoe won the inaugural Xfinity race on the Charlotte Roval race after holding off Justin Marks and Austin Cindric. Briscoe also returned to the Truck Series for one race in 2018, driving the No. 27 truck for ThorSport Racing in the race at Eldora Speedway, which he won in a photo finish over teammate Grant Enfinger. He would return to the same truck and team for the same race the following year and would finish seventh.

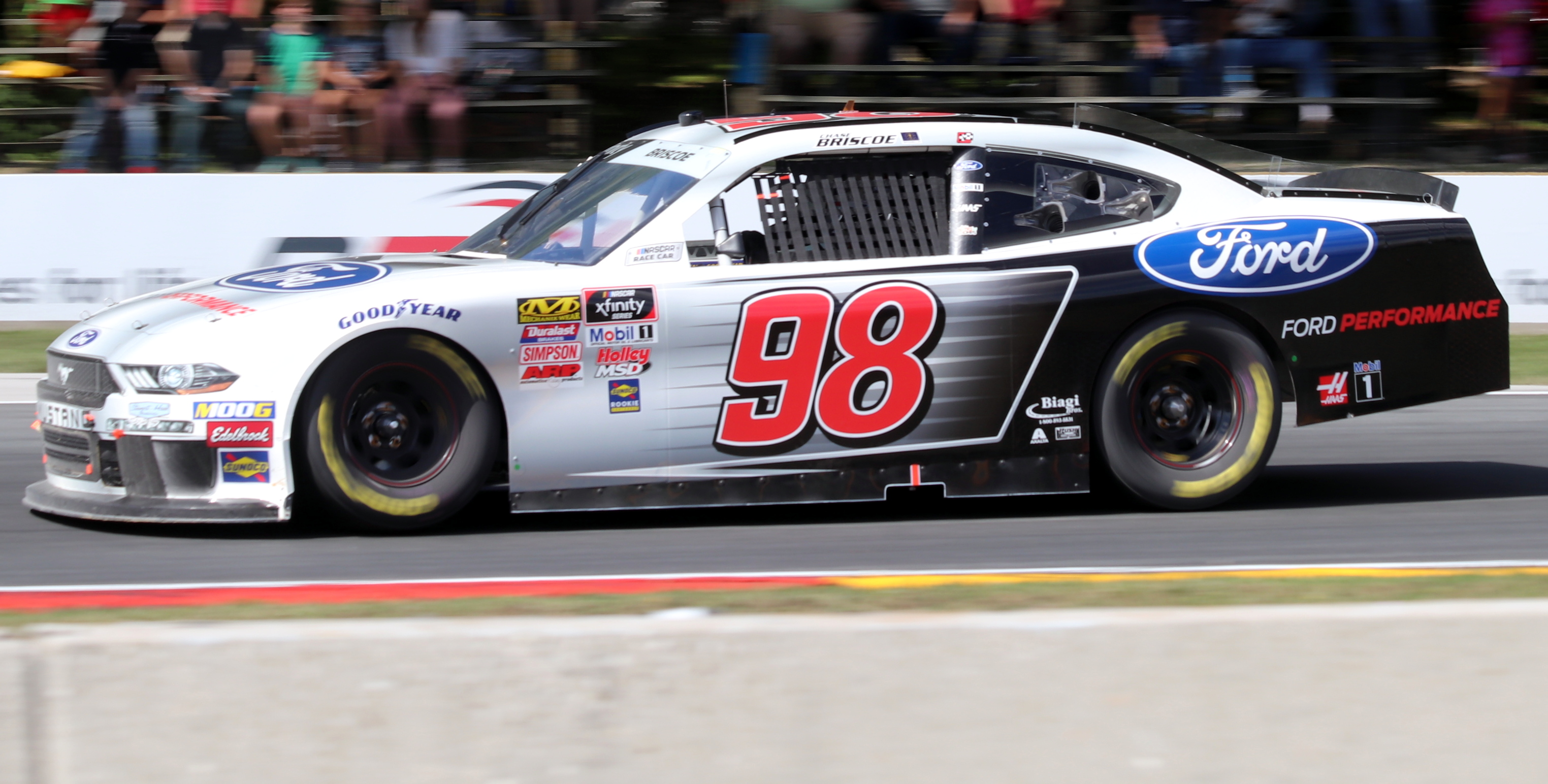
Briscoe's 2019 Xfinity car at Road America

Briscoe committed to a full-time Xfinity schedule in SHR's No. 98 in 2019. In July, Briscoe earned his second career Xfinity Series win at Iowa Speedway. He qualified for the 2019 NASCAR Xfinity Series Playoffs on the back of posting ten straight top-ten finishes. Briscoe finished the 2019 season fifth in points after finishing third at Homestead.

After sponsorship troubles threatened to take Briscoe out of the seat, he secured enough funding to run the 2020 NASCAR Xfinity Series season. Briscoe won the rain-delayed Boyd Gaming 300 at Las Vegas Motor Speedway; he led 27 of fifty laps before weather forced the remainder of the race to be postponed, followed by 62 laps on Sunday for a race-high 89 laps led en route to the victory. At Darlington, after his wife suffered a miscarriage, Briscoe earned his fourth career Xfinity Series win after holding off Kyle Busch. After winning at Darlington, instead of celebrating. He got out of his car and broke down. He recorded additional victories at Homestead, Pocono Raceway, Indianapolis Motor Speedway, Dover International Speedway, Bristol, Las Vegas in the fall, and Kansas; the Indianapolis win came in the inaugural race on the track's infield road course. In the final race at Phoenix, he fell behind the other three championship drivers due to a poor-handling car and spun with two laps remaining. Briscoe finished the race in ninth to conclude the season with a fourth-place points finish. His nine wins led all drivers in 2020, were the most by a Ford driver in the series, and the second highest by a non-Cup driver since Sam Ard in 1983.

=== 2021: Rookie season ===
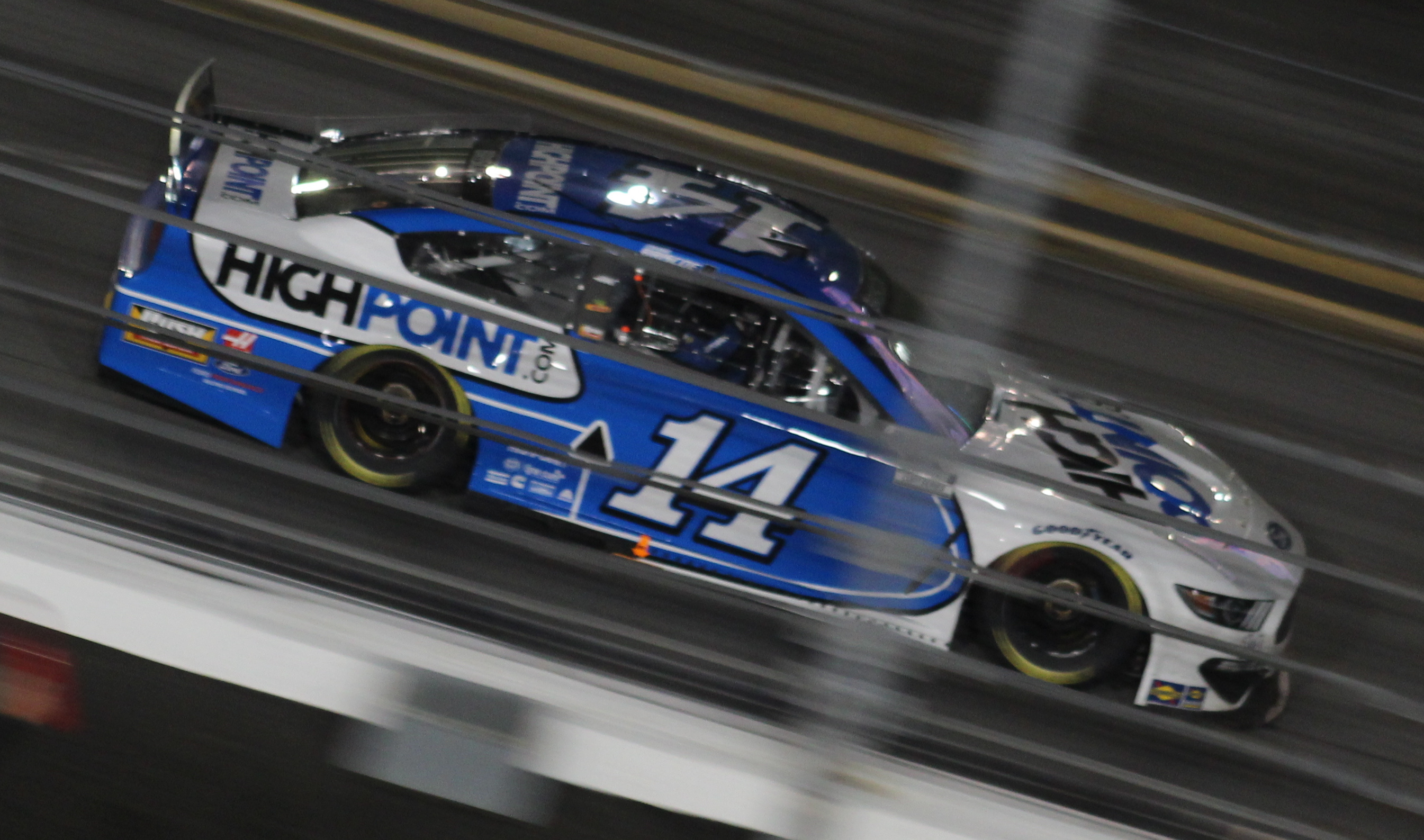
Briscoe in the No. 14 at Daytona International Speedway in 2021

On October 20, 2020, Stewart–Haas Racing announced that Briscoe would be promoted to the Cup Series in 2021, replacing Clint Bowyer in the No. 14 Ford Mustang. HighPoint.com, which sponsored Briscoe's Xfinity car, followed him to the Cup team, as well as Ford Performance Racing School. He recorded his first top ten at Circuit of the Americas as he finished sixth.

In March, Briscoe returned to the Truck Series to compete in the inaugural Bristol dirt race, where he drove the No. 04 for Roper Racing. He would return to the team for the races at Kansas and Knoxville. In May, Briscoe returned to the Xfinity Series and drove the No. 99 for B. J. McLeod Motorsports in a collaboration with Stewart–Haas Racing at Charlotte. In June, Briscoe returned to the West Series (now the ARCA Menards Series West) for the first time since 2013 when he drove in the race at Sonoma Raceway in preparation for his first Cup Series start at the track the next day. Briscoe's entry was for the same team (Stewart–Haas Racing) with the same car number (the No. 14) and crew chief (Johnny Klausmeier) as in the Cup Series. The car that Briscoe drove was a leftover Ford from Chad Bryant's closed team, and as part of the agreement to use the car, Bryant was the listed owner. He went on to lead every single lap in that race en route to the win. Briscoe then entered the main ARCA Series race at Watkins Glen. According to a pre-race TV interview with Briscoe, his No. 14 ARCA car was brought to Sonoma and Watkins Glen on the Cup Series No. 14 team's hauler instead of a Cup Series backup car. Briscoe would lead nine laps in the Watkins Glen race before exiting the race from the lead with a suspension issue and finishing 23rd.

Briscoe had a breakout race in the inaugural Verizon 200 at the Brickyard, leading most of the early stage and running in the top five. After the final restart, Briscoe was forced off the track by Denny Hamlin in turn one but rejoined side by side with Hamlin, earning a penalty due to failing to stop completely once out of track limits. Briscoe spun Hamlin out later that same lap, leading to controversy as Briscoe possibly did not know he was penalized. Briscoe finished 26th after being parked by NASCAR. He finished 23rd in the final standings and won Rookie of the Year honors.

=== 2022: First playoff appearance and win ===
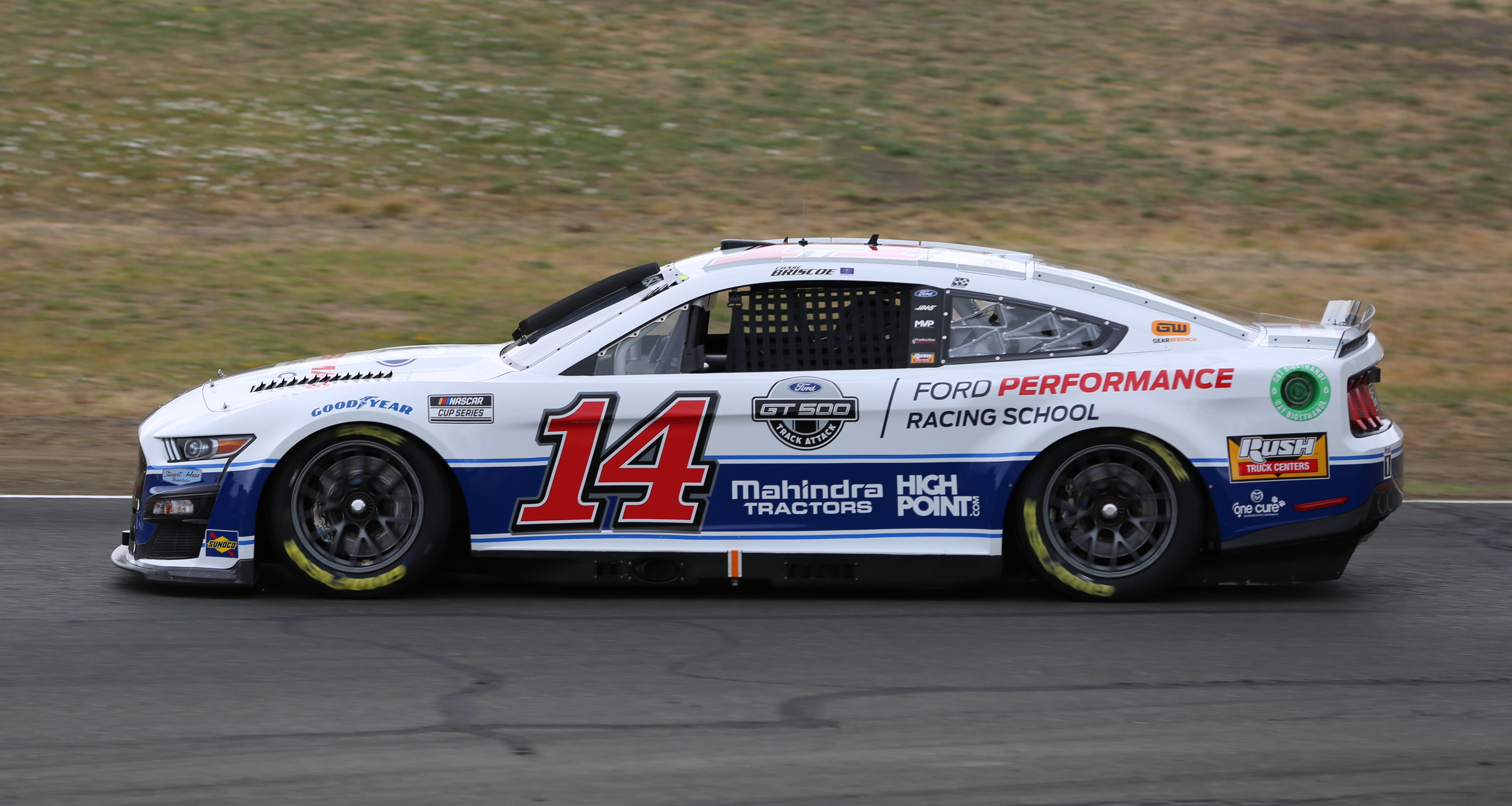
Briscoe's No. 14 car at Sonoma Raceway in 2022

Briscoe and the No. 14 Stewart–Haas Racing team earned a sponsorship from Mahindra Tractors for the majority of the season. Briscoe began the 2022 season with a 22nd-place finish at the 2022 Busch Light Clash at The Coliseum. He placed third at the 2022 Daytona 500, missing out on the win by 0.091 seconds to Bubba Wallace and winner Austin Cindric. Briscoe won his first Cup Series race at Phoenix on March 13. He led 101 out of 312 laps en route to his maiden victory, becoming the 200th different driver in series history to have won a race in the Cup Series. Briscoe was eliminated following the Round of 8 after finishing tenth at Martinsville. He finished the season at a career-best ninth in the points standings.

=== 2023 ===
Briscoe started the 2023 season with a 35th-place DNF at the 2023 Daytona 500. On May 31, following the 2023 Coca-Cola 600, NASCAR issued an L3 penalty on the No. 14 after a post-race inspection revealed a counterfeit engine panel NACA duct; as a result, the team was docked 125 owner and driver points and 25 playoff points, and crew chief Johnny Klausmeier was suspended for six races and fined US$250,000.

=== 2024: Final season at SHR and return to the playoffs ===
Briscoe started the 2024 season with a tenth-place finish at the 2024 Daytona 500. He broke a 73-race winless streak at the Southern 500 to make the playoffs.

On May 28, 2024, Stewart–Haas Racing announced it would shut down its NASCAR operations at the end of the season.

=== 2025: Joe Gibbs Racing, breakout season, and Championship 4 appearance ===
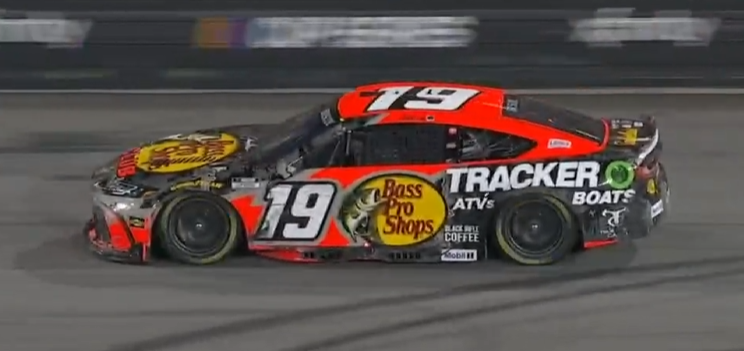
Briscoe in the No. 19 at Bowman Gray Stadium in 2025.

On June 25, 2024, it was officially announced that Briscoe would replace Martin Truex Jr. in the No. 19 Toyota in 2025.

Briscoe started the 2025 season with a fourth-place finish at the 2025 Daytona 500 after starting on the pole. After the Daytona 500, Briscoe's pole-winning car was taken to the NASCAR Research & Development Center for selected inspection, where it was found to have a modified single-source part, specifically, the spoiler. On February 19, NASCAR released its penalty report, in which Briscoe was penalized one hundred driver points and ten drivers' playoff points. JGR was fined US$100,000, deducted 100 owner points, as well as ten owners' playoff points. In addition, crew chief James Small was suspended for four races. On March 5, JGR successfully appealed the penalty. Briscoe subsequently regained his points earned from the fourth place at the Daytona 500, tying him with Carson Hocevar in fourteenth in the NASCAR championship with 72 points. Additionally, the money lost was regained, and Small's race suspension was lifted. Briscoe also won the pole for the 2025 Coca-Cola 600, becoming the first driver since William Byron in 2019 to win both the Daytona 500 and Coca-Cola 600 poles in the same season. After that pole, he won back-to-back poles at Nashville and Michigan. On June 22, Briscoe scored his first win with JGR at Pocono by holding off teammate Denny Hamlin, locking him in the playoffs. He also scored the pole for the Brickyard 400, becoming the first driver to start up front in three consecutive Crown Jewel events in the same year. During the playoffs, Briscoe scored wins at Darlington in the Round of 16 to advance to the Round of 12 and Talladega in the Round of 8 to make the Championship 4.

=== 2026: Appearance in "The Chase" and a return to Truck Series ===
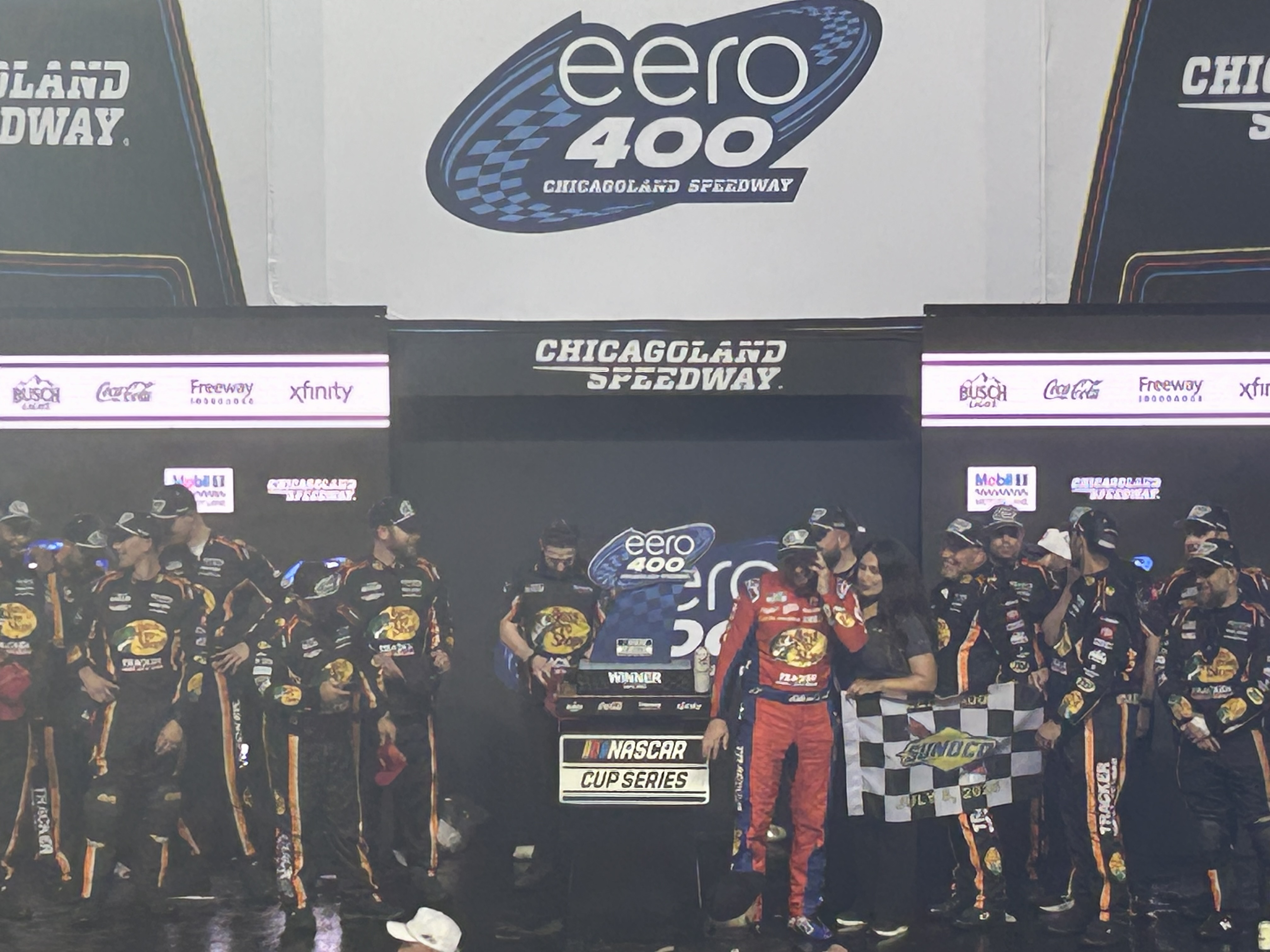
Briscoe celebrating his eero 400 win at Chicagoland Speedway.

Briscoe started the 2026 season with a 36th-place finish at the 2026 Daytona 500. He scored his first win of the season at Chicagoland. During "The Chase", by sweeping the stages and holding off Kyle Larson and Bubba Wallace in the final ten laps, he won at Las Vegas. He also won the following week at Charlotte.

In the O'Reilly Auto Parts Series, Briscoe drove the No. 19 for JGR at Las Vegas, filling in for Brent Crews, who was ineligible to run the race.

Briscoe returned to the Craftsman Truck Series, driving the No. 5 for Tricon Garage at Bristol, running in a Truck Series race for the first time since the 2023 Bristol Dirt race.

== Personal life ==
Briscoe's father, Kevin, and grandfather Richard are both involved in sprint car racing, Kevin being a former Truck Series driver and a five-time track champion at Tri-State Speedway and Bloomington Speedway, while Richard has worked as a car owner for drivers like Rich Vogler and Dave Blaney. He met and became friends with fellow driver Christopher Bell on iRacing.

Briscoe is an active user of Reddit and frequently interacts with fans on the NASCAR subreddit.

He is married to his wife, Marissa. They were expecting their first child in 2020, but Marissa suffered a miscarriage in May of that year. Almost a year later, on March 25, 2021, Marissa announced on Twitter that she was pregnant with a boy. On October 2, 2021, Marissa gave birth to their son. On October 8, 2024, Marissa gave birth to the couple's second and third children, boy/girl twins.

== Motorsports career results ==
=== Stock car career summary ===
| Season | Series | Team | Races | Wins | Top 5 | Top 10 | Points | Position |
|---|---|---|---|---|---|---|---|---|
| 2013 | NASCAR K&N Pro Series West | Bill McAnally Racing | 3 | 0 | 0 | 1 | 84 | 31st |
| 2015 | ARCA Racing Series | Cunningham Motorsports | 2 | 0 | 1 | 2 | 385 | 64th |
| 2016 | ARCA Racing Series | Cunningham Motorsports | 20 | 6 | 14 | 18 | 4795 | **1st** |
| 2017 | NASCAR Camping World Truck Series | Brad Keselowski Racing | 23 | 1 | 10 | 14 | 2248 | 6th |
| 2018 | NASCAR Camping World Truck Series | ThorSport Racing | 1 | 1 | 1 | 1 | 0 | NC† |
| 2018 | NASCAR Xfinity Series | Roush Fenway Racing | 12 | 0 | 0 | 3 | 334 | 24th |
| 2018 | NASCAR Xfinity Series | Stewart-Haas Racing with Biagi-DenBeste | 5 | 1 | 1 | 1 | 334 | 24th |
| 2019 | NASCAR Gander Outdoors Truck Series | ThorSport Racing | 1 | 0 | 0 | 1 | 0 | NC† |
| 2019 | NASCAR Xfinity Series | Stewart-Haas Racing with Biagi-DenBeste | 33 | 1 | 13 | 26 | 2302 | 5th |
| 2020 | NASCAR Xfinity Series | Stewart-Haas Racing | 33 | 9 | 16 | 22 | 4028 | 4th |
| 2021 | ARCA Menards Series West | Stewart-Haas Racing | 1 | 1 | 1 | 1 | 48 | 34th |
| 2021 | ARCA Menards Series | Stewart-Haas Racing | 1 | 0 | 0 | 0 | 22 | 109th |
| 2021 | NASCAR Cup Series | Stewart-Haas Racing | 36 | 0 | 0 | 3 | 655 | 23rd |
| 2021 | NASCAR Xfinity Series | B. J. McLeod Motorsports | 2 | 0 | 0 | 1 | 0 | NC† |
| 2021 | NASCAR Camping World Truck Series | Roper Racing | 3 | 0 | 1 | 1 | 0 | NC† |
| 2022 | NASCAR Xfinity Series | SS-Greenlight Racing | 1 | 0 | 1 | 1 | 0 | NC† |
| 2022 | NASCAR Cup Series | Stewart-Haas Racing | 36 | 1 | 6 | 10 | 2292 | 9th |
| 2023 | CARS Late Model Stock Car Tour | N/A | 1 | 0 | 0 | 1 | 23 | 49th |
| 2023 | SRX Series | N/A | 1 | 0 | 0 | 1 | 0 | NC† |
| 2023 | NASCAR Craftsman Truck Series | AM Racing | 1 | 0 | 0 | 1 | 0 | NC† |
| 2023 | NASCAR Cup Series | Stewart-Haas Racing | 36 | 0 | 4 | 8 | 534 | 30th |
| 2024 | NASCAR Canada Series | Dave Jacombs Racing | 1 | 0 | 1 | 1 | 40 | 48th |
| 2024 | NASCAR Cup Series | Stewart-Haas Racing | 36 | 1 | 3 | 9 | 2184 | 14th |
| 2025 | NASCAR Xfinity Series | Joe Gibbs Racing | 1 | 0 | 0 | 0 | 0 | NC† |
| 2025 | NASCAR Cup Series | Joe Gibbs Racing | 36 | 3 | 15 | 19 | 5019 | **3rd** |
| 2026 | NASCAR Craftsman Truck Series | TRICON Garage | 1 | 0 | 0 | 0 | 0 | NC† |
| 2026 | NASCAR O'Reilly Auto Parts Series | Joe Gibbs Racing | 1 | 0 | 1 | 1 | 0 | NC† |
| 2026 | NASCAR Cup Series | Joe Gibbs Racing | | | | | TBD | TBD |

^{†} As Briscoe was a guest driver, he was ineligible for championship points.

=== NASCAR ===
(key) (Bold – Pole position awarded by qualifying time. Italics – Pole position earned by points standings or practice time. * – Most laps led. ** – All laps led.)

==== Cup Series ====
NASCAR Cup Series results
| Year | Team | No. | Make | 1 | 2 | 3 | 4 | 5 | 6 | 7 | 8 | 9 | 10 | 11 | 12 | 13 | 14 | 15 | 16 | 17 | 18 | 19 | 20 | 21 | 22 | 23 | 24 | 25 | 26 | 27 | 28 | 29 | 30 | 31 | 32 | 33 | 34 | 35 | 36 | NCSC | Pts | Ref |
|---|---|---|---|---|---|---|---|---|---|---|---|---|---|---|---|---|---|---|---|---|---|---|---|---|---|---|---|---|---|---|---|---|---|---|---|---|---|---|---|---|---|---|
| 2021 | Stewart–Haas Racing | 14 | Ford | DAY; 19 | DRC; 32 | HOM; 18 | LVS; 21 | PHO; 22 | ATL; 23 | BRD; 20 | MAR; 27 | RCH; 22 | TAL; 11 | KAN; 20 | DAR; 11 | DOV; 35 | COA; 6 | CLT; 23 | SON; 17 | NSH; 31 | POC; 24 | POC; 21 | ROA; 6 | ATL; 15 | NHA; 27 | GLN; 9 | IRC; 26 | MCH; 11 | DAY; 21 | DAR; 19 | RCH; 16 | BRI; 13 | LVS; 14 | TAL; 14 | ROV; 22 | TEX; 15 | KAN; 19 | MAR; 22 | PHO; 34 | 23rd | 655 | |
| 2022 | Stewart–Haas Racing | 14 | Ford | DAY; 3 | CAL; 16 | LVS; 35 | PHO; 1 | ATL; 15 | COA; 30 | RCH; 11 | MAR; 9 | BRD; 22 | TAL; 37 | DOV; 13 | DAR; 20 | KAN; 24 | CLT; 4 | **GTW**; 24 | SON; 13 | NSH; 34 | ROA; 14 | ATL; 16 | NHA; 15 | POC; 15 | IRC; 23 | MCH; 20 | RCH; 23 | GLN; 25 | DAY; 31 | DAR; 27 | KAN; 13 | BRI; 14 | TEX; 5 | TAL; 10 | ROV; 9 | LVS; 4 | HOM; 36 | MAR; 9 | PHO; 4 | 9th | 2292 | |
| 2023 | Stewart–Haas Racing | 14 | Ford | DAY; 35 | CAL; 20 | LVS; 28 | PHO; 7 | ATL; 24 | COA; 15 | RCH; 12 | BRD; 5 | MAR; 5 | TAL; 4 | DOV; 30 | KAN; 32 | DAR; 17 | CLT; 20 | GTW; 34 | SON; 29 | NSH; 31 | CSC; 20 | ATL; 22 | NHA; 10 | POC; 29 | RCH; 11 | MCH; 31 | IRC; 6 | GLN; 35 | **DAY**; 30* | DAR; 15 | KAN; 19 | BRI; 27 | TEX; 10 | TAL; 13 | ROV; 28 | LVS; 33 | HOM; 17 | MAR; 4 | PHO; 24 | 30th | 534 | |
| 2024 | Stewart–Haas Racing | 14 | Ford | DAY; 10 | ATL; 31 | LVS; 21 | PHO; 9 | BRI; 13 | COA; 13 | RCH; 18 | MAR; 10 | TEX; 6 | TAL; 12 | DOV; 19 | KAN; 21 | DAR; 5 | CLT; 25 | GTW; 17 | SON; 34 | IOW; 28 | NHA; 2 | NSH; 21 | CSC; 32 | POC; 15 | IND; 24 | RCH; 21 | MCH; 31 | DAY; 14 | DAR; 1 | ATL; 38 | GLN; 6 | BRI; 8 | KAN; 24 | TAL; 30 | ROV; 36 | LVS; 26 | HOM; 12 | MAR; 15 | PHO; 29 | 14th | 2184 | |
| 2025 | Joe Gibbs Racing | 19 | Toyota | **DAY**; 4 | ATL; 21 | COA; 14 | PHO; 35 | LVS; 17 | HOM; 4 | MAR; 9 | DAR; 28 | BRI; 4 | TAL; 15 | TEX; 27 | KAN; 4 | **CLT**; 3 | **NSH**; 17 | **MCH**; 23 | MXC; 7 | POC; 1* | ATL; 35 | CSC; 23 | SON; 2 | DOV; 2 | **IND**; 18 | **IOW**; 2 | GLN; 5 | RCH; 13 | DAY; 23 | DAR; 1* | GTW; 2 | BRI; 9 | NHA; 10 | **KAN**; 4 | ROV; 14 | LVS; 4 | TAL; 1 | MAR; 37 | PHO; 18 | 3rd | 5019 | |
| 2026 | Joe Gibbs Racing | 19 | Toyota | DAY; 36 | ATL; 2 | COA; 37 | PHO; 37 | LVS; 8 | DAR; 12 | MAR; 14 | BRI; 5 | KAN; 3 | TAL; 29 | TEX; 23 | GLN; 4 | CLT; 33 | NSH; 3 | MCH; 10 | POC; 12 | COR; 17 | SON; 2 | CHI; 1 | ATL; 36 | NWS; 3 | IND; 4 | IOW; 6 | RCH; 2* | NHA; 26 | DAY; 13 | DAR; 6 | GTW; 32 | BRI; 27 | KAN; 4 | LVS; 1* | CLT; 1 | PHO; 8 | **TAL**; 33 | MAR; 14 | **HOM**; 39 | 6th | 2386 | |

===== Daytona 500 =====
| Year | Team | Manufacturer | Start | Finish |
|---|---|---|---|---|
| 2021 | Stewart–Haas Racing | Ford | 30 | 19 |
| 2022 | Stewart–Haas Racing | Ford | 9 | 3 |
| 2023 | Stewart–Haas Racing | Ford | 30 | 35 |
| 2024 | Stewart–Haas Racing | Ford | 20 | 10 |
| 2025 | Joe Gibbs Racing | Toyota | **1** | 4 |
| 2026 | Joe Gibbs Racing | Toyota | 2 | 36 |

==== O'Reilly Auto Parts Series ====
NASCAR O'Reilly Auto Parts Series results
| Year | Team | No. | Make | 1 | 2 | 3 | 4 | 5 | 6 | 7 | 8 | 9 | 10 | 11 | 12 | 13 | 14 | 15 | 16 | 17 | 18 | 19 | 20 | 21 | 22 | 23 | 24 | 25 | 26 | 27 | 28 | 29 | 30 | 31 | 32 | 33 | NOAPSC | Pts | Ref |
|---|---|---|---|---|---|---|---|---|---|---|---|---|---|---|---|---|---|---|---|---|---|---|---|---|---|---|---|---|---|---|---|---|---|---|---|---|---|---|---|
| 2018 | Roush Fenway Racing | 60 | Ford | DAY | ATL; 15 | LVS | PHO | CAL | TEX; 11 | | RCH; 26 | | | | POC; 38 | MCH | IOW | CHI; 9 | DAY | KEN | NHA | IOW; 10 | GLN | MOH; 14 | BRI; 34 | ROA | DAR | IND; 9 | LVS; 31 | RCH | | DOV; 19 | | | | HOM; 13 | 24th | 334 | |
| 2018 | Stewart–Haas Racing with Biagi–DenBeste | 98 | Ford | | | | | | | BRI; 23 | | TAL; 16 | DOV | CLT; 11 | | | | | | | | | | | | | | | | | ROV; 1* | | KAN; 30 | TEX | PHO | | 24th | 334 | |
| 2019 | Stewart–Haas Racing with Biagi–DenBeste | 98 | Ford | DAY; 12 | ATL; 15 | LVS; 8 | PHO; 6 | CAL; 5 | TEX; 4 | BRI; 4 | RCH; 8 | TAL; 4 | DOV; 5 | CLT; 19 | POC; 3 | MCH; 7 | IOW; 7 | CHI; 15 | DAY; 35 | KEN; 5 | NHA; 6 | IOW; 1 | GLN; 6 | MOH; 7 | BRI; 2 | ROA; 7 | DAR; 6 | IND; 8 | LVS; 11 | RCH; 5 | **ROV**; 9* | **DOV**; 5* | KAN; 3 | TEX; 22 | PHO; 8 | HOM; 3 | 5th | 2302 | |
| 2020 | Stewart–Haas Racing | 98 | Ford | DAY; 5 | LVS; 1* | CAL; 19 | PHO; 6 | DAR; 1 | CLT; 20 | BRI; 2 | ATL; 9 | HOM; 7 | HOM; 1 | TAL; 18 | POC; 1 | IRC; 1* | KEN; 4 | KEN; 2 | TEX; 2 | KAN; 14 | ROA; 3 | DRC; 29* | DOV; 10 | DOV; 1* | DAY; 3 | DAR; 11* | RCH; 11 | RCH; 16 | BRI; 1 | LVS; 1* | TAL; 19* | ROV; 18* | KAN; 1* | TEX; 24 | MAR; 7 | PHO; 9 | 4th | 4028 | |
| 2021 | B. J. McLeod Motorsports | 99 | Ford | DAY | DRC | HOM | LVS | PHO | ATL | MAR | TAL | DAR | DOV | COA | CLT; 6 | MOH | TEX | NSH | POC | ROA | ATL | NHA | GLN | IRC | MCH | DAY; 19 | DAR | RCH | BRI | LVS | TAL | ROV | TEX | KAN | MAR | PHO | 83rd | 0^{1} | |
| 2022 | SS-Green Light Racing | 07 | Ford | DAY | CAL | LVS | PHO | ATL | COA | RCH | MAR | TAL | DOV | DAR | TEX | CLT | PIR | NSH | ROA | ATL | NHA | POC | IRC; 5 | MCH | GLN | DAY | DAR | KAN | BRI | TEX | TAL | ROV | LVS | HOM | MAR | PHO | 84th | 0^{1} | |
| 2025 | Joe Gibbs Racing | 19 | Toyota | DAY | ATL | COA | PHO | LVS | HOM | MAR | DAR | BRI | CAR | TAL | TEX | CLT; 23 | NSH | MXC | POC | ATL | CSC | SON | DOV | IND | IOW | GLN | DAY | PIR | GTW | BRI | KAN | ROV | LVS | TAL | MAR | PHO | 97th | 0^{1} | |
| 2026 | Joe Gibbs Racing | 19 | Toyota | DAY | ATL | COA | PHO | LVS; 2 | DAR | MAR | CAR | BRI | KAN | TAL | TEX | GLN | DOV | CLT | NSH | POC | COR | SON | CHI | ATL | IND | IOW | DAY | DAR | GTW | BRI | LVS | CLT | PHO | TAL | MAR | HOM | 72nd | 0^{1} | |

==== Craftsman Truck Series ====
NASCAR Craftsman Truck Series results
| Year | Team | No. | Make | 1 | 2 | 3 | 4 | 5 | 6 | 7 | 8 | 9 | 10 | 11 | 12 | 13 | 14 | 15 | 16 | 17 | 18 | 19 | 20 | 21 | 22 | 23 | 24 | 25 | NCTC | Pts | Ref |
|---|---|---|---|---|---|---|---|---|---|---|---|---|---|---|---|---|---|---|---|---|---|---|---|---|---|---|---|---|---|---|---|
| 2017 | Brad Keselowski Racing | 29 | Ford | DAY; 3 | ATL; 25 | MAR; 11 | KAN; 5 | CLT; 11 | **DOV**; 12 | TEX; 2 | **GTW**; 2* | IOW; 7 | KEN; 11 | ELD; 3 | POC; 9 | MCH; 9 | BRI; 12 | MSP; 7 | CHI; 2 | NHA; 11 | LVS; 3 | TAL; 22 | **MAR**; 19 | TEX; 4 | PHO; 4 | **HOM**; 1* | | | 6th | 2248 | |
| 2018 | ThorSport Racing | 27 | Ford | DAY | ATL | LVS | MAR | DOV | KAN | CLT | TEX | IOW | GTW | CHI | KEN | ELD; 1* | POC | MCH | BRI | MSP | LVS | TAL | MAR | TEX | PHO | HOM | | | 91st | 0^{1} | |
| 2019 | ThorSport Racing | 27 | Ford | DAY | ATL | LVS | MAR | TEX | DOV | KAN | CLT | TEX | IOW | GTW | CHI | KEN | POC | **ELD**; 7* | MCH | BRI | MSP | LVS | TAL | MAR | PHO | HOM | | | 100th | 0^{1} | |
| 2021 | Roper Racing | 04 | Ford | DAY | DRC | LVS | ATL | BRD; 5 | RCH | KAN; 19 | DAR | COA | CLT | TEX | NSH | POC | KNX; 36 | GLN | GTW | DAR | BRI | LVS | TAL | MAR | PHO | | | | 98th | 0^{1} | |
| 2023 | AM Racing | 22 | Ford | DAY | LVS | ATL | COA | TEX | BRD; 7 | MAR | KAN | DAR | NWS | CLT | GTW | NSH | MOH | POC | RCH | IRP | MLW | KAN | BRI | TAL | HOM | PHO | | | 95th | 0^{1} | |
| 2026 | Tricon Garage | 5 | Toyota | DAY | ATL | STP | DAR | CAR | BRI; 14 | TEX | GLN | DOV | CLT | NSH | MCH | COR | LRP | NWS | IRP | RCH | NHA | BRI | KAN | CLT | PHO | TAL | MAR | HOM | 111th | 0^{1} | |

^{*} Season still in progress
^{1} Ineligible for series points

==== Canada Series ====
NASCAR Canada Series results
| Year | Team | No. | Make | 1 | 2 | 3 | 4 | 5 | 6 | 7 | 8 | 9 | 10 | 11 | 12 | 13 | NPSC | Pts | Ref |
|---|---|---|---|---|---|---|---|---|---|---|---|---|---|---|---|---|---|---|---|
| 2024 | Dave Jacombs Racing | 1 | Ford | MSP | ACD | AVE | RIS | RIS | **OSK**; 5 | SAS | EIR | CTR | ICAR | MSP | DEL | AMS | 48th | 40 | |

=== ARCA Menards Series ===
(key) (Bold – Pole position awarded by qualifying time. Italics – Pole position earned by points standings or practice time. * – Most laps led.)

ARCA Menards Series results
| Year | Team | No. | Make | 1 | 2 | 3 | 4 | 5 | 6 | 7 | 8 | 9 | 10 | 11 | 12 | 13 | 14 | 15 | 16 | 17 | 18 | 19 | 20 | AMSC | Pts | Ref |
|---|---|---|---|---|---|---|---|---|---|---|---|---|---|---|---|---|---|---|---|---|---|---|---|---|---|---|
| 2015 | Cunningham Motorsports | 72 | Dodge | DAY | MOB | NSH | SLM | TAL | TOL | NJE | POC | MCH | CHI | WIN | IOW | IRP; 10 | POC | BLN | ISF | DSF | SLM; 5 | KEN | KAN | 64th | 385 | |
| 2016 | Cunningham Motorsports | 77 | Dodge | DAY; 4 | | | TAL; 3 | | NJE; 4 | | | | | | | | | | | | | | | 1st | 4795 | |
| 2016 | Cunningham Motorsports | 77 | Ford | | **NSH**; 9 | **SLM**; 16 | | **TOL**; 4* | | POC; 10 | MCH; 2 | **MAD**; 6 | **WIN**; 1* | IOW; 1* | IRP; 1* | POC; 1* | BLN; 2 | **ISF**; 5* | DSF; 4 | **SLM**; 6* | CHI; 1 | **KEN**; 22 | KAN; 1* | 1st | 4795 | |
| 2021 | Stewart–Haas Racing | 14 | Ford | DAY | PHO | TAL | KAN | TOL | CLT | MOH | POC | ELK | BLN | IOW | WIN | GLN; 23 | MCH | ISF | MLW | DSF | BRI | SLM | KAN | 109th | 22 | |

==== ARCA Menards Series West ====
ARCA Menards Series West results
| Year | Team | No. | Make | 1 | 2 | 3 | 4 | 5 | 6 | 7 | 8 | 9 | 10 | 11 | 12 | 13 | 14 | 15 | AMSWC | Pts | Ref |
|---|---|---|---|---|---|---|---|---|---|---|---|---|---|---|---|---|---|---|---|---|---|
| 2013 | Bill McAnally Racing | 20 | Toyota | PHO | S99 | BIR | IOW | L44 | SON | CNS | IOW | EVG | SPO | MMP | SMP; 8 | AAS | | | 31st | 84 | |
| 2013 | Bill McAnally Racing | 99 | Toyota | | | | | | | | | | | | | | KCR; 13 | PHO; 27 | 31st | 84 | |
| 2021 | Stewart–Haas Racing | 14 | Ford | PHO | SON; 1** | IRW | CNS | IRW | PIR | LVS | AAS | PHO | | | | | | | 34th | 48 | |

=== Superstar Racing Experience ===
(key) * – Most laps led. ^{1} – Heat 1 winner. ^{2} – Heat 2 winner.

Superstar Racing Experience results
| Year | No. | 1 | 2 | 3 | 4 | 5 | 6 | SRXC | Pts |
|---|---|---|---|---|---|---|---|---|---|
| 2023 | 57 | STA | STA II | MMS | BER | ELD; 7 | LOS | 17th | 0^{1} |

=== CARS Late Model Stock Car Tour ===
(key) (Bold – Pole position awarded by qualifying time. Italics – Pole position earned by points standings or practice time. * – Most laps led. ** – All laps led.)

CARS Late Model Stock Car Tour results
| Year | Team | No. | Make | 1 | 2 | 3 | 4 | 5 | 6 | 7 | 8 | 9 | 10 | 11 | 12 | 13 | 14 | 15 | 16 | CLMSCTC | Pts | Ref |
|---|---|---|---|---|---|---|---|---|---|---|---|---|---|---|---|---|---|---|---|---|---|---|
| 2023 | N/A | 5 | Ford | SNM | FLC | HCY | ACE | NWS; 10 | LGY | DOM | CRW | HCY | ACE | TCM | WKS | AAS | SBO | TCM | CRW | 49th | 23 | |

Achievements
| Preceded by Kyle Larson | Cook Out Southern 500 Winner; 2024—2025 | Succeeded by Incumbent |
