= 2024 Cook Out Southern 500 =

Race details
- Race 26 of 36 in the 2024 NASCAR Cup Series
- The commemorative logo for the event.
- Date: September 1, 2024
- Location: Darlington Raceway in Darlington, South Carolina
- Course: Permanent racing facility
- Course length: 1.366 miles (2.198 km)
- Distance: 367 laps, 501.322 mi (806.666 km)
- Average speed: 127.800 miles per hour (205.674 km/h)

Pole position
Driver	Bubba Wallace	23XI Racing
- Time: 29.421

Most laps led
Driver	Kyle Larson	Hendrick Motorsports
- Laps: 263

Winner
No. 14	Chase Briscoe	Stewart-Haas Racing

Television in the United States
- Network: USA
- Announcers: Leigh Diffey, Jeff Burton and Steve Letarte

Radio in the United States
- Radio: MRN
- Booth announcers: Alex Hayden, Jeff Striegle and Todd Gordon
- Turn announcers: Dave Moody (1–2) and Mike Bagley (3–4)

The 2024 Cook Out Southern 500, the 75th running of the event, was a NASCAR Cup Series race held on September 1, 2024, at Darlington Raceway in Darlington, South Carolina on the 1.366-mile (2.198 km) speedway, it was the 26th race of the 2024 NASCAR Cup Series season, last race of the regular season, and the final Crown Jewel of the year. Chase Briscoe won the race, his first win since the 2022 Ruoff Mortgage 500. Kyle Busch finished 2nd, and Christopher Bell finished 3rd. Kyle Larson and Ross Chastain rounded out the top five, and Chris Buescher, Denny Hamlin, Joey Logano, Corey LaJoie, and Tyler Reddick rounded out the top ten.

This was Stewart–Haas Racing's final win in the Cup Series before shutting down after the season.

== Report ==
=== Background ===
Darlington Raceway, where the race was held.

Darlington Raceway is a race track built for NASCAR racing located near Darlington, South Carolina. It is nicknamed "The Lady in Black" and "The Track Too Tough to Tame" by many NASCAR fans and drivers and advertised as "A NASCAR Tradition." It is of a unique, somewhat egg-shaped design, an oval with the ends of very different configurations, a condition which supposedly arose from the proximity of one end of the track to a minnow pond the owner refused to relocate. This situation makes it very challenging for the crews to set up their cars' handling in a way that is effective at both ends.

==== Entry list ====
- (R) denotes rookie driver.
- (i) denotes driver who is ineligible for series driver points.

No.	Driver	Team	Manufacturer
1	Ross Chastain	Trackhouse Racing	Chevrolet
2	Austin Cindric	Team Penske	Ford
3	Austin Dillon	Richard Childress Racing	Chevrolet
4	Josh Berry (R)	Stewart-Haas Racing	Ford
5	Kyle Larson	Hendrick Motorsports	Chevrolet
6	Brad Keselowski	RFK Racing	Ford
7	Corey LaJoie	Spire Motorsports	Chevrolet
8	Kyle Busch	Richard Childress Racing	Chevrolet
9	Chase Elliott	Hendrick Motorsports	Chevrolet
10	Noah Gragson	Stewart-Haas Racing	Ford
11	Denny Hamlin	Joe Gibbs Racing	Toyota
12	Ryan Blaney	Team Penske	Ford
14	Chase Briscoe	Stewart-Haas Racing	Ford
15	Kaz Grala (R)	Rick Ware Racing	Ford
16	Shane van Gisbergen (i)	Kaulig Racing	Chevrolet
17	Chris Buescher	RFK Racing	Ford
19	Martin Truex Jr.	Joe Gibbs Racing	Toyota
20	Christopher Bell	Joe Gibbs Racing	Toyota
21	Harrison Burton	Wood Brothers Racing	Ford
22	Joey Logano	Team Penske	Ford
23	Bubba Wallace	23XI Racing	Toyota
24	William Byron	Hendrick Motorsports	Chevrolet
31	Daniel Hemric	Kaulig Racing	Chevrolet
34	Michael McDowell	Front Row Motorsports	Ford
38	Todd Gilliland	Front Row Motorsports	Ford
41	Ryan Preece	Stewart-Haas Racing	Ford
42	John Hunter Nemechek	Legacy Motor Club	Toyota
43	Erik Jones	Legacy Motor Club	Toyota
45	Tyler Reddick	23XI Racing	Toyota
47	Ricky Stenhouse Jr.	JTG Daugherty Racing	Chevrolet
48	Alex Bowman	Hendrick Motorsports	Chevrolet
51	Justin Haley	Rick Ware Racing	Ford
54	Ty Gibbs	Joe Gibbs Racing	Toyota
66	Timmy Hill (i)	Power Source	Ford
71	Zane Smith (R)	Spire Motorsports	Chevrolet
77	Carson Hocevar (R)	Spire Motorsports	Chevrolet
99	Daniel Suárez	Trackhouse Racing	Chevrolet
Official entry list

== Practice ==
Erik Jones was the fastest in the practice session with a time of 29.542 seconds and a speed of 166.461 mph (267.893 km/h).

=== Practice results ===
Pos	No.	Driver	Team	Manufacturer	Time	Speed
1	43	Erik Jones	Legacy Motor Club	Toyota	29.542	166.461
2	11	Denny Hamlin	Joe Gibbs Racing	Toyota	29.598	166.146
3	47	Ricky Stenhouse Jr.	JTG Daugherty Racing	Chevrolet	29.603	166.118
Official practice results

== Qualifying ==
Bubba Wallace scored the pole for the race with a time 29.421 of and a speed of 167.146 mph (268.995 km/h). Rookie Carson Hocevar scored a personal and team best qualifying effort in 2nd.

=== Qualifying results ===
Pos	No.	Driver	Team	Manufacturer	R1	R2
1	23	Bubba Wallace	23XI Racing	Toyota	29.328	29.421
2	77	Carson Hocevar (R)	Spire Motorsports	Chevrolet	29.419	29.445
3	14	Chase Briscoe	Stewart-Haas Racing	Ford	29.294	29.576
4	5	Kyle Larson	Hendrick Motorsports	Chevrolet	29.445	29.444
5	19	Martin Truex Jr.	Joe Gibbs Racing	Toyota	29.292	29.582
6	45	Tyler Reddick	23XI Racing	Toyota	29.463	29.446
7	12	Ryan Blaney	Team Penske	Ford	29.375	29.617
8	24	William Byron	Hendrick Motorsports	Chevrolet	29.439	29.528
9	20	Christopher Bell	Joe Gibbs Racing	Toyota	29.239	29.670
10	17	Chris Buescher	RFK Racing	Ford	29.622	29.650
11	2	Austin Cindric	Team Penske	Ford	29.444	—
12	6	Brad Keselowski	RFK Racing	Ford	29.624	—
13	54	Ty Gibbs	Joe Gibbs Racing	Toyota	29.472	—
14	11	Denny Hamlin	Joe Gibbs Racing	Toyota	29.649	—
15	4	Josh Berry (R)	Stewart-Haas Racing	Ford	29.509	—
16	3	Austin Dillon	Richard Childress Racing	Chevrolet	29.670	—
17	8	Kyle Busch	Richard Childress Racing	Chevrolet	29.531	—
18	42	John Hunter Nemechek	Legacy Motor Club	Toyota	29.696	—
19	7	Corey LaJoie	Spire Motorsports	Chevrolet	29.534	—
20	9	Chase Elliott	Hendrick Motorsports	Chevrolet	29.791	—
21	51	Justin Haley	Rick Ware Racing	Ford	29.538	—
22	1	Ross Chastain	Trackhouse Racing	Chevrolet	29.806	—
23	22	Joey Logano	Team Penske	Ford	29.563	—
24	21	Harrison Burton	Wood Brothers Racing	Ford	29.849	—
25	31	Daniel Hemric	Kaulig Racing	Chevrolet	29.571	—
26	71	Zane Smith (R)	Spire Motorsports	Chevrolet	29.852	—
27	48	Alex Bowman	Hendrick Motorsports	Chevrolet	29.601	—
28	43	Erik Jones	Legacy Motor Club	Toyota	29.925	—
29	10	Noah Gragson	Stewart-Haas Racing	Ford	29.632	—
30	41	Ryan Preece	Stewart-Haas Racing	Ford	29.981	—
31	34	Michael McDowell	Front Row Motorsports	Ford	29.653	—
32	99	Daniel Suárez	Trackhouse Racing	Chevrolet	30.015	—
33	38	Todd Gilliland	Front Row Motorsports	Ford	29.853	—
34	16	Shane van Gisbergen (i)	Kaulig Racing	Chevrolet	30.267	—
35	15	Kaz Grala (R)	Rick Ware Racing	Ford	30.142	—
36	47	Ricky Stenhouse Jr.	JTG Daugherty Racing	Chevrolet	0.000	—
37	66	Timmy Hill (i)	Power Source	Ford	31.296	—
Official qualifying results

== Race ==
=== Race results ===
==== Stage results ====
Stage One Laps: 115

Pos	No	Driver	Team	Manufacturer	Points
1	5	Kyle Larson	Hendrick Motorsports	Chevrolet	10
2	23	Bubba Wallace	23XI Racing	Toyota	9
3	14	Chase Briscoe	Stewart-Haas Racing	Ford	8
4	45	Tyler Reddick	23XI Racing	Toyota	7
5	20	Christopher Bell	Joe Gibbs Racing	Toyota	6
6	11	Denny Hamlin	Joe Gibbs Racing	Toyota	5
7	54	Ty Gibbs	Joe Gibbs Racing	Toyota	4
8	24	William Byron	Hendrick Motorsports	Chevrolet	3
9	4	Josh Berry (R)	Stewart-Haas Racing	Ford	2
10	17	Chris Buescher	RFK Racing	Ford	1
Official stage one results

Stage Two Laps: 115

Pos	No	Driver	Team	Manufacturer	Points
1	5	Kyle Larson	Hendrick Motorsports	Chevrolet	10
2	14	Chase Briscoe	Stewart-Haas Racing	Chevrolet	9
3	11	Denny Hamlin	Joe Gibbs Racing	Toyota	8
4	24	William Byron	Hendrick Motorsports	Chevrolet	7
5	20	Christopher Bell	Joe Gibbs Racing	Toyota	6
6	54	Ty Gibbs	Joe Gibbs Racing	Toyota	5
7	4	Josh Berry (R)	Stewart-Haas Racing	Ford	4
8	45	Tyler Reddick	23XI Racing	Toyota	3
9	23	Bubba Wallace	23XI Racing	Toyota	2
10	6	Brad Keselowski	RFK Racing	Ford	1
Official stage two results

=== Final Stage results ===
Stage Three Laps: 137

Pos	Grid	No	Driver	Team	Manufacturer	Laps	Points
1	3	14	Chase Briscoe	Stewart-Haas Racing	Ford	367	57
2	17	8	Kyle Busch	Richard Childress Racing	Chevrolet	367	35
3	9	20	Christopher Bell	Joe Gibbs Racing	Toyota	367	46
4	4	5	Kyle Larson	Hendrick Motorsports	Chevrolet	367	53
5	22	1	Ross Chastain	Trackhouse Racing	Chevrolet	367	32
6	10	17	Chris Buescher	RFK Racing	Ford	367	32
7	14	11	Denny Hamlin	Joe Gibbs Racing	Toyota	367	43
8	23	22	Joey Logano	Team Penske	Ford	367	29
9	19	7	Corey LaJoie	Spire Motorsports	Chevrolet	367	28
10	6	45	Tyler Reddick	23XI Racing	Toyota	367	37
11	20	9	Chase Elliott	Hendrick Motorsports	Chevrolet	367	26
12	30	41	Ryan Preece	Stewart-Haas Racing	Ford	367	25
13	11	2	Austin Cindric	Team Penske	Ford	367	24
14	12	6	Brad Keselowski	RFK Racing	Ford	367	24
15	16	3	Austin Dillon	Richard Childress Racing	Chevrolet	367	22
16	1	23	Bubba Wallace	23XI Racing	Toyota	367	32
17	33	38	Todd Gilliland	Front Row Motorsports	Ford	367	20
18	32	99	Daniel Suárez	Trackhouse Racing	Chevrolet	366	19
19	27	48	Alex Bowman	Hendrick Motorsports	Chevrolet	366	18
20	13	54	Ty Gibbs	Joe Gibbs Racing	Toyota	366	26
21	24	21	Harrison Burton	Wood Brothers Racing	Ford	365	16
22	36	47	Ricky Stenhouse Jr.	JTG Daugherty Racing	Chevrolet	365	15
23	26	71	Zane Smith (R)	Spire Motorsports	Chevrolet	364	14
24	28	43	Erik Jones	Legacy Motor Club	Toyota	364	13
25	18	42	John Hunter Nemechek	Legacy Motor Club	Toyota	364	12
26	34	16	Shane van Gisbergen (i)	Kaulig Racing	Chevrolet	364	0
27	21	51	Justin Haley	Rick Ware Racing	Ford	363	10
28	31	34	Michael McDowell	Front Row Motorsports	Ford	363	9
29	25	31	Daniel Hemric	Kaulig Racing	Chevrolet	362	8
30	8	24	William Byron	Hendrick Motorsports	Chevrolet	344	17
31	15	4	Josh Berry (R)	Stewart-Haas Racing	Ford	343	12
32	29	10	Noah Gragson	Stewart-Haas Racing	Ford	343	5
33	2	77	Carson Hocevar (R)	Spire Motorsports	Chevrolet	335	4
34	35	15	Kaz Grala	Rick Ware Racing	Ford	332	3
35	37	66	Timmy Hill (i)	Power Source	Ford	278	0
36	5	19	Martin Truex Jr.	Joe Gibbs Racing	Toyota	2	1
37	7	12	Ryan Blaney	Team Penske	Ford	2	1
Official race results

=== Race statistics ===
- Lead changes: 26 among 11 different drivers
- Cautions/Laps: 7 for 39
- Red flags: 0
- Time of race: 3 hours, 55 minutes and 14 seconds
- Average speed: 127.800 miles per hour (205.674 km/h)

== Media ==
=== Television ===
USA covered the race on the television side. Leigh Diffey, two–time Darlington winner Jeff Burton and Steve Letarte called the race from the broadcast booth. Dave Burns, Kim Coon and Marty Snider handled the pit road duties from pit lane.

USA
Booth announcers	Pit reporters
Lap-by-lap: Leigh Diffey; Color-commentator: Jeff Burton; Color-commentator: Steve Letarte	Dave Burns; Kim Coon; Marty Snider

=== Radio ===
MRN had the radio call for the race, which was also simulcast on Sirius XM NASCAR Radio.

MRN Radio
Booth announcers	Turn announcers	Pit reporters
Lead announcer: Alex Hayden; Announcer: Jeff Striegle; Announcer: Todd Gordon	Turns 1 & 2: Dave Moody; Turns 3 & 4: Mike Bagley	Steve Post; Chris Wilner; Brienne Pedigo; Alex Weaver

== Standings after the race ==
Drivers' Championship standings after Playoffs reset

	Pos	Driver	Points
1	1	Kyle Larson	2,040
4	2	Christopher Bell	2,032 (–8)
2	3	Tyler Reddick	2,028 (–12)
1	4	William Byron	2,022 (–18)
1	5	Ryan Blaney	2,018 (–22)
2	6	Denny Hamlin	2,015 (–25)
4	7	Chase Elliott	2,014 (–26)
1	8	Brad Keselowski	2,008 (–32)
6	9	Joey Logano	2,007 (–33)
9	10	Austin Cindric	2,007 (–33)
6	11	Daniel Suárez	2,006 (–34)
	12	Alex Bowman	2,005 (–35)
5	13	Chase Briscoe	2,005 (–35)
20	14	Harrison Burton	2,005 (–35)
5	15	Ty Gibbs	2,004 (–36)
7	16	Martin Truex Jr.	2,004 (–36)
Official driver's standings

Manufacturers' Championship standings

Pos	Manufacturer	Points
1	Chevrolet	944
2	Toyota	929 (–15)
3	Ford	908 (–36)

- Note: Only the first 16 positions are included for the driver standings.

Previous race: 2024 Coke Zero Sugar 400	NASCAR Cup Series; 2024 season	Next race: 2024 Quaker State 400
