= 2024 Cook Out 400 =

2024 Cook Out 400 may refer to:

- 2024 Cook Out 400 (Martinsville), at Martinsville Speedway on April 7
- 2024 Cook Out 400 (Richmond), at Richmond Raceway on August 11

== See also ==
- 2024 Cook Out Southern 500, at Darlington Raceway on September 1
