= 2025 Cook Out 400 (Richmond) =

Race details
- Race 25 of 36 in the 2025 NASCAR Cup Series
- Date: August 16, 2025
- Location: Richmond Raceway in Richmond, Virginia
- Course: Permanent racing facility
- Course length: 0.75 miles (1.207 km)
- Distance: 400 laps, 300 mi (480 km)
- Average speed: 94.126 miles per hour (151.481 km/h)

Pole position
Driver	Ryan Preece	RFK Racing
- Time: 22.244

Most laps led
Driver	Bubba Wallace	23XI Racing
- Laps: 123

Fastest lap
Driver	Bubba Wallace	23XI Racing
- Time: 22.961

Winner
No. 3	Austin Dillon	Richard Childress Racing

Television in the United States
- Network: USA
- Announcers: Leigh Diffey, Jeff Burton and Steve Letarte
- Nielsen ratings: 0.75 (1.4 million)

Radio in the United States
- Radio: MRN
- Booth announcers: Alex Hayden, Mike Bagley, and Todd Gordon
- Turn announcers: Dave Moody (Backstretch)

The 2025 Cook Out 400 was a NASCAR Cup Series race that was held on August 16, 2025, at Richmond Raceway in Richmond, Virginia. Contested over 400 laps on the 0.75-mile (1.21 km) asphalt short track, it was the 25th race of the 2025 NASCAR Cup Series season.

Austin Dillon won the race. Alex Bowman finished 2nd, and Ryan Blaney finished 3rd. Joey Logano and Austin Cindric rounded out the top five, and Kyle Larson, Daniel Suárez, Josh Berry, Brad Keselowski, and Denny Hamlin rounded out the top ten.

== Report ==
=== Background ===
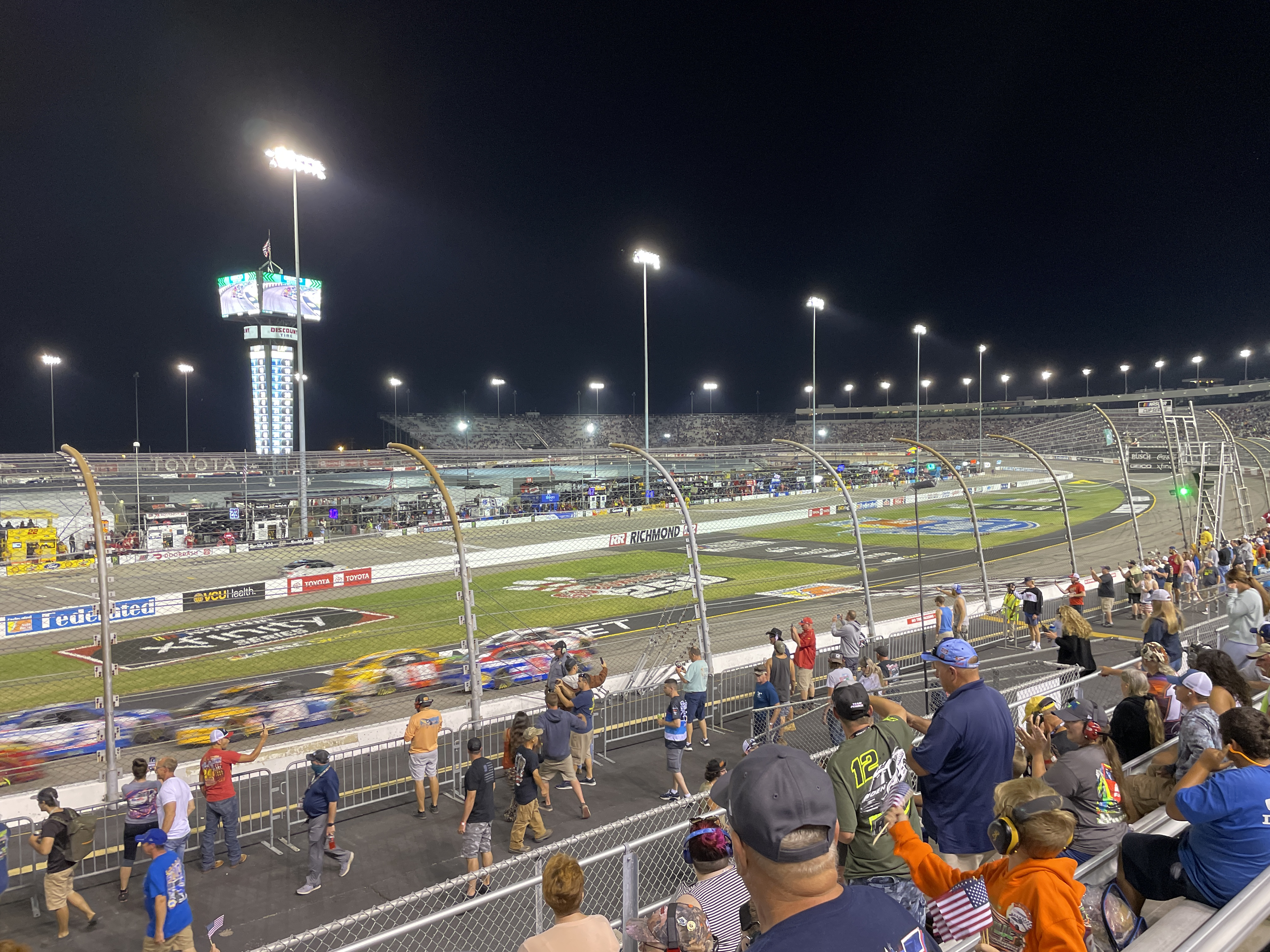
Richmond Raceway, the track where the race was held.

Richmond Raceway (RR) is a 0.75 miles (1.21 km), D-shaped, asphalt race track located just outside Richmond, Virginia in unincorporated Henrico County. It hosts the NASCAR Cup Series, NASCAR Xfinity Series and the NASCAR Craftsman Truck Series. Known as "America's premier short track", it has formerly hosted events such as the International Race of Champions, Denny Hamlin Short Track Showdown, and the USAC sprint car series. Due to Richmond Raceway's unique "D" shape which allows drivers to reach high speeds, Richmond has long been known as a short track that races like a superspeedway. With its multiple racing grooves, and proclivity for contact Richmond is a favorite among NASCAR drivers and fans.

==== Entry list ====
- (R) denotes rookie driver.
- (i) denotes driver who is ineligible for series driver points.

No.	Driver	Team	Manufacturer
1	Ross Chastain	Trackhouse Racing	Chevrolet
2	Austin Cindric	Team Penske	Ford
3	Austin Dillon	Richard Childress Racing	Chevrolet
4	Noah Gragson	Front Row Motorsports	Ford
5	Kyle Larson	Hendrick Motorsports	Chevrolet
6	Brad Keselowski	RFK Racing	Ford
7	Justin Haley	Spire Motorsports	Chevrolet
8	Kyle Busch	Richard Childress Racing	Chevrolet
9	Chase Elliott	Hendrick Motorsports	Chevrolet
10	Ty Dillon	Kaulig Racing	Chevrolet
11	Denny Hamlin	Joe Gibbs Racing	Toyota
12	Ryan Blaney	Team Penske	Ford
16	A. J. Allmendinger	Kaulig Racing	Chevrolet
17	Chris Buescher	RFK Racing	Ford
19	Chase Briscoe	Joe Gibbs Racing	Toyota
20	Christopher Bell	Joe Gibbs Racing	Toyota
21	Josh Berry	Wood Brothers Racing	Ford
22	Joey Logano	Team Penske	Ford
23	Bubba Wallace	23XI Racing	Toyota
24	William Byron	Hendrick Motorsports	Chevrolet
33	Jesse Love (i)	Richard Childress Racing	Chevrolet
34	Todd Gilliland	Front Row Motorsports	Ford
35	Riley Herbst (R)	23XI Racing	Toyota
38	Zane Smith	Front Row Motorsports	Ford
41	Cole Custer	Haas Factory Team	Ford
42	John Hunter Nemechek	Legacy Motor Club	Toyota
43	Erik Jones	Legacy Motor Club	Toyota
45	Tyler Reddick	23XI Racing	Toyota
47	Ricky Stenhouse Jr.	Hyak Motorsports	Chevrolet
48	Alex Bowman	Hendrick Motorsports	Chevrolet
51	Cody Ware	Rick Ware Racing	Ford
54	Ty Gibbs	Joe Gibbs Racing	Toyota
60	Ryan Preece	RFK Racing	Ford
67	Corey Heim (i)	23XI Racing	Toyota
71	Michael McDowell	Spire Motorsports	Chevrolet
77	Carson Hocevar	Spire Motorsports	Chevrolet
88	Shane van Gisbergen (R)	Trackhouse Racing	Chevrolet
99	Daniel Suárez	Trackhouse Racing	Chevrolet
Official entry list

== Practice ==
Kyle Busch was the fastest in the practice session with a time of 22.848 seconds and a speed of 118.172 mph (190.179 km/h).

=== Practice results ===
Pos	No.	Driver	Team	Manufacturer	Time	Speed
1	8	Kyle Busch	Richard Childress Racing	Chevrolet	22.848	118.172
2	42	John Hunter Nemechek	Legacy Motor Club	Toyota	22.860	118.110
3	11	Denny Hamlin	Joe Gibbs Racing	Toyota	22.899	117.909
Official practice results

== Qualifying ==
Ryan Preece scored the pole for the race with a time of 22.244 and a speed of 121.381 mph (195.344 km/h).

=== Qualifying results ===
Pos	No.	Driver	Team	Manufacturer	Time	Speed
1	60	Ryan Preece	RFK Racing	Ford	22.244	121.381
2	45	Tyler Reddick	23XI Racing	Toyota	22.331	120.908
3	16	A. J. Allmendinger	Kaulig Racing	Chevrolet	22.341	120.854
4	11	Denny Hamlin	Joe Gibbs Racing	Toyota	22.347	120.822
5	9	Chase Elliott	Hendrick Motorsports	Chevrolet	22.361	120.746
6	6	Brad Keselowski	RFK Racing	Ford	22.362	120.741
7	23	Bubba Wallace	23XI Racing	Toyota	22.379	120.649
8	20	Christopher Bell	Joe Gibbs Racing	Toyota	22.384	120.622
9	48	Alex Bowman	Hendrick Motorsports	Chevrolet	22.397	120.552
10	71	Michael McDowell	Spire Motorsports	Chevrolet	22.406	120.503
11	3	Austin Dillon	Richard Childress Racing	Chevrolet	22.426	120.396
12	17	Chris Buescher	RFK Racing	Ford	22.430	120.374
13	2	Austin Cindric	Team Penske	Ford	22.442	120.310
14	24	William Byron	Hendrick Motorsports	Chevrolet	22.461	120.208
15	77	Carson Hocevar	Spire Motorsports	Chevrolet	22.501	119.995
16	10	Ty Dillon	Kaulig Racing	Chevrolet	22.506	119.968
17	21	Josh Berry	Wood Brothers Racing	Ford	22.516	119.915
18	43	Erik Jones	Legacy Motor Club	Toyota	22.526	119.861
19	19	Chase Briscoe	Joe Gibbs Racing	Toyota	22.545	119.760
20	12	Ryan Blaney	Team Penske	Ford	22.548	119.745
21	99	Daniel Suárez	Trackhouse Racing	Chevrolet	22.549	119.739
22	4	Noah Gragson	Front Row Motorsports	Ford	22.549	119.739
23	54	Ty Gibbs	Joe Gibbs Racing	Toyota	22.553	119.718
24	41	Cole Custer	Haas Factory Team	Ford	22.577	119.591
25	7	Justin Haley	Spire Motorsports	Chevrolet	22.608	119.427
26	35	Riley Herbst (R)	23XI Racing	Toyota	22.608	119.427
27	88	Shane van Gisbergen (R)	Trackhouse Racing	Chevrolet	22.646	119.226
28	8	Kyle Busch	Richard Childress Racing	Chevrolet	22.679	119.053
29	38	Zane Smith	Front Row Motorsports	Ford	22.680	119.048
30	5	Kyle Larson	Hendrick Motorsports	Chevrolet	22.692	118.985
31	34	Todd Gilliland	Front Row Motorsports	Ford	22.725	118.812
32	67	Corey Heim (i)	23XI Racing	Toyota	22.747	118.697
33	1	Ross Chastain	Trackhouse Racing	Chevrolet	22.755	118.655
34	42	John Hunter Nemechek	Legacy Motor Club	Toyota	22.823	118.302
35	33	Jesse Love (i)	Richard Childress Racing	Chevrolet	22.831	118.260
36	47	Ricky Stenhouse Jr.	Hyak Motorsports	Chevrolet	22.842	118.203
37	51	Cody Ware	Rick Ware Racing	Ford	22.947	117.662
38	22	Joey Logano	Team Penske	Ford	0.000	0.000
Official qualifying results

== Race ==
=== Race results ===
==== Stage results ====
Stage One Laps: 70

Pos	No	Driver	Team	Manufacturer	Points
1	45	Tyler Reddick	23XI Racing	Toyota	10
2	23	Bubba Wallace	23XI Racing	Toyota	9
3	11	Denny Hamlin	Joe Gibbs Racing	Toyota	8
4	3	Austin Dillon	Richard Childress Racing	Chevrolet	7
5	2	Austin Cindric	Team Penske	Ford	6
6	20	Christopher Bell	Joe Gibbs Racing	Toyota	5
7	12	Ryan Blaney	Team Penske	Ford	4
8	6	Brad Keselowski	RFK Racing	Ford	3
9	21	Josh Berry	Wood Brothers Racing	Ford	2
10	99	Daniel Suárez	Trackhouse Racing	Chevrolet	1
Official stage one results

Stage Two Laps: 160

Pos	No	Driver	Team	Manufacturer	Points
1	23	Bubba Wallace	23XI Racing	Toyota	10
2	99	Daniel Suárez	Trackhouse Racing	Chevrolet	9
3	12	Ryan Blaney	Team Penske	Ford	8
4	3	Austin Dillon	Richard Childress Racing	Chevrolet	7
5	48	Alex Bowman	Hendrick Motorsports	Chevrolet	6
6	60	Ryan Preece	RFK Racing	Ford	5
7	77	Carson Hocevar	Spire Motorsports	Chevrolet	4
8	2	Austin Cindric	Team Penske	Ford	3
9	24	William Byron	Hendrick Motorsports	Chevrolet	2
10	5	Kyle Larson	Hendrick Motorsports	Chevrolet	1
Official stage two results

=== Final Stage results ===
Stage Three Laps: 170

Pos	Grid	No	Driver	Team	Manufacturer	Laps	Points
1	11	3	Austin Dillon	Richard Childress Racing	Chevrolet	400	54
2	9	48	Alex Bowman	Hendrick Motorsports	Chevrolet	400	41
3	20	12	Ryan Blaney	Team Penske	Ford	400	46
4	38	22	Joey Logano	Team Penske	Ford	400	33
5	13	2	Austin Cindric	Team Penske	Ford	400	41
6	30	5	Kyle Larson	Hendrick Motorsports	Chevrolet	400	32
7	21	99	Daniel Suárez	Trackhouse Racing	Chevrolet	400	40
8	17	21	Josh Berry	Wood Brothers Racing	Ford	400	31
9	6	6	Brad Keselowski	RFK Racing	Ford	400	31
10	4	11	Denny Hamlin	Joe Gibbs Racing	Toyota	400	35
11	29	38	Zane Smith	Front Row Motorsports	Ford	400	26
12	14	24	William Byron	Hendrick Motorsports	Chevrolet	400	27
13	19	19	Chase Briscoe	Joe Gibbs Racing	Toyota	399	24
14	27	88	Shane van Gisbergen (R)	Trackhouse Racing	Chevrolet	399	23
15	15	77	Carson Hocevar	Spire Motorsports	Chevrolet	399	26
16	28	8	Kyle Busch	Richard Childress Racing	Chevrolet	399	21
17	10	71	Michael McDowell	Spire Motorsports	Chevrolet	399	20
18	23	54	Ty Gibbs	Joe Gibbs Racing	Toyota	399	19
19	33	1	Ross Chastain	Trackhouse Racing	Chevrolet	399	18
20	16	10	Ty Dillon	Kaulig Racing	Chevrolet	399	17
21	8	20	Christopher Bell	Joe Gibbs Racing	Toyota	399	21
22	3	16	A. J. Allmendinger	Kaulig Racing	Chevrolet	399	15
23	36	47	Ricky Stenhouse Jr.	Hyak Motorsports	Chevrolet	399	14
24	24	41	Cole Custer	Haas Factory Team	Ford	399	13
25	31	34	Todd Gilliland	Front Row Motorsports	Ford	399	12
26	18	43	Erik Jones	Legacy Motor Club	Toyota	398	11
27	22	4	Noah Gragson	Front Row Motorsports	Ford	398	10
28	7	23	Bubba Wallace	23XI Racing	Toyota	398	29
29	32	67	Corey Heim (i)	23XI Racing	Toyota	398	0
30	12	17	Chris Buescher	RFK Racing	Ford	398	7
31	26	35	Riley Herbst (R)	23XI Racing	Toyota	398	6
32	37	51	Cody Ware	Rick Ware Racing	Ford	397	5
33	35	33	Jesse Love (i)	Richard Childress Racing	Chevrolet	396	0
34	2	45	Tyler Reddick	23XI Racing	Toyota	396	13
35	1	60	Ryan Preece	RFK Racing	Ford	396	2
36	34	42	John Hunter Nemechek	Legacy Motor Club	Toyota	389	1
37	25	7	Justin Haley	Spire Motorsports	Chevrolet	197	1
38	5	9	Chase Elliott	Hendrick Motorsports	Chevrolet	196	1
Official race results

=== Race statistics ===
- Lead changes: 24 among 11 different drivers
- Cautions/Laps: 5 for 44
- Red flags: 0
- Time of race: 3 hours, 11 minutes, and 14 seconds
- Average speed: 94.126 miles per hour (151.481 km/h)

== Media ==
=== Television ===
USA covered the race on the television side. Leigh Diffey, Jeff Burton, and Steve Letarte called the race from the broadcast booth. Dave Burns, Kim Coon, and Marty Snider handled the pit road duties from pit lane.

USA
Booth announcers	Pit reporters
Lap-by-lap: Leigh Diffey; Color-commentator: Jeff Burton; Color-commentator: Steve Letarte	Dave Burns; Kim Coon; Marty Snider

=== Radio ===
The Motor Racing Network had the radio call for the race, which was also simulcast on Sirius XM NASCAR Radio. Alex Hayden, Mike Bagley and Todd Gordon called the race from the broadcast booth for MRN when the field races through the front straightaway. Dave Moody called the race from a platform when the field races down the backstraightaway. MRN Lead Pit Reporter Steve Post, Jacklyn Drake and Chris Wilner called the action for MRN from pit lane.

MRN Radio
Booth announcers	Turn announcers	Pit reporters
Lead announcer: Alex Hayden; Announcer: Mike Bagley; Announcer: Todd Gordon	Backstretch: Dave Moody	Steve Post; Jacklyn Drake; Chris Wilner

== Standings after the race ==
Drivers' Championship standings

	Pos	Driver	Points
	1	William Byron	839
	2	Chase Elliott	771 (–68)
	3	Denny Hamlin	766 (–73)
1	4	Kyle Larson	759 (–80)
1	5	Ryan Blaney	756 (–83)
2	6	Christopher Bell	748 (–91)
	7	Tyler Reddick	714 (–125)
	8	Chase Briscoe	698 (–141)
	9	Alex Bowman	685 (–154)
1	10	Bubba Wallace	639 (–200)
1	11	Chris Buescher	625 (–214)
1	12	Joey Logano	616 (–223)
1	13	Ryan Preece	591 (–248)
	14	Ross Chastain	589 (–250)
1	15	Austin Cindric	543 (–296)
1	16	Kyle Busch	537 (–302)
Official driver's standings

Manufacturers' Championship standings

Pos	Manufacturer	Points
1	Chevrolet	925
2	Toyota	888 (–37)
3	Ford	832 (–93)

- Note: Only the first 16 positions are included for the driver standings.
- . – Driver has clinched a position in the NASCAR Cup Series playoffs.

Previous race: 2025 Go Bowling at The Glen	NASCAR Cup Series; 2025 season	Next race: 2025 Coke Zero Sugar 400
