= 2025 Cook Out Southern 500 =

Race details
- Race 27 of 36 in the 2025 NASCAR Cup Series
- Date: August 31, 2025
- Location: Darlington Raceway in Darlington, South Carolina
- Course: Permanent racing facility
- Course length: 1.366 miles (2.198 km)
- Distance: 367 laps, 501.322 mi (806.666 km)
- Average speed: 130.148 miles per hour (209.453 km/h)

Pole position
Driver	Denny Hamlin	Joe Gibbs Racing
- Time: 28.694

Most laps led
Driver	Chase Briscoe	Joe Gibbs Racing
- Laps: 309

Fastest lap
Driver	Josh Berry	Wood Brothers Racing
- Time: 29.039

Winner
No. 19	Chase Briscoe	Joe Gibbs Racing

Television in the United States
- Network: USA
- Announcers: Leigh Diffey, Jeff Burton and Steve Letarte
- Nielsen ratings: 1.88 million

Radio in the United States
- Radio: MRN
- Booth announcers: Alex Hayden, Mike Bagley and Todd Gordon
- Turn announcers: Dave Moody (1–2) and Kurt Becker (3–4)

The 2025 Cook Out Southern 500, the 76th running of the event, was a NASCAR Cup Series race held on August 31, 2025, at Darlington Raceway in Darlington, South Carolina on the 1.366-mile (2.198 km) speedway, it was the 27th race of the 2025 NASCAR Cup Series season, first race of the playoffs, and the final Crown Jewel of the year.

Chase Briscoe won the race. Tyler Reddick finished 2nd, and Erik Jones finished 3rd. John Hunter Nemechek and A. J. Allmendinger rounded out the top five, and Bubba Wallace, Denny Hamlin, Kyle Busch, Carson Hocevar, and Chris Buescher rounded out the top ten.

== Report ==
=== Background ===
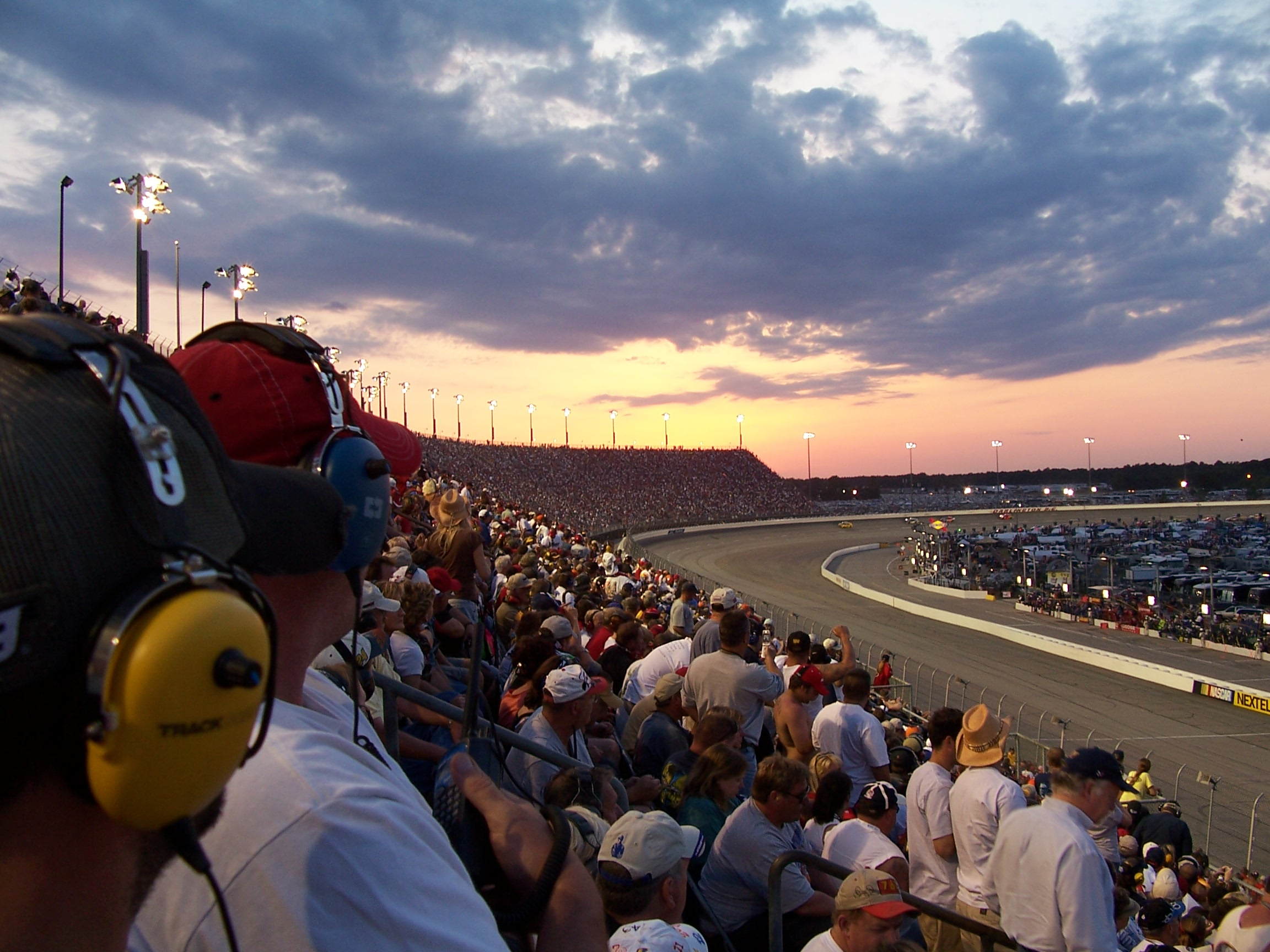
Darlington Raceway, where the race was held.

Darlington Raceway is a race track built for NASCAR racing located near Darlington, South Carolina. It is nicknamed "The Lady in Black" and "The Track Too Tough to Tame" by many NASCAR fans and drivers and advertised as "A NASCAR Tradition." It is of a unique, somewhat egg-shaped design, an oval with the ends of very different configurations, a condition which supposedly arose from the proximity of one end of the track to a minnow pond the owner refused to relocate. This situation makes it very challenging for the crews to set up their cars' handling in a way that is effective at both ends.

==== Entry list ====
- (R) denotes rookie driver.
- (P) denotes playoff driver.
- (i) denotes driver who is ineligible for series driver points.

No.	Driver	Team	Manufacturer
1	Ross Chastain (P)	Trackhouse Racing	Chevrolet
2	Austin Cindric (P)	Team Penske	Ford
3	Austin Dillon (P)	Richard Childress Racing	Chevrolet
4	Noah Gragson	Front Row Motorsports	Ford
5	Kyle Larson (P)	Hendrick Motorsports	Chevrolet
6	Brad Keselowski	RFK Racing	Ford
7	Justin Haley	Spire Motorsports	Chevrolet
8	Kyle Busch	Richard Childress Racing	Chevrolet
9	Chase Elliott (P)	Hendrick Motorsports	Chevrolet
10	Ty Dillon	Kaulig Racing	Chevrolet
11	Denny Hamlin (P)	Joe Gibbs Racing	Toyota
12	Ryan Blaney (P)	Team Penske	Ford
16	A. J. Allmendinger	Kaulig Racing	Chevrolet
17	Chris Buescher	RFK Racing	Ford
19	Chase Briscoe (P)	Joe Gibbs Racing	Toyota
20	Christopher Bell (P)	Joe Gibbs Racing	Toyota
21	Josh Berry (P)	Wood Brothers Racing	Ford
22	Joey Logano (P)	Team Penske	Ford
23	Bubba Wallace (P)	23XI Racing	Toyota
24	William Byron (P)	Hendrick Motorsports	Chevrolet
34	Todd Gilliland	Front Row Motorsports	Ford
35	Riley Herbst (R)	23XI Racing	Toyota
38	Zane Smith	Front Row Motorsports	Ford
41	Cole Custer	Haas Factory Team	Ford
42	John Hunter Nemechek	Legacy Motor Club	Toyota
43	Erik Jones	Legacy Motor Club	Toyota
44	Derek Kraus	NY Racing Team	Chevrolet
45	Tyler Reddick (P)	23XI Racing	Toyota
47	Ricky Stenhouse Jr.	Hyak Motorsports	Chevrolet
48	Alex Bowman (P)	Hendrick Motorsports	Chevrolet
51	Cody Ware	Rick Ware Racing	Ford
54	Ty Gibbs	Joe Gibbs Racing	Toyota
60	Ryan Preece	RFK Racing	Ford
66	Timmy Hill (i)	Garage 66	Ford
71	Michael McDowell	Spire Motorsports	Chevrolet
77	Carson Hocevar	Spire Motorsports	Chevrolet
88	Shane van Gisbergen (P) (R)	Trackhouse Racing	Chevrolet
99	Daniel Suárez	Trackhouse Racing	Chevrolet
Official entry list

== Practice ==
Michael McDowell was the fastest in the practice session with a time of 29.007 seconds and a speed of 169.531 mph (272.834 km/h).

=== Practice results ===
Pos	No.	Driver	Team	Manufacturer	Time	Speed
1	71	Michael McDowell	Spire Motorsports	Chevrolet	29.007	169.531
2	7	Justin Haley	Spire Motorsports	Chevrolet	29.123	168.856
3	54	Ty Gibbs	Joe Gibbs Racing	Toyota	29.124	168.850
Official practice results

== Qualifying ==
Denny Hamlin scored the pole for the race with a time of 28.694 and a speed of 171.381 mph (275.811 km/h).

=== Qualifying results ===
Pos	No.	Driver	Team	Manufacturer	Time	Speed
1	11	Denny Hamlin (P)	Joe Gibbs Racing	Toyota	28.694	171.381
2	19	Chase Briscoe (P)	Joe Gibbs Racing	Toyota	28.715	171.255
3	21	Josh Berry (P)	Wood Brothers Racing	Ford	28.829	170.578
4	45	Tyler Reddick (P)	23XI Racing	Toyota	28.848	170.466
5	5	Kyle Larson (P)	Hendrick Motorsports	Chevrolet	28.925	170.012
6	1	Ross Chastain (P)	Trackhouse Racing	Chevrolet	28.933	169.965
7	20	Christopher Bell (P)	Joe Gibbs Racing	Toyota	28.962	169.795
8	23	Bubba Wallace (P)	23XI Racing	Toyota	28.985	169.660
9	3	Austin Dillon (P)	Richard Childress Racing	Chevrolet	29.004	169.549
10	2	Austin Cindric (P)	Team Penske	Ford	29.023	169.438
11	24	William Byron (P)	Hendrick Motorsports	Chevrolet	29.025	169.426
12	12	Ryan Blaney (P)	Team Penske	Ford	29.032	169.386
13	7	Justin Haley	Spire Motorsports	Chevrolet	29.060	169.222
14	22	Joey Logano (P)	Team Penske	Ford	29.080	169.106
15	17	Chris Buescher	RFK Racing	Ford	29.082	169.094
16	54	Ty Gibbs	Joe Gibbs Racing	Toyota	29.127	168.833
17	99	Daniel Suárez	Trackhouse Racing	Chevrolet	29.172	168.573
18	41	Cole Custer	Haas Factory Team	Ford	29.196	168.434
19	43	Erik Jones	Legacy Motor Club	Toyota	29.216	168.319
20	88	Shane van Gisbergen (P) (R)	Trackhouse Racing	Chevrolet	29.223	168.278
21	9	Chase Elliott (P)	Hendrick Motorsports	Chevrolet	29.226	168.261
22	16	A. J. Allmendinger	Kaulig Racing	Chevrolet	29.234	168.215
23	8	Kyle Busch	Richard Childress Racing	Chevrolet	29.235	168.209
24	38	Zane Smith	Front Row Motorsports	Ford	29.245	168.152
25	71	Michael McDowell	Spire Motorsports	Chevrolet	29.249	168.129
26	77	Carson Hocevar	Spire Motorsports	Chevrolet	29.249	168.129
27	60	Ryan Preece	RFK Racing	Ford	29.254	168.100
28	34	Todd Gilliland	Front Row Motorsports	Ford	29.263	168.048
29	48	Alex Bowman (P)	Hendrick Motorsports	Chevrolet	29.269	168.014
30	42	John Hunter Nemechek	Legacy Motor Club	Toyota	29.327	167.682
31	10	Ty Dillon	Kaulig Racing	Chevrolet	29.338	167.619
32	6	Brad Keselowski	RFK Racing	Ford	29.401	167.260
33	35	Riley Herbst (R)	23XI Racing	Toyota	29.445	167.010
34	4	Noah Gragson	Front Row Motorsports	Ford	29.511	166.636
35	47	Ricky Stenhouse Jr.	Hyak Motorsports	Chevrolet	29.663	165.782
36	51	Cody Ware	Rick Ware Racing	Ford	29.997	163.936
37	44	Derek Kraus	NY Racing Team	Chevrolet	30.451	161.492
38	66	Timmy Hill (i)	Garage 66	Ford	31.025	158.504
Official qualifying results

== Race ==
=== Race results ===
==== Stage results ====
Stage One Laps: 115

Pos	No	Driver	Team	Manufacturer	Points
1	19	Chase Briscoe (P)	Joe Gibbs Racing	Toyota	10
2	45	Tyler Reddick (P)	23XI Racing	Toyota	9
3	11	Denny Hamlin (P)	Joe Gibbs Racing	Toyota	8
4	1	Ross Chastain (P)	Trackhouse Racing	Chevrolet	7
5	23	Bubba Wallace (P)	23XI Racing	Toyota	6
6	5	Kyle Larson (P)	Hendrick Motorsports	Chevrolet	5
7	20	Christopher Bell (P)	Joe Gibbs Racing	Toyota	4
8	2	Austin Cindric (P)	Team Penske	Ford	3
9	42	John Hunter Nemechek	Legacy Motor Club	Toyota	2
10	12	Ryan Blaney (P)	Team Penske	Ford	1
Official stage one results

Stage Two Laps: 115

Pos	No	Driver	Team	Manufacturer	Points
1	19	Chase Briscoe (P)	Joe Gibbs Racing	Toyota	10
2	45	Tyler Reddick (P)	23XI Racing	Toyota	9
3	43	Erik Jones	Legacy Motor Club	Toyota	8
4	5	Kyle Larson (P)	Hendrick Motorsports	Chevrolet	7
5	16	A. J. Allmendinger	Kaulig Racing	Chevrolet	6
6	1	Ross Chastain (P)	Trackhouse Racing	Chevrolet	5
7	23	Bubba Wallace (P)	23XI Racing	Toyota	4
8	42	John Hunter Nemechek	Legacy Motor Club	Toyota	3
9	60	Ryan Preece	RFK Racing	Ford	2
10	24	William Byron (P)	Hendrick Motorsports	Chevrolet	1
Official stage two results

=== Final Stage results ===
Stage Three Laps: 137

Pos	Grid	No	Driver	Team	Manufacturer	Laps	Points
1	2	19	Chase Briscoe (P)	Joe Gibbs Racing	Toyota	367	60
2	4	45	Tyler Reddick (P)	23XI Racing	Toyota	367	53
3	19	43	Erik Jones	Legacy Motor Club	Toyota	367	42
4	30	42	John Hunter Nemechek	Legacy Motor Club	Toyota	367	38
5	22	16	A. J. Allmendinger	Kaulig Racing	Chevrolet	367	38
6	8	23	Bubba Wallace (P)	23XI Racing	Toyota	367	41
7	1	11	Denny Hamlin (P)	Joe Gibbs Racing	Toyota	367	38
8	23	8	Kyle Busch	Richard Childress Racing	Chevrolet	367	29
9	26	77	Carson Hocevar	Spire Motorsports	Chevrolet	367	28
10	15	17	Chris Buescher	RFK Racing	Ford	367	27
11	6	1	Ross Chastain (P)	Trackhouse Racing	Chevrolet	367	38
12	10	2	Austin Cindric (P)	Team Penske	Ford	367	28
13	24	38	Zane Smith	Front Row Motorsports	Ford	367	24
14	34	4	Noah Gragson	Front Row Motorsports	Ford	367	23
15	32	6	Brad Keselowski	RFK Racing	Ford	367	22
16	27	60	Ryan Preece	RFK Racing	Ford	367	21
17	21	9	Chase Elliott (P)	Hendrick Motorsports	Chevrolet	367	20
18	12	12	Ryan Blaney (P)	Team Penske	Ford	367	20
19	5	5	Kyle Larson (P)	Hendrick Motorsports	Chevrolet	367	30
20	14	22	Joey Logano (P)	Team Penske	Ford	367	17
21	11	24	William Byron (P)	Hendrick Motorsports	Chevrolet	367	17
22	16	54	Ty Gibbs	Joe Gibbs Racing	Toyota	367	15
23	9	3	Austin Dillon (P)	Richard Childress Racing	Chevrolet	367	14
24	18	41	Cole Custer	Haas Factory Team	Ford	367	13
25	17	99	Daniel Suárez	Trackhouse Racing	Chevrolet	366	12
26	28	34	Todd Gilliland	Front Row Motorsports	Ford	366	11
27	13	7	Justin Haley	Spire Motorsports	Chevrolet	366	10
28	33	35	Riley Herbst (R)	23XI Racing	Toyota	366	9
29	7	20	Christopher Bell (P)	Joe Gibbs Racing	Toyota	365	12
30	35	47	Ricky Stenhouse Jr.	Hyak Motorsports	Chevrolet	365	7
31	29	48	Alex Bowman (P)	Hendrick Motorsports	Chevrolet	365	6
32	20	88	Shane van Gisbergen (P) (R)	Trackhouse Racing	Chevrolet	365	5
33	25	71	Michael McDowell	Spire Motorsports	Chevrolet	365	4
34	31	10	Ty Dillon	Kaulig Racing	Chevrolet	365	3
35	38	66	Timmy Hill (i)	Garage 66	Ford	354	0
36	37	44	Derek Kraus	NY Racing Team	Chevrolet	282	1
37	36	51	Cody Ware	Rick Ware Racing	Ford	249	1
38	3	21	Josh Berry (P)	Wood Brothers Racing	Ford	239	2
Official race results

=== Race statistics ===
- Lead changes: 24 among 10 different drivers
- Cautions/Laps: 7 for 37 laps
- Red flags: 0
- Time of race: 3 hours, 51 minutes and 7 seconds
- Average speed: 130.148 miles per hour (209.453 km/h)

== Media ==
=== Television ===
USA covered the race on the television side. Leigh Diffey, two–time Darlington winner Jeff Burton and Steve Letarte called the race from the broadcast booth. Dave Burns, Kim Coon, Parker Kligerman and Marty Snider handled the pit road duties from pit lane.

USA
Booth announcers	Pit reporters
Lap-by-lap: Leigh Diffey; Color-commentator: Jeff Burton; Color-commentator: Steve Letarte	Dave Burns; Kim Coon; Parker Kligerman; Marty Snider

=== Radio ===
MRN had the radio call for the race, which was also simulcast on Sirius XM NASCAR Radio.

MRN Radio
Booth announcers	Turn announcers	Pit reporters
Lead announcer: Alex Hayden; Announcer: Mike Bagley; Announcer: Todd Gordon	Turns 1 & 2: Dave Moody; Turns 3 & 4: Kurt Becker	Steve Post; Chris Wilner; Brienne Pedigo

== Standings after the race ==
Drivers' Championship standings

	Pos	Driver	Points
7	1	Chase Briscoe	2,070
1	2	Denny Hamlin	2,067 (–3)
2	3	Kyle Larson	2,062 (–8)
10	4	Tyler Reddick	2,059 (–11)
4	5	Bubba Wallace	2,049 (–21)
4	6	William Byron	2,049 (–21)
3	7	Ryan Blaney	2,046 (–24)
3	8	Ross Chastain	2,045 (–25)
1	9	Austin Cindric	2,036 (–34)
5	10	Christopher Bell	2,035 (–35)
4	11	Chase Elliott	2,033 (–37)
6	12	Shane van Gisbergen	2,027 (–43)
1	13	Joey Logano	2,024 (–46)
1	14	Austin Dillon	2,019 (–51)
1	15	Alex Bowman	2,008 (–62)
3	16	Josh Berry	2,008 (–62)
Official driver's standings

Manufacturers' Championship standings

Pos	Manufacturer	Points
1	Chevrolet	992
2	Toyota	960 (–32)
3	Ford	899 (–93)

- Note: Only the first 16 positions are included for the driver standings.

Previous race: 2025 Coke Zero Sugar 400	NASCAR Cup Series; 2025 season	Next race: 2025 Enjoy Illinois 300
