= 2022 Ruoff Mortgage 500 =

Fourth race of the 2022 NASCAR Cup Series

Race details
- Race 4 of 36 in the 2022 NASCAR Cup Series
- The 2022 Ruoff Mortgage 500 program cover, featuring Martin Truex Jr., winner of last year's race.
- Date: March 13, 2022
- Location: Phoenix Raceway in Avondale, Arizona
- Course: Permanent racing facility
- Course length: 1.022 miles (1.645 km)
- Distance: 312 laps, 318.864 mi (513.162 km)
- Average speed: 100.339 miles per hour (161.480 km/h)

Pole position
Driver	Ryan Blaney	Team Penske
- Time: 27.127

Most laps led
Driver	Ryan Blaney	Team Penske
- Laps: 143

Winner
No. 14	Chase Briscoe	Stewart-Haas Racing

Television in the United States
- Network: Fox
- Announcers: Mike Joy, Clint Bowyer, and Danica Patrick
- Nielsen ratings: 2.33, 3.991 Million Viewers

Radio in the United States
- Radio: MRN
- Booth announcers: Alex Hayden and Jeff Striegle
- Turn announcers: Dan Hubbard (1 & 2) and Kyle Rickey (3 & 4)

The 2022 Ruoff Mortgage 500 was the fourth stock car race of the 2022 NASCAR Cup Series and the 18th running of the event. The race was held on Sunday, March 13, 2022, in Avondale, Arizona at Phoenix Raceway, a 1 mile (1.6 km) permanent low-banked tri-oval race track. The race took the scheduled 312 laps to complete. At race's end, Chase Briscoe, driving for Stewart-Haas Racing, pulled away on the final restart with three laps to go to capture his first career NASCAR Cup Series win and his first of the season. To fill out the top 3, Ross Chastain of the Trackhouse Racing Team and Tyler Reddick of Richard Childress Racing would finish second and third, respectively.

== Report ==
=== Background ===
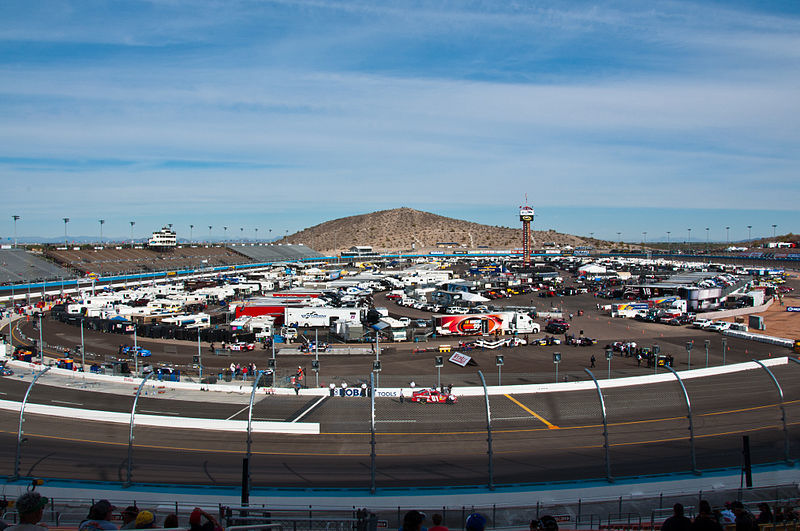
Phoenix Raceway, the track where the race was held.

Phoenix Raceway, is a 1.022 mi (1.645 km), low-banked tri-oval race track located in Avondale, Arizona. The motorsport track opened in 1964 and currently hosts two NASCAR race weekends annually. PIR has also hosted the IndyCar Series, CART, USAC and the Rolex Sports Car Series. The raceway is currently owned and operated by International Speedway Corporation.

The raceway was originally constructed with a 2.5 mi (4.0 km) road course that ran both inside and outside of the main tri-oval. In 1991 the track was reconfigured with the current 1.51 mi (2.43 km) interior layout. PIR has an estimated grandstand seating capacity of around 67,000. Lights were installed around the track in 2004 following the addition of a second annual NASCAR race weekend.

==== Entry list ====
- (R) denotes rookie driver.
- (i) denotes driver who is ineligible for series driver points.

No.	Driver	Team	Manufacturer
1	Ross Chastain	Trackhouse Racing Team	Chevrolet
2	Austin Cindric (R)	Team Penske	Ford
3	Austin Dillon	Richard Childress Racing	Chevrolet
4	Kevin Harvick	Stewart-Haas Racing	Ford
5	Kyle Larson	Hendrick Motorsports	Chevrolet
6	Brad Keselowski	RFK Racing	Ford
7	Corey LaJoie	Spire Motorsports	Chevrolet
8	Tyler Reddick	Richard Childress Racing	Chevrolet
9	Chase Elliott	Hendrick Motorsports	Chevrolet
10	Aric Almirola	Stewart-Haas Racing	Ford
11	Denny Hamlin	Joe Gibbs Racing	Toyota
12	Ryan Blaney	Team Penske	Ford
14	Chase Briscoe	Stewart-Haas Racing	Ford
15	Garrett Smithley	Rick Ware Racing	Ford
16	A. J. Allmendinger (i)	Kaulig Racing	Chevrolet
17	Chris Buescher	RFK Racing	Ford
18	Kyle Busch	Joe Gibbs Racing	Toyota
19	Martin Truex Jr.	Joe Gibbs Racing	Toyota
20	Christopher Bell	Joe Gibbs Racing	Toyota
21	Harrison Burton (R)	Wood Brothers Racing	Ford
22	Joey Logano	Team Penske	Ford
23	Bubba Wallace	23XI Racing	Toyota
24	William Byron	Hendrick Motorsports	Chevrolet
31	Justin Haley	Kaulig Racing	Chevrolet
34	Michael McDowell	Front Row Motorsports	Ford
38	Todd Gilliland (R)	Front Row Motorsports	Ford
41	Cole Custer	Stewart-Haas Racing	Ford
42	Ty Dillon	Petty GMS Motorsports	Chevrolet
43	Erik Jones	Petty GMS Motorsports	Chevrolet
45	Kurt Busch	23XI Racing	Toyota
47	Ricky Stenhouse Jr.	JTG Daugherty Racing	Chevrolet
48	Alex Bowman	Hendrick Motorsports	Chevrolet
51	Cody Ware	Rick Ware Racing	Ford
77	Landon Cassill (i)	Spire Motorsports	Chevrolet
78	B. J. McLeod	Live Fast Motorsports	Ford
99	Daniel Suárez	Trackhouse Racing Team	Chevrolet
Official entry list

== Practice ==
Austin Cindric was the fastest in the practice session with a time of 27.462 seconds and a speed of 131.090 mph (210.969 km/h).

=== Practice results ===
Pos	No.	Driver	Team	Manufacturer	Time	Speed
1	2	Austin Cindric (R)	Team Penske	Ford	27.462	131.090
2	12	Ryan Blaney	Team Penske	Ford	27.471	131.047
3	8	Tyler Reddick	Richard Childress Racing	Chevrolet	27.477	131.019
Official practice results

== Qualifying ==
Ryan Blaney scored the pole for the race with a time of 27.127 seconds and a speed of 132.709 mph (213.574 km/h).

=== Qualifying results ===
Pos	No.	Driver	Team	Manufacturer	R1	R2
1	12	Ryan Blaney	Team Penske	Ford	27.116	27.127
2	11	Denny Hamlin	Joe Gibbs Racing	Toyota	27.189	27.200
3	24	William Byron	Hendrick Motorsports	Chevrolet	27.303	27.216
4	20	Christopher Bell	Joe Gibbs Racing	Toyota	27.170	27.217
5	10	Aric Almirola	Stewart-Haas Racing	Ford	27.159	27.276
6	14	Chase Briscoe	Stewart-Haas Racing	Ford	27.377	27.284
7	5	Kyle Larson	Hendrick Motorsports	Chevrolet	27.177	27.285
8	2	Austin Cindric (R)	Team Penske	Ford	27.359	27.299
9	48	Alex Bowman	Hendrick Motorsports	Chevrolet	27.412	27.320
10	22	Joey Logano	Team Penske	Ford	27.478	27.709
11	18	Kyle Busch	Joe Gibbs Racing	Toyota	27.254	—
12	8	Tyler Reddick	Richard Childress Racing	Chevrolet	27.323	—
13	3	Austin Dillon	Richard Childress Racing	Chevrolet	27.360	—
14	43	Erik Jones	Petty GMS Motorsports	Chevrolet	27.466	—
15	45	Kurt Busch	23XI Racing	Toyota	27.505	—
16	4	Kevin Harvick	Stewart-Haas Racing	Ford	27.519	—
17	1	Ross Chastain	Trackhouse Racing Team	Chevrolet	27.539	—
18	6	Brad Keselowski	RFK Racing	Ford	27.544	—
19	9	Chase Elliott	Hendrick Motorsports	Chevrolet	27.586	—
20	19	Martin Truex Jr.	Joe Gibbs Racing	Toyota	27.602	—
21	42	Ty Dillon	Petty GMS Motorsports	Chevrolet	27.623	—
22	34	Michael McDowell	Front Row Motorsports	Ford	27.663	—
23	99	Daniel Suárez	Trackhouse Racing Team	Chevrolet	27.669	—
24	21	Harrison Burton (R)	Wood Brothers Racing	Ford	27.673	—
25	41	Cole Custer	Stewart-Haas Racing	Ford	27.691	—
26	17	Chris Buescher	RFK Racing	Ford	27.714	—
27	23	Bubba Wallace	23XI Racing	Toyota	27.738	—
28	31	Justin Haley	Kaulig Racing	Chevrolet	27.765	—
29	16	A. J. Allmendinger (i)	Kaulig Racing	Chevrolet	27.806	—
30	7	Corey LaJoie	Spire Motorsports	Chevrolet	28.046	—
31	77	Landon Cassill (i)	Spire Motorsports	Chevrolet	28.285	—
32	51	Cody Ware	Rick Ware Racing	Ford	28.288	—
33	38	Todd Gilliland (R)	Front Row Motorsports	Ford	28.299	—
34	78	B. J. McLeod	Live Fast Motorsports	Ford	28.451	—
35	15	Garrett Smithley	Rick Ware Racing	Ford	29.193	—
36	47	Ricky Stenhouse Jr.	JTG Daugherty Racing	Chevrolet	0.000	—
Official qualifying results

== Race ==
=== Stage Results ===
Stage One Laps: 60

Pos	No	Driver	Team	Manufacturer	Points
1	24	William Byron	Hendrick Motorsports	Chevrolet	10
2	14	Chase Briscoe	Stewart-Haas Racing	Ford	9
3	9	Chase Elliott	Hendrick Motorsports	Chevrolet	8
4	8	Tyler Reddick	Richard Childress Racing	Chevrolet	7
5	48	Alex Bowman	Hendrick Motorsports	Chevrolet	6
6	20	Christopher Bell	Joe Gibbs Racing	Toyota	5
7	5	Kyle Larson	Hendrick Motorsports	Chevrolet	4
8	4	Kevin Harvick	Stewart-Haas Racing	Ford	3
9	22	Joey Logano	Team Penske	Ford	2
10	3	Austin Dillon	Richard Childress Racing	Chevrolet	1
Official stage one results

Stage Two Laps: 125

Pos	No	Driver	Team	Manufacturer	Points
1	12	Ryan Blaney	Team Penske	Ford	10
2	9	Chase Elliott	Hendrick Motorsports	Chevrolet	9
3	4	Kevin Harvick	Stewart-Haas Racing	Ford	8
4	24	William Byron	Hendrick Motorsports	Chevrolet	7
5	5	Kyle Larson	Hendrick Motorsports	Chevrolet	6
6	8	Tyler Reddick	Richard Childress Racing	Chevrolet	5
7	1	Ross Chastain	Trackhouse Racing Team	Chevrolet	4
8	14	Chase Briscoe	Stewart-Haas Racing	Ford	3
9	3	Austin Dillon	Richard Childress Racing	Chevrolet	2
10	22	Joey Logano	Team Penske	Ford	1
Official stage two results

=== Final Stage Results ===
Stage Three Laps: 127

Pos	Grid	No	Driver	Team	Manufacturer	Laps	Points
1	6	14	Chase Briscoe	Stewart-Haas Racing	Ford	312	52
2	17	1	Ross Chastain	Trackhouse Racing Team	Chevrolet	312	39
3	12	8	Tyler Reddick	Richard Childress Racing	Chevrolet	312	46
4	1	12	Ryan Blaney	Team Penske	Ford	312	43
5	15	45	Kurt Busch	23XI Racing	Toyota	312	32
6	16	4	Kevin Harvick	Stewart-Haas Racing	Ford	312	42
7	11	18	Kyle Busch	Joe Gibbs Racing	Toyota	312	30
8	10	22	Joey Logano	Team Penske	Ford	312	32
9	23	99	Daniel Suárez	Trackhouse Racing Team	Chevrolet	312	28
10	26	17	Chris Buescher	RFK Racing	Ford	312	27
11	19	9	Chase Elliott	Hendrick Motorsports	Chevrolet	312	43
12	5	10	Aric Almirola	Stewart-Haas Racing	Ford	312	25
13	2	11	Denny Hamlin	Joe Gibbs Racing	Toyota	312	24
14	9	48	Alex Bowman	Hendrick Motorsports	Chevrolet	312	29
15	21	42	Ty Dillon	Petty GMS Motorsports	Chevrolet	312	22
16	25	41	Cole Custer	Stewart-Haas Racing	Ford	312	21
17	28	31	Justin Haley	Kaulig Racing	Chevrolet	312	20
18	3	24	William Byron	Hendrick Motorsports	Chevrolet	312	36
19	33	38	Todd Gilliland (R)	Front Row Motorsports	Ford	312	18
20	29	16	A.J. Allmendinger (i)	Kaulig Racing	Chevrolet	312	0
21	13	3	Austin Dillon	Richard Childress Racing	Chevrolet	312	19
22	27	23	Bubba Wallace	23XI Racing	Toyota	311	15
23	18	6	Brad Keselowski	RFK Racing	Ford	311	14
24	8	2	Austin Cindric (R)	Team Penske	Ford	311	13
25	14	43	Erik Jones	Petty GMS Motorsports	Chevrolet	311	12
26	4	20	Christopher Bell	Joe Gibbs Racing	Toyota	310	16
27	22	34	Michael McDowell	Front Row Motorsports	Ford	310	10
28	36	47	Ricky Stenhouse Jr.	JTG Daugherty Racing	Chevrolet	310	9
29	24	21	Harrison Burton (R)	Wood Brothers Racing	Ford	309	8
30	31	77	Landon Cassill (i)	Spire Motorsports	Chevrolet	308	0
31	32	51	Cody Ware	Rick Ware Racing	Ford	307	6
32	35	15	Garrett Smithley	Rick Ware Racing	Ford	305	5
33	34	78	B.J. McLeod	Live Fast Motorsports	Ford	304	4
34	7	5	Kyle Larson	Hendrick Motorsports	Chevrolet	239	13
35	20	19	Martin Truex Jr.	Joe Gibbs Racing	Toyota	219	2
36	30	7	Corey LaJoie	Spire Motorsports	Chevrolet	45	1
Official race results

=== Race statistics ===
- Lead changes: 14 among 6 different drivers
- Cautions/Laps: 8 for 52
- Red flags: 0
- Time of race: 3 hours, 6 minutes and 34 seconds
- Average speed: 100.339 miles per hour (161.480 km/h)

== Media ==
=== Television ===
Fox Sports covered their 17th race at the Phoenix Raceway. Mike Joy, Clint Bowyer, and Danica Patrick called the race from the broadcast booth. Jamie Little and Regan Smith handled pit road, while Larry McReynolds provided insight from the Fox Sports studio in Charlotte.

Fox
Booth announcers	Pit reporters	In-race analyst
Lap-by-lap: Mike Joy; Color-commentator: Clint Bowyer; Color-commentator: Danica Patrick	Jamie Little; Regan Smith	Larry McReynolds

=== Radio ===
MRN covered the radio action for the race which was also simulcasted on Sirius XM NASCAR Radio. Alex Hayden and Jeff Striegle called the race when the field raced past the start/finish line. Dan Hubbard called the action from turns 1 & 2, and Kyle Rickey called the action from turns 3 & 4. Pit lane was manned by Steve Post and Jason Toy.

MRN
Booth announcers	Turn announcers	Pit reporters
Lead announcer: Alex Hayden; Announcer: Jeff Striegle	Turns 1 & 2: Dan Hubbard; Turns 3 & 4: Kyle Rickey	Steve Post; Jason Toy

== Standings after the race ==
Drivers' Championship standings

	Pos	Driver	Points
2	1	Joey Logano	136
3	2	Kyle Busch	132 (–4)
4	3	Chase Elliott	131 (–5)
3	4	Kyle Larson	126 (–10)
9	5	Chase Briscoe	126 (–10)
	6	Aric Almirola	122 (–14)
6	7	Ryan Blaney	118 (–18)
4	8	Austin Cindric	116 (–20)
9	9	Tyler Reddick	114 (–22)
6	10	Kevin Harvick	111 (–25)
3	11	Alex Bowman	109 (–27)
1	12	Kurt Busch	109 (–27)
11	13	Martin Truex Jr.	109 (–27)
6	14	Ross Chastain	101 (–35)
6	15	William Byron	98 (–38)
6	16	Austin Dillon	97 (–39)
Official driver's standings

Manufacturers' Championship standings

	Pos	Manufacturer	Points
1	1	Ford	143
1	2	Chevrolet	142 (–1)
	3	Toyota	129 (–14)

- Note: Only the first 16 positions are included for the driver standings.

Previous race: 2022 Pennzoil 400	NASCAR Cup Series; 2022 season	Next race: 2022 Folds of Honor QuikTrip 500
