= Richard Petty Motorsports (disambiguation) =

Richard Petty Motorsports was a NASCAR auto racing team which operated from 2009–2021.

Richard Petty Motorsports may also refer to:

- Petty GMS Motorsports, a NASCAR team now named Legacy Motor Club
- Petty Enterprises, a defunct NASCAR team which operated from 1949–2008
