= 2023 AdventHealth 400 =

NASCAR Cup Series race

Race details
- Race 12 of 36 in the 2023 NASCAR Cup Series
- Date: May 7, 2023
- Location: Kansas Speedway in Kansas City, Kansas, U.S.
- Course: Permanent racing facility
- Course length: 1.5 miles (2.4 km)
- Distance: 267 laps, 400.5 mi (644.542 km)
- Average speed: 117.564 miles per hour (189.201 km/h)

Pole position
Driver	William Byron	Hendrick Motorsports
- Time: 30.133

Most laps led
Driver	Kyle Larson	Hendrick Motorsports
- Laps: 85

Winner
No. 11	Denny Hamlin	Joe Gibbs Racing

Television in the United States
- Network: FS1
- Announcers: Mike Joy, Clint Bowyer, and Kurt Busch

Radio in the United States
- Radio: MRN
- Booth announcers: Alex Hayden, Jeff Striegle, and Todd Gordon
- Turn announcers: Dave Moody (1 & 2) and Kurt Becker (3 & 4)

The 2023 AdventHealth 400 was a NASCAR Cup Series race held on May 7, 2023, at Kansas Speedway in Kansas City, Kansas. Contested over 267 laps on the 1.5-mile (2.4 km) asphalt speedway, it was the 12th race of the 2023 NASCAR Cup Series season.

== Report ==
=== Background ===
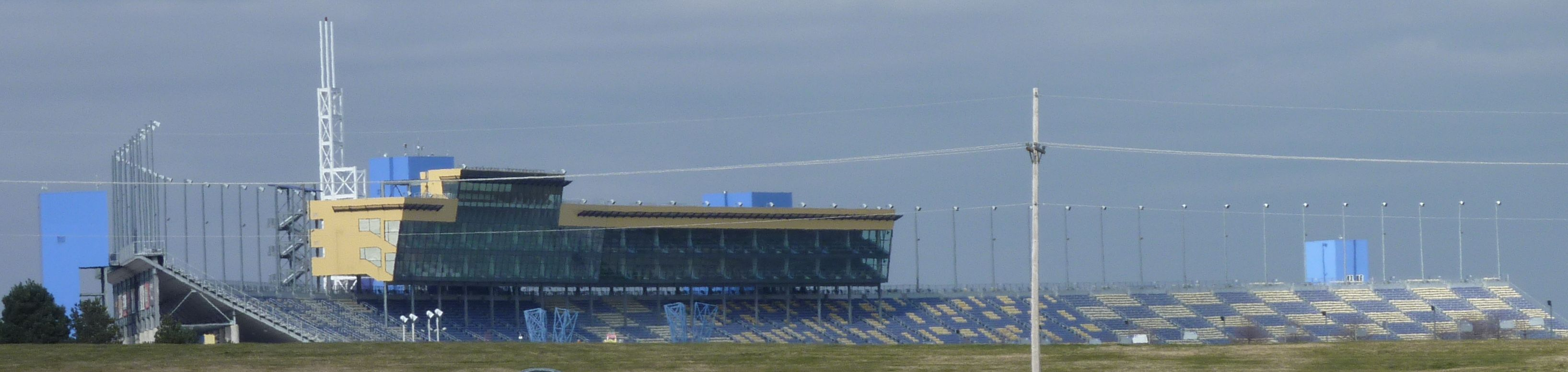
The layout of Kansas Speedway, the venue where the race was held.

Kansas Speedway is a 1.5-mile (2.4 km) tri-oval race track in Kansas City, Kansas. It was built in 2001 and hosts two annual NASCAR race weekends. The NTT IndyCar Series also raced there until 2011. The speedway is owned and operated by the International Speedway Corporation.

==== Entry list ====
- (R) denotes rookie driver.
- (i) denotes the driver ineligible for series driver points.

No.	Driver	Team	Manufacturer
1	Ross Chastain	Trackhouse Racing	Chevrolet
2	Austin Cindric	Team Penske	Ford
3	Austin Dillon	Richard Childress Racing	Chevrolet
4	Kevin Harvick	Stewart-Haas Racing	Ford
5	Kyle Larson	Hendrick Motorsports	Chevrolet
6	Brad Keselowski	RFK Racing	Ford
7	Corey LaJoie	Spire Motorsports	Chevrolet
8	Kyle Busch	Richard Childress Racing	Chevrolet
9	Chase Elliott	Hendrick Motorsports	Chevrolet
10	Aric Almirola	Stewart-Haas Racing	Ford
11	Denny Hamlin	Joe Gibbs Racing	Toyota
12	Ryan Blaney	Team Penske	Ford
14	Chase Briscoe	Stewart-Haas Racing	Ford
15	Brennan Poole (i)	Rick Ware Racing	Ford
16	A. J. Allmendinger	Kaulig Racing	Chevrolet
17	Chris Buescher	RFK Racing	Ford
19	Martin Truex Jr.	Joe Gibbs Racing	Toyota
20	Christopher Bell	Joe Gibbs Racing	Toyota
21	Harrison Burton	Wood Brothers Racing	Ford
22	Joey Logano	Team Penske	Ford
23	Bubba Wallace	23XI Racing	Toyota
24	William Byron	Hendrick Motorsports	Chevrolet
31	Justin Haley	Kaulig Racing	Chevrolet
34	Michael McDowell	Front Row Motorsports	Ford
38	Todd Gilliland	Front Row Motorsports	Ford
41	Ryan Preece	Stewart-Haas Racing	Ford
42	Noah Gragson (R)	Legacy Motor Club	Chevrolet
43	Erik Jones	Legacy Motor Club	Chevrolet
45	Tyler Reddick	23XI Racing	Toyota
47	Ricky Stenhouse Jr.	JTG Daugherty Racing	Chevrolet
48	Josh Berry (i)	Hendrick Motorsports	Chevrolet
51	J. J. Yeley (i)	Rick Ware Racing	Ford
54	Ty Gibbs (R)	Joe Gibbs Racing	Toyota
77	Ty Dillon	Spire Motorsports	Chevrolet
78	Josh Bilicki (i)	Live Fast Motorsports	Chevrolet
99	Daniel Suárez	Trackhouse Racing	Chevrolet
Official entry list

== Practice ==
Denny Hamlin was the fastest in the practice session with a time of 30.877 seconds and a speed of 174.887 mph (281.453 km/h).

=== Practice results ===
Pos	No.	Driver	Team	Manufacturer	Time	Speed
1	11	Denny Hamlin	Joe Gibbs Racing	Toyota	30.877	174.887
2	2	Austin Cindric	Team Penske	Ford	30.940	174.531
3	8	Kyle Busch	Richard Childress Racing	Chevrolet	30.981	174.300
Official practice results

== Qualifying ==
William Byron scored the pole for the race with a time of 30.133 and a speed of 179.206 mph (288.404 km/h).

=== Qualifying results ===
Pos	No.	Driver	Team	Manufacturer	R1	R2
1	24	William Byron	Hendrick Motorsports	Chevrolet	30.496	30.133
2	5	Kyle Larson	Hendrick Motorsports	Chevrolet	30.260	30.139
3	1	Ross Chastain	Trackhouse Racing	Chevrolet	30.224	30.145
4	19	Martin Truex Jr.	Joe Gibbs Racing	Toyota	30.488	30.181
5	45	Tyler Reddick	23XI Racing	Toyota	30.233	30.210
6	22	Joey Logano	Team Penske	Ford	30.631	30.255
7	54	Ty Gibbs (R)	Joe Gibbs Racing	Toyota	30.432	30.269
8	11	Denny Hamlin	Joe Gibbs Racing	Toyota	30.435	30.301
9	99	Daniel Suárez	Trackhouse Racing	Chevrolet	30.633	30.384
10	12	Ryan Blaney	Team Penske	Ford	30.580	30.426
11	3	Austin Dillon	Richard Childress Racing	Chevrolet	30.445	—
12	20	Christopher Bell	Joe Gibbs Racing	Toyota	30.450	—
13	4	Kevin Harvick	Stewart-Haas Racing	Ford	30.473	—
14	17	Chris Buescher	RFK Racing	Ford	30.473	—
15	2	Austin Cindric	Team Penske	Ford	30.503	—
16	8	Kyle Busch	Richard Childress Racing	Chevrolet	30.513	—
17	23	Bubba Wallace	23XI Racing	Toyota	30.647	—
18	10	Aric Almirola	Stewart-Haas Racing	Ford	30.730	—
19	43	Erik Jones	Legacy Motor Club	Chevrolet	30.743	—
20	6	Brad Keselowski	RFK Racing	Ford	30.745	—
21	9	Chase Elliott	Hendrick Motorsports	Chevrolet	30.788	—
22	42	Noah Gragson (R)	Legacy Motor Club	Chevrolet	30.799	—
23	34	Michael McDowell	Front Row Motorsports	Ford	30.838	—
24	7	Corey LaJoie	Spire Motorsports	Chevrolet	30.863	—
25	21	Harrison Burton	Wood Brothers Racing	Ford	30.865	—
26	77	Ty Dillon	Spire Motorsports	Chevrolet	30.920	—
27	16	A. J. Allmendinger	Kaulig Racing	Chevrolet	30.945	—
28	41	Ryan Preece	Stewart-Haas Racing	Ford	30.968	—
29	48	Josh Berry (i)	Hendrick Motorsports	Chevrolet	31.036	—
30	31	Justin Haley	Kaulig Racing	Chevrolet	31.114	—
31	14	Chase Briscoe	Stewart-Haas Racing	Ford	31.149	—
32	38	Todd Gilliland	Front Row Motorsports	Ford	31.236	—
33	47	Ricky Stenhouse Jr.	JTG Daugherty Racing	Chevrolet	31.421	—
34	15	Brennan Poole (i)	Rick Ware Racing	Ford	31.473	—
35	51	J. J. Yeley (i)	Rick Ware Racing	Ford	31.602	—
36	78	Josh Bilicki (i)	Live Fast Motorsports	Chevrolet	0.000	—
Official qualifying results

== Race ==
=== Post Race ===
After the race was over, there was a big fistfight on pit road between Noah Gragson and Ross Chastain on pit road. The two were discussing an on track incident where Gragson hit the wall when things started to escalate quickly when Gragson grabbed Chastain's firesuit. Chastain told Gragson to stop but Gragson didn't and Chastain responded by throwing a punch at Gragson that connected and the two got into a scuffle on pit road. Gragson tried to punch Chastain back but was held back by security and the two were eventually separated on pit road.

=== Race results ===
==== Stage results ====
Stage One Laps: 80

Pos	No	Driver	Team	Manufacturer	Points
1	11	Denny Hamlin	Joe Gibbs Racing	Toyota	10
2	19	Martin Truex Jr.	Joe Gibbs Racing	Toyota	9
3	54	Ty Gibbs (R)	Joe Gibbs Racing	Toyota	8
4	45	Tyler Reddick	23XI Racing	Toyota	7
5	99	Daniel Suárez	Trackhouse Racing	Chevrolet	6
6	20	Christopher Bell	Joe Gibbs Racing	Toyota	5
7	23	Bubba Wallace	23XI Racing	Toyota	4
8	12	Ryan Blaney	Team Penske	Ford	3
9	1	Ross Chastain	Trackhouse Racing	Chevrolet	2
10	5	Kyle Larson	Hendrick Motorsports	Chevrolet	1
Official stage one results

Stage Two Laps: 85

Pos	No	Driver	Team	Manufacturer	Points
1	22	Joey Logano	Team Penske	Ford	10
2	34	Michael McDowell	Front Row Motorsports	Ford	9
3	42	Noah Gragson (R)	Legacy Motor Club	Chevrolet	8
4	43	Erik Jones	Legacy Motor Club	Chevrolet	7
5	16	A. J. Allmendinger	Kaulig Racing	Chevrolet	6
6	17	Chris Buescher	RFK Racing	Ford	5
7	3	Austin Dillon	Richard Childress Racing	Chevrolet	4
8	77	Ty Dillon	Spire Motorsports	Chevrolet	3
9	5	Kyle Larson	Hendrick Motorsports	Chevrolet	2
10	11	Denny Hamlin	Joe Gibbs Racing	Toyota	1
Official stage two results

=== Final Stage results ===
Stage Three Laps: 102

Pos	Grid	No	Driver	Team	Manufacturer	Laps	Points
1	8	11	Denny Hamlin	Joe Gibbs Racing	Toyota	267	51
2	2	5	Kyle Larson	Hendrick Motorsports	Chevrolet	267	38
3	1	24	William Byron	Hendrick Motorsports	Chevrolet	267	34
4	17	23	Bubba Wallace	23XI Racing	Toyota	267	37
5	3	1	Ross Chastain	Trackhouse Racing	Chevrolet	267	34
6	6	22	Joey Logano	Team Penske	Ford	267	41
7	21	9	Chase Elliott	Hendrick Motorsports	Chevrolet	267	30
8	4	19	Martin Truex Jr.	Joe Gibbs Racing	Toyota	267	38
9	5	45	Tyler Reddick	23XI Racing	Toyota	267	35
10	11	3	Austin Dillon	Richard Childress Racing	Chevrolet	267	31
11	13	4	Kevin Harvick	Stewart-Haas Racing	Ford	267	26
12	33	47	Ricky Stenhouse Jr.	JTG Daugherty Racing	Chevrolet	267	25
13	18	10	Aric Almirola	Stewart-Haas Racing	Ford	267	24
14	27	16	A. J. Allmendinger	Kaulig Racing	Chevrolet	267	29
15	9	99	Daniel Suárez	Trackhouse Racing	Chevrolet	267	28
16	10	12	Ryan Blaney	Team Penske	Ford	267	24
17	14	17	Chris Buescher	RFK Racing	Ford	267	25
18	30	31	Justin Haley	Kaulig Racing	Chevrolet	267	19
19	20	6	Brad Keselowski	RFK Racing	Ford	267	18
20	24	7	Corey LaJoie	Spire Motorsports	Chevrolet	267	17
21	19	43	Erik Jones	Legacy Motor Club	Chevrolet	267	23
22	26	77	Ty Dillon	Spire Motorsports	Chevrolet	267	18
23	35	51	J. J. Yeley (i)	Rick Ware Racing	Ford	266	0
24	32	38	Todd Gilliland	Front Row Motorsports	Ford	266	13
25	29	48	Josh Berry (i)	Hendrick Motorsports	Chevrolet	266	0
26	23	34	Michael McDowell	Front Row Motorsports	Ford	266	20
27	28	41	Ryan Preece	Stewart-Haas Racing	Ford	266	10
28	34	15	Brennan Poole (i)	Rick Ware Racing	Ford	264	0
29	22	42	Noah Gragson (R)	Legacy Motor Club	Chevrolet	262	16
30	25	21	Harrison Burton	Wood Brothers Racing	Ford	261	7
31	15	2	Austin Cindric	Team Penske	Ford	260	6
32	31	14	Chase Briscoe	Stewart-Haas Racing	Ford	260	5
33	36	78	Josh Bilicki (i)	Live Fast Motorsports	Chevrolet	260	0
34	7	54	Ty Gibbs (R)	Joe Gibbs Racing	Toyota	176	11
35	16	8	Kyle Busch	Richard Childress Racing	Chevrolet	162	2
36	12	20	Christopher Bell	Joe Gibbs Racing	Toyota	157	6
Official race results

=== Race statistics ===
- Lead changes: 37 among 12 different drivers
- Cautions/Laps: 11 for 57 laps
- Red flags: 0
- Time of race: 3 hours, 24 minutes, and 24 seconds
- Average speed: 117.564 miles per hour (189.201 km/h)

== Media ==
=== Television ===
Fox Sports covered their 12th race at the Kansas Speedway. Mike Joy, Clint Bowyer and Kurt Busch called the race from the broadcast booth. Jamie Little, Regan Smith and Josh Sims handled the pit road for the television side. Larry McReynolds provided insight from the Fox Sports studio in Charlotte.

FS1
Booth announcers	Pit reporters	In-race analyst
Lap-by-lap: Mike Joy; Color-commentator: Clint Bowyer; Color-commentator: Kurt Busch	Jamie Little; Regan Smith; Josh Sims	Larry McReynolds

=== Radio ===
MRN had the radio call for the race which was also simulcast on Sirius XM NASCAR Radio. Alex Hayden, Jeff Striegle and former crew chief Todd Gordon called the race in the booth when the field raced through the tri-oval. Dave Moody covered the race from the Sunoco spotters stand outside turn 2 when the field was racing through turns 1 and 2. Mike Bagley called the race from a platform outside turn 4. Steve Post, Brienne Pedigo, and Jason Toy worked pit road for the radio side.

MRN
Booth announcers	Turn announcers	Pit reporters
Lead announcer: Alex Hayden; Announcer: Jeff Striegle; Announcer: Todd Gordon	Turns 1 & 2: Dave Moody; Turns 3 & 4: Mike Bagley	Steve Post; Brienne Pedigo; Jason Toy

== Standings after the race ==
Drivers' Championship standings

	Pos	Driver	Points
	1	Ross Chastain	404
	2	Christopher Bell	373 (–31)
1	3	Martin Truex Jr.	368 (–36)
3	4	Denny Hamlin	368 (–36)
2	5	Kevin Harvick	358 (–46)
	6	Tyler Reddick	354 (–50)
2	7	Ryan Blaney	350 (–54)
2	8	Kyle Larson	338 (–66)
2	9	William Byron	331 (–73)
1	10	Brad Keselowski	321 (–83)
2	11	Joey Logano	315 (–89)
4	12	Kyle Busch	308 (–96)
1	13	Chris Buescher	302 (–102)
	14	Ricky Stenhouse Jr.	295 (–109)
	15	Alex Bowman	270 (–134)
1	16	Daniel Suárez	259 (–145)
Official driver's standings

Manufacturers' Championship standings

Pos	Manufacturer	Points
1	Chevrolet	452
2	Toyota	422 (–30)
3	Ford	403 (–49)

- Note: Only the first 16 positions are included for the driver standings.
- . – Driver has clinched a position in the NASCAR Cup Series playoffs.

Previous race: 2023 Würth 400	NASCAR Cup Series; 2023 season	Next race: 2023 Goodyear 400
