= Cal Wells =

NASCAR team owner

Calvin Wells III
- Born: October 12, 1955 (age 69); Pomona, California, U.S.

Calvin Wells III (born October 12, 1955) is an American businessman and CEO of Legacy Motor Club. The former owner of PPI Motorsports, he later served as the executive vice president of operations at Michael Waltrip Racing, overseeing the day-to-day operations of the organization's three NASCAR Cup Series teams and one Nationwide Series team, until July 2011.

Before partnering with Michael Waltrip Racing, Wells owned PPI (Precision Preparation, Inc.) Motorsports was established in 1979, and became a top-performing NASCAR Cup organization from 2000 to 2006. As a Cup team owner, Wells visited Victory Lane twice with Ricky Craven behind the wheel of his PPI Motorsports entry. His multitude of drivers also earned him 10 top-five, 26 top-10 finishes and three pole awards during his tenure as an owner in the top-touring division.

== PPI Motorsports ==
Wells founded PPI during 1979 in Westminster, Calif. At the time, Toyota Motor Sales U.S.A. needed to promote their tough, reliable technology driven line of trucks through participation in Off-Road Championships, the Score Desert Series, including the Baja 500 and Baja 1000, and the Mickey Thompson Off-Road Championship Grand Prix (MTEG Stadium Series). Wells had already been successful in winning Off-Road races in the U.S. and Mexico and Toyota selected him to personally lead their foray into truck racing in the American market. With Off-Road legend Ivan "Ironman" Stewart, internationally successful brothers Steve and Rod Millen and Off Road, IndyCar and NASCAR winner Robby Gordon, PPI and Toyota won 88 races, 11 manufacturer championships including three Baja 1000s, 11 Baja 500s and five mint 400s.

As Toyota's interests peaked to enter the esteemed Indy Car/CART World Series in the mid-90s, they looked to Wells and his PPI team to support their entrance into America's premier open wheel series. As a new manufacturer to the division, Toyota had to meet requirements and align with an existing CART franchised team before adding teams outside existing CART ownership. PPI helped overcome these challenges by leading to the acquisition of franchise rights through the formation of Arcerio/Wells Racing, a PPI-owned company. Wells organization led Toyota's efforts, along with Dan Gurney's All-American Racers towards establishing a competitive effort in Indy Car.

In 1996, Wells helped established an engineering and supplier relationship with race car manufacturer Reynard. This relationship required creating a group solely responsible for the decision/adaptation of Toyota Power to a reasonably priced Reynard chassis. Wells led an international effort with Toyota Japan and Toyota U.S.A. to identify and recommend Reynard as the preferred partner and then establish a working team of over 100 members to support start up. Well's partnered and supported Toyota's evolution as an Indy Car engine supplier through six of seven complete engine designs, leading to their first pole position in 1999 and second win in 2000 under the PPI Motorsports' banner. These successes provided the foundation for TRD's expansion, management development and first open wheel championship under the ownership of Newman-Hass Racing and driven by PPI recruited and developed driver Cristiano da Matta.

During 1997, Toyota needed to provide a platform for the development of drivers in future CART/Indy Car participation. PPI led efforts to recruit an Atlantic Team Management crew and funding for the driver development program, which resulted in a Toyota Atlantic Championship in 1999 followed by Rookie-of-the-Year honors in 2000. The fundamental philosophies of the program ultimately provided an opportunity for many great drivers including Indy 500 and championship winner Dan Wheldon.

That same year, PPI began competing in the NSCS season with a different manufacturer and with support of a new sponsor in McDonald's. With a prominent sponsor like McDonald's on board, Wells soon attracted Procter and Gamble as they sponsored his car with their Tide brand. With less than two full seasons of NASCAR competition, Tide Racing scored the car owner his first NASCAR Cup win when Ricky Craven went to victory lane on October 15, 2001, at Martinsville Speedway. Next season, the team improved its final standings in the NASCAR Cup Series' owner points to 15th.

Wells' second win as a NASCAR team owner occurred March 16, 2003, at Darlington Raceway. Craven won the Carolina Dodge Dealers 400 by inches in a spectacular side-by-side finish with Kurt Busch. The margin of victory (.002 seconds) was recognizably one of the closest finishes in NASCAR history.

== Post-PPI ==
The 2005 season marked a monumental year for Wells as his organization celebrated its 25th anniversary in racing. After 28 years of ownership, the Pomona, California-native bid farewell to his role in a sport he is still most passionate about today.

After the closing of PPI, Wells was sought out by Michael Waltrip Racing co-owner Rob Kauffman to continue working in racing via the business operations of MWR. After four seasons at MWR that included two NASCAR Cup wins with David Reutimann and a K&N Pro Series East championship with Ryan Truex. On July 25, 2011, it was announced that Wells would leave Michael Waltrip Racing, where he had moved up to vice president and chief operating officer.

Since moving on from MWR, Wells has focused on a consultancy role primarily in motorsports, amongst other fields. Under the banner of LNGA Consulting, Wells has worked with NASCAR teams such as Germain Racing, Furniture Row Racing, and JTG Daugherty Racing, assisted in the start-up business operations of Haas F1, and continued to work with Toyota Racing Development.

On July 26, 2023, it was announced that Wells would join Legacy Motor Club as the team's CEO.
