= 2026 Cook Out 400 (Richmond) =

NASCAR stock car race held in Richmond, Virginia, U.S.

Race details
- Race 24 of 36 in the 2026 NASCAR Cup Series
- Date: August 15, 2026
- Location: Richmond Raceway in Richmond, Virginia
- Course: Permanent racing facility
- Course length: 0.75 miles (1.207 km)
- Distance: 400 laps, 300 mi (480 km)
- Average speed: 98.343 miles per hour (158.268 km/h)

Pole position
Driver	Ryan Blaney	Team Penske
- Time: 22.225

Most laps led
Driver	Chase Briscoe	Joe Gibbs Racing
- Laps: 171

Fastest lap
Driver	Ryan Blaney	Team Penske
- Time: 22.738

Winner
No. 22	Joey Logano	Team Penske

Television in the United States
- Network: USA
- Announcers: Leigh Diffey, Jeff Burton, and Steve Letarte
- Nielsen ratings: 1.516 million

Radio in the United States
- Radio: MRN
- Booth announcers: Alex Hayden, Mike Bagley, and Todd Gordon
- Turn announcers: Dave Moody (Backstretch)

The 2026 Cook Out 400 was a NASCAR Cup Series race that was held on August 15, 2026, at Richmond Raceway in Richmond, Virginia. Contested over 400 laps on the 0.75-mile (1.21 km) D-shaped oval, it was the 24th race of the 2026 NASCAR Cup Series season.

Joey Logano won the race. Chase Briscoe finished 2nd, and Austin Cindric finished 3rd. Denny Hamlin and Chase Elliott rounded out the top five, and Kyle Larson, Christopher Bell, Josh Berry, William Byron, and Alex Bowman rounded out the top ten.

== Report ==
=== Background ===
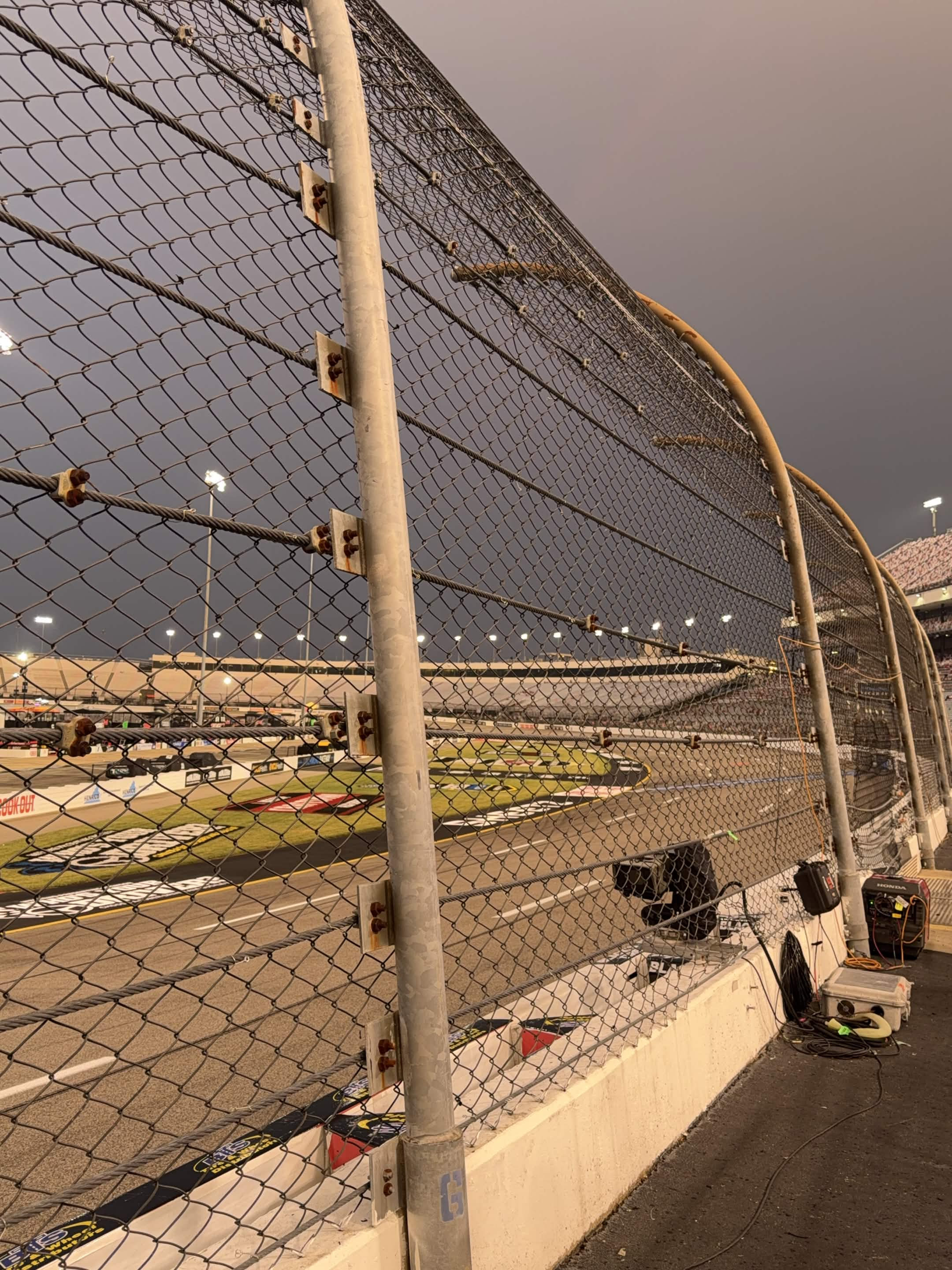
Richmond Raceway, the track where the race was held.

Richmond Raceway (RR) is a 0.75 miles (1.21 km), D-shaped, asphalt race track located just outside Richmond, Virginia in unincorporated Henrico County. It hosts the NASCAR Cup Series, NASCAR Xfinity Series and the NASCAR Craftsman Truck Series. Known as "America's premier short track", it has formerly hosted events such as the International Race of Champions, Denny Hamlin Short Track Showdown, and the USAC sprint car series. Due to Richmond Raceway's unique "D" shape which allows drivers to reach high speeds, Richmond has long been known as a short track that races like a superspeedway. With its multiple racing grooves, and proclivity for contact Richmond is a favorite among NASCAR drivers and fans.

==== Entry list ====
- (R) denotes rookie driver.
- (i) denotes driver who is ineligible for series driver points.

No.	Driver	Team	Manufacturer
1	Ross Chastain	Trackhouse Racing	Chevrolet
2	Austin Cindric	Team Penske	Ford
3	Austin Dillon	Richard Childress Racing	Chevrolet
4	Noah Gragson	Front Row Motorsports	Ford
5	Kyle Larson	Hendrick Motorsports	Chevrolet
6	Brad Keselowski	RFK Racing	Ford
7	Daniel Suárez	Spire Motorsports	Chevrolet
9	Chase Elliott	Hendrick Motorsports	Chevrolet
10	Ty Dillon	Kaulig Racing	Chevrolet
11	Denny Hamlin	Joe Gibbs Racing	Toyota
12	Ryan Blaney	Team Penske	Ford
16	A. J. Allmendinger	Kaulig Racing	Chevrolet
17	Chris Buescher	RFK Racing	Ford
19	Chase Briscoe	Joe Gibbs Racing	Toyota
20	Christopher Bell	Joe Gibbs Racing	Toyota
21	Josh Berry	Wood Brothers Racing	Ford
22	Joey Logano	Team Penske	Ford
23	Bubba Wallace	23XI Racing	Toyota
24	William Byron	Hendrick Motorsports	Chevrolet
33	Austin Hill (i)	Richard Childress Racing	Chevrolet
34	Todd Gilliland	Front Row Motorsports	Ford
35	Riley Herbst	23XI Racing	Toyota
38	Zane Smith	Front Row Motorsports	Ford
41	Cole Custer	Haas Factory Team	Ford
42	John Hunter Nemechek	Legacy Motor Club	Toyota
43	Erik Jones	Legacy Motor Club	Toyota
45	Tyler Reddick	23XI Racing	Toyota
47	Ricky Stenhouse Jr.	Hyak Motorsports	Chevrolet
48	Alex Bowman	Hendrick Motorsports	Chevrolet
51	Cody Ware	Rick Ware Racing	Ford
54	Ty Gibbs	Joe Gibbs Racing	Toyota
60	Ryan Preece	RFK Racing	Ford
66	Josh Bilicki (i)	Garage 66	Ford
71	Michael McDowell	Spire Motorsports	Chevrolet
77	Carson Hocevar	Spire Motorsports	Chevrolet
88	Connor Zilisch (R)	Trackhouse Racing	Chevrolet
97	Shane van Gisbergen	Trackhouse Racing	Chevrolet
Official entry list

== Practice ==
Daniel Suárez was the fastest in the practice session with a time of 22.889 seconds and a speed of 117.960 mph (189.838 km/h).

=== Practice results ===
Pos	No.	Driver	Team	Manufacturer	Time	Speed
1	7	Daniel Suárez	Spire Motorsports	Chevrolet	22.889	117.960
2	43	Erik Jones	Legacy Motor Club	Toyota	22.890	117.955
3	2	Austin Cindric	Team Penske	Ford	22.905	117.878
Official practice results

== Qualifying ==
Ryan Blaney scored the pole for the race with a time of 22.225 and a speed of 121.485 mph (195.511 km/h).

=== Qualifying results ===
Pos	No.	Driver	Team	Manufacturer	Time	Speed
1	12	Ryan Blaney	Team Penske	Ford	22.225	121.485
2	19	Chase Briscoe	Joe Gibbs Racing	Toyota	22.275	121.212
3	21	Josh Berry	Wood Brothers Racing	Ford	22.281	121.179
4	54	Ty Gibbs	Joe Gibbs Racing	Toyota	22.295	121.103
5	24	William Byron	Hendrick Motorsports	Chevrolet	22.347	120.822
6	60	Ryan Preece	RFK Racing	Ford	22.435	120.348
7	23	Bubba Wallace	23XI Racing	Toyota	22.450	120.267
8	20	Christopher Bell	Joe Gibbs Racing	Toyota	22.459	120.219
9	6	Brad Keselowski	RFK Racing	Ford	22.491	120.048
10	22	Joey Logano	Team Penske	Ford	22.495	120.027
11	88	Connor Zilisch (R)	Trackhouse Racing	Chevrolet	22.510	119.947
12	42	John Hunter Nemechek	Legacy Motor Club	Toyota	22.514	119.925
13	9	Chase Elliott	Hendrick Motorsports	Chevrolet	22.524	119.872
14	11	Denny Hamlin	Joe Gibbs Racing	Toyota	22.532	119.830
15	16	A. J. Allmendinger	Kaulig Racing	Chevrolet	22.546	119.755
16	3	Austin Dillon	Richard Childress Racing	Chevrolet	22.575	119.601
17	35	Riley Herbst	23XI Racing	Toyota	22.577	119.591
18	1	Ross Chastain	Trackhouse Racing	Chevrolet	22.579	119.580
19	17	Chris Buescher	RFK Racing	Ford	22.606	119.437
20	7	Daniel Suárez	Spire Motorsports	Chevrolet	22.622	119.353
21	43	Erik Jones	Legacy Motor Club	Toyota	22.631	119.305
22	77	Carson Hocevar	Spire Motorsports	Chevrolet	22.632	119.300
23	2	Austin Cindric	Team Penske	Ford	22.655	119.179
24	38	Zane Smith	Front Row Motorsports	Ford	22.665	119.126
25	48	Alex Bowman	Hendrick Motorsports	Chevrolet	22.684	119.027
26	71	Michael McDowell	Spire Motorsports	Chevrolet	22.690	118.995
27	34	Todd Gilliland	Front Row Motorsports	Ford	22.712	118.880
28	47	Ricky Stenhouse Jr.	Hyak Motorsports	Chevrolet	22.724	118.817
29	41	Cole Custer	Haas Factory Team	Chevrolet	22.726	118.807
30	5	Kyle Larson	Hendrick Motorsports	Chevrolet	22.742	118.723
31	97	Shane van Gisbergen	Trackhouse Racing	Chevrolet	22.773	118.561
32	45	Tyler Reddick	23XI Racing	Toyota	22.776	118.546
33	33	Austin Hill (i)	Richard Childress Racing	Chevrolet	22.780	118.525
34	10	Ty Dillon	Kaulig Racing	Chevrolet	22.789	118.478
35	4	Noah Gragson	Front Row Motorsports	Ford	22.858	118.121
36	66	Josh Bilicki (i)	Garage 66	Ford	23.302	115.870
37	51	Cody Ware	Rick Ware Racing	Chevrolet	0.000	0.000
Official qualifying results

== Race ==
=== Race results ===
==== Stage Results ====
Stage One Laps: 70

Pos	No	Driver	Team	Manufacturer	Points
1	12	Ryan Blaney	Team Penske	Ford	10
2	19	Chase Briscoe	Joe Gibbs Racing	Toyota	9
3	22	Joey Logano	Team Penske	Ford	8
4	2	Austin Cindric	Team Penske	Ford	7
5	21	Josh Berry	Wood Brothers Racing	Ford	6
6	23	Bubba Wallace	23XI Racing	Toyota	5
7	11	Denny Hamlin	Joe Gibbs Racing	Toyota	4
8	20	Christopher Bell	Joe Gibbs Racing	Toyota	3
9	9	Chase Elliott	Hendrick Motorsports	Chevrolet	2
10	24	William Byron	Hendrick Motorsports	Chevrolet	1

Stage Two Laps: 160

Pos	No	Driver	Team	Manufacturer	Points
1	22	Joey Logano	Team Penske	Ford	10
2	11	Denny Hamlin	Joe Gibbs Racing	Toyota	9
3	19	Chase Briscoe	Joe Gibbs Racing	Toyota	8
4	2	Austin Cindric	Team Penske	Ford	7
5	12	Ryan Blaney	Team Penske	Ford	6
6	21	Josh Berry	Wood Brothers Racing	Ford	5
7	9	Chase Elliott	Hendrick Motorsports	Chevrolet	4
8	20	Christopher Bell	Joe Gibbs Racing	Toyota	3
9	45	Tyler Reddick	23XI Racing	Toyota	2
10	24	William Byron	Hendrick Motorsports	Chevrolet	1

=== Final Stage Results ===
Stage Three Laps: 170

Pos	Grid	No	Driver	Team	Manufacturer	Laps	Points
1	10	22	Joey Logano	Team Penske	Ford	400	73
2	2	19	Chase Briscoe	Joe Gibbs Racing	Toyota	400	52
3	23	2	Austin Cindric	Team Penske	Ford	400	48
4	14	11	Denny Hamlin	Joe Gibbs Racing	Toyota	400	46
5	13	9	Chase Elliott	Hendrick Motorsports	Chevrolet	400	38
6	30	5	Kyle Larson	Hendrick Motorsports	Chevrolet	400	31
7	8	20	Christopher Bell	Joe Gibbs Racing	Toyota	400	36
8	3	21	Josh Berry	Wood Brothers Racing	Ford	400	40
9	5	24	William Byron	Hendrick Motorsports	Chevrolet	400	30
10	25	48	Alex Bowman	Hendrick Motorsports	Chevrolet	400	27
11	32	45	Tyler Reddick	23XI Racing	Toyota	400	28
12	18	1	Ross Chastain	Trackhouse Racing	Chevrolet	399	25
13	1	12	Ryan Blaney	Team Penske	Ford	399	41
14	31	97	Shane van Gisbergen	Trackhouse Racing	Chevrolet	399	23
15	4	54	Ty Gibbs	Joe Gibbs Racing	Toyota	399	22
16	20	7	Daniel Suárez	Spire Motorsports	Chevrolet	399	21
17	6	60	Ryan Preece	RFK Racing	Ford	398	20
18	35	4	Noah Gragson	Front Row Motorsports	Ford	398	19
19	16	3	Austin Dillon	Richard Childress Racing	Chevrolet	398	18
20	7	23	Bubba Wallace	23XI Racing	Toyota	398	22
21	19	17	Chris Buescher	RFK Racing	Ford	398	16
22	12	42	John Hunter Nemechek	Legacy Motor Club	Toyota	398	15
23	33	33	Austin Hill (i)	Richard Childress Racing	Chevrolet	397	0
24	17	35	Riley Herbst	23XI Racing	Toyota	397	13
25	11	88	Connor Zilisch (R)	Trackhouse Racing	Chevrolet	397	12
26	9	6	Brad Keselowski	RFK Racing	Ford	397	11
27	21	43	Erik Jones	Legacy Motor Club	Toyota	396	10
28	26	71	Michael McDowell	Spire Motorsports	Chevrolet	396	9
29	29	41	Cole Custer	Haas Factory Team	Chevrolet	396	8
30	27	34	Todd Gilliland	Front Row Motorsports	Ford	396	7
31	28	47	Ricky Stenhouse Jr.	Hyak Motorsports	Chevrolet	396	6
32	34	10	Ty Dillon	Kaulig Racing	Chevrolet	394	5
33	15	16	A. J. Allmendinger	Kaulig Racing	Chevrolet	394	4
34	37	51	Cody Ware	Rick Ware Racing	Chevrolet	392	3
35	36	66	Josh Bilicki (i)	Garage 66	Ford	391	0
36	24	38	Zane Smith	Front Row Motorsports	Ford	366	1
37	22	77	Carson Hocevar	Spire Motorsports	Chevrolet	280	1
Official race results

=== Race statistics ===
- Lead changes: 29 among 10 different drivers
- Cautions/Laps: 4 for 31
- Red flags: 0
- Time of race: 3 hours, 3 minutes and 2 seconds
- Average speed: 98.343 miles per hour (158.268 km/h)

== Media ==
=== Television ===
USA covered the race on the television side. Leigh Diffey, Jeff Burton and Steve Letarte called the race from the broadcast booth. Dave Burns, Kim Coon, and Marty Snider handled pit road, while Trevor Bayne provided analysis from the pace car for the television side.

USA
Booth announcers	Pit reporters	Pace car
Lap-by-lap: Leigh Diffey; Color-commentator: Jeff Burton; Color-commentator: Steve Letarte	Dave Burns; Kim Coon; Marty Snider	Trevor Bayne

=== Radio ===
The Motor Racing Network had the radio call for the race, which was also simulcast on Sirius XM NASCAR Radio. Alex Hayden, Mike Bagley and Todd Gordon called the race from the broadcast booth for MRN when the field races through the front straightaway. Dave Moody called the race from a platform when the field races down the backstraightaway. MRN Lead Pit Reporter Steve Post, Jacklyn Drake and Jason Toy called the action for MRN from pit lane.

MRN Radio
Booth announcers	Turn announcer	Pit reporters
Lead announcer: Alex Hayden; Announcer: Mike Bagley; Announcer: Todd Gordon	Backstretch: Dave Moody	Steve Post; Jacklyn Drake; Jason Toy

== Standings after the race ==
Drivers' Championship standings

	Pos	Driver	Points
	1	Denny Hamlin	969
1	2	Ryan Blaney	854 (–115)
1	3	Ty Gibbs	842 (–127)
	4	Tyler Reddick	831 (–138)
	5	Chase Briscoe	715 (–254)
1	6	Chase Elliott	695 (–274)
1	7	Christopher Bell	695 (–274)
2	8	Kyle Larson	660 (–309)
4	9	Joey Logano	659 (–310)
1	10	Chris Buescher	653 (–316)
3	11	Carson Hocevar	645 (–324)
1	12	William Byron	630 (–339)
1	13	Daniel Suárez	618 (–351)
	14	Bubba Wallace	587 (–382)
1	15	Austin Cindric	574 (–395)
1	16	Shane van Gisbergen	567 (–402)
Official driver's standings

Manufacturers' Championship standings

Pos	Manufacturer	Points
1	Toyota	1,107
2	Chevrolet	928 (–179)
3	Ford	855 (–252)

- Note: Only the first 16 positions are included for the driver standings.
- . – Driver has clinched a position in the Cup Series Chase.

Previous race: 2026 Iowa Corn 350	NASCAR Cup Series; 2026 season	Next race: 2026 Dollar Tree 301
