= 2023 Cook Out Southern 500 =

NASCAR Cup Series race

Race details
- Race 27 of 36 in the 2023 NASCAR Cup Series
- Date: September 3, 2023
- Location: Darlington Raceway in Darlington, South Carolina
- Course: Permanent racing facility
- Course length: 1.366 miles (2.198 km)
- Distance: 367 laps, 501.322 mi (806.666 km)
- Average speed: 120.906 miles per hour (194.579 km/h)

Pole position
Driver	Christopher Bell	Joe Gibbs Racing
- Time: 29.065

Most laps led
Driver	Denny Hamlin	Joe Gibbs Racing
- Laps: 177

Winner
No. 5	Kyle Larson	Hendrick Motorsports

Television in the United States
- Network: USA
- Announcers: Rick Allen, Jeff Burton, Steve Letarte, Dale Earnhardt Jr., Dale Jarrett and Kyle Petty

Radio in the United States
- Radio: MRN
- Booth announcers: Alex Hayden, Jeff Striegle and Todd Gordon
- Turn announcers: Dave Moody (1–2) and Jason Toy (3–4)

The 2023 Cook Out Southern 500, the 74th running of the event, was a NASCAR Cup Series race held on September 3, 2023, at Darlington Raceway in Darlington, South Carolina. Contested over 367 laps on the 1.366-mile (2.198 km) egg-shaped oval, it was the 27th race of the 2023 NASCAR Cup Series season, the first race of the 2023 NASCAR playoffs, and the first race of the Round of 16.

== Report ==
=== Background ===
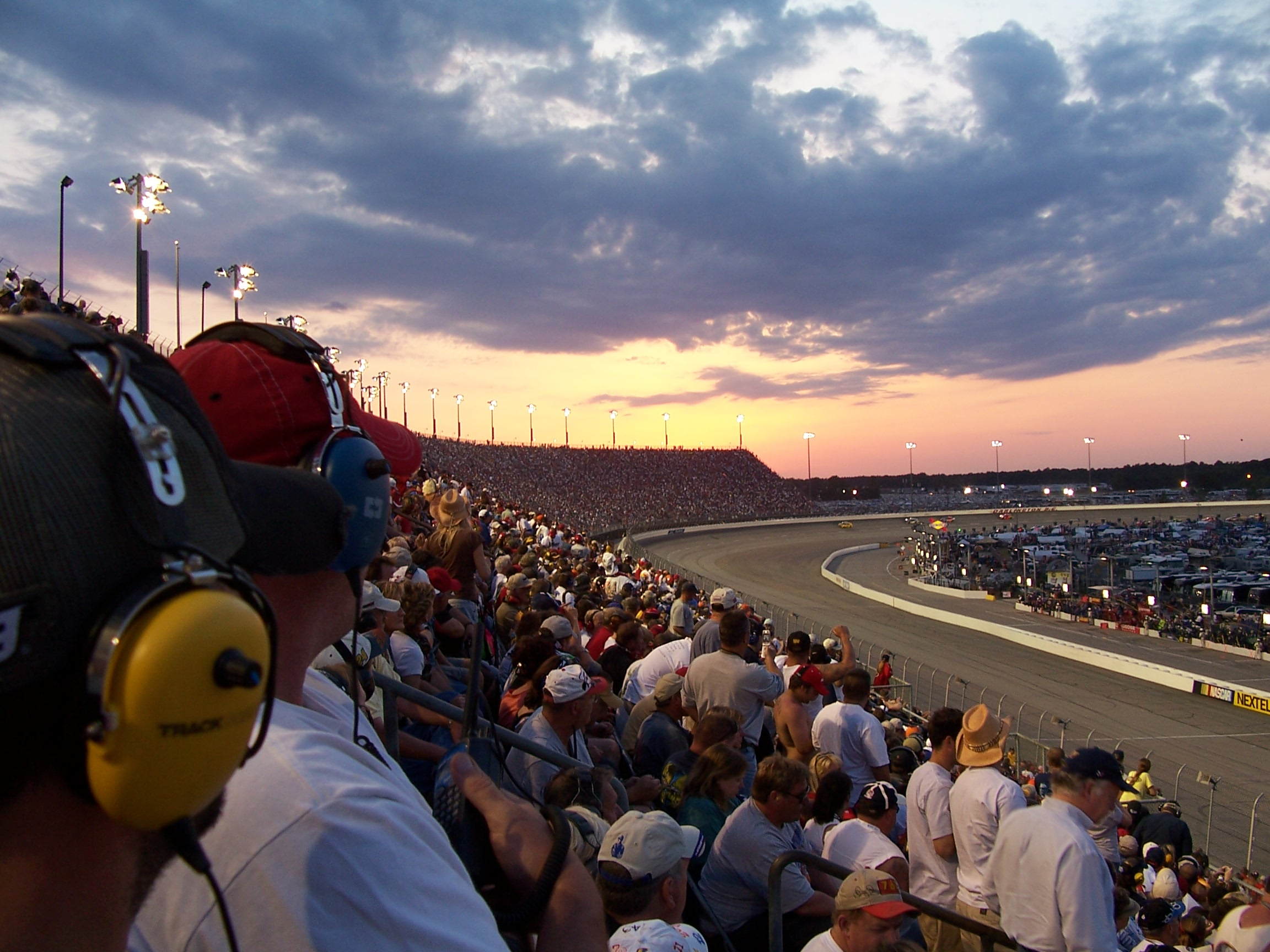
Darlington Raceway where the race was held.

Darlington Raceway is a race track built for NASCAR racing located near Darlington, South Carolina. It is nicknamed "The Lady in Black" and "The Track Too Tough to Tame" by many NASCAR fans and drivers and advertised as "A NASCAR Tradition." It is of a unique, somewhat egg-shaped design, an oval with the ends of very different configurations, a condition which supposedly arose from the proximity of one end of the track to a minnow pond the owner refused to relocate. This situation makes it very challenging for the crews to set up their cars' handling in a way that is effective at both ends.

==== Entry list ====
- (R) denotes rookie driver.
- (i) denotes the driver ineligible for series driver points.
- (P) denotes playoff driver.
- (OP) denotes owner’s playoffs car.

No.	Driver	Team	Manufacturer
1	Ross Chastain (P)	Trackhouse Racing	Chevrolet
2	Austin Cindric	Team Penske	Ford
3	Austin Dillon	Richard Childress Racing	Chevrolet
4	Kevin Harvick (P)	Stewart-Haas Racing	Ford
5	Kyle Larson (P)	Hendrick Motorsports	Chevrolet
6	Brad Keselowski (P)	RFK Racing	Ford
7	Corey LaJoie	Spire Motorsports	Chevrolet
8	Kyle Busch (P)	Richard Childress Racing	Chevrolet
9	Chase Elliott (OP)	Hendrick Motorsports	Chevrolet
10	Aric Almirola	Stewart-Haas Racing	Ford
11	Denny Hamlin (P)	Joe Gibbs Racing	Toyota
12	Ryan Blaney (P)	Team Penske	Ford
14	Chase Briscoe	Stewart-Haas Racing	Ford
15	J. J. Yeley (i)	Rick Ware Racing	Ford
16	A. J. Allmendinger	Kaulig Racing	Chevrolet
17	Chris Buescher (P)	RFK Racing	Ford
19	Martin Truex Jr. (P)	Joe Gibbs Racing	Toyota
20	Christopher Bell (P)	Joe Gibbs Racing	Toyota
21	Harrison Burton	Wood Brothers Racing	Ford
22	Joey Logano (P)	Team Penske	Ford
23	Bubba Wallace (P)	23XI Racing	Toyota
24	William Byron (P)	Hendrick Motorsports	Chevrolet
31	Justin Haley	Kaulig Racing	Chevrolet
34	Michael McDowell (P)	Front Row Motorsports	Ford
38	Todd Gilliland	Front Row Motorsports	Ford
41	Ryan Preece	Stewart-Haas Racing	Ford
42	Carson Hocevar (i)	Legacy Motor Club	Chevrolet
43	Erik Jones	Legacy Motor Club	Chevrolet
45	Tyler Reddick (P)	23XI Racing	Toyota
47	Ricky Stenhouse Jr. (P)	JTG Daugherty Racing	Chevrolet
48	Alex Bowman	Hendrick Motorsports	Chevrolet
51	Ryan Newman	Rick Ware Racing	Ford
54	Ty Gibbs (R)	Joe Gibbs Racing	Toyota
77	Ty Dillon	Spire Motorsports	Chevrolet
78	B. J. McLeod	Live Fast Motorsports	Chevrolet
99	Daniel Suárez	Trackhouse Racing	Chevrolet
Official entry list

== Practice ==
Christopher Bell was the fastest in the practice session with a time of 29.197 seconds and a speed of 168.428 mph (271.059 km/h).

=== Practice results ===
Pos	No.	Driver	Team	Manufacturer	Time	Speed
1	20	Christopher Bell (P)	Joe Gibbs Racing	Toyota	29.197	168.428
2	34	Michael McDowell (P)	Front Row Motorsports	Ford	29.398	167.277
3	47	Ricky Stenhouse Jr. (P)	JTG Daugherty Racing	Chevrolet	29.438	167.049
Official practice results

== Qualifying ==
Christopher Bell scored the pole for the race with a time of 29.065 and a speed of 169.193 mph (272.290 km/h).

=== Qualifying results ===
Pos	No.	Driver	Team	Manufacturer	R1	R2
1	20	Christopher Bell (P)	Joe Gibbs Racing	Toyota	28.985	29.065
2	11	Denny Hamlin (P)	Joe Gibbs Racing	Toyota	28.907	29.091
3	45	Tyler Reddick (P)	23XI Racing	Toyota	28.800	29.103
4	12	Ryan Blaney (P)	Team Penske	Ford	28.870	29.224
5	6	Brad Keselowski (P)	RFK Racing	Ford	29.078	29.232
6	22	Joey Logano (P)	Team Penske	Ford	28.924	29.245
7	4	Kevin Harvick (P)	Stewart-Haas Racing	Ford	29.155	29.249
8	17	Chris Buescher (P)	RFK Racing	Ford	28.944	29.278
9	34	Michael McDowell (P)	Front Row Motorsports	Ford	29.177	29.290
10	10	Aric Almirola	Stewart-Haas Racing	Ford	29.161	29.406
11	8	Kyle Busch (P)	Richard Childress Racing	Chevrolet	29.030	—
12	14	Chase Briscoe	Stewart-Haas Racing	Ford	29.034	—
13	9	Chase Elliott (OP)	Hendrick Motorsports	Chevrolet	29.095	—
14	2	Austin Cindric	Team Penske	Ford	29.108	—
15	42	Carson Hocevar (i)	Legacy Motor Club	Chevrolet	29.154	—
16	16	A. J. Allmendinger	Kaulig Racing	Chevrolet	29.168	—
17	54	Ty Gibbs (R)	Joe Gibbs Racing	Toyota	29.192	—
18	5	Kyle Larson (P)	Hendrick Motorsports	Chevrolet	29.200	—
19	23	Bubba Wallace (P)	23XI Racing	Toyota	29.206	—
20	43	Erik Jones	Legacy Motor Club	Chevrolet	29.215	—
21	99	Daniel Suárez	Trackhouse Racing	Chevrolet	29.236	—
22	7	Corey LaJoie	Spire Motorsports	Chevrolet	29.252	—
23	24	William Byron (P)	Hendrick Motorsports	Chevrolet	29.256	—
24	48	Alex Bowman	Hendrick Motorsports	Chevrolet	29.284	—
25	47	Ricky Stenhouse Jr. (P)	JTG Daugherty Racing	Chevrolet	29.299	—
26	77	Ty Dillon	Spire Motorsports	Chevrolet	29.306	—
27	1	Ross Chastain (P)	Trackhouse Racing	Chevrolet	29.337	—
28	3	Austin Dillon	Richard Childress Racing	Chevrolet	29.410	—
29	31	Justin Haley	Kaulig Racing	Chevrolet	29.447	—
30	38	Todd Gilliland	Front Row Motorsports	Ford	29.452	—
31	19	Martin Truex Jr. (P)	Joe Gibbs Racing	Toyota	29.462	—
32	21	Harrison Burton	Wood Brothers Racing	Ford	29.477	—
33	15	J. J. Yeley (i)	Rick Ware Racing	Ford	29.478	—
34	41	Ryan Preece	Stewart-Haas Racing	Ford	29.574	—
35	51	Ryan Newman	Rick Ware Racing	Ford	29.711	—
36	78	B. J. McLeod	Live Fast Motorsports	Chevrolet	29.989	—
Official qualifying results

== Race ==
=== Race results ===
==== Stage results ====
Stage One Laps: 115

Pos	No	Driver	Team	Manufacturer	Points
1	11	Denny Hamlin (P)	Joe Gibbs Racing	Toyota	10
2	45	Tyler Reddick (P)	23XI Racing	Toyota	9
3	5	Kyle Larson (P)	Hendrick Motorsports	Chevrolet	8
4	4	Kevin Harvick (P)	Stewart-Haas Racing	Ford	7
5	12	Ryan Blaney (P)	Team Penske	Ford	6
6	6	Brad Keselowski (P)	RFK Racing	Ford	5
7	9	Chase Elliott (OP)	Hendrick Motorsports	Chevrolet	4
8	20	Christopher Bell (P)	Joe Gibbs Racing	Toyota	3
9	17	Chris Buescher (P)	RFK Racing	Ford	2
10	10	Aric Almirola	Stewart-Haas Racing	Ford	1
Official stage one results

Stage Two Laps: 115

Pos	No	Driver	Team	Manufacturer	Points
1	11	Denny Hamlin (P)	Joe Gibbs Racing	Toyota	10
2	5	Kyle Larson (P)	Hendrick Motorsports	Chevrolet	9
3	43	Erik Jones	Legacy Motor Club	Chevrolet	8
4	45	Tyler Reddick (P)	23XI Racing	Toyota	7
5	24	William Byron (P)	Hendrick Motorsports	Chevrolet	6
6	8	Kyle Busch (P)	Richard Childress Racing	Chevrolet	5
7	12	Ryan Blaney (P)	Team Penske	Ford	4
8	3	Austin Dillon	Richard Childress Racing	Chevrolet	3
9	6	Brad Keselowski (P)	RFK Racing	Ford	2
10	47	Ricky Stenhouse Jr. (P)	JTG Daugherty Racing	Chevrolet	1
Official stage two results

=== Final Stage results ===
Stage Three Laps: 137

Pos	Grid	No	Driver	Team	Manufacturer	Laps	Points
1	18	5	Kyle Larson (P)	Hendrick Motorsports	Chevrolet	367	57
2	3	45	Tyler Reddick (P)	23XI Racing	Toyota	367	51
3	8	17	Chris Buescher (P)	RFK Racing	Ford	367	36
4	23	24	William Byron (P)	Hendrick Motorsports	Chevrolet	367	39
5	27	1	Ross Chastain (P)	Trackhouse Racing	Chevrolet	367	32
6	5	6	Brad Keselowski (P)	RFK Racing	Ford	367	38
7	19	23	Bubba Wallace (P)	23XI Racing	Toyota	367	30
8	13	9	Chase Elliott (OP)	Hendrick Motorsports	Chevrolet	367	33
9	4	12	Ryan Blaney (P)	Team Penske	Ford	367	38
10	20	43	Erik Jones	Legacy Motor Club	Chevrolet	367	35
11	11	8	Kyle Busch (P)	Richard Childress Racing	Chevrolet	367	31
12	6	22	Joey Logano (P)	Team Penske	Ford	367	25
13	16	16	A. J. Allmendinger	Kaulig Racing	Chevrolet	367	24
14	10	10	Aric Almirola	Stewart-Haas Racing	Ford	367	24
15	12	14	Chase Briscoe	Stewart-Haas Racing	Ford	367	22
16	25	47	Ricky Stenhouse Jr. (P)	JTG Daugherty Racing	Chevrolet	367	22
17	15	42	Carson Hocevar (i)	Legacy Motor Club	Chevrolet	367	0
18	31	19	Martin Truex Jr. (P)	Joe Gibbs Racing	Toyota	367	19
19	7	4	Kevin Harvick (P)	Stewart-Haas Racing	Ford	367	25
20	28	3	Austin Dillon	Richard Childress Racing	Chevrolet	367	20
21	17	54	Ty Gibbs (R)	Joe Gibbs Racing	Toyota	367	16
22	22	7	Corey LaJoie	Spire Motorsports	Chevrolet	367	15
23	1	20	Christopher Bell (P)	Joe Gibbs Racing	Toyota	366	17
24	29	31	Justin Haley	Kaulig Racing	Chevrolet	366	13
25	2	11	Denny Hamlin (P)	Joe Gibbs Racing	Toyota	366	32
26	30	38	Todd Gilliland	Front Row Motorsports	Ford	366	11
27	35	51	Ryan Newman	Rick Ware Racing	Ford	365	10
28	34	41	Ryan Preece	Stewart-Haas Racing	Ford	364	9
29	26	77	Ty Dillon	Spire Motorsports	Chevrolet	364	8
30	33	15	J. J. Yeley (i)	Rick Ware Racing	Ford	362	0
31	14	2	Austin Cindric	Team Penske	Ford	361	6
32	9	34	Michael McDowell (P)	Front Row Motorsports	Ford	329	5
33	24	48	Alex Bowman	Hendrick Motorsports	Chevrolet	322	4
34	21	99	Daniel Suárez	Trackhouse Racing	Chevrolet	320	3
35	32	21	Harrison Burton	Wood Brothers Racing	Ford	318	2
36	36	78	B. J. McLeod	Live Fast Motorsports	Chevrolet	210	1
Official race results

=== Race statistics ===
- Lead changes: 13 among 7 different drivers
- Cautions/Laps: 8 for 51 laps
- Red flags: 1 for 10 minutes
- Time of race: 4 hours, 8 minutes, and 47 seconds
- Average speed: 120.906 miles per hour (194.579 km/h)

== Media ==
=== Television ===
USA covered the race on the television side. Rick Allen, two–time Darlington winner Jeff Burton, Steve Letarte and Dale Earnhardt Jr. called Stages 1 and 3 of the race from the broadcast booth. Earnhardt Jr., Dale Jarrett and Kyle Petty called Stage 2 of the race from the broadcast booth. Dave Burns, Kim Coon and Marty Snider handled the pit road duties from pit lane.

USA
Booth announcers	Pit reporters
Lap-by-lap: Rick Allen; Color-commentator: Jeff Burton; Color-commentator: Steve Letarte; Color-commentator: Dale Earnhardt Jr. Throwback commentator: Dale Jarrett; Throwback commentator: Kyle Petty	Dave Burns; Kim Coon; Marty Snider

=== Radio ===
MRN had the radio call for the race, which was also simulcast on Sirius XM NASCAR Radio.

MRN Radio
Booth announcers	Turn announcers	Pit reporters
Lead announcer: Alex Hayden; Announcer: Jeff Striegle; Announcer: Todd Gordon	Turns 1 & 2: Dave Moody; Turns 3 & 4: Jason Toy	Steve Post; Chris Wilner; Brienne Pedigo; Alex Weaver

== Standings after the race ==
Drivers' Championship standings

	Pos	Driver	Points
	1	William Byron	2,075
4	2	Kyle Larson	2,074 (–1)
7	3	Tyler Reddick	2,060 (–15)
	4	Chris Buescher	2,057 (–18)
2	5	Denny Hamlin	2,057 (–18)
4	6	Martin Truex Jr.	2,055 (–20)
2	7	Kyle Busch	2,050 (–25)
1	8	Brad Keselowski	2,048 (–27)
1	9	Ryan Blaney	2,046 (–29)
2	10	Ross Chastain	2,043 (–32)
	11	Joey Logano	2,033 (–42)
5	12	Christopher Bell	2,031 (–44)
3	13	Bubba Wallace	2,030 (–45)
1	14	Kevin Harvick	2,029 (–46)
1	15	Ricky Stenhouse Jr.	2,027 (–48)
3	16	Michael McDowell	2,012 (–63)
Official driver's standings

Manufacturers' Championship standings

Pos	Manufacturer	Points
1	Chevrolet	1,000
2	Ford	929 (–71)
3	Toyota	927 (–73)

- Note: Only the first 16 positions are included for the driver standings.

Previous race: 2023 Coke Zero Sugar 400	NASCAR Cup Series; 2023 season	Next race: 2023 Hollywood Casino 400
