= 2022 Dixie Vodka 400 =

NASCAR Cup Series race

Race details
- Race 34 of 36 in the 2022 NASCAR Cup Series
- Date: October 23, 2022
- Location: Homestead-Miami Speedway in Homestead, Florida
- Course: Permanent racing facility
- Course length: 1.5 miles (2.4 km)
- Distance: 267 laps, 400.5 mi (640.8 km)
- Average speed: 129.612 miles per hour (208.590 km/h)

Pole position
Driver	William Byron	Hendrick Motorsports
- Time: 32.454

Most laps led
Driver	Kyle Larson	Hendrick Motorsports
- Laps: 199

Winner
No. 5	Kyle Larson	Hendrick Motorsports

Television in the United States
- Network: NBC
- Announcers: Rick Allen, Jeff Burton, Steve Letarte and Dale Earnhardt Jr.

Radio in the United States
- Radio: MRN
- Booth announcers: Alex Hayden, Jeff Striegle and Todd Gordon
- Turn announcers: Dave Moody (1 & 2) and Mike Bagley (3 & 4)

The 2022 Dixie Vodka 400 was a NASCAR Cup Series race held on October 23, 2022, at Homestead-Miami Speedway in Homestead, Florida. Contested over 267 laps on the 1.5 mile (2.4 km) oval, it was the 34th race of the 2022 NASCAR Cup Series season, the eighth race of the Playoffs, and the second race of the Round of 8.

== Report ==
=== Background ===
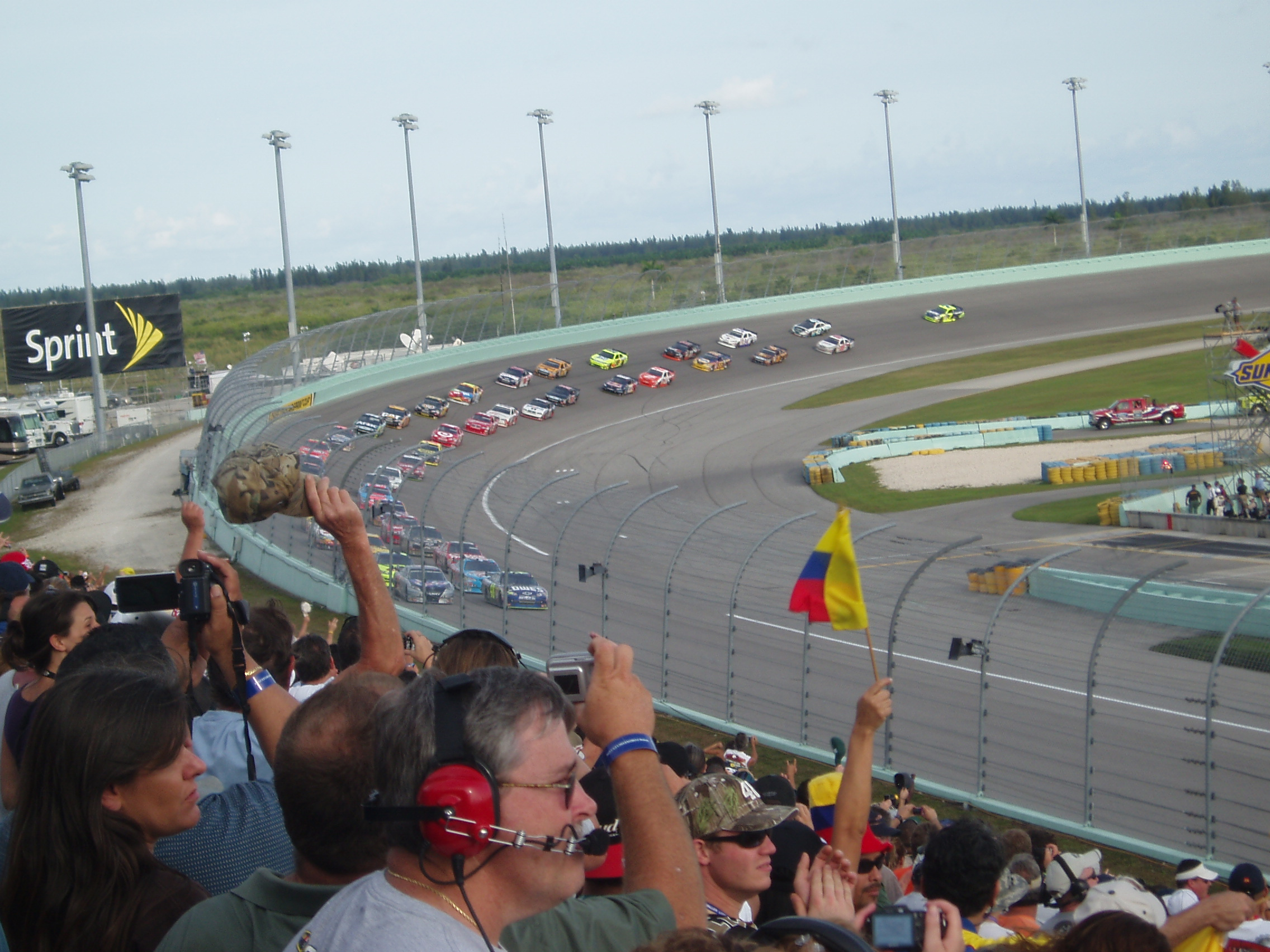
Homestead-Miami Speedway, the track where the race was held.

Homestead-Miami Speedway is a motor racing track located in Homestead, Florida. The track, which has several configurations, has promoted several series of racing, including NASCAR, the NTT IndyCar Series and the Grand-Am Rolex Sports Car Series

From 2002 to 2019, Homestead-Miami Speedway hosted the final race of the season in all three of NASCAR's series: the NASCAR Cup Series, Xfinity Series and Camping World Truck Series.

John Hunter Nemechek replaced Bubba Wallace for this race, as Wallace was parked by NASCAR for intentional retaliatory collision against Kyle Larson the previous race that collected playoff contender Christopher Bell.

==== Entry list ====
- (R) denotes rookie driver.
- (i) denotes driver who is ineligible for series driver points.

No.	Driver	Team	Manufacturer
1	Ross Chastain	Trackhouse Racing Team	Chevrolet
2	Austin Cindric (R)	Team Penske	Ford
3	Austin Dillon	Richard Childress Racing	Chevrolet
4	Kevin Harvick	Stewart-Haas Racing	Ford
5	Kyle Larson	Hendrick Motorsports	Chevrolet
6	Brad Keselowski	RFK Racing	Ford
7	Corey LaJoie	Spire Motorsports	Chevrolet
8	Tyler Reddick	Richard Childress Racing	Chevrolet
9	Chase Elliott	Hendrick Motorsports	Chevrolet
10	Aric Almirola	Stewart-Haas Racing	Ford
11	Denny Hamlin	Joe Gibbs Racing	Toyota
12	Ryan Blaney	Team Penske	Ford
14	Chase Briscoe	Stewart-Haas Racing	Ford
15	J. J. Yeley (i)	Rick Ware Racing	Ford
16	A. J. Allmendinger (i)	Kaulig Racing	Chevrolet
17	Chris Buescher	RFK Racing	Ford
18	Kyle Busch	Joe Gibbs Racing	Toyota
19	Martin Truex Jr.	Joe Gibbs Racing	Toyota
20	Christopher Bell	Joe Gibbs Racing	Toyota
21	Harrison Burton (R)	Wood Brothers Racing	Ford
22	Joey Logano	Team Penske	Ford
23	Ty Gibbs (i)	23XI Racing	Toyota
24	William Byron	Hendrick Motorsports	Chevrolet
31	Justin Haley	Kaulig Racing	Chevrolet
34	Michael McDowell	Front Row Motorsports	Ford
38	Todd Gilliland (R)	Front Row Motorsports	Ford
41	Cole Custer	Stewart-Haas Racing	Ford
42	Ty Dillon	Petty GMS Motorsports	Chevrolet
43	Erik Jones	Petty GMS Motorsports	Chevrolet
45	John Hunter Nemechek (i)	23XI Racing	Toyota
47	Ricky Stenhouse Jr.	JTG Daugherty Racing	Chevrolet
48	Noah Gragson (i)	Hendrick Motorsports	Chevrolet
51	Cody Ware	Rick Ware Racing	Ford
77	Landon Cassill (i)	Spire Motorsports	Chevrolet
78	B. J. McLeod (i)	Live Fast Motorsports	Ford
99	Daniel Suárez	Trackhouse Racing Team	Chevrolet
Official entry list

== Practice ==
John Hunter Nemechek was the fastest in the practice session with a time of 32.299 seconds and a speed of 167.188 mph (269.063 km/h).

=== Practice results ===
Pos	No.	Driver	Team	Manufacturer	Time	Speed
1	45	John Hunter Nemechek (i)	23XI Racing	Toyota	32.299	167.188
2	9	Chase Elliott	Hendrick Motorsports	Chevrolet	32.341	166.971
3	8	Tyler Reddick	Richard Childress Racing	Chevrolet	32.348	166.935
Official practice results

== Qualifying ==
William Byron scored the pole for the race with a time of 32.454 and a speed of 166.389 mph (267.777 km/h).

=== Qualifying results ===
Pos	No.	Driver	Team	Manufacturer	R1	R2
1	24	William Byron	Hendrick Motorsports	Chevrolet	32.358	32.454
2	20	Christopher Bell	Joe Gibbs Racing	Toyota	32.316	32.503
3	9	Chase Elliott	Hendrick Motorsports	Chevrolet	32.436	32.504
4	45	John Hunter Nemechek (i)	23XI Racing	Toyota	32.253	32.534
5	5	Kyle Larson	Hendrick Motorsports	Chevrolet	32.060	32.551
6	23	Ty Gibbs (i)	23XI Racing	Toyota	32.291	32.534
7	8	Tyler Reddick	Richard Childress Racing	Chevrolet	32.354	32.614
8	17	Chris Buescher	RFK Racing	Ford	32.318	32.627
9	6	Brad Keselowski	RFK Racing	Ford	32.364	32.662
10	16	A. J. Allmendinger (i)	Kaulig Racing	Chevrolet	32.364	32.751
11	18	Kyle Busch	Joe Gibbs Racing	Toyota	32.401	—
12	19	Martin Truex Jr.	Joe Gibbs Racing	Toyota	32.405	—
13	12	Ryan Blaney	Team Penske	Ford	32.424	—
14	11	Denny Hamlin	Joe Gibbs Racing	Toyota	32.448	—
15	31	Justin Haley	Kaulig Racing	Chevrolet	32.448	—
16	4	Kevin Harvick	Stewart-Haas Racing	Ford	32.476	—
17	22	Joey Logano	Team Penske	Ford	32.482	—
18	34	Michael McDowell	Front Row Motorsports	Ford	32.498	—
19	14	Chase Briscoe	Stewart-Haas Racing	Ford	32.531	—
20	1	Ross Chastain	Trackhouse Racing Team	Chevrolet	32.534	—
21	21	Harrison Burton (R)	Wood Brothers Racing	Ford	32.552	—
22	43	Erik Jones	Petty GMS Motorsports	Chevrolet	32.605	—
23	99	Daniel Suárez	Trackhouse Racing Team	Chevrolet	32.609	—
24	48	Noah Gragson (i)	Hendrick Motorsports	Chevrolet	32.617	—
25	41	Cole Custer	Stewart-Haas Racing	Ford	32.669	—
26	2	Austin Cindric (R)	Team Penske	Ford	32.728	—
27	47	Ricky Stenhouse Jr.	JTG Daugherty Racing	Chevrolet	32.734	—
28	10	Aric Almirola	Stewart-Haas Racing	Ford	32.761	—
29	38	Todd Gilliland (R)	Front Row Motorsports	Ford	32.776	—
30	42	Ty Dillon	Petty GMS Motorsports	Chevrolet	32.796	—
31	7	Corey LaJoie	Spire Motorsports	Chevrolet	32.854	—
32	3	Austin Dillon	Richard Childress Racing	Chevrolet	32.973	—
33	77	Landon Cassill (i)	Spire Motorsports	Chevrolet	33.124	—
34	15	J. J. Yeley (i)	Rick Ware Racing	Ford	33.127	—
35	78	B. J. McLeod (i)	Live Fast Motorsports	Ford	33.380	—
36	51	Cody Ware	Rick Ware Racing	Ford	33.615	—
Official qualifying results

== Race ==
=== Stage Results ===
Stage One Laps: 80

Pos	No	Driver	Team	Manufacturer	Points
1	5	Kyle Larson	Hendrick Motorsports	Chevrolet	10
2	24	William Byron	Hendrick Motorsports	Chevrolet	9
3	19	Martin Truex Jr.	Joe Gibbs Racing	Toyota	8
4	8	Tyler Reddick	Richard Childress Racing	Chevrolet	7
5	3	Austin Dillon	Richard Childress Racing	Chevrolet	6
6	16	A. J. Allmendinger (i)	Kaulig Racing	Chevrolet	0
7	6	Brad Keselowski	RFK Racing	Ford	4
8	9	Chase Elliott	Hendrick Motorsports	Chevrolet	3
9	12	Ryan Blaney	Team Penske	Ford	2
10	22	Joey Logano	Team Penske	Ford	1
Official stage one results

Stage Two Laps: 80

Pos	No	Driver	Team	Manufacturer	Points
1	5	Kyle Larson	Hendrick Motorsports	Chevrolet	10
2	19	Martin Truex Jr.	Joe Gibbs Racing	Toyota	9
3	24	William Byron	Hendrick Motorsports	Chevrolet	8
4	12	Ryan Blaney	Team Penske	Ford	7
5	6	Brad Keselowski	RFK Racing	Ford	6
6	9	Chase Elliott	Hendrick Motorsports	Chevrolet	5
7	99	Daniel Suárez	Trackhouse Racing Team	Chevrolet	4
8	1	Ross Chastain	Trackhouse Racing Team	Chevrolet	3
9	22	Joey Logano	Team Penske	Ford	2
10	11	Denny Hamlin	Joe Gibbs Racing	Toyota	1
Official stage two results

=== Final Stage Results ===
Stage Three Laps: 107

Pos	Grid	No	Driver	Team	Manufacturer	Laps	Points
1	5	5	Kyle Larson	Hendrick Motorsports	Chevrolet	267	60
2	20	1	Ross Chastain	Trackhouse Racing Team	Chevrolet	267	38
3	10	16	A. J. Allmendinger (i)	Kaulig Racing	Chevrolet	267	0
4	32	3	Austin Dillon	Richard Childress Racing	Chevrolet	267	39
5	9	6	Brad Keselowski	RFK Racing	Ford	267	42
6	12	19	Martin Truex Jr.	Joe Gibbs Racing	Toyota	267	48
7	14	11	Denny Hamlin	Joe Gibbs Racing	Toyota	267	31
8	16	4	Kevin Harvick	Stewart-Haas Racing	Ford	267	29
9	11	18	Kyle Busch	Joe Gibbs Racing	Toyota	267	28
10	23	99	Daniel Suárez	Trackhouse Racing Team	Chevrolet	267	31
11	2	20	Christopher Bell	Joe Gibbs Racing	Toyota	267	26
12	1	24	William Byron	Hendrick Motorsports	Chevrolet	267	42
13	8	17	Chris Buescher	RFK Racing	Ford	267	24
14	3	9	Chase Elliott	Hendrick Motorsports	Chevrolet	267	31
15	27	47	Ricky Stenhouse Jr.	JTG Daugherty Racing	Chevrolet	267	22
16	18	34	Michael McDowell	Front Row Motorsports	Ford	267	21
17	13	12	Ryan Blaney	Team Penske	Ford	267	29
18	17	22	Joey Logano	Team Penske	Ford	267	22
19	26	2	Austin Cindric (R)	Team Penske	Ford	267	18
20	21	21	Harrison Burton (R)	Wood Brothers Racing	Ford	267	17
21	28	10	Aric Almirola	Stewart-Haas Racing	Ford	267	16
22	6	23	Ty Gibbs (i)	23XI Racing	Toyota	267	0
23	31	7	Corey LaJoie	Spire Motorsports	Chevrolet	267	14
24	25	41	Cole Custer	Stewart-Haas Racing	Ford	266	13
25	24	48	Noah Gragson (i)	Hendrick Motorsports	Chevrolet	266	0
26	30	42	Ty Dillon	Petty GMS Motorsports	Chevrolet	266	11
27	4	45	John Hunter Nemechek (i)	23XI Racing	Toyota	266	0
28	15	31	Justin Haley	Kaulig Racing	Chevrolet	266	9
29	33	77	Landon Cassill (i)	Spire Motorsports	Chevrolet	266	0
30	22	43	Erik Jones	Petty GMS Motorsports	Chevrolet	264	7
31	29	38	Todd Gilliland (R)	Front Row Motorsports	Ford	264	6
32	34	15	J. J. Yeley (i)	Rick Ware Racing	Ford	263	0
33	35	78	B. J. McLeod (i)	Live Fast Motorsports	Ford	262	0
34	36	51	Cody Ware	Rick Ware Racing	Ford	262	3
35	7	8	Tyler Reddick	Richard Childress Racing	Chevrolet	242	9
36	19	14	Chase Briscoe	Stewart-Haas Racing	Ford	160	1
Official race results

=== Race statistics ===
- Lead changes: 11 among 5 different drivers
- Cautions/Laps: 5 for 30 laps
- Red flags: 0
- Time of race: 3 hours, 5 minutes and 24 seconds
- Average speed: 129.612 miles per hour (208.590 km/h)

== Media ==
=== Television ===
NBC Sports covered the race on the television side. Rick Allen, Jeff Burton, Steve Letarte and Dale Earnhardt Jr. called the race from the broadcast booth. Dave Burns, Kim Coon and Marty Snider handled the pit road duties from pit lane.

NBC
Booth announcers	Pit reporters
Lap-by-lap: Rick Allen; Color-commentator: Jeff Burton; Color-commentator: Steve Letarte; Color-commentator: Dale Earnhardt Jr.	Dave Burns; Kim Coon; Marty Snider

=== Radio ===
MRN had the radio call for the race, which was also simulcast on Sirius XM NASCAR Radio. Alex Hayden, Jeff Striegle, and former NASCAR crew chief Todd Gordon called the action of the race for MRN when the field raced down the front straightaway. Dave Moody covered the action for MRN in turns 1 & 2, and Mike Bagley had the call of the action from turns 3 & 4. Steve Post, Georgia Henneberry, Brienne Pedigo, and Jason Toy covered the action of the race for MRN on pit road.

MRN Radio
Booth announcers	Turn announcers	Pit reporters
Lead announcer: Alex Hayden; Announcer: Jeff Striegle; Announcer: Todd Gordon	Turns 1 & 2: Dave Moody; Turns 3 & 4: Mike Bagley	Steve Post; Georgia Henneberry; Brienne Pedigo; Jason Toy

== Standings after the race ==
Drivers' Championship standings

	Pos	Driver	Points
	1	Joey Logano	4,106
	2	Ross Chastain	4,101 (–5)
	3	Chase Elliott	4,093 (–13)
1	4	William Byron	4,087 (–19)
1	5	Denny Hamlin	4,082 (–24)
1	6	Ryan Blaney	4,069 (–37)
1	7	Christopher Bell	4,054 (–52)
2	8	Chase Briscoe	4,043 (–63)
	9	Kyle Larson	2,266 (–1,840)
	10	Daniel Suárez	2,230 (–1,876)
2	11	Austin Dillon	2,200 (–1,906)
1	12	Tyler Reddick	2,195 (–1,911)
1	13	Austin Cindric	2,187 (–1,919)
	14	Kyle Busch	2,186 (–1,920)
	15	Alex Bowman	2,104 (–2,002)
	16	Kevin Harvick	2,064 (–2,042)
Official driver's standings

Manufacturers' Championship standings

Pos	Manufacturer	Points
1	Chevrolet	1,255
2	Ford	1,176 (–76)
3	Toyota	1,118 (–137)

- Note: Only the first 16 positions are included for the driver standings.

Previous race: 2022 South Point 400	NASCAR Cup Series; 2022 season	Next race: 2022 Xfinity 500
