= Legacy Motor Club =

American stock car racing team

- Owner(s): Jimmie Johnson; Knighthead Capital Management; Strategic Ownership Group; Team Ambassadors: Maury Gallagher; Richard Petty
- Principal(s): Cal Wells (CEO); Michael Guttilla (President)
- Base: Statesville, North Carolina
- Series: NASCAR Cup Series; IndyCar Series
- Race drivers: Cup Series; 42. Josh Berry; 43. Erik Jones; 84. Riley Herbst; IndyCar Series; 31. Ryan Hunter-Reay (part-time)
- Manufacturer: Cup Series: Toyota; IndyCar Series: Chevrolet
- Opened: 2021
- Website: legacymotorclub.com

Career
- Debut: Cup Series: 2022 Daytona 500 (Daytona); IndyCar: 2026 Indianapolis 500 (Indianapolis); Extreme E: 2024 Desert X-Prix
- Latest race: Cup Series: 2026 Season Finale 400 (Homestead); IndyCar: 2026 Indianapolis 500 (Indianapolis); Extreme E: 2024 Hydro X-Prix
- Races competed: Total: 185; Cup Series: 180; IndyCar: 1 Extreme E: 4
- Drivers' Championships: Total: 0 Cup Series: 0 IndyCar: 0 Extreme E: 0
- Race victories: Total: 1 Cup Series: 1 IndyCar: 0 Extreme E: 0
- Pole positions: Total: 0 Cup Series: 0 IndyCar: 0 Extreme E: 0

Legacy Motor Club, formerly known as Petty GMS Motorsports, is an American professional stock car racing team owned by Jimmie Johnson with minority stakes by Richard Petty, Maury Gallagher, Knighthead Capital Management and a strategic ownership group.

The team competes in the NASCAR Cup Series where they currently field three Toyota Camry teams: the No. 42 full-time for Josh Berry, the No. 43 full-time for Erik Jones, and the No. 84 for Riley Herbst . The team has a technical alliance with Toyota Racing Development. In 2024, Legacy Motor Club competed in the electric off-road racing series Extreme E.

== History ==
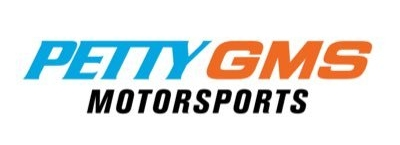
The team was known as Petty GMS Motorsports from December 2021 to January 2023.

On December 1, 2021, Maury Gallagher purchased a majority interest in the former Richard Petty Motorsports for US$19 million. The deal included both of RPM's charters; the No. 43 continued to operate with its charter while the second charter – which was leased to Rick Ware Racing for the No. 51 from 2019 to 2021 – was transferred to a second car for the team, the No. 42. Following the purchase, the team was renamed to Petty GMS Motorsports.

On September 16, 2022, it was reported that Petty GMS Motorsports would use Joe Gibbs Racing pit crews in 2023. On November 4, seven-time NASCAR champion Jimmie Johnson purchased an ownership stake in Petty GMS. Following the 2022 season, Richard Petty sold all shares of Petty GMS Motorsports to majority owner Gallagher.

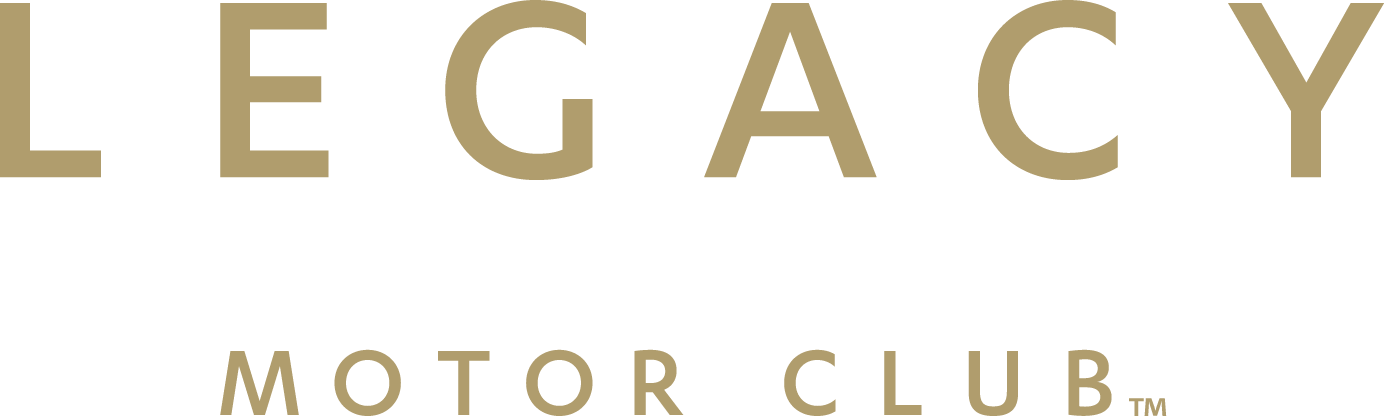
Logo of Legacy Motor Club used from 2023 to 2024

On January 11, 2023, the team announced the rebranding of the organization to Legacy Motor Club, marking the first time since the founding of NASCAR in 1949 that the Petty family has not had their name on a team in NASCAR's top series. On February 18, Petty announced that Johnson had taken control of the team's day-to-day operations, leaving him without decision-making power. On May 3, the team announced it will switch manufacturers from Chevrolet to Toyota in 2024. On July 26, Cal Wells was appointed as the team's CEO. On August 25, Bill Scott was promoted from Executive Vice President & General Counsel to COO. On October 10, Matt Kenseth was named the team’s Competition Advisor.

On January 25, 2024, Trevor Bayne was named the team's Competition Advisor. On July 14, Bobby Kennedy was named General Manager, while Competition Director Joey Cohen left the team.

On January 27, 2025, Johnson was named majority owner of Legacy Motor Club, with Knighthead Capital Management purchasing a minority stake and Gallagher stepping back into an ambassador role.

=== Strategic Ownership Group ===
On March 25, 2026, Darius Rucker was named co-owner of LMC. On June 25, 2026, Guy Fieri was named strategic owner of LMC. On July 30, 2026, LMC announced that the team would be owned by a strategic ownership group that includes Rucker, Fieri, Bryce Harper, Kelly Slater, Andy Roddick, Scott Dixon, Dario Franchitti, Tony Kanaan, Jen Rubio, Chase Utley, Danny Sullivan, Ben Lovett, Nat Zilkha, and others.

=== Lawsuit against Rick Ware Racing ===
On April 1, 2025, LMC sued Rick Ware Racing over the sale of a charter. On March 3, both teams signed a deal for RWR to sell a charter to LMC, but RWR has allegedly backed out on the deal. RWR claims the agreement would go in effect in 2027, but LMC changed the terms to 2026 without any communication with RWR.

On April 9, LMC obtained a temporary restraining order preventing RWR from selling, leasing, or otherwise encumbering the charter in question for at least 10 days or until agreement by LMC and RWR. However, a North Carolina judge denied LMC the injunction. It was revealed that the lawsuit resulted from a confusion over which of RWR's two charters was in the transaction. The agreement stated Charter 36 (currently used by the No. 51 car) was to be sold for US$45 million; LMC's attorney argued that the contract listed Charter 27 (which was leased to RFK Racing for the No. 60 car in 2025). RWR's attorney claimed that two weeks after the agreement was signed, LMC offered to pay RWR an additional US$5 million for Charter 27 for 2026. RFK has an agreement to lease Charter 36 in 2026, as teams are allowed to lease charters once every seven years.

On June 18, RWR filed a countersuit against LMC, citing LMC made a false claim of purchasing the charter for 2026.

On July 14, The courts granted LMC permission to depose RWR following the recent revelation that T.J. Puchyr intends to purchase RWR. On July 16, LMC filed a lawsuit against Puchyr for tortious interference, alleging that he attempted to purchase RWR and violated the state’s Unfair and Deceptive Trade Practices Act by using insider knowledge and a position of trust to interfere with Legacy’s agreement with RWR. On July 31, a judge granted LMC a temporary restraining order against RWR, preventing RWR from closing the team's sale to Puchyr for ten days.

On September 19, 2025, it was announced that LMC and RWR ended their lawsuit under a settlement, with RWR selling the charter to LMC; the rest of their settlement agreement is still unknown.

== Cup Series ==
=== Car No. 42 history ===
Ty Dillon (2022)

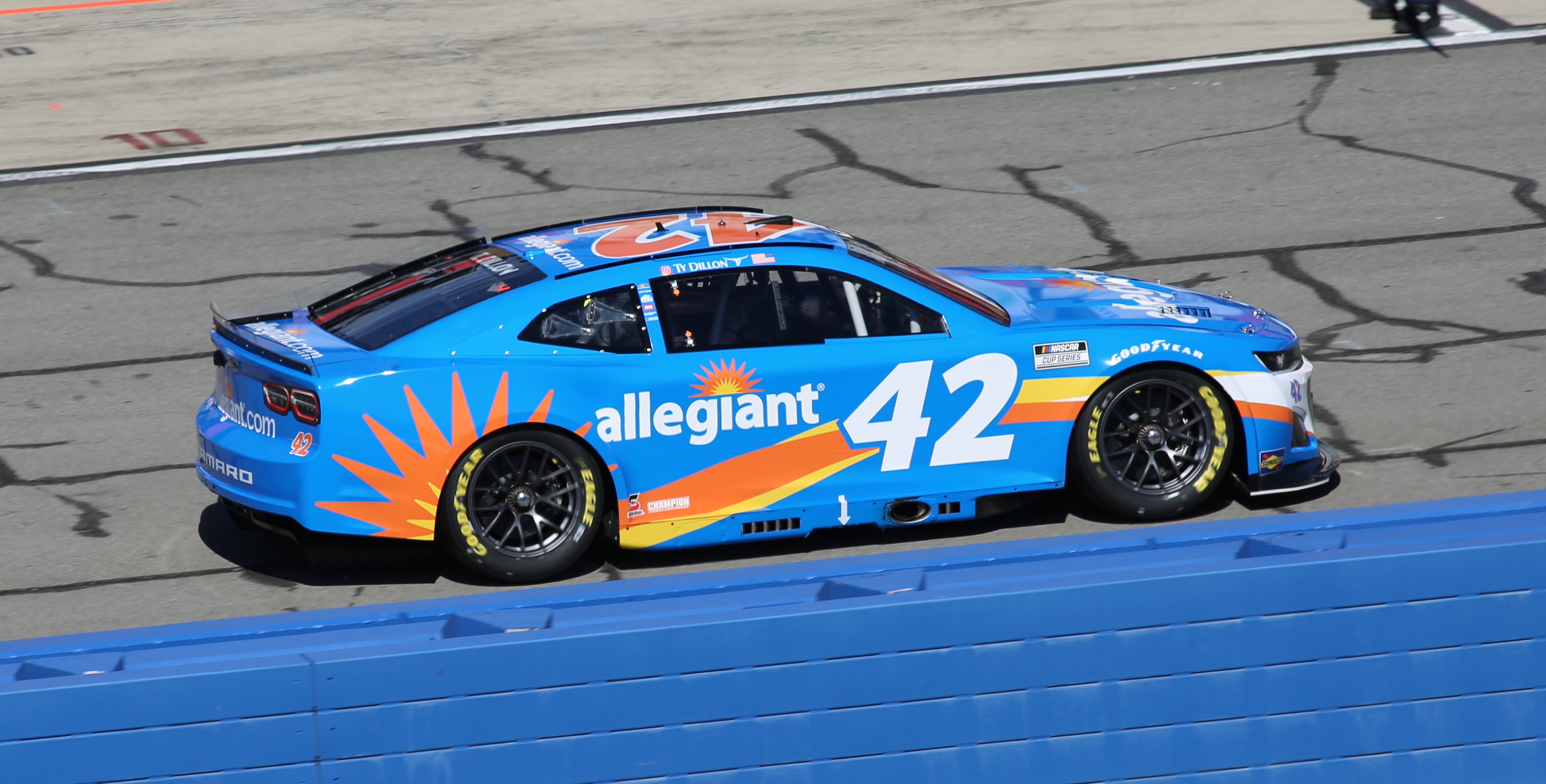
Ty Dillon in the No. 42 at Auto Club Speedway in 2022

On June 17, 2021, Gallagher announced that GMS Racing would move up to the NASCAR Cup Series in 2022. On October 10, GMS announced that Ty Dillon would drive the then-No. 94 in their inaugural Cup season. On December 1, Gallagher purchased a majority interest in Richard Petty Motorsports for US$19 million. The deal included both of RPM's charters; the No. 43 would continue to operate with its charter while the second charter – which was leased to Rick Ware Racing for the No. 51 from 2019 to 2021 – would be transferred to GMS' entry which was re-numbered from 94 to No. 42.

Dillon began the 2022 season with an eleventh place finish at the 2022 Daytona 500. Throughout the season, he only scored a top-ten finish at the Bristol dirt race. On July 15, Dillon announced that he would part ways with Petty GMS at the end of the 2022 season. Prior to the Pocono race, the No. 42 was docked 35 driver and owner points for an L1 penalty when the pre-race inspection revealed issues on the car's rocker box vent hole. At Kansas, the No. 42 began to use pit crew members from Joe Gibbs Racing; both the No. 42 and No. 43 will use JGR pit crew members starting in 2023. Dillon ended the season 29th in the points standings.

Noah Gragson, multiple drivers (2023)

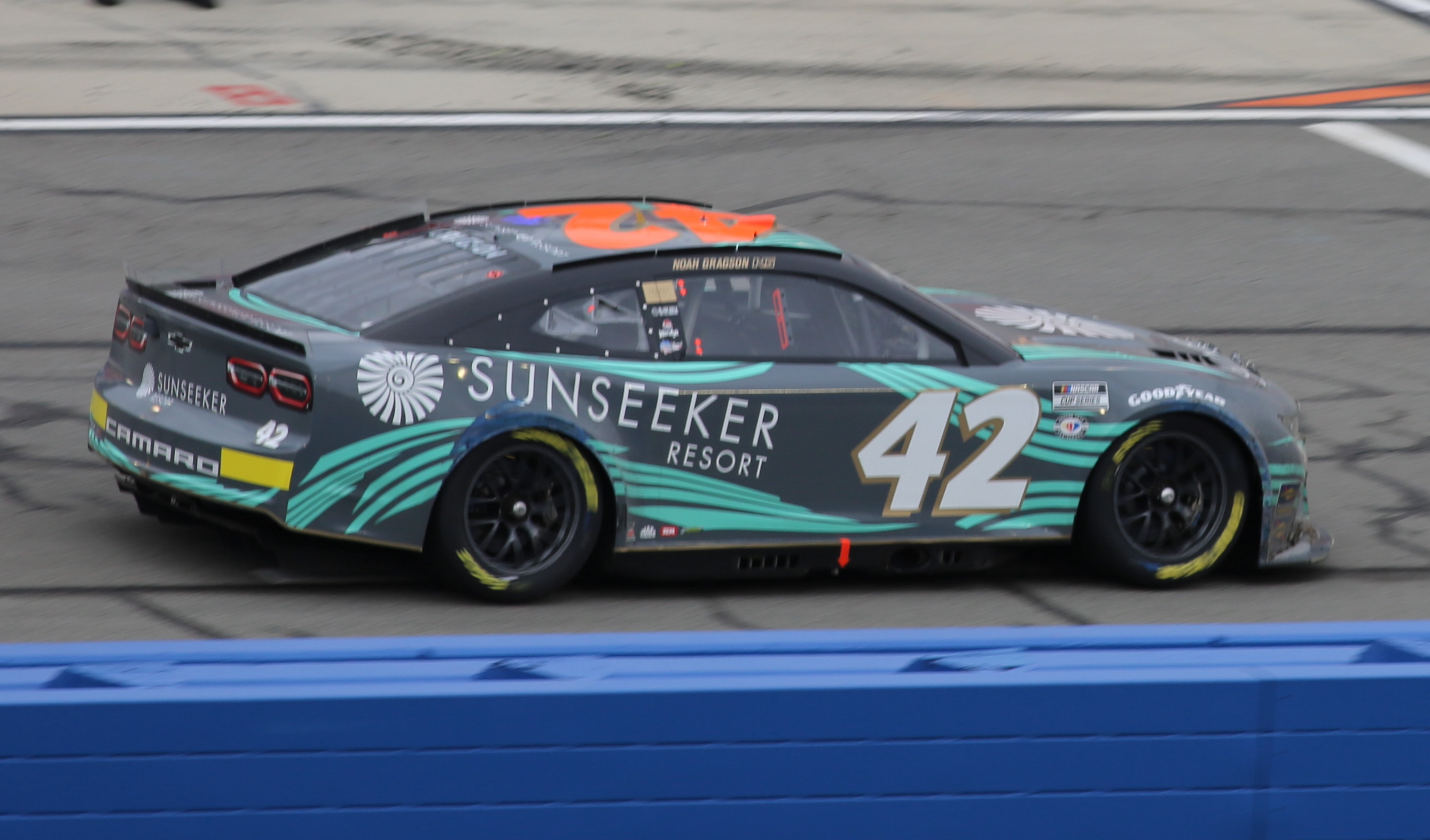
Noah Gragson in the No. 42 at Auto Club Speedway in 2023

On August 10, Petty GMS announced that Noah Gragson would replace Dillon for the 2023 season, having signed a two-year contract with the team. Gragson started the season with a 24th-place finish at the 2023 Daytona 500. Shortly after finishing 29th at Kansas, he confronted Ross Chastain over a racing incident between them that resulted in Gragson hitting the outside wall. Gragson shoved Chastain, who retaliated with a punch to the face. At Gateway, Gragson was involved in a hard crash due to a brake rotor failure. His car spun down toward the apron and then back up the track, hitting the wall first with the rear of his car and then the front. Gragson suffered concussion-like symptoms from the crash and was replaced by Grant Enfinger at Sonoma. Enfinger finished 26th. On August 5, NASCAR and LMC suspended Gragson indefinitely for violation of Section 4.4.D. of the NASCAR Rule Book, which concerns member conduct, after Gragson liked an offensive meme related to the murder of George Floyd on social media. Josh Berry replaced Gragson at Michigan, where he finished 34th after a hard crash in Turn 4 on lap 51. Mike Rockenfeller drove the No. 42 to a 24th-place finish at Indianapolis, a 19th at Watkins Glen, and a 29th at the Charlotte Roval. On August 10, Gragson requested to be released from his contract with LMC so he can focus on the reinstatement process. Carson Hocevar drove the No. 42 to a seventeenth place finish at Darlington. Hocevar finished twentieth at Kansas, earning the No. 42’s first back-to-back top-twenty finishes since Atlanta and COTA. A week later, he scored a career-best eleventh place finish at the Bristol night race. On October 4, Hocevar was signed for the final four races. On October 16, LMC announced that John Hunter Nemechek would drive the No. 42 at Homestead instead of Hocevar, with Hocevar still running the final two races. Nemechek finished 32nd after being involved in a crash on Lap 222. The No. 42 team ended the season 32nd in the owners’ standings.

John Hunter Nemechek (2024–2026)

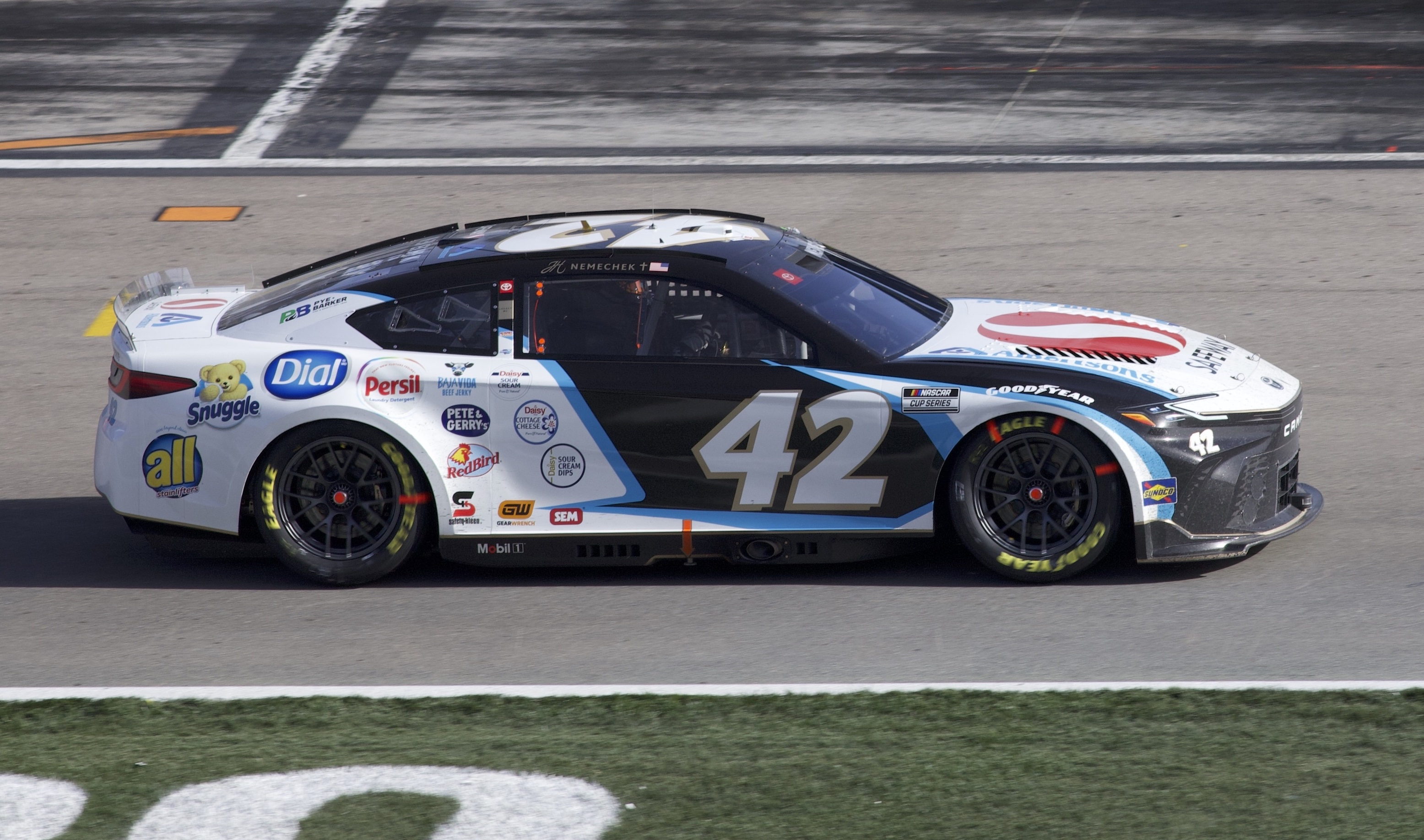
John Hunter Nemechek's No. 42 car at Las Vegas Motor Speedway in 2024

On September 6, 2023, Legacy Motor Club announced that John Hunter Nemechek will drive the No. 42 in 2024. On October 8, 2024, technical director Brian Campe replaced Ben Beshore as crew chief of the No. 42. On November 19, LMC named Travis Mack as the crew chief of the No. 42 in 2025.

Nemechek started the 2025 season with a fifth-place finish at 2025 Daytona 500, a career best. He followed that up with a tenth-place finish at Atlanta.

Nemechek started the 2026 season with a 26th-place DNF at 2026 Daytona 500. He led most of the Pocono race on alternate strategy but was later passed by Denny Hamlin, finishing 4th. On August 20, the team confirmed that their No. 42 car would temporarily be renumbered to the No. 40 for the 2026 Dollar Tree 301 at New Hampshire Motor Speedway in celebration of the 40th anniversary of the founding of Dollar Tree. On September 1, 2026, it was confirmed that Nemechek would not be returning to the team in 2027.

Josh Berry (2027)

On September 8, 2026, it was announced that Josh Berry would drive the No. 42 for the 2027 season.

==== Car No. 42 results ====
Year	Driver	No.	Make	1	2	3	4	5	6	7	8	9	10	11	12	13	14	15	16	17	18	19	20	21	22	23	24	25	26	27	28	29	30	31	32	33	34	35	36	Owners	Pts
2022	Ty Dillon	42	Chevy	DAY; 11	CAL; 17	LVS; 20	PHO; 15	ATL; 36	COA; 20	RCH; 24	MAR; 23	BRD; 10	TAL; 33	DOV; 27	DAR; 12	KAN; 20	CLT; 13	GTW; 27	SON; 23	NSH; 31	ROA; 20	ATL; 28	NHA; 33	POC; 22	IND; 34	MCH; 14	RCH; 17	GLN; 16	DAY; 18	DAR; 22	KAN; 20	BRI; 26	TEX; 16	TAL; 23	CLT; 25	LVS; 33	HOM; 24	MAR; 31	PHO; 26	31st	518
2023	Noah Gragson	42	Chevy	DAY; 24	CAL; 22	LVS; 30	PHO; 29	ATL; 12	COA; 20	RCH; 37	BRD; 33	MAR; 30	TAL; 32	DOV; 34	KAN; 29	DAR; 26	CLT; 36	GTW; 33		NSH; 26	CSC; 25	ATL; 33	NHA; 32	POC; 22	RCH; 28															32nd	389
2023	Grant Enfinger	42	Chevy																SON; 26																					32nd	389
2023	Josh Berry	42	Chevy																							MCH; 34			DAY; 22											32nd	389
2023	Mike Rockenfeller	42	Chevy																								IRC; 24	GLN; 19							ROV; 29					32nd	389
2023	Carson Hocevar	42	Chevy																											DAR; 17	KAN; 20	BRI; 11	TEX; 16	TAL; 35		LVS; 35		MAR; 31	PHO; 19	32nd	389
2023	John Hunter Nemechek	42	Chevy																																		HOM; 32			32nd	389
2024	John Hunter Nemechek	42	Toyota	DAY; 7	ATL; 21	LVS; 22	PHO; 25	BRI; 6	COA; 21	RCH; 25	MAR; 36	TEX; 34	TAL; 33	DOV; 20	KAN; 13	DAR; 31	CLT; 30	GTW; 27	SON; 29	IOW; 26	NHA; 8	NSH; 31	CSC; 35	POC; 28	IND; 29	RCH; 31	MCH; 29	DAY; 15	DAR; 25	ATL; 33	GLN; 21	BRI; 33	KAN; 30	TAL; 31	ROV; 34	LVS; 9	HOM; 26	MAR; 31	PHO; 30	35th	447
2025	John Hunter Nemechek	42	Toyota	DAY; 5	ATL; 10	COA; 22	PHO; 14	LVS; 20	HOM; 23	MAR; 25	DAR; 30	BRI; 21	TAL; 30	TEX; 8	KAN; 10	CLT; 27	NSH; 27	MCH; 34	MXC; 6	POC; 6	ATL; 26	CSC; 15	SON; 28	DOV; 21	IND; 12	IOW; 15	GLN; 32	RCH; 36	DAY; 17	DAR; 4	GTW; 6	BRI; 14	NHA; 34	KAN; 32	ROV; 26	LVS; 29	TAL; 14	MAR; 21	PHO; 31	25th	664
2026	John Hunter Nemechek	42	Toyota	DAY; 26	ATL; 19	COA; 17	PHO; 25	LVS; 21	DAR; 27	MAR; 29	BRI; 35	KAN; 22	TAL; 22	TEX; 21	GLN; 10	CLT; 26	NSH; 24	MCH; 14	POC; 4*	COR; 16	SON; 25	CHI; 23	ATL; 18	NWS; 31	IND; 32	IOW; 19	RCH; 22		DAY; 15	DAR; 24	GTW; 15	BRI; 25	KAN; 13	LVS; 29	CLT; 35	PHO; 33	TAL; 39	MAR; 31	HOM; 30	30th	517
2026	John Hunter Nemechek	40	Toyota																									NHA; 31												30th	517

=== Car No. 43 history ===
Erik Jones (2022–present)

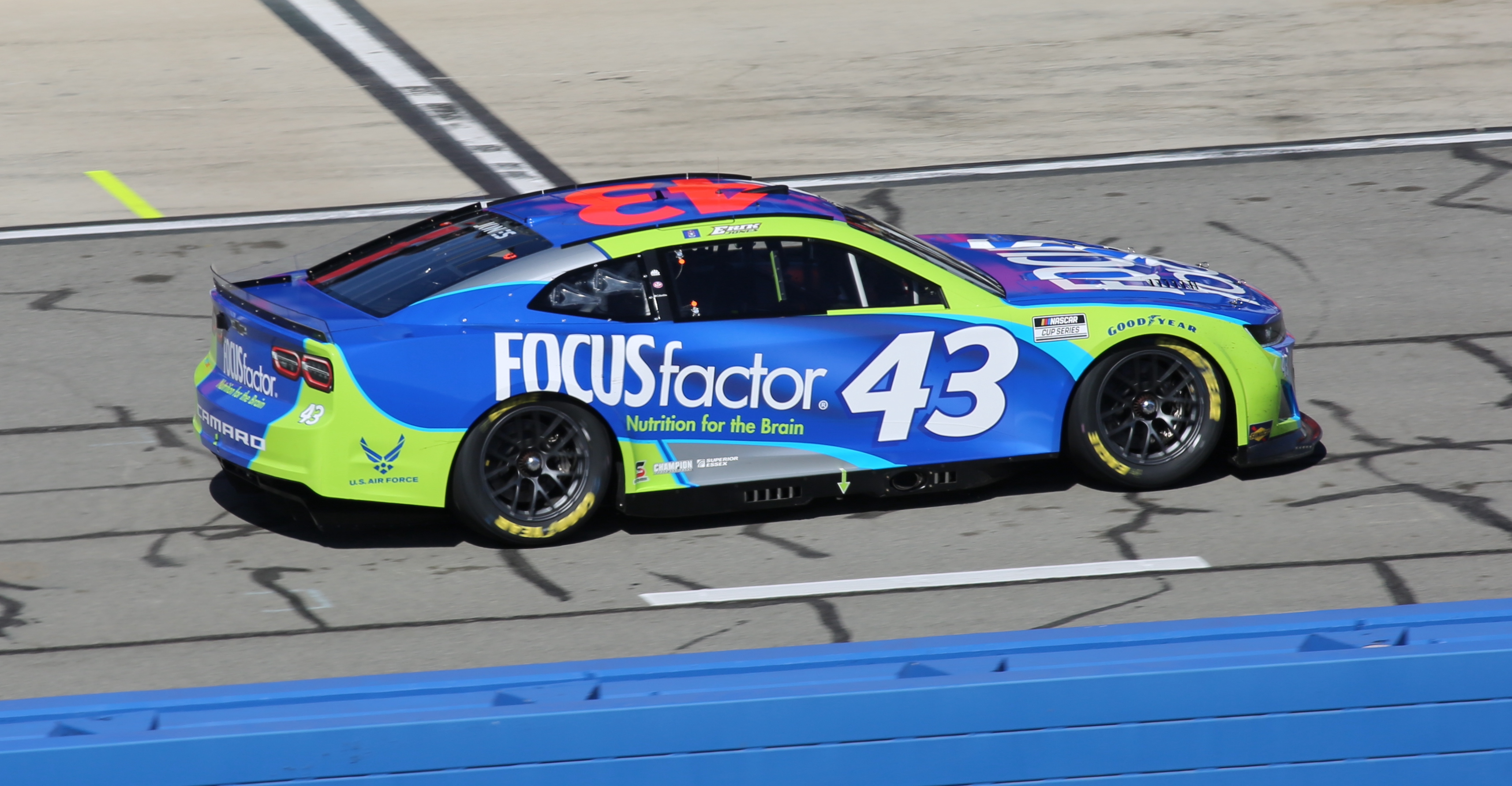
Erik Jones in the No. 43 at Auto Club Speedway in 2022

On October 21, 2020, it was announced that Richard Petty Motorsports had signed Erik Jones to a multi-year contract to drive the 43 car. When GMS bought Richard Petty Motorsports in 2021, Jones was retained to drive the 43 car.

Jones began the 2022 season with a 29th-place finish at the 2022 Daytona 500. He scored 13 top-ten finishes during the season, including a third-place finish at Fontana and a fourth-place finish at Atlanta. Prior to the Pocono race, the No. 43 was docked 35 driver and owner points for an L1 penalty when the pre-race inspection revealed issues on the car's rocker box vent hole. Jones was signed to a multi-year agreement on July 30. Despite not making the playoffs, he won at Darlington, giving Petty GMS its first win. In addition, he gave the No. 43 its first win since the 2014 Coke Zero 400 and its overall 200th win. Jones ended the season eighteenth in the points standings.

Jones started the 2023 season with hard rock band Guns N' Roses sponsoring the No. 43 for the 2023 Daytona 500, where he finished 37th after wrecking out early. At Talladega, Jones earned his third consecutive sixth place finish at the track (he finished sixth in both races in 2022), and claim his second top-ten of the season. On June 7, following an eighteenth place finish at the Gateway race, NASCAR gave the No. 43 an L1 penalty after a post-race inspection revealed illegal modifications to the car's greenhouse. As a result, the team was docked sixty driver and owner points and five playoff points. In addition, crew chief Dave Elenz was fined US$75,000 and suspended for two races. After a 32nd place finish at Sonoma, Jones finished sixteenth or better in the next five consecutive races, including an eighth place finish at Nashville and a ninth place finish at Pocono. Jones earned his fifth top-ten of the season at Michigan, finishing 10th. Jones failed to qualify for the playoffs after finishing 18th in the regular season finale at Daytona. At Darlington, Jones finished tenth, his sixth top-ten of the season. At Kansas, Jones started on the front row for an overtime restart after a two-tire gamble. After battling Joey Logano for the lead, Tyler Reddick passed them both coming to the white flag. Jones ultimately finished 3rd, his first top-5 since his victory at the 2022 Cook Out Southern 500 and his seventh top-ten of the season. Additionally, this was LMC’s only top-five finish of the season as well as their first as an organization. Jones ended the season 27th in the points standings.

Prior to the 2024 season, Jones gathered major sponsorships from companies AdventHealth and Dollar Tree, including subsidiary Family Dollar. Jones began the season with an eighth place finish in the 2024 Daytona 500, his first top-ten at the track since his third-place finish in the 2019 Daytona 500. At Talladega, Jones was involved in a hard crash on Lap 156 that resulted in him hitting the outside wall head-on after getting hooked from behind. After the race, he was transported to a local hospital due to repeated claims of back soreness. He was released later that night. Two days later, LMC announced that Jones would miss the Dover race after specialists discovered a compression fracture in a lower vertebra. Corey Heim, LMC’s reserve driver, replaced Jones at Dover and Kansas. Jones was cleared to race before the race at Kansas but opted to return to racing at Darlington instead. On October 8, Elenz parted ways with LMC. Ben Beshore transferred from the No. 42 to become the No. 43's crew chief.

Jones started the 2025 season with a 12th place finish at the 2025 Daytona 500. Following the spring Martinsville race, he was disqualified after the car failed to meet the minimum weight requirements.

After failing to make the playoffs, he scored two consecutive top-five finishes at Daytona and Darlington. He finished 24th in the points.

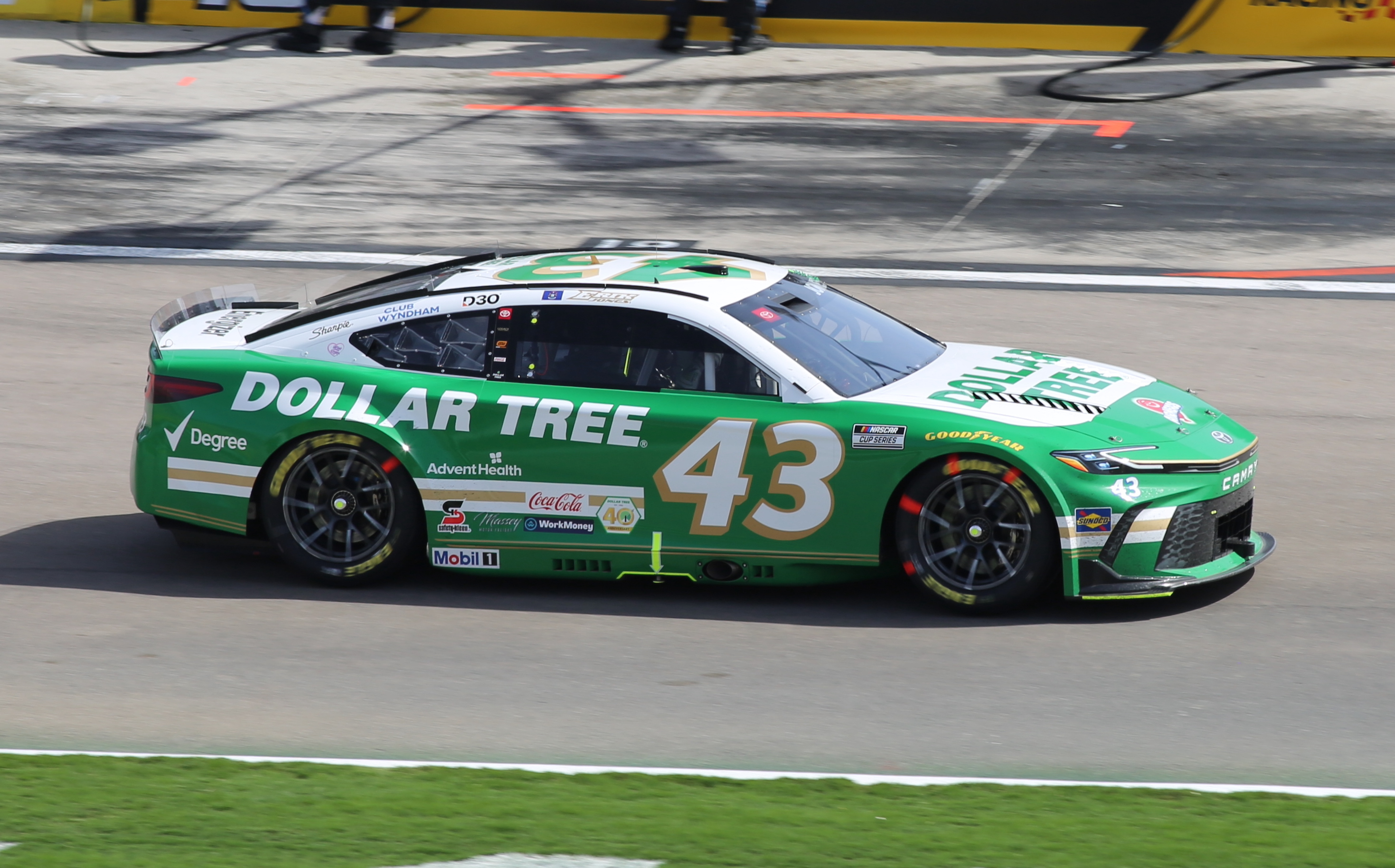
Jones' No. 43 at Las Vegas Motor Speedway in 2026

Jones started the 2026 season with a 21st place finish at the 2026 Daytona 500. At Texas, Jones won his first career stage.

==== Car No. 43 results ====
Year	Driver	No.	Make	1	2	3	4	5	6	7	8	9	10	11	12	13	14	15	16	17	18	19	20	21	22	23	24	25	26	27	28	29	30	31	32	33	34	35	36	Owners	Pts
2022	Erik Jones	43	Chevy	DAY; 29	CAL; 3	LVS; 31	PHO; 25	ATL; 14	COA; 9	RCH; 23	MAR; 13	BRD; 24	TAL; 6	DOV; 10	DAR; 25	KAN; 32	CLT; 14	GTW; 7	SON; 22	NSH; 11	ROA; 26	ATL; 4	NHA; 19	POC; 9	IRC; 15	MCH; 8	RCH; 35	GLN; 10	DAY; 17	DAR; 1	KAN; 29	BRI; 21	TEX; 6	TAL; 6	ROV; 11	LVS; 8	HOM; 30	MAR; 18	PHO; 14	19th	831
2023	Erik Jones	43	Chevy	DAY; 37	CAL; 19	LVS; 19	PHO; 21	ATL; 8	COA; 23	RCH; 31	BRD; 14	MAR; 31	TAL; 6	DOV; 16	KAN; 21	DAR; 25	CLT; 32	GTW; 18	SON; 32	NSH; 8	CSC; 16	ATL; 11	NHA; 11	POC; 9	RCH; 23	MCH; 10	IRC; 36	GLN; 29	DAY; 18	DAR; 10	KAN; 3	BRI; 24	TEX; 30	TAL; 26	ROV; 36	LVS; 27	HOM; 14	MAR; 21	PHO; 20	27th	578
2024	Erik Jones	43	Toyota	DAY; 8	ATL; 25	LVS; 14	PHO; 31	BRI; 20	COA; 32	RCH; 14	MAR; 12	TEX; 19	TAL; 35			DAR; 19	CLT; 19	GTW; 26	SON; 19	IOW; 32	NHA; 13	NSH; 34	CSC; 29	POC; 14	IND; 28	RCH; 29	MCH; 16	DAY; 17	DAR; 24	ATL; 26	GLN; 33	BRI; 30	KAN; 35	TAL; 5	ROV; 33	LVS; 25	HOM; 22	MAR; 19	PHO; 22	29th	543
2024	Corey Heim	43	Toyota											DOV; 25	KAN; 22																									29th	543
2025	Erik Jones	43	Toyota	DAY; 12	ATL; 31	COA; 27	PHO; 18	LVS; 27	HOM; 15	MAR; 38	DAR; 17	BRI; 21	TAL; 18	TEX; 5	KAN; 32	CLT; 13	NSH; 7	MCH; 11	MXC; 17	POC; 13	ATL; 5	CSC; 25	SON; 29	DOV; 27	IND; 36	IOW; 16	GLN; 12	RCH; 26	DAY; 5	DAR; 3	GTW; 21	BRI; 20	NHA; 28	KAN; 16	ROV; 30	LVS; 15	TAL; 35	MAR; 34	PHO; 16	24th	665
2026	Erik Jones	43	Toyota	DAY; 21	ATL; 24	COA; 34	PHO; 10	LVS; 20	DAR; 10	MAR; 21	BRI; 23	KAN; 23	TAL; 23	TEX; 12	GLN; 19	CLT; 13	NSH; 11	MCH; 2	POC; 6	COR; 20	SON; 23	CHI; 15	ATL; 5	NWS; 21	IND; 27	IOW; 35	RCH; 27	NHA; 33	DAY; 39	DAR; 15	GTW; 13	BRI; 32	KAN; 16	LVS; 25	CLT; 24	PHO; 25	TAL; 28	MAR; 29	HOM; 20	23rd	643

=== Car No. 48 history ===
Daytona 500 with Jimmie Johnson (2027)

On July 26, 2026, it was announced that Johnson would run the No. 48 (on loan from Hendrick Motorsports) for his final Cup start at the 2027 Daytona 500. At the 2026 Coke Zero Sugar 400, Johnson displayed the paint scheme that would be used at the 500.

=== Car No. 84 history ===
Part-time with Jimmie Johnson (2023–2026)

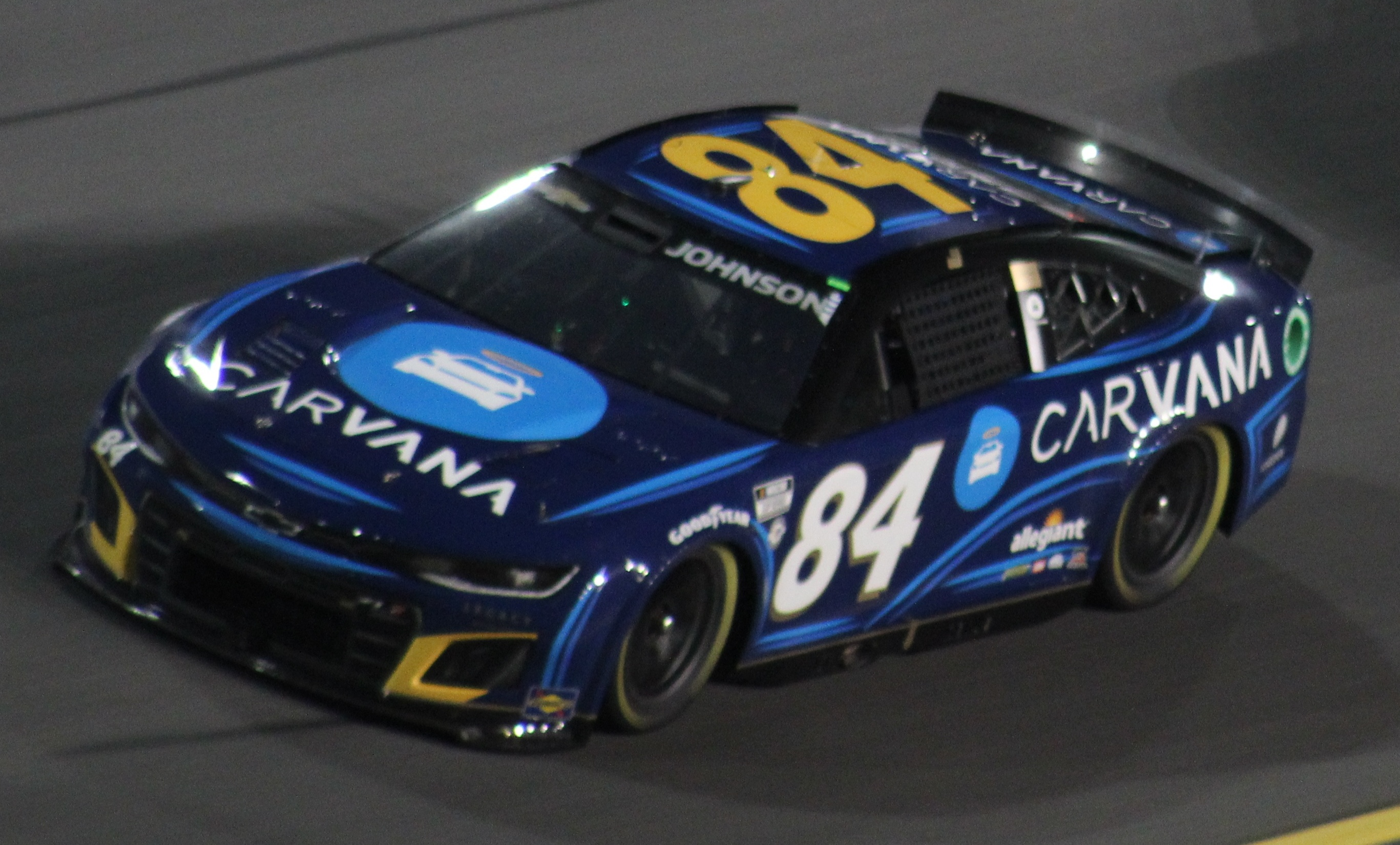
Jimmie Johnson in the No. 84 at Daytona International Speedway in 2023

On January 11, 2023, Legacy Motor Club announced seven-time Cup Series champion Jimmie Johnson will run with a part time schedule in 2023, starting with the 2023 Daytona 500 driving the No. 84 entry. The number is an inverse of Johnson's famous 48 car (still run by Johnson's long-time team Hendrick Motorsports). Johnson also chose the number due to him having 83 wins, and his goal to get one more, which would tie him with Bobby Allison and Darrell Waltrip for fourth all time. On February 14, Johnson made the entry field by scoring the fastest lap among the non-chartered teams. He would finish 31st after wrecking out in the first overtime attempt on Lap 203. Johnson made a start at the COTA race in March, where he finished 38th after wrecking out on the first lap. Johnson's next start would come at the 2023 Coca-Cola 600 in May. He finished 37th after spinning out twice and only completing 115 laps. On June 26, Johnson’s in-laws were involved in a possible murder-suicide at their house in Muskogee, Oklahoma. Johnson was on the original entry list for the Chicago street race, but on June 27, Legacy Motor Club announced it would withdraw his entry from the race due to the tragedy. On September 6, Johnson announced on NASCAR Race Hub that he would not compete in any more races in 2023.

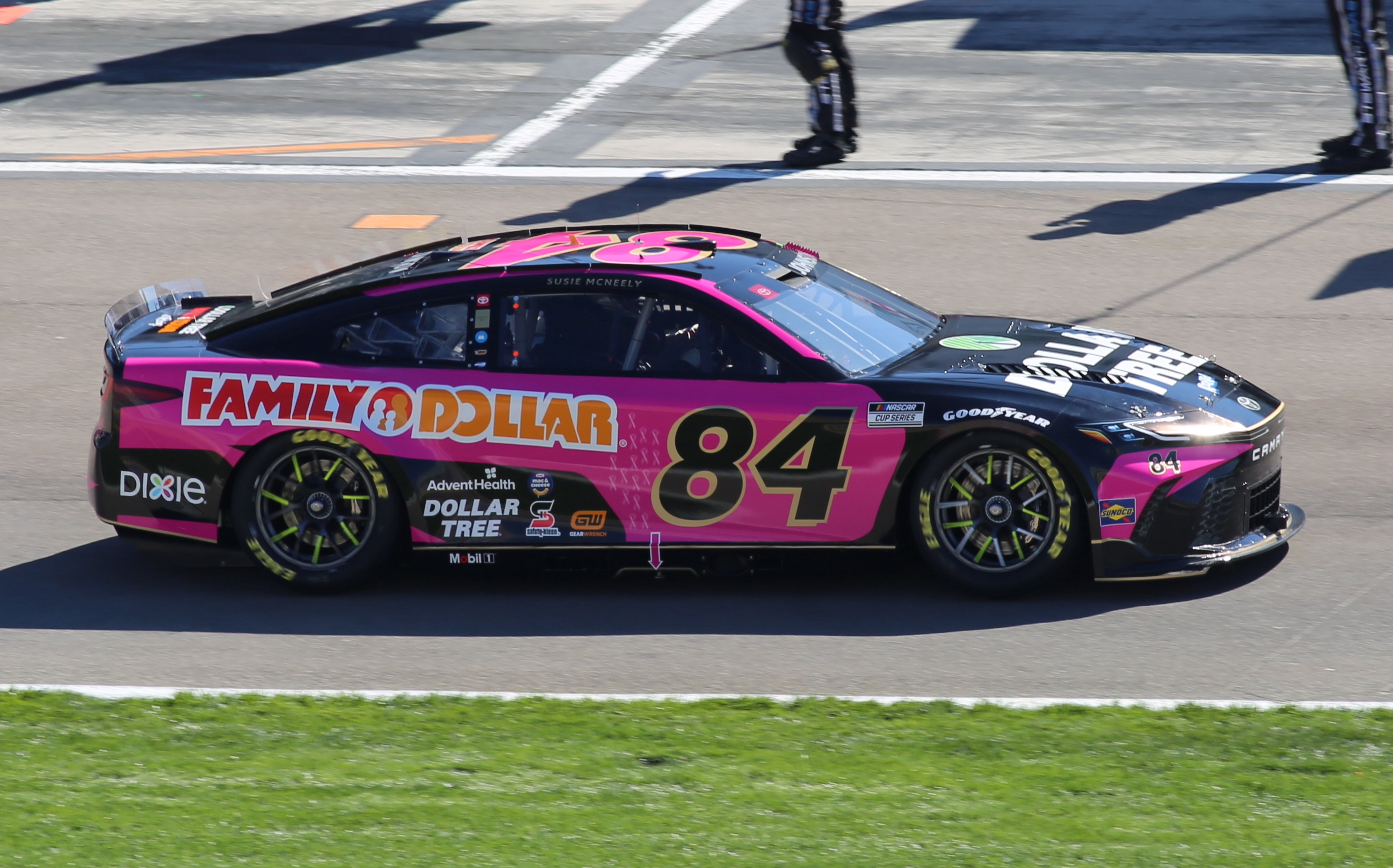
Johnson in the No. 84 at Las Vegas Motor Speedway in 2024

On June 13, 2023, Toyota Racing Development President David Wilson said that Johnson would run another part-time schedule in 2024 when Legacy Motor Club switches from Chevrolet to Toyota at the end of the season, marking the first time that Johnson drive in a non-Chevrolet throughout his NASCAR career. On September 6, Johnson also announced on NASCAR Race Hub that he would drive select races again in the No. 84 in 2024 and that a schedule should be released soon.

Johnson started his 2024 part-time season with a 28th-place finish at the 2024 Daytona 500. He also raced at Texas (29th), Dover (28th), Kansas (38th), Charlotte (29th), and Indianapolis (33rd). On July 26, Legacy Motor Club released crew chief Jason Burdett and several members of the No. 84 team. Performance director Gene Wachtel became the team's crew chief for Kansas.

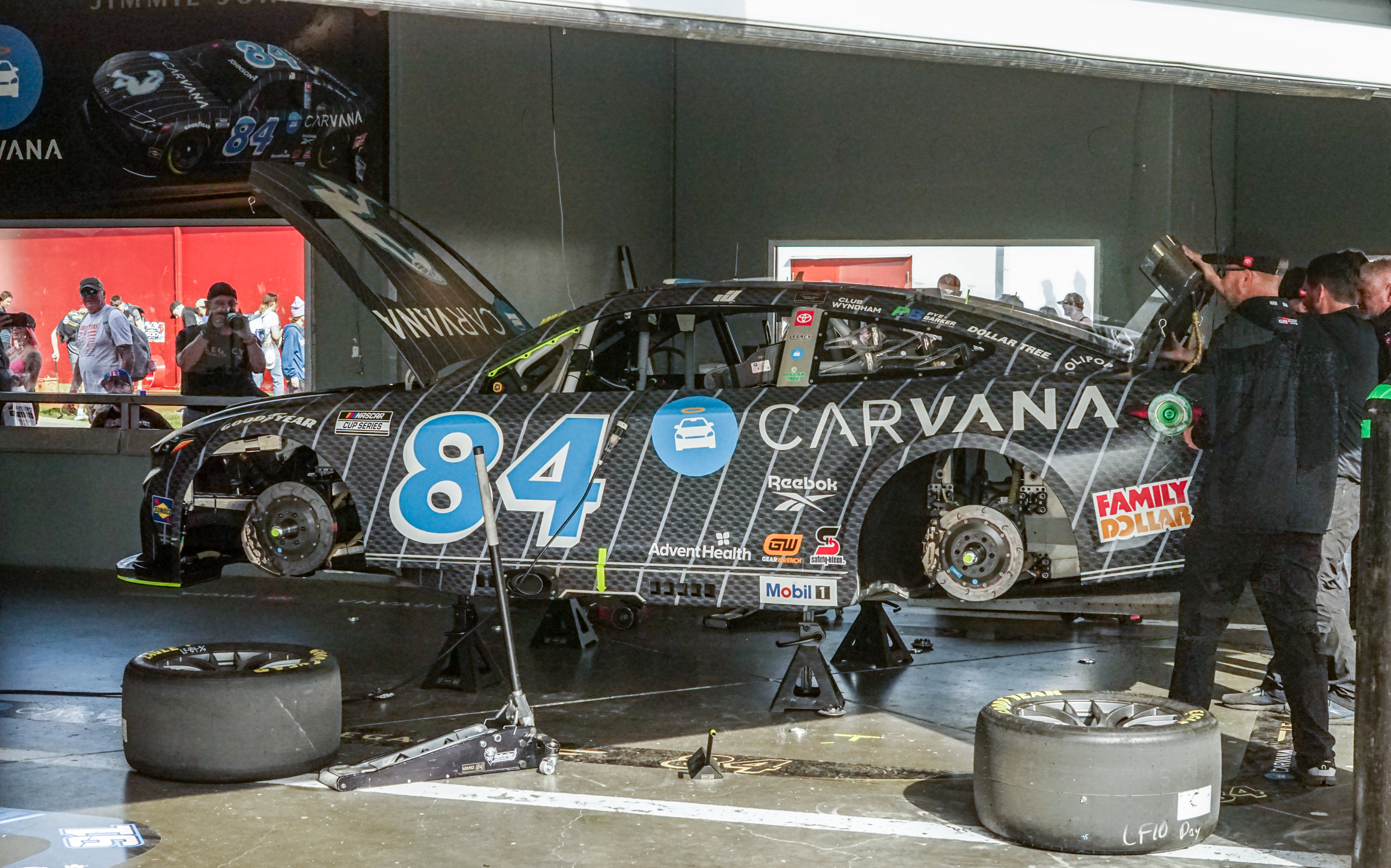
Johnson's No. 84 car in the garage before the 2025 Daytona 500

During the 2025 season, Johnson finished third at the 2025 Daytona 500, his highest finish as an owner-driver. He made his 700th career start at the 2025 Coca-Cola 600, where he finished 40th after being involved in an accident on lap 111.

For the 2026 season, Johnson made the starting grid of the 2026 Daytona 500 after applying for the Open Exemption Provisional. He also ran the Coronado street race.

Riley Herbst (2027–present)

On September 3, 2026, it was announced that Riley Herbst would drive the No. 84 for the 2027 season and beyond.

==== Car No. 84 results ====
Year	Driver	No.	Make	1	2	3	4	5	6	7	8	9	10	11	12	13	14	15	16	17	18	19	20	21	22	23	24	25	26	27	28	29	30	31	32	33	34	35	36	Owners	Pts
2023	Jimmie Johnson	84	Chevy	DAY; 31	CAL	LVS	PHO	ATL	COA; 38	RCH	BRD	MAR	TAL	DOV	KAN	DAR	CLT; 37	GTW	SON	NSH	CSC; Wth	ATL	NHA	POC	RCH	MCH	IRC	GLN	DAY	DAR	KAN	BRI	TEX	TAL	ROV	LVS	HOM	MAR	PHO	43rd	12
2024	Jimmie Johnson	84	Toyota	DAY; 28	ATL	LVS	PHO	BRI	COA	RCH	MAR	TEX; 29	TAL	DOV; 28	KAN; 38	DAR	CLT; 29	GTW	SON	IOW	NHA	NSH	CSC	POC	IND; 33	RCH	MCH	DAY	DAR	ATL	GLN	BRI	KAN; 36	TAL	ROV	LVS; 28	HOM	MAR	PHO; 26	41st	60
2025	Jimmie Johnson	84	Toyota	DAY; 3	ATL	COA	PHO	LVS	HOM	MAR	DAR	BRI	TAL	TEX	KAN	CLT; 40	NSH	MCH	MXC	POC	ATL	CSC	SON	DOV	IND	IOW	GLN	RCH	DAY	DAR	GTW	BRI	NHA	KAN	ROV	LVS	TAL	MAR	PHO	44th	35
2026	Jimmie Johnson	84	Toyota	DAY; 29	ATL	COA	PHO	LVS	DAR	MAR	BRI	KAN	TAL	TEX	GLN	CLT	NSH	MCH	POC	COR; 28	SON	CHI	ATL	NWS	IND	IOW	RCH	NHA	DAY	DAR	GTW	BRI	KAN	LVS	CLT	PHO	TAL	MAR	HOM	43rd	9

=== Reserve drivers ===
Beginning with the team’s transition to Toyota in 2024, a simulation and reserve driver would be hired for each season. For the 2024 season, the team hired Corey Heim for the role, who also served in the same capacity for 23XI Racing. Heim ultimately filled in for Erik Jones, for two races, following a back injury Jones sustained.

For the 2025 season, Kaz Grala, replaced Heim in the role.

== IndyCar Series ==
On April 28, 2026, it was announced that Legacy Motor Club would be joining with Arrow McLaren to field the No. 31 for Ryan Hunter-Reay in the IndyCar Series' 2026 Indianapolis 500.

=== IndyCar Series results ===
(key)

Year	Chassis	Engine	Drivers	No.	1	2	3	4	5	6	7	8	9	10	11	12	13	14	15	16	17	18	Pos.	Pts.
Arrow McLaren with Legacy Motor Club
2026					STP	PHX	ARL	ALA	LBH	IMS	INDY	DET	GAT	ROA	MOH	NSH	POR	MAR	D.C.	MIL		LAG		
2026	Dallara DW12	Chevrolet IndyCar V6t	(United States) Ryan Hunter-Reay	31							32													

== Extreme E ==
In February 2024, Legacy Motor Club joined electric off-road racing series Extreme E for the 2024 season with Jimmie Johnson as the lead driver. Travis Pastrana substituted Johnson, who was tied up with 2024 Daytona 500 during the weekend, for the first two rounds of the season alongside Gray Leadbetter. The team finished in sixth in Rounds 1 and 2 at the Desert X-Prix while scoring its first Super Sector in Round 2. For Rounds 3 and 4, Extreme E male championship reserve driver Patrick O'Donovan was announced as Leadbetter's partner. On September 6, a week before the scheduled Island X-Prix, Extreme E announced that the rounds in Sardinia and Phoenix were canceled.

Legacy Motor Club did not revive their operations in the series when it became Extreme H in 2025.

=== Extreme E results ===
==== Racing overview ====
Year	Name	Car	Tires	No.	G.	Drivers	Rounds	Pts.	Pos.
2024	(United States) Legacy Motor Club	Spark Odyssey 21	**C**	84	F	(United States) Gray Leadbetter	(1–4)	39	6th
2024	(United States) Legacy Motor Club	Spark Odyssey 21	**C**	84	M	(United States) Travis Pastrana	(1–2)	39	6th
2024	(United States) Legacy Motor Club	Spark Odyssey 21	**C**	84	M	(United Kingdom) Patrick O'Donovan	(3–4)	39	6th

==== Racing summary ====
Year	Series	Races	Wins	Pod.	B/Qual.	S/S	Pts.	Pos.
2024	Extreme E	4	0	0	0	1	39	6th

==== Complete Extreme E results ====
(Races in bold indicate best qualifiers; races in italics indicate fastest super sector)

Year	Entrant	1	2	3	4	Pts.	Pos.
2024	Legacy Motor Club	DES2 (Saudi Arabia); 6	DES2 (Saudi Arabia); 6	HYD1 (United Kingdom); 5	HYD2 (United Kingdom); 6	39	6th
