= 2023 Coca-Cola 600 =

NASCAR Cup Series race

Race details
- Race 14 of 36 in the 2023 NASCAR Cup Series
- Date: May 29, 2023
- Location: Charlotte Motor Speedway in Concord, North Carolina, U.S.
- Course: Permanent racing facility
- Course length: 1.5 miles (2.4 km)
- Distance: 400 laps, 600 mi (965.6 km)
- Average speed: 120.465 miles per hour (193.870 km/h)

Pole position
Driver	William Byron	Hendrick Motorsports
- Time: 2.550 (Pandemic Formula)

Most laps led
Driver	Ryan Blaney	Team Penske
- Laps: 163

Winner
No. 12	Ryan Blaney	Team Penske

Television in the United States
- Network: Fox
- Announcers: Mike Joy, Clint Bowyer, Tony Stewart, and Danny McBride (Stage 2)

Radio in the United States
- Radio: PRN
- Booth announcers: Doug Rice and Mark Garrow
- Turn announcers: Rob Albright (1 & 2) and Pat Patterson (3 & 4)

The 2023 Coca-Cola 600 was a NASCAR Cup Series race held on May 29, 2023, at Charlotte Motor Speedway in Concord, North Carolina and the 64th running of the event. Contested over 400 laps on the 1.5-mile (2.4 km) asphalt speedway, it was the 14th race of the 2023 NASCAR Cup Series season, as well as the second of the three crown jewel races. The race was postponed from Sunday, May 28 to Monday, May 29, due to rain.

== Report ==
=== Background ===
Charlotte Motor Speedway, the track where the race was held.

The race was held at Charlotte Motor Speedway, located in Concord, North Carolina. The speedway complex includes a 1.5-mile (2.4 km) quad-oval track that was utilized for the race, as well as a dragstrip and a dirt track. The speedway was built in 1959 by Bruton Smith and is considered the home track for NASCAR with many race teams based in the Charlotte metropolitan area. The track is owned and operated by Speedway Motorsports Inc. (SMI) with Marcus G. Smith serving as track president.

Similar to the Daytona 500, which was a four-stage race (with the first stage being the qualifying heat race), the Coca-Cola 600 is a four-stage race, with this the only race where all four stages are in the main race itself. All four stages are scheduled to consist of 100 laps. The race is official after the second stage.

==== Entry list ====
- (R) denotes rookie driver.
- (i) denotes the driver ineligible for series driver points.

No.	Driver	Team	Manufacturer
1	Ross Chastain	Trackhouse Racing	Chevrolet
2	Austin Cindric	Team Penske	Ford
3	Austin Dillon	Richard Childress Racing	Chevrolet
4	Kevin Harvick	Stewart-Haas Racing	Ford
5	Kyle Larson	Hendrick Motorsports	Chevrolet
6	Brad Keselowski	RFK Racing	Ford
7	Corey LaJoie	Spire Motorsports	Chevrolet
8	Kyle Busch	Richard Childress Racing	Chevrolet
9	Chase Elliott	Hendrick Motorsports	Chevrolet
10	Aric Almirola	Stewart-Haas Racing	Ford
11	Denny Hamlin	Joe Gibbs Racing	Toyota
12	Ryan Blaney	Team Penske	Ford
14	Chase Briscoe	Stewart-Haas Racing	Ford
15	J. J. Yeley (i)	Rick Ware Racing	Ford
16	A. J. Allmendinger	Kaulig Racing	Chevrolet
17	Chris Buescher	RFK Racing	Ford
19	Martin Truex Jr.	Joe Gibbs Racing	Toyota
20	Christopher Bell	Joe Gibbs Racing	Toyota
21	Harrison Burton	Wood Brothers Racing	Ford
22	Joey Logano	Team Penske	Ford
23	Bubba Wallace	23XI Racing	Toyota
24	William Byron	Hendrick Motorsports	Chevrolet
31	Justin Haley	Kaulig Racing	Chevrolet
34	Michael McDowell	Front Row Motorsports	Ford
38	Zane Smith (i)	Front Row Motorsports	Ford
41	Ryan Preece	Stewart-Haas Racing	Ford
42	Noah Gragson (R)	Legacy Motor Club	Chevrolet
43	Erik Jones	Legacy Motor Club	Chevrolet
45	Tyler Reddick	23XI Racing	Toyota
47	Ricky Stenhouse Jr.	JTG Daugherty Racing	Chevrolet
48	Alex Bowman	Hendrick Motorsports	Chevrolet
51	Todd Gilliland	Rick Ware Racing	Ford
54	Ty Gibbs (R)	Joe Gibbs Racing	Toyota
77	Ty Dillon	Spire Motorsports	Chevrolet
78	B. J. McLeod	Live Fast Motorsports	Chevrolet
84	Jimmie Johnson	Legacy Motor Club	Chevrolet
99	Daniel Suárez	Trackhouse Racing	Chevrolet
Official entry list

== Practice ==
Practice was cancelled due to inclement weather.

== Qualifying ==
Qualifying was cancelled due to inclement weather. William Byron was awarded the pole for the race as a result of NASCAR's pandemic formula with a score of 2.550.

=== Starting lineup ===
Pos	No.	Driver	Team	Manufacturer
1	24	William Byron	Hendrick Motorsports	Chevrolet
2	4	Kevin Harvick	Stewart-Haas Racing	Ford
3	6	Brad Keselowski	RFK Racing	Ford
4	11	Denny Hamlin	Joe Gibbs Racing	Toyota
5	8	Kyle Busch	Richard Childress Racing	Chevrolet
6	9	Chase Elliott	Hendrick Motorsports	Chevrolet
7	23	Bubba Wallace	23XI Racing	Toyota
8	12	Ryan Blaney	Team Penske	Ford
9	20	Christopher Bell	Joe Gibbs Racing	Toyota
10	47	Ricky Stenhouse Jr.	JTG Daugherty Racing	Chevrolet
11	17	Chris Buescher	RFK Racing	Ford
12	5	Kyle Larson	Hendrick Motorsports	Chevrolet
13	21	Harrison Burton	Wood Brothers Racing	Ford
14	1	Ross Chastain	Trackhouse Racing	Chevrolet
15	45	Tyler Reddick	23XI Racing	Toyota
16	31	Justin Haley	Kaulig Racing	Chevrolet
17	22	Joey Logano	Team Penske	Ford
18	19	Martin Truex Jr.	Joe Gibbs Racing	Toyota
19	54	Ty Gibbs (R)	Joe Gibbs Racing	Toyota
20	14	Chase Briscoe	Stewart-Haas Racing	Ford
21	2	Austin Cindric	Team Penske	Ford
22	41	Ryan Preece	Stewart-Haas Racing	Ford
23	10	Aric Almirola	Stewart-Haas Racing	Ford
24	99	Daniel Suárez	Trackhouse Racing	Chevrolet
25	7	Corey LaJoie	Spire Motorsports	Chevrolet
26	43	Erik Jones	Legacy Motor Club	Chevrolet
27	16	A. J. Allmendinger	Kaulig Racing	Chevrolet
28	42	Noah Gragson (R)	Legacy Motor Club	Chevrolet
29	38	Zane Smith (i)	Front Row Motorsports	Ford
30	34	Michael McDowell	Front Row Motorsports	Ford
31	48	Alex Bowman	Hendrick Motorsports	Chevrolet
32	77	Ty Dillon	Spire Motorsports	Chevrolet
33	3	Austin Dillon	Richard Childress Racing	Chevrolet
34	78	B. J. McLeod	Live Fast Motorsports	Chevrolet
35	51	Todd Gilliland	Rick Ware Racing	Ford
36	15	J. J. Yeley (i)	Rick Ware Racing	Ford
37	84	Jimmie Johnson	Legacy Motor Club	Chevrolet
Official starting lineup

== Race ==
Ryan Blaney won the race driving a Ford for Team Penske. It was Blaney's first Cup Series race win since the 2022 NASCAR All-Star Race, and his first points-paying win since the 2021 Coke Zero Sugar 400. Chase Elliott was suspended from the following race after he intentionally right-hooked Denny Hamlin's car in the dog-leg of the frontstretch, causing a crash. On Wednesday May 31, NASCAR levied an L3 penalty to the No. 14 Stewart-Haas Racing team of Chase Briscoe for counterfeiting a single-source part. The penalty is the largest single team penalty to occur in the Next Gen era, with Briscoe's team being docked 120 driver and owner points and 25 playoff points. In addition, Briscoe's crew chief, Johnny Klausmeier, was given a six race suspension and the team was fined $250,000.

=== Race results ===
==== Stage results ====
Stage One Laps: 100

Pos	No	Driver	Team	Manufacturer	Points
1	24	William Byron	Hendrick Motorsports	Chevrolet	10
2	20	Christopher Bell	Joe Gibbs Racing	Toyota	9
3	12	Ryan Blaney	Team Penske	Ford	8
4	45	Tyler Reddick	23XI Racing	Toyota	7
5	19	Martin Truex Jr.	Joe Gibbs Racing	Toyota	6
6	11	Denny Hamlin	Joe Gibbs Racing	Toyota	5
7	8	Kyle Busch	Richard Childress Racing	Chevrolet	4
8	6	Brad Keselowski	RFK Racing	Ford	3
9	5	Kyle Larson	Hendrick Motorsports	Chevrolet	2
10	47	Ricky Stenhouse Jr.	JTG Daugherty Racing	Chevrolet	1
Official stage one results

Stage Two Laps: 100

Pos	No	Driver	Team	Manufacturer	Points
1	17	Chris Buescher	RFK Racing	Ford	10
2	4	Kevin Harvick	Stewart-Haas Racing	Ford	9
3	6	Brad Keselowski	RFK Racing	Ford	8
4	22	Joey Logano	Team Penske	Ford	7
5	12	Ryan Blaney	Team Penske	Ford	6
6	20	Christopher Bell	Joe Gibbs Racing	Toyota	5
7	54	Ty Gibbs (R)	Joe Gibbs Racing	Toyota	4
8	24	William Byron	Hendrick Motorsports	Chevrolet	3
9	1	Ross Chastain	Trackhouse Racing	Chevrolet	2
10	23	Bubba Wallace	23XI Racing	Toyota	1
Official stage two results

Stage Three Laps: 100

Pos	No	Driver	Team	Manufacturer	Points
1	12	Ryan Blaney	Team Penske	Ford	10
2	45	Tyler Reddick	23XI Racing	Toyota	9
3	19	Martin Truex Jr.	Joe Gibbs Racing	Toyota	8
4	24	William Byron	Hendrick Motorsports	Chevrolet	7
5	54	Ty Gibbs (R)	Joe Gibbs Racing	Toyota	6
6	5	Kyle Larson	Hendrick Motorsports	Chevrolet	5
7	8	Kyle Busch	Richard Childress Racing	Chevrolet	4
8	4	Kevin Harvick	Stewart-Haas Racing	Ford	3
9	47	Ricky Stenhouse Jr.	JTG Daugherty Racing	Chevrolet	2
10	48	Alex Bowman	Hendrick Motorsports	Chevrolet	1
Official stage three results

=== Final Stage results ===
Stage Four Laps: 100

Pos	Grid	No	Driver	Team	Manufacturer	Laps	Points
1	8	12	Ryan Blaney	Team Penske	Ford	400	64
2	1	24	William Byron	Hendrick Motorsports	Chevrolet	400	55
3	18	19	Martin Truex Jr.	Joe Gibbs Racing	Toyota	400	48
4	7	23	Bubba Wallace	23XI Racing	Toyota	400	34
5	15	45	Tyler Reddick	23XI Racing	Toyota	400	48
6	5	8	Kyle Busch	Richard Childress Racing	Chevrolet	400	39
7	10	47	Ricky Stenhouse Jr.	JTG Daugherty Racing	Chevrolet	400	33
8	11	17	Chris Buescher	RFK Racing	Ford	400	39
9	33	3	Austin Dillon	Richard Childress Racing	Chevrolet	400	28
10	29	38	Zane Smith (i)	Front Row Motorsports	Ford	400	0
11	2	4	Kevin Harvick	Stewart-Haas Racing	Ford	400	38
12	31	48	Alex Bowman	Hendrick Motorsports	Chevrolet	400	26
13	22	41	Ryan Preece	Stewart-Haas Racing	Ford	400	24
14	27	16	A. J. Allmendinger	Kaulig Racing	Chevrolet	400	23
15	16	31	Justin Haley	Kaulig Racing	Chevrolet	400	22
16	36	15	J. J. Yeley (i)	Rick Ware Racing	Ford	400	0
17	25	7	Corey LaJoie	Spire Motorsports	Chevrolet	400	20
18	13	21	Harrison Burton	Wood Brothers Racing	Ford	400	19
19	3	6	Brad Keselowski	RFK Racing	Ford	400	29
20	20	14	Chase Briscoe	Stewart-Haas Racing	Ford	400	-103
21	17	22	Joey Logano	Team Penske	Ford	400	23
22	14	1	Ross Chastain	Trackhouse Racing	Chevrolet	400	17
23	24	99	Daniel Suárez	Trackhouse Racing	Chevrolet	400	14
24	9	20	Christopher Bell	Joe Gibbs Racing	Toyota	400	27
25	23	10	Aric Almirola	Stewart-Haas Racing	Ford	400	12
26	19	54	Ty Gibbs (R)	Joe Gibbs Racing	Toyota	398	21
27	32	77	Ty Dillon	Spire Motorsports	Chevrolet	397	10
28	30	34	Michael McDowell	Front Row Motorsports	Ford	396	9
29	34	78	B. J. McLeod	Live Fast Motorsports	Chevrolet	392	8
30	12	5	Kyle Larson	Hendrick Motorsports	Chevrolet	377	14
31	21	2	Austin Cindric	Team Penske	Ford	369	6
32	26	43	Erik Jones	Legacy Motor Club	Chevrolet	341	5
33	35	51	Todd Gilliland	Rick Ware Racing	Ford	265	4
34	6	9	Chase Elliott	Hendrick Motorsports	Chevrolet	185	3
35	4	11	Denny Hamlin	Joe Gibbs Racing	Toyota	185	7
36	28	42	Noah Gragson (R)	Legacy Motor Club	Chevrolet	117	1
37	37	84	Jimmie Johnson	Legacy Motor Club	Chevrolet	115	1
Official race results

=== Race statistics ===
- Lead changes: 31 among 13 different drivers
- Cautions/Laps: 16 for 83 laps
- Red flags: 1 for 30 minutes and 48 seconds
- Time of race: 4 hours, 58 minutes, and 50 seconds
- Average speed: 120.465 miles per hour (193.870 km/h)

== Media ==
=== Television ===
Fox Sports televised the race in the United States for the 23rd consecutive year. Mike Joy was the lap-by-lap announcer, while 2012 Fall Charlotte winner Clint Bowyer, three-time NASCAR Cup Series champion and co-owner of Stewart-Haas Racing Tony Stewart, and actor Danny McBride in Stage 2 were the color commentators. Jamie Little, Regan Smith and Josh Sims reported from pit lane during the race. Larry McReynolds provided insight from the Fox Sports studio in Charlotte.

Fox
Booth announcers	Pit reporters	In-race analyst
Lap-by-lap: Mike Joy; Color-commentator: Clint Bowyer; Color-commentator: Tony Stewart; Color-commentator: Danny McBride (Stage 2)	Jamie Little; Regan Smith; Josh Sims	Larry McReynolds

=== Radio ===
Radio coverage of the race was broadcast by the Performance Racing Network (PRN), and was also simulcasted on Sirius XM NASCAR Radio. Doug Rice and Mark Garrow called the race in the booth when the field raced through the quad-oval. Rob Albright called the race from a billboard in turn 2 when the field was racing through turns 1 and 2 and halfway down the backstretch. Pat Patterson called the race from a billboard outside of turn 3 when the field raced through the other half of the backstretch and through turns 3 and 4. Brad Gillie, Brett McMillan, Wendy Venturini, and Alan Cavanna were the pit reporters during the broadcast.

PRN Radio
Booth announcers	Turn announcers	Pit reporters
Lead announcer: Doug Rice; Announcer: Mark Garrow	Turns 1 & 2: Rob Albright; Turns 3 & 4: Pat Patterson	Brad Gillie; Brett McMillan; Wendy Venturini; Alan Cavanna

== Standings after the race ==
Drivers' Championship standings

	Pos	Driver	Points
	1	Ross Chastain	446
5	2	Ryan Blaney	445 (–1)
2	3	William Byron	442 (–4)
1	4	Kevin Harvick	438 (–8)
1	5	Martin Truex Jr.	433 (–13)
4	6	Christopher Bell	429 (–17)
1	7	Tyler Reddick	409 (–37)
4	8	Denny Hamlin	400 (–46)
	9	Brad Keselowski	394 (–52)
1	10	Kyle Busch	392 (–54)
1	11	Kyle Larson	377 (–69)
1	12	Chris Buescher	368 (–78)
1	13	Ricky Stenhouse Jr.	358 (–88)
2	14	Joey Logano	357 (–89)
	15	Bubba Wallace	327 (–119)
1	16	Alex Bowman	296 (–150)
Official driver's standings

Manufacturers' Championship standings

Pos	Manufacturer	Points
1	Chevrolet	527
2	Toyota	488 (–39)
3	Ford	478 (–49)

- Note: Only the first 16 positions are included for the driver standings.
- . – Driver has clinched a position in the NASCAR Cup Series playoffs.

Previous race: 2023 Goodyear 400	NASCAR Cup Series; 2023 season	Next race: 2023 Enjoy Illinois 300
