= Ryan Blaney =

American racing driver (born 1993)

- Blaney at Las Vegas Motor Speedway in 2026
- Born: Ryan Michael Blaney; December 31, 1993 (age 32); Hartford Township, Trumbull County, Ohio, U.S.
- Height: 5 ft 7 in (1.70 m)
- Weight: 165 lb (75 kg)
- Achievements: 2023 NASCAR Cup Series Champion; 2023 Coca-Cola 600 Winner; 2022 NASCAR All-Star Race Winner; 2018 Can-Am Duel Winner; 10th driver in history to win a NASCAR race in all 3 national series at the same track (Iowa); 2011 PASS South Super Late Model Series Champion; 2010 CRA Southern Six-Pack Champion; 2009 Eastern Grand Nationals Champion
- Awards: 2009 PASS South Super Late Model Series Rookie of the Year; 2013 NASCAR Camping World Truck Series Rookie of the Year; 2014 NASCAR Camping World Truck Series Most Popular Driver

NASCAR Cup Series career
- 415 races run over 13 years
- Car no., team: No. 12 (Team Penske)
- 2026 position: 4th
- Best finish: 1st (2023)
- First race: 2014 5-hour Energy 400 (Kansas)
- Last race: 2026 Season Finale 400 (Homestead)
- First win: 2017 Axalta presents the Pocono 400 (Pocono)
- Last win: 2026 Season Finale 400 (Homestead)
Wins	Top tens	Poles
21	191	17

NASCAR O'Reilly Auto Parts Series career
- 70 races run over 8 years
- 2019 position: 83rd
- Best finish: 22nd (2015)
- First race: 2012 Virginia 529 College Savings 250 (Richmond)
- Last race: 2019 Sport Clips Haircuts VFW 200 (Darlington)
- First win: 2013 Kentucky 300 (Kentucky)
- Last win: 2018 My Bariatrics Solutions 300 (Texas)
Wins	Top tens	Poles
7	57	3

NASCAR FedEx Freight Truck Series career
- 58 races run over 4 years
- 2015 position: 81st
- Best finish: 2nd (2014)
- First race: 2012 UNOH 200 (Bristol)
- Last race: 2015 WinStar World Casino & Resort 350 (Texas)
- First win: 2012 American Ethanol 200 (Iowa)
- Last win: 2015 UNOH 200 (Bristol)
Wins	Top tens	Poles
4	40	5

ARCA Menards Series career
- 5 races run over 2 years
- Best finish: 39th (2013)
- First race: 2011 Winchester ARCA 200 presented by Federated Auto Parts (Winchester)
- Last race: 2013 Ansell ActivArmr 150 (Chicagoland)
Wins	Top tens	Poles
0	5	3

ARCA Menards Series East career
- 7 races run over 2 years
- Best finish: 23rd (2012)
- First race: 2011 Blue Ox 100 (Richmond)
- Last race: 2012 American Real TV 150 (Dover)
Wins	Top tens	Poles
0	4	0

ARCA Menards Series West career
- 2 races run over 2 years
- Best finish: 61st (2017)
- First race: 2011 Casino Arizona 125 (Phoenix)
- Last race: 2017 Carneros 200 (Sonoma)
- First win: 2011 Casino Arizona 125 (Phoenix)
Wins	Top tens	Poles
1	1	0
- Statistics up to date as of November 8, 2026.

Ryan Michael Blaney (born December 31, 1993) is an American professional stock car racing driver. He competes full-time in the NASCAR Cup Series, driving the No. 12 Ford Mustang Dark Horse for Team Penske. He is the 2023 NASCAR Cup Series champion.

A third-generation racecar driver, Blaney is the son of former NASCAR Cup Series driver Dave Blaney and the grandson of modified dirt track racer Lou Blaney. Growing up, Blaney had a very successful early racing career in quarter midget racing, Bandolero racing, and late model racing, which included Blaney winning his first quarter midget race at the age of nine, and in 2009, at the age of fifteen, competing in the Pro All Star Series late model division, finishing second in the final points standings while also winning the series' Rookie of the Year award.

Blaney began his NASCAR career, driving in select few races in both the NASCAR Nationwide Series and the Camping World Truck Series in 2011-2012 for Tommy Baldwin Racing and Penske Racing. In his first full-time NASCAR season in the Truck Series in 2013, driving for Brad Keselowski Racing, Blaney finished 6th in points while also winning the Rookie of the Year Award. The following year, Blaney finished second in the final point standings, narrowly losing the Truck Series title to Matt Crafton by twenty points. Blaney made his Cup Series debut in 2014, driving a few select races for Penske. He signed with Wood Brothers Racing in 2015, driving a limited schedule in the famed No. 21 car, and remained with the Wood Brothers for an additional two years, driving his first full-time Cup Series schedule from 2016–2017. In 2017, Blaney captured his first career Cup Series win at Pocono Raceway and finished ninth in the final point standings.

In 2018, Blaney joined Team Penske full-time, driving the No. 12 Ford Mustang Dark Horse. Since joining Penske, Blaney has never finished outside the top-ten in the final championship standings in the Cup Series, which includes Blaney winning the 2023 NASCAR Cup Series championship, and nearly winning back-to-back titles the following year in 2024, when he finished runner up in the final point standings to his Penske racing teammate Joey Logano. Blaney is the winner of the 2022 NASCAR All-Star Race, and has currently amassed a total of 21 Cup Series victories, including a crown jewel victory in the 2023 Coca-Cola 600.

== Racing career ==
=== Early racing career ===
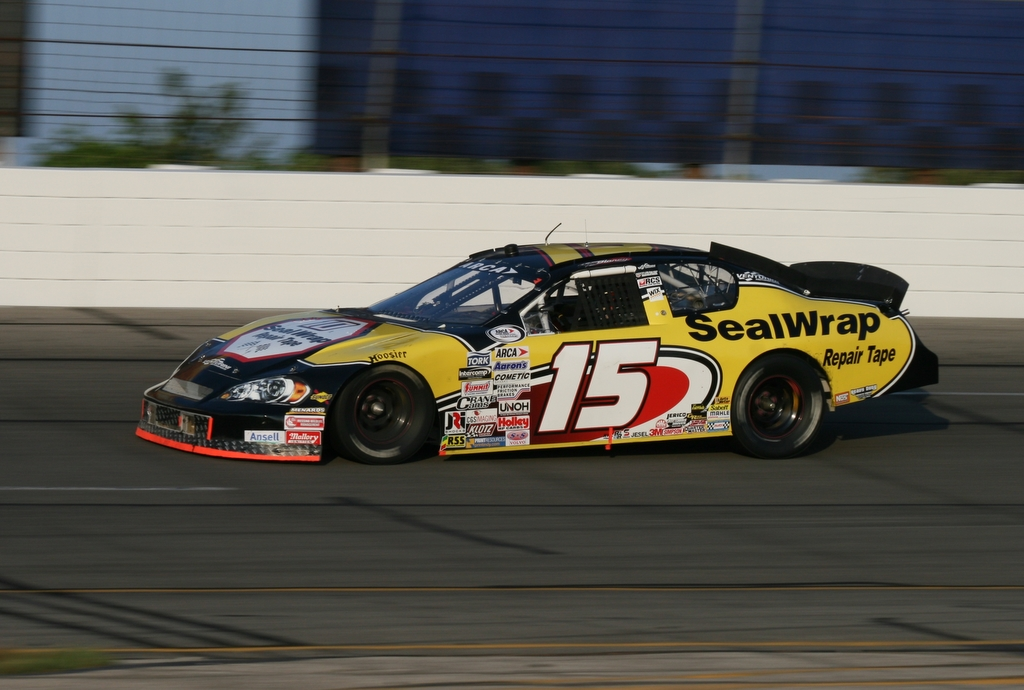
Blaney's 2011 ARCA car at IRP

A third-generation racer and son of then-Cup Series driver Dave Blaney, Blaney started his racing career in quarter midget racing, winning his first race at the age of nine; he also competed, and won, in Bandolero cars at a young age. Moving up to Legends cars at the age of twelve, Blaney won the Lowe's Motor Speedway Summer Shootout and the Young Lions Winter Heat Points Championship, as well as three divisions of the Carolina Fall Nationals in quarter midgets. He also won the Concord Speedway Young Lions Winter Heat Points Championship in Bandoleros.

At the age of twelve, Blaney debuted in late model racing at Orange County Speedway, while in 2009, at the age of fifteen, he began competing in the Pro All Stars Series (PASS)-sanctioned South Super Late Model Series, finishing second in points and winning the series' Rookie of the Year award; he finished third in the PASS national points as well. In addition, he won the Eastern Grand Nationals in Huntsville, Alabama and the Gasoline Alley National Championship quarter midget event in Indianapolis, Indiana.

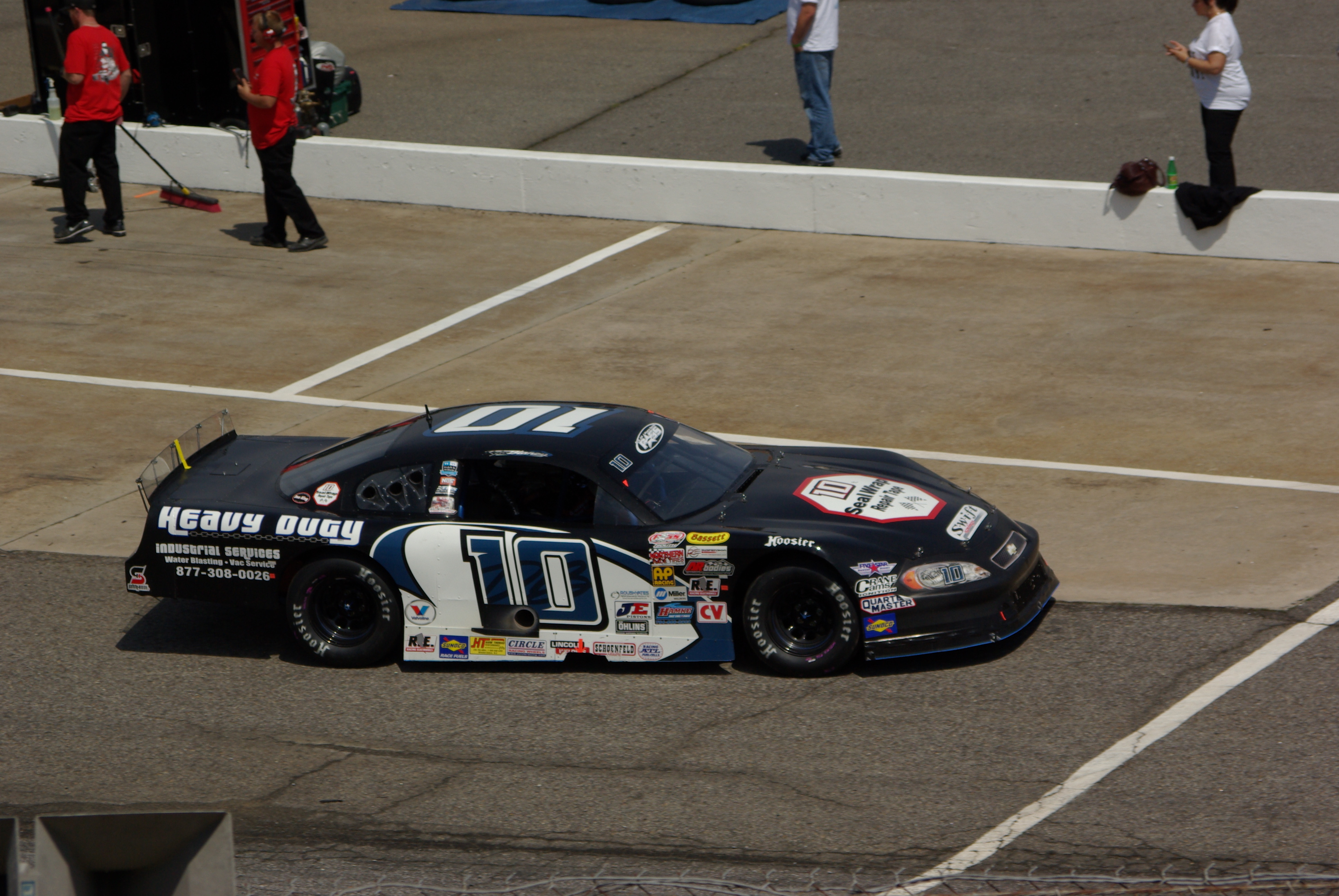
Blaney's 2011 PASS car at North Wilkesboro

Continuing to compete in the PASS South Super Late Model Series in 2010, Blaney scored his first career win in the series at Dillon Motor Speedway, adding wins at Greenville-Pickens Speedway and Newport Speedway on his way to a second consecutive second-place finish in the PASS South championship standings. Blaney also competed in the Champion Racing Association (CRA)-sanctioned Southern Six Pack series, winning the series championship for 2010. Returning to the PASS South Super Late Model Series in 2011, Blaney won two races in the series, at Dillon Motor Speedway and Ace Speedway, winning the series championship.

For 2012, Blaney returned to the PASS Super Late Model Series in the Carswell Motorsports No. 98 car.

=== NASCAR ===
==== K&N Pro Series and ARCA (2011–2013) ====
In 2011, Blaney made his debuts in the ARCA Racing Series and the NASCAR K&N Pro Series West and East in 2011, scoring top ten finishes in every start in the three series; he won his first career NASCAR race in the K&N Pro Series West season finale at Phoenix International Raceway winning by over two seconds in his only series start.

For 2012, Blaney, who had won praise from Tony Stewart and Kevin Harvick for his driving skills, returned to the K&N Pro Series East, running six races for family-owned DB Racing, driving the No. 10 car.

==== Xfinity and Trucks (2012–2015) ====
In addition, Blaney signed with Tommy Baldwin Racing to compete in six NASCAR Nationwide Series races, driving the No. 36 SealWrap-sponsored Chevrolet, starting at Richmond International Raceway in April. Blaney qualified in the top ten in his debut at Richmond International Raceway, and finished seventh in the race.

In July 2012, Blaney announced that he had signed a contract to drive for Team Penske a minimum of three races in the 2012 Nationwide Series season, starting at Iowa Speedway in August. He also ran selected races in the Camping World Truck Series for Brad Keselowski Racing, finishing sixth in his debut in the series at Bristol Motor Speedway. Blaney won his first career Truck Series race on September 15, 2012, at Iowa Speedway; at the time, he was the youngest winner in Truck Series history at eighteen years, eight months, and fifteen days. The previous record was twenty years and eighteen days set by Kyle Busch in 2005. (Note: The current youngest NASCAR national touring series winner is Cole Custer, who won at New Hampshire Motor Speedway in September 2014 at sixteen years, seven months, and 28 days.)

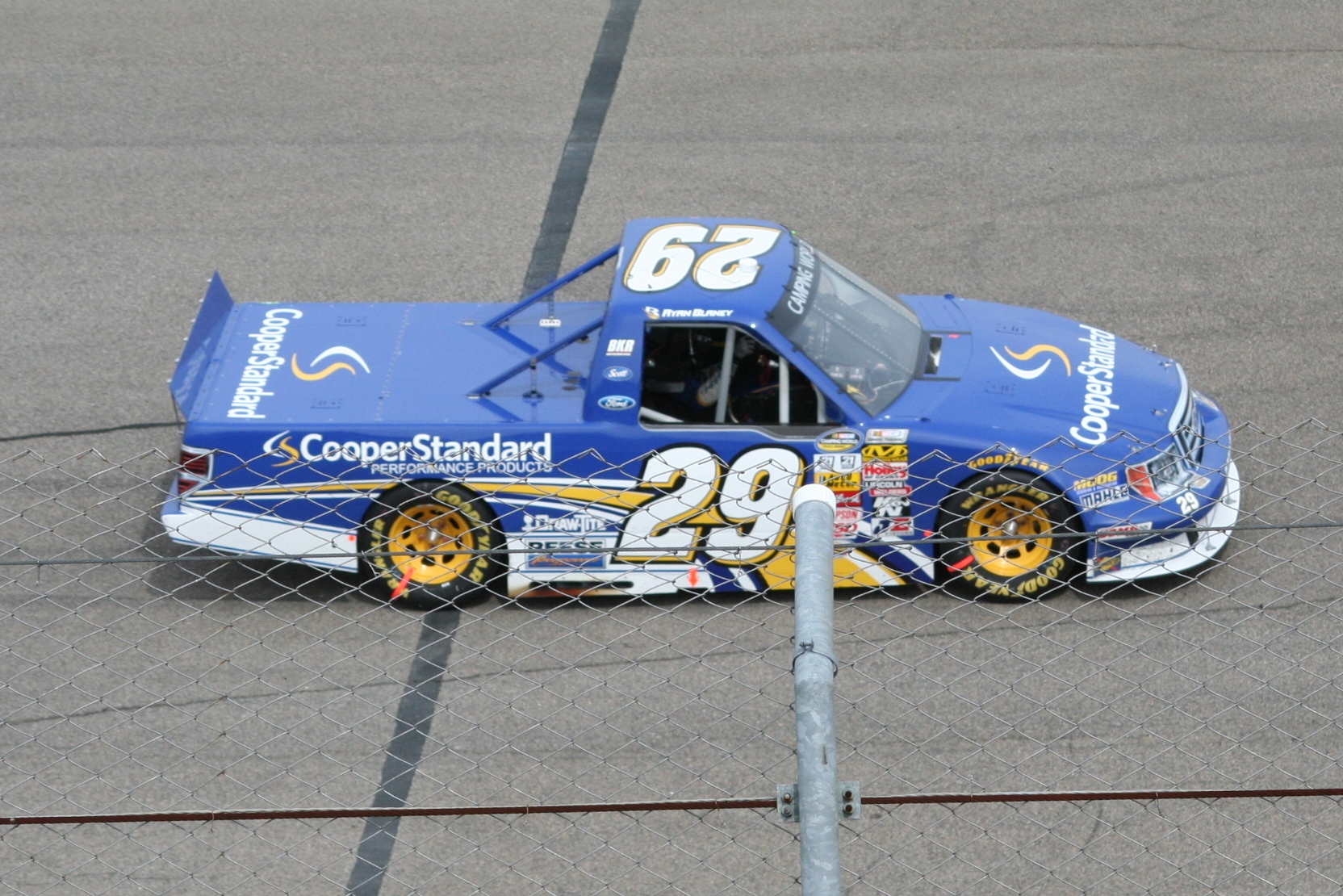
Blaney's 2013 truck at Rockingham

Blaney returned to the Camping World Truck Series in 2013, driving the full schedule for Brad Keselowski Racing and competing for the series' Rookie of the Year award. Blaney won his first career pole in the series at Kentucky Speedway in June, then won his second career Truck Series race at Pocono Raceway in August. Blaney also competed in the Nationwide Series at Iowa Speedway in June, substituting for Joey Logano after a rainout created a schedule conflict; Blaney finished ninth in the event. Blaney competed in a second Nationwide Series race in 2013, at Kentucky Speedway on September 21, and led 96 of the race's 200 laps to win his first career race in the series, beating Austin Dillon and Matt Crafton. Blaney was the only race winner in the 2013 Nationwide season to not have any Sprint Cup experience.

In January 2014, Blaney announced that, in addition to a full Camping World Truck Series schedule with BKR, he would be running fifteen Nationwide Series and two Sprint Cup Series races for Team Penske during the year.

Blaney drove the No. 29 truck full-time for Brad Keselowski Racing. He had many Top 10s but failed to win in the spring. However, his year's turning point was at Dover in late May 2014, when he came up short to Kyle Busch, who beat him by 0.5 (one car length) seconds for the win. After the race, Blaney was one of the drivers who said that because Kyle was winning a lot in the truck series, the Cup series drivers should no longer race in any division besides the Cup Series.

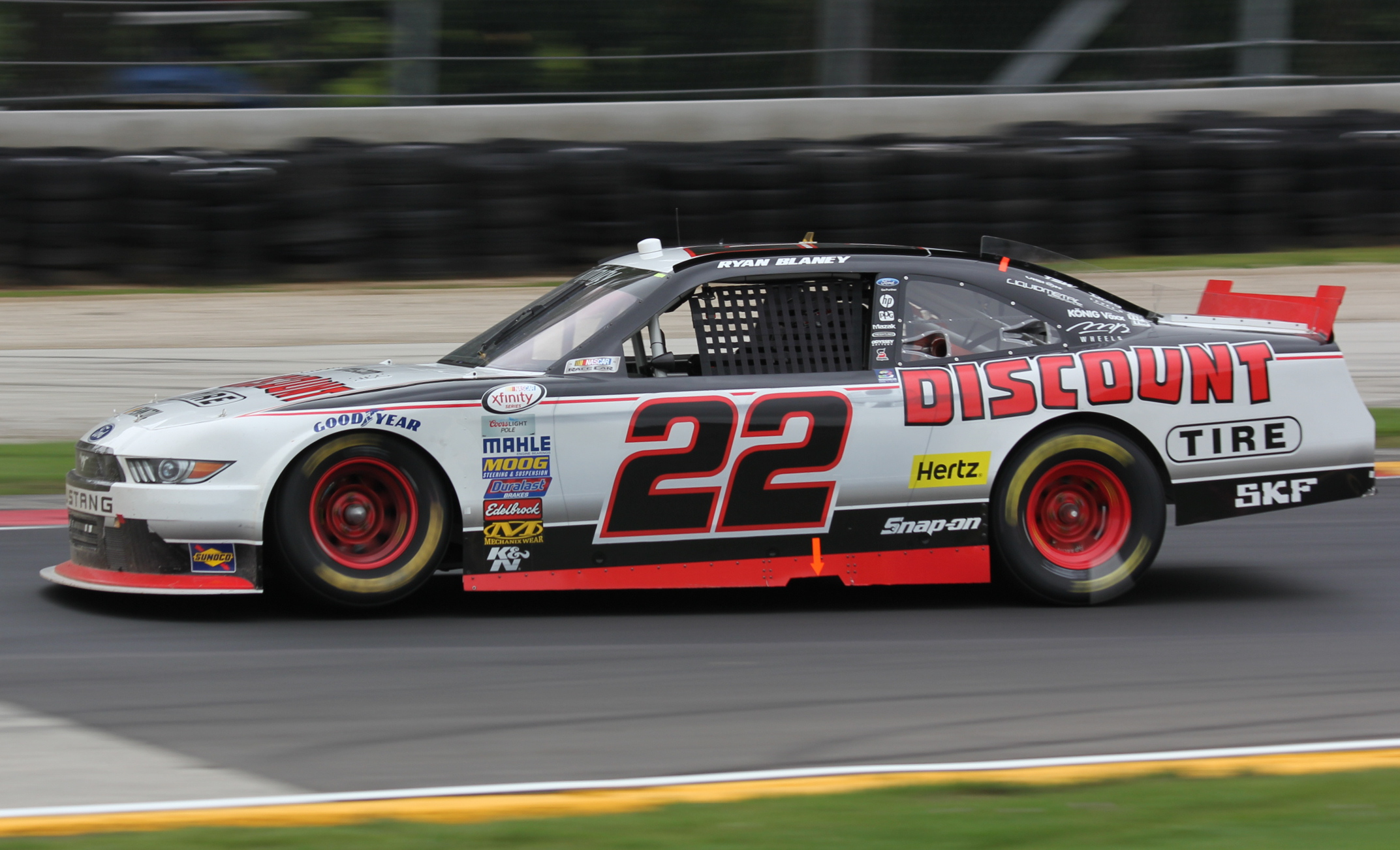
Blaney's 2015 Xfinity car at Road America

Blaney won his second career Nationwide race in August 2014 at Bristol Motor Speedway, beating Kyle Busch in a green-white-checkered finish. The next week, Blaney won his first Truck race of 2014 spectacularly at Ron Fellows' own Canadian Tire Motorsports Park raceway, edging German Quiroga by 0.49 seconds in a photo-finish.

In 2015, Blaney began his Xfinity Series schedule in Las Vegas in the Boyd Gaming 300. After leading two laps, he was briefly in contention for the win. After spinning out fellow driver Erik Jones late in the race, Blaney restarted the final restart in eighth place. Despite this, he drove from eighth to second in the final 21 laps. Though he caught up to race leader Austin Dillon with three laps to go, Blaney was unable to force his way by Dillon. Blaney finished second to Dillon by a three-car-length winning difference. He nearly won at Indianapolis Motor Speedway in the Xfinity race, finishing second to Kyle Busch after being passed on the final lap. He won at Iowa and nearly won at Road America in his debut on the track. He again won at the Kentucky standalone race in September, beating Ty Dillon on a late-race restart. Blaney got his second top-ten of his career in the Sprint Cup at Kansas for the Hollywood Casino 400, finishing seventh.

==== Cup Series (2014–present) ====
===== Team Penske (2014) =====
====== 2014: Limited exposure ======
In January 2014, it was announced that Team Penske was going to re-open a third car, the No. 12, for Blaney to make two starts in during the 2014 NASCAR Sprint Cup season. He made his debut at Kansas Speedway, finishing 27th. His second start came at Talladega in the fall, where he notched a 22nd-place finish.

===== Wood Brothers Racing (2015–2017) =====
====== 2015: Part-time conquest ======
In August 2014, it was announced that Blaney was to run twenty Sprint Cup Series races for Wood Brothers Racing in the No. 21 Ford during the 2015 NASCAR Sprint Cup Series season. Blaney performed well, picking up his first Top 10 at Talladega in the GEICO 500, running as high as second and finishing fourth. He didn't qualify for three races due to rainouts. He picked up a seventh-place finish in the fall at Kansas and ended the year with fifteen starts in total.

====== 2016: Rookie year and first full-time season ======
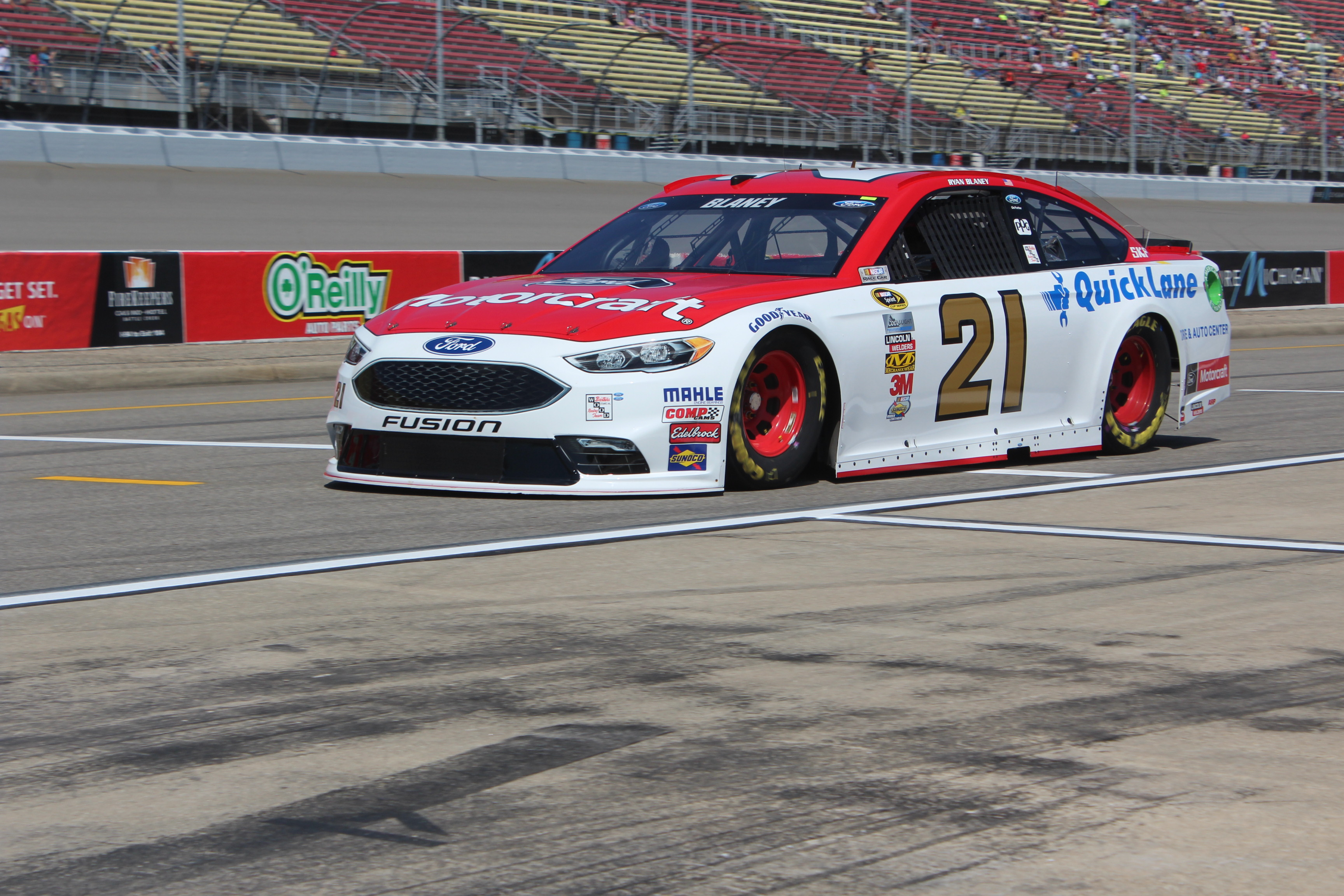
Blaney during practice for the 2016 Pure Michigan 400

Blaney began competing full-time in the Cup Series in 2016 with the Wood Brothers despite the team being excluded from NASCAR's new Charter system implemented before the 2016 Cup Series season. He got his third top-ten of his career at Las Vegas, finishing sixth. Before the race at Auto Club Speedway, Blaney and close friend Bubba Wallace drove together from Phoenix to Fontana and stole the headlines one evening when they took over NASCAR's Snapchat account and filmed themselves mimicking drivers such as Carl Edwards, Danica Patrick, and Paul Menard. Blaney picked up more top tens at Phoenix, Talladega, Dover, and Pocono for a successful first half of the season with his best finish being a fifth at Kansas. At Chicagoland, Blaney ran well all day, and for the final restart, he gambled and stayed out, and got the race lead. However, on the restart, Martin Truex Jr. overtook him easily due to having fresher tires and held on to get the win, with Blaney finishing fourth. He put up a fight for the Sunoco Rookie of the Year award, but lost to Chase Elliott.

====== 2017: Breakout season ======
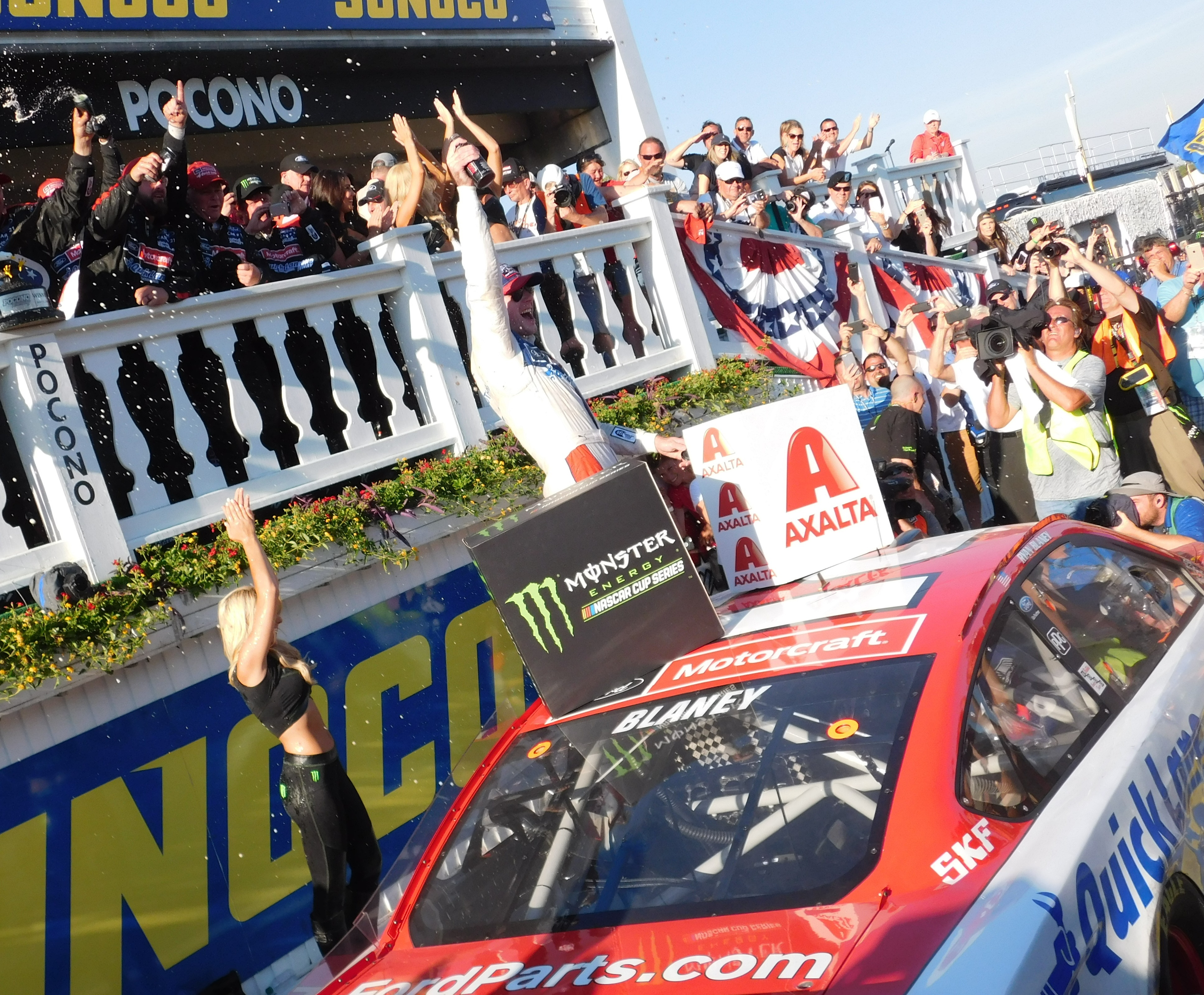
Blaney celebrating after winning the 2017 Axalta presents the Pocono 400

In 2017, fellow single-car team Go Fas Racing announced that they would loan their charter to the No. 21 Wood Brothers team, guaranteeing Blaney a spot in every race of the 2017 season. During the Daytona 500, Blaney, despite being caught up in an early wreck, charged from fifth on the final lap to place second to Kurt Busch. Blaney had a better race in April at Texas Motor Speedway, qualifying second to Kevin Harvick. He then passed Harvick early in the race to lead the next 148 laps and win the first two stages. However, a late-race pit stop error cost Blaney the race. He recovered from his mishap and finished twelfth. At Kansas, Blaney won his first career Cup Series pole. The race was primarily a duel between him and Martin Truex Jr.. After battling Truex for three restarts, Truex pulled away to win the race while Blaney finished fourth.

In June, he won his first career Cup race at the Axalta presents the Pocono 400 at Pocono Raceway. After passing Kyle Busch with ten laps to go, he held off Harvick to claim the victory, qualifying him for the playoffs. On July 26, Blaney announced he would move to Team Penske's new No. 12 car for the 2018 season. At the end of the regular season, Blaney entered the playoffs ninth in points, courtesy of his win at Pocono and three stage wins.

During his playoff run, Blaney made it into the Round of 8, highlighted by a third-place finish in the Round of 12 race at Kansas, despite having to start last after his car failed post-qualifying inspection. Blaney then scored consecutive top-ten finishes at Martinsville and Texas, but despite winning the pole for the Round of 8 finale at Phoenix, he faded outside of the top ten by the end of stage one. He rebounded to secure eighth by the end of stage two, but could not improve his standing on the track, ultimately finishing the race in seventeenth and being eliminated from the playoffs. Blaney wound up finishing 29th in the season finale at Homestead–Miami, securing a ninth-place finish in the final Cup Series standings with his one win, four top fives, fourteen top tens, four stage wins, and two poles. His ninth-place points finish was also the highest for a driver for the Wood Brothers since Morgan Shepherd finished sixth in the final Cup standings in 1994.

===== Team Penske (2018–present) =====
====== 2018: Tough luck at Daytona and Roval win ======
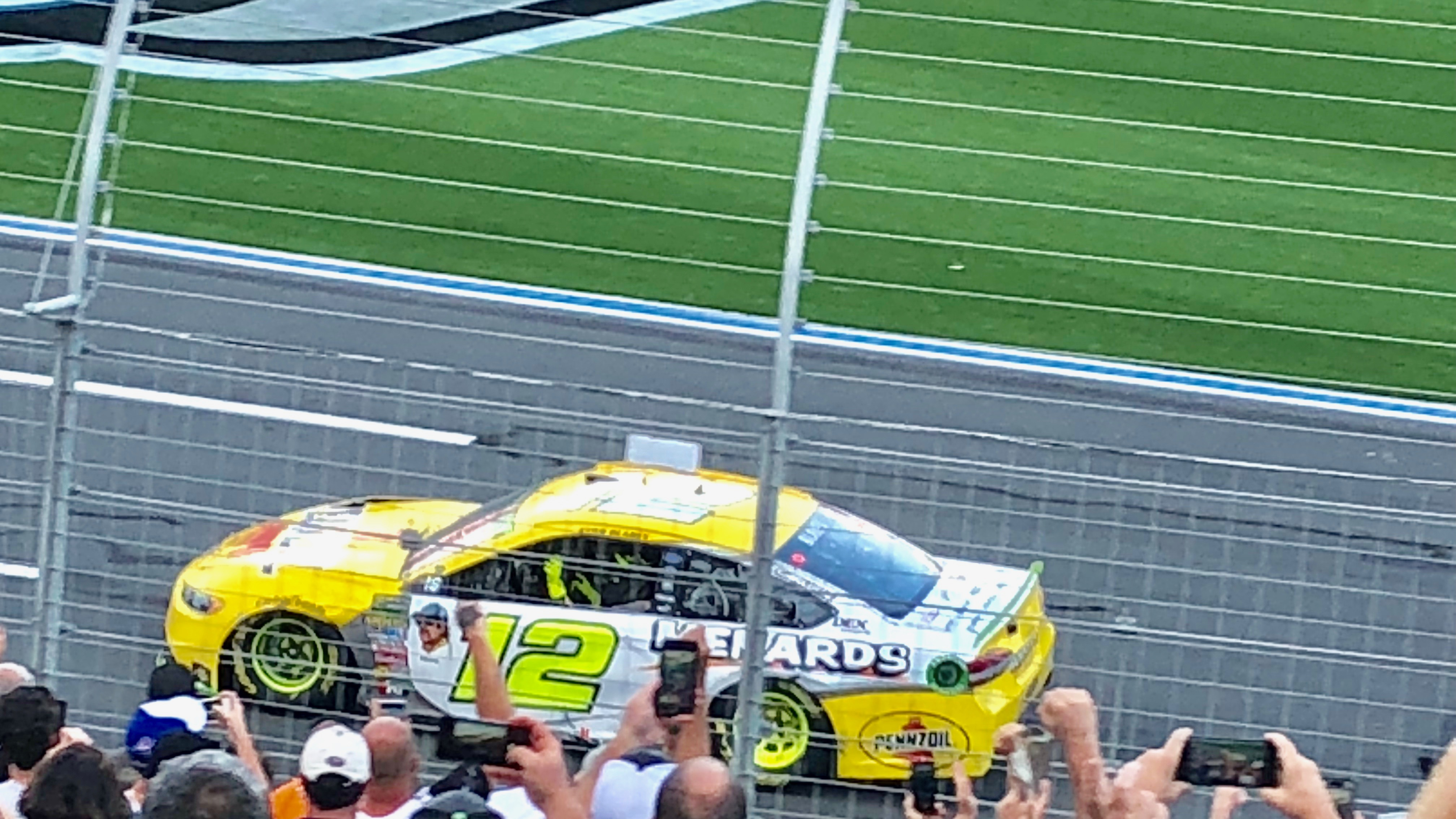
Blaney after winning the 2018 Bank of America Roval 400

For his tenure at Team Penske, it was announced that he John Menard Jr. and Menards, which sponsors the team's IndyCar operations, were signed to a primary sponsorship deal. He also brought over personal sponsorship from BodyArmor sports drink. Blaney won his Can-Am Duel and was a favorite to win the Daytona 500. He led the most laps on the day, spending 114 laps, over half the race, leading the pack. He finished seventh after contact with Kurt Busch late in the race forced him to pit for repairs.

Blaney won the pole at Las Vegas, won a stage at Martinsville, and appeared to have the car to beat early on at Bristol, but was involved in a large crash near the end of stage one. Blaney once again fell short at Kansas and blew an engine in the Coca-Cola 600 at Charlotte. Blaney won another pole at Pocono and finished in the top ten; He did the same the following week at Michigan. Returning to Daytona in July was not kind to Blaney, as he could not replicate his success from the 500, being caught up in The Big One and finishing in last place.

A run of good finishes to round out the summer stretch, none lower than fifteenth, put Blaney in the playoffs despite going winless in the regular season, as he managed to put together a strong coalition of five top-fives, twelve top-tens, and five stage wins. Blaney ran solidly at Las Vegas and Richmond, putting him barely over the cutoff line going into the Bank of America Roval 400 at the Charlotte Roval. While running in third on the last lap, leaders Martin Truex Jr. and Jimmie Johnson wrecked each other going into the final chicane. Blaney passed both to score his first win of the season and his first win with Team Penske. The win advanced him to the Round of 12, where he was eliminated after the fall Kansas race and finished the season tenth in points.

====== 2019: Consistent winning form ======
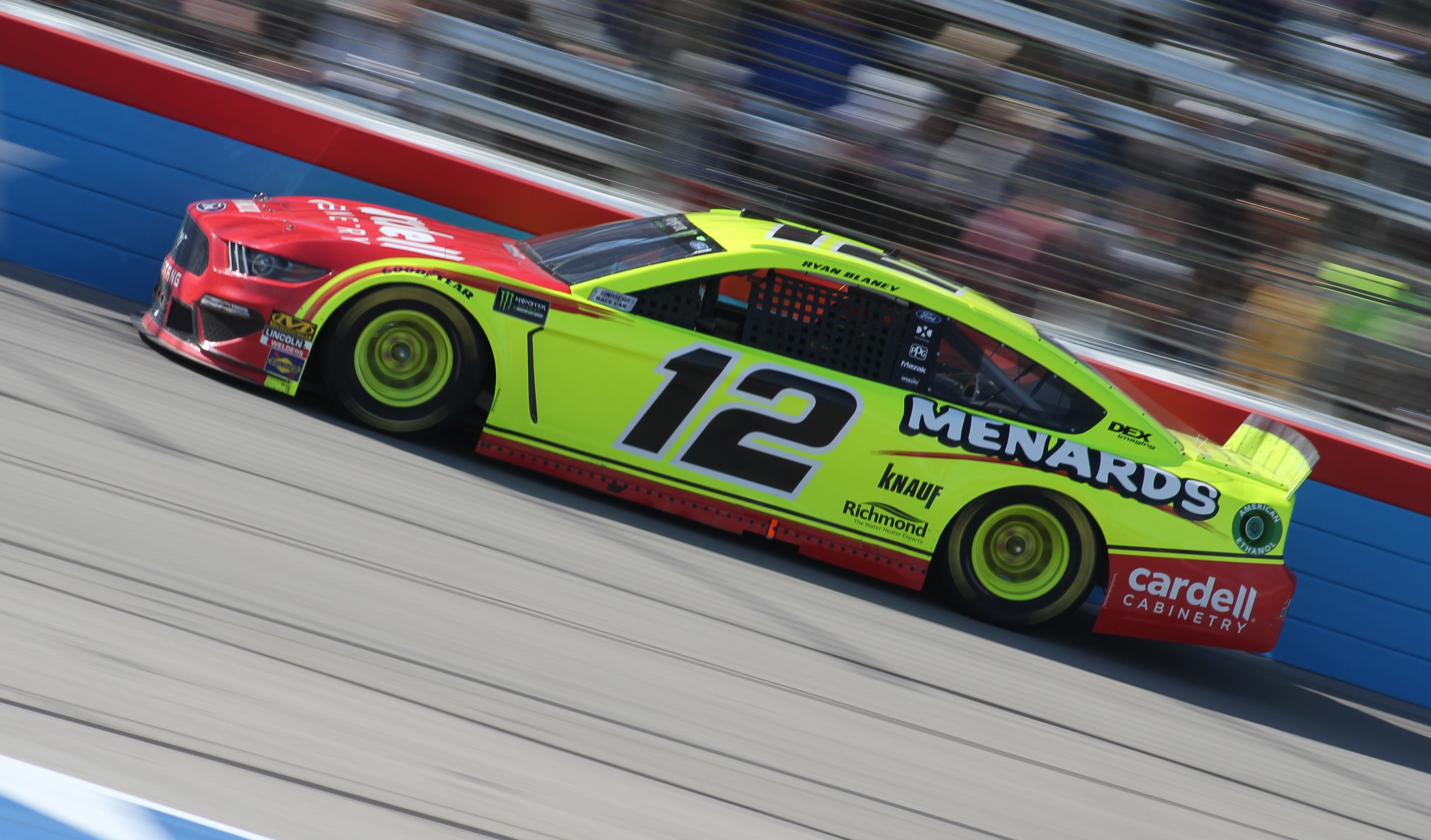
Blaney racing at Texas Motor Speedway in 2019

Blaney remained consistent within the top-ten in points in 2019. At Watkins Glen, he spun Jimmie Johnson out of contention, leading to an argument between the two after the race. The animosity between them lasted until Michigan a week later. At the Charlotte Roval, Blaney finished eighth to advance to the Round of 12. Blaney won the Talladega fall race in a photo finish of 0.007 seconds over Ryan Newman and advanced into the Round of 8, despite an early spin onto pit road. Despite finishing third at Phoenix, he was eliminated in the Round of 8.

====== 2020: Early playoff exit ======
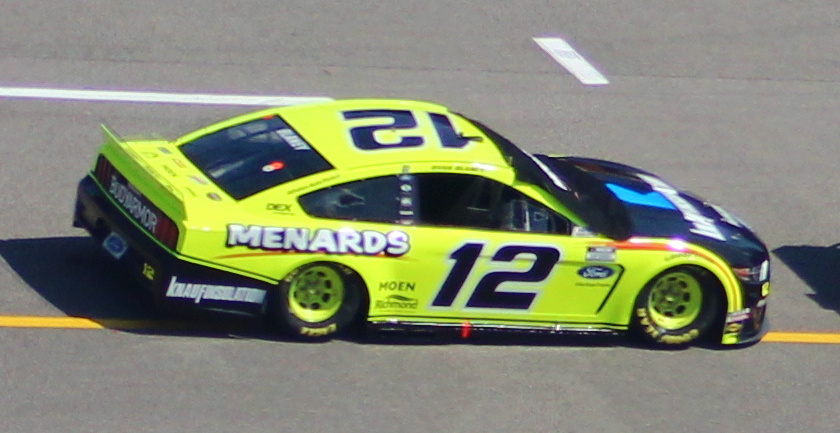
Blaney's No. 12 car at Michigan International Speedway in 2020

On the final lap of the 2020 Daytona 500, Blaney gave a push to leader Ryan Newman, sending him into the outside wall and into a violent crash. Blaney lost the race to Denny Hamlin in the second-closest finish in Daytona 500 history. Blaney later stated that the incident had taken a tough toll on him mentally, and that speaking with Newman on the phone after his release from the hospital was a key factor in helping him come to peace with it. Blaney crashed out at Phoenix, and have mediocre runs at both Darlington races before two back-to-back third places in the doubleheader races at Charlotte paved the way for a consistent streak. He dominated early at Bristol, leading 60 laps, before a wreck with Ty Dillon resulted in a last place finish. For the next four weeks, Blaney recorded three straight top-fives, capping it off with a win at the GEICO 500, defeating Ricky Stenhouse Jr. by 0.007, his second photo-finish win at Talladega.

He had transmission issues at Kentucky, forcing him to drive through the turns one-handed because his car kept jumping out of fourth gear. Nonetheless, he held the lead for a small part of the final lap but hit a drain on the apron, finishing sixth. Blaney led the most laps at Texas and finished fourth at Michigan, putting up a strong coalition of runs going into the playoffs.

Blaney made the playoffs with his win at Talladega, but was eliminated in the Round of 16 due to mediocre finishes at Richmond and the Bristol Night Race. Blaney put up a strong fight at the end of the season despite his elimination, with three top-fives and two-top tens in the last five races of the season, with a highest of second at Martinsville. Blaney finished the season ninth in points.

====== 2021: First multi-win season ======
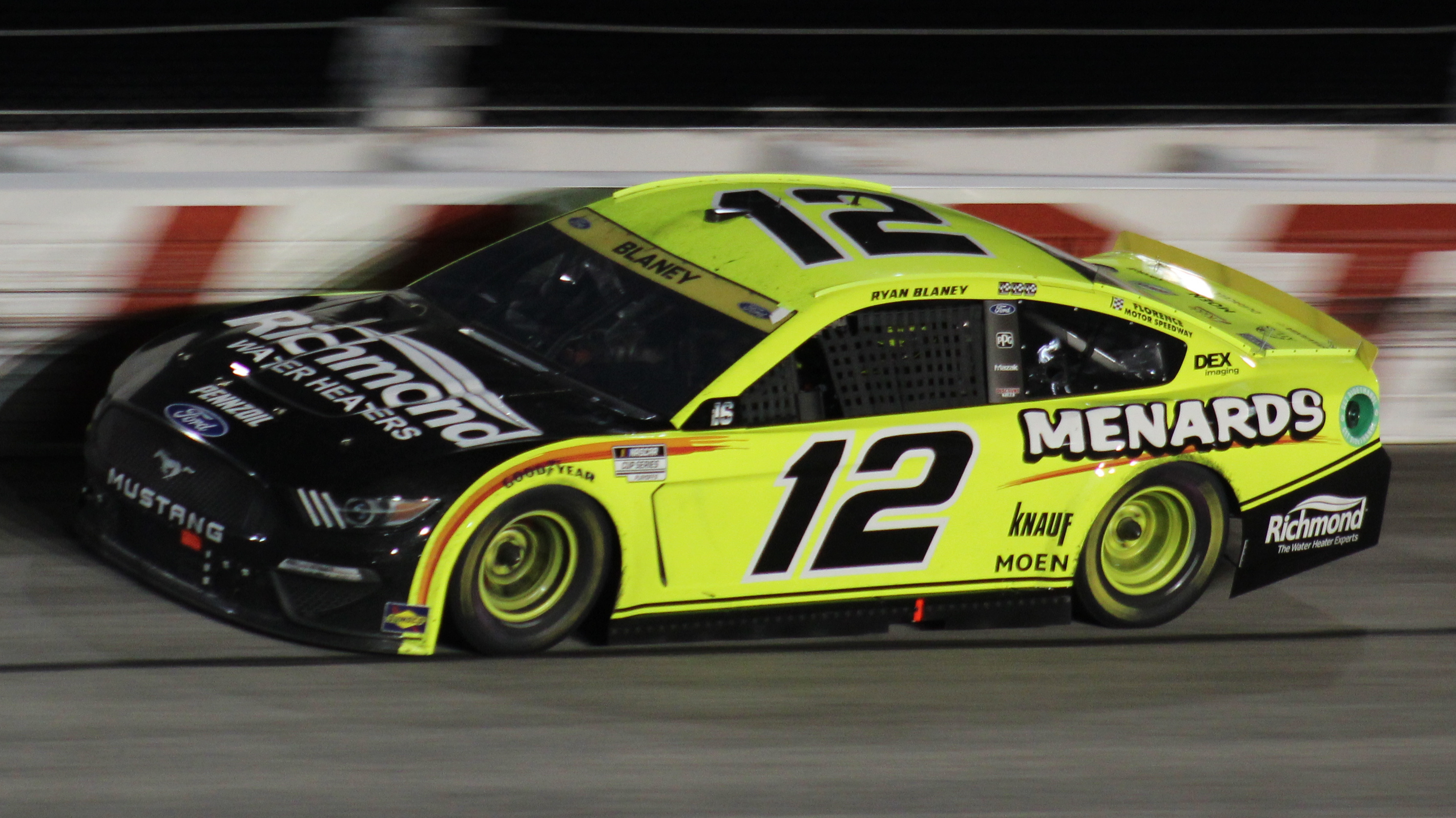
Blaney in the No. 12 at Darlington Raceway in 2021

During the 2021 season, Blaney won at Atlanta and Michigan, scoring his fifth and sixth career wins in the series, respectively. The Atlanta win was emotional for Blaney as it came twenty years after his dad almost won the same race, only to lose because of a broken wheel. For the first time in his career, Blaney had back-to-back wins after he won the last race of the regular season at Daytona International Speedway the following week. Both wins gave him his sixth and seventh career wins. After only winning four races in the five seasons before 2021, Blaney captured three wins in the Cup Series regular season. He went into the 2021 Cup playoffs as the second-seeded driver with three wins on the season behind Kyle Larson, who had five wins. Blaney made it to the Round of 8 before being eliminated after Martinsville. He finished the season seventh in the points standings.

====== 2022: Winless ======
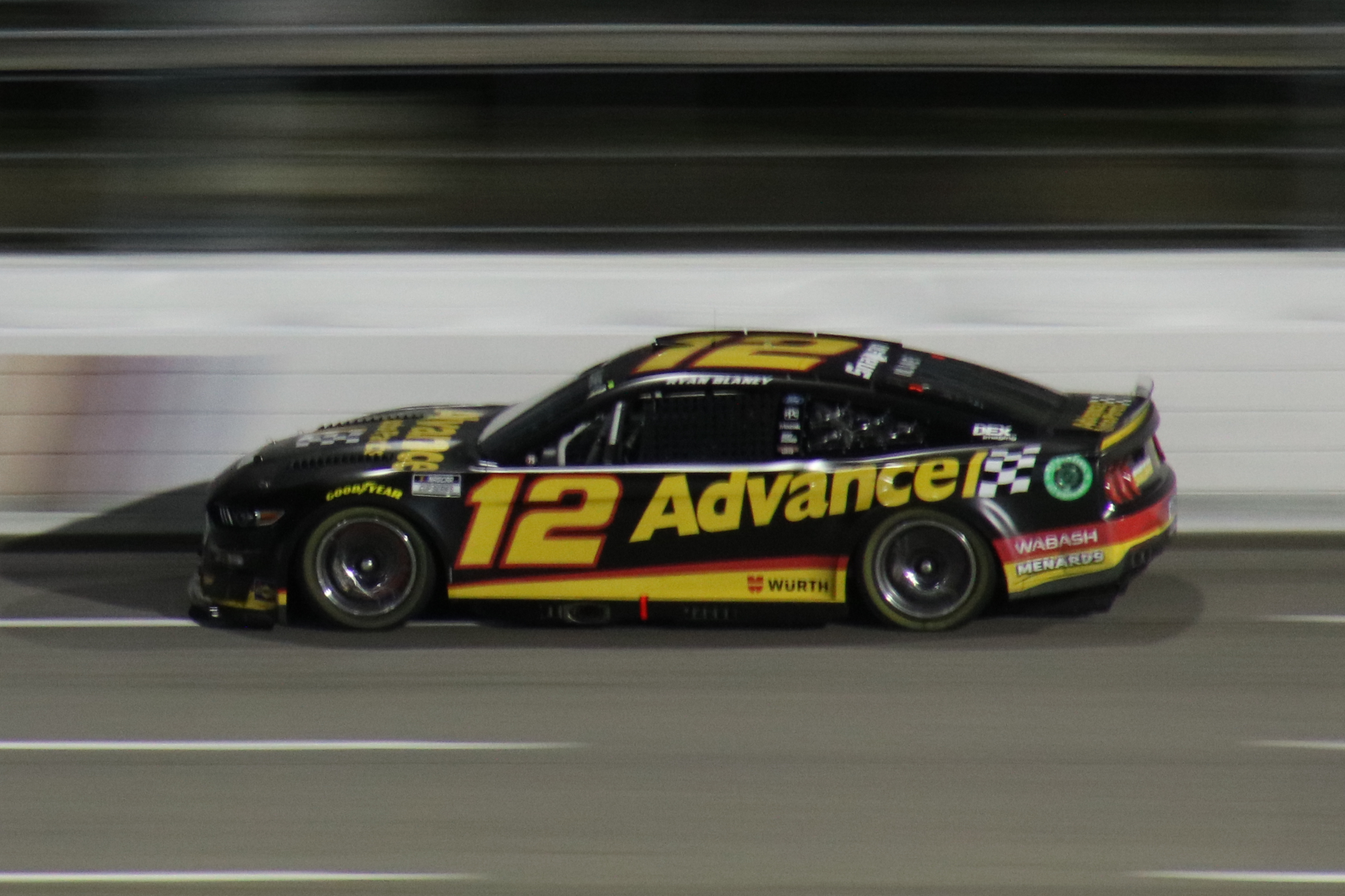
Blaney in the No. 12 at Martinsville Speedway in 2022

Blaney started the 2022 season with a fourth-place finish at the 2022 Daytona 500. Despite scoring no wins in the first thirteen races, he stayed consistent with four top-fives and six top-ten finishes. He would lead the most laps at Talladega and be in position for a race win, but would fall short after being involved in the Big One on the last lap. He also won the 2022 NASCAR All-Star Race. Despite being involved in a multi-car crash on lap 31 of the regular season finale at the Daytona night race, Blaney rallied to finish fifteenth to clinch the sixteenth and final playoff spot of the season, beating Martin Truex Jr. by three points. Blaney was eliminated following the Round of 8 after finishing third at Martinsville. Despite being winless, he finished the season eighth in the points standings.

====== 2023: Championship season ======
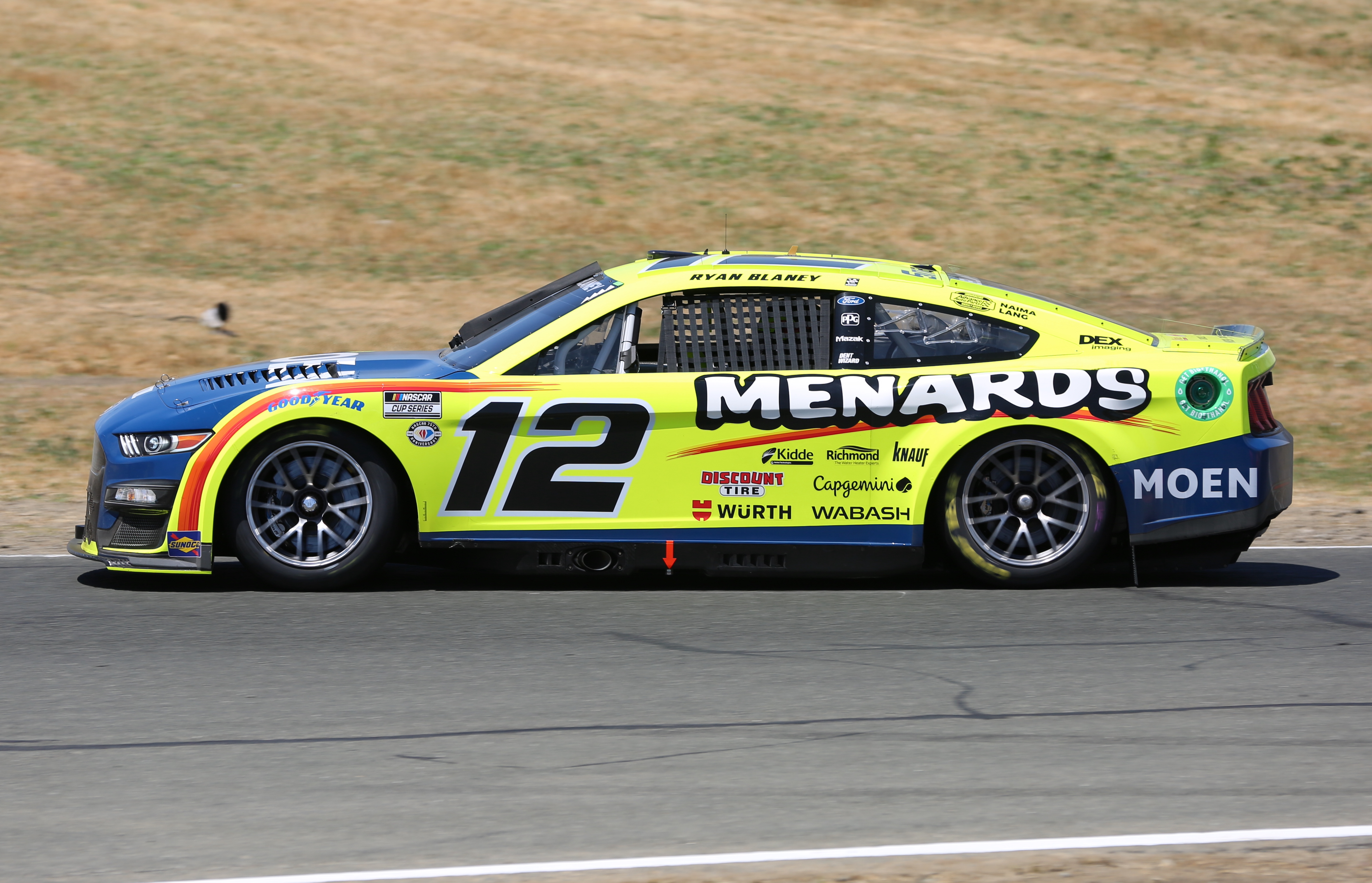
Blaney's No. 12 car at Sonoma Raceway in 2023.

Blaney started the 2023 season with an eighth place finish at the 2023 Daytona 500 despite getting caught in a wreck early. Blaney found himself within striking distance of the win at Phoenix a few weeks later but finished second after a late restart. At Bristol in April, Blaney would be his Cup teammate, Joey Logano's spotter for the Weather Guard Truck Race on Dirt. Logano won his Heat Race and the Main Event. He led the most laps at the GEICO 500 at Talladega, but finished second to Kyle Busch on an overtime restart after a bad block from Bubba Wallace. He finally broke his 59-race drought by winning the 2023 Coca-Cola 600, doing such in a dominating fashion by leading the most laps and winning a stage. A sixth place finish the next week at Gateway put Blaney on top of the points standings.

A poor performance the next week at Sonoma was followed by a scary moment at Nashville; Blaney had a violent impact into the inside wall of turn one, leaving him suffering with concussion-like symptoms. He later went on to say that he felt it was the hardest impact he has felt in his entire racing career. Blaney urged NASCAR to install a SAFER barrier on the wall that he impacted, a sentiment that was echoed by NASCAR's Vice President of Competition Elton Sawyer. Two weeks later at Atlanta, Blaney won stage one and finished second in stage two. He was one of several drivers attempting to stay in the lead until a caution for rain came out, but wound up finishing ninth. The remainder of the summer stretch was mediocre for Blaney with two more ninth-place finishes at Michigan and Watkins Glen being his only top-tens. In the regular-season finale at Daytona, Blaney charged to the front late in the second stage but was involved in a hard crash from the lead after Ty Gibbs was turned by Christopher Bell, causing The Big One.

During the playoffs, Blaney advanced through the first round after solid runs at Darlington and Kansas, earning stage points in both. Blaney was caught up in an accident with twelve laps to go at Texas, putting his hopes of advancing to the Round of 8 in jeopardy. Blaney won his way into the next round at Talladega, in a photo finish with Kevin Harvick, the margin of victory being 0.012 seconds. He finished sixth at Las Vegas, but was disqualified after post-race inspection discovered a left-front damper that did not meet specifications; as a result, Blaney dropped to last-place and the bottom of the Round of 8 cutoff line. NASCAR later rescinded the penalty and restored Blaney's points after an issue was found with the damper template. A second-place finish at Homestead–Miami would propel Blaney to ten points above the playoff cutline entering Martinsville, the first time in his career he would enter the penultimate race of a season above the cutline. He traded the lead back and forth with Denny Hamlin for most of the race, but won stage two and held off a late-charging Aric Almirola to get his third win of the season and lock himself into the Championship 4.

The season finale at Phoenix was a fierce competition between Blaney, Bell, William Byron, and Kyle Larson. Blaney ran in the top ten for the majority of the race, but an early brake failure for Bell allowed Blaney to get a big run on the Hendrick teammates. On Lap 277, Blaney slammed into the rear end of leader Ross Chastain to go three wide for the race lead, but a spin by Kyle Busch bunched up the field for a final restart with 30 laps to go. Larson and Blaney ran side-by-side, dueling for position for nearly eleven laps before Blaney passed Larson for second place with twenty laps to go. He hung on to finish second, clinching the 2023 NASCAR Cup Series Championship.

====== 2024: Championship defense ======
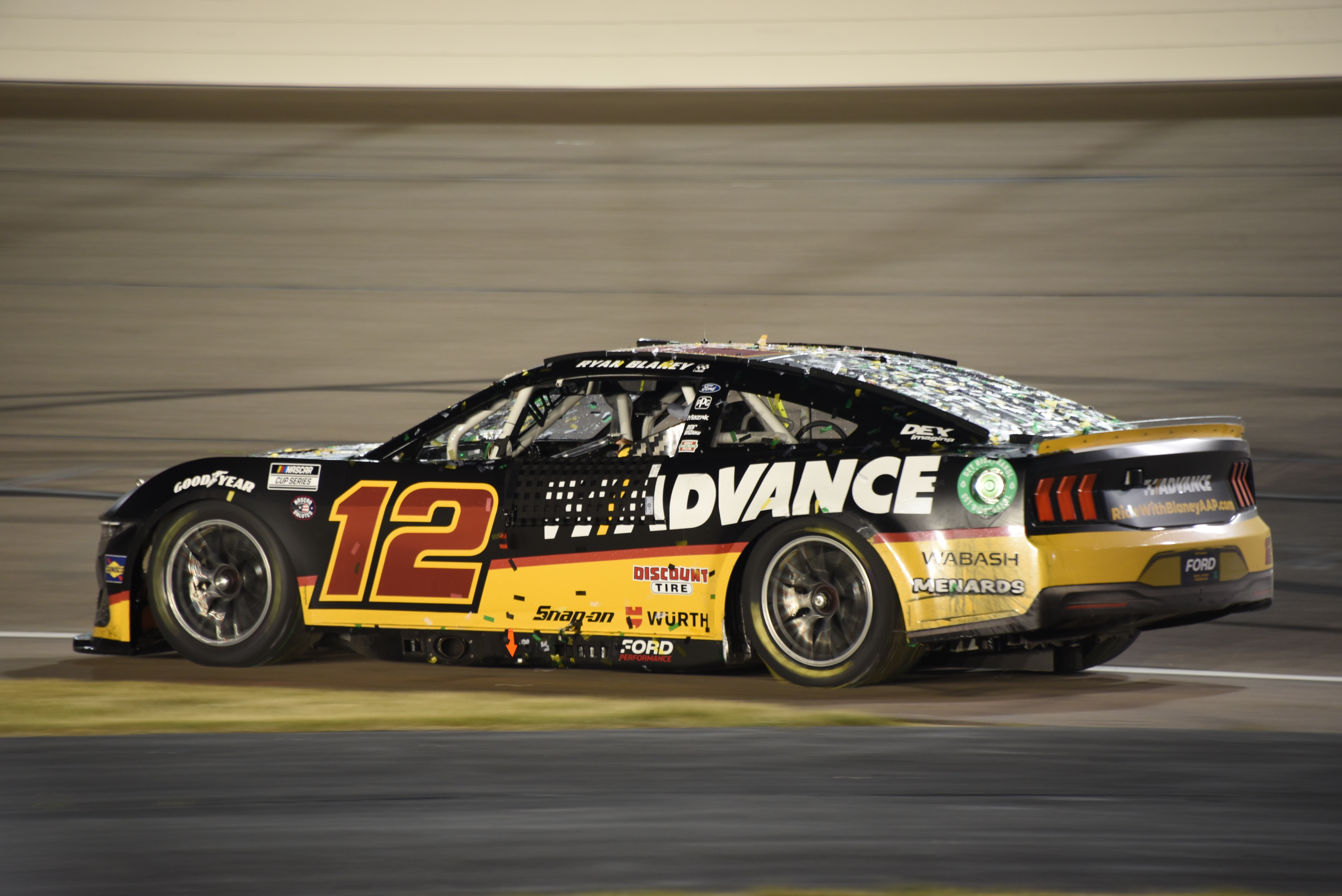
Blaney after winning the 2024 Iowa Corn 350

Blaney started the 2024 season with a 30th-place DNF at the Daytona 500. At Atlanta, he was leading the last lap but ultimately finished in second and came 0.003 seconds short of beating Daniel Suárez in a three-wide photo finish between him, Suárez, and Kyle Busch. Blaney once again fell short of a victory at Gateway after running out of fuel on the last lap; his teammate Austin Cindric ended up winning the race. On June 16, He scored his first win of the season at the inaugural Iowa race. A month later, he won at Pocono, just over seven years after his first Cup Series win at the same track. During the playoffs, Blaney advanced to the Round of 8, where after a narrow loss to Tyler Reddick at Homestead–Miami, he would win at Martinsville to make the Championship 4 for a second year in a row. Blaney ran up front for the bulk of the season finale race at Phoenix, though would be unable to outrun his Team Penske teammate Joey Logano, who would go on to win the 2024 Cup Series Championship.

====== 2025: Championship contention ======
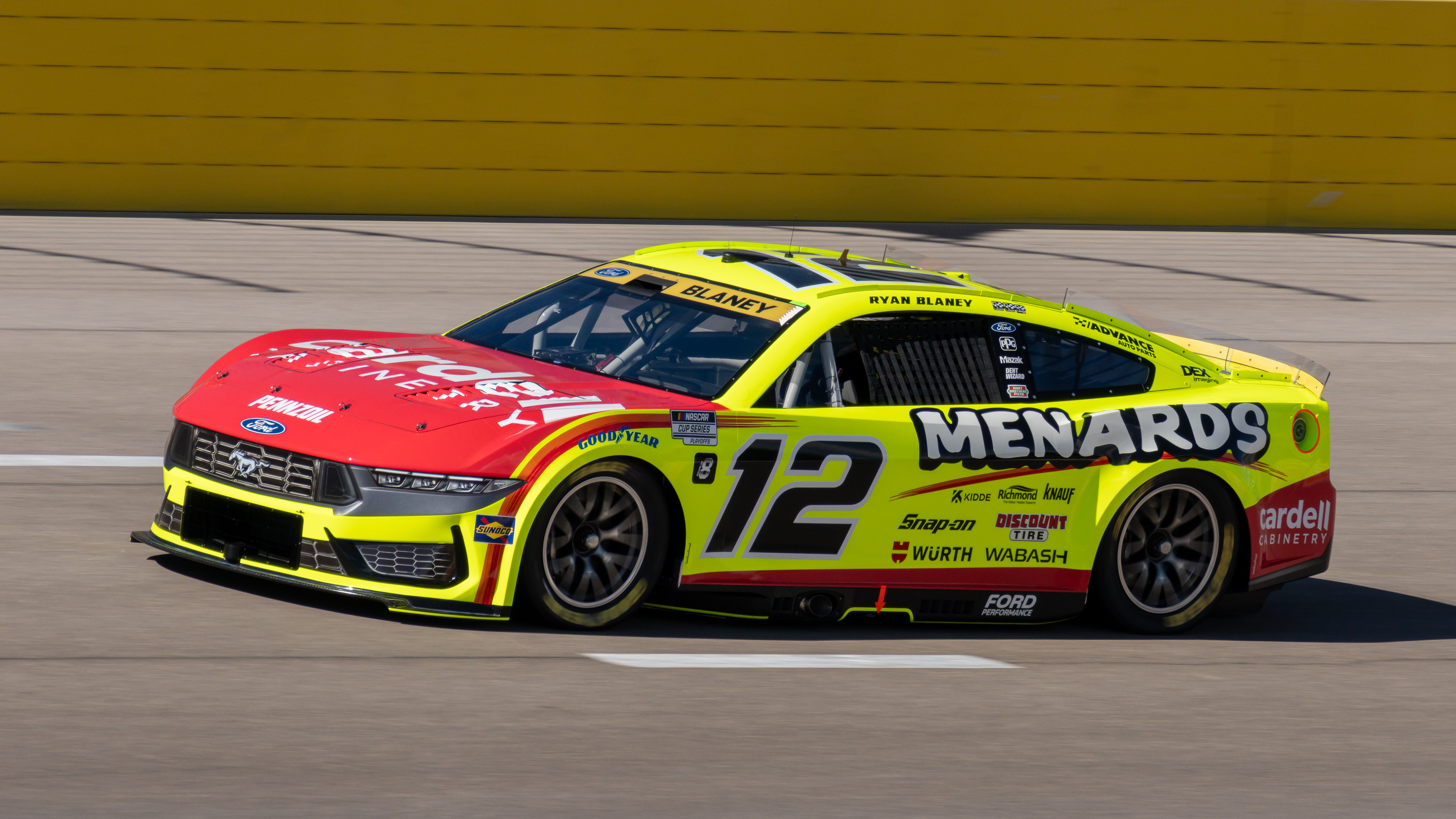
Blaney's No. 12 Ford at Las Vegas Motor Speedway in 2025.

Blaney started the 2025 season with a seventh-place finish at the Daytona 500. He scored his first win of the season at Nashville. He ended the regular season with a win at the Daytona summer race, edging out Daniel Suárez by 0.031 seconds. During the playoffs, he won at New Hampshire. Despite being eliminated at the conclusion of the Round of 8, Blaney finished the season with a win at Phoenix and sixth in the points standings.

====== 2026: Summer consistency, post-race fight ======
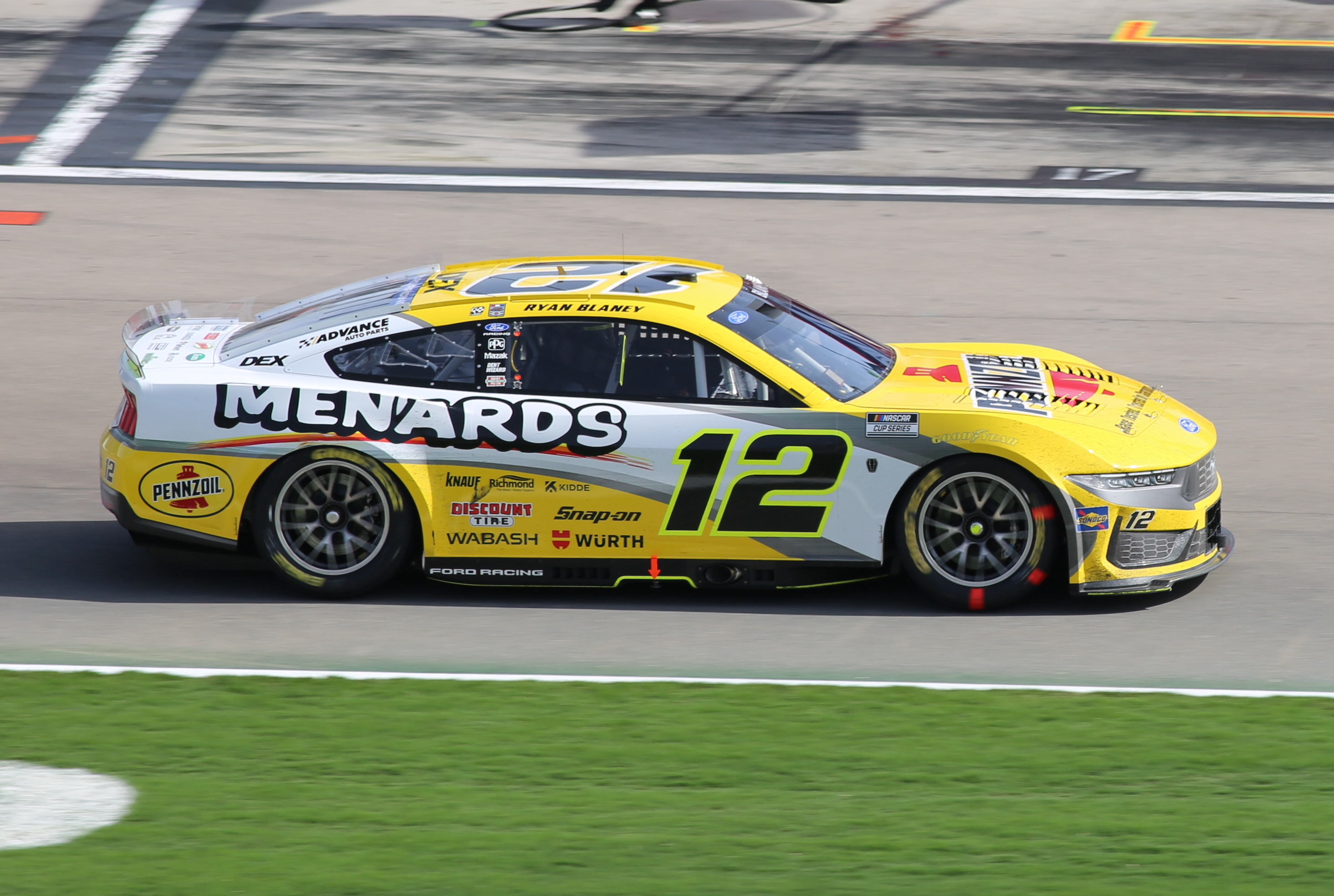
Blaney's No. 12 Ford at Las Vegas Motor Speedway in 2026.

Blaney started the 2026 season with a 27th-place DNF at the Daytona 500. Three weeks later, he scored his first win of the season at Phoenix. Blaney would later win the pole at Bristol. Blaney signed a contract extension with Team Penske on May 6. He went on an 8-race top-10 streak beginning at Charlotte and including a win at Atlanta. The streak came to an end with an 11th place finish at North Wilkesboro. He earned his second-straight win at New Hampshire. At the Bristol Night Race on lap 458, Blaney was spun by Carson Hocevar after the race Blaney went over to Hocevar and fought. Blaney concluded the season by winning the season finale at Homestead, passing 4 drivers in the final restart. Blaney claimed his first win at Homestead–Miami Speedway, finishing 4th in the standings.

== In media ==
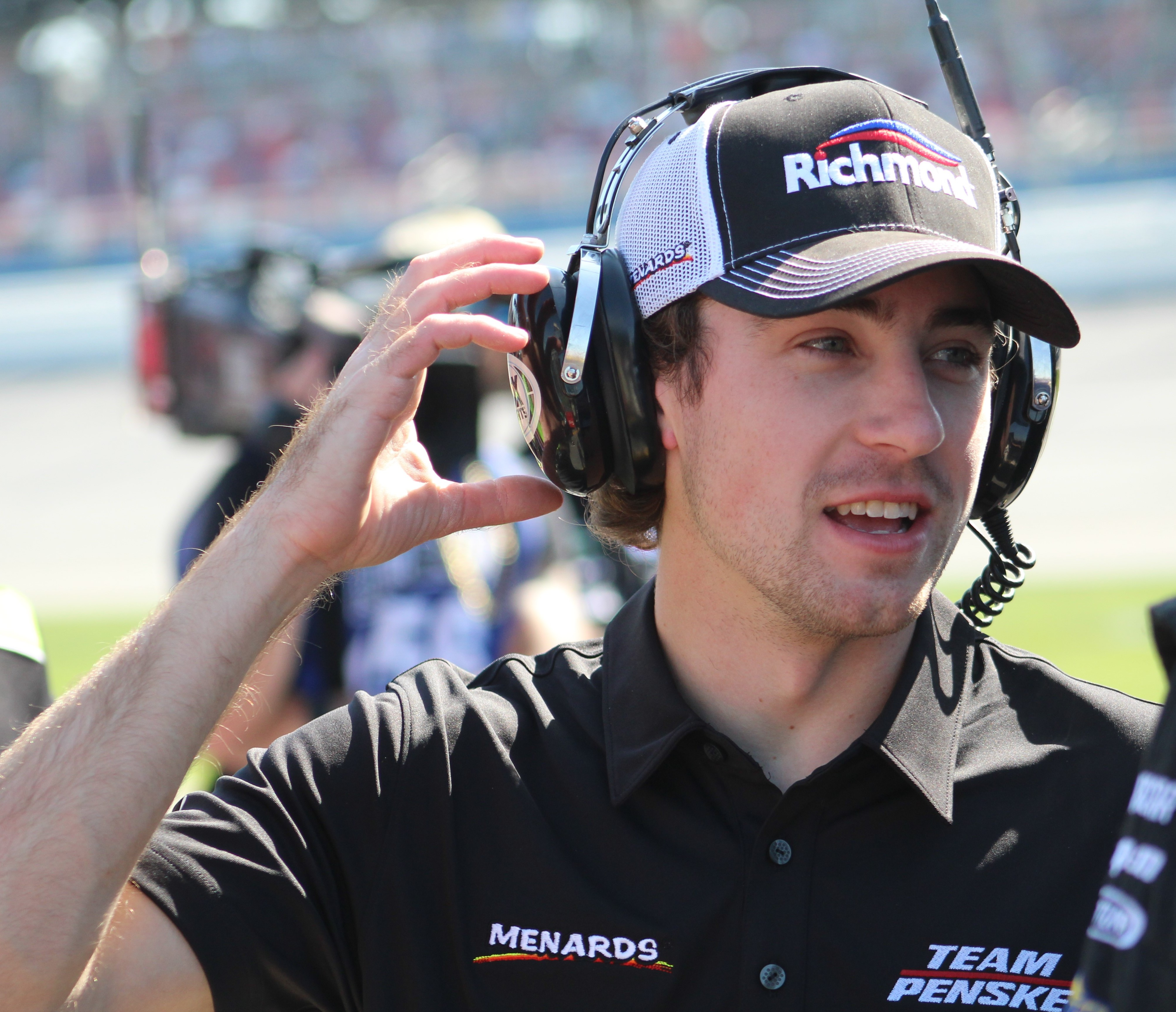
Blaney participating in the driver-only broadcast at the 2018 Xfinity Talladega race

At the beginning of the 2017 season, Blaney began a NASCAR-supported podcast featuring former Miss Sprint Cup and current Motor Racing Network personality Kim Coon and NASCAR.com analyst Chuck Bush, called the Glass Case of Emotion. The podcast ended at the conclusion of the 2023 season.

In June 2017, Blaney became a member of Fox NASCAR's Cup driver-only broadcast team for the Xfinity Series race at Pocono Raceway, working as a pit reporter alongside Erik Jones and Ricky Stenhouse Jr. He also interviewed race-winner Brad Keselowski; the next day, the roles were reversed as he won his first Cup race with Keselowski, still in his firesuit, interviewing him. The driver-only broadcast format returned for the 2018 Xfinity race at Talladega Superspeedway as Blaney returned to his pit duties. Since 2021, Blaney has served as a commentator in the booth for the driver-only broadcast, as well as a rotating driver analyst in the booth for regular Xfinity and ARCA Menard Series broadcasts.

Blaney has made numerous guest-starring/cameo appearances in TV and film throughout his career. In 2017, Blaney voiced Ryan "Inside" Laney in the Pixar film Cars 3. That same year Blaney also had a cameo appearance as a delivery boy in the film Logan Lucky. In 2018, Blaney guest-starred in the TV show Taken in season 2 episode 12 "Imperium", as Special Agent Nathan Wood; the episode aired on April 20, 2018. Blaney also guest-starred as Shane Powell in an episode of the CBS reboot Magnum P.I., and as Overdrive, a villainous racing driver, in the Spider-Man episode "Bring on the Bad Guys". In 2019, Blaney had a cameo appearance as himself in the Netflix's television series The Crew alongside Austin Dillon and Cole Custer.

In 2021, Blaney was one of three drivers featured as cover stars for the NASCAR 21: Ignition video game. He also appeared on the NASCAR 25 cover, and helped curate the soundtrack for the game.

Blaney was a featured driver in the 2022 USA Network series Race for the Championship, following the 2022 NASCAR Cup Series season, as well as the 2024 Netflix documentary series NASCAR: Full Speed, which followed the 2023 NASCAR Cup Series Playoffs.

== Personal life ==
Blaney is the only son and middle child of Lisa and Dave Blaney, with two sisters, Emma and Erin. He is of Irish descent and is close friends with fellow drivers Bubba Wallace, Erik Jones, William Byron and Chase Elliott. Blaney is also an avid Star Wars and Trailer Park Boys fan.

Blaney has multiple tattoos, including a Star Wars inspired piece on his right leg, a sprint car on his left side, and the #10 in red on the left side of his chest in tribute to the number he ran most often growing up.

Blaney is married to model Gianna Tulio; the couple has a son.

== Motorsports career results ==
=== Racing career summary ===
Season	Series	Team	Races	Wins	Top 5	Top 10	Points	Position
2011	NASCAR K&N Pro Series West	Dave Blaney	1	1	1	1	185	63rd
2011	NASCAR K&N Pro Series East	Dave Blaney	2	0	0	2	276	38th
2011	ARCA Racing Series	Venturini Motorsports	2	0	1	2	460	50th
2012	NASCAR Whelen Modified Tour	Allan Heinke	1	0	0	0	11	52nd
2012	NASCAR K&N Pro Series East	Dave Blaney	5	0	2	2	146	23rd
2012	NASCAR Camping World Truck Series	Brad Keselowski Racing	9	1	2	5	258	26th
2012	NASCAR Nationwide Series	Tommy Baldwin Racing	6	0	0	2	0	NC†
2012	NASCAR Nationwide Series	Penske Racing	7	0	1	5	0	NC†
2013	ARCA Racing Series	Cunningham Motorsports	3	0	3	3	690	39th
2013	NASCAR Camping World Truck Series	Brad Keselowski Racing	22	1	8	13	726	6th
2013	NASCAR Nationwide Series	Penske Racing	3	1	1	3	0	NC†
2014	NASCAR Camping World Truck Series	Brad Keselowski Racing	22	1	12	17	812	**2nd**
2014	NASCAR Nationwide Series	Team Penske	14	1	10	13	0	NC†
2014	NASCAR Sprint Cup Series	Team Penske	2	0	0	0	0	NC†
2015	NASCAR Camping World Truck Series	Brad Keselowski Racing	5	1	4	5	0	NC†
2015	NASCAR Xfinity Series	Team Penske	13	2	9	10	461	22nd
2015	NASCAR Sprint Cup Series	Wood Brothers Racing	16	0	1	2	0	NC†
2016	NASCAR Xfinity Series	Team Penske	8	0	4	6	0	NC†
2016	NASCAR Sprint Cup Series	Wood Brothers Racing	36	0	3	9	812	20th
2017	NASCAR K&N Pro Series West	Troy Cline	1	0	0	0	18	61st
2017	NASCAR Xfinity Series	Team Penske	13	2	12	12	0	NC†
2017	Monster Energy NASCAR Cup Series	Wood Brothers Racing	36	1	4	14	2305	9th
2018	NASCAR Xfinity Series	Team Penske	4	1	4	4	0	NC†
2018	Monster Energy NASCAR Cup Series	Team Penske	36	1	8	16	2298	10th
2019	NASCAR Xfinity Series	Team Penske	2	0	2	2	0	NC†
2019	Monster Energy NASCAR Cup Series	Team Penske	36	1	11	18	2339	7th
2020	NASCAR Cup Series	Team Penske	36	1	11	17	2336	9th
2021	NASCAR Cup Series	Team Penske	36	3	11	20	2350	7th
2022	SRX Series	N/A	1	0	0	1	14	18th
2022	NASCAR Cup Series	Team Penske	36	0	12	17	2354	8th
2023	NASCAR Cup Series	Team Penske	36	3	8	18	5035	**1st**
2024	NASCAR Cup Series	Team Penske	36	3	12	18	5035	**2nd**
2025	NASCAR Cup Series	Team Penske	36	4	15	19	2373	6th
2026	NASCAR Cup Series	Team Penske	36	4	12	23	2407	4th

=== NASCAR ===
(key) (Bold – Pole position awarded by qualifying time. Italics – Pole position earned by points standings or practice time. * – Most laps led.)

==== Cup Series ====
NASCAR Cup Series results
Year	Team	No.	Make	1	2	3	4	5	6	7	8	9	10	11	12	13	14	15	16	17	18	19	20	21	22	23	24	25	26	27	28	29	30	31	32	33	34	35	36	NCSC	Pts	Ref
2014	Team Penske	12	Ford	DAY	PHO	LVS	BRI	CAL	MAR	TEX	DAR	RCH	TAL	KAN; 27	CLT	DOV	POC	MCH	SON	KEN	DAY	NHA	IND	POC	GLN										TAL; 22	MAR	TEX	PHO	HOM	60th	0^{1}	
2014	Wood Brothers Racing	21	Ford																							MCH; QL^{†}	BRI	ATL	RCH	CHI	NHA	DOV	KAN	CLT						60th	0^{1}	
2015	Wood Brothers Racing	21	Ford	DAY; 39	ATL	LVS; 19	PHO	CAL	MAR	TEX; 42	BRI	RCH	TAL; 4	KAN	CLT; 42	DOV	POC	MCH; 24	SON	DAY; DNQ	KEN; DNQ	NHA; 23	IND; 12	POC	GLN	MCH; 24	BRI; 22	DAR; 30	RCH	CHI; DNQ	NHA	DOV	CLT; 14	KAN; 7	TAL; 43	MAR	TEX; 43	PHO	HOM; 17	52nd	0^{1}	
2016	Wood Brothers Racing	21	Ford	DAY; 19	ATL; 25	LVS; 6	PHO; 10	CAL; 35	MAR; 19	TEX; 29	BRI; 11	RCH; 28	TAL; 9	KAN; 5	DOV; 8	CLT; 20	POC; 10	MCH; 17	SON; 23	DAY; 14	KEN; 35	NHA; 11	IND; 36	POC; 11	GLN; 19	BRI; 35	MCH; 4	DAR; 13	RCH; 39	CHI; 4	NHA; 12	DOV; 38	CLT; 31	KAN; 14	TAL; 11	MAR; 19	TEX; 12	PHO; 8	HOM; 26	20th	812	
2017	Wood Brothers Racing	21	Ford	DAY; 2	ATL; 18	LVS; 7	PHO; 23	CAL; 9	MAR; 25	TEX; 12*	BRI; 33	RCH; 36	TAL; 39	**KAN**; 4	CLT; 24	DOV; 32	POC; 1	MCH; 25	SON; 9	DAY; 26	KEN; 10	NHA; 19	IND; 23	POC; 30	GLN; 8	MCH; 15	BRI; 10	DAR; 31	RCH; 18	CHI; 11	NHA; 9	DOV; 23	CLT; 8	TAL; 18	KAN; 3	MAR; 8	TEX; 6	**PHO**; 17	HOM; 29	9th	2305	
2018	Team Penske	12	Ford	DAY; 7*	ATL; 12	**LVS**; 5	PHO; 16	CAL; 8	MAR; 3	TEX; 5	BRI; 35	RCH; 22	TAL; 18	DOV; 8	KAN; 37	CLT; 36	**POC**; 6	MCH; 8	SON; 34	CHI; 18	DAY; 40	KEN; 2	NHA; 7	POC; 12	GLN; 12	MCH; 5	BRI; 7*	DAR; 15	IND; 11	LVS; 5	RCH; 19	ROV; 1	DOV; 11	TAL; 29	KAN; 7	MAR; 20	**TEX**; 2	PHO; 34	HOM; 17	10th	2298	
2019	Team Penske	12	Ford	DAY; 31	ATL; 22	LVS; 22	**PHO**; 3	CAL; 5	MAR; 4	TEX; 37	BRI; 4*	RCH; 25	TAL; 15	DOV; 15	KAN; 32	CLT; 13	POC; 12	MCH; 9	SON; 3	CHI; 6	DAY; 36	KEN; 13	NHA; 4	POC; 10	GLN; 5	MCH; 24	BRI; 10	DAR; 13	IND; 7	LVS; 5	RCH; 17	ROV; 8	DOV; 35	TAL; 1*	KAN; 21	MAR; 5	TEX; 8	PHO; 3	HOM; 11	7th	2339	
2020	Team Penske	12	Ford	DAY; 2	LVS; 11	CAL; 19	PHO; 37	DAR; 16	DAR; 21	CLT; 3	CLT; 3	BRI; 40	ATL; 4	MAR; 2	HOM; 3	TAL; 1*	POC; 12	POC; 22	IND; 32	KEN; 6	TEX; 7*	KAN; 20	NHA; 20	MCH; 4	MCH; 38	DRC; 31	DOV; 14	DOV; 12	DAY; 6	DAR; 24	RCH; 19	BRI; 13	LVS; 7	TAL; 25	ROV; 5	KAN; 7	TEX; 4	MAR; 2	PHO; 6	9th	2336	
2021	Team Penske	12	Ford	DAY; 30	DRC; 15	HOM; 29	LVS; 5	PHO; 10	ATL; 1	BRD; 8	MAR; 11	RCH; 11	TAL; 9	KAN; 21	DAR; 8	DOV; 12	COA; 17	CLT; 13	SON; 10	NSH; 37	POC; 5	POC; 6	ROA; 20	ATL; 5	NHA; 5	GLN; 14	IRC; 2	MCH; 1	DAY; 1	DAR; 22	RCH; 10	BRI; 4	LVS; 5	TAL; 15	ROV; 9	TEX; 6	KAN; 37	MAR; 11	PHO; 4	7th	2350	
2022	Team Penske	12	Ford	DAY; 4	CAL; 18	LVS; 36	**PHO**; 4*	ATL; 17	**COA**; 6	**RCH**; 7*	MAR; 4	BRD; 5	TAL; 11	DOV; 26	DAR; 17	KAN; 12	CLT; 29	GTW; 4	SON; 6	NSH; 3	ROA; 11	ATL; 5	NHA; 18	POC; 33	IRC; 26	MCH; 5	RCH; 10	GLN; 24	DAY; 15	DAR; 13	KAN; 9	BRI; 30	TEX; 4	TAL; 2	ROV; 26	LVS; 28	HOM; 17	MAR; 3	PHO; 2	8th	2354	
2023	Team Penske	12	Ford	DAY; 8	CAL; 26	LVS; 13	PHO; 2	ATL; 7	COA; 21	RCH; 26	BRD; 23	MAR; 7	TAL; 2*	DOV; 3	KAN; 16	DAR; 9	CLT; 1*	GTW; 6	SON; 31	NSH; 36	CSC; 33	ATL; 9	NHA; 22	POC; 30	RCH; 14	MCH; 9	IRC; 13	GLN; 9	DAY; 36	DAR; 9	KAN; 12	BRI; 22	TEX; 28	TAL; 1	ROV; 12	LVS; 6	HOM; 2	MAR; 1	PHO; 2	1st	5035	
2024	Team Penske	12	Ford	DAY; 30	ATL; 2	LVS; 3	PHO; 5	**BRI**; 16	COA; 12	RCH; 19	MAR; 5	TEX; 33	TAL; 20	DOV; 7	KAN; 12	DAR; 36	CLT; 39	GTW; 24	SON; 7	IOW; 1*	NHA; 25	NSH; 6	CSC; 10	POC; 1*	IND; 3	RCH; 11	MCH; 18	DAY; 29	DAR; 37	ATL; 3	GLN; 38	BRI; 6	KAN; 4	TAL; 39	ROV; 10	LVS; 32	HOM; 2	MAR; 1	PHO; 2	2nd	5035	
2025	Team Penske	12	Ford	DAY; 7	**ATL**; 4	COA; 19	PHO; 28	LVS; 35	HOM; 36*	MAR; 11	DAR; 5	BRI; 5	TAL; 37	TEX; 3	KAN; 3	CLT; 38	NSH; 1*	MCH; 32	MXC; 14	POC; 3	ATL; 40	CSC; 12	SON; 36	DOV; 8	IND; 7	IOW; 4	**GLN**; 6	RCH; 3	DAY; 1*	DAR; 18	GTW; 4	BRI; 4	NHA; 1	KAN; 24	ROV; 13	LVS; 38	TAL; 23	MAR; 2	PHO; 1	6th	2373	
2026	Team Penske	12	Ford	DAY; 27	ATL; 10	COA; 8	PHO; 1	LVS; 16	DAR; 3	MAR; 6	**BRI**; 2	KAN; 24	TAL; 37	TEX; 10	GLN; 11	CLT; 7	NSH; 8	MCH; 8	POC; 10	COR; 9*	SON; 6	CHI; 7	**ATL**; 1*	NWS; 11	IND; 26	**IOW**; 3*	**RCH**; 13	NHA; 1*	DAY; 33	DAR; 4	GTW; 35	BRI; 33*	KAN; 5	LVS; 5	CLT; 3	**PHO**; 2	TAL; 37	MAR; 35	HOM; 1	4th	2407	
^{†} – Qualified for Trevor Bayne

===== Daytona 500 =====
Year	Team	Manufacturer	Start	Finish
2015	Wood Brothers Racing	Ford	12	39
2016	Wood Brothers Racing	Ford	7	19
2017	Wood Brothers Racing	Ford	36	2
2018	Team Penske	Ford	3	7*
2019	Team Penske	Ford	14	31
2020	Team Penske	Ford	27	2
2021	Team Penske	Ford	14	30
2022	Team Penske	Ford	7	4
2023	Team Penske	Ford	7	8
2024	Team Penske	Ford	32	30
2025	Team Penske	Ford	16	7
2026	Team Penske	Ford	5	27

==== Xfinity Series ====
NASCAR Xfinity Series results
Year	Team	No.	Make	1	2	3	4	5	6	7	8	9	10	11	12	13	14	15	16	17	18	19	20	21	22	23	24	25	26	27	28	29	30	31	32	33	NXSC	Pts	Ref
2012	Tommy Baldwin Racing	36	Chevy	DAY	PHO	LVS	BRI	CAL	TEX	RCH; 7	TAL	DAR; 43	IOW	CLT	DOV	MCH	ROA	KEN; 15	DAY	NHA	CHI	IND; 27				BRI; 7	ATL					CLT; 14					112th	0^{1}	
2012	Penske Racing	22	Dodge																				IOW; 10	GLN	CGV			RCH; 9	CHI	KEN; 9	DOV; 13		KAN; 11	TEX; 2	PHO	HOM; 8	112th	0^{1}	
2013	Penske Racing	22	Ford	DAY	PHO	LVS	BRI	CAL	TEX	RCH	TAL	DAR	CLT	DOV	IOW; 9	MCH	ROA	KEN	DAY	NHA	CHI	IND	IOW	GLN	MOH	BRI	ATL	RCH	CHI	KEN; 1*	DOV	KAN	CLT	TEX			95th	0^{1}	
2013	Penske Racing	48	Ford																																PHO; 10	HOM	95th	0^{1}	
2014	Team Penske	22	Ford	DAY	PHO	LVS	BRI; 4	CAL	TEX; 8	DAR	RCH; 9	TAL; 21	**IOW**; 2	CLT	DOV	MCH	ROA				CHI; 9	IND	IOW	GLN	MOH	BRI; 1	ATL	RCH; 4	CHI; 4	KEN	DOV	KAN; 3					81st	0^{1}	
2014	Team Penske	12	Ford															KEN; 5	DAY	NHA													CLT; 4	TEX; 3	PHO	HOM; 4	81st	0^{1}	
2015	Team Penske	22	Ford	DAY	ATL	LVS; 2	PHO	CAL	TEX	BRI	RCH	TAL	IOW; 5	CLT; 10	DOV; 34	MCH	CHI; 2	DAY	KEN	NHA	IND; 2	IOW; 1*	GLN	MOH	BRI; 22	ROA; 2	DAR	RCH	CHI; 35	KEN; 1*	DOV; 4	CLT	KAN	TEX	PHO	HOM; 5	22nd	461	
2016	Team Penske	22	Ford	DAY	ATL	LVS	PHO	CAL; 20	TEX	BRI	RCH	TAL	DOV											MOH; 3	BRI	ROA	DAR; 7	RCH	CHI	KEN; 3	DOV; 4	CLT	KAN	TEX	PHO	HOM; 4	97th	0^{1}	
2016	Team Penske	12	Ford											CLT; 16	POC	MCH	IOW	DAY	KEN; 8	NHA	IND	IOW	GLN														97th	0^{1}	
2017	Team Penske	22	Ford	DAY	ATL	LVS	PHO; 2	CAL	TEX; 2	BRI; 2	RCH; 5	TAL		DOV; 2	POC	MCH	IOW	DAY											CHI; 26	KEN	DOV; 1*	CLT; 3	KAN; 3	TEX; 2	PHO; 2*	HOM	89th	0^{1}	
2017	Team Penske	12	Ford										CLT; 1*						KEN; 2	NHA	IND	IOW	GLN	MOH	BRI	ROA	DAR	RCH									89th	0^{1}	
2018	Team Penske	22	Ford	DAY	ATL	LVS; 4	PHO	CAL	**TEX**; 1*	BRI	RCH	TAL	DOV	CLT	POC	MCH	IOW	CHI	DAY; 4	KEN	NHA	IOW	GLN	MOH	BRI	ROA	DAR	IND; 3	LVS	RCH	ROV	DOV	KAN	TEX	PHO	HOM	87th	0^{1}	
2019	Team Penske	12	Ford	DAY	ATL	LVS	PHO	CAL	TEX	BRI	RCH	TAL	DOV	CLT	POC	MCH	IOW	CHI	DAY	KEN	NHA	IOW	GLN; 4	MOH	BRI	ROA	**DAR**; 3	IND	LVS	RCH	ROV	DOV	KAN	TEX	PHO	HOM	83rd	0^{1}	

==== Camping World Truck Series ====
NASCAR Camping World Truck Series results
Year	Team	No.	Make	1	2	3	4	5	6	7	8	9	10	11	12	13	14	15	16	17	18	19	20	21	22	23	NCWTC	Pts	Ref
2012	Brad Keselowski Racing	19	Ram	DAY	MAR	CAR	KAN	CLT	DOV	TEX	KEN	IOW	CHI	POC	MCH	BRI; 6											26th	258^{†}	
2012	Brad Keselowski Racing	29	Ram														ATL; 11	IOW; 1	KEN; 11	LVS	TAL; 6	MAR; 8	TEX; 30	PHO; 5	HOM; 28		26th	258^{†}	
2013	Brad Keselowski Racing	29	Ford	DAY; 8	MAR; 16	CAR; 8	KAN; 3	CLT; 25	DOV; 3	TEX; 8	**KEN**; 5	IOW; 26	ELD; 15	POC; 1*	MCH; 32	BRI; 3	MSP; 16	IOW; 10	CHI; 3	LVS; 20	TAL; 21	MAR; 5	TEX; 15	PHO; 7	**HOM**; 2*		6th	726	
2014	Brad Keselowski Racing	29	Ford	DAY; 6	MAR; 4	KAN; 22	CLT; 22	DOV; 2	TEX; 4	GTW; 7	KEN; 3	IOW; 2	ELD; 3	POC; 5	**MCH**; 21	BRI; 13	MSP; 1*	CHI; 12	NHA; 10	**LVS**; 6	TAL; 5	MAR; 5	TEX; 9	PHO; 4	HOM; 5		2nd	812	
2015	Brad Keselowski Racing	29	Ford	DAY	ATL	MAR	KAN	CLT	**DOV**; 7	TEX	GTW	IOW	KEN; 3	ELD	POC	MCH; 2	BRI; 1	MSP	CHI	NHA	LVS	TAL	MAR	TEX; 3	PHO	HOM	81st	0^{1}	

^{*} Season still in progress
^{1} Ineligible for series points
^{†} In 2012, Blaney switched from Nationwide to Truck Series points at Atlanta Motor Speedway in August.

=== ARCA Racing Series ===
(key) (Bold – Pole position awarded by qualifying time. Italics – Pole position earned by points standings or practice time. * – Most laps led.)

ARCA Racing Series results
Year	Team	No.	Make	1	2	3	4	5	6	7	8	9	10	11	12	13	14	15	16	17	18	19	20	21	ARSC	Pts	Ref
2011	Venturini Motorsports	25	Chevy	DAY	TAL	SLM	TOL	NJE	CHI	POC	MCH	**WIN**; 6*	BLN	IOW											50th	460	
2011	Venturini Motorsports	15	Chevy												IRP; 2	POC	ISF	MAD	DSF	SLM	KAN	TOL			50th	460	
2013	Cunningham Motorsports	22	Dodge	DAY	MOB	SLM	TAL	TOL	ELK	POC	**MCH**; 2*	ROA; 5	WIN	**CHI**; 3*	NJE	POC	BLN	ISF	MAD	DSF	IOW	SLM	KEN	KAN	39th	690	

==== K&N Pro Series East ====
NASCAR K&N Pro Series East results
Year	Car owner	No.	Make	1	2	3	4	5	6	7	8	9	10	11	12	13	14	NKNPSEC	Pts	Ref
2011	Dave Blaney	10	Toyota	GRE	SBO	RCH; 8	IOW; 10	BGS	JFC	LGY	NHA	COL	GRE	NHA	DOV			38th	276	
2012	Dave Blaney	10	Toyota	BRI; 2	GRE	RCH; 22	IOW; 2	BGS	JFC	LGY	CNB	COL	IOW; 24	NHA	DOV; 25	GRE	CAR	23rd	146	

==== K&N Pro Series West ====
NASCAR K&N Pro Series West results
Year	Car owner	No.	Make	1	2	3	4	5	6	7	8	9	10	11	12	13	14	NKNPSWC	Pts	Ref
2011	Dave Blaney	11	Toyota	PHO	AAS	MMP	IOW	LVS	SON	IRW	EVG	PIR	CNS	MRP	SPO	AAS	PHO; 1*	63rd	185	
2017	Troy Cline	88	Ford	TUS	KCR	IRW	IRW	SPO	OSS	CNS	SON; 26	IOW	EVG	DCS	MER	AAS	KCR	61st	18	

==== Whelen Modified Tour ====
NASCAR Whelen Modified Tour results
Year	Car owner	No.	Make	1	2	3	4	5	6	7	8	9	10	11	12	13	14	NWMTC	Pts	Ref
2012	Allan Heinke	98	Chevy	TMP	STA	MND	STA	WFD	NHA; 33	STA	TMP	BRI	TMP	RIV	NHA	STA	TMP	52nd	11	

=== Superstar Racing Experience ===
(key) * – Most laps led. ^{1} – Heat 1 winner. ^{2} – Heat 2 winner.

Superstar Racing Experience results
Year	No.	1	2	3	4	5	6	SRXC	Pts	Ref
2022	12	FIF	SBO	STA	NSV	I55	SHA; 7	18th	14	

Achievements
Preceded by Joey Logano	NASCAR Cup Series Champion; 2023	Succeeded by Joey Logano
Preceded by Denny Hamlin	Coca-Cola 600 Winner; 2023	Succeeded by Christopher Bell
Preceded by Kyle Larson	NASCAR All-Star Race Winner; 2022	Succeeded by Kyle Larson
Preceded by Ty Dillon	NASCAR Camping World Truck Series Rookie of the Year; 2013	Succeeded by Ben Kennedy
