= 2022 NASCAR All-Star Race =

38th iteration of the NASCAR All-Star Race

Race details
- Date: May 22, 2022
- Location: Texas Motor Speedway in Fort Worth, Texas
- Course: Permanent racing facility 1.5 mi (2.4 km)
- Distance: Open: 50 laps, 75 mi (121 km); Stage 1: 20 laps Stage 2: 20 laps Stage 3: 10 laps All-Star Race: 125 Laps, 187.5 mi (301.8 km); Stage 1: 25 laps Stage 2: 25 laps Stage 3: 25 laps Stage 4: 50 laps
- Avg Speed: Open: 82.518 mph (132.800 km/h); All-Star Race: 102.62 mph (165.15 km/h)

NASCAR All Star Open
- Pole: Tyler Reddick (Richard Childress Racing)
- Time: 28.880
- Winner (segment 1): Ricky Stenhouse Jr. (JTG Daugherty Racing)
- Winner (segment 2): Chris Buescher (RFK Racing)
- Winner (segment 3): Daniel Suárez (Trackhouse Racing Team)
- Fan Vote winner: Erik Jones (Petty GMS Motorsports)

NASCAR All-Star Race
- Pole: Kyle Busch (Joe Gibbs Racing)
- Most laps led: Ryan Blaney (Team Penske)
- Laps: 84
- Winner: Ryan Blaney (Team Penske)

Television
- Network: FS1
- Announcers: Mike Joy, Clint Bowyer, Larry McReynolds, and Frankie Muniz (Open)

Radio
- Network: Motor Racing Network
- Announcers: Alex Hayden and Jeff Striegle (Booth); Dave Moody (1 & 2); Mike Bagley (3 & 4) (Turns)

The 2022 NASCAR All-Star Race (XXXVIII) was a NASCAR Cup Series stock car exhibition race that was held on May 22, 2022, at Texas Motor Speedway in Fort Worth, Texas. Contested over 140 laps, extended from 125 laps due to overtime finishes in two stages, it was the second exhibition race of the 2022 NASCAR Cup Series season.

== Report ==
=== Background ===
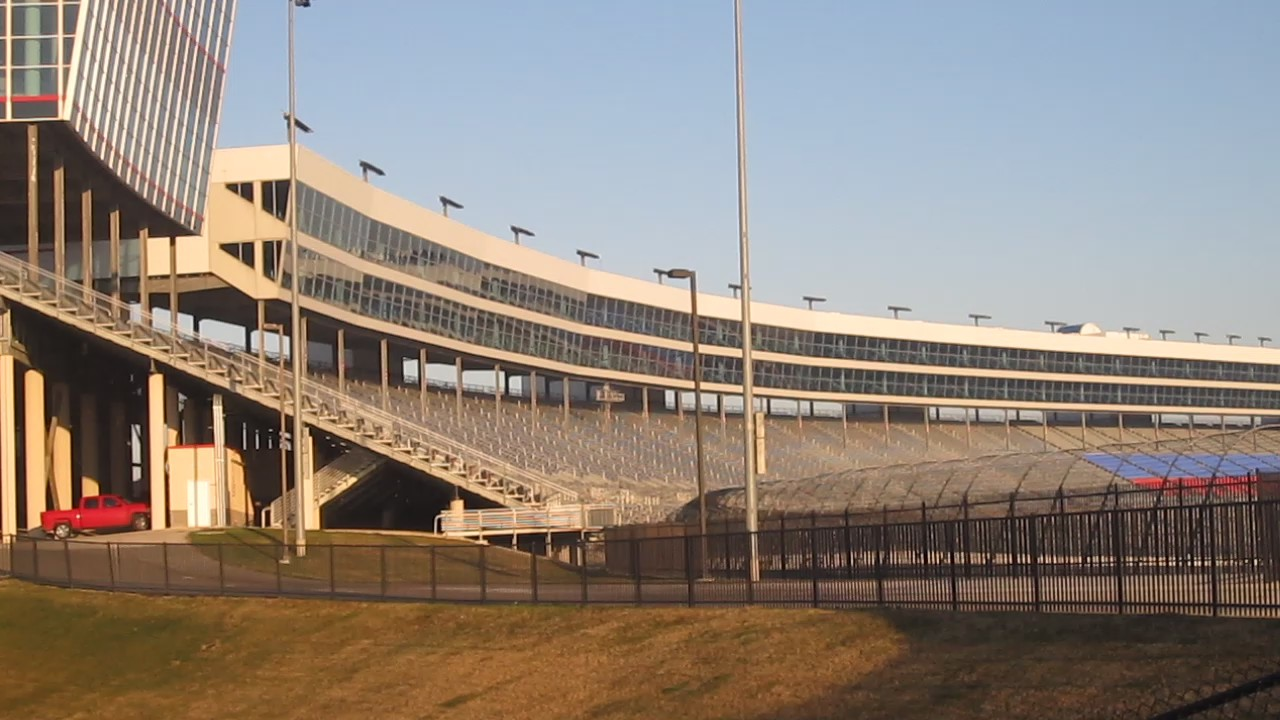
Texas Motor Speedway

The All-Star Race is open to race winners from last season through the 2022 AdventHealth 400 at Kansas Speedway, all previous All-Star race winners, NASCAR Cup champions who had attempted to qualify for every race in 2022, the winner of each stage of the All-Star Open, and the winner of the All-Star fan vote are eligible to compete in the All-Star Race.

==== Entry list ====
- (R) denotes rookie driver.
- (i) denotes driver who is ineligible for series driver points.

===== NASCAR All Star Open =====
No.	Driver	Team	Manufacturer
3	Austin Dillon	Richard Childress Racing	Chevrolet
7	Corey LaJoie	Spire Motorsports	Chevrolet
8	Tyler Reddick	Richard Childress Racing	Chevrolet
15	Garrett Smithley	Rick Ware Racing	Ford
17	Chris Buescher	RFK Racing	Ford
21	Harrison Burton (R)	Wood Brothers Racing	Ford
31	Justin Haley	Kaulig Racing	Chevrolet
38	Todd Gilliland (R)	Front Row Motorsports	Ford
41	Cole Custer	Stewart-Haas Racing	Ford
42	Ty Dillon	Petty GMS Motorsports	Chevrolet
43	Erik Jones	Petty GMS Motorsports	Chevrolet
47	Ricky Stenhouse Jr.	JTG Daugherty Racing	Chevrolet
51	Cody Ware	Rick Ware Racing	Ford
77	Landon Cassill (i)	Spire Motorsports	Chevrolet
78	B. J. McLeod	Live Fast Motorsports	Ford
99	Daniel Suárez	Trackhouse Racing Team	Chevrolet
Official entry list

===== NASCAR All-Star Race =====
No.	Driver	Team	Manufacturer
1	Ross Chastain	Trackhouse Racing Team	Chevrolet
2	Austin Cindric (R)	Team Penske	Ford
4	Kevin Harvick	Stewart-Haas Racing	Ford
5	Kyle Larson	Hendrick Motorsports	Chevrolet
6	Brad Keselowski	RFK Racing	Ford
9	Chase Elliott	Hendrick Motorsports	Chevrolet
10	Aric Almirola	Stewart-Haas Racing	Ford
11	Denny Hamlin	Joe Gibbs Racing	Toyota
12	Ryan Blaney	Team Penske	Ford
14	Chase Briscoe	Stewart-Haas Racing	Ford
16	A. J. Allmendinger (i)	Kaulig Racing	Chevrolet
18	Kyle Busch	Joe Gibbs Racing	Toyota
19	Martin Truex Jr.	Joe Gibbs Racing	Toyota
20	Christopher Bell	Joe Gibbs Racing	Toyota
22	Joey Logano	Team Penske	Ford
23	Bubba Wallace	23XI Racing	Toyota
24	William Byron	Hendrick Motorsports	Chevrolet
34	Michael McDowell	Front Row Motorsports	Ford
45	Kurt Busch	23XI Racing	Toyota
48	Alex Bowman	Hendrick Motorsports	Chevrolet
Official entry list

== Practice ==
=== Open Practice results ===
Tyler Reddick was the fastest in the practice session with a time of 29.059 seconds and a speed of 185.829 mph (299.063 km/h).

Pos	No.	Driver	Team	Manufacturer	Time	Speed
1	8	Tyler Reddick	Richard Childress Racing	Chevrolet	29.059	185.829
2	43	Erik Jones	Petty GMS Motorsports	Chevrolet	29.073	185.739
3	99	Daniel Suárez	Trackhouse Racing Team	Chevrolet	29.129	185.382
Official Open practice results

=== All-Star Race Practice results ===
Denny Hamlin was the fastest in the practice session with a time of 28.838 seconds and a speed of 187.253 mph (301.354 km/h).

Pos	No.	Driver	Team	Manufacturer	Time	Speed
1	11	Denny Hamlin	Joe Gibbs Racing	Toyota	28.838	187.253
2	5	Kyle Larson	Hendrick Motorsports	Chevrolet	28.904	186.825
3	18	Kyle Busch	Joe Gibbs Racing	Toyota	28.909	186.793
Official All-Star practice results

== Qualifying (Open) ==
Tyler Reddick scored the pole for the race with a time of 28.880 seconds and a speed of 186.981 mph (300.917 km/h).

=== Open qualifying results ===
Pos	No.	Driver	Team	Manufacturer	Time
1	8	Tyler Reddick	Richard Childress Racing	Chevrolet	28.880
2	99	Daniel Suárez	Trackhouse Racing Team	Chevrolet	28.892
3	47	Ricky Stenhouse Jr.	JTG Daugherty Racing	Chevrolet	28.956
4	43	Erik Jones	Petty GMS Motorsports	Chevrolet	28.982
5	17	Chris Buescher	RFK Racing	Ford	29.003
6	31	Justin Haley	Kaulig Racing	Chevrolet	29.028
7	3	Austin Dillon	Richard Childress Racing	Chevrolet	29.110
8	7	Corey LaJoie	Spire Motorsports	Chevrolet	29.028
9	21	Harrison Burton (R)	Wood Brothers Racing	Ford	29.224
10	41	Cole Custer	Stewart-Haas Racing	Ford	29.226
11	77	Landon Cassill (i)	Spire Motorsports	Chevrolet	29.287
12	42	Ty Dillon	Petty GMS Motorsports	Chevrolet	29.396
13	51	Cody Ware	Rick Ware Racing	Ford	29.506
14	38	Todd Gilliland (R)	Front Row Motorsports	Ford	29.749
15	15	Garrett Smithley	Rick Ware Racing	Ford	29.895
16	78	B. J. McLeod	Live Fast Motorsports	Ford	29.927
Official NASCAR All Star Open qualifying results

== Qualifying (All-Star Race) ==
Kyle Busch scored the pole for the race by beating Ryan Blaney in the final round of the Pit Crew Challenge.

=== All-Star Race qualifying results ===
Pos	No.	Driver	Team	Manufacturer	R1	R2
1	18	Kyle Busch	Joe Gibbs Racing	Toyota	28.554	1st
2	12	Ryan Blaney	Team Penske	Ford	28.565	2nd
3	24	William Byron	Hendrick Motorsports	Chevrolet	28.528	2nd Round
4	5	Kyle Larson	Hendrick Motorsports	Chevrolet	28.632	2nd Round
5	45	Kurt Busch	23XI Racing	Toyota	28.620	1st Round
6	1	Ross Chastain	Trackhouse Racing Team	Chevrolet	28.723	1st Round
7	19	Martin Truex Jr.	Joe Gibbs Racing	Toyota	28.744	1st Round
8	10	Aric Almirola	Stewart-Haas Racing	Ford	28.767	1st Round
9	22	Joey Logano	Team Penske	Ford	28.777	—
10	16	A. J. Allmendinger (i)	Kaulig Racing	Chevrolet	28.807	—
11	14	Chase Briscoe	Stewart-Haas Racing	Ford	28.822	—
12	2	Austin Cindric (R)	Team Penske	Ford	28.830	—
13	9	Chase Elliott	Hendrick Motorsports	Chevrolet	28.831	—
14	20	Christopher Bell	Joe Gibbs Racing	Toyota	28.834	—
15	4	Kevin Harvick	Stewart-Haas Racing	Ford	28.864	—
16	11	Denny Hamlin	Joe Gibbs Racing	Toyota	28.891	—
17	23	Bubba Wallace	23XI Racing	Toyota	28.904	—
18	6	Brad Keselowski	RFK Racing	Ford	28.908	—
19	34	Michael McDowell	Front Row Motorsports	Ford	28.935	—
20	48	Alex Bowman	Hendrick Motorsports	Chevrolet	29.011	—
21	47	Ricky Stenhouse Jr.	JTG Daugherty Racing	Chevrolet	Open Stage 1 Winner	—
22	17	Chris Buescher	RFK Racing	Ford	Open Stage 2 Winner	—
23	99	Daniel Suárez	Trackhouse Racing Team	Chevrolet	Open Stage 3 Winner	—
24	43	Erik Jones	Petty GMS Motorsports	Chevrolet	Fan Vote Winner	—
Official NASCAR All Star Race starting lineup

== NASCAR All Star Open ==
=== NASCAR All Star Open results ===
Pos	Grid	No.	Driver	Team	Manufacturer	Laps
1	2	99	Daniel Suárez	Trackhouse Racing Team	Chevrolet	50
2	7	3	Austin Dillon	Richard Childress Racing	Chevrolet	50
3	6	31	Justin Haley	Kaulig Racing	Chevrolet	50
4	8	7	Corey LaJoie	Spire Motorsports	Chevrolet	50
5	4	43	Erik Jones	Petty GMS Motorsports	Chevrolet	50
6	12	42	Ty Dillon	Petty GMS Motorsports	Chevrolet	50
7	10	41	Cole Custer	Stewart-Haas Racing	Ford	50
8	14	38	Todd Gilliland (R)	Front Row Motorsports	Ford	50
9	13	51	Cody Ware	Rick Ware Racing	Ford	50
10	15	15	Garrett Smithley	Rick Ware Racing	Ford	50
11	16	78	B. J. McLeod	Live Fast Motorsports	Ford	50
12	1	8	Tyler Reddick	Richard Childress Racing	Chevrolet	42
13	9	21	Harrison Burton (R)	Wood Brothers Racing	Ford	42
14	5	17	Chris Buescher	RFK Racing	Ford	40 ^{a}
15	11	77	Landon Cassill (i)	Spire Motorsports	Chevrolet	25
16	3	47	Ricky Stenhouse Jr.	JTG Daugherty Racing	Chevrolet	20 ^{b}
^a Winner of the second segment.^b Winner of the first segment.
Official NASCAR All Star Open race results

== NASCAR All-Star Race ==
=== NASCAR All-Star Race results ===
Pos	Grid	No.	Driver	Team	Manufacturer	Laps
1	2	12	Ryan Blaney	Team Penske	Ford	140
2	16	11	Denny Hamlin	Joe Gibbs Racing	Toyota	140
3	12	2	Austin Cindric (R)	Team Penske	Ford	140
4	9	22	Joey Logano	Team Penske	Ford	140
5	23	99	Daniel Suárez	Trackhouse Racing Team	Chevrolet	140
6	20	48	Alex Bowman	Hendrick Motorsports	Chevrolet	140
7	10	16	A. J. Allmendinger (i)	Kaulig Racing	Chevrolet	140
8	22	17	Chris Buescher	RFK Racing	Ford	140
9	18	6	Brad Keselowski	RFK Racing	Ford	140
10	14	20	Christopher Bell	Joe Gibbs Racing	Toyota	140
11	3	24	William Byron	Hendrick Motorsports	Chevrolet	140
12	8	10	Aric Almirola	Stewart-Haas Racing	Ford	140
13	5	45	Kurt Busch	23XI Racing	Toyota	140
14	7	19	Martin Truex Jr.	Joe Gibbs Racing	Toyota	140
15	19	34	Michael McDowell	Front Row Motorsports	Ford	140
16	17	23	Bubba Wallace	23XI Racing	Toyota	140
17	15	4	Kevin Harvick	Stewart-Haas Racing	Ford	140
18	11	14	Chase Briscoe	Stewart-Haas Racing	Ford	140
19	21	47	Ricky Stenhouse Jr.	JTG Daugherty Racing	Chevrolet	139
20	24	43	Erik Jones	Petty GMS Motorsports	Chevrolet	103
21	1	18	Kyle Busch	Joe Gibbs Racing	Toyota	47
22	6	1	Ross Chastain	Trackhouse Racing Team	Chevrolet	47
23	13	9	Chase Elliott	Hendrick Motorsports	Chevrolet	47
24	4	5	Kyle Larson	Hendrick Motorsports	Chevrolet	36
Official NASCAR All-Star Race results

=== Overtime controversy ===
At the race's original final lap, Ricky Stenhouse Jr. hit the wall coming out of turn two. NASCAR brought out a caution moments before race leader Ryan Blaney passed the finish line. This meant the race would go into overtime, as the NASCAR All-Star Race rules for that year required the race end under green. Blaney was unaware of the caution and lowered his window net shortly after crossing the finish line. Driving without a secured window net is considered a safety violation and would typically result in a black flag. Blaney attempted to secure the window net by himself, but was unable to do so properly. NASCAR did not allow Blaney to come to pit road in order for his team to securely install the window net. Instead, Blaney retained his lead for the overtime restart and drove with a half-secured net. He would claim afterwards that his window net was secured during the overtime laps. Denny Hamlin, as well as fans, later criticized NASCAR for the timing of the caution and allowing Blaney to drive and keep his first spot with a blatant safety violation. NASCAR Senior Vice President of Competition Scott Miller admitted the caution was called prematurely and they had "no way for [them] to know" if Blaney managed to securely install the window net after he originally lowered it.

In response to the controversy, NASCAR pledged to increase the amount of communication between the race control, Race Director and Senior Vice President of Competition in calling cautions to prevent inconsistent calls from reoccurring.

== Media ==
=== Television ===
Fox Sports was the television broadcaster of the race in the United States. Lap-by-lap announcer, Mike Joy, Clint Bowyer, and Larry McReynolds called the race from the broadcast booth. Actor Frankie Muniz joined Joy, Bowyer, and McReynolds in the booth for the Open. Jamie Little and Vince Welch handled pit road for the television side.

FS1
Booth announcers	Pit reporters
Lap-by-lap: Mike Joy; Color-commentator: Clint Bowyer; Color-commentator: Larry McReynolds; Guest commentator: Frankie Muniz (Open)	Jamie Little; Vince Welch

=== Radio ===
Motor Racing Network (MRN) continued their longstanding relationship with Speedway Motorsports to broadcast the race on radio. The lead announcers for the race's broadcast were Alex Hayden and Jeff Striegle. The network also had two announcers on each side of the track: Dave Moody in turns 1 and 2 and Mike Bagley in turns 3 and 4. Steve Post and Kim Coon were the network's pit lane reporters. The network's broadcast was simulcasted on Sirius XM NASCAR Radio.

MRN Radio
Booth announcers	Turn announcers	Pit reporters
Lead announcer: Alex Hayden; Announcer: Jeff Striegle	Turns 1 & 2: Dave Moody; Turns 3 & 4: Mike Bagley	Steve Post; Kim Coon
