= Paul Williamson (racing driver) =

American racing driver

- Born: October 23, 1996 (age 30); Kenansville, North Carolina, U.S.

ARCA Menards Series career
- 1 race run over 1 year
- Best finish: 83rd (2019)
- First race: 2019 Lucas Oil 200 (Daytona)
Wins	Top tens	Poles
0	0	0
- Statistics up to date as of February 4, 2025.

Paul Williamson (born October 23, 1996) is an American professional stock car racing driver who has competed in the ARCA Menards Series and the CARS Late Model Stock Tour.

Williamson has also previously competed in series such as the Southern National Late Model Series, Southeast Limited Late Model Series, the Paramount Kia Big 10 Challenge, and the NASCAR Advance Auto Parts Weekly Series, and is a former track champion at New River All-American Speedway.

== Motorsports results ==
=== ARCA Menards Series ===
(key) (Bold – Pole position awarded by qualifying time. Italics – Pole position earned by points standings or practice time. * – Most laps led.)

ARCA Menards Series results
Year	Team	No.	Make	1	2	3	4	5	6	7	8	9	10	11	12	13	14	15	16	17	18	19	20	AMSC	Pts	Ref
2019	Vizion Motorsports	36	Toyota	DAY; 30	FIF	SLM	TAL	NSH	TOL	CLT	POC	MCH	MAD	GTW	CHI	ELK	IOW	POC	ISF	DSF	SLM	IRP	KAN	83rd	80	

=== CARS Late Model Stock Car Tour ===
(key) (Bold – Pole position awarded by qualifying time. Italics – Pole position earned by points standings or practice time. * – Most laps led. ** – All laps led.)

CARS Late Model Stock Car Tour results
Year	Team	No.	Make	1	2	3	4	5	6	7	8	9	10	11	12	13	14	15	16	17	CLMSCTC	Pts	Ref
2024	Paul Williamson Racing	29W	N/A	SNM	HCY	AAS; 20	OCS	ACE	TCM	LGY	DOM	CRW	HCY	NWS	ACE	WCS	FLC	SBO	TCM	NWS	N/A	0	
