= 2019 Lucas Oil 200 =

2019 Lucas Oil 200 driven by General Tire
Race details
- Race 1 of 20 of the 2019 ARCA Menards Series
- Date: February 9, 2019
- Official name: 56th Annual Lucas Oil 200 driven by General Tire
- Location: Daytona Beach, Florida, Daytona International Speedway
- Course: Permanent racing facility
- Course length: 2.5 miles (4.0 km)
- Distance: 86 laps, 215 mi (346.008 km)
- Scheduled distance: 80 laps, 200 mi (321.868 km)
- Average speed: 126.655 miles per hour (203.831 km/h)

Pole position
Driver	Christian Eckes	Venturini Motorsports
- Time: 49.180

Most laps led
Driver	Harrison Burton	Venturini Motorsports
- Laps: 48

Winner
No. 20	Harrison Burton	Venturini Motorsports

Television in the United States
- Network: Fox Sports 1
- Announcers: David Rieff, Phil Parsons

Radio in the United States
- Radio: Motor Racing Network

The 2019 Lucas Oil 200 driven by General Tire was the first stock car race of the 2019 ARCA Menards Series season and the 56th iteration of the event. The race was held on Saturday, February 9, 2019, in Daytona Beach, Florida at Daytona International Speedway, a 2.5 miles (4.0 km) permanent triangular-shaped superspeedway. The race was extended from its scheduled 80 laps to 86 due to a NASCAR overtime finish. At race's end, Harrison Burton of Venturini Motorsports would survive a one-lap overtime finish to win his third and to date, final career ARCA Menards Series win and his first and only win of the season. To fill out the podium, Todd Gilliland of DGR-Crosley and Grant Quinlan of Rette Jones Racing would finish second and third, respectively.

== Background ==
Daytona International Speedway is one of three superspeedways to hold NASCAR races, the other two being Indianapolis Motor Speedway and Talladega Superspeedway. The standard track at Daytona International Speedway is a four-turn superspeedway that is 2.5 miles (4.0 km) long. The track's turns are banked at 31 degrees, while the front stretch, the location of the finish line, is banked at 18 degrees.

=== Entry list ===
#	Driver	Team	Make	Sponsor
1	Chuck Hiers	Fast Track Racing	Toyota	Glecker & Sons, Ashley Homes
2	Eric Caudell	CCM Racing	Ford	ETRM Software Counseling, Wet Pets Store
02	Andy Seuss	Our Motorsports	Chevrolet	Canto Printing, Robert B. Our Co.
3	Willie Mullins	Mullins Racing	Ford	County Waste, Crow Wing Recycling
4	Todd Gilliland	DGR-Crosley	Toyota	Frontline Enterprises, Inc.
5	Bobby Gerhart	Bobby Gerhart Racing	Chevrolet	Lucas Oil
06	Con Nicolopoulos	Wayne Peterson Racing	Chevrolet	Great Railing
7	Codie Rohrbaugh	CR7 Motorsports	Chevrolet	Grant County Mulch
09	C. J. McLaughlin	Our Motorsports	Chevrolet	SciAps
10	Tommy Vigh Jr.	Fast Track Racing	Ford	Extreme Kleaner
11	Jason White	Fast Track Racing	Chevrolet	Powder Ventures Excavations
15	Christian Eckes	Venturini Motorsports	Toyota	JBL
18	Riley Herbst	Joe Gibbs Racing	Toyota	Monster Energy
20	Harrison Burton	Venturini Motorsports	Toyota	DEX Imaging
22	Connor Hall	Chad Bryant Racing	Ford	Marlow Yachts
23	Bret Holmes	Bret Holmes Racing	Chevrolet	Southern States Bank, Holmes II Excavating
25	Michael Self	Venturini Motorsports	Toyota	Sinclair
27	Travis Braden	RFMS Racing	Ford	MatrixCare
28	Brandon McReynolds	KBR Development	Toyota	US Workboats
29	Derrick Lancaster	On Point Motorsports	Toyota	Total Car & Truck Service, RGM Erectors
30	Grant Quinlan	Rette Jones Racing	Ford	Jones Demolition & Abatement
32	Gus Dean	Win-Tron Racing	Chevrolet	Baker Distributing Company, CAB Installers
35	Brenden Queen	Vizion Motorsports	Toyota	Duragloss
36	Paul Williamson	Vizion Motorsports	Toyota	FV Recycling, Rockford Inn
43	Sean Corr	Empire Racing	Chevrolet	Nesco Bus
44	John Ferrier	Empire Racing	Chevrolet	877-4STEMCELL
46	Thad Moffitt	Empire Racing	Chevrolet	Performance Plus Motor Oil
48	Brad Smith	Brad Smith Motorsports	Chevrolet	Brad Smith Motorsports
52	Tyler Dippel	Ken Schrader Racing	Ford	Federated Auto Parts, D&A Concrete
54	Natalie Decker	DGR-Crosley	Toyota	N29 Technologies, LLC
55	Leilani Munter	Venturini Motorsports	Toyota	What the Health
61	J. J. Pack	J. J. Pack Racing	Toyota	Ice Boxx Customs
63	Dave Mader III	Spraker Racing Enterprises	Ford	American Apparel, Diamond C Ranch
69	Scott Melton	Kimmel Racing	Ford	Melton-McFadden Insurance Agency
77	Joe Graf Jr.	Chad Bryant Racing	Ford	Eat Sleep Race
Official entry list

== Practice ==
=== First practice ===
The first practice was held on Thursday, February 7, at 4:00 pm EST, and would last for two hours. Brandon McReynolds of KBR Development would set the fastest time in the session, with a time of 49.014 and an average speed of 183.621 miles per hour (295.509 km/h).

Pos.	#	Driver	Team	Make	Time	Speed
1	28	Brandon McReynolds	KBR Development	Toyota	49.014	183.621
2	4	Todd Gilliland	DGR-Crosley	Toyota	49.155	183.094
3	32	Gus Dean	Win-Tron Racing	Chevrolet	49.169	183.042
Full first practice results

=== Second and final practice ===
The second and final practice session, sometimes known as Happy Hour, was held on Friday, February 8, at 9:30 am EST, and would last for one hour. Andy Seuss of Our Motorsports would set the fastest time in the session, with a time of 49.437 and an average speed of 182.050 miles per hour (292.981 km/h).

Pos.	#	Driver	Team	Make	Time	Speed
1	02	Andy Seuss	Our Motorsports	Chevrolet	49.437	182.050
2	43	Sean Corr	Empire Racing	Chevrolet	49.522	181.737
3	52	Tyler Dippel	Ken Schrader Racing	Ford	49.723	181.003
Full Happy Hour practice results

== Qualifying ==
Qualifying was held on Friday, February 8, at 3:30 pm EST. Each driver was split into six groups, and each group would run four minute sessions. Christian Eckes of Venturini Motorsports would win the pole, setting a time of 49.180 and an average speed of 183.001 miles per hour (294.512 km/h).

=== Full qualifying results ===
Pos.	#	Driver	Team	Make	Time	Speed
1	15	Christian Eckes	Venturini Motorsports	Toyota	49.180	183.001
2	46	Thad Moffitt	Empire Racing	Chevrolet	49.226	182.830
3	55	Leilani Munter	Venturini Motorsports	Toyota	49.287	182.604
4	3	Willie Mullins	Mullins Racing	Ford	49.290	182.593
5	20	Harrison Burton	Venturini Motorsports	Toyota	49.291	182.589
6	25	Michael Self	Venturini Motorsports	Toyota	49.302	182.548
7	54	Natalie Decker	DGR-Crosley	Toyota	49.412	182.142
8	27	Travis Braden	RFMS Racing	Ford	49.413	182.138
9	02	Andy Seuss	Our Motorsports	Chevrolet	49.436	182.054
10	22	Connor Hall	Chad Bryant Racing	Ford	49.467	181.939
11	28	Brandon McReynolds	KBR Development	Toyota	49.482	181.884
12	52	Tyler Dippel	Ken Schrader Racing	Ford	49.664	181.218
13	09	C. J. McLaughlin	Our Motorsports	Chevrolet	49.683	181.148
14	23	Bret Holmes	Bret Holmes Racing	Chevrolet	49.693	181.112
15	7	Codie Rohrbaugh	CR7 Motorsports	Chevrolet	49.739	180.945
16	32	Gus Dean	Win-Tron Racing	Chevrolet	49.748	180.912
17	18	Riley Herbst	Joe Gibbs Racing	Toyota	49.790	180.759
18	4	Todd Gilliland	DGR-Crosley	Toyota	50.088	179.684
19	35	Brenden Queen	Vizion Motorsports	Toyota	50.140	179.497
20	77	Joe Graf Jr.	Chad Bryant Racing	Ford	50.155	179.444
21	44	John Ferrier	Empire Racing	Chevrolet	50.178	179.361
22	43	Sean Corr	Empire Racing	Chevrolet	50.181	179.351
23	36	Paul Williamson	Vizion Motorsports	Toyota	50.219	179.215
24	5	Bobby Gerhart	Bobby Gerhart Racing	Chevrolet	50.259	179.072
25	30	Grant Quinlan	Rette Jones Racing	Ford	50.369	178.681
26	29	Derrick Lancaster	On Point Motorsports	Toyota	50.372	178.671
27	63	Dave Mader III	Spraker Racing Enterprises	Ford	50.395	178.589
28	69	Scott Melton	Kimmel Racing	Ford	50.627	177.771
29	61	J. J. Pack	J. J. Pack Racing	Toyota	50.830	177.061
30	10	Tommy Vigh Jr.	Fast Track Racing	Ford	51.010	176.436
31	11	Jason White	Fast Track Racing	Chevrolet	51.010	176.436
32	2	Eric Caudell	CCM Racing	Ford	51.341	175.298
33	1	Chuck Hiers	Fast Track Racing	Toyota	51.369	175.203
34	48	Brad Smith	Brad Smith Motorsports	Chevrolet	52.111	172.708
35	06	Con Nicolopoulos	Wayne Peterson Racing	Chevrolet	53.499	168.227
Official qualifying results

== Race results ==
Fin	St	#	Driver	Team	Make	Laps	Led	Status	Pts
1	5	20	Harrison Burton	Venturini Motorsports	Toyota	86	48	running	245
2	18	4	Todd Gilliland	DGR-Crosley	Toyota	86	0	running	220
3	25	30	Grant Quinlan	Rette Jones Racing	Ford	86	0	running	215
4	1	15	Christian Eckes	Venturini Motorsports	Toyota	86	9	running	220
5	22	43	Sean Corr	Empire Racing	Chevrolet	86	0	running	205
6	7	54	Natalie Decker	DGR-Crosley	Toyota	86	0	running	200
7	15	7	Codie Rohrbaugh	CR7 Motorsports	Chevrolet	86	0	running	195
8	8	27	Travis Braden	RFMS Racing	Ford	86	0	running	190
9	9	02	Andy Seuss	Our Motorsports	Chevrolet	86	0	running	185
10	17	18	Riley Herbst	Joe Gibbs Racing	Toyota	86	0	running	180
11	10	22	Connor Hall	Chad Bryant Racing	Ford	86	0	running	175
12	12	52	Tyler Dippel	Ken Schrader Racing	Ford	86	0	running	170
13	24	5	Bobby Gerhart	Bobby Gerhart Racing	Chevrolet	86	0	running	165
14	33	1	Chuck Hiers	Fast Track Racing	Toyota	86	0	running	160
15	3	55	Leilani Munter	Venturini Motorsports	Toyota	86	0	running	155
16	31	11	Jason White	Fast Track Racing	Chevrolet	86	0	running	150
17	26	29	Derrick Lancaster	On Point Motorsports	Toyota	86	0	running	145
18	14	23	Bret Holmes	Bret Holmes Racing	Chevrolet	85	0	accident	140
19	34	48	Brad Smith	Brad Smith Motorsports	Chevrolet	85	0	running	135
20	27	63	Dave Mader III	Spraker Racing Enterprises	Ford	84	0	suspension	130
21	20	77	Joe Graf Jr.	Chad Bryant Racing	Ford	83	0	running	125
22	35	06	Con Nicolopoulos	Wayne Peterson Racing	Chevrolet	83	0	running	120
23	30	10	Tommy Vigh Jr.	Fast Track Racing	Ford	82	0	running	115
24	13	09	C. J. McLaughlin	Our Motorsports	Chevrolet	79	0	running	110
25	11	28	Brandon McReynolds	KBR Development	Toyota	78	0	accident	105
26	16	32	Gus Dean	Win-Tron Racing	Chevrolet	78	29	accident	105
27	2	46	Thad Moffitt	Empire Racing	Chevrolet	70	0	accident	95
28	29	61	J. J. Pack	J. J. Pack Racing	Toyota	50	0	accident	90
29	19	35	Brenden Queen	Vizion Motorsports	Toyota	49	0	accident	85
30	23	36	Paul Williamson	Vizion Motorsports	Toyota	48	0	accident	80
31	6	25	Michael Self	Venturini Motorsports	Toyota	48	0	running	75
32	28	69	Scott Melton	Kimmel Racing	Ford	45	0	brakes	70
33	32	2	Eric Caudell	CCM Racing	Ford	40	0	accident	65
34	21	44	John Ferrier	Empire Racing	Chevrolet	35	0	clutch	60
35	4	3	Willie Mullins	Mullins Racing	Ford	3	0	accident	55
Official race results

== Standings after the race ==
Drivers' Championship standings

Pos	Driver	Points
1	Harrison Burton	245
2	Christian Eckes	220 (-25)
3	Sean Corr	205 (-40)
4	Natalie Decker	200 (-45)
5	Codie Rohrbaugh	195 (-50)
6	Travis Braden	190 (-55)
7	Andy Seuss	185 (-60)
8	Riley Herbst	180 (-65)
9	Connor Hall	175 (-70)
10	Tyler Dippel	170 (-75)

- Note: Only the first 10 positions are included for the driver standings.

Previous race: 2018 ARCA Kansas 150	ARCA Menards Series; 2019 season	Next race: 2019 ARCA Pensacola 200
