= Brandon Lynn =

American racing driver (born 1995)

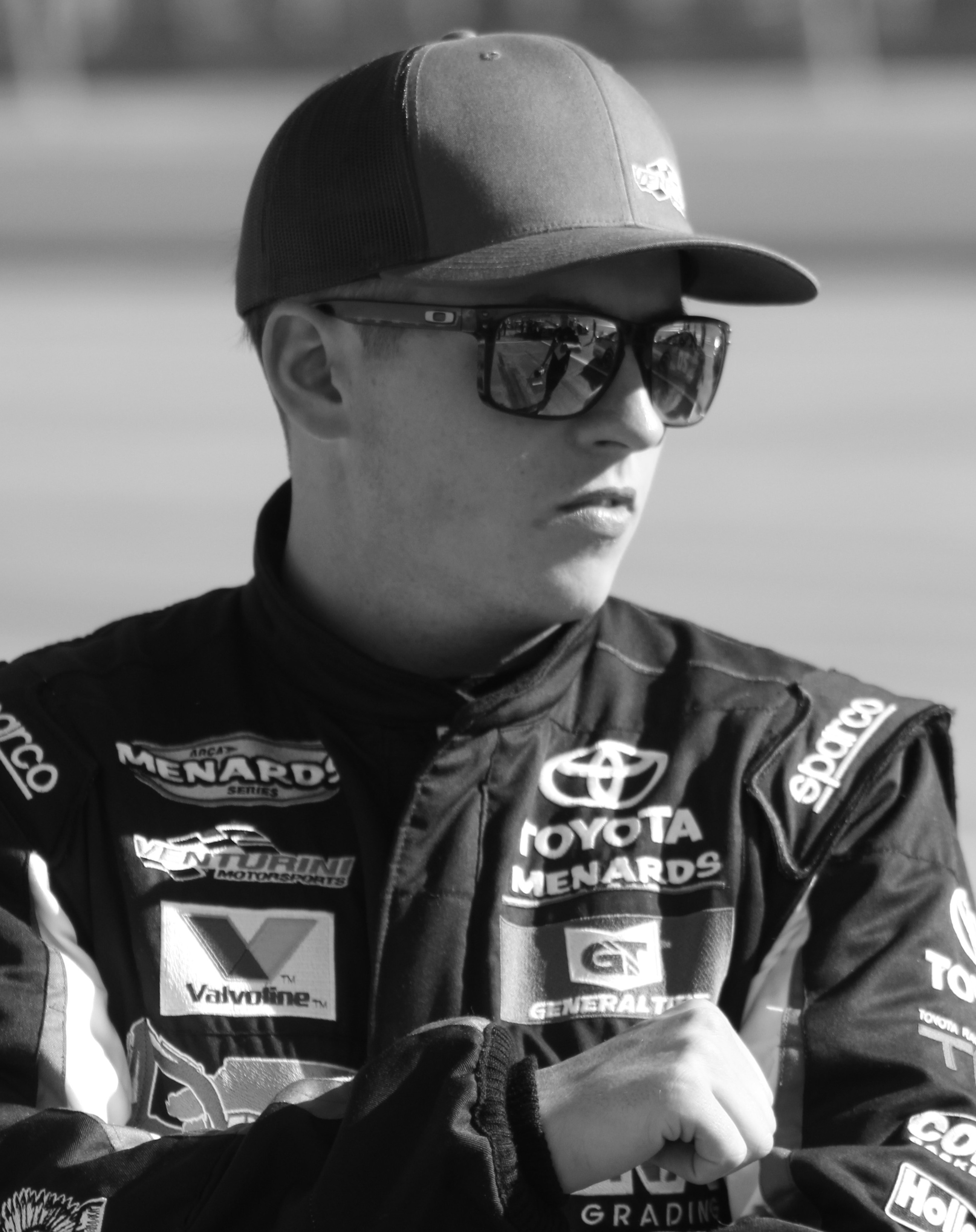
- Lynn in 2019
- Born: December 28, 1995 (age 30); Polkton, North Carolina, U.S.

ARCA Menards Series career
- 12 races run over 6 years
- Best finish: 41st (2016)
- First race: 2015 Federated Car Care Fall Classic 200 (Salem)
- Last race: 2020 General Tire 200 (Talladega)
Wins	Top tens	Poles
0	5	1

ARCA Menards Series East career
- 1 race run over 1 year
- Best finish: 63rd (2017)
- First race: 2017 Zombie Auto 125 (Bristol)
Wins	Top tens	Poles
0	0	0
- Statistics up to date as of January 14, 2025.

Brandon Lynn (born December 28, 1995) is an American former professional stock car racing racing driver. He last competed part-time in the ARCA Menards Series, driving the No. 22 Ford for Chad Bryant Racing.

== Career ==
Lynn made his ARCA Racing Series debut in 2015, driving the No. 36 Ford for Lira Motorsports at Salem, finishing 13th. He would run Lira's No. 58 at Kentucky and Kansas, finishing 13th and 17th respectively.

Lynn was set to fun full-time with Lira Motorsports in 2016 and compete for rookie of the year honors. However, he only ran the first four races, driving the No. 36 at Daytona, Nashville, Salem, and Talladega, scoring a best finish of eighth.

In 2017, Lynn made one start with Mason Mitchell Motorsports, finishing 18th at Talladega. He would also make his K&N Pro Pro Series East debut at Bristol, driving for NextGen Motorsports, where he finished 15th.

In 2018, Lynn would drive the No. 55 Venturini Motorsports Toyota in two races, finishing seventh at Talladega and tenth at Charlotte.

Lynn returned to Venturini Motorsports for Talladega again in 2019. In qualifying, he would score his first career pole. Lynn would finish the race in third.

The following year, Lynn signed a two race deal with Chad Bryant Racing to run the races at Talladega and Watkins Glen. 1992 NASCAR Cup Series championship winning crew chief Paul Andrews would be Lynn's crew chief. Lynn would finish the Talladega race 15th, seven laps down. The Watkins Glen race was later cancelled, and Lynn did not compete in its replacement at the Daytona road course.

== Motorsports results ==
=== NASCAR ===
(key) (Bold - Pole position awarded by qualifying time. Italics - Pole position earned by points standings or practice time. * – Most laps led.)

==== K&N Pro Series East ====
NASCAR K&N Pro Series East results
Year	Team	No.	Make	1	2	3	4	5	6	7	8	9	10	11	12	13	14	NKNPSEC	Pts	Ref
2017	Troy Williams Racing	9	Ford	NSM	GRE	BRI; 15	SBO	SBO	MEM	BLN	TMP	NHA	IOW	GLN	LGY	NJM	DOV	62nd	29	

=== ARCA Menards Series ===
(key) (Bold – Pole position awarded by qualifying time. Italics – Pole position earned by points standings or practice time. * – Most laps led.)

ARCA Menards Series results
Year	Team	No.	Make	1	2	3	4	5	6	7	8	9	10	11	12	13	14	15	16	17	18	19	20	AMSC	Pts	Ref
2015	Lira Motorsports	36	Ford	DAY	MOB	NSH	SLM	TAL	TOL	NJE	POC	MCH	CHI	WIN	IOW	IRP	POC	BLN	ISF	DSF	SLM; 13			49th	475	
2015	Lira Motorsports	58	Ford																			KEN; 13	KAN; 17	49th	475	
2016	Lira Motorsports	36	Ford	DAY; 16	NSH; 6	SLM; 8	TAL; 32	TOL	NJE	POC	MCH	MAD	WIN	IOW	IRP	POC	BLN	ISF	DSF	SLM	CHI	KEN	KAN	41st	610	
2017	Mason Mitchell Motorsports	88	Chevy	DAY	NSH	SLM	TAL; 18	TOL	ELK	POC	MCH	MAD	IOW	IRP	POC	WIN	ISF	ROA	DSF	SLM	CHI	KEN	KAN	99th	145	
2018	Venturini Motorsports	55	Toyota	DAY	NSH	SLM	TAL; 7	TOL	CLT; 10	POC	MCH	MAD	GTW	CHI	IOW	ELK	POC	ISF	BLN	DSF	SLM	IRP	KAN	62nd	350	
2019	Venturini Motorsports	20	Toyota	DAY	FIF	SLM	**TAL**; 3	NSH	TOL	CLT	POC	MCH	MAD	GTW	CHI	ELK	IOW	POC	ISF	DSF	SLM	IRP	KAN	60th	220	
2020	Chad Bryant Racing	22	Ford	DAY	PHO	TAL; 15	POC	IRP	KEN	IOW	KAN	TOL	TOL	MCH	DRC	GTW	I44	TOL	BRI	WIN	MEM	ISF	KAN	73rd	29	

=== CARS Super Late Model Tour ===
(key)

CARS Super Late Model Tour results
Year	Team	No.	Make	1	2	3	4	5	6	7	8	9	10	CSLMTC	Pts	Ref
2015	Dick Woodman	4	Chevy	SNM; 18	ROU; 8	HCY; 18	SNM; 22	TCM	MMS	ROU	CON	MYB	HCY	27th	66	
2018	Dave Pletcher	97	Toyota	MYB	NSH	ROU	HCY	BRI	AND	HCY	ROU	SBO; 3		33rd	30	
2019	Buggy Pletcher	97	Toyota	SNM; 10	HCY	NSH	MMS	BRI	HCY	ROU	SBO			33rd	23	
