= Brad Gross (racing driver) =

American racing driver

- Born: Brad J. Gross; Grapevine, Texas, U.S.

NASCAR FedEx Freight Truck Series career
- 2021 position: 123rd
- Best finish: 123rd (2021)
Wins	Top tens	Poles
0	0	0
- Statistics up to date as of December 31, 2021.

Brad J. Gross is an American professional racing driver who competes in the Sports Car Club of America and previously part-time in the NASCAR Camping World Truck Series, driving the No. 83 Chevrolet Silverado for CMI Motorsports. He has also competed in the Trans-Am Series.

== Racing career ==
Gross has competed in the Sports Car Club of America (SCCA) since 2014 in the Mid-States Conference. He won the GT2 championship in 2015 and was the series' driver of the year for the Texas region in 2019. He drives a No. 13 car that uses the same paint scheme and number font as Dale Earnhardt's famous No. 3 in the NASCAR Cup Series. His wife Dani is his crew chief in the series.

In a Facebook post on April 5, 2021, Gross announced that he would be debuting in NASCAR by competing in the Truck Series' new race at the Circuit of the Americas road course for CMI Motorsports. The CMI team confirmed the news the following day in a Twitter post. He had previously competed in the Trans-Am Series TA2 class race at the track in November 2020, finishing 14th. However, he failed to qualify.

== Personal life ==
Gross is the owner of metalworking newsletter Manufacturing News, which will be one of his sponsors in the Truck Series race at COTA. In 2019, the company sponsored NASCAR Xfinity Series driver Josh Bilicki at Texas Motor Speedway.

Gross lives in Grapevine, Texas with his wife Dani, who is his crew chief in the SCCA.

== Motorsports career results ==
=== NASCAR ===
(key) (Bold – Pole position awarded by qualifying time. Italics – Pole position earned by points standings or practice time. * – Most laps led.)

==== Camping World Truck Series ====
NASCAR Camping World Truck Series results
Year	Team	No.	Make	1	2	3	4	5	6	7	8	9	10	11	12	13	14	15	16	17	18	19	20	21	22	NCWTC	Pts	Ref
2021	CMI Motorsports	83	Chevy	DAY	DAY	LVS	ATL	BRI	RCH	KAN	DAR	COA; DNQ	CLT	TEX	NSH	POC	KNX	GLN	GTW	DAR	BRI	LVS	TAL	MAR	PHO	123rd	-	
