= Josh White (racing driver) =

American stock car driver and Marine (born 1991)

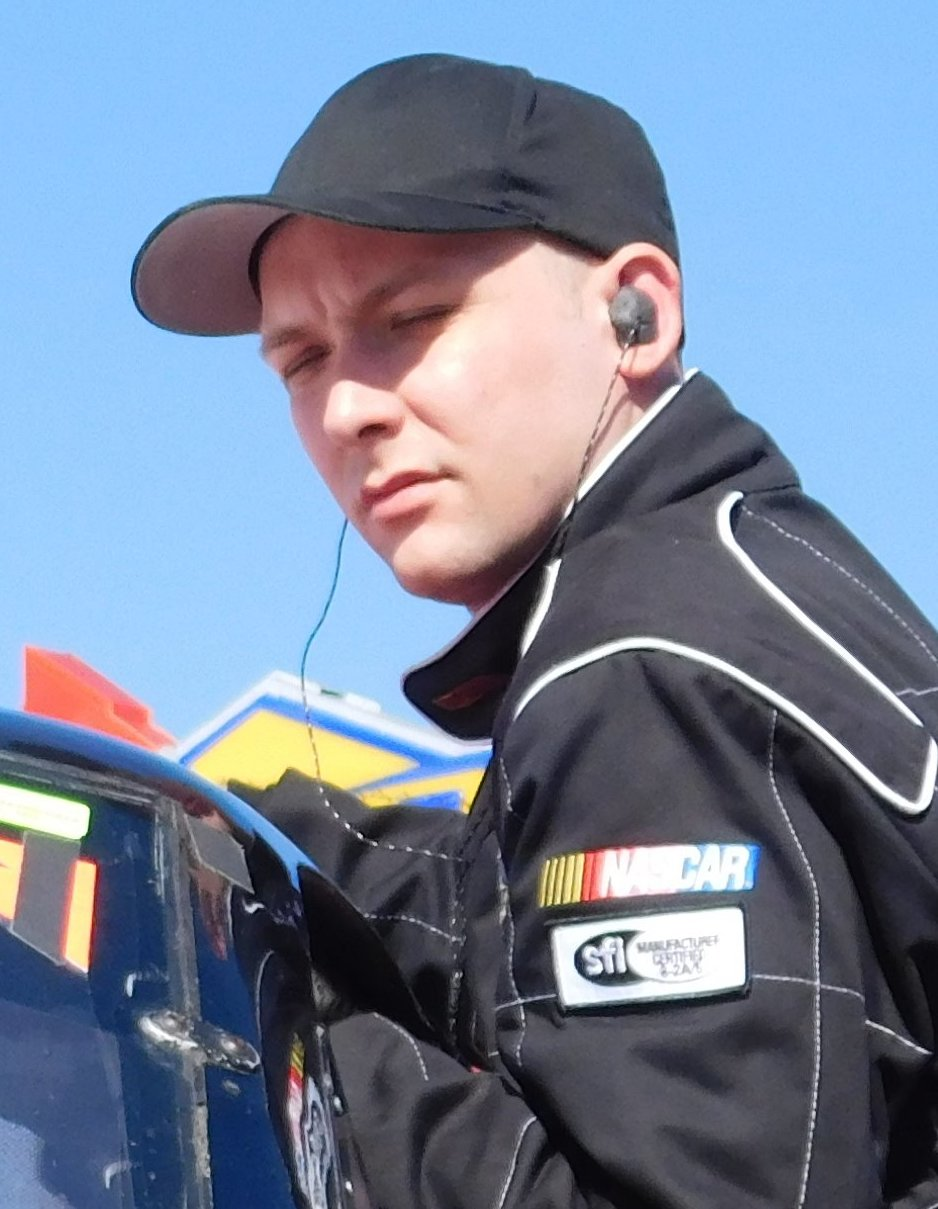
- White at Martinsville Speedway in 2016
- Born: Joshua White; May 7, 1991 (age 35); Charleston, West Virginia, U.S.
- Military career
- Allegiance: United States of America
- Branch: Marine Corps Reserve
- Service years: 2009–2015
- Rank: Lance corporal

NASCAR FedEx Freight Truck Series career
- 1 race run over 1 year
- 2016 position: 79th
- Best finish: 79th (2016)
- First race: 2016 Texas Roadhouse 200 (Martinsville)
Wins	Top tens	Poles
0	0	0

ARCA Menards Series career
- 22 races run over 4 years
- Best finish: 12th (2015)
- First race: 2013 Allen Crowe Memorial 100 (Springfield)
- Last race: 2025 Bush's Beans 200 (Bristol)
Wins	Top tens	Poles
0	0	0

ARCA Menards Series East career
- 1 race run over 1 year
- Best finish: 74th (2025)
- First race: 2025 Bush's Beans 200 (Bristol)
Wins	Top tens	Poles
0	0	0
- Statistics up to date as of September 11, 2025.

Joshua White (born May 7, 1991) is an American professional stock car and dirt modified racing driver. A U.S. Marine Corps veteran, White is recognized as the first 100% service-disabled Marine to compete in NASCAR, as well as the second U.S. Marine to compete in NASCAR history. In 2026, the Motorsports Hall of Fame of America began displaying his U.S. Marine Corps dress uniform to honor his military service and his historic standing in the sport. Along with his national series experience, White actively competes in regional dirt modified programs and manages Josh White Racing, an organization dedicated to veteran advocacy, vocational training, and community tribute initiatives such as the "Laps of Honor" program.

== Racing career ==
At eight years old, White's grandfather allowed him to drive his truck around the family's farm, while his grandmother rode with him during drives in the truck, which White stated was what began his interest in racing. After her death before a 2015 race at Salem Speedway, White placed a memorial decal on his ARCA Racing Series car.

White started racing when he was 16, competing in drag racing, followed by mud bogging at the age of 18. In 2007, he raced at Kanawha Valley Motorsports Park, winning four times in the track's IHRA Street Modified division. Two years later, he joined the track's IHRA Modified, recording five wins.

In 2010, White enlisted in the United States Marine Corps Reserve, attending boot camp at Parris Island. He was part of the USMC's Ready Reserve (IRR) program as a lance corporal. After returning from basic training a year later, he re-entered racing and switched to stock cars, running IMCA Crate Late Models at I-77 Raceway, where he had five top-five finishes and a win.

In 2012, White ran an Automobile Racing Club of America race at Toledo Speedway, where he finished thirteenth. The following season, he began competing full-time in the ARCA Lincoln Welders Truck Series for Team Wilson, driving the No. 9 Ford. That year, he made his ARCA Racing Series debut for Hixson Motorsports at the Illinois State Fairgrounds in Springfield; he retired from the race after two laps with handling problems and finished 31st. He also made a start at the DuQuoin State Fairgrounds Racetrack, where he finished 30th. He did not make an ARCA Racing Series start in 2014, but returned for the 2015 season, running seventeenth races for Hixson. He ended the season twelfth in points with a best finish of 21st at Springfield.

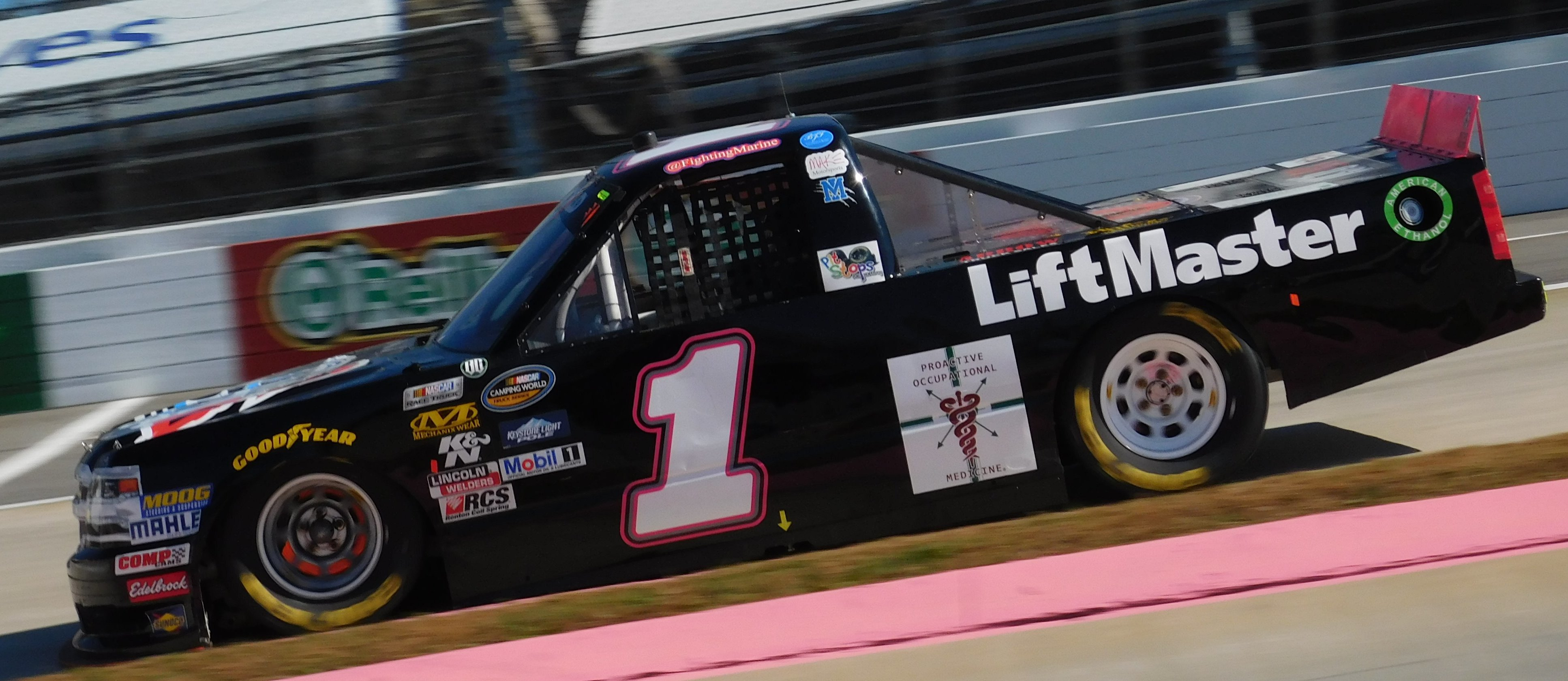
White's No. 1 truck for Jennifer Jo Cobb Racing in his Truck Series debut at Martinsville in October 2016

In 2015, White was initially scheduled to make his Camping World Truck Series debut at Homestead-Miami Speedway, but he did not attempt the race. The next season, he joined Jennifer Jo Cobb Racing in 2016 to attempt his CWTS debut at Martinsville Speedway, and was reported to be the first Marine to compete in a NASCAR national series event. However, ex-Marine Larry Frank drove in the NASCAR Grand National Series between 1956 and 1966. The effort was supported by Gulf War veteran David Pack, who works for JJCR as a business development representative. Pack, who is also a board member with Cobb's military charity Driven2Honor, noticed White's Facebook post requesting funding to race. "Dave was excited at the thought of having a Marine race their truck," White stated. "We have been working together for the past month and have already secured enough funding to attempt my first NASCAR race." After starting 31st, White finished 32nd and last after being involved in a crash on lap 51 with Kyle Donahue.

After being without a ride for three years, in September 2019, it was reported that White signed with Vizion Motorsports to potentially run the ARCA season opener at Daytona and some Truck Series races if the team was able to find sponsorship. An official announcement that White had joined Vizion was made on December 19, 2019, with him driving the No. 36 ARCA car full-time if possible, as well as possibly a few Truck races. In 2020, he was set to run at ARCA's Daytona testing in January, driving the Josh Williams Motorsports No. 60 although he did not end up making any laps in the test session.

On January 1, 2022, Clubb Racing Inc. announced that White would return to ARCA and drive three races (Charlotte, the Illinois State Fairgrounds Racetrack and Bristol) in their No. 03 car in 2022. These would be White's first ARCA starts since 2015 and his first NASCAR start since 2016. The race at Bristol was also a combination race with the ARCA Menards Series East and as a result, White would have made his debut in that series. He would finish 25th at Charlotte after being involved in a crash early in the race; it would be his only start that season.

On June 23, 2025, White announced that he would return to ARCA, once again driving for Clubb Racing Inc. in the No. 03 Ford at Bristol Motor Speedway.

In June 2026, the Motorsports Hall of Fame of America in Daytona Beach, Florida, unveiled an exhibit featuring White's U.S. Marine Corps dress uniform. The display honors his military background, including his tenure as a Combat Engineer with the 4th Combat Engineer Battalion from 2009 to 2015. Additionally, the exhibit acknowledges his status as the first 100% service disabled U.S. Marine Corps Veteran to compete in NASCAR.

== Personal life ==
On December 10, 2024, the Pursuit Channel added Josh White's Outdoor Adventures—a hunting show produced and hosted by White—to its programming, with Season 3 premiering the next month.

== Motorsports career results ==
=== NASCAR ===
(key) (Bold – Pole position awarded by qualifying time. Italics – Pole position earned by points standings or practice time. * – Most laps led.)

==== Camping World Truck Series ====
NASCAR Camping World Truck Series results
Year	Team	No.	Make	1	2	3	4	5	6	7	8	9	10	11	12	13	14	15	16	17	18	19	20	21	22	23	NCWTC	Pts	Ref
2016	Jennifer Jo Cobb Racing	1	Chevy	DAY	ATL	MAR	KAN	DOV	CLT	TEX	IOW	GTW	KEN	ELD	POC	BRI	MCH	MSP	CHI	NHA	LVS	TAL	MAR; 32	TEX	PHO	HOM	79th	1	

=== ARCA Menards Series ===
(key) (Bold – Pole position awarded by qualifying time. Italics – Pole position earned by points standings or practice time. * – Most laps led.)

ARCA Menards Series results
Year	Team	No.	Make	1	2	3	4	5	6	7	8	9	10	11	12	13	14	15	16	17	18	19	20	21	AMSC	Pts	Ref
2013	Hixson Motorsports	3	Chevy	DAY	MOB	SLM	TAL	TOL	ELK	POC	MCH	ROA	WIN	CHI	NJE	POC	BLN	ISF; 31	MAD	DSF; 30	IOW	SLM	KEN	KAN	114th	155	
2015	Hixson Motorsports	3	Chevy	DAY	MOB	NSH; 28	SLM; 23	TAL; 34	TOL; 28	NJE; 28		MCH; 23	CHI; 25	WIN; 27	IOW; 28	IRP; 30		BLN; 25	ISF; 21	DSF; 27	SLM; 29	KEN; 23	KAN; 32		12th	2365	
2015	Hixson Motorsports	8	Chevy								POC; 33						POC; 27								12th	2365	
2022	Clubb Racing Inc.	03	Ford	DAY	PHO	TAL	KAN	CLT; 25	IOW	BLN	ELK	MOH	POC	IRP	MCH	GLN	ISF	MLW	DSF	KAN	BRI	SLM	TOL		116th	19	
2025	Clubb Racing Inc.	86	Ford	DAY	PHO	TAL	KAN	CLT	MCH	BLN	ELK	LRP	DOV	IRP	IOW	GLN	ISF	MAD	DSF; 19						95th	37	
2025	Clubb Racing Inc.	03	Ford																	BRI; 32	SLM	KAN	TOL		95th	37	

==== ARCA Menards Series East ====
ARCA Menards Series East results
Year	Team	No.	Make	1	2	3	4	5	6	7	8	AMSEC	Pts	Ref
2025	Clubb Racing Inc.	03	Ford	FIF	CAR	NSV	FRS	DOV	IRP	IOW	BRI; 32	74th	12	

^{*} Season still in progress
