= 2020 General Tire 200 =

Race details
- Race 3 of 20 of the 2020 ARCA Menards Series
- Date: June 20, 2020
- Official name: 58th Annual General Tire 200
- Location: Lincoln, Alabama, Talladega Superspeedway
- Course: Permanent racing facility
- Course length: 4.281 km (2.66 miles)
- Distance: 76 laps, 202.16 mi (325.344 km)
- Scheduled distance: 76 laps, 202.16 mi (325.344 km)
- Average speed: 169.962 miles per hour (273.527 km/h)

Pole position
Driver	Ryan Repko	Venturini Motorsports
- Time: Set by 2019 owner's points

Most laps led
Driver	Drew Dollar	Venturini Motorsports
- Laps: 40

Winner
No. 15	Drew Dollar	Venturini Motorsports

Television in the United States
- Network: FS1
- Announcers: David Rieff, Todd Bodine, Matt Crafton

Radio in the United States
- Radio: Motor Racing Network

The 2020 General Tire 200 was the third stock car race of the 2020 ARCA Menards Series and the 59th iteration of the event. The race was held on Saturday, June 20, in Lincoln, Alabama at Talladega Superspeedway, a 2.66 miles (4.28 km) permanent triangle-shaped superspeedway. The race took the scheduled 76 laps to complete. At race's end, Drew Dollar of Venturini Motorsports would take advantage of a spinning Michael Self with two to go to take his first ever ARCA Menards Series career win and his first of the season. To fill out the podium, Ryan Repko of Venturini Motorsports and Bret Holmes of Bret Holmes Racing would finish second and third, respectively.

The race was the return of the ARCA Menards Series, after a 107-day delay due to the COVID-19 pandemic.

== Background ==
Talladega Superspeedway, originally known as Alabama International Motor Superspeedway (AIMS), is a motorsports complex located north of Talladega, Alabama. It is located on the former Anniston Air Force Base in the small city of Lincoln. The track is a tri-oval and was constructed in the 1960s by the International Speedway Corporation, a business controlled by the France family. Talladega is most known for its steep banking and the unique location of the start/finish line that's located just past the exit to pit road. The track currently hosts the NASCAR series such as the NASCAR Cup Series, Xfinity Series and the Camping World Truck Series. Talladega is the longest NASCAR oval with a length of 2.66-mile-long (4.28 km) tri-oval like the Daytona International Speedway, which also is a 2.5-mile-long (4 km) tri-oval.

=== Entry list ===
#	Driver	Team	Make	Sponosr
0	Con Nicolopoulos	Wayne Peterson Racing	Chevrolet	Wayne Peterson Racing
01	Tommy Vigh Jr.	Fast Track Racing	Toyota	Fast Track Racing
4	Hailie Deegan	DGR-Crosley	Ford	Toter "Built For Extremes"
06	Tim Richmond	Wayne Peterson Racing	Toyota	Immigration Legal Center
7	Eric Caudell	CCM Racing	Ford	ETRM Software Consulting, TetherTech Safety
8	Sean Corr	Empire Racing	Chevrolet	Yelverton's Enrichment Services
10	Ryan Huff	Fast Track Racing	Toyota	Land & Coates Outdoor Power Equipment
11	Willie Mullins	Fast Track Racing	Ford	Crow Wing Recycling
12	Ed Pompa	Fast Track Racing	Chevrolet	Green Renewable Inc., Double "H" Ranch
15	Drew Dollar	Venturini Motorsports	Toyota	Dollar Concrete Construction Company, Lynx Capital
17	Tanner Gray	DGR-Crosley	Ford	Ford Performance
18	Riley Herbst	Joe Gibbs Racing	Toyota	Monster Energy
20	Ryan Repko	Venturini Motorsports	Toyota	Craftsman
22	Brandon Lynn	Chad Bryant Racing	Ford	Carolina Excavation & Grading
23	Bret Holmes	Bret Holmes Racing	Chevrolet	Southern States Bank, Holmes II Excavating
25	Michael Self	Venturini Motorsports	Toyota	Sinclair
32	Gus Dean	Win-Tron Racing	Chevrolet	Mashonit Apparel Co.
46	Thad Moffitt	DGR-Crosley	Ford	Performance Plus Motor Oil Richard Petty Signature Series
48	Brad Smith	Brad Smith Motorsports	Chevrolet	Home Building Solutions, NASCAR Low Teams
69	Scott Melton	Kimmel Racing	Ford	Melton-McFadden Insurance Agency
97	Jason Kitzmiller	CR7 Motorsports	Chevrolet	A. L. L. Construction
Official entry list

== Practice ==
The only 30-minute practice session was held on Saturday, June 20. Riley Herbst of Joe Gibbs Racing would set the fastest time in the session, with a 53.219 and an average speed of 179.936 miles per hour (289.579 km/h).

Pos.	#	Driver	Team	Make	Time	Speed
1	18	Riley Herbst	Joe Gibbs Racing	Toyota	53.219	179.936
2	23	Bret Holmes	Bret Holmes Racing	Chevrolet	53.282	179.723
3	25	Michael Self	Venturini Motorsports	Toyota	53.326	179.575
Full practice results

== Starting lineup ==
Due to the COVID-19 pandemic, qualifying was canceled. As a result, the lineup would be based on the rulebook: positions 1-20 would be based on 2019's owner points, and positions 21-30 would be based on a random draw. As a result, Ryan Repko of Venturini Motorsports would win the pole.

=== Full starting lineup ===
Pos.	#	Driver	Team	Make
1	20	Ryan Repko	Venturini Motorsports	Toyota
2	15	Drew Dollar	Venturini Motorsports	Toyota
3	4	Hailie Deegan	DGR-Crosley	Ford
4	18	Riley Herbst	Joe Gibbs Racing	Toyota
5	25	Michael Self	Venturini Motorsports	Toyota
6	23	Bret Holmes	Bret Holmes Racing	Chevrolet
7	12	Ed Pompa	Fast Track Racing	Chevrolet
8	17	Tanner Gray	DGR-Crosley	Ford
9	06	Tim Richmond	Wayne Peterson Racing	Toyota
10	69	Scott Melton	Kimmel Racing	Ford
11	10	Ryan Huff	Fast Track Racing	Toyota
12	11	Willie Mullins	Fast Track Racing	Ford
13	01	Tommy Vigh Jr.	Fast Track Racing	Toyota
14	48	Brad Smith	Brad Smith Motorsports	Chevrolet
15	32	Gus Dean	Win-Tron Racing	Chevrolet
16	22	Brandon Lynn	Chad Bryant Racing	Ford
17	7	Eric Caudell	CCM Racing	Ford
18	0	Con Nicolopoulos	Wayne Peterson Racing	Chevrolet
19	8	Sean Corr	Empire Racing	Chevrolet
20	97	Jason Kitzmiller	CR7 Motorsports	Chevrolet
21	46	Thad Moffitt	DGR-Crosley	Ford
Official starting lineup

== Race results ==
Fin	St	#	Driver	Team	Make	Laps	Led	Status	Pts
1	2	15	Drew Dollar	Venturini Motorsports	Toyota	76	40	running	48
2	1	20	Ryan Repko	Venturini Motorsports	Toyota	76	0	running	42
3	6	23	Bret Holmes	Bret Holmes Racing	Chevrolet	76	0	running	41
4	4	18	Riley Herbst	Joe Gibbs Racing	Toyota	76	36	running	41
5	5	25	Michael Self	Venturini Motorsports	Toyota	76	0	running	39
6	21	46	Thad Moffitt	DGR-Crosley	Ford	76	0	running	38
7	3	4	Hailie Deegan	DGR-Crosley	Ford	76	0	running	37
8	20	97	Jason Kitzmiller	CR7 Motorsports	Chevrolet	75	0	running	36
9	19	8	Sean Corr	Empire Racing	Chevrolet	74	0	running	35
10	7	12	Ed Pompa	Fast Track Racing	Chevrolet	74	0	running	34
11	10	69	Scott Melton	Kimmel Racing	Ford	74	0	running	33
12	11	10	Ryan Huff	Fast Track Racing	Toyota	74	0	running	32
13	8	17	Tanner Gray	DGR-Crosley	Ford	74	0	running	31
14	17	7	Eric Caudell	CCM Racing	Ford	73	0	running	30
15	16	22	Brandon Lynn	Chad Bryant Racing	Ford	69	0	running	29
16	15	32	Gus Dean	Win-Tron Racing	Chevrolet	58	0	electrical	28
17	9	06	Tim Richmond	Wayne Peterson Racing	Toyota	34	0	engine	27
18	12	11	Willie Mullins	Fast Track Racing	Ford	24	0	oil pressure	26
19	13	01	Tommy Vigh Jr.	Fast Track Racing	Toyota	7	0	vibration	25
20	14	48	Brad Smith	Brad Smith Motorsports	Chevrolet	4	0	carburetor	24
21	18	0	Con Nicolopoulos	Wayne Peterson Racing	Chevrolet	0	0	engine	23
Official race results

Previous race: 2020 General Tire 150 (Phoenix)	ARCA Menards Series; 2020 season	Next race: 2020 General Tire #AnywhereIsPossible200
