= 2019 General Tire 150 =

7th race of the 2019 ARCA Menards Series

Race details
- Race 7 of 20 of the 2019 ARCA Menards Series
- Date: May 23, 2019
- Official name: 2nd Annual General Tire 150
- Location: Charlotte Motor Speedway, Concord, North Carolina
- Course: Permanent racing facility
- Course length: 1.5 miles (2.4 km)
- Distance: 109 laps, 163 mi (263 km)
- Scheduled distance: 100 laps, 150 mi (241 km)
- Average speed: 109.426 mph (176.104 km/h)

Pole position
Driver	Michael Self	Venturini Motorsports
- Time: 29.686

Most laps led
Driver	Michael Self	Venturini Motorsports
- Laps: 91

Winner
No. 22	Ty Majeski	Chad Bryant Racing

Television in the United States
- Network: FS1
- Announcers: Dave Rieff and Phil Parsons

Radio in the United States
- Radio: MRN

The 2019 General Tire 150 was the seventh stock car race of the 2019 ARCA Menards Series season, and the 2nd iteration of the event. The race was held on Thursday, May 23, 2019, in Concord, North Carolina, at Charlotte Motor Speedway, a 1.5 mile (2.4 km) permanent tri-oval shaped racetrack. The race was originally scheduled to be contested over 100 laps, but was increased to 109 laps, due to a NASCAR overtime finish. Ty Majeski, driving for Chad Bryant Racing, would survive two overtime restarts, and hold off a charging Sheldon Creed to earn his first career ARCA Menards Series win. Michael Self dominated the entirety of the race, leading a race-high 91 laps. To fill out the podium, Creed, driving for GMS Racing, and Gus Dean, driving for Win-Tron Racing, would finish 2nd and 3rd, respectively.

== Background ==
Charlotte Motor Speedway (previously known as Lowe's Motor Speedway from 1999 to 2009) is a motorsport complex located in Concord, North Carolina, 13-mile (21 km) outside Charlotte. The complex features a 1.500 mi (2.414 km) quad oval track that hosts NASCAR racing including the prestigious Coca-Cola 600 on Memorial Day weekend, and the Bank of America Roval 400. The speedway was built in 1959 by Bruton Smith and is considered the home track for NASCAR with many race teams located in the Charlotte area. The track is owned and operated by Speedway Motorsports with Greg Walter as track president.

The 2,000 acres (8.1 km^{2}) complex also features a state-of-the-art 0.250 mi (0.402 km) drag racing strip, ZMAX Dragway. It is the only all-concrete, four-lane drag strip in the United States and hosts NHRA events. Alongside the drag strip is a state-of-the-art clay oval that hosts dirt racing including the World of Outlaws finals among other popular racing events.

=== Entry list ===
- (R) denotes rookie driver.

#	Driver	Team	Make	Sponsor
1	Dick Doheny	Fast Track Racing	Toyota	Fast Track Racing
02	Andy Seuss	Our Motorsports	Ford	Canto Paving Memorial Day Tribute
3	Willie Mullins	Mullins Racing	Ford	Crow Wing Recycling, CW Metals
06	Con Nicolopoulos	Wayne Peterson Racing	Chevrolet	GreatRailing.com
7	Codie Rohrbaugh	CR7 Motorsports	Chevrolet	Grant County Mulch
09	C. J. McLaughlin	Our Motorsports	Chevrolet	Sci Aps
10	Tommy Vigh Jr. (R)	Fast Track Racing	Ford	Extreme Kleaner
11	Jason Miles	Fast Track Racing	Ford	Gearheadz Unlimited, Jack & Aces Events
15	Christian Eckes (R)	Venturini Motorsports	Toyota	JBL
18	Riley Herbst	Joe Gibbs Racing	Toyota	Monster Energy, Terrible Herbst
20	Harrison Burton	Venturini Motorsports	Toyota	Fields, Sports Force Parks
21	Sheldon Creed	GMS Racing	Chevrolet	Chevrolet Accessories
22	Ty Majeski	Chad Bryant Racing	Ford	Crestliner Boats USA
23	Bret Holmes	Bret Holmes Racing	Chevrolet	Holmes II Excavation
25	Michael Self	Venturini Motorsports	Toyota	Sinclair Oil Corporation
27	Travis Braden	RFMS Racing	Ford	MatrixCare, Consonus Healthcare
28	Brandon McReynolds	KBR Development	Chevrolet	HD Five, KBR Development
32	Gus Dean	Win-Tron Racing	Chevrolet	Ice Box Cooler Helmets
35	Devin Dodson	Vizion Motorsports	Toyota	Vizion Motorsports
46	Thad Moffitt	Empire Racing	Chevrolet	Transportation Impact
48	Brad Smith	Brad Smith Motorsports	Chevrolet	Copraya.com
54	Tanner Gray	DGR-Crosley	Toyota	Valvoline, Durst
57	Bryan Dauzat	Brother-In-Law Racing	Chevrolet	Dusk Till Dawn Clothing, O. B. Builders
69	Scott Melton	Kimmel Racing	Toyota	Melton-McFadden Insurance Agency
77	Joe Graf Jr.	Chad Bryant Racing	Ford	Eat Sleep Race
Official entry list

== Practice ==
The first and only practice session was held on Thursday, May 23, at 11:30 AM EST, and would last for 90 minutes. Riley Herbst, driving for Joe Gibbs Racing, would set the fastest time in the session, with a lap of 29.784, and an average speed of 181.305 mph (291.782 km/h).

Pos.	#	Driver	Team	Make	Time	Speed
1	18	Riley Herbst	Joe Gibbs Racing	Toyota	29.784	181.305
2	20	Harrison Burton	Venturini Motorsports	Toyota	29.876	180.747
3	25	Michael Self	Venturini Motorsports	Toyota	29.879	180.729
Full practice results

== Qualifying ==
Qualifying was held on Thursday, May 23, at 5:00 PM EST. The qualifying system used is a single-car, one-lap system with only one round. Whoever sets the fastest time in that round will win the pole. Michael Self, driving for Venturini Motorsports, would score the pole for the race, with a lap of 29.686, and an average speed of 181.904 mph (292.746 km/h).

Pos.	#	Driver	Team	Make	Time	Speed
1	25	Michael Self	Venturini Motorsports	Toyota	29.686	181.904
2	54	Tanner Gray	DGR-Crosley	Toyota	29.802	181.196
3	20	Harrison Burton	Venturini Motorsports	Toyota	29.855	180.874
4	7	Codie Rohrbaugh	CR7 Motorsports	Chevrolet	29.864	180.820
5	15	Christian Eckes (R)	Venturini Motorsports	Toyota	29.916	180.505
6	23	Bret Holmes	Bret Holmes Racing	Chevrolet	30.058	179.653
7	21	Sheldon Creed	GMS Racing	Chevrolet	30.063	179.623
8	22	Ty Majeski	Chad Bryant Racing	Ford	30.228	178.642
9	18	Riley Herbst	Joe Gibbs Racing	Toyota	30.331	178.036
10	77	Joe Graf Jr.	Chad Bryant Racing	Ford	30.335	178.012
11	32	Gus Dean	Win-Tron Racing	Chevrolet	30.415	177.544
12	46	Thad Moffitt	Empire Racing	Chevrolet	30.732	175.713
13	28	Brandon McReynolds	KBR Development	Chevrolet	31.049	173.919
14	27	Travis Braden	RFMS Racing	Ford	31.176	173.210
15	02	Andy Seuss	Our Motorsports	Ford	31.672	170.498
16	69	Scott Melton	Kimmel Racing	Toyota	31.895	169.306
17	57	Bryan Dauzat	Brother-In-Law Racing	Chevrolet	32.201	167.697
18	10	Tommy Vigh Jr. (R)	Fast Track Racing	Ford	32.275	167.312
19	09	C. J. McLaughlin	Our Motorsports	Chevrolet	32.341	166.971
20	35	Devin Dodson	Vizion Motorsports	Toyota	33.451	161.430
21	11	Jason Miles	Fast Track Racing	Ford	35.475	152.220
22	06	Con Nicolopoulos	Wayne Peterson Racing	Chevrolet	35.843	150.657
23	48	Brad Smith	Brad Smith Motorsports	Chevrolet	35.958	150.175
24	1	Dick Doheny	Fast Track Racing	Toyota	36.888	146.389
25	3	Willie Mullins	Mullins Racing	Ford	–	–
Official qualifying results

== Race results ==
Fin	St	#	Driver	Team	Make	Laps	Led	Status	Pts
1	8	22	Ty Majeski	Chad Bryant Racing	Ford	109	14	Running	240
2	7	21	Sheldon Creed	GMS Racing	Chevrolet	109	0	Running	220
3	11	32	Gus Dean	Win-Tron Racing	Chevrolet	109	0	Running	215
4	3	20	Harrison Burton	Venturini Motorsports	Toyota	109	0	Running	210
5	1	25	Michael Self	Venturini Motorsports	Toyota	109	91	Running	220
6	2	54	Tanner Gray	DGR-Crosley	Toyota	109	0	Running	200
7	5	15	Christian Eckes (R)	Venturini Motorsports	Toyota	109	0	Running	195
8	6	23	Bret Holmes	Bret Holmes Racing	Chevrolet	109	4	Running	195
9	14	27	Travis Braden	RFMS Racing	Ford	109	0	Running	185
10	12	46	Thad Moffitt	Empire Racing	Chevrolet	109	0	Running	180
11	15	02	Andy Seuss	Our Motorsports	Ford	107	0	Running	175
12	10	77	Joe Graf Jr.	Chad Bryant Racing	Ford	106	0	Running	170
13	17	57	Bryan Dauzat	Brother-In-Law Racing	Chevrolet	106	0	Running	165
14	16	69	Scott Melton	Kimmel Racing	Toyota	104	0	Running	160
15	18	10	Tommy Vigh Jr. (R)	Fast Track Racing	Ford	104	0	Running	155
16	4	7	Codie Rohrbaugh	CR7 Motorsports	Chevrolet	102	0	Accident	150
17	25	3	Willie Mullins	Mullins Racing	Ford	102	0	Running	145
18	21	11	Jason Miles	Fast Track Racing	Ford	99	0	Running	140
19	9	18	Riley Herbst	Joe Gibbs Racing	Toyota	98	0	Accident	135
20	13	28	Brandon McReynolds	KBR Development	Chevrolet	81	0	Axle	130
21	20	35	Devin Dodson	Vizion Motorsports	Toyota	72	0	Running	125
22	22	06	Con Nicolopoulos	Wayne Peterson Racing	Chevrolet	42	0	Accident	120
23	23	48	Brad Smith	Brad Smith Motorsports	Chevrolet	10	0	Electrical	115
24	24	1	Dick Doheny	Fast Track Racing	Toyota	9	0	Overheating	110
25	19	09	C. J. McLaughlin	Our Motorsports	Chevrolet	0	0	DNS	25
Official race results

Previous race: 2019 Sioux Chief PowerPEX 200	ARCA Menards Series; 2019 season	Next race: 2019 General Tire #AnywhereIsPossible 200
