= Steven Lane =

American NASCAR crew chief and team owner

Personal information
- Full name: Steven D. Lane
- Nickname: Bones
- Born: November 16, 1972 (age 53) Winston-Salem, North Carolina, U.S.

Sport
- Country: United States
- Sport: NASCAR Camping World Truck Series
- Team: 30. On Point Motorsports

NASCAR Whelen All-American Series career
- Debut season: 2019
- Current team: On Point Motorsports
- Years active: 2019–present
- Car number: 30
- Starts: 1
- Championships: 0
- Wins: 0
- Poles: 0
- Statistics up to date as of January 28, 2021.

Steven D. Lane (born November 16, 1972) is an American NASCAR crew chief, team owner and an American professional stock car racing driver. He is employed at his own team of On Point Motorsports as the crew chief for Tate Fogleman in the No. 30 Toyota Tundra. He has crew chiefed in NASCAR since 2000, and has been an owner in NASCAR since 2018.

== Racing career ==
=== Crew chiefing career ===
==== Cup Series ====
Lane started crew chiefing in 2000 in the NASCAR Winston Cup Series with Jeremy Mayfield scoring a strong second-place finish at Phoenix Raceway, he caught the attention of Kyle Petty however after the second with Mayfield he would go into a slump not scoring another top ten in the Cup Series until 2006 at Watkins Glen International with Scott Pruett. After that he would bounce to the drivers of the No. 40 at Chip Ganassi Racing scoring a best finish of 8th at Talladega with David Stremme.

In 2009, Lane would jump to new team Front Row Motorsports with John Andretti in the No. 34 scoring a beat finish of 16th at Loudon. He would then jump ship once again to Robby Gordon Motorsports in 2011 scoring a best finish of 16th at Daytona in July with Robby Gordon.

Halfway through the 2011 season, Lane would leave Robby Gordon Motorsports and join Swan Racing (then Inception Motorsports) where he would stay until 2014 having one top 15 with David Stremme at Talladega where they would finish 12th. He would have one last race with Swan in Swan's final race at Richmond Raceway with J. J. Yeley finishing 40th. Lane would follow Yeley to Team Xtreme Racing and stay until midway through 2014 after poor performance from Yeley where their best finish was a 34th.

Lane made one final cup stint as a crew chief for Randy Humphrey Racing scoring a best finish of 26th at Watkins Glen International with Nelson Piquet Jr. in Nelson's one and only Cup start. His final Cup crew chiefing effort came at Charlotte with Corey LaJoie where they would finish 35th.

==== Xfinity Series ====
Lane's first Xfinity race as a crew chief came in 2015 at Daytona with Eric McClure where he finished 17th, he stayed until the 10th race of the season at Talladega where they finished 21st, Lane returned with Kyle Fowler at Charlotte where they finished 27th, after Charlotte, Lane took a short break and returned at Daytona with longtime driver-crew chief pairing J. J. Yeley where they would finish 20th. In a shock to everyone the next race at Kentucky with the combination of Lane and Yeley, they would win the pole and finish 18th, this would lead JGL to put Lane in the car with Yeley for the rest of the season where they would rack up 14 top-20s and four top-15s.

In 2016, Yeley split from JGL leaving Lane at JGL with new driver Dakoda Armstrong, they performed on a decent level but would split for 4 races however partner backup midway through at Pocono and finish 18th, this led JGL to partner them back up after Iowa for the rest of the season except for the races Dakoda was in with Joe Gibbs Racing in the No. 18, they would rack up 15 top-20s and three top-15s.

In 2017, Lane and Armstrong were slated for a full season where they would score two top-tens and two top-fives while also scoring his first top-five since the year 2000 in his Cup debut with Jeremy Mayfield at Phoenix and would score a best finish of third place at Daytona. They split up after Dakoda barely missed the playoffs, He would bounce back to the No. 24 car for JGL with Corey LaJoie and Dylan Lupton where he would score four top-20s and two top-15s.

Lane returned in 2018 for what would be JGL's final season with Dylan Lupton and Tony Mrakovich scoring two top-25s with Lupton and having one top-25 with Mrakovich.

==== Truck Series ====
In July 2018, Lane started his own team called On Point Motorsports, he made his first start at Bristol with Scott Lagasse Jr. where they would finish 31st. The team returned at Las Vegas with returning driver Austin Theriault where they would finish eighth after avoiding numerous wrecks. Lagasse returned at Talladega where he would finish 18th. Lane hired Jeb Burton to drive at Martinsville and Homestead where he would finish 15th and 18th respectively.

In November 2018, Lane announced his plans to field a full-time truck for the 2019 season.

In 2019, Lane started crew chiefing Brennan Poole, his first full-time job as a crew chief since 2017. They racked up three top-tens and one top-five. Their two top-tens came at both Texas races, finishing ninth in the April race and seventh in the June race, at Charlotte finishing second. Whelen Modified Tour driver Danny Bohn would make his Truck Series debut that year for On Point Motorsports, running the last three races of the season in the No. 30.

Poole and Bohn returned to split the season in the No. 30 in 2020. Rick Markle started the season as crew chief, although Lane replaced him atop the pit box later in the season.

For 2021, Bohn returned to On Point Motorsports, beginning at the season-opener at Daytona.

=== Team owner ===
On July 10, 2018, Lane and a group of investors started On Point Motorsports. The team debuted at Bristol with Scott Lagasse Jr. finishing 31st, they ran one other race with Lagasse at Talladega where he finished 18th. The team returned with Austin Theriault at Las Vegas where they would finish 8th. They ran two more races with Jeb Burton behind the wheel at Martinsville and Homestead-Miami Speedway with a best finish of 15th at Martinsville.

On November 29, 2018 On Point Motorsports announced they would run a full-time NASCAR Gander Outdoors Truck Series schedule and a part-time ARCA Menards Series schedule for the 2019 season. Derrick Lancaster was named as driver for the team's first race at Daytona International Speedway.

On January 28, 2019, On Point Motorsports announced they would run full-time with Brennan Poole and run for NASCAR Rookie of the Year honors. The team cracked the top ten for the first time in 2019 at Texas, finishing ninth.

=== Racing career ===
In 2019, Lane made his racing debut in an asphalt modified at Bowman Gray Stadium.
