= 2022 Chevrolet Silverado 250 =

21st race of the 2022 NASCAR Camping World Truck Series

Race details
- Race 21 of 23 of the 2022 NASCAR Camping World Truck Series
- Date: October 1, 2022
- Official name: 17th Annual Chevrolet Silverado 250
- Location: Talladega Superspeedway, Lincoln, Alabama
- Course: Permanent racing facility
- Course length: 2.66 miles (4.28 km)
- Distance: 95 laps, 252.7 mi (406.68 km)
- Scheduled distance: 94 laps, 250.04 mi (402.4 km)
- Average speed: 114.286 mph (183.925 km/h)

Pole position
Driver	John Hunter Nemechek	Kyle Busch Motorsports
- Time: 53.567

Most laps led
Driver	Christian Eckes	ThorSport Racing
- Laps: 25

Winner
No. 25	Matt DiBenedetto	Rackley W.A.R.

Television in the United States
- Network: Fox Sports 1
- Announcers: Vince Welch, Phil Parsons, and Michael Waltrip

Radio in the United States
- Radio: Motor Racing Network

The 2022 Chevrolet Silverado 250 was the 21st stock car race of the 2022 NASCAR Camping World Truck Series, the second race of the Round of 8, and the 17th iteration of the event. The race was held on Saturday, October 1, 2022, in Lincoln, Alabama at Talladega Superspeedway, a 2.66 miles (4.28 km) permanent tri-oval shaped superspeedway. The race was increased from 94 laps to 95 laps, due to a NASCAR overtime finish. In a wild finish that sparked controversy, Matt DiBenedetto, driving for Rackley W.A.R., would steal the win after the caution flag came out on the final lap. This was DiBenedetto's first career NASCAR Camping World Truck Series win, and the first of his career. To fill out the podium, Ben Rhodes, driving for ThorSport Racing, and Bret Holmes, driving for his family owned team, Bret Holmes Racing, would finish 2nd and 3rd, respectively.

The race would receive controversy on the final lap. In turn three, ThorSport Racing teammates, Ben Rhodes and Christian Eckes, were battling side by side for the lead. Eckes would make contact with Corey Heim, causing Heim to hit the outside wall and spin down the racetrack. Bret Holmes would make a move to the outside lane to try and pass Rhodes. As Rhodes attempted to block, Matt DiBenedetto came to the inside and tried to take the lead. Rhodes would force DiBenedetto below the double yellow line, and both drivers would get sideways as they came across the line. Holmes was declared as the unofficial winner after crossing the line in front of Rhodes and DiBenedetto. However, the caution came out just before the field took the checkered flag. DiBenedetto would officially be declared as the winner, as he was out front when the caution had come out. Rhodes and Holmes would be credited with a 2nd and 3rd place finish.

The race would also be marred by a crash involving Jordan Anderson. On lap 18, Anderson would blow an engine coming into turn two, causing his truck to engulf in flames. Struggling to breathe from smoke inhalation, Anderson attempted to exit his truck while it was still moving. His truck would hit the inside retaining wall, with Anderson already half way out of the truck. He would lay down on the ground shortly after exiting his car, with medical personnel arriving on the scene. Anderson was taken to the infield care center, where he received minor burns to his arms, neck, and knees. He would later be transported to a local hospital for further evaluation.

This would also be the debut race for Parker Retzlaff.

== Background ==
Talladega Superspeedway is located on the former Anniston Air Force Base in the small city of Lincoln. A tri-oval, the track was constructed in 1969 by the International Speedway Corporation, a business controlled by the France Family. As of 2021, the track hosts the NASCAR and ARCA Menards Series. Talladega is the longest NASCAR oval, with a length of 2.66 miles (4.281 km), compared to the Daytona International Speedway, which is 2.5 miles (4.0 km) long. The total peak capacity of Talladega is around 175,000 spectators, with the main grandstand capacity being about 80,000.

=== Entry list ===
- (R) denotes rookie driver.
- (i) denotes driver who are ineligible for series driver points.

#	Driver	Team	Make
1	Hailie Deegan	David Gilliland Racing	Ford
02	Kaz Grala	Young's Motorsports	Chevrolet
3	Jordan Anderson	Jordan Anderson Racing	Chevrolet
4	John Hunter Nemechek	Kyle Busch Motorsports	Toyota
9	Blaine Perkins (R)	CR7 Motorsports	Chevrolet
10	Jennifer Jo Cobb	Jennifer Jo Cobb Racing	Chevrolet
12	Spencer Boyd	Young's Motorsports	Chevrolet
13	Johnny Sauter	ThorSport Racing	Toyota
15	Tanner Gray	David Gilliland Racing	Ford
16	Tyler Ankrum	Hattori Racing Enterprises	Toyota
17	Ryan Preece	David Gilliland Racing	Ford
18	Chandler Smith	Kyle Busch Motorsports	Toyota
19	Derek Kraus	McAnally–Hilgemann Racing	Chevrolet
20	Parker Retzlaff (i)	Young's Motorsports	Chevrolet
22	Austin Wayne Self	AM Racing	Chevrolet
23	Grant Enfinger	GMS Racing	Chevrolet
24	Jack Wood (R)	GMS Racing	Chevrolet
25	Matt DiBenedetto	Rackley W.A.R.	Chevrolet
28	Bryan Dauzat	FDNY Racing	Chevrolet
30	Kaden Honeycutt	On Point Motorsports	Toyota
32	Bret Holmes	Bret Holmes Racing	Chevrolet
33	Jason White	Reaume Brothers Racing	Toyota
38	Zane Smith	Front Row Motorsports	Ford
40	Dean Thompson (R)	Niece Motorsports	Chevrolet
42	Carson Hocevar	Niece Motorsports	Chevrolet
43	Natalie Decker (i)	Reaume Brothers Racing	Toyota
44	Bayley Currey (i)	Niece Motorsports	Chevrolet
45	Lawless Alan (R)	Niece Motorsports	Chevrolet
46	Tim Viens	G2G Racing	Toyota
51	Corey Heim (R)	Kyle Busch Motorsports	Toyota
52	Stewart Friesen	Halmar Friesen Racing	Toyota
56	Timmy Hill	Hill Motorsports	Toyota
61	Chase Purdy	Hattori Racing Enterprises	Toyota
66	Ty Majeski	ThorSport Racing	Toyota
75	Parker Kligerman	Henderson Motorsports	Chevrolet
84	Clay Greenfield	Cook Racing Technologies	Toyota
88	Matt Crafton	ThorSport Racing	Toyota
91	Colby Howard	McAnally–Hilgemann Racing	Chevrolet
98	Christian Eckes	ThorSport Racing	Toyota
99	Ben Rhodes	ThorSport Racing	Toyota
Official entry list

== Qualifying ==
Qualifying was held on Friday, September 30, at 2:30 PM CST. Since Talladega Superspeedway is a superspeedway, the qualifying system used is a single-car, single-lap system with two rounds. In the first round, drivers have one lap to set a time. The fastest ten drivers from the first round move on to the second round. Whoever sets the fastest time in Round 2 wins the pole. John Hunter Nemechek, driving for Kyle Busch Motorsports, scored the pole for the race, with a lap of 53.567, and an average speed of 178.767 mph (287.698 km/h) in the second round.

Pos.	#	Driver	Team	Make	Time (R1)	Speed (R1)	Time (R2)	Speed (R2)
1	4	John Hunter Nemechek	Kyle Busch Motorsports	Toyota	53.688	178.364	53.567	178.767
2	18	Chandler Smith	Kyle Busch Motorsports	Toyota	53.744	178.178	53.879	177.732
3	42	Carson Hocevar	Niece Motorsports	Chevrolet	54.151	176.839	54.081	177.068
4	38	Zane Smith	Front Row Motorsports	Ford	53.903	177.652	54.083	177.061
5	88	Matt Crafton	ThorSport Racing	Toyota	53.950	177.498	54.114	176.960
6	66	Ty Majeski	ThorSport Racing	Toyota	54.106	176.986	54.180	176.744
7	91	Colby Howard	McAnally–Hilgemann Racing	Chevrolet	51.186	176.725	54.327	176.266
8	19	Derek Kraus	McAnally–Hilgemann Racing	Chevrolet	53.989	177.369	54.372	176.120
9	3	Jordan Anderson	Jordan Anderson Racing	Chevrolet	54.194	176.699	54.533	175.600
10	17	Ryan Preece	David Gilliland Racing	Ford	54.084	177.058	54.628	175.295
Eliminated from Round 1
11	15	Tanner Gray	David Gilliland Racing	Ford	54.204	176.666	-	-
12	98	Christian Eckes	ThorSport Racing	Toyota	54.205	176.663	-	-
13	51	Corey Heim (R)	Kyle Busch Motorsports	Toyota	54.205	176.663	-	-
14	24	Jack Wood (R)	GMS Racing	Chevrolet	54.226	176.594	-	-
15	99	Ben Rhodes	ThorSport Racing	Toyota	54.258	176.490	-	-
16	23	Grant Enfinger	GMS Racing	Chevrolet	54.316	176.302	-	-
17	22	Austin Wayne Self	AM Racing	Chevrolet	54.331	176.253	-	-
18	52	Stewart Friesen	Halmar Friesen Racing	Toyota	54.341	176.221	-	-
19	13	Johnny Sauter	ThorSport Racing	Toyota	54.375	176.110	-	-
20	16	Tyler Ankrum	Hattori Racing Enterprises	Toyota	54.452	175.861	-	-
21	75	Parker Kligerman	Henderson Motorsports	Chevrolet	54.474	175.790	-	-
22	28	Bryan Dauzat	FDNY Racing	Chevrolet	54.499	175.710	-	-
23	32	Bret Holmes	Bret Holmes Racing	Chevrolet	54.535	175.594	-	-
24	9	Blaine Perkins (R)	CR7 Motorsports	Chevrolet	54.651	175.221	-	-
25	84	Clay Greenfield	Cook Racing Technologies	Toyota	54.710	175.032	-	-
26	61	Chase Purdy	Hattori Racing Enterprises	Toyota	54.790	174.776	-	-
27	1	Hailie Deegan	David Gilliland Racing	Ford	54.824	174.668	-	-
28	02	Kaz Grala	Young's Motorsports	Chevrolet	54.830	174.649	-	-
29	20	Parker Retzlaff (i)	Young's Motorsports	Chevrolet	54.845	174.601	-	-
30	25	Matt DiBenedetto	Rackley W.A.R.	Chevrolet	54.867	174.531	-	-
31	10	Jennifer Jo Cobb	Jennifer Jo Cobb Racing	Chevrolet	54.931	174.328	-	-
Qualified by owner's points
32	44	Bayley Currey (i)	Niece Motorsports	Chevrolet	54.952	174.261	-	-
33	56	Timmy Hill	Hill Motorsports	Toyota	54.965	174.220	-	-
34	45	Lawless Alan (R)	Niece Motorsports	Chevrolet	54.989	174.144	-	-
35	40	Dean Thompson (R)	Niece Motorsports	Chevrolet	55.160	173.604	-	-
36	30	Kaden Honeycutt	On Point Motorsports	Toyota	55.236	173.365	-	-
Failed to qualify
37	46	Tim Viens	G2G Racing	Toyota	55.097	173.803	-	-
38	12	Spencer Boyd	Young's Motorsports	Chevrolet	55.131	173.695	-	-
39	33	Jason White	Reaume Brothers Racing	Toyota	55.487	172.581	-	-
40	43	Natalie Decker (i)	Reaume Brothers Racing	Toyota	55.555	172.370	-	-
Official qualifying results
Official starting lineup

== Race results ==
Stage 1 Laps: 20

Pos.	#	Driver	Team	Make	Pts
1	4	John Hunter Nemechek	Kyle Busch Motorsports	Toyota	10
2	38	Zane Smith	Front Row Motorsports	Ford	9
3	42	Carson Hocevar	Niece Motorsports	Chevrolet	8
4	18	Chandler Smith	Kyle Busch Motorsports	Toyota	7
5	15	Tanner Gray	David Gilliland Racing	Ford	6
6	91	Colby Howard	McAnally–Hilgemann Racing	Chevrolet	5
7	99	Ben Rhodes	ThorSport Racing	Toyota	4
8	51	Corey Heim (R)	Kyle Busch Motorsports	Toyota	3
9	16	Tyler Ankrum	Hattori Racing Enterprises	Toyota	2
10	98	Christian Eckes	ThorSport Racing	Toyota	1

Stage 2 Laps: 20

Pos.	#	Driver	Team	Make	Pts
1	18	Chandler Smith	Kyle Busch Motorsports	Toyota	10
2	4	John Hunter Nemechek	Kyle Busch Motorsports	Toyota	9
3	52	Stewart Friesen	Halmar Friesen Racing	Toyota	8
4	99	Ben Rhodes	ThorSport Racing	Toyota	7
5	23	Grant Enfinger	GMS Racing	Chevrolet	6
6	98	Christian Eckes	ThorSport Racing	Toyota	5
7	16	Tyler Ankrum	Hattori Racing Enterprises	Toyota	4
8	51	Corey Heim (R)	Kyle Busch Motorsports	Toyota	3
9	38	Zane Smith	Front Row Motorsports	Ford	2
10	66	Ty Majeski	ThorSport Racing	Toyota	1

Stage 3 Laps: 55*

Fin.	St	#	Driver	Team	Make	Laps	Led	Status	Pts
1	30	25	Matt DiBenedetto	Rackley W.A.R.	Chevrolet	95	1	Running	40
2	15	99	Ben Rhodes	ThorSport Racing	Toyota	95	2	Running	46
3	23	32	Bret Holmes	Bret Holmes Racing	Chevrolet	95	7	Running	34
4	10	17	Ryan Preece	David Gilliland Racing	Ford	95	0	Running	33
5	13	98	Christian Eckes	ThorSport Racing	Toyota	95	25	Running	38
6	27	1	Hailie Deegan	David Gilliland Racing	Ford	95	0	Running	31
7	26	61	Chase Purdy	Hattori Racing Enterprises	Toyota	95	6	Running	30
8	7	91	Colby Howard	McAnally–Hilgemann Racing	Chevrolet	95	0	Running	34
9	21	75	Parker Kligerman	Henderson Motorsports	Chevrolet	95	0	Running	28
10	20	16	Tyler Ankrum	Hattori Racing Enterprises	Toyota	95	0	Running	33
11	36	30	Kaden Honeycutt	On Point Motorsports	Toyota	95	0	Running	26
12	25	84	Clay Greenfield	Cook Racing Technologies	Toyota	95	0	Running	25
13	8	19	Derek Kraus	McAnally–Hilgemann Racing	Chevrolet	95	3	Running	24
14	2	18	Chandler Smith	Kyle Busch Motorsports	Toyota	95	17	Running	40
15	33	56	Timmy Hill	Hill Motorsports	Toyota	95	0	Running	22
16	29	20	Parker Retzlaff (i)	Young's Motorsports	Chevrolet	95	0	Running	0
17	4	38	Zane Smith	Front Row Motorsports	Ford	95	1	Running	31
18	28	02	Kaz Grala	Young's Motorsports	Chevrolet	95	0	Running	19
19	14	24	Jack Wood (R)	GMS Racing	Chevrolet	95	0	Running	18
20	18	52	Stewart Friesen	Halmar Friesen Racing	Toyota	95	0	Running	25
21	32	44	Bayley Currey (i)	Niece Motorsports	Chevrolet	95	0	Running	0
22	5	88	Matt Crafton	ThorSport Racing	Toyota	95	1	Running	15
23	6	66	Ty Majeski	ThorSport Racing	Toyota	95	1	Running	15
24	1	4	John Hunter Nemechek	Kyle Busch Motorsports	Toyota	95	20	Running	32
25	19	13	Johnny Sauter	ThorSport Racing	Toyota	95	0	Running	12
26	12	51	Corey Heim (R)	Kyle Busch Motorsports	Toyota	94	0	Accident	17
27	24	9	Blaine Perkins (R)	CR7 Motorsports	Chevrolet	94	0	Accident	10
28	3	42	Carson Hocevar	Niece Motorsports	Chevrolet	94	12	Running	17
29	16	23	Grant Enfinger	GMS Racing	Chevrolet	94	0	Running	14
30	17	22	Austin Wayne Self	AM Racing	Chevrolet	78	0	Accident	7
31	11	15	Tanner Gray	David Gilliland Racing	Ford	78	0	Accident	12
32	31	10	Jennifer Jo Cobb	Jennifer Jo Cobb Racing	Chevrolet	73	0	Clutch	5
33	34	45	Lawless Alan (R)	Niece Motorsports	Chevrolet	32	0	Accident	4
34	35	40	Dean Thompson (R)	Niece Motorsports	Chevrolet	32	0	Accident	3
35	22	28	Bryan Dauzat	FDNY Racing	Chevrolet	32	0	DVP	2
36	9	3	Jordan Anderson	Jordan Anderson Racing	Chevrolet	18	0	Accident	1
Official race results

== Standings after the race ==
Drivers' Championship standings

	Pos	Driver	Points
	1	Chandler Smith	3,116
	2	Zane Smith	3,104 (-12)
5	3	Ben Rhodes	3,089 (-27)
2	4	Christian Eckes	3,086 (-30)
2	5	Stewart Friesen	3,086 (-30)
1	6	John Hunter Nemechek	3,084 (-32)
3	7	Ty Majeski	3,068 (-48)
1	8	Grant Enfinger	3,060 (-56)
	9	Matt Crafton	2,140 (-976)
	10	Carson Hocevar	2,134 (-982)
Official driver's standings

- Note: Only the first 10 positions are included for the driver standings.

Previous race: 2022 UNOH 200	NASCAR Camping World Truck Series; 2022 season	Next race: 2022 Baptist Health 200
