= 2021 Toyota Tundra 225 =

Race details
- Race 9 of 22 of the 2021 NASCAR Camping World Truck Series
- Date: May 22, 2021
- Official name: Toyota Tundra 225
- Location: Austin, Texas, Circuit of the Americas
- Course: Permanent racing facility
- Course length: 3.426 miles (5.513 km)
- Distance: 41 laps, 140.507 mi (226.115 km)
- Scheduled distance: 41 laps, 140.507 mi (226.115 km)
- Average speed: 70.790 miles per hour (113.925 km/h)

Pole position
Driver	Tyler Ankrum	GMS Racing
- Time: 2:43:591

Most laps led
Driver	Sheldon Creed	GMS Racing
- Laps: 19

Winner
No. 38	Todd Gilliland	Front Row Motorsports

Television in the United States
- Network: Fox Sports 1
- Announcers: Vince Welch, Michael Waltrip, and Andy Lally

Radio in the United States
- Radio: Motor Racing Network

The 2021 Toyota Tundra 225 was the 9th stock car race of the 2021 NASCAR Camping World Truck Series season, and the inaugural running of the event. The race was held on Saturday, May 22, 2021 in Austin, Texas at the Circuit of the Americas. The race took 41 laps to complete. At the end, Todd Gilliland of Front Row Motorsports would win the race, the second of his career and his first of the year. Kaz Grala of Young's Motorsports and Tyler Ankrum of GMS Racing would fill in the rest of the podium positions, finishing 2nd and 3rd respectively.

== Background ==
The layout of the Circuit of the Americas NASCAR used for the race.

Circuit of the Americas (COTA) is a grade 1 FIA-specification motorsports facility located within the extraterritorial jurisdiction of Austin, Texas. It features a 3.426-mile (5.514 km) road racing circuit. The facility is home to the Formula One United States Grand Prix, and the Motorcycle Grand Prix of the Americas, a round of the FIM Road Racing World Championship. It previously hosted the Supercars Championship, the FIA World Endurance Championship, the IMSA SportsCar Championship, and IndyCar Series.

On September 30, 2020, it was announced that COTA would host a NASCAR Cup Series event for the first time on May 23, 2021. The lower Xfinity and Camping World Truck Series were also added as support events. On December 11, 2020, it was announced that NASCAR would run the full 3.41 mile course.

=== Entry list ===
#	Driver	Team	Make
1	Hailie Deegan	David Gilliland Racing	Ford
2	Sheldon Creed	GMS Racing	Chevrolet
02	Kaz Grala	Young's Motorsports	Chevrolet
3	Roger Reuse	Jordan Anderson Racing	Chevrolet
4	John Hunter Nemechek	Kyle Busch Motorsports	Toyota
04	Cory Roper	Roper Racing	Ford
9	Grant Enfinger	CR7 Motorsports	Chevrolet
10	Jennifer Jo Cobb	Jennifer Jo Cobb Racing	Chevrolet
11	Camden Murphy	Spencer Davis Motorsports	Chevrolet
12	Tate Fogleman	Young's Motorsports	Chevrolet
13	Johnny Sauter	ThorSport Racing	Toyota
15	Tanner Gray	David Gilliland Racing	Ford
16	Austin Hill	Hattori Racing Enterprises	Toyota
18	Chandler Smith	Kyle Busch Motorsports	Toyota
19	Derek Kraus	McAnally–Hilgemann Racing	Toyota
20	Spencer Boyd	Young's Motorsports	Chevrolet
21	Zane Smith	GMS Racing	Chevrolet
22	Austin Wayne Self	AM Racing	Chevrolet
23	Chase Purdy	GMS Racing	Chevrolet
24	Jack Wood	GMS Racing	Chevrolet
25	Timothy Peters	Rackley W.A.R.	Chevrolet
26	Tyler Ankrum	GMS Racing	Chevrolet
30	Michele Abbate	On Point Motorsports	Toyota
32	Sam Mayer	Bret Holmes Racing	Chevrolet
33	Cameron Lawrence	Reaume Brothers Racing	Chevrolet
34	Lawless Alan	Reaume Brothers Racing	Toyota
38	Todd Gilliland	Front Row Motorsports	Ford
40	Ryan Truex	Niece Motorsports	Chevrolet
41	Dawson Cram	Cram Racing Enterprises	Chevrolet
42	Carson Hocevar	Niece Motorsports	Chevrolet
44	Logan Bearden	Niece Motorsports	Chevrolet
45	Bayley Currey	Niece Motorsports	Chevrolet
49	John Atwell	CMI Motorsports	Ford
51	Parker Chase	Kyle Busch Motorsports	Toyota
52	Stewart Friesen	Halmar Friesen Racing	Toyota
56	Timmy Hill	Hill Motorsports	Chevrolet
66	Paul Menard	ThorSport Racing	Toyota
72	Samuel LeComte	CMI Motorsports	Chevrolet
75	Parker Kligerman	Henderson Motorsports	Chevrolet
83	Brad Gross	CMI Motorsports	Chevrolet
88	Matt Crafton	ThorSport Racing	Toyota
98	Christian Eckes	ThorSport Racing	Toyota
99	Ben Rhodes	ThorSport Racing	Toyota
Official entry list

== Practice ==
The first and final practice took place on Friday, May 21 at 4:05 PM EST. Zane Smith of GMS Racing would win the pole with a 2:17.395 with an average speed of 89.348 miles per hour (143.792 km/h).

One incident would happen during practice: Brad Gross would spin with 26 minutes left in practice. Gross would receive damage from the spin and would not set a lap time.

Pos.	#	Driver	Team	Make	Time	Speed
1	21	Zane Smith	GMS Racing	Chevrolet	2:17.395	89.348
2	2	Sheldon Creed	GMS Racing	Chevrolet	2:17.735	89.128
3	9	Grant Enfinger	CR7 Motorsports	Chevrolet	2:18.472	88.653
Full final practice results

== Qualifying ==
Qualifying would take place under torrential downpour on Saturday, May 22 at 10:06 AM EST. Qualifying consisted of two rounds- the first round would be 25 minutes long, and everyone would have a chance to set a lap time. Then, the fastest 12 qualifiers would move on to the second round- a 10 minute round in which whoever set the fastest time in Round 2 won the pole. While Kaz Grala of Young's Motorsports would set the fastest time in Round 1, Tyler Ankrum would win the pole, beating Grala in Round 2 with a 2:40:401 with an average speed of 76.533 miles per hour (123.168 km/h).

Logan Bearden, Dawson Cram, Spencer Boyd, Samuel LeComte, John Atwell, Brad Gross, and Jennifer Jo Cobb would all fail to make the event.

There were numerous incidents in qualifying. First, Chase Purdy and Derek Kraus would crash into each other, sending Kraus spinning. Cobb would crash in qualifying in Turn 13, causing substantial damage to her vehicle. Samuel LeComte would spin after going wide exiting turn 20, hitting the curbs and spinning. Cory Roper would spin in Turn 11 after also going wide. Finally, Kraus was involved with another incident, this time with Roger Reuse.

Pos.	#	Driver	Team	Make	Time (R1)	Speed (R1)	Time (R2)	Speed (R2)
1	26	Tyler Ankrum	GMS Racing	Chevrolet	2:40.401	76.533	2:43.591	75.041
2	02	Kaz Grala	Young's Motorsports	Chevrolet	2:39.978	76.736	2:43.720	74.982
3	2	Sheldon Creed	GMS Racing	Chevrolet	2:41.745	75.897	2:44.176	74.773
4	88	Matt Crafton	ThorSport Racing	Toyota	2:41.917	75.817	2:44.210	74.758
5	38	Todd Gilliland	Front Row Motorsports	Ford	2:42.055	75.752	2:44.624	74.570
6	4	John Hunter Nemechek	Kyle Busch Motorsports	Toyota	2:40.738	76.373	2:44.969	74.414
7	33	Cameron Lawrence	Reaume Brothers Racing	Chevrolet	2:42.827	75.393	2:45.517	74.168
8	51	Parker Chase	Kyle Busch Motorsports	Toyota	2:42.469	75.559	2:45.870	74.010
9	16	Austin Hill	Hattori Racing Enterprises	Toyota	2:42.709	75.448	2:46.869	73.567
10	98	Christian Eckes	ThorSport Racing	Toyota	2:42.763	75.423	2:47.808	73.155
11	99	Ben Rhodes	ThorSport Racing	Toyota	2:42:417	75.583	2:48.615	72.805
12	40	Ryan Truex	Niece Motorsports	Chevrolet	2:42.589	75.503	0.000	0.000
Eliminated in Round 1
13	75	Parker Kligerman	Henderson Motorsports	Chevrolet	2:42.950	75.336	0.000	0.000
14	45	Bayley Currey	Niece Motorsports	Chevrolet	2:43.215	75.214	0.000	0.000
15	21	Zane Smith	GMS Racing	Chevrolet	2:43.220	75.211	0.000	0.000
16	52	Stewart Friesen	Halmar Friesen Racing	Toyota	2:43.318	75.166	0.000	0.000
17	42	Carson Hocevar	Niece Motorsports	Chevrolet	2:43.470	75.096	0.000	0.000
18	25	Timothy Peters	Rackley W.A.R.	Chevrolet	2:43.590	75.041	0.000	0.000
19	19	Derek Kraus	McAnally–Hilgemann Racing	Toyota	2:43.597	75.038	0.000	0.000
20	18	Chandler Smith	Kyle Busch Motorsports	Toyota	2:44.098	74.809	0.000	0.000
21	32	Sam Mayer	Bret Holmes Racing	Chevrolet	2:44.126	74.796	0.000	0.000
22	56	Timmy Hill	Hill Motorsports	Chevrolet	2:44.153	74.784	0.000	0.000
23	9	Grant Enfinger	CR7 Motorsports	Chevrolet	2:44.272	74.730	0.000	0.000
24	11	Camden Murphy	Spencer Davis Motorsports	Chevrolet	2:44.327	74.705	0.000	0.000
25	30	Michele Abbate	On Point Motorsports	Toyota	2:44.811	74.485	0.000	0.000
26	66	Paul Menard	ThorSport Racing	Toyota	2:44.978	74.410	0.000	0.000
27	13	Johnny Sauter	ThorSport Racing	Toyota	2:45.069	74.369	0.000	0.000
28	1	Hailie Deegan	David Gilliland Racing	Ford	2:45.114	74.349	0.000	0.000
29	22	Austin Wayne Self	AM Racing	Chevrolet	2:45.322	74.255	0.000	0.000
30	12	Tate Fogleman	Young's Motorsports	Chevrolet	2:45.690	74.090	0.000	0.000
31	23	Chase Purdy	GMS Racing	Chevrolet	2:45.867	74.011	0.000	0.000
Qualified by owner's points
32	34	Lawless Alan	Reaume Brothers Racing	Toyota	2:47.447	73.313	0.000	0.000
33	24	Jack Wood	GMS Racing	Chevrolet	2:47.998	73.072	0.000	0.000
34	04	Cory Roper	Roper Racing	Ford	2:49.825	72.286	0.000	0.000
35	3	Roger Reuse	Jordan Anderson Racing	Chevrolet	2:54.909	70.185	0.000	0.000
36	15	Tanner Gray	David Gilliland Racing	Ford	0.000	0.000	0.000	0.000
Failed to qualify								
37	44	Logan Bearden	Niece Motorsports	Chevrolet	2:46.121	73.898	0.000	0.000
38	41	Dawson Cram	Cram Racing Enterprises	Chevrolet	2:46.478	73.739	0.000	0.000
39	20	Spencer Boyd	Young's Motorsports	Chevrolet	2:46.611	73.681	0.000	0.000
40	72	Samuel Lecomte	CMI Motorsports	Chevrolet	2:53.122	70.910	0.000	0.000
41	49	John Atwell	CMI Motorsports	Ford	2:54.396	70.392	0.000	0.000
42	83	Brad Gross	CMI Motorsports	Chevrolet	3:03.193	67.011	0.000	0.000
43	10	Jennifer Jo Cobb	Jennifer Jo Cobb Racing	Chevrolet	3:06.406	65.856	0.000	0.000
Official first and second round results
Official starting lineup

== Race results ==
Stage 1 Laps: 12

Fin	#	Driver	Team	Make	Pts
1	38	Todd Gilliland	Front Row Motorsports	Ford	10
2	02	Kaz Grala	Young's Motorsports	Chevrolet	9
3	26	Tyler Ankrum	GMS Racing	Chevrolet	8
4	88	Matt Crafton	ThorSport Racing	Toyota	7
5	99	Ben Rhodes	ThorSport Racing	Toyota	6
6	32	Sam Mayer	Bret Holmes Racing	Chevrolet	5
7	52	Stewart Friesen	Halmar Friesen Racing	Toyota	4
8	4	John Hunter Nemechek	Kyle Busch Motorsports	Toyota	3
9	2	Sheldon Creed	GMS Racing	Chevrolet	2
10	56	Timmy Hill	Hill Motorsports	Chevrolet	1

Stage 2 Laps: 14

Fin	#	Driver	Team	Make	Pts
1	99	Ben Rhodes	ThorSport Racing	Toyota	10
2	88	Matt Crafton	ThorSport Racing	Toyota	9
3	19	Derek Kraus	McAnally–Hilgemann Racing	Toyota	8
4	2	Sheldon Creed	GMS Racing	Chevrolet	7
5	26	Tyler Ankrum	GMS Racing	Chevrolet	6
6	02	Kaz Grala	Young's Motorsports	Chevrolet	5
7	45	Bayley Currey	Niece Motorsports	Chevrolet	4
8	32	Sam Mayer	Bret Holmes Racing	Chevrolet	3
9	38	Todd Gilliland	Front Row Motorsports	Ford	2
10	11	Camden Murphy	Spencer Davis Motorsports	Chevrolet	1

Stage 3 Laps: 15

Fin	St	#	Driver	Team	Make	Laps	Led	Status	Pts
1	5	38	Todd Gilliland	Front Row Motorsports	Ford	41	8	running	52
2	2	02	Kaz Grala	Young's Motorsports	Chevrolet	41	11	running	49
3	1	26	Tyler Ankrum	GMS Racing	Chevrolet	41	4	running	48
4	23	9	Grant Enfinger	CR7 Motorsports	Chevrolet	41	0	running	33
5	3	2	Sheldon Creed	GMS Racing	Chevrolet	41	14	running	41
6	21	32	Sam Mayer	Bret Holmes Racing	Chevrolet	41	0	running	39
7	17	42	Carson Hocevar	Niece Motorsports	Chevrolet	41	0	running	30
8	15	21	Zane Smith	GMS Racing	Chevrolet	41	0	running	29
9	9	16	Austin Hill	Hattori Racing Enterprises	Toyota	41	0	running	28
10	11	99	Ben Rhodes	ThorSport Racing	Toyota	41	3	running	43
11	26	66	Paul Menard	ThorSport Racing	Toyota	41	0	running	26
12	6	4	John Hunter Nemechek	Kyle Busch Motorsports	Toyota	41	0	running	28
13	13	75	Parker Kligerman	Henderson Motorsports	Chevrolet	41	0	running	24
14	28	1	Hailie Deegan	David Gilliland Racing	Ford	41	0	running	23
15	4	88	Matt Crafton	ThorSport Racing	Toyota	41	1	running	38
16	29	22	Austin Wayne Self	AM Racing	Chevrolet	41	0	running	21
17	16	52	Stewart Friesen	Halmar Friesen Racing	Toyota	41	0	running	24
18	8	51	Parker Chase	Kyle Busch Motorsports	Toyota	41	0	running	19
19	24	11	Camden Murphy	Spencer Davis Motorsports	Chevrolet	41	0	running	19
20	12	40	Ryan Truex	Niece Motorsports	Chevrolet	41	0	running	17
21	19	19	Derek Kraus	McAnally–Hilgemann Racing	Toyota	41	0	running	24
22	27	13	Johnny Sauter	ThorSport Racing	Toyota	41	0	running	15
23	32	34	Lawless Alan	Reaume Brothers Racing	Toyota	41	0	running	14
24	22	56	Timmy Hill	Hill Motorsports	Chevrolet	41	0	running	14
25	30	12	Tate Fogleman	Young's Motorsports	Chevrolet	41	0	running	12
26	14	45	Bayley Currey	Niece Motorsports	Chevrolet	41	0	running	15
27	31	23	Chase Purdy	GMS Racing	Chevrolet	41	0	running	10
28	33	24	Jack Wood	GMS Racing	Chevrolet	41	0	running	9
29	25	30	Michele Abbate	On Point Motorsports	Toyota	41	0	running	8
30	34	04	Cory Roper	Roper Racing	Ford	41	0	running	7
31	36	15	Tanner Gray	David Gilliland Racing	Ford	40	0	running	6
32	18	25	Timothy Peters	Rackley W.A.R.	Chevrolet	40	0	running	5
33	20	18	Chandler Smith	Kyle Busch Motorsports	Toyota	39	0	running	4
34	35	3	Roger Reuse	Jordan Anderson Racing	Chevrolet	38	0	running	3
35	10	98	Christian Eckes	ThorSport Racing	Toyota	36	0	suspension	2
36	7	33	Cameron Lawrence	Reaume Brothers Racing	Chevrolet	34	0	running	1
Official race results

Previous race: 2021 LiftKits4Less.com 200	NASCAR Camping World Truck Series; 2021 season	Next race: 2021 North Carolina Education Lottery 200
