= On Point Motorsports =

American stock car racing team

- Owner(s): Steven Lane; James Whitener
- Base: Denver, North Carolina
- Series: NASCAR Craftsman Truck Series
- Race drivers: 30. Chris Hacker, Ryan Vargas, Colin Garrett, Tanner Carrick, Jonathan Shafer, Brad Perez (part-time)
- Manufacturer: Toyota
- Opened: 2018
- Closed: 2024

Career
- Debut: Truck Series: 2018 UNOH 200 (Bristol); ARCA Racing Series: 2019 Lucas Oil 200 (Daytona)
- Latest race: ARCA Racing Series: 2019 Lucas Oil 200 (Daytona)
- Races competed: Total: 107; Truck Series: 103; ARCA Racing Series: 1 NASCAR Whelen All-American Series: 3
- Drivers' Championships: Total: 0 Truck Series: 0 ARCA Racing Series: 0 NASCAR Whelen All-American Series: 0
- Race victories: Total: 0 Truck Series: 0 ARCA Racing Series: 0 NASCAR Whelen All-American Series: 0
- Pole positions: Total: 0 Truck Series: 0 ARCA Racing Series: 0 NASCAR Whelen All-American Series: 0

On Point Motorsports was an American professional stock car racing team that fielded the No. 30 Toyota Tundra part-time in the NASCAR Craftsman Truck Series for multiple drivers.

== History ==
On July 11, 2018, former JGL Racing crew chief Steven Lane and a group of investors formed the team. The team announced that they would attempt to make their debut on August 16 at Bristol.

== Xfinity Series ==
With the formation of their team on July 11, 2018, they announced plans to compete in the NASCAR Xfinity Series “soon”, although these plans never came to fruition and the team has not attempted to run in the Xfinity Series since then and in addition to that their stock of NXS chassis were sold off to MBM Motorsports in 2019.

== Truck Series ==
In July 2018, Steven Lane and a group of investors along with James Whitener, Sr. who followed Lane from JGL Racing, formed the team and its No. 30 truck.

=== Truck No. 30 history ===
==== 2018 ====
The team made its Truck Series debut at Bristol with Scott Lagasse Jr. driving. Lagasse qualified for the race on time qualifying 22nd and finishing 31st after crashing early in the race. The team announced that Austin Theriault would drive the Las Vegas fall race. Theriault started the race 21st and finished 8th after avoiding multiple wrecks near the end of the race. For the Talladega race, the team announced that Lagasse was back on the team. Lagasse finished 18th. On October 22, 2018, the team announced that Jeb Burton would drive the truck at Martinsville, with Strutmasters.com being the sponsor, He finished 15th. The team and Burton returned for the season finale at Homestead where they qualified 21st and finished 18th.

==== 2019 ====
On January 28, 2019, the team announced Brennan Poole would drive for the team full-time. At Daytona they qualified 26th and finished 24th after being involved in The Big One while running 9th. For Atlanta and Las Vegas they received sponsorship from conservative website keepandbear.com stirring up a bit of controversy, however, they still finished 13th and 20th respectively. At Martinsville the team would receive sponsorship from Bad Boy Mowers once again where they qualified 28th and finish 29th after a plug wire failure in numerous Ilmor Engines that day. For Texas they went unsponsored till raceday when Bad Boy Mowers again stepped in, they qualified 13th and finished 9th. At Dover they qualified 8th but were forced into the wall on lap 1 and ended up finishing the race in 23rd, 10 laps down. On May 8, 2019, On Point Motorsports announced they would withdraw from Kansas after financial issues, but they would enter at Charlotte.

On May 17, 2019, they returned at Charlotte, where they had a strong truck all day leading final practice and would qualify 17th, however, the team recorded their best finish ever with a second-place finish with Poole coming up one spot short to Kyle Busch.

At Texas, Poole scored another top ten finish while also scoring stage points in Stage 2 with a 7th-place finish and 6th place Stage 2 finish after starting 18th. They followed it up at Iowa with an 11th-place finish after qualifying 15th. At Gateway they entered but later withdrew, then did not enter at all the next week at Chicagoland. They returned at Kentucky where they qualified 10th and despite running top 5 all night, finishing 15th two laps down after Ben Rhodes came up the racetrack and wrecked himself and Poole. That wreck was later met with Rhodes attempting to fight Poole but he was pulled away before he could ever get to Poole. They returned at Bristol with Brennan Poole with backing from Bad Boy Mowers and Inspectra Thermal Solutions where they qualified 9th and finish 19th after getting wrecked by Natalie Decker and Gus Dean while running 12th with inside 10 to go. On September 12, 2019, Poole and On Point announced they would return at Las Vegas with sponsorship from Goettl Air Conditioning, they qualified 18th and finished 6th after a solid run all night. The team returned to the site of what was nearly Poole's first career NASCAR Xfinity Series win at Talladega Superspeedway, the team ran around 11th all day but blew a tire while running 4th with 21 to go and finish 26th.

On August 7, 2019, On Point announced that Danny Bohn would make his Truck Series debut at Martinsville. Despite running right around 20th all day the team made perfect on a strategy call to stay out on fuel and avoided multiple wrecks to finish a strong eighth, at ISM, the team struggled all race and finished 27th, six laps down after a mid-race spin.

==== 2020 ====
Poole and Bohn returned to the No. 30 in 2020, with Poole running the first half of the season and Bohn running the second half of the season. Scott Lagasse Jr. also ran one race in the No. 30 at the Daytona Road Course. The team entered all races except for Dover in August.

==== 2021 ====
On January 28, 2021, OPM announced that Bohn would be back with them in 2021 in the No. 30. The team retained his 2020 sponsor, North American Motor Car, for at least the season-opener at Daytona. The team stated that a full season was possible if additional sponsorship could be found. Bohn proceeded to run the entire season with only excluding COTA, which was run by Trans-Am female Michele Abbate, and Texas, which was run by Brennan Poole.

==== 2022 ====
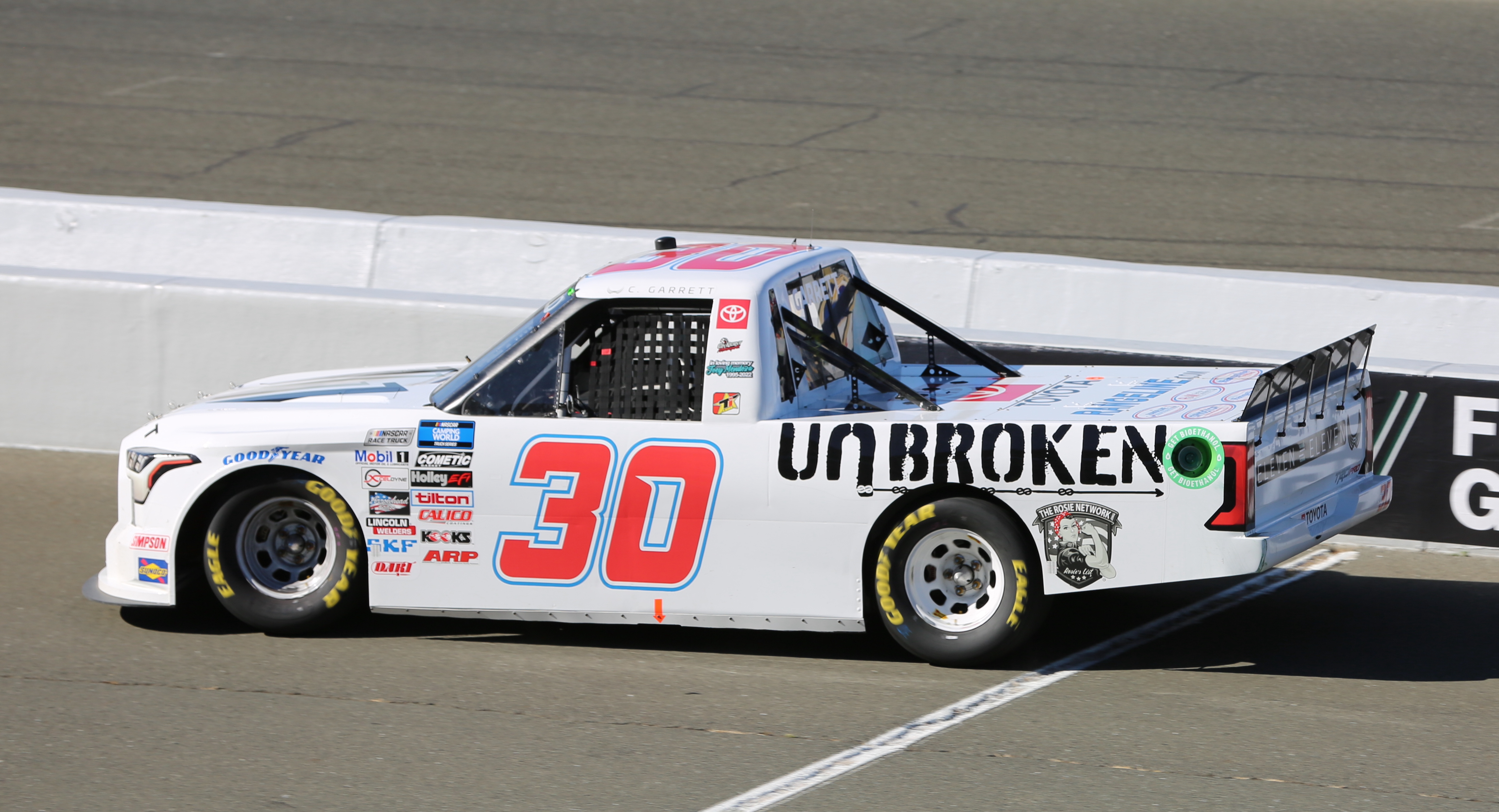
Josh Bilicki in the No. 30 at Sonoma Raceway in 2022

On November 30, 2021, it was announced that Tate Fogleman would race full-time in the No. 30 Toyota Tundra full-time. Fogleman left the team after Gateway. Colin Garrett was scheduled to drive the No. 30 truck at Sonoma. However, due to the late notice of this opportunity, Garrett was unable to receive his drug test back in time to be able to compete. Josh Bilicki filled in starting P26 and finishing P30 due to a crash. Joey Gase drove the truck at Knoxville. Camden Murphy drove the No. 30 truck at Nashville. On July, Kaden Honeycutt Honeycutt had signed a three race deal to drive the No. 30 truck for the team in the races at Pocono, Richmond, and Kansas races. Honeycutt's breakthrough moment would be at Bristol, in which he finished in the top-15. Chris Hacker would drive the No. 30 truck in the TSport 200 at Lucas Oil Indianapolis Raceway Park.

==== 2024 ====
In January 2024, The No. 30 truck owner points were bought by Reaume Brothers Racing.

==== Truck No. 30 results ====
Year	Driver	No.	Make	1	2	3	4	5	6	7	8	9	10	11	12	13	14	15	16	17	18	19	20	21	22	23	Owners	Pts
2018	Scott Lagasse Jr.	30	Toyota	DAY	ATL	LVS	MAR	DOV	KAN	CLT	TEX	IOW	GTW	CHI	KEN	ELD	POC	MCH	BRI; 31	MSP		TAL; 18					37th	95
2018	Austin Theriault	30	Toyota																		LVS; 8						37th	95
2018	Jeb Burton	30	Toyota																				MAR; 15	TEX	PHO	HOM; 18	37th	95
2019	Brennan Poole	30	Toyota	DAY; 24	ATL; 13	LVS; 20	MAR; 29	TEX; 9	DOV; 23	KAN	CLT; 2	TEX; 7	IOW; 11	GTW	CHI	KEN; 15	POC	ELD	MCH	BRI; 19	MSP	LVS; 6	TAL; 26				22nd	216
2019	Danny Bohn	30	Toyota																					MAR; 8	PHO; 27	HOM; 25	22nd	216
2020	Brennan Poole	30	Toyota	DAY; 17	LVS; 15	CLT; 38	ATL; 17	HOM; 19	POC; 35	KEN; 17	TEX; 31	KAN; 12	KAN; 12	MCH; 35													22nd	354
2020	Scott Lagasse Jr.	30	Toyota												DAY; 9	DOV											22nd	354
2020	Danny Bohn	30	Toyota														GTW; 16	DAR; 20	RCH; 33	BRI; 24	LVS; 25	TAL; 34	KAN; 21	TEX; 17	MAR; 7	PHO; 26	22nd	354
2021	Danny Bohn	30	Toyota	DAY; 17	DAY; 30	LVS; 17	ATL; 28	BRI; 36	RCH; 20	KAN; 26	DAR; 18		CLT; 24		NSH; 30	POC; 38	KNX; 10	GLN; 28	GTW; 36	DAR; 20	BRI; 33	LVS; 18	TAL; 8	MAR; 14	PHO; 28		26th	306
2021	Michele Abbate	30	Toyota									COA; 29															26th	306
2021	Brennan Poole	30	Toyota											TEX; 14													26th	306
2022	Tate Fogleman	30	Toyota	DAY; 22	LVS; 12	ATL; 31	COA; 18	MAR; 22	BRI; 28	DAR; 31	KAN; 20	TEX; 22	CLT; 29	GTW; 21													24th	317
2022	Josh Bilicki	30	Toyota												SON; 30												24th	317
2022	Joey Gase	30	Toyota													KNX; 24											24th	317
2022	Camden Murphy	30	Toyota														NSH; 34	MOH									24th	317
2022	Kaden Honeycutt	30	Toyota																POC; 25		RCH; 21	KAN; 24	BRI; 13	TAL; 11	HOM; 27	PHO; 9	24th	317
2022	Chris Hacker	30	Toyota																	IRP; 24							24th	317
2023	Chris Hacker	30	Toyota	DAY; 25	LVS								NWS; 12		GTW; Wth					IRP; 29						PHO; 36	31st	222
2023	Ryan Vargas	30	Toyota			ATL; 14		TEX; 8				DAR; 27		CLT; 26			MOH; 23	POC	RCH; 30					TAL; 17			31st	222
2023	Colin Garrett	30	Toyota				COA; 20																				31st	222
2023	Tanner Carrick	30	Toyota						BRD; 26																		31st	222
2023	Jonathan Shafer	30	Toyota							MAR; 29	KAN					NSH; 24									HOM; 26		31st	222
2023	Brad Perez	30	Toyota																		MLW; 35	KAN	BRI				31st	222

^{*} Season still in progress

=== Truck No. 31 history ===
For the 2021 race at Gateway, the team entered a 2nd truck for Chris Hacker, attempting to make his debut. As a result of having 42 trucks on the entry list, and qualifying not being held as part of Covid procedure, the entry did not have any owner's points and DNQed without making it to the track. Hacker would move over to the Reaume Brothers Racing No. 34 for the race.

==== Truck No. 31 results ====
Year	Driver	No.	Make	1	2	3	4	5	6	7	8	9	10	11	12	13	14	15	16	17	18	19	20	21	22	Owners	Pts
2021	Chris Hacker	31	Toyota	DAY	DRC	LVS	ATL	BRD	RCH	KAN	DAR	COA	CLT	TEX	NSH	POC	KNX	GLN	GTW; DNQ	DAR	BRI	LVS	TAL	MAR	PHO	N/A	0

== ARCA Menards Series ==
In November 2018 On Point announced they would expand to the ARCA Racing Series for the 2019 season on a part-time basis.

=== Car No. 29 history ===
On January 4, 2019, On Point announced they would enter a car into the Daytona test session in January with Derrick Lancaster. They would end up placing 7th on the speed charts, and soon after, Lancaster was announced to be their driver for the ARCA season opener at Daytona. He would qualify 26th and finish 17th.

==== Car No. 29 results ====
Year	Team	No.	Make	1	2	3	4	5	6	7	8	9	10	11	12	13	14	15	16	17	18	19	20	AMSC	Pts
2019	Derrick Lancaster	29	Toyota	DAY; 17	FIF	SLM	TAL	NSH	TOL	CLT	POC	MCH	MAD	GTW	CHI	ELK	IOW	POC	ISF	DSF	SLM	IRP	KAN	73rd	125

^{*} Season still in progress
