= 2019 Sioux Chief PowerPEX 200 =

6th race of the 2019 ARCA Menards Series

Race details
- Race 6 of 20 of the 2019 ARCA Menards Series
- Date: May 19, 2019
- Official name: 23rd Annual Sioux Chief PowerPEX 200
- Location: Toledo Speedway, Toledo, Ohio
- Course: Permanent racing facility
- Course length: 0.804 km (0.5 miles)
- Distance: 152 laps, 76 mi (122 km)
- Scheduled distance: 200 laps, 100 mi (161 km)
- Average speed: 76.811 mph (123.615 km/h)

Pole position
Driver	Michael Self	Venturini Motorsports
- Time: 15.777

Most laps led
Driver	Chandler Smith	Venturini Motorsports
- Laps: 140

Winner
No. 20	Chandler Smith	Venturini Motorsports

Television in the United States
- Network: MAVTV
- Announcers: Bob Dillner and Jim Tretow

Radio in the United States
- Radio: ARCA Racing Network

The 2019 Sioux Chief PowerPEX 200 was the sixth stock car race of the 2019 ARCA Menards Series season, and the 23rd iteration of the event. The race was held on Sunday, May 19, 2019, in Toledo, Ohio, at Toledo Speedway, a 0.5 mile (0.804 km) permanent oval shaped racetrack. The race was originally scheduled to be contested over 200 laps, but was decreased to 152 laps, due to inclement weather. Chandler Smith, driving for Venturini Motorsports, would put on a blistering performance, leading a race-high 140 laps and earning his third career ARCA Menards Series win, and his first of the season. To fill out the podium, Ty Gibbs, driving for Joe Gibbs Racing, and Christian Eckes, driving for Venturini Motorsports, would finish 2nd and 3rd, respectively.

== Background ==
Toledo Speedway is a half-mile paved oval racetrack located in Toledo, Ohio, United States. It is owned jointly by Roy Mott and ARCA President Ron Drager. It is operated by ARCA and run as the sister track to Flat Rock Speedway in Flat Rock, Michigan.

=== Entry list ===
- (R) denotes rookie driver.

#	Driver	Team	Make	Sponsor
1	Dick Doheny	Fast Track Racing	Chevrolet	Fast Track Racing
03	Alex Clubb	Clubb Racing Inc.	Ford	A. Clubb Lawn Care
06	Tim Richmond (R)	Wayne Peterson Racing	Dodge	GreatRailing.com
10	Tommy Vigh Jr. (R)	Fast Track Racing	Ford	Extreme Kleaner
11	Rick Clifton	Fast Track Racing	Ford	Ashville Propane, Ohio Ag Equipment
15	Christian Eckes (R)	Venturini Motorsports	Toyota	JBL
18	Ty Gibbs	Joe Gibbs Racing	Toyota	Monster Energy, Terrible Herbst
20	Chandler Smith	Venturini Motorsports	Toyota	Craftsman
21	Sam Mayer	GMS Racing	Chevrolet	Chevrolet Accessories
22	Corey Heim (R)	Chad Bryant Racing	Ford	Speedway Children's Charities
23	Bret Holmes	Bret Holmes Racing	Chevrolet	Holmes II Excavation
25	Michael Self	Venturini Motorsports	Toyota	Sinclair Oil Corporation
27	Travis Braden	RFMS Racing	Ford	MatrixCare, Consonus Healthcare
28	Carson Hocevar (R)	KBR Development	Chevrolet	Scott's, GM Parts Now
54	Tanner Gray	DGR-Crosley	Toyota	Gray Motorsports, Valvoline, Durst
55	Hailie Deegan	Venturini Motorsports	Toyota	TRD 40th Anniversary
69	Mike Basham	Kimmel Racing	Ford	Kimmel Racing
77	Joe Graf Jr.	Chad Bryant Racing	Ford	Eat Sleep Race
Official entry list

== Practice ==
The first and only practice session was held on Saturday, May 18, at 12:30 PM EST, and would last for 90 minutes. Chandler Smith, driving for Venturini Motorsports, would set the fastest time in the session, with a lap of 15.811, and an average speed of 113.845 mph (183.216 km/h).

Pos.	#	Driver	Team	Make	Time	Speed
1	20	Chandler Smith	Venturini Motorsports	Toyota	15.811	113.845
2	18	Ty Gibbs	Joe Gibbs Racing	Toyota	15.820	113.780
3	15	Christian Eckes (R)	Venturini Motorsports	Toyota	15.929	113.001
Full practice results

== Qualifying ==
Qualifying was held on Saturday, May 18, at 4:00 PM EST. The qualifying system used is a single-car, two-lap system with only one round. Whoever sets the fastest time in that round will win the pole. Michael Self, driving for Venturini Motorsports, would score the pole for the race, with a lap of 15.777, and an average speed of 114.090 mph (183.610 km/h).

Pos.	#	Driver	Team	Make	Time	Speed
1	25	Michael Self	Venturini Motorsports	Toyota	15.777	114.090
2	20	Chandler Smith	Venturini Motorsports	Toyota	15.781	114.061
3	15	Christian Eckes (R)	Venturini Motorsports	Toyota	15.826	113.737
4	18	Ty Gibbs	Joe Gibbs Racing	Toyota	15.854	113.536
5	23	Bret Holmes	Bret Holmes Racing	Chevrolet	15.873	113.400
6	22	Corey Heim (R)	Chad Bryant Racing	Ford	15.900	113.208
7	28	Carson Hocevar (R)	KBR Development	Chevrolet	15.971	112.704
8	27	Travis Braden	RFMS Racing	Ford	15.972	112.697
9	21	Sam Mayer	GMS Racing	Chevrolet	15.995	112.535
10	54	Tanner Gray	DGR-Crosley	Toyota	16.047	112.170
11	77	Joe Graf Jr.	Chad Bryant Racing	Ford	16.051	112.143
12	55	Hailie Deegan	Venturini Motorsports	Toyota	16.055	112.115
13	03	Alex Clubb	Clubb Racing Inc.	Ford	17.498	102.869
14	10	Tommy Vigh Jr. (R)	Fast Track Racing	Ford	17.685	101.781
15	1	Dick Doheny	Fast Track Racing	Chevrolet	17.977	100.128
16	69	Mike Basham	Kimmel Racing	Ford	18.137	99.245
17	06	Tim Richmond (R)	Wayne Peterson Racing	Dodge	18.216	98.814
18	11	Rick Clifton	Fast Track Racing	Ford	18.479	97.408
Official qualifying results

== Race results ==
Fin	St	#	Driver	Team	Make	Laps	Led	Status	Pts
1	2	20	Chandler Smith	Venturini Motorsports	Toyota	152	140	Running	245
2	4	18	Ty Gibbs	Joe Gibbs Racing	Toyota	152	0	Running	220
3	3	15	Christian Eckes (R)	Venturini Motorsports	Toyota	152	0	Running	215
4	1	25	Michael Self	Venturini Motorsports	Toyota	152	12	Running	220
5	9	21	Sam Mayer	GMS Racing	Chevrolet	152	0	Running	205
6	7	28	Carson Hocevar (R)	KBR Development	Chevrolet	152	0	Running	200
7	5	23	Bret Holmes	Bret Holmes Racing	Chevrolet	152	0	Running	195
8	10	54	Tanner Gray	DGR-Crosley	Toyota	152	0	Running	190
9	13	10	Tommy Vigh Jr. (R)	Fast Track Racing	Ford	150	0	Running	185
10	6	22	Corey Heim (R)	Chad Bryant Racing	Ford	146	0	Running	180
11	17	06	Tim Richmond (R)	Wayne Peterson Racing	Dodge	139	0	Running	175
12	14	03	Alex Clubb	Clubb Racing Inc.	Ford	95	0	Radiator	170
13	8	27	Travis Braden	RFMS Racing	Ford	77	0	Accident	165
14	18	11	Rick Clifton	Fast Track Racing	Ford	47	0	Brakes	160
15	15	1	Dick Doheny	Fast Track Racing	Chevrolet	38	0	Overheating	155
16	16	69	Mike Basham	Kimmel Racing	Ford	34	0	Suspension	150
17	11	77	Joe Graf Jr.	Chad Bryant Racing	Ford	29	0	Accident	145
18	12	55	Hailie Deegan	Venturini Motorsports	Toyota	29	0	Accident	140
Official race results

Previous race: 2019 Music City 200	ARCA Menards Series; 2019 season	Next race: 2019 General Tire 150
