= 2021 LiftKits4Less.com 200 =

Race details
- Race 8 of 22 of the 2021 NASCAR Camping World Truck Series
- Date: May 7, 2021
- Official name: LiftKits4Less.com 200
- Location: Darlington, South Carolina, Darlington Raceway
- Course: Permanent racing facility
- Course length: 1.366 miles (2.198 km)
- Distance: 147 laps, 200.802 mi (323.106 km)
- Scheduled distance: 147 laps, 200.802 mi (323.106 km)
- Average speed: 81.041 miles per hour (130.423 km/h)

Pole position
Driver	John Hunter Nemechek	Kyle Busch Motorsports

Most laps led
Driver	John Hunter Nemechek	Kyle Busch Motorsports
- Laps: 65

Winner
No. 2	Sheldon Creed	GMS Racing

Television in the United States
- Network: Fox Sports 1
- Announcers: Vince Welch and Michael Waltrip

Radio in the United States
- Radio: Motor Racing Network

The 2021 LiftKits4Less.com 200 was the 8th stock car race of the 2021 NASCAR Camping World Truck Series season and the 8th iteration of the event. The race was brought back to the schedule as a permanent addition after fan interest, and the race was made the official throwback race for the Truck Series. The race was held on May 7, 2021 in Darlington, South Carolina at Darlington Raceway, a 1.366 miles (2.198 km) egg-shaped oval permanent racetrack. The race took 147 laps to complete. After a massive crash near the end of the race took out almost all of the field, Sheldon Creed of GMS Racing would win the race, garnering his 6th win of his career and his first of the season. Ben Rhodes of ThorSport Racing and Carson Hocevar of Niece Motorsports would finish the podium, finishing 2nd and 3rd, respectively. The average speed was the slowest in any Darlington Raceway event since the 1952 Southern 500.

== Background ==
The layout of Darlington Raceway, the venue where the race was held.

Darlington Raceway is a race track built for NASCAR racing located near Darlington, South Carolina. It is nicknamed "The Lady in Black" and "The Track Too Tough to Tame" by many NASCAR fans and drivers and advertised as "A NASCAR Tradition." It is of a unique, somewhat egg-shaped design, an oval with the ends of very different configurations, a condition which supposedly arose from the proximity of one end of the track to a minnow pond the owner refused to relocate. This situation makes it very challenging for the crews to set up their cars' handling in a way that is effective at both ends.

=== Entry list ===
#	Driver	Team	Make	Throwback (if applicable)
1	Hailie Deegan	David Gilliland Racing	Ford	1966 24 Hours of Daytona Ford GT win
2	Sheldon Creed	GMS Racing	Chevrolet	Jason Leffler 2002 Truck scheme
02	Kris Wright	Young's Motorsports	Chevrolet	Ron Hornaday Jr. 2005 Goodwrench Trucks scheme
3	Jordan Anderson	Jordan Anderson Racing	Chevrolet	Mark Martin & Larry McReynolds 1982 Apache Stove Cup scheme
4	John Hunter Nemechek	Kyle Busch Motorsports	Toyota	
04	Cory Roper	Roper Racing	Ford	Bobby Hamilton 2005 Trucks scheme
6	Norm Benning	Norm Benning Racing	Chevrolet	
9	Codie Rohrbaugh	CR7 Motorsports	Chevrolet	
10	Jennifer Jo Cobb	Jennifer Jo Cobb Racing	Chevrolet	
11	Spencer Davis	Spencer Davis Motorsports	Toyota	Darrell Waltrip's 2004 Toyota Tundra Trucks scheme
12	Tate Fogleman	Young's Motorsports	Chevrolet	Jay Fogleman tribute
13	Johnny Sauter	ThorSport Racing	Toyota	
14	Trey Hutchens	Trey Hutchens Racing	Chevrolet	
15	Tanner Gray	David Gilliland Racing	Ford	
16	Austin Hill	Hattori Racing Enterprises	Toyota	Mike Stefanik Late Model scheme
17	David Gilliland	David Gilliland Racing	Ford	
18	Chandler Smith	Kyle Busch Motorsports	Toyota	Pre-2013 Safelite MobileGlassShop vehicles
19	Derek Kraus	McAnally–Hilgemann Racing	Toyota	Michael Waltrip 2003 Daytona 500 victory scheme
20	Spencer Boyd	Young's Motorsports	Chevrolet	Jack Sprague 2007 Conway Trucks scheme
21	Zane Smith	GMS Racing	Chevrolet	Glen Wood's 1957 scheme
22	Austin Wayne Self	AM Racing	Chevrolet	Tony Raines's 1997-98 Pennzoil Trucks scheme
23	Chase Purdy	GMS Racing	Chevrolet	Davey Allison 1981 scheme
24	Ryan Reed	GMS Racing	Chevrolet	
25	Timothy Peters	Rackley W.A.R.	Chevrolet	Bobby Hamilton 2004 Trucks scheme
26	Tyler Ankrum	GMS Racing	Chevrolet	Ricky Bobby Wonder Bread scheme from Talladega Nights: The Ballad of Ricky Bobby
30	Danny Bohn	On Point Motorsports	Toyota	Michael Waltrip 1989-1990 Country Time scheme
33	B. J. McLeod	Reaume Brothers Racing	Chevrolet	Camping World throwback
34	Akinori Ogata	Reaume Brothers Racing	Toyota	Kenji Momota 1995 Trucks scheme
38	Todd Gilliland	Front Row Motorsports	Ford	Charles Powell III 1998 scheme
40	Ryan Truex	Niece Motorsports	Chevrolet	Marquis Hot Tubs classic logo
41	Dawson Cram	Cram Racing Enterprises	Chevrolet	Tim Flock 1952 scheme
42	Carson Hocevar	Niece Motorsports	Chevrolet	Johnny Benson Jr. 2002 Pop Secret Microwave Popcorn 400 win scheme
44	Bayley Currey	Niece Motorsports	Chevrolet	Mike Stefanik 1999 Truck scheme
45	Erik Darnell	Niece Motorsports	Chevrolet	Erik Darnell throwback
49	Ray Ciccarelli	CMI Motorsports	Chevrolet	
51	Corey Heim	Kyle Busch Motorsports	Toyota	
52	Stewart Friesen	Halmar Friesen Racing	Toyota	Tim Richmond 1986 Folgers scheme
56	Timmy Hill	Hill Motorsports	Chevrolet	Kenny Irwin Jr. 1998 Trucks scheme
75	Parker Kligerman	Henderson Motorsports	Chevrolet	
88	Matt Crafton	ThorSport Racing	Toyota	
96	Todd Peck	Peck Motorsports	Chevrolet	
98	Grant Enfinger	ThorSport Racing	Toyota	
99	Ben Rhodes	ThorSport Racing	Toyota	
Official entry list

== Starting lineup ==
Qualifying was determined by a qualifying metric system based on the last race, the 2021 WISE Power 200 and owner's points. As a result, John Hunter Nemechek of Kyle Busch Motorsports would win the pole.

Pos.	#	Driver	Team	Make
1	4	John Hunter Nemechek	Kyle Busch Motorsports	Toyota
2	16	Austin Hill	Hattori Racing Enterprises	Toyota
3	21	Zane Smith	GMS Racing	Chevrolet
4	99	Ben Rhodes	ThorSport Racing	Toyota
5	38	Todd Gilliland	Front Row Motorsports	Ford
6	13	Johnny Sauter	ThorSport Racing	Toyota
7	52	Stewart Friesen	Halmar Friesen Racing	Toyota
8	18	Chandler Smith	Kyle Busch Motorsports	Toyota
9	88	Matt Crafton	ThorSport Racing	Toyota
10	1	Hailie Deegan	David Gilliland Racing	Ford
11	15	Tanner Gray	David Gilliland Racing	Ford
12	22	Austin Wayne Self	AM Racing	Chevrolet
13	51	Corey Heim	Kyle Busch Motorsports	Toyota
14	42	Carson Hocevar	Niece Motorsports	Chevrolet
15	2	Sheldon Creed	GMS Racing	Chevrolet
16	26	Tyler Ankrum	GMS Racing	Chevrolet
17	98	Grant Enfinger	ThorSport Racing	Toyota
18	40	Ryan Truex	Niece Motorsports	Chevrolet
19	24	Ryan Reed	GMS Racing	Chevrolet
20	19	Derek Kraus	McAnally–Hilgemann Racing	Toyota
21	25	Timothy Peters	Rackley W.A.R.	Chevrolet
22	45	Erik Darnell	Niece Motorsports	Chevrolet
23	34	Akinori Ogata	Reaume Brothers Racing	Toyota
24	23	Chase Purdy	GMS Racing	Chevrolet
25	9	Codie Rohrbaugh	CR7 Motorsports	Chevrolet
26	56	Timmy Hill	Hill Motorsports	Chevrolet
27	30	Danny Bohn	On Point Motorsports	Toyota
28	11	Spencer Davis	Spencer Davis Motorsports	Toyota
29	04	Cory Roper	Roper Racing	Ford
30	02	Kris Wright	Young's Motorsports	Chevrolet
31	3	Jordan Anderson	Jordan Anderson Racing	Chevrolet
32	41	Dawson Cram	Cram Racing Enterprises	Chevrolet
33	12	Tate Fogleman	Young's Motorsports	Chevrolet
34	20	Spencer Boyd	Young's Motorsports	Chevrolet
35	17	David Gilliland	David Gilliland Racing	Ford
36	75	Parker Kligerman	Henderson Motorsports	Chevrolet
37	10	Jennifer Jo Cobb	Jennifer Jo Cobb Racing	Chevrolet
38	44	Bayley Currey	Niece Motorsports	Chevrolet
39	33	B. J. McLeod	Reaume Brothers Racing	Chevrolet
40	6	Norm Benning	Norm Benning Racing	Chevrolet
Failed to qualify
41	14	Trey Hutchens	Trey Hutchens Racing	Chevrolet
42	49	Ray Ciccarelli	CMI Motorsports	Chevrolet
43	96	Todd Peck	Peck Motorsports	Chevrolet
Official starting lineup

== Race results ==
Stage 1 Laps: 45

Fin	#	Driver	Team	Make	Pts
1	38	Todd Gilliland	Front Row Motorsports	Ford	10
2	4	John Hunter Nemechek	Kyle Busch Motorsports	Toyota	9
3	21	Zane Smith	GMS Racing	Chevrolet	8
4	16	Austin Hill	Hattori Racing Enterprises	Toyota	7
5	2	Sheldon Creed	GMS Racing	Chevrolet	6
6	88	Matt Crafton	ThorSport Racing	Toyota	5
7	18	Chandler Smith	Kyle Busch Motorsports	Toyota	4
8	51	Corey Heim	Kyle Busch Motorsports	Toyota	3
9	98	Grant Enfinger	ThorSport Racing	Toyota	2
10	26	Tyler Ankrum	GMS Racing	Chevrolet	1

Stage 2 Laps: 45

Fin	#	Driver	Team	Make	Pts
1	4	John Hunter Nemechek	Kyle Busch Motorsports	Toyota	10
2	51	Corey Heim	Kyle Busch Motorsports	Toyota	9
3	42	Carson Hocevar	Niece Motorsports	Chevrolet	8
4	18	Chandler Smith	Kyle Busch Motorsports	Toyota	7
5	52	Stewart Friesen	Halmar Friesen Racing	Toyota	6
6	56	Timmy Hill	Hill Motorsports	Chevrolet	5
7	38	Todd Gilliland	Front Row Motorsports	Ford	4
8	2	Sheldon Creed	GMS Racing	Chevrolet	3
9	16	Austin Hill	Hattori Racing Enterprises	Toyota	2
10	25	Timothy Peters	Rackley W.A.R.	Chevrolet	1

Stage 3 Laps: 57

Fin	St	#	Driver	Team	Make	Laps	Led	Status	Pts
1	15	2	Sheldon Creed	GMS Racing	Chevrolet	147	7	running	49
2	4	99	Ben Rhodes	ThorSport Racing	Toyota	147	34	running	35
3	14	42	Carson Hocevar	Niece Motorsports	Chevrolet	147	1	running	42
4	9	88	Matt Crafton	ThorSport Racing	Toyota	147	0	running	38
5	17	98	Grant Enfinger	ThorSport Racing	Toyota	147	0	running	34
6	6	13	Johnny Sauter	ThorSport Racing	Toyota	147	0	running	31
7	26	56	Timmy Hill	Hill Motorsports	Chevrolet	147	1	running	35
8	1	4	John Hunter Nemechek	Kyle Busch Motorsports	Toyota	147	65	running	48
9	12	22	Austin Wayne Self	AM Racing	Chevrolet	147	0	running	28
10	31	3	Jordan Anderson	Jordan Anderson Racing	Chevrolet	147	0	running	27
11	18	40	Ryan Truex	Niece Motorsports	Chevrolet	147	4	running	26
12	19	24	Ryan Reed	GMS Racing	Chevrolet	147	0	running	25
13	2	16	Austin Hill	Hattori Racing Enterprises	Toyota	147	11	running	33
14	16	26	Tyler Ankrum	GMS Racing	Chevrolet	147	0	running	24
15	5	38	Todd Gilliland	Front Row Motorsports	Ford	147	17	running	36
16	3	21	Zane Smith	GMS Racing	Chevrolet	147	0	running	29
17	22	45	Erik Darnell	Niece Motorsports	Chevrolet	147	0	running	20
18	27	30	Danny Bohn	On Point Motorsports	Toyota	147	0	running	19
19	21	25	Timothy Peters	Rackley W.A.R.	Chevrolet	147	0	running	19
20	10	1	Hailie Deegan	David Gilliland Racing	Ford	147	0	running	17
21	38	44	Bayley Currey	Niece Motorsports	Chevrolet	146	0	running	16
22	34	20	Spencer Boyd	Young's Motorsports	Chevrolet	144	0	running	15
23	13	51	Corey Heim	Kyle Busch Motorsports	Toyota	142	2	dvp	26
24	37	10	Jennifer Jo Cobb	Jennifer Jo Cobb Racing	Chevrolet	139	0	overheating	13
25	7	52	Stewart Friesen	Halmar Friesen Racing	Toyota	131	2	dvp	18
26	36	75	Parker Kligerman	Henderson Motorsports	Chevrolet	130	0	accident	11
27	8	18	Chandler Smith	Kyle Busch Motorsports	Toyota	126	0	parked	21
28	35	17	David Gilliland	David Gilliland Racing	Ford	117	0	accident	9
29	28	11	Spencer Davis	Spencer Davis Motorsports	Toyota	117	0	accident	8
30	33	12	Tate Fogleman	Young's Motorsports	Chevrolet	117	0	accident	7
31	32	41	Dawson Cram	Cram Racing Enterprises	Chevrolet	117	0	accident	6
32	39	33	B. J. McLeod	Reaume Brothers Racing	Chevrolet	117	0	accident	5
33	11	15	Tanner Gray	David Gilliland Racing	Ford	110	2	accident	4
34	23	34	Akinori Ogata	Reaume Brothers Racing	Toyota	110	1	accident	3
35	20	19	Derek Kraus	McAnally–Hilgemann Racing	Toyota	109	0	running	2
36	24	23	Chase Purdy	GMS Racing	Chevrolet	80	0	accident	1
37	40	6	Norm Benning	Norm Benning Racing	Chevrolet	61	0	too slow	1
38	25	9	Codie Rohrbaugh	CR7 Motorsports	Chevrolet	26	0	accident	1
39	30	02	Kris Wright	Young's Motorsports	Chevrolet	25	0	accident	1
40	29	04	Cory Roper	Roper Racing	Ford	13	0	accident	1
Official race results

Previous race: 2021 WISE Power 200	NASCAR Camping World Truck Series; 2021 season	Next race: 2021 Toyota Tundra 225
