= Gust Goettl =

Austria-Hungarian American inventor and businessman (1910–2004)

Gust Goettl (December 3, 1910–November 24, 2004) was an inventor, entrepreneur, businessman. Many times he did not invent a product, but he used existing designs to influence future designs. For example, “he did not invent the evaporative cooler, he kept improving it". One of his changes to this product resulted in the "Combination Refrigeration and Evaporative Cooling Air Conditioner,” designed to improve cooling in arid climates.

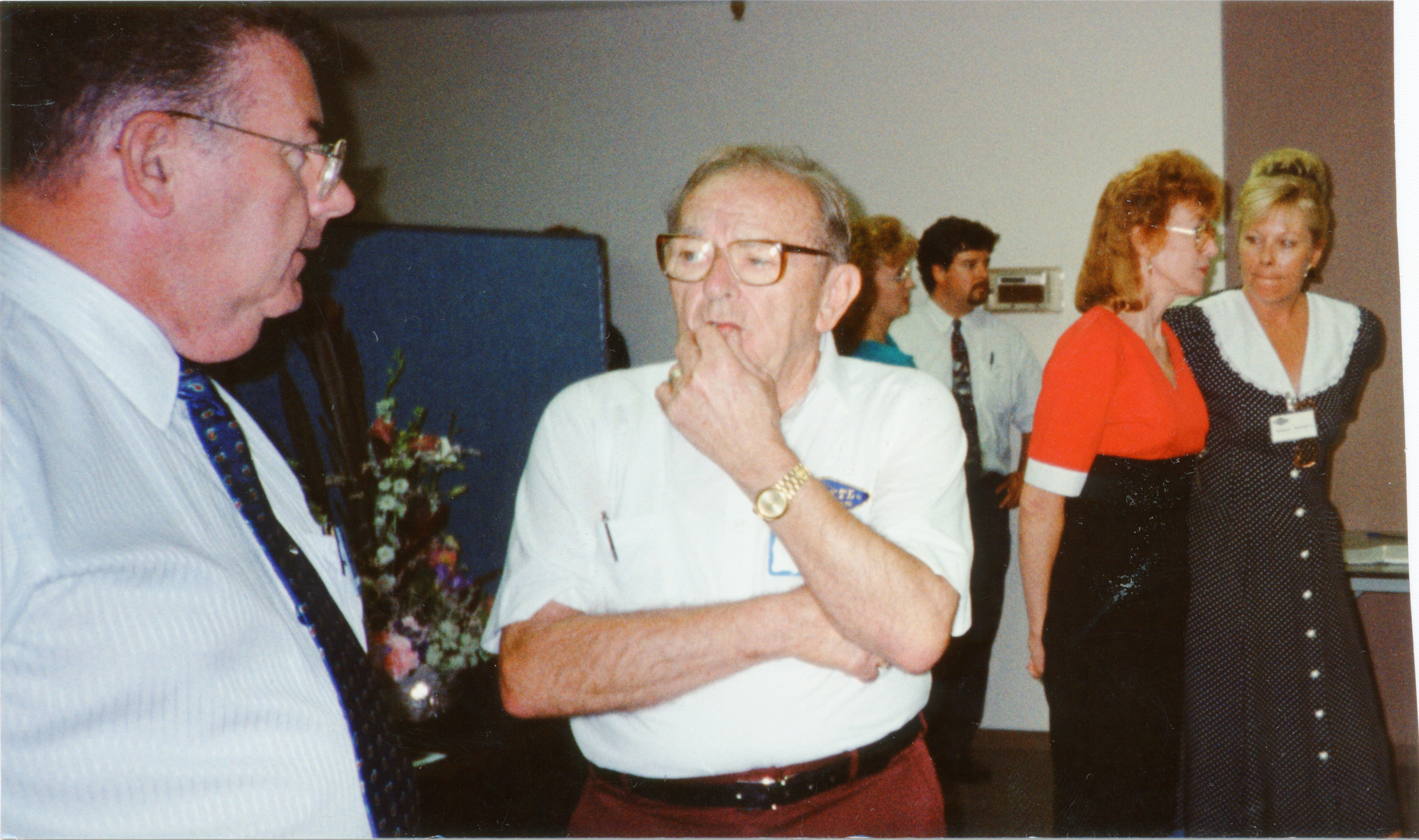
Gust Goettl at Goettl Facility Open House

== Early life ==
Goettl was born on December 3, 1910, in Austria-Hungary. He moved to Mansfield, Ohio in 1913 with his family and was later inspired by the weather there to seek a job in the heating and cooling industry. From a young age, he was an inventor.

== Career ==
Goettl worked throughout his life in the HVAC community. With his brother, Adam, they founded Phoenix-based Goettl Air Conditioning on February 14, 1939. During World War II, the Goettl brothers shifted their focus to manufacturing operations, contributing to the war effort and highlighting the potential value of cooling technology.

In 1939, Gust also helped his brothers Adam and William Goettl to form IMPCO (International Metal Products Co.), which became a market leader by the 1940s in the evaporative cooler industry. Gust and Adam, as sole stockholders, sold the company in the 1960s to International Metal and sold the building they worked in to McGraw-Edison. An employee of McGraw-Edison fell through the roof shortly after and accused the Goettl brothers of negligence.

== Personal life ==
Gust was involved in community work. He enjoyed the outdoors through traveling, fishing, hunting, camping and golfing. He was the 54th person in the state of Arizona to earn the Arizona Wildlife Sportsmen Big 10 award. Gust was a man of faith, and a member of the Shepherd of the Valley Lutheran Church, where he was named Churchman Cum Laude in 1959 and helped build a new church building for the congregation. Gust's charity work included fundraising for child-oriented organizations and for the Phoenix Lighthouse Mission, which awarded him in 1967 for his service.

Gust Goettl married Magdalene Kelpp on June 10, 1933, in Mansfield, Ohio. They were married for 71 years until Gust died at the age of 93 on November 24, 2004.
