= Vizion Motorsports =

NASCAR team

- Owner(s): J. D. Cole; Teddy and Jennifer Brown (former)
- Base: Mooresville, North Carolina
- Series: NASCAR Gander RV & Outdoors Truck Series; ARCA Menards Series
- Manufacturer: Toyota
- Opened: 2017
- Closed: 2019

Career
- Debut: Xfinity Series: 2017 Kansas Lottery 300 (Kansas); Gander RV & Outdoors Truck Series: 2018 JAG Metals 350 (Texas); ARCA Menards Series: 2019 Lucas Oil 200 (Daytona)
- Latest race: Xfinity Series: 2017 Kansas Lottery 300 (Kansas); Gander RV & Outdoors Truck Series: 2018 Ford EcoBoost 200 (Homestead); ARCA Menards Series: 2019 General Tire 150 (Charlotte)
- Drivers' Championships: 0
- Race victories: 0
- Pole positions: 0

Vizion Motorsports (formerly NextGen Motorsports) was an American professional stock car racing team, active between 2017 and 2019, that last competed in the NASCAR Gander RV & Outdoors Truck Series and the ARCA Menards Series. In the Truck Series, the team currently fielded a Toyota Tundra part-time for Josh White and in the ARCA Menards Series, the team fielded the No. 36 Toyota part-time for Josh White as well as the No. 35 Toyota. The team (when it was known as NextGen Motorsports) had also competed in the ARCA Menards Series East and NASCAR Xfinity Series in the past.

== Xfinity Series ==
In 2017, the team made their first foray into the series, helping MBM Motorsports to field two of their drivers in MBM's Nos. 13/40 cars at the road-course races: Enrique Baca at Watkins Glen and Mid-Ohio and Ernie Francis Jr. at Road America. Later that year, NextGen fielded an Xfinity team on their own for the first time, the No. 55 Toyota, in two races. Their first attempt was at Kansas in mid-October with Josh Berry, finishing 33rd. The second attempt was at Homestead with Matt Mills, but he did not qualify for the race.

== Gander RV & Outdoors Truck Series ==
In 2018, NextGen made their Truck debut, initially planning to do so at Martinsville in March 2018 when they entered the No. 35 Chevrolet for Travis Kvapil, but the team wound up withdrawing the entry when there was rain in the forecast and they would have failed to qualify due to having no owner points.

They later attempted the race at Kentucky, fielding the No. 83 for Tyler Matthews in a partnership with Copp Motorsports. Matthews made contact with the wall on lap one and finished 32nd.

NextGen announced on October 24, 2018 that Inspectra Thermal Solutions would sponsor Parker Kligerman at Texas Motor Speedway in the JAG Metals 350, however, Kligerman later decided to back out and Brennan Poole was named as his replacement. A 15th-place finish was marred by a practice penalty for losing ballast weight. The penalty suspended NextGen's crew chief, truck chief and chief mechanic until after the 2019 NextEra Energy Resources 250. The team returned two weeks later renamed as Vizion Motorsports in the Truck Series season finale at Homestead-Miami Speedway with Poole, finishing 19th.

On February 9, 2019, announced that Bayley Currey would pilot the No. 35 in select races in the 2019 season. Continuing to enter select events part time, the team used the owner points from the Beaver Motorsports No. 1 truck for Currey because of the large number of entries in the Truck Series at the start of the season. The No. 1 already had some owner points while if Vizion were to attempt to run on their own using the No. 35, they would have none and less of a chance of qualifying for the races they attempted.

On December 19, 2019, Vizion announced they would be returning in 2020 after missing most of the 2019 season due to financial problems. Josh White will run some Truck and ARCA races for the team, and they also mentioned he could run Trucks full-time in 2021 if he does well enough in 2020 and if sponsorship is found, but nothing ever materialized.

== ARCA Menards Series East ==
The team fielded three part-time cars (No. 5, No. 9 and No. 25) in 2017. The No. 5 and the No. 25 returned in 2018, and the team also added a third car, the No. 55.

=== Car No. 5 history ===
In 2017, they fielded No. 5 Chevrolet for Enrique Baca and Luis Rodriguez, Jr. In 2018, the team returned with Juan Manuel González and Dale Quarterley behind the wheel.

=== Car No. 9 history ===
In 2017, in a partnership with Troy Williams' team, NextGen fielded the No. 9 Ford for Baca, Brandon Lynn and Woody Pitkat.

=== Car No. 25 history ===
In 2017, they fielded No. 25 Chevrolet/Toyota for Baca and David Levine. Levine returned once again in 2018 for New Jersey Motorsports Park race.

=== Car No. 55 history ===
In 2018, they fielded No. 55 Toyota for Abraham Calderón and Marcos Gomes.

== ARCA Menards Series ==
=== Car No. 35 history ===
The team announced plans to debut in ARCA starting in 2019, with rookie Brenden Queen set to run full time in the No. 35 Toyota. However, due to lack of sponsorship, he only ended up attempting the season opener at Daytona that year.

Vizion later ran the No. 35 at Charlotte with Devin Dodson. Also, Bobby Dale Earnhardt tried to run some races with the team, but sponsorship was not found.

=== Car No. 36 history ===
A second car for Vizion, the No. 36, driven by Paul Williamson, ran at Daytona along with the No. 35 of Queen. Salvatore Iovino was originally going to drive that car at Daytona as well as some other races throughout the season with sponsorship from Body Symmetry MD, which did not end up happening.

In September 2019, it was reported by ThePitLane.com that Josh White signed with Vizion to potentially run the ARCA season opener at Daytona and some Truck races if the team can find sponsorship. This was later confirmed by the team on December 19, 2019. White will drive the No. 36 Toyota at Daytona and other races during the 2020 ARCA season, and possibly the full schedule if sponsorship is found.
