= Todd Peck =

American racing driver

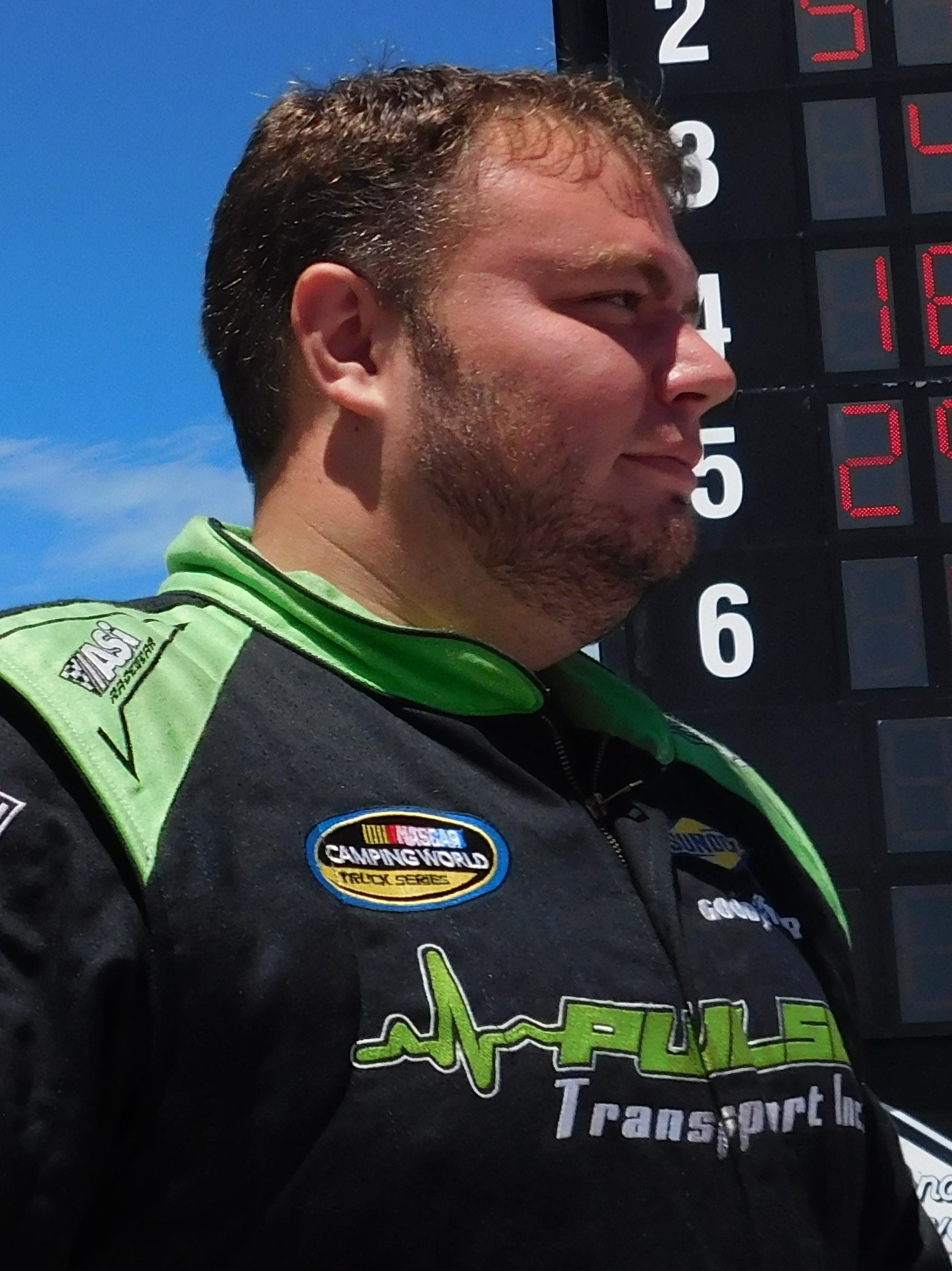
- Peck at Pocono Raceway in 2017
- Born: Todd Michael Peck; January 29, 1986 (age 40); Glenville, Pennsylvania, U.S.

NASCAR O'Reilly Auto Parts Series career
- 13 races run over 3 years
- 2019 position: 99th
- Best finish: 38th (2016)
- First race: 2015 Lakes Region 200 (Loudon)
- Last race: 2019 Pocono Green 250 (Pocono)
Wins	Top tens	Poles
0	0	0

NASCAR FedEx Freight Truck Series career
- 35 races run over 9 years
- 2021 position: 82nd
- Best finish: 34th (2017)
- First race: 2011 Coca Cola 200 (Iowa)
- Last race: 2021 CRC Brakleen 150 (Pocono)
Wins	Top tens	Poles
0	0	0
- Statistics up to date as of February 17, 2023.

Todd Michael Peck (born January 29, 1986) is an American professional stock car racing driver. He last competed part-time in the NASCAR Craftsman Truck Series, driving the No. 96 Toyota Tundra for Peck Motorsports. He has also raced in the NASCAR Xfinity Series and the X-1R Pro Cup Series.

== Racing career ==
=== Xfinity Series ===
Peck made his Xfinity debut at New Hampshire driving for Rick Ware Racing. Peck started 35th and finished 30th. It would be his only start of the year.

In 2016, Peck ran occasionally for B. J. McLeod Motorsports, mostly in the No. 15 car. Peck recorded five top-30 finishes in 11 starts, and also failed to finish three races, including a last-place finish in the Lilly Diabetes 250.

=== NASCAR Craftsman Truck Series ===
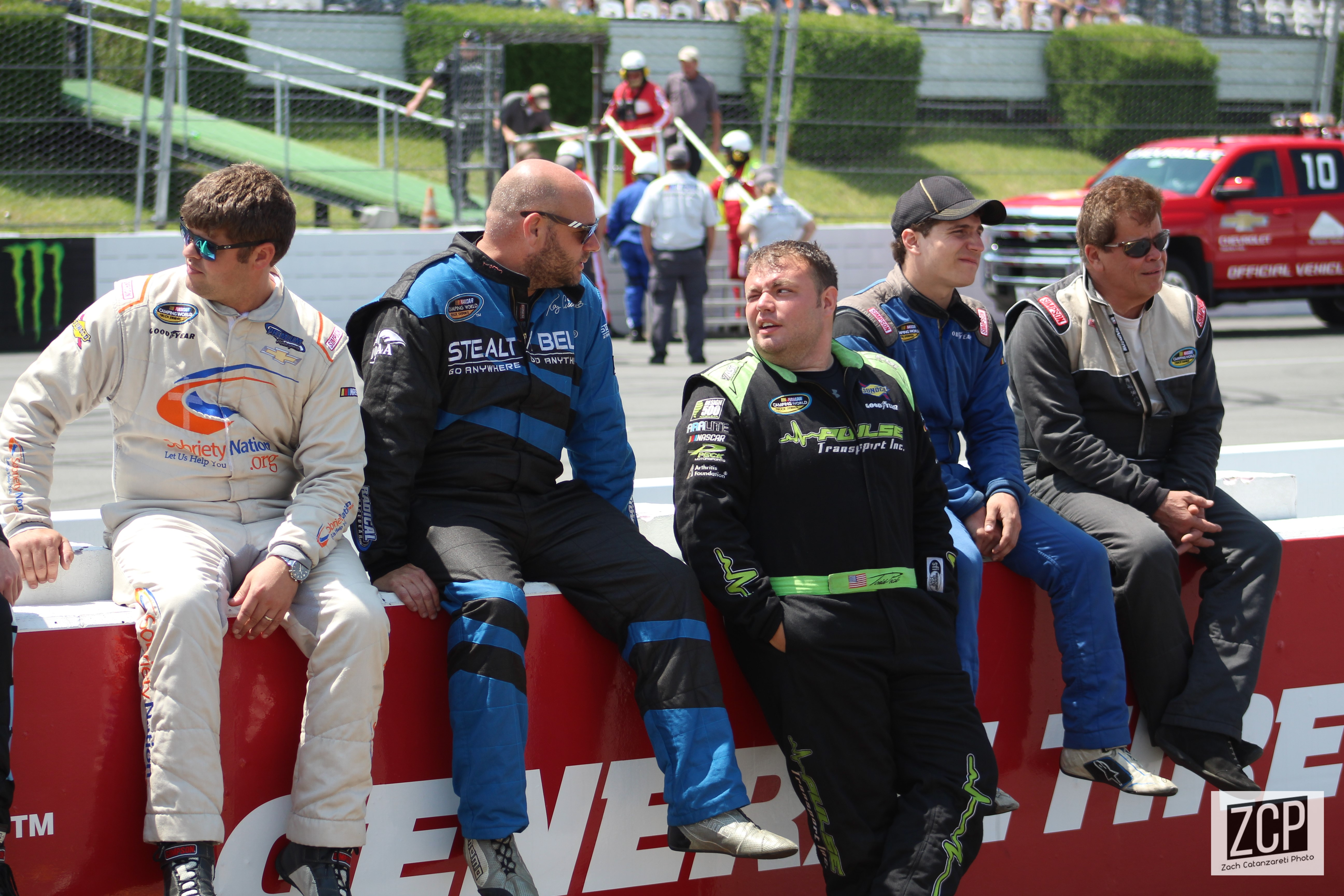
Peck (in the center) talking to drivers Wendell Chavous, Ray Ciccarelli, Camden Murphy, and Norm Benning on the Pocono Raceway pit wall before the start of the race there in 2018.

Peck's first year in the series was 2011, driving three races for Peck Motorsports, a team owned by his father, Michael Peck. Todd recorded a best finish of 27th at O'Reilly Raceway Park. Peck ran one race for his father and one race for SS-Green Light Racing in 2012. He scored a best finish of 18th, at the fall Phoenix race.

In 2013, Peck ran three races, two for his father and one for Norm Benning Racing. His best finish was 27th at Pocono. In 2014, he started five races, four for his father and one for SS-Green Light. His best effort was a 20th at Chicagoland.

Peck returned in 2015 and attempted six races and made three with Peck Motorsports and one for B. J. McLeod Motorsports, with the best finish being a 21st at Pocono. Running three races in 2016 for his father, Peck recorded a best finish of 21st at Pocono Raceway, and finished 25th and 29th in subsequent starts.

In 2017, Peck started a career-high ten races for Copp Motorsports, starting and parking eight. Peck tied his career-best finish of 18th place at the season-opener at Daytona avoiding accidents.

In 2020, Peck drove again for his family team for the season-opening race at Daytona, but failed to qualify. The team returned to using the No. 96 after Niece Motorsports had taken their old No. 40 and the No. 96 was not being used.

In 2021, Peck drove for Cram Racing Enterprises at the CRC Brakleen 150 with sponsorship from Holla Vodka.

=== K&N Pro Series East ===
Peck drove in sixteen races from 2007–2010, scoring a best finish of fourteenth at Thompson Speedway Motorsports Park in 2009. He received funding from Addiction Management Center for a large part of his career.

=== X-1R Pro Cup Series ===
From 2002 to 2006, Peck made 38 starts. He scored one top-ten finish, a tenth at South Boston in 2005.

== Personal life ==
Peck was diagnosed with rheumatoid arthritis when he was fifteen and is one of the leading racecar drivers with that condition. His uncle Tom Peck raced in the Xfinity Series from 1984 to 1995.

== Motorsports career results ==
=== NASCAR ===
(key) (Bold – Pole position awarded by qualifying time. Italics – Pole position earned by points standings or practice time. * – Most laps led.)

==== Xfinity Series ====
NASCAR Xfinity Series results
Year	Team	No.	Make	1	2	3	4	5	6	7	8	9	10	11	12	13	14	15	16	17	18	19	20	21	22	23	24	25	26	27	28	29	30	31	32	33	NXSC	Pts	Ref
2015	Rick Ware Racing	15	Chevy	DAY	ATL	LVS	PHO	CAL	TEX	BRI	RCH	TAL	IOW	CLT	DOV	MCH	CHI	DAY	KEN	NHA; 30	IND	IOW	GLN	MOH	BRI	ROA	DAR	RCH	CHI	KEN	DOV	CLT	KAN	TEX	PHO	HOM	73rd	14	
2016	B. J. McLeod Motorsports	99	Ford	DAY	ATL; 38	LVS; DNQ	PHO; DNQ																														38th	92	
2016	Rick Ware Racing	15	Ford				PHO; 37	CAL; 30	TEX; 37	BRI																											38th	92	
2016	B. J. McLeod Motorsports	90	Ford								RCH; 32	TAL	DOV	CLT																							38th	92	
2016	B. J. McLeod Motorsports	15	Ford												POC; 28	MCH; 30	IOW	DAY			IND; 40	IOW	GLN	MOH	BRI	ROA	DAR; 28	RCH	CHI								38th	92	
2016	B. J. McLeod Motorsports	25	Ford																KEN; 34	NHA																	38th	92	
2016	Rick Ware Racing	25	Ford																											KEN; 25	DOV	CLT	KAN	TEX	PHO	HOM	38th	92	
2019	B. J. McLeod Motorsports	99	Chevy	DAY	ATL	LVS	PHO	CAL	TEX	BRI	RCH	TAL	DOV	CLT	POC; 27	MCH	IOW	CHI	DAY	KEN	NHA	IOW	GLN	MOH	BRI	ROA	DAR	IND	LVS	RCH	ROV	DOV	KAN	TEX	PHO	HOM	99th	0^{1}	

==== Craftsman Truck Series ====
NASCAR Craftsman Truck Series results
Year	Team	No.	Make	1	2	3	4	5	6	7	8	9	10	11	12	13	14	15	16	17	18	19	20	21	22	23	24	25	NCTC	Pts	Ref
2011	Peck Motorsports	96	Chevy	DAY	PHO	DAR	MAR	NSH	DOV	CLT	KAN	TEX	KEN	IOW; 31	NSH	IRP; 27	POC	MCH	BRI; Wth	ATL	CHI	NHA; 31	KEN	LVS	TAL	MAR	TEX	HOM	63rd	26	
2012	Peck Motorsports	96	Chevy	DAY	MAR	CAR	KAN	CLT	DOV	TEX	KEN	IOW; DNQ	CHI	POC	MCH	BRI	ATL	IOW; 28	KEN	LVS	TAL	MAR; DNQ	TEX						56th	42	
2012	SS-Green Light Racing	08	Chevy																					PHO; 18	HOM				56th	42	
2013	Peck Motorsports	07	Chevy	DAY	MAR	CAR	KAN	CLT	DOV	TEX	KEN; 29	IOW	ELD																55th	32	
2013	Peck Motorsports	40	Chevy											POC; 27															55th	32	
2013	Norm Benning Racing	75	Chevy												MCH; 31	BRI	MSP	IOW	CHI	LVS	TAL	MAR	TEX	PHO	HOM				55th	32	
2014	Peck Motorsports	40	Chevy	DAY; DNQ	MAR	KAN	CLT	DOV; 33	TEX	GTW	KEN	IOW	ELD	POC; 25				CHI; 20	NHA	LVS	TAL	MAR	TEX	PHO					42nd	89	
2014	SS-Green Light Racing	07	Chevy												MCH; 27	BRI	MSP												42nd	89	
2014	Peck Motorsports	07	Chevy																						HOM; 26				42nd	89	
2015	Peck Motorsports	40	Chevy	DAY; 27	ATL	MAR	KAN	CLT; DNQ	DOV	TEX	GTW	IOW	KEN	ELD	POC; 21	MCH; 31	BRI	MSP	CHI	NHA	LVS	TAL	MAR						46th	69	
2015	B. J. McLeod Motorsports	45	Chevy																					TEX; 28	PHO				46th	69	
2015	Peck Motorsports	45	Chevy																							HOM; DNQ			46th	69	
2016	Peck Motorsports	07	Chevy	DAY	ATL	MAR	KAN	DOV	CLT	TEX	IOW	GTW	KEN	ELD	POC; 21	BRI	MCH; 29	MSP	CHI	NHA	LVS; 25	TAL	MAR	TEX	PHO	HOM			101st	0^{1}	
2017	Copp Motorsports	83	Chevy	DAY; 18	ATL; 32	MAR	KAN; 29		DOV; 31	TEX; 24	GTW	IOW	KEN	ELD	POC; 19	MCH; 28	BRI												34th	99	
2017	Copp Motorsports	63	Chevy					CLT; 32										MSP; 29	CHI	NHA	LVS; 29	TAL	MAR	TEX	PHO	HOM			34th	99	
2018	Beaver Motorsports	50	Chevy	DAY	ATL	LVS	MAR	DOV; 32	KAN	CLT	TEX; 32	IOW	GTW	CHI	KEN	ELD													58th	35	
2018	Copp Motorsports	83	Chevy														POC; 23									HOM; Wth			58th	35	
2018	Premium Motorsports	15	Chevy															MCH; 26	BRI	MSP	LVS	TAL	MAR	TEX	PHO				58th	35	
2020	Peck Motorsports	96	Chevy	DAY; DNQ	LVS	CLT	ATL	HOM	POC	KEN	TEX	KAN	KAN	MCH	DRC	DOV	GTW	DAR	RCH	BRI	LVS	TAL	KAN	TEX	MAR	PHO			95th	–	
2021	Peck Motorsports	96	Chevy	DAY; DNQ	DRC	LVS	ATL	BRD	RCH	KAN	DAR; DNQ	COA	CLT	TEX	NSH										PHO; Wth				82nd	8	
2021	Cram Racing Enterprises	41	Chevy													POC; 29	KNX	GLN	GTW	DAR	BRI	LVS	TAL	MAR					82nd	8	
2023	Peck Motorsports	96	Toyota	DAY; DNQ	LVS	ATL	COA	TEX	BRD	MAR	KAN	DAR	NWS	CLT	GTW	NSH	MOH	POC	RCH	IRP	MLW	KAN	BRI	TAL	HOM	PHO			N/A	0	

^{*} Season still in progress
^{1} Ineligible for series points

==== K&N Pro Series East ====
NASCAR K&N Pro Series East results
Year	Team	No.	Make	1	2	3	4	5	6	7	8	9	10	11	12	13	NKNPSEC	Pts	Ref
2007	Peck Motorsports	50	Chevy	GRE; 27	ELK	IOW	SBO; 22	STA	NHA; 30	TMP	NSH; 22	ADI	LRP	MFD	NHA; 40	DOV	32nd	392	
2008	Peck Motorsports	50	Chevy	GRE; DNQ	IOW			NHA; 33	TMP	MCM; 26	ADI	LRP	MFD	NHA; 27	DOV	STA	33rd	374	
2008	Jamerson Motorsports	84	Chevy			SBO; 30	GLN										33rd	374	
2009	Peck Motorsports	50	Chevy	GRE; 16	TRI	IOW	SBO; 23	GLN	NHA	TMP; 14	ADI; 21	LRP	NHA; 23	DOV			22nd	524	
2010	Peck Motorsports	50	Chevy	GRE; DNQ	SBO	IOW	MAR; 32	NHA	LRP	LEE; 21	GRE	NHA	DOV				37th	237	
