= 2018 Gander Outdoors 150 =

Race details
- Race 14 of 23 of the 2018 NASCAR Camping World Truck Series
- Date: July 28, 2018
- Official name: Gander Outdoors 150
- Location: Long Pond, Pennsylvania, Pocono Raceway
- Course: Permanent racing facility
- Course length: 2.5 miles (4.0 km)
- Distance: 60 laps, 150 mi (241.402 km)
- Scheduled distance: 60 laps, 150 mi (241.402 km)
- Average speed: 136.813 miles per hour (220.179 km/h)

Pole position
Driver	Kyle Busch	Kyle Busch Motorsports
- Time: 52.834

Most laps led
Driver	Kyle Busch	Kyle Busch Motorsports
- Laps: 43

Winner
No. 51	Kyle Busch	Kyle Busch Motorsports

Television in the United States
- Network: Fox Sports 1
- Announcers: Vince Welch, Phil Parsons, Michael Waltrip

Radio in the United States
- Radio: Motor Racing Network

The 2018 Gander Outdoors 150 was the 14th stock car race of the 2018 NASCAR Camping World Truck Series season and the 9th iteration of the event. The race was held on Saturday, July 28. 2018, in Long Pond, Pennsylvania at Pocono Raceway, a 2.5 miles (4.0 km) triangular permanent course. The race took the scheduled 60 laps to complete. At race's end, Kyle Busch driving for his own team Kyle Busch Motorsports would dominate and win his 51st NASCAR Camping World Truck Series career win and his second of the season. To fill out the podium, Erik Jones of Kyle Busch Motorsports and Dalton Sargeant of GMS Racing would finish second and third, respectively.

== Background ==
=== Entry list ===
#	Driver	Team	Make	Sponsor
0	Camden Murphy	Jennifer Jo Cobb Racing	Chevrolet	Jennifer Jo Cobb Racing
2	Cody Coughlin	GMS Racing	Chevrolet	Jegs
02	Austin Hill	Young's Motorsports	Chevrolet	Randco, Young's Building Systems
3	Jordan Anderson	Jordan Anderson Racing	Chevrolet	Lucas Oil, Bommarito Automotive Group
4	Todd Gilliland	Kyle Busch Motorsports	Toyota	Mobil 1
6	Norm Benning	Norm Benning Racing	Chevrolet	Norm Benning Racing
8	Joe Nemechek	NEMCO Motorsports	Chevrolet	D. A. B. Constructors, Inc.
10	Jennifer Jo Cobb	Jennifer Jo Cobb Racing	Chevrolet	Driven2Honor.org
13	Myatt Snider	ThorSport Racing	Ford	Century Container
15	Reed Sorenson	Premium Motorsports	Chevrolet	Premium Motorsports
16	Brett Moffitt	Hattori Racing Enterprises	Toyota	Toyota Tsusho
18	Noah Gragson*	Kyle Busch Motorsports	Toyota	Safelite Auto Glass
20	Tanner Thorson	Young's Motorsports	Chevrolet	Maestro's
21	Johnny Sauter	GMS Racing	Chevrolet	ISM Connect
22	Austin Wayne Self	Niece Motorsports	Chevrolet	AM Technical Solutions, GO TEXAN.
24	Justin Haley	GMS Racing	Chevrolet	Fraternal Order of Eagles
25	Dalton Sargeant	GMS Racing	Chevrolet	Performance Plus Motor Oil
33	Josh Reaume	Reaume Brothers Racing	Chevrolet	Lehigh Valley Phantoms
34	J. J. Yeley	Reaume Brothers Racing	Chevrolet	Reaume Brothers Racing
41	Ben Rhodes	ThorSport Racing	Ford	The Carolina Nut Company
45	Justin Fontaine	Niece Motorsports	Chevrolet	ProMatic Automation
49	Wendell Chavous	Premium Motorsports	Chevrolet	SobrietyNation.org
50	Ray Ciccarelli	Beaver Motorsports	Chevrolet	Image Tech
51	Kyle Busch	Kyle Busch Motorsports	Toyota	Beechcraft, Cessna
52	Stewart Friesen	Halmar Friesen Racing	Chevrolet	Halmar "We Build America"
54	Bo LeMastus	DGR-Crosley	Toyota	Crosley Brands
63	Bayley Currey	Copp Motorsports	Chevrolet	Copp Motorsports
74	B. J. McLeod	Mike Harmon Racing	Chevrolet	Horizon Transport
83	Todd Peck	Copp Motorsports	Chevrolet	Pulse Transport Inc.
87	Timmy Hill	NEMCO Motorsports	Chevrolet	NEMCO Motorsports
88	Matt Crafton	ThorSport Racing	Ford	Menards, Goof Off "Works the 1st Time!"
98	Grant Enfinger	ThorSport Racing	Ford	Champion Power Equipment "Powering Your Life."
Official entry list

*Driver changed to Erik Jones due to Gragson suffering from a stomach virus from which NASCAR did not medically clear Gragson to race.

== Practice ==
=== First and final practice ===
Originally, two sessions were meant to be held during the weekend. While the first session had started, only 15 minutes were run until heavy lightning forced the cancellation of the first practice. Any drivers who set a time within the first 15 minutes would have their times transfer over to the second practice.

The only practice session of the weekend would take place on Friday, July 27, at 2:00 p.m. EST. Noah Gragson of Kyle Busch Motorsports would set the fastest time in the session, with a lap of 53.339 and an average speed of 168.732 miles per hour (271.548 km/h).

Pos.	#	Driver	Team	Make	Time	Speed
1	18	Noah Gragson	Kyle Busch Motorsports	Toyota	53.339	168.732
2	13	Myatt Snider	ThorSport Racing	Ford	53.563	168.026
3	24	Justin Haley	GMS Racing	Chevrolet	53.607	167.889
Full final practice results

== Qualifying ==
Qualifying would take place on Saturday, July 28, at 10:00 a.m. EST. Since Pocono Raceway is at least a 1.5 miles (2.4 km) racetrack, the qualifying system was a single car, single lap, two round system where in the first round, everyone would set a time to determine positions 13-32. Then, the fastest 12 qualifiers would move on to the second round to determine positions 1-12.

Kyle Busch of Kyle Busch Motorsports would win the pole after setting the fastest lap in both rounds, with Busch setting in the second round a time with a 52.834 and an average speed of 170.345 miles per hour (274.144 km/h). No drivers would fail to qualify.

=== Full qualifying results ===
Pos.	#	Driver	Team	Make	Time (R1)	Speed (R1)	Time (R2)	Speed (R2)
1	51	Kyle Busch	Kyle Busch Motorsports	Toyota	52.931	170.033	52.834	170.345
2	4	Todd Gilliland	Kyle Busch Motorsports	Toyota	53.395	168.555	53.175	169.252
3	24	Justin Haley	GMS Racing	Chevrolet	53.201	169.170	53.217	169.119
4	25	Dalton Sargeant	GMS Racing	Chevrolet	53.489	168.259	53.415	168.492
5	98	Grant Enfinger	ThorSport Racing	Ford	54.002	166.660	53.499	168.227
6	8	Joe Nemechek	NEMCO Motorsports	Chevrolet	53.818	167.230	53.661	167.720
7	21	Johnny Sauter	GMS Racing	Chevrolet	53.904	166.963	53.694	167.616
8	13	Myatt Snider	ThorSport Racing	Ford	53.724	167.523	53.965	166.775
9	02	Austin Hill	Young's Motorsports	Chevrolet	53.937	166.861	54.249	165.902
10	2	Cody Coughlin	GMS Racing	Chevrolet	54.010	166.636	54.397	165.450
11	20	Tanner Thorson	Young's Motorsports	Chevrolet	54.449	165.292	55.307	162.728
12	52	Stewart Friesen	Halmar Friesen Racing	Chevrolet	54.025	166.590	—	—
Eliminated in Round 2
13	22	Austin Wayne Self	Niece Motorsports	Chevrolet	54.565	164.941	—	—
14	41	Ben Rhodes	ThorSport Racing	Ford	54.741	164.411	—	—
15	54	Bo LeMastus	DGR-Crosley	Toyota	55.068	163.434	—	—
16	3	Jordan Anderson	Jordan Anderson Racing	Chevrolet	55.110	163.310	—	—
17	45	Justin Fontaine	Niece Motorsports	Chevrolet	55.208	163.020	—	—
18	15	Reed Sorenson	Premium Motorsports	Chevrolet	55.239	162.928	—	—
19	49	Wendell Chavous	Premium Motorsports	Chevrolet	55.312	162.713	—	—
20	88	Matt Crafton	ThorSport Racing	Ford	55.430	162.367	—	—
21	87	Timmy Hill	NEMCO Motorsports	Chevrolet	55.628	161.789	—	—
22	0	Camden Murphy	Jennifer Jo Cobb Racing	Chevrolet	56.111	160.396	—	—
23	33	Josh Reaume	Reaume Brothers Racing	Chevrolet	56.211	160.111	—	—
24	34	J. J. Yeley	Reaume Brothers Racing	Chevrolet	56.211	160.111	—	—
25	83	Todd Peck	Copp Motorsports	Chevrolet	56.539	159.182	—	—
26	74	B. J. McLeod	Mike Harmon Racing	Chevrolet	56.553	159.143	—	—
27	63	Bayley Currey	Copp Motorsports	Chevrolet	57.115	157.577	—	—
28	6	Norm Benning	Norm Benning Racing	Chevrolet	59.270	151.847	—	—
29	50	Ray Ciccarelli	Beaver Motorsports	Chevrolet	1:00.079	149.803	—	—
30	10	Jennifer Jo Cobb	Jennifer Jo Cobb Racing	Chevrolet	1:00.207	149.484	—	—
Qualified on owner's points
31	18	Noah Gragson	Kyle Busch Motorsports	Toyota	—	—	—	—
32	16	Brett Moffitt	Hattori Racing Enterprises	Toyota	—	—	—	—
Official qualifying results
Official starting lineup

== Race results ==
Stage 1 Laps: 15

Fin	#	Driver	Team	Make	Pts
1	4	Todd Gilliland	Kyle Busch Motorsports	Toyota	10
2	24	Justin Haley	GMS Racing	Chevrolet	9
3	25	Dalton Sargeant	GMS Racing	Chevrolet	8
4	18	Erik Jones	Kyle Busch Motorsports	Toyota	0
5	98	Grant Enfinger	ThorSport Racing	Ford	6
6	8	Joe Nemechek	NEMCO Motorsports	Chevrolet	5
7	21	Johnny Sauter	GMS Racing	Chevrolet	4
8	52	Stewart Friesen	Halmar Friesen Racing	Chevrolet	3
9	2	Cody Coughlin	GMS Racing	Chevrolet	2
10	02	Austin Hill	Young's Motorsports	Chevrolet	1

Stage 2 Laps: 15

Fin	#	Driver	Team	Make	Pts
1	52	Stewart Friesen	Halmar Friesen Racing	Chevrolet	10
2	98	Grant Enfinger	ThorSport Racing	Ford	9
3	13	Myatt Snider	ThorSport Racing	Ford	8
4	2	Cody Coughlin	GMS Racing	Chevrolet	7
5	02	Austin Hill	Young's Motorsports	Chevrolet	6
6	41	Ben Rhodes	ThorSport Racing	Ford	5
7	20	Tanner Thorson	Young's Motorsports	Chevrolet	4
8	3	Jordan Anderson	Jordan Anderson Racing	Chevrolet	3
9	45	Justin Fontaine	Niece Motorsports	Chevrolet	2
10	22	Austin Wayne Self	Niece Motorsports	Chevrolet	1

Stage 3 Laps: 30

Fin	St	#	Driver	Team	Make	Laps	Led	Status	Pts
1	1	51	Kyle Busch	Kyle Busch Motorsports	Toyota	60	43	running	0
2	31	18	Erik Jones	Kyle Busch Motorsports	Toyota	60	1	running	0
3	4	25	Dalton Sargeant	GMS Racing	Chevrolet	60	4	running	42
4	12	52	Stewart Friesen	Halmar Friesen Racing	Chevrolet	60	4	running	46
5	3	24	Justin Haley	GMS Racing	Chevrolet	60	0	running	41
6	5	98	Grant Enfinger	ThorSport Racing	Ford	60	0	running	46
7	2	4	Todd Gilliland	Kyle Busch Motorsports	Toyota	60	7	running	40
8	7	21	Johnny Sauter	GMS Racing	Chevrolet	60	0	running	33
9	20	88	Matt Crafton	ThorSport Racing	Ford	60	0	running	28
10	6	8	Joe Nemechek	NEMCO Motorsports	Chevrolet	60	0	running	32
11	14	41	Ben Rhodes	ThorSport Racing	Ford	60	0	running	31
12	8	13	Myatt Snider	ThorSport Racing	Ford	60	1	running	33
13	9	02	Austin Hill	Young's Motorsports	Chevrolet	60	0	running	31
14	10	2	Cody Coughlin	GMS Racing	Chevrolet	60	0	running	32
15	11	20	Tanner Thorson	Young's Motorsports	Chevrolet	60	0	running	26
16	16	3	Jordan Anderson	Jordan Anderson Racing	Chevrolet	60	0	running	24
17	17	45	Justin Fontaine	Niece Motorsports	Chevrolet	60	0	running	22
18	13	22	Austin Wayne Self	Niece Motorsports	Chevrolet	59	0	running	20
19	23	33	Josh Reaume	Reaume Brothers Racing	Chevrolet	59	0	running	18
20	15	54	Bo LeMastus	DGR-Crosley	Toyota	59	0	running	17
21	19	49	Wendell Chavous	Premium Motorsports	Chevrolet	59	0	running	16
22	30	10	Jennifer Jo Cobb	Jennifer Jo Cobb Racing	Chevrolet	59	0	running	15
23	25	83	Todd Peck	Copp Motorsports	Chevrolet	59	0	running	14
24	26	74	B. J. McLeod	Mike Harmon Racing	Chevrolet	59	0	running	0
25	28	6	Norm Benning	Norm Benning Racing	Chevrolet	57	0	running	12
26	32	16	Brett Moffitt	Hattori Racing Enterprises	Toyota	53	0	running	11
27	29	50	Ray Ciccarelli	Beaver Motorsports	Chevrolet	31	0	vibration	10
28	21	87	Timmy Hill	NEMCO Motorsports	Chevrolet	23	0	vibration	0
29	22	0	Camden Murphy	Jennifer Jo Cobb Racing	Chevrolet	17	0	electrical	8
30	18	15	Reed Sorenson	Premium Motorsports	Chevrolet	17	0	electrical	0
31	24	34	J. J. Yeley	Reaume Brothers Racing	Chevrolet	4	0	suspension	0
32	27	63	Bayley Currey	Copp Motorsports	Chevrolet	3	0	engine	5
Official race results

Previous race: 2018 Eldora Dirt Derby	NASCAR Camping World Truck Series; 2018 season	Next race: 2018 Corrigan Oil 200
