= 2018 Corrigan Oil 200 =

15th race of the 2018 NASCAR Camping World Truck Series

Race details
- Race 15 of 23 of the 2018 NASCAR Camping World Truck Series
- Date: August 11, 2018
- Official name: 19th Annual Corrigan Oil 200
- Location: Brooklyn, Michigan, Michigan International Speedway
- Course: Permanent racing facility
- Course length: 2 miles (3.2 km)
- Distance: 100 laps, 200 mi (321.868 km)
- Scheduled distance: 100 laps, 200 mi (321.868 km)
- Average speed: 130.175 miles per hour (209.496 km/h)

Pole position
| Driver | John Hunter Nemechek | NEMCO Motorsports |
- Time: 39.121

Most laps led
| Driver | Noah Gragson; Matt Crafton | Kyle Busch Motorsports; ThorSport Racing |
- Laps: 18

Winner
| No. 16 | Brett Moffitt | Hattori Racing Enterprises |

Television in the United States
- Network: Fox Sports 1
- Announcers: Vince Welch, Phil Parsons, Michael Waltrip

Radio in the United States
- Radio: Motor Racing Network

The 2018 Corrigan Oil 200 was the 15th stock car race of the 2018 NASCAR Camping World Truck Series season and the 19th iteration of the event. The race was held on Saturday, August 11, 2018, in Brooklyn, Michigan at Michigan International Speedway, a two-mile (3.2 km) permanent moderate-banked D-shaped speedway. The race took the scheduled 100 laps to complete. In a photo finish, Hattori Racing Enterprises driver Brett Moffitt would edge out eventual second-place finisher Johnny Sauter of GMS Racing by 0.025 seconds to win his fifth career NASCAR Camping World Truck Series win and his fourth win of the season. To fill out the podium, John Hunter Nemechek of NEMCO Motorsports finished third.

== Background ==
The layout of Michigan International Speedway, the venue where the race was held.

The race was held at Michigan International Speedway, a two-mile (3.2 km) moderate-banked D-shaped speedway located in Brooklyn, Michigan. The track is used primarily for NASCAR events. It is known as a "sister track" to Texas World Speedway as MIS's oval design was a direct basis of TWS, with moderate modifications to the banking in the corners, and was used as the basis of Auto Club Speedway. The track is owned by International Speedway Corporation. Michigan International Speedway is recognized as one of motorsports' premier facilities because of its wide racing surface and high banking (by open-wheel standards; the 18-degree banking is modest by stock car standards).

=== Entry list ===
| # | Driver | Team | Make | Sponsor |
|---|---|---|---|---|
| 0 | Camden Murphy | Jennifer Jo Cobb Racing | Chevrolet | Jennifer Jo Cobb Racing |
| 2 | Cody Coughlin | GMS Racing | Chevrolet | JEGS |
| 02 | Austin Hill | Young's Motorsports | Chevrolet | Randco, Young's Building Systems |
| 3 | Jordan Anderson | Jordan Anderson Racing | Chevrolet | Bommarito Automotive Group, SponsorJordan.com |
| 4 | Todd Gilliland | Kyle Busch Motorsports | Toyota | Mobil 1 |
| 6 | Norm Benning | Norm Benning Racing | Chevrolet | Norm Benning Racing |
| 7 | Korbin Forrister | All Out Motorsports | Toyota | All Out Motorsports |
| 8 | John Hunter Nemechek | NEMCO Motorsports | Chevrolet | Business Machines Company |
| 10 | Jennifer Jo Cobb | Jennifer Jo Cobb Racing | Chevrolet | Driven2Honor.org |
| 13 | Myatt Snider | ThorSport Racing | Ford | Century Container |
| 15 | Todd Peck | Premium Motorsports | Chevrolet | VIP Racing Experience |
| 16 | Brett Moffitt | Hattori Racing Enterprises | Toyota | Aisin, Hino Motors |
| 17 | Bo LeMastus | DGR-Crosley | Toyota | Crosley Brands |
| 18 | Noah Gragson | Kyle Busch Motorsports | Toyota | Safelite Auto Glass |
| 20 | Tate Fogleman | Young's Motorsports | Chevrolet | Randco |
| 21 | Johnny Sauter | GMS Racing | Chevrolet | ISM Connect |
| 22 | Austin Wayne Self | Niece Motorsports | Chevrolet | AM Technical Solutions, GO TEXAN. "Don't Mess With Texas" |
| 24 | Justin Haley | GMS Racing | Chevrolet | Fraternal Order of Eagles |
| 25 | Dalton Sargeant | GMS Racing | Chevrolet | Performance Plus Motor Oil |
| 33 | Josh Reaume | Reaume Brothers Racing | Chevrolet | Lodestar Guidance |
| 34 | B. J. McLeod | Reaume Brothers Racing | Chevrolet | Reaume Brothers Racing |
| 41 | Ben Rhodes | ThorSport Racing | Ford | The Carolina Nut Company |
| 45 | Justin Fontaine | Niece Motorsports | Chevrolet | ProMatic Automation |
| 49 | Wendell Chavous | Premium Motorsports | Chevrolet | SobrietyNation.org |
| 50 | Reed Sorenson | Beaver Motorsports | Chevrolet | SobrietyNation.org |
| 51 | Spencer Davis | Kyle Busch Motorsports | Toyota | JBL |
| 52 | Stewart Friesen | Halmar Friesen Racing | Chevrolet | Halmar "We Build America" |
| 54 | Matt Mills | DGR-Crosley | Toyota | J.F. Electric |
| 63 | Timmy Hill | MB Motorsports | Chevrolet | MB Motorsports |
| 74 | ?* | Mike Harmon Racing | Chevrolet | |
| 83 | Bayley Currey | Copp Motorsports | Chevrolet | Nutriblade |
| 87 | Joe Nemechek | NEMCO Motorsports | Chevrolet | D. A. B. Constructors, Inc. |
| 88 | Matt Crafton | ThorSport Racing | Ford | Menards, Hormel Black Label Bacon |
| 98 | Grant Enfinger | ThorSport Racing | Ford | Champion Power Equipment "Powering Your Life." |
Official entry list

*Withdrew.

== Practice ==
=== First practice ===
The first practice session was held on Friday, August 10, at 1:05 PM EST, and would last for 50 minutes. Noah Gragson of Kyle Busch Motorsports would set the fastest time in the session, with a lap of 38.456 and an average speed of 187.227 miles per hour (301.313 km/h).

| Pos. | # | Driver | Team | Make | Time | Speed |
|---|---|---|---|---|---|---|
| 1 | 18 | Noah Gragson | Kyle Busch Motorsports | Toyota | 38.456 | 187.227 |
| 2 | 88 | Matt Crafton | ThorSport Racing | Ford | 38.759 | 185.763 |
| 3 | 4 | Todd Gilliland | Kyle Busch Motorsports | Toyota | 38.797 | 185.581 |
Full first practice results

=== Second and final practice ===
The second and final practice session, sometimes known as Happy Hour, was held on Friday, August 10, at 3:05 PM EST, and would last for 50 minutes. Dalton Sargeant of GMS Racing would set the fastest time in the session, with a lap of 38.613 and an average speed of 186.466 miles per hour (300.088 km/h).

| Pos. | # | Driver | Team | Make | Time | Speed |
|---|---|---|---|---|---|---|
| 1 | 25 | Dalton Sargeant | GMS Racing | Chevrolet | 38.613 | 186.466 |
| 2 | 16 | Brett Moffitt | Hattori Racing Enterprises | Toyota | 38.641 | 186.331 |
| 3 | 88 | Matt Crafton | ThorSport Racing | Ford | 38.816 | 185.491 |
Full Happy Hour practice results

== Qualifying ==
Qualifying was held on Saturday, August 11, at 9:30 AM EST. Since Michigan International Speedway is at least 1.5 miles (2.4 km), the qualifying system was a single car, single lap, two round system where in the first round, everyone would set a time to determine positions 13–32. Then, the fastest 12 qualifiers would move on to the second round to determine positions 1–12.

John Hunter Nemechek of NEMCO Motorsports would win the pole, setting a lap of 39.121 and an average speed of 184.044 miles per hour (296.190 km/h) in the second round.

Camden Murphy would be the only driver to fail to qualify.

=== Full qualifying results ===
| Pos. | # | Driver | Team | Make | Time (R1) | Speed (R1) | Time (R2) | Speed (R2) |
|---|---|---|---|---|---|---|---|---|
| 1 | 8 | John Hunter Nemechek | NEMCO Motorsports | Chevrolet | | | 39.121 | 184.044 |
| 2 | 4 | Todd Gilliland | Kyle Busch Motorsports | Toyota | | | 39.122 | 184.040 |
| 3 | 18 | Noah Gragson | Kyle Busch Motorsports | Toyota | | | 39.167 | 183.828 |
| 4 | 54 | Matt Mills | DGR-Crosley | Toyota | | | 39.267 | 183.360 |
| 5 | 52 | Stewart Friesen | Halmar Friesen Racing | Chevrolet | | | 39.287 | 183.267 |
| 6 | 98 | Grant Enfinger | ThorSport Racing | Ford | | | 39.367 | 182.894 |
| 7 | 21 | Johnny Sauter | GMS Racing | Chevrolet | | | 39.385 | 182.811 |
| 8 | 13 | Myatt Snider | ThorSport Racing | Ford | | | 39.493 | 182.311 |
| 9 | 2 | Cody Coughlin | GMS Racing | Chevrolet | | | 39.537 | 182.108 |
| 10 | 02 | Austin Hill | Young's Motorsports | Chevrolet | | | 39.563 | 181.988 |
| 11 | 88 | Matt Crafton | ThorSport Racing | Ford | | | 39.629 | 181.685 |
| 12 | 51 | Spencer Davis | Kyle Busch Motorsports | Toyota | 39.568 | 181.965 | — | — |
Eliminated in Round 1
| 13 | 17 | Bo LeMastus | DGR-Crosley | Toyota | 39.641 | 181.630 | — | — |
| 14 | 20 | Tate Fogleman | Young's Motorsports | Chevrolet | 39.643 | 181.621 | — | — |
| 15 | 87 | Joe Nemechek | NEMCO Motorsports | Chevrolet | 39.667 | 181.511 | — | — |
| 16 | 25 | Dalton Sargeant | GMS Racing | Chevrolet | 39.693 | 181.392 | — | — |
| 17 | 41 | Ben Rhodes | ThorSport Racing | Ford | 39.702 | 181.351 | — | — |
| 18 | 3 | Jordan Anderson | Jordan Anderson Racing | Chevrolet | 39.742 | 181.169 | — | — |
| 19 | 45 | Justin Fontaine | Niece Motorsports | Chevrolet | 39.808 | 180.868 | — | — |
| 20 | 22 | Austin Wayne Self | Niece Motorsports | Chevrolet | 39.873 | 180.573 | — | — |
| 21 | 16 | Brett Moffitt | Hattori Racing Enterprises | Toyota | 39.887 | 180.510 | — | — |
| 22 | 24 | Justin Haley | GMS Racing | Chevrolet | 40.006 | 179.973 | — | — |
| 23 | 49 | Wendell Chavous | Premium Motorsports | Chevrolet | 40.098 | 179.560 | — | — |
| 24 | 7 | Korbin Forrister | All Out Motorsports | Toyota | 40.395 | 178.240 | — | — |
| 25 | 63 | Timmy Hill | MB Motorsports | Chevrolet | 40.653 | 177.109 | — | — |
| 26 | 10 | Jennifer Jo Cobb | Jennifer Jo Cobb Racing | Chevrolet | 40.778 | 176.566 | — | — |
| 27 | 34 | B. J. McLeod | Reaume Brothers Racing | Chevrolet | 40.793 | 176.501 | — | — |
Qualified by owner's points
| 28 | 50 | Reed Sorenson | Beaver Motorsports | Chevrolet | 40.909 | 176.000 | — | — |
| 29 | 15 | Todd Peck | Premium Motorsports | Chevrolet | 41.090 | 175.225 | — | — |
| 30 | 33 | Josh Reaume | Reaume Brothers Racing | Chevrolet | 42.177 | 170.709 | — | — |
| 31 | 6 | Norm Benning | Norm Benning Racing | Chevrolet | 42.419 | 169.735 | — | — |
| 32 | 83 | Bayley Currey | Copp Motorsports | Chevrolet | 43.483 | 165.582 | — | — |
Failed to qualify or withdrew
| 33 | 0 | Camden Murphy | Jennifer Jo Cobb Racing | Chevrolet | 41.137 | 175.025 | — | — |
| WD | 74 | ? | Mike Harmon Racing | Chevrolet | — | — | — | — |
Official starting lineup

== Race results ==
Stage 1 Laps: 20

| Pos. | # | Driver | Team | Make | Pts |
|---|---|---|---|---|---|
| 1 | 52 | Stewart Friesen | Halmar Friesen Racing | Chevrolet | 10 |
| 2 | 8 | John Hunter Nemechek | NEMCO Motorsports | Chevrolet | 0 |
| 3 | 4 | Todd Gilliland | Kyle Busch Motorsports | Toyota | 8 |
| 4 | 18 | Noah Gragson | Kyle Busch Motorsports | Toyota | 7 |
| 5 | 98 | Grant Enfinger | ThorSport Racing | Ford | 6 |
| 6 | 41 | Ben Rhodes | ThorSport Racing | Ford | 5 |
| 7 | 13 | Myatt Snider | ThorSport Racing | Ford | 4 |
| 8 | 21 | Johnny Sauter | GMS Racing | Chevrolet | 3 |
| 9 | 02 | Austin Hill | Young's Motorsports | Chevrolet | 2 |
| 10 | 2 | Cody Coughlin | GMS Racing | Chevrolet | 1 |

Stage 2 Laps: 20

| Pos. | # | Driver | Team | Make | Pts |
|---|---|---|---|---|---|
| 1 | 98 | Grant Enfinger | ThorSport Racing | Ford | 10 |
| 2 | 13 | Myatt Snider | ThorSport Racing | Ford | 9 |
| 3 | 16 | Brett Moffitt | Hattori Racing Enterprises | Toyota | 8 |
| 4 | 18 | Noah Gragson | Kyle Busch Motorsports | Toyota | 7 |
| 5 | 22 | Austin Wayne Self | Niece Motorsports | Chevrolet | 6 |
| 6 | 88 | Matt Crafton | ThorSport Racing | Ford | 5 |
| 7 | 24 | Justin Haley | GMS Racing | Chevrolet | 4 |
| 8 | 4 | Todd Gilliland | Kyle Busch Motorsports | Toyota | 3 |
| 9 | 52 | Stewart Friesen | Halmar Friesen Racing | Chevrolet | 2 |
| 10 | 25 | Dalton Sargeant | GMS Racing | Chevrolet | 1 |

Stage 3 Laps: 60

| Fin | St | # | Driver | Team | Make | Laps | Led | Status | Pts |
|---|---|---|---|---|---|---|---|---|---|
| 1 | 21 | 16 | Brett Moffitt | Hattori Racing Enterprises | Toyota | 100 | 5 | running | 48 |
| 2 | 7 | 21 | Johnny Sauter | GMS Racing | Chevrolet | 100 | 16 | running | 38 |
| 3 | 1 | 8 | John Hunter Nemechek | NEMCO Motorsports | Chevrolet | 100 | 6 | running | 0 |
| 4 | 3 | 18 | Noah Gragson | Kyle Busch Motorsports | Toyota | 100 | 18 | running | 47 |
| 5 | 2 | 4 | Todd Gilliland | Kyle Busch Motorsports | Toyota | 100 | 8 | running | 43 |
| 6 | 17 | 41 | Ben Rhodes | ThorSport Racing | Ford | 100 | 0 | running | 36 |
| 8 | 5 | 52 | Stewart Friesen | Halmar Friesen Racing | Chevrolet | 100 | 12 | running | 41 |
| 7 | 6 | 98 | Grant Enfinger | ThorSport Racing | Ford | 100 | 16 | running | 46 |
| 9 | 22 | 24 | Justin Haley | GMS Racing | Chevrolet | 100 | 0 | running | 32 |
| 10 | 11 | 88 | Matt Crafton | ThorSport Racing | Ford | 100 | 18 | running | 32 |
| 11 | 20 | 22 | Austin Wayne Self | Niece Motorsports | Chevrolet | 100 | 0 | running | 32 |
| 12 | 16 | 25 | Dalton Sargeant | GMS Racing | Chevrolet | 100 | 0 | running | 26 |
| 13 | 18 | 3 | Jordan Anderson | Jordan Anderson Racing | Chevrolet | 100 | 0 | running | 24 |
| 14 | 9 | 2 | Cody Coughlin | GMS Racing | Chevrolet | 100 | 0 | running | 24 |
| 15 | 14 | 20 | Tate Fogleman | Young's Motorsports | Chevrolet | 100 | 0 | running | 22 |
| 16 | 23 | 49 | Wendell Chavous | Premium Motorsports | Chevrolet | 100 | 1 | running | 21 |
| 17 | 13 | 17 | Bo LeMastus | DGR-Crosley | Toyota | 100 | 0 | running | 20 |
| 18 | 8 | 13 | Myatt Snider | ThorSport Racing | Ford | 99 | 0 | running | 32 |
| 19 | 10 | 02 | Austin Hill | Young's Motorsports | Chevrolet | 99 | 0 | running | 20 |
| 20 | 30 | 33 | Josh Reaume | Reaume Brothers Racing | Chevrolet | 99 | 0 | running | 17 |
| 21 | 31 | 6 | Norm Benning | Norm Benning Racing | Chevrolet | 97 | 0 | running | 16 |
| 22 | 12 | 51 | Spencer Davis | Kyle Busch Motorsports | Toyota | 95 | 0 | running | 15 |
| 23 | 26 | 10 | Jennifer Jo Cobb | Jennifer Jo Cobb Racing | Chevrolet | 95 | 0 | running | 14 |
| 24 | 24 | 7 | Korbin Forrister | All Out Motorsports | Toyota | 94 | 0 | electrical | 13 |
| 25 | 19 | 45 | Justin Fontaine | Niece Motorsports | Chevrolet | 94 | 0 | running | 12 |
| 26 | 29 | 15 | Todd Peck | Premium Motorsports | Chevrolet | 56 | 0 | overheating | 11 |
| 27 | 32 | 83 | Bayley Currey | Copp Motorsports | Chevrolet | 49 | 0 | electrical | 10 |
| 28 | 28 | 50 | Reed Sorenson | Beaver Motorsports | Chevrolet | 47 | 0 | electrical | 0 |
| 29 | 27 | 34 | B. J. McLeod | Reaume Brothers Racing | Chevrolet | 41 | 0 | fuel pump | 0 |
| 30 | 15 | 87 | Joe Nemechek | NEMCO Motorsports | Chevrolet | 33 | 0 | ignition | 7 |
| 31 | 4 | 54 | Matt Mills | DGR-Crosley | Toyota | 27 | 0 | crash | 0 |
| 32 | 25 | 63 | Timmy Hill | MB Motorsports | Chevrolet | 7 | 0 | suspension | 0 |
Failed to qualify
| 33 | | 0 | Camden Murphy | Jennifer Jo Cobb Racing | Chevrolet | | | | |
| WD | | 74 | ? | Mike Harmon Racing | Chevrolet | | | | |
Official race results

| Previous race: 2018 Gander Outdoors 150 | NASCAR Camping World Truck Series; 2018 season | Next race: 2018 UNOH 200 |
