= 2018 PPG 400 =

Race details
- Race 8 of 23 of the 2018 NASCAR Camping World Truck Series
- Date: June 8, 2018
- Official name: PPG 400
- Location: Fort Worth, Texas, Texas Motor Speedway
- Course: Permanent racing facility
- Course length: 1.5 miles (2.41 km)
- Distance: 167 laps, 250.5 mi (403.14 km)
- Scheduled distance: 167 laps, 250.5 mi (403.14 km)
- Average speed: 115.66 miles per hour (186.14 km/h)

Pole position
Driver	Stewart Friesen	Halmar Friesen Racing
- Time: 29.173

Most laps led
Driver	Todd Gilliland	Kyle Busch Motorsports
- Laps: 62

Winner
No. 21	Johnny Sauter	GMS Racing

Television in the United States
- Network: Fox Sports 1
- Announcers: Vince Welch, Phil Parsons, Todd Bodine

Radio in the United States
- Radio: Motor Racing Network

The 2018 PPG 400 was the eighth stock car race of the 2018 NASCAR Camping World Truck Series season and the 22nd iteration of the event. The race was held on Friday, June 8, 2018, in Fort Worth, Texas at Texas Motor Speedway, a 1.5 miles (2.4 km) permanent quad-oval racetrack. The race took the scheduled 167 laps to complete. At race's end, Johnny Sauter of GMS Racing would hold off Stewart Friesen to win the race, the 21st NASCAR Camping World Truck Series win of his career and the 4th of the season. To fill out the podium, Stewart Friesen of Halmar Friesen Racing and Justin Haley of GMS Racing finished 2nd and 3rd, respectively.

== Background ==
Texas Motor Speedway is a speedway located in the northernmost portion of the U.S. city of Fort Worth, Texas – the portion located in Denton County, Texas. The track measures 1.5 miles (2.4 km) around and is banked 24 degrees in the turns, and is of the oval design, where the front straightaway juts outward slightly. The track layout is similar to Atlanta Motor Speedway and Charlotte Motor Speedway (formerly Lowe's Motor Speedway). The track is owned by Speedway Motorsports, Inc., the same company that owns Atlanta and Charlotte Motor Speedway, as well as the short-track Bristol Motor Speedway.

=== Entry list ===
#	Driver	Team	Make	Sponsor
0	Camden Murphy	Jennifer Jo Cobb Racing	Chevrolet	Jennifer Jo Cobb Racing
2	Cody Coughlin	GMS Racing	Chevrolet	Jegs
02	Austin Hill	Young's Motorsports	Chevrolet	Ennis Steel Industries
3	Jordan Anderson	Jordan Anderson Racing	Chevrolet	Sefton Steel
4	Todd Gilliland	Kyle Busch Motorsports	Toyota	Mobil 1
6	Norm Benning	Norm Benning Racing	Chevrolet	Zomongo
7	Korbin Forrister	All Out Motorsports	Toyota	N. O. W. Matters More
8	Joe Nemechek	NEMCO Motorsports	Chevrolet	ROMCO Equipment
10	Jennifer Jo Cobb	Jennifer Jo Cobb Racing	Chevrolet	Driven2Honor.org
13	Myatt Snider	ThorSport Racing	Ford	The Carolina Nut Co.
15	Reed Sorenson	Premium Motorsports	Chevrolet	Sunwest Construction
16	Brett Moffitt	Hattori Racing Enterprises	Toyota	Northland Foundations
17	Bo LeMastus	DGR-Crosley	Toyota	Crosley Brands
18	Noah Gragson	Kyle Busch Motorsports	Toyota	Safelite Auto Glass
20	Tyler Young	Young's Motorsports	Chevrolet	FindARanch.com, Texas Rig Equipment
21	Johnny Sauter	GMS Racing	Chevrolet	ISM Connect Patriotic
22	Austin Wayne Self	Niece Motorsports	Chevrolet	AM Technical Solutions, GO TEXAN.
24	Justin Haley	GMS Racing	Chevrolet	Fraternal Order of Eagles Patriotic
25	Dalton Sargeant	GMS Racing	Chevrolet	Performance Plus Motor Oil
33	Josh Reaume	Reaume Brothers Racing	Toyota	Reaume Brothers Racing
41	Ben Rhodes	ThorSport Racing	Ford	Alpha Energy Solutions
45	Justin Fontaine	Niece Motorsports	Chevrolet	Promatic Automation
49	Wendell Chavous	Premium Motorsports	Chevrolet	SobrietyNation.org
50	Todd Peck	Beaver Motorsports	Chevrolet	Image Tech
51	Spencer Davis	Kyle Busch Motorsports	Toyota	SiriusXM, JBL
52	Stewart Friesen	Halmar Friesen Racing	Chevrolet	Halmar "We Build America"
54	Chris Eggleston	DGR-Crosley	Toyota	Globe Sprinkler
63	Kyle Donahue	Copp Motorsports	Chevrolet	Copp Motorsports
68	Clay Greenfield	Clay Greenfield Motorsports	Chevrolet	AMVETS #PLEASESTAND
74	Mike Harmon	Mike Harmon Racing	Chevrolet	Horizon Transport, Koolbox
83	Bayley Currey	Copp Motorsports	Chevrolet	Fr8Auctions, 20/30 Fasttrack
88	Matt Crafton	ThorSport Racing	Ford	pMenards, Matador
98	Grant Enfinger	ThorSport Racing	Ford	Protect the Harvest

== Practice ==
Initially, two practice sessions were scheduled for the event- however, second practice would be rained out, meaning that second practice was canceled.

=== First and final practice ===
The first and final practice took place on 3:05 PM CST. Chris Eggleston of DGR-Crosley would set the fastest time in practice with a 29.853 and an average speed of 180.886 miles per hour (291.108 km/h).

Pos.	#	Driver	Team	Make	Time	Speed
1	54	Chris Eggleston	DGR-Crosley	Toyota	29.853	180.886
2	18	Noah Gragson	Kyle Busch Motorsports	Toyota	29.909	180.548
3	21	Johnny Sauter	GMS Racing	Chevrolet	29.926	180.445
Full final practice results

== Qualifying ==
Qualifying would take place on Friday, June 8 on 4:45 CST. Since Texas Motor Speedway is at least a 1.5 miles (2.4 km) racetrack, the qualifying system was a single car, single lap, two round system where in the first round, everyone would set a time to determine positions 13–32. Then, the fastest 12 qualifiers would move on to the second round to determine positions 1–12.

Stewart Friesen of Halmar Friesen Racing would win the pole, advancing to Round 2 and setting the fastest time in Round 2 with a time of 29.173 and an average speed of 185.103 miles per hour (297.894 km/h). Mike Harmon of Mike Harmon Racing would be the only driver not to qualify.

Pos.	#	Driver	Team	Make	Time (R1)	Speed (R1)	Time (R2)	Speed (R2)
1	52	Stewart Friesen	Halmar Friesen Racing	Chevrolet			29.173	185.103
2	4	Todd Gilliland	Kyle Busch Motorsports	Toyota			29.197	184.951
3	18	Noah Gragson	Kyle Busch Motorsports	Toyota			29.227	184.761
4	51	Spencer Davis	Kyle Busch Motorsports	Toyota			29.271	184.483
5	21	Johnny Sauter	GMS Racing	Chevrolet			29.336	184.074
6	54	Chris Eggleston	DGR-Crosley	Toyota			29.355	183.955
7	16	Brett Moffitt	Hattori Racing Enterprises	Toyota			29.357	183.943
8	98	Grant Enfinger	ThorSport Racing	Ford			29.411	183.605
9	88	Matt Crafton	ThorSport Racing	Ford			29.448	183.374
10	24	Justin Haley	GMS Racing	Chevrolet			29.454	183.337
11	41	Ben Rhodes	ThorSport Racing	Ford			29.618	182.322
12	17	Bo LeMastus	DGR-Crosley	Toyota			30.495	177.078
Eliminated in Round 1
13	13	Myatt Snider	ThorSport Racing	Ford	29.861	180.838	—	—
14	2	Cody Coughlin	GMS Racing	Chevrolet	29.884	180.699	—	—
15	22	Austin Wayne Self	Niece Motorsports	Chevrolet	29.916	180.505	—	—
16	8	Joe Nemechek	NEMCO Motorsports	Chevrolet	30.010	179.940	—	—
17	3	Jordan Anderson	Jordan Anderson Racing	Chevrolet	30.037	179.778	—	—
18	45	Justin Fontaine	Niece Motorsports	Chevrolet	30.238	178.583	—	—
19	49	Wendell Chavous	Premium Motorsports	Chevrolet	30.548	176.771	—	—
20	20	Tyler Young	Young's Motorsports	Chevrolet	30.896	174.780	—	—
21	7	Korbin Forrister	All Out Motorsports	Toyota	31.335	172.331	—	—
22	02	Austin Hill	Young's Motorsports	Chevrolet	31.350	172.249	—	—
23	33	Josh Reaume	Reaume Brothers Racing	Toyota	31.388	172.040	—	—
24	0	Camden Murphy	Jennifer Jo Cobb Racing	Chevrolet	31.408	171.931	—	—
25	68	Clay Greenfield	Clay Greenfield Motorsports	Chevrolet	31.810	169.758	—	—
26	83	Bayley Currey	Copp Motorsports	Chevrolet	31.856	169.513	—	—
27	63	Kyle Donahue	Copp Motorsports	Chevrolet	31.992	168.792	—	—
Qualified by owner's points
28	25	Dalton Sargeant	GMS Racing	Chevrolet	32.493	166.190	—	—
29	15	Reed Sorenson	Premium Motorsports	Chevrolet	32.791	164.679	—	—
30	6	Norm Benning	Norm Benning Racing	Chevrolet	33.199	162.656	—	—
31	10	Jennifer Jo Cobb	Jennifer Jo Cobb Racing	Chevrolet	33.261	162.352	—	—
32	50	Todd Peck	Beaver Motorsports	Chevrolet	—	—	—	—
Failed to qualify
33	74	Mike Harmon	Mike Harmon Racing	Chevrolet	33.058	163.349	—	—
Official starting lineup

== Race results ==
Stage 1 Laps: 40

Fin	#	Driver	Team	Make	Pts
1	52	Stewart Friesen	Halmar Friesen Racing	Chevrolet	10
2	88	Matt Crafton	ThorSport Racing	Ford	9
3	13	Myatt Snider	ThorSport Racing	Ford	8
4	21	Johnny Sauter	GMS Racing	Chevrolet	7
5	2	Cody Coughlin	GMS Racing	Chevrolet	6
6	22	Austin Wayne Self	Niece Motorsports	Chevrolet	5
7	51	Spencer Davis	Kyle Busch Motorsports	Toyota	4
8	24	Justin Haley	GMS Racing	Chevrolet	3
9	4	Todd Gilliland	Kyle Busch Motorsports	Toyota	2
10	17	Bo LeMastus	DGR-Crosley	Toyota	1

Stage 2 Laps: 40

Fin	#	Driver	Team	Make	Pts
1	98	Grant Enfinger	ThorSport Racing	Ford	10
2	52	Stewart Friesen	Halmar Friesen Racing	Chevrolet	9
3	24	Justin Haley	GMS Racing	Chevrolet	8
4	02	Austin Hill	Young's Motorsports	Chevrolet	7
5	4	Todd Gilliland	Kyle Busch Motorsports	Toyota	6
6	18	Noah Gragson	Kyle Busch Motorsports	Toyota	5
7	20	Tyler Young	Young's Motorsports	Chevrolet	4
8	13	Myatt Snider	ThorSport Racing	Ford	3
9	21	Johnny Sauter	GMS Racing	Chevrolet	2
10	88	Matt Crafton	ThorSport Racing	Ford	1

Stage 3 Laps: 87

Fin	St	#	Driver	Team	Make	Laps	Led	Status	Pts
1	5	21	Johnny Sauter	GMS Racing	Chevrolet	167	51	running	49
2	1	52	Stewart Friesen	Halmar Friesen Racing	Chevrolet	167	13	running	54
3	10	24	Justin Haley	GMS Racing	Chevrolet	167	3	running	45
4	8	98	Grant Enfinger	ThorSport Racing	Ford	167	7	running	43
5	9	88	Matt Crafton	ThorSport Racing	Ford	167	0	running	42
6	2	4	Todd Gilliland	Kyle Busch Motorsports	Toyota	167	62	running	39
7	20	20	Tyler Young	Young's Motorsports	Chevrolet	167	0	running	35
8	14	2	Cody Coughlin	GMS Racing	Chevrolet	167	0	running	35
9	4	51	Spencer Davis	Kyle Busch Motorsports	Toyota	167	7	running	32
10	3	18	Noah Gragson	Kyle Busch Motorsports	Toyota	167	19	running	31
11	28	25	Dalton Sargeant	GMS Racing	Chevrolet	167	0	running	26
12	19	49	Wendell Chavous	Premium Motorsports	Chevrolet	167	0	running	25
13	22	02	Austin Hill	Young's Motorsports	Chevrolet	165	0	running	31
14	6	54	Chris Eggleston	DGR-Crosley	Toyota	165	4	running	23
15	16	8	Joe Nemechek	NEMCO Motorsports	Chevrolet	165	0	running	22
16	11	41	Ben Rhodes	ThorSport Racing	Ford	164	1	running	21
17	15	22	Austin Wayne Self	Niece Motorsports	Chevrolet	162	0	running	25
18	7	16	Brett Moffitt	Hattori Racing Enterprises	Toyota	158	0	running	19
19	17	3	Jordan Anderson	Jordan Anderson Racing	Chevrolet	157	0	oil cooler	18
20	25	68	Clay Greenfield	Clay Greenfield Motorsports	Chevrolet	157	0	running	17
21	30	6	Norm Benning	Norm Benning Racing	Chevrolet	157	0	running	16
22	21	7	Korbin Forrister	All Out Motorsports	Toyota	155	0	running	15
23	13	13	Myatt Snider	ThorSport Racing	Ford	105	0	crash	25
24	31	10	Jennifer Jo Cobb	Jennifer Jo Cobb Racing	Chevrolet	102	0	crash	13
25	23	33	Josh Reaume	Reaume Brothers Racing	Toyota	79	0	engine	12
26	12	17	Bo LeMastus	DGR-Crosley	Toyota	73	0	crash	12
27	29	15	Reed Sorenson	Premium Motorsports	Chevrolet	15	0	overheating	0
28	27	63	Kyle Donahue	Copp Motorsports	Chevrolet	13	0	overheating	9
29	26	83	Bayley Currey	Copp Motorsports	Chevrolet	11	0	crash	8
30	18	45	Justin Fontaine	Niece Motorsports	Chevrolet	6	0	crash	7
31	24	0	Camden Murphy	Jennifer Jo Cobb Racing	Chevrolet	4	0	electrical	6
32	32	50	Todd Peck	Beaver Motorsports	Chevrolet	1	0	electrical	5
Failed to qualify
33		74	Mike Harmon	Mike Harmon Racing	Chevrolet				

Previous race: 2018 North Carolina Education Lottery 200	NASCAR Camping World Truck Series; 2018 season	Next race: 2018 M&M's 200
