= 2019 Pocono Green 250 =

NASCAR race

Race details
- Race 12 of 33 in the 2019 NASCAR Xfinity Series season
- Date: June 1, 2019
- Location: Pocono Raceway in Long Pond, Pennsylvania
- Course: Permanent racing facility
- Course length: 2.5 miles (4 km)
- Distance: 103 laps, 250 mi (400 km)

Pole position
Driver	Cole Custer	Stewart-Haas Racing with Biagi-DenBeste Racing
- Time: 52.722

Most laps led
Driver	Cole Custer	Stewart-Haas Racing with Biagi-DenBeste Racing
- Laps: 58

Winner
No. 00	Cole Custer	Stewart-Haas Racing with Biagi-DenBeste Racing

Television in the United States
- Network: FS1

Radio in the United States
- Radio: MRN

The 2019 Pocono Green 250 is a NASCAR Xfinity Series race held on June 1, 2019, at Pocono Raceway in Long Pond, Pennsylvania. Contested over 103 laps (extended from 100 laps due to an overtime finish) on the 2.5-mile (4.0 km) triangular racecourse, it was the 12th race of the 2019 NASCAR Xfinity Series season.

== Background ==
=== Track ===
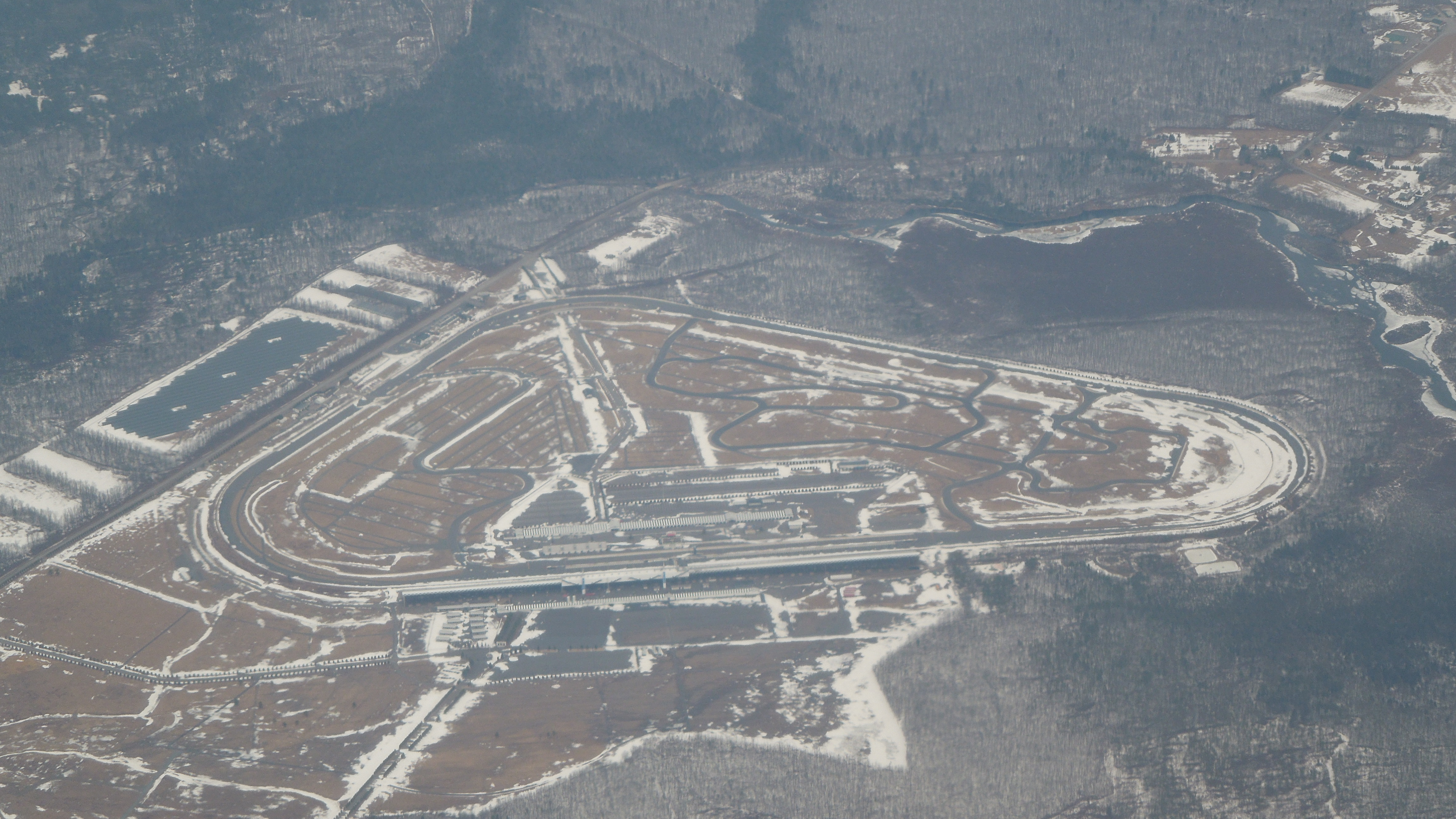
Pocono Raceway, the track where the race was held.

The race was held at Pocono Raceway which is located in the Pocono Mountains in Long Pond, Pennsylvania. It is the site of two annual Monster Energy NASCAR Cup Series races held several weeks apart in early June and late July, one NASCAR Xfinity Series event in early June, one NASCAR Gander Outdoors Truck Series event in late July, and two ARCA Racing Series events, one in early June and the other in late July. From 1971 to 1989, and since 2013, the track has also hosted an Indy Car race, currently sanctioned by the IndyCar Series and run in August.

== Entry list ==
No.	Driver	Team	Manufacturer
00	Cole Custer	Stewart-Haas Racing with Biagi-DenBeste Racing	Ford
0	Garrett Smithley	JD Motorsports	Chevrolet
01	Stephen Leicht	JD Motorsports	Chevrolet
1	Michael Annett	JR Motorsports	Chevrolet
2	Tyler Reddick	Richard Childress Racing	Chevrolet
4	Ross Chastain	JD Motorsports	Chevrolet
5	Matt Mills (R)	B. J. McLeod Motorsports	Toyota
07	Ray Black Jr.	SS-Green Light Racing	Chevrolet
7	Justin Allgaier	JR Motorsports	Chevrolet
08	Gray Gaulding (R)	SS-Green Light Racing	Chevrolet
8	Ryan Preece (i)	JR Motorsports	Chevrolet
9	Noah Gragson (R)	JR Motorsports	Chevrolet
10	Austin Dillon (i)	Kaulig Racing	Chevrolet
11	Justin Haley (R)	Kaulig Racing	Chevrolet
13	John Jackson	MBM Motorsports	Toyota
15	B. J. McLeod	JD Motorsports	Chevrolet
17	Camden Murphy (i)	Rick Ware Racing	Chevrolet
18	Jeffrey Earnhardt	Joe Gibbs Racing	Toyota
19	Brandon Jones	Joe Gibbs Racing	Toyota
20	Christopher Bell	Joe Gibbs Racing	Toyota
22	Austin Cindric	Team Penske	Ford
23	John Hunter Nemechek (R)	GMS Racing	Chevrolet
35	Joey Gase	MBM Motorsports	Toyota
36	Josh Williams	DGM Racing	Chevrolet
38	Jeff Green	RSS Racing	Chevrolet
39	Ryan Sieg	RSS Racing	Chevrolet
42	Chad Finchum	MBM Motorsports	Toyota
51	Jeremy Clements	Jeremy Clements Racing	Chevrolet
52	David Starr	Jimmy Means Racing	Chevrolet
66	Timmy Hill	MBM Motorsports	Toyota
74	Mike Harmon	Mike Harmon Racing	Chevrolet
78	Vinnie Miller	B. J. McLeod Motorsports	Chevrolet
86	Brandon Brown	Brandonbilt Motorsports	Chevrolet
89	Morgan Shepherd	Shepherd Racing Ventures	Chevrolet
90	Ronnie Bassett Jr. (R)	DGM Racing	Chevrolet
93	Josh Bilicki	RSS Racing	Chevrolet
98	Chase Briscoe (R)	Stewart-Haas Racing with Biagi-DenBeste Racing	Ford
99	Todd Peck (i)	B. J. McLeod Motorsports	Chevrolet

- Initially No. 5 from Matt Mills was a Chevrolet but he crashed the car in Practice, so they ran the backup car that was a Toyota.

== Practice ==
=== First practice ===
Tyler Reddick was the fastest in the first practice session with a time of 53.388 seconds and a speed of 168.577 mph (271.298 km/h).

Pos	No.	Driver	Team	Manufacturer	Time	Speed
1	2	Tyler Reddick	Richard Childress Racing	Chevrolet	53.388	168.577
2	00	Cole Custer	Stewart-Haas Racing with Biagi-DenBeste Racing	Ford	53.780	167.348
3	20	Christopher Bell	Joe Gibbs Racing	Toyota	53.868	167.075

=== Final practice ===
Cole Custer was the fastest in the final practice session with a time of 53.134 seconds and a speed of 169.383 mph (272.596 km/h).

Pos	No.	Driver	Team	Manufacturer	Time	Speed
1	00	Cole Custer	Stewart-Haas Racing with Biagi-DenBeste Racing	Ford	53.134	169.383
2	2	Tyler Reddick	Richard Childress Racing	Chevrolet	53.234	169.065
3	20	Christopher Bell	Joe Gibbs Racing	Toyota	53.489	168.259

== Qualifying ==
Cole Custer scored the pole for the race with a time of 52.722 seconds and a speed of 170.707 mph (274.726 km/h).

=== Qualifying results ===
Pos	No	Driver	Team	Manufacturer	Time
1	00	Cole Custer	Stewart-Haas Racing with Biagi-DenBeste Racing	Ford	52.722
2	20	Christopher Bell	Joe Gibbs Racing	Toyota	52.730
3	22	Austin Cindric	Team Penske	Ford	52.896
4	1	Michael Annett	JR Motorsports	Chevrolet	53.219
5	39	Ryan Sieg	RSS Racing	Chevrolet	53.241
6	2	Tyler Reddick	Richard Childress Racing	Chevrolet	53.274
7	19	Brandon Jones	Joe Gibbs Racing	Toyota	53.278
8	8	Ryan Preece (i)	JR Motorsports	Chevrolet	53.304
9	7	Justin Allgaier	JR Motorsports	Chevrolet	53.459
10	18	Jeffrey Earnhardt	Joe Gibbs Racing	Toyota	53.492
11	10	Austin Dillon (i)	Kaulig Racing	Chevrolet	53.517
12	98	Chase Briscoe (R)	Stewart-Haas Racing with Biagi-DenBeste Racing	Ford	53.522
13	11	Justin Haley (R)	Kaulig Racing	Chevrolet	53.825
14	4	Ross Chastain	JD Motorsports	Chevrolet	53.929
15	9	Noah Gragson (R)	JR Motorsports	Chevrolet	53.947
16	15	B. J. McLeod	JD Motorsports	Chevrolet	54.209
17	07	Ray Black Jr.	SS-Green Light Racing	Chevrolet	54.417
18	08	Gray Gaulding (R)	SS-Green Light Racing	Chevrolet	54.591
19	35	Joey Gase	MBM Motorsports	Toyota	54.624
20	93	Josh Bilicki	RSS Racing	Chevrolet	54.718
21	66	Timmy Hill	MBM Motorsports	Toyota	54.727
22	36	Josh Williams	DGM Racing	Chevrolet	54.768
23	23	John Hunter Nemechek (R)	GMS Racing	Chevrolet	54.792
24	38	Jeff Green	RSS Racing	Chevrolet	54.807
25	01	Stephen Leicht	JD Motorsports	Chevrolet	54.895
26	42	Chad Finchum	MBM Motorsports	Toyota	54.897
27	86	Brandon Brown (R)	Brandonbilt Motorsports	Chevrolet	54.961
28	51	Jeremy Clements	Jeremy Clements Racing	Chevrolet	54.963
29	17	Camden Murphy (i)	Rick Ware Racing	Chevrolet	55.176
30	90	Ronnie Bassett Jr. (R)	DGM Racing	Chevrolet	55.305
31	52	David Starr	Jimmy Means Racing	Chevrolet	55.776
32	99	Todd Peck (i)	B. J. McLeod Motorsports	Chevrolet	56.171
33	78	Vinnie Miller	B. J. McLeod Motorsports	Chevrolet	56.586
34	0	Garrett Smithley	JD Motorsports	Chevrolet	56.725
35	74	Mike Harmon	Mike Harmon Racing	Chevrolet	57.629
36	13	John Jackson	MBM Motorsports	Toyota	58.450
37	89	Morgan Shepherd	Shepherd Racing Ventures	Chevrolet	60.244
38	5	Matt Mills (R)	B. J. McLeod Motorsports	Toyota	60.474

- Tyler Reddick and John Hunter Nemechek started from the rear due to transmission failure and starting on a backup car, respectively.

== Race ==
=== Summary ===
Cole Custer started on pole and led from green flag to the end of stage 1. Brandon Jones spun out early, slamming the back of his car into the fence on turn 1. Joey Gase, Chad Finchum, and Todd Peck all got together exiting the first turn afterwards, and Christopher Bell spun out but managed to save it.

Bell led for a few laps before Justin Allgaier passed him to win stage 2. Allgaier would later lose the lead after Custer passed him the same way he passed Bell in turn 1. Jeffrey Earnhardt spun out after being tapped by Austin Cindric.

Tyler Reddick passed Custer after the final restart, leading a lap. On the final turn, Custer managed to slip by Reddick (who got loose) and held him off to win the race.

=== Stage Results ===
Stage One Laps: 25

Pos	No	Driver	Team	Manufacturer	Points
1	00	Cole Custer	Stewart-Haas Racing with Biagi-DenBeste	Ford	10
2	7	Justin Allgaier	JR Motorsports	Chevrolet	9
3	2	Tyler Reddick	Richard Childress Racing	Chevrolet	8
4	10	Austin Dillon (i)	Kaulig Racing	Chevrolet	0
5	22	Austin Cindric	Team Penske	Ford	6
6	11	Justin Haley (R)	Kaulig Racing	Chevrolet	5
7	4	Ross Chastain	JD Motorsports	Chevrolet	4
8	39	Ryan Sieg	RSS Racing	Chevrolet	3
9	23	John Hunter Nemechek (R)	GMS Racing	Chevrolet	2
10	9	Noah Gragson (R)	JR Motorsports	Chevrolet	1

Stage Two Laps: 25

Pos	No	Driver	Team	Manufacturer	Points
1	7	Justin Allgaier	JR Motorsports	Chevrolet	10
2	2	Tyler Reddick	Richard Childress Racing	Chevrolet	9
3	20	Christopher Bell	Joe Gibbs Racing	Toyota	8
4	98	Chase Briscoe (R)	Stewart-Haas Racing with Biagi-DenBeste	Ford	7
5	00	Cole Custer	Stewart-Haas Racing with Biagi-DenBeste	Ford	6
6	22	Austin Cindric	Team Penske	Ford	5
7	1	Michael Annett	JR Motorsports	Chevrolet	4
8	23	John Hunter Nemechek (R)	GMS Racing	Chevrolet	3
9	11	Justin Haley (R)	Kaulig Racing	Chevrolet	2
10	8	Ryan Preece (i)	JR Motorsports	Chevrolet	0

=== Final Stage Results ===
Stage Three Laps: 50

Pos	Grid	No	Driver	Team	Manufacturer	Laps	Points
1	1	00	Cole Custer	Stewart-Haas Racing with Biagi-DenBeste	Ford	103	56
2	6	2	Tyler Reddick	Richard Childress Racing	Chevrolet	103	52
3	12	98	Chase Briscoe (R)	Stewart-Haas Racing with Biagi-DenBeste	Ford	103	41
4	8	8	Ryan Preece (i)	JR Motorsports	Chevrolet	103	0
5	2	20	Christopher Bell	Joe Gibbs Racing	Toyota	103	40
6	15	9	Noah Gragson (R)	JR Motorsports	Chevrolet	103	32
7	3	22	Austin Cindric	Team Penske	Ford	103	41
8	4	1	Michael Annett	JR Motorsports	Chevrolet	103	33
9	13	11	Justin Haley (R)	Kaulig Racing	Chevrolet	103	35
10	11	10	Austin Dillon (i)	Kaulig Racing	Chevrolet	103	0
11	9	7	Justin Allgaier	JR Motorsports	Chevrolet	103	45
12	23	23	John Hunter Nemechek (R)	GMS Racing	Chevrolet	103	30
13	27	86	Brandon Brown (R)	Brandonbilt Motorsports	Chevrolet	103	24
14	14	4	Ross Chastain	JD Motorsports	Chevrolet	103	27
15	22	36	Josh Williams (R)	DGM Racing	Chevrolet	103	22
16	28	51	Jeremy Clements	Jeremy Clements Racing	Chevrolet	102	21
17	16	15	B. J. McLeod	JD Motorsports	Chevrolet	102	20
18	17	07	Ray Black Jr.	SS-Green Light Racing	Chevrolet	102	19
19	21	66	Timmy Hill	MBM Motorsports	Toyota	102	18
20	18	08	Gray Gaulding	SS-Green Light Racing	Chevrolet	102	17
21	30	90	Ronnie Bassett Jr.	DGM Racing	Chevrolet	102	16
22	10	18	Jeffrey Earnhardt	Joe Gibbs Racing	Toyota	102	15
23	25	01	Stephen Leicht (R)	JD Motorsports	Chevrolet	102	14
24	31	52	David Starr	Jimmy Means Racing	Chevrolet	101	13
25	33	78	Vinnie Miller	B. J. McLeod Motorsports	Chevrolet	101	12
26	5	39	Ryan Sieg	RSS Racing	Chevrolet	100	14
27	32	99	Todd Peck (i)	B. J. McLeod Motorsports	Chevrolet	100	0
28	35	74	Mike Harmon	Mike Harmon Racing	Chevrolet	99	9
29	34	0	Garrett Smithley	JD Motorsports	Chevrolet	86	8
30	38	5	Matt Mills (R)	B. J. McLeod Motorsports	Toyota	65	7
31	36	13	John Jackson	MBM Motorsports	Toyota	36	6
32	29	17	Camden Murphy (i)	Rick Ware Racing	Chevrolet	36	0
33	19	35	Joey Gase	MBM Motorsports	Toyota	34	4
34	20	93	Josh Bilicki	RSS Racing	Chevrolet	33	3
35	37	89	Morgan Shepherd	Shepherd Racing Ventures	Chevrolet	31	2
36	24	38	Jeff Green	RSS Racing	Chevrolet	22	1
37	26	42	Chad Finchum	MBM Motorsports	Toyota	10	1
38	7	19	Brandon Jones	Joe Gibbs Racing	Toyota	6	1

Previous race: 2019 Alsco 300 (Charlotte)	NASCAR Xfinity Series; 2019 season	Next race: 2019 LTi Printing 250
