= 2023 NextEra Energy 250 =

1st race of the 2023 NASCAR Craftsman Truck Series

Race details
- Race 1 of 23 of the 2023 NASCAR Craftsman Truck Series
- Date: February 17, 2023
- Official name: 24th Annual NextEra Energy 250
- Location: Daytona International Speedway, Daytona Beach, Florida
- Course: Permanent racing facility
- Course length: 2.5 miles (4.0 km)
- Distance: 79 laps, 197 mi (317 km)
- Scheduled distance: 100 laps, 250 mi (402 km)
- Average speed: 115.935 mph (186.579 km/h)

Pole position
Driver	Nick Sanchez	Rev Racing
- Time: 49.478

Most laps led
Driver	Corey LaJoie; Christian Eckes	Spire Motorsports; McAnally–Hilgemann Racing
- Laps: 19

Winner
No. 38	Zane Smith	Front Row Motorsports

Television in the United States
- Network: FS1
- Announcers: Adam Alexander, Phil Parsons, and Michael Waltrip

Radio in the United States
- Radio: MRN

The 2023 NextEra Energy 250 was the 1st stock car race of the 2023 NASCAR Craftsman Truck Series, and the 24th iteration of the event. The race was held on Friday, February 17, 2023, in Daytona Beach, Florida, at Daytona International Speedway, a 2.5 miles (4.0 km) permanent tri-oval shaped superspeedway. The race was scheduled to be contested over 100 laps, but was shortened to 79 laps due to rain. Zane Smith, the reigning winner of the race, driving for Front Row Motorsports, would win the race after leading when the final caution came out for rain. This was Smith's eighth career NASCAR Craftsman Truck Series win, and his first of the season. To fill out the podium, Tanner Gray, driving for Tricon Garage, and Christian Eckes, driving for McAnally–Hilgemann Racing, would finish 2nd and 3rd, respectively.

== Background ==
Daytona International Speedway is one of three superspeedways to hold NASCAR races, the other two being Atlanta Motor Speedway and Talladega Superspeedway. The standard track at Daytona International Speedway is a four-turn superspeedway that is 2.5 miles (4.0 km) long. The track's turns are banked at 31 degrees, while the front stretch, the location of the finish line, is banked at 18 degrees.

=== Entry list ===
- (R) denotes rookie driver.
- (i) denotes driver who is ineligible for series driver points.

#	Driver	Team	Make
1	Jason A. White	Tricon Garage	Toyota
02	Kris Wright	Young's Motorsports	Chevrolet
2	Nick Sanchez (R)	Rev Racing	Chevrolet
04	Kaden Honeycutt	Roper Racing	Ford
4	Chase Purdy	Kyle Busch Motorsports	Chevrolet
5	Dean Thompson	Tricon Garage	Ford
7	Corey LaJoie (i)	Spire Motorsports	Chevrolet
9	Colby Howard	CR7 Motorsports	Chevrolet
11	Corey Heim	Tricon Garage	Toyota
12	Spencer Boyd	Young's Motorsports	Chevrolet
13	Hailie Deegan	ThorSport Racing	Ford
15	Tanner Gray	Tricon Garage	Toyota
16	Tyler Ankrum	Hattori Racing Enterprises	Toyota
17	Sammy Smith (i)	Tricon Garage	Toyota
19	Christian Eckes	McAnally–Hilgemann Racing	Chevrolet
20	Derek Kraus	Young's Motorsports	Chevrolet
22	Josh Reaume	AM Racing	Ford
23	Grant Enfinger	GMS Racing	Chevrolet
24	Rajah Caruth (R)	GMS Racing	Chevrolet
25	Matt DiBenedetto	Rackley W.A.R.	Chevrolet
28	Bryan Dauzat	FDNY Racing	Chevrolet
30	Chris Hacker	On Point Motorsports	Toyota
32	Bret Holmes (R)	Bret Holmes Racing	Chevrolet
33	Mason Massey	Reaume Brothers Racing	Ford
34	Jason M. White	Reaume Brothers Racing	Toyota
35	Chase Elliott (i)	McAnally–Hilgemann Racing	Chevrolet
38	Zane Smith	Front Row Motorsports	Ford
41	Travis Pastrana (i)	Niece Motorsports	Chevrolet
42	Carson Hocevar	Niece Motorsports	Chevrolet
43	Daniel Dye (R)	GMS Racing	Chevrolet
45	Lawless Alan	Niece Motorsports	Chevrolet
46	Norm Benning	G2G Racing	Toyota
51	Jack Wood	Kyle Busch Motorsports	Chevrolet
52	Stewart Friesen	Halmar Friesen Racing	Toyota
56	Timmy Hill	Hill Motorsports	Toyota
75	Parker Kligerman (i)	Henderson Motorsports	Chevrolet
84	Clay Greenfield	Cook Racing Technologies	Toyota
88	Matt Crafton	ThorSport Racing	Ford
96	Todd Peck	Peck Motorsports	Toyota
97	Codie Rohrbaugh	CR7 Motorsports	Chevrolet
98	Ty Majeski	ThorSport Racing	Ford
99	Ben Rhodes	ThorSport Racing	Ford
Official entry list

== Practice ==
The first and only practice session was held on Thursday, February 16, at 5:05 PM EST, and would last for 50 minutes. Rajah Caruth, driving for GMS Racing, would set the fastest time in the session, with a lap of 47.760, and an average speed of 188.442 mph (303.268 km/h).

Pos.	#	Driver	Team	Make	Time	Speed
1	24	Rajah Caruth (R)	GMS Racing	Chevrolet	47.760	188.442
2	19	Christian Eckes	McAnally–Hilgemann Racing	Chevrolet	47.774	188.387
3	51	Jack Wood	Kyle Busch Motorsports	Chevrolet	47.924	187.797
Full practice results

== Qualifying ==
Qualifying was held on Friday, February 17, at 3:00 PM EST. Since Daytona International Speedway is a superspeedway, the qualifying system used is a single-car, single-lap system with two rounds. In the first round, drivers have one lap to set a time. The fastest ten drivers from the first round move on to the second round. Whoever sets the fastest time in Round 2 wins the pole.

Nick Sanchez, driving for Rev Racing, would win the pole after advancing from the preliminary round and setting the fastest lap in Round 2, with a lap of 49.478, and an average speed of 181.899 mph (292.738 km/h).

Six drivers would fail to qualify: Lawless Alan, Bryan Dauzat, Todd Peck, Spencer Boyd, Kaden Honeycutt, and Norm Benning.

Pos.	#	Driver	Team	Make	Time (R1)	Speed (R1)	Time (R2)	Speed (R2)
1	2	Nick Sanchez (R)	Rev Racing	Chevrolet	49.731	180.974	49.478	181.899
2	98	Ty Majeski	ThorSport Racing	Ford	50.083	179.702	49.783	180.785
3	51	Jack Wood	Kyle Busch Motorsports	Chevrolet	50.000	180.000	49.969	180.112
4	19	Christian Eckes	McAnally–Hilgemann Racing	Chevrolet	49.991	180.032	50.085	179.695
5	7	Corey LaJoie (i)	Spire Motorsports	Chevrolet	50.292	178.955	50.228	179.183
6	88	Matt Crafton	ThorSport Racing	Ford	50.397	178.582	50.289	178.966
7	1	Jason A. White	Tricon Garage	Toyota	50.391	178.603	50.300	178.926
8	25	Matt DiBenedetto	Rackley W.A.R.	Chevrolet	50.404	178.557	50.398	178.579
9	42	Carson Hocevar	Niece Motorsports	Chevrolet	50.462	178.352	50.412	178.529
10	4	Chase Purdy	Kyle Busch Motorsports	Chevrolet	49.757	180.879	—	—
Eliminated in Round 1
11	20	Derek Kraus	Young's Motorsports	Chevrolet	50.462	178.352	—	—
12	13	Hailie Deegan	ThorSport Racing	Ford	50.466	178.338	—	—
13	11	Corey Heim	Tricon Garage	Toyota	50.519	178.151	—	—
14	35	Chase Elliott (i)	McAnally–Hilgemann Racing	Chevrolet	50.528	178.119	—	—
15	38	Zane Smith	Front Row Motorsports	Ford	50.552	178.034	—	—
16	23	Grant Enfinger	GMS Racing	Chevrolet	50.559	178.010	—	—
17	24	Rajah Caruth (R)	GMS Racing	Chevrolet	50.621	177.792	—	—
18	5	Dean Thompson	Tricon Garage	Toyota	50.645	177.708	—	—
19	15	Tanner Gray	Tricon Garage	Toyota	50.680	177.585	—	—
20	17	Sammy Smith (i)	Tricon Garage	Toyota	50.686	177.564	—	—
21	9	Colby Howard	CR7 Motorsports	Chevrolet	50.695	177.532	—	—
22	32	Bret Holmes (R)	Bret Holmes Racing	Chevrolet	50.707	177.490	—	—
23	52	Stewart Friesen	Halmar Friesen Racing	Toyota	50.710	177.480	—	—
24	75	Parker Kligerman (i)	Henderson Motorsports	Chevrolet	50.716	177.459	—	—
25	41	Travis Pastrana (i)	Niece Motorsports	Chevrolet	50.732	177.403	—	—
26	99	Ben Rhodes	ThorSport Racing	Ford	50.862	176.949	—	—
27	16	Tyler Ankrum	Hattori Racing Enterprises	Toyota	51.010	176.436	—	—
28	97	Codie Rohrbaugh	CR7 Motorsports	Chevrolet	51.044	176.318	—	—
29	43	Daniel Dye (R)	GMS Racing	Chevrolet	51.088	176.167	—	—
30	02	Kris Wright	Young's Motorsports	Chevrolet	51.173	175.874	—	—
31	84	Clay Greenfield	Cook Racing Technologies	Toyota	51.202	175.774	—	—
Qualified by owner's points
32	56	Timmy Hill	Hill Motorsports	Toyota	51.244	175.630	—	—
33	30	Chris Hacker	On Point Motorsports	Toyota	51.246	175.623	—	—
34	22	Josh Reaume	AM Racing	Ford	52.525	171.347	—	—
35	33	Mason Massey	Reaume Brothers Racing	Ford	52.587	171.145	—	—
36	34	Jason M. White	Reaume Brothers Racing	Toyota	54.081	166.417	—	—
Failed to qualify
37	45	Lawless Alan	Niece Motorsports	Chevrolet	51.208	175.754	—	—
38	28	Bryan Dauzat	FDNY Racing	Chevrolet	51.287	175.483	—	—
39	96	Todd Peck	Peck Motorsports	Toyota	51.288	175.480	—	—
40	12	Spencer Boyd	Young's Motorsports	Chevrolet	51.489	174.795	—	—
41	04	Kaden Honeycutt	Roper Racing	Ford	51.516	174.703	—	—
42	46	Norm Benning	G2G Racing	Toyota	51.583	174.476	—	—
Official qualifying results
Official starting lineup

== Race results ==
Stage 1 Laps: 20

Pos.	#	Driver	Team	Make	Pts
1	19	Christian Eckes	McAnally–Hilgemann Racing	Chevrolet	10
2	88	Matt Crafton	ThorSport Racing	Ford	9
3	25	Matt DiBenedetto	Rackley W.A.R.	Chevrolet	8
4	13	Hailie Deegan	ThorSport Racing	Ford	7
5	2	Nick Sanchez (R)	Rev Racing	Chevrolet	6
6	98	Ty Majeski	ThorSport Racing	Ford	5
7	42	Carson Hocevar	Niece Motorsports	Chevrolet	4
8	15	Tanner Gray	Tricon Garage	Toyota	3
9	51	Jack Wood	Kyle Busch Motorsports	Chevrolet	2
10	23	Grant Enfinger	GMS Racing	Chevrolet	1

Stage 2 Laps: 20

Pos.	#	Driver	Team	Make	Pts
1	16	Tyler Ankrum	Hattori Racing Enterprises	Toyota	10
2	4	Chase Purdy	Kyle Busch Motorsports	Chevrolet	9
3	88	Matt Crafton	ThorSport Racing	Ford	8
4	2	Nick Sanchez (R)	Rev Racing	Chevrolet	7
5	19	Christian Eckes	McAnally–Hilgemann Racing	Chevrolet	6
6	98	Ty Majeski	ThorSport Racing	Ford	5
7	99	Ben Rhodes	ThorSport Racing	Ford	4
8	23	Grant Enfinger	GMS Racing	Chevrolet	3
9	51	Jack Wood	Kyle Busch Motorsports	Chevrolet	2
10	42	Carson Hocevar	Niece Motorsports	Chevrolet	1

Stage 3 Laps: 39

Fin	St	#	Driver	Team	Make	Laps	Led	Status	Pts
1	15	38	Zane Smith	Front Row Motorsports	Ford	79	17	Running	40
2	19	15	Tanner Gray	Tricon Garage	Toyota	79	0	Running	38
3	4	19	Christian Eckes	McAnally–Hilgemann Racing	Chevrolet	79	19	Running	50
4	21	9	Colby Howard	CR7 Motorsports	Chevrolet	79	2	Running	33
5	16	23	Grant Enfinger	GMS Racing	Chevrolet	79	0	Running	36
6	2	98	Ty Majeski	ThorSport Racing	Ford	79	2	Running	41
7	27	16	Tyler Ankrum	Hattori Racing Enterprises	Toyota	79	15	Running	40
8	13	11	Corey Heim	Tricon Garage	Toyota	79	0	Running	29
9	6	88	Matt Crafton	ThorSport Racing	Ford	79	2	Running	45
10	14	35	Chase Elliott (i)	McAnally–Hilgemann Racing	Chevrolet	79	0	Running	0
11	26	99	Ben Rhodes	ThorSport Racing	Ford	79	0	Running	30
12	9	42	Carson Hocevar	Niece Motorsports	Chevrolet	79	0	Running	30
13	25	41	Travis Pastrana (i)	Niece Motorsports	Chevrolet	79	0	Running	0
14	20	17	Sammy Smith (i)	Tricon Garage	Toyota	79	0	Running	0
15	7	1	Jason A. White	Tricon Garage	Toyota	79	0	Running	22
16	32	56	Timmy Hill	Hill Motorsports	Toyota	79	0	Running	21
17	10	4	Chase Purdy	Kyle Busch Motorsports	Chevrolet	79	1	Running	29
18	11	20	Derek Kraus	Young's Motorsports	Chevrolet	79	0	Running	19
19	34	22	Josh Reaume	AM Racing	Ford	79	0	Running	18
20	8	25	Matt DiBenedetto	Rackley W.A.R.	Chevrolet	79	0	Running	25
21	36	34	Jason M. White	Reaume Brothers Racing	Toyota	79	0	Running	16
22	30	02	Kris Wright	Young's Motorsports	Chevrolet	79	0	Running	15
23	5	7	Corey LaJoie (i)	Spire Motorsports	Chevrolet	79	19	Running	0
24	35	33	Mason Massey	Reaume Brothers Racing	Ford	79	0	Running	13
25	33	30	Chris Hacker	On Point Motorsports	Toyota	79	0	Running	12
26	1	2	Nick Sanchez (R)	Rev Racing	Chevrolet	79	0	Running	24
27	3	51	Jack Wood	Kyle Busch Motorsports	Chevrolet	79	0	Running	14
28	23	52	Stewart Friesen	Halmar Friesen Racing	Toyota	74	2	Running	9
29	17	24	Rajah Caruth (R)	GMS Racing	Chevrolet	57	0	Accident	8
30	29	43	Daniel Dye (R)	GMS Racing	Chevrolet	57	0	Accident	7
31	22	32	Bret Holmes (R)	Bret Holmes Racing	Chevrolet	49	0	Brakes	6
32	24	75	Parker Kligerman (i)	Henderson Motorsports	Chevrolet	45	0	DVP	0
33	28	97	Codie Rohrbaugh	CR7 Motorsports	Chevrolet	39	0	Accident	4
34	31	84	Clay Greenfield	Cook Racing Technologies	Toyota	28	0	Accident	3
35	12	13	Hailie Deegan	ThorSport Racing	Ford	28	0	Accident	2
36	18	5	Dean Thompson	Tricon Garage	Toyota	28	0	Accident	1
Official race results

== Standings after the race ==
Drivers' Championship standings

Pos	Driver	Points
1	Christian Eckes	50
2	Matt Crafton	45 (-5)
3	Ty Majeski	41 (-9)
4	Zane Smith	40 (-10)
5	Tyler Ankrum	40 (-10)
6	Tanner Gray	38 (-12)
7	Grant Enfinger	36 (-14)
8	Colby Howard	33 (-17)
9	Ben Rhodes	30 (-20)
10	Carson Hocevar	30 (-20)
Official driver's standings

- Note: Only the first 10 positions are included for the driver standings.

Previous race: 2022 Lucas Oil 150	NASCAR Craftsman Truck Series; 2023 season	Next race: 2023 Victoria's Voice Foundation 200
