= Glenville, Pennsylvania =

Unincorporated community in Pennsylvania, U.S.

Coordinates: 39°45′25″N 76°48′55″W

Glenville is an unincorporated community in Manheim Township, York County, Pennsylvania, United States.

== Notable people ==
- Donora Hillard, author
- Todd Peck, NASCAR driver
