= 2019 Sport Clips Haircuts VFW 200 =

Race details
- Race 24 of 33 in the 2019 NASCAR Xfinity Series season
- Date: August 31, 2019
- Location: Darlington Raceway in Darlington, South Carolina
- Course: Permanent racing facility
- Course length: 1.366 miles (2.198 km)
- Distance: 147 laps, 200 mi (323 km)

Pole position
Driver	Ryan Blaney	Team Penske
- Time: 28.696

Most laps led
Driver	Tyler Reddick	Richard Childress Racing
- Laps: 70

Winner
No. 00	Cole Custer	Stewart-Haas Racing with Biagi-DenBeste

Television in the United States
- Network: NBC

Radio in the United States
- Radio: MRN

The 2019 Sport Clips Haircuts VFW 200 is a NASCAR Xfinity Series race held on August 31, 2019, at Darlington Raceway in Darlington, South Carolina. Contested over 147 laps on the 1.366-mile (2.198 km) egg-shaped oval, it was the 24th race of the 2019 NASCAR Xfinity Series season.

== Background ==
=== Track ===
Layout of Darlington Raceway, the track where the race was held.

Darlington Raceway is a race track built for NASCAR racing located near Darlington, South Carolina. It is nicknamed "The Lady in Black" and "The Track Too Tough to Tame" by many NASCAR fans and drivers and advertised as "A NASCAR Tradition." It is of a unique, somewhat egg-shaped design, an oval with the ends of very different configurations, a condition which supposedly arose from the proximity of one end of the track to a minnow pond the owner refused to relocate. This situation makes it very challenging for the crews to set up their cars' handling in a way that is effective at both ends.

== Entry list ==
The entry list included semi-retired driver Dale Earnhardt Jr., who decided to participate in the race despite being in a plane accident in mid-August 2019.

No.	Driver	Team	Manufacturer
00	Cole Custer	Stewart-Haas Racing with Biagi-DenBeste Racing	Ford
0	Garrett Smithley	JD Motorsports	Chevrolet
01	Landon Cassill	JD Motorsports	Chevrolet
1	Michael Annett	JR Motorsports	Chevrolet
2	Tyler Reddick	Richard Childress Racing	Chevrolet
4	B. J. McLeod	JD Motorsports	Chevrolet
5	Matt Mills	B. J. McLeod Motorsports	Chevrolet
07	Ray Black Jr.	SS-Green Light Racing	Chevrolet
7	Justin Allgaier	JR Motorsports	Chevrolet
08	Gray Gaulding (R)	SS-Green Light Racing	Chevrolet
8	Dale Earnhardt Jr.	JR Motorsports	Chevrolet
9	Noah Gragson (R)	JR Motorsports	Chevrolet
11	Justin Haley (R)	Kaulig Racing	Chevrolet
12	Ryan Blaney (i)	Team Penske	Ford
13	Tommy Joe Martins	MBM Motorsports	Toyota
15	Stephen Leicht	JD Motorsports	Chevrolet
17	Joe Nemechek (i)	Rick Ware Racing	Chevrolet
18	Denny Hamlin (i)	Joe Gibbs Racing	Toyota
19	Brandon Jones	Joe Gibbs Racing	Toyota
20	Christopher Bell	Joe Gibbs Racing	Toyota
22	Austin Cindric	Team Penske	Ford
23	John Hunter Nemechek (R)	GMS Racing	Chevrolet
35	Joey Gase	MBM Motorsports	Toyota
36	Josh Williams	DGM Racing	Chevrolet
38	J. J. Yeley	RSS Racing	Chevrolet
39	Ryan Sieg	RSS Racing	Chevrolet
51	Jeremy Clements	Jeremy Clements Racing	Chevrolet
52	David Starr	Jimmy Means Racing	Chevrolet
61	Chad Finchum	MBM Motorsports	Toyota
66	Timmy Hill	MBM Motorsports	Toyota
74	Mike Harmon	Mike Harmon Racing	Chevrolet
78	Vinnie Miller	B. J. McLeod Motorsports	Chevrolet
86	Brandon Brown (R)	Brandonbilt Motorsports	Chevrolet
89	Morgan Shepherd	Shepherd Racing Ventures	Chevrolet
90	Alex Labbé	DGM Racing	Chevrolet
93	Camden Murphy	RSS Racing	Chevrolet
98	Chase Briscoe (R)	Stewart-Haas Racing with Biagi-DenBeste Racing	Ford
99	Stefan Parsons	B. J. McLeod Motorsports	Toyota

== Practice ==
=== First practice ===
Cole Custer was the fastest in the first practice session with a time of 29.340 seconds and a speed of 167.607 mph (269.737 km/h).

Pos	No.	Driver	Team	Manufacturer	Time	Speed
1	00	Cole Custer	Stewart-Haas Racing with Biagi-DenBeste Racing	Ford	29.340	167.607
2	18	Denny Hamlin (i)	Joe Gibbs Racing	Toyota	29.381	167.373
3	7	Justin Allgaier	JR Motorsports	Chevrolet	29.423	167.135

=== Final practice ===
Noah Gragson was the fastest in the final practice session with a time of 29.575 seconds and a speed of 166.276 mph (267.595 km/h).

Pos	No.	Driver	Team	Manufacturer	Time	Speed
1	9	Noah Gragson (R)	JR Motorsports	Chevrolet	29.575	166.276
2	7	Justin Allgaier	JR Motorsports	Chevrolet	29.673	165.726
3	20	Christopher Bell	Joe Gibbs Racing	Toyota	29.704	165.553

== Qualifying ==
Ryan Blaney scored the pole for the race with a time of 28.696 seconds and a speed of 171.369 mph (275.792 km/h).

=== Qualifying results ===
Pos	No	Driver	Team	Manufacturer	Time
1	12	Ryan Blaney (i)	Team Penske	Ford	28.696
2	20	Christopher Bell	Joe Gibbs Racing	Toyota	28.828
3	00	Cole Custer	Stewart-Haas Racing with Biagi-DenBeste Racing	Ford	28.874
4	7	Justin Allgaier	JR Motorsports	Chevrolet	28.928
5	98	Chase Briscoe (R)	Stewart-Haas Racing with Biagi-DenBeste Racing	Ford	28.955
6	2	Tyler Reddick	Richard Childress Racing	Chevrolet	29.020
7	19	Brandon Jones	Joe Gibbs Racing	Toyota	29.077
8	9	Noah Gragson (R)	JR Motorsports	Chevrolet	29.098
9	22	Austin Cindric	Team Penske	Ford	29.162
10	1	Michael Annett	JR Motorsports	Chevrolet	29.178
11	01	Landon Cassill	JD Motorsports	Chevrolet	29.178
12	11	Justin Haley (R)	Kaulig Racing	Chevrolet	29.241
13	39	Ryan Sieg	RSS Racing	Chevrolet	29.441
14	8	Dale Earnhardt Jr.	JR Motorsports	Chevrolet	29.453
15	08	Gray Gaulding (R)	SS-Green Light Racing	Chevrolet	29.636
16	23	John Hunter Nemechek (R)	GMS Racing	Chevrolet	29.641
17	90	Alex Labbé	DGM Racing	Chevrolet	29.726
18	07	Ray Black Jr.	SS-Green Light Racing	Chevrolet	29.799
19	86	Brandon Brown (R)	Brandonbilt Motorsports	Chevrolet	29.874
20	51	Jeremy Clements	Jeremy Clements Racing	Chevrolet	29.879
21	99	Stefan Parsons	B. J. McLeod Motorsports	Toyota	29.966
22	93	Camden Murphy	RSS Racing	Chevrolet	30.037
23	4	B. J. McLeod	JD Motorsports	Chevrolet	30.113
24	15	Stephen Leicht	JD Motorsports	Chevrolet	30.121
25	17	Joe Nemechek (i)	Rick Ware Racing	Chevrolet	30.229
26	35	Joey Gase	MBM Motorsports	Toyota	30.248
27	66	Timmy Hill	MBM Motorsports	Toyota	30.317
28	36	Josh Williams	DGM Racing	Chevrolet	30.405
29	0	Garrett Smithley	JD Motorsports	Chevrolet	30.468
30	38	J. J. Yeley	RSS Racing	Chevrolet	30.823
31	61	Chad Finchum	MBM Motorsports	Toyota	31.055
32	13	Tommy Joe Martins	MBM Motorsports	Toyota	31.109
33	52	David Starr	Jimmy Means Racing	Chevrolet	31.163
34	5	Matt Mills	B. J. McLeod Motorsports	Chevrolet	31.419
35	74	Mike Harmon	Mike Harmon Racing	Chevrolet	31.654
36	78	Vinnie Miller	B. J. McLeod Motorsports	Chevrolet	32.130
37	18	Denny Hamlin (i)	Joe Gibbs Racing	Toyota	39.102
38	89	Morgan Shepherd	Shepherd Racing Ventures	Chevrolet	42.078

== Race ==
=== Summary ===
Ryan Blaney started on pole and led early, holding off Tyler Reddick. After John Hunter Nemechek spun and caused a caution, Blaney pitted and gave the lead to Reddick, who won Stage 1. After Brandon Brown spun and hit the inside wall, Blaney and Justin Allgaier caught up to Reddick, with Blaney taking the Stage 2 victory. Allgaier and Cole Custer battled Reddick for top positions, while Denny Hamlin (who started at the rear of the field) caught up to the top 5.

Blaney left pit road with Custer and Hamlin behind him. Hamlin got by Custer and then slid past Blaney for the lead with 27 remaining. The final caution occurred with around 15 laps remaining, stacking up the field. Hamlin stayed in the lead while Custer took the second position. The restart happened with 10 laps to go. Hamlin took off and retained the lead, while Custer chased him closely.

On the final lap, Custer got right up to Hamlin's back and dove into turn 3. Custer was unable to make it stick, causing Hamlin to cross the finish line in first place and take the apparent victory. Although Hamlin was later disqualified, which gave Custer the race win despite him not leading a single lap.

=== Stage Results ===
Stage One Laps: 45

Pos	No	Driver	Team	Manufacturer	Points
1	2	Tyler Reddick	Richard Childress Racing	Chevrolet	10
2	12	Ryan Blaney (i)	Team Penske	Ford	0
3	20	Christopher Bell	Joe Gibbs Racing	Toyota	8
4	98	Chase Briscoe (R)	Stewart-Haas Racing with Biagi-DenBeste	Ford	7
5	7	Justin Allgaier	JR Motorsports	Chevrolet	6
6	00	Cole Custer	Stewart-Haas Racing with Biagi-DenBeste	Ford	5
7	8	Dale Earnhardt Jr.	JR Motorsports	Chevrolet	4
8	19	Brandon Jones	Joe Gibbs Racing	Toyota	3
9	11	Justin Haley (R)	Kaulig Racing	Chevrolet	2
10	01	Landon Cassill	JD Motorsports	Chevrolet	1

Stage Two Laps: 45

Pos	No	Driver	Team	Manufacturer	Points
1	12	Ryan Blaney (i)	Team Penske	Ford	0
2	7	Justin Allgaier	JR Motorsports	Chevrolet	9
3	2	Tyler Reddick	Richard Childress Racing	Chevrolet	8
4	00	Cole Custer	Stewart-Haas Racing with Biagi-DenBeste	Ford	7
5	20	Christopher Bell	Joe Gibbs Racing	Toyota	6
6	8	Dale Earnhardt Jr.	JR Motorsports	Chevrolet	5
7	98	Chase Briscoe (R)	Stewart-Haas Racing with Biagi-DenBeste	Ford	4
8	19	Brandon Jones	Joe Gibbs Racing	Toyota	3
9	22	Austin Cindric	Team Penske	Ford	2
10	9	Noah Gragson (R)	JR Motorsports	Chevrolet	1

=== Final Stage Results ===
Stage Three Laps: 57

Pos	Grid	No	Driver	Team	Manufacturer	Laps	Points
1	3	00	Cole Custer	Stewart-Haas Racing with Biagi-DenBeste	Ford	147	52
2	6	2	Tyler Reddick	Richard Childress Racing	Chevrolet	147	53
3	1	12	Ryan Blaney (i)	Team Penske	Ford	147	0
4	2	20	Christopher Bell	Joe Gibbs Racing	Toyota	147	47
5	14	8	Dale Earnhardt Jr.	JR Motorsports	Chevrolet	147	41
6	5	98	Chase Briscoe (R)	Stewart-Haas Racing with Biagi-DenBeste	Ford	147	42
7	7	19	Brandon Jones	Joe Gibbs Racing	Toyota	147	36
8	8	9	Noah Gragson (R)	JR Motorsports	Chevrolet	147	30
9	4	7	Justin Allgaier	JR Motorsports	Chevrolet	147	43
10	9	22	Austin Cindric	Team Penske	Ford	147	29
11	12	11	Justin Haley (R)	Kaulig Racing	Chevrolet	147	28
12	20	51	Jeremy Clements	Jeremy Clements Racing	Chevrolet	147	25
13	10	1	Michael Annett	JR Motorsports	Chevrolet	147	24
14	13	39	Ryan Sieg	RSS Racing	Chevrolet	147	23
15	15	08	Gray Gaulding	SS-Green Light Racing	Chevrolet	147	22
16	18	07	Ray Black Jr.	SS-Green Light Racing	Chevrolet	147	21
17	17	90	Alex Labbé	DGM Racing	Chevrolet	147	20
18	11	01	Landon Cassill	JD Motorsports	Chevrolet	147	20
19	23	4	B. J. McLeod	JD Motorsports	Chevrolet	147	18
20	22	93	Camden Murphy	RSS Racing	Chevrolet	146	17
21	16	23	John Hunter Nemechek (R)	GMS Racing	Chevrolet	146	16
22	21	99	Stefan Parsons	B. J. McLeod Motorsports	Toyota	146	15
23	27	66	Timmy Hill	MBM Motorsports	Toyota	146	14
24	28	36	Josh Williams	DGM Racing	Chevrolet	144	13
25	26	35	Joey Gase	MBM Motorsports	Toyota	144	12
26	24	15	Stephen Leicht	JD Motorsports	Chevrolet	144	11
27	33	52	David Starr	Jimmy Means Racing	Chevrolet	144	10
28	36	78	Vinnie Miller	B. J. McLeod Motorsports	Chevrolet	143	9
29	29	0	Garrett Smithley	JD Motorsports	Chevrolet	143	8
30	33	61	Chad Finchum	MBM Motorsports	Toyota	133	7
31	34	5	Matt Mills	B. J. McLeod Motorsports	Chevrolet	128	6
32	35	74	Mike Harmon	Mike Harmon Racing	Chevrolet	114	5
33	19	86	Brandon Brown (R)	Brandonbilt Motorsports	Chevrolet	85	4
34	25	17	Joe Nemechek (i)	Rick Ware Racing	Chevrolet	72	0
35	32	13	Tommy Joe Martins	MBM Motorsports	Toyota	61	2
36	30	38	J. J. Yeley	RSS Racing	Chevrolet	34	1
37	38	89	Morgan Shepherd	Shepherd Racing Ventures	Chevrolet	27	1
38	37	18	Denny Hamlin (i)	Joe Gibbs Racing	Toyota	147	0

== After the race ==
Denny Hamlin was disqualified and stripped of his race win when his car failed a pair of height requirements, being deemed too low in the left front and too high in the right rear, ultimately giving the race win to runner-up Cole Custer. This was the first disqualification of an Xfinity Series race winner and the fourth overall disqualification in the Xfinity Series this season since the 2019 rules were established.

Previous race: 2019 CTECH Manufacturing 180	NASCAR Xfinity Series; 2019 season	Next race: 2019 Indiana 250
