= 2021 CRC Brakleen 150 =

Race details
- Race 13 of 22 of the 2021 NASCAR Camping World Truck Series
- Date: June 26, 2021
- Official name: CRC Brakleen 150
- Location: Long Pond, Pennsylvania, Pocono Raceway
- Course: Permanent racing facility
- Course length: 2.5 miles (4.0 km)
- Distance: 60 laps, 150 mi (241.38 km)
- Average speed: 122.310 miles per hour (196.839 km/h)

Pole position
Driver	Todd Gilliland	Front Row Motorsports
- Grid positions set by competition-based formula

Most laps led
Driver	Kyle Busch	Kyle Busch Motorsports
- Laps: 20

Winner
No. 4	John Hunter Nemechek	Kyle Busch Motorsports

Television in the United States
- Network: Fox Sports 1
- Announcers: Vince Welch and Phil Parsons

Radio in the United States
- Radio: Motor Racing Network

The 2021 CRC Brakleen 150 was the 13th stock car race of the 2021 NASCAR Camping World Truck Series season and the 12th iteration of the event. The race was held on Saturday, June 26, 2021, in Long Pond, Pennsylvania at Pocono Raceway, a 2.5 miles (4.0 km) permanent triangular racetrack. The race took 60 laps to complete. John Hunter Nemechek of Kyle Busch Motorsports would be able to hold off his boss Kyle Busch to win his 5th win of the season and 11th ever career win in the NASCAR Camping World Truck Series. Kyle Busch, driving for his own team Kyle Busch Motorsports and Sheldon Creed of GMS Racing would score the rest of the podium positions, scoring 2nd and 3rd, respectively.

== Background ==
The layout of Pocono Raceway, the venue where the race was held.

=== Entry list ===
#	Driver	Team	Make
1	Hailie Deegan	David Gilliland Racing	Ford
2	Sheldon Creed	GMS Racing	Chevrolet
02	Kris Wright	Young's Motorsports	Chevrolet
3	Howie DiSavino III	Jordan Anderson Racing	Chevrolet
4	John Hunter Nemechek	Kyle Busch Motorsports	Toyota
6	Norm Benning	Norm Benning Racing	Chevrolet
9	Grant Enfinger	CR7 Motorsports	Chevrolet
10	Jennifer Jo Cobb	Jennifer Jo Cobb Racing	Ford
12	Tate Fogleman	Young's Motorsports	Chevrolet
13	Johnny Sauter	ThorSport Racing	Toyota
15	Tanner Gray	David Gilliland Racing	Ford
16	Austin Hill	Hattori Racing Enterprises	Toyota
17	Ryan Preece	David Gilliland Racing	Ford
18	Chandler Smith	Kyle Busch Motorsports	Toyota
19	Derek Kraus	McAnally–Hilgemann Racing	Toyota
20	Spencer Boyd	Young's Motorsports	Chevrolet
21	Zane Smith	GMS Racing	Chevrolet
22	Austin Wayne Self	AM Racing	Chevrolet
23	Chase Purdy	GMS Racing	Chevrolet
24	Jack Wood	GMS Racing	Chevrolet
25	Josh Berry	Rackley W.A.R.	Chevrolet
26	Tyler Ankrum	GMS Racing	Chevrolet
28	Bryan Dauzat	FDNY Racing	Chevrolet
30	Danny Bohn	On Point Motorsports	Toyota
33	Josh Reaume	Reaume Brothers Racing	Chevrolet
34	Lawless Alan	Reaume Brothers Racing	Toyota
38	Todd Gilliland	Front Row Motorsports	Ford
40	Ryan Truex	Niece Motorsports	Chevrolet
41	Todd Peck	Cram Racing Enterprises	Chevrolet
42	Carson Hocevar	Niece Motorsports	Chevrolet
45	Bayley Currey	Niece Motorsports	Chevrolet
49	Ray Ciccarelli	CMI Motorsports	Toyota
51	Kyle Busch	Kyle Busch Motorsports	Toyota
52	Stewart Friesen	Halmar Friesen Racing	Toyota
56	Tyler Hill	Hill Motorsports	Chevrolet
66	Ty Majeski	ThorSport Racing	Toyota
88	Matt Crafton	ThorSport Racing	Toyota
98	Christian Eckes	ThorSport Racing	Toyota
99	Ben Rhodes	ThorSport Racing	Toyota
Official entry list

== Starting lineup ==
Qualifying was set by a metric qualifying system based on the previous race, the 2021 Rackley Roofing 200 and owner's points. As a result, Todd Gilliland of Front Row Motorsports would win the pole.

Pos.	#	Driver	Team	Make
1	38	Todd Gilliland	Front Row Motorsports	Ford
2	21	Zane Smith	GMS Racing	Chevrolet
3	99	Ben Rhodes	ThorSport Racing	Toyota
4	16	Austin Hill	Hattori Racing Enterprises	Toyota
5	88	Matt Crafton	ThorSport Racing	Toyota
6	52	Stewart Friesen	Halmar Friesen Racing	Toyota
7	4	John Hunter Nemechek	Kyle Busch Motorsports	Toyota
8	17	Ryan Preece	David Gilliland Racing	Ford
9	24	Jack Wood	GMS Racing	Chevrolet
10	2	Sheldon Creed	GMS Racing	Chevrolet
11	18	Chandler Smith	Kyle Busch Motorsports	Toyota
12	13	Johnny Sauter	ThorSport Racing	Toyota
13	42	Carson Hocevar	Niece Motorsports	Chevrolet
14	66	Ty Majeski	ThorSport Racing	Toyota
15	23	Chase Purdy	GMS Racing	Chevrolet
16	98	Christian Eckes	ThorSport Racing	Toyota
17	15	Tanner Gray	David Gilliland Racing	Ford
18	26	Tyler Ankrum	GMS Racing	Chevrolet
19	1	Hailie Deegan	David Gilliland Racing	Ford
20	25	Josh Berry	Rackley W.A.R.	Chevrolet
21	22	Austin Wayne Self	AM Racing	Chevrolet
22	51	Kyle Busch	Kyle Busch Motorsports	Toyota
23	40	Ryan Truex	Niece Motorsports	Chevrolet
24	19	Derek Kraus	McAnally–Hilgemann Racing	Toyota
25	12	Tate Fogleman	Young's Motorsports	Chevrolet
26	02	Kris Wright	Young's Motorsports	Chevrolet
27	45	Bayley Currey	Niece Motorsports	Chevrolet
28	30	Danny Bohn	On Point Motorsports	Toyota
29	34	Lawless Alan	Reaume Brothers Racing	Toyota
30	56	Tyler Hill	Hill Motorsports	Chevrolet
31	9	Grant Enfinger	CR7 Motorsports	Chevrolet
32	41	Todd Peck	Cram Racing Enterprises	Chevrolet
33	3	Howie DiSavino III	Jordan Anderson Racing	Chevrolet
34	20	Spencer Boyd	Young's Motorsports	Chevrolet
35	33	Josh Reaume	Reaume Brothers Racing	Chevrolet
36	10	Jennifer Jo Cobb	Jennifer Jo Cobb Racing	Ford
37	6	Norm Benning	Norm Benning Racing	Chevrolet
38	49	Ray Ciccarelli	CMI Motorsports	Toyota
39	28	Bryan Dauzat	FDNY Racing	Chevrolet
Official starting lineup

== Race results ==
Stage 1 Laps: 15

Fin	#	Driver	Team	Make	Pts
1	21	Zane Smith	GMS Racing	Chevrolet	10
2	51	Kyle Busch	Kyle Busch Motorsports	Toyota	0
3	2	Sheldon Creed	GMS Racing	Chevrolet	8
4	38	Todd Gilliland	Front Row Motorsports	Ford	7
5	18	Chandler Smith	Kyle Busch Motorsports	Toyota	6
6	99	Ben Rhodes	ThorSport Racing	Toyota	5
7	52	Stewart Friesen	Halmar Friesen Racing	Toyota	4
8	16	Austin Hill	Hattori Racing Enterprises	Toyota	3
9	98	Christian Eckes	ThorSport Racing	Toyota	2
10	88	Matt Crafton	ThorSport Racing	Toyota	1

Stage 2 Laps: 15

Fin	#	Driver	Team	Make	Pts
1	4	John Hunter Nemechek	Kyle Busch Motorsports	Toyota	10
2	99	Ben Rhodes	ThorSport Racing	Toyota	9
3	52	Stewart Friesen	Halmar Friesen Racing	Toyota	8
4	16	Austin Hill	Hattori Racing Enterprises	Toyota	7
5	88	Matt Crafton	ThorSport Racing	Toyota	6
6	25	Josh Berry	Rackley W.A.R.	Chevrolet	0
7	66	Ty Majeski	ThorSport Racing	Toyota	4
8	23	Chase Purdy	GMS Racing	Chevrolet	3
9	9	Grant Enfinger	CR7 Motorsports	Chevrolet	2
10	02	Kris Wright	Young's Motorsports	Chevrolet	1

Stage 3 Laps: 30

Fin	St	#	Driver	Team	Make	Laps	Led	Status	Pts
1	7	4	John Hunter Nemechek	Kyle Busch Motorsports	Toyota	60	12	running	50
2	22	51	Kyle Busch	Kyle Busch Motorsports	Toyota	60	20	running	0
3	10	2	Sheldon Creed	GMS Racing	Chevrolet	60	3	running	42
4	18	26	Tyler Ankrum	GMS Racing	Chevrolet	60	0	running	33
5	4	16	Austin Hill	Hattori Racing Enterprises	Toyota	60	0	running	42
6	5	88	Matt Crafton	ThorSport Racing	Toyota	60	0	running	38
7	1	38	Todd Gilliland	Front Row Motorsports	Ford	60	4	running	37
8	2	21	Zane Smith	GMS Racing	Chevrolet	60	18	running	39
9	8	17	Ryan Preece	David Gilliland Racing	Ford	60	0	running	0
10	24	19	Derek Kraus	McAnally–Hilgemann Racing	Toyota	60	0	running	27
11	20	25	Josh Berry	Rackley W.A.R.	Chevrolet	60	0	running	0
12	16	98	Christian Eckes	ThorSport Racing	Toyota	60	0	running	27
13	13	42	Carson Hocevar	Niece Motorsports	Chevrolet	60	0	running	24
14	14	66	Ty Majeski	ThorSport Racing	Toyota	60	0	running	27
15	15	23	Chase Purdy	GMS Racing	Chevrolet	60	0	running	25
16	17	15	Tanner Gray	David Gilliland Racing	Ford	60	0	running	21
17	3	99	Ben Rhodes	ThorSport Racing	Toyota	60	2	running	34
18	23	40	Ryan Truex	Niece Motorsports	Chevrolet	60	0	running	19
19	21	22	Austin Wayne Self	AM Racing	Chevrolet	60	0	running	18
20	29	34	Lawless Alan	Reaume Brothers Racing	Toyota	60	0	running	17
21	25	12	Tate Fogleman	Young's Motorsports	Chevrolet	60	0	running	16
22	33	3	Howie DiSavino III	Jordan Anderson Racing	Chevrolet	60	0	running	15
23	38	49	Ray Ciccarelli	CMI Motorsports	Toyota	60	0	running	14
24	30	56	Tyler Hill	Hill Motorsports	Chevrolet	60	0	running	13
25	11	18	Chandler Smith	Kyle Busch Motorsports	Toyota	59	0	running	18
26	19	1	Hailie Deegan	David Gilliland Racing	Ford	59	0	running	11
27	34	20	Spencer Boyd	Young's Motorsports	Chevrolet	59	0	running	10
28	35	33	Josh Reaume	Reaume Brothers Racing	Chevrolet	59	0	running	9
29	32	41	Todd Peck	Cram Racing Enterprises	Chevrolet	59	1	running	8
30	26	02	Kris Wright	Young's Motorsports	Chevrolet	59	0	running	8
31	36	10	Jennifer Jo Cobb	Jennifer Jo Cobb Racing	Ford	58	0	running	6
32	37	6	Norm Benning	Norm Benning Racing	Chevrolet	58	0	running	5
33	6	52	Stewart Friesen	Halmar Friesen Racing	Toyota	58	0	running	16
34	39	28	Bryan Dauzat	FDNY Racing	Chevrolet	57	0	running	3
35	12	13	Johnny Sauter	ThorSport Racing	Toyota	55	0	running	2
36	31	9	Grant Enfinger	CR7 Motorsports	Chevrolet	52	0	engine	3
37	27	45	Bayley Currey	Niece Motorsports	Chevrolet	38	0	engine	1
38	28	30	Danny Bohn	On Point Motorsports	Toyota	17	0	transmission	1
39	9	24	Jack Wood	GMS Racing	Chevrolet	0	0	accident	1
Official race results

Previous race: 2021 Rackley Roofing 200	NASCAR Camping World Truck Series; 2021 season	Next race: 2021 Corn Belt 150
