= Camden Murphy =

American racing driver

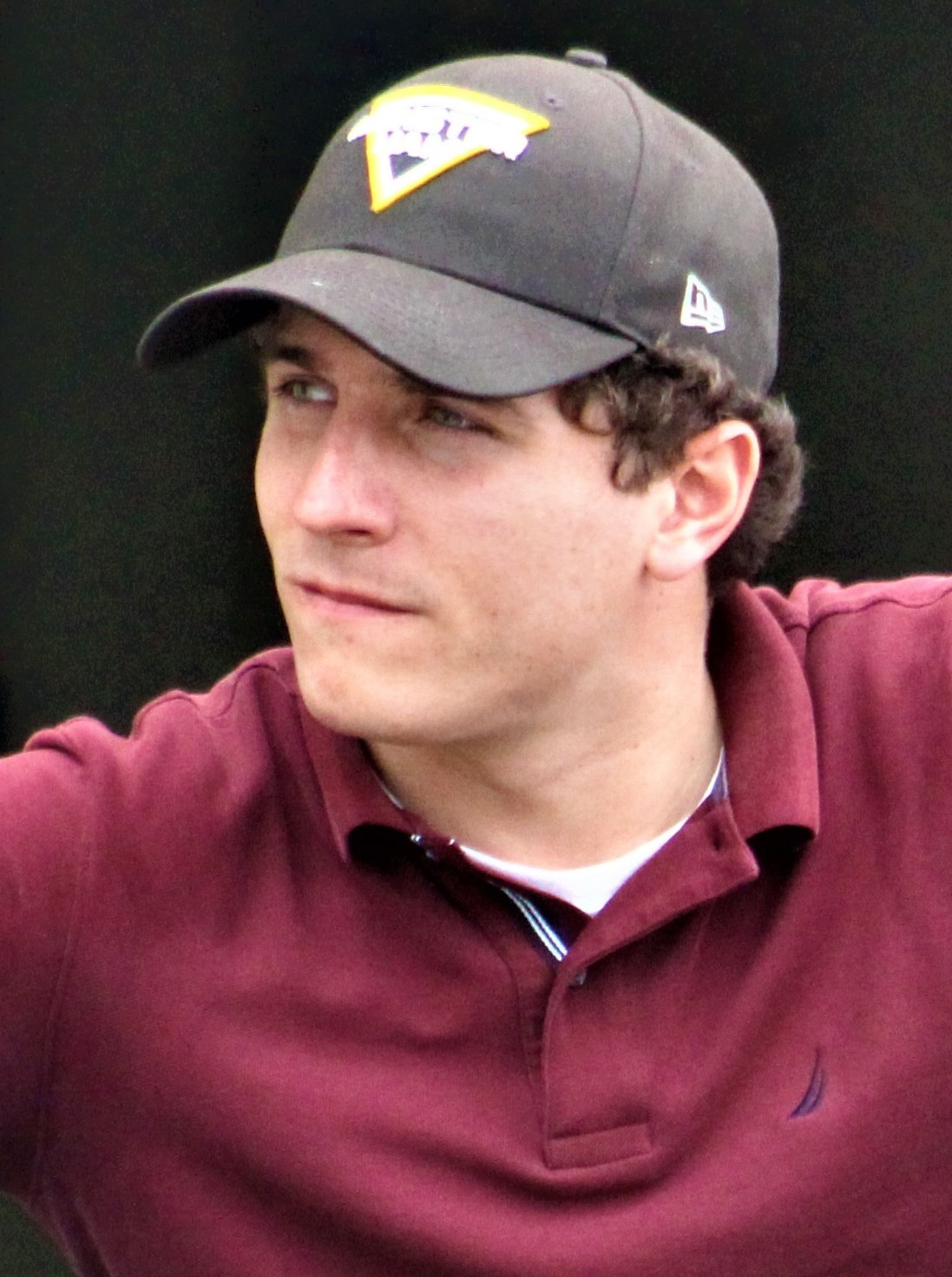
- Murphy at Indianapolis Motor Speedway in 2019
- Born: July 23, 1996 (age 30); Itasca, Illinois, U.S.

NASCAR O'Reilly Auto Parts Series career
- 7 races run over 2 years
- 2019 position: 94th
- Best finish: 72nd (2016)
- First race: 2016 Food City 300 (Bristol)
- Last race: 2019 Sport Clips Haircuts VFW 200 (Darlington)
Wins	Top tens	Poles
0	0	0

NASCAR FedEx Freight Truck Series career
- 29 races run over 9 years
- 2022 position: 81st
- Best finish: 32nd (2017)
- First race: 2014 Kroger 200 (Martinsville)
- Last race: 2022 Rackley Roofing 200 (Nashville)
Wins	Top tens	Poles
0	0	0

ARCA Menards Series career
- 1 race run over 1 year
- Best finish: 90th (2025)
- First race: 2025 General Tire 150 (Dover)
Wins	Top tens	Poles
0	1	0

ARCA Menards Series East career
- 1 race run over 1 year
- Best finish: 48th (2025)
- First race: 2025 General Tire 150 (Dover)
Wins	Top tens	Poles
0	1	0
- Statistics up to date as of July 18, 2025.

Camden Murphy (born July 23, 1996) is an American professional stock car and monster truck driver. He last competed part-time in the ARCA Menards Series, driving the No. 70 Toyota for Nitro Motorsports, and in Monster Jam, driving the Power Rush monster truck.

== Racing career ==
=== Early years ===
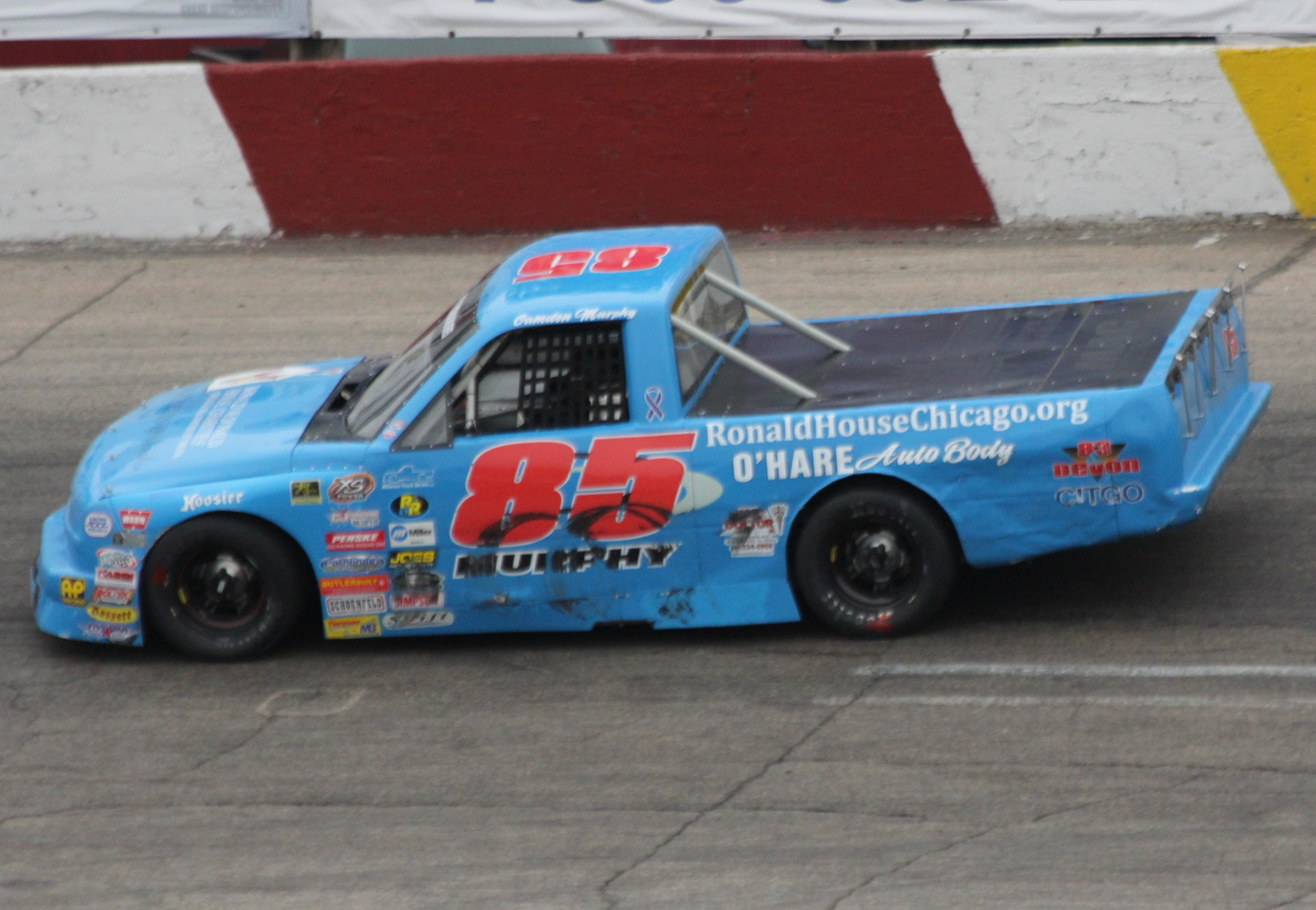
Murphy's American Ethanol Truck Series No. 85 at Rockford Speedway in 2015

Due to the lack of racing opportunities and the large amount of racing pushback in his hometown Chicago area, Murphy often raced in southeastern Wisconsin at tracks like Madison International Speedway and the Milwaukee Mile. Murphy gained substantial attention in 2012 when he won a Midwest Truck Series race at the Mile by way of a three-wide pass. Starting in 2013, Murphy instructed drivers on road courses like Road America and the Daytona International Speedway road course.

=== NASCAR ===
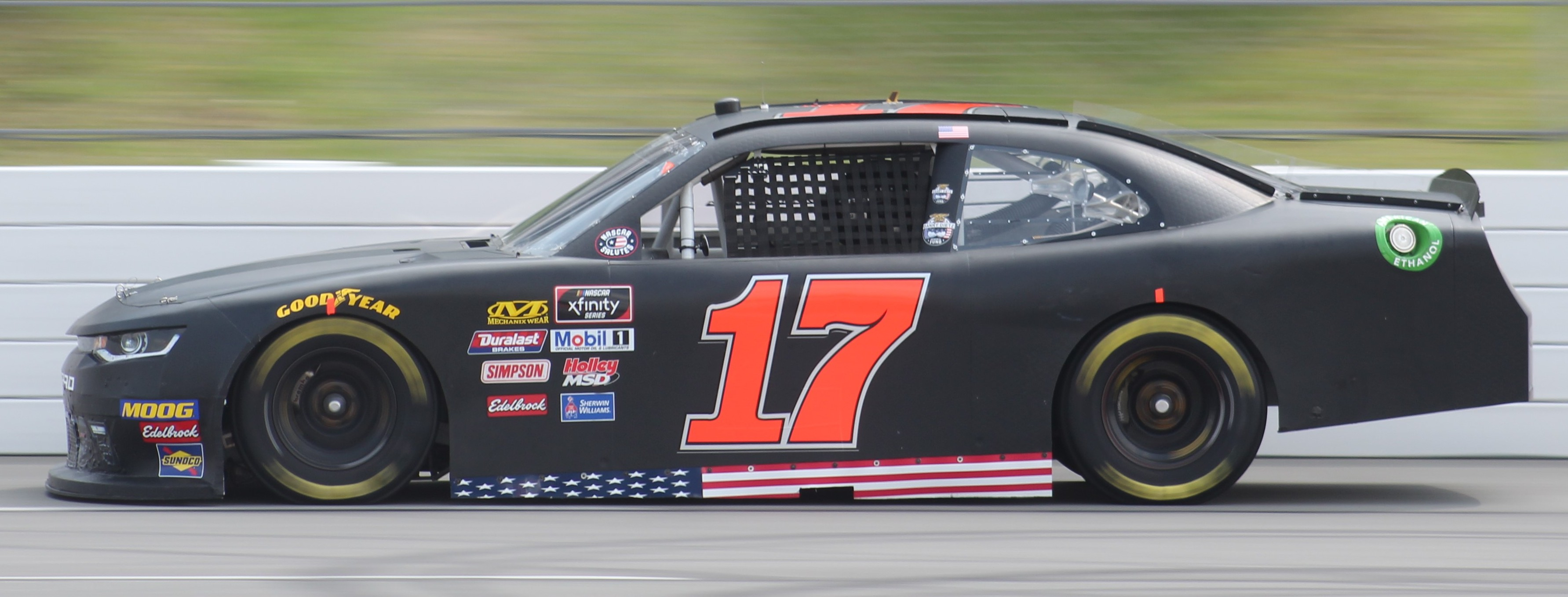
Murphy's No. 17 car at Pocono Raceway in 2019

Murphy made his NASCAR debut in 2014, driving the No. 08 truck for SS-Green Light Racing in the Camping World Truck Series at Martinsville Speedway. He finished on the lead lap in 21st while donating sponsorship to the Ronald McDonald House Charities. Murphy returned to Martinsville again in 2015, driving the No. 1 entry for MAKE Motorsports. Again Murphy posted a lead lap finish, this time in 24th. In 2016, Murphy moved up to the Xfinity Series, turning in a 26th-place finish in Rick Ware Racing's No. 25 entry at Bristol Motor Speedway. Off the merits of that race, Truck team Contreras Motorsports signed Murphy to drive his first NASCAR road course race, at Canadian Tire Motorsport Park in summer 2016. Murphy fell out with clutch problems after completing only three laps of the race in an unsponsored truck.

Murphy made his first intermediate track start in 2017, where he was a field-filler for Copp Motorsports in a Truck race at Kansas Speedway. A week later, MB Motorsports named Murphy as the driver of their No. 63 at Charlotte Motor Speedway. In 2021, Murphy joined Spencer Davis Motorsports for the Toyota Tundra 225.

=== ARCA Menards Series ===
In 2025, it was announced that Murphy would make his debut in the ARCA Menards Series at Dover Motor Speedway, driving the No. 70 Toyota for Nitro Motorsports. As it was a combination race with the ARCA Menards Series East, it also served as his debut in the East Series. He went on to finish second behind eventual race winner Brenden Queen.

=== Monster Jam ===
Murphy has been driving Monster Jam trucks since 2017, transitioning from Pirates Curse to the Bakugan Dragonoid truck in 2019, where he finished second in the freestyle and high jump events at Monster Jam World Finals XX. Murphy then drove the Classroom Crusher truck, and made his debut in San Diego, California, on January 11, 2025, where he placed first overall. Unveiled on May 15, 2026, Murphy transitioned into the new Power Rush monster truck. Murphy then set the overall land speed record in a monster truck at Indianapolis Motor Speedway clocked at 103 mph.

Murphy is colloquially known as "Monster Jam Cam" in the series.

== Personal life ==
After donating sponsorship space to the Ronald McDonald House Charities for a race in 2014, Murphy became an ambassador for the group in the Chicago region. He has volunteered for the charity dating back to 2012.

Murphy has taken up telling the story of another Illinois driver, Fred Lorenzen, to libraries around the state.

Murphy is friends with NASCAR Cup Series driver Josh Bilicki due to them both growing up in the same area and their interest of racing.

== Motorsports career results ==
=== NASCAR ===
(key) (Bold – Pole position awarded by qualifying time. Italics – Pole position earned by points standings or practice time. * – Most laps led.)

==== Xfinity Series ====
NASCAR Xfinity Series results
Year	Team	No.	Make	1	2	3	4	5	6	7	8	9	10	11	12	13	14	15	16	17	18	19	20	21	22	23	24	25	26	27	28	29	30	31	32	33	NXSC	Pts	Ref
2016	Rick Ware Racing	25	Chevy	DAY	ATL	LVS	PHO	CAL	TEX	BRI	RCH	TAL	DOV	CLT	POC	MCH	IOW	DAY	KEN	NHA	IND	IOW	GLN	MOH	BRI; 26	ROA	DAR	RCH	CHI	KEN	DOV	CLT	KAN	TEX	PHO	HOM	72nd	15	
2019	Mike Harmon Racing	74	Chevy	DAY	ATL	LVS	PHO	CAL	TEX	BRI	RCH	TAL	DOV	CLT; 29				CHI; 31	DAY		NHA; DNQ																94th	0^{1}	
2019	Rick Ware Racing	17	Chevy												POC; 32	MCH	IOW			KEN; 33																	94th	0^{1}	
2019	RSS Racing	93	Chevy																			IOW; 24	GLN	MOH			DAR; 20	IND	LVS	RCH	CLT	DOV	KAN	TEX	PHO	HOM	94th	0^{1}	
2019	RSS Racing	38	Chevy																						BRI; DNQ	ROA											94th	0^{1}	
2023	SS-Green Light Racing	08	Ford	DAY	CAL	LVS	PHO	ATL	COA	RCH	MAR	TAL	DOV	DAR	CLT	PIR	SON	NSH	CSC	ATL	NHA	POC	ROA	MCH	IRC; DNQ	GLN	DAY	DAR	KAN	BRI	TEX	ROV	LVS	HOM	MAR	PHO	N/A	0	

==== Camping World Truck Series ====
NASCAR Camping World Truck Series results
Year	Team	No.	Make	1	2	3	4	5	6	7	8	9	10	11	12	13	14	15	16	17	18	19	20	21	22	23	NCWTC	Pts	Ref
2014	SS-Green Light Racing	08	Chevy	DAY	MAR	KAN	CLT	DOV	TEX	GTW	KEN	IOW	ELD	POC	MCH	BRI	MSP	CHI	NHA	LVS	TAL	MAR; 21	TEX	PHO	HOM		71st	20	
2015	Rick Ware Racing	1	Chevy	DAY	ATL	MAR	KAN	CLT	DOV	TEX	GTW	IOW	KEN	ELD	POC	MCH	BRI	MSP	CHI	NHA	LVS	TAL	MAR; 24	TEX	PHO	HOM	70th	20	
2016	Contreras Motorsports	71	Chevy	DAY	ATL	MAR	KAN	DOV	CLT	TEX	IOW	GTW	KEN	ELD	POC	BRI	MCH	MSP; 31	CHI	NHA	LVS	TAL	MAR	TEX	PHO	HOM	110th	0^{1}	
2017	Copp Motorsports	36	Chevy	DAY	ATL	MAR	KAN; 30	CLT							POC; 28	MCH; 25	BRI									HOM; 27	32nd	124	
2017	Copp Motorsports	63	Chevy						DOV; 32	TEX			KEN; 30	ELD						NHA; 27							32nd	124	
2017	Copp Motorsports	83	Chevy								GTW; 23	IOW						MSP; 22	CHI; 22		LVS; 17	TAL	MAR	TEX	PHO		32nd	124	
2018	Copp Motorsports	63	Chevy	DAY	ATL	LVS	MAR	DOV; 29																			54th	40	
2018	TJL Motorsports	1	Chevy						KAN; DNQ	CLT																	54th	40	
2018	Jennifer Jo Cobb Racing	0	Chevy								TEX; 31	IOW; DNQ	GTW; DNQ	CHI; 30	KEN; 31	ELD	POC; 29	MCH; DNQ	BRI	MSP	LVS; Wth	TAL	MAR	TEX	PHO		54th	40	
2018	Beaver Motorsports	50	Chevy																							HOM; 32	54th	40	
2019	NEMCO Motorsports	8	Chevy	DAY	ATL	LVS	MAR	TEX	DOV	KAN	CLT; 30	TEX	IOW	GTW; 28	CHI; 23	KEN; 28	POC	ELD									108th	0^{1}	
2019	NEMCO Motorsports	87	Chevy																MCH; 31	BRI	MSP	LVS	TAL	MAR	PHO	HOM; DNQ	108th	0^{1}	
2020	NEMCO Motorsports	8	Chevy	DAY	LVS	CLT	ATL	HOM	POC	KEN	TEX	KAN	KAN	MCH	DRC	DOV	GTW	DAR	RCH	BRI; 19	LVS	TAL	KAN	TEX	MAR	PHO	64th	18	
2021	NEMCO Motorsports	8	Chevy	DAY	DRC; 13	LVS	ATL	BRD	RCH	KAN	DAR																50th	43	
2021	Spencer Davis Motorsports	11	Chevy									COA; 19	CLT	TEX	NSH	POC	KNX	GLN	GTW	DAR	BRI	LVS	TAL	MAR	PHO		50th	43	
2022	On Point Motorsports	30	Toyota	DAY	LVS	ATL	COA	MAR	BRD	DAR	KAN	TEX	CLT	GTW	SON	KNO	NSH; 34	MOH	POC	IRP	RCH	KAN	BRI	TAL	HOM	PHO	81st	3	

=== ARCA Menards Series ===
(key) (Bold – Pole position awarded by qualifying time. Italics – Pole position earned by points standings or practice time. * – Most laps led. ** – All laps led.)

ARCA Menards Series results
Year	Team	No.	Make	1	2	3	4	5	6	7	8	9	10	11	12	13	14	15	16	17	18	19	20	AMSC	Pts	Ref
2025	Nitro Motorsports	70	Toyota	DAY	PHO	TAL	KAN	CLT	MCH	BLN	ELK	LRP	DOV; 2	IRP	IOW	GLN	ISF	MAD	DSF	BRI	SLM	KAN	TOL	90th	42	

==== ARCA Menards Series East ====
ARCA Menards Series East results
Year	Team	No.	Make	1	2	3	4	5	6	7	8	AMSEC	Pts	Ref
2025	Nitro Motorsports	70	Toyota	FIF	CAR	NSV	FRS	DOV; 2	IRP	IOW	BRI	48th	42	

=== CARS Pro Late Model Tour ===
(key)

CARS Pro Late Model Tour results
Year	Team	No.	Make	1	2	3	4	5	6	7	8	9	10	11	12	13	CPLMTC	Pts	Ref
2025	Wilson Motorsports	20	Toyota	AAS	CDL	OCS	ACE	NWS; 11	CRW	HCY	HCY	AND	FLC	SBO	TCM	NWS	57th	32	

=== ASA STARS National Tour ===
(key) (Bold – Pole position awarded by qualifying time. Italics – Pole position earned by points standings or practice time. * – Most laps led. ** – All laps led.)

ASA STARS National Tour results
Year	Team	No.	Make	1	2	3	4	5	6	7	8	9	10	11	12	ASNTC	Pts	Ref
2025	Wilson Motorsports	20	Toyota	NSM	FIF	DOM	HCY; 8	NPS	MAD	SLG	AND	OWO	TOL	WIN	NSV	47th	52	

^{*} Season still in progress
^{1} Ineligible for series points
