= 2025 Daytona 500 =

NASCAR stock car race held in Daytona Beach, Florida, U.S.

Race details
- Race 1 of 36 in the 2025 NASCAR Cup Series
- Date: February 16, 2025
- Location: Daytona International Speedway in Daytona Beach, Florida
- Course: Permanent racing facility 2.5 mi (4 km)
- Distance: 201 laps, 502.5 mi (804 km)
- Scheduled distance: 200 laps, 500 mi (800 km)
- Average speed: 129.159 miles per hour (207.861 km/h)

Pole position
Driver	Chase Briscoe	Joe Gibbs Racing
- Time: 49.249

Qualifying race winners
Duel 1 Winner	Bubba Wallace	23XI Racing
Duel 2 Winner	Austin Cindric	Team Penske

Most laps led
Driver	Austin Cindric	Team Penske
- Laps: 59

Fastest lap
Driver	Michael McDowell	Spire Motorsports
- Time: 45.169

Winner
No. 24	William Byron	Hendrick Motorsports

Television in the United States
- Network: Fox
- Announcers: Mike Joy, Clint Bowyer, and Kevin Harvick
- Nielsen ratings: 6.761 million

Radio in the United States
- Radio: MRN
- Booth announcers: Alex Hayden, Mike Bagley, and Rusty Wallace
- Turn announcers: Dave Moody (1 & 2), Kyle Rickey (Backstretch), and Tim Catalfamo (3 & 4)

The 2025 Daytona 500 was a NASCAR Cup Series race and the 67th running of the event, held on Sunday, February 16, 2025, at Daytona International Speedway in Daytona Beach, Florida. It was the first race of the 2025 NASCAR Cup Series season.

William Byron of Hendrick Motorsports won his second straight Daytona 500 after Denny Hamlin, Cole Custer, and Chase Briscoe made contact while battling for the lead on the final lap, causing a crash that took out most of the field. Byron, who was seventh at the time of the contact, avoided the crash on the high line and held off Tyler Reddick for the final third of the lap to win. Two-time race champion and seven-time series champion Jimmie Johnson finished 3rd. Polesitter Chase Briscoe and John Hunter Nemechek rounded out the top five, and Alex Bowman, Ryan Blaney, Austin Cindric, Justin Allgaier, and Chris Buescher rounded out the top ten. Cindric and Team Penske teammate Joey Logano dominated much of the race, which finished nearly eight hours after it started due to a thunderstorm.

== Report ==
=== Background ===
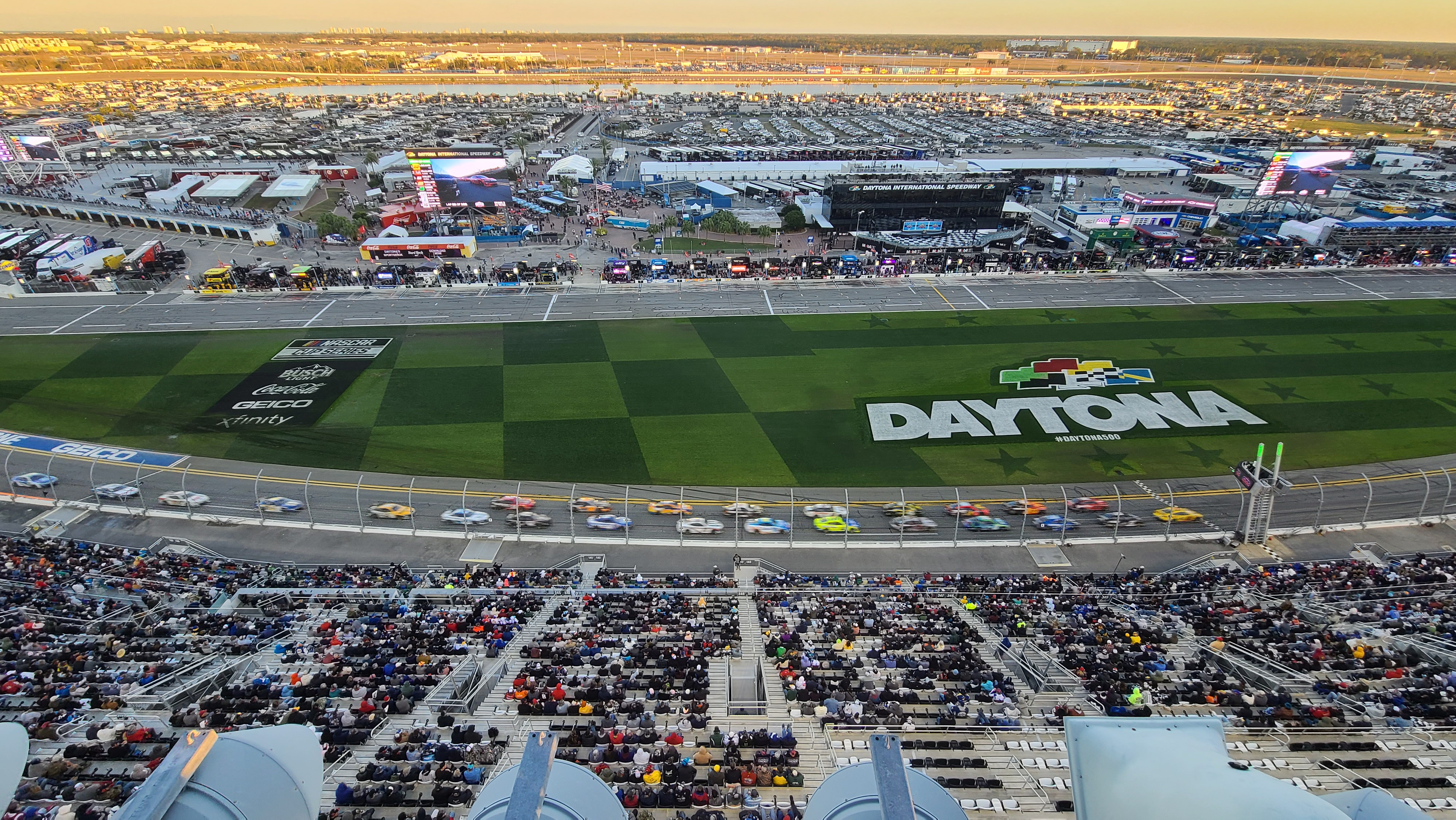
View of cars racing on the front stretch at the 2024 Daytona 500

Daytona International Speedway is one of three superspeedways to hold NASCAR races, the other two being Atlanta Motor Speedway and Talladega Superspeedway. The standard track at Daytona International Speedway is a four-turn superspeedway that is 2.5 miles (4.0 km) long. The track's turns are banked at 31 degrees, while the front stretch, the location of the finish line, is banked at 18 degrees.

The race was the debut for Shane van Gisbergen in the race after signing with Trackhouse Racing. The race was also the debut of multiple teams including Haas Factory Team, JR Motorsports, & Tricon Garage. This was also the first race with more than 40 cars since 2015, with Hélio Castroneves guaranteed to be in the 500 under the new Open Exemption Provisional rule.

==== Entry list ====
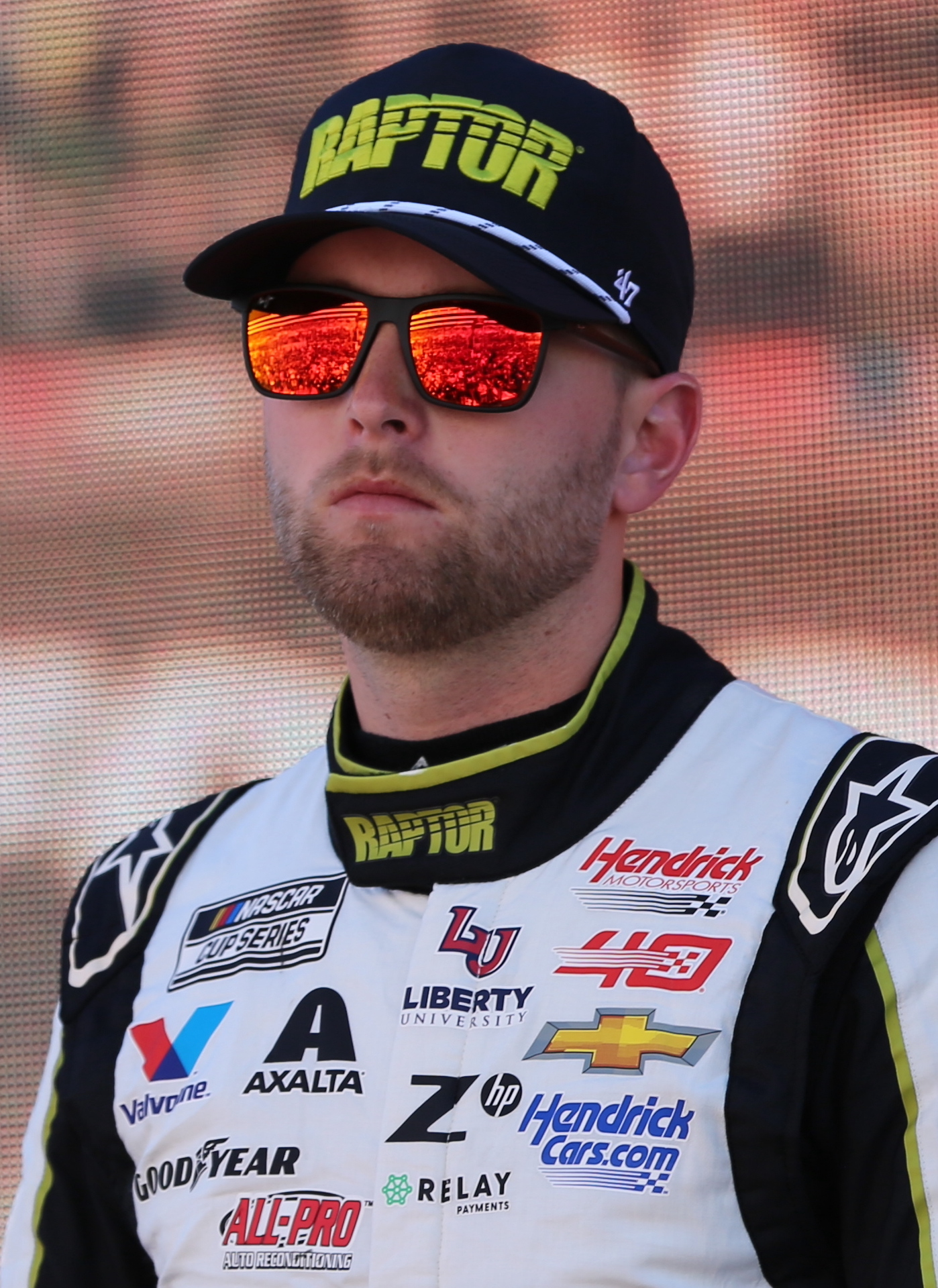
William Byron, the defending race winner, took his second Daytona 500 victory.

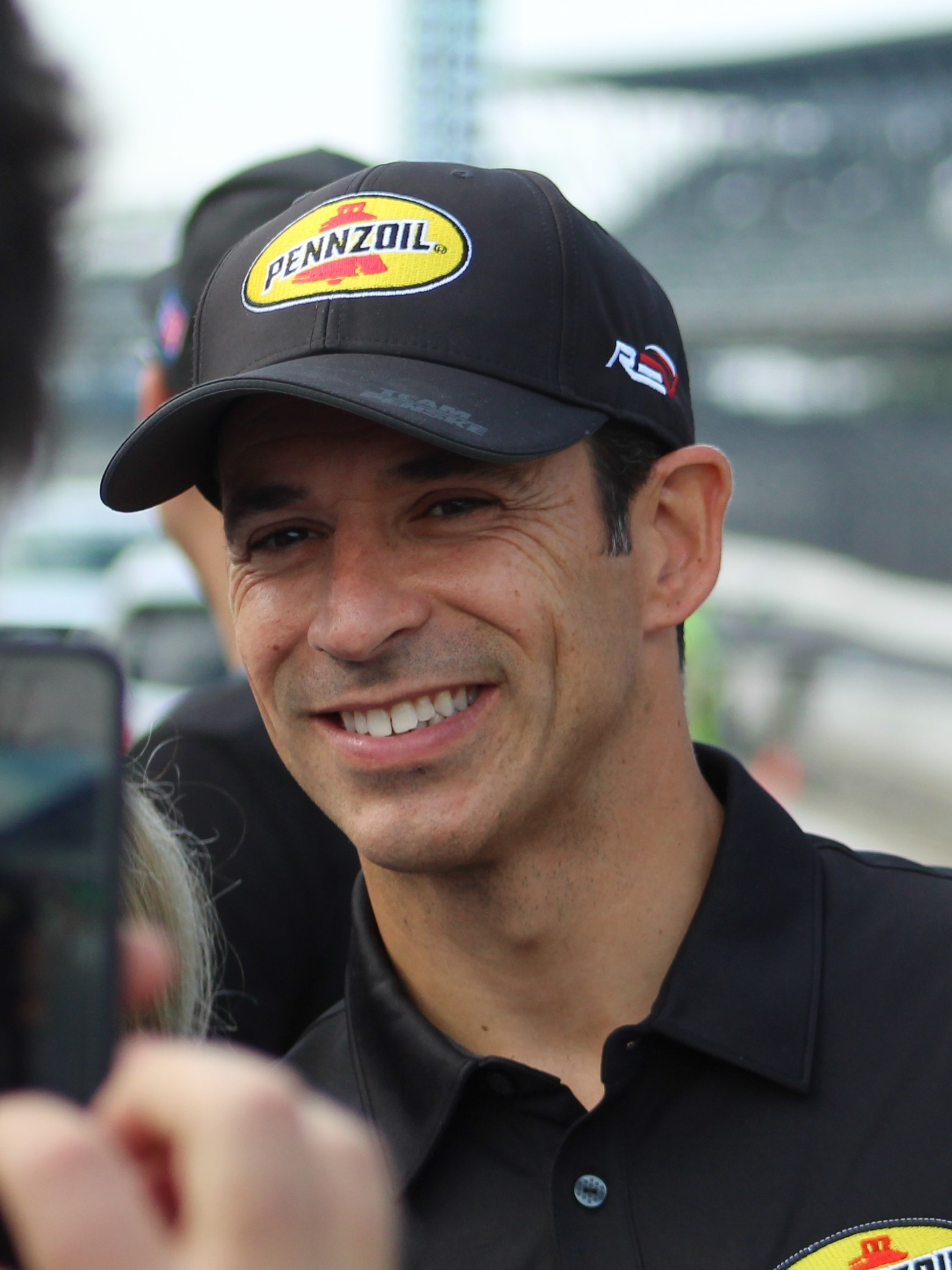
Hélio Castroneves was automatically guaranteed a spot into the Daytona 500 with the Open Exemption Provisional rule.

- (R) denotes rookie driver.
- (W) denotes former winner.
- (i) denotes driver who is ineligible for series driver points.

No.	Driver	Team	Manufacturer
1	Ross Chastain	Trackhouse Racing	Chevrolet
01	Corey LaJoie	Rick Ware Racing	Ford
2	Austin Cindric (W)	Team Penske	Ford
3	Austin Dillon (W)	Richard Childress Racing	Chevrolet
4	Noah Gragson	Front Row Motorsports	Ford
5	Kyle Larson	Hendrick Motorsports	Chevrolet
6	Brad Keselowski	RFK Racing	Ford
7	Justin Haley	Spire Motorsports	Chevrolet
8	Kyle Busch	Richard Childress Racing	Chevrolet
9	Chase Elliott	Hendrick Motorsports	Chevrolet
10	Ty Dillon	Kaulig Racing	Chevrolet
11	Denny Hamlin (W)	Joe Gibbs Racing	Toyota
12	Ryan Blaney	Team Penske	Ford
16	A. J. Allmendinger	Kaulig Racing	Chevrolet
17	Chris Buescher	RFK Racing	Ford
19	Chase Briscoe	Joe Gibbs Racing	Toyota
20	Christopher Bell	Joe Gibbs Racing	Toyota
21	Josh Berry	Wood Brothers Racing	Ford
22	Joey Logano (W)	Team Penske	Ford
23	Bubba Wallace	23XI Racing	Toyota
24	William Byron (W)	Hendrick Motorsports	Chevrolet
34	Todd Gilliland	Front Row Motorsports	Ford
35	Riley Herbst (R)	23XI Racing	Toyota
38	Zane Smith	Front Row Motorsports	Ford
40	Justin Allgaier (i)	JR Motorsports	Chevrolet
41	Cole Custer	Haas Factory Team	Ford
42	John Hunter Nemechek	Legacy Motor Club	Toyota
43	Erik Jones	Legacy Motor Club	Toyota
44	J. J. Yeley (i)	NY Racing Team	Chevrolet
45	Tyler Reddick	23XI Racing	Toyota
47	Ricky Stenhouse Jr. (W)	Hyak Motorsports	Chevrolet
48	Alex Bowman	Hendrick Motorsports	Chevrolet
51	Cody Ware	Rick Ware Racing	Ford
54	Ty Gibbs	Joe Gibbs Racing	Toyota
56	Martin Truex Jr.	Tricon Garage	Toyota
60	Ryan Preece	RFK Racing	Ford
62	Anthony Alfredo (i)	Beard Motorsports	Chevrolet
66	Chandler Smith (i)	Garage 66	Ford
71	Michael McDowell (W)	Spire Motorsports	Chevrolet
77	Carson Hocevar	Spire Motorsports	Chevrolet
78	B. J. McLeod	Live Fast Motorsports	Chevrolet
84	Jimmie Johnson (W)	Legacy Motor Club	Toyota
88	Shane van Gisbergen (R)	Trackhouse Racing	Chevrolet
91	Hélio Castroneves (i)	Trackhouse Racing	Chevrolet
99	Daniel Suárez	Trackhouse Racing	Chevrolet
Official entry list

== First practice (February 12) ==
Denny Hamlin was the fastest in the first practice session with a time of 48.005 seconds and a speed of 187.480 mph (301.720 km/h).

Pos	No.	Driver	Team	Manufacturer	Time	Speed
1	11	Denny Hamlin	Joe Gibbs Racing	Toyota	48.005	187.480
2	23	Bubba Wallace	23XI Racing	Toyota	48.150	186.916
3	54	Ty Gibbs	Joe Gibbs Racing	Toyota	48.291	186.370
Official first practice results

== Qualifying ==
Chase Briscoe scored the pole for the race with a time of 49.249 and a speed of 182.745 mph (294.100 km/h). Martin Truex Jr. and Jimmie Johnson were the two fastest open drivers to qualify on speed.

=== Qualifying results ===
Pos	No.	Driver	Team	Manufacturer	R1	R2
1	19	Chase Briscoe	Joe Gibbs Racing	Toyota	49.218	49.249
2	2	Austin Cindric	Team Penske	Ford	49.370	49.325
3	60	Ryan Preece	RFK Racing	Ford	49.356	49.335
4	22	Joey Logano	Team Penske	Ford	49.401	49.358
5	21	Josh Berry	Wood Brothers Racing	Ford	49.484	49.376
6	11	Denny Hamlin	Joe Gibbs Racing	Toyota	49.496	49.413
7	3	Austin Dillon	Richard Childress Racing	Chevrolet	49.487	49.444
8	20	Christopher Bell	Joe Gibbs Racing	Toyota	49.492	49.465
9	10	Ty Dillon	Kaulig Racing	Chevrolet	49.460	49.466
10	5	Kyle Larson	Hendrick Motorsports	Chevrolet	49.504	49.522
11	38	Zane Smith	Front Row Motorsports	Ford	49.505	—
12	48	Alex Bowman	Hendrick Motorsports	Chevrolet	49.506	—
13	8	Kyle Busch	Richard Childress Racing	Chevrolet	49.507	—
14	34	Todd Gilliland	Front Row Motorsports	Ford	49.535	—
15	9	Chase Elliott	Hendrick Motorsports	Chevrolet	49.538	—
16	6	Brad Keselowski	RFK Racing	Ford	49.545	—
17	71	Michael McDowell	Spire Motorsports	Chevrolet	49.571	—
18	17	Chris Buescher	RFK Racing	Ford	49.573	—
19	16	A. J. Allmendinger	Kaulig Racing	Chevrolet	49.616	—
20	12	Ryan Blaney	Team Penske	Ford	49.630	—
21	24	William Byron	Hendrick Motorsports	Chevrolet	49.636	—
22	56	Martin Truex Jr.	Tricon Garage	Toyota	49.641	—
23	4	Noah Gragson	Front Row Motorsports	Ford	49.660	—
24	54	Ty Gibbs	Joe Gibbs Racing	Toyota	49.695	—
25	99	Daniel Suárez	Trackhouse Racing	Chevrolet	49.742	—
26	45	Tyler Reddick	23XI Racing	Toyota	49.744	—
27	35	Riley Herbst (R)	23XI Racing	Toyota	49.770	—
28	23	Bubba Wallace	23XI Racing	Toyota	49.783	—
29	84	Jimmie Johnson	Legacy Motor Club	Toyota	49.783	—
30	88	Shane van Gisbergen (R)	Trackhouse Racing	Chevrolet	49.789	—
31	7	Justin Haley	Spire Motorsports	Chevrolet	49.825	—
32	41	Cole Custer	Haas Factory Team	Ford	49.830	—
33	40	Justin Allgaier (i)	JR Motorsports	Chevrolet	49.863	—
34	77	Carson Hocevar	Spire Motorsports	Chevrolet	49.865	—
35	01	Corey LaJoie	Rick Ware Racing	Ford	49.879	—
36	43	Erik Jones	Legacy Motor Club	Toyota	49.912	—
37	1	Ross Chastain	Trackhouse Racing	Chevrolet	49.997	—
38	42	John Hunter Nemechek	Legacy Motor Club	Toyota	50.025	—
39	91	Hélio Castroneves (i)	Trackhouse Racing	Chevrolet	50.062	—
40	62	Anthony Alfredo (i)	Beard Motorsports	Chevrolet	50.090	—
41	47	Ricky Stenhouse Jr.	Hyak Motorsports	Chevrolet	50.148	—
42	66	Chandler Smith (i)	Garage 66	Ford	50.351	—
43	78	B. J. McLeod	Live Fast Motorsports	Chevrolet	50.626	—
44	44	J. J. Yeley	NY Racing Team	Chevrolet	51.055	—
45	51	Cody Ware	Rick Ware Racing	Ford	51.835	—
Official qualifying results

== The Duel at Daytona ==
The Duel at Daytona races are a pair of NASCAR Cup Series races held in conjunction with the Daytona 500 annually in February at Daytona International Speedway. They consist of two races 60 laps and 150 miles (240 km) in length, which serve as heat races that set the lineup for the Daytona 500. Both races sets the lineup for positions 3–32. The first race sets the lineup for cars that qualified in odd–numbered positions on pole qualifying day. The second race sets the lineup for cars that qualified in even–numbered positions. Positions 33–36 are filled by the four drivers that posted the fastest lap in pole qualifying that didn't lock in a position in the Duel's. Positions 37–41 are set by the four cars highest in the 2019 owner's points that didn't lock in a position in the Duels and weren't among the cars that posted the four fastest timed laps in pole qualifying.

=== Duel 1 ===
==== Duel 1 results ====
Pos	Grid	No	Driver	Team	Manufacturer	Laps	Points
1	15	23	Bubba Wallace	23XI Racing	Toyota	60	10
2	11	24	William Byron	Hendrick Motorsports	Chevrolet	60	9
3	5	10	Ty Dillon	Kaulig Racing	Chevrolet	60	8
4	19	1	Ross Chastain	Trackhouse Racing	Chevrolet	60	7
5	14	45	Tyler Reddick	23XI Racing	Toyota	60	6
6	10	16	A. J. Allmendinger	Kaulig Racing	Chevrolet	60	5
7	4	3	Austin Dillon	Richard Childress Racing	Chevrolet	60	4
8	8	9	Chase Elliott	Hendrick Motorsports	Chevrolet	60	3
9	17	40	Justin Allgaier (i)	JR Motorsports	Chevrolet	60	0
10	7	8	Kyle Busch	Richard Childress Racing	Chevrolet	60	1
11	13	54	Ty Gibbs	Joe Gibbs Racing	Toyota	60	0
12	9	71	Michael McDowell	Spire Motorsports	Chevrolet	60	0
13	2	60	Ryan Preece	RFK Racing	Ford	60	0
14	3	21	Josh Berry	Wood Brothers Racing	Ford	60	0
15	12	56	Martin Truex Jr.	Tricon Garage	Toyota	60	0
16	21	47	Ricky Stenhouse Jr.	Hyak Motorsports	Chevrolet	60	0
17	23	44	J. J. Yeley	NY Racing Team	Chevrolet	60	0
18	18	77	Carson Hocevar	Spire Motorsports	Chevrolet	60	0
19	1	19	Chase Briscoe	Joe Gibbs Racing	Toyota	26	0
20	22	66	Chandler Smith (i)	Garage 66	Ford	13	0
21	16	7	Justin Haley	Spire Motorsports	Chevrolet	13	0
22	20	91	Hélio Castroneves (i)	Trackhouse Racing	Chevrolet	13	0
23	6	38	Zane Smith	Front Row Motorsports	Ford	6	0
Official race results

=== Duel 2 ===
==== Duel 2 results ====
Pos	Grid	No	Driver	Team	Manufacturer	Laps	Points
1	1	2	Austin Cindric	Team Penske	Ford	60	10
2	18	43	Erik Jones	Legacy Motor Club	Toyota	60	9
3	9	17	Chris Buescher	RFK Racing	Ford	60	8
4	3	11	Denny Hamlin	Joe Gibbs Racing	Toyota	60	7
5	2	22	Joey Logano	Team Penske	Ford	60	6
6	17	01	Corey LaJoie	Rick Ware Racing	Ford	60	5
7	7	34	Todd Gilliland	Front Row Motorsports	Ford	60	4
8	10	12	Ryan Blaney	Team Penske	Ford	60	3
9	19	42	John Hunter Nemechek	Legacy Motor Club	Toyota	60	2
10	4	20	Christopher Bell	Joe Gibbs Racing	Toyota	60	1
11	5	5	Kyle Larson	Hendrick Motorsports	Chevrolet	60	0
12	13	35	Riley Herbst (R)	23XI Racing	Toyota	60	0
13	20	62	Anthony Alfredo (i)	Beard Motorsports	Chevrolet	60	0
14	15	88	Shane van Gisbergen (R)	Trackhouse Racing	Chevrolet	60	0
15	22	51	Cody Ware	Rick Ware Racing	Ford	60	0
16	16	41	Cole Custer	Haas Factory Team	Ford	60	0
17	21	78	B. J. McLeod	Live Fast Motorsports	Chevrolet	60	0
18	11	4	Noah Gragson	Front Row Motorsports	Ford	60	0
19	14	84	Jimmie Johnson	Legacy Motor Club	Toyota	60	0
20	8	6	Brad Keselowski	RFK Racing	Ford	48	0
21	12	99	Daniel Suárez	Trackhouse Racing	Chevrolet	47	0
22	6	48	Alex Bowman	Hendrick Motorsports	Chevrolet	47	0
Official race results

=== Starting lineup ===
Pos	No.	Driver	Team	Manufacturer	Notes
1	19	Chase Briscoe	Joe Gibbs Racing	Toyota	Fastest in pole qualifying
2	2	Austin Cindric	Team Penske	Ford	Second in pole qualifying
3	23	Bubba Wallace	23XI Racing	Toyota	Duel 1 Winner
4	43	Erik Jones	Legacy Motor Club	Toyota	Second in Duel 2
5	24	William Byron	Hendrick Motorsports	Chevrolet	Second in Duel 1
6	17	Chris Buescher	RFK Racing	Ford	Third in Duel 2
7	10	Ty Dillon	Kaulig Racing	Chevrolet	Third in Duel 1
8	11	Denny Hamlin	Joe Gibbs Racing	Toyota	Fourth in Duel 2
9	1	Ross Chastain	Trackhouse Racing	Chevrolet	Fourth in Duel 1
10	22	Joey Logano	Team Penske	Ford	Fifth in Duel 2
11	45	Tyler Reddick	23XI Racing	Toyota	Fifth in Duel 1
12	01	Corey LaJoie	Rick Ware Racing	Ford	Sixth in Duel 2
13	16	A. J. Allmendinger	Kaulig Racing	Chevrolet	Sixth in Duel 1
14	34	Todd Gilliland	Front Row Motorsports	Ford	Seventh in Duel 2
15	3	Austin Dillon	Richard Childress Racing	Chevrolet	Seventh in Duel 1
16	12	Ryan Blaney	Team Penske	Ford	Eighth in Duel 2
17	9	Chase Elliott	Hendrick Motorsports	Chevrolet	Eighth in Duel 1
18	42	John Hunter Nemechek	Legacy Motor Club	Toyota	Ninth in Duel 2
19	40	Justin Allgaier (i)	JR Motorsports	Chevrolet	Ninth in Duel 1
20	20	Christopher Bell	Joe Gibbs Racing	Toyota	Tenth in Duel 2
21	8	Kyle Busch	Richard Childress Racing	Chevrolet	Tenth in Duel 1
22	5	Kyle Larson	Hendrick Motorsports	Chevrolet	Eleventh in Duel 2
23	54	Ty Gibbs	Joe Gibbs Racing	Toyota	Eleventh in Duel 1
24	35	Riley Herbst (R)	23XI Racing	Toyota	Twelfth in Duel 2
25	71	Michael McDowell	Spire Motorsports	Chevrolet	Twelfth in Duel 1
26	88	Shane van Gisbergen (R)	Trackhouse Racing	Chevrolet	Fourteenth in Duel 2
27	60	Ryan Preece	RFK Racing	Ford	Thirteenth in Duel 1
28	51	Cody Ware	Rick Ware Racing	Ford	Fifteenth in Duel 2
29	21	Josh Berry	Wood Brothers Racing	Ford	Fourteenth in Duel 1
30	41	Cole Custer	Haas Factory Team	Ford	Sixteenth in Duel 2
31	47	Ricky Stenhouse Jr.	Hyak Motorsports	Chevrolet	Sixteenth in Duel 1
32	4	Noah Gragson	Front Row Motorsports	Ford	Eighteenth in Duel 2
33	77	Carson Hocevar	Spire Motorsports	Chevrolet	Eighteenth in Duel 1
34	6	Brad Keselowski	RFK Racing	Ford	20th in Duel 2
35	7	Justin Haley	Spire Motorsports	Chevrolet	21st in Duel 1
36	99	Daniel Suárez	Trackhouse Racing	Chevrolet	21st in Duel 2
37	38	Zane Smith	Front Row Motorsports	Ford	23rd in Duel 1
38	48	Alex Bowman	Hendrick Motorsports	Chevrolet	22nd in Duel 2
39	56	Martin Truex Jr.	Tricon Garage	Toyota	Qualifying Speed
40	84	Jimmie Johnson	Legacy Motor Club	Toyota	Qualifying Speed
41	91	Hélio Castroneves (i)	Trackhouse Racing	Chevrolet	Open Exemption Provisional
Did not qualify
42	44	J. J. Yeley	NY Racing Team	Chevrolet	
43	62	Anthony Alfredo (i)	Beard Motorsports	Chevrolet	
44	66	Chandler Smith (i)	Garage 66	Ford	
45	78	B. J. McLeod	Live Fast Motorsports	Chevrolet	
Official starting lineup

== Practice (post–Duels) ==
=== Second practice (February 14) ===
William Byron was the fastest in the second practice session with a time of 46.172 seconds and a speed of 194.923 mph (313.698 km/h).

Pos	No.	Driver	Team	Manufacturer	Time	Speed
1	24	William Byron	Hendrick Motorsports	Chevrolet	46.172	194.923
2	9	Chase Elliott	Hendrick Motorsports	Chevrolet	46.210	194.763
3	47	Ricky Stenhouse Jr.	Hyak Motorsports	Chevrolet	46.230	194.679
Official second practice results

=== Final practice (February 15) ===
Brad Keselowski was the fastest in the final practice session with a time of 46.558 seconds and a speed of 193.307 mph (311.097 km/h).

Pos	No.	Driver	Team	Manufacturer	Time	Speed
1	6	Brad Keselowski	RFK Racing	Ford	46.558	193.307
2	48	Alex Bowman	Hendrick Motorsports	Chevrolet	46.566	193.274
3	41	Cole Custer	Haas Factory Team	Ford	46.581	193.212
Official final practice results

== Race ==
=== Stage 1 ===
Originally scheduled for a 2:50pm start of engines, the start was accelerated where engines started at 1:46pm because of weather issues. After additional parade laps (including two with President Trump), the green flag waved at 2:06pm. As some drizzle occurred at the start, pole sitter Chase Briscoe led the first lap of the race. On lap 5, defending race winner William Byron took the lead down the backstretch but Ty Dillon got side by side with Byron and Dillon beat Byron to the line and led lap 5. Dillon would lead laps 6 and 7 before Byron would take the lead on lap 8. On lap 9, the first caution flew for rain in the area, which led to a red flag at 2:20pm after eight laps.

At 5:30pm, the race restarted after the 3:09:59 red flag with more laps under the safety car in order to dry pit lane. After pit stops and a total of ten laps of running, all under the safety car, the race is red flagged at 5:54pm for more drizzle, where the red flag is pulled at 6:15pm. With 44 laps remaining in the first stage, teams pit, hoping to make the stage without any more fuel stops.

The race restarts on Lap 24 with defending Series champion Joey Logano leading. The field quickly got 3 wide for about 10 rows deep from 4th on back. On lap 31, William Byron took the lead from Logano. On lap 32, Corey LaJoie took the lead. On lap 35, Joey Logano took the lead. On lap 40, Chase Elliott took the lead. On lap 42, a three wide battle for the lead took place between Elliott, Logano, and Kyle Busch. Busch was looking for his first Daytona 500 win in his 21st attempt. But Logano would beat the others and Logano took the lead and would hold on to it. On lap 43, A. J. Allmendinger's day would end as his engine blew. No caution flew because Allmendinger's car did not leak oil onto the track. On lap 45, another 3 wide battle for the lead would happen between Logano, William Byron, and Shane van Gisbergen but Logano would hold off the other 2 and keep the lead. Soon the field would begin the calm down with parts of the top 10 going single file and most of the rest behind them going two wide. With three laps remaining before the top ten are paid points on Lap 65, the first incident-related safety car is called on Lap 62 after Denny Hamlin, Zane Smith, and Josh Berry collide in the west banking. It started when the inside line began to check up and hit each other in the back which caused Smith to bump Hamlin too hard and cause Hamlin to go sideways. Smith then got doored by Austin Cindric causing Smith to go side ways and come up the track in front of Josh Berry giving Berry damage and causing Smith to spin. Smith and Berry tried to continue but were too slow and would eventually retire from the race with Berry retiring at lap 105 and Smith retiring at lap 108. With Logano in the lead at the end of Lap 65, with the race neutralised by the safety car, he scored the ten championship points and one playoff point.

=== Stage 2 ===
With pit lane closed because of the Lap 63 safety car, and NASCAR regulations prohibiting pit stops in the last two laps of the stage, pit lane opens on Lap 66, the first lap of the second stage, where cars pit for fuel and tires. Joey Logano won the race off of pit road. The second stage started on Lap 71, but Logano slowed on the restart with what would eventually be found as a piece of debris on the throttle body, causing a stack up on the bottom line. Alex Bowman leads, but on the outside line John Hunter Nemechek went low to avoid the stack up but turned Ross Chastain and Chastain turned up into Hélio Castroneves and would begin a chain reaction wreck. The cars involved were Hélio Castroneves, Ross Chastain, John Hunter Nemechek, Chase Briscoe, Jimmie Johnson, Kyle Busch, Riley Herbst, Martin Truex Jr., Justin Allgaier, and Cody Ware. Chastain, Castroneves, and Truex would all retire from the race. Shane van Gisbergen also got damage from the outside line stack up which would slow his car down. It was enough to make minimum speed but it wasn't as fast as it once was.

Logano initially noted the debris on the grille caused overheating, and lost a lap. Ryan Blaney was the new leader and he led the field to the restart on lap 77. On the restart, their other teammate Austin Cindric took the lead from Blaney. On lap 79, Ryan Preece took the lead. On lap 80, a three wide battle for the lead would occur between Preece, Cindric, and Noah Gragson with Gragson leading lap 80. The three remained three wide with Cindric leading laps 81 and 82 before the 4th caution flew on lap 83 for debris.

Logano, as the beneficiary, pits to remove the debris from the throttle body. All other teams refueled to ensure their cars could reach the second stage end, and points-paying lap, on Lap 130 without needing a fuel stop. Cindric won the race off of pit road, with the race restarting on Lap 87. Cindric and Chase Elliott were side by side for the lead with Cindric leading lap 87 before Michael McDowell peaked to the outside and made it 3 wide again for the lead. Cindric would be able to hold on to lead. On lap 90, McDowell would take the lead. Cindric would get side by side with McDowell and lead lap 91 before Noah Gragson attempted to take the lead. McDowell would take the lead on lap 94 before Gragson would take it on lap 95. Cindric would lead lap 96 with Ryan Preece making it 3 wide alongside Cindric and Gragson. Preece would take the lead on lap 97. On lap 100, both Noah Gragson and Alex Bowman attempted to take the lead from Preece but Preece would lead that lap and lap 101 before Bowman would lead on lap 102. Bowman and Austin Cindric battled for the lead with Bowman leading the laps before lap 106 when Cindric took the lead. The field would soon go two wide for multiple laps. On lap 116, Alex Bowman would take the lead. Cindric would take it back the next lap. Bowman would take the lead on lap 123. Cindric would take it back on lap 124 before Bowman led lap 125 and Cindric again on lap 126. On the last lap of stage 2 on lap 130, Ryan Blaney would beat out Austin Cindric and Blaney would win stage 2.

=== Final stage ===
The final 70 lap segment started with teams pitting for tires and fuel, knowing how tires were necessary because of handling because of the 15-year old asphalt that had lost grip. Ryan Blaney won the race off of pit road and leading the field to the restart on lap 138. On lap 139, Bubba Wallace took the lead. Blaney would take the lead on lap 142 before Wallace took it back the next lap. It was a 3 wide battle for the lead between Wallace, Blaney, and Kyle Busch. Blaney would take the lead on lap 146. Wallace would take the lead with 52 laps to go on lap 149. Soon William Byron joined in on the 3 wide battle for the lead with Wallace and Blaney. With 48 to go, Blaney took the lead. Wallace would take it back with 46 to go before Blaney took it with 44 to go and then by Wallace again with 43 to go. With 42 to go, William Byron took the lead. Blaney would take it back the next lap. Wallace took the lead with 40 to go.

On Lap 162, debris in Turn 1 caused a sixth safety car neutralisation. Teams could pit and be assured they could complete the remainder of regulation on fuel (notwithstanding additional safety car laps in case of a Lap 199 safety car). Austin Cindric won the race off of pit road and he led the field to the restart with 35 laps to go. On the restart, Bubba Wallace took the lead. With 34 to go, Austin Cindric took the lead. Soon, most of the top 10 was single file while the rest behind them were 3 wide. With 16 laps to go, Corey LaJoie, who was in that 3 wide pack, attempted to take the lead with a push from Ricky Stenhouse Jr.

On Lap 186, with 15 remaining, the first major incident occurred on the backstretch. Joey Logano tried to split the middle in between Ricky Stenhouse Jr. and Ryan Blaney. Stenhouse went and continued to try to block Logano even with Logano being on his quarter panel. Logano would hook Stenhouse into Blaney and Logano would get hooked by Noah Gragson causing the wreck. The cars involved were Joey Logano, Ryan Blaney, Noah Gragson, Chase Elliott, Kyle Busch, Ricky Stenhouse Jr., Todd Gilliland, Cole Custer, and Brad Keselowski. Only Logano and Busch would retire from the race. Corey LaJoie was leading when the caution came out and he led the field to the restart with on Lap 193, with eight laps remaining. On the restart, Austin Cindric took the lead after he fooled LaJoie with the blocks LaJoie attempted. Denny Hamlin took the lead officially when the field crossed the line. Hamlin was looking for his fourth win. A lap later, Hamlin's teammate Christopher Bell attempted to take the lead as he got side by side with Hamlin. A second lap later, Bell would get turned by Cole Custer down the backstretch where Bell pounded the outside wall head on triggering the 3rd big wreck in the biggest and wildest crash of the night. Bell came down across the track in front of Ryan Preece where Preece's car ramped off of Bell's car while Preece also hit Erik Jones causing Preece's front end to lift off the ground and do a wheelie. The car then steered left with the wind which caused his car to blow over onto its roof. The car skidded on its roof up the turn 3 banking where it landed on all fours before it hit the outside wall with the rear of the car just missing the catch fence in the process. Preece would get out uninjured. This was the second time at Daytona where Preece has flipped with the first time occurring almost a year and a half ago where his car barrel rolled 10 times. The wreck took out 10 cars. The cars involved were Christopher Bell, Cole Custer, Ryan Preece, Brad Keselowski, Kyle Larson, Erik Jones, Daniel Suárez, Bubba Wallace, Chase Elliott, and Justin Allgaier. Only Preece, Bell, and Wallace would retire from the race.

The race was stopped with a red flag because of debris issues for six minutes. Pit lane opened on Lap 198 for lead lap cars, then lapped cars, with the ensuing restart held under green-white-checker finish rules on Lap 200. Hamlin would lead the field to the green flag. On the restart, Austin Cindric took the lead with a push from Cole Custer. As the cars took the white flag for the last lap, Riley Herbst got bumped by Corey LaJoie, sending Herbst sideways. However, Herbst was able to save it and keep his car straight. The race stayed green, meaning it would end with the next change of flag. Down the backstretch, Hamlin got to the outside of Cindric and attempted to take the lead. Custer went to the outside of Hamlin and Cindric to make it three wide. Custer went down and got turned by Chase Briscoe and he spun down into Denny Hamlin turning Hamlin around while Corey LaJoie spun to the inside triggering the 4th big wreck of the race. The wreck collected a total of 11 cars as the cars involved were Denny Hamlin, Cole Custer, Corey LaJoie, Chase Briscoe, Austin Cindric, John Hunter Nemechek, Alex Bowman, Ty Gibbs, Cody Ware, Justin Haley, and Austin Dillon. William Byron, who was 7th at the time of the crash, managed to avoid the pile-up and take the lead, with Tyler Reddick right behind him. With no caution being flown, Byron held off Reddick to win his second consecutive Daytona 500, becoming the first driver to win consecutive Daytona 500 races since Denny Hamlin in 2019 and 2020. Jimmie Johnson filled out the podium, his first podium finish since August 2020, when he finished third in the second of consecutive 500-kilometer races held that weekend. Chase Briscoe, and John Hunter Nemechek rounded out the top 5 while Alex Bowman, Ryan Blaney, Austin Cindric, Justin Allgaier, and Chris Buescher rounded out the top 10. This the first time the Jimmie Johnson led Legacy Motor Club put two cars in the top five, while this was Justin Allgaier's first Cup Series top 10 since 2015 while also giving JR Motorsports their first Cup Series top 10 finish.

== Race results ==
=== Stage results ===
Stage One Laps: 65

Pos	No	Driver	Team	Manufacturer	Points
1	22	Joey Logano	Team Penske	Ford	10
2	6	Brad Keselowski	RFK Racing	Ford	9
3	12	Ryan Blaney	Team Penske	Ford	8
4	47	Ricky Stenhouse Jr.	Hyak Motorsports	Chevrolet	7
5	20	Christopher Bell	Joe Gibbs Racing	Toyota	6
6	99	Daniel Suárez	Trackhouse Racing	Chevrolet	5
7	48	Alex Bowman	Hendrick Motorsports	Chevrolet	4
8	45	Tyler Reddick	23XI Racing	Toyota	3
9	43	Erik Jones	Legacy Motor Club	Toyota	2
10	24	William Byron	Hendrick Motorsports	Chevrolet	1
Official stage one results

Stage Two Laps: 65

Pos	No	Driver	Team	Manufacturer	Points
1	12	Ryan Blaney	Team Penske	Ford	10
2	2	Austin Cindric	Team Penske	Ford	9
3	9	Chase Elliott	Hendrick Motorsports	Chevrolet	8
4	48	Alex Bowman	Hendrick Motorsports	Chevrolet	7
5	34	Todd Gilliland	Front Row Motorsports	Ford	6
6	17	Chris Buescher	RFK Racing	Ford	5
7	43	Erik Jones	Legacy Motor Club	Toyota	4
8	22	Joey Logano	Team Penske	Ford	3
9	23	Bubba Wallace	23XI Racing	Toyota	2
10	8	Kyle Busch	Richard Childress Racing	Chevrolet	1
Official stage two results

=== Final stage results ===
Stage Three Laps: 70

Pos	Grid	No	Driver	Team	Manufacturer	Laps	Points
1	5	24	William Byron	Hendrick Motorsports	Chevrolet	201	41
2	11	45	Tyler Reddick	23XI Racing	Toyota	201	38
3	40	84	Jimmie Johnson	Legacy Motor Club	Toyota	201	34
4	1	19	Chase Briscoe	Joe Gibbs Racing	Toyota	201	33 (Note: On February 19, 2025, the Gibbs No. 19 team was penalised 100 points and ten playoff points after infractions with the spoiler and body were discovered at the NASCAR research and development laboratory. A four race suspension was also assessed on crew chief James Small. However on March 5, the Gibbs No. 19 team successfully appealed the penalty. The points lost were regained and Small's race suspension was lifted.)
5	18	42	John Hunter Nemechek	Legacy Motor Club	Toyota	201	32
6	38	48	Alex Bowman	Hendrick Motorsports	Chevrolet	201	42
7	16	12	Ryan Blaney	Team Penske	Ford	201	48
8	2	2	Austin Cindric	Team Penske	Ford	201	38
9	19	40	Justin Allgaier (i)	JR Motorsports	Chevrolet	201	0
10	6	17	Chris Buescher	RFK Racing	Ford	201	32
11	25	71	Michael McDowell	Spire Motorsports	Chevrolet	201	27
12	4	43	Erik Jones	Legacy Motor Club	Toyota	201	31
13	36	99	Daniel Suárez	Trackhouse Racing	Chevrolet	201	29
14	7	10	Ty Dillon	Kaulig Racing	Chevrolet	201	23
15	17	9	Chase Elliott	Hendrick Motorsports	Chevrolet	201	30
16	23	54	Ty Gibbs	Joe Gibbs Racing	Toyota	201	21
17	24	35	Riley Herbst (R)	23XI Racing	Toyota	201	20
18	31	47	Ricky Stenhouse Jr.	Hyak Motorsports	Chevrolet	201	26
19	35	7	Justin Haley	Spire Motorsports	Chevrolet	201	18
20	22	5	Kyle Larson	Hendrick Motorsports	Chevrolet	201	17
21	30	41	Cole Custer	Haas Factory Team	Ford	201	16
22	12	01	Corey LaJoie	Rick Ware Racing	Ford	201	15
23	15	3	Austin Dillon	Richard Childress Racing	Chevrolet	201	14
24	8	11	Denny Hamlin	Joe Gibbs Racing	Toyota	201	13
25	28	51	Cody Ware	Rick Ware Racing	Ford	201	2
26	34	6	Brad Keselowski	RFK Racing	Ford	200	20
27	14	34	Todd Gilliland	Front Row Motorsports	Ford	199	6
28	32	4	Noah Gragson	Front Row Motorsports	Ford	198	9
29	3	23	Bubba Wallace	23XI Racing	Toyota	197	10
30	33	77	Carson Hocevar	Spire Motorsports	Chevrolet	196	7
31	20	20	Christopher Bell	Joe Gibbs Racing	Toyota	195	12
32	27	60	Ryan Preece	RFK Racing	Ford	195	5
33	26	88	Shane van Gisbergen (R)	Trackhouse Racing	Chevrolet	193	4
34	21	8	Kyle Busch	Richard Childress Racing	Chevrolet	186	4
35	10	22	Joey Logano	Team Penske	Ford	185	15
36	37	38	Zane Smith	Front Row Motorsports	Ford	107	1
37	29	21	Josh Berry	Wood Brothers Racing	Ford	104	1
38	39	56	Martin Truex Jr.	Tricon Garage	Toyota	71	1
39	41	91	Hélio Castroneves (i)	Trackhouse Racing	Chevrolet	70	0
40	9	1	Ross Chastain	Trackhouse Racing	Chevrolet	70	1
41	13	16	A. J. Allmendinger	Kaulig Racing	Chevrolet	42	1
Official race results

=== Race statistics ===
- Lead changes: 56 among 15 different drivers
- Cautions/Laps: 8 for 47 laps
- Red flags: 3 for 3 hours, 36 minutes, and 33 seconds
- Time of race: 3 hours, 53 minutes, and 26 seconds
- Average speed: 129.159 miles per hour (207.861 km/h)

== Media ==
=== Television ===
Since 2001—with the exception of 2002, 2004 and 2006—the Daytona 500 has been carried by Fox in the United States. The booth crew consisted of longtime NASCAR lap-by-lap announcer Mike Joy, Clint Bowyer, and 2007 Daytona 500 winner Kevin Harvick. Jamie Little, Regan Smith, and Josh Sims handled pit road for the television side. 1992 and 1998 Daytona 500 winning crew chief Larry McReynolds provided insight on-site during the race.

Fox Television
Booth announcers	Pit reporters	In-race analyst
Lap-by-lap: Mike Joy; Color-commentator: Clint Bowyer; Color-commentator: Kevin Harvick	Jamie Little; Regan Smith; Josh Sims	Larry McReynolds

=== Radio ===
The race was broadcast on radio by the Motor Racing Network who have covered the Daytona 500 since 1970—and simulcast on Sirius XM NASCAR Radio. The booth crew consisted of Alex Hayden, Mike Bagley, and 1989 Cup Series champion Rusty Wallace. Longtime turn announcer Dave Moody was the lead turn announcer, calling the race from atop the Sunoco tower outside the exit of turn 2 when the field races through turns 1 and 2. Kyle Rickey worked the backstretch for the race from a spotter's stand on the inside of the track & Tim Catalfamo called the race when the field races through turns 3 and 4 from the Sunoco tower outside the exit of turn 4. On pit road, MRN was operated by Steve Post, Chris Wilner, Jacklyn Drake and Alan Cavanna.

MRN Radio
Booth announcers	Turn announcers	Pit reporters
Lead announcer: Alex Hayden; Announcer: Mike Bagley; Announcer: Rusty Wallace	Turns 1 & 2: Dave Moody; Backstretch: Kyle Rickey; Turns 3 & 4: Tim Catalfamo	Steve Post; Chris Wilner; Jacklyn Drake; Alan Cavanna

== Standings after the race ==
Drivers' Championship standings

Pos	Driver	Points
1	Ryan Blaney	51
2	William Byron	50 (–1)
3	Austin Cindric	48 (–3)
4	Tyler Reddick	44 (–7)
5	Alex Bowman	42 (–9)
6	Chris Buescher	40 (–11)
7	Erik Jones	40 (–11)
8	Jimmie Johnson	34 (–17)
9	John Hunter Nemechek	34 (–17)
10	Chase Elliott	33 (–18)
11	Ty Dillon	31 (–20)
12	Daniel Suárez	29 (–22)
13	Michael McDowell	27 (–24)
14	Ricky Stenhouse Jr.	26 (–25)
15	Ty Gibbs	21 (–30)
16	Joey Logano	21 (–30)
Official driver's standings

Manufacturers' Championship standings

Pos	Manufacturer	Points
1	Chevrolet	40
2	Toyota	35 (–5)
3	Ford	30 (–10)

- Note: Only the first 16 positions are included for the driver standings.

== Notes ==
Previous race: 2024 NASCAR Cup Series Championship Race	NASCAR Cup Series; 2025 season	Next race: 2025 Ambetter Health 400
