= 2025 Ambetter Health 400 =

NASCAR stock car race held in Hampton, Georgia, U.S.

Race details
- Race 2 of 36 in the 2025 NASCAR Cup Series
- Date: February 23, 2025
- Location: Atlanta Motor Speedway in Hampton, Georgia
- Course: Permanent racing facility
- Course length: 1.54 miles (2.48 km)
- Distance: 266 laps, 409.64 mi (659.68 km)
- Scheduled distance: 260 laps, 400.4 mi (644.4 km)
- Average speed: 118.384 miles per hour (190.521 km/h)

Pole position
Driver	Ryan Blaney	Team Penske
- Time: 30.908

Most laps led
Driver	Joey Logano	Team Penske
- Laps: 83

Fastest lap
Driver	A. J. Allmendinger	Kaulig Racing
- Time: 29.541

Winner
No. 20	Christopher Bell	Joe Gibbs Racing

Television in the United States
- Network: Fox
- Announcers: Mike Joy, Clint Bowyer, and Kevin Harvick
- Nielsen ratings: 4.586 million

Radio in the United States
- Radio: PRN
- Booth announcers: Brad Gillie and Mark Garrow
- Turn announcers: Doug Turnbull (1 & 2) and Pat Patterson (3 & 4)

The 2025 Ambetter Health 400 was a NASCAR Cup Series race that was held on February 23, 2025, at Atlanta Motor Speedway in Hampton, Georgia. Contested over 266 laps on the 1.54-mile-long (2.48 km) asphalt quad-oval intermediate speedway (with superspeedway rules), extended from the original 260 laps due to an overtime finish, it was the second race of the 2025 NASCAR Cup Series season.

Christopher Bell won the race. Carson Hocevar finished 2nd, and Kyle Larson finished 3rd. Ryan Blaney and Ricky Stenhouse Jr. rounded out the top five, and Denny Hamlin, Kyle Busch, Ross Chastain, Bubba Wallace, and John Hunter Nemechek rounded out the top ten.

== Report ==
=== Background ===
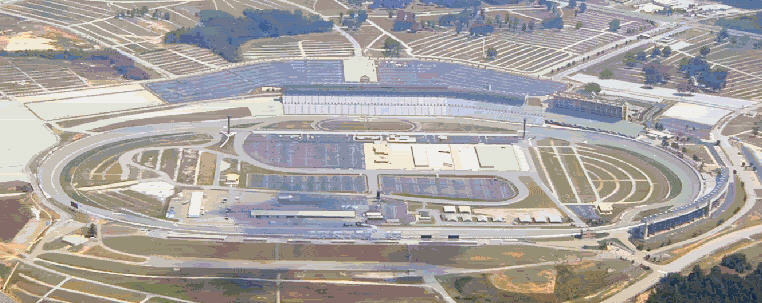
Atlanta Motor Speedway, the track where the race was held.

Atlanta Motor Speedway (formerly Atlanta International Raceway) is a 1.54-mile race track in Hampton, Georgia, United States, 20 miles (32 km) south of Atlanta. It has annually hosted NASCAR Cup Series stock car races since its inauguration in 1960.

The venue was bought by Speedway Motorsports in 1990. In 1994, 46 condominiums were built over the northeastern side of the track. In 1997, to standardize the track with Speedway Motorsports' other two intermediate ovals, the entire track was almost completely rebuilt. The frontstretch and backstretch were swapped, and the configuration of the track was changed from oval to quad-oval, with a new official length of 1.54-mile (2.48 km) where before it was 1.522-mile (2.449 km). The project made the track one of the fastest on the NASCAR circuit. In July 2021 NASCAR announced that the track would be reprofiled for the 2022 season to have 28 degrees of banking and would be narrowed from 55 to 40 feet which the track claims will turn racing at the track similar to restrictor plate superspeedways. Despite the reprofiling being criticized by drivers, construction began in August 2021 and wrapped up in December 2021. The track has seating capacity of 71,000 to 125,000 people depending on the tracks configuration.

==== Entry list ====
- (R) denotes rookie driver.
- (i) denotes driver who is ineligible for series driver points.

No.	Driver	Team	Manufacturer
01	Corey LaJoie	Rick Ware Racing	Ford
1	Ross Chastain	Trackhouse Racing	Chevrolet
2	Austin Cindric	Team Penske	Ford
3	Austin Dillon	Richard Childress Racing	Chevrolet
4	Noah Gragson	Front Row Motorsports	Ford
5	Kyle Larson	Hendrick Motorsports	Chevrolet
6	Brad Keselowski	RFK Racing	Ford
7	Justin Haley	Spire Motorsports	Chevrolet
8	Kyle Busch	Richard Childress Racing	Chevrolet
9	Chase Elliott	Hendrick Motorsports	Chevrolet
10	Ty Dillon	Kaulig Racing	Chevrolet
11	Denny Hamlin	Joe Gibbs Racing	Toyota
12	Ryan Blaney	Team Penske	Ford
16	A. J. Allmendinger	Kaulig Racing	Chevrolet
17	Chris Buescher	RFK Racing	Ford
19	Chase Briscoe	Joe Gibbs Racing	Toyota
20	Christopher Bell	Joe Gibbs Racing	Toyota
21	Josh Berry	Wood Brothers Racing	Ford
22	Joey Logano	Team Penske	Ford
23	Bubba Wallace	23XI Racing	Toyota
24	William Byron	Hendrick Motorsports	Chevrolet
34	Todd Gilliland	Front Row Motorsports	Ford
35	Riley Herbst (R)	23XI Racing	Toyota
38	Zane Smith	Front Row Motorsports	Ford
41	Cole Custer	Haas Factory Team	Ford
42	John Hunter Nemechek	Legacy Motor Club	Toyota
43	Erik Jones	Legacy Motor Club	Toyota
44	J. J. Yeley	NY Racing Team	Chevrolet
45	Tyler Reddick	23XI Racing	Toyota
47	Ricky Stenhouse Jr.	Hyak Motorsports	Chevrolet
48	Alex Bowman	Hendrick Motorsports	Chevrolet
51	Cody Ware	Rick Ware Racing	Ford
54	Ty Gibbs	Joe Gibbs Racing	Toyota
60	Ryan Preece	RFK Racing	Ford
71	Michael McDowell	Spire Motorsports	Chevrolet
77	Carson Hocevar	Spire Motorsports	Chevrolet
78	B. J. McLeod (i)	Live Fast Motorsports	Chevrolet
88	Shane van Gisbergen (R)	Trackhouse Racing	Chevrolet
99	Daniel Suárez	Trackhouse Racing	Chevrolet
Official entry list

== Qualifying ==
Ryan Blaney scored the pole for the race with a time of 30.908 and a speed of 179.371 mph (288.670 km/h).

=== Qualifying results ===
Pos	No.	Driver	Team	Manufacturer	R1	R2
1	12	Ryan Blaney	Team Penske	Ford	30.915	30.908
2	2	Austin Cindric	Team Penske	Ford	30.955	30.910
3	21	Josh Berry	Wood Brothers Racing	Ford	30.999	30.948
4	22	Joey Logano	Team Penske	Ford	30.892	31.002
5	34	Todd Gilliland	Front Row Motorsports	Ford	31.024	31.018
6	8	Kyle Busch	Richard Childress Racing	Chevrolet	31.044	31.037
7	38	Zane Smith	Front Row Motorsports	Ford	31.037	31.070
8	17	Chris Buescher	RFK Racing	Ford	31.075	31.100
9	6	Brad Keselowski	RFK Racing	Ford	31.058	31.102
10	4	Noah Gragson	Front Row Motorsports	Ford	31.065	31.131
11	60	Ryan Preece	RFK Racing	Ford	31.109	—
12	16	A. J. Allmendinger	Kaulig Racing	Chevrolet	31.128	—
13	48	Alex Bowman	Hendrick Motorsports	Chevrolet	31.155	—
14	23	Bubba Wallace	23XI Racing	Toyota	31.204	—
15	3	Austin Dillon	Richard Childress Racing	Chevrolet	31.205	—
16	24	William Byron	Hendrick Motorsports	Chevrolet	31.225	—
17	5	Kyle Larson	Hendrick Motorsports	Chevrolet	31.225	—
18	45	Tyler Reddick	23XI Racing	Toyota	31.228	—
19	9	Chase Elliott	Hendrick Motorsports	Chevrolet	31.228	—
20	10	Ty Dillon	Kaulig Racing	Chevrolet	31.238	—
21	7	Justin Haley	Spire Motorsports	Chevrolet	31.242	—
22	42	John Hunter Nemechek	Legacy Motor Club	Toyota	31.250	—
23	41	Cole Custer	Haas Factory Team	Ford	31.256	—
24	71	Michael McDowell	Spire Motorsports	Chevrolet	31.265	—
25	19	Chase Briscoe	Joe Gibbs Racing	Toyota	31.283	—
26	77	Carson Hocevar	Spire Motorsports	Chevrolet	31.292	—
27	35	Riley Herbst (R)	23XI Racing	Toyota	31.292	—
28	43	Erik Jones	Legacy Motor Club	Toyota	31.328	—
29	99	Daniel Suárez	Trackhouse Racing	Chevrolet	31.332	—
30	88	Shane van Gisbergen (R)	Trackhouse Racing	Chevrolet	31.336	—
31	51	Cody Ware	Rick Ware Racing	Ford	31.394	—
32	20	Christopher Bell	Joe Gibbs Racing	Toyota	31.424	—
33	1	Ross Chastain	Trackhouse Racing	Chevrolet	31.429	—
34	47	Ricky Stenhouse Jr.	Hyak Motorsports	Chevrolet	31.514	—
35	01	Corey LaJoie	Rick Ware Racing	Ford	31.530	—
36	54	Ty Gibbs	Joe Gibbs Racing	Toyota	31.545	—
37	11	Denny Hamlin	Joe Gibbs Racing	Toyota	31.699	—
38	78	B. J. McLeod (i)	Live Fast Motorsports	Chevrolet	31.944	—
39	44	J. J. Yeley	NY Racing Team	Chevrolet	32.255	—
Official qualifying results

== Race ==
=== Race results ===
==== Stage Results ====
Stage One Laps: 60

Pos	No	Driver	Team	Manufacturer	Points
1	21	Josh Berry	Wood Brothers Racing	Ford	10
2	2	Austin Cindric	Team Penske	Ford	9
3	24	William Byron	Hendrick Motorsports	Chevrolet	8
4	23	Bubba Wallace	23XI Racing	Toyota	7
5	9	Chase Elliott	Hendrick Motorsports	Chevrolet	6
6	45	Tyler Reddick	23XI Racing	Toyota	5
7	34	Todd Gilliland	Front Row Motorsports	Ford	4
8	12	Ryan Blaney	Team Penske	Ford	3
9	77	Carson Hocevar	Spire Motorsports	Chevrolet	2
10	22	Joey Logano	Team Penske	Ford	1
Official stage one results

Stage Two Laps: 100

Pos	No	Driver	Team	Manufacturer	Points
1	5	Kyle Larson	Hendrick Motorsports	Chevrolet	10
2	23	Bubba Wallace	23XI Racing	Toyota	9
3	22	Joey Logano	Team Penske	Ford	8
4	24	William Byron	Hendrick Motorsports	Chevrolet	7
5	48	Alex Bowman	Hendrick Motorsports	Chevrolet	6
6	45	Tyler Reddick	23XI Racing	Toyota	5
7	77	Carson Hocevar	Spire Motorsports	Chevrolet	4
8	47	Ricky Stenhouse Jr.	Hyak Motorsports	Chevrolet	3
9	2	Austin Cindric	Team Penske	Ford	2
10	4	Noah Gragson	Front Row Motorsports	Ford	1
Official stage two results

=== Final Stage Results ===
Stage Three Laps: 100

Pos	Grid	No	Driver	Team	Manufacturer	Laps	Points
1	32	20	Christopher Bell	Joe Gibbs Racing	Toyota	266	40
2	26	77	Carson Hocevar	Spire Motorsports	Chevrolet	266	41
3	17	5	Kyle Larson	Hendrick Motorsports	Chevrolet	266	44
4	1	12	Ryan Blaney	Team Penske	Ford	266	36
5	34	47	Ricky Stenhouse Jr.	Hyak Motorsports	Chevrolet	266	35
6	37	11	Denny Hamlin	Joe Gibbs Racing	Toyota	266	31
7	6	8	Kyle Busch	Richard Childress Racing	Chevrolet	266	30
8	33	1	Ross Chastain	Trackhouse Racing	Chevrolet	266	29
9	14	23	Bubba Wallace	23XI Racing	Toyota	266	44
10	22	42	John Hunter Nemechek	Legacy Motor Club	Toyota	266	27
11	7	38	Zane Smith	Front Row Motorsports	Ford	266	26
12	4	22	Joey Logano	Team Penske	Ford	266	34
13	24	71	Michael McDowell	Spire Motorsports	Chevrolet	266	24
14	12	16	A. J. Allmendinger	Kaulig Racing	Chevrolet	266	24
15	5	34	Todd Gilliland	Front Row Motorsports	Ford	266	26
16	15	3	Austin Dillon	Richard Childress Racing	Chevrolet	266	21
17	27	35	Riley Herbst (R)	23XI Racing	Toyota	266	20
18	19	9	Chase Elliott	Hendrick Motorsports	Chevrolet	266	25
19	11	60	Ryan Preece	RFK Racing	Ford	266	18
20	18	45	Tyler Reddick	23XI Racing	Toyota	266	27
21	25	19	Chase Briscoe	Joe Gibbs Racing	Toyota	266	16
22	38	78	B. J. McLeod (i)	Live Fast Motorsports	Chevrolet	266	0
23	30	88	Shane van Gisbergen (R)	Trackhouse Racing	Chevrolet	266	14
24	21	7	Justin Haley	Spire Motorsports	Chevrolet	266	13
25	3	21	Josh Berry	Wood Brothers Racing	Ford	265	22
26	13	48	Alex Bowman	Hendrick Motorsports	Chevrolet	265	17
27	16	24	William Byron	Hendrick Motorsports	Chevrolet	263	25
28	2	2	Austin Cindric	Team Penske	Ford	257	20
29	20	10	Ty Dillon	Kaulig Racing	Chevrolet	242	8
30	8	17	Chris Buescher	RFK Racing	Ford	240	7
31	28	43	Erik Jones	Legacy Motor Club	Toyota	240	6
32	36	54	Ty Gibbs	Joe Gibbs Racing	Toyota	201	5
33	29	99	Daniel Suárez	Trackhouse Racing	Chevrolet	183	4
34	10	4	Noah Gragson	Front Row Motorsports	Ford	183	4
35	31	51	Cody Ware	Rick Ware Racing	Ford	183	2
36	23	41	Cole Custer	Haas Factory Team	Ford	183	1
37	39	44	J. J. Yeley	NY Racing Team	Chevrolet	183	1
38	35	01	Corey LaJoie	Rick Ware Racing	Ford	148	1
39	9	6	Brad Keselowski	RFK Racing	Ford	147	1
Official race results

=== Race statistics ===
- Lead changes: 50 among 15 different drivers
- Cautions/Laps: 11 for 61 laps
- Red flags: 0
- Time of race: 3 hours, 27 minutes and 37 seconds
- Average speed: 118.384 miles per hour (190.521 km/h)

== Media ==
=== Television ===
Fox Sports carried the race by Fox in the United States. Mike Joy, Clint Bowyer, and three-time Atlanta winner Kevin Harvick called the race from the broadcast booth. Jamie Little and Regan Smith handled pit road for the television side, and Larry McReynolds provided insight on-site during the race.

Fox
Booth announcers	Pit reporters	In-race analyst
Lap-by-lap: Mike Joy; Color-commentator: Clint Bowyer; Color-commentator: Kevin Harvick	Jamie Little; Regan Smith	Larry McReynolds

=== Radio ===
The race was broadcast on radio by the Performance Racing Network and simulcast on Sirius XM NASCAR Radio. Brad Gillie and Mark Garrow called the race from the booth when the field races down the front stretch. Doug Turnbull called the race from atop a billboard outside of turn 2 when the field races through turns 1 and 2, and Rob Albright called the race from a billboard outside of turn 3 when the field races through turns 3 and 4. On pit road, PRN was manned by Brett McMillan, Alan Cavanna and Wendy Venturini.

PRN
Booth announcers	Turn announcers	Pit reporters
Lead announcer: Brad Gillie; Announcer: Mark Garrow	Turns 1 & 2: Doug Turnbull; Turns 3 & 4: Pat Patterson	Brett McMillan; Alan Cavanna; Wendy Venturini

== Standings after the race ==
Drivers' Championship standings

	Pos	Driver	Points
	1	Ryan Blaney	87
	2	William Byron	75 (–12)
1	3	Tyler Reddick	72 (–15)
1	4	Austin Cindric	68 (–19)
16	5	Bubba Wallace	64 (–23)
18	6	Kyle Larson	61 (–26)
2	7	John Hunter Nemechek	61 (–26)
6	8	Ricky Stenhouse Jr.	61 (–26)
4	9	Alex Bowman	59 (–28)
	10	Chase Elliott	56 (–31)
5	11	Joey Logano	55 (–32)
14	12	Christopher Bell	53 (–34)
6	13	Denny Hamlin	51 (–36)
1	14	Michael McDowell	51 (–36)
15	15	Carson Hocevar	48 (–39)
10	16	Chris Buescher	47 (–40)
Official driver's standings

Manufacturers' Championship standings

Pos	Manufacturer	Points
1	Chevrolet	75
2	Toyota	75 (–0)
3	Ford	63 (–12)

- Note: Only the first 16 positions are included for the driver standings.

Previous race: 2025 Daytona 500	NASCAR Cup Series; 2025 season	Next race: 2025 EchoPark Automotive Grand Prix
