= 2024 NASCAR Xfinity Series Championship Race =

33rd race of the 2024 NASCAR Xfinity Series

Race details
- Race 33 of 33 of the 2024 NASCAR Xfinity Series
- Date: November 9, 2024
- Official name: 26th Annual NASCAR Xfinity Series Championship Race
- Location: Phoenix Raceway in Avondale, Arizona
- Course: Permanent racing facility
- Course length: 1 miles (1.6 km)
- Distance: 213 laps, 213 mi (342 km)
- Scheduled distance: 200 laps, 200 mi (320 km)
- Average speed: 88.545 mph (142.499 km/h)

Pole position
Driver	William Sawalich	Joe Gibbs Racing
- Time: 26.832

Most laps led
Driver	Riley Herbst	Stewart–Haas Racing
- Laps: 167

Winner
No. 98	Riley Herbst	Stewart–Haas Racing

Television in the United States
- Network: The CW (produced by NBC Sports)
- Announcers: Rick Allen, Jeff Burton, and Steve Letarte.

Radio in the United States
- Radio: MRN

The 2024 NASCAR Xfinity Series Championship Race was the 33rd and final stock car race of the 2024 NASCAR Xfinity Series, the Championship 4 race, and the 26th iteration of the event. The race was held on Saturday, November 9, 2024, at Phoenix Raceway in Avondale, Arizona, a 1 mile (1.6 km) permanent tri-oval shaped racetrack. The race was originally scheduled to be contested over 200 laps, but was increased to 213 laps due to numerous overtime restarts. In an action-packed race, Riley Herbst, driving for Stewart–Haas Racing, would make a last lap pass on Justin Allgaier for the lead to earn his third career NASCAR Xfinity Series win, his second of the season, and the final win for Tony Stewart as a partner in Stewart-Haas Racing, which after dissolving of the partnership with Gene Haas became Haas Factory Team. Herbst was also the class of the field, winning both stages and leading a race-high 167 laps. To fill out the podium, Allgaier, driving for JR Motorsports, and Aric Almirola, driving for Joe Gibbs Racing, would finish 2nd and 3rd, respectively.

Despite mid race penalties and a second place finish, Allgaier claimed the 2024 NASCAR Xfinity Series championship, finishing six positions ahead of the rest of the final four drivers. This is Allgaier's first championship in the series, after previously competing in the final four six different times.

== Report ==
=== Background ===
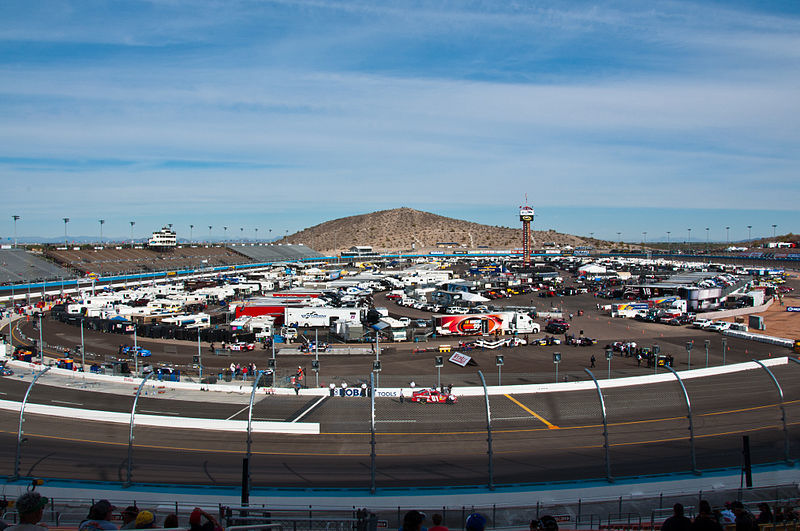
Phoenix Raceway, the circuit where the race was held.

Phoenix Raceway – also known as PIR – is a one-mile, low-banked tri-oval race track located in Avondale, Arizona. It is named after the nearby metropolitan area of Phoenix. The motorsport track opened in 1964 and currently hosts two NASCAR race weekends annually. PIR has also hosted the IndyCar Series, CART, USAC and the Rolex Sports Car Series. The raceway is currently owned and operated by International Speedway Corporation.

The raceway was originally constructed with a 2.5 mi (4.0 km) road course that ran both inside and outside of the main tri-oval. In 1991 the track was reconfigured with the current 1.51 mi (2.43 km) interior layout. PIR has an estimated grandstand seating capacity of around 67,000. Lights were installed around the track in 2004 following the addition of a second annual NASCAR race weekend.

Phoenix Raceway is home to two annual NASCAR race weekends, one of 13 facilities on the NASCAR schedule to host more than one race weekend a year. The track is both the first and last stop in the western United States, as well as the fourth and the last track on the schedule.

=== Championship drivers ===
- A. J. Allmendinger advanced after winning at Las Vegas.
- Austin Hill advanced after winning at Homestead–Miami.
- Justin Allgaier advanced by virtue of points.
- Cole Custer advanced by virtue of points.

==== Entry list ====
- (R) denotes rookie driver.
- (i) denotes driver who is ineligible for series driver points.
- (CC) denotes championship contender.
- (OP) denotes owner's playoff car.

#	Driver	Team	Make
00	Cole Custer (CC)	Stewart–Haas Racing	Ford
1	Sam Mayer	JR Motorsports	Chevrolet
2	Jesse Love (R)	Richard Childress Racing	Chevrolet
5	Anthony Alfredo	Our Motorsports	Chevrolet
07	Patrick Emerling	SS-Green Light Racing	Chevrolet
7	Justin Allgaier (CC)	JR Motorsports	Chevrolet
8	Sammy Smith	JR Motorsports	Chevrolet
9	Brandon Jones	JR Motorsports	Chevrolet
10	Daniel Dye (i)	Kaulig Racing	Chevrolet
11	Josh Williams	Kaulig Racing	Chevrolet
14	Greg Van Alst	SS-Green Light Racing	Chevrolet
15	Dylan Lupton	AM Racing	Ford
16	A. J. Allmendinger (CC)	Kaulig Racing	Chevrolet
18	Sheldon Creed	Joe Gibbs Racing	Toyota
19	William Sawalich (i)	Joe Gibbs Racing	Toyota
20	Aric Almirola (OP)	Joe Gibbs Racing	Toyota
21	Austin Hill (CC)	Richard Childress Racing	Chevrolet
26	Jeffrey Earnhardt (i)	Sam Hunt Racing	Toyota
27	Jeb Burton	Jordan Anderson Racing	Chevrolet
28	Ryan Sieg	RSS Racing	Ford
29	Blaine Perkins	RSS Racing	Ford
31	Parker Retzlaff	Jordan Anderson Racing	Chevrolet
35	Joey Gase	Joey Gase Motorsports	Chevrolet
38	Matt DiBenedetto	RSS Racing	Ford
39	Kyle Sieg	RSS Racing	Ford
42	Leland Honeyman (R)	Young's Motorsports	Chevrolet
43	Ryan Ellis	Alpha Prime Racing	Chevrolet
44	Brennan Poole	Alpha Prime Racing	Chevrolet
45	Stefan Parsons (i)	Alpha Prime Racing	Chevrolet
48	Parker Kligerman	Big Machine Racing	Chevrolet
51	Jeremy Clements	Jeremy Clements Racing	Chevrolet
53	Garrett Smithley	Joey Gase Motorsports	Ford
81	Chandler Smith	Joe Gibbs Racing	Toyota
88	Connor Zilisch	JR Motorsports	Chevrolet
91	Josh Bilicki	DGM Racing	Chevrolet
92	Dawson Cram (i)	DGM Racing	Chevrolet
97	Shane van Gisbergen (R)	Kaulig Racing	Chevrolet
98	Riley Herbst	Stewart–Haas Racing	Ford
Official entry list

== Practice ==
The first and only practice session was held on Friday, November 8, at 3:05 PM MST, and would last for 50 minutes. Jesse Love, driving for Richard Childress Racing, would set the fastest time in the session, with a lap of 27.587, and a speed of 130.496 mph (210.013 km/h).

Pos.	#	Driver	Team	Make	Time	Speed
1	2	Jesse Love	Richard Childress Racing	Chevrolet	27.587	130.496
2	7	Justin Allgaier (CC)	JR Motorsports	Chevrolet	27.700	129.964
3	88	Connor Zilisch	JR Motorsports	Chevrolet	27.706	129.936
Full practice results

== Qualifying ==
Qualifying was held on Saturday, November 9, at 2:00 PM MST. Since Phoenix Raceway is a mile oval, the qualifying system used was a single-car, one-lap system with only one round. Drivers will be on track by themselves and will have one lap to post a qualifying time, and whoever sets the fastest time won the pole.

William Sawalich, driving for Joe Gibbs Racing, would score the pole for the race, with a lap of 26.832, and a speed of 134.168 mph (215.922 km/h).

No drivers would fail to qualify.

=== Qualifying results ===
Pos.	#	Driver	Team	Make	Time	Speed
1	19	William Sawalich (i)	Joe Gibbs Racing	Toyota	26.832	134.168
2	18	Sheldon Creed	Joe Gibbs Racing	Toyota	26.980	133.432
3	98	Riley Herbst	Stewart–Haas Racing	Ford	27.070	132.989
4	81	Chandler Smith	Joe Gibbs Racing	Toyota	27.085	132.915
5	21	Austin Hill (CC)	Richard Childress Racing	Chevrolet	27.165	132.523
6	2	Jesse Love (R)	Richard Childress Racing	Chevrolet	27.202	132.343
7	00	Cole Custer (CC)	Stewart–Haas Racing	Ford	27.217	132.270
8	1	Sam Mayer	JR Motorsports	Chevrolet	27.236	132.178
9	16	A. J. Allmendinger (CC)	Kaulig Racing	Chevrolet	27.244	132.139
10	31	Parker Retzlaff	Jordan Anderson Racing	Chevrolet	27.264	132.042
11	38	Matt DiBenedetto	RSS Racing	Ford	27.300	131.868
12	5	Anthony Alfredo	Our Motorsports	Chevrolet	27.337	131.690
13	10	Daniel Dye (i)	Kaulig Racing	Chevrolet	27.345	131.651
14	45	Stefan Parsons (i)	Alpha Prime Racing	Chevrolet	27.386	131.454
15	8	Sammy Smith	JR Motorsports	Chevrolet	27.403	131.372
16	27	Jeb Burton	Jordan Anderson Racing	Chevrolet	27.413	131.325
17	97	Shane van Gisbergen (R)	Kaulig Racing	Chevrolet	27.463	131.081
18	26	Jeffrey Earnhardt (i)	Sam Hunt Racing	Toyota	27.486	130.976
19	11	Josh Williams	Kaulig Racing	Chevrolet	27.490	130.957
20	43	Ryan Ellis	Alpha Prime Racing	Chevrolet	27.526	130.785
21	88	Connor Zilisch	JR Motorsports	Chevrolet	27.530	130.766
22	51	Jeremy Clements	Jeremy Clements Racing	Chevrolet	27.553	130.657
23	28	Ryan Sieg	RSS Racing	Ford	27.570	130.577
24	15	Dylan Lupton	AM Racing	Ford	27.571	130.572
25	29	Blaine Perkins	RSS Racing	Ford	27.590	130.482
26	42	Leland Honeyman (R)	Young's Motorsports	Chevrolet	27.616	130.359
27	92	Dawson Cram (i)	DGM Racing	Chevrolet	27.674	130.086
28	44	Brennan Poole	Alpha Prime Racing	Chevrolet	27.742	129.767
29	39	Kyle Sieg	RSS Racing	Ford	27.792	129.534
30	07	Patrick Emerling	SS-Green Light Racing	Chevrolet	27.810	129.450
31	48	Parker Kligerman	Big Machine Racing	Chevrolet	27.857	129.231
32	91	Josh Bilicki	DGM Racing	Chevrolet	27.943	128.834
33	9	Brandon Jones	JR Motorsports	Chevrolet	27.994	128.599
Qualified by owner's points
34	35	Joey Gase	Joey Gase Motorsports	Chevrolet	28.321	127.114
35	14	Greg Van Alst	SS-Green Light Racing	Chevrolet	28.380	126.850
36	53	Garrett Smithley	Joey Gase Motorsports	Ford	28.535	126.161
37	7	Justin Allgaier (CC)	JR Motorsports	Chevrolet	30.261	118.965
38	20	Aric Almirola (OP)	Joe Gibbs Racing	Toyota	34.983	102.907
Official qualifying results
Official starting lineup

== Race results ==
Stage 1 Laps: 45

Pos.	#	Driver	Team	Make	Pts
1	98	Riley Herbst	Stewart–Haas Racing	Ford	10
2	81	Chandler Smith	Joe Gibbs Racing	Toyota	9
3	18	Sheldon Creed	Joe Gibbs Racing	Toyota	8
4	21	Austin Hill (CC)	Richard Childress Racing	Chevrolet	0
5	1	Sam Mayer	JR Motorsports	Chevrolet	6
6	7	Justin Allgaier (CC)	JR Motorsports	Chevrolet	0
7	00	Cole Custer (CC)	Stewart–Haas Racing	Ford	0
8	19	William Sawalich (i)	Joe Gibbs Racing	Toyota	0
9	20	Aric Almirola (OP)	Joe Gibbs Racing	Toyota	2
10	2	Jesse Love (R)	Richard Childress Racing	Chevrolet	1

Stage 2 Laps: 45

Pos.	#	Driver	Team	Make	Pts
1	98	Riley Herbst	Stewart–Haas Racing	Ford	10
2	18	Sheldon Creed	Joe Gibbs Racing	Toyota	9
3	20	Aric Almirola (OP)	Joe Gibbs Racing	Toyota	8
4	2	Jesse Love (R)	Richard Childress Racing	Chevrolet	7
5	00	Cole Custer (CC)	Stewart–Haas Racing	Ford	0
6	88	Connor Zilisch	JR Motorsports	Chevrolet	5
7	16	A. J. Allmendinger (CC)	Kaulig Racing	Chevrolet	0
8	1	Sam Mayer	JR Motorsports	Chevrolet	3
9	19	William Sawalich (i)	Joe Gibbs Racing	Toyota	0
10	7	Justin Allgaier (CC)	JR Motorsports	Chevrolet	0

Stage 3 Laps: 123

Pos.	St	#	Driver	Team	Make	Laps	Led	Status	Pts
1	3	98	Riley Herbst	Stewart–Haas Racing	Ford	213	167	Running	60
2	37	7	Justin Allgaier (CC)	JR Motorsports	Chevrolet	213	4	Running	35
3	38	20	Aric Almirola (OP)	Joe Gibbs Racing	Toyota	213	0	Running	44
4	21	88	Connor Zilisch	JR Motorsports	Chevrolet	213	0	Running	38
5	4	81	Chandler Smith	Joe Gibbs Racing	Toyota	213	0	Running	41
6	6	2	Jesse Love (R)	Richard Childress Racing	Chevrolet	213	6	Running	39
7	2	18	Sheldon Creed	Joe Gibbs Racing	Toyota	213	20	Running	47
8	7	00	Cole Custer (CC)	Stewart–Haas Racing	Ford	213	7	Running	29
9	9	16	A. J. Allmendinger (CC)	Kaulig Racing	Chevrolet	213	0	Running	28
10	5	21	Austin Hill (CC)	Richard Childress Racing	Chevrolet	213	5	Running	27
11	8	1	Sam Mayer	JR Motorsports	Chevrolet	213	0	Running	35
12	17	97	Shane van Gisbergen (R)	Kaulig Racing	Chevrolet	213	0	Running	25
13	1	19	William Sawalich (i)	Joe Gibbs Racing	Toyota	213	0	Running	0
14	31	48	Parker Kligerman	Big Machine Racing	Chevrolet	213	2	Running	23
15	15	8	Sammy Smith	JR Motorsports	Chevrolet	213	0	Running	22
16	16	27	Jeb Burton	Jordan Anderson Racing	Chevrolet	213	0	Running	21
17	13	10	Daniel Dye (i)	Kaulig Racing	Chevrolet	213	2	Running	0
18	33	9	Brandon Jones	JR Motorsports	Chevrolet	213	0	Running	19
19	24	15	Dylan Lupton	AM Racing	Ford	213	0	Running	18
20	22	51	Jeremy Clements	Jeremy Clements Racing	Chevrolet	213	0	Running	17
21	32	91	Josh Bilicki	DGM Racing	Chevrolet	213	0	Running	16
22	25	29	Blaine Perkins	RSS Racing	Ford	213	0	Running	15
23	23	28	Ryan Sieg	RSS Racing	Ford	213	0	Running	14
24	28	44	Brennan Poole	Alpha Prime Racing	Chevrolet	213	0	Running	13
25	20	43	Ryan Ellis	Alpha Prime Racing	Chevrolet	213	0	Running	12
26	11	38	Matt DiBenedetto	RSS Racing	Ford	213	0	Running	11
27	34	35	Joey Gase	Joey Gase Motorsports	Chevrolet	213	0	Running	10
28	30	07	Patrick Emerling	SS-Green Light Racing	Chevrolet	212	0	Running	9
29	29	39	Kyle Sieg	RSS Racing	Ford	212	0	Running	8
30	36	53	Garrett Smithley	Joey Gase Motorsports	Ford	212	0	Running	7
31	26	42	Leland Honeyman (R)	Young's Motorsports	Chevrolet	210	0	Running	6
32	27	92	Dawson Cram (i)	DGM Racing	Chevrolet	209	0	Running	0
33	19	11	Josh Williams	Kaulig Racing	Chevrolet	208	0	Running	4
34	10	31	Parker Retzlaff	Jordan Anderson Racing	Chevrolet	204	0	Accident	3
35	18	26	Jeffrey Earnhardt (i)	Sam Hunt Racing	Toyota	169	0	Engine	0
36	12	5	Anthony Alfredo	Our Motorsports	Chevrolet	152	0	Accident	1
37	35	14	Greg Van Alst	SS-Green Light Racing	Chevrolet	108	0	Suspension	1
38	14	45	Stefan Parsons (i)	Alpha Prime Racing	Chevrolet	61	0	Accident	0
Official race results

== Standings after the race ==
Drivers' Championship standings

	Pos	Driver	Points
3	1	Justin Allgaier	4,035
1	2	Cole Custer	4,029 (–6)
1	3	A. J. Allmendinger	4,028 (–7)
3	4	Austin Hill	4,027 (–8)
	5	Chandler Smith	2,314 (–1,721)
	6	Sheldon Creed	2,264 (–1,771)
1	7	Riley Herbst	2,254 (–1,781)
1	8	Jesse Love	2,247 (–1,788)
	9	Sam Mayer	2,205 (–1,830)
	10	Parker Kligerman	2,190 (–1,845)
	11	Sammy Smith	2,185 (–1,850)
	12	Shane van Gisbergen	2,157 (–1,878)
Official driver's standings

Manufacturers' Championship standings

Pos	Manufacturer	Points
1	Chevrolet	1,228
2	Toyota	1,172 (–56)
3	Ford	1,072 (–156)

- Note: Only the first 12 positions are included for the driver standings.

Previous race: 2024 National Debt Relief 250	NASCAR Xfinity Series; 2024 season	Next race: 2025 United Rentals 300
