= Riley Herbst =

American racing driver (born 1999)

- Herbst at Las Vegas Motor Speedway in 2026
- Born: Riley Dederick Kern Herbst; February 24, 1999 (age 27); Las Vegas, Nevada, U.S.
- Achievements: 2023, 2024 Baja 1000 Trophy Truck Spec Class Winner
- Awards: 2017 ARCA Racing Series Rookie of the Year

NASCAR Cup Series career
- 79 races run over 4 years
- Car no., team: No. 84 (Legacy Motor Club)
- 2026 position: 30th
- Best finish: 30th (2026)
- First race: 2023 Daytona 500 (Daytona)
- Last race: 2026 Season Finale 400 (Homestead)
Wins	Top tens	Poles
0	5	0

NASCAR O'Reilly Auto Parts Series career
- 179 races run over 8 years
- 2025 position: 81st
- Best finish: 7th (2024)
- First race: 2018 Iowa 250 (Iowa)
- Last race: 2025 Mission 200 at The Glen (Watkins Glen)
- First win: 2023 Alsco Uniforms 302 (Las Vegas)
- Last win: 2024 NASCAR Xfinity Series Championship Race (Phoenix)
Wins	Top tens	Poles
3	88	2

NASCAR FedEx Freight Truck Series career
- 11 races run over 5 years
- 2022 position: 93rd
- Best finish: 39th (2018)
- First race: 2018 Eaton 200 (Gateway)
- Last race: 2022 Heart of America 200 (Kansas)
Wins	Top tens	Poles
0	4	1

NASCAR Canada Series career
- 1 race run over 1 year
- 2019 position: 43rd
- Best finish: 43rd (2019)
- First race: 2019 Clarington 200 (Mosport)
Wins	Top tens	Poles
0	0	0

ARCA Menards Series career
- 52 races run over 5 years
- Best finish: 3rd (2018)
- First race: 2017 Music City 200 (Nashville Fairgrounds)
- Last race: 2021 Clean Harbors 100 at The Glen (Watkins Glen)
- First win: 2017 General Tire #AnywhereIsPossible 200 (Pocono)
- Last win: 2020 VizCom 200 (Michigan)
Wins	Top tens	Poles
2	35	1

ARCA Menards Series East career
- 8 races run over 4 years
- Best finish: 22nd (2019)
- First race: 2016 Jet Tools 150 (New Smyrna)
- Last race: 2019 Great Outdoors RV Superstore 100 (Watkins Glen)
Wins	Top tens	Poles
0	6	0

ARCA Menards Series West career
- 19 races run over 4 years
- Best finish: 7th (2016)
- First race: 2016 Toyota/NAPA Auto Parts 150 (Irwindale)
- Last race: 2023 General Tire 200 (Sonoma)
Wins	Top tens	Poles
0	14	0
- Statistics up to date as of November 8, 2026.

Riley Dederick Kern Herbst (born February 24, 1999) is an American professional stock car racing driver. He competes full-time in the NASCAR Cup Series, driving the No. 84 Toyota Camry XSE for Legacy Motor Club.

== Racing career ==
=== Early years ===
Herbst began racing karts as a five-year-old. He progressed through legends, Speed Trucks, and Super Late Models.

In 2015, Herbst raced weekly at Irwindale Speedway in a Super Late Model as well as winning the track's Speed Trucks championship. In 2016, he raced several NASCAR East and West series races along with racing a Super Late Model at Irwindale.

=== Off-road racing ===
Herbst is from a family rooted in off-road racing. His father Troy, grandfather Jerry, and uncles Ed and Tim participate in desert racing such as the Baja 500 and Baja 1000. The quartet was inducted into the Southern Nevada Sports Hall of Fame in 2014.

During his youth, Herbst competed in the Lucas Oil Off Road Racing Series' Junior 1 Kart division.

In 2020, Herbst joined his cousins Pierce and Thor at the 2020 Baja 1000, where they finished second in the Trophy Truck Spec class. The trio also ran the 2021 1000 and placed ninth.

Herbst, his father, Troy, and Jordan Dean won the Trophy Truck Spec class in the 2023 Baja 1000, finishing eighth overall.

=== ARCA Menards Series ===
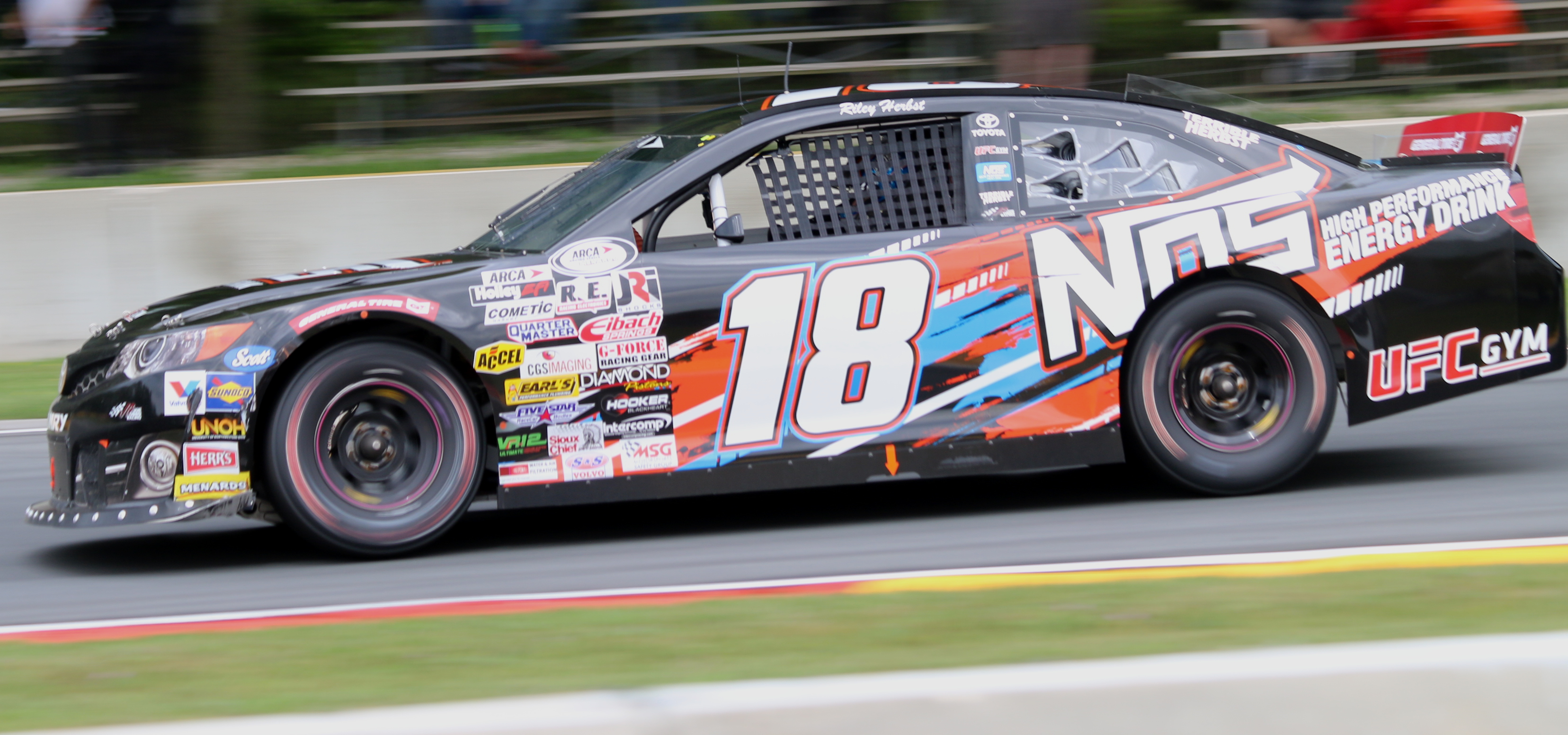
Herbst's No. 18 ARCA car at Road America in 2017

In 2017, Herbst drove full-time for Joe Gibbs Racing in the No. 18 Toyota in the ARCA Racing Series. He drove the No. 81 in the first race but withdrew due to age limitations. He then moved to the No. 18 for the rest of the season. He won one race at Pocono, earned five top-fives, ten top-tens, and finished seventh in the final standings. He also claimed the series' Rookie of the Year award over Gus Dean after passing Dean in the season's final event. For the 2019 season, he split JGR's No. 18 with Ty Gibbs.

=== Xfinity Series ===
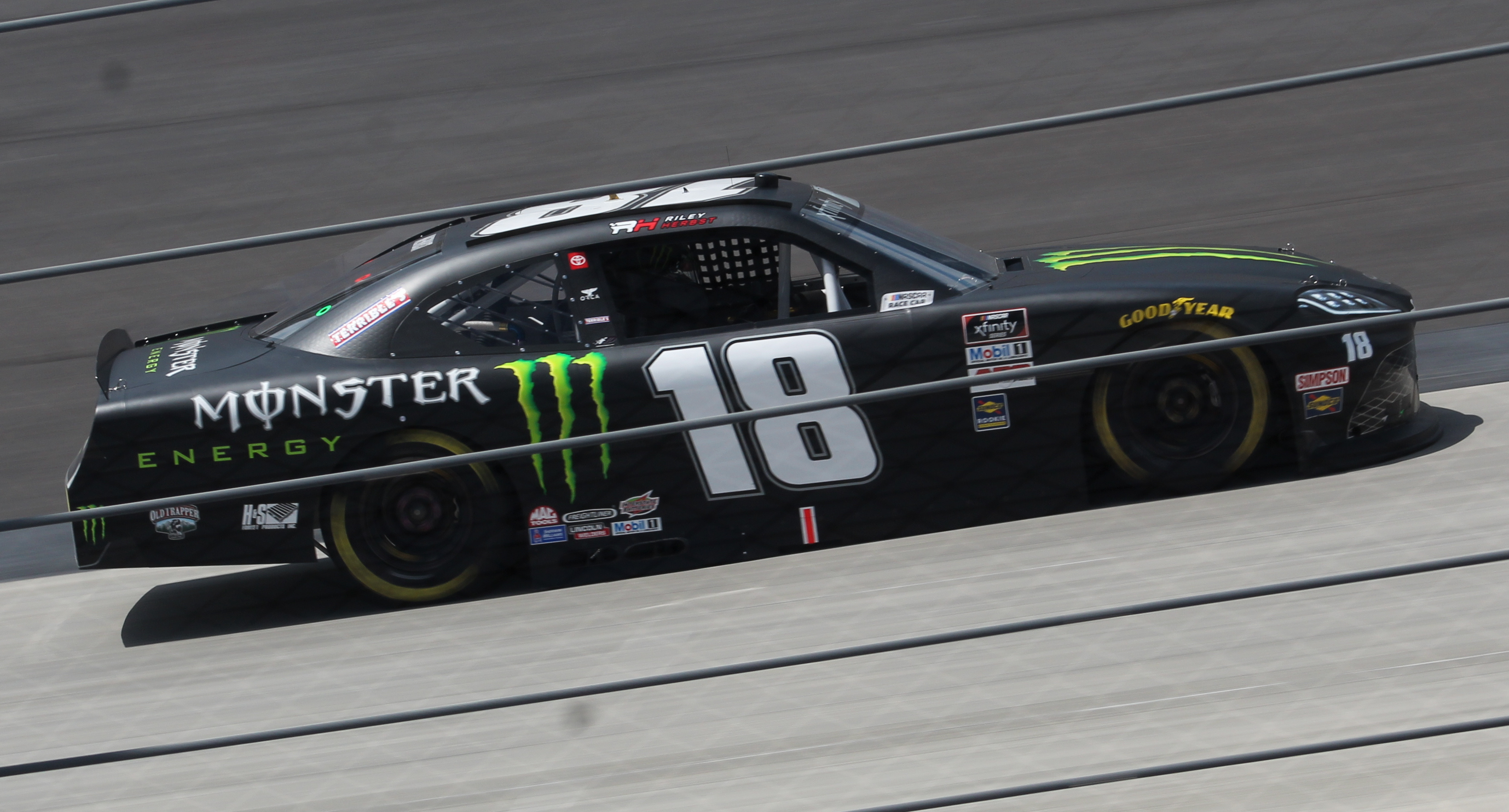
Herbst's No. 18 Monster Energy car at Dover International Speedway in 2020

In May 2018, Herbst was named to the 2018 NASCAR Next class. In June 2018, Herbst joined JGR for his NASCAR Xfinity Series debut at Iowa Speedway. For the 2019 season, he split JGR's No. 18 with Jeffrey Earnhardt, Kyle Busch, and Denny Hamlin.

In 2020, Herbst assumed full-time driving duties in the No. 18. He qualified for the playoffs but was eliminated following the first round. He ended the year with a twelfth place points finish, four top-five finishes, seventeen top tens, and the best finish of second at Auto Club Speedway and Kentucky Speedway. After the season, JGR signed Daniel Hemric to drive the No. 18 full-time starting in 2021, leaving Herbst without a ride.

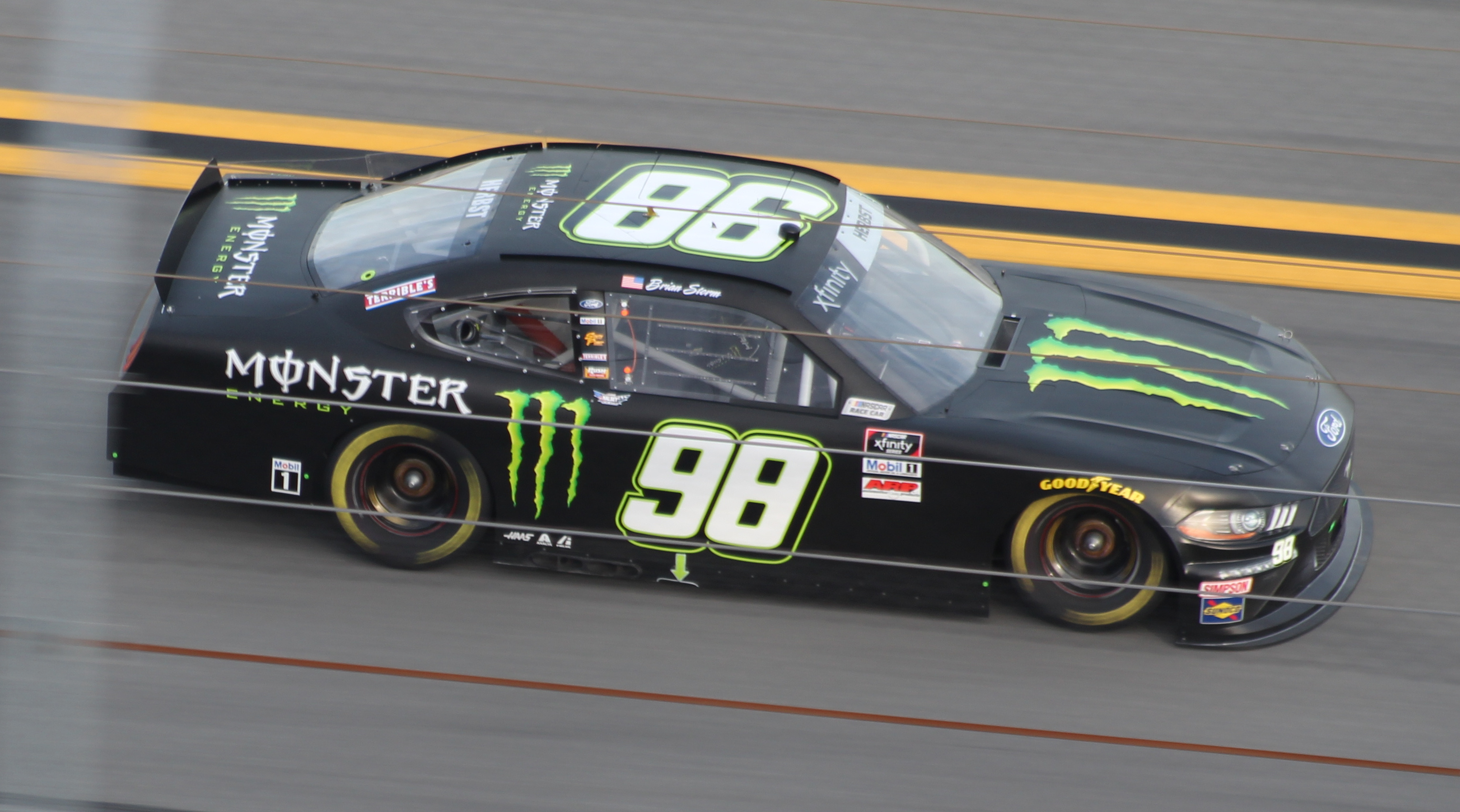
Herbst's No. 98 car at Daytona International Speedway in 2021

On December 10, 2020, Stewart–Haas Racing announced Herbst would drive the No. 98 Ford beginning with the 2021 season. After a rough start to the season that saw his involvement in wrecks—none of which were of his doing—in three of the first four races, he rebounded with a fourth-place finish at Phoenix Raceway. In 2022, Herbst would have his best season in his Xfinity career; his eight top-fives and twenty top-ten finishes during the season were all career-highs.

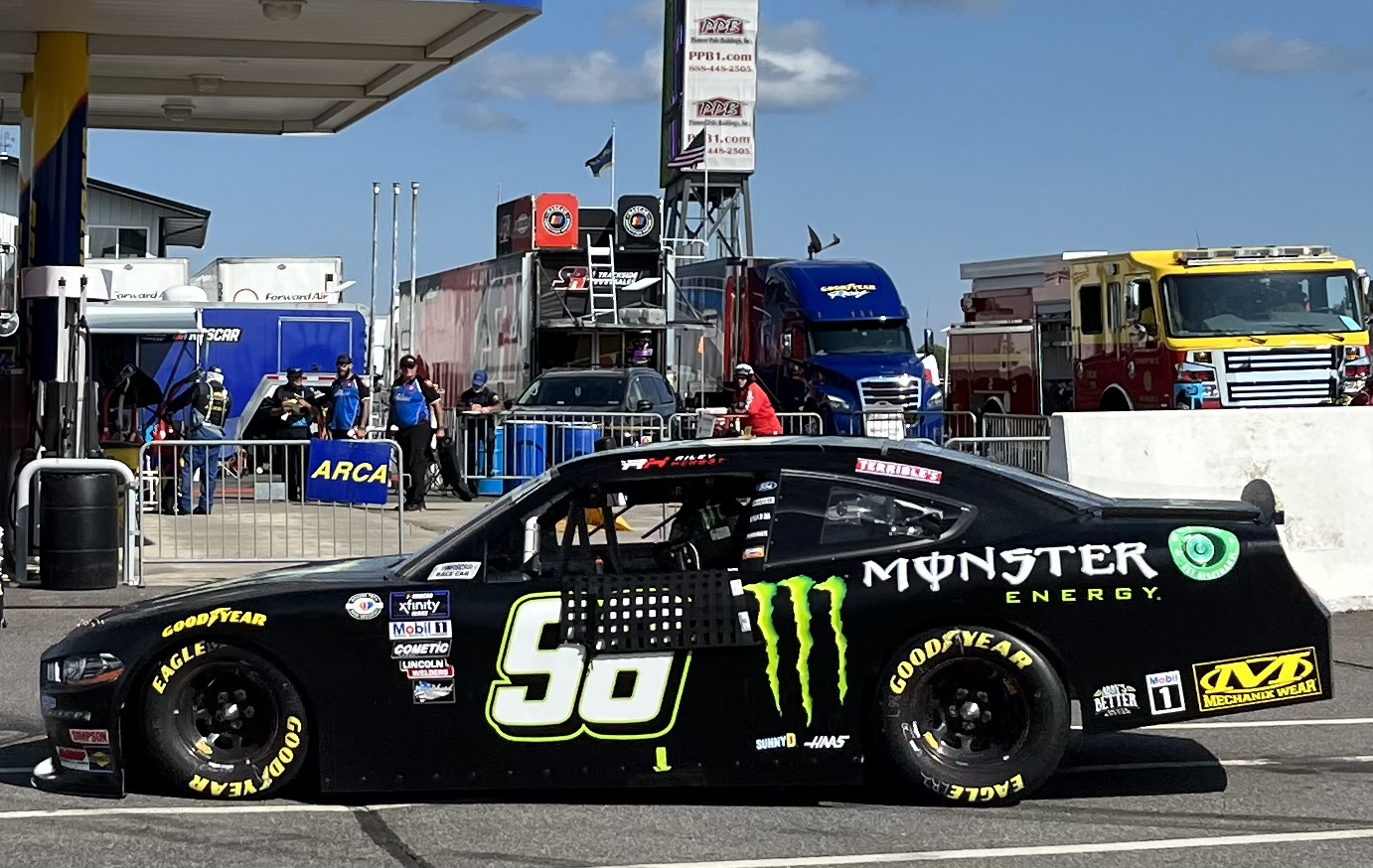
Herbst after qualifying at Pocono Raceway in 2023

Herbst began the 2023 season with a sixth-place finish at Daytona. He then scored five more consecutive top-ten finishes. Despite missing the playoffs, Herbst scored his first career win at Las Vegas. The end to his season was strong, as the win was part of a five-race streak of top-five finishes.

Remaining at SHR for 2024, Herbst repeated the previous year's result to finish sixth at Daytona. Having run in the top positions throughout the following race at Atlanta, he ran out of fuel whilst sitting second with a few laps left, eventually dropping to 15th. Herbst scored his first win of the season at Indianapolis after he made a spectacular last lap pass on Aric Almirola. Unfortunately, he would be knocked out of the first round of the playoffs. At Phoenix, Herbst gave Stewart–Haas Racing its final race win; he finished seventh in the points standings.

On May 28, 2024, Stewart–Haas Racing announced it would shut down its NASCAR operations at the end of the season.

=== Camping World Truck Series ===
In 2018, Herbst was tabbed to drive for Kyle Busch Motorsports. He made his NASCAR Camping World Truck Series debut in the No. 51 at Gateway Motorsports Park finishing 8th and the No. 46 at his home track, Las Vegas Motor Speedway finishing 29th.

On October 12, 2019, Herbst was passing Johnny Sauter on the final lap for the win in the tri-oval at Talladega Superspeedway but was blocked across the apron, forcing NASCAR to penalize Sauter and give Spencer Boyd his first career win. Herbst would finish third.

Herbst returned to the Truck Series in 2021 for the Daytona road course race, driving the No. 17 Ford for David Gilliland Racing. He returned to the No. 17 truck for Daytona and Kansas in 2022.

=== Cup Series ===
On January 31, 2023, Herbst was announced to have signed with Rick Ware Racing to make his Cup Series debut in the No. 15 Ford at the 2023 Daytona 500. Herbst would go on to finish tenth in his debut despite being involved in a multi-car crash late in the race. He is also one of five drivers in NASCAR history to score a top-ten in their first Cup, Xfinity, and Truck Series starts. He made another start for RWR at Talladega Superspeedway, where he started 36th and finished twentieth. He competed for Front Row Motorsports at the 2023 Coke Zero Sugar 400 at Daytona in the No. 36 Ford. He started in sixth but fell to the back at the end of stage 1 before getting caught up in the big one at the end of stage 2. He would be classified in 38th place. Herbst would compete for Front Row in the No. 36 again in the fall Talladega race that same year. Herbst would start in sixth again, but this time was able to finish the race despite crashing again. He was also in contention for the win as he ran in fourth for the closing laps of the race and pushed Ryan Blaney to the lead on the final lap and almost pushed Kevin Harvick to the victory before he got spun by Corey LaJoie and took out most of the field coming out of the tri-oval. Herbst would come across the line in ninth (originally tenth before Harvick got disqualified), his best career finish in the Cup Series.

Herbst signed with Rick Ware for the 2024 Daytona 500, driving the No. 15 again but this time with Monster Energy as a sponsor instead of SunnyD, which was his sponsor in the previous year's race. Herbst qualified in twelfth but finished in twentieth in the Duels, which started him in 36th for the race. Herbst was at one point in the top ten during the race but ultimately finished in 24th. Herbst ran another race that same year in the No. 15 at Kansas, starting 37th and finishing 35th, two laps down. Herbst ran two more races for Rick Ware at Nashville and Richmond, finishing 37th and 33rd.

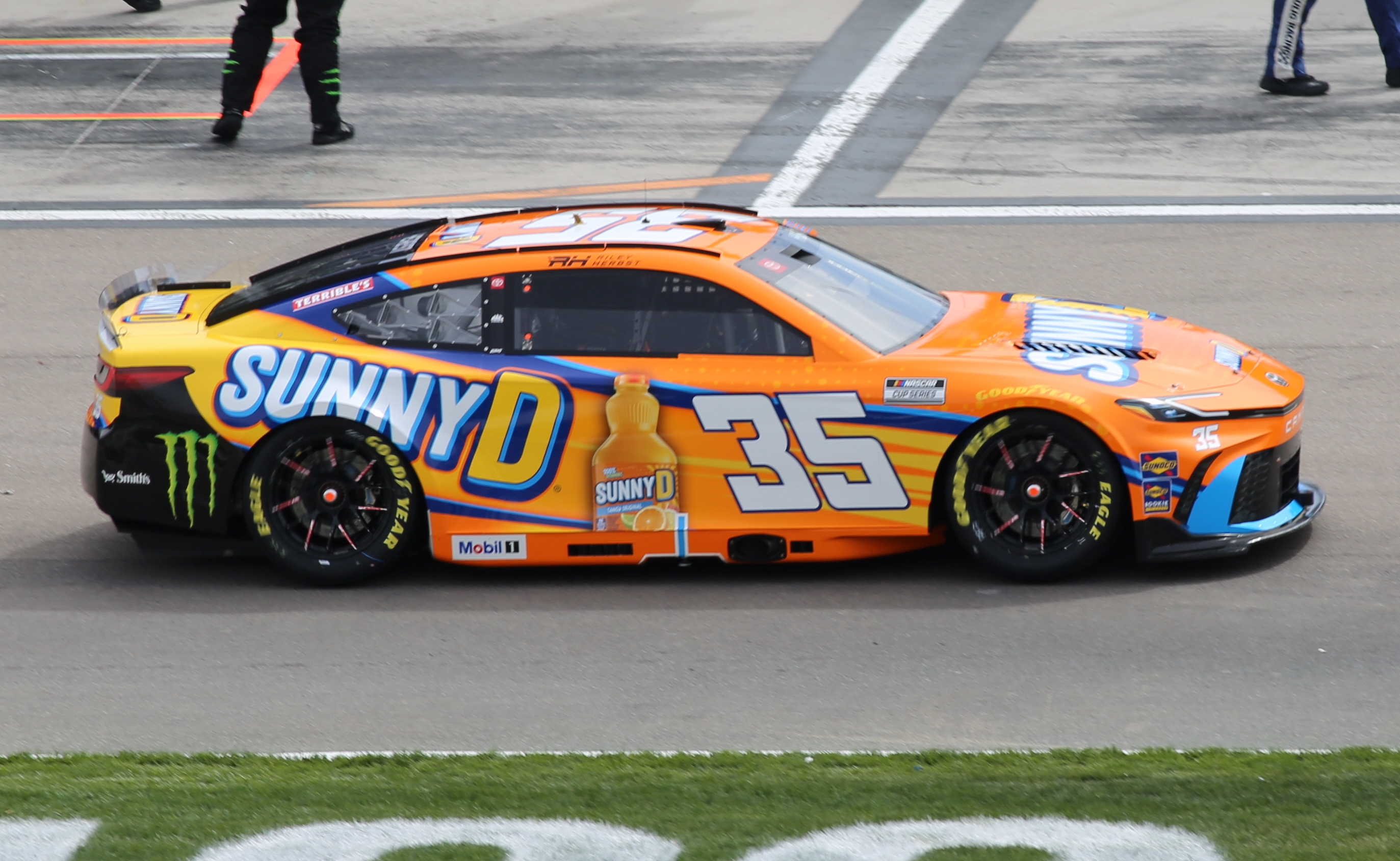
Herbst's No. 35 car at Las Vegas Motor Speedway in 2025

On November 20, 2024, 23XI Racing announced that Herbst would drive the No. 35 Toyota full-time for the 2025 season. Herbst ran long-time partner Monster Energy as his sponsor. He started the season with a seventeenth-place at the 2025 Daytona 500. Herbst struggled throughout the season, failing to score a single top-ten finish and only finishing inside the top-twenty-eight times with a best finish of fourteenth at Texas, and finished 35th in the final standings. Shortly after the Charlotte Roval race, the No. 35 car was disqualified for failing post-race height inspection.

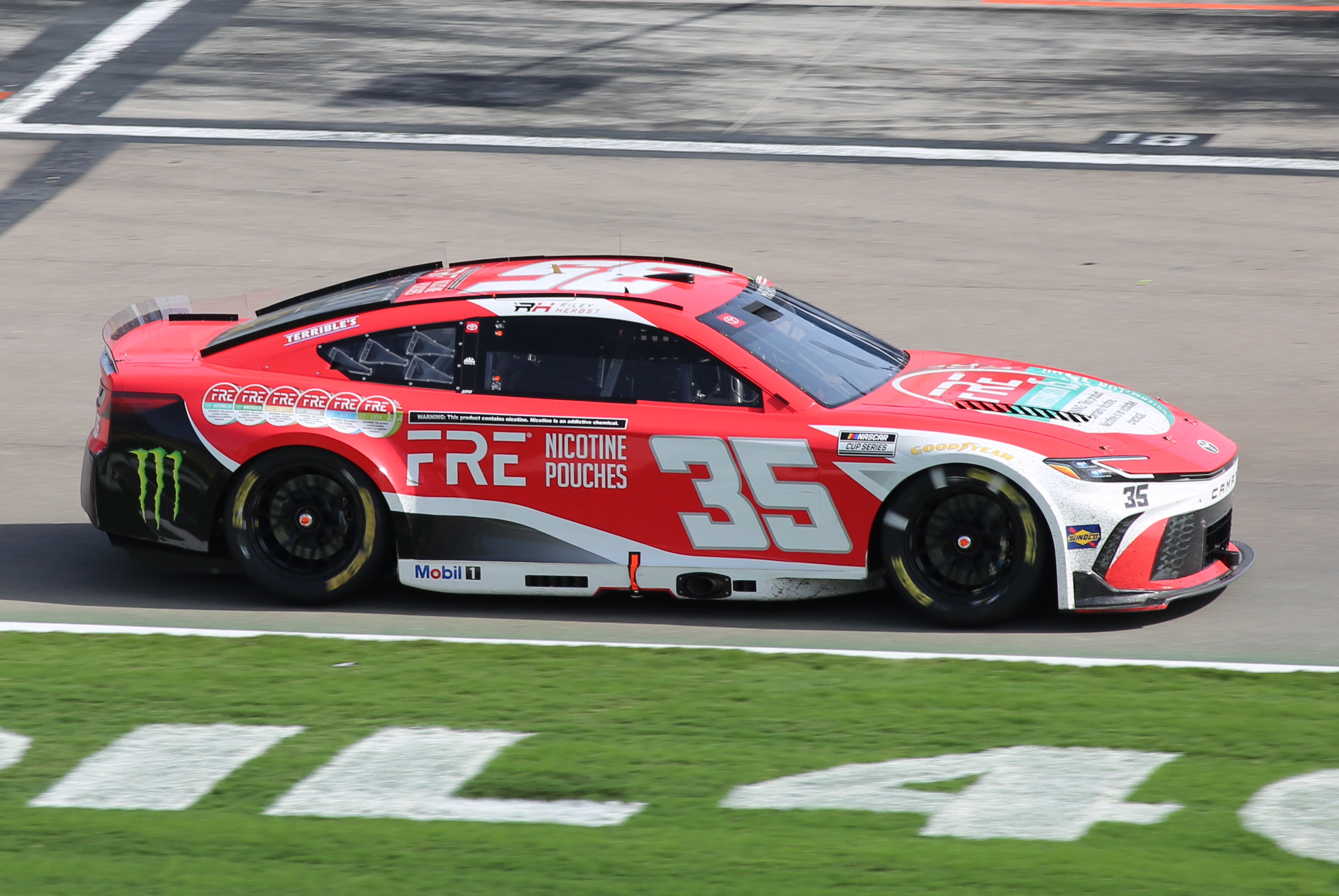
Herbst's No. 35 car at Las Vegas Motor Speedway in 2026

Herbst started the 2026 season with an eighth-place finish at the 2026 Daytona 500. On May 30th, it was confirmed that Corey Heim would replace Herbst in the 35 car at 23XI. On September 3, it was announced that Herbst would join Legacy Motor Club, driving their No. 84, with Monster returning as his sponsor.

== Personal life ==
Herbst's family owns the Terrible Herbst company, a privately held gas station and convenience store chain in Las Vegas and Southern Utah.

== Motorsports career results ==
=== Stock car career summary ===
Season	Series	Team	Races	Wins	Top 5	Top 10	Points	Position
2015	CARS Super Late Model Tour	LFR Development Group	1	0	0	0	22	47th
2016	CARS Super Late Model Tour	Fury Race Cars	1	0	1	1	31	40th
2016	NASCAR K&N Pro Series East	Bill McAnally Racing	3	0	0	3	105	29th
2016	NASCAR K&N Pro Series West	Bill McAnally Racing	14	0	7	10	510	7th
2017	ARCA Racing Series	Joe Gibbs Racing	19	1	6	10	4555	5th
2017	NASCAR K&N Pro Series East	MDM Motorsports	1	0	0	1	37	47th
2017	NASCAR K&N Pro Series West	Bill McAnally Racing	2	0	1	2	76	28th
2018	ARCA Racing Series	Joe Gibbs Racing	20	0	8	15	4595	**3rd**
2018	CARS Late Model Stock Car Tour	Glen Moffitt	1	0	0	0	12	73rd
2018	NASCAR Camping World Truck Series	Kyle Busch Motorsports	2	0	0	1	81	39th
2018	NASCAR Camping World Truck Series	DGR-Crosley	2	0	0	0	81	39th
2018	NASCAR K&N Pro Series East	DGR-Crosley	1	0	1	1	41	40th
2018	NASCAR Xfinity Series	Joe Gibbs Racing	1	0	0	1	0	NC†
2019	ARCA Menards Series	Joe Gibbs Racing	8	0	2	5	1485	16th
2019	CARS Late Model Stock Car Tour	Nelson Motorsports	1	0	1	1	28	40th
2019	NASCAR Gander Outdoors Truck Series	Kyle Busch Motorsports	3	0	1	2	61	44th
2019	NASCAR K&N Pro Series East	DGR-Crosley	3	0	0	1	96	22nd
2019	NASCAR K&N Pro Series West	Levin Racing with Joe Gibbs Racing	1	0	0	1	35	48th
2019	NASCAR Pinty's Series	DJK Racing	1	0	0	0	24	43rd
2019	NASCAR Xfinity Series	Joe Gibbs Racing	9	0	0	3	0	NC†
2020	ARCA Menards Series	Joe Gibbs Racing	4	1	3	4	167	24th
2020	NASCAR Gander Outdoors Truck Series	Kyle Busch Motorsports	1	0	0	0	0	NC†
2020	NASCAR Xfinity Series	Joe Gibbs Racing	33	0	4	17	2152	12th
2021	ARCA Menards Series	David Gilliland Racing	1	0	0	1	38	79th
2021	NASCAR Camping World Truck Series	David Gilliland Racing	1	0	1	1	0	NC†
2021	NASCAR Xfinity Series	Stewart–Haas Racing	33	0	5	13	2157	11th
2022	NASCAR Camping World Truck Series	David Gilliland Racing	2	0	0	0	0	NC†
2022	NASCAR Xfinity Series	Stewart–Haas Racing	33	0	8	20	2197	10th
2023	ARCA Menards Series West	Jerry Pitts Racing	2	0	1	1	68	27th
2023	NASCAR Cup Series	Rick Ware Racing	2	0	0	1	0	NC†
2023	NASCAR Cup Series	Front Row Motorsports	2	0	0	1	0	NC†
2023	NASCAR Xfinity Series	Stewart–Haas Racing	33	1	10	17	904	13th
2024	NASCAR Cup Series	Rick Ware Racing	4	0	0	0	0	NC†
2024	NASCAR Xfinity Series	Stewart–Haas Racing	33	2	7	15	2254	7th
2025	NASCAR Cup Series	23XI Racing	36	0	0	0	399	35th
2025	NASCAR Xfinity Series	Joe Gibbs Racing	4	0	2	2	0	NC†
2026	NASCAR Cup Series	23XI Racing	31	0	0	3	465*	30th*
2027	NASCAR Cup Series	Legacy Motor Club					TBD	TBD

^{†} As Herbst was a guest driver, he was ineligible for championship points.

=== NASCAR ===
(key) (Bold – Pole position awarded by qualifying time. Italics – Pole position earned by points standings or practice time. * – Most laps led.)

==== Cup Series ====
NASCAR Cup Series results
Year	Team	No.	Make	1	2	3	4	5	6	7	8	9	10	11	12	13	14	15	16	17	18	19	20	21	22	23	24	25	26	27	28	29	30	31	32	33	34	35	36	NCSC	Pts	Ref
2023	Rick Ware Racing	15	Ford	DAY; 10	CAL	LVS	PHO	ATL	COA	RCH	BRD	MAR	TAL; 20	DOV	KAN	DAR	CLT	GTW	SON	NSH	CSC	ATL	NHA	POC	RCH	MCH	IRC	GLN												45th	0^{1}	
2023	Front Row Motorsports	36	Ford																										DAY; 38	DAR	KAN	BRI	TEX	TAL; 9	ROV	LVS	HOM	MAR	PHO	45th	0^{1}	
2024	Rick Ware Racing	15	Ford	DAY; 24	ATL	LVS	PHO	BRI	COA	RCH	MAR	TEX	TAL	DOV	KAN; 35	DAR	CLT	GTW	SON	IOW	NHA	NSH; 37	CSC	POC	IND	RCH; 33	MCH	DAY	DAR	ATL	GLN	BRI	KAN	TAL	ROV	LVS	HOM	MAR	PHO	55th	0^{1}	
2025	23XI Racing	35	Toyota	DAY; 17	ATL; 17	COA; 17	PHO; 37	LVS; 19	HOM; 33	MAR; 31	DAR; 34	BRI; 28	TAL; 22	TEX; 14	KAN; 27	CLT; 28	NSH; 24	MCH; 25	MXC; 29	POC; 37	ATL; 28	CSC; 17	SON; 25	DOV; 24	IND; 26	IOW; 30	GLN; 24	RCH; 31	DAY; 40	DAR; 28	GTW; 31	BRI; 18	NHA; 22	KAN; 22	ROV; 37	LVS; 17	TAL; 32	MAR; 36	PHO; 23	35th	399	
2026	23XI Racing	35	Toyota	DAY; 8	ATL; 33	COA; 23	PHO; 18	LVS; 23	DAR; 35	MAR; 35	BRI; 21	KAN; 14	TAL; 25	TEX; 11	GLN; 26	CLT; 21	NSH; 17	MCH; 13	POC; 16	COR; 8	SON; 30	CHI; 10	ATL; 35	NWS; 18	IND; 36	IOW; 21	RCH; 24	NHA; 34	DAY; QL^{†}	DAR; 30	GTW; 34	BRI; 34	KAN; 25	LVS; 18	CLT; 18	PHO; 32	TAL; 26	MAR; 32	HOM; 33	30th	495	
^{†} Qualified but replaced by Harrison Burton

===== Daytona 500 =====
Year	Team	Manufacturer	Start	Finish
2023	Rick Ware Racing	Ford	38	10
2024	Rick Ware Racing	Ford	36	24
2025	23XI Racing	Toyota	24	17
2026	23XI Racing	Toyota	28	8

==== Xfinity Series ====
NASCAR Xfinity Series results
Year	Team	No.	Make	1	2	3	4	5	6	7	8	9	10	11	12	13	14	15	16	17	18	19	20	21	22	23	24	25	26	27	28	29	30	31	32	33	NXSC	Pts	Ref
2018	Joe Gibbs Racing	18	Toyota	DAY	ATL	LVS	PHO	CAL	TEX	BRI	RCH	TAL	DOV	CLT	POC	MCH	IOW; 6	CHI	DAY	KEN	NHA	IOW	GLN	MOH	BRI	ROA	DAR	IND	LVS	RCH	ROV	DOV	KAN	TEX	PHO	HOM	100th	0^{1}	
2019	Joe Gibbs Racing	18	Toyota	DAY	ATL	LVS	PHO	CAL	TEX	BRI	RCH; 9	TAL	DOV; 15	CLT	POC	MCH; 37	IOW	CHI; 10	DAY; 18	KEN; 11	NHA	IOW; 13	GLN	MOH	BRI	ROA	DAR	IND	LVS; 9	RCH	ROV	DOV	KAN	TEX	PHO; 30	HOM	88th	0^{1}	
2020	Joe Gibbs Racing	18	Toyota	DAY; 32	LVS; 9	CAL; 2	PHO; 10	DAR; 18	CLT; 12	BRI; 27	ATL; 17	HOM; 10	HOM; 9	TAL; 37	POC; 9	IRC; 33	KEN; 2	KEN; 10	TEX; 36	KAN; 9	ROA; 23	DRC; 7	DOV; 6	DOV; 9	DAY; 4	DAR; 4	RCH; 10	RCH; 34	BRI; 10	LVS; 12	TAL; 35	ROV; 12	KAN; 30	TEX; 32	MAR; 6	PHO; 11	12th	2152	
2021	Stewart–Haas Racing	98	Ford	DAY; 26	DRC; 39	HOM; 11	LVS; 40	PHO; 4	ATL; 6	MAR; 29	TAL; 4	DAR; 28	DOV; 17	COA; 16	**CLT**; 12	MOH; 21	TEX; 12	NSH; 10	POC; 35	ROA; 7	ATL; 19	NHA; 10	GLN; 13	IRC; 8	MCH; 7	DAY; 10	DAR; 38	RCH; 5	BRI; 3	LVS; 33	TAL; 27*	ROV; 34	TEX; 12	KAN; 13	MAR; 10	PHO; 4	11th	2157	
2022	Stewart–Haas Racing	98	Ford	DAY; 4	CAL; 9	LVS; 14	PHO; 38	ATL; 4	COA; 26	RCH; 5	MAR; 6	TAL; 7	DOV; 9	DAR; 3	TEX; 8	CLT; 25	PIR; 35	**NSH**; 3	ROA; 7	ATL; 9	NHA; 30	POC; 12	IRC; 6	MCH; 9	GLN; 7	DAY; 15	DAR; 34	KAN; 16	BRI; 5	TEX; 5	TAL; 11	ROV; 32	LVS; 18	HOM; 8	MAR; 3	PHO; 7	10th	2197	
2023	Stewart–Haas Racing	98	Ford	DAY; 6	CAL; 7	LVS; 8	PHO; 4	ATL; 5	COA; 10	RCH; 23	MAR; 30	TAL; 23	DOV; 21	DAR; 38	CLT; 14	PIR; 32	SON; 15	NSH; 2	CSC; 24	ATL; 36	NHA; 20	POC; 4	ROA; 5	MCH; 6	IRC; 12	GLN; 35	DAY; 24	DAR; 6	KAN; 23	BRI; 8	TEX; 37	ROV; 4	LVS; 1*	HOM; 2	MAR; 4	PHO; 4	13th	904	
2024	Stewart–Haas Racing	98	Ford	DAY; 6	ATL; 15	LVS; 5	PHO; 24	COA; 34	RCH; 13	MAR; 25	TEX; 27	TAL; 2	DOV; 16	DAR; 7	CLT; 38	PIR; 10	SON; 13	IOW; 2	NHA; 8	NSH; 6	CSC; 28	POC; 11	IND; 1	MCH; 38	DAY; 4	DAR; 35	ATL; 26	GLN; 13	BRI; 13	KAN; 10	TAL; 3	ROV; 32	LVS; 7	HOM; 6	MAR; 11	PHO; 1*	7th	2254	
2025	Joe Gibbs Racing	19	Toyota	DAY	ATL	COA; 13	PHO	LVS	HOM	MAR	DAR	BRI	CAR	TAL	TEX; 3	CLT	NSH	MXC	POC	ATL	CSC	SON; 5	DOV	IND	IOW	GLN; 36	DAY	PIR	GTW	BRI	KAN	ROV	LVS	TAL	MAR	PHO	81st	0^{1}	

==== Camping World Truck Series ====
NASCAR Camping World Truck Series results
Year	Team	No.	Make	1	2	3	4	5	6	7	8	9	10	11	12	13	14	15	16	17	18	19	20	21	22	23	NCWTC	Pts	Ref
2018	Kyle Busch Motorsports	51	Toyota	DAY	ATL	LVS	MAR	DOV	KAN	CLT	TEX	IOW	GTW; 8	CHI	KEN	ELD	POC	MCH									39th	81	
2018	DGR-Crosley	54	Toyota																BRI; 15	MSP					PHO; 15	HOM	39th	81	
2018	Kyle Busch Motorsports	46	Toyota																		LVS; 29	TAL	MAR	TEX			39th	81	
2019	Kyle Busch Motorsports	46	Toyota	DAY	ATL	LVS	MAR	TEX	DOV	KAN; 9	CLT	TEX	IOW; 15	GTW	CHI	KEN	POC	ELD	MCH	BRI	MSP	LVS					44th	61	
2019	Kyle Busch Motorsports	51	Toyota																				TAL; 3	MAR	PHO	HOM	44th	61	
2020	Kyle Busch Motorsports	51	Toyota	**DAY**; 12	LVS	CLT	ATL	HOM	POC	KEN	TEX	KAN	KAN	MCH	DRC	DOV	GTW	DAR	RCH	BRI	LVS	TAL	KAN	TEX	MAR	PHO	86th	0^{1}	
2021	David Gilliland Racing	17	Ford	DAY	DRC; 5	LVS	ATL	BRD	RCH	KAN	DAR	COA	CLT	TEX	NSH	POC	KNX	GLN	GTW	DAR	BRI	LVS	TAL	MAR	PHO		99th	0^{1}	
2022	David Gilliland Racing	17	Ford	DAY; 12	LVS	ATL	COA	MAR	BRD	DAR	KAN; 12	TEX	CLT	GTW	SON	KNX	NSH	MOH	POC	IRP	RCH	KAN	BRI	TAL	HOM	PHO	93rd	0^{1}	

^{*} Season still in progress
^{1} Ineligible for series points

==== Pinty's Series ====
NASCAR Pinty's Series results
Year	Team	No.	Make	1	2	3	4	5	6	7	8	9	10	11	12	13	NPSC	Pts	Ref
2019	DJK Racing	28	Dodge	MSP; 20	JUK	ACD	TOR	SAS	SAS	EIR	CTR	RIS	MSP	ASE	NHA	JUK	43rd	24	

=== ARCA Menards Series ===
(key) (Bold – Pole position awarded by qualifying time. Italics – Pole position earned by points standings or practice time. * – Most laps led.)

ARCA Menards Series results
Year	Team	No.	Make	1	2	3	4	5	6	7	8	9	10	11	12	13	14	15	16	17	18	19	20	AMSC	Pts	Ref
2017	Joe Gibbs Racing	81	Toyota	DAY; Wth																				5th	4555	
2017	Joe Gibbs Racing	18	Toyota		NSH; 7	SLM; 12	TAL; 8	TOL; 5	**ELK**; 3*	POC; 1*	MCH; 16	MAD; 3	IOW; 12	IRP; 13	POC; 2	WIN; 17	ISF; 16	ROA; 2	DSF; 16	SLM; 17	CHI; 13	KEN; 7	KAN; 9	5th	4555	
2018	Joe Gibbs Racing	18	Toyota	DAY; 10	NSH; 13	SLM; 6	TAL; 17	TOL; 19	CLT; 2	POC; 5	MCH; 2	MAD; 13	GTW; 5	CHI; 6	IOW; 17	ELK; 4	POC; 5	ISF; 9	BLN; 9	DSF; 3	SLM; 9	IRP; 8	KAN; 4	3rd	4595	
2019	Joe Gibbs Racing	18	Toyota	DAY; 10	FIF	SLM	TAL; 2	NSH	TOL	CLT; 19	POC; 2*	MCH; 12	MAD	GTW	CHI; 6	ELK	IOW	POC	ISF	DSF; 6	SLM	IRP	KAN; 16	16th	1485	
2020	Joe Gibbs Racing	18	Toyota	DAY; 7	PHO	TAL; 4	POC	IRP	KEN	IOW	KAN; 3	TOL	TOL	MCH; 1	DRC	GTW	L44	TOL	BRI	WIN	MEM	ISF	KAN	24th	167	
2021	David Gilliland Racing	17	Ford	DAY	PHO	TAL	KAN	TOL	CLT	MOH	POC	ELK	BLN	IOW	WIN	GLN; 6	MCH	ISF	MLW	DSF	BRI	SLM	KAN	79th	38	

==== K&N Pro Series East ====
NASCAR K&N Pro Series East results
Year	Team	No.	Make	1	2	3	4	5	6	7	8	9	10	11	12	13	14	NKNPSEC	Pts	Ref
2016	Bill McAnally Racing	19	Toyota	NSM; 9	MOB	GRE	BRI; 10	VIR	DOM	STA	COL	NHA	IOW	GLN	GRE	NJM		29th	105	
2016	Bill McAnally Racing	16	Toyota														DOV; 8	29th	105	
2017	Bill McAnally Racing	54	Toyota	NSM	GRE	BRI; Wth	SBO	SBO	MEM	BLN	TMP	NHA	IOW	GLN	LGY	NJM		47th	37	
2017	MDM Motorsports	41	Toyota														DOV; 7	47th	37	
2018	DGR-Crosley	98	Toyota	NSM	BRI	LGY	SBO	SBO	MEM	NJM	THO	NHA	IOW	GLN	GTW	NHA; 4	DOV	40th	41	
2019	DGR-Crosley	17	Toyota	NSM	BRI; 18	SBO	SBO	MEM	NHA; 6	IOW								22nd	96	
2019	DGR-Crosley	54	Toyota								GLN; 12	BRI	GTW	NHA	DOV			22nd	96	

==== ARCA Menards Series West ====
ARCA Menards Series West results
Year	Team	No.	Make	1	2	3	4	5	6	7	8	9	10	11	12	13	14	AMSWC	Pts	Ref
2016	Bill McAnally Racing	19	Toyota	IRW; 6	KCR; 4	TUS; 7	OSS; 16	CNS; 13	SON; 5	SLS; 7	IOW; 3	EVG; 3	DCS; 3	MMP; 5	MMP; 4	MER; 19	AAS; 12	7th	510	
2017	Bill McAnally Racing	54	Toyota	TUS; 9	KCR	IRW	IRW	SPO	OSS	CNS	SON	IOW	EVG	DCS	MER	AAS	KCR; 3	28th	76	
2019	Levin Racing with Joe Gibbs Racing	10	Toyota	LVS	IRW	TUS	TUS	CNS	SON	DCS	IOW	EVG	GTW	MER	AAS	KCR	PHO; 10	48th	35	
2023	Jerry Pitts Racing	5	Ford	PHO	IRW	KCR	PIR; 18	SON; 3	IRW	SHA	EVG	AAS	LVS	MAD	PHO			27th	68	

=== CARS Late Model Stock Car Tour ===
(key) (Bold – Pole position awarded by qualifying time. Italics – Pole position earned by points standings or practice time. * – Most laps led. ** – All laps led.)

CARS Late Model Stock Car Tour results
Year	Team	No.	Make	1	2	3	4	5	6	7	8	9	10	11	12	CLMSCTC	Pts	Ref
2018	Glen Moffitt	5H	Chevy	TCM	MYB	ROU	HCY	BRI	ACE	CCS	KPT	HCY; 21	WKS	ROU	SBO	73rd	12	
2019	Nelson Motorsports	18	Toyota	SNM; 5	HCY	ROU	ACE	MMS	LGY	DOM	CCS	HCY	ROU	SBO		40th	28	

=== CARS Super Late Model Tour ===
(key)

CARS Super Late Model Tour results
Year	Team	No.	Make	1	2	3	4	5	6	7	8	9	10	CSLMTC	Pts	Ref
2015	LFR Development Group	19	N/A	SNM	ROU	HCY	SNM	TCM	MMS	ROU	CON	MYB	HCY; 11	47th	22	
2016	Fury Race Cars	19	N/A	SNM	ROU	HCY	TCM	GRE	ROU	CON	MYB	HCY; 2	SNM	40th	31	
