= Zane Smith =

American racing driver (born 1999)

- Smith at Las Vegas Motor Speedway in 2026
- Born: Zane Michael Smith; June 9, 1999 (age 27); Huntington Beach, California, U.S.
- Height: 6 ft 2 in (1.88 m)
- Achievements: 2022 NASCAR Camping World Truck Series Champion; 2022 NASCAR Camping World Truck Series Regular Season Champion; 2015 World Series of Asphalt Super Late Model Champion
- Awards: 2020 NASCAR Gander RV & Outdoors Truck Series Most Popular Driver; 2020 NASCAR Gander RV & Outdoors Truck Series Rookie of the Year; 2018 ARCA Racing Series Rookie of the Year; 2015 CARS Super Late Model Tour Rookie of the Year; 2015 PASS South Super Late Model Series Rookie of the Year

NASCAR Cup Series career
- 117 races run over 5 years
- Car no., team: No. 38 (Front Row Motorsports)
- 2026 position: 27th
- Best finish: 27th (2026)
- First race: 2022 Enjoy Illinois 300 (Gateway)
- Last race: 2026 Season Finale 400 (Homestead)
Wins	Top tens	Poles
0	16	1

NASCAR O'Reilly Auto Parts Series career
- 12 races run over 3 years
- 2023 position: 84th
- Best finish: 25th (2019)
- First race: 2019 Boyd Gaming 300 (Las Vegas)
- Last race: 2023 Tennessee Lottery 250 (Nashville)
Wins	Top tens	Poles
0	8	0

NASCAR FedEx Freight Truck Series career
- 97 races run over 6 years
- 2024 position: 81st
- Best finish: 1st (2022)
- First race: 2018 Eaton 200 (Gateway)
- Last race: 2024 CRC Brakleen 175 (Pocono)
- First win: 2020 Henry Ford Health System 200 (Michigan)
- Last win: 2023 XPEL 225 (COTA)
Wins	Top tens	Poles
9	61	3

ARCA Menards Series career
- 38 races run over 5 years
- Best finish: 2nd (2018)
- First race: 2016 Eddie Gilstrap Motors Fall Classic (Salem)
- Last race: 2021 General Tire 150 (Phoenix)
- First win: 2018 Music City 200 (Fairgrounds)
- Last win: 2018 ModSpace 150 (Pocono)
Wins	Top tens	Poles
4	26	3

ARCA Menards Series East career
- 2 races run over 1 year
- Best finish: 25th (2017)
- First race: 2017 Jet Tools 150 (New Smyrna)
- Last race: 2017 Zombie Auto 125 (Bristol)
Wins	Top tens	Poles
0	2	0

ARCA Menards Series West career
- 5 races run over 4 years
- Best finish: 33rd (2020)
- First race: 2017 NAPA Auto Parts Tucson 150 (Tucson)
- Last race: 2021 General Tire 200 (Sonoma)
Wins	Top tens	Poles
0	1	0
- Statistics up to date as of November 8, 2026.

Zane Michael Smith (born June 9, 1999) is an American professional stock car racing driver. He competes full-time in the NASCAR Cup Series, driving the No. 38 Ford Mustang Dark Horse SC for Front Row Motorsports. He is the 2022 NASCAR Camping World Truck Series champion, a title he earned while driving for FRM.

Smith previously competed full-time in the Craftsman Truck Series for GMS Racing, finishing as the championship runner-up in both 2020 and 2021. Earlier in his career, he also finished second in the 2018 ARCA Racing Series standings while driving for MDM Motorsports. Additionally, he has made part-time appearances in the NASCAR Xfinity Series with JR Motorsports and in Stadium Super Trucks.

== Racing career ==
=== Early career ===
Starting with Racing Snails, Smith transitioned to Go-Karting in 2004, where he dominated by winning championships for five consecutive years. He then advanced to legends car racing before moving up to super late models in 2015. That year, he achieved victories in the World Series of Asphalt, the Pro All Stars Series, and the CARS Tour, in addition to securing a runner-up finish in the prestigious Snowball Derby.

=== 2016 ===
Building on his success in late model racing, Smith tested an ARCA Menards Series car with Mason Mitchell Motorsports at Daytona International Speedway in January 2016. However, a Wakeskating injury sidelined him early that year. He eventually returned to compete in two ARCA races with Venturini Motorsports. By late summer 2016, Smith parted ways with his SLM team, aiming to gain more ARCA experience in 2017.

=== 2017 ===
In late 2016, Smith signed with Venturini Motorsports to drive all but two races of the 2017 ARCA Racing Series schedule in the No. 55 entry. Noah Gragson filled the other two races, as Smith was ineligible to compete due to age restrictions. Competing for Rookie of the Year honors, Smith joined the same crew that had guided Dalton Sargeant to the award the previous year. Smith also competed in a partial K&N Pro Series East schedule, debuting with Calabrese Motorsports early in 2017. Additionally, he stepped in for Ryan Partridge at the K&N Pro Series West season opener after Partridge was unable to obtain a license in time. In April 2017, Smith was named to the NASCAR Next class, a program highlighting up-and-coming talent. In August, Smith and Venturini parted ways after a strong run that included eight top-ten finishes in eleven races. Later in the season, Smith joined MDM Motorsports for three races, achieving two poles and two runner-up finishes.

=== 2018 ===
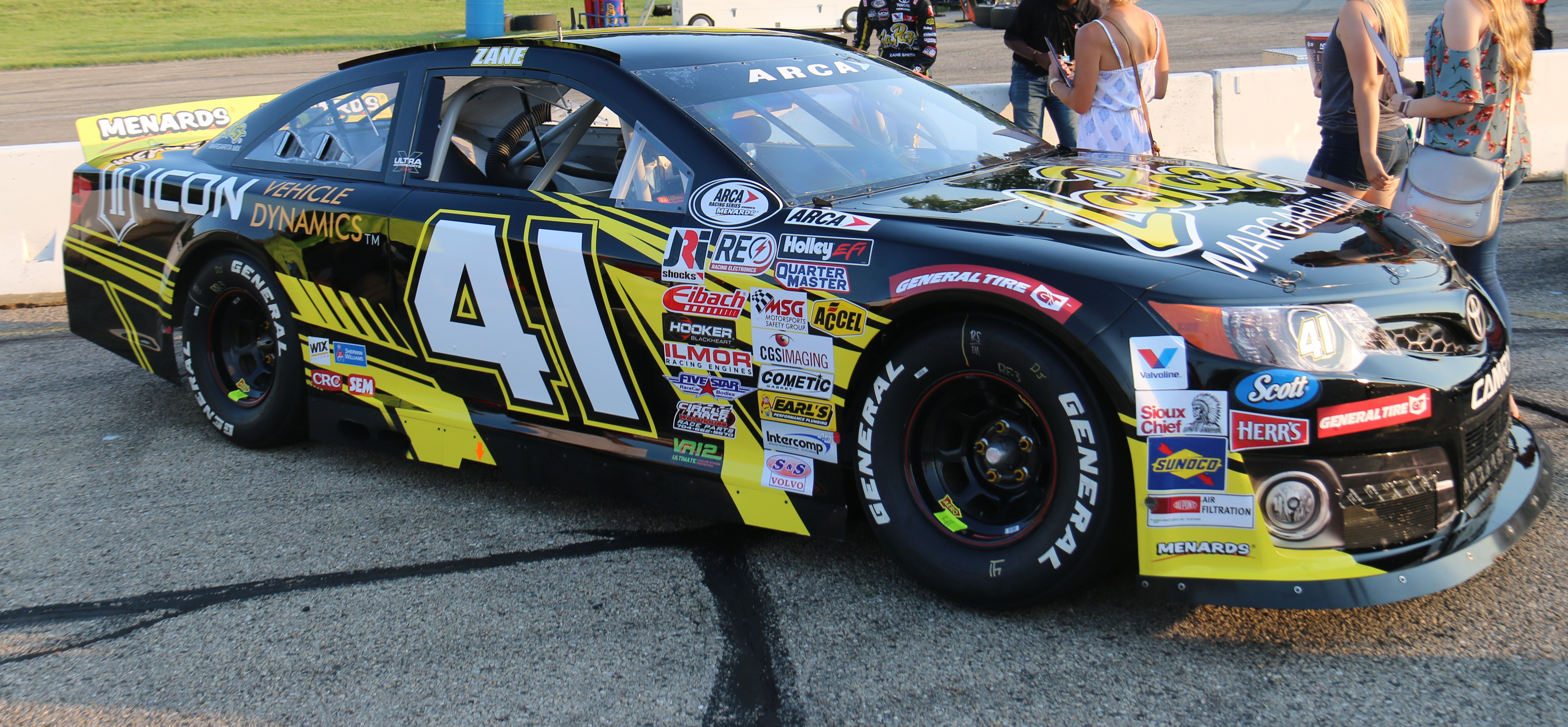
Smith's 2018 ARCA car

On November 6, 2017, Smith re-signed with MDM Motorsports for the 2018 season to compete full-time in their No. 41 Toyota. He claimed his first victory in the second race of the season, outlasting teammate Sheldon Creed and overcoming three previous runner-up finishes. Two races later, Smith secured a historic win at Talladega Superspeedway in ARCA’s closest-ever finish. The margin of victory was so tight—recorded as 0.00 seconds—that officials relied on photo evidence to determine the winner. In the next event, Smith made a bold three-wide pass involving Chandler Smith (no relation) and lapped car Mike Basham to take the lead. He later overtook teammate Chase Purdy with fewer than ten laps remaining to secure another victory, with assistance from 2017 ARCA champion Austin Theriault, who served as his spotter at Toledo Speedway. In May 2018, Smith was also named to the NASCAR Next program for the second consecutive year. Later in the season at Salem Speedway, Smith clashed repeatedly with Michael Self, causing his radiator to fail mid-race. After returning to the track, Smith deliberately slowed to wait for Self, then rammed him into the outside wall. In a subsequent MAVTV interview, Smith openly bragged about the incident. As a result, ARCA fined him US$5,000 and docked 100 points, though many within the industry criticized the penalty as too lenient. NASCAR Xfinity Series driver Scott Heckert expressed concerns about the safety implications of intentional wrecks. Despite the penalty, Smith finished second in the season standings. Reflecting on the season, he revealed that his full-time campaign was not initially planned but became possible as his performance helped secure sponsorships for the remainder of the schedule.

In June 2018, Smith made his NASCAR Camping World Truck Series debut with DGR-Crosley, driving the No. 54 truck at Gateway Motorsports Park. The deal came together just days before the race, requiring Smith to quickly secure his licenses. Despite the last-minute preparations, he qualified tenth and finished an impressive fifth.

=== 2019 ===
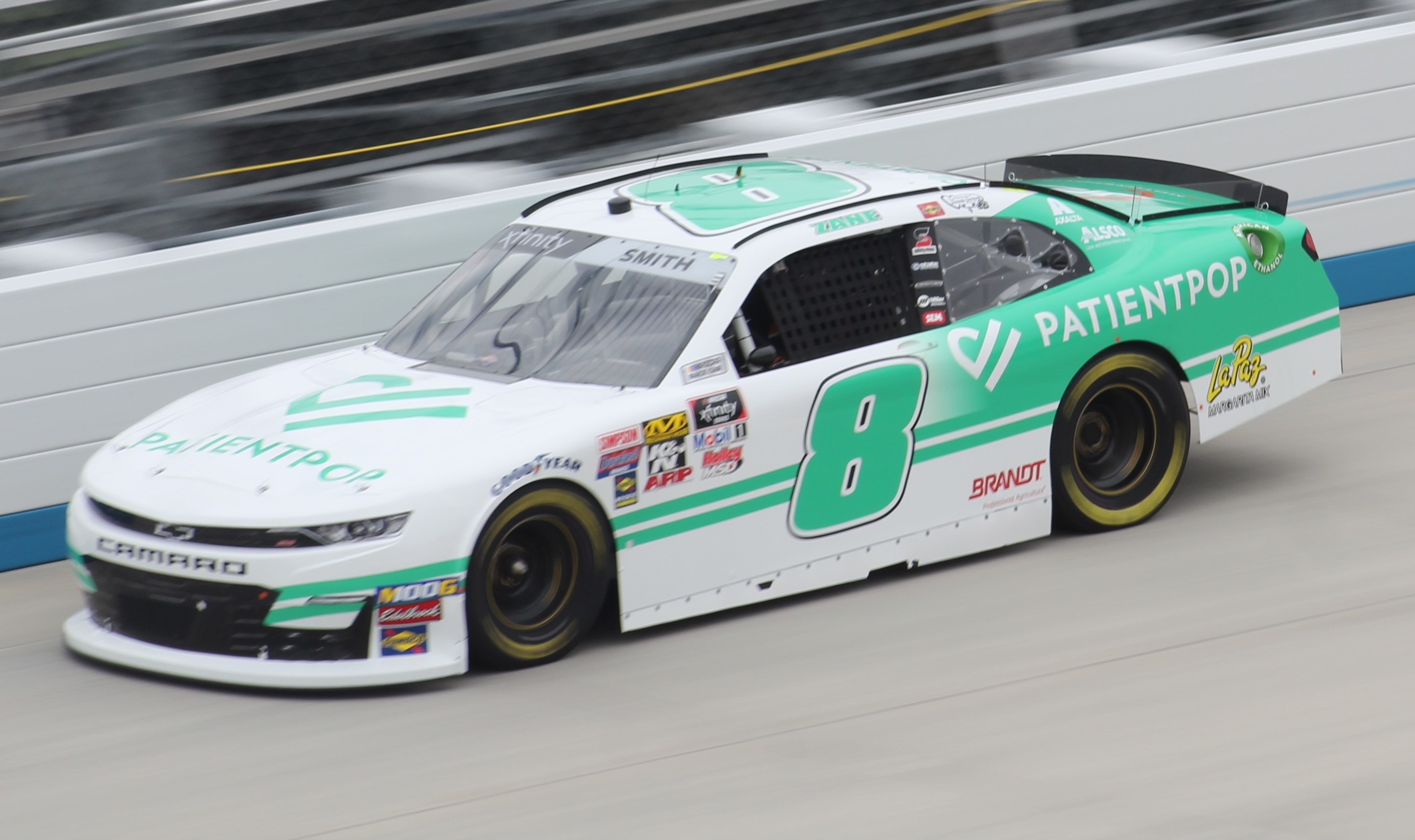
Smith's 2019 Xfinity car

On December 18, 2018, JR Motorsports announced that Smith would drive the No. 9 entry in the Xfinity Series for eight races during the 2019 season, primarily at short tracks. This opportunity arose after a full-time Truck Series deal with GMS Racing fell through. However, on January 25, 2019, it was confirmed that Smith would instead switch to the No. 8 car, as Noah Gragson took over the No. 9 entry.

=== 2020 ===
Smith joined GMS Racing for the full 2020 NASCAR Gander RV & Outdoors Truck Series season. On August 7, he earned his first career Truck Series victory at the Henry Ford Health System 200, overtaking Christian Eckes on the final lap in overtime. Two weeks later, he secured his second win at the KDI Office Technology 200, holding off Matt Crafton and Brett Moffitt on the final restart. Smith advanced to the championship round as the only non-playoff race winner among the final four drivers. He finished runner-up to GMS teammate Sheldon Creed in both the season finale at the Lucas Oil 150 and the overall standings. In recognition of his impressive season, Smith received NASCAR Rookie of the Year honors and was voted the Truck Series' Most Popular Driver.

=== 2021 ===
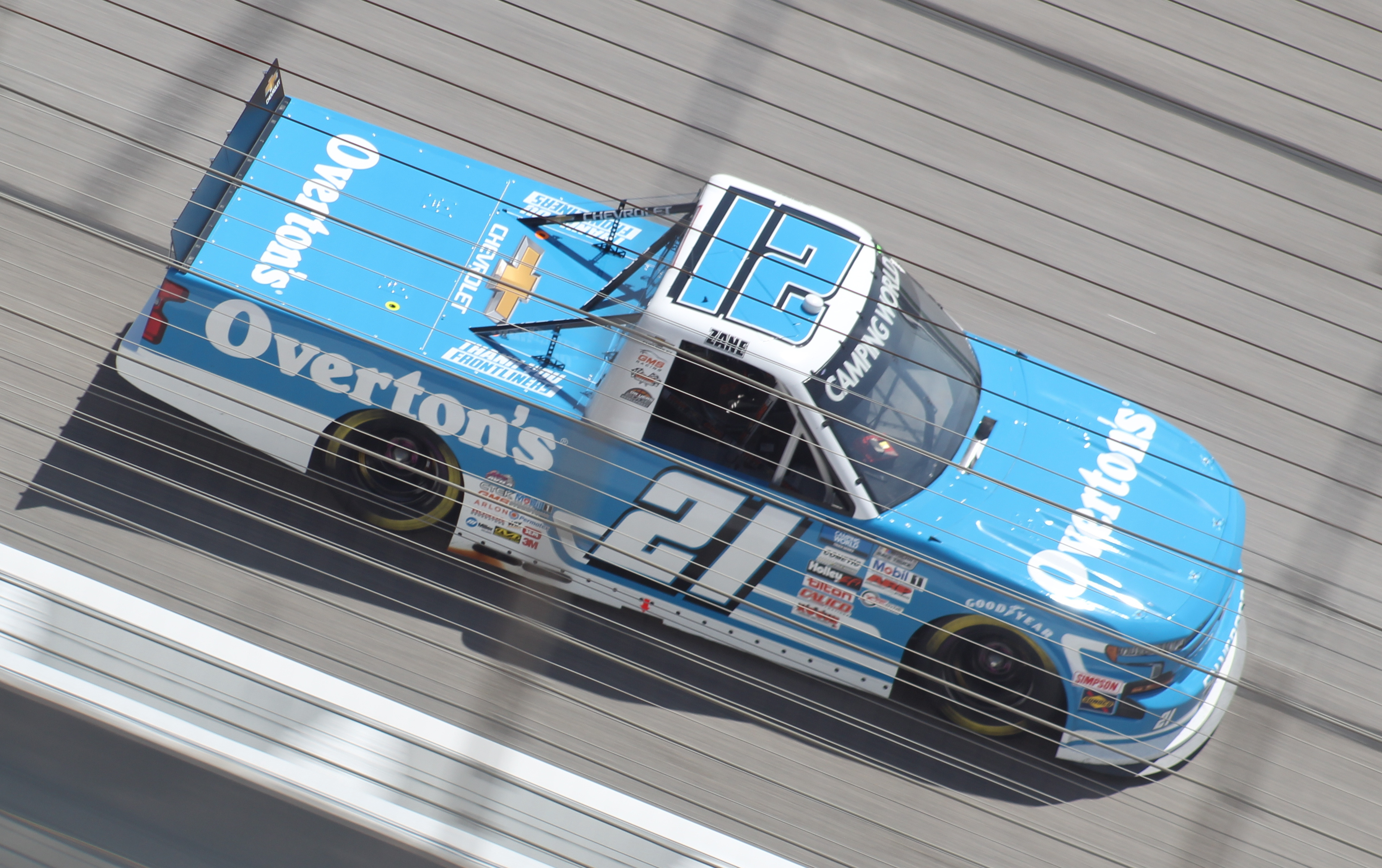
Zane Smith's 2021 truck

Smith returned to GMS Racing for the 2021 NASCAR Camping World Truck Series season. On October 30, he secured his third career Truck Series victory at the United Rentals 200 after Stewart Friesen spun Todd Gilliland in front of the field. The win clinched Smith's spot in the Championship 4 race at Phoenix. In the season finale, the Lucas Oil 150, Smith was passed with eight laps remaining and finished fifth in the race, ultimately placing second in the championship standings behind Ben Rhodes.

In May 2021, Smith made a one-off return to the NASCAR Xfinity Series as a substitute driver for Justin Haley, who was sidelined due to COVID-19 protocols. Smith drove the No. 11 car for Kaulig Racing at the Drydene 200.

=== 2022 ===
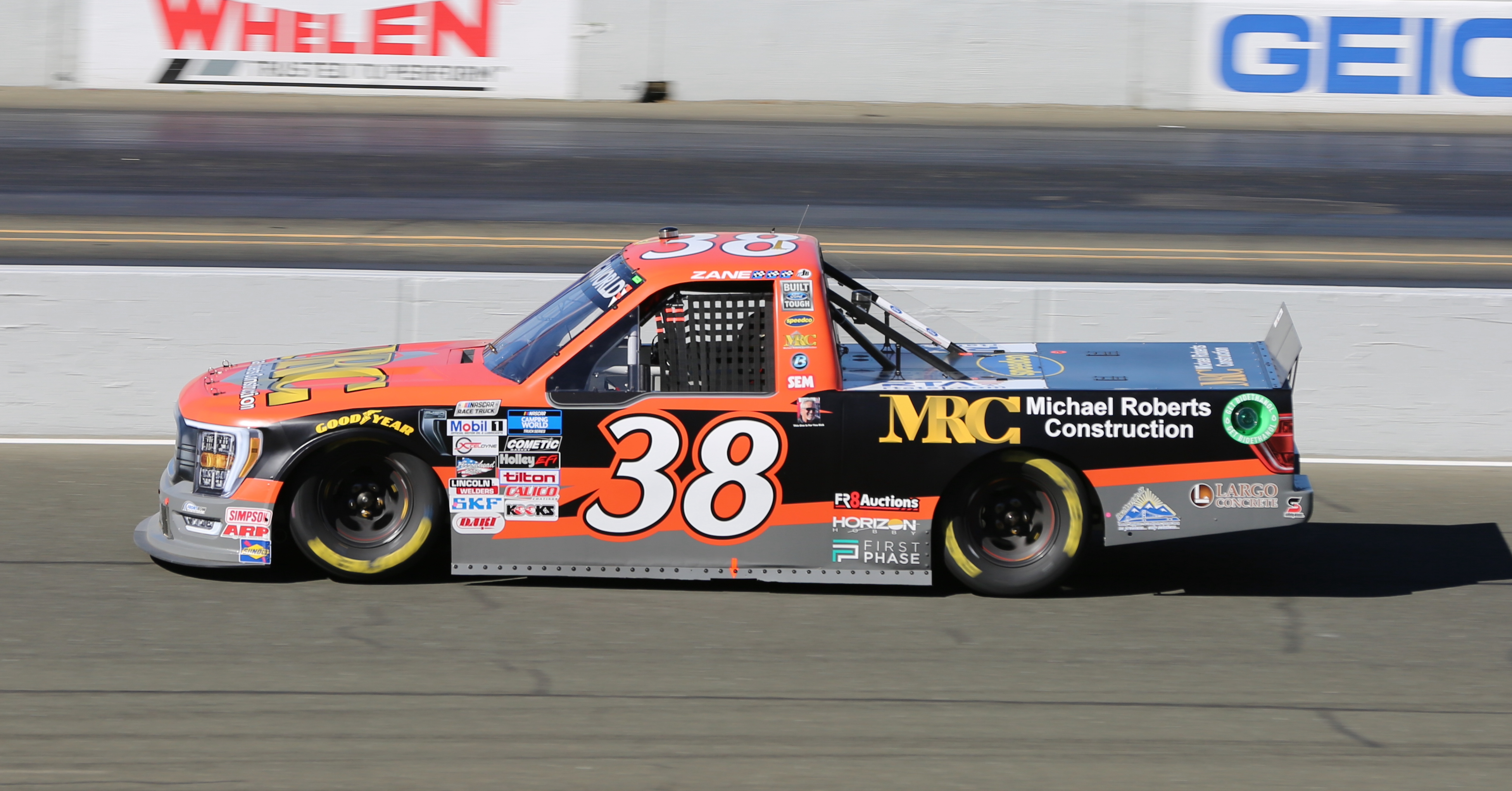
Smith's No. 38 truck at Sonoma Raceway in 2022

On November 30, 2021, Smith was announced as the driver of the No. 38 truck for Front Row Motorsports in the 2022 NASCAR Truck Series season. Smith began the season with a victory at Daytona, securing his fourth career Truck Series win after holding off Ben Rhodes in overtime. At Las Vegas, he initially finished second, but a post-race inspection revealed a lug nut violation, resulting in his disqualification. Smith rebounded with a fifth-place finish at Atlanta and earned his second win of the season at Circuit of the Americas, where he dominated by winning both stages. The victory came after Alex Bowman collided with front-runners Stewart Friesen and Kyle Busch, allowing Smith to capitalize. After the CRC Brakleen 150 at Pocono Raceway, Smith clinched the regular-season championship. He capped off an impressive season by winning the championship race at Phoenix on November 4, securing his first NASCAR Truck Series title and delivering Front Row Motorsports its first-ever NASCAR championship.

On June 2, 2022, RFK Racing driver Chris Buescher tested positive for COVID-19, forcing him to miss the Cup Series race at Gateway. Smith was announced as his replacement, marking Smith's debut in the Cup Series. After starting 32nd, Smith finished seventeenth on the lead lap.

=== 2023 ===
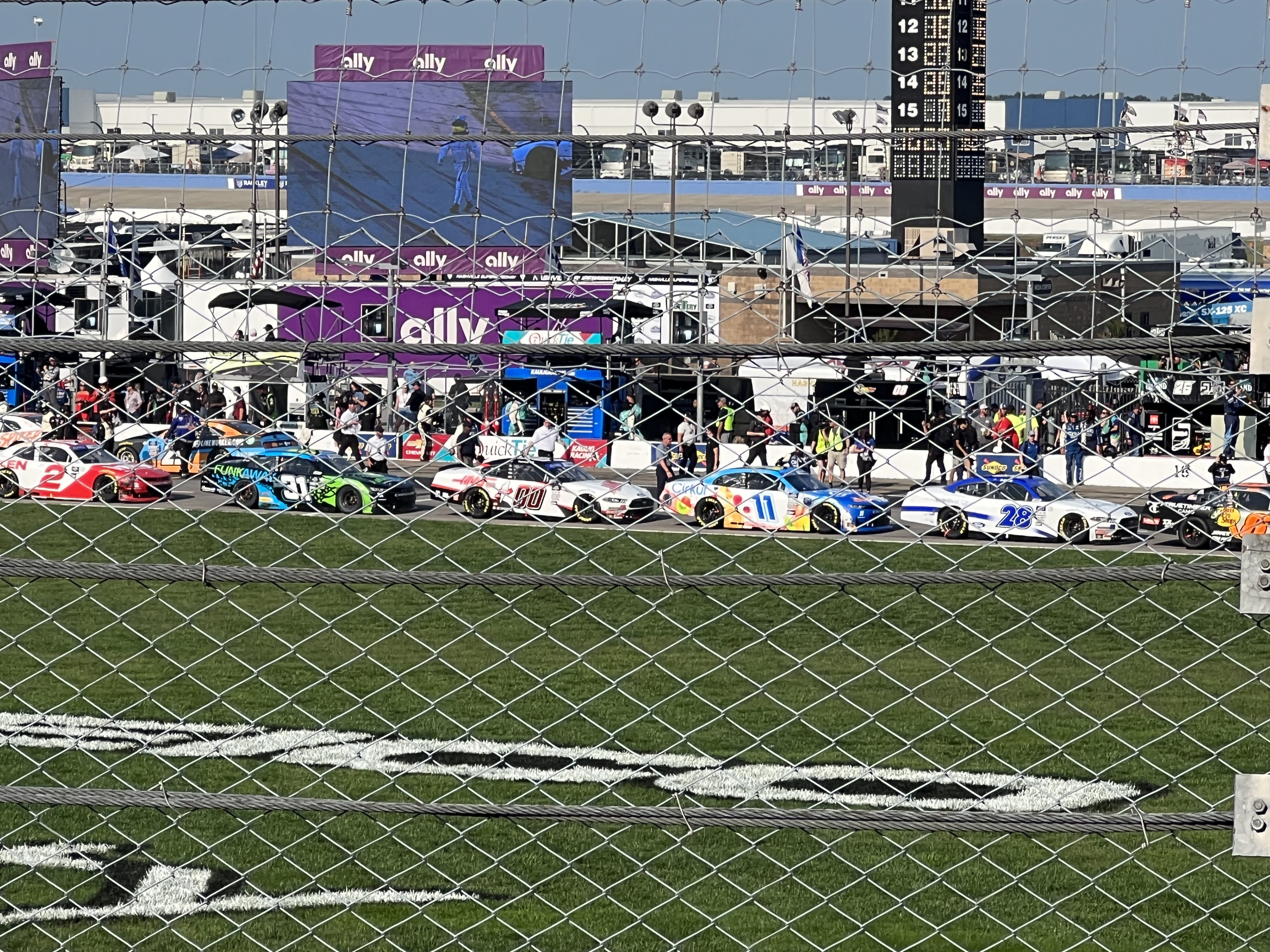
Smith, no. 28 car, among the cars that finished the race.

Smith began the 2023 season by winning at Daytona for the second consecutive year. He also secured a victory at the Circuit of the Americas and earned eight top-five finishes during the regular season. In the playoffs, Smith advanced to the Round of 8 but was eliminated after being disqualified at Homestead when post-race inspection revealed unapproved windshield supports.

In June 2023, Smith competed in the Xfinity Series at Nashville, driving the No. 28 car for RSS Racing as a replacement for Kyle Sieg, who drove the No. 29. Smith finished seventh in the race.

In the Cup Series, Smith drove the Front Row Motorsports No. 36 to a thirteenth place finish at the 2023 Daytona 500 and later piloted the Rick Ware Racing No. 51 at Martinsville.

=== 2024 ===
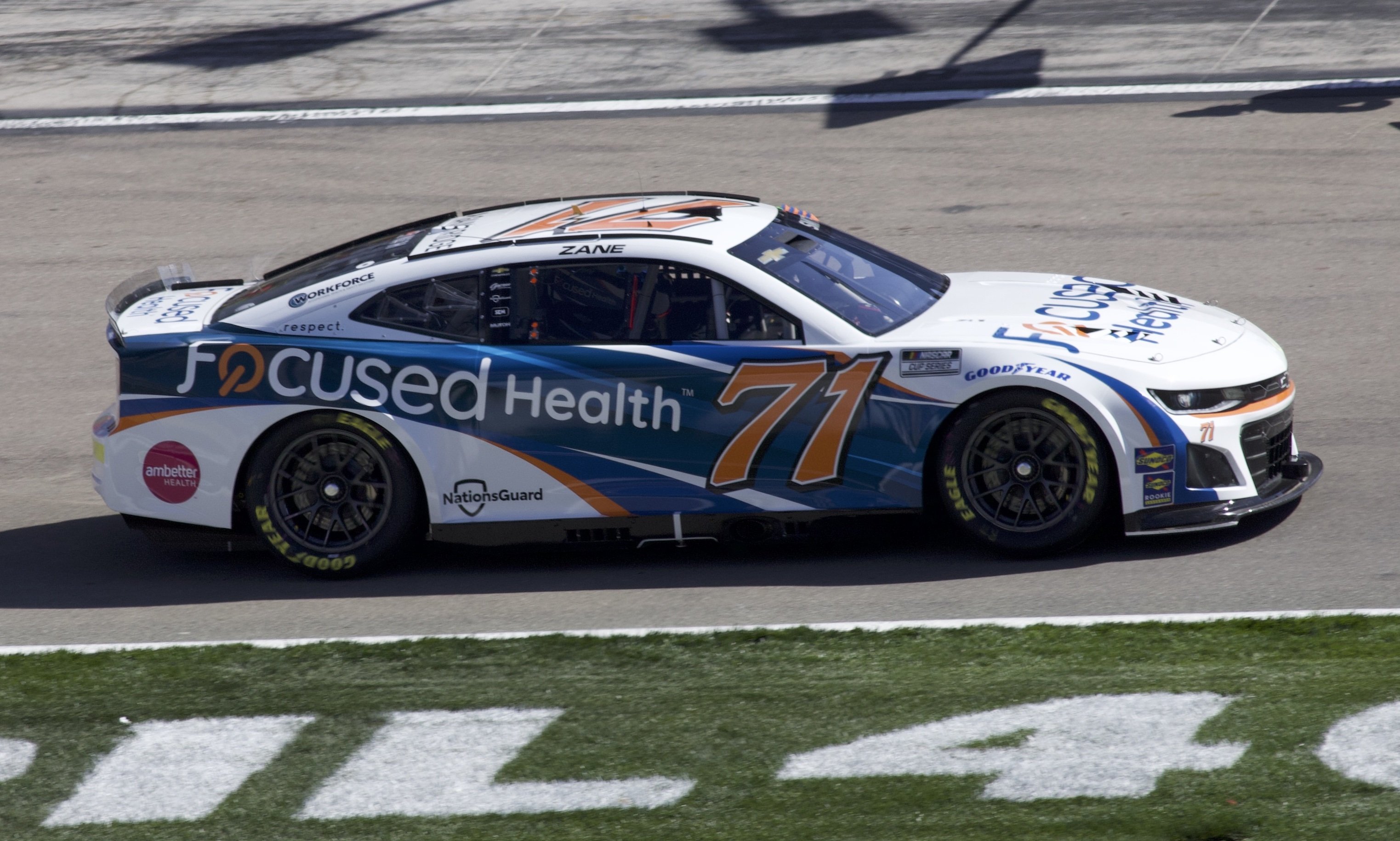
Smith's No. 71 car at Las Vegas Motor Speedway in 2024

On September 16, 2023, Smith signed a multi-year deal with Trackhouse Racing. As part of the agreement, Smith would drive Spire Motorsports' third team in 2024, with plans to join Trackhouse full-time in a third car in 2025. Smith’s 2024 season started with eighteen consecutive finishes outside the top-ten, averaging a disappointing 28.1. His best finish during that stretch was 13th at the Daytona 500. At Nashville, Smith was in contention for his first career victory in the closing laps but ultimately finished second to Joey Logano, marking his career-best Cup Series finish and his first-ever top-five. Despite showing some promise, Smith announced on August 23 that he would part ways with Trackhouse and Spire. This decision was reportedly due to his inconsistent performance and Trackhouse’s interest in promoting Shane van Gisbergen to the Cup Series. Smith concluded the 2024 season with two top-five finishes and four top-tens.

=== 2025 ===
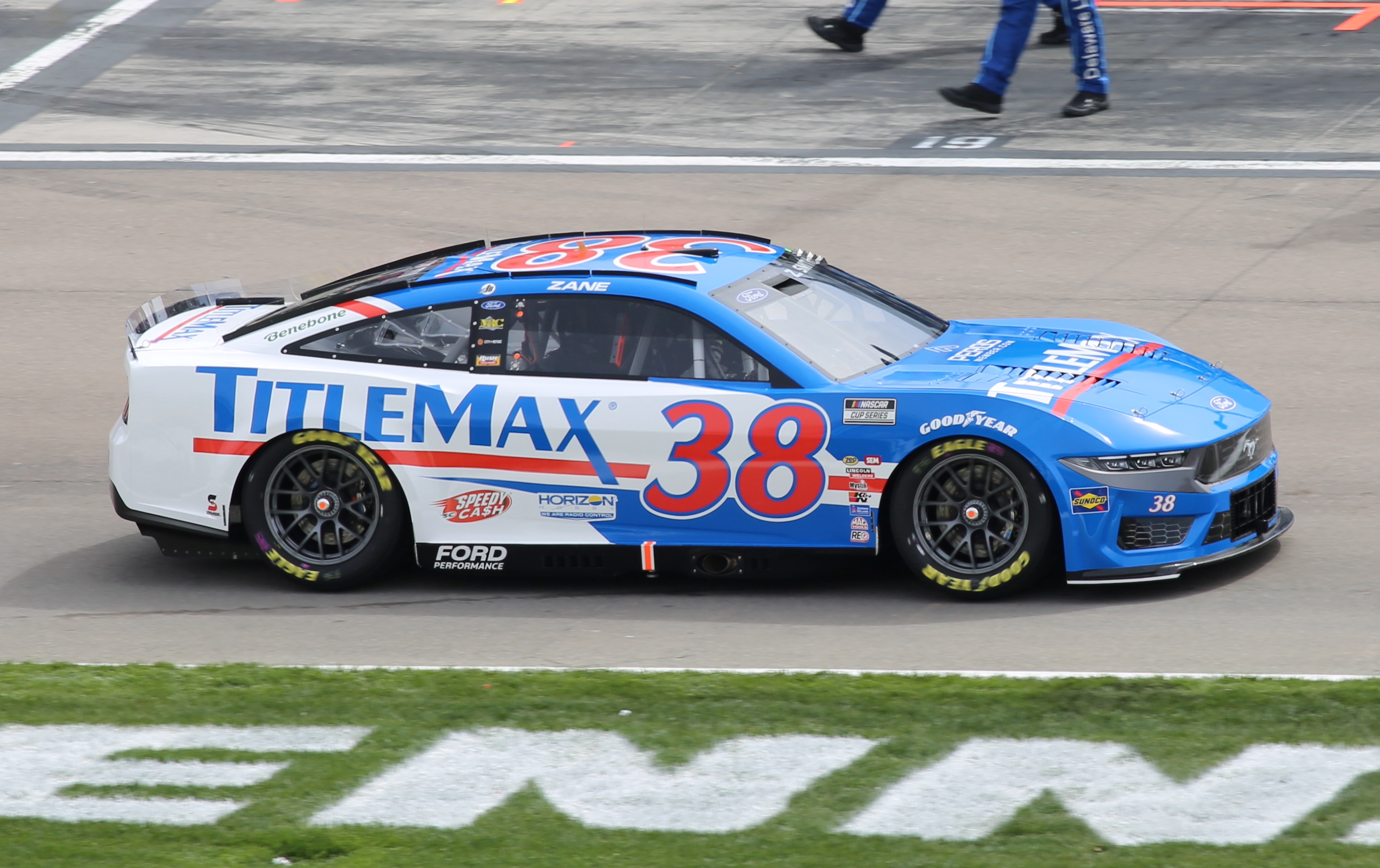
Smith's No. 38 car at Las Vegas Motor Speedway in 2025

On January 2, 2025, Front Row Motorsports announced that Smith will return to the team as the driver of the No. 38 Ford Dark Horse Mustang for 2025. Smith began the season with a 36th-place DNF at the Daytona 500. Smith would earn his first career Cup Series pole at Talladega in the spring and scored 3 top 10 finishes, but missed the playoffs after finishing 28th in regular season points. During the race at Kansas in the fall, Smith's car overturned in an incident with John Hunter Nemechek during an overtime attempt. Entering turn 3, Nemechek overdrove the corner and slid up from the middle lane, colliding with Smith, who was on his outside. Smith's car was squeezed into the outside wall, which lifted the passenger side off the ground as the car grinded along the wall on its driver's side. The car slid with the floor in contact with the wall for several hundred yards before overturning fully and barrel rolling on the lower banking on the exit of turn 4 before landing upright. Smith exited under his own power uninjured.

=== Other racing ===
On August 8, 2020, Smith made his Stadium Super Trucks debut at Road America, just one day after winning the NASCAR Truck Series race at Michigan. The event also featured two-time SST champion Creed. Smith finished fifth in the first race and sixth in the second.

Smith and his teammate, Harrison Burton, secured victory at the 2023 IMSA Michelin Pilot Challenge event held at Daytona International Speedway.

== Personal life ==
Smith was born in Huntington Beach, California. He is the son of Mike Smith, who runs the professional off-road racing team, Herbst-Smith Fabrication. Trucks built by Hersbt-Smith have won the Baja 1000 over 10 times. Smith is married to McCall Gaulding, the younger sister of fellow race car driver Gray Gaulding.

== Motorsports career results ==
=== Stock car career summary ===
Season	Series	Team	Races	Wins	Top 5	Top 10	Points	Position
2015	CARS Super Late Model Tour	Garry Crooks	10	1	2	9	256	**3rd**
2016	CARS Super Late Model Tour	Garry Crooks	5	0	1	1	103	14th
2016	ARCA Racing Series	Venturini Motorsports	2	0	0	1	295	75th
2017	CARS Super Late Model Tour	Mike Smith	2	0	1	2	56	26th
2017	NASCAR K&N Pro Series West	Sunrise Ford Racing	1	0	1	1	40	40th
2017	NASCAR K&N Pro Series East	Calabrese Motorsports	2	0	1	2	77	25th
2017	ARCA Racing Series	Venturini Motorsports	11	0	4	8	3305	9th
2017	ARCA Racing Series	MDM Motorsports	3	0	3	3	3305	9th
2018	ARCA Racing Series	MDM Motorsports	20	4	12	13	4680	**2nd**
2018	NASCAR Camping World Truck Series	DGR-Crosley	1	0	1	1	32	59th
2019	NASCAR K&N Pro Series West	Steve McGowan Motorsports	1	0	0	0	23	62nd
2019	NASCAR Xfinity Series	JR Motorsports	10	0	2	7	322	25th
2020	Stadium Super Trucks	N/A	2	0	1	2	0	NC†
2020	ARCA Menards Series West	Steve McGowan Motorsports	1	0	0	0	68	33rd
2020	ARCA Menards Series	Steve McGowan Motorsports	1	0	1	1	40	51st
2020	NASCAR Gander Outdoors Truck Series	GMS Racing	23	2	7	13	4035	**2nd**
2021	CARS Super Late Model Tour	Wade Lopez	1	0	0	0	0	NC†
2021	ARCA Menards Series West	Steve McGowan Motorsports	2	0	0	0	39	45th
2021	ARCA Menards Series	Steve McGowan Motorsports	1	0	0	0	16	116th
2021	CARS Late Model Stock Car Tour	GMS Racing	1	0	0	0	4	67th
2021	NASCAR Camping World Truck Series	GMS Racing	23	1	3	14	4032	**2nd**
2021	NASCAR Xfinity Series	Kaulig Racing	1	0	0	0	0	NC†
2022	NASCAR Camping World Truck Series	Front Row Motorsports	23	4	14	19	4040	**1st**
2022	NASCAR Cup Series	RFK Racing	1	0	0	0	0	NC†
2023	NASCAR Craftsman Truck Series	Front Row Motorsports	23	2	10	10	2194	7th
2023	NASCAR Cup Series	Front Row Motorsports	7	0	0	1	0	NC†
2023	NASCAR Cup Series	Rick Ware Racing	1	0	0	0	0	NC†
2023	NASCAR Xfinity Series	RSS Racing	1	0	0	1	0	NC†
2024	NASCAR Craftsman Truck Series	McAnally–Hilgemann Racing	5	0	3	4	0	NC†
2024	NASCAR Cup Series	Spire Motorsports	36	0	2	4	505	30th
2025	NASCAR Cup Series	Front Row Motorsports	36	0	1	5	615	28th
2026	NASCAR Cup Series	Front Row Motorsports	36	0	2	6	584	27th

^{†} As Smith was a guest driver, he was ineligible for championship points.

=== NASCAR ===
(key) (Bold – Pole position awarded by qualifying time. Italics – Pole position earned by points standings or practice time. * – Most laps led.)

==== Cup Series ====
NASCAR Cup Series results
Year	Team	No.	Make	1	2	3	4	5	6	7	8	9	10	11	12	13	14	15	16	17	18	19	20	21	22	23	24	25	26	27	28	29	30	31	32	33	34	35	36	NCSC	Pts	Ref
2022	RFK Racing	17	Ford	DAY	CAL	LVS	PHO	ATL	COA	RCH	MAR	BRD	TAL	DOV	DAR	KAN	CLT	GTW; 17	SON	NSH	ROA	ATL	NHA	POC	IRC	MCH	RCH	GLN	DAY	DAR	KAN	BRI	TEX	TAL	ROV	LVS	HOM	MAR	PHO	49th	0^{1}	
2023	Front Row Motorsports	36	Ford	DAY; 13	CAL	LVS																																		46th	0^{1}	
2023	Front Row Motorsports	38	Ford				PHO; 31	ATL	COA	RCH	BRD		TAL; 37	DOV	KAN	DAR	CLT; 10	GTW	SON; 34	NSH	CSC	ATL	NHA	POC	RCH	MCH	IRC	GLN	DAY	DAR	KAN	BRI	TEX; 24	TAL	ROV; 30	LVS	HOM	MAR	PHO	46th	0^{1}	
2023	Rick Ware Racing	51	Ford									MAR; 34																												46th	0^{1}	
2024	Spire Motorsports	71	Chevy	DAY; 13	ATL; 35	LVS; 36	PHO; 29	BRI; 36	COA; 19	RCH; 35	MAR; 31	TEX; 26	TAL; 29	DOV; 24	KAN; 29	DAR; 35	CLT; 33	GTW; 19	SON; 16	IOW; 31	NHA; 30	NSH; 2	CSC; 17	POC; 29	IND; 17	RCH; 23	MCH; 7	DAY; 13	DAR; 23	ATL; 21	GLN; 5	BRI; 16	KAN; 10	TAL; 21	ROV; 19	LVS; 16	HOM; 30	MAR; 21	PHO; 39	30th	505	
2025	Front Row Motorsports	38	Ford	DAY; 36	ATL; 11	COA; 29	PHO; 9	LVS; 23	HOM; 11	MAR; 16	DAR; 12	BRI; 27	**TAL**; 19	TEX; 17	KAN; 16	CLT; 39	NSH; 13	MCH; 7	MXC; 35	POC; 25	ATL; 7	CSC; 14	SON; 27	DOV; 22	IND; 31	IOW; 36	GLN; 17	RCH; 11	DAY; 31	DAR; 13	GTW; 33	BRI; 3	NHA; 27	KAN; 31	ROV; 24	LVS; 24	TAL; 9	MAR; 25	PHO; 29	28th	615	
2026	Front Row Motorsports	38	Ford	DAY; 6	ATL; 7	COA; 33	PHO; 27	LVS; 14	DAR; 22	MAR; 34	BRI; 19	KAN; 32	TAL; 5	TEX; 22	GLN; 18	CLT; 10	NSH; 9	MCH; 33	POC; 37	COR; 4	SON; 18	CHI; 28	ATL; 30	NWS; 22	IND; 15	IOW; 16	RCH; 36	NHA; 13	DAY; 32	DAR; 25	GTW; 36	BRI; 28	KAN; 31	LVS; 36	CLT; 20	PHO; 15	TAL; 19	MAR; 19	HOM; 14	27th	584	

===== Daytona 500 =====
Year	Team	Manufacturer	Start	Finish
2023	Front Row Motorsports	Ford	17	13
2024	Spire Motorsports	Chevrolet	14	13
2025	Front Row Motorsports	Ford	37	36
2026	Front Row Motorsports	Ford	30	6

==== Xfinity Series ====
NASCAR Xfinity Series results
Year	Team	No.	Make	1	2	3	4	5	6	7	8	9	10	11	12	13	14	15	16	17	18	19	20	21	22	23	24	25	26	27	28	29	30	31	32	33	NXSC	Pts	Ref
2019	JR Motorsports	8	Chevy	DAY	ATL	LVS; 24	PHO	CAL	TEX	BRI; 11	RCH; 6	TAL	DOV; 9	CLT	POC	MCH	IOW; 5	CHI; 17	DAY	KEN	NHA	IOW; 9	GLN	MOH	BRI	ROA	DAR	IND	LVS	RCH; 8	ROV	DOV; 9	KAN	TEX	PHO; 5	HOM	25th	322	
2021	Kaulig Racing	11	Chevy	DAY	DRC	HOM	LVS	PHO	ATL	MAR	TAL	DAR	DOV; 36	COA	CLT	MOH	TEX	NSH	POC	ROA	ATL	NHA	GLN	IRC	MCH	DAY	DAR	RCH	BRI	LVS	TAL	ROV	TEX	KAN	MAR	PHO	103rd	0^{1}	
2023	RSS Racing	28	Ford	DAY	CAL	LVS	PHO	ATL	COA	RCH	MAR	TAL	DOV	DAR	CLT	PIR	SON	NSH; 7	CSC	ATL	NHA	POC	ROA	MCH	IRC	GLN	DAY	DAR	KAN	BRI	TEX	ROV	LVS	HOM	MAR	PHO	84th	0^{1}	

==== Craftsman Truck Series ====
NASCAR Craftsman Truck Series results
Year	Team	No.	Make	1	2	3	4	5	6	7	8	9	10	11	12	13	14	15	16	17	18	19	20	21	22	23	NCTC	Pts	Ref
2018	DGR-Crosley	54	Toyota	DAY	ATL	LVS	MAR	DOV	KAN	CLT	TEX	IOW	GTW; 5	CHI	KEN	ELD	POC	MCH	BRI	MSP	LVS	TAL	MAR	TEX	PHO	HOM	59th	32	
2020	GMS Racing	21	Chevy	DAY; 11	LVS; 6	CLT; 3	ATL; 5	HOM; 37	POC; 14	KEN; 7	TEX; 19	KAN; 6	KAN; 9*	MCH; 1	DRC; 13	DOV; 1*	GTW; 7	DAR; 16	RCH; 11	BRI; 16	LVS; 7	TAL; 33	KAN; 11	TEX; 3	MAR; 3	PHO; 2	2nd	4035	
2021	GMS Racing	21	Chevy	DAY; 16	DRC; 40	LVS; 6	ATL; 6	BRD; 7	RCH; 14	KAN; 7	DAR; 16	COA; 8	CLT; 10	TEX; 6	NSH; 4	POC; 8	KNX; 14	GLN; 6	GTW; 35	DAR; 9	BRI; 8	LVS; 29	TAL; 33	MAR; 1	PHO; 5		2nd	4032	
2022	Front Row Motorsports	38	Ford	DAY; 1	LVS; 36	ATL; 5	COA; 1	MAR; 9	BRD; 10	DAR; 8	KAN; 1*	TEX; 32	CLT; 5	GTW; 9	SON; 2	KNX; 3	NSH; 2	MOH; 2	POC; 13	IRP; 3	RCH; 9	KAN; 4	BRI; 2	TAL; 17	HOM; 2	**PHO**; 1*	1st	4040	
2023	Front Row Motorsports	38	Ford	DAY; 1	LVS; 2	ATL; 20	COA; 1*	TEX; 14	**BRD**; 21	**MAR**; 3	KAN; 3	DAR; 22	NWS; 32	CLT; 23	GTW; 20	NSH; 2	MOH; 2	POC; 34	RCH; 3	IRP; 5	MLW; 12	KAN; 5	BRI; 24	TAL; 32	HOM; 34	PHO; 25	7th	2194	
2024	McAnally–Hilgemann Racing	91	Chevy	DAY	ATL	LVS; 8	BRI; 3	COA	MAR	TEX; 5	KAN; 2	DAR	NWS	CLT	GTW	NSH	POC; 20	IRP	RCH	MLW	BRI	KAN	TAL	HOM	MAR	PHO	81st	0^{1}	

^{*} Season still in progress
^{1} Ineligible for series points

=== ARCA Menards Series ===
(key) (Bold – Pole position awarded by qualifying time. Italics – Pole position earned by points standings or practice time. * – Most laps led.)

ARCA Menards Series results
Year	Team	No.	Make	1	2	3	4	5	6	7	8	9	10	11	12	13	14	15	16	17	18	19	20	AMSC	Pts	Ref
2016	Venturini Motorsports	66	Toyota	DAY	NSH	SLM	TAL	TOL	NJE	POC	MCH	MAD	WIN	IOW	IRP	POC	BLN	ISF	DSF	SLM; 9	CHI			75th	295	
2016	Venturini Motorsports	15	Toyota																			KEN; 24	KAN	75th	295	
2017	Venturini Motorsports	20	Toyota	DAY; Wth			TAL; Wth																	9th	3305	
2017	Venturini Motorsports	55	Toyota		NSH; 10	SLM; 6		TOL; 4	ELK; 6	POC; 4	MCH; 23	MAD; 2	IOW; 13	IRP; 7	POC; 3	WIN; 15	ISF	ROA	DSF					9th	3305	
2017	MDM Motorsports	28	Toyota																	**SLM**; 2	CHI			9th	3305	
2017	MDM Motorsports	8	Toyota																			KEN; 2		9th	3305	
2017	MDM Motorsports	41	Toyota																				**KAN**; 3	9th	3305	
2018	MDM Motorsports	41	Toyota	DAY; 26	NSH; 1*	SLM; 2	TAL; 1	TOL; 1	CLT; 5	POC; 3	MCH; 11	MAD; 2	GTW; 16	CHI; 4	IOW; 4	ELK; 12	POC; 1*	ISF; 17	BLN; 2	DSF; 5	**SLM**; 18	IRP; 6	KAN; 17	2nd	4680	
2020	Steve McGowan Motorsports	17W	Chevy	DAY	PHO; 5	TAL	POC	IRP	KEN	IOW	KAN	TOL	TOL	MCH	DAY	GTW	I44	TOL	BRI	WIN	MEM	ISF	KAN	51st	40	
2021	Steve McGowan Motorsports	17W	Chevy	DAY	PHO; 28	TAL	KAN	TOL	CLT	MOH	POC	ELK	BLN	IOW	WIN	GLN	MCH	ISF	MLW	DSF	BRI	SLM	KAN	116th	16	

==== K&N Pro Series East ====
NASCAR K&N Pro Series East results
Year	Team	No.	Make	1	2	3	4	5	6	7	8	9	10	11	12	13	14	NKNPSEC	Pts	Ref
2017	Calabrese Motorsports	43	Toyota	NSM; 2	GRE	BRI; 9	SBO	SBO	MEM	BLN	TMP	NHA	IOW	GLN	LGY	NJE	DOV	25th	77	

==== ARCA Menards Series West ====
ARCA Menards Series West results
Year	Team	No.	Make	1	2	3	4	5	6	7	8	9	10	11	12	13	14	AMSWC	Pts	Ref
2017	Sunrise Ford Racing	9	Ford	TUS; 4	KCR	IRW	IRW	SPO	OSS	CNS	SON	IOW	EVG	DCS	MER	AAS	KCR	40th	40	
2019	Steve McGowan Motorsports	17	Chevy	LVS	IRW	TUS	TUS	CNS	SON	DCS	IOW	EVG	GTW	MER	AAS	KCR	PHO; 21	62nd	23	
2020	Steve McGowan Motorsports	17W	Chevy	LVS	MMP	MMP	IRW	EVG	DCS	CNS	LVS	AAS	KCR	PHO; 26				33rd	68	
2021	Steve McGowan Motorsports	17W	Chevy	PHO; 28	SON; 21	IRW	CNS	IRW	PIR	LVS	AAS	PHO						45th	39	

=== Stadium Super Trucks ===
(key) (Bold – Pole position. Italics – Fastest qualifier. * – Most laps led.)

Stadium Super Trucks results
Year	1	2	3	4	5	SSTC	Pts	Ref
2020	ADE	ADE	ADE	ROA; 5	ROA; 6	N/A^{2}	–	

^{2} Standings were not recorded by the series for the 2020 season

=== CARS Late Model Stock Car Tour ===
(key) (Bold – Pole position awarded by qualifying time. Italics – Pole position earned by points standings or practice time. * – Most laps led. ** – All laps led.)

CARS Late Model Stock Car Tour results
Year	Team	No.	Make	1	2	3	4	5	6	7	8	9	10	11	12	13	CLMSCTC	Pts	Ref
2021	GMS Racing	21	Chevy	DIL	HCY	OCS	ACE	CRW	LGY	DOM	HCY; 29	MMS	TCM	FLC	WKS	SBO	67th	4	

=== CARS Super Late Model Tour ===
(key)

CARS Super Late Model Tour results
Year	Team	No.	Make	1	2	3	4	5	6	7	8	9	10	11	12	13	CSLMTC	Pts	Ref
2015	Garry Crooks	77	Chevy	SNM; 28	ROU; 9	HCY; 8	SNM; 7	TCM; 7	MMS; 1	ROU; 7	CON; 8	MYB; 6	HCY; 5				3rd	256	
2016	Garry Crooks	77	Chevy	SNM; 19	ROU; 11	HCY	TCM	GRE; 4	ROU	CON; 13	MYB						14th	103	
2016	Garry Crooks	77S	Chevy									HCY; 16	SNM				14th	103	
2017	Mike Smith	77S	Toyota	CON; 8	DOM	DOM	HCY	HCY	BRI	AND	ROU	TCM	ROU	HCY	CON		26th	56	
2017	Mike Smith	77	Toyota													SBO; 3	26th	56	
2021	Wade Lopez	96	Chevy	HCY	GPS; 19	NSH	JEN	HCY	MMS	TCM	SBO						N/A	0	
