= 2025 Hollywood Casino 400 =

NASCAR Cup Series race

Race details
- Race 31 of 36 in the 2025 NASCAR Cup Series
- Date: September 28, 2025
- Location: Kansas Speedway in Kansas City, Kansas, U.S.
- Course: Permanent racing facility
- Course length: 1.5 miles (2.4 km)
- Distance: 273 laps, 409.5 mi (655.2 km)
- Scheduled distance: 267 laps, 400.5 mi (640.8 km)
- Weather: Sunny with a temperature around 86 °F (30 °C); wind out of the north at 3 miles per hour (4.8 km/h).
- Average speed: 123.106 miles per hour (198.120 km/h)

Pole position
Driver	Chase Briscoe	Joe Gibbs Racing
- Time: 29.987

Most laps led
Driver	Denny Hamlin	Joe Gibbs Racing
- Laps: 159

Fastest lap
Driver	Denny Hamlin	Joe Gibbs Racing
- Time: 30.278

Winner
No. 9	Chase Elliott	Hendrick Motorsports

Television in the United States
- Network: USA
- Announcers: Leigh Diffey, Jeff Burton, and Steve Letarte.
- Nielsen ratings: 0.79 (1.490 million)

Radio in the United States
- Radio: MRN
- Booth announcers: Alex Hayden, Mike Bagley and Todd Gordon
- Turn announcers: Dave Moody (1 & 2) and Kurt Becker (3 & 4)

The 2025 Hollywood Casino 400 was a NASCAR Cup Series race that was held on September 28, 2025, at Kansas Speedway in Kansas City, Kansas. Contested over 273 laps, extended from 267 laps due to an overtime finish, on the 1.5 mi (2.4 km) intermediate speedway, it was the 31st race of the 2025 NASCAR Cup Series season, the fifth race of the Playoffs, and the second race of the Round of 12.

Chase Elliott won the race. Denny Hamlin finished 2nd, and Christopher Bell finished 3rd. Chase Briscoe and Bubba Wallace rounded out the top five, and Kyle Larson, Tyler Reddick, Brad Keselowski, William Byron, and Shane van Gisbergen rounded out the top ten.

== Report ==
=== Background ===
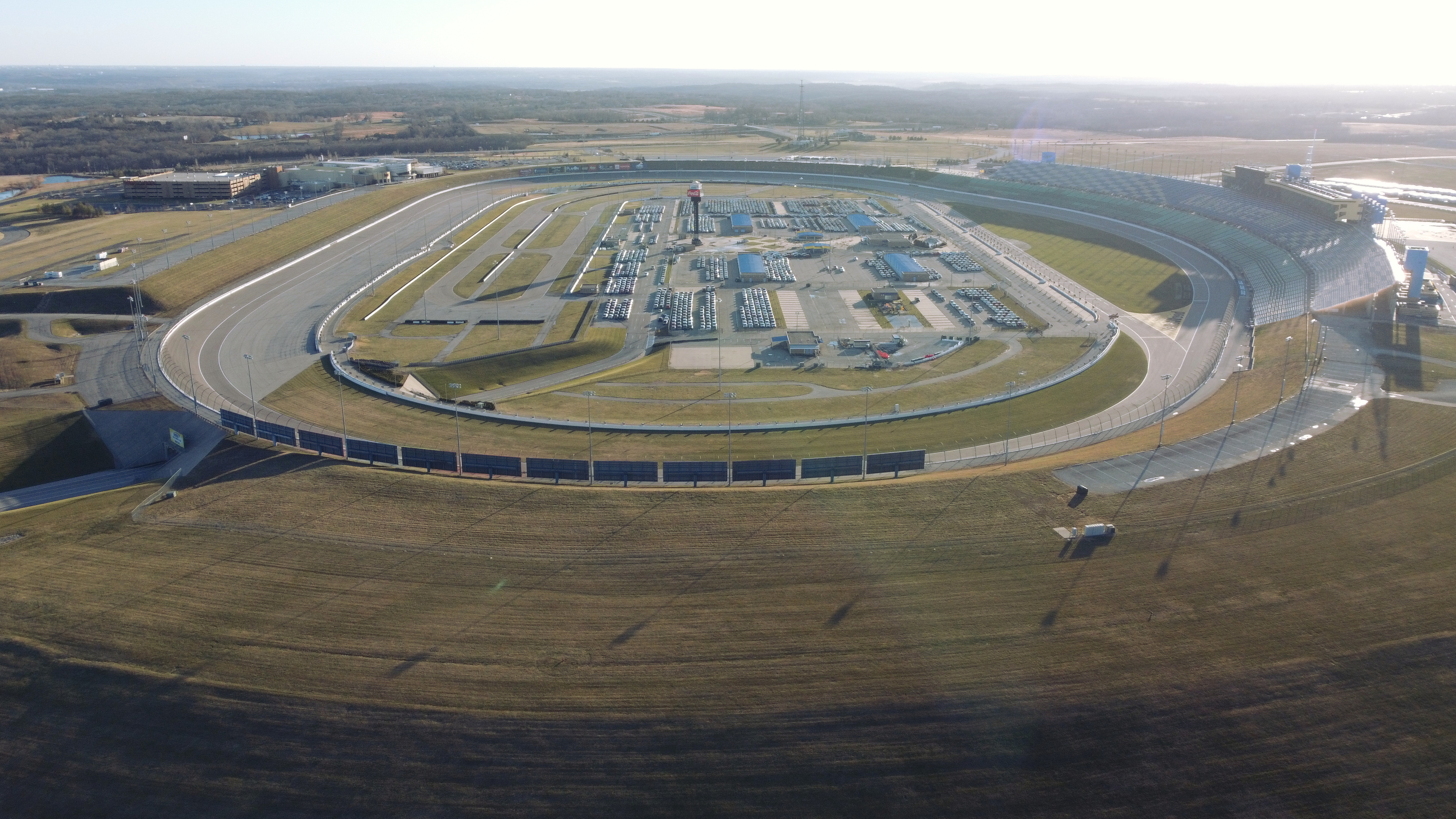
The layout of Kansas Speedway, the venue where the race was held.

Kansas Speedway is a 1.5-mile (2.4 km) tri-oval race track in Kansas City, Kansas. It was built in 2001 and hosts two annual NASCAR race weekends. The NTT IndyCar Series raced at the speedway until 2011. The speedway is owned and operated by NASCAR.

==== Entry list ====
- (R) denotes rookie driver.
- (P) denotes playoff driver.
- (i) denotes driver who is ineligible for series driver points.

No.	Driver	Team	Manufacturer
1	Ross Chastain (P)	Trackhouse Racing	Chevrolet
2	Austin Cindric (P)	Team Penske	Ford
3	Austin Dillon	Richard Childress Racing	Chevrolet
4	Noah Gragson	Front Row Motorsports	Ford
5	Kyle Larson (P)	Hendrick Motorsports	Chevrolet
6	Brad Keselowski	RFK Racing	Ford
7	Justin Haley	Spire Motorsports	Chevrolet
8	Kyle Busch	Richard Childress Racing	Chevrolet
9	Chase Elliott (P)	Hendrick Motorsports	Chevrolet
10	Ty Dillon	Kaulig Racing	Chevrolet
11	Denny Hamlin (P)	Joe Gibbs Racing	Toyota
12	Ryan Blaney (P)	Team Penske	Ford
16	A. J. Allmendinger	Kaulig Racing	Chevrolet
17	Chris Buescher	RFK Racing	Ford
19	Chase Briscoe (P)	Joe Gibbs Racing	Toyota
20	Christopher Bell (P)	Joe Gibbs Racing	Toyota
21	Josh Berry	Wood Brothers Racing	Ford
22	Joey Logano (P)	Team Penske	Ford
23	Bubba Wallace (P)	23XI Racing	Toyota
24	William Byron (P)	Hendrick Motorsports	Chevrolet
34	Todd Gilliland	Front Row Motorsports	Ford
35	Riley Herbst (R)	23XI Racing	Toyota
38	Zane Smith	Front Row Motorsports	Ford
41	Cole Custer	Haas Factory Team	Ford
42	John Hunter Nemechek	Legacy Motor Club	Toyota
43	Erik Jones	Legacy Motor Club	Toyota
44	J. J. Yeley (i)	NY Racing Team	Chevrolet
45	Tyler Reddick (P)	23XI Racing	Toyota
47	Ricky Stenhouse Jr.	Hyak Motorsports	Chevrolet
48	Alex Bowman	Hendrick Motorsports	Chevrolet
51	Cody Ware	Rick Ware Racing	Ford
54	Ty Gibbs	Joe Gibbs Racing	Toyota
60	Ryan Preece	RFK Racing	Ford
71	Michael McDowell	Spire Motorsports	Chevrolet
77	Carson Hocevar	Spire Motorsports	Chevrolet
88	Shane van Gisbergen (R)	Trackhouse Racing	Chevrolet
99	Daniel Suárez	Trackhouse Racing	Chevrolet
Official entry list

== Practice ==
Chris Buescher was the fastest in the practice session with a time of 30.672 seconds and a speed of 176.056 mph (283.335 km/h).

=== Practice results ===
Pos	No.	Driver	Team	Manufacturer	Time	Speed
1	17	Chris Buescher	RFK Racing	Ford	30.672	176.056
2	38	Zane Smith	Front Row Motorsports	Ford	30.735	175.695
3	11	Denny Hamlin (P)	Joe Gibbs Racing	Toyota	30.737	175.684
Official practice results

== Qualifying ==
Chase Briscoe scored the pole for the race with a time of 29.987 and a speed of 180.087 mph (289.822 km/h).

=== Qualifying results ===
Pos	No.	Driver	Team	Manufacturer	Time	Speed
1	19	Chase Briscoe (P)	Joe Gibbs Racing	Toyota	29.987	180.078
2	11	Denny Hamlin (P)	Joe Gibbs Racing	Toyota	30.088	179.474
3	5	Kyle Larson (P)	Hendrick Motorsports	Chevrolet	30.101	179.396
4	9	Chase Elliott (P)	Hendrick Motorsports	Chevrolet	30.157	179.063
5	20	Christopher Bell (P)	Joe Gibbs Racing	Toyota	30.165	179.015
6	77	Carson Hocevar	Spire Motorsports	Chevrolet	30.228	178.642
7	23	Bubba Wallace (P)	23XI Racing	Toyota	30.274	178.371
8	54	Ty Gibbs	Joe Gibbs Racing	Toyota	30.289	178.283
9	1	Ross Chastain (P)	Trackhouse Racing	Chevrolet	30.292	178.265
10	43	Erik Jones	Legacy Motor Club	Toyota	30.314	178.136
11	24	William Byron (P)	Hendrick Motorsports	Chevrolet	30.326	178.065
12	45	Tyler Reddick (P)	23XI Racing	Toyota	30.328	178.053
13	21	Josh Berry	Wood Brothers Racing	Ford	30.335	178.012
14	4	Noah Gragson	Front Row Motorsports	Ford	30.390	177.690
15	17	Chris Buescher	RFK Racing	Ford	30.391	177.684
16	3	Austin Dillon	Richard Childress Racing	Chevrolet	30.419	177.521
17	48	Alex Bowman	Hendrick Motorsports	Chevrolet	30.422	177.503
18	47	Ricky Stenhouse Jr.	Hyak Motorsports	Chevrolet	30.434	177.433
19	60	Ryan Preece	RFK Racing	Ford	30.438	177.410
20	16	A. J. Allmendinger	Kaulig Racing	Chevrolet	30.452	177.328
21	71	Michael McDowell	Spire Motorsports	Chevrolet	30.491	177.101
22	7	Justin Haley	Spire Motorsports	Chevrolet	30.498	177.061
23	34	Todd Gilliland	Front Row Motorsports	Ford	30.504	177.026
24	88	Shane van Gisbergen (R)	Trackhouse Racing	Chevrolet	30.528	176.887
25	42	John Hunter Nemechek	Legacy Motor Club	Toyota	30.566	176.667
26	2	Austin Cindric (P)	Team Penske	Ford	30.589	176.534
27	41	Cole Custer	Haas Factory Team	Ford	30.592	176.517
28	38	Zane Smith	Front Row Motorsports	Ford	30.631	176.292
29	8	Kyle Busch	Richard Childress Racing	Chevrolet	30.667	176.085
30	99	Daniel Suárez	Trackhouse Racing	Chevrolet	30.727	175.741
31	6	Brad Keselowski	RFK Racing	Ford	30.728	175.735
32	35	Riley Herbst (R)	23XI Racing	Toyota	30.758	175.564
33	10	Ty Dillon	Kaulig Racing	Chevrolet	30.836	175.120
34	51	Cody Ware	Rick Ware Racing	Ford	31.113	173.561
35	22	Joey Logano (P)	Team Penske	Ford	31.538	171.222
36	44	J. J. Yeley (i)	NY Racing Team	Chevrolet	32.380	167.286
37	12	Ryan Blaney (P)	Team Penske	Ford	0.000	0.000
Official qualifying results

== Race ==
=== Race results ===
==== Stage results ====
Stage One Laps: 80

Pos	No	Driver	Team	Manufacturer	Points
1	11	Denny Hamlin (P)	Joe Gibbs Racing	Toyota	10
2	5	Kyle Larson (P)	Hendrick Motorsports	Chevrolet	9
3	9	Chase Elliott (P)	Hendrick Motorsports	Chevrolet	8
4	20	Christopher Bell (P)	Joe Gibbs Racing	Toyota	7
5	1	Ross Chastain (P)	Trackhouse Racing	Chevrolet	6
6	19	Chase Briscoe (P)	Joe Gibbs Racing	Toyota	5
7	22	Joey Logano (P)	Team Penske	Ford	4
8	17	Chris Buescher	RFK Racing	Ford	3
9	38	Zane Smith	Front Row Motorsports	Ford	2
10	77	Carson Hocevar	Spire Motorsports	Chevrolet	1
Official stage one results

Stage Two Laps: 85

Pos	No	Driver	Team	Manufacturer	Points
1	11	Denny Hamlin (P)	Joe Gibbs Racing	Toyota	10
2	20	Christopher Bell (P)	Joe Gibbs Racing	Toyota	9
3	5	Kyle Larson (P)	Hendrick Motorsports	Chevrolet	8
4	9	Chase Elliott (P)	Hendrick Motorsports	Chevrolet	7
5	19	Chase Briscoe (P)	Joe Gibbs Racing	Toyota	6
6	23	Bubba Wallace (P)	23XI Racing	Toyota	5
7	22	Joey Logano (P)	Team Penske	Ford	4
8	1	Ross Chastain (P)	Trackhouse Racing	Chevrolet	3
9	12	Ryan Blaney (P)	Team Penske	Ford	2
10	48	Alex Bowman	Hendrick Motorsports	Chevrolet	1
Official stage two results

=== Final Stage results ===
Stage Three Laps: 102

Pos	Grid	No	Driver	Team	Manufacturer	Laps	Points
1	4	9	Chase Elliott (P)	Hendrick Motorsports	Chevrolet	273	55
2	2	11	Denny Hamlin (P)	Joe Gibbs Racing	Toyota	273	56
3	5	20	Christopher Bell (P)	Joe Gibbs Racing	Toyota	273	50
4	1	19	Chase Briscoe (P)	Joe Gibbs Racing	Toyota	273	44
5	7	23	Bubba Wallace (P)	23XI Racing	Toyota	273	37
6	3	5	Kyle Larson (P)	Hendrick Motorsports	Chevrolet	273	48
7	12	45	Tyler Reddick (P)	23XI Racing	Toyota	273	30
8	31	6	Brad Keselowski	RFK Racing	Ford	273	29
9	11	24	William Byron (P)	Hendrick Motorsports	Chevrolet	273	28
10	24	88	Shane van Gisbergen (R)	Trackhouse Racing	Chevrolet	273	27
11	9	1	Ross Chastain (P)	Trackhouse Racing	Chevrolet	273	35
12	23	34	Todd Gilliland	Front Row Motorsports	Ford	273	25
13	33	10	Ty Dillon	Kaulig Racing	Chevrolet	273	24
14	21	71	Michael McDowell	Spire Motorsports	Chevrolet	273	23
15	15	17	Chris Buescher	RFK Racing	Ford	273	25
16	10	43	Erik Jones	Legacy Motor Club	Toyota	273	21
17	30	99	Daniel Suárez	Trackhouse Racing	Chevrolet	273	20
18	22	7	Justin Haley	Spire Motorsports	Chevrolet	273	19
19	29	8	Kyle Busch	Richard Childress Racing	Chevrolet	273	18
20	27	41	Cole Custer	Haas Factory Team	Ford	273	17
21	35	22	Joey Logano (P)	Team Penske	Ford	273	24
22	32	35	Riley Herbst (R)	23XI Racing	Toyota	273	15
23	14	4	Noah Gragson	Front Row Motorsports	Ford	273	14
24	37	12	Ryan Blaney (P)	Team Penske	Ford	273	15
25	8	54	Ty Gibbs	Joe Gibbs Racing	Toyota	272	12
26	19	60	Ryan Preece	RFK Racing	Ford	271	11
27	16	3	Austin Dillon	Richard Childress Racing	Chevrolet	271	10
28	17	48	Alex Bowman	Hendrick Motorsports	Chevrolet	271	10
29	6	77	Carson Hocevar	Spire Motorsports	Chevrolet	269	9
30	26	2	Austin Cindric (P)	Team Penske	Ford	269	7
31	28	38	Zane Smith	Front Row Motorsports	Ford	266	8
32	25	42	John Hunter Nemechek	Legacy Motor Club	Toyota	266	5
33	13	21	Josh Berry	Wood Brothers Racing	Ford	266	4
34	36	44	J. J. Yeley (i)	NY Racing Team	Chevrolet	261	0
35	18	47	Ricky Stenhouse Jr.	Hyak Motorsports	Chevrolet	236	2
36	20	16	A. J. Allmendinger	Kaulig Racing	Chevrolet	216	1
37	34	51	Cody Ware	Rick Ware Racing	Ford	52	1
Official race results

=== Race statistics ===
- Lead changes: 20 among 11 different drivers
- Cautions/Laps: 9 for 48 laps
- Red flags: 1 for 8 minutes and 48 seconds
- Time of race: 3 hours, 19 minutes, and 35 seconds
- Average speed: 123.106 miles per hour (198.120 km/h)
- Margin of victory: 0.069 seconds

== Media ==
=== Television ===
USA covered the race on the television side. Leigh Diffey, Jeff Burton, and Steve Letarte called the race from the broadcast booth. Dave Burns, Kim Coon, and Marty Snider handled the pit road duties from pit lane.

USA
Booth announcers	Pit reporters
Lap-by-lap: Leigh Diffey; Color-commentator: Jeff Burton; Color-commentator: Steve Letarte	Dave Burns; Kim Coon; Marty Snider

=== Radio ===
MRN had the radio call for the race, which was also simulcast on Sirius XM NASCAR Radio. Alex Hayden, Mike Bagley, and former NASCAR Cup Series Championship Crew Chief Todd Gordon called the race for MRN when the field raced thru the front straightaway. Dave Moody covered the race from the Sunoco spotters stand outside turn 2 when the field will race through turns 1 and 2. Kurt Becker called the race from a platform outside turn 4. Lead MRN Radio Pit Reporter Steve Post, Chris Wilner, Winston Kelley and Brienne Pedigo covered the action for MRN from pit lane.

MRN
Booth announcers	Turn announcers	Pit reporters
Lead announcer: Alex Hayden; Announcer: Mike Bagley; Announcer: Todd Gordon	Turns 1 & 2: Dave Moody; Turns 3 & 4: Kurt Becker	Steve Post; Chris Wilner; Winston Kelley; Brienne Pedigo

== Standings after the race ==
Drivers' Championship standings

	Pos	Driver	Points
2	1	Kyle Larson	3,124
3	2	Denny Hamlin	3,118 (–6)
1	3	Christopher Bell	3,114 (–10)
2	4	William Byron	3,110 (–14)
2	5	Chase Elliott	3,104 (–20)
5	6	Ryan Blaney	3,099 (–25)
1	7	Chase Briscoe	3,091 (–33)
2	8	Joey Logano	3,083 (–41)
	9	Ross Chastain	3,070 (–54)
2	10	Bubba Wallace	3,057 (–67)
	11	Tyler Reddick	3,054 (–70)
2	12	Austin Cindric	3,035 (–89)
	13	Alex Bowman	2,091 (–1,033)
1	14	Shane van Gisbergen	2,086 (–1,038)
1	15	Austin Dillon	2,086 (–1,038)
	16	Josh Berry	2,057 (–1,067)
Official driver's standings

Manufacturers' Championship standings

Pos	Manufacturer	Points
1	Chevrolet	1,130
2	Toyota	1,106 (–24)
3	Ford	1,036 (–94)

- Note: Only the first 16 positions are included for the driver standings.

Previous race: 2025 Mobil 1 301	NASCAR Cup Series; 2025 season	Next race: 2025 Bank of America Roval 400
