= 2024 Ally 400 =

NASCAR Cup Series race

Race details
- Race 19 of 36 in the 2024 NASCAR Cup Series
- Date: June 30, 2024
- Location: Nashville Superspeedway in Lebanon, Tennessee
- Course: Permanent racing facility
- Course length: 1.333 miles (2.145 km)
- Distance: 331 laps, 441.223 mi (705.956 km)
- Scheduled distance: 300 laps, 400 mi (640 km)
- Average speed: 108.298 miles per hour (174.289 km/h)

Pole position
Driver	Denny Hamlin	Joe Gibbs Racing
- Time: 29.859

Most laps led
Driver	Christopher Bell	Joe Gibbs Racing
- Laps: 131

Winner
No. 22	Joey Logano	Team Penske

Television in the United States
- Network: NBC/USA
- Announcers: Rick Allen, Jeff Burton and Steve Letarte
- Nielsen ratings: 3.24 million

Radio in the United States
- Radio: PRN
- Booth announcers: Doug Rice, Mark Garrow, and Cole Custer
- Turn announcers: Rob Albright (1–2) and Pat Patterson (3–4)

The 2024 Ally 400 was a NASCAR Cup Series race held on June 30, 2024, at Nashville Superspeedway in Lebanon, Tennessee. Contested over 331 laps—extended from 300 laps due to an overtime finish and broke the NASCAR record for the most overtime attempts with five attempts on the 1 1/3-mile (2.146 km) speedway, it was the 19th race of the 2024 NASCAR Cup Series season. Joey Logano won the race, his 33rd career win, and first since the Atlanta spring race in 2023. Zane Smith finished 2nd, his best career finish, and Tyler Reddick finished 3rd. Ryan Preece and Chris Buescher rounded out the top five, and Ryan Blaney, Bubba Wallace, Kyle Larson, Daniel Hemric, and Noah Gragson rounded out the top ten.

== Report ==
=== Background ===
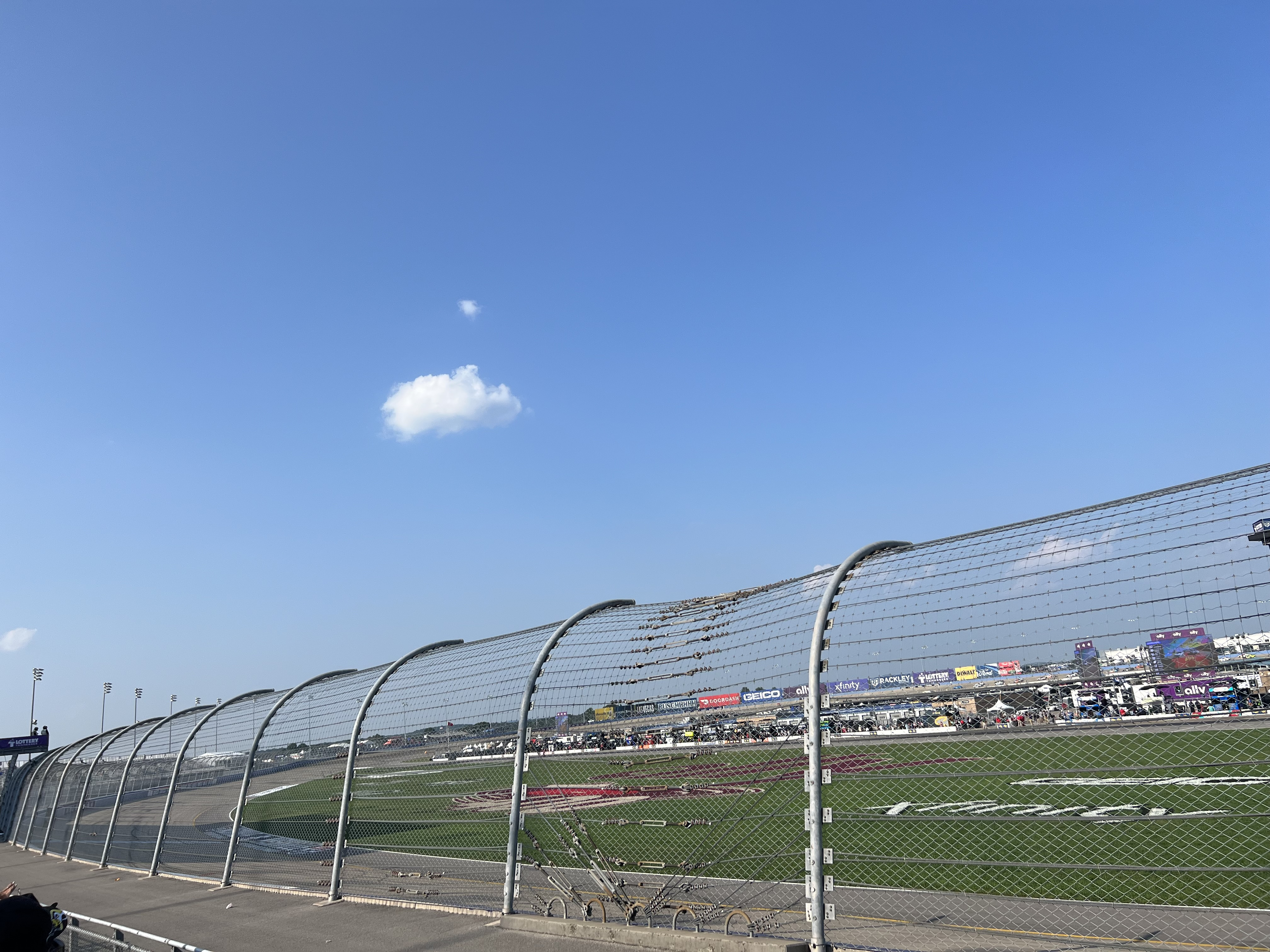
Nashville Superspeedway, where the race was held.

Nashville Superspeedway is a motor racing complex located in Lebanon, Tennessee, United States, about 30 miles (48 km) southeast of Nashville. The track was built in 2001 and is currently used for events, driving schools and GT Academy, a reality television competition.

It is a concrete oval track 1 1/3 miles (2.146 km) long. Nashville Superspeedway is owned by Dover Motorsports, Inc., which also owns Dover International Speedway. Nashville Superspeedway was the longest concrete oval in NASCAR during the time it was on the NASCAR Xfinity Series and NASCAR Craftsman Truck Series circuits. Current permanent seating capacity is approximately 25,000. Additional portable seats are brought in for some events, and seating capacity can be expanded to 150,000. Infrastructure is in place to expand the facility to include a short track, drag strip, and road course.

==== Entry list ====
- (R) denotes rookie driver.
- (i) denotes driver who is ineligible for series driver points.

No.	Driver	Team	Manufacturer
1	Ross Chastain	Trackhouse Racing	Chevrolet
2	Austin Cindric	Team Penske	Ford
3	Austin Dillon	Richard Childress Racing	Chevrolet
4	Josh Berry (R)	Stewart-Haas Racing	Ford
5	Kyle Larson	Hendrick Motorsports	Chevrolet
6	Brad Keselowski	RFK Racing	Ford
7	Corey LaJoie	Spire Motorsports	Chevrolet
8	Kyle Busch	Richard Childress Racing	Chevrolet
9	Chase Elliott	Hendrick Motorsports	Chevrolet
10	Noah Gragson	Stewart-Haas Racing	Ford
11	Denny Hamlin	Joe Gibbs Racing	Toyota
12	Ryan Blaney	Team Penske	Ford
14	Chase Briscoe	Stewart-Haas Racing	Ford
15	Riley Herbst (i)	Rick Ware Racing	Ford
16	A. J. Allmendinger (i)	Kaulig Racing	Chevrolet
17	Chris Buescher	RFK Racing	Ford
19	Martin Truex Jr.	Joe Gibbs Racing	Toyota
20	Christopher Bell	Joe Gibbs Racing	Toyota
21	Harrison Burton	Wood Brothers Racing	Ford
22	Joey Logano	Team Penske	Ford
23	Bubba Wallace	23XI Racing	Toyota
24	William Byron	Hendrick Motorsports	Chevrolet
31	Daniel Hemric	Kaulig Racing	Chevrolet
34	Michael McDowell	Front Row Motorsports	Ford
38	Todd Gilliland	Front Row Motorsports	Ford
41	Ryan Preece	Stewart-Haas Racing	Ford
42	John Hunter Nemechek	Legacy Motor Club	Toyota
43	Erik Jones	Legacy Motor Club	Toyota
45	Tyler Reddick	23XI Racing	Toyota
47	Ricky Stenhouse Jr.	JTG Daugherty Racing	Chevrolet
48	Alex Bowman	Hendrick Motorsports	Chevrolet
50	Corey Heim (i)	23XI Racing	Toyota
51	Justin Haley	Rick Ware Racing	Ford
54	Ty Gibbs	Joe Gibbs Racing	Toyota
66	Chad Finchum (i)	MBM Motorsports	Ford
71	Zane Smith (R)	Spire Motorsports	Chevrolet
77	Carson Hocevar (R)	Spire Motorsports	Chevrolet
99	Daniel Suárez	Trackhouse Racing	Chevrolet
Official entry list

== Practice ==
Ty Gibbs was the fastest in the practice session with a time of 30.059 seconds and a speed of 159.287 mph (256.348 km/h).

=== Practice results ===
Pos	No.	Driver	Team	Manufacturer	Time	Speed
1	54	Ty Gibbs	Joe Gibbs Racing	Toyota	30.059	159.287
2	12	Ryan Blaney	Team Penske	Ford	30.222	158.428
3	23	Bubba Wallace	23XI Racing	Toyota	30.256	158.250
Official practice results

== Qualifying ==
Denny Hamlin scored the pole for the race with a 29.859 time of and a speed of 160.354 mph (258.065 km/h).

=== Qualifying results ===
Pos	No.	Driver	Team	Manufacturer	R1	R2
1	11	Denny Hamlin	Joe Gibbs Racing	Toyota	30.012	29.859
2	4	Josh Berry (R)	Stewart–Haas Racing	Ford	30.088	29.972
3	20	Christopher Bell	Joe Gibbs Racing	Toyota	30.022	29.954
4	5	Kyle Larson	Hendrick Motorsports	Chevrolet	30.035	29.981
5	6	Brad Keselowski	RFK Racing	Ford	30.208	30.012
6	45	Tyler Reddick	23XI Racing	Toyota	30.094	30.000
7	24	William Byron	Hendrick Motorsports	Chevrolet	30.160	30.013
8	54	Ty Gibbs	Joe Gibbs Racing	Toyota	30.149	30.028
9	17	Chris Buescher	RFK Racing	Ford	30.204	30.101
10	2	Austin Cindric	Team Penske	Ford	30.251	30.134
11	3	Austin Dillon	Richard Childress Racing	Chevrolet	30.223	—
12	48	Alex Bowman	Hendrick Motorsports	Chevrolet	30.284	—
13	9	Chase Elliott	Hendrick Motorsports	Chevrolet	30.226	—
14	34	Michael McDowell	Front Row Motorsports	Ford	30.293	—
15	77	Carson Hocevar (R)	Spire Motorsports	Chevrolet	30.268	—
16	10	Noah Gragson	Stewart-Haas Racing	Ford	30.324	—
17	19	Martin Truex Jr.	Joe Gibbs Racing	Toyota	30.294	—
18	12	Ryan Blaney	Team Penske	Ford	30.334	—
19	14	Chase Briscoe	Stewart-Haas Racing	Ford	30.314	—
20	1	Ross Chastain	Trackhouse Racing	Chevrolet	30.338	—
21	7	Corey LaJoie	Spire Motorsports	Chevrolet	30.350	—
22	41	Ryan Preece	Stewart-Haas Racing	Ford	30.437	—
23	47	Ricky Stenhouse Jr.	JTG Daugherty Racing	Chevrolet	30.372	—
24	23	Bubba Wallace	23XI Racing	Toyota	30.454	—
25	21	Harrison Burton	Wood Brothers Racing	Ford	30.388	—
26	22	Joey Logano	Team Penske	Ford	30.473	—
27	8	Kyle Busch	Richard Childress Racing	Chevrolet	30.439	—
28	16	A. J. Allmendinger (i)	Kaulig Racing	Chevrolet	30.475	—
29	50	Corey Heim (i)	23XI Racing	Toyota	30.453	—
30	15	Riley Herbst (i)	Rick Ware Racing	Ford	30.656	—
31	99	Daniel Suárez	Trackhouse Racing	Chevrolet	30.557	—
32	38	Todd Gilliland	Front Row Motorsports	Ford	30.722	—
33	51	Justin Haley	Rick Ware Racing	Ford	30.577	—
34	43	Erik Jones	Legacy Motor Club	Toyota	30.738	—
35	42	John Hunter Nemechek	Legacy Motor Club	Toyota	30.588	—
36	71	Zane Smith (R)	Spire Motorsports	Chevrolet	30.779	—
37	31	Daniel Hemric	Kaulig Racing	Chevrolet	30.594	—
38	66	Chad Finchum (i)	MBM Motorsports	Ford	32.706	—
Official qualifying results

== Race ==
=== Race results ===
==== Stage results ====
Stage One Laps: 90

Pos	No	Driver	Team	Manufacturer	Points
1	20	Christopher Bell	Joe Gibbs Racing	Toyota	10
2	11	Denny Hamlin	Joe Gibbs Racing	Toyota	9
3	45	Tyler Reddick	23XI Racing	Toyota	8
4	5	Kyle Larson	Hendrick Motorsports	Chevrolet	7
5	6	Brad Keselowski	RFK Racing	Ford	6
6	54	Ty Gibbs	Joe Gibbs Racing	Toyota	5
7	24	William Byron	Hendrick Motorsports	Chevrolet	4
8	17	Chris Buescher	RFK Racing	Ford	3
9	19	Martin Truex Jr.	Joe Gibbs Racing	Toyota	2
10	23	Bubba Wallace	23XI Racing	Toyota	1
Official stage one results

Stage Two Laps: 95

Pos	No	Driver	Team	Manufacturer	Points
1	20	Christopher Bell	Joe Gibbs Racing	Toyota	10
2	45	Tyler Reddick	23XI Racing	Toyota	9
3	5	Kyle Larson	Hendrick Motorsports	Chevrolet	8
4	11	Denny Hamlin	Joe Gibbs Racing	Toyota	7
5	6	Brad Keselowski	RFK Racing	Ford	6
6	9	Chase Elliott	Hendrick Motorsports	Chevrolet	5
7	19	Martin Truex Jr.	Joe Gibbs Racing	Toyota	4
8	12	Ryan Blaney	Team Penske	Ford	3
9	17	Chris Buescher	RFK Racing	Ford	2
10	10	Noah Gragson	Stewart-Haas Racing	Ford	1
Official stage two results

=== Final Stage results ===
Stage Three Laps: 115

Pos	Grid	No	Driver	Team	Manufacturer	Laps	Points
1	26	22	Joey Logano	Team Penske	Ford	331	40
2	36	71	Zane Smith (R)	Spire Motorsports	Chevrolet	331	35
3	6	45	Tyler Reddick	23XI Racing	Toyota	331	51
4	22	41	Ryan Preece	Stewart-Haas Racing	Ford	331	33
5	9	17	Chris Buescher	RFK Racing	Ford	331	37
6	18	12	Ryan Blaney	Team Penske	Ford	331	34
7	24	23	Bubba Wallace	23XI Racing	Toyota	331	31
8	4	5	Kyle Larson	Hendrick Motorsports	Chevrolet	331	44
9	37	31	Daniel Hemric	Kaulig Racing	Chevrolet	331	28
10	16	10	Noah Gragson	Stewart-Haas Racing	Ford	331	28
11	28	16	A. J. Allmendinger (i)	Kaulig Racing	Chevrolet	331	0
12	1	11	Denny Hamlin	Joe Gibbs Racing	Toyota	331	41
13	33	51	Justin Haley	Rick Ware Racing	Ford	331	24
14	12	48	Alex Bowman	Hendrick Motorsports	Chevrolet	331	23
15	10	2	Austin Cindric	Team Penske	Ford	331	22
16	15	77	Carson Hocevar (R) (Note: Hocevar was docked 25 points for intentionally wrecking Harrison Burton under caution.)	Spire Motorsports	Chevrolet	331	-4
17	32	38	Todd Gilliland	Front Row Motorsports	Ford	331	20
18	13	9	Chase Elliott	Hendrick Motorsports	Chevrolet	331	24
19	7	24	William Byron	Hendrick Motorsports	Chevrolet	331	22
20	21	7	Corey LaJoie	Spire Motorsports	Chevrolet	331	17
21	19	14	Chase Briscoe	Stewart-Haas Racing	Ford	331	16
22	31	99	Daniel Suárez	Trackhouse Racing	Chevrolet	331	15
23	8	54	Ty Gibbs	Joe Gibbs Racing	Toyota	331	19
24	17	19	Martin Truex Jr.	Joe Gibbs Racing	Toyota	331	19
25	5	6	Brad Keselowski	RFK Racing	Ford	330	24
26	2	4	Josh Berry (R)	Stewart-Haas Racing	Ford	327	11
27	27	8	Kyle Busch	Richard Childress Racing	Ford	319	10
28	25	21	Harrison Burton	Wood Brothers Racing	Ford	312	9
29	29	50	Corey Heim (i)	23XI Racing	Toyota	312	0
30	23	47	Ricky Stenhouse Jr.	JTG Daugherty Racing	Chevrolet	312	7
31	35	42	John Hunter Nemechek	Legacy Motor Club	Toyota	306	6
32	11	3	Austin Dillon	Richard Childress Racing	Chevrolet	305	5
33	20	1	Ross Chastain	Trackhouse Racing	Chevrolet	304	4
34	34	43	Erik Jones	Legacy Motor Club	Toyota	287	3
35	14	34	Michael McDowell	Front Row Motorsports	Ford	239	2
36	3	20	Christopher Bell	Joe Gibbs Racing	Toyota	227	21
37	30	15	Riley Herbst (i)	Rick Ware Racing	Ford	201	0
38	38	66	Chad Finchum (i)	MBM Motorsports	Ford	132	0
Official race results

=== Race statistics ===
- Lead changes: 20 among 11 different drivers
- Cautions/Laps: 15 for 79
- Red flags: 1 for 1 hour, 21 minutes, and 20 seconds
- Time of race: 4 hours, 3 minutes, and 54 seconds
- Average speed: 108.298 miles per hour (174.289 km/h)

== Media ==
=== Television ===
NBC covered the race on the television side, but was switched to USA Network at 7:30pm ET (6:30pm CT) due to US Olympic Team trials. Rick Allen, Jeff Burton, and Steve Letarte called the race from the broadcast booth. Dave Burns, Kim Coon, and Marty Snider handled the pit road duties from pit lane.

NBC/USA
Booth announcers	Pit reporters
Lap-by-lap: Rick Allen; Color-commentator: Jeff Burton; Color-commentator: Steve Letarte	Dave Burns; Kim Coon; Marty Snider

=== Radio ===
Radio coverage of the race was broadcast by the Performance Racing Network (PRN), and was also simulcasted on Sirius XM NASCAR Radio.

PRN
Booth announcers	Turn announcers	Pit reporters
Lead announcer: Doug Rice; Announcer: Mark Garrow; Announcer: Cole Custer	Turns 1 & 2: Rob Albright; Turns 3 & 4: Pat Patterson	Brad Gillie; Brett McMillan; Wendy Venturini

== Standings after the race ==
Drivers' Championship standings

	Pos	Driver	Points
	1	Kyle Larson	664
	2	Chase Elliott	644 (–20)
	3	Denny Hamlin	621 (–43)
1	4	Tyler Reddick	611 (–53)
1	5	Martin Truex Jr.	591 (–73)
	6	Christopher Bell	576 (–88)
	7	William Byron	570 (–94)
	8	Ryan Blaney	560 (–104)
1	9	Brad Keselowski	531 (–133)
1	10	Ty Gibbs	518 (–146)
2	11	Ross Chastain	514 (–150)
	12	Chris Buescher	504 (–160)
1	13	Alex Bowman	499 (–165)
	14	Joey Logano	470 (–194)
	15	Bubba Wallace	448 (–216)
	16	Chase Briscoe	421 (–243)
Official driver's standings

Manufacturers' Championship standings

Pos	Manufacturer	Points
1	Chevrolet	685
2	Toyota	681 (–4)
3	Ford	663 (–22)

- Note: Only the first 16 positions are included for the driver standings.
- . – Driver has clinched a position in the NASCAR Cup Series playoffs.

== Notes ==
Previous race: 2024 USA Today 301	NASCAR Cup Series; 2024 season	Next race: 2024 Grant Park 165
