= 2022 NextEra Energy 250 =

First race of the 2022 NASCAR Camping World Truck Series

Race details
- Race 1 of 23 of the 2022 NASCAR Camping World Truck Series
- Date: February 18, 2022
- Official name: NextEra Energy 250
- Location: Daytona Beach, Florida, Daytona International Speedway
- Course: Permanent racing facility
- Course length: 2.5 miles (4 km)
- Distance: 106 laps, 265 mi (426.476 km)
- Scheduled distance: 100 laps, 250 mi (402.336 km)

Television in the United States
- Network: Fox Sports 1
- Announcers: Vince Welch, Michael Waltrip, Kurt Busch

Radio in the United States
- Radio: Motor Racing Network

The 2022 NextEra Energy 250 was the first stock car race of the 2022 NASCAR Camping World Truck Series season and was the 23rd iteration of the event. The race was held on Friday, February 18, 2022, in Daytona Beach, Florida, at Daytona International Speedway, a 2.5 mile (4 km) permanent asphalt superspeedway. The race was extended from 100 laps to 106 laps due to a NASCAR overtime finish. At race's end, the race was won by Zane Smith under caution after a wreck had occurred on the final lap. The win was Smith's fourth career NASCAR Camping World Truck Series win and his first win of the season. To fill out the podium, Ben Rhodes and Christian Eckes of ThorSport Racing would finish second and third, respectively.

== Background ==
Daytona International Speedway is one of three superspeedways to hold NASCAR races, the other two being Indianapolis Motor Speedway and Talladega Superspeedway. The standard track at Daytona International Speedway is a four-turn superspeedway that is 2.5 miles (4.0 km) long. The track's turns are banked at 31 degrees, while the front stretch, the location of the finish line, is banked at 18 degrees.

=== Entry list ===
#	Driver	Team	Make
1	Hailie Deegan	David Gilliland Racing	Ford
02	Jesse Little	Young's Motorsports	Chevrolet
3	Jordan Anderson	Jordan Anderson Racing	Chevrolet
4	John Hunter Nemechek	Kyle Busch Motorsports	Toyota
7	Austin Hill (i)	Spire Motorsports	Chevrolet
9	Blaine Perkins (R)	CR7 Motorsports	Chevrolet
10	Jennifer Jo Cobb	Jennifer Jo Cobb Racing	Chevrolet
12	Spencer Boyd	Young's Motorsports	Chevrolet
15	Tanner Gray	David Gilliland Racing	Ford
16	Tyler Ankrum	Hattori Racing Enterprises	Toyota
17	Riley Herbst (i)	David Gilliland Racing	Ford
18	Chandler Smith	Kyle Busch Motorsports	Toyota
19	Derek Kraus	McAnally-Hilgemann Racing	Chevrolet
20	Danny Bohn	Young's Motorsports	Chevrolet
22	Austin Wayne Self	AM Racing	Chevrolet
23	Grant Enfinger	GMS Racing	Chevrolet
24	Jack Wood (R)	GMS Racing	Chevrolet
25	Matt DiBenedetto	Rackley WAR	Chevrolet
28	Bryan Dauzat	FDNY Racing	Chevrolet
30	Tate Fogleman	On Point Motorsports	Toyota
32	Bret Holmes	Bret Holmes Racing	Chevrolet
33	Jason White	Reaume Brothers Racing	Toyota
38	Zane Smith	Front Row Motorsports	Ford
40	Dean Thompson (R)	Niece Motorsports	Chevrolet
42	Carson Hocevar	Niece Motorsports	Chevrolet
43	Thad Moffitt	Reaume Brothers Racing	Chevrolet
44	Kris Wright	Niece Motorsports	Chevrolet
45	Lawless Alan (R)	Niece Motorsports	Chevrolet
46	Matt Jaskol	G2G Racing	Toyota
47	Johnny Sauter	G2G Racing	Toyota
51	Corey Heim (R)	Kyle Busch Motorsports	Toyota
52	Stewart Friesen	Halmar Friesen Racing	Toyota
56	Timmy Hill	Hill Motorsports	Toyota
61	Chase Purdy	Hattori Racing Enterprises	Toyota
66	Ty Majeski	ThorSport Racing	Toyota
75	Parker Kligerman	Henderson Motorsports	Chevrolet
84	Clay Greenfield	Cook Racing Technologies	Toyota
88	Matt Crafton	ThorSport Racing	Toyota
91	Colby Howard	McAnally-Hilgemann Racing	Chevrolet
97	Jason Kitzmiller*	CR7 Motorsports	Chevrolet
98	Christian Eckes	ThorSport Racing	Toyota
99	Ben Rhodes	ThorSport Racing	Toyota
Official entry list

*Withdrew due to wrecking in the practice session.

== Practice ==
The only 50-minute practice session was held on Thursday, February 17, at 4:35 PM EST. Grant Enfinger was fastest in the session, with a time of 48.117 seconds and a speed of 187.044 mph (301.018 km/h).

Pos.	#	Driver	Team	Make	Time	Speed
1	23	Grant Enfinger	GMS Racing	Chevrolet	48.117	187.044
2	19	Derek Kraus	McAnally-Hilgemann Racing	Chevrolet	48.131	186.990
3	38	Zane Smith	Front Row Motorsports	Ford	48.136	186.970
Full practice results

== Qualifying ==
Qualifying was held on Friday, February 18, at 3:00 PM EST. Since Daytona International Speedway is a superspeedway, the qualifying system used is a single-car, single-lap system with two rounds. In the first round, drivers have one lap to set a time. The fastest ten drivers from the first round move on to the second round. Whoever sets the fastest time in Round 2 wins the pole.

Ty Majeski of ThorSport Racing would win the pole, setting a lap of 50.245 and an average speed of 179.122 miles per hour (288.269 km/h) in the second round.

Five drivers would fail to qualify: Jordan Anderson, Jennifer Jo Cobb, Matt Jaskol, Chase Purdy, and Clay Greenfield.

=== Full qualifying results ===
Pos.	#	Driver	Team	Make	Time (R1)	Speed (R1)	Time (R2)	Speed (R2)
1	66	Ty Majeski	ThorSport Racing	Toyota	50.277	179.008	50.245	179.122
2	4	John Hunter Nemechek	Kyle Busch Motorsports	Toyota	50.179	179.358	50.308	178.898
3	18	Chandler Smith	Kyle Busch Motorsports	Toyota	50.593	177.890	50.660	177.655
4	16	Tyler Ankrum	Hattori Racing Enterprises	Toyota	50.533	178.101	50.719	177.448
5	52	Stewart Friesen	Halmar Friesen Racing	Toyota	50.673	177.609	50.736	177.389
6	51	Corey Heim (R)	Kyle Busch Motorsports	Toyota	50.586	177.915	50.749	177.343
7	23	Grant Enfinger	GMS Racing	Chevrolet	50.564	177.992	50.751	177.336
8	17	Riley Herbst (i)	David Gilliland Racing	Ford	50.720	177.445	51.044	176.318
9	02	Jesse Little	Young's Motorsports	Chevrolet	50.705	177.497	51.055	176.280
10	45	Lawless Alan (R)	Niece Motorsports	Chevrolet	50.712	177.473	—	—
Eliminated in Round 1
11	24	Jack Wood (R)	GMS Racing	Chevrolet	50.727	177.420	—	—
12	44	Kris Wright	Niece Motorsports	Chevrolet	50.755	177.322	—	—
13	7	Austin Hill (i)	Spire Motorsports	Chevrolet	50.781	177.232	—	—
14	98	Christian Eckes	ThorSport Racing	Toyota	50.785	177.218	—	—
15	12	Spencer Boyd	Young's Motorsports	Chevrolet	50.795	177.183	—	—
16	22	Austin Wayne Self	AM Racing	Chevrolet	50.813	177.120	—	—
17	40	Dean Thompson (R)	Niece Motorsports	Chevrolet	50.831	177.057	—	—
18	91	Colby Howard	McAnally-Hilgemann Racing	Chevrolet	50.839	177.029	—	—
19	9	Blaine Perkins (R)	CR7 Motorsports	Chevrolet	50.841	177.022	—	—
20	38	Zane Smith	Front Row Motorsports	Ford	50.879	176.890	—	—
21	32	Bret Holmes	Bret Holmes Racing	Chevrolet	50.883	176.876	—	—
22	42	Carson Hocevar	Niece Motorsports	Chevrolet	50.891	176.849	—	—
23	25	Matt DiBenedetto	Rackley WAR	Chevrolet	50.893	176.842	—	—
24	15	Tanner Gray	David Gilliland Racing	Ford	50.914	176.769	—	—
25	28	Bryan Dauzat	FDNY Racing	Chevrolet	50.947	176.654	—	—
26	1	Hailie Deegan	David Gilliland Racing	Ford	50.950	176.644	—	—
27	99	Ben Rhodes	ThorSport Racing	Toyota	50.951	176.640	—	—
28	20	Danny Bohn	Young's Motorsports	Chevrolet	51.046	176.312	—	—
29	88	Matt Crafton	ThorSport Racing	Toyota	51.110	176.091	—	—
30	19	Derek Kraus	McAnally-Hilgemann Racing	Chevrolet	51.155	175.936	—	—
31	75	Parker Kligerman	Henderson Motorsports	Chevrolet	51.212	175.740	—	—
Qualified by owner's points
32	30	Tate Fogleman	On Point Motorsports	Toyota	51.610	174.385	—	—
33	33	Jason White	Reaume Brothers Racing	Toyota	52.344	171.939	—	—
34	43	Thad Moffitt	Reaume Brothers Racing	Chevrolet	53.848	167.137	—	—
35	56	Timmy Hill	Hill Motorsports	Toyota	54.774	164.312	—	—
Champion's Provisional
36	47	Johnny Sauter	G2G Racing	Toyota	52.553	171.256	—	—
Failed to qualify
37	3	Jordan Anderson	Jordan Anderson Racing	Chevrolet	51.221	175.709	—	—
38	10	Jennifer Jo Cobb	Jennifer Jo Cobb Racing	Chevrolet	51.349	175.271	—	—
39	46	Matt Jaskol	G2G Racing	Toyota	51.399	175.101	—	—
40	61	Chase Purdy	Hattori Racing Enterprises	Toyota	51.411	175.060	—	—
41	84	Clay Greenfield	Cook Racing Technologies	Toyota	52.415	171.707	—	—
Withdrew
WD	97	Jason Kitzmiller	CR7 Motorsports	Chevrolet	—	—	—	—
Official qualifying results
Official starting lineup

== Race results ==
Stage 1 Laps: 20

Pos.	#	Driver	Team	Make	Pts
1	4	John Hunter Nemechek	Kyle Busch Motorsports	Toyota	10
2	18	Chandler Smith	Kyle Busch Motorsports	Toyota	9
3	52	Stewart Friesen	Halmar Friesen Racing	Toyota	8
4	51	Corey Heim (R)	Kyle Busch Motorsports	Toyota	7
5	38	Zane Smith	Front Row Motorsports	Ford	6
6	23	Grant Enfigner	GMS Racing	Chevrolet	5
7	66	Ty Majeski	ThorSport Racing	Toyota	4
8	15	Tanner Gray	David Gilliland Racing	Ford	3
9	32	Bret Holmes	Bret Holmes Racing	Chevrolet	2
10	16	Tyler Ankrum	Hattori Racing Enterprises	Toyota	1

Stage 2 Laps: 20

Pos.	#	Driver	Team	Make	Pts
1	4	John Hunter Nemechek	Kyle Busch Motorsports	Toyota	10
2	99	Ben Rhodes	ThorSport Racing	Toyota	9
3	18	Chandler Smith	Kyle Busch Motorsports	Toyota	8
4	98	Christian Eckes	ThorSport Racing	Toyota	7
5	88	Matt Crafton	ThorSport Racing	Toyota	6
6	22	Austin Wayne Self	AM Racing	Chevrolet	5
7	16	Tyler Ankrum	Hattori Racing Enterprises	Toyota	4
8	19	Derek Kraus	McAnally-Hilgemann Racing	Chevrolet	3
9	7	Austin Hill (i)	Spire Motorsports	Chevrolet	0
10	66	Ty Majeski	ThorSport Racing	Toyota	1

Stage 3 Laps: 66

Fin.	St	#	Driver	Team	Make	Laps	Led	Status	Pts
1	20	38	Zane Smith	Front Row Motorsports	Ford	106	3	running	46
2	27	99	Ben Rhodes	ThorSport Racing	Toyota	106	6	running	44
3	14	98	Christian Eckes	ThorSport Racing	Toyota	106	9	running	41
4	24	15	Tanner Gray	David Gilliland Racing	Ford	106	0	running	36
5	31	75	Parker Kligerman	Henderson Motorsports	Chevrolet	106	0	running	32
6	9	02	Jesse Little	Young's Motorsports	Chevrolet	106	0	running	31
7	1	66	Ty Majeski	ThorSport Racing	Toyota	106	21	running	35
8	28	20	Danny Bohn	Young's Motorsports	Chevrolet	106	0	running	29
9	22	42	Carson Hocevar	Niece Motorsports	Chevrolet	106	0	running	28
10	23	25	Matt DiBenedetto	Rackley WAR	Chevrolet	106	0	running	27
11	15	12	Spencer Boyd	Young's Motorsports	Chevrolet	106	0	running	26
12	8	17	Riley Herbst (i)	David Gilliland Racing	Ford	106	0	running	0
13	16	22	Austin Wayne Self	AM Racing	Chevrolet	106	0	running	29
14	35	56	Timmy Hill	Hill Motorsports	Toyota	106	0	running	23
15	13	7	Austin Hill (i)	Spire Motorsports	Chevrolet	106	1	running	0
16	5	52	Stewart Friesen	Halmar Friesen Racing	Toyota	106	2	running	29
17	26	1	Hailie Deegan	David Gilliland Racing	Ford	106	0	running	20
18	34	43	Thad Moffitt	Reaume Brothers Racing	Chevrolet	106	0	running	19
19	12	44	Kris Wright	Niece Motorsports	Chevrolet	106	0	running	18
20	33	33	Jason White	Reaume Brothers Racing	Toyota	105	0	accident	17
21	3	18	Chandler Smith	Kyle Busch Motorsports	Toyota	105	0	running	33
22	33	30	Tate Fogleman	On Point Motorsports	Toyota	105	0	running	15
23	25	28	Bryan Dauzat	FDNY Racing	Chevrolet	105	0	running	14
24	2	4	John Hunter Nemechek	Kyle Busch Motorsports	Toyota	104	50	running	33
25	10	45	Lawless Alan (R)	Niece Motorsports	Chevrolet	103	0	accident	12
26	30	19	Derek Kraus	McAnally-Hilgemann Racing	Chevrolet	101	1	accident	14
27	29	88	Matt Crafton	ThorSport Racing	Toyota	100	0	accident	16
28	4	16	Tyler Ankrum	Hattori Racing Enterprises	Toyota	99	4	accident	14
29	7	23	Grant Enfinger	GMS Racing	Chevrolet	99	0	accident	13
30	18	91	Colby Howard	McAnally-Hilgemann Racing	Chevrolet	99	9	accident	7
31	19	9	Blaine Perkins (R)	CR7 Motorsports	Chevrolet	99	0	accident	6
32	6	51	Corey Heim (R)	Kyle Busch Motorsports	Toyota	91	0	accident	12
33	11	24	Jack Wood (R)	GMS Racing	Chevrolet	63	0	accident	4
34	36	47	Johnny Sauter	G2G Racing	Toyota	60	0	electrical	3
35	21	32	Bret Holmes	Bret Holmes Racing	Chevrolet	44	0	clutch	4
36	17	40	Dean Thompson (R)	Niece Motorsports	Chevrolet	36	0	brakes	1
Failed to qualify or withdrew
37		3	Jordan Anderson	Jordan Anderson Racing	Chevrolet				
38		10	Jennifer Jo Cobb	Jennifer Jo Cobb Racing	Chevrolet				
39		46	Matt Jaskol	G2G Racing	Toyota				
40		61	Chase Purdy	Hattori Racing Enterprises	Toyota				
41		84	Clay Greenfield	Cook Racing Technologies	Toyota				
WD		97	Jason Kitzmiller	CR7 Motorsports	Chevrolet				
Official race results

== Standings after the race ==
Drivers' Championship standings

Pos	Driver	Points
1	Zane Smith	46
2	Ben Rhodes	44 (-2)
3	Christian Eckes	41 (-5)
4	Tanner Gray	36 (-10)
5	Ty Majeski	35 (-11)
6	Chandler Smith	33 (-13)
7	John Hunter Nemechek	33 (-13)
8	Parker Kligerman	32 (-14)
9	Jesse Little	31 (-15)
10	Danny Bohn	29 (-17)
Official driver's standings

- Note: Only the first 10 positions are included for the driver standings.

Previous race: 2021 Lucas Oil 150	NASCAR Camping World Truck Series; 2022 season	Next race: 2022 Victoria's Voice Foundation 200
