= 2024 USA Today 301 =

NASCAR Cup Series race

Race details
- Race 18 of 36 in the 2024 NASCAR Cup Series
- Date: June 23, 2024
- Location: New Hampshire Motor Speedway in Loudon, New Hampshire
- Course: Permanent racing facility
- Course length: 1.058 miles (1.703 km)
- Distance: 305 laps, 322.69 mi (519.415 km)
- Scheduled distance: 301 laps, 318.458 mi (512.603 km)
- Average speed: 84.832 miles per hour (136.524 km/h)

Pole position
Driver	Chase Elliott	Hendrick Motorsports
- Time: 3.250 (Pandemic Formula)

Most laps led
Driver	Christopher Bell	Joe Gibbs Racing
- Laps: 149

Winner
No. 20	Christopher Bell	Joe Gibbs Racing

Television in the United States
- Network: USA
- Announcers: Rick Allen, Jeff Burton and Steve Letarte
- Nielsen ratings: 1.0 (1.88 million)

Radio in the United States
- Radio: PRN
- Booth announcers: Doug Rice and Mark Garrow
- Turn announcers: Rob Albright (1 & 2) and Pat Patterson (3 & 4)

The 2024 USA Today 301 was a NASCAR Cup Series race held on June 23, 2024, at New Hampshire Motor Speedway in Loudon, New Hampshire. Contested over 305 laps—extended from 301 laps due to an overtime finish, on the 1.058-mile (1.703 km) speedway, it was the 18th race of the 2024 NASCAR Cup Series season. Christopher Bell won the race, his 9th career win, and his 3rd of the 2024 season. Chase Briscoe finished 2nd, and Josh Berry finished 3rd. Kyle Larson and Chris Buescher rounded out the top five, and Tyler Reddick, Ricky Stenhouse Jr., John Hunter Nemechek, Martin Truex Jr., and Ross Chastain rounded out the top ten.

== Report ==
=== Background ===
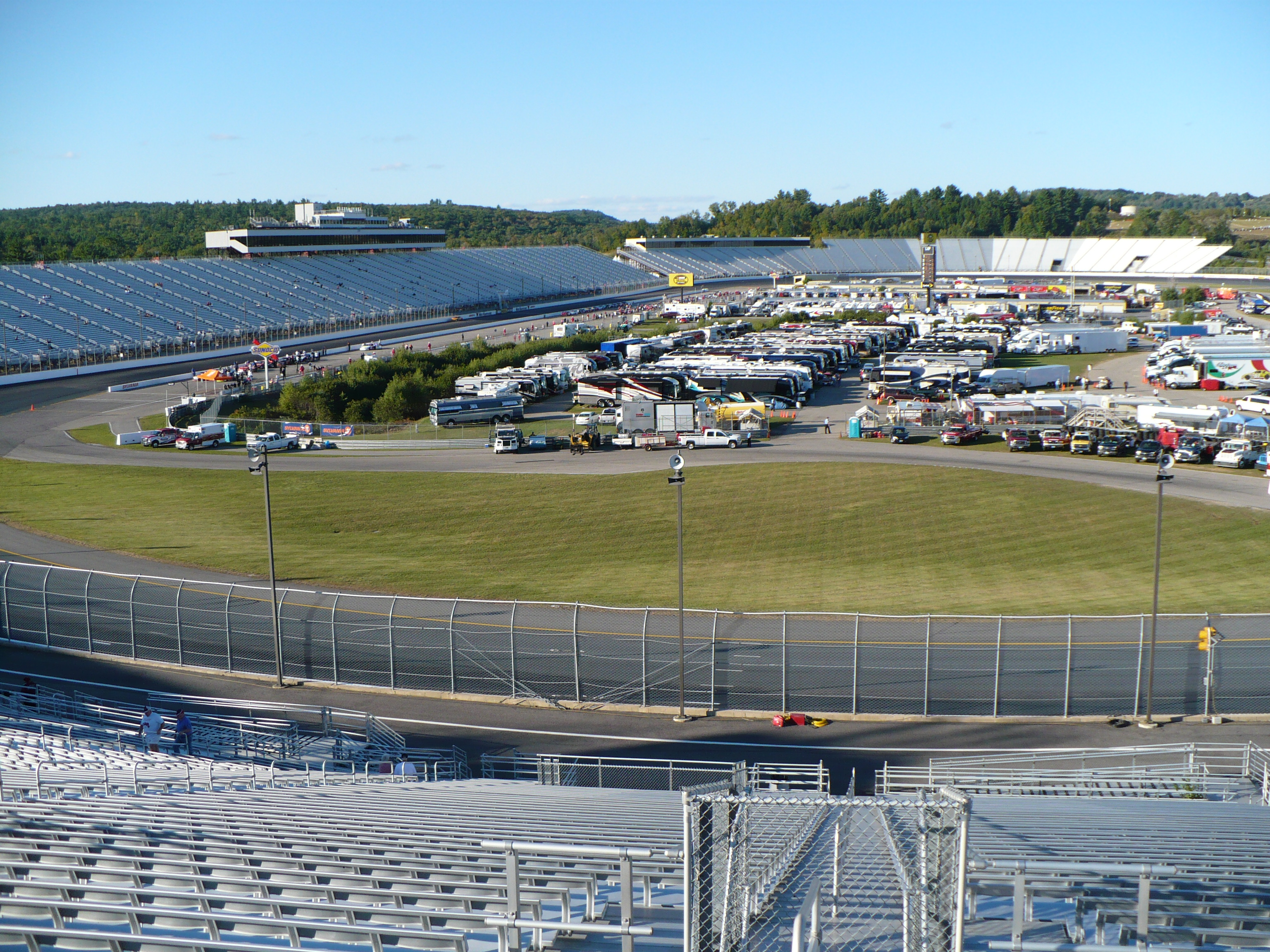
New Hampshire Motor Speedway, the track where the race was held.

New Hampshire Motor Speedway is a 1.058-mile (1.703 km) oval speedway located in Loudon, New Hampshire, which has hosted NASCAR racing annually since the early 1990s, as well as the longest-running motorcycle race in North America, the Loudon Classic. Nicknamed "The Magic Mile", the speedway is often converted into a 1.6-mile (2.6 km) road course, which includes much of the oval.

The track was originally the site of Bryar Motorsports Park before being purchased and redeveloped by Bob Bahre. The track is currently one of eight major NASCAR tracks owned and operated by Speedway Motorsports.

==== Entry list ====
- (R) denotes rookie driver.
- (i) denotes driver who is ineligible for series driver points.

No.	Driver	Team	Manufacturer
1	Ross Chastain	Trackhouse Racing	Chevrolet
2	Austin Cindric	Team Penske	Ford
3	Austin Dillon	Richard Childress Racing	Chevrolet
4	Josh Berry (R)	Stewart-Haas Racing	Ford
5	Kyle Larson	Hendrick Motorsports	Chevrolet
6	Brad Keselowski	RFK Racing	Ford
7	Corey LaJoie	Spire Motorsports	Chevrolet
8	Kyle Busch	Richard Childress Racing	Chevrolet
9	Chase Elliott	Hendrick Motorsports	Chevrolet
10	Noah Gragson	Stewart-Haas Racing	Ford
11	Denny Hamlin	Joe Gibbs Racing	Toyota
12	Ryan Blaney	Team Penske	Ford
14	Chase Briscoe	Stewart-Haas Racing	Ford
15	Kaz Grala (R)	Rick Ware Racing	Ford
16	Ty Dillon (i)	Kaulig Racing	Chevrolet
17	Chris Buescher	RFK Racing	Ford
19	Martin Truex Jr.	Joe Gibbs Racing	Toyota
20	Christopher Bell	Joe Gibbs Racing	Toyota
21	Harrison Burton	Wood Brothers Racing	Ford
22	Joey Logano	Team Penske	Ford
23	Bubba Wallace	23XI Racing	Toyota
24	William Byron	Hendrick Motorsports	Chevrolet
31	Daniel Hemric	Kaulig Racing	Chevrolet
34	Michael McDowell	Front Row Motorsports	Ford
38	Todd Gilliland	Front Row Motorsports	Ford
41	Ryan Preece	Stewart-Haas Racing	Ford
42	John Hunter Nemechek	Legacy Motor Club	Toyota
43	Erik Jones	Legacy Motor Club	Toyota
45	Tyler Reddick	23XI Racing	Toyota
47	Ricky Stenhouse Jr.	JTG Daugherty Racing	Chevrolet
48	Alex Bowman	Hendrick Motorsports	Chevrolet
51	Justin Haley	Rick Ware Racing	Ford
54	Ty Gibbs	Joe Gibbs Racing	Toyota
71	Zane Smith (R)	Spire Motorsports	Chevrolet
77	Carson Hocevar (R)	Spire Motorsports	Chevrolet
99	Daniel Suárez	Trackhouse Racing	Chevrolet
Official entry list

== Practice ==
Carson Hocevar was the fastest in the practice session with a time of 29.865 seconds and a speed of 127.534 mph (205.246 km/h).

=== Practice results ===
Pos	No.	Driver	Team	Manufacturer	Time	Speed
1	77	Carson Hocevar (R)	Spire Motorsports	Chevrolet	29.865	127.534
2	34	Michael McDowell	Front Row Motorsports	Ford	29.917	127.312
3	6	Brad Keselowski	RFK Racing	Ford	29.940	127.214
Official practice results

== Qualifying ==
Qualifying for the race was cancelled due to inclement weather. Chase Elliott will start on the pole was awarded the pole for the race as a result of NASCAR's pandemic formula with a score of 3.250

=== Starting lineup ===
Pos	No.	Driver	Team	Manufacturer
1	9	Chase Elliott	Hendrick Motorsports	Chevrolet
2	12	Ryan Blaney	Team Penske	Ford
3	24	William Byron	Hendrick Motorsports	Chevrolet
4	20	Christopher Bell	Joe Gibbs Racing	Toyota
5	48	Alex Bowman	Hendrick Motorsports	Chevrolet
6	22	Joey Logano	Team Penske	Ford
7	19	Martin Truex Jr.	Joe Gibbs Racing	Toyota
8	1	Ross Chastain	Trackhouse Racing	Chevrolet
9	6	Brad Keselowski	RFK Racing	Ford
10	4	Josh Berry (R)	Stewart-Haas Racing	Ford
11	99	Daniel Suárez	Trackhouse Racing	Chevrolet
12	45	Tyler Reddick	23XI Racing	Toyota
13	47	Ricky Stenhouse Jr.	JTG Daugherty Racing	Chevrolet
14	11	Denny Hamlin	Joe Gibbs Racing	Toyota
15	17	Chris Buescher	RFK Racing	Ford
16	38	Todd Gilliland	Front Row Motorsports	Ford
17	23	Bubba Wallace	23XI Racing	Toyota
18	54	Ty Gibbs	Joe Gibbs Racing	Toyota
19	5	Kyle Larson	Hendrick Motorsports	Chevrolet
20	77	Carson Hocevar (R)	Spire Motorsports	Chevrolet
21	10	Noah Gragson	Stewart-Haas Racing	Ford
22	3	Austin Dillon	Richard Childress Racing	Chevrolet
23	14	Chase Briscoe	Stewart-Haas Racing	Ford
24	51	Justin Haley	Rick Ware Racing	Ford
25	34	Michael McDowell	Front Row Motorsports	Ford
26	7	Corey LaJoie	Spire Motorsports	Chevrolet
27	21	Harrison Burton	Wood Brothers Racing	Ford
28	42	John Hunter Nemechek	Legacy Motor Club	Toyota
29	2	Austin Cindric	Team Penske	Ford
30	8	Kyle Busch	Richard Childress Racing	Chevrolet
31	41	Ryan Preece	Stewart-Haas Racing	Ford
32	43	Erik Jones	Legacy Motor Club	Toyota
33	31	Daniel Hemric	Kaulig Racing	Chevrolet
34	71	Zane Smith (R)	Spire Motorsports	Chevrolet
35	15	Kaz Grala (R)	Rick Ware Racing	Ford
36	16	Ty Dillon (i)	Kaulig Racing	Chevrolet
Official starting lineup

== Race ==
=== Race results ===
==== Stage results ====
Stage One Laps: 70

Pos	No	Driver	Team	Manufacturer	Points
1	20	Christopher Bell	Joe Gibbs Racing	Toyota	10
2	22	Joey Logano	Team Penske	Ford	9
3	9	Chase Elliott	Hendrick Motorsports	Chevrolet	8
4	12	Ryan Blaney	Team Penske	Ford	7
5	4	Josh Berry (R)	Stewart-Haas Racing	Ford	6
6	19	Martin Truex Jr.	Joe Gibbs Racing	Toyota	5
7	11	Denny Hamlin	Joe Gibbs Racing	Toyota	4
8	1	Ross Chastain	Trackhouse Racing	Chevrolet	3
9	45	Tyler Reddick	23XI Racing	Toyota	2
10	48	Alex Bowman	Hendrick Motorsports	Chevrolet	1
Official stage one results

Stage Two Laps: 115

Pos	No	Driver	Team	Manufacturer	Points
1	11	Denny Hamlin	Joe Gibbs Racing	Toyota	10
2	19	Martin Truex Jr.	Joe Gibbs Racing	Toyota	9
3	22	Joey Logano	Team Penske	Ford	8
4	20	Christopher Bell	Joe Gibbs Racing	Toyota	7
5	12	Ryan Blaney	Team Penske	Ford	6
6	38	Todd Gilliland	Front Row Motorsports	Ford	5
7	5	Kyle Larson	Hendrick Motorsports	Chevrolet	4
8	4	Josh Berry (R)	Stewart-Haas Racing	Ford	3
9	9	Chase Elliott	Hendrick Motorsports	Chevrolet	2
10	1	Ross Chastain	Trackhouse Racing	Chevrolet	1
Official stage two results

=== Final Stage results ===
Stage Three Laps: 116

Pos	Grid	No	Driver	Team	Manufacturer	Laps	Points
1	4	20	Christopher Bell	Joe Gibbs Racing	Toyota	305	57
2	23	14	Chase Briscoe	Stewart-Haas Racing	Ford	305	35
3	10	4	Josh Berry (R)	Stewart-Haas Racing	Ford	305	43
4	19	5	Kyle Larson	Hendrick Motorsports	Chevrolet	305	37
5	15	17	Chris Buescher	RFK Racing	Ford	305	32
6	12	45	Tyler Reddick	23XI Racing	Toyota	305	33
7	13	47	Ricky Stenhouse Jr.	JTG Daugherty Racing	Chevrolet	305	30
8	28	42	John Hunter Nemechek	Legacy Motor Club	Toyota	305	29
9	7	19	Martin Truex Jr.	Joe Gibbs Racing	Toyota	305	42
10	8	1	Ross Chastain	Trackhouse Racing	Chevrolet	305	31
11	31	41	Ryan Preece	Stewart-Haas Racing	Ford	305	26
12	16	38	Todd Gilliland	Front Row Motorsports	Ford	305	30
13	32	43	Erik Jones	Legacy Motor Club	Toyota	305	24
14	27	21	Harrison Burton	Wood Brothers Racing	Ford	305	23
15	25	34	Michael McDowell	Front Row Motorsports	Ford	305	22
16	18	54	Ty Gibbs	Joe Gibbs Racing	Toyota	305	21
17	20	77	Carson Hocevar (R)	Spire Motorsports	Chevrolet	305	20
18	1	9	Chase Elliott	Hendrick Motorsports	Chevrolet	305	29
19	29	2	Austin Cindric	Team Penske	Ford	305	18
20	36	16	Ty Dillon (i)	Kaulig Racing	Chevrolet	305	0
21	11	99	Daniel Suárez	Trackhouse Racing	Chevrolet	305	16
22	35	15	Kaz Grala (R)	Rick Ware Racing	Ford	305	15
23	26	7	Corey LaJoie	Spire Motorsports	Chevrolet	305	14
24	14	11	Denny Hamlin	Joe Gibbs Racing	Toyota	305	27
25	2	12	Ryan Blaney	Team Penske	Ford	305	25
26	3	24	William Byron	Hendrick Motorsports	Chevrolet	305	11
27	21	10	Noah Gragson	Stewart-Haas Racing	Ford	305	10
28	9	6	Brad Keselowski	RFK Racing	Ford	305	9
29	24	51	Justin Haley	Rick Ware Racing	Ford	305	8
30	35	71	Zane Smith (R)	Spire Motorsports	Chevrolet	304	7
31	33	31	Daniel Hemric	Kaulig Racing	Chevrolet	303	6
32	6	22	Joey Logano	Team Penske	Ford	305	22
33	22	3	Austin Dillon	Richard Childress Racing	Chevrolet	268	4
34	17	23	Bubba Wallace	23XI Racing	Toyota	265	3
35	30	8	Kyle Busch	Richard Childress Racing	Chevrolet	222	2
36	5	48	Alex Bowman	Hendrick Motorsports	Chevrolet	142	2
Official race results

=== Race statistics ===
- Lead changes: 6 among 5 different drivers
- Cautions/Laps: 14 for 85
- Red flags: 1 for 2 hours, 14 minutes, and 49 seconds
- Time of race: 3 hours, 48 minutes, and 14 seconds
- Average speed: 84.832 miles per hour (136.524 km/h)

== Media ==
=== Television ===
USA covered the race on the television side. Rick Allen, four-time and all-time Loudon winner Jeff Burton, and Steve Letarte called the race from the broadcast booth. Kim Coon, Parker Kligerman, and Marty Snider handled the pit road duties from pit lane.

USA
Booth announcers	Pit reporters
Lap-by-lap: Rick Allen; Color-commentator: Jeff Burton; Color-commentator: Steve Letarte	Kim Coon; Parker Kligerman; Marty Snider

=== Radio ===
PRN had the radio call for the race, which was also simulcast on Sirius XM NASCAR Radio. Doug Rice and Mark Garrow called the race from the booth when the field races down the frontstretch. Rob Albright called the race from turns 1 & 2 and Pat Patterson called the race from turns 3 & 4. Brad Gillie, Brett McMillan and Alan Cavanna handled the duties on pit lane.

PRN
Booth announcers	Turn announcers	Pit reporters
Lead announcer: Doug Rice; Announcer: Mark Garrow	Turns 1 & 2: Rob Albright; Turns 3 & 4: Pat Patterson	Brad Gillie; Brett McMillan; Alan Cavanna

== Standings after the race ==
Drivers' Championship standings

	Pos	Driver	Points
1	1	Kyle Larson	620
1	2	Chase Elliott	620 (–0)
	3	Denny Hamlin	580 (–40)
1	4	Martin Truex Jr.	572 (–48)
1	5	Tyler Reddick	560 (–60)
2	6	Christopher Bell	555 (–65)
3	7	William Byron	548 (–72)
1	8	Ryan Blaney	526 (–94)
1	9	Ross Chastain	510 (–110)
1	10	Brad Keselowski	507 (–113)
	11	Ty Gibbs	499 (–121)
	12	Alex Bowman	476 (–144)
	13	Chris Buescher	467 (–153)
1	14	Joey Logano	430 (–190)
1	15	Bubba Wallace	417 (–203)
1	16	Chase Briscoe	405 (–215)
Official driver's standings

Manufacturers' Championship standings

Pos	Manufacturer	Points
1	Chevrolet	650
2	Toyota	647 (–3)
3	Ford	623 (–27)

- Note: Only the first 16 positions are included for the driver standings.
- . – Driver has clinched a position in the NASCAR Cup Series playoffs.

Previous race: 2024 Iowa Corn 350	NASCAR Cup Series; 2024 season	Next race: 2024 Ally 400
