= 2024 NASCAR Cup Series =

American motorsport season

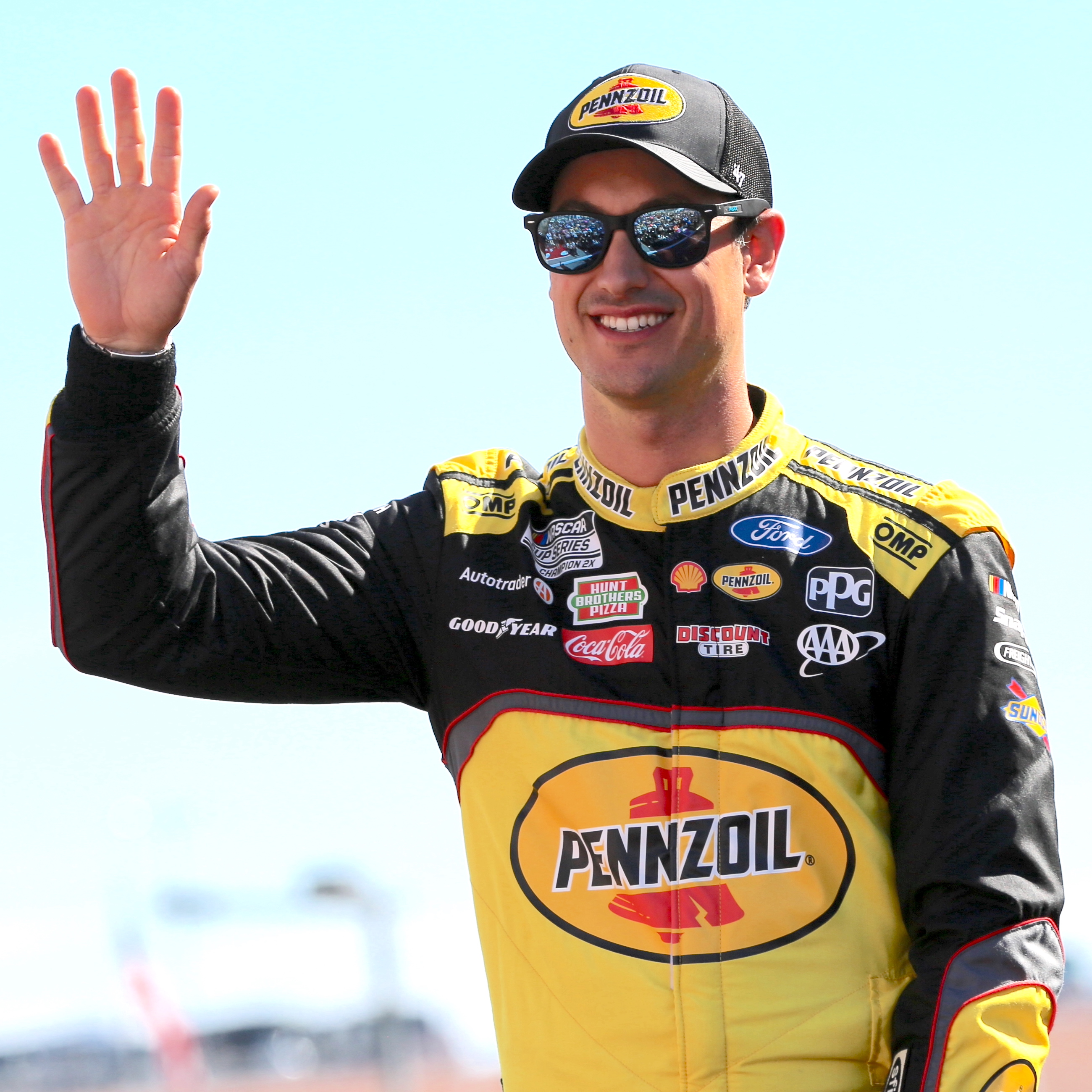
Joey Logano won his third Cup Series championship.

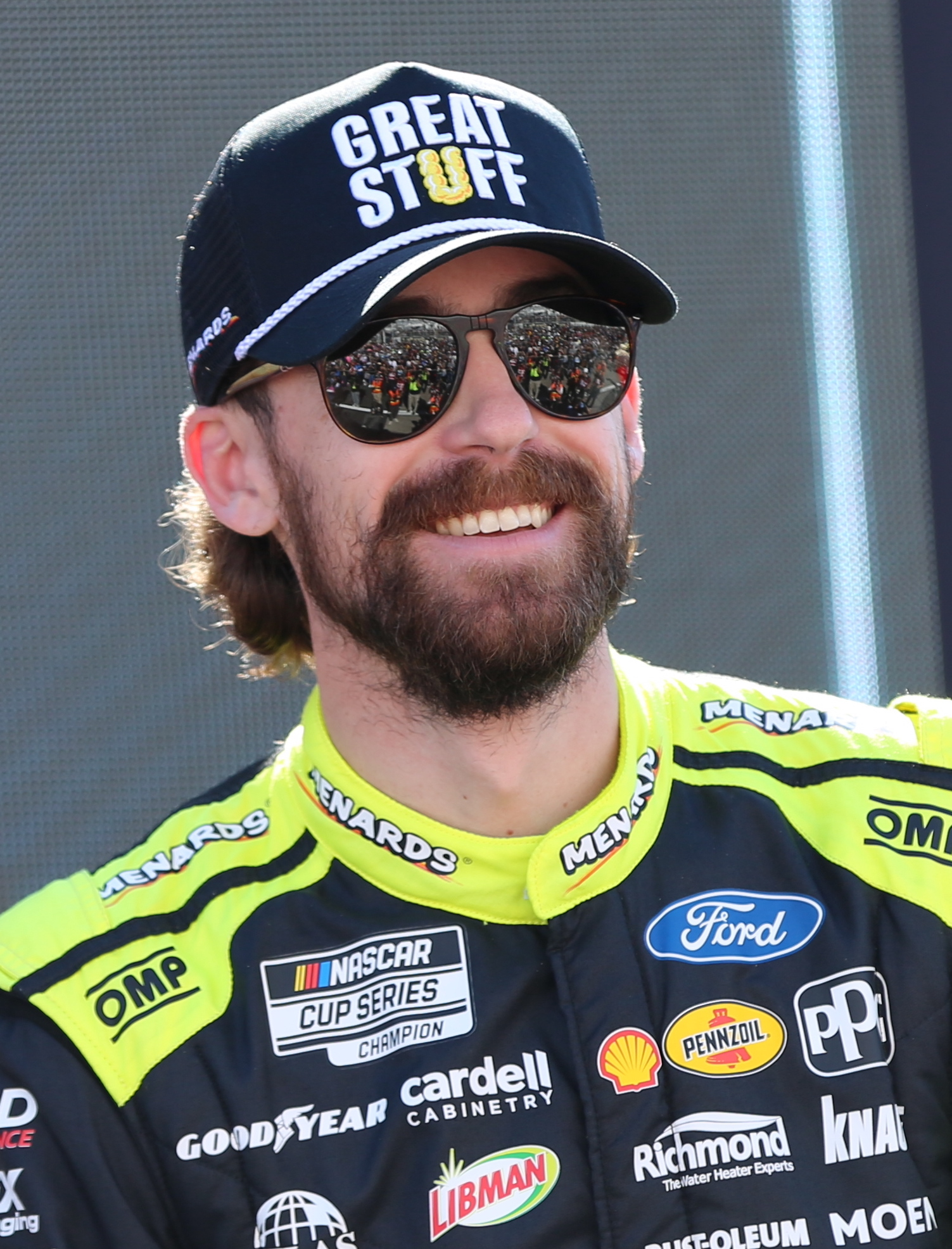
Ryan Blaney, the defending Cup Series champion, finished second in the standings.

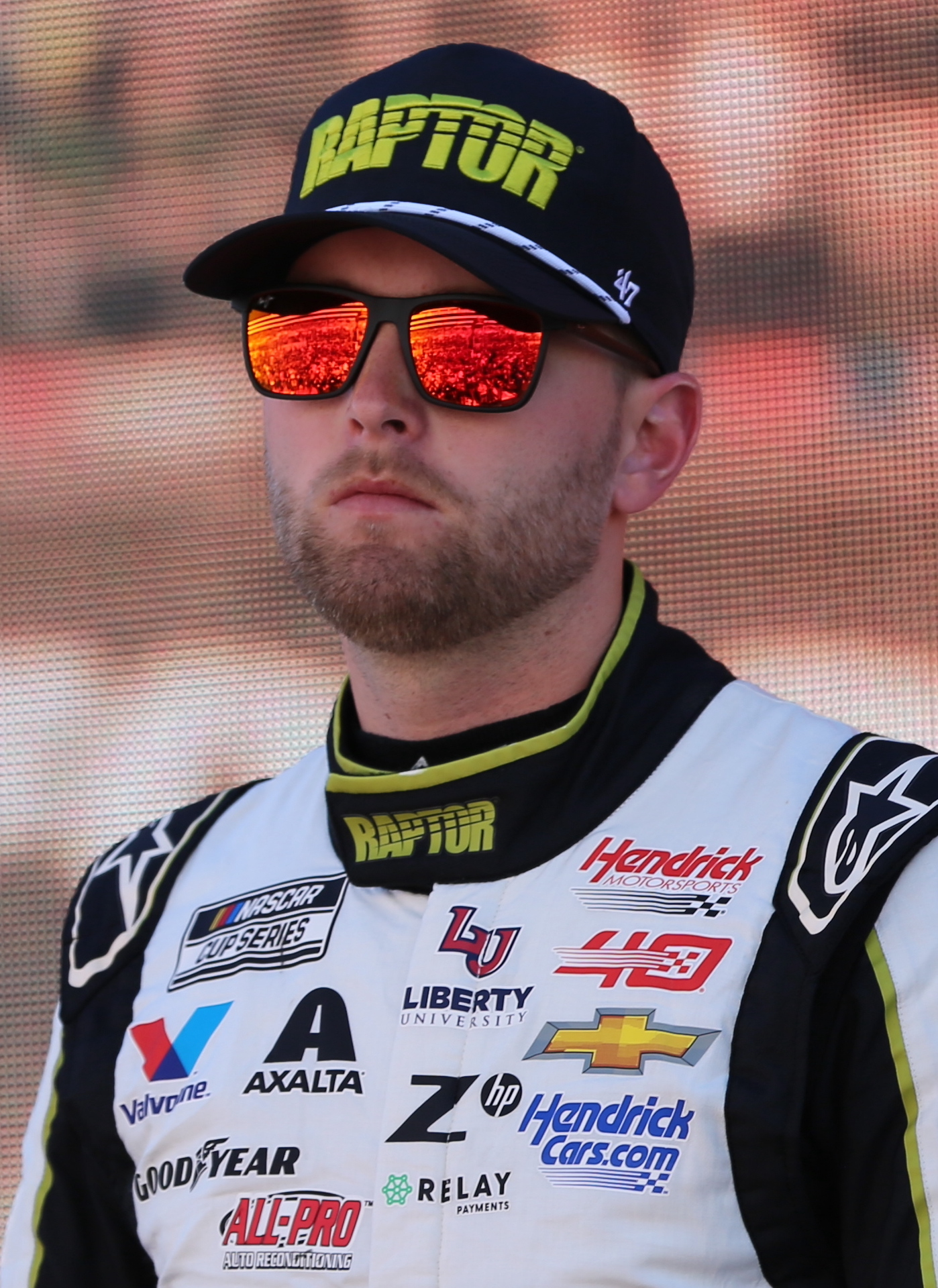
William Byron finished third in the standings.

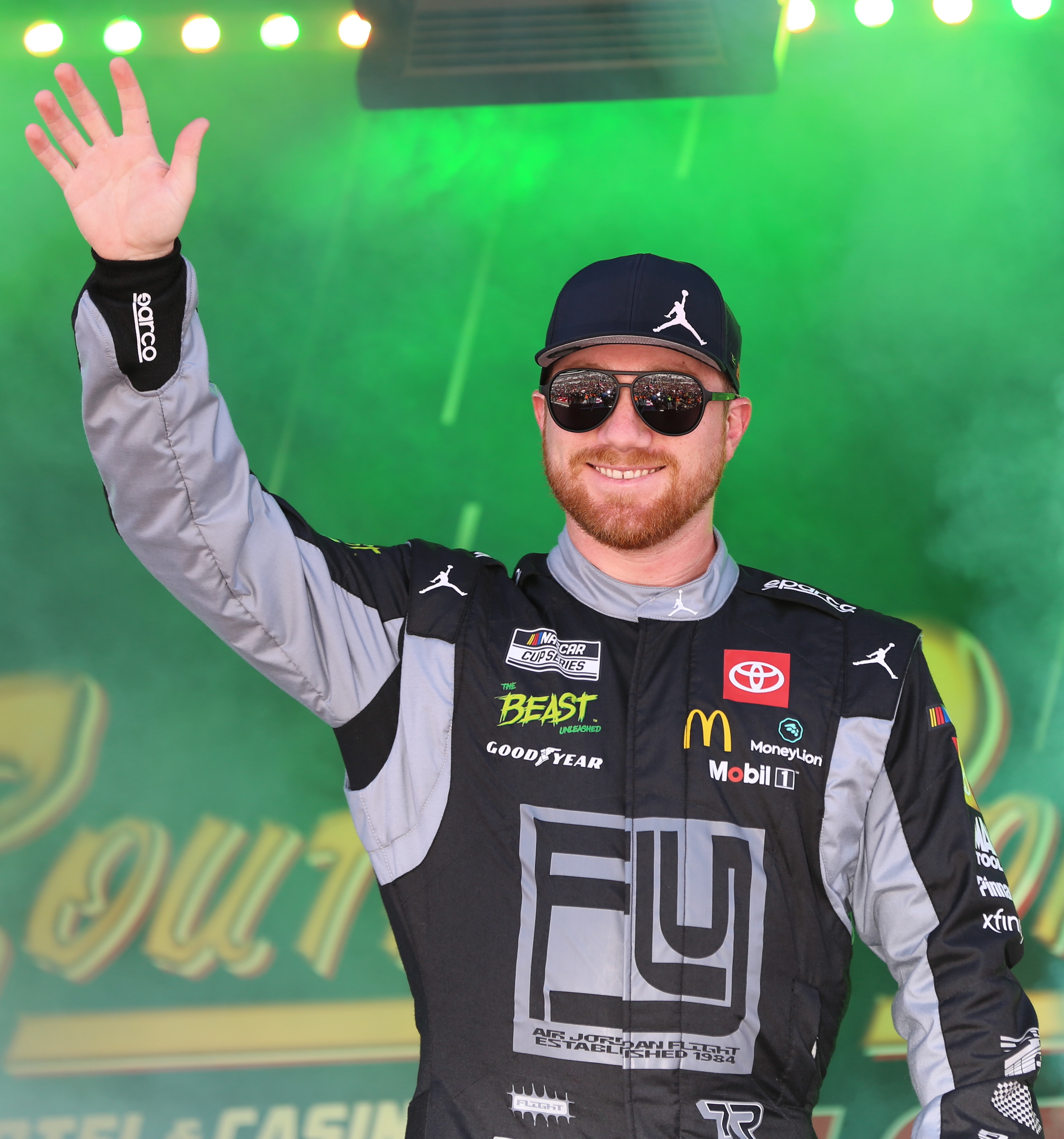
Tyler Reddick, the Regular Season Champion, finished fourth in the standings.

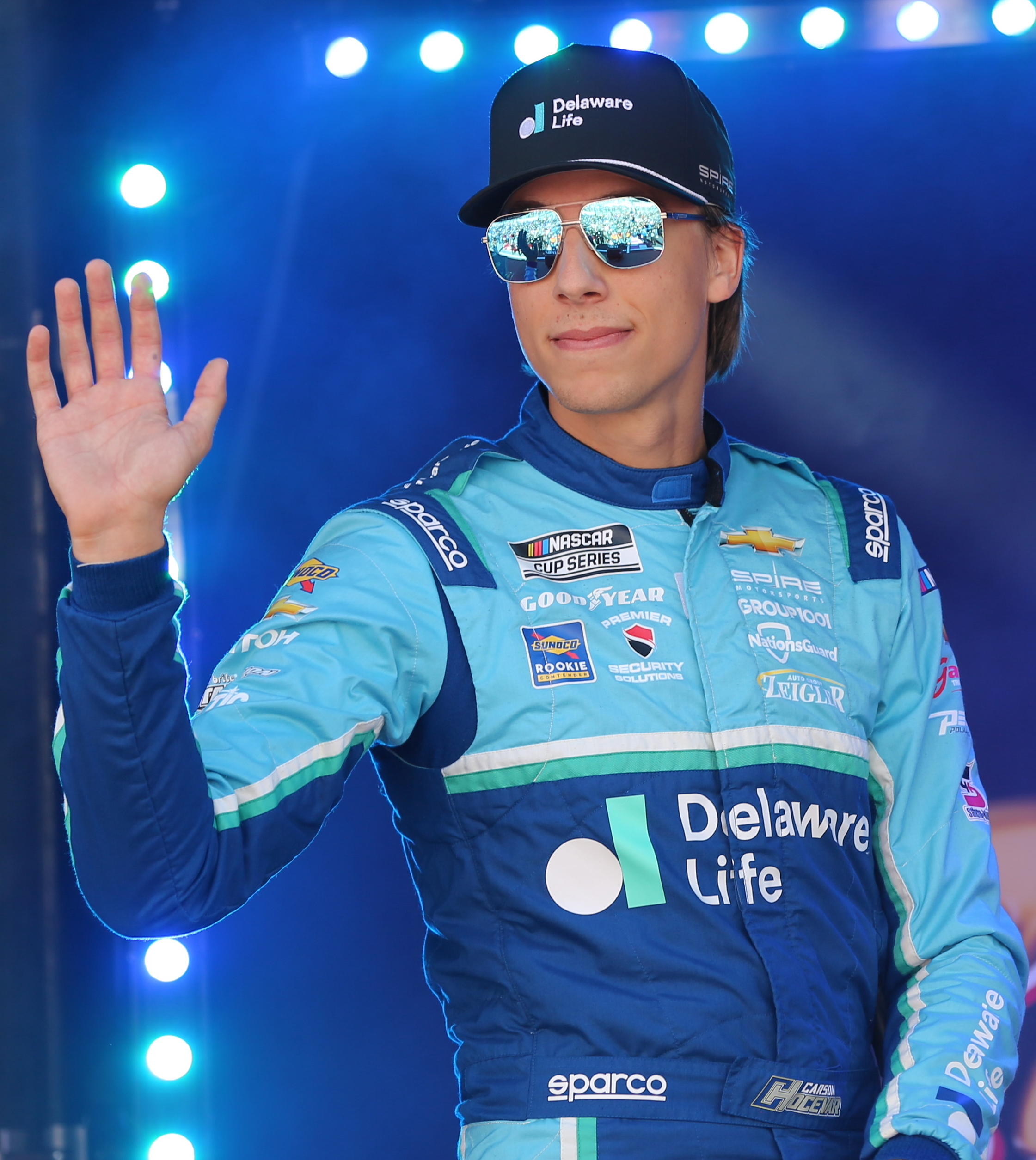
Carson Hocevar, the 2024 NASCAR Rookie of the Year.

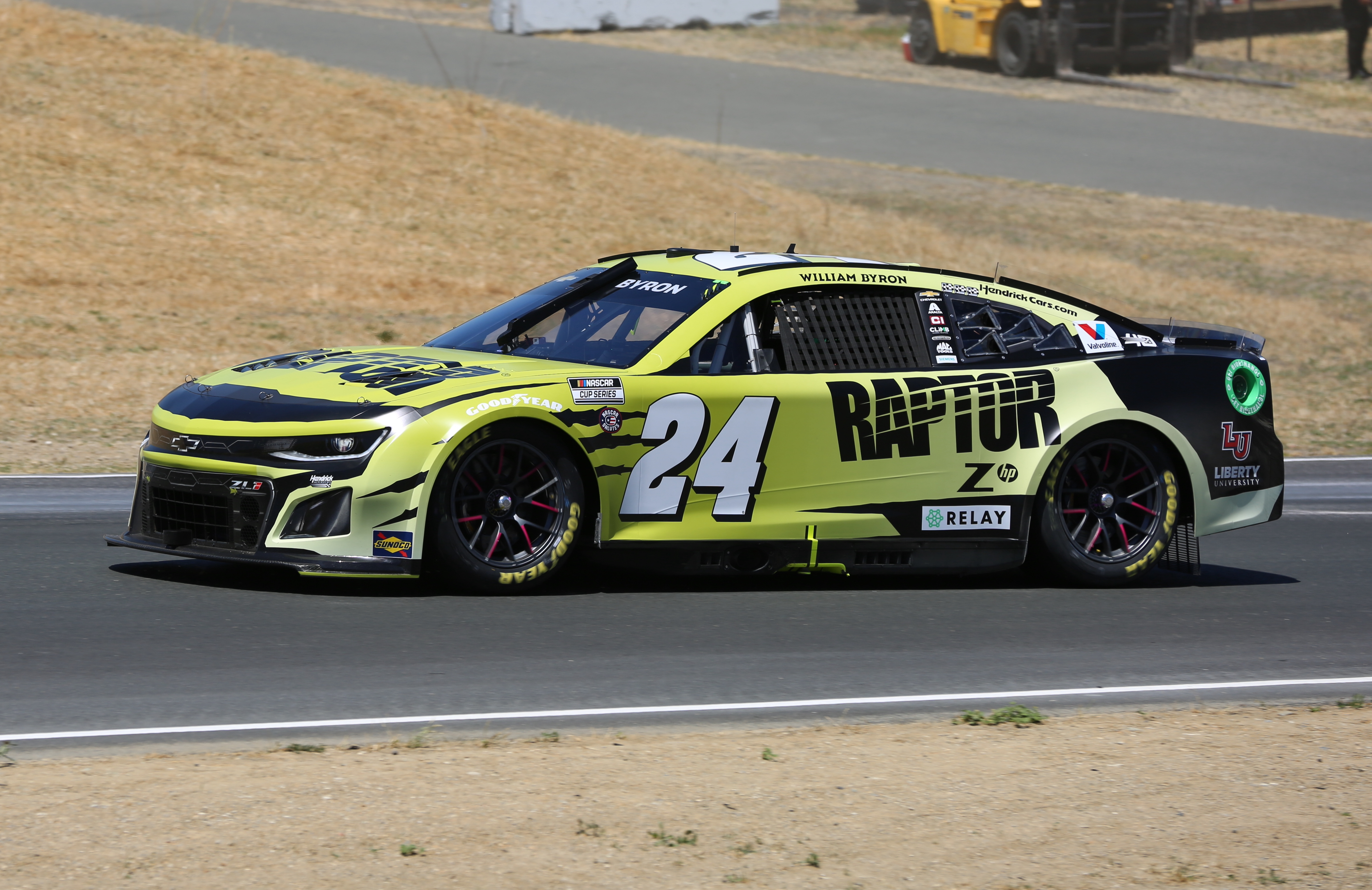
Chevrolet won the manufacturers' championship with 1309 points and 15 wins.

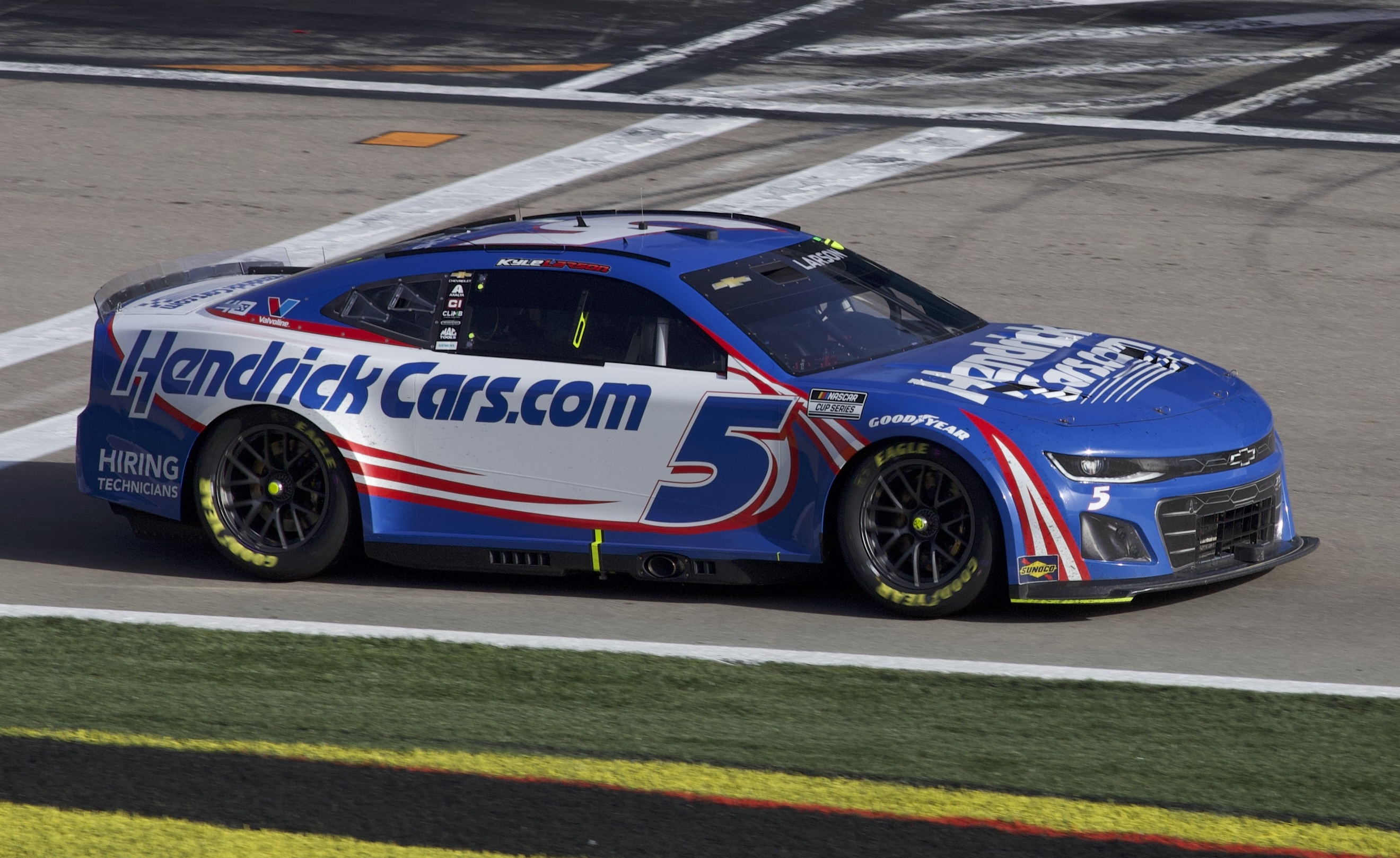
The No. 5 car of Hendrick Motorsports (driven by Kyle Larson for 35 races and Justin Allgaier for one race) won the Owners' Championship Regular Season title, but finished sixth in owner's points.

The 2024 NASCAR Cup Series was the 76th season for NASCAR professional stock car racing in the United States and the 53rd season for the modern-era Cup Series. The pre-season started with the Busch Light Clash on February 3 at the Los Angeles Memorial Coliseum. The Clash would then be followed by the Bluegreen Vacations Duel qualifying races on February 15. The season would then officially kick off with the 66th running of the Daytona 500 (the first points race of the season) on February 19, both at Daytona International Speedway. The season ended with the NASCAR Cup Series Championship Race at Phoenix Raceway on November 10.

This was the first season without 2014 champion Kevin Harvick since 2000, as he retired after the 2023 season and joined the NASCAR on Fox broadcast booth in 2024, and the first season since 2011 without Aric Almirola, who stepped away from racing full-time after the 2023 season. In addition, this was the last season for NASCAR's 2015 TV rights deal, although both Fox Sports and NBC would return for the 2025-31 media deal. This was the last season for Tony Stewart's ownership of Stewart-Haas Racing, as the team announced that they would be shutting down operations at season's end. Gene Haas will fully own the team, with the team being operated by current team president Joe Custer. The team will have one charter and run under the name Haas Factory Team in 2025. This was also the final season for 2017 champion Martin Truex Jr., as he announced his retirement from full-time racing on June 14. In addition, this was the final season for GEICO as a premier partner of the Cup Series. This was also the first winless season of the 2015 and 2019 champion Kyle Busch in his full-time career.

Ryan Blaney of Team Penske entered the season as the defending 2023 NASCAR Cup Series champion. Following the 2024 Cook Out Southern 500 at Darlington Raceway, Tyler Reddick of 23XI Racing clinched the regular season championship. At season's end, Joey Logano won his third championship, becoming the tenth driver in history to win at least three championships; the last to do so was Tony Stewart in 2011.

== Teams and drivers ==
=== Chartered teams ===
Manufacturer	Team	No.	Driver	Crew chief
Chevrolet	Hendrick Motorsports	5	Kyle Larson 35	Cliff Daniels
Chevrolet	Hendrick Motorsports	5	Justin Allgaier 1 (Note: Justin Allgaier ran the Coca-Cola 600 in place of Kyle Larson, who ran the Indianapolis 500 the same day. Larson was originally supposed to get in the car, but the race was called before he officially took over.)	Cliff Daniels
Chevrolet	Hendrick Motorsports	9	Chase Elliott	Alan Gustafson
Chevrolet	Hendrick Motorsports	24	William Byron	Rudy Fugle
Chevrolet	Hendrick Motorsports	48	Alex Bowman	Blake Harris
Chevrolet	JTG Daugherty Racing	47	Ricky Stenhouse Jr.	Mike Kelley
Chevrolet	Kaulig Racing	16	A. J. Allmendinger 12	Travis Mack 31; Andrew Dickeson 4 Darian Grubb 1
Chevrolet	Kaulig Racing	16	Josh Williams 2	Travis Mack 31; Andrew Dickeson 4 Darian Grubb 1
Chevrolet	Kaulig Racing	16	Derek Kraus 6	Travis Mack 31; Andrew Dickeson 4 Darian Grubb 1
Chevrolet	Kaulig Racing	16	Shane van Gisbergen 11	Travis Mack 31; Andrew Dickeson 4 Darian Grubb 1
Chevrolet	Kaulig Racing	16	Ty Dillon 5	Travis Mack 31; Andrew Dickeson 4 Darian Grubb 1
Chevrolet	Kaulig Racing	31	Daniel Hemric	Trent Owens
Chevrolet	Richard Childress Racing	3	Austin Dillon	Keith Rodden 7 Justin Alexander 28 (Note: On April 2, RCR announced that Justin Alexander would replace Rodden as the crew chief of the No. 3 car for the remainder of the 2024 season.); Joel Keller 1
Chevrolet	Richard Childress Racing	8	Kyle Busch	Randall Burnett
Chevrolet	Spire Motorsports	7	Corey LaJoie 29	Ryan Sparks
Chevrolet	Spire Motorsports	7	Justin Haley 7	Ryan Sparks
Chevrolet	Spire Motorsports	71	Zane Smith (R)	Stephen Doran
Chevrolet	Spire Motorsports	77	Carson Hocevar (R)	Luke Lambert
Chevrolet	Trackhouse Racing	1	Ross Chastain	Phil Surgen 35; Darian Grubb 1
Chevrolet	Trackhouse Racing	99	Daniel Suárez	Matt Swiderski
Ford	Front Row Motorsports	34	Michael McDowell	Travis Peterson
Ford	Front Row Motorsports	38	Todd Gilliland	Ryan Bergenty
Ford	RFK Racing	6	Brad Keselowski	Matt McCall
Ford	RFK Racing	17	Chris Buescher	Scott Graves
Ford	Rick Ware Racing	15	Riley Herbst 4	Billy Plourde
Ford	Rick Ware Racing	15	Kaz Grala (R) 23	Billy Plourde
Ford	Rick Ware Racing	15	Cody Ware 9	Billy Plourde
Ford	Rick Ware Racing	51	Justin Haley 29	Chris Lawson
Ford	Rick Ware Racing	51	Corey LaJoie 7	Chris Lawson
Ford	Stewart–Haas Racing	4	Josh Berry (R)	Rodney Childers
Ford	Stewart–Haas Racing	10	Noah Gragson	Drew Blickensderfer
Ford	Stewart–Haas Racing	14	Chase Briscoe	Richard Boswell
Ford	Stewart–Haas Racing	41	Ryan Preece	Chad Johnston
Ford	Team Penske	2	Austin Cindric	Brian Wilson
Ford	Team Penske	12	Ryan Blaney	Jonathan Hassler 35; Tony Palmer 1 (Note: On April 20, Team Penske announced that Palmer would substitute for Hassler as the crew chief of the No. 12 car, as Hassler's wife was expected to give birth soon.)
Ford	Team Penske	22	Joey Logano	Paul Wolfe
Ford	Wood Brothers Racing	21	Harrison Burton	Jeremy Bullins 33; Grant Hutchens 3
Toyota	23XI Racing	23	Bubba Wallace	Bootie Barker 35; Eric Phillips 1
Toyota	23XI Racing	45	Tyler Reddick	Billy Scott
Toyota	Joe Gibbs Racing	11	Denny Hamlin	Chris Gabehart
Toyota	Joe Gibbs Racing	19	Martin Truex Jr.	James Small
Toyota	Joe Gibbs Racing	20	Christopher Bell	Adam Stevens 32; Chris Sherwood 4 (Note: Christopher Bell has car chief Chris Sherwood listed as his crew chief for a few weeks after Adam Stevens suffered a double knee injury during his vacation in late-July 2024.)
Toyota	Joe Gibbs Racing	54	Ty Gibbs	Chris Gayle
Toyota	Legacy Motor Club	42	John Hunter Nemechek	Ben Beshore 31; Brian Campe 5
Toyota	Legacy Motor Club	43	Erik Jones 34	Dave Elenz 30; Joey Cohen 1 (Note: On April 28, Legacy Motor Club announced that Cohen would substitute for Elenz as the crew chief of the No. 43 car, as Elenz had to attend to a personal matter.); Ben Beshore 5
Toyota	Legacy Motor Club	43	Corey Heim 2	Dave Elenz 30; Joey Cohen 1 Ben Beshore 5

=== Non-chartered teams ===
==== Limited schedule ====
Manufacturer	Team	No.	Driver	Crew chief	Races
Chevrolet	Beard Motorsports	62	Anthony Alfredo	Darren Shaw	3
Chevrolet	Beard Motorsports	62	Parker Retzlaff	Darren Shaw	1
Chevrolet	Kaulig Racing	13	A. J. Allmendinger	Eddie Pardue 2 Andrew Dickeson 2 Travis Mack 1	4
Chevrolet	Kaulig Racing	13	Shane van Gisbergen	Eddie Pardue 2 Andrew Dickeson 2 Travis Mack 1	1
Chevrolet	Live Fast Motorsports	78	B. J. McLeod	David Ingram	6
Chevrolet	NY Racing Team	44	J. J. Yeley	Jay Guy 9 Bryan Berry 1	9
Chevrolet	NY Racing Team	44	Joey Gase	Jay Guy 9 Bryan Berry 1	1
Chevrolet	Richard Childress Racing	33	Austin Hill	Keith Rodden	4
Chevrolet	Richard Childress Racing	33	Will Brown	Keith Rodden	1
Chevrolet	Richard Childress Racing	33	Ty Dillon	Keith Rodden	1
Chevrolet	Team AmeriVet	50	Ty Dillon	Darren Shaw 1 Mike Hillman Jr. 1	1
Chevrolet	Team AmeriVet	50	Jeb Burton	Darren Shaw 1 Mike Hillman Jr. 1	1
Ford	Front Row Motorsports	36	Kaz Grala (R)	Seth Barbour	1
Ford	MBM Motorsports	66	Timmy Hill	Carl Long	2
Ford	MBM Motorsports	66	David Starr	Carl Long	1
Ford	MBM Motorsports	66	B. J. McLeod	Carl Long	2
Ford	MBM Motorsports	66	Chad Finchum	Carl Long	3
Ford	MBM Motorsports	66	Josh Bilicki	Carl Long	4
Ford	MBM Motorsports	66	Parker Retzlaff	Carl Long	1
Ford	RFK Racing	60	David Ragan	Derrick Finley	1
Ford	RFK Racing	60	Cameron Waters	Derrick Finley	1
Ford	RFK Racing	60	Joey Hand	Derrick Finley	1
Toyota	23XI Racing	50	Kamui Kobayashi	Julian Pena 2 Dave Rogers 1	1
Toyota	23XI Racing	50	Corey Heim	Julian Pena 2 Dave Rogers 1	1
Toyota	23XI Racing	50	Juan Pablo Montoya	Julian Pena 2 Dave Rogers 1	1
Toyota	Legacy Motor Club	84	Jimmie Johnson	Jason Burdett 6 Gene Wachtel 3	9

=== Notable changes ===
==== Teams ====
- Spire Motorsports purchased Live Fast Motorsports' charter for approximately US$40 million. Spire would field a third full-time team in partnership with Trackhouse Racing, who signed 2022 NASCAR Camping World Truck Series champion Zane Smith. LFM would continue to operate as a part-time open team in 2024.
- Front Row Motorsports switched its technical alliance from RFK Racing to Team Penske.
- In 2023, it was announced that The Money Team Racing would run five to eight races in 2024. They reportedly planned to participate in the 2024 Daytona 500, but did not attempt the race. The team would undergo an ownership change, being renamed to Team AmeriVet, with the Coca-Cola 600 being the first race the team attempted after the changes.

==== Manufacturers ====
- Legacy Motor Club switched from Chevrolet to Toyota.
- Ford Performance switched to the 2024 Ford Mustang Dark Horse for the 2024 season, replacing the sixth generation Mustang.
- Toyota Racing Development switched to the XV80 body style for the Toyota Camry in 2024, replacing the XV70.

== Rule changes ==
- Cup Series cars would run a new aero package at all road courses and tracks measuring one mile or shorter (except Bristol Motor Speedway and Dover Motor Speedway). The package would consist of a three-inch spoiler, a simplified diffuser and diffuser strakes, the 2023-spec short track/road course splitter stuffers, and no engine panel strakes.
- All road/street courses in 2024 would have stage-break cautions.
- Following Corey LaJoie's flip at Michigan, NASCAR mandated a Right Side Rear Window Air Deflector to be used the following week during Daytona.

== Schedule ==
The 2024 schedule was released on October 4, 2023 and consists of 31 oval races, 4 road course races, one street track race, and 4 non-championship races to be held on ovals.

Bolded races indicate an event generally known as a Crown Jewel race.

O Oval track
R Road course
S Street course

No	Race name	Track	Location	Date	Time (ET)	TV	Radio
Regular Season
	Busch Light Clash at The Coliseum	O Los Angeles Memorial Coliseum	Los Angeles, California	February 3 (Note: Busch Light Clash at The Coliseum was brought forward from Sunday, February 4 to Saturday, February 3 due to anticipated severe weather. Television broadcasting of the race was switched from Fox to FS1 due to this rescheduling.)	8pm	FS1	MRN
	Bluegreen Vacations Duel	O Daytona International Speedway	Daytona Beach, Florida	February 15	7pm	FS1	MRN
1	**Daytona 500**	O Daytona International Speedway	Daytona Beach, Florida	February 19 (Note: The Daytona 500 was postponed from Sunday, February 18 to Monday, February 19 due to rain.)	4pm	Fox	MRN
2	Ambetter Health 400	O Atlanta Motor Speedway	Hampton, Georgia	February 25	3pm	Fox	PRN
3	Pennzoil 400	O Las Vegas Motor Speedway	Las Vegas, Nevada	March 3	3:30pm	Fox	PRN
4	Shriners Children's 500	O Phoenix Raceway	Avondale, Arizona	March 10	3:30pm	Fox	MRN
5	Food City 500	O Bristol Motor Speedway	Bristol, Tennessee	March 17	3:30pm	Fox	PRN
6	EchoPark Automotive Grand Prix	R Circuit of the Americas	Austin, Texas	March 24	3:30pm	Fox	PRN
7	Toyota Owners 400	O Richmond Raceway	Richmond, Virginia	March 31	7pm	Fox	MRN
8	Cook Out 400	O Martinsville Speedway	Ridgeway, Virginia	April 7	3pm	FS1	MRN
9	Autotrader EchoPark Automotive 400	O Texas Motor Speedway	Fort Worth, Texas	April 14	3:30pm	FS1	PRN
10	GEICO 500	O Talladega Superspeedway	Lincoln, Alabama	April 21	3pm	Fox	MRN
11	Würth 400	O Dover Motor Speedway	Dover, Delaware	April 28	2pm	FS1	PRN
12	AdventHealth 400	O Kansas Speedway	Kansas City, Kansas	May 5	3pm	FS1	MRN
13	Goodyear 400	O Darlington Raceway	Darlington, South Carolina	May 12	3pm	FS1	MRN
	NASCAR All Star Open	O North Wilkesboro Speedway	North Wilkesboro, North Carolina	May 19	6pm	FS1	MRN
	NASCAR All-Star Race	O North Wilkesboro Speedway	North Wilkesboro, North Carolina	May 19	8:30pm	FS1	MRN
14	**Coca-Cola 600**	O Charlotte Motor Speedway	Concord, North Carolina	May 26	6pm	Fox	PRN
15	Enjoy Illinois 300	O World Wide Technology Raceway	Madison, Illinois	June 2	3:30pm	FS1	MRN
16	Toyota/Save Mart 350	R Sonoma Raceway	Sonoma, California	June 9	3:30pm	Fox	PRN
17	Iowa Corn 350	O Iowa Speedway	Newton, Iowa	June 16	7pm	USA	MRN
18	USA Today 301	O New Hampshire Motor Speedway	Loudon, New Hampshire	June 23	2:30pm	USA	PRN
19	Ally 400	O Nashville Superspeedway	Lebanon, Tennessee	June 30	3:30pm	NBC	PRN
20	Grant Park 165	S Chicago Street Course	Chicago, Illinois	July 7	4:30pm	NBC	MRN
21	The Great American Getaway 400	O Pocono Raceway	Long Pond, Pennsylvania	July 14	2:30pm	USA	MRN
22	**Brickyard 400**	O Indianapolis Motor Speedway	Speedway, Indiana	July 21	2:30pm	NBC	IMS
23	Cook Out 400	O Richmond Raceway	Richmond, Virginia	August 11	6:30pm	USA	MRN
24	FireKeepers Casino 400	O Michigan International Speedway	Brooklyn, Michigan	August 18–19 (Note: The FireKeepers Casino 400 started on Sunday, August 18 but was postponed to Monday, August 19 due to rain.)	11am	USA	MRN
25	Coke Zero Sugar 400	O Daytona International Speedway	Daytona Beach, Florida	August 24	7:30pm	NBC	MRN
26	**Cook Out Southern 500**	O Darlington Raceway	Darlington, South Carolina	September 1	6pm	USA	MRN
NASCAR Cup Series Playoffs
Round of 16
27	Quaker State 400	O Atlanta Motor Speedway	Hampton, Georgia	September 8	3pm	USA	PRN
28	Go Bowling at The Glen	R Watkins Glen International	Watkins Glen, New York	September 15	3pm	USA	MRN
29	Bass Pro Shops Night Race	O Bristol Motor Speedway	Bristol, Tennessee	September 21	7:30pm	USA	PRN
Round of 12
30	Hollywood Casino 400	O Kansas Speedway	Kansas City, Kansas	September 29	3pm	USA	MRN
31	YellaWood 500	O Talladega Superspeedway	Lincoln, Alabama	October 6	2pm	NBC	MRN
32	Bank of America Roval 400	R Charlotte Motor Speedway (Roval)	Concord, North Carolina	October 13	2pm	NBC	PRN
Round of 8
33	South Point 400	O Las Vegas Motor Speedway	Las Vegas, Nevada	October 20	2:30pm	NBC	PRN
34	Straight Talk Wireless 400	O Homestead–Miami Speedway	Homestead, Florida	October 27	2:30pm	NBC	MRN
35	Xfinity 500	O Martinsville Speedway	Ridgeway, Virginia	November 3	2pm	NBC	MRN
Championship 4
36	NASCAR Cup Series Championship Race	O Phoenix Raceway	Avondale, Arizona	November 10	3pm	NBC	MRN

=== Confirmed schedule changes ===
- Auto Club Speedway was not featured on the schedule for the first time since 2021.
- Bristol Motor Speedway brought back the concete spring race would return, having taken place on dirt the prior three seasons. In the same press release
- Indianapolis Motor Speedway announced that the Cup Series would return to the oval layout in 2024, in time to commemorate the 30th anniversary of the Brickyard 400.
- Iowa Speedway was added to the schedule following the removal of Auto Club.
- The Cup Series took a two-week hiatus between the Brickyard 400 and the Cook Out 400, as NBC covered the 2024 Summer Olympics.

== Season summary ==
=== Regular season ===
Exhibition: Busch Light Clash at The Coliseum

The Busch Clash was moved from Sunday, February 4 to Saturday, February 3 in advance of the February 2024 California atmospheric rivers. This resulted in the cancellation of scheduled heat races, as the event was condensed into a one-day practice, qualifying, and race event. Denny Hamlin took the pole for the 23-car field, with notable drivers such as Daniel Suárez, Austin Dillon, Austin Cindric, and Christopher Bell failing to qualify for the 150-lap event. Hamlin led most of the first 50 laps before yielding the lead to Ty Gibbs on lap 50. Gibbs led 84 of the next 91 laps, as Justin Haley, Chase Elliott, and Todd Gilliland all failed to finish due to mechanical issues. Hamlin reclaimed the lead on a restart with ten laps remaining as Gibbs fell back through the field. Gibbs spun with two laps remaining, ultimately finishing 18th. Hamlin held off on the final restart to win.

Daytona Speedweeks

In Daytona 500 qualifying, Joey Logano of Team Penske won the pole and was joined on the front row by Michael McDowell of Front Row Motorsports.

In the Bluegreen Vacation Duels, Logano started on the pole for Duel 1 while McDowell started on the pole for Duel 2. Tyler Reddick won the first duel while Christopher Bell won the second duel.

Round 1: Daytona 500

The Daytona 500 was moved from Sunday to Monday due to rain. On lap 6, John Hunter Nemechek bumped into Harrison Burton, causing a collision involving Carson Hocevar, Kaz Grala, Austin Dillon, Ryan Preece, and Jimmie Johnson in the tri-oval. From the ensuing restart until lap 191, the race was incident-free, with Chase Elliott winning the first stage and Ryan Blaney winning the second stage. On lap 191, as the field entered turn 3, William Byron turned Brad Keselowski into the wall, collecting Blaney, Logano, Elliott, Denny Hamlin, Chris Buescher, Daniel Hemric, Todd Gilliland, Tyler Reddick, and others, resulting in a red flag. At the white flag, Ross Chastain was turned when Corey LaJoie made contact with Austin Cindric, bringing out the caution. Byron was ahead of teammate Alex Bowman when the caution came out and was awarded the victory. This is the 9th Daytona 500 win for Hendrick Motorsports, tying them with Petty Enterprises for the most all-time.

Round 2: Ambetter Health 400

Michael McDowell started on the pole. On Lap 2, Austin Dillon was turned and collected Christopher Bell, Alex Bowman, Noah Gragson, Josh Williams, Harrison Burton, Daniel Hemric, John Hunter Nemechek, and others. McDowell won the first stage, and Austin Cindric won the second stage as Joey Logano hit the wall along with Chris Buescher and Denny Hamlin. Todd Gilliland impressed with a good performance and led the most laps. Chase Elliott spun after contact with Ross Chastain. Brad Keselowski hit the wall along with Kyle Larson and Corey LaJoie. Chase Briscoe slammed into the wall with Hamlin, which brought out the red flag. On the restart, Josh Berry hit the wall with Elliott and Carson Hocevar. Coming to the finish line, Daniel Suárez edged Ryan Blaney and Kyle Busch in a three-wide finish for the fourth closest finish in NASCAR history and for his second career win.

Round 3: Pennzoil 400

Joey Logano started on the pole. Christopher Bell and Chris Buescher both hit the wall after a flat tire, with Buescher exiting the race due to the wheel coming off his car. Kyle Larson dominated the race by leading the most laps. Larson also won both stages and secured the victory by holding off a charging Tyler Reddick.

Round 4: Shriners Children's 500

Denny Hamlin won the pole. Austin Cindric sustained heavy damage after contact with Austin Dillon. Tyler Reddick won the first stage, while Christopher Bell won the second stage. Kyle Busch and Hamlin both spun in separate incidents. Joey Logano spun after contact with John Hunter Nemechek and collected Corey LaJoie and Derek Kraus. Martin Truex Jr. attempted pit strategy by pitting early in anticipation of a fuel mileage race, but the leaders had enough fuel to finish, and Bell held off Chris Buescher for the win.

Round 5: Food City 500

Ryan Blaney won the pole. The race was plagued by extreme tire wear. Ty Gibbs dominated the first half of the race and won both stages. The race saw 54 lead changes, the most for a short-track race in Cup Series history. Kyle Busch spun twice with a flat tire. Gibbs was heading to the win until the lapped car of Todd Gilliland slowed down and caused Gibbs and teammate Christopher Bell to lose multiple spots. Denny Hamlin dominated the second half of the race and led the most laps. Hamlin and teammate Martin Truex Jr. stayed out front after the final round of green-flag pit stops and saved their tires. Hamlin was able to hold off Truex for the win, followed by Brad Keselowski, Alex Bowman, and Kyle Larson, marking the first time since the 2004 MBNA America 400 at Dover that a race ended with 5 or fewer cars on the lead lap.

Round 6: EchoPark Automotive Grand Prix

William Byron won the pole. On lap 1, Corey LaJoie made contact with Bubba Wallace and Martin Truex Jr. Christopher Bell won Stage 1. Ricky Stenhouse Jr. and Kamui Kobayashi, in his 2nd career Cup Series start, spun after Stenhouse ran into him. Denny Hamlin won Stage 2. In the final stage, Bell made a bold move into turn 1, spinning Kyle Busch. Towards the end of the race, it seemed to be a battle between Byron, Alex Bowman, and Ty Gibbs. However, Bell, with fresher tires, charged through the field but ultimately fell one lap short, allowing Byron to secure the victory.

Round 7: Toyota Owners 400

Kyle Larson won the pole. The race started on weather tires due to the track still being wet from rain. Larson won the first stage while Martin Truex Jr. won the second stage. Kyle Busch got into the wall after a flat tire. Truex was heading to the win until Larson spun after contact with Bubba Wallace, bringing out the caution and sending the race into overtime. Denny Hamlin won the race off pit road and held off Joey Logano and Truex for his second win of the season.

Round 8: Cook Out 400

Kyle Larson won the pole for the second straight race. Larson dominated early and won the first stage. Christopher Bell got a flat tire, bringing the caution out for debris. Joey Logano took two tires and held on to the lead, but started falling back as Denny Hamlin won the second stage. Hamlin and Chase Elliott took turns leading the race, but William Byron pitted a lap before everyone else on the final round of green flag pit stops. John Hunter Nemechek blew a tire and caught fire, sending the race to overtime. On the restart, Byron held the lead and scored his third win of the season.

Round 9: Autotrader EchoPark Automotive 400

Kyle Larson won the pole for the third straight race. Larson won the first stage while Ross Chastain won the second stage. Christopher Bell spun into the wall, causing Alex Bowman to spin after contact with John Hunter Nemechek. Michael McDowell spun into the wall while battling Chastain for the lead. On a restart, Harrison Burton made a three wide pass for the lead on Bubba Wallace and Chase Briscoe, which sent the latter two spinning after contact with one another. Ryan Blaney spun into the wall. On a restart, Larson spun which sent the race to overtime. On the first attempt, Denny Hamlin spun while battling Chase Elliott for the lead. On the second attempt, Burton and Kaz Grala spun after contact. On the restart, Chastain got into the wall after contact with William Byron on the final lap as Elliott won under caution for his first win in 42 races.

Round 10: GEICO 500

Michael McDowell started on pole for the second time in his career. Austin Cindric narrowly beat Chase Elliott by inches to win Stage 1, while Joey Logano won Stage 2. The race was incident-free until lap 132 when Christopher Bell crashed out on the backstretch, collecting Justin Haley, Chase Briscoe, and Zane Smith. On lap 151, the Toyota drivers were drafting alone as part of a pit strategy when Erik Jones lost control and hit the outside wall head-on in turn 3, collecting Bubba Wallace, John Hunter Nemechek, and Denny Hamlin, which claimed four of the six Toyotas in the draft. McDowell held onto the lead in the closing laps of the race until the last lap when Brad Keselowski attempted a crossover move from second. McDowell got loose while blocking and wrecked on the tri-oval, triggering "The Big One", which caused Corey LaJoie to flip upside-down. Tyler Reddick evaded the wreck and made a three-wide pass on Keselowski and Noah Gragson to score the win.

Round 11: Würth 400

Kyle Busch won the pole. Brad Keselowski spun after a flat tire as Martin Truex Jr. won the first stage under caution and Kyle Larson won the second stage. Ricky Stenhouse Jr. got into the wall after contact with Josh Berry. On the restart, Bubba Wallace got into the wall after contact with Zane Smith and collected Christopher Bell and William Byron. Denny Hamlin led the most laps and held off a charging Larson for his third win of the season.

Round 12: AdventHealth 400

Christopher Bell won the pole. The race was delayed for several hours due to rain. The first two stages ran caution free with Denny Hamlin winning the first stage and Chris Buescher winning the second stage. Austin Cindric got into the wall after contact with Hamlin and collected Bubba Wallace. Jimmie Johnson got into the wall after contact with Corey LaJoie. Joey Logano spun and got stuck in the grass. Fuel mileage came into play late as the leaders slowed down to make it to the end, but a caution came out for a spin by Kyle Busch, which sent the race into overtime and sent the leaders down pit road. On the restart, Buescher took the lead but Kyle Larson edged Buescher at the line at .001, the closest finish in NASCAR Cup Series history which the record was held by the finish of the 2003 Carolina Dodge Dealers 400 by Ricky Craven and Kurt Busch, a record that stood for 21 years.

Round 13: Goodyear 400

Tyler Reddick won the pole. Kyle Larson won the first stage while Reddick won the second stage. John Hunter Nemechek spun after two flat tires. On a restart, Ryan Blaney got into the wall after William Byron made contact with Martin Truex Jr. Late in the race, Reddick and Brad Keselowski made contact battling for the lead allowing Chris Buescher to make a three-wide pass for the lead. With 10 laps to go, Buescher and Reddick made contact battling for the lead causing both flat tires on both cars taking both to pit road as Keselowski retook the lead and held off Ty Gibbs and Josh Berry for the win, his first win as an owner/driver (the first since Tony Stewart in 2016), the first win of 2024 for Ford, and snapped a 110-race winless streak, the longest drought of his career.

Exhibition: NASCAR All-Star Race

In The Open, Ty Gibbs started on pole for the 2nd straight time. In the end, Gibbs led all 100 laps and won the Open and advanced to the All-Star Race with runner-up Bubba Wallace and Noah Gragson, who won the fan vote for the second year in a row.

In the All-Star Race, Joey Logano started on pole. Kyle Busch and Ricky Stenhouse Jr. made contact on Lap 2 and Busch spun Stenhouse into the wall, taking Stenhouse out of the race and Stenhouse left his damaged car in Busch's pit box. Logano dominated by leading all but one lap and held off Denny Hamlin to win the $1 million for his second All-Star Race win. Busch and Stenhouse got into a brawl by the haulers and the melee caused crew member suspensions and Stenhouse was fined $75,000 for striking Busch.

Round 14: Coca-Cola 600

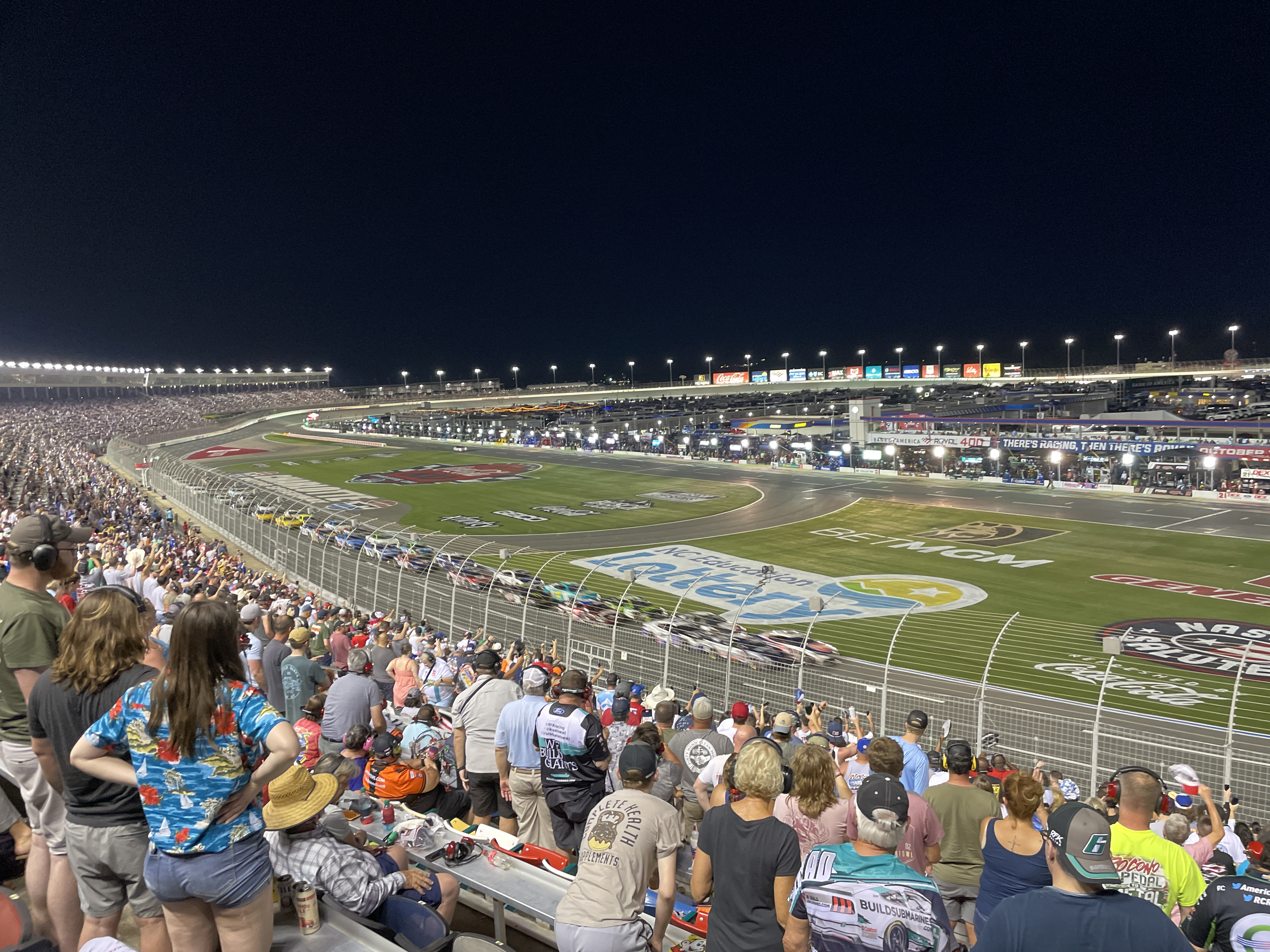
Eventual race winner Christopher Bell leads during the third stage at the Coca-Cola 600 at Charlotte Motor Speedway in May

Ty Gibbs won the pole. William Byron took the first stage and Christopher Bell won the second stage. Noah Gragson spun and slammed into the wall after contact with Ricky Stenhouse Jr. Justin Allgaier, filling in for Kyle Larson who was running the Indianapolis 500, got up to 13th position when a caution came out. Larson arrived in Charlotte during the caution, but was unable to race as the race was red flagged due to rain and lightning and race was called after 249 laps as NASCAR tried to dry the track for over an hour but was not making enough progress to get the race restarted at a reasonable hour, so Bell was given his second win of the season.

Round 15: Enjoy Illinois 300

Michael McDowell started on the pole. Christopher Bell swept the stages. Josh Berry slammed into the wall after his left front tire became flat. Kyle Busch and Kyle Larson got into the wall after making contact taking Busch, the defending race winner, out of the race, this being the first of his 5 DNFS of the season. Ryan Blaney and Christopher Bell battled for the lead until Bell began having engine issues and fell back. Blaney would run out of fuel at the white flag and his teammate Austin Cindric took the lead and won the race, his second career win and breaking an 85-race winless streak, dating back to the 2022 Daytona 500.

Round 16: Toyota/Save Mart 350

Joey Logano won the pole. On Lap 2, Denny Hamlin blew an engine, putting oil on the track. Ty Gibbs got into the wall after a flat tire. Chase Briscoe spun, collecting Logano and Harrison Burton. Tyler Reddick won the first stage while Chris Buescher won the second stage. Austin Cindric spun up the hill, almost flipping over. Josh Berry got into the wall and collected Christopher Bell, William Byron, and Austin Dillon. After the final round of green flag pit stops, Buescher got back to the lead. With 10 laps to go, Martin Truex Jr. took the lead from Buescher and then Kyle Larson took the lead from Truex and pulled away. On the final lap, Kyle Busch spun after contact with Ross Chastain and Truex ran out of fuel while Larson won the race, his third win of the season and second at Sonoma.

Round 17: Iowa Corn 350

This was the first ever NASCAR Cup Series race at Iowa Speedway. Kyle Larson scored his 4th pole of the season. The race saw multiple tire issues. On lap 51, A. J. Allmendinger got a flat tire and got an early exit. Ryan Blaney won the first stage and Larson won the second stage. On lap 220, Larson got into a wreck with Daniel Suárez sending Larson to the garage and later returned multiple laps down. Kyle Busch experienced mechanical issues leading to him being out of the race. Blaney, on two tires, held off a charging William Byron to win the race.

Round 18: USA Today 301

Chase Elliott won the pole after qualifying was cancelled due to inclement weather, ending a 39-race streak of having qualifying. Alex Bowman was the first out due to a terminal issue. Christopher Bell won the first stage and Denny Hamlin won the second stage. On a restart, Joey Logano locked up the brakes and got into Elliott, spinning him out. The race was put under a red flag due to weather. NASCAR officials instructed teams to prepare their cars with wet-weather tires. The race resumed and Kyle Busch got into the wall under caution, taking him out of the race. Ross Chastain and Justin Haley went into contact and the race went under caution. On the restart, Michael McDowell spun and collected Ryan Blaney. After Brad Keselowski got into a wreck, the race went to overtime. Bell held on for his third win of the season, sweeping the weekend due to his Xfinity win the day before.

Round 19: Ally 400

Denny Hamlin won the pole. Christopher Bell swept the stages for the fourth time in his career and second of the season. At lap 132, Chad Finchum was the first one out of the race while Ty Gibbs spun after contact with Alex Bowman. The race was red flagged on lap 137 for a weather delay in the Nashville area. After over an hour and a half, the race resumed. Bell spun and got into the wall, ending his dominant day. Brad Keselowski spun into the wall and Chase Elliott spun in the grass, which shook up pit strategy. Carson Hocevar spun Harrison Burton under caution. Ryan Blaney stayed off pit road and stayed out front, but eventually had to pit. Hamlin passed Ross Chastain for the lead and was heading to the win until Austin Cindric spun, sending the race to overtime. The leaders were all close on fuel with most not having enough to make it. On the restart, Chastain spun into the wall after contact with Kyle Larson and collected Austin Dillon. On the second restart, Justin Haley spun and collected Blaney, Burton, Josh Berry, Corey Heim, and Todd Gilliland. On the third restart, Larson ran out of fuel and stacked up his line, taking out Kyle Busch. Hamlin and Martin Truex Jr. pitted for fuel. On the fourth restart, Berry got into the wall while Elliott ran out of fuel. On the fifth restart, Joey Logano had enough fuel to hold off Zane Smith and Tyler Reddick for the win.

Round 20: Grant Park 165

Kyle Larson won the pole for the fifth time this year. After the pre-race ceremonys, light rain came down. NASCAR designated the track as wet and teams have the option to put on the wet tires. Drivers then put on slick tires before the green flag. On the green flag, Ty Gibbs passed Larson for the lead. Shane van Gisbergen won the first stage and Joey Hand won the second stage, their first career Cup stage wins. On lap 26, Chase Briscoe sent van Gisbergen into the outside wall sending the defending race winner out. The race was red flagged on the same lap for a weather delay in the Chicago area. Before the race resumed, NASCAR told officials that they’d be put under a time limit to 8:20pm CT. After about an hour, the race resumed and Larson got into the tire barrier and the race went under caution, taking him out of the race at lap 34. Shortly after, on lap 38, Josh Berry crashed into the tire barrier, but no caution. Hand and others kept on wet tires while others put on slicks. Alex Bowman took the lead from Hand and the caution went out for Berry who went into the tire barriers at turn 2. On lap 55, John Hunter Nemechek into the wall in turn 12, but no caution. Later Christopher Bell, Carson Hocevar, and Martin Truex Jr. got together but continued. The time expired and the race was shortened to 58 laps. Tyler Reddick, on slicks tires, closed on Bowman for the lead, but Reddick got into the wall and Bowman pulled away to win, locking himself into the playoffs and snapped an 80-race winless streak, the first since the 2022 Pennzoil 400, the longest drought of his career.

Round 21: The Great American Getaway 400

Ty Gibbs won the pole. Kyle Busch had to start at the rear due to unapproved adjustments on an oil-line leak before the race. The caution went out early for a crash by Noah Gragson in turn 1, ending his day. Martin Truex Jr. won the first stage and Denny Hamlin won the second stage. Ross Chastain got into the wall in turn 3, but kept going and then got back into the turn 1 wall, sending him out. Todd Gilliland had a brake rotor failure and got into the wall. At lap 121, Busch spun after contact with Corey LaJoie and collected Ryan Preece, Harrison Burton, A. J. Allmendinger, and Ricky Stenhouse Jr. Zane Smith and John Hunter Nemechek both got in the wall. On lap 133, Gibbs blew the engine and put oil on the track. Ryan Blaney held Hamlin and Alex Bowman for his second win of the season.

Round 22: Brickyard 400

This race was the 30th anniversary of the Inaugural Brickyard 400. Tyler Reddick won the pole. Reddick led the first 36 laps but was passed by Denny Hamlin for the lead. Martin Truex Jr. had to serve a pass-through for a tech violation at qualifying. B. J. McLeod was the first out. Brad Keselowski and Chase Elliott served a pass-through for blend-line violation. Hamlin won the first stage and Bubba Wallace won the second stage. On the restart, John Hunter Nemechek took the lead from Hamlin. Cody Ware's left rear tire went down after contact with the wall. On lap 74, A. J. Allmendinger and William Byron wrecked on the backstretch. On the restart, Truex Jr. and Josh Berry spun and has contact with the wall. Jimmie Johnson and Joey Logano wrecked on a restart, sending them out. On lap 157, Kyle Busch wrecked into the wall, sending race into an overtime finish. On the first restart, the leader, Keselowski pitted, them Busch, Nemechek, Hamlin, Alex Bowman, and Daniel Hemric, wrecked of the pit wall, sending them all out, and putting the red flag out. On the second restart, Ryan Preece spun out, still green. But in the end, Kyle Larson ended up winning his 3rd crown jewel race of his career.

Round 23: Cook Out 400

Denny Hamlin won the pole. Teams have both Prime (yellow) and Option (red) tire setups. They ran this Option setup at All-Star Race. Christopher Bell won the first stage and Daniel Suárez won the second stage. On the restart, Suárez started 16th, but on lap 94, with the option tire on, Suárez took the lead from Hamlin. On lap 250, Martin Truex Jr. had engine issues, sending him out for the night. But towards the end of the race Austin Dillon, overcame Joey Logano Hamlin, and Suárez but with 2 laps to go, Ricky Stenhouse Jr. got into Ryan Preece and the race went into overtime, but he won the race on pit road for his first win of the season and his first since the 2022 Coke Zero Sugar 400 at Daytona and Richard Childress Racings first win since Kyle Busch's win at Gateway.

Round 24: FireKeepers Casino 400

Denny Hamlin won the pole as qualifying was cancelled due to rain. On lap 38, Hamlin spun into the wall and slid into the grass. Ryan Blaney won the first stage as right after, race came and delayed the race to Monday, after 51 laps were complete. Stage two ended with Kyle Busch winning his first stage of the year after Kyle Larson, Todd Gilliland, Christopher Bell, and Joey Logano were taken out in an incident that also involved Chris Buescher and Bubba Wallace. On lap 136, Corey LaJoie flipped and slid upside down, sending him out of the race. The race went into overtime after an incident with Martin Truex Jr. On the first overtime, Alex Bowman hit the wall and the top line had to check up causing Ross Chastain to spin around. On the second attempt, Tyler Reddick held off William Byron for his second win of the season.

Round 25: Coke Zero Sugar 400

Michael McDowell won the pole. Josh Berry won the first stage, his first career stage win, and Joey Logano won the second stage. When Denny Hamlin was trying to leave his pit stop at lap 38, Daniel Suárez had to move up for him to exit but when he did, Hamlin ran over fluid that lead to Suárez's car catching on fire, sending him out for the day. On lap 60, the caution went out for a large crash involving Martin Truex Jr., Noah Gragson, Alex Bowman, Ross Chastain, Ty Gibbs, Corey LaJoie, Hamlin, Kyle Larson, Ryan Preece, Chase Elliott, John Hunter Nemechek, and Austin Dillon. On lap 81, Erik Jones and Shane van Gisbergen suddenly had a problem at the same time. van Gisbergen blew a motor and Jones had a flat tire. Brad Keselowski had to serve a pass-through restart violation. With 9 laps to go, McDowell, Logano, Larson, Bubba Wallace, and Tyler Reddick were all involved in a wreck, with McDowell nearly flipping in front of the pack. With 2 laps to go, Berry did flip and hit the wall hard while upside down, sending the race into an overtime finish. Shortly after that happened, the race was red flagged. On the first overtime, Harrison Burton would pass Busch for his first career win and Wood Brothers Racing's 100th career win.

Round 26: Cook Out Southern 500

Bubba Wallace scored the pole. On lap 3, Martin Truex Jr. got into Ryan Blaney, sending them out first. Kyle Larson swept the stages for the second time of the season. On lap 344, Josh Berry, Wallace, Ty Gibbs, William Byron, Noah Gragson, Austin Dillon, Tyler Reddick and Daniel Suárez were involved. But in the end, Chase Briscoe won the race after holding off a charging Kyle Busch to lock himself into the playoffs with Truex Jr. after stage two.

=== Playoffs ===
Round 27: Quaker State 400

Michael McDowell won the pole. On lap 55, Kyle Larson got loose and hit the wall outside of turn 2, sending him and Chase Briscoe out, Ryan Blaney won stage 1 as a result of the caution and Austin Cindric won stage 2. Joey Logano eventually managed to pull away from a speedy Daniel Suárez and Ryan Blaney to advance to the Round of 12 and get his second win of the season.

Round 28: Go Bowling at The Glen

Ross Chastain won the pole. On the first lap on the bus stop, Ryan Blaney spun and was taken out early. Chastain dominated most of the race. Martin Truex Jr. won the first stage and Chastain won the second stage. William Byron slightly went airborne and took the race into overtime. Shane van Gisbergen led the field with half a lap to go on the last lap when Chris Buescher took the lead, ultimately winning the race and getting his first since the 2023 Daytona Night Race.

Round 29: Bass Pro Shops Night Race

Alex Bowman won the pole. Kyle Larson ended up dominating the race, sweeping the stages. Larson would end up racing to the win. The drivers eliminated from the Round of 16 were Harrison Burton, Ty Gibbs, Brad Keselowski, and Martin Truex Jr..

Round 30: Hollywood Casino 400

Christopher Bell won the pole. Josh Berry hit the inside wall on lap 1, ending his day early. Hendrick Motorsports swept the stages, with William Byron winning stage 1 and Alex Bowman winning stage 2. Ross Chastain ended up winning the race.

Round 31: YellaWood 500

Michael McDowell won the pole for the 6th time this season. Chris Buescher won the first stage and Austin Cindric won the second stage. On Lap 185, "The Big One" struck Talladega, as 28 drivers got collected, the biggest in NASCAR history, Ricky Stenhouse Jr. won the race, beating out Brad Keselowski by .006 seconds for the 12th closest finish in NASCAR history.

Round 32: Bank of America Roval 400

Shane van Gisbergen won the pole, giving both him and Kaulig Racing their first career Cup Series pole. Tyler Reddick won the first stage and Alex Bowman won the second stage. Chase Briscoe had an issue sending him out of the race, ending his playoff hopes. Kyle Larson ended up dominating the race, leading most of the lap and racing to the win. The initial drivers eliminated from the Round of 12 were Briscoe, Daniel Suárez, Austin Cindric, and Joey Logano. However, Alex Bowman was stripped of his eighteenth-place finish after failing a post-race inspection, and lost his spot in the Round of 8 to Logano.

Round 33: South Point 400

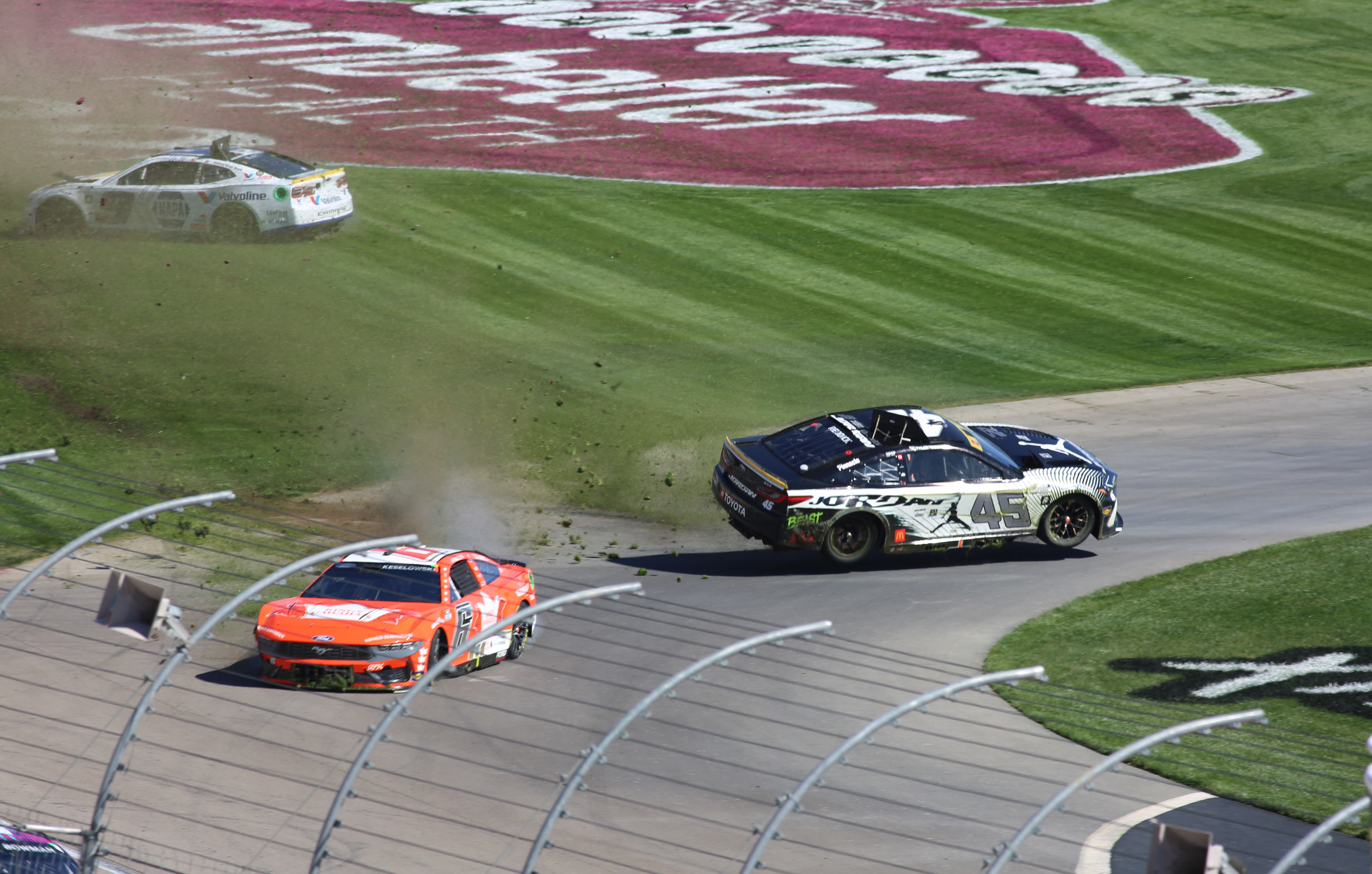
The crash between Chase Elliott, Brad Keselowski and Tyler Reddick which send Reddick into a flip.

Christopher Bell won the pole. Tyler Reddick won the first stage and Bell won the second stage. On lap 89, Reddick, Brad Keselowski and Chase Elliott were involved in a wreck, sending Reddick and Keselowski out. Bell would dominate, leading 155 laps but in the end, Joey Logano would hold off Bell to lock himself in the Championship 4.

Round 34: Straight Talk Wireless 400

Tyler Reddick won the pole. Reddick won his third consecutive stage one and Denny Hamlin picked up stage two, his first stage win since Indianapolis. On the last lap, Ryan Blaney was passed by Reddick. Reddick ended up winning the race, and clinched an opportunity to give him his first Championship 4 appearance, joining Joey Logano.

Round 35: Xfinity 500

Martin Truex Jr. won the pole. Chase Elliott won stage one and Brad Keselowski won stage two, his first stage win of the year. The ending to the race was shrouded in controversy, as Christopher Bell attempted to do a wall ride move, similar to Ross Chastain's move in 2022's running, in which such move is prohibited. There was speculation of race manipulation as Chastain and Austin Dillon created a blockade behind Byron in closing laps in the race to prevent him from losing a spot that would have eliminated him from the playoffs, and Bubba Wallace intentionally slowing down on the final lap to allow Bell to gain a position to tie with Byron in points (and advance in the tiebreaker). In the end, Ryan Blaney would win back to back runnings of the event to advance to the Championship 4 with Joey Logano, Tyler Reddick, and William Byron. The drivers eliminated from the Round of 8 were Bell, Kyle Larson, Denny Hamlin, and Elliott.

Round 36: NASCAR Cup Championship Race

Martin Truex Jr. won the pole for the second straight race. Joey Logano won the first stage. Right after, the red flag came out before the restart, as the pace car hit the barrels on the SAFER barrier. Ryan Blaney won the second and final stage of the season. In a close battle at the end of the race between Logano and Blaney, Logano would win the race and the 2024 Championship.

== Results and standings ==
=== Race results ===
No.	Race	Pole position	Most laps led	Winning driver	Manufacturer	Report
	Busch Light Clash at The Coliseum	Denny Hamlin	Ty Gibbs	Denny Hamlin	Toyota	Report
	Bluegreen Vacations Duel 1	Joey Logano	Kyle Larson	Tyler Reddick	Toyota	Report
	Bluegreen Vacations Duel 2	Michael McDowell	Bubba Wallace	Christopher Bell	Toyota	Report
1	Daytona 500	Joey Logano	Joey Logano	William Byron	Chevrolet	Report
2	Ambetter Health 400	Michael McDowell	Todd Gilliland	Daniel Suárez	Chevrolet	Report
3	Pennzoil 400	Joey Logano	Kyle Larson	Kyle Larson	Chevrolet	Report
4	Shriners Children's 500	Denny Hamlin	Denny Hamlin; Tyler Reddick (Note: Hamlin and Reddick both led 68 laps.)	Christopher Bell	Toyota	Report
5	Food City 500	Ryan Blaney	Denny Hamlin	Denny Hamlin	Toyota	Report
6	EchoPark Automotive Grand Prix	William Byron	William Byron	William Byron	Chevrolet	Report
7	Toyota Owners 400	Kyle Larson	Martin Truex Jr.	Denny Hamlin	Toyota	Report
8	Cook Out 400	Kyle Larson	William Byron	William Byron	Chevrolet	Report
9	Autotrader EchoPark Automotive 400	Kyle Larson	Kyle Larson	Chase Elliott	Chevrolet	Report
10	GEICO 500	Michael McDowell	Michael McDowell	Tyler Reddick	Toyota	Report
11	Würth 400	Kyle Busch	Denny Hamlin	Denny Hamlin	Toyota	Report
12	AdventHealth 400	Christopher Bell	Denny Hamlin	Kyle Larson	Chevrolet	Report
13	Goodyear 400	Tyler Reddick	Tyler Reddick	Brad Keselowski	Ford	Report
	NASCAR All-Star Open	Ty Gibbs	Ty Gibbs	Ty Gibbs	Toyota	Report
	NASCAR All-Star Race	Joey Logano	Joey Logano	Joey Logano	Ford	Report
14	Coca-Cola 600	Ty Gibbs	Christopher Bell	Christopher Bell	Toyota	Report
15	Enjoy Illinois 300	Michael McDowell	Christopher Bell	Austin Cindric	Ford	Report
16	Toyota/Save Mart 350	Joey Logano	Tyler Reddick	Kyle Larson	Chevrolet	Report
17	Iowa Corn 350	Kyle Larson	Ryan Blaney	Ryan Blaney	Ford	Report
18	USA Today 301	Chase Elliott	Christopher Bell	Christopher Bell	Toyota	Report
19	Ally 400	Denny Hamlin	Christopher Bell	Joey Logano	Ford	Report
20	Grant Park 165	Kyle Larson	Ty Gibbs	Alex Bowman	Chevrolet	Report
21	The Great American Getaway 400	Ty Gibbs	Ryan Blaney	Ryan Blaney	Ford	Report
22	Brickyard 400	Tyler Reddick	Tyler Reddick	Kyle Larson	Chevrolet	Report
23	Cook Out 400	Denny Hamlin	Denny Hamlin	Austin Dillon	Chevrolet	Report
24	FireKeepers Casino 400	Denny Hamlin	Kyle Larson	Tyler Reddick	Toyota	Report
25	Coke Zero Sugar 400	Michael McDowell	Joey Logano	Harrison Burton	Ford	Report
26	Cook Out Southern 500	Bubba Wallace	Kyle Larson	Chase Briscoe	Ford	Report
NASCAR Cup Series Playoffs
Round of 16
27	Quaker State 400	Michael McDowell	Austin Cindric	Joey Logano	Ford	Report
28	Go Bowling at The Glen	Ross Chastain	Ross Chastain	Chris Buescher	Ford	Report
29	Bass Pro Shops Night Race	Alex Bowman	Kyle Larson	Kyle Larson	Chevrolet	Report
Round of 12
30	Hollywood Casino 400	Christopher Bell	Christopher Bell	Ross Chastain	Chevrolet	Report
31	YellaWood 500	Michael McDowell	Michael McDowell	Ricky Stenhouse Jr.	Chevrolet	Report
32	Bank of America Roval 400	Shane van Gisbergen	Kyle Larson	Kyle Larson	Chevrolet	Report
Round of 8
33	South Point 400	Christopher Bell	Christopher Bell	Joey Logano	Ford	Report
34	Straight Talk Wireless 400	Tyler Reddick	Tyler Reddick	Tyler Reddick	Toyota	Report
35	Xfinity 500	Martin Truex Jr.	Brad Keselowski	Ryan Blaney	Ford	Report
Championship 4
36	NASCAR Cup Series Championship Race	Martin Truex Jr.	Christopher Bell	Joey Logano	Ford	Report

=== Drivers' championship ===
(key) Bold – Pole position awarded by time. Italics – Pole position set by competition-based formula. * – Most laps led. ^{1} – Stage 1 winner. ^{2} – Stage 2 winner. ^{3} – Stage 3 winner. (Note: Stage 3 Winner only for Coca-Cola 600 and Daytona 500 qualifying race, but no playoff point at Daytona)^{1–10} - Regular season top 10 finishers.
. – Eliminated after Round of 16 . – Eliminated after Round of 12 . – Eliminated after Round of 8

Pos.	Driver	DAY	ATL	LVS	PHO	BRI	COA	RCH	MAR	TEX	TAL	DOV	KAN	DAR	CLT	GTW	SON	IOW	NHA	NSS	CSC	POC	IND	RCH	MCH	DAY	DAR	ATL	GLN	BRI	KAN	TAL	ROV	LVS	HOM	MAR	PHO	Pts.	Stage	Bonus
1	Joey Logano	**32***	28	**9**	34	22	11	2	6	11	19^{2}	16	34	21	14	5	**21**	6	32	1	23	5	34	19	33	31*^{2}	8	1	15	28	14	33	8	1	28	10	1^{1}	5040	–	17
2	Ryan Blaney	30^{2}	2	3	5	**16**	12	19	5	33	20	7	12	36	39	24	7	1*^{1}	25	6	10	1*	3	11	18^{1}	29	37	3^{1}	38	6	4	39	10	32	2	1	2^{2}	5035	–	19^{6}
3	William Byron	1	17	10	18	35	**1***	7	1*	3	7	33	23	6	3^{1}	15	30	2	26	19	8	4	38	13	2	27	30	9	34	17	2^{1}	3	3	4	6	6	3	5034	–	23^{5}
4	Tyler Reddick	29	30	2	10*^{1}	30	5	10	7	4	1	11	20	**32***^{2}	4	4	8*^{1}	22	6	3	2	6	**2***	3	1	28	10	6	27	20	25	20	11^{1}	36^{1}	**1***^{1}	34	6	5031	–	29^{1}
NASCAR Cup Series Playoffs cut-off
Pos.	Driver	DAY	ATL	LVS	PHO	BRI	COA	RCH	MAR	TEX	TAL	DOV	KAN	DAR	CLT	GTW	SON	IOW	NHA	NSS	CSC	POC	IND	RCH	MCH	DAY	DAR	ATL	GLN	BRI	KAN	TAL	ROV	LVS	HOM	MAR	PHO	Pts.	Stage	Bonus
5	Christopher Bell	3	34	33	1^{2}	10	2^{1}	6	35	17	38	34	**6**	13	1*^{23}	7*^{12}	9	4	1*^{1}	36*^{12}	37	12	4	6^{1}	35	3	3	4	14	5	**7***	6	2	**2***^{2}	4	22	5*	2412	54	33^{4}
6	Kyle Larson	11	32	1*^{12}	14	5	17	**3**^{1}	**2**^{1}	**21***^{1}	21	2^{2}	1	34^{1}	QL^{†}	10	1	**34**^{2}	4	8	**39**	13	1	7	34*	21	4*^{12}	37	12	1*^{12}	26	4	1*	11	13	3	4	2378	19	52^{2}
7	Chase Elliott	14^{1}	15	12	19	8	16	5	3	1	15	5	3	12	7	13	4	3	18	18	21	9	10	9	15	36	11	8	19	2	9	29	5	33	5	2^{1}	8	2342	36	14^{3}
8	Denny Hamlin	19	23	8	**11***	1*^{‡}	14^{2}	1	11^{2}	30	37	1*	5*^{1}	4	5	2	38	24	24^{2}	**12**	30	2^{2}	32^{1}	**2***	9	38	7	24	23	4	8	10	14	8	3^{2}	5	11	2328	31	15^{7}
9	Alex Bowman	2	27	18	20	4	4	17	8	37	5	8	7	8	9	28	15	8	36	14	1	3	31	28	27	16	19	5	18	**9**	6^{2}	16	38	5	7	13	14	2318	31	6
10	Martin Truex Jr.	15	12	7	7	2	10	4*^{2}	18	14	11	3^{1}	4	25	12	34	27	15	9	24	33	8^{1}	27	37	24	24	36	35	20^{1}	24	3	11	21	6	23	**24**	**17**	2257	67	5^{10}
11	Austin Cindric	22	4^{2}	29	36	31	18	23	23	25	23^{1}	15	37	20	20	1	22	30	19	15	15	18	7	24	28	18	13	10*^{2}	10	13	34	32^{2}	4	34	27	4	13	2247	24	9
12	Daniel Suárez	34	1	11	13	18	31	22	22	5	27	18	27	24	24	23	14	9	21	22	11	16	8	10^{2}	8	40	18	2	13	31	13	26	30	3	16	23	10	2226	3	6
13	Brad Keselowski	33	33	13	4	3	33	8	24	2	2	30	11	1	2	3	13	10	28	25	18	7	21	16	5	8	14	19	26	26	22	2	23	35	17	9*^{2}	15	2208	25	8^{8}
14	Chase Briscoe	10	31	21	9	13	13	18	10	6	12	19	21	5	25	17	34	28	2	21	32	15	24	21	31	14	1	38	6	8	24	30	36	26	12	15	29	2184	12	5
15	Ty Gibbs	17	10	5	3	9^{12}	3	16	19	13	22	10	32	2	**6**	11	37	25	16	23	3*	**27**	23	22	3	5	20	17	22	15	5	13	35	30	36	32	40	2169	36	4^{9}
16	Harrison Burton	39	11	30	27	32	30	34	33	28	10	26	36	22	32	31	25	20	14	28	25	31	36	32	14	1	21	31	24	35	23	34	20	15	24	36	16	2122	5	5
17	Chris Buescher	18	9	37	2	7	8	9	15	15	25	17	2^{2}	30	23	14	3^{2}	18	5	5	20	11	22	18	6	10	6	36	1	14	11	17^{1}	17	10	15	30	9	930	107	2
18	Bubba Wallace	5	5	35	16	29	15	13	4	7	36	32	17	7	11	21	20	17	34	7	13	10	5^{2}	4	26	6	**16**	29	17	3	17	9	9	12	18	18	7	878	147	1
19	Ross Chastain	21	7	4	6	15	7	15	14	32^{2}	13	12	19	11	8	12	5	11	10	33	22	36	15	5	25	12	5	13	**4***^{2}	10	1	40	28	7	33	8	19	852	100	1
20	Kyle Busch	12	3	26	22	25	9	20	16	9	26	**4**	8	27	15	35	12	35	35	27	9	32	25	12	4^{2}	2	2	7	30	25	19	19	13	13	31	28	21	766	93	1
21	Carson Hocevar **(R)**	40	19	15	15	27	22	27	17	10	17	22	24	26	21	8	17	14	17	16	24	17	12	8	10	11	33	16	3	18	32	14	12	23	9	25	18	686	27	–
22	Todd Gilliland	35	26*	24	17	26	26	21	13	31	8	31	14	15	17	16	10	12	12	17	7	34	6	17	36	23	17	27	16	32	27	23	18	31	20	26	20	630	49	–
23	Michael McDowell	36	**8**^{1}	25	8	11	38	26	21	35	**31***	36	10	10	16	**25**	2	23	15	35	5	24	16	15	19	**30**	28	**22**	7	11	29	**37***	15	20	14	33	31	624	56	1
24	Noah Gragson	9	36	6	12	34	34	12	20	18	3	6	9	14	38	22	26	16	27	10	14	37	9	20	12	37	32	34	11	12	18	25	31	18	19	11	12	612	14	–
25	Ricky Stenhouse Jr.	31	6	17	21	33	28	33	29	23	4	35	16	23	31	20	24	5	7	30	6	33	11	36	13	33	22	14	37	27	28	1	16	27	21	20	33	590	47	–
26	Ryan Preece	23	16	23	23	14	23	28	9	12	14	37	28	17	26	29	18	27	11	4	34	30	26	25	11	39	12	18	9	7	16	35	25	22	10	14	37	584	33	–
27	Josh Berry **(R)**	25	29	20	26	12	35	11	25	36	16	14	15	3	10	36	32	7	3	26	36	20	35	14	22	26^{1}	31	28	25	29	38	36	22	24	11	16	24	579	64	1
28	Erik Jones	8	25	14	31	20	32	14	12	19	35			19	19	26	19	32	13	34	29	14	28	29	16	17	24	26	33	30	35	5	33	25	22	19	22	516	31	–
29	Daniel Hemric	16	18	19	28	28	37	30	28	20	9	9	30	33	18	18	28	29	31	9	12	25	30	30	23	9	29	11	31	19	20	38	24	19	29	17	23	515	7	–
30	Zane Smith **(R)**	13	35	36	29	36	19	35	31	26	29	24	29	35	33	19	16	31	30	2	17	29	17	23	7	13	23	21	5	16	10	21	19	16	30	21	39	505	–	–
31	Justin Haley	26	20	27	24	17	39	32	30	24	34	23	18	9	22	9	33	13	29	13	16	22	20	27	20	32	27	12	29	22	33	7	26	17	34	29	28	503	10	–
32	Austin Dillon	37	22	16	32	24	25	24	34	8	30	27	25	28	27	6	36	19	33	32	19	23	13	1^{±}	17	22	15	20	28	21	12	8	32	37	25	7	27	493	42	–
33	Corey LaJoie	4	13	32	33	21	24	36	32	22	18	21	26	16	35	32	11	21	23	20	27	19	14	34	32	34	9	15	8	36	15	18	37	14	35	35	32	489	10	–
34	John Hunter Nemechek	7	21	22	25	6	21	25	36	34	33	20	13	31	30	27	29	26	8	31	35	28	29	31	29	15	25	33	21	33	30	31	34	9	26	31	30	447	17	–
35	Kaz Grala **(R)**	38	14	31	30	19	27	31	26	27		29		18	34		23	33	22		26						34		35	37	31		27		32	27	34	206	–	–
36	Cody Ware										24					33						26	18		21	4		30				12		21				146	1	–
37	Jimmie Johnson	28								29		28	38		29								33								36			28			26	60	–	–
38	Derek Kraus			28	35								31	29		30																					25	44	–	–
39	Joey Hand																				4^{2}																	43	10	1
40	David Ragan	20																																				17	–	–
41	Kamui Kobayashi						29																															8	–	–
42	Will Brown																31																					6	–	–
43	Juan Pablo Montoya																												32									5	–	–
44	Cameron Waters																35																					2	–	–
Ineligible for driver points
Pos.	Driver	DAY	ATL	LVS	PHO	BRI	COA	RCH	MAR	TEX	TAL	DOV	KAN	DAR	CLT	GTW	SON	IOW	NHA	NSS	CSC	POC	IND	RCH	MCH	DAY	DAR	ATL	GLN	BRI	KAN	TAL	ROV	LVS	HOM	MAR	PHO	Pts.	Stage	Bonus
	Shane van Gisbergen						20				28				28						40^{1}					35	26	32	2			15	**7**	29		12				
	A. J. Allmendinger	6				23	6					13					6	36		11	38	21	37		30				36	23		28	6^{2}		8					
	Anthony Alfredo	27									6																					24								
	Parker Retzlaff																							35		7														
	Justin Allgaier														13																									
	Ty Dillon							29		16					36				20				19	26							21									
	B. J. McLeod	DNQ	24								32				37								39			19		25				22								
	Joey Gase																									20														
	Corey Heim											25	22							29																				
	J. J. Yeley	DNQ		34											40							35						23			37	27			38		35			
	Riley Herbst	24											35							37				33																
	Austin Hill									38			33								31					25														
	Josh Williams		37						27																															
	Josh Bilicki																				28									34			29			37				
	Timmy Hill						36																				35													
	Chad Finchum																			38															37		36			
	David Starr								37						Wth			Wth																						
	Jeb Burton																																				38			
Pos.	Driver	DAY	ATL	LVS	PHO	BRI	COA	RCH	MAR	TEX	TAL	DOV	KAN	DAR	CLT	GTW	SON	IOW	NHA	NSS	CSC	POC	IND	RCH	MCH	DAY	DAR	ATL	GLN	BRI	KAN	TAL	ROV	LVS	HOM	MAR	PHO	Pts.	Stage	Bonus
^{†} – Kyle Larson originally qualified for the race, but was replaced before the start of the race to compete in the Indianapolis 500, and was replaced by Justin Allgaier.^{±} – Austin Dillon was allowed to keep his Richmond win, but was penalized 25 points and his win not counted toward the playoffs.^{‡} – Denny Hamlin was fined 75 points and 10 playoff points for a L2 penalty, and his Bristol win also did not count towards the playoffs.

=== Manufacturers' championship ===
Pos	Manufacturer	Wins	Points
1	Chevrolet	15	1309
2	Ford	12	1275
3	Toyota	9	1259

== See also ==
- 2024 NASCAR Xfinity Series
- 2024 NASCAR Craftsman Truck Series
- 2024 ARCA Menards Series
- 2024 ARCA Menards Series East
- 2024 ARCA Menards Series West
- 2024 NASCAR Whelen Modified Tour
- 2024 NASCAR Canada Series
- 2024 NASCAR Mexico Series
- 2024 NASCAR Whelen Euro Series
- 2024 NASCAR Brasil Sprint Race
- 2024 CARS Tour
- 2024 SMART Modified Tour
