= 2024 Pennzoil 400 =

Race details
- Race 3 of 36 in the 2024 NASCAR Cup Series
- Date: March 3, 2024
- Location: Las Vegas Motor Speedway in Las Vegas
- Course: Permanent racing facility
- Course length: 1.5 miles (2.4 km)
- Distance: 267 laps, 400.5 mi (640.8 km)
- Average speed: 133.192 miles per hour (214.352 km/h)

Pole position
Driver	Joey Logano	Team Penske
- Time: 29.291

Most laps led
Driver	Kyle Larson	Hendrick Motorsports
- Laps: 181

Winner
No. 5	Kyle Larson	Hendrick Motorsports

Television in the United States
- Network: Fox
- Announcers: Mike Joy, Clint Bowyer, and Kevin Harvick

Radio in the United States
- Radio: PRN
- Booth announcers: Doug Rice and Mark Garrow
- Turn announcers: Rob Albright (1 & 2) and Pat Patterson (3 & 4)

The 2024 Pennzoil 400 was a NASCAR Cup Series race held on March 3, 2024, at Las Vegas Motor Speedway in North Las Vegas, Nevada. Contested over 267 laps on the 1.5 mi (2.4 km) asphalt intermediate speedway, it was the third race of the 2024 NASCAR Cup Series season. Kyle Larson won the race. Tyler Reddick finished 2nd, and Ryan Blaney finished 3rd. Ross Chastain and Ty Gibbs rounded out the top five, and Noah Gragson, Martin Truex Jr., Denny Hamlin, Joey Logano, and William Byron rounded out the top ten.

== Report ==
=== Background ===
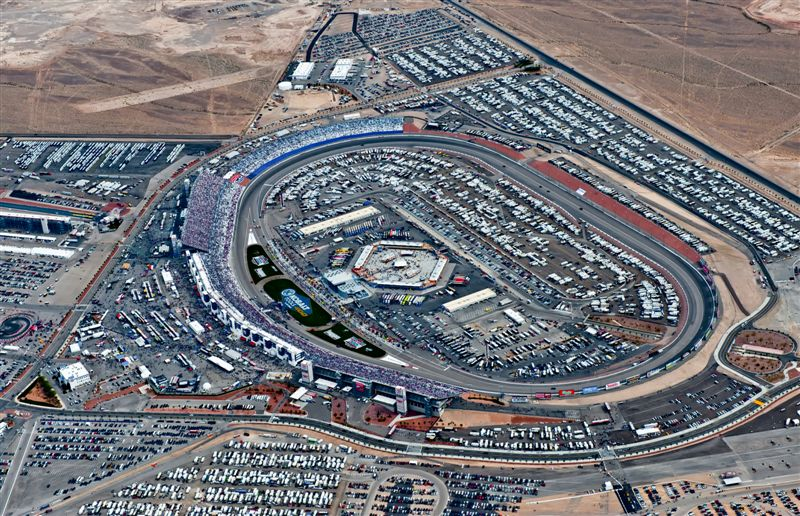
Las Vegas Motor Speedway, the track where the race was held.

Las Vegas Motor Speedway, located in Clark County, Nevada outside the Las Vegas city limits and about 15 miles northeast of the Las Vegas Strip, is a 1,200-acre (490 ha) complex of multiple tracks for motorsports racing. The complex is owned by Speedway Motorsports, Inc., which is headquartered in Charlotte, North Carolina.

==== Entry list ====
- (R) denotes rookie driver.
- (i) denotes driver who is ineligible for series driver points.

No.	Driver	Team	Manufacturer
1	Ross Chastain	Trackhouse Racing	Chevrolet
2	Austin Cindric	Team Penske	Ford
3	Austin Dillon	Richard Childress Racing	Chevrolet
4	Josh Berry (R)	Stewart–Haas Racing	Ford
5	Kyle Larson	Hendrick Motorsports	Chevrolet
6	Brad Keselowski	RFK Racing	Ford
7	Corey LaJoie	Spire Motorsports	Chevrolet
8	Kyle Busch	Richard Childress Racing	Chevrolet
9	Chase Elliott	Hendrick Motorsports	Chevrolet
10	Noah Gragson	Stewart–Haas Racing	Ford
11	Denny Hamlin	Joe Gibbs Racing	Toyota
12	Ryan Blaney	Team Penske	Ford
14	Chase Briscoe	Stewart–Haas Racing	Ford
15	Kaz Grala (R)	Rick Ware Racing	Ford
16	Derek Kraus	Kaulig Racing	Chevrolet
17	Chris Buescher	RFK Racing	Ford
19	Martin Truex Jr.	Joe Gibbs Racing	Toyota
20	Christopher Bell	Joe Gibbs Racing	Toyota
21	Harrison Burton	Wood Brothers Racing	Ford
22	Joey Logano	Team Penske	Ford
23	Bubba Wallace	23XI Racing	Toyota
24	William Byron	Hendrick Motorsports	Chevrolet
31	Daniel Hemric	Kaulig Racing	Chevrolet
34	Michael McDowell	Front Row Motorsports	Ford
38	Todd Gilliland	Front Row Motorsports	Ford
41	Ryan Preece	Stewart–Haas Racing	Ford
42	John Hunter Nemechek	Legacy Motor Club	Toyota
43	Erik Jones	Legacy Motor Club	Toyota
44	J. J. Yeley (i)	NY Racing Team	Chevrolet
45	Tyler Reddick	23XI Racing	Toyota
47	Ricky Stenhouse Jr.	JTG Daugherty Racing	Chevrolet
48	Alex Bowman	Hendrick Motorsports	Chevrolet
51	Justin Haley	Rick Ware Racing	Ford
54	Ty Gibbs	Joe Gibbs Racing	Toyota
71	Zane Smith (R)	Spire Motorsports	Chevrolet
77	Carson Hocevar (R)	Spire Motorsports	Chevrolet
99	Daniel Suárez	Trackhouse Racing	Chevrolet
Official entry list

== Practice ==
Ross Chastain was the fastest in the practice session with a time of 29.305 seconds and a speed of 184.269 mph (296.552 km/h).

=== Practice results ===
Pos	No.	Driver	Team	Manufacturer	Time	Speed
1	1	Ross Chastain	Trackhouse Racing	Chevrolet	29.305	184.269
2	10	Noah Gragson	Stewart–Haas Racing	Ford	29.402	183.661
3	54	Ty Gibbs	Joe Gibbs Racing	Toyota	29.531	182.859
Official practice results

== Qualifying ==
Joey Logano scored the pole for the race with a time of 29.291 and a speed of 184.357 mph (296.694 km/h). This was the first qualifying session where the inside & outside rows were set by times in Groups A & B respectively for 11th position on down.

=== Qualifying results ===
Pos	No.	Driver	Team	Manufacturer	R1	R2
1	22	Joey Logano	Team Penske	Ford	29.348	29.291
2	5	Kyle Larson	Hendrick Motorsports	Chevrolet	29.227	29.312
3	2	Austin Cindric	Team Penske	Ford	29.309	29.333
4	24	William Byron	Hendrick Motorsports	Chevrolet	29.195	29.362
5	23	Bubba Wallace	23XI Racing	Toyota	29.382	29.404
6	14	Chase Briscoe	Stewart–Haas Racing	Ford	29.228	29.430
7	19	Martin Truex Jr.	Joe Gibbs Racing	Toyota	29.392	29.481
8	54	Ty Gibbs	Joe Gibbs Racing	Toyota	29.356	29.484
9	17	Chris Buescher	RFK Racing	Ford	29.335	29.520
10	20	Christopher Bell	Joe Gibbs Racing	Toyota	29.373	29.580
11	9	Chase Elliott	Hendrick Motorsports	Chevrolet	29.357	—
12	34	Michael McDowell	Front Row Motorsports	Ford	29.413	—
13	47	Ricky Stenhouse Jr.	JTG Daugherty Racing	Chevrolet	29.410	—
14	77	Carson Hocevar (R)	Spire Motorsports	Chevrolet	29.479	—
15	12	Ryan Blaney	Team Penske	Ford	29.438	—
16	99	Daniel Suárez	Trackhouse Racing	Chevrolet	29.534	—
17	7	Corey LaJoie	Spire Motorsports	Chevrolet	29.441	—
18	45	Tyler Reddick	23XI Racing	Toyota	29.587	—
19	3	Austin Dillon	Richard Childress Racing	Chevrolet	29.498	—
20	1	Ross Chastain	Trackhouse Racing	Chevrolet	29.592	—
21	8	Kyle Busch	Richard Childress Racing	Chevrolet	29.554	—
22	43	Erik Jones	Legacy Motor Club	Toyota	29.620	—
23	48	Alex Bowman	Hendrick Motorsports	Chevrolet	29.575	—
24	71	Zane Smith (R)	Spire Motorsports	Chevrolet	29.620	—
25	6	Brad Keselowski	RFK Racing	Ford	29.689	—
26	4	Josh Berry (R)	Stewart–Haas Racing	Ford	29.647	—
27	42	John Hunter Nemechek	Legacy Motor Club	Toyota	29.730	—
28	11	Denny Hamlin	Joe Gibbs Racing	Toyota	29.654	—
29	21	Harrison Burton	Wood Brothers Racing	Ford	29.821	—
30	10	Noah Gragson	Stewart–Haas Racing	Ford	29.795	—
31	38	Todd Gilliland	Front Row Motorsports	Ford	29.884	—
32	15	Kaz Grala (R)	Rick Ware Racing	Ford	29.795	—
33	16	Derek Kraus	Kaulig Racing	Chevrolet	30.175	—
34	31	Daniel Hemric	Kaulig Racing	Chevrolet	29.936	—
35	51	Justin Haley	Rick Ware Racing	Ford	0.000	—
36	41	Ryan Preece	Stewart–Haas Racing	Ford	0.000	—
37	44	J. J. Yeley (i)	NY Racing Team	Chevrolet	0.000	—
Official qualifying results

== Race ==
=== Race results ===
==== Stage Results ====
Stage One Laps: 80

Pos	No	Driver	Team	Manufacturer	Points
1	5	Kyle Larson	Hendrick Motorsports	Chevrolet	10
2	45	Tyler Reddick	23XI Racing	Toyota	9
3	19	Martin Truex Jr.	Joe Gibbs Racing	Toyota	8
4	8	Kyle Busch	Richard Childress Racing	Chevrolet	7
5	11	Denny Hamlin	Joe Gibbs Racing	Toyota	6
6	54	Ty Gibbs	Joe Gibbs Racing	Toyota	5
7	7	Corey LaJoie	Spire Motorsports	Chevrolet	4
8	1	Ross Chastain	Trackhouse Racing	Chevrolet	3
9	2	Austin Cindric	Team Penske	Ford	2
10	20	Christopher Bell	Joe Gibbs Racing	Toyota	1
Official stage one results

Stage Two Laps: 85

Pos	No	Driver	Team	Manufacturer	Points
1	5	Kyle Larson	Hendrick Motorsports	Chevrolet	10
2	45	Tyler Reddick	23XI Racing	Toyota	9
3	11	Denny Hamlin	Joe Gibbs Racing	Toyota	8
4	12	Ryan Blaney	Team Penske	Ford	7
5	19	Martin Truex Jr.	Joe Gibbs Racing	Toyota	6
6	9	Chase Elliott	Hendrick Motorsports	Chevrolet	5
7	3	Austin Dillon	Richard Childress Racing	Chevrolet	4
8	48	Alex Bowman	Hendrick Motorsports	Chevrolet	3
9	22	Joey Logano	Team Penske	Ford	2
10	43	Erik Jones	Legacy Motor Club	Toyota	1
Official stage two results

=== Final Stage Results ===
Stage Three Laps: 102

Pos	Grid	No	Driver	Team	Manufacturer	Laps	Points
1	2	5	Kyle Larson	Hendrick Motorsports	Chevrolet	267	60
2	18	45	Tyler Reddick	23XI Racing	Toyota	267	53
3	15	12	Ryan Blaney	Team Penske	Ford	267	41
4	20	1	Ross Chastain	Trackhouse Racing	Chevrolet	267	36
5	8	54	Ty Gibbs	Joe Gibbs Racing	Toyota	267	37
6	30	10	Noah Gragson	Stewart–Haas Racing	Ford	267	31
7	7	19	Martin Truex Jr.	Joe Gibbs Racing	Toyota	267	44
8	28	11	Denny Hamlin	Joe Gibbs Racing	Toyota	267	43
9	1	22	Joey Logano	Team Penske	Ford	267	30
10	4	24	William Byron	Hendrick Motorsports	Chevrolet	267	27
11	16	99	Daniel Suárez	Trackhouse Racing	Chevrolet	267	26
12	11	9	Chase Elliott	Hendrick Motorsports	Chevrolet	267	30
13	25	6	Brad Keselowski	RFK Racing	Ford	267	24
14	22	43	Erik Jones	Legacy Motor Club	Toyota	267	24
15	14	77	Carson Hocevar (R)	Spire Motorsports	Chevrolet	267	22
16	19	3	Austin Dillon	Richard Childress Racing	Chevrolet	267	25
17	13	47	Ricky Stenhouse Jr.	JTG Daugherty Racing	Chevrolet	267	20
18	23	48	Alex Bowman	Hendrick Motorsports	Chevrolet	267	22
19	34	31	Daniel Hemric	Kaulig Racing	Chevrolet	267	18
20	26	4	Josh Berry (R)	Stewart–Haas Racing	Ford	267	17
21	6	14	Chase Briscoe	Stewart–Haas Racing	Ford	267	16
22	27	42	John Hunter Nemechek	Legacy Motor Club	Toyota	267	15
23	36	41	Ryan Preece	Stewart–Haas Racing	Ford	267	14
24	31	38	Todd Gilliland	Front Row Motorsports	Ford	267	13
25	12	34	Michael McDowell	Front Row Motorsports	Ford	267	12
26	21	8	Kyle Busch	Richard Childress Racing	Chevrolet	267	18
27	35	51	Justin Haley	Rick Ware Racing	Ford	267	10
28	33	16	Derek Kraus	Kaulig Racing	Chevrolet	267	9
29	3	2	Austin Cindric	Team Penske	Ford	267	10
30	29	21	Harrison Burton	Wood Brothers Racing	Ford	267	7
31	32	15	Kaz Grala (R)	Rick Ware Racing	Ford	267	6
32	17	7	Corey LaJoie	Spire Motorsports	Chevrolet	266	9
33	10	20	Christopher Bell	Joe Gibbs Racing	Toyota	265	5
34	37	44	J. J. Yeley (i)	NY Racing Team	Chevrolet	261	0
35	5	23	Bubba Wallace	23XI Racing	Toyota	254	2
36	24	71	Zane Smith (R)	Spire Motorsports	Chevrolet	254	1
37	9	17	Chris Buescher	RFK Racing	Ford	27	1
Official race results

=== Race statistics ===
- Lead changes: 24 among 15 different drivers
- Cautions/Laps: 6 for 35 laps
- Red flags: 1 for 10 minutes and 39 seconds
- Time of race: 3 hours, 0 minutes and 25 seconds
- Average speed: 133.192 miles per hour (214.352 km/h)

== Media ==
=== Television ===
Fox Sports was carried by Fox in the United States. Mike Joy, Clint Bowyer, and two-time Las Vegas winner Kevin Harvick called the race from the broadcast booth. Jamie Little and Regan Smith handled pit road for the television side, and Larry McReynolds provided insight from the Fox Sports studio in Charlotte.

Fox
Booth announcers	Pit reporters	In-race analyst
Lap-by-lap: Mike Joy; Color-commentator: Clint Bowyer; Color-commentator: Kevin Harvick	Jamie Little; Regan Smith	Larry McReynolds

=== Radio ===
PRN covered the radio call for the race which was also simulcasted on Sirius XM NASCAR Radio. Doug Rice and Mark Garrow called the race in the booth where the field raced through the tri-oval. Rob Albright called the race from a billboard in turn 2 where the field raced through turns 1 and 2. Pat Patterson called the race from a billboard outside of turn 3 where the field raced through turns 3 and 4. Brad Gillie, Brett McMillan, Wendy Venturini, and Heather Debeaux worked pit road for the radio side.

PRN
Booth announcers	Turn announcers	Pit reporters
Lead announcer: Doug Rice; Announcer: Mark Garrow	Turns 1 & 2: Rob Albright; Turns 3 & 4: Pat Patterson	Brad Gillie; Brett McMillan; Wendy Venturini; Heather Debeaux

== Standings after the race ==
Drivers' Championship standings

	Pos	Driver	Points
10	1	Kyle Larson	118
3	2	Ryan Blaney	110 (–8)
7	3	Martin Truex Jr.	104 (–14)
2	4	William Byron	103 (–15)
3	5	Ross Chastain	98 (–20)
5	6	Kyle Busch	95 (–23)
1	7	Chase Elliott	95 (–23)
1	8	Daniel Suárez	90 (–28)
5	9	Ty Gibbs	87 (–31)
9	10	Denny Hamlin	87 (–31)
8	11	Austin Cindric	86 (–32)
13	12	Tyler Reddick	84 (–34)
4	13	Alex Bowman	82 (–36)
10	14	Bubba Wallace	76 (–42)
2	15	Erik Jones	71 (–47)
3	16	John Hunter Nemechek	68 (–50)
Official driver's standings

Manufacturers' Championship standings

Pos	Manufacturer	Points
1	Chevrolet	120
2	Toyota	101 (–19)
3	Ford	97 (–23)

- Note: Only the first 16 positions are included for the driver standings.

Previous race: 2024 Ambetter Health 400	NASCAR Cup Series; 2024 season	Next race: 2024 Shriners Children's 500
