= 2024 Busch Light Clash at The Coliseum =

Non-points exhibition NASCAR race

Race details
- Race 1 of 2 exhibition races in the 2024 NASCAR Cup Series
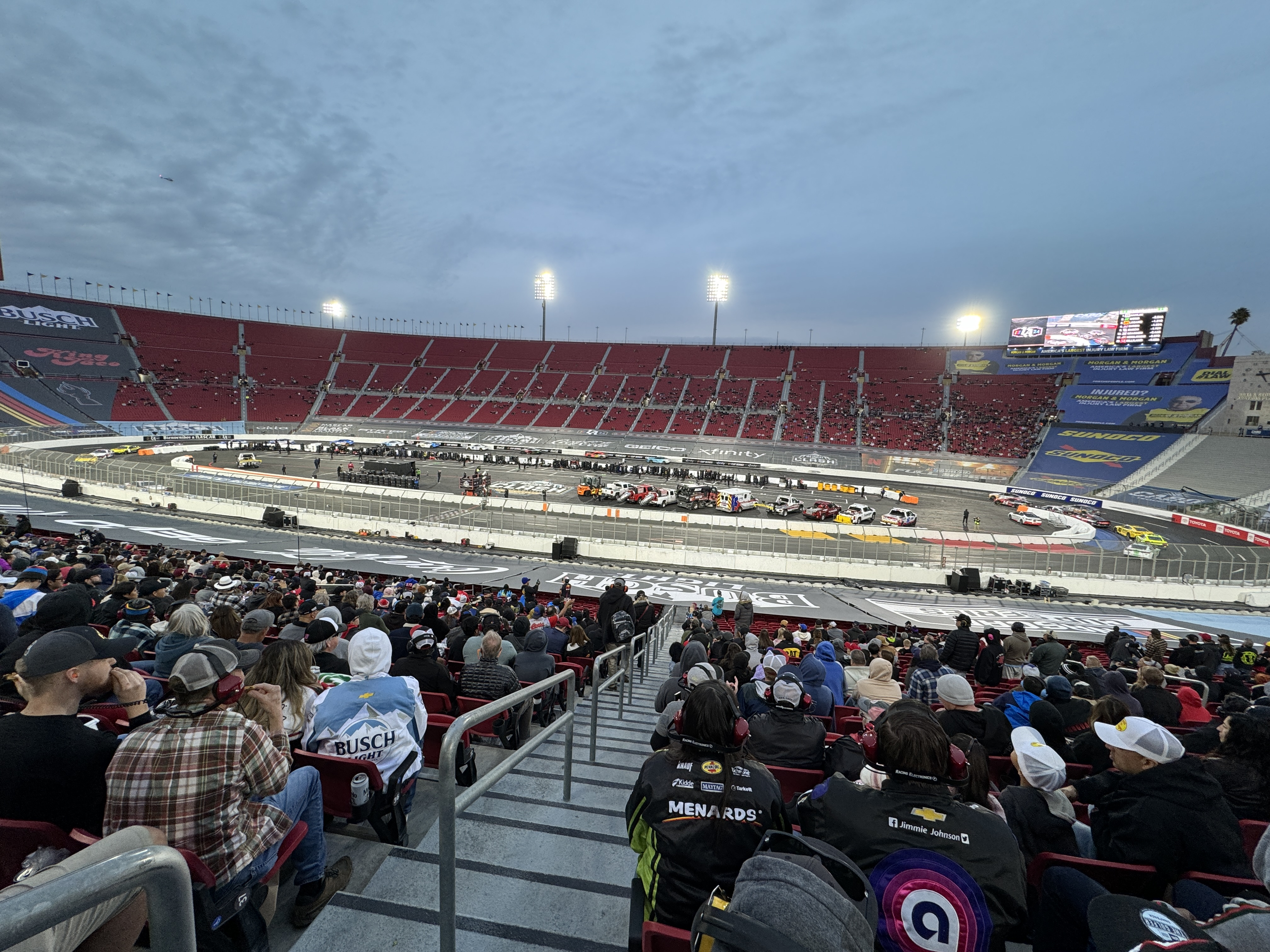
- Date: February 3, 2024
- Location: Los Angeles Memorial Coliseum in Los Angeles, California
- Course: Temporary race course in permanent stadium
- Course length: 0.25 miles (0.40 km)
- Distance: 151 laps, 37.75 mi (60.4 km)
- Scheduled distance: 150 laps, 37.5 mi (60 km)
- Average speed: 32.937 miles per hour (53.007 km/h)

Pole position
Driver	Denny Hamlin	Joe Gibbs Racing

Most laps led
Driver	Ty Gibbs	Joe Gibbs Racing
- Laps: 84

Winner
No. 11	Denny Hamlin	Joe Gibbs Racing

Television in the United States
- Network: FS1
- Announcers: Mike Joy, Clint Bowyer, and Kevin Harvick

Radio in the United States
- Radio: MRN
- Booth announcers: Alex Hayden and Jeff Striegle
- Turn announcers: Dan Hubbard (Backstretch)

The 2024 Busch Light Clash at The Coliseum was a NASCAR Cup Series race held on February 3, 2024, at Los Angeles Memorial Coliseum in Los Angeles, California. Contested over 151 laps — extended from 150 laps due to an overtime finish, it was the first exhibition race of the 2024 NASCAR Cup Series season.

== Format and eligibility ==
On September 14, 2021, NASCAR announced that the Busch Clash would move to the Los Angeles Memorial Coliseum. On January 16, 2024, the format for the 2024 Clash was announced:

- The event is open for all teams and drivers.
- A total of 325 laps in six races.
- The 36 charter teams and up to four open teams will participate in qualifying. Should more than 40 teams enter the race, it is unknown if qualifying will determine who advances to heat races.
- Based on lap times, cars are put in one of four heat races of 25 laps each. The top five drivers in each heat advance to the feature.
- All non-qualifying drivers are assigned to one 75 lap heat races. The top two drivers from the heat race advance to the feature.
- The highest driver in 2023 Cup Series points standings not in will also advance to the feature in the last position.
- The feature is 150 laps and will have 23 cars start the race. There will be no pit stops in this race

On February 3, NASCAR moved up the Clash to that day from February 4, due to the incoming threat of life-threatening flooding from a massive atmospheric river. The heat races were cancelled and the starting lineup would be determined by the fastest 22 drivers in qualifying with the final spot being determined by whoever placed the highest in the 2023 Owners Point Standings.

=== Entry list ===
- (R) denotes rookie driver.
- (i) denotes driver who is ineligible for series driver points.

No.	Driver	Team	Manufacturer
1	Ross Chastain	Trackhouse Racing	Chevrolet
2	Austin Cindric	Team Penske	Ford
3	Austin Dillon	Richard Childress Racing	Chevrolet
4	Josh Berry (R)	Stewart–Haas Racing	Ford
5	Kyle Larson	Hendrick Motorsports	Chevrolet
6	Brad Keselowski	RFK Racing	Ford
7	Corey LaJoie	Spire Motorsports	Chevrolet
8	Kyle Busch	Richard Childress Racing	Chevrolet
9	Chase Elliott	Hendrick Motorsports	Chevrolet
10	Noah Gragson	Stewart–Haas Racing	Ford
11	Denny Hamlin	Joe Gibbs Racing	Toyota
12	Ryan Blaney	Team Penske	Ford
14	Chase Briscoe	Stewart–Haas Racing	Ford
15	Kaz Grala (R)	Rick Ware Racing	Ford
16	Josh Williams (i)	Kaulig Racing	Chevrolet
17	Chris Buescher	RFK Racing	Ford
19	Martin Truex Jr.	Joe Gibbs Racing	Toyota
20	Christopher Bell	Joe Gibbs Racing	Toyota
21	Harrison Burton	Wood Brothers Racing	Ford
22	Joey Logano	Team Penske	Ford
23	Bubba Wallace	23XI Racing	Toyota
24	William Byron	Hendrick Motorsports	Chevrolet
31	Daniel Hemric	Kaulig Racing	Chevrolet
34	Michael McDowell	Front Row Motorsports	Ford
38	Todd Gilliland	Front Row Motorsports	Ford
41	Ryan Preece	Stewart–Haas Racing	Ford
42	John Hunter Nemechek	Legacy Motor Club	Toyota
43	Erik Jones	Legacy Motor Club	Toyota
45	Tyler Reddick	23XI Racing	Toyota
47	Ricky Stenhouse Jr.	JTG Daugherty Racing	Chevrolet
48	Alex Bowman	Hendrick Motorsports	Chevrolet
51	Justin Haley	Rick Ware Racing	Ford
54	Ty Gibbs	Joe Gibbs Racing	Toyota
71	Zane Smith (R)	Spire Motorsports	Chevrolet
77	Carson Hocevar (R)	Spire Motorsports	Chevrolet
99	Daniel Suárez	Trackhouse Racing	Chevrolet
Official entry list

== Practice ==
Denny Hamlin was the fastest in the practice session with a time of 13.139 and a speed of 68.498 mph (110.237 km/h) .

=== Practice results ===
Pos	No.	Driver	Team	Manufacturer	Time	Speed
1	11	Denny Hamlin	Joe Gibbs Racing	Toyota	13.139	68.498
2	22	Joey Logano	Team Penske	Ford	13.250	67.925
3	54	Ty Gibbs	Joe Gibbs Racing	Toyota	13.261	67.868
Official practice results

== Qualifying ==
Denny Hamlin scored the pole for the race with a time of 13.139 and a speed of 68.498 mph (110.237 km/h).

=== Qualifying results ===
Pos	No.	Driver	Team	Manufacturer	Time
1	11	Denny Hamlin	Joe Gibbs Racing	Toyota	13.139
2	22	Joey Logano	Team Penske	Ford	13.250
3	54	Ty Gibbs	Joe Gibbs Racing	Toyota	13.261
4	48	Alex Bowman	Hendrick Motorsports	Chevrolet	13.266
5	8	Kyle Busch	Richard Childress Racing	Chevrolet	13.273
6	24	William Byron	Hendrick Motorsports	Chevrolet	13.316
7	1	Ross Chastain	Trackhouse Racing	Chevrolet	13.319
8	5	Kyle Larson	Hendrick Motorsports	Chevrolet	13.324
9	23	Bubba Wallace	23XI Racing	Toyota	13.359
10	51	Justin Haley	Rick Ware Racing	Ford	13.369
11	45	Tyler Reddick	23XI Racing	Toyota	13.376
12	41	Ryan Preece	Stewart–Haas Racing	Ford	13.378
13	6	Brad Keselowski	RFK Racing	Ford	13.388
14	9	Chase Elliott	Hendrick Motorsports	Chevrolet	13.401
15	34	Michael McDowell	Front Row Motorsports	Ford	13.429
16	38	Todd Gilliland	Front Row Motorsports	Ford	13.429
17	10	Noah Gragson	Stewart–Haas Racing	Ford	13.433
18	7	Corey LaJoie	Spire Motorsports	Chevrolet	13.434
19	19	Martin Truex Jr.	Joe Gibbs Racing	Toyota	13.453
20	47	Ricky Stenhouse Jr.	JTG Daugherty Racing	Chevrolet	13.459
21	42	John Hunter Nemechek	Legacy Motor Club	Toyota	13.474
22	14	Chase Briscoe	Stewart–Haas Racing	Ford	13.484
23	16	Josh Williams (i)	Kaulig Racing	Chevrolet	13.498
24	77	Carson Hocevar (R)	Spire Motorsports	Chevrolet	13.499
25	4	Josh Berry (R)	Stewart–Haas Racing	Ford	13.513
26	12	Ryan Blaney	Team Penske	Ford	13.514
27	99	Daniel Suárez	Trackhouse Racing	Chevrolet	13.524
28	3	Austin Dillon	Richard Childress Racing	Chevrolet	13.535
29	43	Erik Jones	Legacy Motor Club	Toyota	13.570
30	17	Chris Buescher	RFK Racing	Ford	13.574
31	2	Austin Cindric	Team Penske	Ford	13.582
32	31	Daniel Hemric	Kaulig Racing	Chevrolet	13.592
33	20	Christopher Bell	Joe Gibbs Racing	Toyota	13.593
34	15	Kaz Grala	Rick Ware Racing	Ford	13.605
35	21	Harrison Burton	Wood Brothers Racing	Ford	13.617
36	71	Zane Smith (R)	Spire Motorsports	Chevrolet	13.704
Official qualifying results

== Qualifying heat races ==
Due to the incoming threat of life-threatening flooding from an atmospheric river, NASCAR moved up the Clash to Saturday night, cancelling all heat races.

=== Starting lineup ===
Pos	No.	Driver	Team	Manufacturer
1	11	Denny Hamlin	Joe Gibbs Racing	Toyota
2	22	Joey Logano	Team Penske	Ford
3	54	Ty Gibbs	Joe Gibbs Racing	Toyota
4	48	Alex Bowman	Hendrick Motorsports	Chevrolet
5	8	Kyle Busch	Richard Childress Racing	Chevrolet
6	24	William Byron	Hendrick Motorsports	Chevrolet
7	1	Ross Chastain	Trackhouse Racing	Chevrolet
8	5	Kyle Larson	Hendrick Motorsports	Chevrolet
9	23	Bubba Wallace	23XI Racing	Toyota
10	51	Justin Haley	Rick Ware Racing	Ford
11	45	Tyler Reddick	23XI Racing	Toyota
12	41	Ryan Preece	Stewart–Haas Racing	Ford
13	6	Brad Keselowski	RFK Racing	Ford
14	9	Chase Elliott	Hendrick Motorsports	Chevrolet
15	34	Michael McDowell	Front Row Motorsports	Ford
16	38	Todd Gilliland	Front Row Motorsports	Ford
17	10	Noah Gragson	Stewart–Haas Racing	Ford
18	7	Corey LaJoie	Spire Motorsports	Chevrolet
19	19	Martin Truex Jr.	Joe Gibbs Racing	Toyota
20	47	Ricky Stenhouse Jr.	JTG Daugherty Racing	Chevrolet
21	42	John Hunter Nemechek	Legacy Motor Club	Toyota
22	14	Chase Briscoe	Stewart–Haas Racing	Ford
23	12	Ryan Blaney	Team Penske	Ford
Official starting lineup

== Race ==
=== Race results ===
Pos	Grid	No	Driver	Team	Manufacturer	Laps
1	1	11	Denny Hamlin	Joe Gibbs Racing	Toyota	151
2	5	8	Kyle Busch	Richard Childress Racing	Chevrolet	151
3	23	12	Ryan Blaney	Team Penske	Ford	151
4	2	22	Joey Logano	Team Penske	Ford	151
5	8	5	Kyle Larson	Hendrick Motorsports	Chevrolet	151
6	4	48	Alex Bowman	Hendrick Motorsports	Chevrolet	151
7	22	14	Chase Briscoe	Stewart–Haas Racing	Ford	151
8	13	6	Brad Keselowski	RFK Racing	Ford	151
9	19	19	Martin Truex Jr.	Joe Gibbs Racing	Toyota	151
10	5	24	William Byron	Hendrick Motorsports	Chevrolet	151
11	12	41	Ryan Preece	Stewart–Haas Racing	Ford	151
12	9	23	Bubba Wallace	23XI Racing	Toyota	151
13	11	45	Tyler Reddick	23XI Racing	Toyota	151
14	21	42	John Hunter Nemechek	Legacy Motor Club	Toyota	150
15	7	1	Ross Chastain	Trackhouse Racing	Chevrolet	150
16	20	47	Ricky Stenhouse Jr.	JTG Daugherty Racing	Chevrolet	150
17	18	7	Corey LaJoie	Spire Motorsports	Chevrolet	150
18	3	54	Ty Gibbs	Joe Gibbs Racing	Toyota	150
19	15	34	Michael McDowell	Front Row Motorsports	Ford	149
20	17	10	Noah Gragson	Stewart–Haas Racing	Ford	147
21	10	51	Justin Haley	Rick Ware Racing	Ford	135
22	14	9	Chase Elliott	Hendrick Motorsports	Chevrolet	77
23	16	38	Todd Gilliland	Front Row Motorsports	Ford	68
Official race results

== Media ==
=== Television ===
FS1 covered the race on the television side. Mike Joy, Clint Bowyer, and three-time Clash winner Kevin Harvick handled the call in the booth for the race. Jamie Little and Regan Smith handled the pit road duties, and Larry McReynolds provided insight from the Fox Sports studio in Charlotte.

FS1
Booth announcers	Pit reporters	In-race analyst
Lap-by-lap: Mike Joy; Color-commentator: Clint Bowyer; Color-commentator: Kevin Harvick	Jamie Little; Regan Smith	Larry McReynolds

=== Radio ===
MRN covered the radio call for the race, which was also simulcast on Sirius XM NASCAR Radio. Alex Hayden and Jeff Striegle called the action from the broadcast booth when the field raced down the front straightaway. Dan Hubbard called the action for MRN when the field raced down the backstretch. Steve Post, Kim Coon, Brienne Pedigo, and Jason Toy covered the action for MRN on pit lane.

MRN Radio
Booth announcers	Turn announcers	Pit reporters
Lead announcer: Alex Hayden; Announcer: Jeff Striegle	Backstretch: Dan Hubbard	Steve Post; Kim Coon; Brienne Pedigo; Jason Toy
