= Darian Grubb =

NASCAR crew chief and technical director

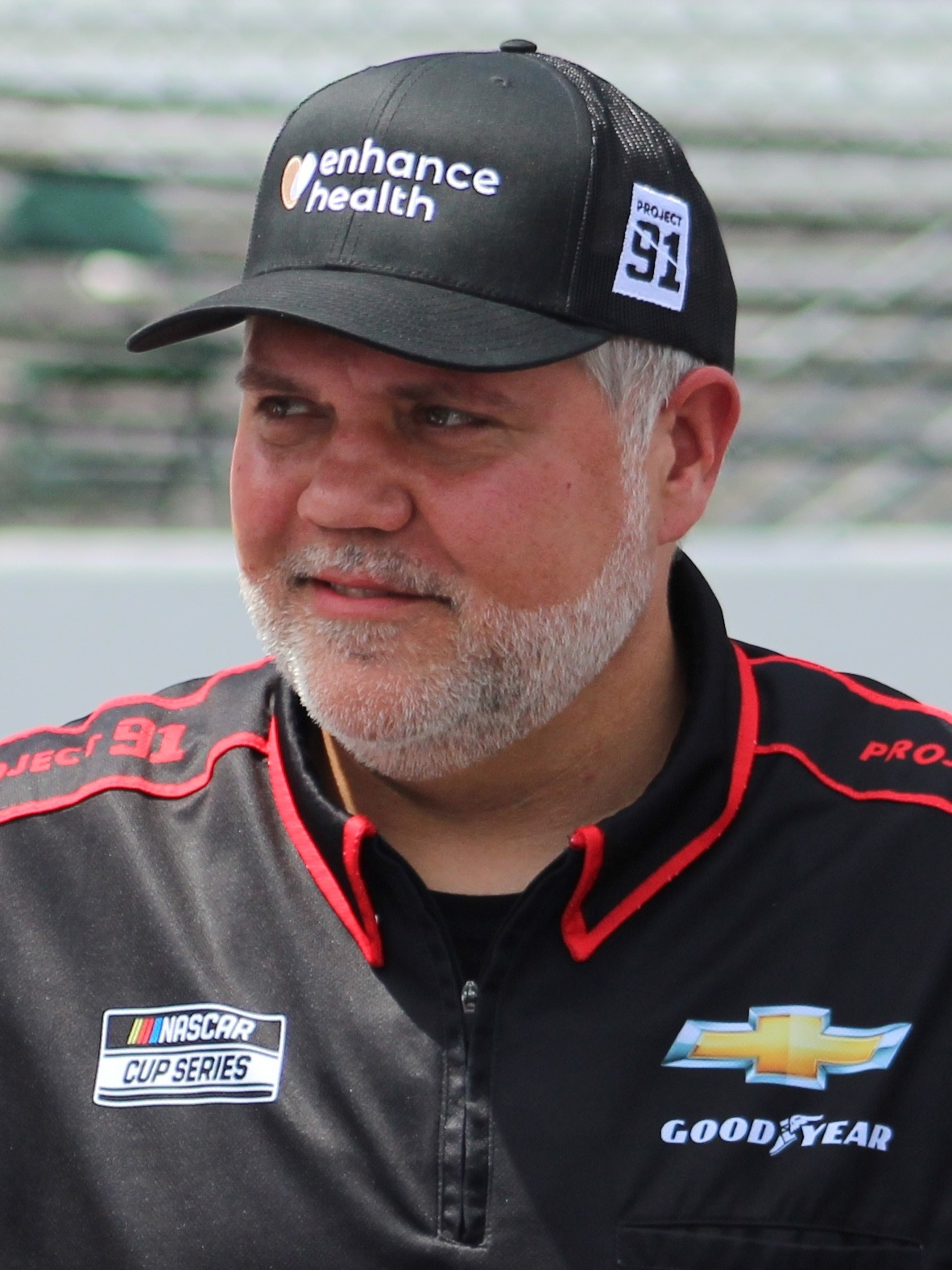
- Grubb at Indianapolis Motor Speedway in 2023

Personal information
- Born: Darian Kent Grubb; October 9, 1975 (age 50) Floyd, Virginia, U.S.

Sport
- Country: United States
- Sport: NASCAR Cup Series
- Team: 87. Trackhouse Racing

Darian Kent Grubb (born October 9, 1975) is an American NASCAR mechanic, engineer, and crew chief who is currently employed at Trackhouse Racing as the Director of Performance. He has collected 1 championship and 24 wins (including 1 Daytona 500 win) as a crew chief.

Previously, Grubb worked for Hendrick Motorsports in a technical director position in 2020, 2019, 2017 and 2016 and as a crew chief for their No. 24 of William Byron in 2018. Prior to that, he worked for Joe Gibbs Racing as a crew chief for two of their NASCAR Cup Series teams: the No. 11 of Denny Hamlin from 2012 to 2014 and the No. 19 of Carl Edwards in 2015. Prior to that, Grubb worked for Stewart–Haas Racing from 2009 to 2011 as the crew chief for team co-owner Tony Stewart, winning the Cup Series championship with him in 2011. Before that, he had another stint at Hendrick Motorsports from 2003 to 2008, starting his career as an engineer and was later the interim crew chief in 2006 for Jimmie Johnson's No. 48 after the suspension of Chad Knaus at the start of the season, where Johnson would go on to win the 2006 Daytona 500. Grubb then got his first permanent crew chiefing job in 2007, working on Hendrick's No. 25 of Casey Mears before moving into an engineering managerial role with the team in 2008.

== Early life ==
Grubb was born in Floyd, Virginia, a small town in Floyd County, which had only one stoplight and an estimated 14,000 residents. Floyd is also the birthplace and childhood home of NASCAR legend Curtis Turner. His love of racing began to develop during his time at Floyd County High School. He built Late Model stock cars that competed in races throughout Virginia and the Carolinas. Grubb made a lasting impression upon his graduation in 1993, ranking 6th in a 156-pupil class. As a senior at the Virginia Polytechnic Institute and State University (more commonly known as Virginia Tech) in 1998, Grubb was influential in the design of the school's "Tinker Bell" ATV used in competition. He graduated with a mechanical engineering degree that year through a co-op program with Volvo Trucks and General Motors. Grubb quoted this about his association with the co-op program:

"That was a really good program. I worked within Volvo Heavy Trucks for the first four years [of college]. I was basically able to do five years of college with alternating semesters, so I got a year-and-a-half of work experience by the time I graduated. I was a junior design engineer and worked with people designing truck interiors - seats, dashes and all the integral parts of the interior of tractor-trailer rigs. My senior year [in college] I went to General Motors and worked on the Cadillac program that summer, basically working on mechanical systems, warranty reduction and power-steering systems. That was a good experience for me because it was my first time to actually move out of state and I got a chance to work with one of the Big Three auto companies."

== Racing career ==
=== 2003–2008: Hendrick Motorsports (first stint) ===
Grubb spent four years as an engineer with Hendrick Motorsports, before taking over the crew chief job temporarily for Jimmie Johnson's team at the 2006 Daytona 500, after regular crew chief Chad Knaus was suspended. Johnson went on to win that race for his first Daytona 500 victory. Johnson and Grubb went on to finish second at the 2006 Auto Club 500. Johnson won two weeks later, again with Grubb, in the 2006 UAW-DaimlerChrysler 400. In 2007, he was named the crew chief for Casey Mears' No. 25 Hendrick team, where he scored another win, at the Coca-Cola 600. For the 2008 season, Grubb moved to an administrative role with Hendrick Motorsports, supervising the No. 5 and the renumbered No. 88 teams.

=== 2009–2011: Stewart–Haas Racing ===
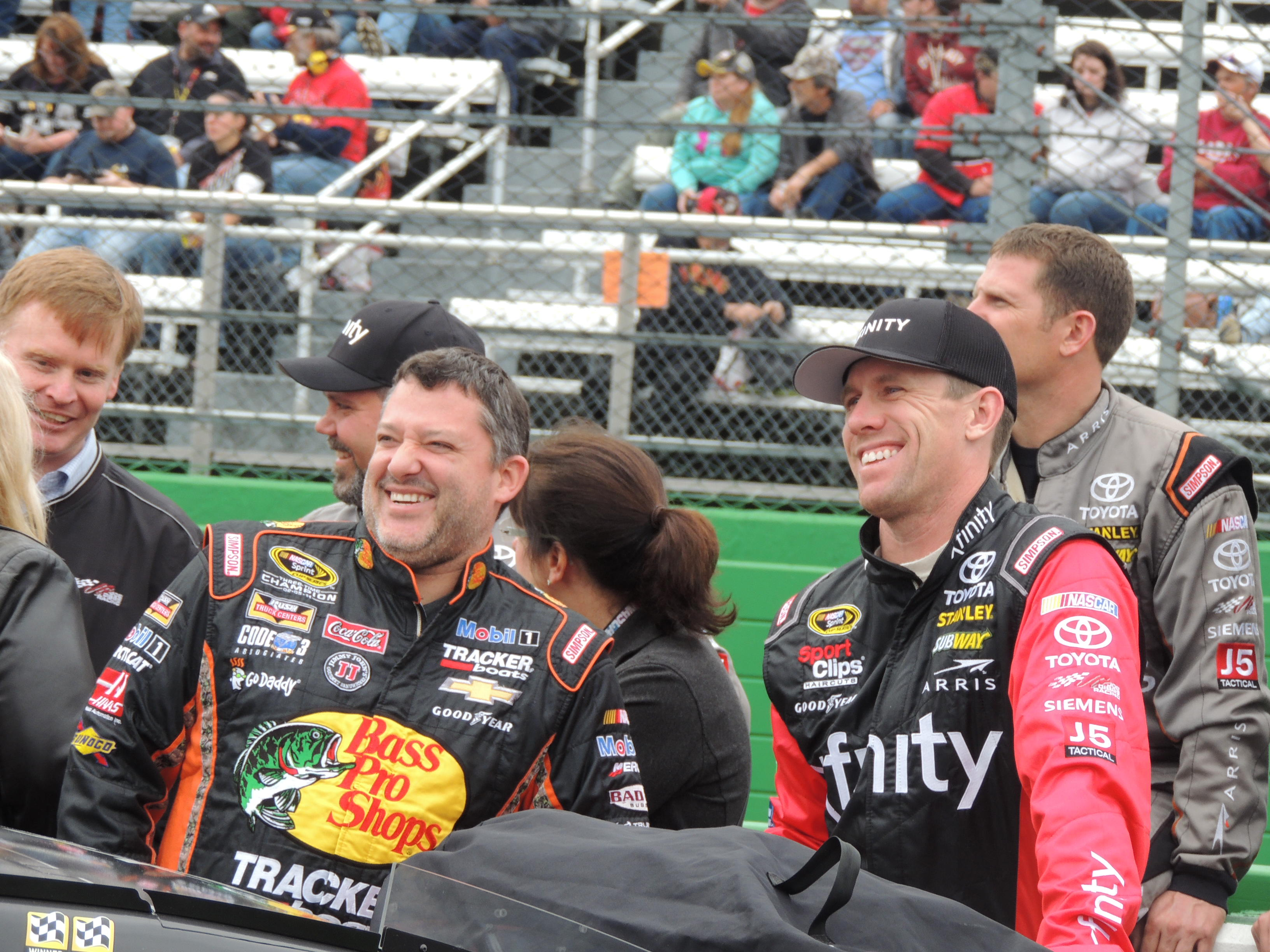
Grubb behind Tony Stewart before the race at Martinsville in November 2015. He has crew chiefed both Stewart (left) and Carl Edwards (right).

On September 5, 2008, it was announced that Grubb would be leaving Hendrick Motorsports at the end of the season to join the new Stewart–Haas Racing team to serve as Tony Stewart's crew chief in 2009. Their first win together came at the All-Star Race at Charlotte Motor Speedway. Grubb also guided Stewart to his first points race win as an owner/driver at the 2009 Pocono 500. During the 2011 season, Grubb led Stewart from a mediocre pre-chase effort to five chase victories and Stewart's third NASCAR Cup Championship by way of a 5-1 victory tiebreaker over Carl Edwards that NASCAR used in the event of a tie in the points standings at the end of the season. This was Grubb's first championship. However, Grubb announced that he had been informed of his release prior to the fall Charlotte race.

=== 2012–2015: Joe Gibbs Racing ===
Grubb joined Joe Gibbs Racing and became the crew chief for Denny Hamlin and the No. 11 team in 2012, replacing Mike Ford. On July 29, 2014, Grubb was suspended six races for tampered firewall covers, which could lead to more downforce, during the Brickyard 400. JGR shook up their crew chief lineup for 2015, and Grubb moved from Hamlin's No. 11 to JGR's upstart fourth Cup Series car, the No. 19, driven by Carl Edwards. Ironically, this meant that Grubb was now crew chiefing the driver who Stewart (who was crew chiefed by Grubb) barely beat to win the 2011 championship.

=== 2016–2020: Hendrick Motorsports (second stint) ===
In 2016, Grubb returned to Hendrick Motorsports to become the vehicle production director, which oversees chassis manufacturing. In 2017, he was named crew chief for the No. 5 car of Kasey Kahne for the last 9 races of the season starting at New Hampshire.

On November 1, 2017, it was announced that Grubb would be the crew chief for William Byron for the 2018 Monster Energy NASCAR Cup Series season. On October 10, 2018, Hendrick Motorsports announced that Grubb would return to a technical director position while Knaus takes over crew chief duties for the No. 24 in 2019.

=== 2021–present: Chip Ganassi Racing, Trackhouse Racing, and Kaulig Racing ===
In 2021, Grubb left Hendrick again and went to Chip Ganassi Racing as their Director of Performance. The position was a subordinate to CGR's team manager, Tony Lunders. When CGR sold their NASCAR team to Trackhouse Racing after the end of that year, Grubb continued in the same role for Trackhouse. On May 26, 2022, Trackhouse announced that Grubb would crew chief the team's new part-time third car, the No. 91, driven by Kimi Räikkönen in the race at Watkins Glen. He would return at Circuit of the Americas with Räikkönen in 2023. He would also lead Shane van Gisbergen to his first career Cup Series win in his debut at the Chicago Street Course.

On October 16, 2024, Grubb was the interim crew chief of the No. 16 car for Kaulig Racing (a team with an alliance with Trackhouse) No. 16 in the fall Cup Series race at Las Vegas after the team parted ways with Travis Mack. Grubb was also the interim crew chief of Trackhouse's No. 1 car driven by Ross Chastain in the 2024 season-finale at Phoenix after Phil Surgen was suspended due to the team being a part of the Chevrolet race manipulation at Martinsville the previous weekend.

On January 6, 2025, it was announced that Grubb would crew chief the Trackhouse No. 91 at the Daytona 500 with Hélio Castroneves. On February 24, it was announced that Grubb would crew chief Trackhouse's No. 87 at the EchoPark Automotive Grand Prix with Connor Zilisch.
