= Travis Mack =

NASCAR crew chief

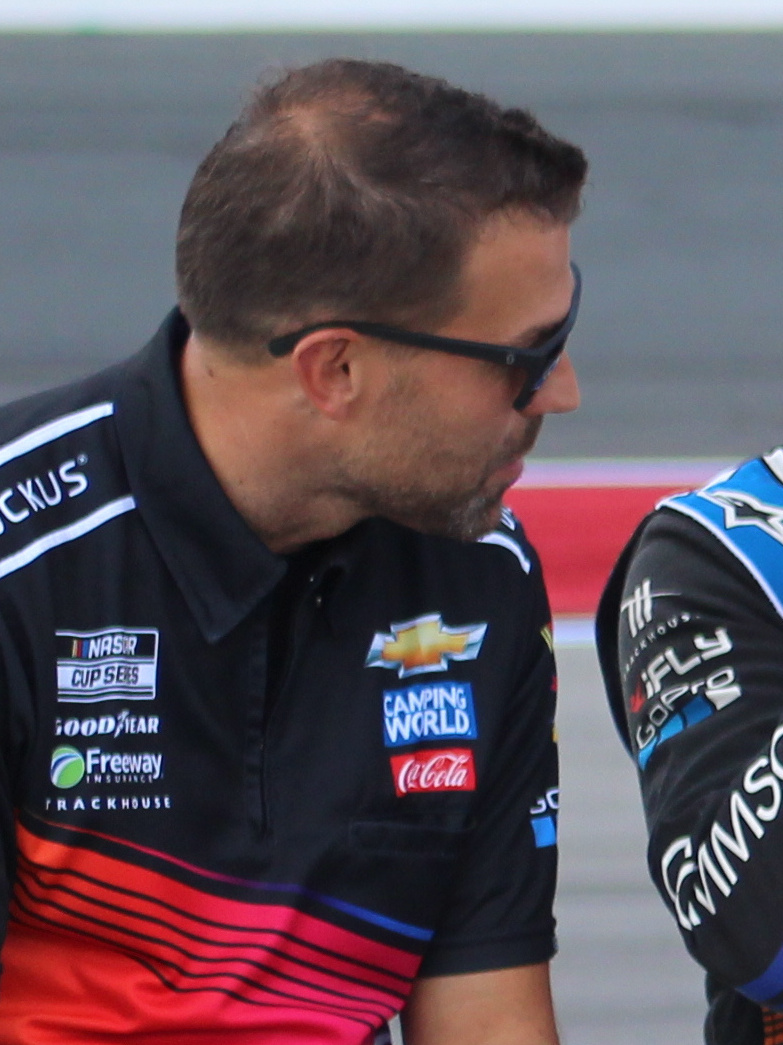
- Mack at Charlotte Motor Speedway in 2021

Personal information
- Born: Travis Steven Mack; April 15, 1983 (age 43) Louisville, Kentucky, U.S.
- Education: University of Louisville
- Years active: 2001–present

Sport
- Sport: NASCAR Cup Series
- Position: Crew chief

Travis Steven Mack (born April 15, 1983) is an American NASCAR crew chief, most recently for Legacy Motor Club of their No. 42/40 Toyota Camry XSE in the NASCAR Cup Series driven by John Hunter Nemechek. He also previously worked as a crew chief for Trackhouse Racing, JR Motorsports, Leavine Family Racing and Kaulig Racing as well as a pit crew member for Hendrick Motorsports and Clement Racing.

== Racing career ==
After graduating from Louisville Male High School and the University of Louisville, Mack began his career as a mechanic on Frank Kimmel's ARCA team, Clement Racing, winning three championships with him, before joining Hendrick Motorsports in 2004 as a shock specialist and front-end mechanic. He moved over to JR Motorsports (Hendrick's Xfinity Series affiliate) in 2013, working on the No. 7 car of Regan Smith, and was reassigned in 2014 as the car chief of the No. 9 car, where he was a part of Chase Elliott's championship-winning team. He rejoined Hendrick Motorsports in 2015 as the car chief for Dale Earnhardt Jr.'s No. 88 car in the Cup Series, moving up with crew chief Greg Ives, who replaced Steve Letarte as Jr's crew chief when Letarte left to become a color commentator for NASCAR on NBC. Mack would also serve as the No. 88 car's interim crew chief for one race in 2017 when Ives was suspended.

In 2018, Mack got his first permanent crew chiefing job with Leavine Family Racing as the crew chief of their No. 95 car in the Cup Series, which was driven by Kasey Kahne, who Mack worked alongside at Hendrick the previous year. Over the summer, he left LFR to return to JRM as the crew chief of Michael Annett's No. 5 car in the Xfinity Series starting at Watkins Glen. Annett had struggled that year and in 2017 compared to his teammates under crew chief Jason Stockert, who was reassigned to another job at JRM.

In 2019, Mack and Annett moved over to JRM's No. 1 car after the retirement of Elliott Sadler and his crew chief Kevin Meendering becoming the crew chief of Jimmie Johnson's No. 48 car for Hendrick in the Cup Series that year as well as when JRM dropped the No. 5 car number after getting the No. 8 from B. J. McLeod Motorsports. The duo remained together in 2020.

In 2021, Mack left JRM to return to the Cup Series as the crew chief for the new Trackhouse Racing on their No. 99 car driven by Daniel Suárez. He and Suárez won their first Cup Series races as driver and crew chief in 2022 in the race at Sonoma, which qualified the team for the playoffs. They would be eliminated after the Round of 12 and would finish tenth in the final standings that year.

After Suárez did not win a race and missed the playoffs in 2023 while his teammate Ross Chastain did, Trackhouse and Kaulig Racing made a deal to have Mack and Matt Swiderski, the crew chief of Kaulig's No. 16 Cup Series car, switch teams for 2024. Swiderski would become Suárez's new crew chief at Trackhouse and Mack would go to Kaulig to crew chief the No. 16 car. Mack would also become the technical director for the entire Kaulig team in addition to his crew chief responsibilities. On October 16, Mack left the team. Darian Grubb replaced him as crew chief of the No. 16 at Las Vegas.

On November 19, 2024, Mack was announced as the crew chief for John Hunter Nemechek beginning in 2025. He was released on September 17, 2026.
