= 2026 Iowa Corn 350 =

NASCAR stock car race held in Indianapolis, Indiana, U.S.

Race details
- Race 23 of 36 in the 2026 NASCAR Cup Series
- Date: August 9, 2026
- Location: Iowa Speedway in Newton, Iowa
- Course: Permanent racing facility
- Course length: 0.875 miles (1.408 km)
- Distance: 350 laps, 306.25 mi (492.862 km)
- Average speed: 103.337 miles per hour (166.305 km/h)

Pole position
Driver	Ryan Blaney	Team Penske
- Time: 23.474

Most laps led
Driver	Ryan Blaney	Team Penske
- Laps: 129

Fastest lap
Driver	Christopher Bell	Joe Gibbs Racing
- Time: 24.158

Winner
No. 54	Ty Gibbs	Joe Gibbs Racing

Television in the United States
- Network: USA
- Announcers: Leigh Diffey, Jeff Burton, and Steve Letarte
- Nielsen ratings: 1.929 million

Radio in the United States
- Radio: MRN
- Booth announcers: Alex Hayden, Mike Bagley and Todd Gordon
- Turn announcers: Dave Moody (1 & 2) and Kurt Becker (3 & 4)

The 2026 Iowa Corn 350 was a NASCAR Cup Series race held on August 9, 2026, at Iowa Speedway in Newton, Iowa. Contested over 350 laps on the 0.875-mile (1.408 km) oval, it was the 23rd race for the 2026 NASCAR Cup Series season.

Ty Gibbs won the race. Christopher Bell finished 2nd, and Ryan Blaney finished 3rd. Josh Berry and Denny Hamlin rounded out the top five, and Chase Briscoe, Ross Chastain, A. J. Allmendinger, William Byron, and Austin Dillon rounded out the top ten.

== Report ==
=== Background ===
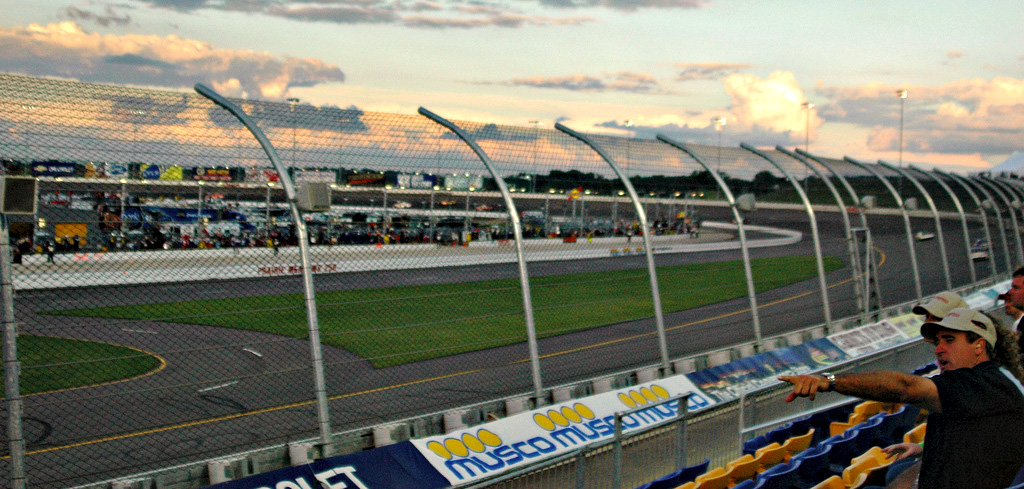
Iowa Speedway, the track where the race was held.

Iowa Speedway is a 7/8-mile (1.4 km) paved oval motor racing track in Newton, Iowa, United States, approximately 30 miles (48 km) east of Des Moines. The track was designed with influence from Rusty Wallace and patterned after Richmond Raceway, a short track where Wallace was very successful. It has over 25,000 permanent seats as well as a unique multi-tiered Recreational Vehicle viewing area along the backstretch. The track hosts the NTT IndyCar Series and NASCAR events.

After the 2020 race was canceled due to the pandemic, the race was removed from the 2021 schedule. In 2024, it was announced that the Xfinity Series would return to Iowa with a Cup Series race.

==== Entry list ====
- (R) denotes rookie driver.
- (i) denotes driver who is ineligible for series driver points.

No.	Driver	Team	Manufacturer
1	Ross Chastain	Trackhouse Racing	Chevrolet
2	Austin Cindric	Team Penske	Ford
3	Austin Dillon	Richard Childress Racing	Chevrolet
4	Noah Gragson	Front Row Motorsports	Ford
5	Kyle Larson	Hendrick Motorsports	Chevrolet
6	Brad Keselowski	RFK Racing	Ford
7	Daniel Suárez	Spire Motorsports	Chevrolet
9	Chase Elliott	Hendrick Motorsports	Chevrolet
10	Ty Dillon	Kaulig Racing	Chevrolet
11	Denny Hamlin	Joe Gibbs Racing	Toyota
12	Ryan Blaney	Team Penske	Ford
16	A. J. Allmendinger	Kaulig Racing	Chevrolet
17	Chris Buescher	RFK Racing	Ford
19	Chase Briscoe	Joe Gibbs Racing	Toyota
20	Christopher Bell	Joe Gibbs Racing	Toyota
21	Josh Berry	Wood Brothers Racing	Ford
22	Joey Logano	Team Penske	Ford
23	Bubba Wallace	23XI Racing	Toyota
24	William Byron	Hendrick Motorsports	Chevrolet
33	Austin Hill (i)	Richard Childress Racing	Chevrolet
34	Todd Gilliland	Front Row Motorsports	Ford
35	Riley Herbst	23XI Racing	Toyota
38	Zane Smith	Front Row Motorsports	Ford
41	Cole Custer	Haas Factory Team	Ford
42	John Hunter Nemechek	Legacy Motor Club	Toyota
43	Erik Jones	Legacy Motor Club	Toyota
45	Tyler Reddick	23XI Racing	Toyota
47	Ricky Stenhouse Jr.	Hyak Motorsports	Chevrolet
48	Alex Bowman	Hendrick Motorsports	Chevrolet
51	Cody Ware	Rick Ware Racing	Ford
54	Ty Gibbs	Joe Gibbs Racing	Toyota
60	Ryan Preece	RFK Racing	Ford
71	Michael McDowell	Spire Motorsports	Chevrolet
77	Carson Hocevar	Spire Motorsports	Chevrolet
88	Connor Zilisch (R)	Trackhouse Racing	Chevrolet
97	Shane van Gisbergen	Trackhouse Racing	Chevrolet
Official entry list

== Practice ==
Erik Jones was the fastest in the practice session with a time of 23.710 seconds and a speed of 132.855 mph (213.809 km/h).

=== Practice results ===
Pos	No.	Driver	Team	Manufacturer	Time	Speed
1	43	Erik Jones	Legacy Motor Club	Toyota	23.710	132.855
2	54	Ty Gibbs	Joe Gibbs Racing	Toyota	23.766	132.542
3	2	Austin Cindric	Team Penske	Ford	23.778	132.475
Official practice results

== Qualifying ==
Ryan Blaney scored the pole for the race with a time of 23.474 and a speed of 134.191 mph (215.959 km/h).

=== Qualifying results ===
Pos	No.	Driver	Team	Manufacturer	Time	Speed
1	12	Ryan Blaney	Team Penske	Ford	23.474	134.191
2	5	Kyle Larson	Hendrick Motorsports	Chevrolet	23.492	134.088
3	22	Joey Logano	Team Penske	Ford	23.492	134.088
4	6	Brad Keselowski	RFK Racing	Ford	23.503	134.025
5	45	Tyler Reddick	23XI Racing	Toyota	23.523	133.911
6	54	Ty Gibbs	Joe Gibbs Racing	Toyota	23.543	133.786
7	3	Austin Dillon	Richard Childress Racing	Chevrolet	23.545	133.786
8	88	Connor Zilisch (R)	Trackhouse Racing	Chevrolet	23.550	133.758
9	1	Ross Chastain	Trackhouse Racing	Chevrolet	23.566	133.667
10	43	Erik Jones	Legacy Motor Club	Toyota	23.595	133.503
11	71	Michael McDowell	Spire Motorsports	Chevrolet	23.598	133.486
12	2	Austin Cindric	Team Penske	Ford	23.599	133.480
13	21	Josh Berry	Wood Brothers Racing	Ford	23.602	133.463
14	38	Zane Smith	Front Row Motorsports	Ford	23.617	133.378
15	4	Noah Gragson	Front Row Motorsports	Ford	23.625	133.333
16	47	Ricky Stenhouse Jr.	Hyak Motorsports	Chevrolet	23.643	133.232
17	34	Todd Gilliland	Front Row Motorsports	Ford	23.653	133.175
18	77	Carson Hocevar	Spire Motorsports	Chevrolet	23.655	133.164
19	24	William Byron	Hendrick Motorsports	Chevrolet	23.662	133.125
20	19	Chase Briscoe	Joe Gibbs Racing	Toyota	23.663	133.119
21	42	John Hunter Nemechek	Legacy Motor Club	Toyota	23.663	133.119
22	20	Christopher Bell	Joe Gibbs Racing	Toyota	23.674	133.057
23	97	Shane van Gisbergen	Trackhouse Racing	Chevrolet	23.682	133.012
24	33	Austin Hill (i)	Richard Childress Racing	Chevrolet	23.687	132.984
25	16	A. J. Allmendinger	Kaulig Racing	Chevrolet	23.701	132.906
26	23	Bubba Wallace	23XI Racing	Toyota	23.709	132.861
27	17	Chris Buescher	RFK Racing	Ford	23.718	132.811
28	35	Riley Herbst	23XI Racing	Toyota	23.729	132.749
29	11	Denny Hamlin	Joe Gibbs Racing	Toyota	23.762	132.565
30	48	Alex Bowman	Hendrick Motorsports	Chevrolet	23.777	132.481
31	10	Ty Dillon	Kaulig Racing	Chevrolet	23.802	132.342
32	9	Chase Elliott	Hendrick Motorsports	Chevrolet	23.819	132.247
33	7	Daniel Suárez	Spire Motorsports	Chevrolet	23.848	132.087
34	51	Cody Ware	Rick Ware Racing	Chevrolet	23.870	131.965
35	60	Ryan Preece	RFK Racing	Ford	23.964	131.447
36	41	Cole Custer	Haas Factory Team	Chevrolet	24.004	131.228
Official qualifying results

== Race ==
=== Race results ===
==== Stage Results ====
Stage One Laps: 70

Pos	No	Driver	Team	Manufacturer	Points
1	12	Ryan Blaney	Team Penske	Ford	10
2	22	Joey Logano	Team Penske	Ford	9
3	5	Kyle Larson	Hendrick Motorsports	Chevrolet	8
4	54	Ty Gibbs	Joe Gibbs Racing	Toyota	7
5	3	Austin Dillon	Richard Childress Racing	Chevrolet	6
6	1	Ross Chastain	Trackhouse Racing	Chevrolet	5
7	20	Christopher Bell	Joe Gibbs Racing	Toyota	4
8	19	Chase Briscoe	Joe Gibbs Racing	Toyota	3
9	88	Connor Zilisch (R)	Trackhouse Racing	Chevrolet	2
10	38	Zane Smith	Front Row Motorsports	Ford	1

Stage Two Laps: 140

Pos	No	Driver	Team	Manufacturer	Points
1	20	Christopher Bell	Joe Gibbs Racing	Toyota	10
2	22	Joey Logano	Team Penske	Ford	9
3	1	Ross Chastain	Trackhouse Racing	Chevrolet	8
4	54	Ty Gibbs	Joe Gibbs Racing	Toyota	7
5	19	Chase Briscoe	Joe Gibbs Racing	Toyota	6
6	11	Denny Hamlin	Joe Gibbs Racing	Toyota	5
7	24	William Byron	Hendrick Motorsports	Chevrolet	4
8	12	Ryan Blaney	Team Penske	Ford	3
9	38	Zane Smith	Front Row Motorsports	Ford	2
10	88	Connor Zilisch (R)	Trackhouse Racing	Chevrolet	1

=== Final Stage Results ===
Stage Three Laps: 140

Pos	Grid	No	Driver	Team	Manufacturer	Laps	Points
1	6	54	Ty Gibbs	Joe Gibbs Racing	Toyota	350	69
2	22	20	Christopher Bell	Joe Gibbs Racing	Toyota	350	50
3	1	12	Ryan Blaney	Team Penske	Ford	350	47
4	13	21	Josh Berry	Wood Brothers Racing	Ford	350	33
5	29	11	Denny Hamlin	Joe Gibbs Racing	Toyota	350	37
6	20	19	Chase Briscoe	Joe Gibbs Racing	Toyota	350	40
7	9	1	Ross Chastain	Trackhouse Racing	Chevrolet	350	43
8	25	16	A. J. Allmendinger	Kaulig Racing	Chevrolet	350	29
9	19	24	William Byron	Hendrick Motorsports	Chevrolet	350	32
10	7	3	Austin Dillon	Richard Childress Racing	Chevrolet	350	33
11	8	88	Connor Zilisch (R)	Trackhouse Racing	Chevrolet	349	29
12	26	23	Bubba Wallace	23XI Racing	Toyota	349	25
13	27	17	Chris Buescher	RFK Racing	Ford	349	24
14	3	22	Joey Logano	Team Penske	Ford	349	41
15	32	9	Chase Elliott	Hendrick Motorsports	Chevrolet	349	22
16	14	38	Zane Smith	Front Row Motorsports	Ford	349	24
17	15	4	Noah Gragson	Front Row Motorsports	Ford	349	20
18	16	47	Ricky Stenhouse Jr.	Hyak Motorsports	Chevrolet	349	19
19	21	42	John Hunter Nemechek	Legacy Motor Club	Toyota	349	18
20	35	60	Ryan Preece	RFK Racing	Ford	349	17
21	28	35	Riley Herbst	23XI Racing	Toyota	349	16
22	17	34	Todd Gilliland	Front Row Motorsports	Ford	349	15
23	33	7	Daniel Suárez	Spire Motorsports	Chevrolet	349	14
24	31	10	Ty Dillon	Kaulig Racing	Chevrolet	349	13
25	11	71	Michael McDowell	Spire Motorsports	Chevrolet	349	12
26	24	33	Austin Hill (i)	Richard Childress Racing	Chevrolet	349	0
27	4	6	Brad Keselowski	RFK Racing	Ford	348	10
28	36	41	Cole Custer	Haas Racing Team	Chevrolet	348	9
29	12	2	Austin Cindric	Team Penske	Ford	348	8
30	23	97	Shane van Gisbergen	Trackhouse Racing	Chevrolet	347	7
31	18	77	Carson Hocevar	Spire Motorsports	Chevrolet	347	6
32	34	51	Cody Ware	Rick Ware Racing	Chevrolet	347	5
33	2	5	Kyle Larson	Hendrick Motorsports	Chevrolet	332	12
34	30	48	Alex Bowman	Hendrick Motorsports	Chevrolet	194	3
35	10	43	Erik Jones	Legacy Motor Club	Toyota	3	2
36	5	45	Tyler Reddick	23XI Racing	Toyota	3	1
Official race results

=== Race statistics ===
- Lead changes: 9 among 6 different drivers
- Cautions/Laps: 7 for 45
- Red flags: 0
- Time of race: 2 hours, 57 minutes and 49 seconds
- Average speed: 103.337 miles per hour (166.305 km/h)

== Media ==
=== Television ===
USA covered the race on the television side. Leigh Diffey, Jeff Burton, and Steve Letarte called the race from the broadcast booth. Dave Burns, Kim Coon and Marty Snider handled pit road, while Trevor Bayne provided analysis from the pace car for the television side.

USA
Booth announcers	Pit reporters	Pace car
Lap-by-lap: Leigh Diffey; Color-commentator: Jeff Burton; Color-commentator: Steve Letarte	Dave Burns; Kim Coon; Marty Snider	Trevor Bayne

=== Radio ===
Radio coverage of the race was broadcast by Motor Racing Network (MRN) and was also simulcast on Sirius XM NASCAR Radio.

MRN
Booth announcers	Turn announcers	Pit reporters
Lead announcer: Alex Hayden; Announcer: Mike Bagley; Announcer: Todd Gordon	Turns 1–2: Dave Moody; Turns 3–4: Kurt Becker	Steve Post; Jacklyn Drake; Jason Toy

== Standings after the race ==
Drivers' Championship standings

	Pos	Driver	Points
	1	Denny Hamlin	923
2	2	Ty Gibbs	820 (–103)
	3	Ryan Blaney	813 (–110)
2	4	Tyler Reddick	803 (–120)
2	5	Chase Briscoe	663 (–260)
4	6	Christopher Bell	659 (–264)
1	7	Chase Elliott	657 (–266)
3	8	Carson Hocevar	644 (–279)
	9	Chris Buescher	637 (–286)
2	10	Kyle Larson	629 (–294)
1	11	William Byron	600 (–323)
1	12	Daniel Suárez	597 (–326)
	13	Joey Logano	586 (–337)
	14	Bubba Wallace	565 (–358)
	15	Shane van Gisbergen	544 (–379)
	16	Austin Cindric	526 (–397)
Official driver's standings

Manufacturers' Championship standings

Pos	Manufacturer	Points
1	Toyota	1,072
2	Chevrolet	896 (–176)
3	Ford	800 (–272)

- Note: Only the first 16 positions are included for the driver standings.

Previous race: 2026 Brickyard 400	NASCAR Cup Series; 2026 season	Next race: 2026 Cook Out 400 (Richmond)
