= 2025 Iowa Corn 350 =

NASCAR Cup Series race

2025 Iowa Corn 350 powered by Ethanol
Race details
- Race 23 of 36 in the 2025 NASCAR Cup Series
- Date: August 3, 2025
- Location: Iowa Speedway in Newton, Iowa
- Course: Permanent racing facility
- Course length: 0.875 miles (1.408 km)
- Distance: 350 laps, 306.25 mi (492.862 km)
- Average speed: 92.905 miles per hour (149.516 km/h)

Pole position
Driver	Chase Briscoe	Joe Gibbs Racing
- Time: 23.004

Most laps led
Driver	William Byron	Hendrick Motorsports
- Laps: 140

Fastest lap
Driver	Brad Keselowski	RFK Racing
- Time: 23.748

Winner
No. 24	William Byron	Hendrick Motorsports

Television in the United States
- Network: USA
- Announcers: Leigh Diffey, Jeff Burton and Steve Letarte
- Nielsen ratings: 2.2 million

Radio in the United States
- Radio: MRN
- Booth announcers: Alex Hayden and Mike Bagley
- Turn announcers: Dave Moody (1 & 2) and Kurt Becker (3 & 4)

The 2025 Iowa Corn 350 was a NASCAR Cup Series race held on August 3, 2025, at Iowa Speedway in Newton, Iowa. Contested over 350 laps on the 0.875-mile (1.408 km) D-shaped oval, it was the 23rd race of the 2025 NASCAR Cup Series season.

William Byron won the race. Chase Briscoe finished 2nd, and Brad Keselowski finished 3rd. Ryan Blaney and Ryan Preece rounded out the top five, and Bubba Wallace, Alex Bowman, Carson Hocevar, Joey Logano, and Austin Dillon rounded out the top ten.

== Report ==
=== Background ===
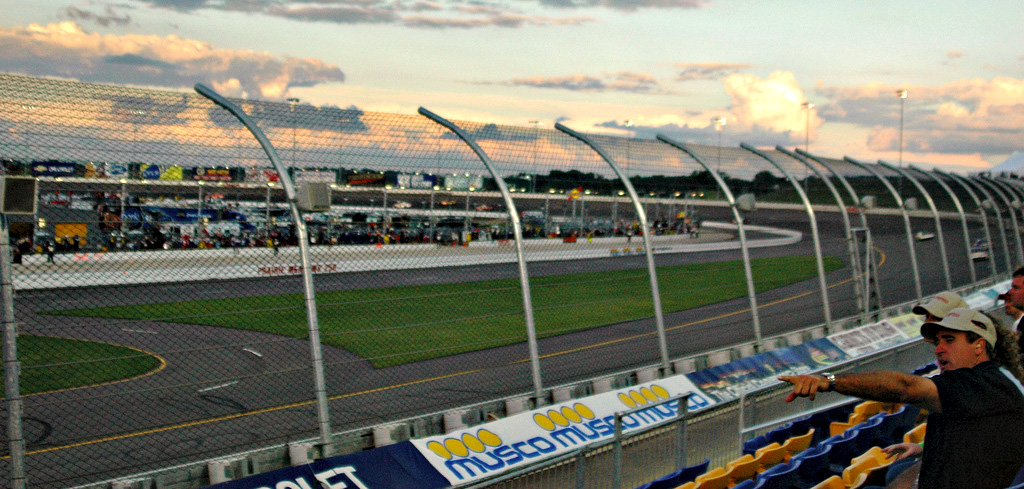
Iowa Speedway, the track where the race was held.

Iowa Speedway is a 7/8-mile (1.4 km) paved oval motor racing track in Newton, Iowa, United States, approximately 30 miles (48 km) east of Des Moines. The track was designed with influence from Rusty Wallace and patterned after Richmond Raceway, a short track where Wallace was very successful. It has over 25,000 permanent seats as well as a unique multi-tiered Recreational Vehicle viewing area along the backstretch. The track hosts the NTT IndyCar Series and NASCAR events.

After the 2020 race was canceled due to the pandemic, the race was removed from the 2021 schedule. In 2024, it was announced that the Xfinity Series would return to Iowa with a Cup Series race.

==== Entry list ====
- (R) denotes rookie driver.
- (i) denotes driver who is ineligible for series driver points.

No.	Driver	Team	Manufacturer
1	Ross Chastain	Trackhouse Racing	Chevrolet
2	Austin Cindric	Team Penske	Ford
3	Austin Dillon	Richard Childress Racing	Chevrolet
4	Noah Gragson	Front Row Motorsports	Ford
5	Kyle Larson	Hendrick Motorsports	Chevrolet
6	Brad Keselowski	RFK Racing	Ford
7	Justin Haley	Spire Motorsports	Chevrolet
8	Kyle Busch	Richard Childress Racing	Chevrolet
9	Chase Elliott	Hendrick Motorsports	Chevrolet
10	Ty Dillon	Kaulig Racing	Chevrolet
11	Denny Hamlin	Joe Gibbs Racing	Toyota
12	Ryan Blaney	Team Penske	Ford
16	A. J. Allmendinger	Kaulig Racing	Chevrolet
17	Chris Buescher	RFK Racing	Ford
19	Chase Briscoe	Joe Gibbs Racing	Toyota
20	Christopher Bell	Joe Gibbs Racing	Toyota
21	Josh Berry	Wood Brothers Racing	Ford
22	Joey Logano	Team Penske	Ford
23	Bubba Wallace	23XI Racing	Toyota
24	William Byron	Hendrick Motorsports	Chevrolet
34	Todd Gilliland	Front Row Motorsports	Ford
35	Riley Herbst (R)	23XI Racing	Toyota
38	Zane Smith	Front Row Motorsports	Ford
41	Cole Custer	Haas Factory Team	Ford
42	John Hunter Nemechek	Legacy Motor Club	Toyota
43	Erik Jones	Legacy Motor Club	Toyota
45	Tyler Reddick	23XI Racing	Toyota
47	Ricky Stenhouse Jr.	Hyak Motorsports	Chevrolet
48	Alex Bowman	Hendrick Motorsports	Chevrolet
51	Cody Ware	Rick Ware Racing	Ford
54	Ty Gibbs	Joe Gibbs Racing	Toyota
60	Ryan Preece	RFK Racing	Ford
66	Joey Gase (i)	Garage 66	Ford
71	Michael McDowell	Spire Motorsports	Chevrolet
77	Carson Hocevar	Spire Motorsports	Chevrolet
88	Shane van Gisbergen (R)	Trackhouse Racing	Chevrolet
99	Daniel Suárez	Trackhouse Racing	Chevrolet
Official entry list

== Practice ==
Christopher Bell was the fastest in the practice session with a time of 23.511 seconds and a speed of 133.979 mph (215.618 km/h).

=== Practice results ===
Pos	No.	Driver	Team	Manufacturer	Time	Speed
1	20	Christopher Bell	Joe Gibbs Racing	Toyota	23.511	133.979
2	23	Bubba Wallace	23XI Racing	Toyota	23.526	133.894
3	19	Chase Briscoe	Joe Gibbs Racing	Toyota	23.546	133.780
Official practice results

== Qualifying ==
Chase Briscoe scored the pole for the race with a time 23.004 of and a speed of 136.933 mph (220.372 km/h).

=== Qualifying results ===
Pos	No.	Driver	Team	Manufacturer	Time	Speed
1	19	Chase Briscoe	Joe Gibbs Racing	Toyota	23.004	136.933
2	24	William Byron	Hendrick Motorsports	Chevrolet	23.088	136.435
3	5	Kyle Larson	Hendrick Motorsports	Chevrolet	23.089	136.429
4	2	Austin Cindric	Team Penske	Ford	23.101	136.358
5	6	Brad Keselowski	RFK Racing	Ford	23.119	136.252
6	12	Ryan Blaney	Team Penske	Ford	23.151	136.063
7	77	Carson Hocevar	Spire Motorsports	Chevrolet	23.159	136.016
8	9	Chase Elliott	Hendrick Motorsports	Chevrolet	23.165	135.981
9	16	A. J. Allmendinger	Kaulig Racing	Chevrolet	23.174	135.928
10	7	Justin Haley	Spire Motorsports	Chevrolet	23.198	135.788
11	11	Denny Hamlin	Joe Gibbs Racing	Toyota	23.219	135.665
12	21	Josh Berry	Wood Brothers Racing	Ford	23.230	135.601
13	71	Michael McDowell	Spire Motorsports	Chevrolet	23.238	135.554
14	22	Joey Logano	Team Penske	Ford	23.245	135.513
15	23	Bubba Wallace	23XI Racing	Toyota	23.247	135.501
16	48	Alex Bowman	Hendrick Motorsports	Chevrolet	23.255	135.455
17	20	Christopher Bell	Joe Gibbs Racing	Toyota	23.268	135.379
18	3	Austin Dillon	Richard Childress Racing	Chevrolet	23.271	135.362
19	41	Cole Custer	Haas Factory Team	Ford	23.286	135.274
20	54	Ty Gibbs	Joe Gibbs Racing	Toyota	23.306	135.158
21	88	Shane van Gisbergen (R)	Trackhouse Racing	Chevrolet	23.308	135.147
22	45	Tyler Reddick	23XI Racing	Toyota	23.322	135.066
23	38	Zane Smith	Front Row Motorsports	Ford	23.338	134.973
24	35	Riley Herbst (R)	23XI Racing	Toyota	23.363	134.829
25	43	Erik Jones	Legacy Motor Club	Toyota	23.365	134.817
26	99	Daniel Suárez	Trackhouse Racing	Chevrolet	23.396	134.638
27	17	Chris Buescher	RFK Racing	Ford	23.398	134.627
28	1	Ross Chastain	Trackhouse Racing	Chevrolet	23.402	134.604
29	42	John Hunter Nemechek	Legacy Motor Club	Toyota	23.439	134.391
30	47	Ricky Stenhouse Jr.	Hyak Motorsports	Chevrolet	23.459	134.277
31	4	Noah Gragson	Front Row Motorsports	Ford	23.509	133.991
32	10	Ty Dillon	Kaulig Racing	Chevrolet	23.526	133.894
33	60	Ryan Preece	RFK Racing	Ford	23.538	133.826
34	34	Todd Gilliland	Front Row Motorsports	Ford	23.631	133.299
35	51	Cody Ware	Rick Ware Racing	Ford	23.633	133.288
36	66	Joey Gase (i)	Garage 66	Ford	25.173	125.134
37	8	Kyle Busch	Richard Childress Racing	Chevrolet	0.000	0.000
Official qualifying results

== Race ==
=== Stage 1 ===
At the drop of the green flag, Chase Briscoe took the lead. However, by the end of the first lap, William Byron was out front. Austin Cindric and Brad Keselowski also passed Briscoe early in the running. Kyle Larson held down the fifth position. Byron moved away from the pack as Cindric and Keselowski staged their own battle for the second spot.

Keselowski hounded Byron, making several challenges for the lead. The #24 car held off every attempt to drop him out of the top spot until lap 67. Three laps before the end of the stage, Byron bobbled slightly, and Keselowski quickly moved around. Before Byron could recover, Cindric also made the pass. The mistake cost Byron a playoff point for the stage win and 2 position points for the Stage.

=== Stage 2 ===
On the restart, Briscoe and Byron again lead the field to the green. Ultimately, Ryan Blaney and Keselowski moved to the front of the pack. Late in the stage cautions dominated the action. Shane van Gisbergen spun. Blaney and Keselowski traded the lead as the yellow flags came in short sequences.

Cody Ware went around on the front stretch. Ty Dillon got bumped high by Todd Gilliland and backed into the outside wall. Finally, Carson Hocevar got pushed around by John Hunter Nemechek on the last lap of Stage Two. He stayed off the wall and the Stage ended with Keselowski again taking the green and white checkered flag.

=== Final stage ===
Again, it was Blaney and Keselowski on the front row for the restart in the Final Stage. Brad appears to be the class of the field, as he seems to be able to work his way to the front is he is near the front. Just 12 laps into the final stage, Denny Hamlin went around racing four-wide for the 20th position. Somehow, he avoided contact with any other car in the back of the pack.

Restarts were picking up in intensity and as we always said, "cautions breed cautions". Hocevar and Zane Smith get together after two laps of green flag racing and Smith spins. With 119 laps to go, some teams gambled on being able to stretch fuel to the end of the race, including leader Brad Keselowski, along with Kyle Busch.

Teammates Blaney and Cindric restarted on the front row with 114 laps to go. Ryan Preece, Josh Berry, and Chase Elliott rounded out the top five.

With 107 to go, Erik Jones and Briscoe went together racing three-wide with Bubba Wallace. Jones spun around and brought out the eighth caution. Most of the field pitted so they get on the same cycle with teams that pitted earlier. It looks like gas will not be an issue if the race ends within its scheduled 350 laps.

Austin Cindric led Berry and Elliott once green flag racing resumes as cars were scrambling for positions three and four wide back in the pack. The ninth caution of the race occurred on lap 253 when Tyler Reddick and Christopher Bell got together and spin high on the track. Everyone avoids the incident and neither car makes contact with the wall.

More cars pitted to make sure they were good to the finish on either tires or fuel.

Chase Elliott jumped away from the pack on the restart with 83 laps to go, William Byron filled in the second spot. Three laps later, Ty Dillon was bumped by Kyle Larson and loses it out of turn four for the 11th caution of the day. All of those slow downs are benefitting the teams trying to stretch fuel economy and cooling tires.

Byron won the restart race to turn one, And the 12th caution of the race happened as the right close out window on the #34 car of Todd Gilliland blew out and landed on the track. Chase Elliott pitted during the caution and will start back in the pack with 60 laps to go.

With 50 laps to go, Byron’s out front. Briscoe runs in second. Preece, Bowman, Keselowski, Hocevar, Nemechek, and Justin Haley hold down the next six positions. None of those six drivers have a win yet this season.

With 30 laps to go, Byron led by Briscoe by two car lengths and Keselowski was up to third and closing. All three were catching lapped traffic.

Byron ekes out enough fuel economy to take the win. Briscoe, Keselowski, and Blaney followed nose to tail a second behind the winner.

William Byron regained the regular season points lead, up 18 point on former leader Chase Elliott. Just 51 points separate the top four. Ryan Preece cut the points difference between himself and teammate Chris Buescher (on the bubble) for 42 to 23 points. Another winner outside of the top 17 was likely force both Buescher and Preece into the must win category to qualify for the postseason.

=== Race results ===
==== Stage results ====
Stage One Laps: 70

Pos	No	Driver	Team	Manufacturer	Points
1	6	Brad Keselowski	RFK Racing	Ford	10
2	2	Austin Cindric	Team Penske	Ford	9
3	24	William Byron	Hendrick Motorsports	Chevrolet	8
4	12	Ryan Blaney	Team Penske	Ford	7
5	19	Chase Briscoe	Joe Gibbs Racing	Toyota	6
6	5	Kyle Larson	Hendrick Motorsports	Chevrolet	5
7	77	Carson Hocevar	Spire Motorsports	Chevrolet	4
8	9	Chase Elliott	Hendrick Motorsports	Chevrolet	3
9	16	A. J. Allmendinger	Kaulig Racing	Chevrolet	2
10	7	Justin Haley	Spire Motorsports	Chevrolet	1
Official stage one results

Stage Two Laps: 140

Pos	No	Driver	Team	Manufacturer	Points
1	6	Brad Keselowski	RFK Racing	Ford	10
2	12	Ryan Blaney	Team Penske	Ford	9
3	2	Austin Cindric	Team Penske	Ford	8
4	54	Ty Gibbs	Joe Gibbs Racing	Toyota	7
5	8	Kyle Busch	Richard Childress Racing	Chevrolet	6
6	21	Josh Berry	Wood Brothers Racing	Ford	5
7	48	Alex Bowman	Hendrick Motorsports	Chevrolet	4
8	43	Erik Jones	Legacy Motor Club	Toyota	3
9	60	Ryan Preece	RFK Racing	Ford	2
10	3	Austin Dillon	Richard Childress Racing	Chevrolet	1
Official stage two results

=== Final Stage results ===
Stage Three Laps: 140

Pos	Grid	No	Driver	Team	Manufacturer	Laps	Points
1	2	24	William Byron	Hendrick Motorsports	Chevrolet	350	48
2	1	19	Chase Briscoe	Joe Gibbs Racing	Toyota	350	41
3	5	6	Brad Keselowski	RFK Racing	Ford	350	55
4	6	12	Ryan Blaney	Team Penske	Ford	350	49
5	33	60	Ryan Preece	RFK Racing	Ford	350	34
6	15	23	Bubba Wallace	23XI Racing	Toyota	350	31
7	16	48	Alex Bowman	Hendrick Motorsports	Chevrolet	350	34
8	7	77	Carson Hocevar	Spire Motorsports	Chevrolet	350	33
9	14	22	Joey Logano	Team Penske	Ford	350	28
10	18	3	Austin Dillon	Richard Childress Racing	Chevrolet	350	28
11	28	1	Ross Chastain	Trackhouse Racing	Chevrolet	350	26
12	4	2	Austin Cindric	Team Penske	Ford	350	42
13	12	21	Josh Berry	Wood Brothers Racing	Ford	350	29
14	8	9	Chase Elliott	Hendrick Motorsports	Chevrolet	350	26
15	29	42	John Hunter Nemechek	Legacy Motor Club	Toyota	350	22
16	25	43	Erik Jones	Legacy Motor Club	Toyota	350	24
17	17	20	Christopher Bell	Joe Gibbs Racing	Toyota	350	20
18	9	16	A. J. Allmendinger	Kaulig Racing	Chevrolet	350	21
19	22	45	Tyler Reddick	23XI Racing	Toyota	350	18
20	37	8	Kyle Busch	Richard Childress Racing	Chevrolet	350	23
21	20	54	Ty Gibbs	Joe Gibbs Racing	Toyota	350	23
22	27	17	Chris Buescher	RFK Racing	Ford	350	15
23	10	7	Justin Haley	Spire Motorsports	Chevrolet	350	15
24	11	11	Denny Hamlin	Joe Gibbs Racing	Toyota	350	13
25	26	99	Daniel Suárez	Trackhouse Racing	Chevrolet	350	12
26	19	41	Cole Custer	Haas Factory Team	Ford	350	11
27	13	71	Michael McDowell	Spire Motorsports	Chevrolet	350	10
28	3	5	Kyle Larson	Hendrick Motorsports	Chevrolet	350	14
29	31	4	Noah Gragson	Front Row Motorsports	Ford	350	8
30	24	35	Riley Herbst (R)	23XI Racing	Toyota	350	7
31	21	88	Shane van Gisbergen (R)	Trackhouse Racing	Chevrolet	349	6
32	35	51	Cody Ware	Rick Ware Racing	Ford	349	5
33	30	47	Ricky Stenhouse Jr.	Hyak Motorsports	Chevrolet	347	4
34	34	34	Todd Gilliland	Front Row Motorsports	Ford	347	3
35	32	10	Ty Dillon	Kaulig Racing	Chevrolet	346	2
36	23	38	Zane Smith	Front Row Motorsports	Ford	344	1
37	36	66	Joey Gase (i)	Garage 66	Ford	340	0
Official race results

=== Race statistics ===
- Lead changes: 10 among 6 different drivers
- Cautions/Laps: 12 for 72
- Red flags: 0
- Time of race: 3 hours, 17 minutes, and 47 seconds
- Average speed: 92.905 miles per hour (149.516 km/h)

== Media ==
=== Television ===
USA covered the race on the television side. Leigh Diffey, Jeff Burton, and Steve Letarte called the race from the broadcast booth. Dave Burns and Kim Coon handled the pit road duties from pit lane.

USA
Booth announcers	Pit reporters
Lap-by-lap: Leigh Diffey; Color-commentator: Jeff Burton; Color-commentator: Steve Letarte	Dave Burns; Kim Coon

=== Radio ===
Radio coverage of the race was broadcast by Motor Racing Network (MRN) and was also simulcast on Sirius XM NASCAR Radio.

MRN
Booth announcers	Turn announcers	Pit reporters
Lead announcer: Alex Hayden; Announcer: Mike Bagley; Announcer: Todd Gordon	Turns 1–2: Dave Moody; Turns 3–4: Kurt Becker	Steve Post; Brienne Pedigo; Jason Toy

== Standings after the race ==
Drivers' Championship standings

	Pos	Driver	Points
1	1	William Byron	770
1	2	Chase Elliott	752 (–18)
	3	Kyle Larson	725 (–45)
	4	Denny Hamlin	719 (–51)
	5	Christopher Bell	684 (–86)
	6	Tyler Reddick	673 (–97)
	7	Ryan Blaney	665 (–105)
	8	Chase Briscoe	640 (–130)
	9	Alex Bowman	614 (–156)
1	10	Bubba Wallace	581 (–189)
1	11	Chris Buescher	574 (–196)
	12	Joey Logano	560 (–210)
1	13	Ryan Preece	551 (–219)
1	14	Ross Chastain	544 (–226)
	15	Kyle Busch	501 (–269)
	16	Ty Gibbs	487 (–283)
Official driver's standings

Manufacturers' Championship standings

Pos	Manufacturer	Points
1	Chevrolet	845
2	Toyota	826 (–19)
3	Ford	764 (–81)

- Note: Only the first 16 positions are included for the driver standings.
- . – Driver has clinched a position in the NASCAR Cup Series playoffs.

Previous race: 2025 Brickyard 400	NASCAR Cup Series; 2025 season	Next race: 2025 Go Bowling at The Glen
