= Iowa Corn 350 =

NASCAR Cup Series race

Iowa Corn 350 powered by Ethanol

NASCAR Cup Series
- Venue: Iowa Speedway
- Location: Newton, Iowa, United States
- Corporate sponsor: Iowa Corn
- First race: 2024
- Distance: 306.25 mi (492.862 km)
- Laps: 350; Stage 1: 70; Final 2 stages: 140 each
- Most wins (driver): Ryan Blaney; William Byron; Ty Gibbs (1)
- Most wins (team): Team Penske; Hendrick Motorsports; Joe Gibbs Racing (1)
- Most wins (manufacturer): Ford; Chevrolet; Toyota (1)

Circuit information
- Surface: Asphalt
- Length: 0.875 mi (1.408 km)
- Turns: 4

The Iowa Corn 350 (officially known as the Iowa Corn 350 powered by Ethanol) is a NASCAR Cup Series stock car race held at Iowa Speedway in Newton, Iowa. It was the NASCAR Cup Series' first race at Iowa Speedway and first race in the state of Iowa.

Ty Gibbs is the defending race winner, having won it in 2026.

== History ==
Prior to 2024, NASCAR's lower two series, the NASCAR O'Reilly Auto Parts Series and the NASCAR Craftsman Truck Series, had races held at the track from 2009 (Trucks)/2011 (O'Reilly) until 2019; the races were removed from both series' 2020 calendars as a result of the COVID-19 pandemic-induced realignment, and did not return for either series' 2021 calendar. Initially, there were no plans of hosting the Cup Series at the track, due to lack of room in the schedule; following a management change in 2018, expansion plans were drawn up in order to make the track as part of the Cup Series calendar.

When Iowa Speedway became part of the Cup calendar in 2024, it replaced the Pala Casino 400 due to planned construction at the Auto Club Speedway. It was a late decision to race at Iowa Speedway as NASCAR were in discussions to race at Montreal, but no deal was made in time. The O'Reilly Series also returned to the track with the Hy-Vee PERKS 250, although the Truck Series did not.

The inaugural running of the race, held under the lights on Father's Day, featured Ryan Blaney winning a race plagued by tire issues, as the turns were repaved.

In 2025, the race moved to the first race of NBC's portion in early August due to a new TV deal, it retained its spot as NBC's first race in 2026. William Byron won this event.

On August 4, 2026, it was announced that the speedway would be getting a US$20 million renovation that includes resurfacing the track starting after the 2026 race. Ty Gibbs held off his JGR teammate to win.

On August 26, 2026, as part of the track renovations, it was announced that Iowa would be held over Independence Day for the 2027 season.

== Past winners ==
Year	Date	No.	Driver	Team	Manufacturer	Race Distance		Race Time	Average Speed (mph)	Report	Ref
Year	Date	No.	Driver	Team	Manufacturer	Laps	Miles (km)	Race Time	Average Speed (mph)	Report	Ref
2024	June 16	12	Ryan Blaney	Team Penske	Ford	350	306.25 (492.862)	2:58:37	102.874	Report	
2025	August 3	24	William Byron	Hendrick Motorsports	Chevrolet	350	306.25 (492.862)	3:17:47	92.905	Report	
2026	August 9	54	Ty Gibbs	Joe Gibbs Racing	Toyota	350	306.25 (492.862)	2:57:49	103.337	Report	
2027	July 4									Report	

Previous race: eero 400	NASCAR Cup Series; Iowa Corn 350	Next race: Toyota/Save Mart 350
