= 2024 Iowa Corn 350 =

NASCAR Cup Series race

2024 Iowa Corn 350 powered by Ethanol
Race details
- Race 17 of 36 in the 2024 NASCAR Cup Series
- Date: June 16, 2024
- Location: Iowa Speedway in Newton, Iowa
- Course: Permanent racing facility
- Course length: 0.875 miles (1.408 km)
- Distance: 350 laps, 306.25 mi (492.862 km)
- Average speed: 102.874 miles per hour (165.560 km/h)

Pole position
Driver	Kyle Larson	Hendrick Motorsports
- Time: 23.084

Most laps led
Driver	Ryan Blaney	Team Penske
- Laps: 201

Winner
No. 12	Ryan Blaney	Team Penske

Television in the United States
- Network: USA
- Announcers: Rick Allen, Jeff Burton and Steve Letarte
- Nielsen ratings: 1.4 (2.7 million)

Radio in the United States
- Radio: MRN
- Booth announcers: Alex Hayden, Jeff Striegle and Rusty Wallace
- Turn announcers: Mike Bagley (1 & 2) and Kurt Becker (3 & 4)

The 2024 Iowa Corn 350 was a NASCAR Cup Series race held on June 16, 2024, at Iowa Speedway in Newton, Iowa. Contested over 350 laps on the 0.875-mile (1.408 km) D-shaped oval, it was the 17th race of the 2024 NASCAR Cup Series season. Ryan Blaney won the race. William Byron finished 2nd, and Chase Elliott finished 3rd. Christopher Bell and Ricky Stenhouse Jr. rounded out the top five, and Joey Logano, Josh Berry, Alex Bowman, Daniel Suárez, and Brad Keselowski rounded out the top ten.

The repaved inside turns caused serious tire issues.

== Report ==
=== Background ===
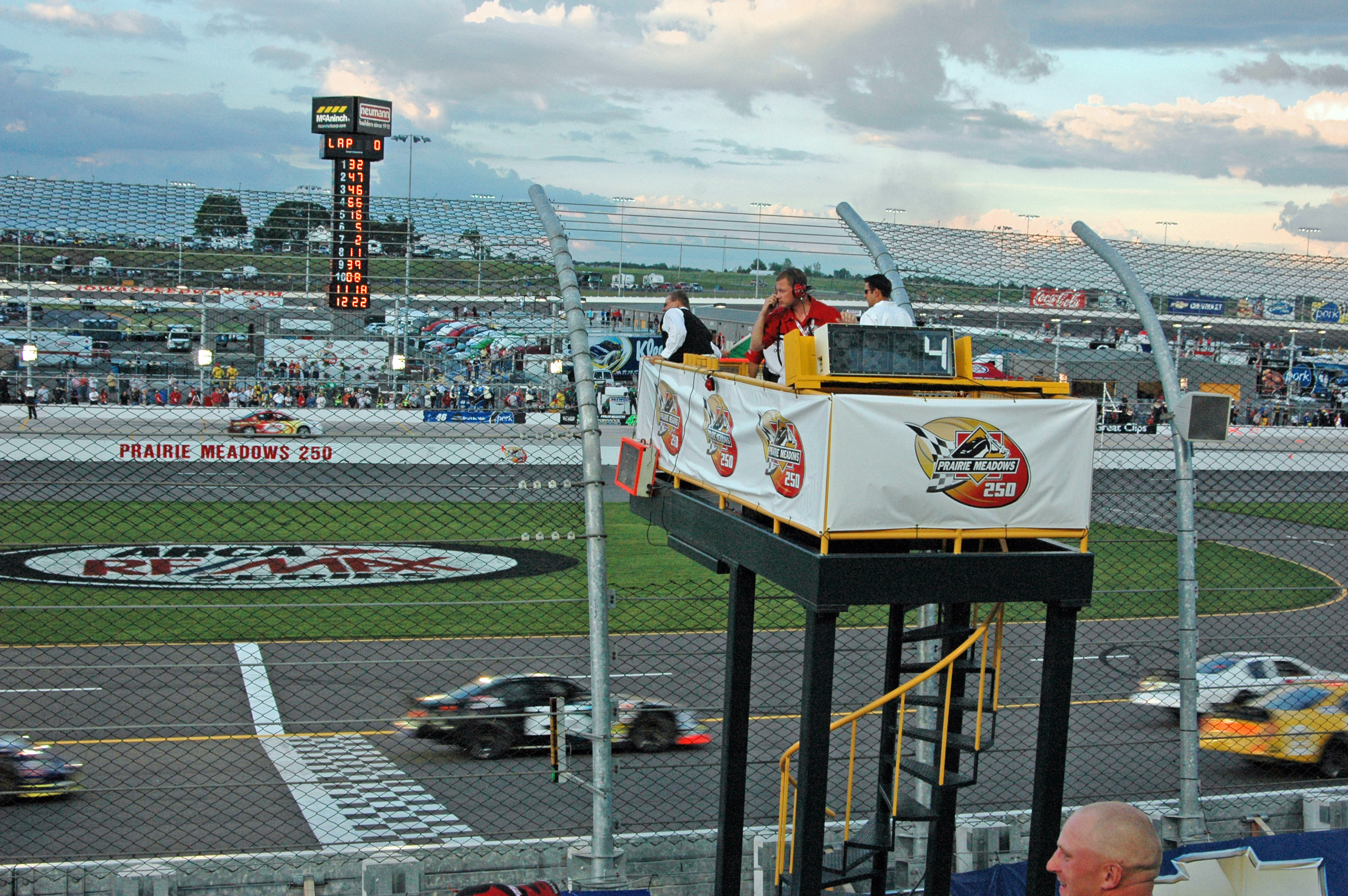
Flagstand of Iowa Speedway in June 2007, the track where the race was held.

Iowa Speedway is a 7/8-mile (1.4 km) paved oval motor racing track in Newton, Iowa, United States, approximately 30 miles (48 km) east of Des Moines. The track was designed with influence from Rusty Wallace and patterned after Richmond Raceway, a short track where Wallace was very successful. It has over 25,000 permanent seats as well as a unique multi-tiered Recreational Vehicle viewing area along the backstretch.

The race replaced the Pala Casino 400 due to planned construction at the Auto Club Speedway.

==== Entry list ====
- (R) denotes rookie driver.
- (i) denotes driver who is ineligible for series driver points.

No.	Driver	Team	Manufacturer
1	Ross Chastain	Trackhouse Racing	Chevrolet
2	Austin Cindric	Team Penske	Ford
3	Austin Dillon	Richard Childress Racing	Chevrolet
4	Josh Berry (R)	Stewart-Haas Racing	Ford
5	Kyle Larson	Hendrick Motorsports	Chevrolet
6	Brad Keselowski	RFK Racing	Ford
7	Corey LaJoie	Spire Motorsports	Chevrolet
8	Kyle Busch	Richard Childress Racing	Chevrolet
9	Chase Elliott	Hendrick Motorsports	Chevrolet
10	Noah Gragson	Stewart-Haas Racing	Ford
11	Denny Hamlin	Joe Gibbs Racing	Toyota
12	Ryan Blaney	Team Penske	Ford
14	Chase Briscoe	Stewart-Haas Racing	Ford
15	Kaz Grala (R)	Rick Ware Racing	Ford
16	A. J. Allmendinger (i)	Kaulig Racing	Chevrolet
17	Chris Buescher	RFK Racing	Ford
19	Martin Truex Jr.	Joe Gibbs Racing	Toyota
20	Christopher Bell	Joe Gibbs Racing	Toyota
21	Harrison Burton	Wood Brothers Racing	Ford
22	Joey Logano	Team Penske	Ford
23	Bubba Wallace	23XI Racing	Toyota
24	William Byron	Hendrick Motorsports	Chevrolet
31	Daniel Hemric	Kaulig Racing	Chevrolet
34	Michael McDowell	Front Row Motorsports	Ford
38	Todd Gilliland	Front Row Motorsports	Ford
41	Ryan Preece	Stewart-Haas Racing	Ford
42	John Hunter Nemechek	Legacy Motor Club	Toyota
43	Erik Jones	Legacy Motor Club	Toyota
45	Tyler Reddick	23XI Racing	Toyota
47	Ricky Stenhouse Jr.	JTG Daugherty Racing	Chevrolet
48	Alex Bowman	Hendrick Motorsports	Chevrolet
51	Justin Haley	Rick Ware Racing	Ford
54	Ty Gibbs	Joe Gibbs Racing	Toyota
71	Zane Smith (R)	Spire Motorsports	Chevrolet
77	Carson Hocevar (R)	Spire Motorsports	Chevrolet
99	Daniel Suárez	Trackhouse Racing	Chevrolet
Official entry list

== Practice ==
Noah Gragson was the fastest in the practice session with a time of 22.828 seconds and a speed of 137.988 mph (222.070 km/h).

=== Practice results ===
Pos	No.	Driver	Team	Manufacturer	Time	Speed
1	10	Noah Gragson	Stewart-Haas Racing	Ford	22.828	137.988
2	54	Ty Gibbs	Joe Gibbs Racing	Toyota	23.067	136.559
3	48	Alex Bowman	Hendrick Motorsports	Chevrolet	23.105	136.334
Official practice results

== Qualifying ==
Kyle Larson scored the pole for the race with a time of 23.084 and a speed of 136.458 mph (219.608 km/h). Qualifying was shortened to one round after it was delayed due to rain.

=== Qualifying results ===
Pos	No.	Driver	Team	Manufacturer	R1
1	5	Kyle Larson	Hendrick Motorsports	Chevrolet	23.084
2	12	Ryan Blaney	Team Penske	Ford	23.109
3	4	Josh Berry (R)	Stewart-Haas Racing	Ford	23.176
4	24	William Byron	Hendrick Motorsports	Chevrolet	23.231
5	6	Brad Keselowski	RFK Racing	Ford	23.275
6	14	Chase Briscoe	Stewart-Haas Racing	Ford	23.676
7	8	Kyle Busch	Richard Childress Racing	Chevrolet	23.697
8	45	Tyler Reddick	23XI Racing	Toyota	23.707
9	9	Chase Elliott	Hendrick Motorsports	Chevrolet	23.749
10	20	Christopher Bell	Joe Gibbs Racing	Toyota	23.884
11	22	Joey Logano	Team Penske	Ford	23.281
12	11	Denny Hamlin	Joe Gibbs Racing	Toyota	23.896
13	99	Daniel Suárez	Trackhouse Racing	Chevrolet	23.286
14	38	Todd Gilliland	Front Row Motorsports	Ford	23.909
15	17	Chris Buescher	RFK Racing	Ford	23.358
16	23	Bubba Wallace	23XI Racing	Toyota	23.984
17	1	Ross Chastain	Trackhouse Racing	Chevrolet	23.412
18	16	A. J. Allmendinger (i)	Kaulig Racing	Chevrolet	24.035
19	51	Justin Haley	Rick Ware Racing	Ford	23.475
20	77	Carson Hocevar (R)	Spire Motorsports	Chevrolet	24.037
21	2	Austin Cindric	Team Penske	Ford	23.500
22	34	Michael McDowell	Front Row Motorsports	Ford	24.041
23	10	Noah Gragson	Stewart-Haas Racing	Ford	23.534
24	7	Corey LaJoie	Spire Motorsports	Chevrolet	24.130
25	21	Harrison Burton	Wood Brothers Racing	Ford	23.571
26	71	Zane Smith (R)	Spire Motorsports	Chevrolet	24.211
27	54	Ty Gibbs	Joe Gibbs Racing	Toyota	23.599
28	15	Kaz Grala (R)	Rick Ware Racing	Ford	24.314
29	41	Ryan Preece	Stewart-Haas Racing	Ford	23.663
30	31	Daniel Hemric	Kaulig Racing	Chevrolet	24.332
31	19	Martin Truex Jr.	Joe Gibbs Racing	Toyota	23.698
32	43	Erik Jones	Legacy Motor Club	Toyota	24.522
33	48	Alex Bowman	Hendrick Motorsports	Chevrolet	23.716
34	42	John Hunter Nemechek	Legacy Motor Club	Toyota	24.628
35	47	Ricky Stenhouse Jr.	JTG Daugherty Racing	Chevrolet	23.988
36	3	Austin Dillon	Richard Childress Racing	Chevrolet	24.891
Official qualifying results

== Race ==
=== Race results ===
==== Stage results ====
Stage One Laps: 70

Pos	No	Driver	Team	Manufacturer	Points
1	12	Ryan Blaney	Team Penske	Ford	10
2	5	Kyle Larson	Hendrick Motorsports	Chevrolet	9
3	99	Daniel Suárez	Trackhouse Racing	Chevrolet	8
4	24	William Byron	Hendrick Motorsports	Chevrolet	7
5	4	Josh Berry (R)	Stewart-Haas Racing	Ford	6
6	22	Joey Logano	Team Penske	Ford	5
7	7	Corey LaJoie	Spire Motorsports	Chevrolet	4
8	6	Brad Keselowski	RFK Racing	Ford	3
9	9	Chase Elliott	Hendrick Motorsports	Chevrolet	2
10	8	Kyle Busch	Richard Childress Racing	Chevrolet	1
Official stage one results

Stage Two Laps: 140

Pos	No	Driver	Team	Manufacturer	Points
1	5	Kyle Larson	Hendrick Motorsports	Chevrolet	10
2	4	Josh Berry (R)	Stewart-Haas Racing	Ford	9
3	9	Chase Elliott	Hendrick Motorsports	Chevrolet	8
4	12	Ryan Blaney	Team Penske	Ford	7
5	23	Bubba Wallace	23XI Racing	Toyota	6
6	11	Denny Hamlin	Joe Gibbs Racing	Toyota	5
7	17	Chris Buescher	RFK Racing	Ford	4
8	38	Todd Gilliland	Front Row Motorsports	Ford	3
9	6	Brad Keselowski	RFK Racing	Ford	2
10	51	Justin Haley	Rick Ware Racing	Ford	1
Official stage two results

=== Final Stage results ===
Stage Three Laps: 140

Pos	Grid	No	Driver	Team	Manufacturer	Laps	Points
1	2	12	Ryan Blaney	Team Penske	Ford	350	57
2	4	24	William Byron	Hendrick Motorsports	Chevrolet	350	42
3	9	9	Chase Elliott	Hendrick Motorsports	Chevrolet	350	44
4	10	20	Christopher Bell	Joe Gibbs Racing	Toyota	350	33
5	35	47	Ricky Stenhouse Jr.	JTG Daugherty Racing	Chevrolet	350	32
6	11	22	Joey Logano	Team Penske	Ford	350	36
7	3	4	Josh Berry (R)	Stewart-Haas Racing	Ford	350	45
8	33	48	Alex Bowman	Hendrick Motorsports	Chevrolet	350	29
9	13	99	Daniel Suárez	Trackhouse Racing	Chevrolet	350	36
10	5	6	Brad Keselowski	RFK Racing	Ford	350	32
11	17	1	Ross Chastain	Trackhouse Racing	Chevrolet	350	26
12	14	38	Todd Gilliland	Front Row Motorsports	Ford	350	28
13	19	51	Justin Haley	Rick Ware Racing	Ford	350	25
14	20	77	Carson Hocevar (R)	Spire Motorsports	Chevrolet	350	23
15	31	19	Martin Truex Jr.	Joe Gibbs Racing	Toyota	349	22
16	23	10	Noah Gragson	Stewart-Haas Racing	Ford	349	21
17	16	23	Bubba Wallace	23XI Racing	Toyota	349	26
18	15	17	Chris Buescher	RFK Racing	Ford	349	23
19	36	3	Austin Dillon	Richard Childress Racing	Chevrolet	349	18
20	25	21	Harrison Burton	Wood Brothers Racing	Ford	349	17
21	24	7	Corey LaJoie	Spire Motorsports	Chevrolet	349	20
22	8	45	Tyler Reddick	23XI Racing	Toyota	349	15
23	22	34	Michael McDowell	Front Row Motorsports	Ford	349	14
24	12	11	Denny Hamlin	Joe Gibbs Racing	Toyota	348	18
25	27	54	Ty Gibbs	Joe Gibbs Racing	Toyota	348	12
26	34	42	John Hunter Nemechek	Legacy Motor Club	Toyota	348	11
27	29	41	Ryan Preece	Stewart-Haas Racing	Ford	348	10
28	6	14	Chase Briscoe	Stewart-Haas Racing	Ford	348	9
29	30	31	Daniel Hemric	Kaulig Racing	Chevrolet	348	8
30	21	2	Austin Cindric	Team Penske	Ford	347	7
31	26	71	Zane Smith (R)	Spire Motorsports	Chevrolet	347	6
32	32	43	Erik Jones	Legacy Motor Club	Toyota	347	5
33	28	15	Kaz Grala (R)	Rick Ware Racing	Ford	345	4
34	1	5	Kyle Larson	Hendrick Motorsports	Chevrolet	314	22
35	7	8	Kyle Busch	Richard Childress Racing	Chevrolet	272	3
36	18	16	A. J. Allmendinger (i)	Kaulig Racing	Chevrolet	54	0
Official race results

=== Race statistics ===
- Lead changes: 17 among 9 different drivers
- Cautions/Laps: 8 for 49
- Red flags: 0
- Time of race: 2 hours, 58 minutes, and 37 seconds
- Average speed: 102.874 miles per hour (165.560 km/h)

== Media ==
=== Television ===
USA covered the race on the television side. Rick Allen, Jeff Burton, and Steve Letarte called the race from the broadcast booth. Dave Burns, Kim Coon, and Marty Snider handled the pit road duties from pit lane.

USA
Booth announcers	Pit reporters
Lap-by-lap: Rick Allen; Color-commentator: Jeff Burton; Color-commentator: Steve Letarte	Dave Burns; Kim Coon; Marty Snider

=== Radio ===
Radio coverage of the race was broadcast by Motor Racing Network (MRN) and was also simulcast on Sirius XM NASCAR Radio.

MRN
Booth announcers	Turn announcers	Pit reporters
Lead announcer: Alex Hayden; Announcer: Jeff Striegle; Announcer: Rusty Wallace	Turns 1 & 2: Mike Bagley; Turns 3 & 4: Kurt Becker	Steve Post; Jacklyn Drake; Chris Wilner

== Standings after the race ==
Drivers' Championship standings

	Pos	Driver	Points
1	1	Chase Elliott	591
1	2	Kyle Larson	583 (–9)
	3	Denny Hamlin	553 (–38)
2	4	William Byron	537 (–54)
	5	Martin Truex Jr.	530 (–61)
2	6	Tyler Reddick	527 (–64)
5	7	Ryan Blaney	501 (–90)
1	8	Christopher Bell	498 (–93)
2	9	Brad Keselowski	498 (–93)
	10	Ross Chastain	479 (–112)
3	11	Ty Gibbs	478 (–113)
1	12	Alex Bowman	474 (–117)
	13	Chris Buescher	435 (–156)
	14	Bubba Wallace	414 (–177)
1	15	Joey Logano	408 (–183)
1	16	Kyle Busch	383 (–208)
Official driver's standings

Manufacturers' Championship standings

Pos	Manufacturer	Points
1	Chevrolet	617
2	Toyota	607 (–10)
3	Ford	588 (–29)

- Note: Only the first 16 positions are included for the driver standings.
- . – Driver has clinched a position in the NASCAR Cup Series playoffs.

Previous race: 2024 Toyota/Save Mart 350	NASCAR Cup Series; 2024 season	Next race: 2024 USA Today 301
