= Ty Gibbs =

American racing driver (born 2002)

- Gibbs at Las Vegas Motor Speedway in 2026
- Born: Tyler Randall Gibbs; October 4, 2002 (age 24); Charlotte, North Carolina, U.S.
- Height: 5 ft 7 in (1.70 m)
- Weight: 128 lb (58 kg)
- Achievements: 2022 NASCAR Xfinity Series Champion; 2021 ARCA Menards Series Champion; 2025 NASCAR In-Season Challenge Winner; 2024 NASCAR All-Star Open Winner; 2019 IceBreaker 125 Winner
- Awards: 2021 NASCAR Xfinity Series Rookie of the Year; 2023 NASCAR Cup Series Rookie of the Year

NASCAR Cup Series career
- 159 races run over 5 years
- Car no., team: No. 54 (Joe Gibbs Racing)
- 2026 position: 9th
- Best finish: 9th (2026)
- First race: 2022 M&M's Fan Appreciation 400 (Pocono)
- Last race: 2026 Season Finale 400 (Homestead)
- First win: 2026 Food City 500 (Bristol)
- Last win: 2026 Iowa Corn 350 (Iowa)
Wins	Top tens	Poles
2	53	3

NASCAR O'Reilly Auto Parts Series career
- 66 races run over 5 years
- 2025 position: 90th
- Best finish: 1st (2022)
- First race: 2021 Super Start Batteries 188 (Daytona RC)
- Last race: 2025 The Chilango 150 (Mexico City)
- First win: 2021 Super Start Batteries 188 (Daytona RC)
- Last win: 2023 Pennzoil 150 (Indianapolis G.P.)
Wins	Top tens	Poles
12	41	9

ARCA Menards Series career
- 47 races run over 3 years
- Best finish: 1st (2021)
- First race: 2019 ARCA Pensacola 200 (Pensacola)
- Last race: 2021 Reese's 150 (Kansas)
- First win: 2019 Dutch Boy 150 (Gateway)
- Last win: 2021 Bush's Beans 200 (Bristol)
Wins	Top tens	Poles
18	42	17

ARCA Menards Series East career
- 16 races run over 3 years
- Best finish: 2nd (2020)
- First race: 2019 New Smyrna 175 (New Smyrna)
- Last race: 2021 Bush's Beans 200 (Bristol)
- First win: 2019 Apple Barrel 125 (New Hampshire)
- Last win: 2021 Bush's Beans 200 (Bristol)
Wins	Top tens	Poles
6	15	5

ARCA Menards Series West career
- 4 races run over 3 years
- Best finish: 19th (2020, 2021)
- First race: 2019 Arizona Lottery 100 (Phoenix)
- Last race: 2021 Arizona Lottery 100 (Phoenix)
- First win: 2019 Arizona Lottery 100 (Phoenix)
- Last win: 2021 Arizona Lottery 100 (Phoenix)
Wins	Top tens	Poles
3	4	1
- Statistics up to date as of November 8, 2026.

Tyler Randell Gibbs (born October 4, 2002) is an American professional stock car racing driver and team owner. He competes full-time in the NASCAR Cup Series, driving the No. 54 Toyota Camry XSE for Joe Gibbs Racing. Gibbs was the 2022 NASCAR Xfinity Series champion and 2021 ARCA Menards Series champion. He is the grandson of NFL Hall-of-Famer and NASCAR team owner Joe Gibbs. He is also the owner of JGR's No. 54 in the O'Reilly Auto Parts Series.

== Racing career ==
Gibbs began racing in go-karts, on asphalt and dirt tracks in Mooresville, North Carolina. In 2019, Gibbs won the IceBreaker 125 Late Model Stock race at Myrtle Beach Speedway, driving the No. 18 for Nelson Motorsports.

=== CARS Late Model Stock Tour ===
In 2017 and 2018, Gibbs competed in the CARS Late Model Stock series for Marlowe Racing. He finished fourteenth in the season points standings in 2017 (due to Gibbs only competing in eight out of thirteen races that year), and eighth in 2018. He has two pole positions, has led 90 laps, and has an average finish of 13.3, with a best finish of second at Anderson Motor Speedway.

=== ARCA Menards Series East ===
Gibbs ran a partial schedule in the 2019 NASCAR K&N Pro Series East, collecting four second-place finishes in five starts in the DGR-Crosley No. 17. On September 21, Gibbs scored his first career win in his sixth start at the Apple Barrel 125 at New Hampshire Motor Speedway in the No. 54. He would compete full-time in the series, now known as the ARCA Menards Series East, the following year. He drove the No. 18 for Joe Gibbs Racing, which was fielding an entry in the series for the first time since 2012. Gibbs would win one of the series' six races on the schedule (Toledo Speedway in June) and finish runner-up to Sam Mayer in the standings, who won all other races that year. Gibbs led 104 laps at Dover in the General Tire 125 before crashing out late, marking his only DNF in the series and only finish outside the top four in any year.

Gibbs made four starts in the 2021 season, three of which were companion events with the main ARCA Menards Series. Gibbs won the pole position and the race in all four starts, leading 621 of the 625 laps he completed. As a result, he finished ninth in the standings.

=== ARCA Menards Series West ===
Gibbs made his debut in the NASCAR K&N Pro Series West in the 2019 season-finale at Phoenix Raceway, going on to win the race. Joe Gibbs Racing fielded cars for him and his ARCA teammate Riley Herbst in this race, using owner points from both of Levin Racing's cars, with Herbst driving the No. 10 and Gibbs driving the No. 40. He returned to run the same race the following year, this time with JGR fielding their own No. 18 car with their owner points. He led the most laps in the event but finished second after being passed by David Gilliland on the final lap. In 2021, Gibbs ran both races at Phoenix, starting on the pole and winning both events. The first event in March was a companion event with the main ARCA Menards Series, while the second race in November was the West Series season finale. Gibbs led 124 of 150 laps in the March race and all 100 laps in the fall race. He finished 19th in both the 2020 and 2021 standings.

=== ARCA Menards Series ===
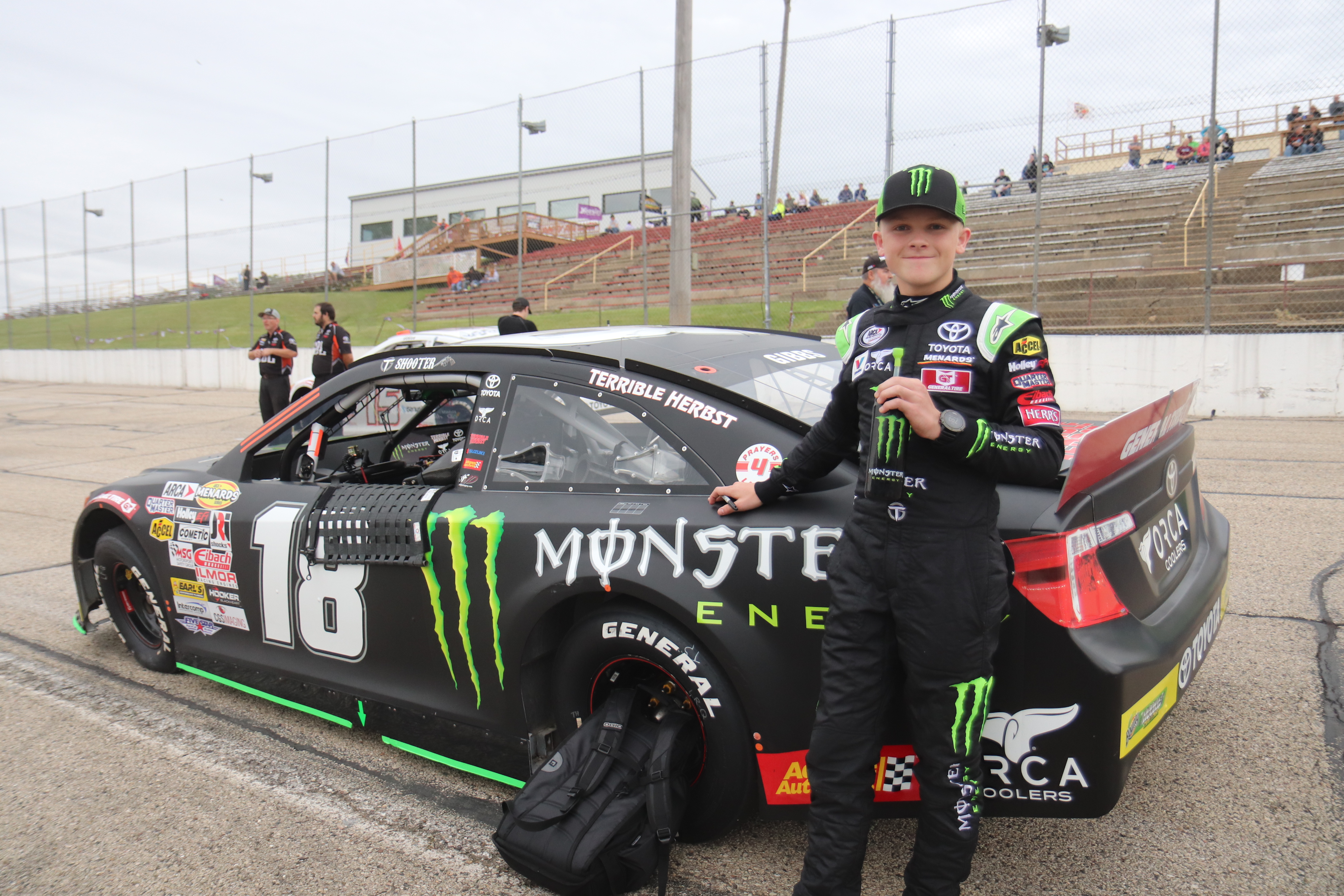
Gibbs beside his ARCA car before the race at Madison in 2019

Gibbs has won 18 ARCA Menards Series races and collected 38 top-five finishes in a total of 47 starts.

In 2019, Gibbs ran eleven of twenty races in the ARCA Menards Series, finishing thirteenth in the standings after picking up wins at Gateway and Salem. The next year he competed in 16 of 20 races and finished fifth in the standings, collecting wins at Gateway, Pocono, Kentucky, Iowa, Winchester, and Memphis.

Gibbs turned eighteen on October 4, 2020, which made him eligible to race on all tracks on the ARCA schedule (including Daytona and Talladega). In 2021, Gibbs ran full-time in the series in the JGR No. 18. He started the season with a 4th-place finish at Daytona, followed by a win at Phoenix and a 27th-place finish at Talladega after being involved in a crash with Greg Van Alst. At Kansas in May, he led every lap in the race en route to the win, the first time since Kevin Swindell in 2012 at Chicagoland Speedway that a driver in the series led all laps in a race. Gibbs would later replicate this feat at Charlotte two races later and at the Milwaukee Mile in August.

Gibbs ended the 2021 season as champion, having won ten out of twenty races. He spent the season in a close points battle with Corey Heim and finished in the top five in every race except Talladega Superspeedway, where he crashed out of the top five and finished 27th.

=== Xfinity Series ===
==== 2021 ====
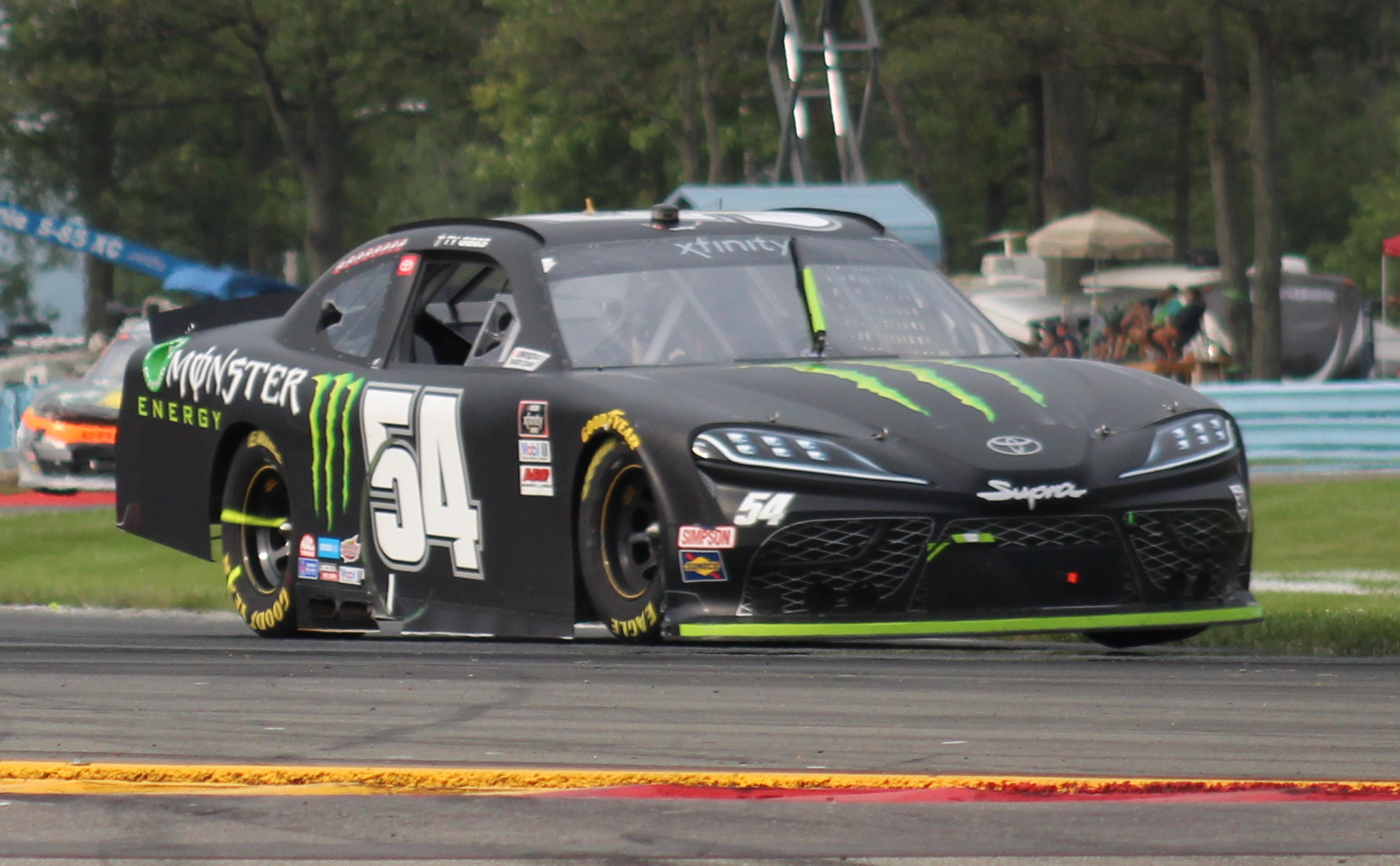
Gibbs in the No. 54 at Watkins Glen International in 2021

On January 26, 2021, JGR announced that Gibbs would make his Xfinity Series debut in 2021 at the Daytona Road Course, which would be the first race of a part-time schedule he would run in the team's No. 54 car. He shared the ride with Kyle Busch, Denny Hamlin, Martin Truex Jr., John Hunter Nemechek, and Ty Dillon.

On the Daytona Road Course, Gibbs held off Austin Cindric in overtime to win, becoming the sixth driver to win in their Xfinity debut (after Dale Earnhardt, Ricky Rudd, Joe Ruttman, Terry Labonte, and Kurt Busch) and the first to do so without prior experience in the NASCAR Cup Series. He was also the only driver in the modern era (1972–present) to win their first NASCAR national series race until Shane van Gisbergen. At eighteen years, four months, and sixteen days of age, Gibbs surpassed Cindric as the youngest driver to win an Xfinity road course race, until he was surpassed by Connor Zilisch in the 2024 Mission 200 at The Glen. Gibbs later won again at Charlotte Motor Speedway in May. At Road America, one of Gibbs's races, Kyle Busch ran the No. 54, leading JGR to put Gibbs in the No. 81 with Monster Energy as a sponsor. Gibbs would end up 33rd after a broken transmission. At Watkins Glen International in the No. 54, Gibbs led the most laps and won after holding off Austin Cindric and A. J. Allmendinger. He later led the most laps in the race at Richmond Raceway in September before ending up seventh. Gibbs got his fourth win of the season in the Kansas Lottery 300 in October and finished the season thirteenth in the final standings, despite only having started eighteen of the season's 33 races in addition to winning Rookie of the Year honors.

==== 2022: Xfinity Series Champion ====
For 2022, Gibbs moved into the series full-time, driving the No. 54. He won early in the season at Las Vegas, Atlanta, and Richmond. At the Martinsville spring race on April 8, Gibbs led 196 laps but was passed by teammate Brandon Jones on the final lap and finished eighth after a bump from Sam Mayer in the final turn. After the race, Gibbs ran into Mayer's car during the cool-down lap before both drivers engaged in a fistfight on pit road. Following this incident, Gibbs was fined US$15,000 for hitting Mayer's car on pit road after the race. Gibbs scored his fourth win at Road America in July by passing Kyle Larson on the final lap and claimed his fifth win of the season a month later at Michigan. At Watkins Glen, Gibbs fiercely battled William Byron for the lead throughout most of the race until they both spun off-course during the final restart, resulting in Gibbs finishing 27th after Byron spun Gibbs again later on in the lap. At the Martinsville playoff race, Gibbs made contact with Jones which sent him spinning towards outside wall on the final overtime lap to win the race despite having already clinched a spot in the Championship four on points. After the race, he compared himself to Jesus in an interview on the SiriusXM NASCAR channel, which earned him criticism from sections of the NASCAR fanbase. Nonetheless, Gibbs dominated at Phoenix to become the 2022 NASCAR Xfinity Series champion.

==== 2023: Part-time ====
Gibbs drove the No. 19 on a part-time basis in 2023, scoring one win at Indianapolis.

=== Cup Series ===
==== 2022 ====
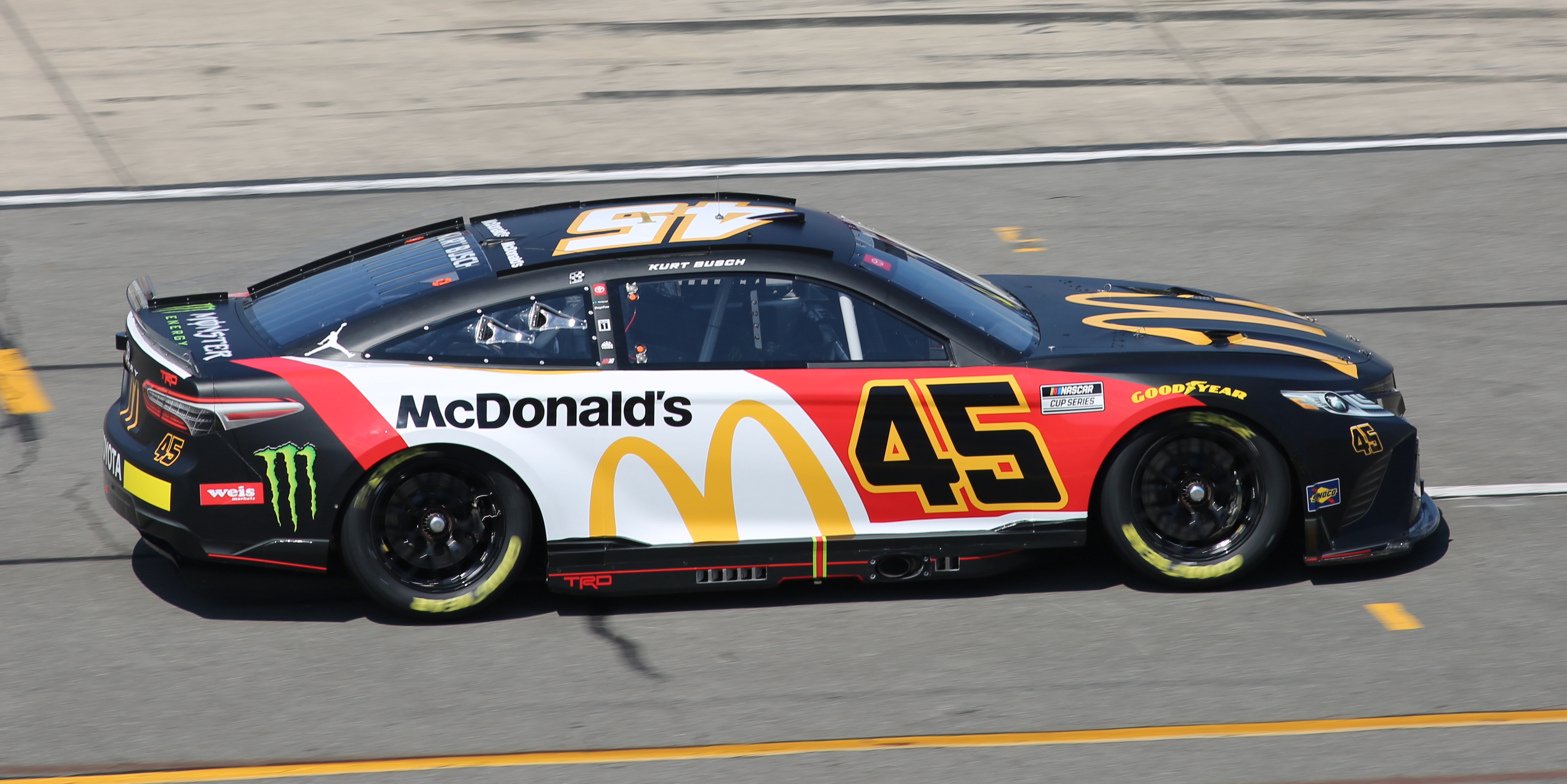
Gibbs in the No. 45 at Pocono Raceway in 2022

On July 24, 2022, 23XI Racing announced that Gibbs would make his NASCAR Cup Series debut at the 2022 M&M's Fan Appreciation 400 at Pocono the same day, driving the No. 45 car as a fill-in for the original driver, Kurt Busch. Busch was not cleared by NASCAR to race after suffering from concussion-like symptoms following a crash during qualifying. Gibbs finished 16th in the race. Three days later, he would be announced to fill in again for Busch in the Verizon 200 at Indianapolis, where he finished 17th. In the FireKeepers Casino 400 at Michigan, Gibbs scored his first career top-10 with a 10th place finish, but finished 36th the following week at Richmond after an engine failure, but he surpassed his late father Coy. Gibbs filled in for Busch during the last two regular season races at Watkins Glen and Daytona, in which he finished 26th and 13th, respectively. On August 31, it was announced that he would swap rides with teammate Bubba Wallace and drive the No. 23 car starting at Darlington; Wallace went to the No. 45 to help the team's owners' championship efforts. At the Texas playoff race, Gibbs veered into Ty Dillon on pit road, nearly sending Dillon towards a NASCAR official and a group of pit crew members; he was subsequently fined US$75,000 and the No. 23 was docked 25 owner points. Gibbs would end up missing the last race of his fill-in role for 23XI, the 2022 NASCAR Cup Series Championship Race, due to the death of his father Coy and was replaced by Daniel Hemric.

==== 2023 ====
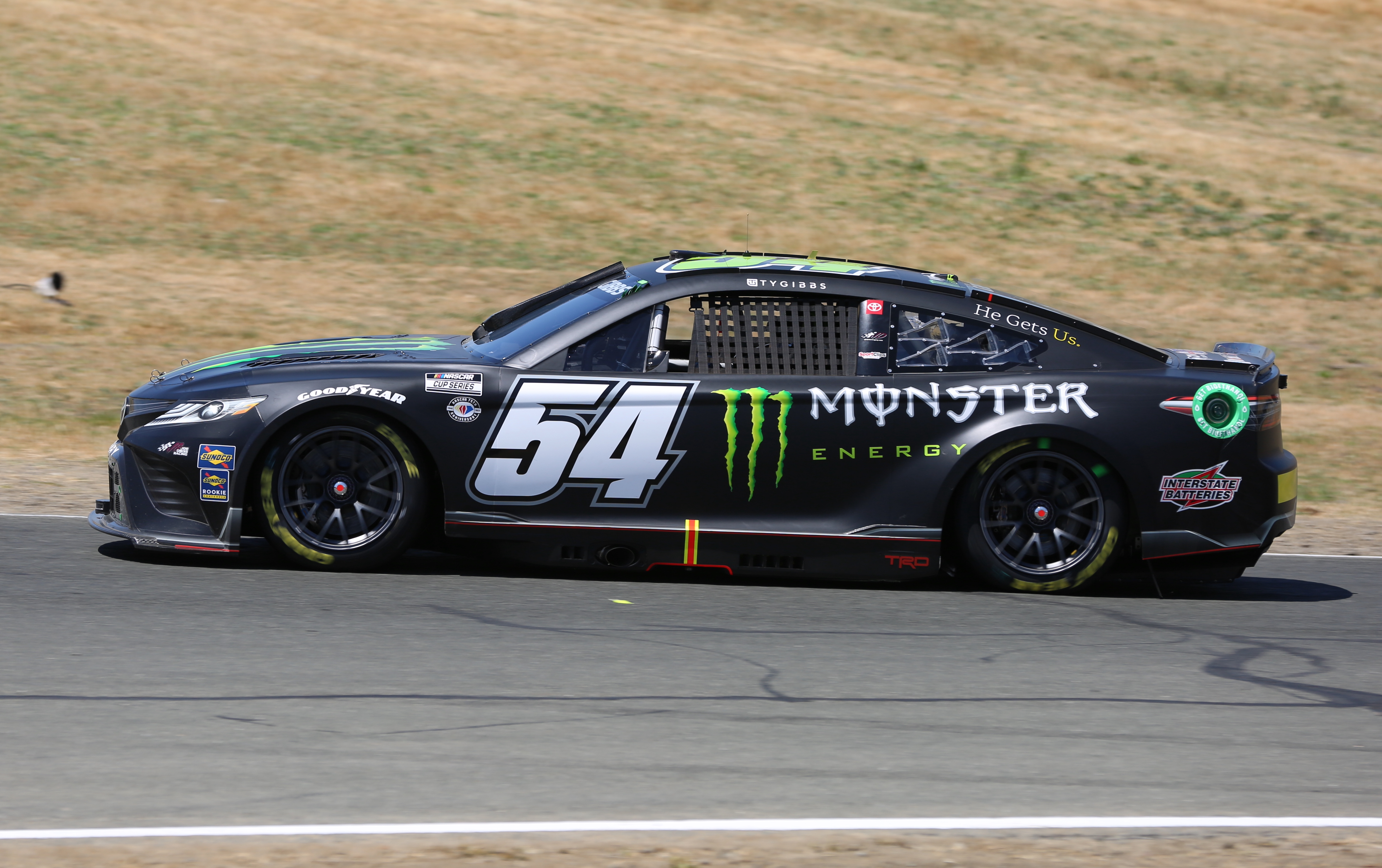
Gibbs in the No. 54 at Sonoma Raceway in 2023

In 2023, Gibbs joined the NASCAR Cup Series on a full-time basis, driving the newly rebranded No. 54 for Joe Gibbs Racing. Despite missing the playoffs, Gibbs achieved four top-five finishes and earned the NASCAR Rookie of the Year title.

==== 2024: First playoff appearance ====
Gibbs scored his first career pole at Charlotte, and his second at Pocono. Despite not winning a race during the regular season, he stayed consistent enough to make the playoffs. Gibbs was eliminated from the playoffs at the conclusion of the Round of 16. After poor finishes in the final five races of the season, Gibbs finished the year fifteenth in the final point standings, a career best.

==== 2025: In-Season Challenge winner ====
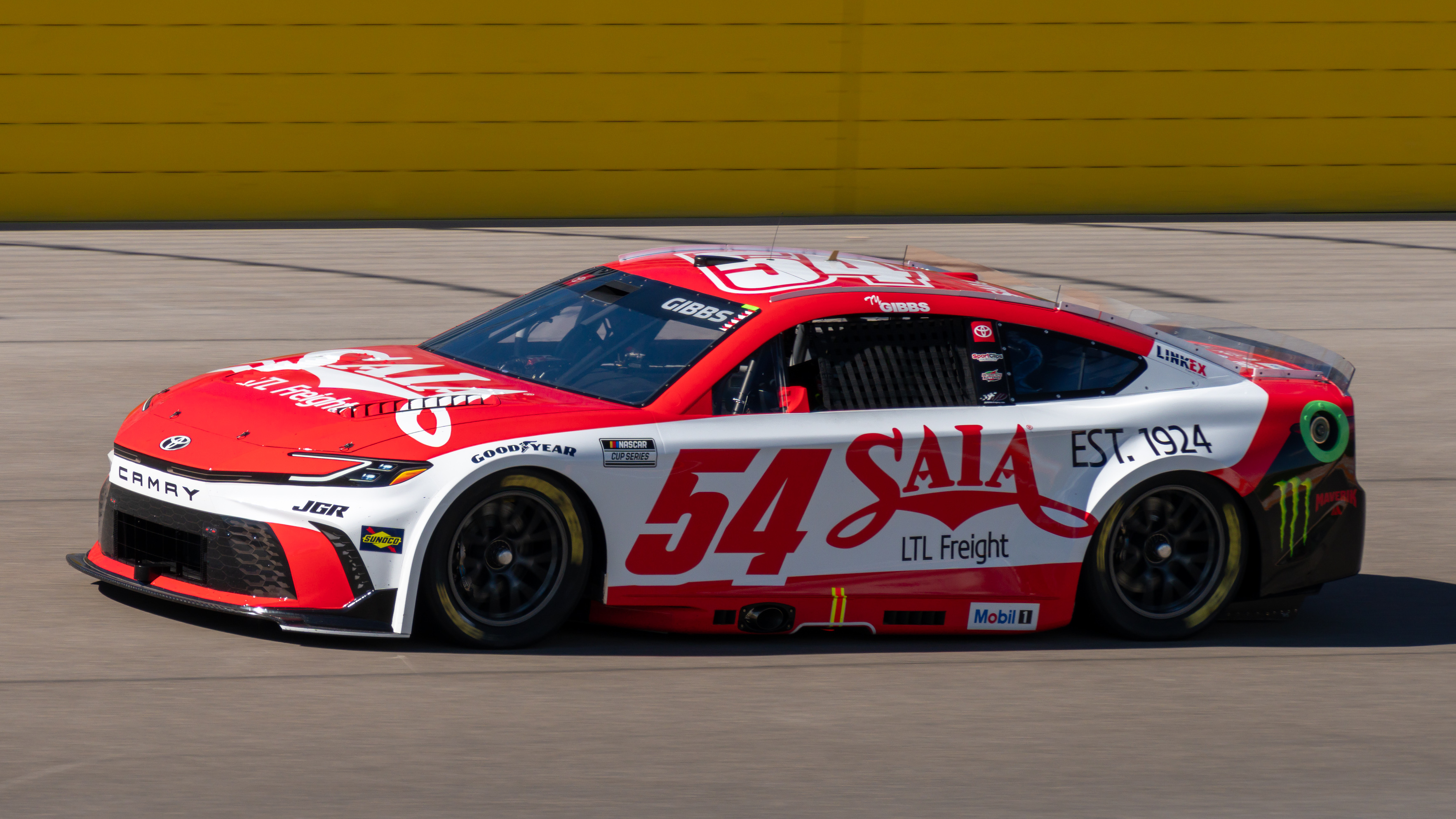
Gibbs during practice for the 2025 South Point 400

As part of a restructuring within Joe Gibbs Racing, Gibbs was assigned a new crew chief, Tyler Allen, while his former crew chief, Chris Gayle, transitioned to Denny Hamlin's No. 11 team, replacing Chris Gabehart, who moved into the role of competition director. At Martinsville, Gibbs passed J. J. Yeley to claim the unfortunate record of becoming the driver with the most Cup Series starts for JGR without a win, having run 79 races for the team to that point. Gibbs also won the inaugural NASCAR In-Season Challenge after defeating opponent Ty Dillon.

During the race at New Hampshire, Gibbs and his teammate Denny Hamlin got into one another, with Hamlin spinning out Gibbs. On September 22, Gibbs posted on his Instagram agreeing with Kevin Harvick, who said that the latest drama inside JGR was potentially derailing Hamlin's 2025 title run.

==== 2026: First wins ====
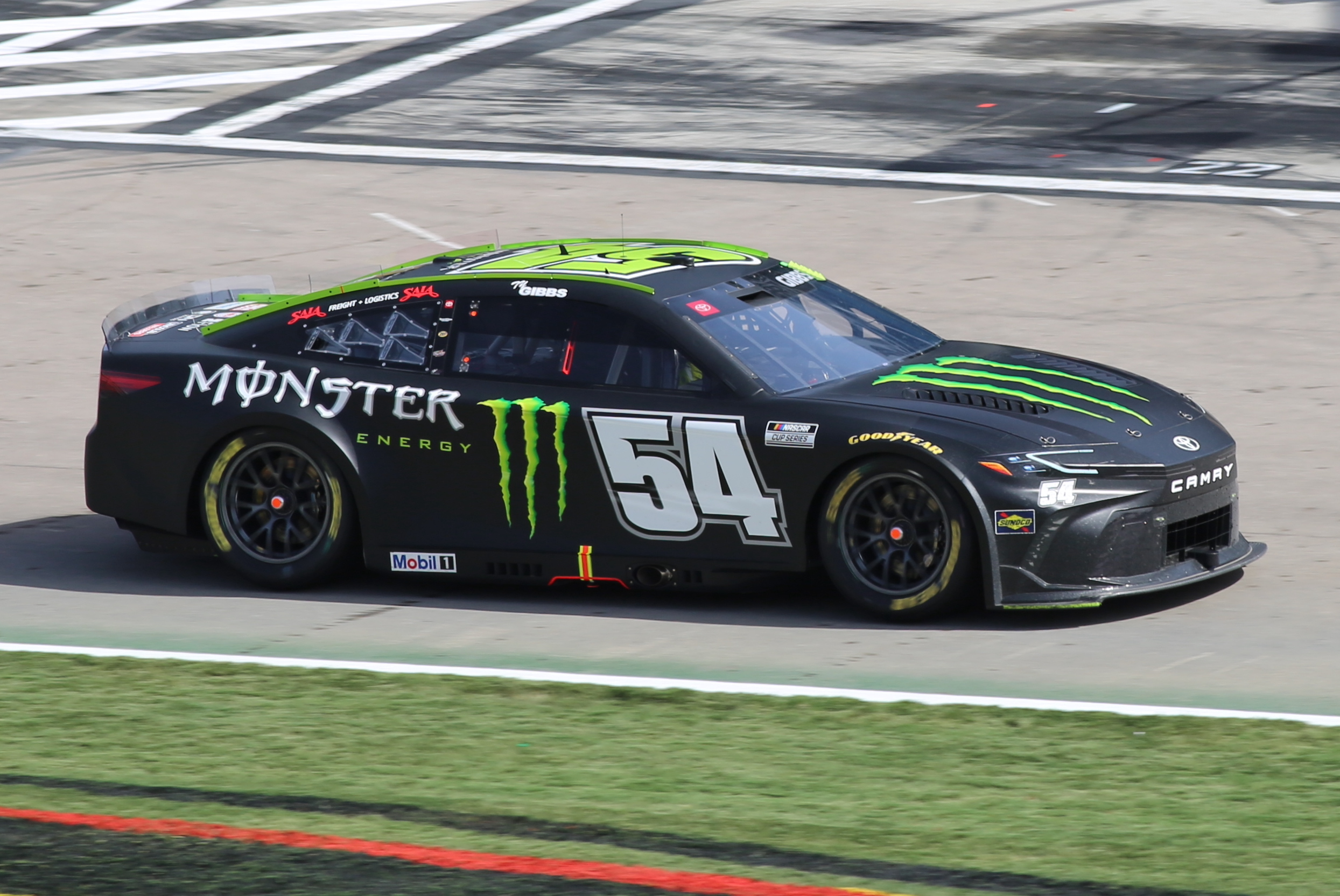
Gibbs during the 2026 Pennzoil 400

Gibbs started the 2026 season with a 23rd place finish at the Daytona 500. Two months later, he would earn his first win at Bristol in his 131st start, as well as becoming the sixth driver to get their first win at Bristol Motor Speedway. Gibbs won the pole at Sonoma. He won his second career race at Iowa, holding off-teammate Christopher Bell.

== Owner career ==
On October 16, 2024, it was announced that Gibbs would become a co-owner of Joe Gibbs Racing and would own the No. 54 Toyota Supra for the NASCAR O’Reilly Auto Parts Series starting in 2025.

== Personal life ==
Gibbs is the grandson of former Washington Redskins head coach and owner of Joe Gibbs Racing, Joe Gibbs, and the son of the late former Washington Redskins assistant coach and former NASCAR driver Coy Gibbs and Charlotte-area realtor Heather Gibbs. He is the nephew of the late Joe Gibbs Racing co-owner J. D. Gibbs, as well as the cousin of former Appalachian State Mountaineers quarterback Jackson Gibbs and Appalachian State tight end Miller Gibbs.

== Motorsports career results ==
=== Stock car career summary ===
Season	Series	Team	Races	Wins	Top 5	Top 10	Points	Position
2017	CARS Late Model Stock Tour		8	0	1	1	170	14th
2018	CARS Late Model Stock Tour		12	0	3	5	258	8th
2019	ARCA Menards Series	Joe Gibbs Racing	11	2	7	9	2315	13th
2019	NASCAR K&N Pro Series East	DGR-Crosley	6	1	6	6	172	13th
2019	NASCAR K&N Pro Series West	Levin Racing with Joe Gibbs Racing	1	1	1	1	47	34th
2019	CARS Late Model Stock Tour		2	0	0	0	13	56th
2020	ARCA Menards Series	Joe Gibbs Racing	16	6	12	14	674	5th
2020	ARCA Menards Series East	Joe Gibbs Racing	6	1	5	5	300	**2nd**
2020	ARCA Menards Series West	Joe Gibbs Racing	1	0	1	1	94	19th
2021	NASCAR Xfinity Series	Joe Gibbs Racing	18	4	9	10	663	13th
2021	ARCA Menards Series	Joe Gibbs Racing	20	10	19	19	997	**1st**
2021	ARCA Menards Series East	Joe Gibbs Racing	4	4	4	4	196	9th
2021	ARCA Menards Series West	Joe Gibbs Racing	2	2	2	2	98	19th
2022	NASCAR Cup Series	23XI Racing	15	0	0	1	0	NC†
2022	NASCAR Xfinity Series	Joe Gibbs Racing	33	7	16	23	4040	**1st**
2023	NASCAR Cup Series	Joe Gibbs Racing	36	0	4	10	771	18th
2023	NASCAR Xfinity Series	Joe Gibbs Racing	8	1	5	6	0	NC†
2024	NASCAR Cup Series	Joe Gibbs Racing	36	0	8	12	2169	15th
2024	NASCAR Xfinity Series	Joe Gibbs Racing	6	0	1	2	0	NC†
2025	NASCAR Cup Series	Joe Gibbs Racing	36	0	5	10	783	19th
2025	NASCAR Xfinity Series	Joe Gibbs Racing	1	0	0	0	0	NC†

^{†} As Gibbs was a guest driver, he was ineligible for championship points.

=== NASCAR ===
(key) (Bold – Pole position awarded by qualifying time. Italics – Pole position earned by points standings or practice time. * – Most laps led.)

==== Cup Series ====
NASCAR Cup Series results
Year	Team	No.	Make	1	2	3	4	5	6	7	8	9	10	11	12	13	14	15	16	17	18	19	20	21	22	23	24	25	26	27	28	29	30	31	32	33	34	35	36	NCSC	Pts	Ref
2022	23XI Racing	45	Toyota	DAY	CAL	LVS	PHO	ATL	COA	RCH	MAR	BRD	TAL	DOV	DAR	KAN	CLT	GTW	SON	NSH	ROA	ATL	NHA	POC; 16	IRC; 17	MCH; 10	RCH; 36	GLN; 26	DAY; 13											47th	0^{1}	
2022	23XI Racing	23	Toyota																											DAR; 15	KAN; 34	BRI; 35	TEX; 20	TAL; 37	ROV; 22	LVS; 22	HOM; 22	MAR; 19	PHO; QL^{†}	47th	0^{1}	
2023	Joe Gibbs Racing	54	Toyota	DAY; 25	CAL; 16	LVS; 22	PHO; 28	ATL; 9	COA; 9	RCH; 9	BRD; 10	MAR; 18	TAL; 31	DOV; 13	KAN; 34	DAR; 16	CLT; 26	GTW; 20	SON; 18	NSH; 14	CSC; 9	ATL; 34	NHA; 27	POC; 5	RCH; 15	MCH; 11	IRC; 12	GLN; 5	DAY; 35	DAR; 21	KAN; 14	BRI; 5	TEX; 33	TAL; 34	ROV; 4	LVS; 34	HOM; 7	MAR; 18	PHO; 21	18th	771	
2024	Joe Gibbs Racing	54	Toyota	DAY; 17	ATL; 10	LVS; 5	PHO; 3	BRI; 9	COA; 3	RCH; 16	MAR; 19	TEX; 13	TAL; 22	DOV; 10	KAN; 32	DAR; 2	**CLT**; 6	GTW; 11	SON; 37	IOW; 25	NHA; 16	NSH; 23	CSC; 3*	**POC**; 27	IND; 23	RCH; 22	MCH; 3	DAY; 5	DAR; 20	ATL; 17	GLN; 22	BRI; 15	KAN; 5	TAL; 13	ROV; 35	LVS; 30	HOM; 36	MAR; 32	PHO; 40	15th	2169	
2025	Joe Gibbs Racing	54	Toyota	DAY; 16	ATL; 32	COA; 34	PHO; 25	LVS; 22	HOM; 25	MAR; 13	DAR; 9	BRI; 3	TAL; 17*	TEX; 23	KAN; 28	CLT; 24	NSH; 31	MCH; 3	MXC; 11	POC; 14	ATL; 14	CSC; 2	SON; 7	DOV; 5	IND; 21	IOW; 21	GLN; 33	RCH; 18	DAY; 8	DAR; 22	GTW; 10	BRI; 10*	NHA; 35	KAN; 25	ROV; 12	LVS; 34	TAL; 3	MAR; 12	PHO; 21	19th	783	
2026	Joe Gibbs Racing	54	Toyota	DAY; 23	ATL; 37	COA; 4	PHO; 4	LVS; 5	DAR; 6	MAR; 4	BRI; 1	KAN; 9	TAL; 34	TEX; 36	GLN; 3	CLT; 6	NSH; 13	MCH; 25	POC; 9	COR; 15	**SON**; 3	CHI; 8	ATL; 4	NWS; 4	IND; 12	IOW; 1	RCH; 15	NHA; 6	DAY; 34	DAR; 2	GTW; 18	BRI; 5	KAN; 17	LVS; 17	CLT; 34	PHO; 10	TAL; 17	MAR; 3	HOM; 11	9th	2335	
^{†} – Qualified but replaced by Daniel Hemric.

===== Daytona 500 =====
Year	Team	Manufacturer	Start	Finish
2023	Joe Gibbs Racing	Toyota	35	25
2024	Joe Gibbs Racing	Toyota	15	17
2025	Joe Gibbs Racing	Toyota	23	16
2026	Joe Gibbs Racing	Toyota	20	23

==== Xfinity Series ====
NASCAR Xfinity Series results
Year	Team	No.	Make	1	2	3	4	5	6	7	8	9	10	11	12	13	14	15	16	17	18	19	20	21	22	23	24	25	26	27	28	29	30	31	32	33	NXSC	Pts	Ref
2021	Joe Gibbs Racing	54	Toyota	DAY	DRC; 1	HOM	LVS	PHO; 2	ATL	MAR; 4	TAL	DAR; 18	DOV; 5	COA	CLT; 1	MOH; 3	TEX	NSH	POC; 2				GLN; 1*	IRC; 19	MCH; 13	DAY	DAR	RCH; 7*	BRI; 11	LVS; 11	TAL	ROV; 21	TEX	KAN; 1	MAR; 27	PHO	13th	663	
2021	Joe Gibbs Racing	81	Toyota																	**ROA**; 33	ATL	NHA															13th	663	
2022	Joe Gibbs Racing	54	Toyota	DAY; 11	CAL; 13	LVS; 1	PHO; 6	ATL; 1	**COA**; 15	**RCH**; 1	**MAR**; 8*	TAL; 35	DOV; 3	DAR; 16	TEX; 12	CLT; 2	PIR; 7*	NSH; 4	ROA; 1	ATL; 35	NHA; 21*	POC; 2	IRC; 8	MCH; 1*	GLN; 27	DAY; 7	DAR; 6	KAN; 3*	**BRI**; 36	TEX; 3	TAL; 7	ROV; 2	LVS; 4	HOM; 2	MAR; 1*	**PHO**; 1*	1st	4040	
2023	Joe Gibbs Racing	19	Toyota	DAY	CAL	LVS	PHO	ATL	COA; 3	RCH	MAR	TAL	DOV	DAR	CLT; 5	PIR	SON; 4	NSH; 37	CSC	ATL; 6	NHA	POC	ROA	MCH; 4	IRC; 1*	**GLN**; 17*	DAY	DAR	KAN	BRI	TEX	ROV	LVS	HOM	MAR	PHO	74th	0^{1}	
2024	Joe Gibbs Racing	19	Toyota	DAY	ATL	LVS	PHO	COA; 24	RCH	MAR	TEX	TAL	DOV	DAR			SON; 35	IOW	NHA	**NSH**; 20	CSC; 2	POC	IND	MCH	DAY	DAR	ATL	GLN; 25	BRI	KAN	TAL	ROV	LVS	HOM	MAR	PHO	81st	0^{1}	
2024	Joe Gibbs Racing	20	Toyota												**CLT**; 9	PIR																					81st	0^{1}	
2025	Joe Gibbs Racing	19	Toyota	DAY	ATL	COA	PHO	LVS	HOM	MAR	DAR	BRI	CAR	TAL	TEX	CLT	NSH	MXC; 14	POC	ATL	CSC	SON	DOV	IND	IOW	GLN	DAY	PIR	GTW	BRI	KAN	ROV	LVS	TAL	MAR	PHO	90th	0^{1}	

^{*} Season still in progress
^{1} Ineligible for series points

=== ARCA Menards Series ===
(key) (Bold – Pole position awarded by qualifying time. Italics – Pole position earned by points standings or practice time. * – Most laps led. ** – All laps led.)

ARCA Menards Series results
Year	Team	No.	Make	1	2	3	4	5	6	7	8	9	10	11	12	13	14	15	16	17	18	19	20	AMSC	Pts	Ref
2019	Joe Gibbs Racing	18	Toyota	DAY	FIF; 2	SLM; 6	TAL	NSH; 2	TOL; 2	CLT	POC	MCH	MAD; 8	GTW; 1	CHI	ELK; 2	IOW; 5	POC	ISF; 15	DSF	**SLM**; 1*	**IRP**; 15*	KAN	13th	2315	
2020	Joe Gibbs Racing	18	Toyota	DAY	**PHO**; 3*	TAL	POC; 1*	IRP; 15	KEN; 1*	IOW; 1*	KAN	TOL; 2	**TOL**; 10*	MCH	DRC; 2	GTW; 1*	L44; 4	TOL; 3	BRI; 2	**WIN**; 1*	**MEM**; 1	ISF; 10	KAN; 14	5th	674	
2021	Joe Gibbs Racing	18	Toyota	DAY; 4	PHO; 1*	TAL; 27	**KAN**; 1**	**TOL**; 1*	**CLT**; 1**	MOH; 1*	**POC**; 2	**ELK**; 4*	BLN; 2*	**IOW**; 1*	WIN; 1	**GLN**; 3	**MCH**; 1*	ISF; 2	**MLW**; 1**	DSF; 2	**BRI**; 1*	**SLM**; 2*	**KAN**; 2*	1st	997	

==== ARCA Menards Series East ====
ARCA Menards Series East results
Year	Team	No.	Make	1	2	3	4	5	6	7	8	9	10	11	12	AMSEC	Pts	Ref
2019	DGR-Crosley	17	Toyota	NSM; 2	BRI	SBO	SBO	MEM; 2	NHA	IOW; 2	GLN; 4	BRI; 2	GTW			13th	172	
2019	DGR-Crosley	54	Toyota											NHA; 1*	DOV	13th	172	
2020	Joe Gibbs Racing	18	Toyota	NSM; 3	TOL; 1*	**DOV**; 12*	TOL; 3	BRI; 2	FIF; 3							2nd	350	
2021	Joe Gibbs Racing	18	Toyota	NSM	FIF	NSV	**DOV**; 1**	SNM	**IOW**; 1*	**MLW**; 1**	**BRI**; 1*					9th	246	

==== ARCA Menards Series West ====
ARCA Menards Series West results
Year	Team	No.	Make	1	2	3	4	5	6	7	8	9	10	11	12	13	14	AMSWC	Pts	Ref
2019	Levin Racing with Joe Gibbs Racing	40	Toyota	LVS	IRW	TUS	TUS	CNS	SON	DCS	IOW	EVG	GTW	MER	AAS	KCR	PHO; 1	34th	47	
2020	Joe Gibbs Racing	18	Toyota	LVS	MMP	MMP	IRW	EVG	DCS	CNS	LVS	AAS	KCR	PHO; 2*				19th	94	
2021	Joe Gibbs Racing	18	Toyota	PHO; 1*	SON	IRW	CNS	IRW	PIR	LVS	AAS	**PHO**; 1**						19th	98	

=== CARS Late Model Stock Car Tour ===
(key) (Bold – Pole position awarded by qualifying time. Italics – Pole position earned by points standings or practice time. * – Most laps led. ** – All laps led.)

CARS Late Model Stock Car Tour results
Year	Team	No.	Make	1	2	3	4	5	6	7	8	9	10	11	12	13	CLMSCTC	Pts	Ref
2017	Greg Marlowe	18G	Toyota	CNC	DOM	DOM	HCY; 12	HCY; 12	BRI	AND; 2	OCS	TCM; 14	ROU; 12		CNC; 12	SBO; 11	14th	170	
2017	Greg Marlowe	11G	Toyota											HCY; 19			14th	170	
2018	Greg Marlowe	18	Toyota	TCM; 19	MYB; 22*	ROU; 5	HCY; 11*	BRI; 4	ACE; 7	CCS; 5	KPT; 12	HCY; 27	WKS; 11	ROU; 16	SBO; 6		8th	258	
2019	Nelson Motorsports	18	Toyota	SNM	HCY; 27	ROU; 26	ACE	MMS	LGY	DOM	CCS	HCY	ROU	SBO			56th	13	

Sporting positions
Preceded by Bret Holmes	ARCA Menards Series Champion; 2021	Succeeded by Nick Sanchez
Preceded by Daniel Hemric	NASCAR Xfinity Series Champion; 2022	Succeeded by Cole Custer
