= 2025 Go Bowling at The Glen =

NASCAR Cup Series race

Race details
- Race 24 of 36 in the 2025 NASCAR Cup Series
- Date: August 10, 2025
- Location: Watkins Glen International in Watkins Glen, New York
- Course: Permanent racing facility
- Course length: 2.54 miles (2.48 km)
- Distance: 90 laps, 220.5 mi (354.6 km)
- Average speed: 101.263 miles per hour (162.967 km/h)

Pole position
Driver	Ryan Blaney	Team Penske
- Time: 1:11.960

Most laps led
Driver	Shane van Gisbergen	Trackhouse Racing
- Laps: 38

Fastest lap
Driver	Kyle Larson	Hendrick Motorsports
- Time: 1:13.203

Winner
No. 88	Shane van Gisbergen	Trackhouse Racing

Television in the United States
- Network: USA
- Announcers: Leigh Diffey, Jeff Burton and Steve Letarte

Radio in the United States
- Radio: MRN
- Booth announcers: Alex Hayden, Kurt Becker, and Todd Gordon
- Turn announcers: Dave Moody (Esses), Kyle Rickey (Turn 5) and Tim Catalfamo (Turns 6–7)

The 2025 Go Bowling at The Glen was a NASCAR Cup Series race that was held on August 10, 2025, at Watkins Glen International in Watkins Glen, New York. Contested over 90 laps on the 2.45-mile (3.94 km) road course, it was the 24th race of the 2025 NASCAR Cup Series season.

Shane van Gisbergen won the race. Christopher Bell finished 2nd, and Chris Buescher finished 3rd. William Byron and Chase Briscoe rounded out the top five, and Ryan Blaney, Daniel Suárez, Bubba Wallace, Tyler Reddick, and Ross Chastain rounded out the top ten.

== Report ==
=== Background ===
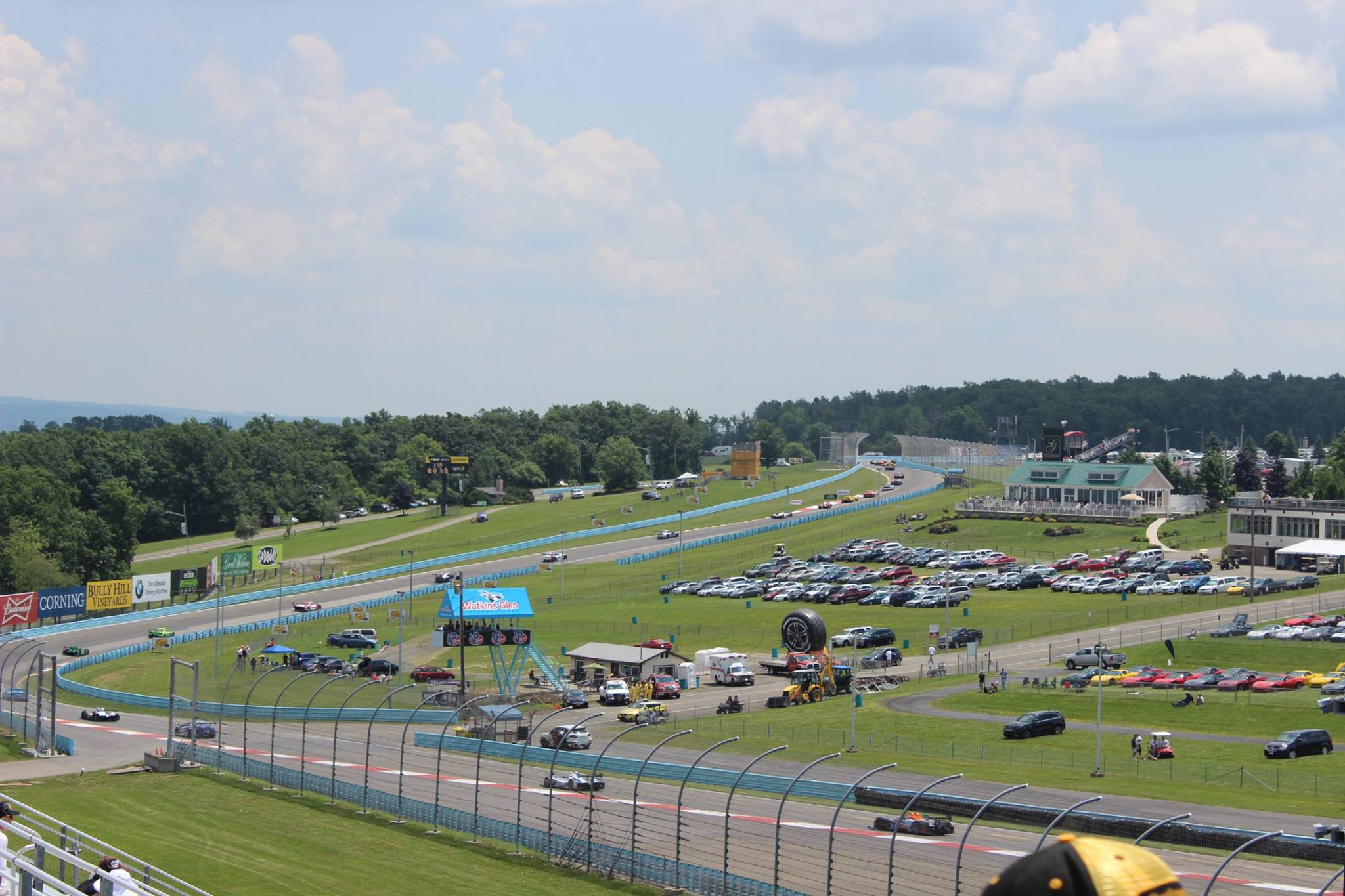
Watkins Glen International

Watkins Glen International (nicknamed "The Glen") is an automobile race track located in Watkins Glen, New York at the southern tip of Seneca Lake. It was long known around the world as the home of the Formula One United States Grand Prix, which it hosted for twenty consecutive years (1961–1980), but the site has been home to road racing of nearly every class, including the World Sportscar Championship, Trans-Am, Can-Am, NASCAR Cup Series, the International Motor Sports Association and the IndyCar Series.

Initially, public roads in the village were used for the race course. In 1956 a permanent circuit for the race was built. In 1968 the race was extended to six hours, becoming the 6 Hours of Watkins Glen. The circuit's current layout has more or less been the same since 1971, although a chicane was installed at the uphill Esses in 1975 to slow cars through these corners, where there was a fatality during practice at the 1973 United States Grand Prix. The chicane was removed in 1985, but another chicane called the "Inner Loop" was installed in 1992 after J.D. McDuffie's fatal accident during the previous year's NASCAR Winston Cup event.

The circuit is known as the Mecca of North American road racing and is a very popular venue among fans and drivers. The facility is currently owned by NASCAR.

==== Entry list ====
- (R) denotes rookie driver.
- (i) denotes driver who is ineligible for series driver points.

No.	Driver	Team	Manufacturer
1	Ross Chastain	Trackhouse Racing	Chevrolet
2	Austin Cindric	Team Penske	Ford
3	Austin Dillon	Richard Childress Racing	Chevrolet
4	Noah Gragson	Front Row Motorsports	Ford
5	Kyle Larson	Hendrick Motorsports	Chevrolet
6	Brad Keselowski	RFK Racing	Ford
7	Justin Haley	Spire Motorsports	Chevrolet
8	Kyle Busch	Richard Childress Racing	Chevrolet
9	Chase Elliott	Hendrick Motorsports	Chevrolet
10	Ty Dillon	Kaulig Racing	Chevrolet
11	Denny Hamlin	Joe Gibbs Racing	Toyota
12	Ryan Blaney	Team Penske	Ford
16	A. J. Allmendinger	Kaulig Racing	Chevrolet
17	Chris Buescher	RFK Racing	Ford
19	Chase Briscoe	Joe Gibbs Racing	Toyota
20	Christopher Bell	Joe Gibbs Racing	Toyota
21	Josh Berry	Wood Brothers Racing	Ford
22	Joey Logano	Team Penske	Ford
23	Bubba Wallace	23XI Racing	Toyota
24	William Byron	Hendrick Motorsports	Chevrolet
34	Todd Gilliland	Front Row Motorsports	Ford
35	Riley Herbst (R)	23XI Racing	Toyota
38	Zane Smith	Front Row Motorsports	Ford
41	Cole Custer	Haas Factory Team	Ford
42	John Hunter Nemechek	Legacy Motor Club	Toyota
43	Erik Jones	Legacy Motor Club	Toyota
44	J. J. Yeley	NY Racing Team	Chevrolet
45	Tyler Reddick	23XI Racing	Toyota
47	Ricky Stenhouse Jr.	Hyak Motorsports	Chevrolet
48	Alex Bowman	Hendrick Motorsports	Chevrolet
51	Cody Ware	Rick Ware Racing	Ford
54	Ty Gibbs	Joe Gibbs Racing	Toyota
60	Ryan Preece	RFK Racing	Ford
66	Josh Bilicki (i)	Garage 66	Ford
71	Michael McDowell	Spire Motorsports	Chevrolet
77	Carson Hocevar	Spire Motorsports	Chevrolet
78	Katherine Legge	Live Fast Motorsports	Chevrolet
87	Connor Zilisch (i)	Trackhouse Racing	Chevrolet
88	Shane van Gisbergen (R)	Trackhouse Racing	Chevrolet
99	Daniel Suárez	Trackhouse Racing	Chevrolet
Official entry list

== Practice ==
Justin Haley was the fastest in the practice session with a time of 1:12.674 seconds and a speed of 121.364 mph (195.316 km/h).

=== Practice results ===
Pos	No.	Driver	Team	Manufacturer	Time	Speed
1	7	Justin Haley	Spire Motorsports	Chevrolet	1:12.674	121.364
2	71	Michael McDowell	Spire Motorsports	Chevrolet	1:12.675	121.362
3	17	Chris Buescher	RFK Racing	Ford	1:12.678	121.357
Official practice results

== Qualifying ==
Ryan Blaney scored the pole for the race with a time of 1:11.960 and a speed of 122.568 mph (197.254 km/h).

=== Qualifying results ===
Pos	No.	Driver	Team	Manufacturer	Time	Speed
1	12	Ryan Blaney	Team Penske	Ford	1:11.960	122.568
2	88	Shane van Gisbergen (R)	Trackhouse Racing	Chevrolet	1:11.993	122.512
3	19	Chase Briscoe	Joe Gibbs Racing	Toyota	1:11.997	122.505
4	1	Ross Chastain	Trackhouse Racing	Chevrolet	1:12.081	122.362
5	8	Kyle Busch	Richard Childress Racing	Chevrolet	1:12.144	122.255
6	71	Michael McDowell	Spire Motorsports	Chevrolet	1:12.180	122.195
7	48	Alex Bowman	Hendrick Motorsports	Chevrolet	1:12.199	122.162
8	77	Carson Hocevar	Spire Motorsports	Chevrolet	1:12.200	122.161
9	20	Christopher Bell	Joe Gibbs Racing	Toyota	1:12.210	122.144
10	24	William Byron	Hendrick Motorsports	Chevrolet	1:12.215	122.135
11	22	Joey Logano	Team Penske	Ford	1:12.235	122.101
12	17	Chris Buescher	RFK Racing	Ford	1:12.265	122.051
13	2	Austin Cindric	Team Penske	Ford	1:12.300	121.992
14	54	Ty Gibbs	Joe Gibbs Racing	Toyota	1:12.304	121.985
15	23	Bubba Wallace	23XI Racing	Toyota	1:12.412	121.803
16	6	Brad Keselowski	RFK Racing	Ford	1:12.427	121.778
17	60	Ryan Preece	RFK Racing	Ford	1:12.443	121.751
18	16	A. J. Allmendinger	Kaulig Racing	Chevrolet	1:12.451	121.737
19	99	Daniel Suárez	Trackhouse Racing	Chevrolet	1:12.461	121.721
20	9	Chase Elliott	Hendrick Motorsports	Chevrolet	1:12.465	121.714
21	45	Tyler Reddick	23XI Racing	Toyota	1:12.487	121.677
22	11	Denny Hamlin	Joe Gibbs Racing	Toyota	1:12.507	121.643
23	7	Justin Haley	Spire Motorsports	Chevrolet	1:12.552	121.568
24	21	Josh Berry	Wood Brothers Racing	Ford	1:12.576	121.528
N/A	~~87~~	~~Connor Zilisch (i)~~	~~Trackhouse Racing~~	~~Chevrolet~~	~~1:12.603~~	~~121.483~~ (Note: After Zilisch won the day prior, he slipped off his car and broke his collarbone, forcing the No. 87 to withdraw.)
25	3	Austin Dillon	Richard Childress Racing	Chevrolet	1:12.667	121.376
26	5	Kyle Larson	Hendrick Motorsports	Chevrolet	1:12.718	121.290
27	34	Todd Gilliland	Front Row Motorsports	Ford	1:12.718	121.290
28	35	Riley Herbst (R)	23XI Racing	Toyota	1:12.736	121.260
29	43	Erik Jones	Legacy Motor Club	Toyota	1:12.764	121.214
30	42	John Hunter Nemechek	Legacy Motor Club	Toyota	1:12.838	121.091
31	41	Cole Custer	Haas Factory Team	Ford	1:12.923	120.949
32	10	Ty Dillon	Kaulig Racing	Chevrolet	1:12.989	120.840
33	38	Zane Smith	Front Row Motorsports	Ford	1:13.153	120.569
34	47	Ricky Stenhouse Jr.	Hyak Motorsports	Chevrolet	1:13.170	120.541
35	4	Noah Gragson	Front Row Motorsports	Ford	1:13.190	120.508
36	51	Cody Ware	Rick Ware Racing	Ford	1:13.698	119.678
37	78	Katherine Legge	Live Fast Motorsports	Chevrolet	1:14.504	118.383
38	44	J. J. Yeley (i)	NY Racing Team	Chevrolet	1:14.955	117.671
39	66	Josh Bilicki (i)	Garage 66	Ford	1:15.092	117.456
Official qualifying results

== Race ==
=== Race results ===
==== Stage results ====
Stage One Laps: 20

Pos	No	Driver	Team	Manufacturer	Points
1	17	Chris Buescher	RFK Racing	Ford	10
2	48	Alex Bowman	Hendrick Motorsports	Chevrolet	9
3	60	Ryan Preece	RFK Racing	Ford	8
4	9	Chase Elliott	Hendrick Motorsports	Chevrolet	7
5	42	John Hunter Nemechek	Legacy Motor Club	Toyota	6
6	47	Ricky Stenhouse Jr.	Hyak Motorsports	Chevrolet	5
7	12	Ryan Blaney	Team Penske	Ford	4
8	88	Shane van Gisbergen (R)	Trackhouse Racing	Chevrolet	3
9	19	Chase Briscoe	Joe Gibbs Racing	Toyota	2
10	51	Cody Ware	Rick Ware Racing	Ford	1
Official stage one results

Stage Two Laps: 20

Pos	No	Driver	Team	Manufacturer	Points
1	12	Ryan Blaney	Team Penske	Ford	10
2	24	William Byron	Hendrick Motorsports	Chevrolet	9
3	20	Christopher Bell	Joe Gibbs Racing	Toyota	8
4	16	A. J. Allmendinger	Kaulig Racing	Chevrolet	7
5	6	Brad Keselowski	RFK Racing	Ford	6
6	35	Riley Herbst (R)	23XI Racing	Toyota	5
7	48	Alex Bowman	Hendrick Motorsports	Chevrolet	4
8	47	Ricky Stenhouse Jr.	Hyak Motorsports	Chevrolet	3
9	54	Ty Gibbs	Joe Gibbs Racing	Toyota	2
10	60	Ryan Preece	RFK Racing	Ford	1
Official stage two results

=== Final Stage results ===
Stage Three Laps: 50

Pos	Grid	No	Driver	Team	Manufacturer	Laps	Points
1	2	88	Shane van Gisbergen (R)	Trackhouse Racing	Chevrolet	90	43
2	9	20	Christopher Bell	Joe Gibbs Racing	Toyota	90	43
3	12	17	Chris Buescher	RFK Racing	Ford	90	44
4	10	24	William Byron	Hendrick Motorsports	Chevrolet	90	42
5	3	19	Chase Briscoe	Joe Gibbs Racing	Toyota	90	34
6	1	12	Ryan Blaney	Team Penske	Ford	90	45
7	19	99	Daniel Suárez	Trackhouse Racing	Chevrolet	90	30
8	15	23	Bubba Wallace	23XI Racing	Toyota	90	29
9	21	45	Tyler Reddick	23XI Racing	Toyota	90	28
10	4	1	Ross Chastain	Trackhouse Racing	Chevrolet	90	27
11	18	16	A. J. Allmendinger	Kaulig Racing	Chevrolet	90	33
12	29	43	Erik Jones	Legacy Motor Club	Toyota	90	25
13	17	60	Ryan Preece	RFK Racing	Ford	90	33
14	11	22	Joey Logano	Team Penske	Ford	90	23
15	25	3	Austin Dillon	Richard Childress Racing	Chevrolet	90	22
16	13	2	Austin Cindric	Team Penske	Ford	90	21
17	33	38	Zane Smith	Front Row Motorsports	Ford	90	20
18	8	77	Carson Hocevar	Spire Motorsports	Chevrolet	90	19
19	6	71	Michael McDowell	Spire Motorsports	Chevrolet	90	18
20	7	48	Alex Bowman	Hendrick Motorsports	Chevrolet	90	30
21	35	4	Noah Gragson	Front Row Motorsports	Ford	90	16
22	5	8	Kyle Busch	Richard Childress Racing	Chevrolet	90	15
23	34	47	Ricky Stenhouse Jr.	Hyak Motorsports	Chevrolet	90	22
24	28	35	Riley Herbst (R)	23XI Racing	Toyota	90	18
25	22	11	Denny Hamlin	Joe Gibbs Racing	Toyota	90	12
26	20	9	Chase Elliott	Hendrick Motorsports	Chevrolet	90	18
27	23	7	Justin Haley	Spire Motorsports	Chevrolet	90	10
28	27	34	Todd Gilliland	Front Row Motorsports	Ford	90	9
29	36	51	Cody Ware	Rick Ware Racing	Ford	90	9
30	32	10	Ty Dillon	Kaulig Racing	Chevrolet	90	7
31	16	6	Brad Keselowski	RFK Racing	Ford	90	12
32	30	42	John Hunter Nemechek	Legacy Motor Club	Toyota	90	11
33	14	54	Ty Gibbs	Joe Gibbs Racing	Toyota	90	6
34	31	41	Cole Custer	Haas Factory Team	Ford	90	3
35	24	21	Josh Berry	Wood Brothers Racing	Ford	90	2
36	37	78	Katherine Legge	Live Fast Motorsports	Chevrolet	89	1
37	39	66	Josh Bilicki (i)	Garage 66	Ford	89	0
38	38	44	J. J. Yeley (i)	NY Racing Team	Ford	89	0
39	26	5	Kyle Larson	Hendrick Motorsports	Chevrolet	75	2
Official race results

=== Race statistics ===
- Lead changes: 8 among 6 different drivers
- Cautions/Laps: 3 for 8
- Red flags: 0
- Time of race: 2 hours, 10 minutes, and 39 seconds
- Average speed: 101.263 miles per hour (162.967 km/h)

== Media ==
=== Television ===
USA covered the race on the television side. Leigh Diffey, Jeff Burton, and Steve Letarte called the race from the broadcast booth. Dave Burns, Kim Coon, and Marty Snider handled the pit road duties from pit lane.

USA
Booth announcers	Pit reporters
Lap-by-lap: Leigh Diffey; Color-commentator: Jeff Burton; Color-commentator: Steve Letarte	Dave Burns; Kim Coon; Marty Snider

=== Radio ===
Motor Racing Network had the radio call for the race, which was also simulcast on Sirius XM NASCAR Radio. Alex Hayden, Kurt Becker and former crew chief Todd Gordon covered the action when the field raced down the front straightaway. Dave Moody called the race when the field raced thru the esses. Kyle Rickey covered the action when the field raced thru the inner loop and turn 5 and Tim Catalfamo covered the action in turn 6 & 7. Steve Post and Chris Wilner called the action from the pits for MRN.

MRN
Booth announcers	Turn announcers	Pit reporters
Lead announcer: Alex Hayden; Announcer: Kurt Becker; Announcer: Todd Gordon	Esses: Dave Moody; Inner loop & Turn 5: Kyle Rickey; Turn 6 & 7: Tim Catalfamo	Steve Post; Chris Wilner

== Standings after the race ==
Drivers' Championship standings

	Pos	Driver	Points
	1	William Byron	812
	2	Chase Elliott	770 (–42)
1	3	Denny Hamlin	731 (–81)
1	4	Christopher Bell	727 (–85)
2	5	Kyle Larson	727 (–85)
1	6	Ryan Blaney	710 (–102)
1	7	Tyler Reddick	701 (–111)
	8	Chase Briscoe	674 (–138)
	9	Alex Bowman	644 (–168)
1	10	Chris Buescher	618 (–194)
1	11	Bubba Wallace	610 (–202)
1	12	Ryan Preece	584 (–228)
	13	Joey Logano	583 (–229)
	14	Ross Chastain	571 (–241)
	15	Kyle Busch	516 (–296)
1	16	Austin Cindric	502 (–310)
Official driver's standings

Manufacturers' Championship standings

Pos	Manufacturer	Points
1	Chevrolet	885
2	Toyota	861 (–24)
3	Ford	798 (–87)

- Note: Only the first 16 positions are included for the driver standings.
- . – Driver has clinched a position in the NASCAR Cup Series playoffs.

== Notes ==
Previous race: 2025 Iowa Corn 350	NASCAR Cup Series; 2025 season	Next race: 2025 Cook Out 400 (Richmond)
