= Iowa Speedway =

Motorsport track in the United States

- D-shaped Oval (2006–present)
- Location: 3333 Rusty Wallace Drive, Newton, Iowa, United States, 50208
- Coordinates: 41°40′40″N 93°0′52″W
- Capacity: 30,000
- Owner: NASCAR (November 2013–present); Clement family (July 2011–November 2013); U.S. MotorSport Entertainment (September 2006–July 2011)
- Broke ground: June 21, 2005; 21 years ago
- Opened: September 15, 2006; 20 years ago
- Construction cost: $70 million USD
- Major events: Current: NASCAR Cup Series; Iowa Corn 350 (2024–present); NASCAR O'Reilly Auto Parts Series; Hy-Vee PERKS 250 (2011–2019, 2024–present); U.S. Cellular 250 (2009–2019); Former: IndyCar Series; Synk 275 Powered by Sukup (2007–2020, 2022–2025); Farm to Finish 275 Powered by Sukup (2020, 2022–2025); NASCAR Truck Series; M&M's 200 (2009–2019); Fan Appreciation 200 (2012–2013); Rolex Sports Car Series (2007)
- Website: iowaspeedway.com

D-shaped Oval (2006–present)
- Surface: Asphalt
- Length: 0.875 mi (1.408 km)
- Turns: 4
- Banking: Turns: 12–14° Frontstretch: 10° Backstretch: 4°
- Race lap record: 0:17.4908 ( (Australia) Ryan Briscoe, Dallara IR-04, 2008, IndyCar)

Road Course (2006–present)
- Surface: Asphalt
- Length: 1.300 mi (2.092 km)
- Turns: 9
- Banking: Turns 1–2: 12–14° Frontstretch: 10° Backstretch: 4°
- Race lap record: 0:41.624 ( (Canada) Michael Valiante, Riley MkXI, 2007, DP)

Iowa Speedway is a 0.875 mi (1.408 km) (Note: Length disputed; IndyCar uses a length of 0.894 mi (1.439 km).) oval short track in Newton, Iowa, United States. Along with the main track, the track complex also features seven road course layouts, including a 1.300 mi (2.092 km) road course layout that combines parts of the main track along with the infield road course to make a "roval". Since its inaugural season of racing in 2006, the track has hosted a variety of racing events, including events sanctioned by NASCAR and IndyCar. Iowa Speedway is currently owned by NASCAR and led by track president Eric Peterson.

After an initial proposal to build a 1.000 mi (1.609 km) track by businessmen Jerry Lowrie and Larry Clement failed in the early 2000s, in 2003, the Paul Schlaack-owned U.S. Motorsport Entertainment Corporation made a bid to build a shorter facility. After another delay due to a perceived lack of funds that lasted throughout 2004, groundbreaking commenced in mid-2005, with the facility holding its first races in September 2006. The sanctioning body of NASCAR later bought the track in 2013 to save the facility from financial issues.

== Description ==
=== Configurations ===
The speedway in its current form is measured at 0.875 mi (1.408 km), with 10 degrees of banking in the frontstretch, four degrees in the backstretch, and a progressive banking system utilized from 12 to 14 degrees in the turns. Varying sanctioning bodies have disputed the length of the track; NASCAR's official measurement is at 0.875 mi (1.408 km), while IndyCar measures the track at 0.894 mi (1.439 km).

Along with the main track's construction, road course layouts that combined the main track with dedicated infield portions were constructed, with developers making seven road course layouts.

=== Amenities ===
The facility is served by Interstate 80, and is approximately 35 mi (56 km) east from the Iowa capital of Des Moines. According to a 2023 report by The Des Moines Register, it holds 30,000 seats. In a 2006 Autoweek report, the track constructed 28 luxury suites; in recent years, extra temporary suites for its IndyCar races were developed by Hy-Vee.

== Track history ==
=== Planning and construction ===
==== Jerry Lowrie and Larry Clement failed proposal ====
In November 2000, Kentucky Speedway developer Jerry Carroll proposed to the Jasper County board of supervisors plans to build a $76 million, 40,000-seat, 1 mile (1.6 km) track in Newton, Iowa. With the proposal, Carroll sought for the county to issue $30-40 million worth of bonds to fund the project, along with seeking as much as an additional $35 million from the Vision Iowa program, a state economic growth program. However, by January 2001, Carroll abandoned the plan to focus on developing the Kentucky Speedway. As a result, California businessman Jerry Lowrie opted to replace Carroll in directing the project. Lowrie decided to decline to ask the county for bonds. The project drew support from Newton mayor David Aldridge, but later saw opposition from residents near the proposed site. The opposition claimed that building the site would be a nuisance for the rural residents and later tacked on Lowrie's unproven record of success.

An approval from Vision Iowa was considered critical for the project to survive, with developers hoping to secure $20 million. However, by August, the remaining available funding from Vision Iowa dropped lower than the amount needed. The next month, Lowrie abandoned the project to focus on building a speedway in California, leaving the project to be led by race team owner Larry Clement. Although Clement claimed that by October he had commitment from private anonymous investors totaling $7-10 million, Vision Iowa leaders refused to still give the remaining money, claiming that they did not feel that sufficient proof of total commitment from investors had been provided, with Vision Iowa demanding that the identities of the investors be released. The funding was rejected by the fall of 2002.

==== U.S. MotorSport Entertainment Corporation bid, delays, eventual construction ====
On April 16, 2003, the Newton City Council unanimously approved a proposed project for a $30 million, 0.875 mi (1.408 km), 25,000-seat, multi-use racing facility headed by the U.S. MotorSport Entertainment Corporation and its CEO, Paul Schlaack. The project proposal planned to build it near Interstate 80, with Newton officials in charge of approving the project rather than those from Jasper County. However, although the city planned to invest $9 million into the facility, they opted to wait to build the track until Schlaack found enough investors for the project. In June, NASCAR driver Rusty Wallace was announced as the leading designer of the project. Schlaack unveiled plans in October, with the city now investing a planned $17.3 million with stated hopes of an opening date in 2005. Although plans were made to hold groundbreaking in spring of 2004, construction was delayed in June due to a lack of funds for the now-$50 million project.

In February 2005, progress on the project resumed when developers announced that they had gathered enough funds; by this point, the budget had increased to $70 million, and the opening year was delayed until 2006. The developers later sought to pass a ten-year sales tax break bill; the proposed bill was the first of its kind proposed in the state of Iowa. The bill drew bipartisan support from the Iowa General Assembly, and was passed from committee in late March. However, while the bill was supported by then-Governor of Iowa Tom Vilsack, the bill drew worries of draining the state's tax revenue based on future precedent, with Vilsack suggesting to retool the bill. It passed the Iowa House of Representatives on April 12, and was later approved by Vilsack on May 4. The project received further support with a promise from the Georgia-based UBG Financial Corporation to lend up to $57 million for the project; although, it was met with skepticism due to claims of finding "little physical evidence of [the] company".

Groundbreaking was held on June 21, 2005. The project was met with optimism, as the economic impact of the facility for the city of Newton was seen as a satisfactory boost for a stagnating city; especially since the biggest employer of the city, Maytag, had begun major layoffs at its Newton factory. By August, Todd Melfi was appointed as the track's general manager. In mid-October, the track confirmed racing dates for the 2006 season with ARCA Re/Max Series and United States Auto Club (USAC)-sanctioned events, with a Hooters Pro Cup Series race being scheduled to christen the facility on September 15, 2006. Two months later, developers secured a $40 million loan from Wells Fargo in replacement of UBG Financial, who seemingly abandoned the project. By April 2006, developers stated hopes of expanding the area to include a water park and a hotel nearby the facility. After the Maytag factory closed in May, the facility was depended on heavily by the Newton area to replace the economic bloodline of the city. In June, the facility was rumored to hold an Indy Racing League (IRL) race weekend for 2007; the report was confirmed in August.

=== First events, sales to Clement family and NASCAR ===
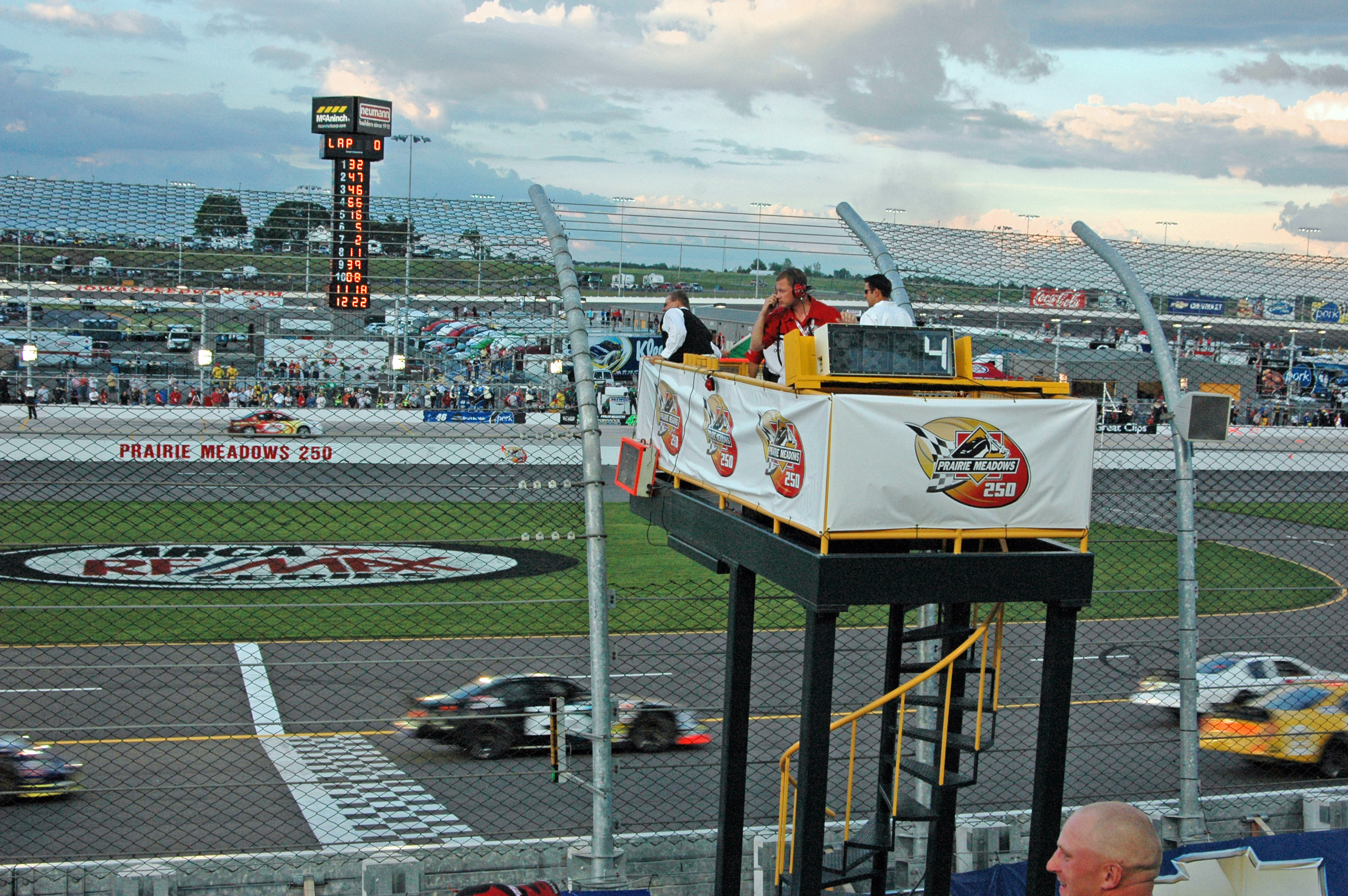
The Iowa Speedway in June 2007.

The facility opened as scheduled on September 15, 2006, with Woody Howard winning the first race at the track. The race and its preliminary sessions were marred with excessive tire wear, with mandatory competition cautions being implemented prior to the event. Three weeks later, the facility held its first music festival. The next year, the facility held its first IRL race, with Dario Franchitti winning the first major race at the facility. In late February 2008, chief financial officer Jerry Jauron replaced Stan Clement as the track's president. That same year, the facility was awarded annual NASCAR races for 2009, with the NASCAR Nationwide Series (now known as the NASCAR O'Reilly Auto Parts Series) and the NASCAR Craftsman Truck Series.

Three years later, in accordance with a plan to transfer ownership of the track within five years, U.S. MotorSport Entertainment sold controlling interest of the facility to the Clement family, a family from Newton. Jauron left shortly thereafter in September, handing over the track's control to Doug Fritz, the senior director of marketing for NASCAR. In 2013, the track sought an $8 million grant from the Iowa General Assembly to improve amenities, but failed. In the same year, the track was found to be in financial trouble, with the facility being late on bill payments. As a result, Fritz resigned, with track management claiming that the track was seeking a refinancing deal in early September. Two months later, The Des Moines Register reported that the facility had been sold to the sanctioning body of NASCAR for $10 million, with Jimmy Small taking over Fritz's position of leadership.

With the purchase of the track, NASCAR chairman Brian France stated hopes of the facility hosting a Nationwide Series version of the NASCAR All-Star Race; he also said that he was not interested in giving the facility a Cup Series date as the schedule was "full". In February 2018, David Hyatt, the former president of the Motor Racing Network (MRN), replaced Small as the president of the track. Hyatt stated hopes of expanding the facility, along with obtaining a NASCAR Cup Series weekend; particularly, the NASCAR All-Star Race. By the following year, Hyatt claimed that Iowa Speedway had high chances of being awarded a Cup Series date in 2021.

=== Reported proposed sale, resurgence ===
Due to the COVID-19 pandemic, the track's races for 2020 were either canceled or run with fewer spectators. By mid-2020, journalist Robin Miller reported rumors that racing mogul Roger Penske was hoping to buy the facility to keep it on the IndyCar schedule; the facility was also rumored to be in financial trouble. Other rumors were also made at the same time that the track was going to be closed down. The rumors of closing were repelled by former general manager Craig Armstrong, who claimed that although the facility would not host any NASCAR or IndyCar races in 2021, the situation was a "temporary setback", with the track still hoping to host club racing events. When the track reopened to full capacity in July 2021 for the ARCA Menards Series, attendance was reported at 5,000, putting future events in jeopardy. However, a month later, IndyCar announced its return to the facility in 2022, this time with a doubleheader event.

On October 2, 2023, reports by The Athletic claimed that NASCAR, in seeking a replacement for a failed attempt of trying to lure a Cup Series weekend at the Circuit Gilles Villeneuve for the 2024 season, opted to choose Iowa Speedway as a backup option. The decision was confirmed a day later, with the facility slated to hold its first Cup Series races since its opening. In February 2024, Eric Peterson, a NASCAR regional director for corporate sales, was appointed to replace Hyatt as the track's president.

On August 4, 2026, it was announced that the speedway would be getting a US$20 million renovation that includes resurfacing the track and fanzone areas before the 2027 race.

== Events ==
=== Racing ===
==== NASCAR ====
The facility hosts an annual NASCAR weekend featuring the NASCAR Cup Series' Iowa Corn 350 and the NASCAR O'Reilly Auto Parts Series' Hy-Vee PERKS 250. From 2009 to 2019, the track also hosted the Xfinity Series and Gander Outdoors Truck Series events. From 2012 to 2013, the track held a second Truck Series race with the Fan Appreciation 200.

==== IndyCar ====
The Indy Racing League (now known as the IndyCar Series) announced their intentions to run annual IndyCar races at the facility in 2006, with the first races being run in 2007. In 2020, as a result of the COVID-19 pandemic, IndyCar opted to run a doubleheader at the facility. IndyCar decided to stick with the doubleheader format when the series resumed racing at the facility in 2022.

==== Other racing events ====
The facility has played host to a variety races hosted by varying sanctioning bodies, including the ARCA Menards Series, the Rolex Sports Car Series, the Pro Mazda Championship, and the USF2000 Championship.

== Lap records ==
As of August 2025, the fastest official race lap records of the Iowa Speedway are listed as:

Category	Time	Driver	Vehicle	Event
D-Shaped Oval (2006–present): 0.875 mi (1.408 km)
IndyCar	0:17.4908	(Australia) Ryan Briscoe	Dallara IR-04	2008 Iowa Corn Indy 250
Indy NXT	0:19.2168	(Brazil) Caio Collet	Dallara IL-15	2024 Iowa 100
Star Mazda	0:22.052	(United States) Sage Karam	Star Formula Mazda 'Pro'	2012 Iowa Star Mazda round
NASCAR Xfinity	0:23.341	(United States) Chandler Smith	Toyota GR Supra NASCAR	2024 Hy-Vee PERKS 250
NASCAR Cup	0:23.362	(United States) Alex Bowman	Chevrolet Camaro ZL1	2024 Iowa Corn 350
ARCA Menards	0:23.536	(United States) Brenden Queen	Chevrolet Camaro SS	2025 Atlas 150
NASCAR Truck	0:23.747	(United States) Chandler Smith	Toyota Tundra	2019 M&M's 200
US F2000	0:23.881	(United States) Sage Karam	Van Diemen DP08	2010 Iowa US F2000 round
Road Course (2006–present): 1.300 mi (2.092 km)
DP	0:41.624	(Canada) Michael Valiante	Riley MkXI	2007 Iowa 400k
Grand-Am GT	0:45.663	(United States) Kelly Collins	Pontiac GXP.R	2007 Iowa 400k
