= 2024 Food City 500 =

Race details
- Race 5 of 36 in the 2024 NASCAR Cup Series
- Date: March 17, 2024
- Location: Bristol Motor Speedway in Bristol, Tennessee
- Course: Permanent racing facility
- Course length: 0.533 miles (0.858 km)
- Distance: 500 laps, 266.5 mi (428.890 km)
- Average speed: 79.678 miles per hour (128.229 km/h)

Pole position
Driver	Ryan Blaney	Team Penske
- Time: 15.356

Most laps led
Driver	Denny Hamlin	Joe Gibbs Racing
- Laps: 163

Winner
No. 11	Denny Hamlin	Joe Gibbs Racing

Television in the United States
- Network: Fox
- Announcers: Mike Joy, Clint Bowyer, and Kevin Harvick

Radio in the United States
- Radio: PRN
- Booth announcers: Doug Rice and Mark Garrow
- Turn announcers: Rob Albright (Backstretch)

The 2024 Food City 500 was a NASCAR Cup Series race held on March 17, 2024, at Bristol Motor Speedway in Bristol, Tennessee. Contested over 500 laps on the 0.533 miles (0.858 km) short track, it was the fifth race of the 2024 NASCAR Cup Series season. Denny Hamlin won the race. Martin Truex Jr. finished 2nd, and Brad Keselowski finished 3rd. Alex Bowman and Kyle Larson rounded out the top five, and John Hunter Nemechek, Chris Buescher, Chase Elliott, Ty Gibbs, and Christopher Bell rounded out the top ten.

The race achieved prominent attention because of the combination of very serious tire wear to where drivers slowed their pace up to three seconds a lap and rampant passing to where the lead changed a NASCAR short track record 54 times.

On August 22, 2024, Hamlin's team was fined $100,000 (officially assessed to crew chief Chris Gabehart), with Hamlin and the No. 11 team stripped of all points from the race, and 31 additional points (75 points overall lost) when Toyota admitted they violated NASCAR's sealed engine policy by rebuilding the race-winning engine in their Costa Mesa, California factory before NASCAR could inspect it. Under NASCAR regulations, teams must reuse an engine multiple times during the year, including the final race of the season.

== Report ==
=== Background ===
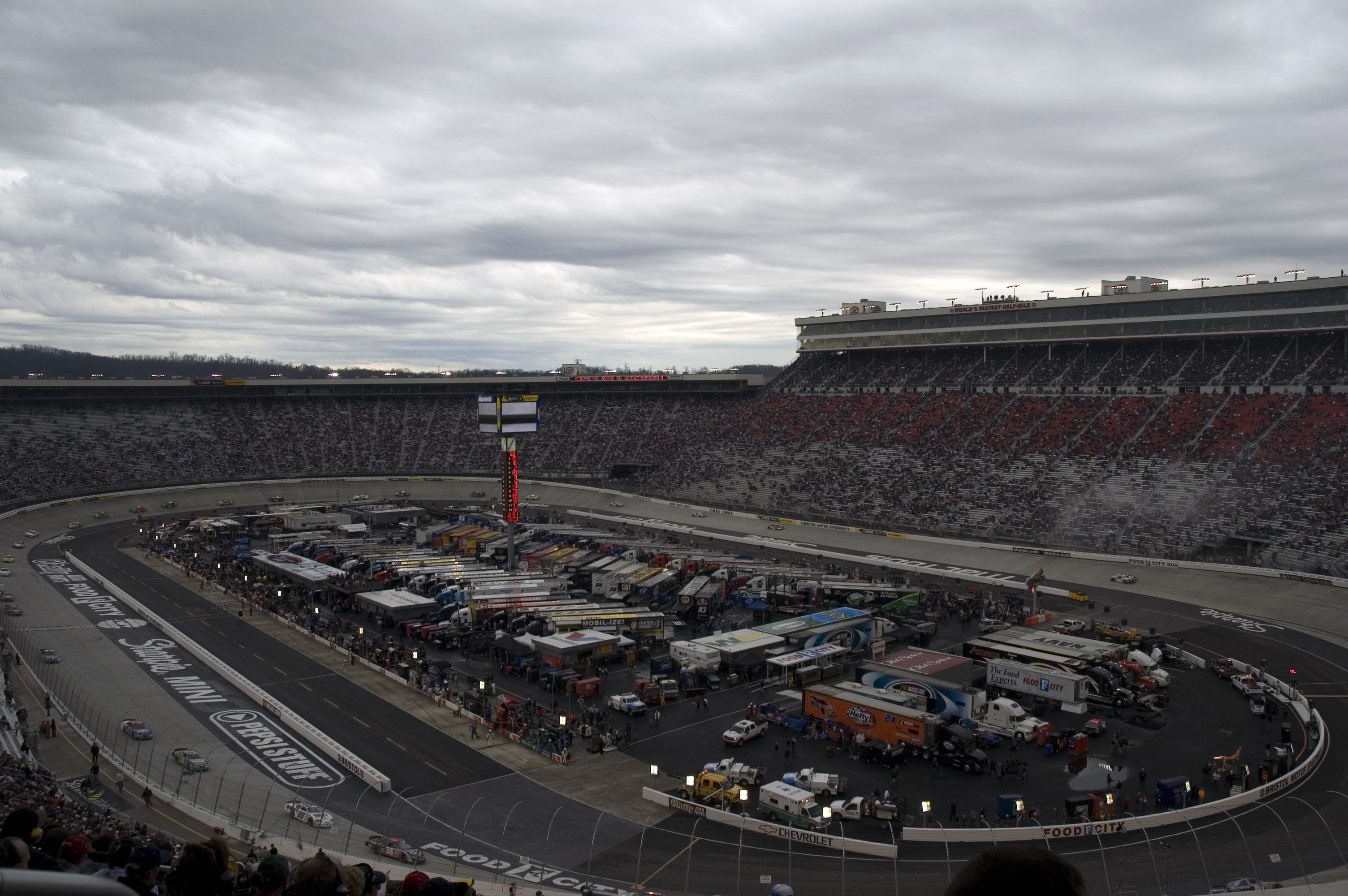
Bristol Motor Speedway, the track where the race was held.

Bristol Motor Speedway, formerly known as Bristol International Raceway and Bristol Raceway, is a NASCAR short track venue located in Bristol, Tennessee. Constructed in 1960, it held its first NASCAR race on July 30, 1961. Bristol is among the most popular tracks on the NASCAR schedule because of its distinct features, which include extraordinarily steep banking combined with short length, an all concrete surface, two pit roads, and stadium-like seating.

In 2021, the race shifted to a dirt surface version of the track and was renamed the Food City Dirt Race.

On September 15, 2023, Bristol Motor Speedway announced that the race would return to being run on concrete.

==== Entry list ====
- (R) denotes rookie driver.
- (i) denotes driver who is ineligible for series driver points.

No.	Driver	Team	Manufacturer
1	Ross Chastain	Trackhouse Racing	Chevrolet
2	Austin Cindric	Team Penske	Ford
3	Austin Dillon	Richard Childress Racing	Chevrolet
4	Josh Berry (R)	Stewart–Haas Racing	Ford
5	Kyle Larson	Hendrick Motorsports	Chevrolet
6	Brad Keselowski	RFK Racing	Ford
7	Corey LaJoie	Spire Motorsports	Chevrolet
8	Kyle Busch	Richard Childress Racing	Chevrolet
9	Chase Elliott	Hendrick Motorsports	Chevrolet
10	Noah Gragson	Stewart–Haas Racing	Ford
11	Denny Hamlin	Joe Gibbs Racing	Toyota
12	Ryan Blaney	Team Penske	Ford
14	Chase Briscoe	Stewart–Haas Racing	Ford
15	Kaz Grala (R)	Rick Ware Racing	Ford
16	A. J. Allmendinger (i)	Kaulig Racing	Chevrolet
17	Chris Buescher	RFK Racing	Ford
19	Martin Truex Jr.	Joe Gibbs Racing	Toyota
20	Christopher Bell	Joe Gibbs Racing	Toyota
21	Harrison Burton	Wood Brothers Racing	Ford
22	Joey Logano	Team Penske	Ford
23	Bubba Wallace	23XI Racing	Toyota
24	William Byron	Hendrick Motorsports	Chevrolet
31	Daniel Hemric	Kaulig Racing	Chevrolet
34	Michael McDowell	Front Row Motorsports	Ford
38	Todd Gilliland	Front Row Motorsports	Ford
41	Ryan Preece	Stewart–Haas Racing	Ford
42	John Hunter Nemechek	Legacy Motor Club	Toyota
43	Erik Jones	Legacy Motor Club	Toyota
45	Tyler Reddick	23XI Racing	Toyota
47	Ricky Stenhouse Jr.	JTG Daugherty Racing	Chevrolet
48	Alex Bowman	Hendrick Motorsports	Chevrolet
51	Justin Haley	Rick Ware Racing	Ford
54	Ty Gibbs	Joe Gibbs Racing	Toyota
71	Zane Smith (R)	Spire Motorsports	Chevrolet
77	Carson Hocevar (R)	Spire Motorsports	Chevrolet
99	Daniel Suárez	Trackhouse Racing	Chevrolet
Official entry list

== Practice ==
Ryan Blaney was the fastest in the practice session with a time of 15.028 seconds and a speed of 127.682 mph (205.484 km/h).

=== Practice results ===
Pos	No.	Driver	Team	Manufacturer	Time	Speed
1	12	Ryan Blaney	Team Penske	Ford	15.028	127.682
2	8	Kyle Busch	Richard Childress Racing	Chevrolet	15.110	126.989
3	23	Bubba Wallace	23XI Racing	Toyota	15.118	126.922
Official practice results

== Qualifying ==
Ryan Blaney scored the pole for the race with a time of 15.356 and a speed of 124.954 mph (201.094 km/h).

=== Qualifying results ===
Pos	No.	Driver	Team	Manufacturer	R1	R2
1	12	Ryan Blaney	Team Penske	Ford	15.134	15.356
2	4	Josh Berry (R)	Stewart-Haas Racing	Ford	15.297	15.376
3	11	Denny Hamlin	Joe Gibbs Racing	Toyota	15.165	15.452
4	22	Joey Logano	Team Penske	Ford	15.387	15.506
5	9	Chase Elliott	Hendrick Motorsports	Chevrolet	15.213	15.615
6	14	Chase Briscoe	Stewart-Haas Racing	Ford	15.165	15.618
7	34	Michael McDowell	Front Row Motorsports	Ford	15.384	15.714
8	24	William Byron	Hendrick Motorsports	Chevrolet	15.405	15.771
9	23	Bubba Wallace	23XI Racing	Toyota	15.260	15.778
10	5	Kyle Larson	Hendrick Motorsports	Chevrolet	15.209	16.743
11	19	Martin Truex Jr.	Joe Gibbs Racing	Toyota	15.335	—
12	20	Christopher Bell	Joe Gibbs Racing	Toyota	15.414	—
13	21	Harrison Burton	Wood Brothers Racing	Ford	15.353	—
14	8	Kyle Busch	Richard Childress Racing	Chevrolet	15.437	—
15	43	Erik Jones	Legacy Motor Club	Toyota	15.359	—
16	71	Zane Smith (R)	Spire Motorsports	Chevrolet	15.490	—
17	6	Brad Keselowski	RFK Racing	Ford	15.382	—
18	7	Corey LaJoie	Spire Motorsports	Chevrolet	15.496	—
19	54	Ty Gibbs	Joe Gibbs Racing	Toyota	15.399	—
20	31	Daniel Hemric	Kaulig Racing	Chevrolet	15.575	—
21	2	Austin Cindric	Team Penske	Ford	15.422	—
22	10	Noah Gragson	Stewart-Haas Racing	Ford	15.586	—
23	45	Tyler Reddick	23XI Racing	Toyota	15.468	—
24	38	Todd Gilliland	Front Row Motorsports	Ford	15.645	—
25	41	Ryan Preece	Stewart-Haas Racing	Ford	15.474	—
26	42	John Hunter Nemechek	Legacy Motor Club	Toyota	15.663	—
27	47	Ricky Stenhouse Jr.	JTG Daugherty Racing	Chevrolet	15.488	—
28	99	Daniel Suárez	Trackhouse Racing	Chevrolet	15.756	—
29	48	Alex Bowman	Hendrick Motorsports	Chevrolet	15.505	—
30	16	A. J. Allmendinger (i)	Kaulig Racing	Chevrolet	15.848	—
31	3	Austin Dillon	Richard Childress Racing	Chevrolet	15.534	—
32	51	Justin Haley	Rick Ware Racing	Ford	15.916	—
33	15	Kaz Grala (R)	Rick Ware Racing	Ford	15.694	—
34	17	Chris Buescher	RFK Racing	Ford	16.078	—
35	77	Carson Hocevar (R)	Spire Motorsports	Chevrolet	15.846	—
36	1	Ross Chastain	Trackhouse Racing	Chevrolet	16.096	—
Official qualifying results

== Race ==
=== Race results ===
==== Stage Results ====
Stage One Laps: 125

Pos	No	Driver	Team	Manufacturer	Points
1	54	Ty Gibbs	Joe Gibbs Racing	Toyota	10
2	5	Kyle Larson	Hendrick Motorsports	Chevrolet	9
3	17	Chris Buescher	RFK Racing	Ford	8
4	6	Brad Keselowski	RFK Racing	Ford	7
5	42	John Hunter Nemechek	Legacy Motor Club	Toyota	6
6	12	Ryan Blaney	Team Penske	Ford	5
7	19	Martin Truex Jr.	Joe Gibbs Racing	Toyota	4
8	20	Christopher Bell	Joe Gibbs Racing	Toyota	3
9	41	Ryan Preece	Stewart-Haas Racing	Ford	2
10	4	Josh Berry (R)	Stewart-Haas Racing	Ford	1
Official stage one results

Stage Two Laps: 125

Pos	No	Driver	Team	Manufacturer	Points
1	54	Ty Gibbs	Joe Gibbs Racing	Toyota	10
2	6	Brad Keselowski	RFK Racing	Ford	9
3	22	Joey Logano	Team Penske	Ford	8
4	42	John Hunter Nemechek	Legacy Motor Club	Toyota	7
5	20	Christopher Bell	Joe Gibbs Racing	Toyota	6
6	19	Martin Truex Jr.	Joe Gibbs Racing	Toyota	5
7	11	Denny Hamlin	Joe Gibbs Racing	Toyota	--
8	5	Kyle Larson	Hendrick Motorsports	Chevrolet	3
9	23	Bubba Wallace	23XI Racing	Toyota	2
10	41	Ryan Preece	Stewart-Haas Racing	Ford	1
Official stage two results

=== Final Stage Results ===
Stage Three Laps: 250

Pos	Grid	No	Driver	Team	Manufacturer	Laps	Points
1	3	11	Denny Hamlin	Joe Gibbs Racing	Toyota	500	-31 (Note: During the August Daytona round, it was discovered before NASCAR could inspect the race winning engine (which was scheduled to be used in a further race according to NASCAR regulations), the Toyota factory had disassembled the engine. NASCAR penalised driver and team 75 points, so his score is -31 from this race.)
2	11	19	Martin Truex Jr.	Joe Gibbs Racing	Toyota	500	44
3	17	6	Brad Keselowski	RFK Racing	Ford	500	50
4	29	48	Alex Bowman	Hendrick Motorsports	Chevrolet	500	33
5	10	5	Kyle Larson	Hendrick Motorsports	Chevrolet	500	44
6	26	42	John Hunter Nemechek	Legacy Motor Club	Toyota	499	44
7	34	17	Chris Buescher	RFK Racing	Ford	499	38
8	5	9	Chase Elliott	Hendrick Motorsports	Chevrolet	499	29
9	19	54	Ty Gibbs	Joe Gibbs Racing	Toyota	499	48
10	12	20	Christopher Bell	Joe Gibbs Racing	Toyota	499	36
11	7	34	Michael McDowell	Front Row Motorsports	Ford	499	26
12	2	4	Josh Berry (R)	Stewart-Haas Racing	Ford	499	26
13	6	14	Chase Briscoe	Stewart-Haas Racing	Ford	498	24
14	25	41	Ryan Preece	Stewart-Haas Racing	Ford	498	26
15	36	1	Ross Chastain	Trackhouse Racing	Chevrolet	498	22
16	1	12	Ryan Blaney	Team Penske	Ford	498	26
17	32	51	Justin Haley	Rick Ware Racing	Ford	498	20
18	28	99	Daniel Suárez	Trackhouse Racing	Chevrolet	498	19
19	33	15	Kaz Grala (R)	Rick Ware Racing	Ford	498	18
20	15	43	Erik Jones	Legacy Motor Club	Toyota	498	17
21	18	7	Corey LaJoie	Spire Motorsports	Chevrolet	498	16
22	4	22	Joey Logano	Team Penske	Ford	498	23
23	30	16	A. J. Allmendinger (i)	Kaulig Racing	Chevrolet	498	0
24	31	3	Austin Dillon	Richard Childress Racing	Chevrolet	498	13
25	14	8	Kyle Busch	Richard Childress Racing	Chevrolet	498	12
26	24	38	Todd Gilliland	Front Row Motorsports	Ford	497	11
27	35	77	Carson Hocevar (R)	Spire Motorsports	Chevrolet	497	10
28	20	31	Daniel Hemric	Kaulig Racing	Chevrolet	496	9
29	9	23	Bubba Wallace	23XI Racing	Toyota	496	10
30	23	45	Tyler Reddick	23XI Racing	Toyota	495	7
31	21	2	Austin Cindric	Team Penske	Ford	495	6
32	13	21	Harrison Burton	Wood Brothers Racing	Ford	495	5
33	27	47	Ricky Stenhouse Jr.	JTG Daugherty Racing	Chevrolet	495	4
34	22	10	Noah Gragson	Stewart-Haas Racing	Ford	494	3
35	8	24	William Byron	Hendrick Motorsports	Chevrolet	492	2
36	16	71	Zane Smith (R)	Spire Motorsports	Chevrolet	192	1
Official race results

=== Race statistics ===
- Lead changes: 54 among 16 different drivers
- Cautions/Laps: 9 for 98 laps
- Red flags: 0
- Time of race: 3 hours, 20 minutes and 41 seconds
- Average speed: 79.678 miles per hour (128.229 km/h)

== Media ==
=== Television ===
The Food City 500 was carried by Fox in the United States. Mike Joy, Clint Bowyer, and three-time Bristol winner Kevin Harvick called the race from the broadcast booth. Jamie Little and Regan Smith handled pit road for the television side, and Larry McReynolds provided insight from the Fox Sports studio in Charlotte.

Fox
Booth announcers	Pit reporters	In-race analyst
Lap-by-lap: Mike Joy; Color-commentator: Clint Bowyer; Color-commentator: Kevin Harvick	Jamie Little; Regan Smith	Larry McReynolds

=== Radio ===
PRN had the radio call for the race which was simulcasted on Sirius XM NASCAR Radio. Doug Rice and Mark Garrow called the race in the booth when the field raced down the frontstretch. Rob Albright called the race from atop the turn 3 suites when the field raced down the backstretch. Brad Gillie, Brett McMillan and Wendy Venturini covered the action on pit lane for PRN.

PRN
Booth announcers	Turn announcers	Pit reporters
Lead announcer: Doug Rice; Announcer: Mark Garrow	Backstretch: Rob Albright	Brad Gillie; Brett McMillan; Wendy Venturini

== Standings after the race ==
Drivers' Championship standings

	Pos	Driver	Points
1	1	Kyle Larson	185
1	2	Martin Truex Jr.	185 (–0)
3	3	Ty Gibbs	178 (–7)
3	4	Ryan Blaney	177 (–8)
3	5	Denny Hamlin	173 (–12)
3	6	Chase Elliott	152 (–33)
	7	Ross Chastain	151 (–34)
4	8	Christopher Bell	138 (–47)
4	9	Tyler Reddick	137 (–48)
6	10	William Byron	136 (–49)
1	11	Daniel Suárez	133 (–52)
1	12	Alex Bowman	132 (–53)
9	13	Brad Keselowski	125 (–60)
2	14	Chris Buescher	124 (–61)
6	15	John Hunter Nemechek	124 (–61)
5	16	Kyle Busch	122 (–63)
Official driver's standings

Manufacturers' Championship standings

Pos	Manufacturer	Points
1	Chevrolet	184
2	Toyota	181 (–3)
3	Ford	166 (–18)

- Note: Only the first 16 positions are included for the driver standings.

== Notes ==
Previous race: 2024 Shriners Children's 500	NASCAR Cup Series; 2024 season	Next race: 2024 EchoPark Automotive Grand Prix
