= 2024 Toyota Owners 400 =

NASCAR Cup Series race

Race details
- Race 7 of 36 in the 2024 NASCAR Cup Series
- Date: March 31, 2024
- Location: Richmond Raceway in Richmond, Virginia
- Course: Permanent racing facility
- Course length: 0.75 miles (1.2 km)
- Distance: 407 laps, 305.25 mi (488.4 km)
- Scheduled distance: 400 laps, 300 mi (480 km)
- Average speed: 94.076 miles per hour (151.401 km/h)

Pole position
Driver	Kyle Larson	Hendrick Motorsports
- Time: 22.438

Most laps led
Driver	Martin Truex Jr.	Joe Gibbs Racing
- Laps: 228

Winner
No. 11	Denny Hamlin	Joe Gibbs Racing

Television in the United States
- Network: Fox
- Announcers: Mike Joy, Clint Bowyer, and Kevin Harvick

Radio in the United States
- Radio: MRN
- Booth announcers: Alex Hayden and Jeff Striegle
- Turn announcers: Mike Bagley (Backstretch)

The 2024 Toyota Owners 400 was a NASCAR Cup Series race held on March 31, 2024, at Richmond Raceway in Richmond, Virginia. Contested over 407 laps—extended from 400 laps due to an overtime finish, on the 0.75 mile (1.2 km) asphalt short track, it was the seventh race of the 2024 NASCAR Cup Series season. Denny Hamlin won the race. Joey Logano finished 2nd, and Kyle Larson finished 3rd. Martin Truex Jr. and Chase Elliott rounded out the top five, and Christopher Bell, William Byron, Brad Keselowski, Chris Buescher, and Tyler Reddick rounded out the top ten.

This was the final running of the Richmond spring race, as it was replaced by a race at Autódromo Hermanos Rodríguez in 2025.

== Report ==
=== Background ===
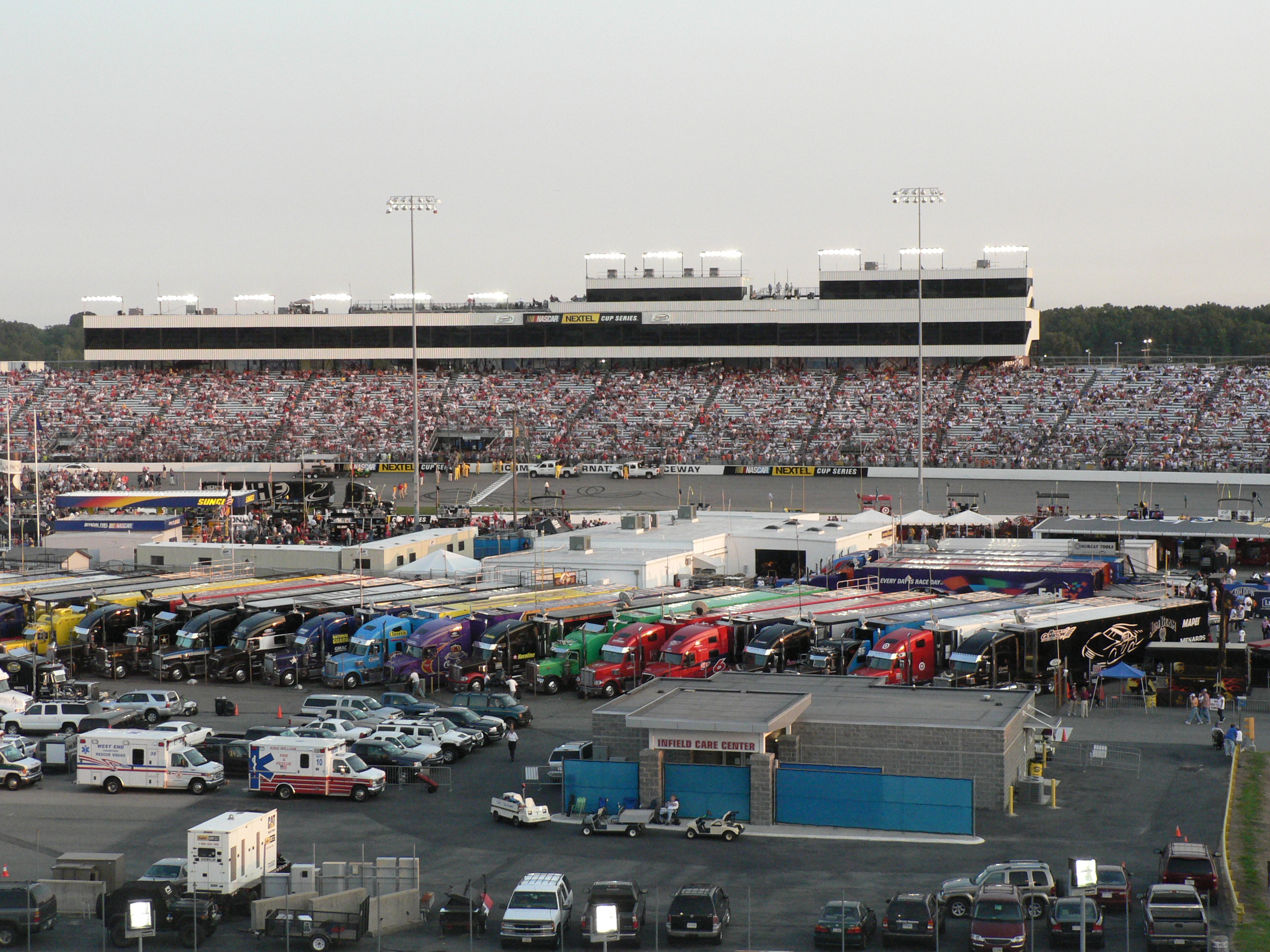
Richmond Raceway, the track where the race was held.

Richmond Raceway (RR) is a 0.75 miles (1.21 km), D-shaped, asphalt race track located just outside Richmond, Virginia in unincorporated Henrico County. It hosts the NASCAR Cup Series, NASCAR Xfinity Series and the NASCAR Craftsman Truck Series. Known as "America's premier short track", it has formerly hosted events such as the International Race of Champions, Denny Hamlin Short Track Showdown, and the USAC sprint car series. Due to Richmond Raceway's unique "D" shape which allows drivers to reach high speeds, Richmond has long been known as a short track that races like a superspeedway. With its multiple racing grooves, and proclivity for contact Richmond is a favorite among NASCAR drivers and fans.

==== Entry list ====
- (R) denotes rookie driver.
- (i) denotes driver who is ineligible for series driver points.

No.	Driver	Team	Manufacturer
1	Ross Chastain	Trackhouse Racing	Chevrolet
2	Austin Cindric	Team Penske	Ford
3	Austin Dillon	Richard Childress Racing	Chevrolet
4	Josh Berry (R)	Stewart–Haas Racing	Ford
5	Kyle Larson	Hendrick Motorsports	Chevrolet
6	Brad Keselowski	RFK Racing	Ford
7	Corey LaJoie	Spire Motorsports	Chevrolet
8	Kyle Busch	Richard Childress Racing	Chevrolet
9	Chase Elliott	Hendrick Motorsports	Chevrolet
10	Noah Gragson	Stewart–Haas Racing	Ford
11	Denny Hamlin	Joe Gibbs Racing	Toyota
12	Ryan Blaney	Team Penske	Ford
14	Chase Briscoe	Stewart–Haas Racing	Ford
15	Kaz Grala (R)	Rick Ware Racing	Ford
16	Ty Dillon (i)	Kaulig Racing	Chevrolet
17	Chris Buescher	RFK Racing	Ford
19	Martin Truex Jr.	Joe Gibbs Racing	Toyota
20	Christopher Bell	Joe Gibbs Racing	Toyota
21	Harrison Burton	Wood Brothers Racing	Ford
22	Joey Logano	Team Penske	Ford
23	Bubba Wallace	23XI Racing	Toyota
24	William Byron	Hendrick Motorsports	Chevrolet
31	Daniel Hemric	Kaulig Racing	Chevrolet
34	Michael McDowell	Front Row Motorsports	Ford
38	Todd Gilliland	Front Row Motorsports	Ford
41	Ryan Preece	Stewart–Haas Racing	Ford
42	John Hunter Nemechek	Legacy Motor Club	Toyota
43	Erik Jones	Legacy Motor Club	Toyota
45	Tyler Reddick	23XI Racing	Toyota
47	Ricky Stenhouse Jr.	JTG Daugherty Racing	Chevrolet
48	Alex Bowman	Hendrick Motorsports	Chevrolet
51	Justin Haley	Rick Ware Racing	Ford
54	Ty Gibbs	Joe Gibbs Racing	Toyota
71	Zane Smith (R)	Spire Motorsports	Chevrolet
77	Carson Hocevar (R)	Spire Motorsports	Chevrolet
99	Daniel Suárez	Trackhouse Racing	Chevrolet
Official entry list

== Practice ==
Kyle Larson was the fastest in the practice session with a time of 22.161 seconds and a speed of 121.836 mph (196.076 km/h).

=== Practice results ===
Pos	No.	Driver	Team	Manufacturer	Time	Speed
1	5	Kyle Larson	Hendrick Motorsports	Chevrolet	22.161	121.836
2	22	Joey Logano	Team Penske	Ford	22.224	121.490
3	17	Chris Buescher	RFK Racing	Ford	22.229	121.463
Official practice results

== Qualifying ==
Kyle Larson scored the pole for the race with a time of 22.438 and a speed of 120.332 mph (193.656 km/h).

=== Qualifying results ===
Pos	No.	Driver	Team	Manufacturer	R1	R2
1	5	Kyle Larson	Hendrick Motorsports	Chevrolet	22.358	22.438
2	9	Chase Elliott	Hendrick Motorsports	Chevrolet	22.114	22.440
3	1	Ross Chastain	Trackhouse Racing	Chevrolet	22.407	22.489
4	48	Alex Bowman	Hendrick Motorsports	Chevrolet	22.422	22.526
5	23	Bubba Wallace	23XI Racing	Toyota	22.178	22.534
6	38	Todd Gilliland	Front Row Motorsports	Ford	22.202	22.545
7	19	Martin Truex Jr.	Joe Gibbs Racing	Toyota	22.228	22.578
8	54	Ty Gibbs	Joe Gibbs Racing	Toyota	22.353	22.591
9	2	Austin Cindric	Team Penske	Ford	22.185	22.668
10	22	Joey Logano	Team Penske	Ford	22.333	22.676
11	11	Denny Hamlin	Joe Gibbs Racing	Toyota	22.230	—
12	12	Ryan Blaney	Team Penske	Ford	22.448	—
13	24	William Byron	Hendrick Motorsports	Chevrolet	22.231	—
14	17	Chris Buescher	RFK Racing	Ford	22.460	—
15	8	Kyle Busch	Richard Childress Racing	Chevrolet	22.255	—
16	41	Ryan Preece	Stewart-Haas Racing	Ford	22.477	—
17	10	Noah Gragson	Stewart-Haas Racing	Ford	22.255	—
18	42	John Hunter Nemechek	Legacy Motor Club	Toyota	22.487	—
19	45	Tyler Reddick	23XI Racing	Toyota	22.286	—
20	99	Daniel Suárez	Trackhouse Racing	Chevrolet	22.518	—
21	7	Corey LaJoie	Spire Motorsports	Chevrolet	22.333	—
22	3	Austin Dillon	Richard Childress Racing	Chevrolet	22.526	—
23	6	Brad Keselowski	RFK Racing	Ford	22.335	—
24	47	Ricky Stenhouse Jr.	JTG Daugherty Racing	Chevrolet	22.536	—
25	77	Carson Hocevar (R)	Spire Motorsports	Chevrolet	22.367	—
26	21	Harrison Burton	Wood Brothers Racing	Ford	22.553	—
27	43	Erik Jones	Legacy Motor Club	Toyota	22.375	—
28	71	Zane Smith (R)	Spire Motorsports	Chevrolet	22.564	—
29	20	Christopher Bell	Joe Gibbs Racing	Toyota	22.383	—
30	4	Josh Berry (R)	Stewart-Haas Racing	Ford	22.574	—
31	34	Michael McDowell	Front Row Motorsports	Ford	22.460	—
32	14	Chase Briscoe	Stewart-Haas Racing	Ford	22.613	—
33	16	Ty Dillon (i)	Kaulig Racing	Chevrolet	22.495	—
34	31	Daniel Hemric	Kaulig Racing	Chevrolet	22.972	—
35	15	Kaz Grala (R)	Rick Ware Racing	Ford	22.776	—
36	51	Justin Haley	Rick Ware Racing	Ford	23.007	—
Official qualifying results

== Race ==
=== Race results ===
==== Stage Results ====
Stage One Laps: 70

Pos	No	Driver	Team	Manufacturer	Points
1	5	Kyle Larson	Hendrick Motorsports	Chevrolet	10
2	23	Bubba Wallace	23XI Racing	Toyota	9
3	48	Alex Bowman	Hendrick Motorsports	Chevrolet	8
4	19	Martin Truex Jr.	Joe Gibbs Racing	Toyota	7
5	22	Joey Logano	Team Penske	Ford	6
6	38	Todd Gilliland	Front Row Motorsports	Ford	5
7	9	Chase Elliott	Hendrick Motorsports	Chevrolet	4
8	1	Ross Chastain	Trackhouse Racing	Chevrolet	3
9	4	Josh Berry (R)	Stewart-Haas Racing	Ford	2
10	41	Ryan Preece	Stewart-Haas Racing	Ford	1
Official stage one results

Stage Two Laps: 160

Pos	No	Driver	Team	Manufacturer	Points
1	19	Martin Truex Jr.	Joe Gibbs Racing	Toyota	10
2	4	Josh Berry (R)	Stewart-Haas Racing	Ford	9
3	22	Joey Logano	Team Penske	Ford	8
4	5	Kyle Larson	Hendrick Motorsports	Chevrolet	7
5	11	Denny Hamlin	Joe Gibbs Racing	Toyota	6
6	20	Christopher Bell	Joe Gibbs Racing	Toyota	5
7	17	Chris Buescher	RFK Racing	Ford	4
8	23	Bubba Wallace	23XI Racing	Toyota	3
9	24	William Byron	Hendrick Motorsports	Chevrolet	2
10	45	Tyler Reddick	23XI Racing	Toyota	1
Official stage two results

=== Final Stage Results ===
Stage Three Laps: 170

Pos	Grid	No	Driver	Team	Manufacturer	Laps	Points
1	11	11	Denny Hamlin	Joe Gibbs Racing	Toyota	407	46
2	10	22	Joey Logano	Team Penske	Ford	407	49
3	1	5	Kyle Larson	Hendrick Motorsports	Chevrolet	407	51
4	7	19	Martin Truex Jr.	Joe Gibbs Racing	Toyota	407	50
5	2	9	Chase Elliott	Hendrick Motorsports	Chevrolet	407	36
6	29	20	Christopher Bell	Joe Gibbs Racing	Toyota	407	36
7	13	24	William Byron	Hendrick Motorsports	Chevrolet	407	32
8	23	6	Brad Keselowski	RFK Racing	Ford	407	29
9	14	17	Chris Buescher	RFK Racing	Ford	407	32
10	19	45	Tyler Reddick	23XI Racing	Toyota	407	28
11	30	4	Josh Berry (R)	Stewart-Haas Racing	Ford	407	37
12	17	10	Noah Gragson	Stewart-Haas Racing	Ford	407	25
13	5	23	Bubba Wallace	23XI Racing	Toyota	407	36
14	27	43	Erik Jones	Legacy Motor Club	Toyota	407	23
15	3	1	Ross Chastain	Trackhouse Racing	Chevrolet	407	25
16	8	54	Ty Gibbs	Joe Gibbs Racing	Toyota	407	21
17	4	48	Alex Bowman	Hendrick Motorsports	Chevrolet	407	28
18	32	14	Chase Briscoe	Stewart-Haas Racing	Ford	407	19
19	12	12	Ryan Blaney	Team Penske	Ford	407	18
20	15	8	Kyle Busch	Richard Childress Racing	Chevrolet	407	17
21	6	38	Todd Gilliland	Front Row Motorsports	Ford	407	21
22	20	99	Daniel Suárez	Trackhouse Racing	Chevrolet	407	15
23	9	2	Austin Cindric	Team Penske	Ford	406	14
24	22	3	Austin Dillon	Richard Childress Racing	Chevrolet	406	13
25	18	42	John Hunter Nemechek	Legacy Motor Club	Toyota	406	12
26	31	34	Michael McDowell	Front Row Motorsports	Ford	406	11
27	25	77	Carson Hocevar (R)	Spire Motorsports	Chevrolet	406	10
28	16	41	Ryan Preece	Stewart-Haas Racing	Ford	406	10
29	33	16	Ty Dillon (i)	Kaulig Racing	Chevrolet	406	0
30	34	31	Daniel Hemric	Kaulig Racing	Chevrolet	405	7
31	35	15	Kaz Grala (R)	Rick Ware Racing	Ford	405	6
32	36	51	Justin Haley	Rick Ware Racing	Ford	405	5
33	24	47	Ricky Stenhouse Jr.	JTG Daugherty Racing	Chevrolet	405	4
34	26	21	Harrison Burton	Wood Brothers Racing	Ford	405	3
35	28	71	Zane Smith (R)	Spire Motorsports	Chevrolet	404	2
36	21	7	Corey LaJoie	Spire Motorsports	Chevrolet	404	1
Official race results

=== Race statistics ===
- Lead changes: 16 among 7 different drivers
- Cautions/Laps: 5 for 54 laps
- Red flags: 1 for 2 minutes and 16 seconds
- Time of race: 3 hours, 14 minutes and 41 seconds
- Average speed: 94.076 miles per hour (151.401 km/h)

== Media ==
=== Television ===
Fox Sports covered the race on the television side. Mike Joy, two-time Richmond winner Clint Bowyer, and four-time Richmond winner Kevin Harvick called the race from the broadcast booth. Jamie Little and Regan Smith handled pit road for the television side, and Larry McReynolds provided insight from the Fox Sports studio in Charlotte.

Fox
Booth announcers	Pit reporters	In-race analyst
Lap-by-lap: Mike Joy; Color-commentator: Clint Bowyer; Color-commentator: Kevin Harvick	Jamie Little; Regan Smith	Larry McReynolds

=== Radio ===
MRN had the radio call for the race which was also simulcasted on Sirius XM NASCAR Radio. Alex Hayden & Jeff Striegle called the race in the booth when the field raced down the frontstretch. Mike Bagley called the race from a platform inside the backstretch when the field raced down the backstretch. Steve Post, Jason Toy, and Chris Wilner handled pit road for the radio side.

MRN
Booth announcers	Turn announcers	Pit reporters
Lead announcer: Alex Hayden; Announcer: Jeff Striegle	Backstretch: Mike Bagley	Steve Post; Jason Toy; Chris Wilner

== Standings after the race ==
Drivers' Championship standings

	Pos	Driver	Points
	1	Martin Truex Jr.	270
3	2	Kyle Larson	256 (–14)
1	3	Denny Hamlin	252 (–18)
2	4	Ty Gibbs	236 (–34)
2	5	Ryan Blaney	229 (–41)
1	6	Christopher Bell	219 (–51)
1	7	William Byron	215 (–55)
1	8	Chase Elliott	209 (–61)
1	9	Ross Chastain	207 (–63)
	10	Tyler Reddick	199 (–71)
	11	Alex Bowman	193 (–77)
	12	Chris Buescher	185 (–85)
	13	Kyle Busch	167 (–103)
4	14	Bubba Wallace	165 (–105)
1	15	Daniel Suárez	163 (–107)
	16	Brad Keselowski	163 (–107)
Official driver's standings

Manufacturers' Championship standings

Pos	Manufacturer	Points
1	Chevrolet	258
2	Toyota	256 (–2)
3	Ford	230 (–28)

- Note: Only the first 16 positions are included for the driver standings.

Previous race: 2024 EchoPark Automotive Grand Prix	NASCAR Cup Series; 2024 season	Next race: 2024 Cook Out 400
