= Kaz Grala =

American racing driver (born 1998)

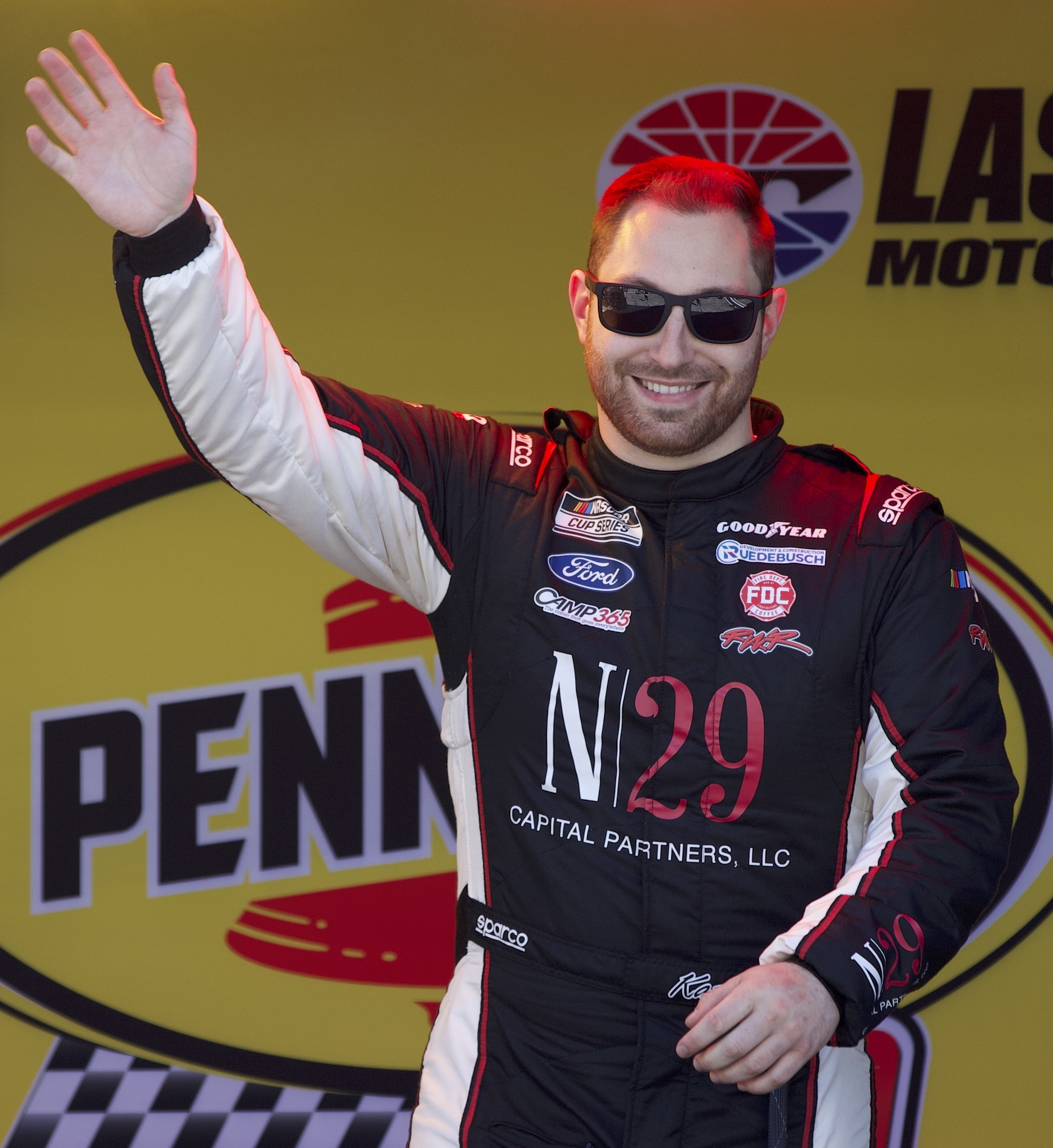
- Grala at Las Vegas Motor Speedway in 2024
- Born: Kaz Edward Grala; December 29, 1998 (age 27); Boston, Massachusetts, U.S.
- Achievements: Youngest driver to make the NASCAR playoffs (18); Youngest NASCAR race winner at Daytona International Speedway (18); Youngest NASCAR pole winner at Daytona International Speedway (18); Youngest driver to compete in an IMSA race (15); Youngest race winner in UARA-Stars (14)

NASCAR Cup Series career
- 31 races run over 4 years
- 2024 position: 35th
- Best finish: 35th (2024)
- First race: 2020 Go Bowling 235 (Daytona RC)
- Last race: 2024 NASCAR Cup Series Championship Race (Phoenix)
Wins	Top tens	Poles
0	2	0

NASCAR O'Reilly Auto Parts Series career
- 81 races run over 7 years
- 2025 position: 83rd
- Best finish: 17th (2023)
- First race: 2018 PowerShares QQQ 300 (Daytona)
- Last race: 2025 Blue Cross NC 250 (Charlotte Roval)
Wins	Top tens	Poles
0	20	0

NASCAR FedEx Freight Truck Series career
- 52 races run over 7 years
- 2026 position: 54th
- Best finish: 7th (2017)
- First race: 2016 Alpha Energy Solutions 250 (Martinsville)
- Last race: 2026 Navy 250 (San Diego)
- First win: 2017 NextEra Energy Resources 250 (Daytona)
Wins	Top tens	Poles
1	20	1

NASCAR Canada Series career
- 2 races run over 1 year
- 2016 position: 41st
- Best finish: 41st (2016)
- First race: 2016 Clarington 200 (Mosport)
- Last race: 2016 Can-Am 200 (Mosport)
Wins	Top tens	Poles
0	0	0

ARCA Menards Series career
- 2 races run over 1 year
- Best finish: 48th (2017)
- First race: 2017 Lucas Oil 200 (Daytona)
- Last race: 2017 ModSpace 150 (Pocono)
Wins	Top tens	Poles
0	2	1

ARCA Menards Series East career
- 38 races run over 3 years
- Best finish: 7th (2014, 2015)
- First race: 2014 New Smyrna 150 presented by JEGS (New Smyrna)
- Last race: 2016 Bully Hill Vineyards 125 (Watkins Glen)
Wins	Top tens	Poles
0	24	0

ARCA Menards Series West career
- 2 races run over 1 year
- Best finish: 41st (2015)
- First race: 2015 Carneros 200 (Sonoma)
- Last race: 2015 Casino Arizona 100 (Phoenix)
Wins	Top tens	Poles
0	0	0
- Statistics up to date as of November 6, 2026.

Kaz Edward Grala (/ˈɡrɔːlə/ GRAW-lə; born December 29, 1998) is an American-Polish professional stock car racing driver. He last competed part-time in the NASCAR Craftsman Truck Series, driving the No. 62 Toyota Tundra for Halmar Friesen Racing. Grala also serves as the simulation/reserve driver for Legacy Motor Club. He has previously competed in the NASCAR Cup Series, NASCAR Xfinity Series, and NASCAR Pinty's Series, as well as what is now the ARCA Menards Series, ARCA Menards Series East and ARCA Menards Series West.

Grala is the youngest NASCAR winner in the history of Daytona International Speedway with his win in the 2017 Truck Series season-opener at the age of eighteen and the youngest person to ever compete in an International Motor Sports Association (IMSA) event at the age of fifteen.

== Racing career ==
=== Early career ===
Grala, a native of Boston, started racing go-karts at F1 Boston in Braintree, Massachusetts, when he was four years old. When he was ten, he began racing Bandoleros, winning the Summer Shootout Championship in 2011. That same year, he won the New York Legendstock and the Massachusetts Bandolero Outlaws state championships. In 2012, Grala won 15 races and the Winter Heat Championship at Charlotte in the Legend Car Pro Division.

In 2013, Grala made his late model debut in UARA-STARS, becoming the youngest winner in series history at Hickory Motor Speedway, followed by setting the record as the youngest driver to lead laps in the Myrtle Beach 400 where he finished second to Lee Pulliam. That same year, he was named by Speed 51 as the 2013 JEGS Rookie of the Year.

=== NASCAR ===
==== 2014–2016 ====
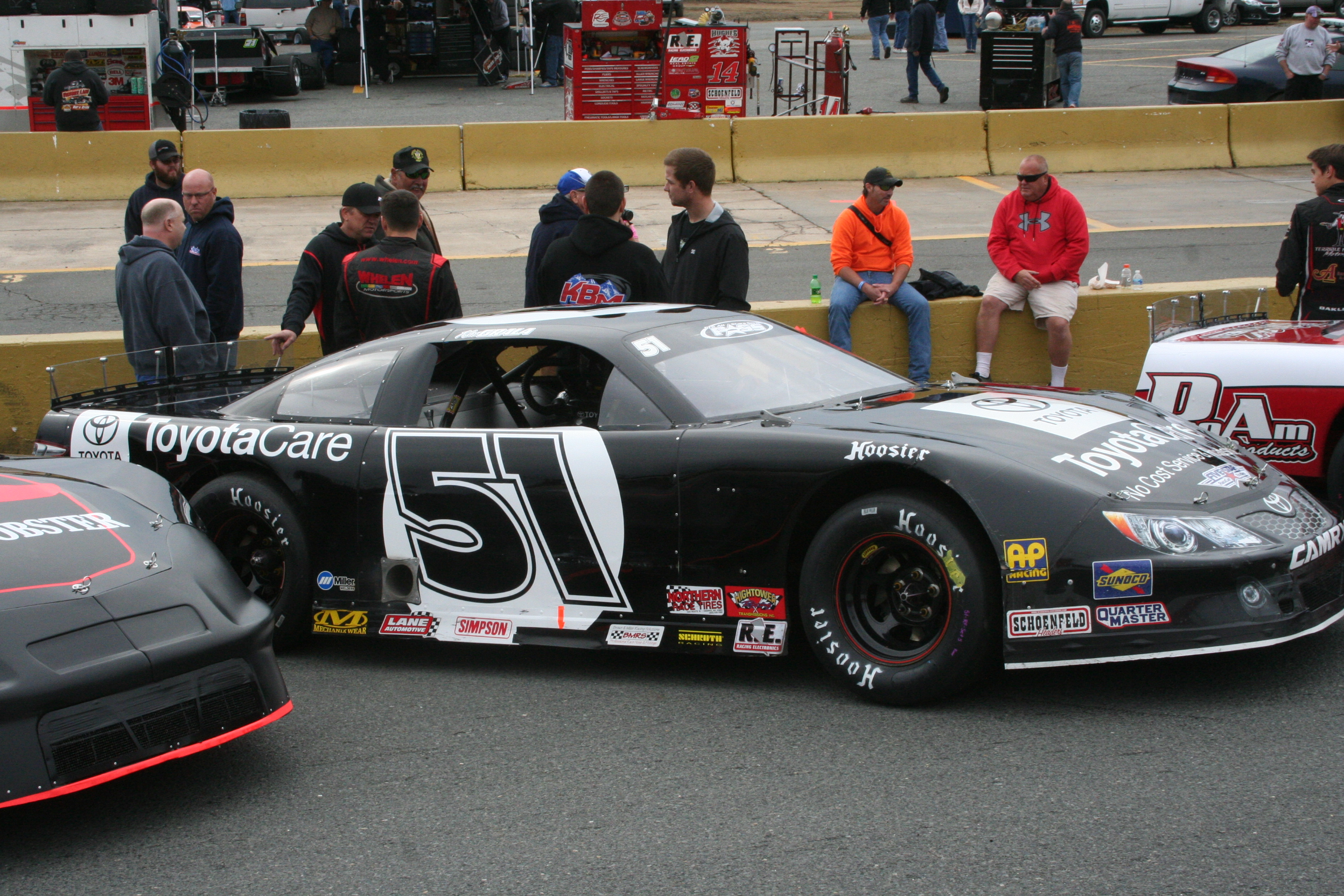
Grala's No. 51 late model for Kyle Busch Motorsports in 2014

In 2014, Grala competed in the NASCAR Whelen All-American Series and won at Caraway Speedway and Martinsville Speedway and also joined Turner Scott Motorsports to compete full-time in the K&N Pro Series East. He was the youngest driver in the series that year.

In 2015, Grala joined Ben Kennedy Racing to race full-time in the K&N Pro Series East once again.

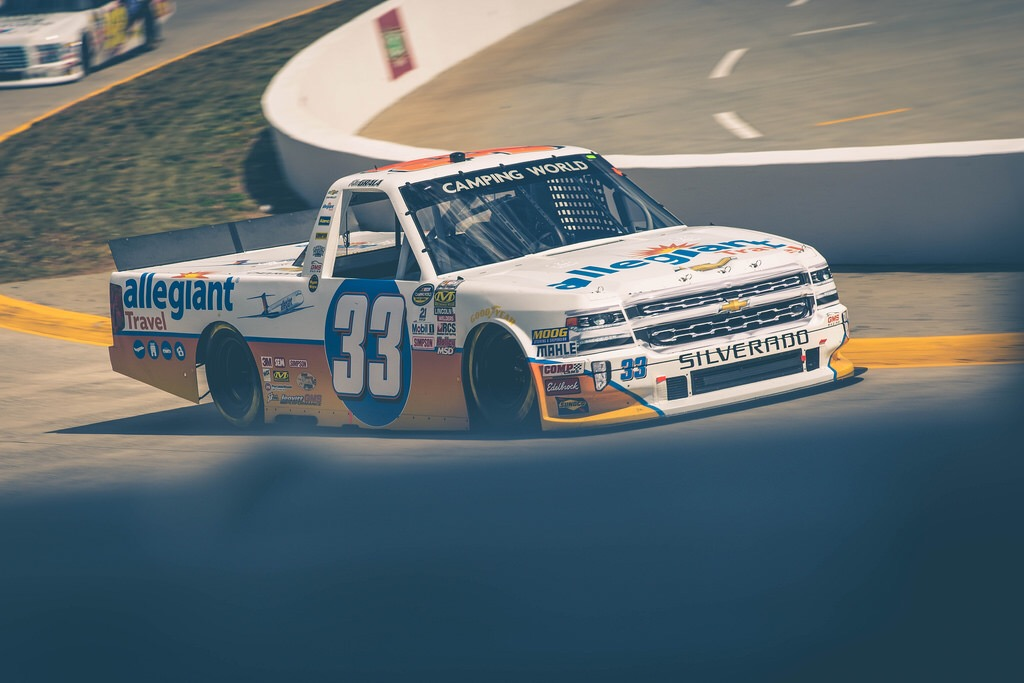
Grala's No. 33 truck for GMS Racing at Martinsville in 2016

In 2016, Grala made his NASCAR Gander Outdoors Truck Series debut at Martinsville for GMS Racing, driving the No. 33 Chevrolet. Grala would get his first career top-ten finish at Dover International Speedway in just his second start in the series. With Ben Kennedy joining the team, Grala moved over to the No. 24 truck to compete in seven more races that year.

==== 2017 ====
Grala ran the full Truck Series season in 2017 for GMS in their No. 33 Chevrolet. After avoiding all the crashes at Daytona International Speedway, he won his first race in the series after starting on the pole, making him both the youngest driver to win a NASCAR pole at Daytona and the youngest driver to win a NASCAR race at Daytona (eighteen years, one month and 26 days). It was Grala's first win in NASCAR and essentially locked him into a spot in the Playoffs for the Truck Series in 2017. Grala almost won at Canadian Tire Motorsport Park in September, after leading the closing laps and then in one of the final corners he was tapped and spun around by Austin Cindric. Grala was eliminated from the Playoffs before the Round of 6 due to an early crash in the cutoff race at Talladega Superspeedway, which ultimately resulted in him finishing the season seventh in the Truck Series standings.

==== 2018–2022 ====
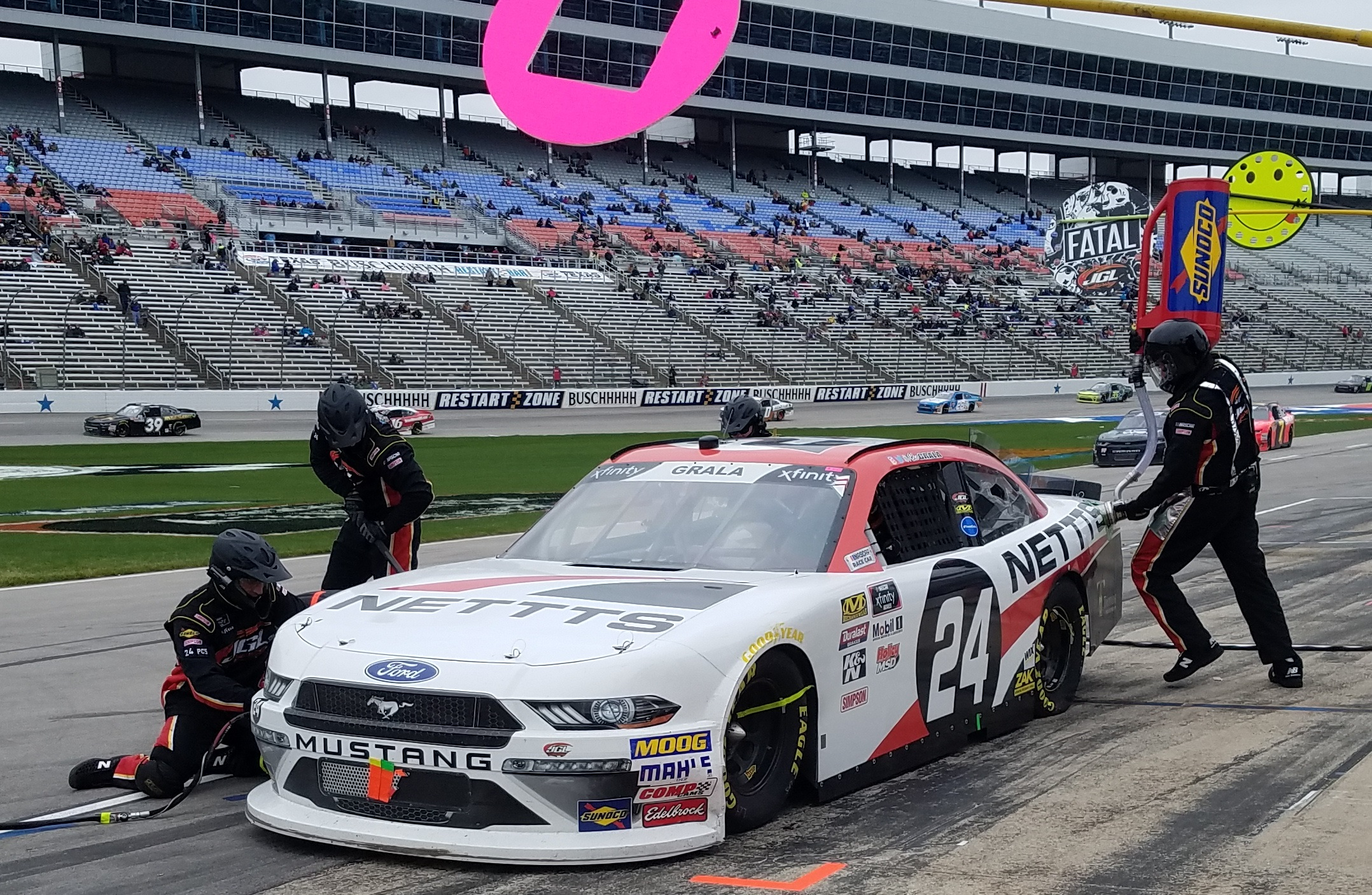
Grala making a pit stop in the Xfinity Series race at Texas in April 2018

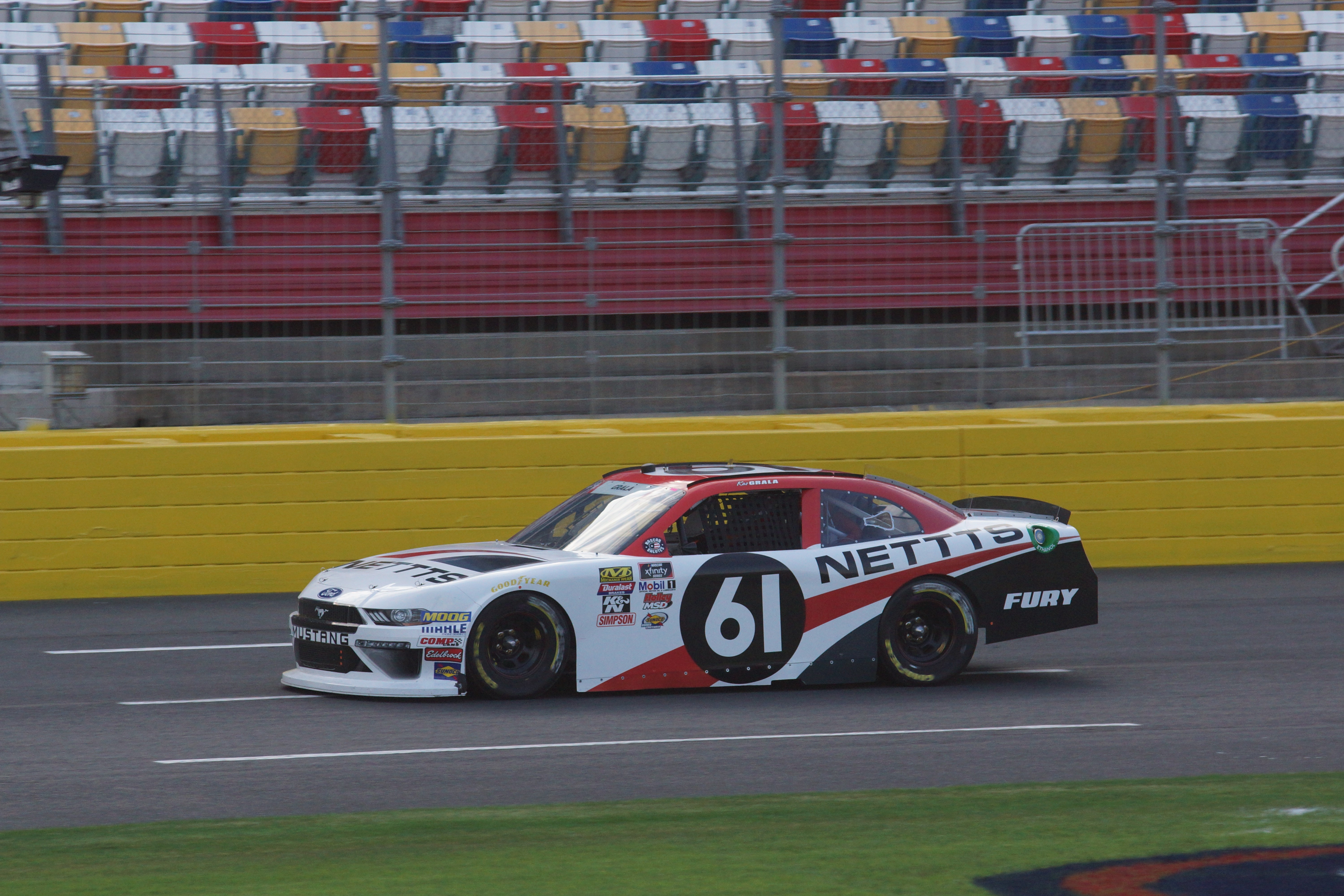
Grala in the No. 61 for FURY Race Cars at the Charlotte oval, the team's Xfinity Series debut.

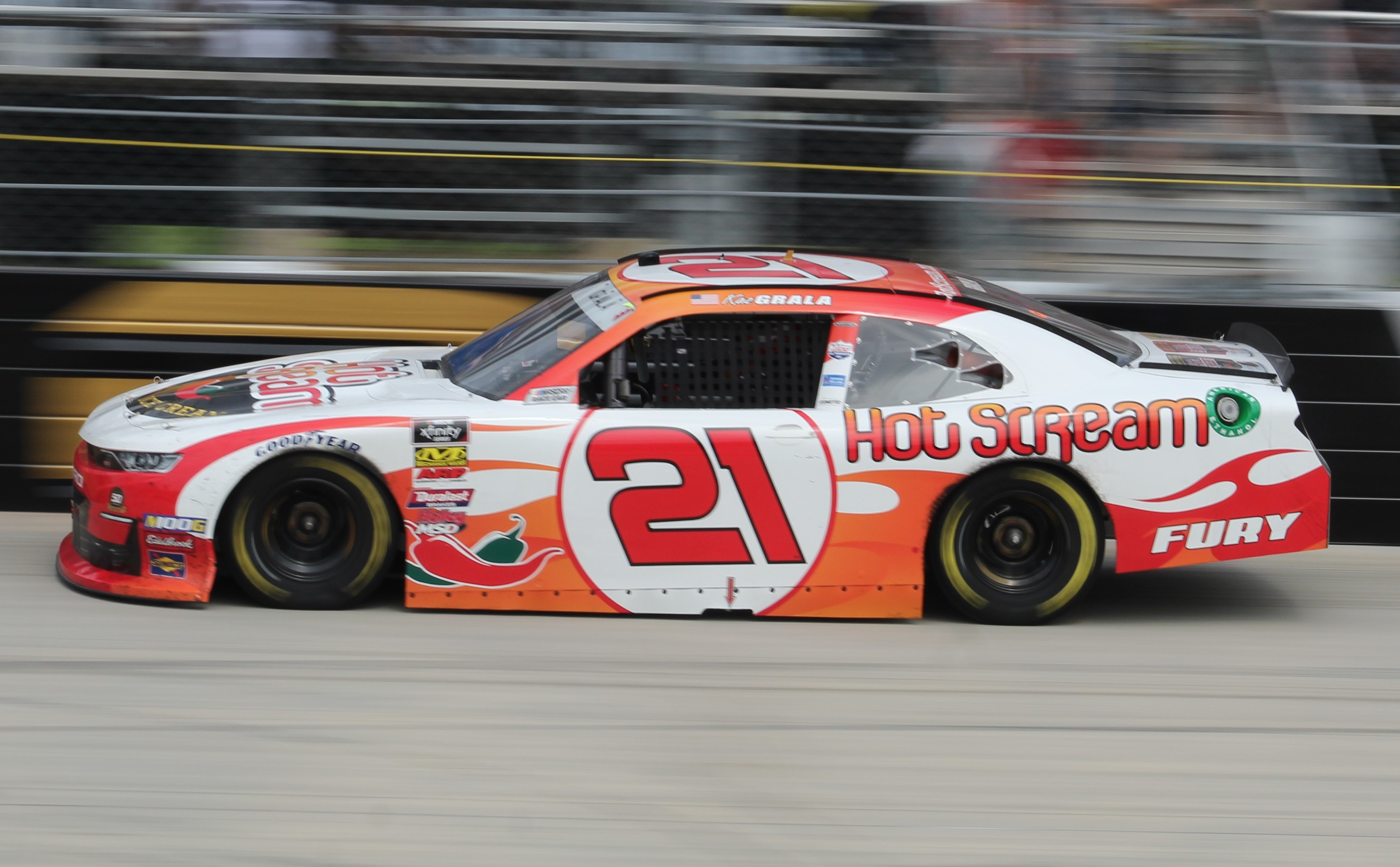
Grala in the No. 21 for Richard Childress Racing at Dover in May 2019

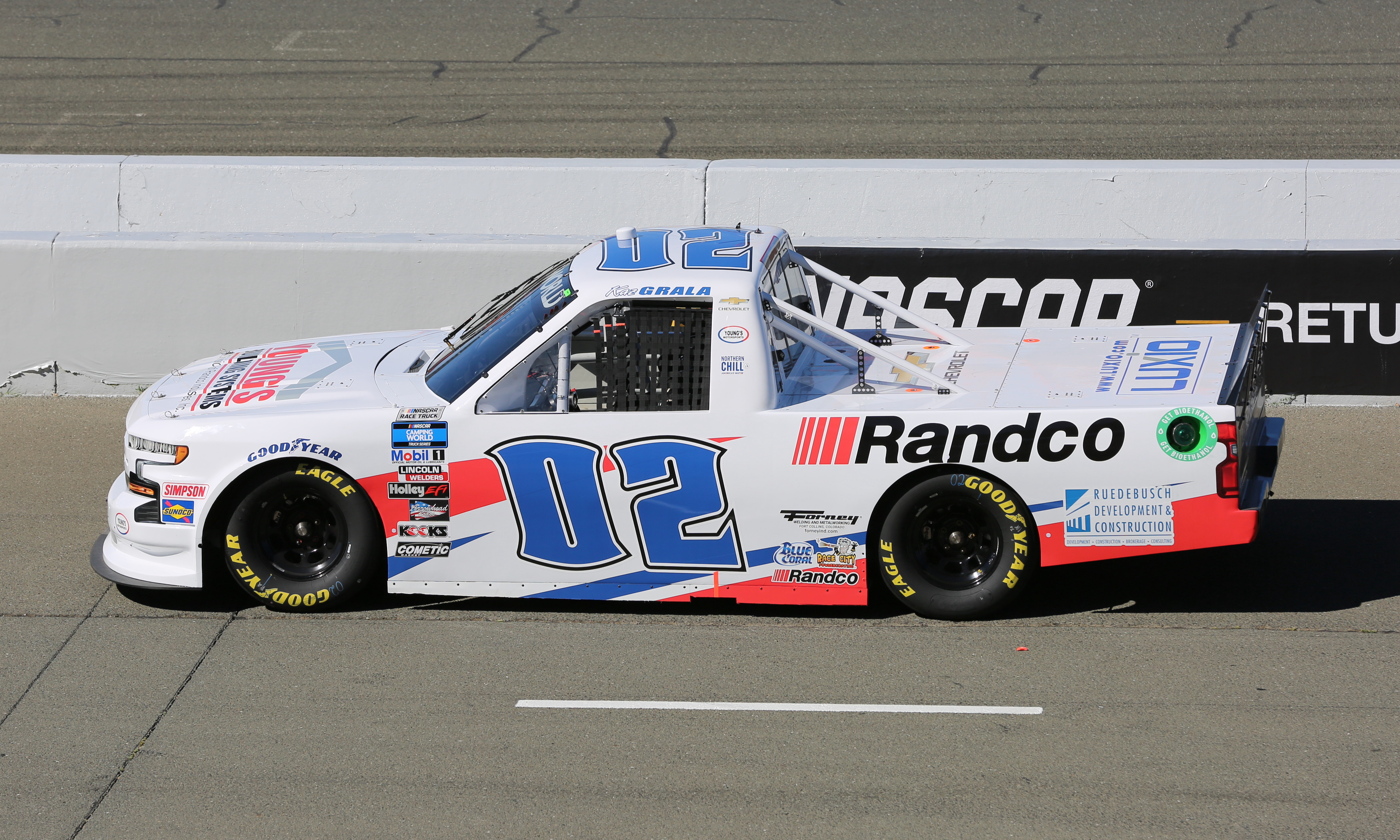
Grala's No. 02 truck at Sonoma Raceway in 2022

On November 15, 2017, it was announced that Grala would join JGL Racing full-time in the NASCAR Xfinity Series as a 2018 Sunoco Rookie of the Year contender, driving the No. 24 Ford. Grala finished fourth in his debut at Daytona. However, on May 15, the team shut down the No. 24 program, leaving Grala without a ride. Three days later, Grala announced he would run the next four Xfinity races for Fury Race Cars, driving the No. 61 Mustang beginning at Charlotte Motor Speedway. Grala drove to an impressive tenth-place finish in FURY's debut as a team. With sponsorship support from IT Coalition, DMB Financial, Kiklos, and HotScream, Grala was able to add another eight races to his schedule beyond the original four. Grala's best finish with the organization was a top-five at Daytona International Speedway, which he achieved in a ten year old borrowed car slated to be retired as a show car. In 2019, Grala joined Richard Childress Racing's No. 21 Xfinity car for a part-time schedule. He was originally going to run part-time with FURY with the amassed sponsorship, but Grala took the sponsorship to RCR to lower costs. He stayed with the team for the 2020 season.

Grala's 2020 schedule began in July at Kansas, where he finished thirteenth. He ran the next race at Road America and tied his career-best fourth-place finish. In 2020, Grala joined Niece Motorsports for a one-off race at Talladega as a replacement for Natalie Decker. In August 2020, a week after his Xfinity start at Road America, Grala was called by RCR to substitute for Austin Dillon in their No. 3 NASCAR Cup Series car at the Daytona road course after Dillon tested positive for COVID-19. The Go Bowling 235 would see Grala finish seventh in his Cup debut.

Grala joined Kaulig Racing in 2021 for a multi-race schedule that included the Daytona 500, driving the No. 16. At the 2021 Coke Zero Sugar 400 at Daytona, he suffered a foot injury from one of the race's accidents. Grala returned to the Truck Series again in 2021, driving for Young's Motorsports at the Daytona Road Course in their No. 02, replacing Kris Wright, the full-time driver of that truck. He joined Jordan Anderson Racing in 2021 for the Xfinity Series races at Road America and Texas Motor Speedway.

On January 24, 2022, Alpha Prime Racing announced that Grala would drive for them in four races and be the team's reserve driver. On April 12, Big Machine Racing announced that he would drive for them at Talladega and Dover. Grala became The Money Team Racing's first official driver in the team's debut at the 2022 Daytona 500. On lap forty of the race, he lost his right rear wheel and tire, but he finished the race in 26th place. On February 3, 2022, Young's Motorsports confirmed that Grala would return to the team to run eleven races in the team's No. 02 truck, sharing the ride with Jesse Little.

==== 2023–present ====
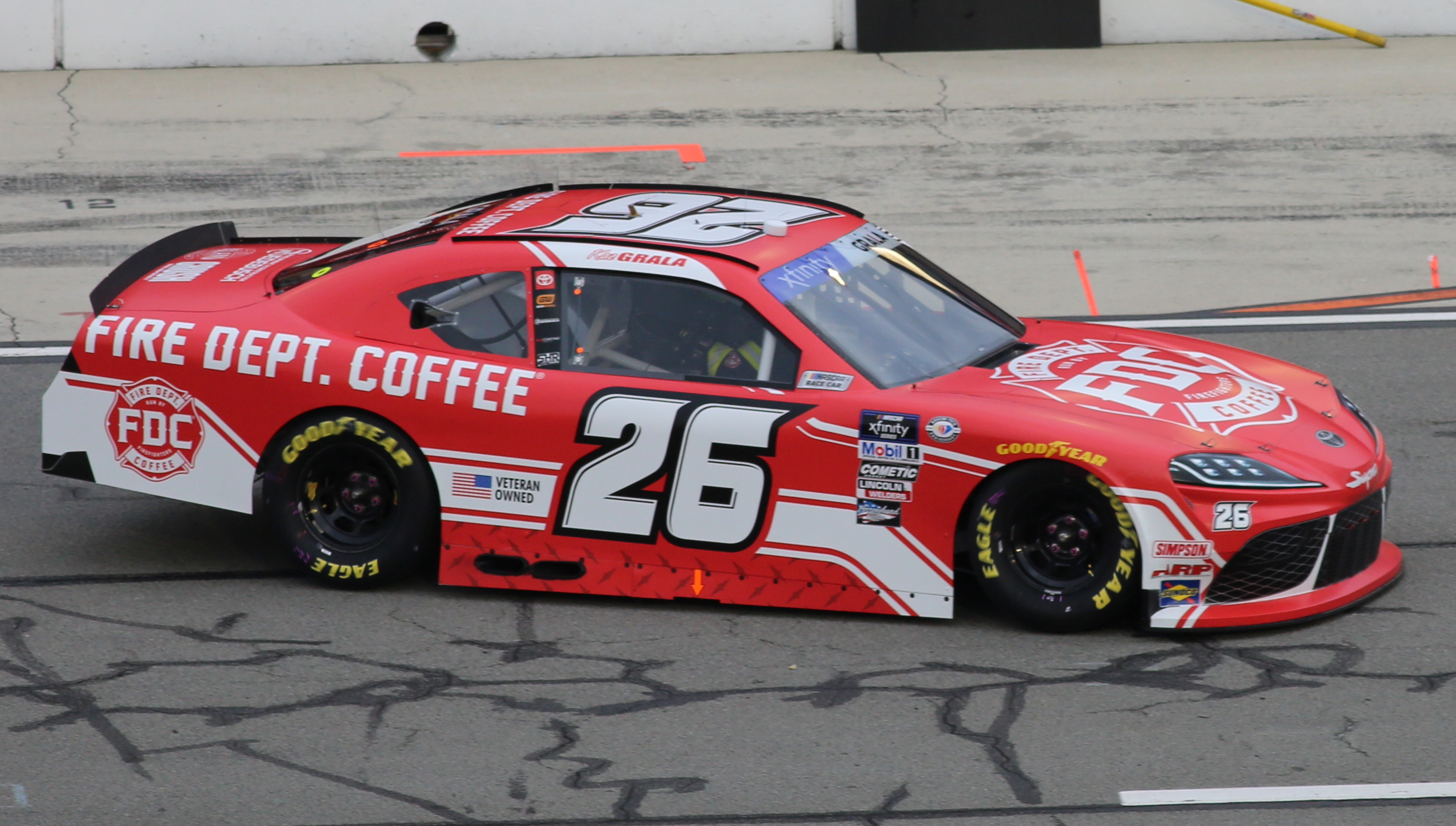
Grala at Auto Club Speedway in 2023

On December 8, 2022, Sam Hunt Racing announced that Grala would compete full-time for them in 2023, driving the No. 26 Toyota GR Supra, with sponsorship to be announced at a later date.

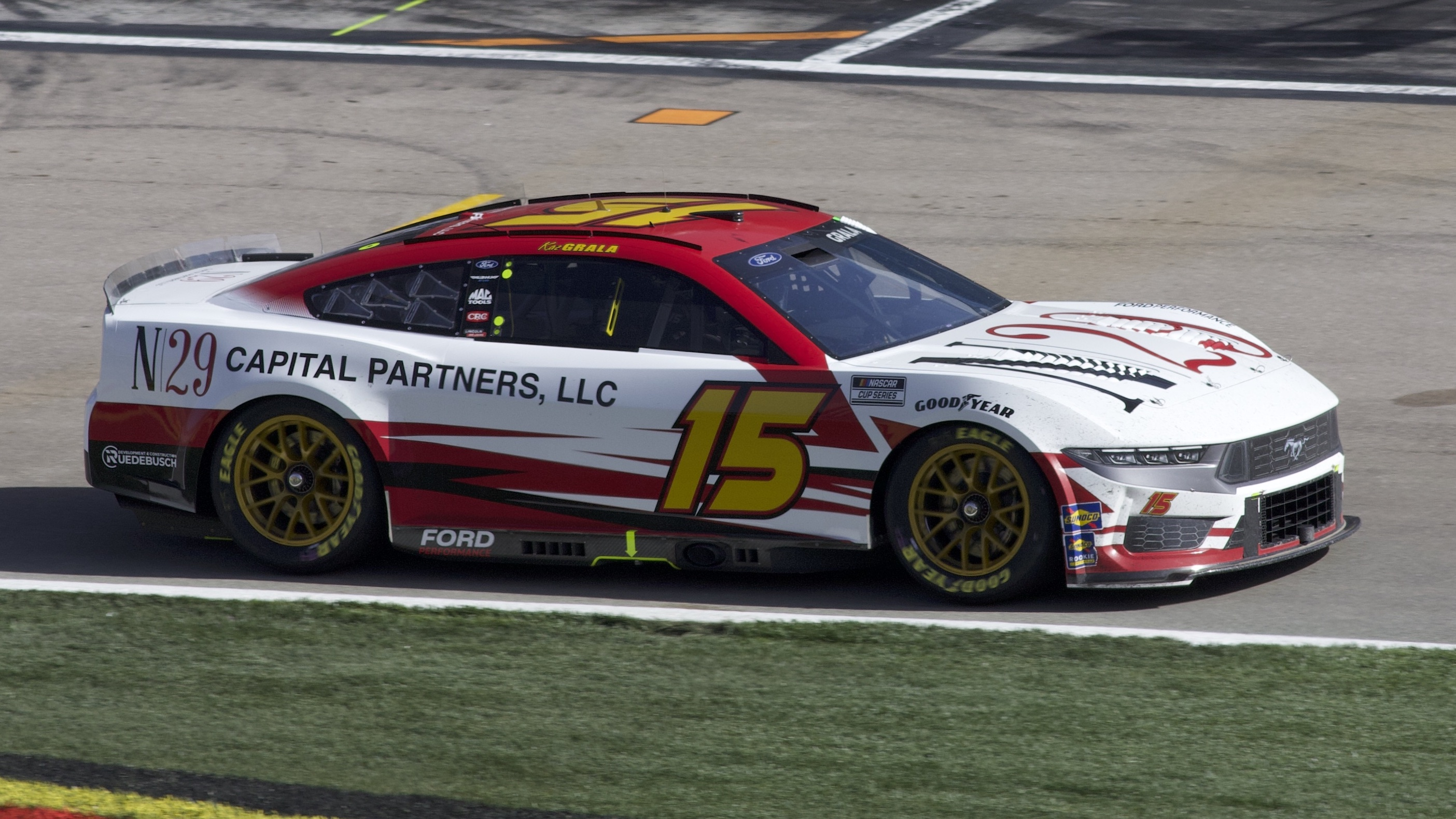
Grala's No. 15 car at Las Vegas Motor Speedway in 2024

On January 17, 2024, Rick Ware Racing announced that Grala will run 25 cup races for the team in 2024, driving the No. 15 Ford Mustang Dark Horse. A few days later, Front Row Motorsports announced that Grala would run the 2024 Daytona 500 in the No. 36 Ford Mustang. Grala finished twelfth in his Bluegreen Vacations Duel, qualifying him for the Daytona 500. He ended up crashing on lap five of the Daytona 500, finishing 38th. The very next week at Atlanta, he would make his first start for RWR. Despite spinning early in the race, he would finish a season best fourteenth place.

On February 15, 2025, it was announced that Grala would join Legacy Motor Club as the teams reserve and simulator driver. Grala also competed part-time for Sam Hunt Racing in 2025, driving the No. 24 Supra in three Xfinity Series races. Grala competed for Our Motorsports in their final race at Dover, replacing Kris Wright, who departed the team prior to the event.

=== Other racing ===
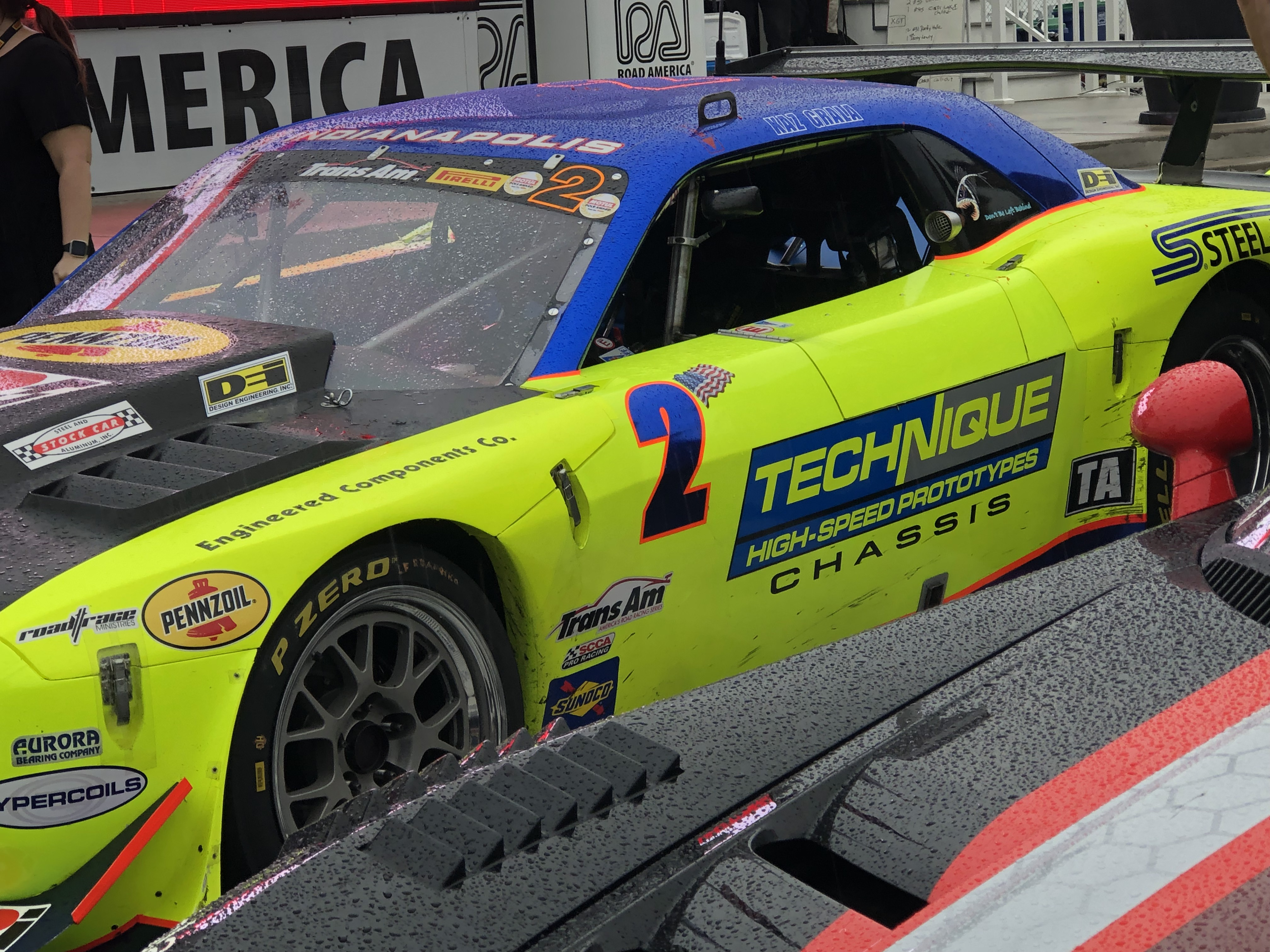
Grala's TA car in victory lane at Road America, July 2, 2022.

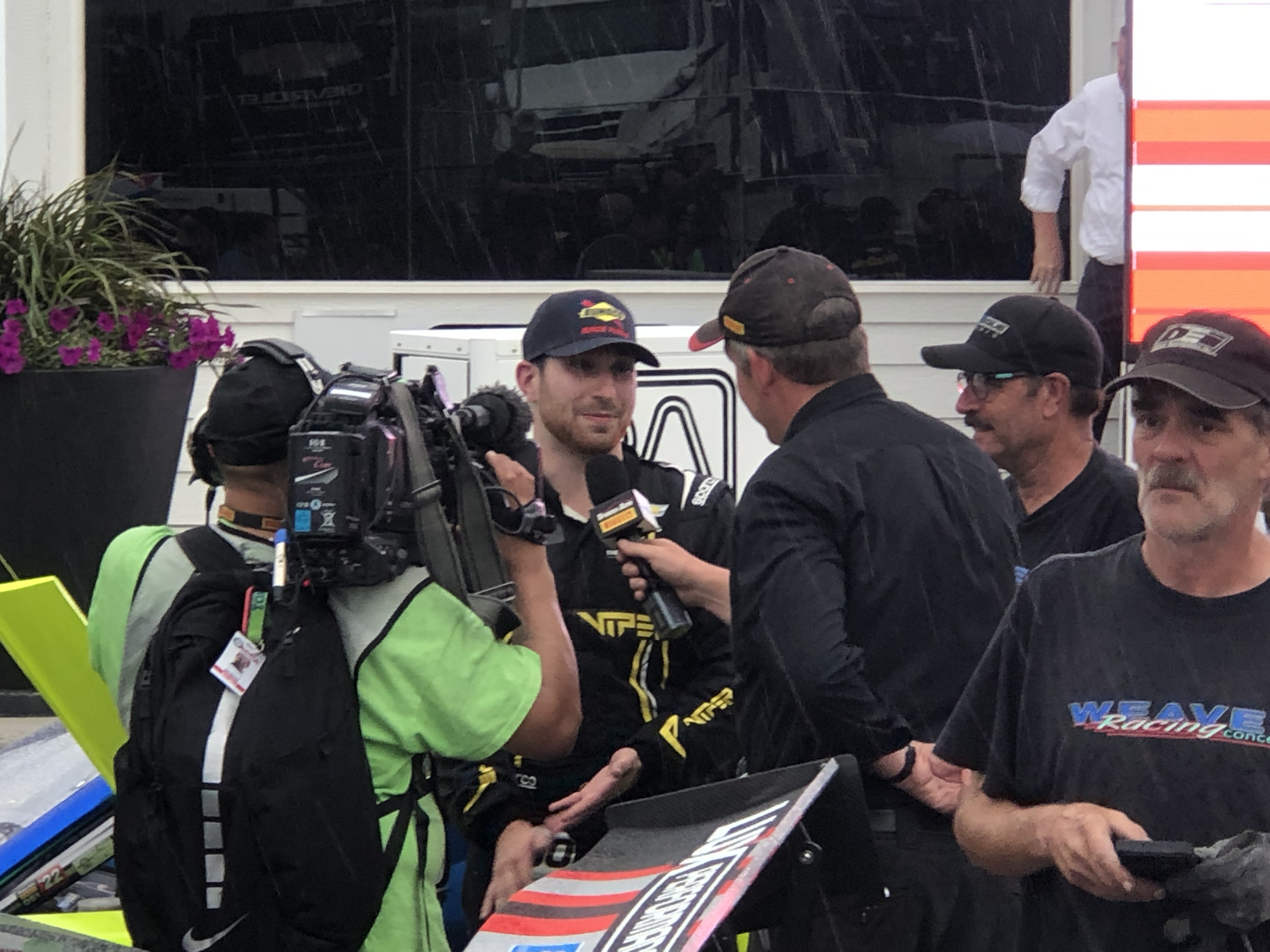
Grala being interviewed in victory lane at Road America on July 2, 2022.

In 2014, Grala ran in the Continental Tire SportsCar Challenge, where he became the youngest driver ever to compete in an International Motor Sports Association (IMSA) event at the age of fifteen years and one week old.

In 2016, Grala competed in his first Rolex 24 Hours of Daytona for Change Racing alongside former Rolex 24 winners Spencer Pumpelly and Justin Marks, in addition to race newcomer Corey Lewis; at the age of seventeen, Grala was the youngest driver in the field.

On July 2, 2022, Grala won the Trans-Am Series TA/GT race at Road America, driving the No. 2 Weaver Racing Dodge Challenger. This was only Grala's second start in the series and second consecutive pole and track record. In the previous race, at Mid-Ohio Sports Car Course, Grala was leading when his car suffered a mechanical failure.

== Personal life ==
Grala was born in Boston and grew up in the suburb of Westborough. Grala's father Darius is a former sports car racer, competing in the 24 Hours of Daytona three times. He is of Polish ancestry.

Grala attended high school at Worcester Academy, graduating in 2017. Grala has been accepted to Georgia Tech to major in engineering, but has deferred his admission to pursue his racing career.

Grala lives in Mooresville, North Carolina.

== Motorsports career results ==
=== NASCAR ===
(key) (Bold – Pole position awarded by qualifying time. Italics – Pole position earned by points standings or practice time. * – Most laps led.)

==== Cup Series ====
NASCAR Cup Series results
Year	Team	No.	Make	1	2	3	4	5	6	7	8	9	10	11	12	13	14	15	16	17	18	19	20	21	22	23	24	25	26	27	28	29	30	31	32	33	34	35	36	NCSC	Pts	Ref
2020	Richard Childress Racing	3	Chevy	DAY	LVS	CAL	PHO	DAR	DAR	CLT	CLT	BRI	ATL	MAR	HOM	TAL	POC	POC	IND	KEN	TEX	KAN	NHA	MCH	MCH	DRC; 7	DOV	DOV	DAY	DAR	RCH	BRI	LVS	TAL	ROV	KAN	TEX	MAR	PHO	40th	0^{1}	
2021	Kaulig Racing	16	Chevy	DAY; 28	DRC	HOM	LVS	PHO	ATL	BRD	MAR	RCH	TAL; 6	KAN	DAR	DOV	COA	CLT	SON	NSH	POC	POC	ROA	ATL	NHA	GLN	IRC	MCH	DAY; 35	DAR	RCH	BRI	LVS	TAL	ROV	TEX	KAN	MAR	PHO	45th	0^{2}	
2022	The Money Team Racing	50	Chevy	DAY; 26	CAL	LVS	PHO	ATL	COA; 25	RCH	MAR	BRD	TAL	DOV	DAR	KAN	CLT; 23	GTW	SON	NSH	ROA	ATL	NHA	POC	IRC	MCH	RCH	GLN	DAY	DAR	KAN	BRI	TEX	TAL	ROV	LVS	HOM	MAR	PHO	53rd	0^{1}	
2024	Front Row Motorsports	36	Ford	DAY; 38																																				35th	206	
2024	Rick Ware Racing	15	Ford		ATL; 14	LVS; 31	PHO; 30	BRI; 19	COA; 27	RCH; 31	MAR; 26	TEX; 27	TAL	DOV; 29	KAN	DAR; 18	CLT; 34	GTW	SON; 23	IOW; 33	NHA; 22	NSH	CSC; 26	POC	IND	RCH	MCH	DAY	DAR; 34	ATL	GLN; 35	BRI; 37	KAN; 31	TAL	ROV; 27	LVS	HOM; 32	MAR; 27	PHO; 34	35th	206	

===== Daytona 500 =====
Year	Team	Manufacturer	Start	Finish
2021	Kaulig Racing	Chevrolet	40	28
2022	The Money Team Racing	Chevrolet	35	26
2024	Front Row Motorsports	Ford	26	38

==== Xfinity Series ====
NASCAR Xfinity Series results
Year	Team	No.	Make	1	2	3	4	5	6	7	8	9	10	11	12	13	14	15	16	17	18	19	20	21	22	23	24	25	26	27	28	29	30	31	32	33	NXSC	Pts	Ref
2018	JGL Racing	24	Ford	DAY; 4	ATL; 23	LVS; 16	PHO; 12	CAL; 14	TEX; 26	BRI; 38	RCH; 30	TAL; 20	DOV; 37																								22nd	439	
2018	FURY Race Cars	61	Ford											CLT; 10	POC; 16	MCH; 12	IOW; 10	CHI; 40	DAY; 5	KEN	NHA; 14	IOW	GLN; 15	MOH; 27	BRI	ROA; 11	DAR	IND	LVS	RCH	ROV; 8	DOV	KAN	TEX	PHO	HOM; 18	22nd	439	
2019	Richard Childress Racing	21	Chevy	DAY	ATL	LVS	PHO	CAL	TEX; 18	BRI	RCH; 14	TAL	DOV; 14	CLT	POC	MCH	IOW	CHI	DAY	KEN	NHA; 14	IOW	GLN	MOH	BRI	ROA; 5	DAR	IND	LVS	RCH	ROV	DOV	KAN	TEX	PHO	HOM	37th	120	
2020	Richard Childress Racing	21	Chevy	DAY	LVS	CAL	PHO	DAR	CLT	BRI	ATL	HOM	HOM	TAL	POC	IRC	KEN	KEN	TEX	KAN; 13	ROA; 4	DRC	DOV	DOV	DAY	DAR	RCH; 9	RCH; 9	BRI	LVS	TAL	ROV; 31	KAN	TEX	MAR	PHO	33rd	147	
2021	Jordan Anderson Racing	31	Chevy	DAY	DRC	HOM	LVS	PHO	ATL	MAR	TAL	DAR	DOV	COA	CLT	MOH	TEX	NSH	POC	ROA; 18	ATL	NHA	GLN	IRC	MCH	DAY	DAR	RCH	BRI	LVS	TAL	ROV	TEX; 15	KAN	MAR	PHO	92nd	0^{1}	
2022	Alpha Prime Racing	45	Chevy	DAY	CAL; 25	LVS; 23	PHO; 33	ATL	COA	RCH	MAR																										83rd	0^{1}	
2022	Big Machine Racing	48	Chevy									TAL; 29	DOV; 24	DAR	TEX	CLT	POR	NSH	ROA	ATL	NHA	POC	IRC; 32	MCH; 18	GLN; 5	DAY	DAR	KAN	BRI	TEX	TAL						83rd	0^{1}	
2022	Jesse Iwuji Motorsports	34	Chevy																													ROV; 35	LVS	HOM	MAR		83rd	0^{1}	
2022	Sam Hunt Racing	26	Toyota																																	PHO; 23	83rd	0^{1}	
2023	Sam Hunt Racing	26	Toyota	DAY; 32	CAL; 13	LVS; 23	PHO; 34	ATL; 35	COA; 18	RCH; 4	MAR; 15	TAL; 24	DOV; 12	DAR; 9	CLT; 16	PIR; 26	SON; 20	NSH; 16	CSC; 10	ATL; 14	NHA; 13	POC; 25	ROA; 7	MCH; 21	IRC; 9	GLN; 28	DAY; 20	DAR; 28	KAN; 10	BRI; 10	TEX; 29	ROV; 5	LVS; 35	HOM; 30	MAR; 28	PHO; 10	17th	617	
2024	RSS Racing	28	Ford	DAY	ATL	LVS	PHO	COA; DNQ	RCH	MAR	TEX	TAL	DOV	DAR	CLT	PIR	SON	IOW	NHA	NSH	CSC	POC	IND	MCH	DAY	DAR	ATL	GLN	BRI	KAN	TAL	ROV	LVS	HOM	MAR	PHO	111th	0^{1}	
2025	Sam Hunt Racing	24	Toyota	DAY	ATL	COA	PHO	LVS	HOM	MAR	DAR	BRI	CAR	TAL	TEX	CLT	NSH	MXC	POC	ATL	CSC; 22	SON				GLN; 11	DAY	PIR	GTW	BRI	KAN	ROV; 4	LVS	TAL	MAR	PHO	83rd	0^{1}	
2025	Our Motorsports	5	Chevy																				DOV; 31	IND	IOW												83rd	0^{1}	

==== Craftsman Truck Series ====
NASCAR Craftsman Truck Series results
Year	Team	No.	Make	1	2	3	4	5	6	7	8	9	10	11	12	13	14	15	16	17	18	19	20	21	22	23	24	25	NCTC	Pts	Ref
2016	GMS Racing	33	Chevy	DAY	ATL	MAR; 31	KAN	DOV; 10	CLT	TEX																			28th	132	
2016	GMS Racing	24	Chevy								IOW; 29	GTW; 8	KEN	ELD	POC	BRI; 11	MCH	MSP; 26	CHI	NHA; 7	LVS	TAL	MAR; 15	TEX	PHO; 28	HOM			28th	132	
2017	GMS Racing	33	Chevy	**DAY**; 1	ATL; 15	MAR; 15	KAN; 8	CLT; 30	DOV; 2	TEX; 10	GTW; 13	IOW; 24	KEN; 24	ELD; 31	POC; 23	MCH; 12	BRI; 28	MSP; 3	CHI; 9	NHA; 10	LVS; 5	TAL; 29	MAR; 7	TEX; 6	PHO; 5	HOM; 13			7th	2214	
2020	Niece Motorsports	44	Chevy	DAY	LVS	CLT	ATL	HOM	POC	KEN	TEX	KAN	KAN	MCH	DRC	DOV	GTW	DAR	RCH	BRI	LVS	TAL; 9	KAN	TEX	MAR	PHO			84th	0^{1}	
2021	Young's Motorsports	02	Chevy	DAY	DRC; 8	LVS	ATL	BRD	RCH	KAN	DAR	COA; 2	CLT	TEX	NSH	POC	KNX	GLN; 12	GTW	DAR	BRI	LVS	TAL	MAR	PHO				41st	74^{2}	
2022	Young's Motorsports	02	Chevy	DAY	LVS; 30	ATL	COA; 14	MAR	BRD; 26	DAR	KAN	TEX	CLT	GTW	SON; 14	KNX; 26	NSH	MOH; 7	POC; 23	IRP; 20	RCH; 22	KAN; 18	BRI	TAL; 18	HOM; 18	PHO			26th	221	
2023	Tricon Garage	1	Toyota	DAY	LVS; 17	ATL	COA; 9	TEX	BRD	MAR	KAN	DAR	NWS	CLT	GTW	NSH	MOH	POC; 31	RCH	IRP	MLW	KAN	BRI	TAL	HOM	PHO			96th	0^{1}	
2026	Halmar Friesen Racing	62	Toyota	DAY	ATL	STP	DAR	CAR	BRI	TEX	GLN	DOV	CLT	NSH	MCH	COR; 3	LRP	NWS	IRP	RCH	NHA	BRI	KAN	CLT	PHO	TAL	MAR	HOM	54th	34	

^{*} Season still in progress
^{1} Ineligible for series points
^{2} Switched from Cup to Truck points on May 4

==== K&N Pro Series East ====
NASCAR K&N Pro Series East results
Year	Team	No.	Make	1	2	3	4	5	6	7	8	9	10	11	12	13	14	15	16	NKNPSEC	Pts	Ref
2014	Turner Scott Motorsports	31	Chevy	NSM; 10	DAY; 10	BRI; 20	GRE; 7	RCH; 14	IOW; 22	BGS; 11	FIF; 16	LGY; 5	NHA; 10	COL; 8	IOW; 8	GLN; 4	VIR; 5	GRE; 11	DOV; 2	7th	542	
2015	Ben Kennedy Racing	3	Toyota	NSM; 18	GRE; 6	BRI; 4	IOW; 17	BGS; 7	LGY; 17	COL; 3	NHA; 3	IOW; 7	GLN; 15	MOT; 7	VIR; 2	RCH; 8	DOV; 19			7th	483	
2016	Ben Kennedy Racing	3	Toyota	NSM; 15	MOB; 5	GRE; 9	BRI; 3	VIR; 20	DOM; 4	STA	COL	NHA; 21	IOW	GLN; 4	GRE	NJM	DOV			16th	272	

==== K&N Pro Series West ====
NASCAR K&N Pro Series West results
Year	Team	No.	Make	1	2	3	4	5	6	7	8	9	10	11	12	13	NKNPSWC	Pts	Ref
2015	Ben Kennedy Racing	3	Toyota	KCR	IRW	TUS	IOW	SHA	SON; 17	SLS	IOW	EVG	CNS	MER	AAS	PHO; 30	41st	41	

==== Pinty's Series ====
NASCAR Pinty's Series results
Year	Team	No.	Make	1	2	3	4	5	6	7	8	9	10	11	12	NPSC	Pts	Ref
2016	22 Racing	22	Dodge	MSP; 20	SSS	ACD	ICAR	TOR	EIR	SAS	CTR	RIS	MSP; 15	ASE	KWA	41st	53	

=== ARCA Racing Series ===
(key) (Bold – Pole position awarded by qualifying time. Italics – Pole position earned by points standings or practice time. * – Most laps led.)

ARCA Racing Series results
Year	Team	No.	Make	1	2	3	4	5	6	7	8	9	10	11	12	13	14	15	16	17	18	19	20	ARSC	Pts	Ref
2017	Mason Mitchell Motorsports	88	Chevy	DAY; 10	NSH	SLM	TAL	TOL	ELK	POC	MCH	MAD	IOW	IRP										48th	405	
2017	MDM Motorsports	41	Chevy												**POC**; 4	WIN	ISF	ROA	DSF	SLM	CHI	KEN	KAN	48th	405	

=== CARS Super Late Model Tour ===
(key)

CARS Super Late Model Tour results
Year	Team	No.	Make	1	2	3	4	5	6	7	8	9	10	CSLMTC	Pts	Ref
2015	Kyle Busch Motorsports	52	Toyota	SNM; 15	ROU								HCY; 19	20th	102	
2015	Kyle Busch Motorsports	51	Toyota			HCY; 16	SNM	TCM	MMS	ROU; 6	CON	MYB; 7		20th	102	

=== WeatherTech SportsCar Championship ===
(key)

==== 24 Hours of Daytona ====
24 Hours of Daytona results
Year	Class	No	Team	Car	Co-drivers	Laps	Position	Class Pos.
2016	GTD	16	(United States) Change Racing	Lamborghini Huracán GT3	(United States) Spencer Pumpelly (United States) Justin Marks (United States) Corey Lewis	521	42	18
2017	GTD	16	(United States) Change Racing	Lamborghini Huracán GT3	(United States) Corey Lewis (Netherlands) Jeroen Mul (United States) Brett Sandberg	79	52	25
