= 2024 Shriners Children's 500 =

Race details
- Race 4 of 36 in the 2024 NASCAR Cup Series
- Date: March 10, 2024
- Location: Phoenix Raceway in Avondale, Arizona
- Course: Permanent racing facility
- Course length: 1.022 miles (1.645 km)
- Distance: 312 laps, 312 mi (502.115 km)
- Average speed: 103.568 miles per hour (166.677 km/h)

Pole position
Driver	Denny Hamlin	Joe Gibbs Racing
- Time: 27.138

Most laps led
Drivers	Denny Hamlin	Joe Gibbs Racing
	Tyler Reddick	23XI Racing
- Laps: 68

Winner
No. 20	Christopher Bell	Joe Gibbs Racing

Television in the United States
- Network: Fox
- Announcers: Mike Joy, Clint Bowyer, and Kevin Harvick

Radio in the United States
- Radio: MRN
- Booth announcers: Alex Hayden, Jeff Striegle, and Todd Gordon
- Turn announcers: Dan Hubbard (1 & 2) and Kyle Rickey (3 & 4)

The 2024 Shriners Children's 500 was a NASCAR Cup Series race held on March 10, 2024, at Phoenix Raceway in Avondale, Arizona. Contested over 312 laps on the one mile (1.6 km) oval, and it was the fourth race of the 2024 NASCAR Cup Series season. Christopher Bell won the race. Chris Buescher finished 2nd, and Ty Gibbs finished 3rd. Brad Keselowski and Ryan Blaney rounded out the top five, and Ross Chastain, Martin Truex Jr., Michael McDowell, Chase Briscoe, and Tyler Reddick rounded out the top ten.

== Report ==
=== Background ===
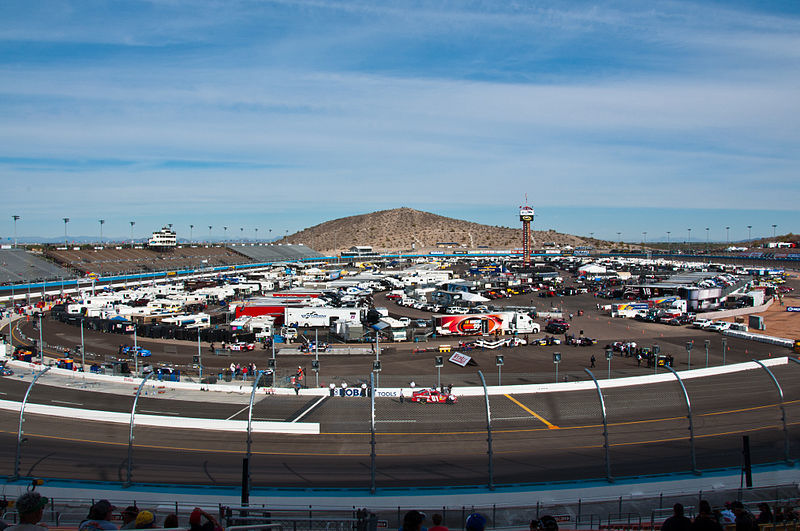
Phoenix Raceway, the track where the race was held.

Phoenix Raceway is a 1-mile, low-banked tri-oval race track located in Avondale, Arizona, near Phoenix. The motorsport track opened in 1964 and currently hosts two NASCAR race weekends annually including the final championship race since 2020. Phoenix Raceway has also hosted the CART, IndyCar Series, USAC and the WeatherTech SportsCar Championship. The raceway is currently owned and operated by NASCAR.

==== Entry list ====
- (R) denotes rookie driver.
- (i) denotes driver who is ineligible for series driver points.

No.	Driver	Team	Manufacturer
1	Ross Chastain	Trackhouse Racing	Chevrolet
2	Austin Cindric	Team Penske	Ford
3	Austin Dillon	Richard Childress Racing	Chevrolet
4	Josh Berry (R)	Stewart–Haas Racing	Ford
5	Kyle Larson	Hendrick Motorsports	Chevrolet
6	Brad Keselowski	RFK Racing	Ford
7	Corey LaJoie	Spire Motorsports	Chevrolet
8	Kyle Busch	Richard Childress Racing	Chevrolet
9	Chase Elliott	Hendrick Motorsports	Chevrolet
10	Noah Gragson	Stewart–Haas Racing	Ford
11	Denny Hamlin	Joe Gibbs Racing	Toyota
12	Ryan Blaney	Team Penske	Ford
14	Chase Briscoe	Stewart–Haas Racing	Ford
15	Kaz Grala (R)	Rick Ware Racing	Ford
16	Derek Kraus	Kaulig Racing	Chevrolet
17	Chris Buescher	RFK Racing	Ford
19	Martin Truex Jr.	Joe Gibbs Racing	Toyota
20	Christopher Bell	Joe Gibbs Racing	Toyota
21	Harrison Burton	Wood Brothers Racing	Ford
22	Joey Logano	Team Penske	Ford
23	Bubba Wallace	23XI Racing	Toyota
24	William Byron	Hendrick Motorsports	Chevrolet
31	Daniel Hemric	Kaulig Racing	Chevrolet
34	Michael McDowell	Front Row Motorsports	Ford
38	Todd Gilliland	Front Row Motorsports	Ford
41	Ryan Preece	Stewart–Haas Racing	Ford
42	John Hunter Nemechek	Legacy Motor Club	Toyota
43	Erik Jones	Legacy Motor Club	Toyota
45	Tyler Reddick	23XI Racing	Toyota
47	Ricky Stenhouse Jr.	JTG Daugherty Racing	Chevrolet
48	Alex Bowman	Hendrick Motorsports	Chevrolet
51	Justin Haley	Rick Ware Racing	Ford
54	Ty Gibbs	Joe Gibbs Racing	Toyota
71	Zane Smith (R)	Spire Motorsports	Chevrolet
77	Carson Hocevar (R)	Spire Motorsports	Chevrolet
99	Daniel Suárez	Trackhouse Racing	Chevrolet
Official entry list

== Practice ==
Joey Logano was the fastest in the practice session with a time of 27.446 seconds and a speed of 131.167 mph (211.093 km/h).

=== Practice results ===
Pos	No.	Driver	Team	Manufacturer	Time	Speed
1	22	Joey Logano	Team Penske	Ford	27.446	131.167
2	11	Denny Hamlin	Joe Gibbs Racing	Toyota	27.464	131.081
3	45	Tyler Reddick	23XI Racing	Toyota	27.467	131.066
Official practice results

== Qualifying ==
Denny Hamlin scored the pole for the race with a time of 27.138 and a speed of 132.655 mph (213.488 km/h).

=== Qualifying results ===
Pos	No.	Driver	Team	Manufacturer	R1	R2
1	11	Denny Hamlin	Joe Gibbs Racing	Toyota	27.022	27.138
2	54	Ty Gibbs	Joe Gibbs Racing	Toyota	27.160	27.226
3	9	Chase Elliott	Hendrick Motorsports	Chevrolet	27.137	27.243
4	43	Erik Jones	Legacy Motor Club	Toyota	27.116	27.249
5	24	William Byron	Hendrick Motorsports	Chevrolet	27.106	27.269
6	45	Tyler Reddick	23XI Racing	Toyota	27.096	27.270
7	10	Noah Gragson	Stewart-Haas Racing	Ford	27.176	27.332
8	14	Chase Briscoe	Stewart-Haas Racing	Ford	27.133	27.363
9	34	Michael McDowell	Front Row Motorsports	Ford	27.091	27.440
10	77	Carson Hocevar (R)	Spire Motorsports	Chevrolet	27.133	27.497
11	19	Martin Truex Jr.	Joe Gibbs Racing	Toyota	27.205	—
12	1	Ross Chastain	Trackhouse Racing	Chevrolet	27.161	—
13	20	Christopher Bell	Joe Gibbs Racing	Toyota	27.206	—
14	17	Chris Buescher	RFK Racing	Ford	27.189	—
15	99	Daniel Suárez	Trackhouse Racing	Chevrolet	27.230	—
16	12	Ryan Blaney	Team Penske	Ford	27.202	—
17	5	Kyle Larson	Hendrick Motorsports	Chevrolet	27.243	—
18	6	Brad Keselowski	RFK Racing	Ford	27.203	—
19	42	John Hunter Nemechek	Legacy Motor Club	Toyota	27.278	—
20	47	Ricky Stenhouse Jr.	JTG Daugherty Racing	Chevrolet	27.277	—
21	31	Daniel Hemric	Kaulig Racing	Chevrolet	27.290	—
22	23	Bubba Wallace	23XI Racing	Toyota	27.303	—
23	22	Joey Logano	Team Penske	Ford	27.309	—
24	21	Harrison Burton	Wood Brothers Racing	Ford	27.341	—
25	48	Alex Bowman	Hendrick Motorsports	Chevrolet	27.311	—
26	16	Derek Kraus	Kaulig Racing	Chevrolet	27.388	—
27	41	Ryan Preece	Stewart-Haas Racing	Ford	27.390	—
28	71	Zane Smith (R)	Spire Motorsports	Chevrolet	27.400	—
29	38	Todd Gilliland	Front Row Motorsports	Ford	27.398	—
30	3	Austin Dillon	Richard Childress Racing	Chevrolet	27.455	—
31	8	Kyle Busch	Richard Childress Racing	Chevrolet	27.422	—
32	15	Kaz Grala (R)	Rick Ware Racing	Ford	27.582	—
33	51	Justin Haley	Rick Ware Racing	Ford	27.479	—
34	2	Austin Cindric	Team Penske	Ford	27.622	—
35	7	Corey LaJoie	Spire Motorsports	Chevrolet	27.877	—
36	4	Josh Berry (R)	Stewart-Haas Racing	Ford	38.424	—
Official qualifying results

== Race ==
=== Race results ===
==== Stage Results ====
Stage One Laps: 60

Pos	No	Driver	Team	Manufacturer	Points
1	45	Tyler Reddick	23XI Racing	Toyota	10
2	54	Ty Gibbs	Joe Gibbs Racing	Toyota	9
3	11	Denny Hamlin	Joe Gibbs Racing	Toyota	8
4	43	Erik Jones	Legacy Motor Club	Toyota	7
5	9	Chase Elliott	Hendrick Motorsports	Chevrolet	6
6	24	William Byron	Hendrick Motorsports	Chevrolet	5
7	12	Ryan Blaney	Team Penske	Ford	4
8	34	Michael McDowell	Front Row Motorsports	Ford	3
9	14	Chase Briscoe	Stewart-Haas Racing	Ford	2
10	19	Martin Truex Jr.	Joe Gibbs Racing	Toyota	1
Official stage one results

Stage Two Laps: 125

Pos	No	Driver	Team	Manufacturer	Points
1	20	Christopher Bell	Joe Gibbs Racing	Toyota	10
2	45	Tyler Reddick	23XI Racing	Toyota	9
3	11	Denny Hamlin	Joe Gibbs Racing	Toyota	8
4	24	William Byron	Hendrick Motorsports	Chevrolet	7
5	19	Martin Truex Jr.	Joe Gibbs Racing	Toyota	6
6	12	Ryan Blaney	Team Penske	Ford	5
7	9	Chase Elliott	Hendrick Motorsports	Chevrolet	4
8	10	Noah Gragson	Stewart-Haas Racing	Ford	3
9	6	Brad Keselowski	RFK Racing	Ford	2
10	17	Chris Buescher	RFK Racing	Ford	1
Official stage two results

=== Final Stage Results ===
Stage Three Laps: 127

Pos	Grid	No	Driver	Team	Manufacturer	Laps	Points
1	13	20	Christopher Bell	Joe Gibbs Racing	Toyota	312	50
2	14	17	Chris Buescher	RFK Racing	Ford	312	36
3	2	54	Ty Gibbs	Joe Gibbs Racing	Toyota	312	43
4	18	6	Brad Keselowski	RFK Racing	Ford	312	35
5	16	12	Ryan Blaney	Team Penske	Ford	312	41
6	12	1	Ross Chastain	Trackhouse Racing	Chevrolet	312	31
7	11	19	Martin Truex Jr.	Joe Gibbs Racing	Toyota	312	37
8	9	34	Michael McDowell	Front Row Motorsports	Ford	312	32
9	8	14	Chase Briscoe	Stewart-Haas Racing	Ford	312	30
10	6	45	Tyler Reddick	23XI Racing	Toyota	312	46
11	1	11	Denny Hamlin	Joe Gibbs Racing	Toyota	312	42
12	7	10	Noah Gragson	Stewart-Haas Racing	Ford	312	28
13	15	99	Daniel Suárez	Trackhouse Racing	Chevrolet	312	24
14	17	5	Kyle Larson	Hendrick Motorsports	Chevrolet	312	23
15	10	77	Carson Hocevar (R)	Spire Motorsports	Chevrolet	312	22
16	22	23	Bubba Wallace	23XI Racing	Toyota	312	21
17	29	38	Todd Gilliland	Front Row Motorsports	Ford	312	20
18	5	24	William Byron	Hendrick Motorsports	Chevrolet	312	31
19	3	9	Chase Elliott	Hendrick Motorsports	Chevrolet	312	28
20	25	48	Alex Bowman	Hendrick Motorsports	Chevrolet	312	17
21	20	47	Ricky Stenhouse Jr.	JTG Daugherty Racing	Chevrolet	312	16
22	31	8	Kyle Busch	Richard Childress Racing	Chevrolet	311	15
23	27	41	Ryan Preece	Stewart-Haas Racing	Ford	311	14
24	33	51	Justin Haley	Rick Ware Racing	Ford	311	13
25	19	42	John Hunter Nemechek	Legacy Motor Club	Toyota	311	12
26	36	4	Josh Berry (R)	Stewart-Haas Racing	Ford	310	11
27	24	21	Harrison Burton	Wood Brothers Racing	Ford	310	10
28	21	31	Daniel Hemric	Kaulig Racing	Chevrolet	310	9
29	28	71	Zane Smith (R)	Spire Motorsports	Chevrolet	309	8
30	32	15	Kaz Grala (R)	Rick Ware Racing	Ford	309	7
31	4	43	Erik Jones	Legacy Motor Club	Toyota	305	13
32	30	3	Austin Dillon	Richard Childress Racing	Chevrolet	304	5
33	35	7	Corey LaJoie	Spire Motorsports	Chevrolet	204	4
34	23	22	Joey Logano	Team Penske	Ford	203	3
35	26	16	Derek Kraus	Kaulig Racing	Chevrolet	203	2
36	34	2	Austin Cindric	Team Penske	Ford	6	1
Official race results

=== Race statistics ===
- Lead changes: 10 among 6 different drivers
- Cautions/Laps: 6 for 40 laps
- Red flags: 0
- Time of race: 3 hours, 0 minutes and 45 seconds
- Average speed: 103.568 miles per hour (166.677 km/h)

== Media ==
=== Television ===
Fox Sports covered their 19th race at the Phoenix Raceway. Mike Joy, Clint Bowyer, and nine-time Phoenix winner Kevin Harvick called the race from the broadcast booth. Jamie Little and Regan Smith handled pit road for the television side, and Larry McReynolds provided insight from the Fox Sports studio in Charlotte.

Fox
Booth announcers	Pit reporters	In-race analyst
Lap-by-lap: Mike Joy; Color-commentator: Clint Bowyer; Color-commentator: Kevin Harvick	Jamie Little; Regan Smith	Larry McReynolds

=== Radio ===
MRN covered the radio action for the race which was also simulcasted on Sirius XM NASCAR Radio. Alex Hayden, Jeff Striegle, and former crew chief Todd Gordon called the race when the field races past the start/finish line. Dan Hubbard called the action from turns 1 & 2, and Kyle Rickey called the action from turns 3 & 4. Pit lane was manned by Steve Post, Kim Coon, and Jacklyn Drake.

MRN
Booth announcers	Turn announcers	Pit reporters
Lead announcer: Alex Hayden; Announcer: Jeff Striegle; Announcer: Todd Gordon	Turns 1 & 2: Dan Hubbard; Turns 3 & 4: Kyle Rickey	Steve Post; Kim Coon; Jacklyn Drake

== Standings after the race ==
Drivers' Championship standings

	Pos	Driver	Points
1	1	Ryan Blaney	151
1	2	Kyle Larson	141 (–10)
	3	Martin Truex Jr.	141 (–10)
	4	William Byron	134 (–17)
7	5	Tyler Reddick	130 (–21)
3	6	Ty Gibbs	130 (–21)
2	7	Ross Chastain	129 (–22)
2	8	Denny Hamlin	129 (–22)
2	9	Chase Elliott	123 (–28)
2	10	Daniel Suárez	114 (–37)
5	11	Kyle Busch	110 (–41)
9	12	Christopher Bell	102 (–49)
	13	Alex Bowman	99 (–52)
	14	Bubba Wallace	97 (–54)
4	15	Austin Cindric	87 (–64)
7	16	Chris Buescher	86 (–65)
Official driver's standings

Manufacturers' Championship standings

Pos	Manufacturer	Points
1	Chevrolet	151
2	Toyota	141 (–10)
3	Ford	132 (–19)

- Note: Only the first 16 positions are included for the driver standings.

Previous race: 2024 Pennzoil 400	NASCAR Cup Series; 2024 season	Next race: 2024 Food City 500
