= 2024 EchoPark Automotive Grand Prix =

NASCAR Cup Series race

Race details
- Race 6 of 36 in the 2024 NASCAR Cup Series
- Date: March 24, 2024
- Location: Circuit of the Americas in Austin, Texas
- Course: Permanent racing facility
- Course length: 3.426 miles (5.514 km)
- Distance: 68 laps, 231 mi (372 km)
- Average speed: 85.224 miles per hour (137.155 km/h)

Pole position
Driver	William Byron	Hendrick Motorsports
- Time: 2:09.636

Most laps led
Driver	William Byron	Hendrick Motorsports
- Laps: 42

Winner
No. 24	William Byron	Hendrick Motorsports

Television in the United States
- Network: Fox
- Announcers: Mike Joy, Clint Bowyer, and Kevin Harvick

Radio in the United States
- Radio: PRN
- Booth announcers: Doug Rice and Mark Garrow
- Turn announcers: Rob Albright (1), Doug Turnbull (2 to Becketts), Alan Cavanna (Chapel to S to Senna), Nick Yeoman (Sepang Hairpin), Pat Patterson (Motodrom), and Brad Gillie (Istanbul 8 to Turn 20)

The 2024 EchoPark Automotive Grand Prix was a NASCAR Cup Series race held on March 24, 2024, at Circuit of the Americas in Austin, Texas. Contested over 68 laps on the 3.426-mile (5.514 km) road course, it was the sixth race of the 2024 NASCAR Cup Series season. William Byron won the race. Christopher Bell finished 2nd, and Ty Gibbs finished 3rd. Alex Bowman and Tyler Reddick rounded out the top five, and A. J. Allmendinger, Ross Chastain, Chris Buescher, Kyle Busch, and Martin Truex Jr. rounded out the top ten.

== Report ==
=== Background ===
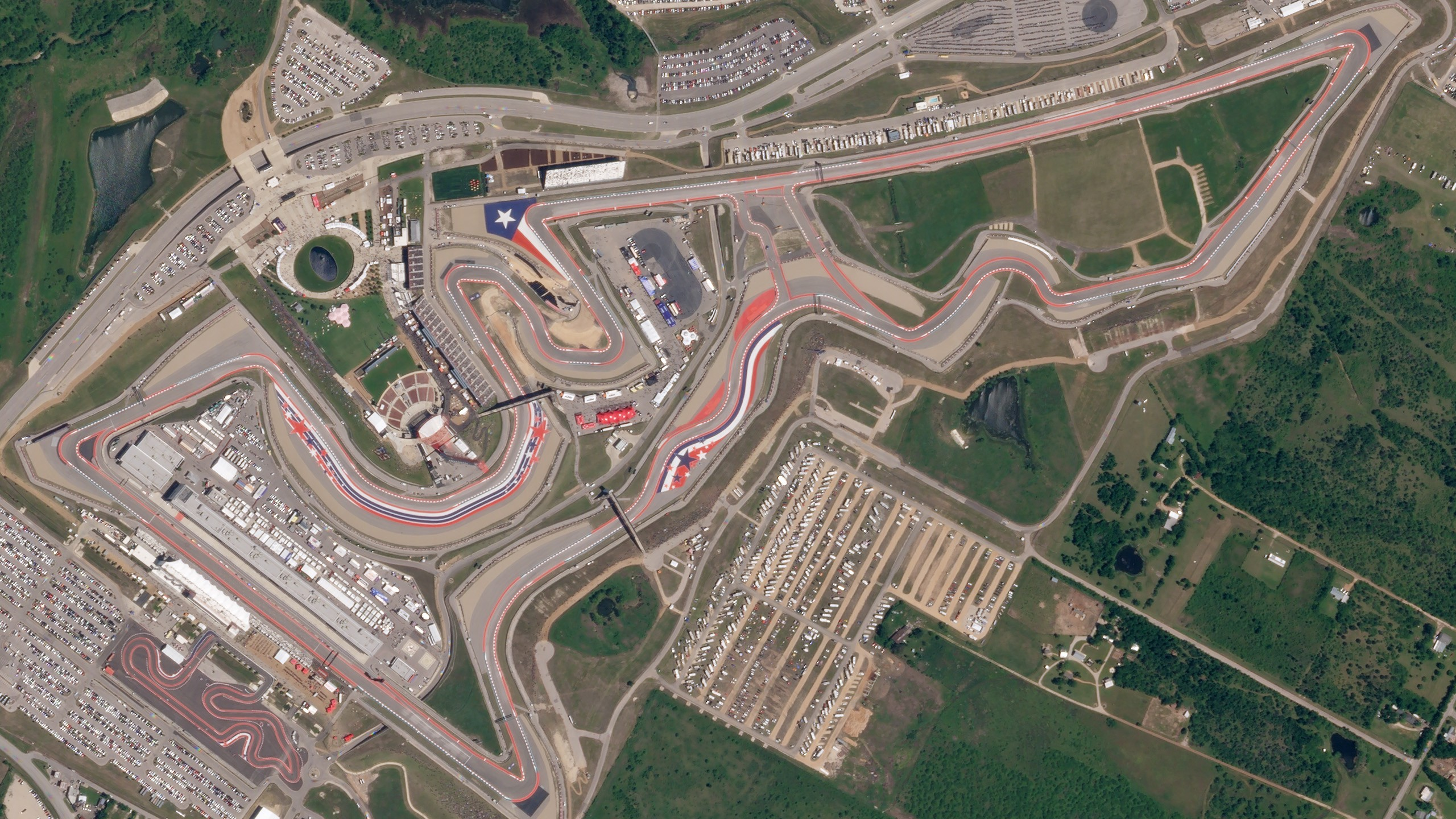
Aerial view of Circuit of the Americas, the track where the race was held.

Circuit of the Americas (COTA) is a grade 1 FIA-specification motorsports facility located within the extraterritorial jurisdiction of Austin, Texas. It features a 3.426-mile (5.514 km) road racing circuit. The facility is home to the Formula One United States Grand Prix, and the Motorcycle Grand Prix of the Americas, a round of the FIM Road Racing World Championship. It previously hosted the Supercars Championship, the FIA World Endurance Championship, the IMSA SportsCar Championship, and IndyCar Series.

==== Entry list ====
- (R) denotes rookie driver.
- (i) denotes driver who is ineligible for series driver points.

No.	Driver	Team	Manufacturer
1	Ross Chastain	Trackhouse Racing	Chevrolet
2	Austin Cindric	Team Penske	Ford
3	Austin Dillon	Richard Childress Racing	Chevrolet
4	Josh Berry (R)	Stewart–Haas Racing	Ford
5	Kyle Larson	Hendrick Motorsports	Chevrolet
6	Brad Keselowski	RFK Racing	Ford
7	Corey LaJoie	Spire Motorsports	Chevrolet
8	Kyle Busch	Richard Childress Racing	Chevrolet
9	Chase Elliott	Hendrick Motorsports	Chevrolet
10	Noah Gragson	Stewart–Haas Racing	Ford
11	Denny Hamlin	Joe Gibbs Racing	Toyota
12	Ryan Blaney	Team Penske	Ford
13	A. J. Allmendinger (i)	Kaulig Racing	Chevrolet
14	Chase Briscoe	Stewart–Haas Racing	Ford
15	Kaz Grala (R)	Rick Ware Racing	Ford
16	Shane van Gisbergen (i)	Kaulig Racing	Chevrolet
17	Chris Buescher	RFK Racing	Ford
19	Martin Truex Jr.	Joe Gibbs Racing	Toyota
20	Christopher Bell	Joe Gibbs Racing	Toyota
21	Harrison Burton	Wood Brothers Racing	Ford
22	Joey Logano	Team Penske	Ford
23	Bubba Wallace	23XI Racing	Toyota
24	William Byron	Hendrick Motorsports	Chevrolet
31	Daniel Hemric	Kaulig Racing	Chevrolet
34	Michael McDowell	Front Row Motorsports	Ford
38	Todd Gilliland	Front Row Motorsports	Ford
41	Ryan Preece	Stewart–Haas Racing	Ford
42	John Hunter Nemechek	Legacy Motor Club	Toyota
43	Erik Jones	Legacy Motor Club	Toyota
45	Tyler Reddick	23XI Racing	Toyota
47	Ricky Stenhouse Jr.	JTG Daugherty Racing	Chevrolet
48	Alex Bowman	Hendrick Motorsports	Chevrolet
50	Kamui Kobayashi	23XI Racing	Toyota
51	Justin Haley	Rick Ware Racing	Ford
54	Ty Gibbs	Joe Gibbs Racing	Toyota
66	Timmy Hill (i)	Power Source	Ford
71	Zane Smith (R)	Spire Motorsports	Chevrolet
77	Carson Hocevar (R)	Spire Motorsports	Chevrolet
99	Daniel Suárez	Trackhouse Racing	Chevrolet
Official entry list

== Practice ==
William Byron was the fastest in the practice session with a time of 2:09:626 seconds and a speed of 94.703 mph (152.410 km/h).

=== Practice results ===
Pos	No.	Driver	Team	Manufacturer	Time	Speed
1	24	William Byron	Hendrick Motorsports	Chevrolet	2:09:626	94.703
2	54	Ty Gibbs	Joe Gibbs Racing	Toyota	2:09.656	94.681
3	48	Alex Bowman	Hendrick Motorsports	Chevrolet	2:10.021	94.416
Official practice results

== Qualifying ==
William Byron scored the pole for the race with a time of 2:09.636 and a speed of 94.696 mph (152.398 km/h).

=== Qualifying results ===
Pos	No.	Driver	Team	Manufacturer	R1	R2
1	24	William Byron	Hendrick Motorsports	Chevrolet	2:09.114	2:09.636
2	54	Ty Gibbs	Joe Gibbs Racing	Toyota	2:09.197	2:09.651
3	45	Tyler Reddick	23XI Racing	Toyota	2:09.133	2:09.816
4	20	Christopher Bell	Joe Gibbs Racing	Toyota	2:09.284	2:09.930
5	7	Corey LaJoie	Spire Motorsports	Chevrolet	2:09.937	2:10.463
6	1	Ross Chastain	Trackhouse Racing	Chevrolet	2:09.506	2:10.667
7	19	Martin Truex Jr.	Joe Gibbs Racing	Toyota	2:09.618	2:10.912
8	11	Denny Hamlin	Joe Gibbs Racing	Toyota	2:09.934	2:11.148
9	9	Chase Elliott	Hendrick Motorsports	Chevrolet	2:09.552	2:11.407
10	23	Bubba Wallace	23XI Racing	Toyota	2:09.574	2:23.570
11	2	Austin Cindric	Team Penske	Ford	2:09.626	—
12	16	Shane van Gisbergen (i)	Kaulig Racing	Chevrolet	2:09.944	—
13	51	Justin Haley	Rick Ware Racing	Ford	2:09.984	—
14	13	A. J. Allmendinger (i)	Kaulig Racing	Chevrolet	2:10.158	—
15	5	Kyle Larson	Hendrick Motorsports	Chevrolet	2:10.178	—
16	8	Kyle Busch	Richard Childress Racing	Chevrolet	2:10.201	—
17	48	Alex Bowman	Hendrick Motorsports	Chevrolet	2:10.190	—
18	77	Carson Hocevar (R)	Spire Motorsports	Chevrolet	2:10.333	—
19	99	Daniel Suárez	Trackhouse Racing	Chevrolet	2:10.230	—
20	17	Chris Buescher	RFK Racing	Ford	2:10.450	—
21	3	Austin Dillon	Richard Childress Racing	Chevrolet	2:10.276	—
22	42	John Hunter Nemechek	Legacy Motor Club	Toyota	2:10.568	—
23	15	Kaz Grala (R)	Rick Ware Racing	Ford	2:10.484	—
24	41	Ryan Preece	Stewart-Haas Racing	Ford	2:10.592	—
25	50	Kamui Kobayashi	23XI Racing	Toyota	2:10.513	—
26	38	Todd Gilliland	Front Row Motorsports	Ford	2:10.642	—
27	34	Michael McDowell	Front Row Motorsports	Ford	2:10.548	—
28	12	Ryan Blaney	Team Penske	Ford	2:10.644	—
29	4	Josh Berry (R)	Stewart-Haas Racing	Ford	2:10.947	—
30	47	Ricky Stenhouse Jr.	JTG Daugherty Racing	Chevrolet	2:10.742	—
31	31	Daniel Hemric	Kaulig Racing	Chevrolet	2:11.302	—
32	14	Chase Briscoe	Stewart-Haas Racing	Ford	2:10.818	—
33	21	Harrison Burton	Wood Brothers Racing	Ford	2:11.407	—
34	71	Zane Smith (R)	Spire Motorsports	Chevrolet	2:10.852	—
35	22	Joey Logano	Team Penske	Ford	2:12.166	—
36	6	Brad Keselowski	RFK Racing	Ford	2:11.152	—
37	66	Timmy Hill (i)	MBM Motorsports	Ford	2:15.739	—
38	43	Erik Jones	Legacy Motor Club	Toyota	2:11.545	—
39	10	Noah Gragson	Stewart-Haas Racing	Ford	2:45.860	—
Official qualifying results

== Race ==
=== Race results ===
==== Stage Results ====
Stage One Laps: 15

Pos	No	Driver	Team	Manufacturer	Points
1	20	Christopher Bell	Joe Gibbs Racing	Toyota	10
2	99	Daniel Suárez	Trackhouse Racing	Chevrolet	9
3	34	Michael McDowell	Front Row Motorsports	Ford	8
4	2	Austin Cindric	Team Penske	Ford	7
5	3	Austin Dillon	Richard Childress Racing	Chevrolet	6
6	47	Ricky Stenhouse Jr.	JTG Daugherty Racing	Chevrolet	5
7	24	William Byron	Hendrick Motorsports	Chevrolet	4
8	54	Ty Gibbs	Joe Gibbs Racing	Toyota	3
9	45	Tyler Reddick	23XI Racing	Toyota	2
10	1	Ross Chastain	Trackhouse Racing	Chevrolet	1
Official stage one results

Stage Two Laps: 15

Pos	No	Driver	Team	Manufacturer	Points
1	11	Denny Hamlin	Joe Gibbs Racing	Toyota	10
2	12	Ryan Blaney	Team Penske	Ford	9
3	19	Martin Truex Jr.	Joe Gibbs Racing	Toyota	8
4	38	Todd Gilliland	Front Row Motorsports	Ford	7
5	41	Ryan Preece	Stewart-Haas Racing	Ford	6
6	6	Brad Keselowski	RFK Racing	Ford	5
7	42	John Hunter Nemechek	Legacy Motor Club	Toyota	4
8	24	William Byron	Hendrick Motorsports	Chevrolet	3
9	31	Daniel Hemric	Kaulig Racing	Chevrolet	2
10	4	Josh Berry (R)	Stewart-Haas Racing	Ford	1
Official stage two results

=== Final Stage Results ===
Stage Three Laps: 38

Pos	Grid	No	Driver	Team	Manufacturer	Laps	Points
1	1	24	William Byron	Hendrick Motorsports	Chevrolet	68	47
2	4	20	Christopher Bell	Joe Gibbs Racing	Toyota	68	45
3	2	54	Ty Gibbs	Joe Gibbs Racing	Toyota	68	37
4	17	48	Alex Bowman	Hendrick Motorsports	Chevrolet	68	33
5	3	45	Tyler Reddick	23XI Racing	Toyota	68	34
6	14	13	A. J. Allmendinger (i)	Kaulig Racing	Chevrolet	68	0
7	6	1	Ross Chastain	Trackhouse Racing	Chevrolet	68	31
8	20	17	Chris Buescher	RFK Racing	Ford	68	29
9	16	8	Kyle Busch	Richard Childress Racing	Chevrolet	68	28
10	7	19	Martin Truex Jr.	Joe Gibbs Racing	Toyota	68	35
11	35	22	Joey Logano	Team Penske	Ford	68	26
12	28	12	Ryan Blaney	Team Penske	Ford	68	34
13	32	14	Chase Briscoe	Stewart-Haas Racing	Ford	68	24
14	8	11	Denny Hamlin	Joe Gibbs Racing	Toyota	68	33
15	10	23	Bubba Wallace	23XI Racing	Toyota	68	22
16	9	9	Chase Elliott	Hendrick Motorsports	Chevrolet	68	21
17	15	5	Kyle Larson	Hendrick Motorsports	Chevrolet	68	20
18	11	2	Austin Cindric	Team Penske	Ford	68	26
19	34	71	Zane Smith (R)	Spire Motorsports	Chevrolet	68	18
20	12	16	Shane van Gisbergen (i)	Kaulig Racing	Chevrolet	68	0
21	22	42	John Hunter Nemechek	Legacy Motor Club	Toyota	68	20
22	18	77	Carson Hocevar (R)	Spire Motorsports	Chevrolet	68	15
23	24	41	Ryan Preece	Stewart-Haas Racing	Ford	68	20
24	5	7	Corey LaJoie	Spire Motorsports	Chevrolet	68	13
25	21	3	Austin Dillon	Richard Childress Racing	Chevrolet	68	18
26	26	38	Todd Gilliland	Front Row Motorsports	Ford	68	18
27	23	15	Kaz Grala (R)	Rick Ware Racing	Ford	68	10
28	30	47	Ricky Stenhouse Jr.	JTG Daugherty Racing	Chevrolet	68	14
29	25	50	Kamui Kobayashi	23XI Racing	Toyota	68	8
30	33	21	Harrison Burton	Wood Brothers Racing	Ford	68	7
31	19	99	Daniel Suárez	Trackhouse Racing	Chevrolet	68	15
32	38	43	Erik Jones	Legacy Motor Club	Toyota	68	5
33	36	6	Brad Keselowski	RFK Racing	Ford	68	9
34	39	10	Noah Gragson	Stewart-Haas Racing	Ford	67	3
35	29	4	Josh Berry (R)	Stewart-Haas Racing	Ford	67	3
36	37	66	Timmy Hill (i)	MBM Motorsports	Ford	66	0
37	31	31	Daniel Hemric	Kaulig Racing	Chevrolet	66	3
38	27	34	Michael McDowell	Front Row Motorsports	Ford	51	9
DSQ	13	51	Justin Haley (Note: Haley originally finished 17th, but was later disqualified for failing to meet minimum weight requirements in post race inspection.)	Rick Ware Racing	Ford	68	1
Official race results

=== Race statistics ===
- Lead changes: 7 among 4 different drivers
- Cautions/Laps: 2 for 4 laps
- Red flags: 0
- Time of race: 3 hours, 47 minutes and 15 seconds
- Average speed: 85.224 miles per hour (137.155 km/h)

== Media ==
=== Television ===
Fox Sports covered the race on the television side. Mike Joy, Clint Bowyer, and Kevin Harvick called the race from the broadcast booth. Jamie Little and Regan Smith handled pit road for the television side, and Larry McReynolds provided insight from the Fox Sports studio in Charlotte.

Fox
Booth announcers	Pit reporters	In-race analyst
Lap-by-lap: Mike Joy; Color-commentator: Clint Bowyer; Color-commentator: Kevin Harvick	Jamie Little; Regan Smith	Larry McReynolds

=== Radio ===
PRN had the radio call for the race which was also simulcasted on Sirius XM NASCAR Radio.

PRN
Booth announcers	Turn announcers	Pit reporters
Lead announcer: Doug Rice; Announcer: Mark Garrow	Turn 1: Rob Albright; Turns 2 to Becketts: Doug Turnbull; Chapel to S do Senna: Alan Cavanna; To Sepang Hairpin: Nick Yeoman; Motodrom: Pat Patterson; Istanbul 8 to Turn 20: Brad Gillie	Wendy Venturini; Heather DeBeaux; Brett McMillan

== Standings after the race ==
Drivers' Championship standings

	Pos	Driver	Points
1	1	Martin Truex Jr.	220
1	2	Ty Gibbs	215 (–5)
1	3	Ryan Blaney	211 (–9)
1	4	Denny Hamlin	206 (–14)
4	5	Kyle Larson	205 (–15)
4	6	William Byron	183 (–37)
1	7	Christopher Bell	183 (–37)
1	8	Ross Chastain	182 (–38)
3	9	Chase Elliott	173 (–47)
1	10	Tyler Reddick	171 (–49)
1	11	Alex Bowman	165 (–55)
2	12	Chris Buescher	153 (–67)
3	13	Kyle Busch	150 (–70)
3	14	Daniel Suárez	148 (–72)
	15	John Hunter Nemechek	144 (–76)
3	16	Brad Keselowski	134 (–86)
Official driver's standings

Manufacturers' Championship standings

Pos	Manufacturer	Points
1	Chevrolet	224
2	Toyota	216 (–8)
3	Ford	195 (–29)

- Note: Only the first 16 positions are included for the driver standings.

Previous race: 2024 Food City 500	NASCAR Cup Series; 2024 season	Next race: 2024 Toyota Owners 400
