= Noah Gragson =

American racing driver (born 1998)

- Gragson at Las Vegas Motor Speedway in 2026
- Born: Noah Quinn Gragson; July 15, 1998 (age 28); Las Vegas, Nevada, U.S.
- Achievements: Tied with Sam Ard and Connor Zilisch for the most consecutive race victories in the NASCAR Xfinity Series (4 wins in 2022); 2023, 2024, 2025 NASCAR Cup Series All-Star Fan Vote Winner; 2018 Snowball Derby Winner; 2017 Winchester 400 Winner; 2015 Idaho 208 Winner
- Awards: 2022 NASCAR Xfinity Series Most Popular Driver; 2018 NASCAR Camping World Truck Series Most Popular Driver; 2015 NASCAR K&N Pro Series West Rookie of the Year

NASCAR Cup Series career
- 147 races run over 5 years
- Car no., team: No. 4 (Front Row Motorsports)
- 2026 position: 31st
- Best finish: 24th (2024)
- First race: 2022 Daytona 500 (Daytona)
- Last race: 2026 Season Finale 400 (Homestead)
Wins	Top tens	Poles
0	14	0

NASCAR O'Reilly Auto Parts Series career
- 139 races run over 6 years
- 2024 position: 85th
- Best finish: 2nd (2022)
- First race: 2018 ToyotaCare 250 (Richmond)
- Last race: 2024 Sport Clips Haircuts VFW 200 (Darlington)
- First win: 2020 NASCAR Racing Experience 300 (Daytona)
- Last win: 2022 Contender Boats 300 (Homestead)
Wins	Top tens	Poles
13	99	2

NASCAR FedEx Freight Truck Series career
- 47 races run over 3 years
- 2018 position: 2nd
- Best finish: 2nd (2018)
- First race: 2016 Lucas Oil 150 (Phoenix)
- Last race: 2018 Ford EcoBoost 200 (Homestead)
- First win: 2017 Texas Roadhouse 200 (Martinsville)
- Last win: 2018 37 Kind Days 250 (Kansas)
Wins	Top tens	Poles
2	30	9

NASCAR Canada Series career
- 2 races run over 2 years
- 2023 position: 48th
- Best finish: 35th (2018)
- First race: 2018 Clarington 200 (CTMP)
- Last race: 2023 Pinty's Fall Brawl (Delaware)
Wins	Top tens	Poles
0	2	0

ARCA Menards Series career
- 10 races run over 4 years
- Best finish: 34th (2017)
- First race: 2015 Crosley Brands 150 (Kentucky)
- Last race: 2018 General Tire #AnywhereIsPossible 200 (Pocono)
Wins	Top tens	Poles
0	5	1

ARCA Menards Series East career
- 17 races run over 3 years
- Best finish: 5th (2016)
- First race: 2015 Bully Hill Vineyards 125 (Watkins Glen)
- Last race: 2018 Great Outdoors RV Superstore 100 (Watkins Glen)
- First win: 2016 Stafford 150 (Stafford)
- Last win: 2016 JustDrive.com 125 (New Jersey)
Wins	Top tens	Poles
2	9	1

ARCA Menards Series West career
- 29 races run over 4 years
- Best finish: 2nd (2015)
- First race: 2015 NAPA Auto Parts 150 (Kern County)
- Last race: 2024 General Tire 200 (Sonoma)
- First win: 2015 NAPA Auto Parts Wildcat 150 (Tucson)
- Last win: 2019 Procore 200 (Sonoma)
Wins	Top tens	Poles
5	24	1
- Statistics up to date as of November 8, 2026.

Noah Quinn Gragson (born July 15, 1998) is an American professional stock car racing driver. He competes full-time in the NASCAR Cup Series, driving the No. 4 Ford Mustang Dark Horse SC for Front Row Motorsports.

== Racing career ==
=== Early career ===
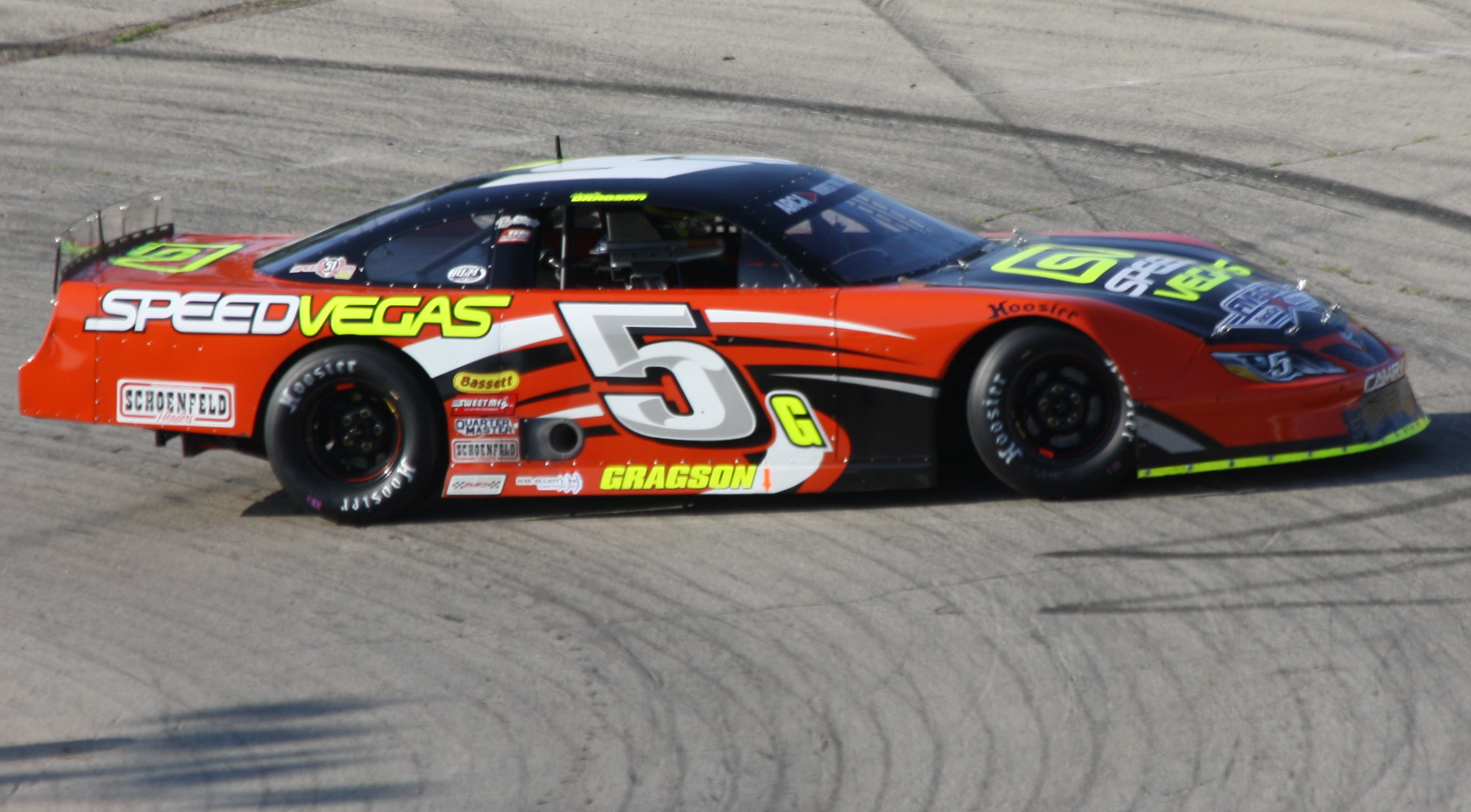
Gragson's ARCA Midwest Tour car at a 2016 Wisconsin International Raceway event

Gragson started racing Bandoleros at the Las Vegas Motor Speedway Bullring at the age of thirteen, eventually moving to compete in late models. Gragson also competed in the INEX Legends car racing series, winning the 2014 Young Lion Road Course championship.

=== Regional series ===
==== ARCA Menards Series West ====
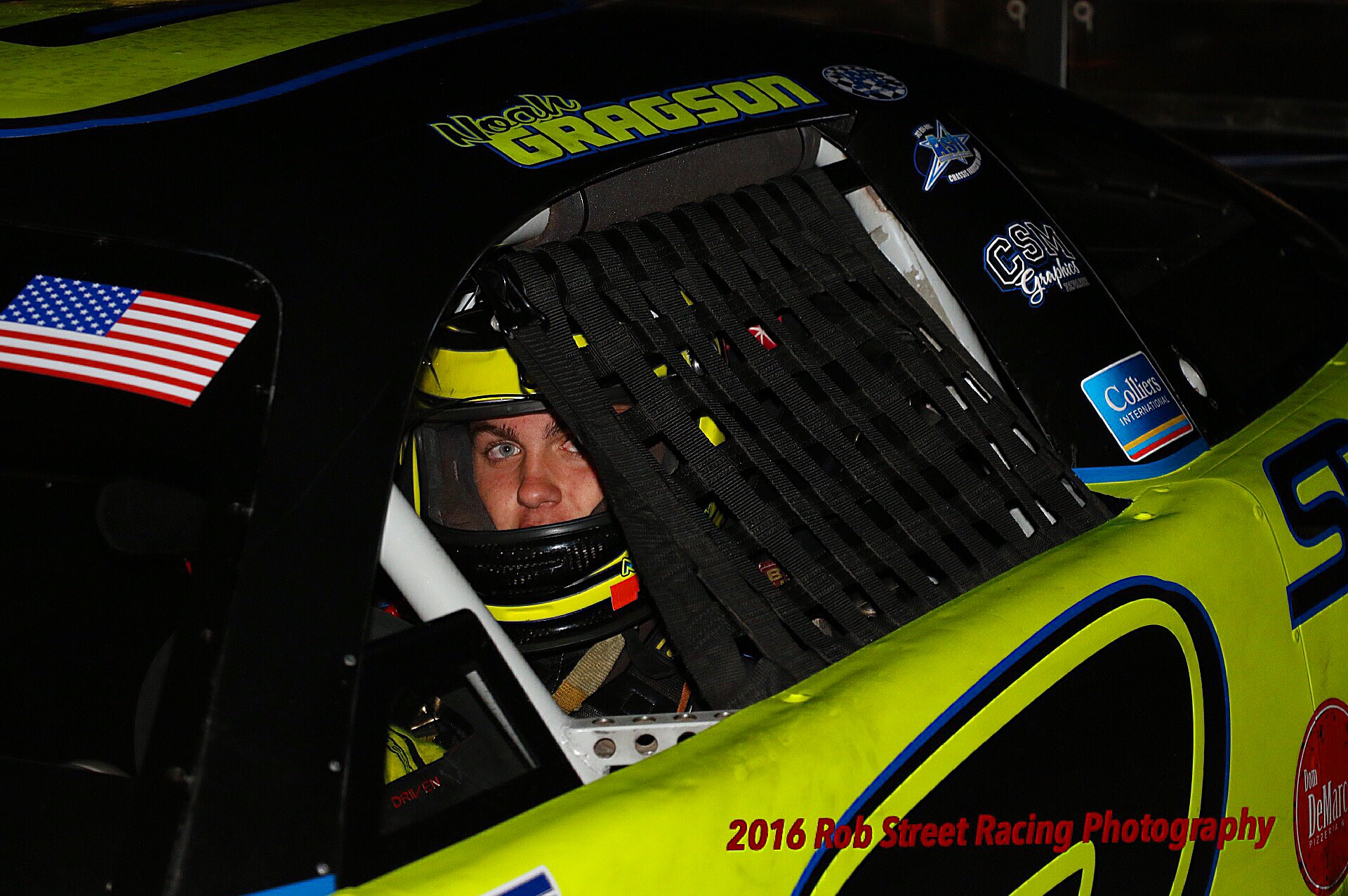
Gragson in 2016

In 2015, Gragson joined Jefferson Pitts Racing in the NASCAR K&N Pro Series West in the No. 7 with sponsorship from AlertID, his ride being overseen by co-owner Jerry Pitts. In his series debut at Kern County Raceway Park, he finished third after qualifying eighth. At Tucson Speedway, Gragson battled with teammate Gracin Raz to score his first career victory. Later in the season at Meridian Speedway, Gragson recorded his first pole position and led 176 laps to win. In his first season of stock car racing, Gragson finished second in the final points standings behind Chris Eggleston with two wins, seven top fives, eleven top tens, becoming the ninth driver in series history to finish runner-up in points and win Rookie of the Year. After the season ended, he was named Rookie of the Year.

Gragson would return to the West Series in 2019 in a one-off attempt for his old team, Jefferson Pitts Racing, in their No. 7 car in the race at Sonoma. He was announced to run the same race in 2024 in the No. 30 car for Rette Jones Racing in addition to competing part-time for the team in their new Xfinity Series car.

==== K&N Pro Series East ====
During the 2015 season, Gragson ran two races in the NASCAR K&N Pro Series East, finishing eighth in his debut at Watkins Glen International.

==== ARCA Racing Series ====
===== 2015–2018: Mason Mitchell Motorsports, Venturini Motorsports, and DGR Crosley =====
In 2015, Gragson joined Mason Mitchell Motorsports in the ARCA Racing Series, driving the No. 78 Ford Fusion at Kentucky Speedway. After qualifying eighth, he finished fourteenth, one lap behind race winner Ryan Reed.

In 2016, Gragson made two starts; one with Mason Mitchell Motorsports driving the No. 78 Chevrolet SS at Pocono finishing 30th and one in the season finale with Venturini Motorsports driving the No. 15 Toyota Camry at Kansas finishing 5th.

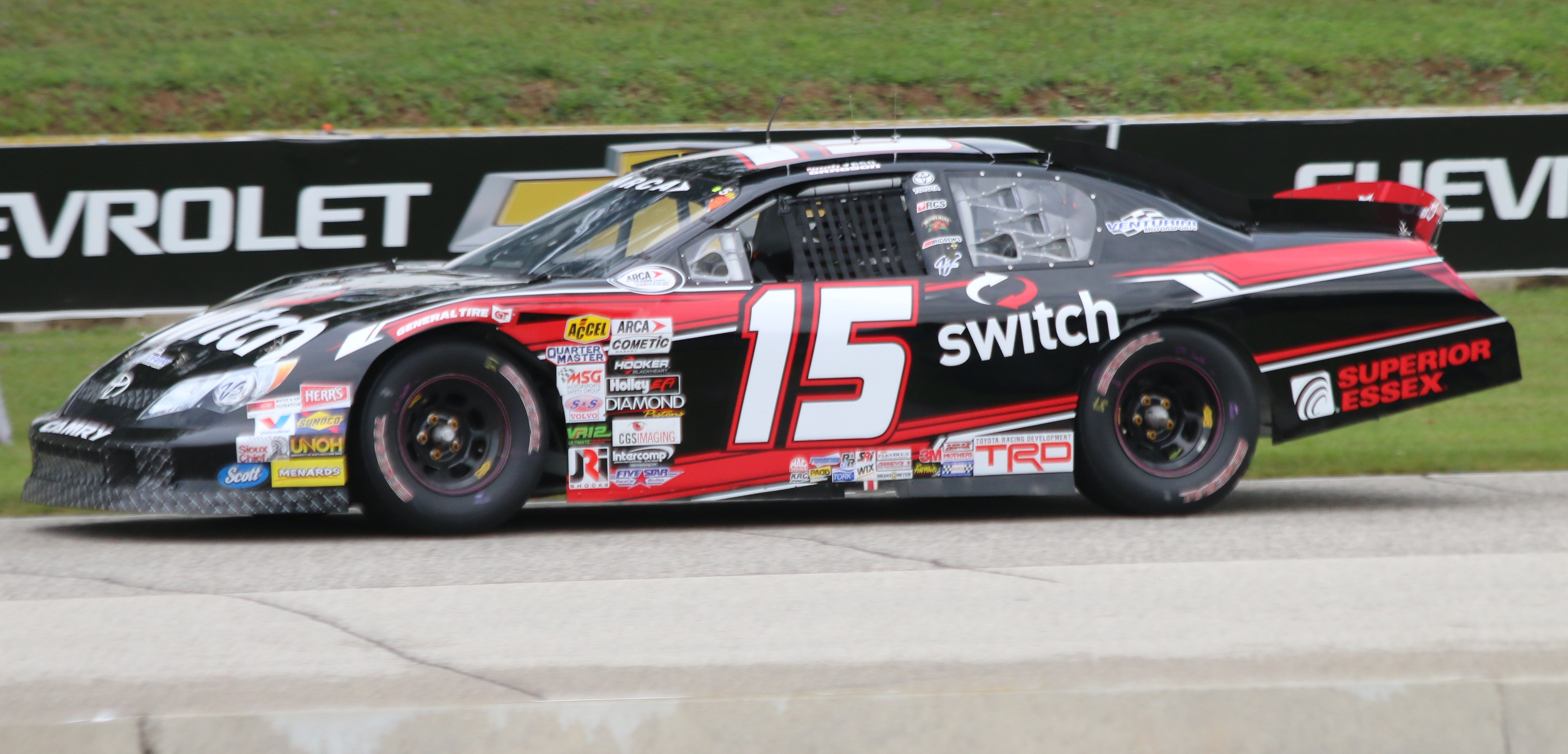
2017 ARCA car at Road America

In 2017, Gragson competed in five races with Venturini, with a best finish of fourth at Chicagoland.

In 2018, Gragson made two starts for DGR Crosley in the No. 54 Toyota Camry at Daytona, finishing seventh, and Pocono, where he scored the pole, dominated much of the early going, and finished tenth.

===== 2024: Rette Jones Racing =====
On April 30, 2024, it was announced that Gragson would return to ARCA and drive the No. 30 car for Rette Jones Racing in the race at Watkins Glen International in addition to running part-time for the team in their new Xfinity Series car.

=== Camping World Truck Series ===
==== 2016–2018: Wauters Motorsports and Kyle Busch Motorsports ====
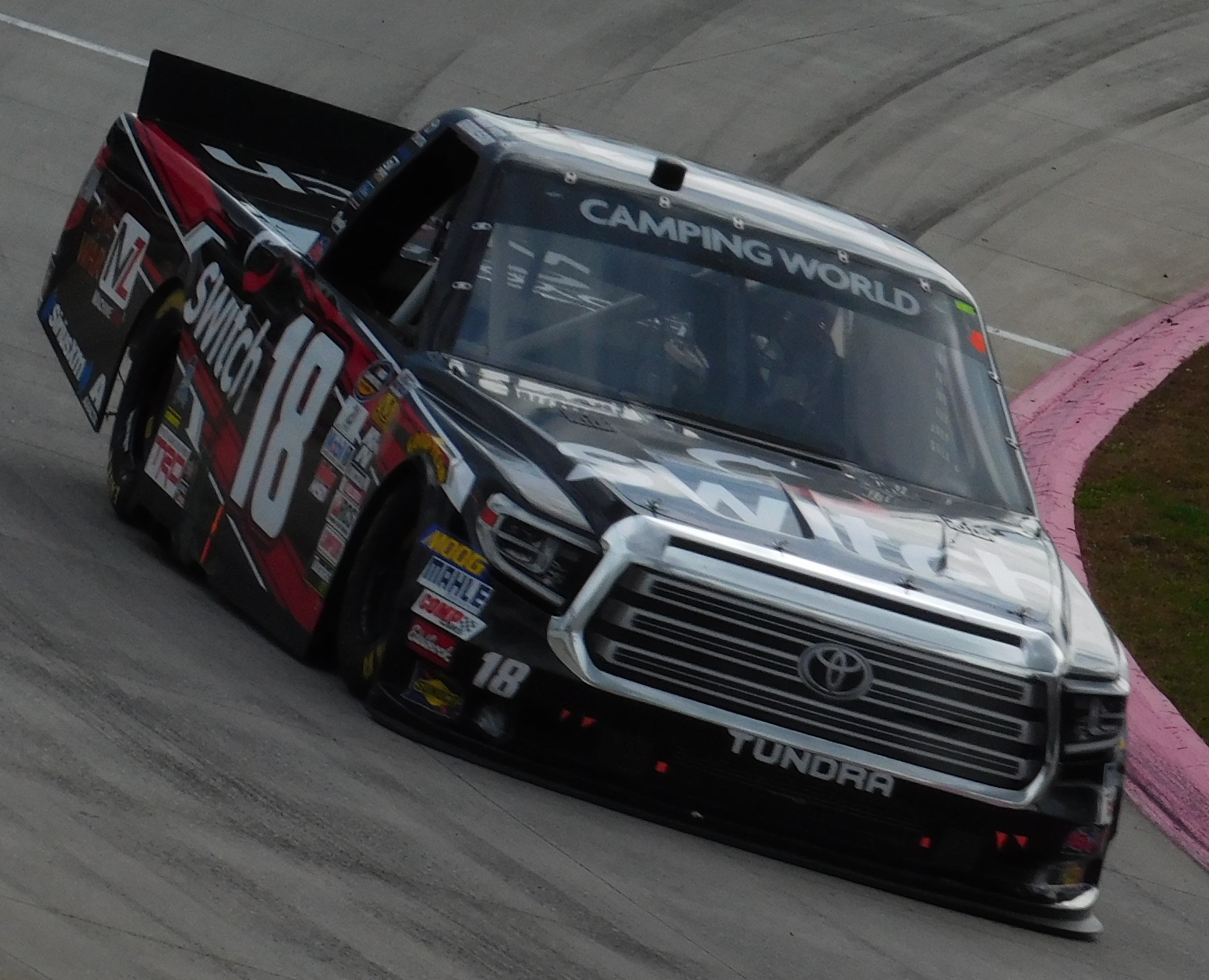
Gragson during the 2017 Texas Roadhouse 200

In preparation for the 2017 season, Gragson drove the No. 18 Toyota from Kyle Busch Motorsports at the Phoenix International Raceway and Homestead-Miami Speedway events in an entry fielded by Wauters Motorsports, who also fielded Super Late Model’s for Gragson. In his debut at Phoenix, Gragson qualified fourteenth and finished sixteenth. Gragson raced at Homestead as well, qualifying tenth and finishing fifteenth.

On October 7, 2016, Gragson was hired by Kyle Busch Motorsports to compete in the NASCAR Camping World Truck Series in 2017.

In 2017, Gragson recorded his first career Truck win in the fall at Martinsville Speedway in the Texas Roadhouse 200 after passing Matt Crafton for the lead on the outside with ten laps to go. He finished tenth in points.

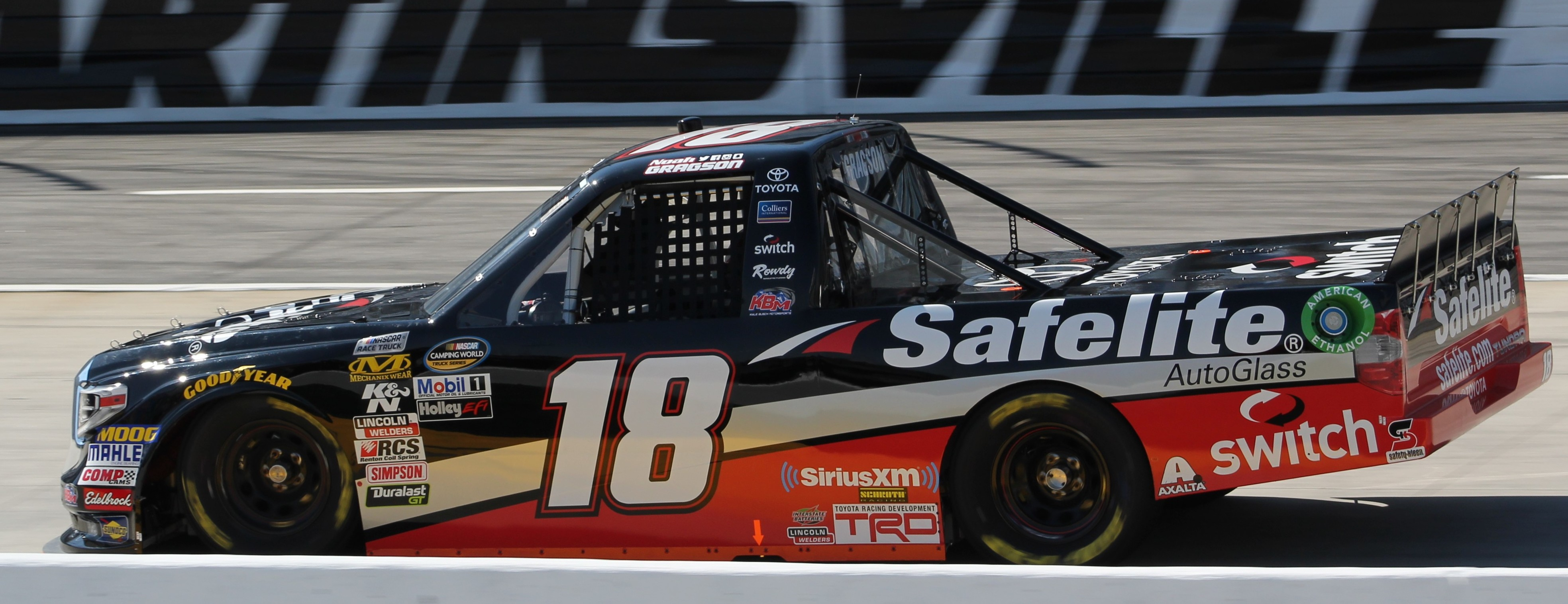
Gragson during the 2018 Alpha Energy Solutions 250

Gragson returned to the No. 18 KBM truck for the 2018 season.

A week after wrecking with two laps to go while battling with Johnny Sauter for the win at Dover, Gragson dominated at Kansas in the 37 Kind Days 250, leading 128 out of 167 laps to score his second career win.

During qualifying at Pocono Raceway, Gragson fell ill and was not cleared to race. Erik Jones replaced him for the race, but he was granted a playoff waiver and will still contend for the championship.

Gragson finished second in the points standings after finishing third at Homestead.

=== Xfinity Series ===
==== 2018: Joe Gibbs Racing ====
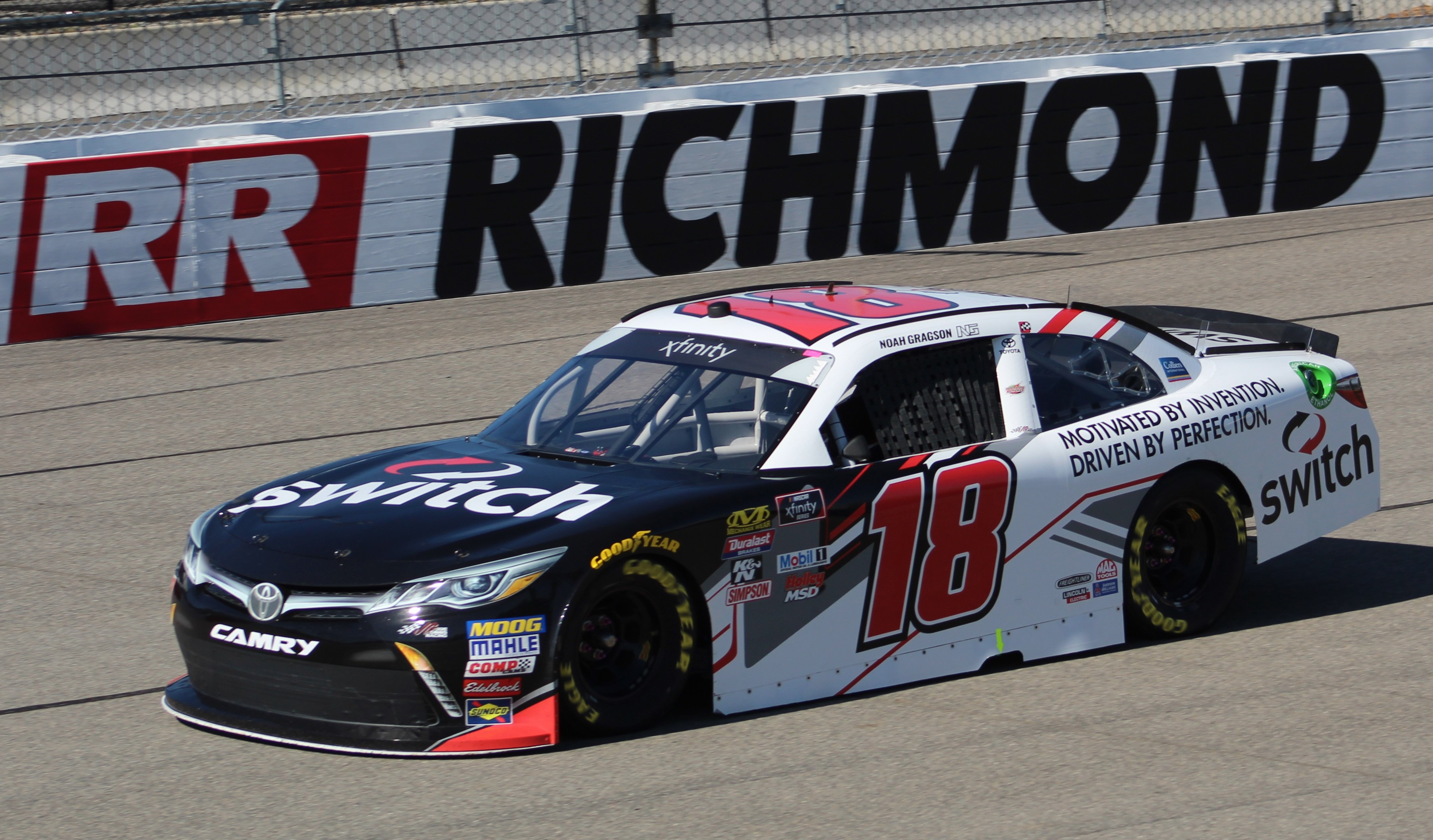
Gragson in his NASCAR Xfinity Series debut in the 2018 ToyotaCare 250

Gragson made his NASCAR Xfinity Series debut in the No. 18 for Joe Gibbs Racing at Richmond Raceway in 2018 as part of a three-race schedule that included further starts at Talladega Superspeedway and Dover International Speedway.

==== 2019–2022: JR Motorsports ====
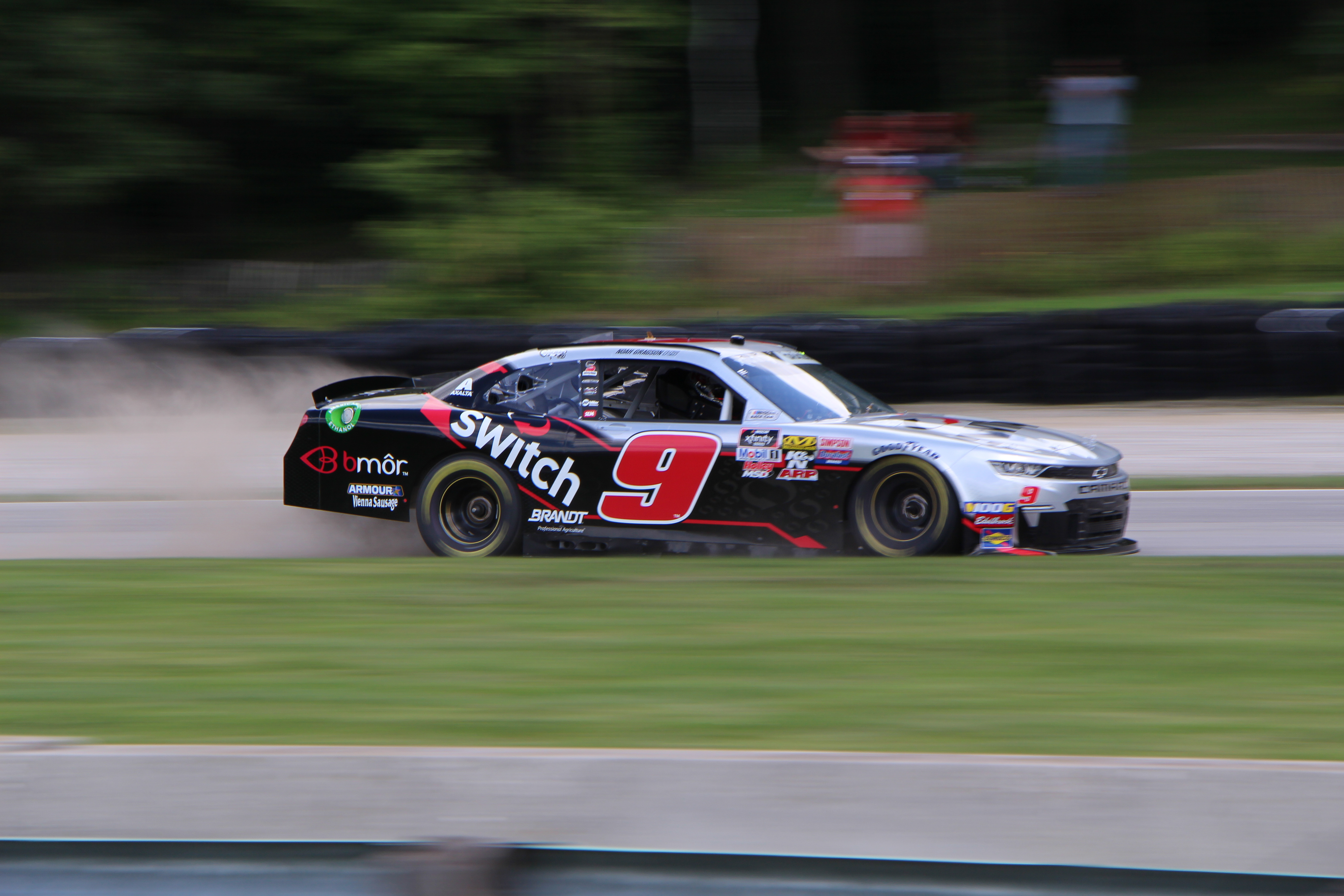
Gragson at the 2019 CTECH Manufacturing 180

On September 25, 2018, JR Motorsports announced that Gragson would drive the No. 1 Chevrolet full-time for the 2019 Xfinity Series, replacing Elliott Sadler, who retired at the end of the 2018 season. However, on January 25, the team announced that Gragson would instead pilot the No. 9 and teammate Michael Annett would drive the No. 1. Gragson opened his rookie campaign with JR Motorsports by finishing eleventh in the NASCAR Racing Experience 300 at Daytona International Speedway. He scored a ninth-place at Atlanta the next week for his first top-ten of the season and followed it up with his first top-five of the season the next week when he finished third at Las Vegas. Gragson would go on to produce several strong runs during the season including a season-best second-place at Michigan.

Gragson qualified for the Playoffs after the second Las Vegas race on the strength of seven top-fives and seventeen top-tens in the regular season. Gragson scored his first DNF of his Xfinity Series career in the 2019 O'Reilly 300 at Texas Motor Speedway when contact on lap 150 with the No. 18 of Harrison Burton sent Gragson's car spinning through the front stretch grass. Gragson was credited with a 30th-place finish.

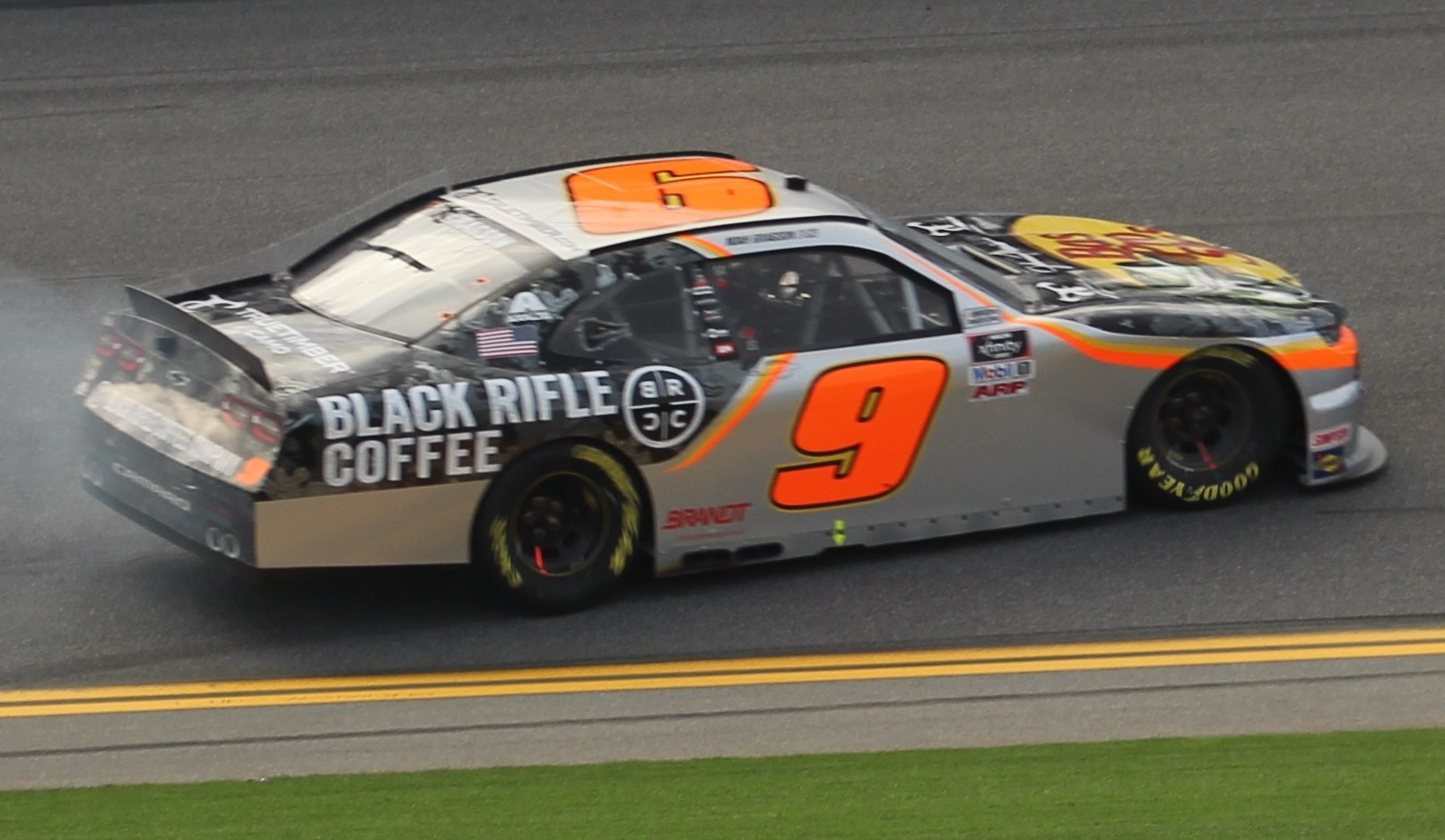
Gragson after winning the 2020 NASCAR Racing Experience 300

On February 11, 2020, Gragson announced Bass Pro Shops, Black Rifle Coffee Company, and True Timber would sponsor him as a primary sponsor for three races starting at the season opener at Daytona International Speedway. He went on to win the season-opening NASCAR Racing Experience 300. At the end of the 2020 Alsco 300, he was involved in a fight with Harrison Burton after Gragson pushed him into the wall in the closing laps. Neither driver was reprimanded by NASCAR. Gragson was in position to win a late-season race at Texas Motor Speedway but was passed by Harrison Burton in the final set of corners. He would later finish 5th for the year in points.

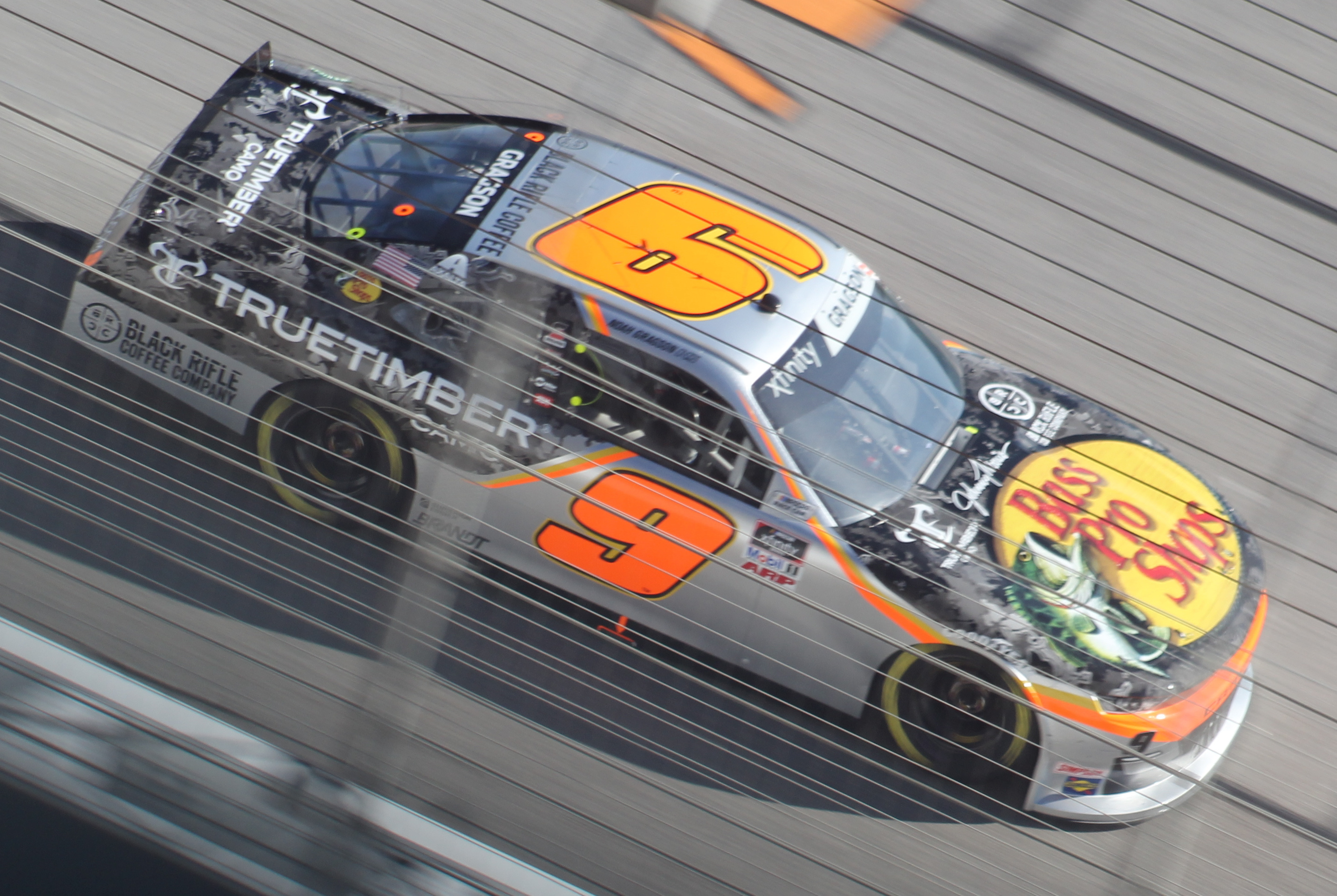
Gragson during the 2021 EchoPark 250

On August 27, 2020, Gragson and JR Motorsports confirmed a third season together. At the end of the Atlanta race, he was involved in a fight with Daniel Hemric after a pit road mishap during the race. Neither driver was reprimanded by NASCAR. Hemric would later go on to win the Xfinity Series championship that year. On May 10, Gragson finished fourth at Darlington, but was disqualified when his car failed post-race inspection for unapproved suspension mounts. JR Motorsports filed and won the appeal, restoring Gragson's fourth-place finish and awarding him the US$100,000 Dash 4 Cash bonus. He would later win at Darlington and Richmond to make the playoffs before scoring a big win in Martinsville to make the Championship for the first time in his career and finishing third in points.

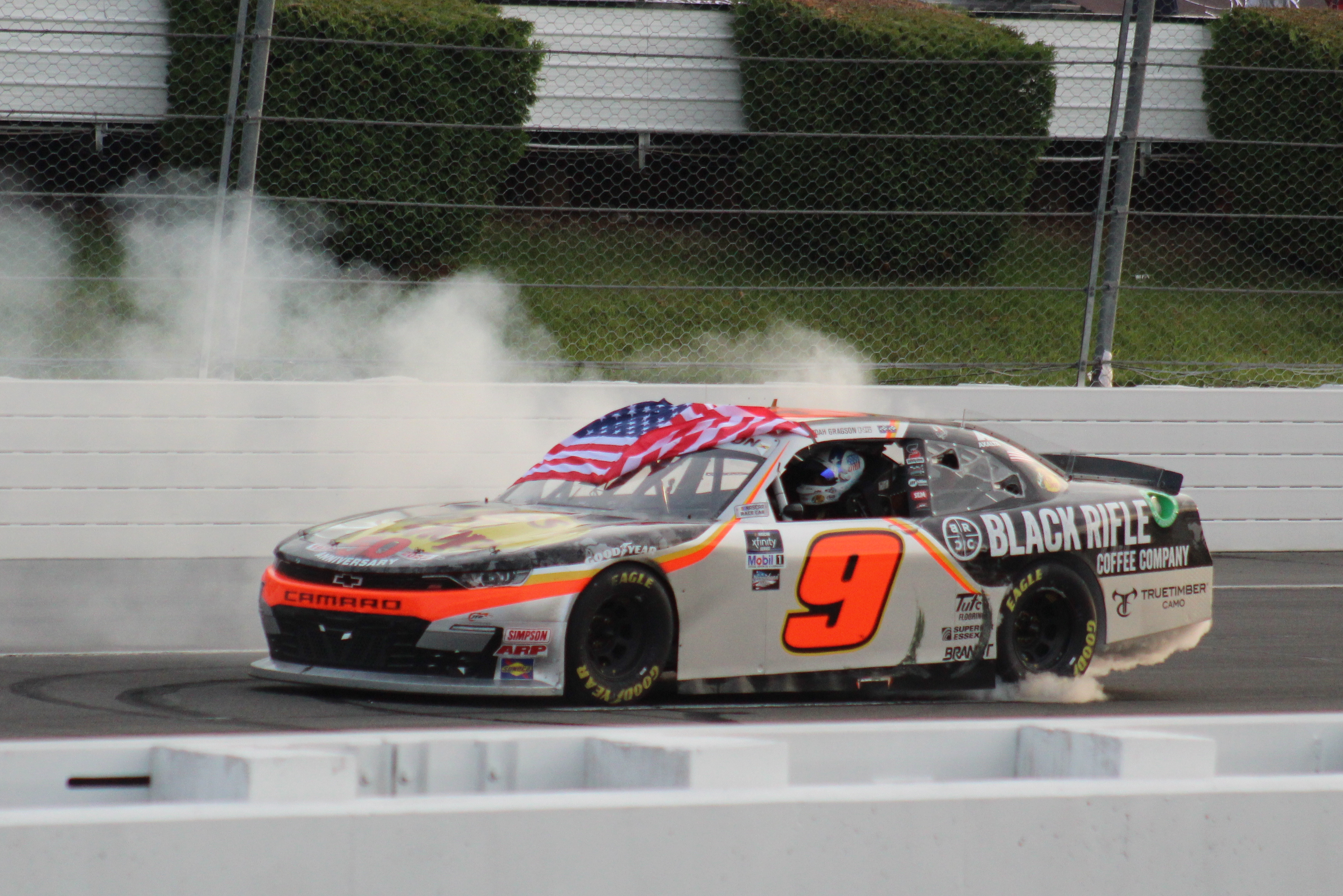
Noah Gragson after winning the 2022 Explore the Pocono Mountains 225

Gragson began the 2022 season with a third-place finish at Daytona. He also scored wins at Phoenix, Talladega and Pocono. At Road America, Gragson had an on-road scuffle with Sage Karam, resulting in him triggering a thirteen-car pileup on lap 25. He was fined US$35,000 and docked thirty driver and owner points for the incident. At the September Darlington race, Gragson won a three-car battle with Sheldon Creed and Kyle Larson on the closing laps. He also won the next three races at Kansas, Bristol, and Texas, becoming the first driver since Sam Ard in 1983 to win four straight Xfinity Series races. Gragson won his eighth race at Homestead to make his second straight Xfinity Championship 4 appearance. He would end up finishing second in the Championship to Ty Gibbs.

==== 2024: Part-time with Rette Jones Racing ====
On April 30, 2024, it was announced that Gragson would be returning to the Xfinity Series driving Rette Jones Racing's new No. 30 car in four races: Charlotte, Nashville, Michigan, and Darlington. It was the team's Xfinity Series debut. He drove for RJR in late models and the Canada Series in 2023 after he was reinstated by NASCAR. RJR would form an alliance with Stewart–Haas Racing, Gragson's Cup Series team, for their Xfinity Series program. In two races in 2024, Gragson finished in the top ten at Charlotte and in the top five at Nashville.

=== Cup Series ===
==== 2021–2022: Beard Motorsports, Kaulig Racing, and Hendrick Motorsports ====
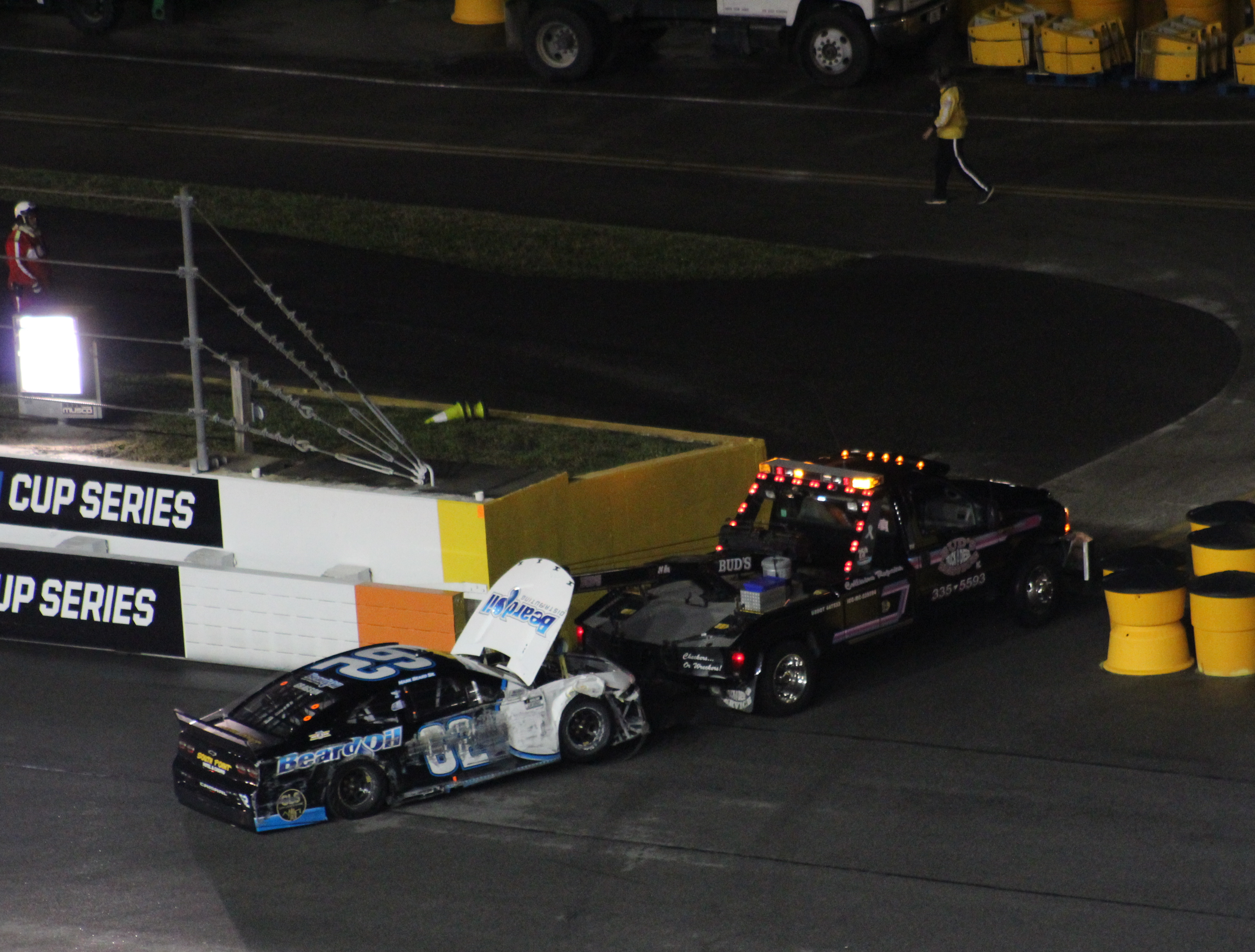
Gragson at Daytona International Speedway in 2021 after wrecking out of the 2nd Bluegreen Vacations Duel

On January 14, 2021, Beard Motorsports announced Gragson would attempt to make his NASCAR Cup Series debut in the Daytona 500, driving the No. 62 Chevrolet. He was unable to set a qualifying time after failing inspection three times and started the Bluegreen Vacations Duel from the back; a wreck with Garrett Smithley and Brad Keselowski with four laps remaining ended his chances of making the 500.

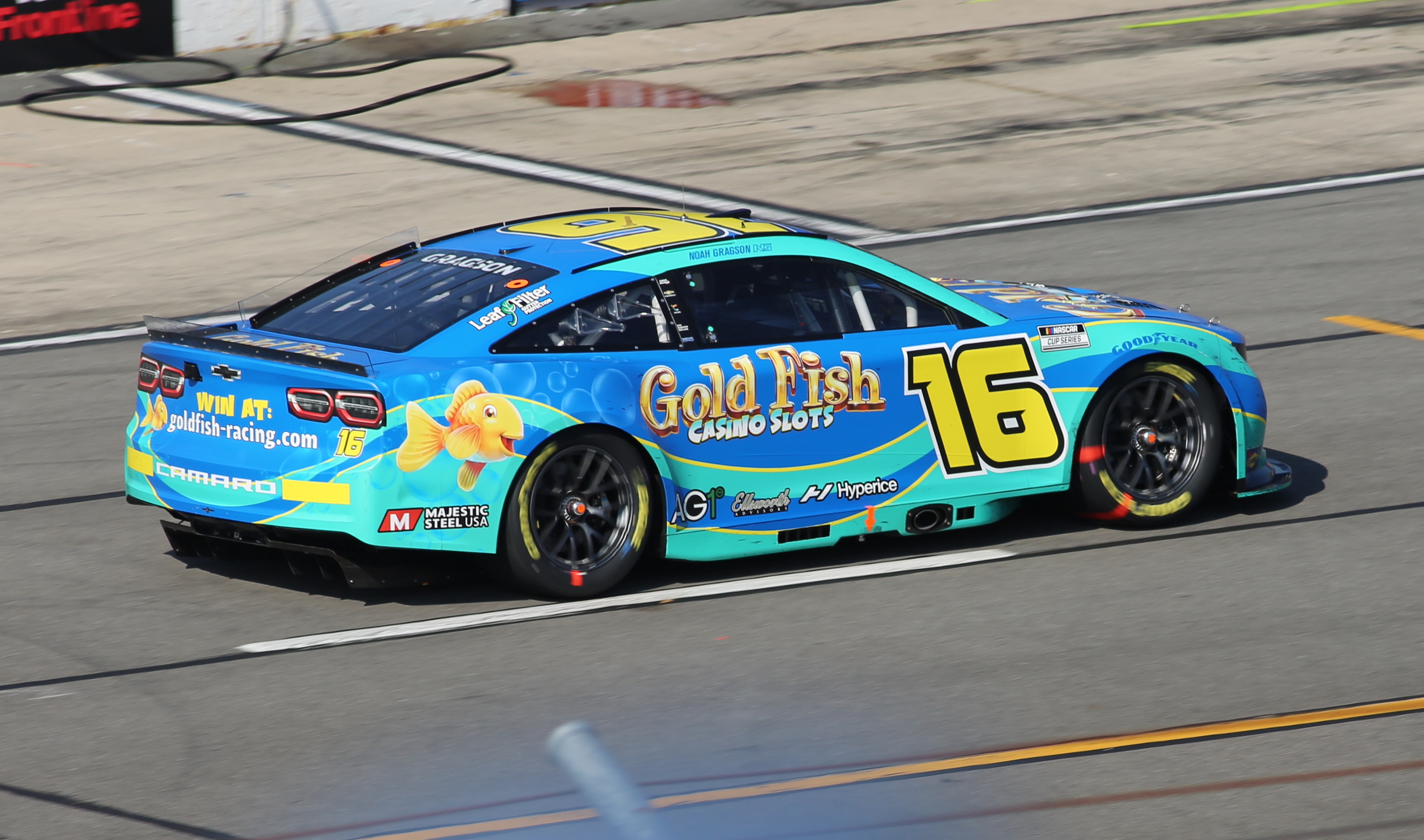
Gragson at Pocono Raceway during the 2022 M&M's Fan Appreciation 400

Gragson returned to Beard for the 2022 Daytona 500, this time successfully qualifying for the race. He also signed with Kaulig Racing to share the No. 16 Cup car with A. J. Allmendinger and former rival Daniel Hemric.

In his first start at the Daytona 500, Gragson was involved in The Big One late in the race with ten laps to go while running seventh after getting wrecked by Kevin Harvick. In his second start at Atlanta, he would have much of the same luck, wrecking hard into the second turn wall on lap 24 while running seventeenth after his car broke loose in the middle of turns 1 and 2. At the 2022 Coke Zero Sugar 400, Gragson finished a Cup career-best finish of fifth.

Gragson drove the Hendrick Motorsports No. 48 at the Talladega, Charlotte Roval, Las Vegas, Homestead and the Martinsville races as a substitute for Alex Bowman, who sustained a concussion from a crash at Texas.

==== 2023: Rookie season with Legacy Motor Club and suspension ====
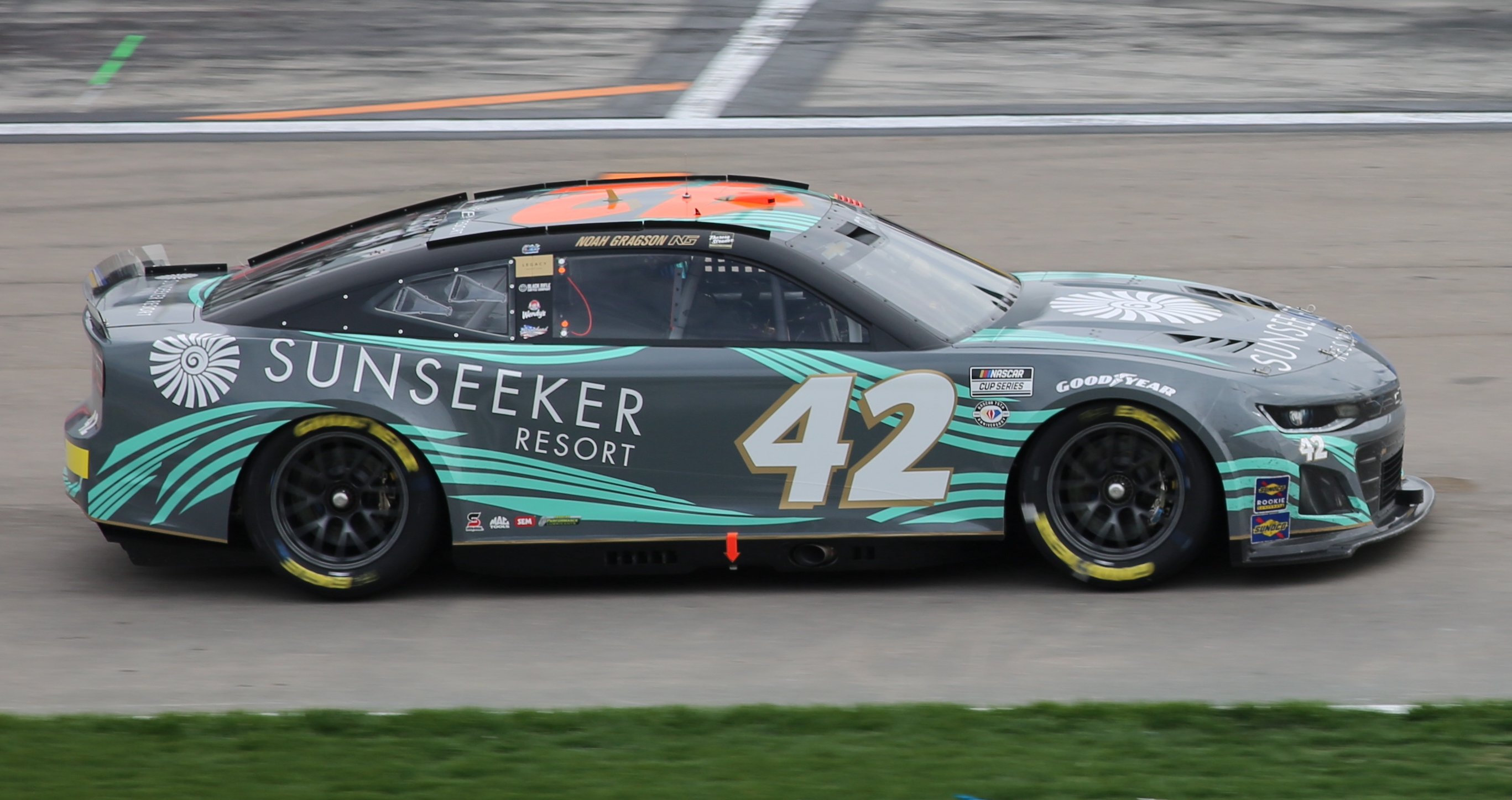
Gragson at Las Vegas Motor Speedway during the 2023 Pennzoil 400

On August 10, 2022, Gragson was announced as the driver for the No. 42 for Petty GMS (which was later rebranded Legacy Motor Club) for 2023, replacing Ty Dillon and signing a two-year contract. He started the season with a 24th-place finish at the 2023 Daytona 500. At Kansas, Gragson got into a fist fight with Ross Chastain after the two were having a discussion of an on track incident that escalated quickly. At Gateway, Gragson was involved in a hard crash due to a brake rotor failure. His car spun down toward the apron and then back up the track, hitting the wall first with the rear of his car and then the front. Gragson suffered concussion-like symptoms from the crash and was replaced by Grant Enfinger at Sonoma. On August 5, NASCAR and LMC suspended Gragson indefinitely for violation of Section 4.4.D. of the NASCAR Rule Book, which concerns member conduct, after Gragson liked an offensive meme related to the murder of George Floyd, which depicted him as Sebastian the Crab from Disney's The Little Mermaid, with the quote "Under Da Knee" on social media. On August 10, 2023, Gragson requested to be released from his contract with LMC so he could focus on the reinstatement process. On September 12, 2023, NASCAR lifted Gragson's suspension and cleared him to resume his racing activity after he completed diversity and inclusion training.

==== 2024: Stewart–Haas Racing ====
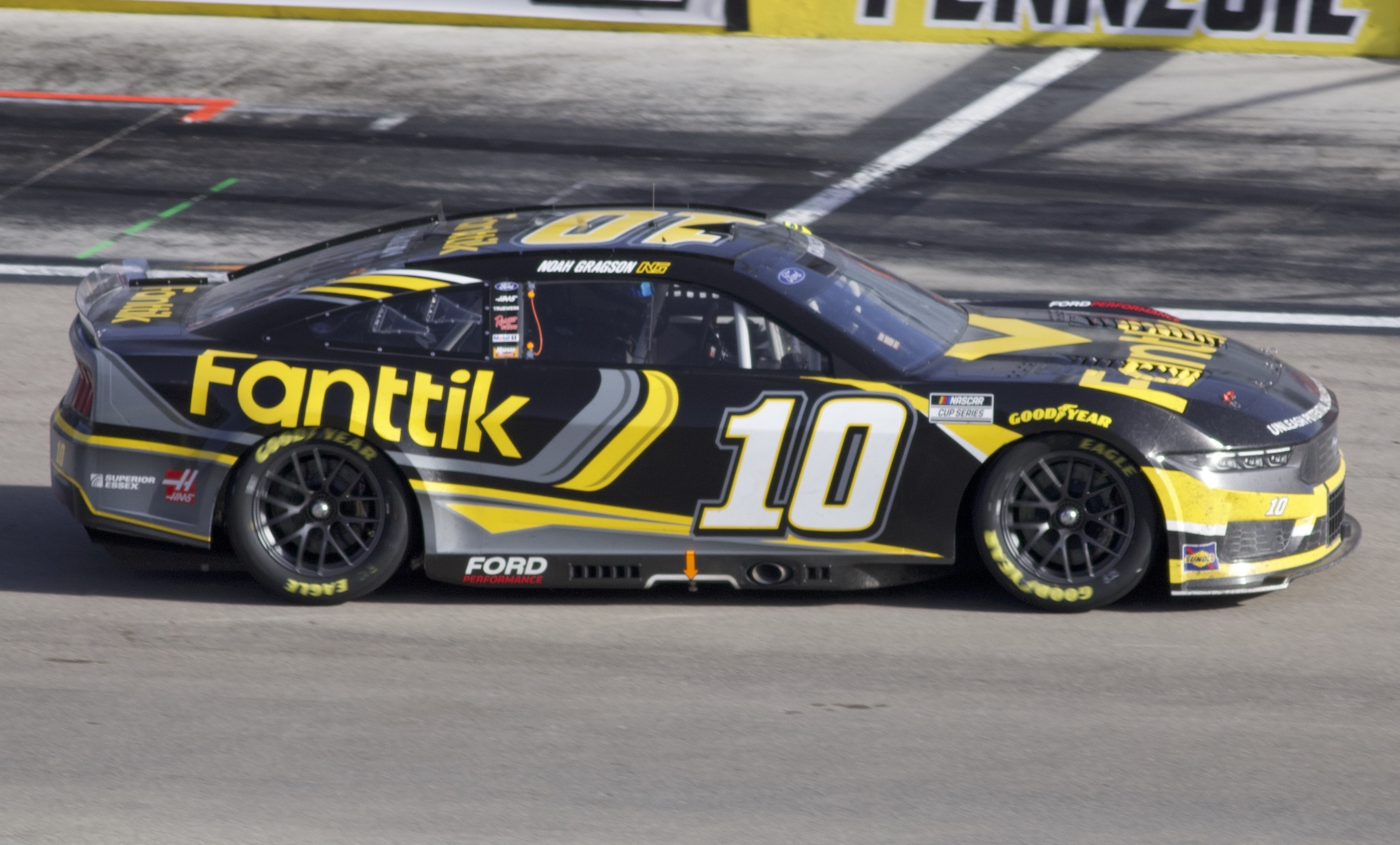
Gragson's No. 10 car at Las Vegas Motor Speedway in 2024

On December 13, 2023, Gragson signed a multi-year deal with Stewart–Haas Racing to drive the No. 10, starting in 2024.

Gragson started the season with a ninth-place finish at the 2024 Daytona 500. Following the Atlanta race, the No. 10 was hit with an L1 penalty and docked 35 owner and driver points after pre-race inspection revealed unapproved roof rails. Gragson rebounded a week later at Las Vegas with a sixth-place finish. He scored a career-best third-place finish at Talladega.

On May 28, 2024, Stewart–Haas Racing announced it would shut down its NASCAR operations at the end of the season.

==== 2025: Front Row Motorsports ====
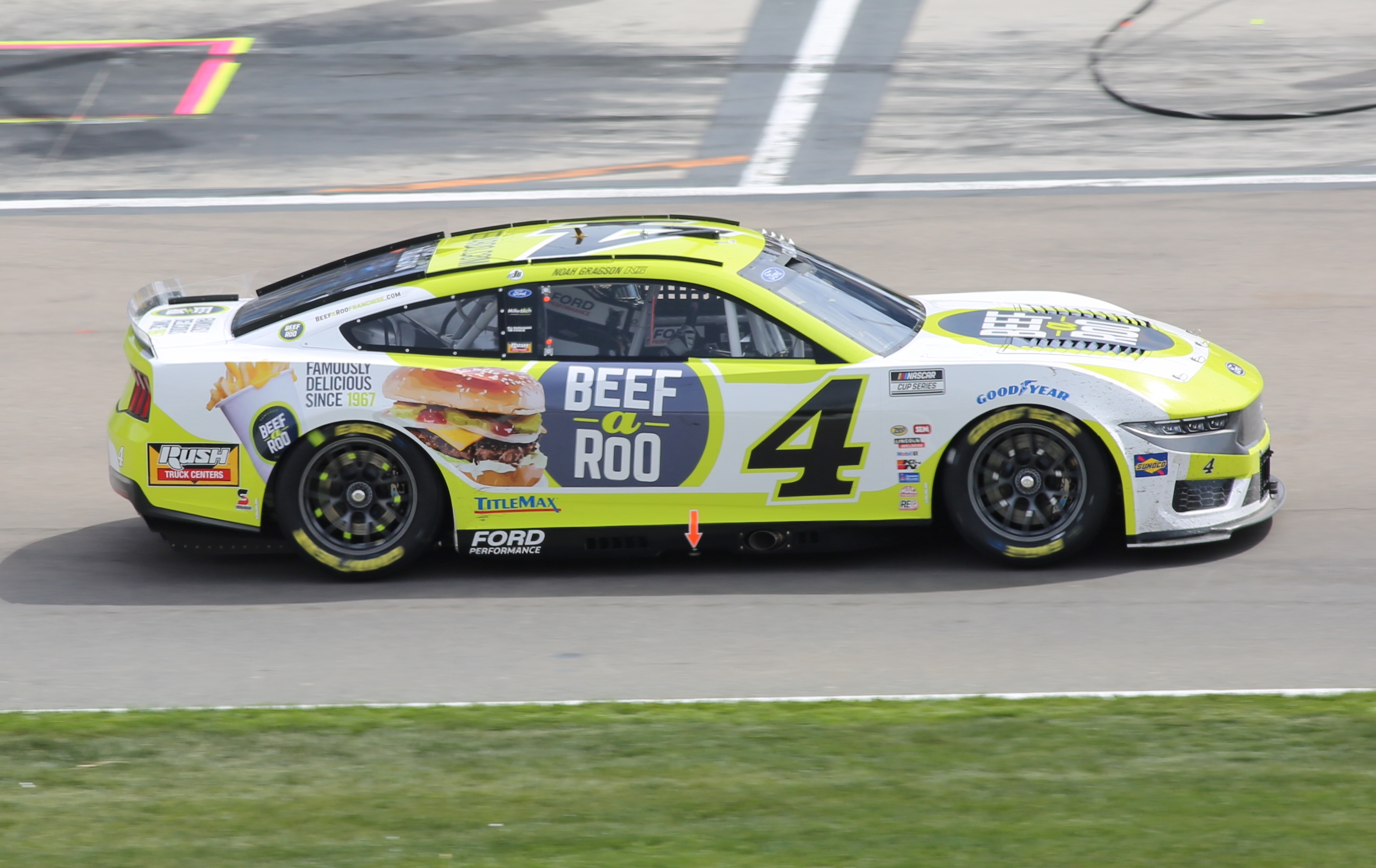
Gragson's No. 4 car at Las Vegas Motor Speedway in 2025

On July 10, 2024, Gragson signed a multi-year deal with Front Row Motorsports to drive for the team starting in 2025. On January 3, 2025, FRM announced Gragson will drive the No. 4 car. He started the 2025 season with a 28th-place finish at the 2025 Daytona 500. He finished in fourth place at Talladega in the Spring.

==== 2026 ====
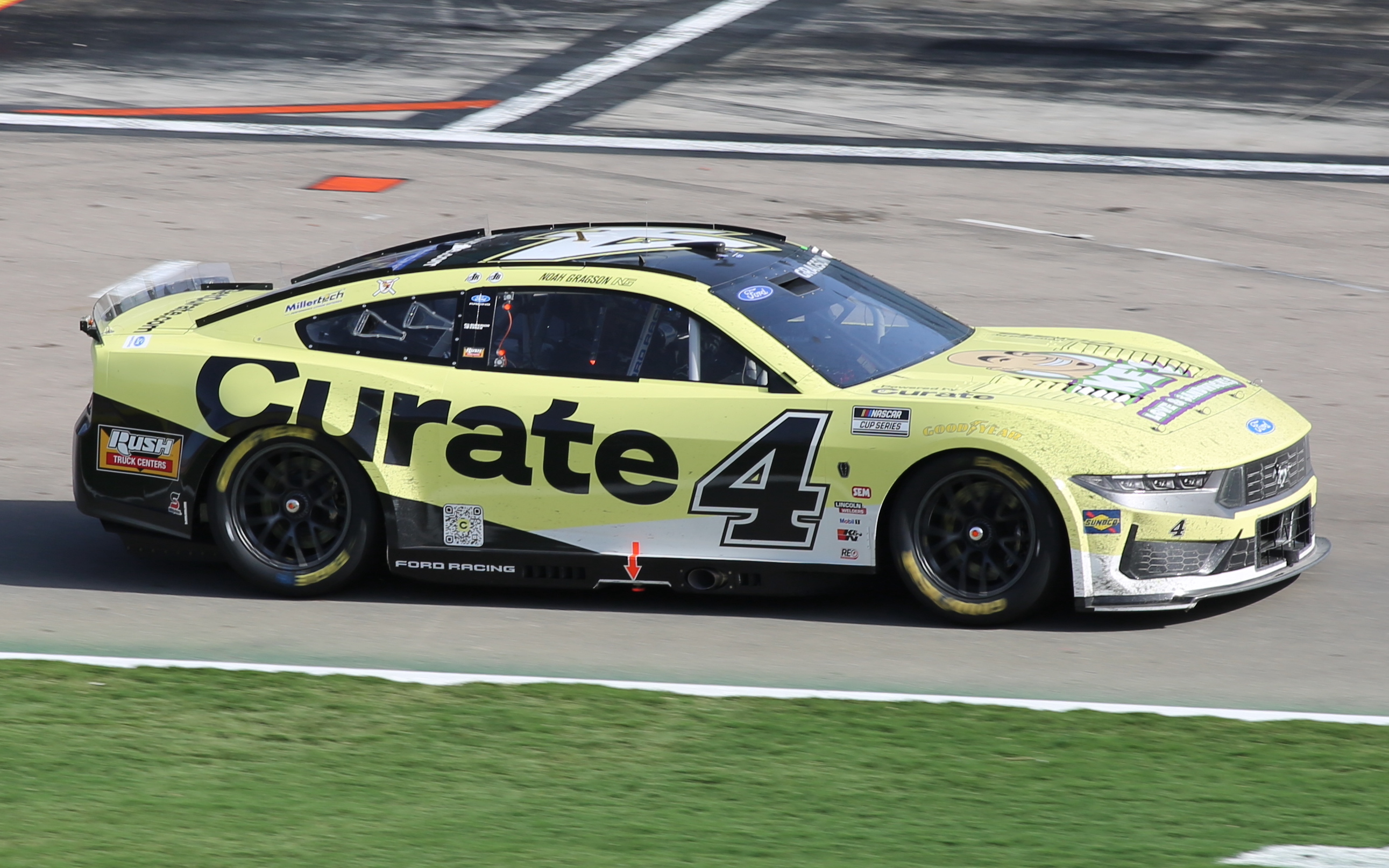
Gragson's No. 4 car at Las Vegas Motor Speedway in 2026

He remained with the team in 2026. He started the 2026 season with an 11th-place finish at the 2026 Daytona 500. He scored a 9th-place finish at the Spring Talladega race.

==== 2027: Contract extension ====
On August 14, 2026, it was announced that Gragson signed a contract extension to remain at FRM for 2027.

=== Other racing ===
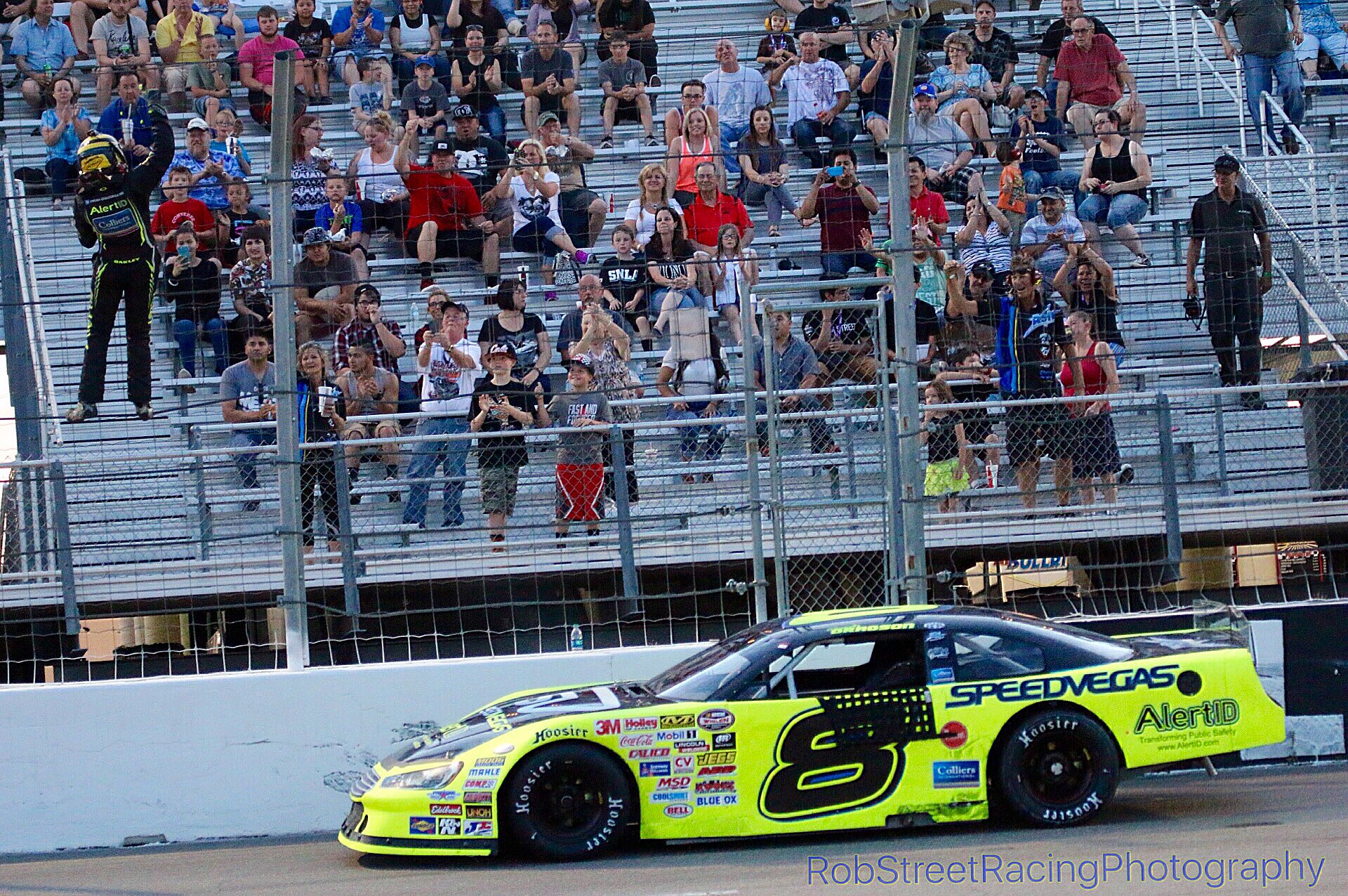
Gragson after winning at the Las Vegas Bullring in 2016

==== Late Model Racing ====
In 2017, Gragson won the Winchester 400 and in his final ride with KBM, he won the 2018 Snowball Derby after holding off Ty Majeski.

Gragson ran late model races in 2023 for Rette Jones Racing after being reinstated from his suspension by NASCAR.

==== NASCAR Canada Series ====
Gragson's 2018 racing slate also included starts on the NASCAR Pinty's Series circuit in an effort to make himself a better driver via more seat time. He also started working with a sports psychologist that year.

Gragson ran one race in the Pinty's Series in 2023 for Rette Jones Racing after being reinstated from his suspension by NASCAR.

== Personal life ==
Gragson's great-grandfather, Oran K. Gragson, was the longest-serving mayor of Las Vegas, Nevada, having held the office from 1959 to 1975. Gragson's grandfather and father were both prominent real estate developers in Las Vegas.

Gragson struggled in school due to dyslexia and a learning disability. In seventh grade, he was sent to attend the Army and Navy Academy in Carlsbad, California, for two years. Gragson attended Bishop Gorman High School in Las Vegas, Nevada for two years. He finished his high school education online at K12. Gragson enjoys downhill mountain biking, and is an avid video game player, saying in an interview that he would perhaps spend Dash 4 Cash winnings on the popular video game Fortnite.

== Motorsports career results ==
=== Stock car career summary ===
Season	Series	Team	Races	Wins	Top 5	Top 10	Points	Position
2015	NASCAR K&N Pro Series East	Jefferson Pitts Racing	2	0	0	2	70	35th
2015	NASCAR K&N Pro Series West	Jefferson Pitts Racing	13	2	7	11	504	**2nd**
2015	ARCA Racing Series	Mason Mitchell Motorsports	1	0	0	0	160	105th
2016	NASCAR Camping World Truck Series	Wauters Motorsports	2	0	0	0	35	40th
2016	NASCAR K&N Pro Series East	Jefferson Pitts Racing	13	2	4	6	454	5th
2016	NASCAR K&N Pro Series West	Jefferson Pitts Racing	14	2	8	12	552	**3rd**
2016	ARCA Racing Series	Mason Mitchell Motorsports	1	0	0	0	285	77th
2016	ARCA Racing Series	Venturini Motorsports	1	0	1	1	285	77th
2017	NASCAR Camping World Truck Series	Kyle Busch Motorsports	23	1	4	13	724	10th
2017	ARCA Racing Series	Venturini Motorsports	5	0	1	2	685	34th
2018	NASCAR Xfinity Series	Joe Gibbs Racing	3	0	2	3	0	NC†
2018	NASCAR Camping World Truck Series	Kyle Busch Motorsports	22	1	8	17	4034	**2nd**
2018	NASCAR K&N Pro Series East	DGR-Crosley	2	0	1	1	67	31st
2018	ARCA Racing Series	DGR-Crosley	2	0	0	2	385	56th
2018	NASCAR Pinty's Series	DJK Racing	1	0	1	1	41	35th
2019	NASCAR Xfinity Series	JR Motorsports	33	0	9	22	2246	8th
2019	NASCAR K&N Pro Series West	Jefferson Pitts Racing	1	1	1	1	0	NC†
2020	NASCAR Xfinity Series	JR Motorsports	33	2	17	25	2306	5th
2021	NASCAR Cup Series	Beard Motorsports	0	0	0	0	0	NC†
2021	NASCAR Xfinity Series	JR Motorsports	33	3	13	20	4025	**3rd**
2022	NASCAR Cup Series	Beard Motorsports	3	0	1	1	0	NC†
2022	NASCAR Cup Series	Kaulig Racing	10	0	0	0	0	NC†
2022	NASCAR Cup Series	Hendrick Motorsports	5	0	0	0	0	NC†
2022	NASCAR Xfinity Series	JR Motorsports	33	8	21	26	4035	**2nd**
2023	NASCAR Cup Series	Legacy Motor Club	21	0	0	0	199	33rd
2023	NASCAR Pinty's Series	Kasey Jones Racing	1	0	0	1	34	48th
2024	NASCAR Cup Series	Stewart–Haas Racing	36	0	1	7	612	24th
2024	NASCAR Xfinity Series	Rette Jones Racing	4	0	1	3	0	NC†
2024	ARCA Menards Series West	Rette Jones Racing	1	0	0	0	29	62nd
2025	NASCAR Cup Series	Front Row Motorsports	36	0	1	3	440	34th
2026	NASCAR Cup Series	Front Row Motorsports	36	0	0	3	486	31st

^{†} As Gragson was a guest driver, he was ineligible for championship points.

=== NASCAR ===
(key) (Bold – Pole position awarded by qualifying time. Italics – Pole position earned by points standings or practice time. * – Most laps led.)

==== Cup Series ====
NASCAR Cup Series results
Year	Team	No.	Make	1	2	3	4	5	6	7	8	9	10	11	12	13	14	15	16	17	18	19	20	21	22	23	24	25	26	27	28	29	30	31	32	33	34	35	36	NCSC	Pts	Ref
2021	Beard Motorsports	62	Chevy	DAY; DNQ	DRC	HOM	LVS	PHO	ATL	BRD	MAR	RCH	TAL	KAN	DAR	DOV	COA	CLT	SON	NSH	POC	POC	ROA	ATL	NHA	GLN	IRC	MCH	DAY	DAR	RCH	BRI	LVS	TAL	ROV	TEX	KAN	MAR	PHO	69th	0^{1}	
2022	Beard Motorsports	62	Chevy	DAY; 31	CAL	LVS	PHO						TAL; 20	DOV	DAR														DAY; 5	DAR										44th	0^{1}	
2022	Kaulig Racing	16	Chevy					ATL; 37	COA	RCH	MAR	BRD; 27				KAN; 18	CLT; 24	GTW	SON	NSH	ROA	ATL; 34	NHA	POC; 24	IRC	MCH; 30	RCH; 24	GLN			KAN; 18	BRI	TEX; 21							44th	0^{1}	
2022	Hendrick Motorsports	48	Chevy																															TAL; 19	ROV; 23	LVS; 11	HOM; 25	MAR; 25	PHO	44th	0^{1}	
2023	Legacy Motor Club	42	Chevy	DAY; 24	CAL; 22	LVS; 30	PHO; 29	ATL; 12	COA; 20	RCH; 37	BRD; 33	MAR; 30	TAL; 32	DOV; 34	KAN; 29	DAR; 26	CLT; 36	GTW; 33	SON	NSH; 26	CSC; 25	ATL; 33	NHA; 32	POC; 22	RCH; 28	MCH	IRC	GLN	DAY	DAR	KAN	BRI	TEX	TAL	ROV	LVS	HOM	MAR	PHO	33rd	199	
2024	Stewart–Haas Racing	10	Ford	DAY; 9	ATL; 36	LVS; 6	PHO; 12	BRI; 34	COA; 34	RCH; 12	MAR; 20	TEX; 18	TAL; 3	DOV; 6	KAN; 9	DAR; 14	CLT; 38	GTW; 22	SON; 26	IOW; 16	NHA; 27	NSH; 10	CSC; 14	POC; 37	IND; 9	RCH; 20	MCH; 12	DAY; 37	DAR; 32	ATL; 34	GLN; 11	BRI; 12	KAN; 18	TAL; 25	ROV; 31	LVS; 18	HOM; 19	MAR; 11	PHO; 12	24th	612	
2025	Front Row Motorsports	4	Ford	DAY; 28	ATL; 34	COA; 8	PHO; 26	LVS; 31	HOM; 16	MAR; 29	DAR; 19	BRI; 23	TAL; 4	TEX; 34	KAN; 14	CLT; 10	NSH; 38	MCH; 27	MXC; 30	POC; 23	ATL; 25	CSC; 30	SON; 37	DOV; 31	IND; 33	IOW; 29	GLN; 21	RCH; 27	DAY; 38	DAR; 14	GTW; 30	BRI; 23	NHA; 16	KAN; 23	ROV; 28	LVS; 13	TAL; 36	MAR; 30	PHO; 27	34th	440	
2026	Front Row Motorsports	4	Ford	DAY; 11	ATL; 14	COA; 22	PHO; 36	LVS; 30	DAR; 26	MAR; 28	BRI; 26	KAN; 28	TAL; 9	TEX; 28	GLN; 22	CLT; 24	NSH; 16	MCH; 27	POC; 35	COR; 35	SON; 32	CHI; 27	ATL; 27	NWS; 25	IND; 22	IOW; 17	RCH; 18	NHA; 10	DAY; 26	DAR; 32	GTW; 33	BRI; 16	KAN; 36	LVS; 20	CLT; 25	PHO; 13	TAL; 20	MAR; 26	HOM; 9	31st	486	

===== Daytona 500 =====
Year	Team	Manufacturer	Start	Finish
2021	Beard Motorsports	Chevrolet	DNQ	
2022	Beard Motorsports	Chevrolet	39	31
2023	Legacy Motor Club	Chevrolet	22	24
2024	Stewart–Haas Racing	Ford	38	9
2025	Front Row Motorsports	Ford	32	28
2026	Front Row Motorsports	Ford	25	11

==== Xfinity Series ====
NASCAR Xfinity Series results
Year	Team	No.	Make	1	2	3	4	5	6	7	8	9	10	11	12	13	14	15	16	17	18	19	20	21	22	23	24	25	26	27	28	29	30	31	32	33	NXSC	Pts	Ref
2018	Joe Gibbs Racing	18	Toyota	DAY	ATL	LVS	PHO	CAL	TEX	BRI	RCH; 2	TAL; 4	DOV; 7	CLT	POC	MCH	IOW	CHI	DAY	KEN	NHA	IOW	GLN	MOH	BRI	ROA	DAR	IND	LVS	RCH	ROV	DOV	KAN	TEX	PHO	HOM	89th	0^{1}	
2019	JR Motorsports	9	Chevy	DAY; 11	ATL; 9	LVS; 3	PHO; 11	CAL; 12	TEX; 13	BRI; 9	RCH; 22	TAL; 11	DOV; 19	CLT; 4	POC; 6	MCH; 2	IOW; 6	CHI; 6	DAY; 15	KEN; 6	NHA; 10	IOW; 4	GLN; 9	MOH; 5	BRI; 17	ROA; 4	DAR; 8	IND; 3	LVS; 6	RCH; 7	ROV; 5	DOV; 7	KAN; 13	TEX; 30	PHO; 10	HOM; 4	8th	2246	
2020	JR Motorsports	9	Chevy	DAY; 1	LVS; 4	CAL; 26	PHO; 7	DAR; 5*	CLT; 11	BRI; 1	ATL; 2	HOM; 3*	HOM; 5*	TAL; 10	POC; 22	IRC; 3	KEN; 11*	KEN; 7	TEX; 30	KAN; 15	ROA; 6	DRC; 3	DOV; 4	DOV; 6	DAY; 31	DAR; 7	RCH; 8	RCH; 5	BRI; 7	LVS; 2	TAL; 3	ROV; 2	KAN; 36	TEX; 2*	MAR; 3	PHO; 2	5th	2306	
2021	JR Motorsports	9	Chevy	DAY; 32	DRC; 28	HOM; 33	LVS; 5	PHO; 39	ATL; 4	MAR; 2	TAL; 6	DAR; 4*	DOV; 15	COA; 36	CLT; 27	MOH; 40	TEX; 7	NSH; 8	POC; 4	ROA; 9	ATL; 3	NHA; 14	GLN; 7	IRC; 5	MCH; 3	DAY; 7	DAR; 1	RCH; 1	BRI; 12	LVS; 3	TAL; 30	ROV; 6	TEX; 3	KAN; 35	MAR; 1*	PHO; 12	3rd	4025	
2022	JR Motorsports	9	Chevy	DAY; 3	CAL; 2	LVS; 2	PHO; 1*	ATL; 26	COA; 4	RCH; 21	MAR; 20	TAL; 1	DOV; 4	DAR; 2	**TEX**; 36	CLT; 4	PIR; 9	NSH; 13	ROA; 8	ATL; 6	NHA; 38	POC; 1*	IRC; 10	**MCH**; 3	GLN; 4	DAY; 22*	DAR; 1*	KAN; 1	BRI; 1	TEX; 1*	TAL; 10	ROV; 3	LVS; 2*	HOM; 1*	MAR; 4	PHO; 2	2nd	4035	
2024	Rette Jones Racing	30	Ford	DAY	ATL	LVS	PHO	COA	RCH	MAR	TEX	TAL	DOV	DAR	CLT; 10	PIR	SON	IOW	NHA	NSH; 5	CSC	POC	IND	MCH; 6	DAY	DAR; 15	ATL	GLN	BRI	KAN	TAL	ROV	LVS	HOM	MAR	PHO	85th	0^{1}	

==== Camping World Truck Series ====
NASCAR Camping World Truck Series results
Year	Team	No.	Make	1	2	3	4	5	6	7	8	9	10	11	12	13	14	15	16	17	18	19	20	21	22	23	NCWTC	Pts	Ref
2016	Wauters Motorsports	18	Toyota	DAY	ATL	MAR	KAN	DOV	CLT	TEX	IOW	GTW	KEN	ELD	POC	BRI	MCH	MSP	CHI	NHA	LVS	TAL	MAR	TEX	PHO; 16	HOM; 15	40th	35	
2017	Kyle Busch Motorsports	18	Toyota	DAY; 26	ATL; 15	MAR; 4	KAN; 28	CLT; 9	DOV; 9	**TEX**; 7	GTW; 9	**IOW**; 6	KEN; 5	ELD; 7	POC; 24	MCH; 7	BRI; 15	MSP; 2	CHI; 8	**NHA**; 15	LVS; 13	TAL; 14	MAR; 1	TEX; 10	PHO; 15	HOM; 18	10th	724	
2018	Kyle Busch Motorsports	18	Toyota	DAY; 23	ATL; 2	LVS; 12	MAR; 5	**DOV**; 20	**KAN**; 1*	CLT; 8	TEX; 10	IOW; 2	GTW; 10*	**CHI**; 4	**KEN**; 8*	ELD; 6	POC; INQ^{†}	MCH; 4*	BRI; 9	MSP; 9*	**LVS**; 18	TAL; 13	MAR; 7	TEX; 10	**PHO**; 2	HOM; 3	2nd	4034	
^{†} – Qualified but replaced by Erik Jones due to illness

^{*} Season still in progress
^{1} Ineligible for series points

==== Pinty's Series ====
NASCAR Pinty's Series results
Year	Team	No.	Make	1	2	3	4	5	6	7	8	9	10	11	12	13	14	NPSC	Pts	Ref
2018	DJK Racing	28	Dodge	MSP; 3	HAM	ACD	TOR	SAS	SAS	EIR	CTR	RIS	MSP	ASE	NHA	JUK		35th	41	
2023	Kasey Jones Racing	30	Dodge	SUN	MSP	ACD	AVE	TOR	EDM	SAS	SAS	CTR	OSK	OSK	ICAR	MSP	DEL; 10	48th	34	

=== ARCA Racing Series ===
(key) (Bold – Pole position awarded by qualifying time. Italics – Pole position earned by points standings or practice time. * – Most laps led.)

ARCA Racing Series results
Year	Team	No.	Make	1	2	3	4	5	6	7	8	9	10	11	12	13	14	15	16	17	18	19	20	ARSC	Pts	Ref
2015	Mason Mitchell Motorsports	78	Ford	DAY	MOB	NSH	SLM	TAL	TOL	NJE	POC	MCH	CHI	WIN	IOW	IRP	POC	BLN	ISF	DSF	SLM	KAN	KEN; 14	105th	160	
2016	Mason Mitchell Motorsports	78	Chevy	DAY	NSH	SLM	TAL	TOL	NJE	POC; 30	MCH	MAD	WIN	IOW	IRP	POC	BLN	ISF	DSF	SLM	CHI	KEN		77th	285	
2016	Venturini Motorsports	15	Toyota																				KAN; 5	77th	285	
2017	Venturini Motorsports	55	Toyota	DAY; 26	NSH	SLM	TAL; 30	TOL	ELK	POC	MCH	MAD	IOW	IRP										34th	685	
2017	Venturini Motorsports	15	Toyota												POC; 9	WIN	ISF	ROA; 25	DSF	SLM	CHI; 4	KEN	KAN	34th	685	
2018	DGR-Crosley	54	Toyota	DAY; 7	NSH	SLM	TAL	TOL	CLT	**POC**; 10	MCH	MAD	GTW	CHI	IOW	ELK	POC	ISF	BLN	DSF	SLM	IRP	KAN	56th	385	

==== K&N Pro Series East ====
NASCAR K&N Pro Series East results
Year	Team	No.	Make	1	2	3	4	5	6	7	8	9	10	11	12	13	14	NKNPSEC	Pts	Ref
2015	Jefferson Pitts Racing	7	Ford	NSM	GRE	BRI	IOW	BGS	LGY	COL	NHA	IOW	GLN; 8	MOT	VIR			35th	70	
2015	Jefferson Pitts Racing	55	Ford													RCH; 10	DOV	35th	70	
2016	Jefferson Pitts Racing	55	Ford	NSM; 6	MOB; 12	GRE; 7	BRI; 12	VIR; 17	DOM; 3			NHA; 11	IOW				DOV; 24	5th	454	
2016	Jefferson Pitts Racing	7	Ford							STA; 1	COL; 5			GLN; 15	GRE; 13	NJM; 1		5th	454	
2018	DGR-Crosley	54	Toyota	NSM	**BRI**; 3	LGY	SBO	SBO	MEM	NJM	TMP	NHA	IOW					31st	67	
2018	DGR-Crosley	98	Toyota											GLN; 20	GTW	NHA	DOV	31st	67	

==== ARCA Menards Series West ====
ARCA Menards Series West results
Year	Team	No.	Make	1	2	3	4	5	6	7	8	9	10	11	12	13	14	AMSWC	Pts	Ref
2015	Jefferson Pitts Racing	7	Ford	KCR; 3	IRW; 7	TUS; 1	IOW; 3	SHA; 16	SON; 7	SLS; 2	IOW; 2	EVG; 5	CNS; 8	**MER**; 1*	AAS; 8	PHO; 14		2nd	504	
2016	Jefferson Pitts Racing	7	Ford	IRW; 4	KCR; 8	TUS; 9	OSS; 3	CNS; 10	SON; 2*	SLS; 2	IOW; 6	EVG; 16	DCS; 4	MMP; 1	MMP; 1	MER; 6	AAS; 4	3rd	552	
2019	Jefferson Pitts Racing	7	Chevy	LVS	IRW	TUS	TUS	CNS	SON; 1	DCS	IOW	EVG	GTW	MER	AAS	KCR	PHO	35th	47	
2024	Rette Jones Racing	30	Ford	PHO	KER	PIR	SON; 16	IRW	IRW	SHA	TRI	MAD	AAS	KER	PHO			62nd	29	

=== CARS Super Late Model Tour ===
(key) (Bold – Pole position awarded by qualifying time. Italics – Pole position earned by points standings or practice time. * – Most laps led. ** – All laps led.)

CARS Super Late Model Tour results
Year	Team	No.	Make	1	2	3	4	5	6	7	8	9	10	11	12	13	CSLMTC	Pts	Ref
2017	Kyle Busch Motorsports	51	Toyota	CNC	DOM	DOM	HCY	HCY	**BRI**; 30	AND	ROU	TCM	ROU	HCY	CNC	SBO	N/A	0	
2018	Kyle Busch Motorsports	18	Toyota	MYB	NSH; 4	ROU	HCY	BRI	AND	HCY	ROU	SBO					N/A	0	

=== ASA STARS National Tour ===
(key) (Bold – Pole position awarded by qualifying time. Italics – Pole position earned by points standings or practice time. * – Most laps led. ** – All laps led.)

ASA STARS National Tour results
Year	Team	No.	Make	1	2	3	4	5	6	7	8	9	10	11	12	ASNTC	Pts	Ref
2023	Rette Jones Racing	30	Chevy	FIF	MAD	NWS; 30	HCY	MLW	AND	WIR		WIN; 15	NSV			32nd	119	
2023	Rette Jones Racing	30	Ford								TOL; 11					32nd	119	
2025	Rette Jones Racing	30G	Ford	NSM	FIF	DOM	HCY	NPS	MAD	SLG	AND	OWO; DSQ	TOL	WIN	NSV	68th	29	

Sporting positions
Preceded by Kyle Busch	Snowball Derby Winner; 2018	Succeeded by Travis Braden
Preceded by Travis Braden	Winchester 400 Winner; 2017	Succeeded by Jeff Choquette
