= Jack Choquette =

American racing driver

- Born: December 28, 1928; Montclair, New Jersey, U.S.
- Died: February 23, 2013 (aged 84); Loxahatchee, Florida, U.S.
- Achievements: 1954 NASCAR Modified Champion

NASCAR Cup Series career
- 6 races run over 2 years
- Best finish: 54th (1955)
- First race: 1955 Race #2 (West Palm Beach)
- Last race: 1956 Race #6 (Daytona Beach)
Wins	Top tens	Poles
0	2	0

John Choquette (December 28, 1928 – February 23, 2013) was an American stock car and modified stock car racing driver. He was the winner of the 1954 NASCAR Modified Division championship and was the grandfather of ASA Midwest Tour driver Jeff Choquette.

== Career ==
Born in Montclair, New Jersey, Choquette made his name in racing in southern Florida, having moved from New Jersey to make his home in Lake Worth. He was a regular competitor at Palm Beach Speedway and Medley Speedway during the 1950s, in addition to competing at other Florida tracks. Competing in NASCAR's Modified division, he won the series' 1953 Southeastern regional championship, and in 1954 was awarded the national NASCAR Modified championship, beating Tommy Elliott, Banjo Matthews and Cotton Owens for the title.

In 1955 and 1956, Choquette made six starts in the NASCAR Grand National Division, now known as the Cup Series; his best finish in the series was second, which he achieved in his first race in the series in February 1955 at Palm Beach Speedway. His final race in the Grand National Division was on the Daytona Beach Road Course in February 1956; he started seventh in the event, but finished 68th in a field of 76 cars. He remained a regular Modified driver into the 1960s, as well as competing in the Micro division at Boynton Speedway.

Choquette's son, John, and grandson, Jeff, both followed him into racing careers; Jack assisted his grandson's racing efforts in ASA and NASCAR competition.

Choquette died on February 23, 2013; he was buried in Royal Palm Beach, Florida, leaving four children, seventeen grandchildren and seven great-grandchildren.

== Motorsports career results ==
=== NASCAR ===
(key) (Bold – Pole position awarded by qualifying time. Italics – Pole position earned by points standings or practice time. * – Most laps led.)

==== Grand National Series ====
NASCAR Grand National Series results
Year	Team	No.	Make	1	2	3	4	5	6	7	8	9	10	11	12	13	14	15	16	17	18	19	20	21	22	23	24	25	26	27	28	29	30	31	32	33	34	35	36	37	38	39	40	41	42	43	44	45	46	47	48	49	50	51	52	53	54	55	56	NGNC	Pts	Ref
1955	George Miller	23	Hudson	TCS	PBS; 2	JSP; 13	DAB; 12	OSP; 13	CLB	HBO	NWS	MGY	LAN	CLT	HCY	ASF	TUS	MAR	RCH	NCF	FOR	LIN	MCF	FON	AIR	CLT	PIF	CLB	AWS	MOR	ALS	NYF	SAN	CLT	FOR	MAS	RSP	DAR	MGY	LAN	RSP	GPS	MAS	CLB	MAR	LVP	NWS	HBO												54th	-	
1956		91	Olds	HCY	CLT	WSS	PBS; 9	ASF																																																				164th	-	
1956	Bob Osiecki	290	Dodge						DAB; 68	PBS	WIL	ATL	NWS	LAN	RCH	CLB	CON	GPS	HCY	HBO	MAR	LIN	CLT	POR	EUR	NYF	MER	MAS	CLT	MCF	POR	AWS	RSP	PIF	CSF	CHI	CCF	MGY	OKL	ROA	OBS	SAN	NOR	PIF	MYB	POR	DAR	CSH	CLT	LAN	POR	CLB	HBO	NWP	CLT	CCF	MAR	HCY	WIL	164th	-	

Sporting positions
Preceded by Joe Weatherly	NASCAR Modified Division Champion; 1954	Succeeded by Bill Widenhouse
