= Jeff Choquette =

American stock car racing driver

- Born: December 22, 1986 (age 39); The Acreage, Florida, U.S.
- Achievements: 2018 Winchester 400 winner 2007 ASA Late Model Series Champion

NASCAR FedEx Freight Truck Series career
- 4 races run over 2 years
- 2014 position: 58th
- Best finish: 43rd (2012)
- First race: 2012 American Ethanol 200 (Iowa)
- Last race: 2014 American Ethanol 200 (Iowa)
Wins	Top tens	Poles
0	2	0
- Statistics up to date as of July 11, 2014.

Jeff Choquette (born December 22, 1986) is an American professional stock car racing driver. Grandson of 1954 NASCAR Modified champion Jack Choquette, he currently competes part-time in the ASA Midwest Tour.

== Racing career ==
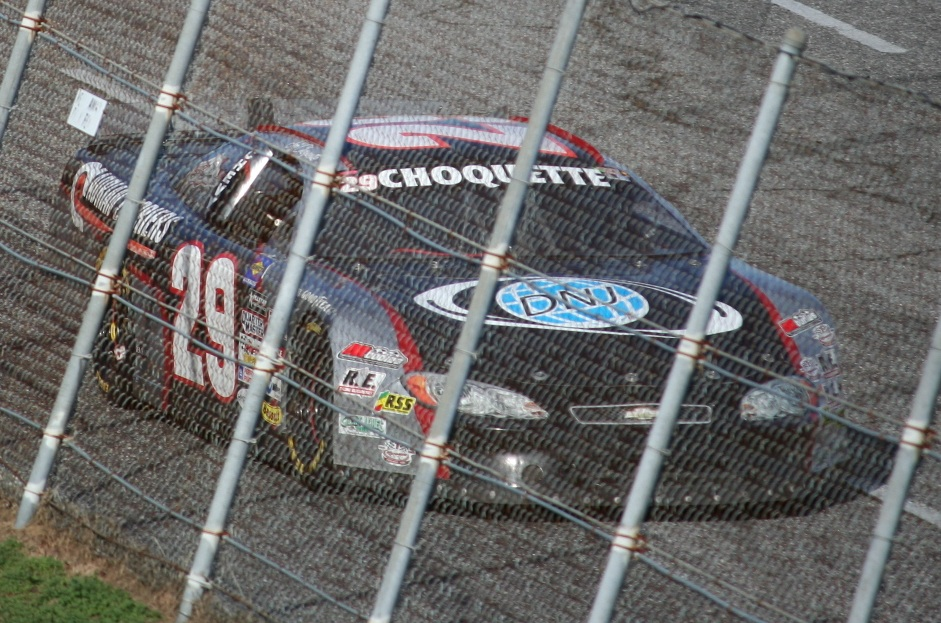
Choquette at North Wilkesboro Speedway in 2010

A native of The Acreage, Florida, Choquette began his racing career at age of eight in kart racing; he moved to stock car racing at the age of 11, and in 2004, he won the Florida Governor's Cup 200 at New Smyrna Speedway, becoming the youngest winner ever of the event. Choquette also played baseball in high school but chose to concentrate on a racing career.

In 2005, Choquette participated in Roush Fenway Racing's Roush Racing: Driver X reality show, competing for a Truck Series ride with the team. The youngest of 25 drivers in the competition, he failed to make the cut. In 2007, competing in the ASA Late Model Series, Choquette won the South Division championship. In 2009, he won the World Crown 300 at Gresham Motorsports Park, but was disqualified after his car failed post-race inspection.

Choquette currently competes in the ASA Midwest Tour; he scored his first win in the series in 2011 at Iowa Speedway. In 2012, he made his Camping World Truck Series debut at Iowa Speedway in July, driving the No. 97 Chevrolet for the Adrian Carriers Racing Team; he drove to 11th place in his first event in the series. Choquette also drove for the team in the ARCA Racing Series at the Illinois State Fairgrounds in August, finishing 25th in his debut race, before returning to the Camping World Truck Series in its second race of the year at Iowa Speedway in September, finishing eighth in the event; Choquette would race once more in the series in 2012, at Phoenix International Raceway, finishing 30th after an accident.

== Motorsports career results ==
=== NASCAR ===
(key) (Bold – Pole position awarded by qualifying time. Italics – Pole position earned by points standings or practice time. * – Most laps led.)

==== Camping World Truck Series ====
NASCAR Camping World Truck Series results
Year	Team	No.	Make	1	2	3	4	5	6	7	8	9	10	11	12	13	14	15	16	17	18	19	20	21	22	NCWTC	Pts	Ref
2012	Adrian Carriers Racing Team	97	Chevy	DAY	MAR	CAR	KAN	CLT	DOV	TEX	KEN	IOW; 11	CHI	POC	MCH	BRI	ATL	IOW; 8	KEN	LVS	TAL	MAR	TEX	PHO; 30	HOM	43rd	83	
2014	Adrian Carriers Racing Team	97	Chevy	DAY	MAR	KAN	CLT	DOV	TEX	GTW	KEN	IOW; 7	ELD	POC	MCH	BRI	MSP	CHI	NHA	LVS	TAL	MAR	TEX	PHO	HOM	58th	37	

^{*} Season still in progress
^{1} Ineligible for series points

=== ARCA Racing Series ===
(key) (Bold – Pole position awarded by qualifying time. Italics – Pole position earned by points standings or practice time. * – Most laps led.)

ARCA Racing Series results
Year	Team	No.	Make	1	2	3	4	5	6	7	8	9	10	11	12	13	14	15	16	17	18	19	20	ARSC	Pts	Ref
2012	Brad Hill Motorsports	70	Ford	DAY	MOB	SLM	TAL	TOL	ELK	POC	MCH	WIN	NJE	IOW	CHI	IRP	POC	BLN	ISF; 25	MAD	SLM	DSF	KAN	122nd	105	

=== ASA STARS National Tour ===
(key) (Bold – Pole position awarded by qualifying time. Italics – Pole position earned by points standings or practice time. * – Most laps led. ** – All laps led.)

ASA STARS National Tour results
Year	Team	No.	Make	1	2	3	4	5	6	7	8	9	10	ASNTC	Pts	Ref
2024	Larry Blount	21C	N/A	NSM; 23	FIF	HCY	MAD	MLW	AND	OWO	TOL	WIN	NSV	85th	29	
