= Mark Beard (racing driver) =

NASCAR team owner and retired race car driver (1948–2021)

- Born: Mark William Beard Sr. October 27, 1948; Mt. Pleasant, Michigan, U.S.
- Died: January 31, 2021 (aged 72); Mt. Pleasant, Michigan, U.S.
- Education: Central Michigan University, Northwood College
- Occupations: Owner, Beard Motorsports
- Years active: 2009–2021
- Employer: Beard Motorsports (owner)

NASCAR O'Reilly Auto Parts Series career
- 2 races run over 3 years
- Best finish: 83rd (1986)
- First race: 1982 Goody's 300 (Daytona)
- Last race: 1986 Winn-Dixie 300 (Charlotte)
| Wins | Top tens | Poles |
|---|---|---|
| 0 | 0 | 0 |

Mark William Beard Sr. (October 27, 1948 – January 31, 2021) was an American stock car racing team owner and driver who owned the NASCAR Cup Series team Beard Motorsports. As a driver, he competed in the Automobile Racing Club of America (ARCA) and NASCAR Busch Series.

== Racing career ==
Beard began his career in kart racing at the age of eight before moving to drag racing as a teenager; although his father established communications with Ford Motor Company about a potential drag racing sponsorship, he sold his Lincoln–Mercury dealership and the deal fell through. In 1972, he made his oval track racing debut at Mount Pleasant Speedway and other local tracks. One of his car owners was two-time Indianapolis 500 winner Gordon Johncock, also a Michigan native who got his racing oil from the Beard family.

Beard later competed in ARCA and United States Auto Club (USAC) events. In 1982, he ran the inaugural NASCAR Budweiser Late Model Sportsman Series race at Daytona International Speedway; racing for his own team and receiving guidance from eventual series champion Jack Ingram, he finished 18th. However, a lack of sponsorship prevented him from attempting further races, with his second and final start in the series coming in 1986 at Charlotte Motor Speedway (finishing 26th after suffering tire problems throughout the day), and he instead focused on ARCA. He also fielded cars in the early 1990s for drivers like future SS-Green Light Racing team owner Bobby Dotter.

Beard attempted to qualify for the 1994 and 1995 Busch races at Michigan International Speedway, but failed in both. The 1995 attempt, which was mainly attributed to his car using an older engine, would be his final entry into a NASCAR race.

== Team owner ==
In 2009, Beard founded Beard Motorsports for Clay Rogers in the ARCA Re/Max Series. Five years later, the team attempted two NASCAR Cup Series races with Rogers, but failed to qualify for both of them. In 2017, Brendan Gaughan was hired as the team's only driver to drive for the team, and they managed to lock themselves for the 2017 Daytona 500 as an open, non-chartered team.

After Gaughan's retirement in 2020, Noah Gragson was hired to drive the No. 62 in the 2021 Daytona 500. The team continued with plans to run the race following Beard's death two weeks prior.

== Personal life ==
Beard was born on October 27, 1948, to Leo and Glenna Beard. He worked with his father in the oil industry at Hub Oil and Beard Oil and Supply, and formed M&L Petroleum Inc. in 1984; he founded Beard Oil Distributing in 2005. Beard graduated from Mt. Pleasant High School in 1966 and attended Central Michigan University and Northwood College.

Beard and his wife Linda had two children Amie and Mark. Mark Beard II worked for M&L Petroleum and also competed for Beard Motorsports in the ASA Late Model Series.

Beard died at his home on January 31, 2021.

== Motorsports career results ==
=== NASCAR ===
(key) (Bold – Pole position awarded by qualifying time. Italics – Pole position earned by points standings or practice time. * – Most laps led.)

==== Busch Series ====
NASCAR Busch Series results
| Year | Team | No. | Make | 1 | 2 | 3 | 4 | 5 | 6 | 7 | 8 | 9 | 10 | 11 | 12 | 13 | 14 | 15 | 16 | 17 | 18 | 19 | 20 | 21 | 22 | 23 | 24 | 25 | 26 | 27 | 28 | 29 | 30 | 31 | NBSC | Pts | Ref |
|---|---|---|---|---|---|---|---|---|---|---|---|---|---|---|---|---|---|---|---|---|---|---|---|---|---|---|---|---|---|---|---|---|---|---|---|---|---|
| 1982 | Beard Racing | 16 | Pontiac | DAY; 16 | RCH | BRI | MAR | DAR | HCY | SBO | CRW | RCH | LGY | DOV | HCY | CLT | ASH | HCY | SBO | CAR | CRW | SBO | HCY | LGY | IRP | BRI | HCY | RCH | MAR | CLT | HCY | MAR | | | 138th | 109 | |
| 1986 | Beard Racing | 38 | Pontiac | DAY | CAR | HCY | MAR | BRI | DAR | SBO | LGY | JFC | DOV | CLT; 26 | SBO | HCY | ROU | IRP | SBO | RAL | OXF | SBO | HCY | LGY | ROU | BRI | DAR | RCH | DOV | MAR | ROU | CLT | CAR | MAR | 83rd | 85 | |
| 1994 | Beard Racing | | Olds | DAY | CAR | RCH | ATL | MAR | DAR | HCY | BRI | ROU | NHA | NZH | CLT | DOV | MYB | GLN | MLW | SBO | TAL | HCY | IRP | MCH; DNQ | BRI | DAR | RCH | DOV | CLT | MAR | CAR | | | | NA | – | |
| 1995 | Beard Racing | | Olds | DAY | CAR | RCH | ATL | NSV | DAR | BRI | HCY | NHA | NZH | CLT | DOV | MYB | GLN | MLW | TAL | SBO | IRP | MCH; DNQ | BRI | DAR | RCH | DOV | CLT | CAR | HOM | | | | | | N/A | – | |
