= 2020 YellaWood 500 =

NASCAR Cup Series race

Race details
- Race 31 of 36 in the 2020 NASCAR Cup Series
- 2020 YellaWood 500 program cover
- Date: October 4, 2020
- Location: Talladega Superspeedway in Lincoln, Alabama
- Course: Permanent racing facility
- Course length: 2.66 miles (4.28 km)
- Distance: 200 laps, 532 mi (856 km)
- Scheduled distance: 188 laps, 500.08 mi (804.64 km)
- Average speed: 129.774 miles per hour (208.851 km/h)

Pole position
Driver	Denny Hamlin	Joe Gibbs Racing
- Grid positions set by competition-based formula

Most laps led
Driver	Joey Logano	Team Penske
- Laps: 45

Winner
No. 11	Denny Hamlin	Joe Gibbs Racing

Television in the United States
- Network: NBC
- Announcers: Rick Allen, Jeff Burton, Dale Earnhardt Jr. (Charlotte) and Steve Letarte (Talladega)
- Nielsen ratings: 1.9 (3.10 million)

Radio in the United States
- Radio: MRN
- Booth announcers: Alex Hayden and Jeff Striegle
- Turn announcers: Dave Moody (1 & 2), Mike Bagley (Backstretch) and Dan Hubbard (3 & 4)

The 2020 YellaWood 500 was a NASCAR Cup Series race held on October 4, 2020 at Talladega Superspeedway in Lincoln, Alabama. Contested over 200 laps—extended from 188 laps due to an overtime finish, on the 2.66 mile (4.2 km) superspeedway, it was the 31st race of the 2020 NASCAR Cup Series season, the fifth race of the Playoffs, and the second race of the Round of 12.

== Report ==
=== Background ===
Talladega Superspeedway, the track where the race was held.

Talladega Superspeedway, originally known as Alabama International Motor Superspeedway (AIMS), is a motorsports complex located north of Talladega, Alabama. It is located on the former Anniston Air Force Base in the small city of Lincoln. The track is a tri-oval and was constructed in the 1960s by the International Speedway Corporation, a business controlled by the France family. Talladega is most known for its steep banking and the unique location of the start/finish line that's located just past the exit to pit road. The track currently hosts the NASCAR series such as the NASCAR Cup Series, Xfinity Series and the Gander RV & Outdoors Truck Series. Talladega is the longest NASCAR oval with a length of 2.66-mile-long (4.28 km) tri-oval like the Daytona International Speedway, which also is a 2.5-mile-long (4 km) tri-oval.

==== Entry list ====
- (R) denotes rookie driver.
- (i) denotes driver who are ineligible for series driver points.

No.	Driver	Team	Manufacturer
00	Quin Houff (R)	StarCom Racing	Chevrolet
1	Kurt Busch	Chip Ganassi Racing	Chevrolet
2	Brad Keselowski	Team Penske	Ford
3	Austin Dillon	Richard Childress Racing	Chevrolet
4	Kevin Harvick	Stewart-Haas Racing	Ford
6	Ryan Newman	Roush Fenway Racing	Ford
8	Tyler Reddick (R)	Richard Childress Racing	Chevrolet
9	Chase Elliott	Hendrick Motorsports	Chevrolet
10	Aric Almirola	Stewart-Haas Racing	Ford
11	Denny Hamlin	Joe Gibbs Racing	Toyota
12	Ryan Blaney	Team Penske	Ford
13	Ty Dillon	Germain Racing	Chevrolet
14	Clint Bowyer	Stewart-Haas Racing	Ford
15	Brennan Poole (R)	Premium Motorsports	Chevrolet
17	Chris Buescher	Roush Fenway Racing	Ford
18	Kyle Busch	Joe Gibbs Racing	Toyota
19	Martin Truex Jr.	Joe Gibbs Racing	Toyota
20	Erik Jones	Joe Gibbs Racing	Toyota
21	Matt DiBenedetto	Wood Brothers Racing	Ford
22	Joey Logano	Team Penske	Ford
24	William Byron	Hendrick Motorsports	Chevrolet
27	Cody Ware	Rick Ware Racing	Chevrolet
32	Corey LaJoie	Go Fas Racing	Ford
34	Michael McDowell	Front Row Motorsports	Ford
37	Ryan Preece	JTG Daugherty Racing	Chevrolet
38	John Hunter Nemechek (R)	Front Row Motorsports	Ford
41	Cole Custer (R)	Stewart-Haas Racing	Ford
42	Matt Kenseth	Chip Ganassi Racing	Chevrolet
43	Bubba Wallace	Richard Petty Motorsports	Chevrolet
47	Ricky Stenhouse Jr.	JTG Daugherty Racing	Chevrolet
48	Jimmie Johnson	Hendrick Motorsports	Chevrolet
51	Joey Gase (i)	Petty Ware Racing	Ford
53	James Davison	Rick Ware Racing	Chevrolet
62	Brendan Gaughan	Beard Motorsports	Chevrolet
66	Timmy Hill (i)	MBM Motorsports	Ford
77	Justin Haley (i)	Spire Motorsports	Chevrolet
88	Alex Bowman	Hendrick Motorsports	Chevrolet
95	Christopher Bell (R)	Leavine Family Racing	Toyota
96	Daniel Suárez	Gaunt Brothers Racing	Toyota
Official entry list

== Qualifying ==
Denny Hamlin was awarded the pole for the race as determined by competition-based formula.

=== Starting Lineup ===
Pos	No.	Driver	Team	Manufacturer
1	11	Denny Hamlin	Joe Gibbs Racing	Toyota
2	1	Kurt Busch	Chip Ganassi Racing	Chevrolet
3	19	Martin Truex Jr.	Joe Gibbs Racing	Toyota
4	88	Alex Bowman	Hendrick Motorsports	Chevrolet
5	4	Kevin Harvick	Stewart-Haas Racing	Ford
6	18	Kyle Busch	Joe Gibbs Racing	Toyota
7	2	Brad Keselowski	Team Penske	Ford
8	22	Joey Logano	Team Penske	Ford
9	14	Clint Bowyer	Stewart-Haas Racing	Ford
10	9	Chase Elliott	Hendrick Motorsports	Chevrolet
11	10	Aric Almirola	Stewart-Haas Racing	Ford
12	3	Austin Dillon	Richard Childress Racing	Chevrolet
13	21	Matt DiBenedetto	Wood Brothers Racing	Ford
14	12	Ryan Blaney	Team Penske	Ford
15	17	Chris Buescher	Roush Fenway Racing	Ford
16	20	Erik Jones	Joe Gibbs Racing	Toyota
17	48	Jimmie Johnson	Hendrick Motorsports	Chevrolet
18	41	Cole Custer (R)	Stewart-Haas Racing	Ford
19	6	Ryan Newman	Roush Fenway Racing	Ford
20	42	Matt Kenseth	Chip Ganassi Racing	Chevrolet
21	24	William Byron	Hendrick Motorsports	Chevrolet
22	95	Christopher Bell (R)	Leavine Family Racing	Toyota
23	38	John Hunter Nemechek (R)	Front Row Motorsports	Ford
24	34	Michael McDowell	Front Row Motorsports	Ford
25	37	Ryan Preece	JTG Daugherty Racing	Chevrolet
26	47	Ricky Stenhouse Jr.	JTG Daugherty Racing	Chevrolet
27	43	Bubba Wallace	Richard Petty Motorsports	Chevrolet
28	13	Ty Dillon	Germain Racing	Chevrolet
29	32	Corey LaJoie	Go Fas Racing	Ford
30	8	Tyler Reddick (R)	Richard Childress Racing	Chevrolet
31	96	Daniel Suárez	Gaunt Brothers Racing	Toyota
32	15	Brennan Poole (R)	Premium Motorsports	Chevrolet
33	00	Quin Houff (R)	StarCom Racing	Chevrolet
34	27	Cody Ware	Rick Ware Racing	Chevrolet
35	77	Justin Haley (i)	Spire Motorsports	Chevrolet
36	51	Joey Gase (i)	Petty Ware Racing	Ford
37	66	Timmy Hill (i)	MBM Motorsports	Ford
38	53	James Davison	Rick Ware Racing	Chevrolet
39	62	Brendan Gaughan	Beard Motorsports	Chevrolet
Official starting lineup

== Race ==
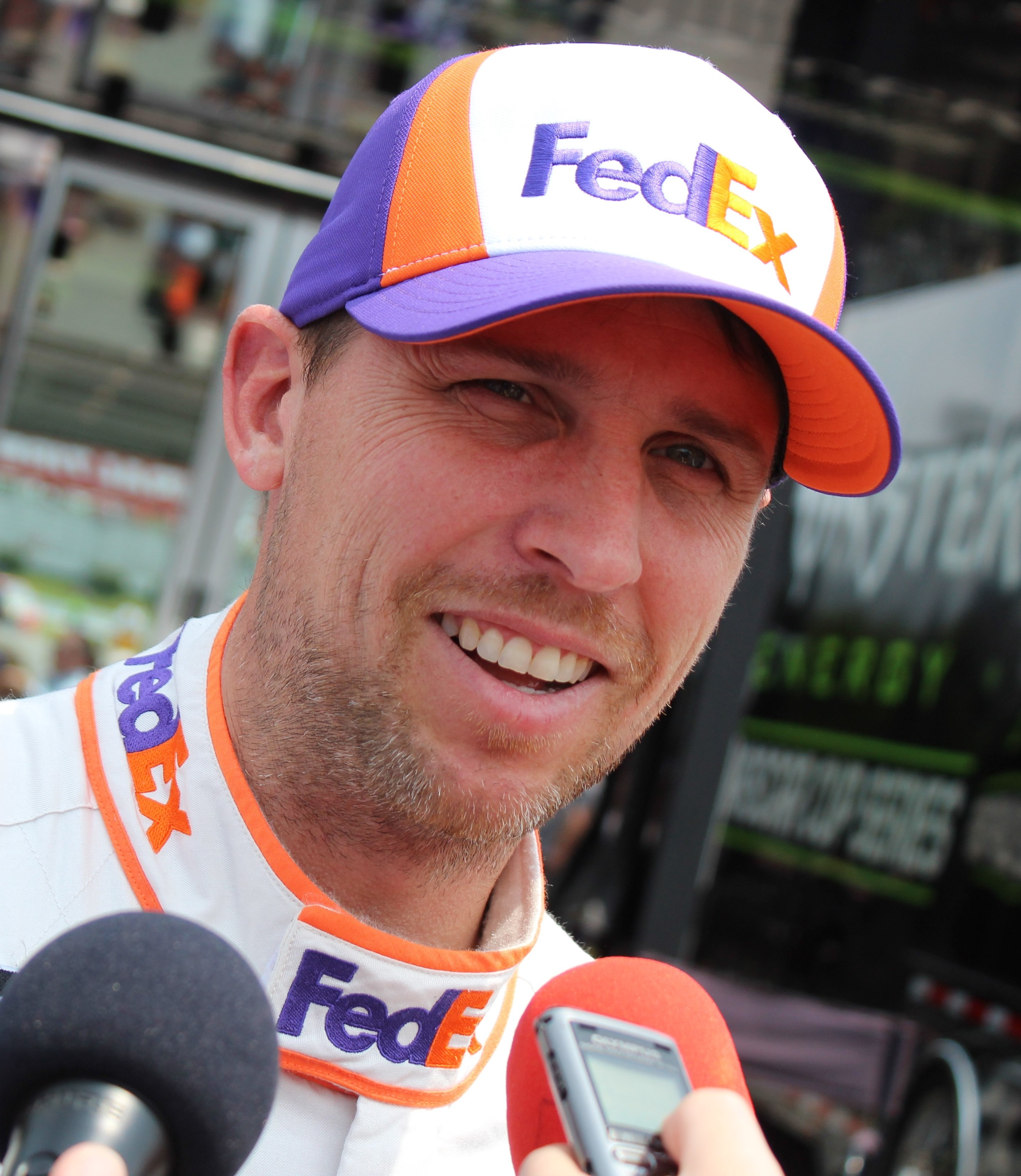
Denny Hamlin won the race.

=== Stage Results ===
Stage One Laps: 60

Pos	No	Driver	Team	Manufacturer	Points
1	17	Chris Buescher	Roush Fenway Racing	Ford	10
2	22	Joey Logano	Team Penske	Ford	9
3	3	Austin Dillon	Richard Childress Racing	Chevrolet	8
4	2	Brad Keselowski	Team Penske	Ford	7
5	20	Erik Jones	Joe Gibbs Racing	Toyota	6
6	9	Chase Elliott	Hendrick Motorsports	Chevrolet	5
7	8	Tyler Reddick (R)	Richard Childress Racing	Chevrolet	4
8	19	Martin Truex Jr.	Joe Gibbs Racing	Toyota	3
9	1	Kurt Busch	Chip Ganassi Racing	Chevrolet	2
10	41	Cole Custer (R)	Stewart-Haas Racing	Ford	1
Official stage one results

Stage Two Laps: 60

Pos	No	Driver	Team	Manufacturer	Points
1	19	Martin Truex Jr.	Joe Gibbs Racing	Toyota	10
2	2	Brad Keselowski	Team Penske	Ford	9
3	17	Chris Buescher	Roush Fenway Racing	Ford	8
4	9	Chase Elliott	Hendrick Motorsports	Chevrolet	7
5	38	John Hunter Nemechek (R)	Front Row Motorsports	Ford	6
6	24	William Byron	Hendrick Motorsports	Chevrolet	5
7	12	Ryan Blaney	Team Penske	Ford	4
8	37	Ryan Preece	JTG Daugherty Racing	Chevrolet	3
9	13	Ty Dillon	Germain Racing	Chevrolet	2
10	43	Bubba Wallace	Richard Petty Motorsports	Chevrolet	1
Official stage two results

=== Final Stage Results ===
Stage Three Laps: 68 Extended because of Lap 182, 188, and 193 safety car situations.

Pos	Grid	No	Driver	Team	Manufacturer	Laps	Points
1	1	11	Denny Hamlin	Joe Gibbs Racing	Toyota	200	40
2	16	20	Erik Jones	Joe Gibbs Racing	Toyota	200	41
3	28	13	Ty Dillon	Germain Racing	Chevrolet	200	36
4	21	24	William Byron	Hendrick Motorsports	Chevrolet	200	38
5	10	9	Chase Elliott	Hendrick Motorsports	Chevrolet	200	44
6	19	6	Ryan Newman	Roush Fenway Racing	Ford	200	31
7	30	8	Tyler Reddick (R)	Richard Childress Racing	Chevrolet	200	34
8	23	38	John Hunter Nemechek (R)	Front Row Motorsports	Ford	200	35
9	32	15	Brennan Poole (R)	Premium Motorsports	Chevrolet	200	28
10	25	37	Ryan Preece	JTG Daugherty Racing	Chevrolet	200	30
11	35	77	Justin Haley (i)	Spire Motorsports	Chevrolet	200	0
12	12	3	Austin Dillon	Richard Childress Racing	Chevrolet	200	33
13	33	00	Quin Houff (R)	StarCom Racing	Chevrolet	200	24
14	4	88	Alex Bowman	Hendrick Motorsports	Chevrolet	200	23
15	37	66	Timmy Hill (i)	MBM Motorsports	Ford	200	0
16	20	42	Matt Kenseth	Chip Ganassi Racing	Chevrolet	200	21
17	36	51	Joey Gase (i)	Petty Ware Racing	Ford	200	0
18	7	2	Brad Keselowski	Team Penske	Ford	200	35
19	34	27	Cody Ware	Rick Ware Racing	Chevrolet	200	18
20	5	4	Kevin Harvick	Stewart-Haas Racing	Ford	200	17
21	13	21	Matt DiBenedetto	Wood Brothers Racing	Ford	200	16
22	15	17	Chris Buescher	Roush Fenway Racing	Ford	200	33
23	3	19	Martin Truex Jr.	Joe Gibbs Racing	Toyota	198	27
24	27	43	Bubba Wallace	Richard Petty Motorsports	Chevrolet	192	15
25	14	12	Ryan Blaney	Team Penske	Ford	192	16
26	8	22	Joey Logano	Team Penske	Ford	188	20
27	6	18	Kyle Busch	Joe Gibbs Racing	Toyota	188	10
28	29	32	Corey LaJoie	Go Fas Racing	Ford	188	9
29	17	48	Jimmie Johnson	Hendrick Motorsports	Chevrolet	133	8
30	38	53	James Davison	Rick Ware Racing	Chevrolet	118	7
31	18	41	Cole Custer (R)	Stewart-Haas Racing	Ford	108	7
32	2	1	Kurt Busch	Chip Ganassi Racing	Chevrolet	108	7
33	9	14	Clint Bowyer	Stewart-Haas Racing	Ford	108	4
34	31	96	Daniel Suárez	Gaunt Brothers Racing	Toyota	108	3
35	39	62	Brendan Gaughan	Beard Motorsports	Chevrolet	108	2
36	24	34	Michael McDowell	Front Row Motorsports	Ford	79	1
37	11	10	Aric Almirola	Stewart-Haas Racing	Ford	57	1
38	26	47	Ricky Stenhouse Jr.	JTG Daugherty Racing	Chevrolet	8	1
39	22	95	Christopher Bell (R)	Leavine Family Racing	Toyota	1	1
Official race results

=== Race statistics ===
- Lead changes: 58 among 18 different drivers
- Cautions/Laps: 13 for 54 laps
- Red flags: 2 for 21 minutes and 19 seconds
- Time of race: 4 hours, 5 minutes and 58 seconds
- Average speed: 129.774 miles per hour (208.851 km/h)

== Track limits controversy ==
Track limits are used at Daytona, Talladega, and the road courses. Officiating by NASCAR officials involving the finish of the race generated in regards to track limits drew considerable controversy afterwards. Initially, second-place finisher Matt DiBenedetto and sixth-place finisher Chase Elliott were penalized and moved to 21st and 22nd positions, respectively. NASCAR penalized DiBenedetto for forcing William Byron beyond track limits, marked with a double yellow line at the bottom of the track, and the sanctioning body penalized Elliott for voluntarily moving under the line. NASCAR later redistributed its penalty originally given to Elliott, assessing it to Chris Buescher for forcing Elliott beyond track limits. Race winner Denny Hamlin also maneuvered under the track limits boundaries on the final corner, but race officials ruled that he was avoiding a potential accident from DiBenedetto and Byron. Despite myriad negative reactions to the decision at Talladega and online, a NASCAR official later said that the rulings were "clear-cut". NBC commentators Dale Earnhardt Jr. and Dale Jarrett called for NASCAR to remove track limits, but the sanctioning body, citing safety concerns, said the rule would stay in place.

== Media ==
=== Television ===
NBC Sports covered the race on the television side. Rick Allen, Jeff Burton and six-time Talladega winner Dale Earnhardt Jr. called the action from the booth at Charlotte Motor Speedway, which was the last time this setup would be used, as starting with the next race booth commentators started calling races on site. Steve Letarte called the action on site. Dave Burns, Marty Snider and Kelli Stavast handled the pit road duties on site. Due to the red flag and to honour other programming commitments, the race was switched from NBC to NBCSN.

NBC / NBCSN
Booth announcers	Pit reporters
Lap-by-lap: Rick Allen; Color-commentator: Jeff Burton; Color-commentator: Dale Earnhardt Jr. On-Site analyst: Steve Letarte	Dave Burns; Marty Snider; Kelli Stavast

=== Radio ===
MRN had the radio call for the race, which was also simulcasted on Sirius XM NASCAR Radio. Alex Hayden and Jeff Striegle called the race for MRN when the field races thru the tri-oval. Dave Moody called the action from turn 1, Mike Bagley called the action for MRN when the field races down the backstraightaway, and Dan Hubbard called the race from the Sunoco tower just outside of turn 4. Winston Kelley and Steve Post called the action for MRN from pit lane.

MRN
Booth announcers	Turn announcers	Pit reporters
Lead announcer: Alex Hayden; Announcer: Jeff Striegle	Turns 1 & 2: Dave Moody; Backstretch: Mike Bagley; Turns 3 & 4: Dan Hubbard	Winston Kelley; Steve Post

== Standings after the race ==
Drivers' Championship standings

	Pos	Driver	Points
1	1	Denny Hamlin	3,141
1	2	Kevin Harvick	3,121 (–20)
3	3	Chase Elliott	3,097 (–44)
1	4	Brad Keselowski	3,094 (–47)
1	5	Martin Truex Jr.	3,085 (–56)
1	6	Alex Bowman	3,075 (–66)
2	7	Joey Logano	3,074 (–67)
	8	Kyle Busch	3,053 (–88)
3	9	Austin Dillon	3,053 (–88)
1	10	Kurt Busch	3,048 (–93)
1	11	Clint Bowyer	3,036 (–105)
1	12	Aric Almirola	3,026 (–115)
	13	Ryan Blaney	2,114 (–1,027)
2	14	William Byron	2,113 (–1,028)
1	15	Matt DiBenedetto	2,108 (–1,033)
1	16	Cole Custer	2,095 (–1,046)
Official driver's standings

Manufacturers' Championship standings

Pos	Manufacturer	Points
1	Ford	1,151
2	Toyota	1,091 (–60)
3	Chevrolet	1,046 (–105)

- Note: Only the first 16 positions are included for the driver standings.

Previous race: 2020 South Point 400	NASCAR Cup Series; 2020 season	Next race: 2020 Bank of America Roval 400
