= 2020 Coke Zero Sugar 400 =

NASCAR Cup Series race

Race details
- Race 26 of 36 in the 2020 NASCAR Cup Series
- The 2020 Coke Zero Sugar 400 program.
- Date: August 29, 2020
- Location: Daytona International Speedway in Daytona Beach, Florida
- Course: Permanent racing facility
- Course length: 2.5 miles (4 km)
- Distance: 164 laps, 410 mi (656 km)
- Scheduled distance: 160 laps, 400 mi (640 km)
- Average speed: 153.766 miles per hour (247.462 km/h)

Pole position
Driver	Kevin Harvick	Stewart-Haas Racing
- Grid positions set by competition-based formula

Most laps led
Driver	Joey Logano	Team Penske
- Laps: 36

Winner
No. 24	William Byron	Hendrick Motorsports

Television in the United States
- Network: NBC
- Announcers: Rick Allen, Jeff Burton, Steve Letarte and Dale Earnhardt Jr.
- Nielsen ratings: 3.869 million

Radio in the United States
- Radio: MRN
- Booth announcers: Alex Hayden, Jeff Striegle and Rusty Wallace
- Turn announcers: Dave Moody (1 & 2), Mike Bagley (Backstretch) and Jason Toy (3 & 4)

The 2020 Coke Zero Sugar 400 was a NASCAR Cup Series race held on August 29, 2020 at Daytona International Speedway in Daytona Beach, Florida. Contested over 164 laps—extended from 160 laps due to an overtime finish, on the 2.5-mile (4.0 km) superspeedway, it was the 26th race of the 2020 NASCAR Cup Series season, and the final race of the regular season before the playoffs.

== Report ==
=== Background ===
Daytona International Speedway, the site of the race.

The race was held at Daytona International Speedway, a race track located in Daytona Beach, Florida, United States. Since opening in 1959, the track is the home of the Daytona 500, the most prestigious race in NASCAR. In addition to NASCAR, the track also hosts races of ARCA, AMA Superbike, USCC, SCCA, and Motocross. It features multiple layouts including the primary 2.5 miles (4.0 km) high speed tri-oval, a 3.56 miles (5.73 km) sports car course, a 2.95 miles (4.75 km) motorcycle course, and a .25 miles (0.40 km) karting and motorcycle flat-track. The track's 180-acre (73 ha) infield includes the 29-acre (12 ha) Lake Lloyd, which has hosted powerboat racing. The speedway is owned and operated by International Speedway Corporation.

The track was built in 1959 by NASCAR founder William "Bill" France, Sr. to host racing held at the former Daytona Beach Road Course. His banked design permitted higher speeds and gave fans a better view of the cars. Lights were installed around the track in 1998 and today, it is the third-largest single lit outdoor sports facility. The speedway has been renovated three times, with the infield renovated in 2004 and the track repaved twice — in 1978 and in 2010.

On January 22, 2013, the track unveiled artist depictions of a renovated speedway. On July 5 of that year, ground was broken for a project that would remove the backstretch seating and completely redevelop the frontstretch seating. The renovation to the speedway is being worked on by Rossetti Architects. The project, named "Daytona Rising", was completed in January 2016, and it cost US $400 million, placing emphasis on improving fan experience with five expanded and redesigned fan entrances (called "injectors") as well as wider and more comfortable seating with more restrooms and concession stands. After the renovations, the track's grandstands include 101,000 permanent seats with the ability to increase permanent seating to 125,000. The project was completed before the start of Speedweeks.

==== Entry list ====
- (R) denotes rookie driver.
- (i) denotes driver who are ineligible for series driver points.

No.	Driver	Team	Manufacturer
00	Quin Houff (R)	StarCom Racing	Chevrolet
1	Kurt Busch	Chip Ganassi Racing	Chevrolet
2	Brad Keselowski	Team Penske	Ford
3	Austin Dillon	Richard Childress Racing	Chevrolet
4	Kevin Harvick	Stewart-Haas Racing	Ford
6	Ryan Newman	Roush Fenway Racing	Ford
7	Josh Bilicki (i)	Tommy Baldwin Racing	Chevrolet
8	Tyler Reddick (R)	Richard Childress Racing	Chevrolet
9	Chase Elliott	Hendrick Motorsports	Chevrolet
10	Aric Almirola	Stewart-Haas Racing	Ford
11	Denny Hamlin	Joe Gibbs Racing	Toyota
12	Ryan Blaney	Team Penske	Ford
13	Ty Dillon	Germain Racing	Chevrolet
14	Clint Bowyer	Stewart-Haas Racing	Ford
15	Brennan Poole (R)	Premium Motorsports	Chevrolet
17	Chris Buescher	Roush Fenway Racing	Ford
18	Kyle Busch	Joe Gibbs Racing	Toyota
19	Martin Truex Jr.	Joe Gibbs Racing	Toyota
20	Erik Jones	Joe Gibbs Racing	Toyota
21	Matt DiBenedetto	Wood Brothers Racing	Ford
22	Joey Logano	Team Penske	Ford
24	William Byron	Hendrick Motorsports	Chevrolet
27	J. J. Yeley (i)	Rick Ware Racing	Chevrolet
32	Corey LaJoie	Go Fas Racing	Ford
34	Michael McDowell	Front Row Motorsports	Ford
37	Ryan Preece	JTG Daugherty Racing	Chevrolet
38	John Hunter Nemechek (R)	Front Row Motorsports	Ford
41	Cole Custer (R)	Stewart-Haas Racing	Ford
42	Matt Kenseth	Chip Ganassi Racing	Chevrolet
43	Bubba Wallace	Richard Petty Motorsports	Chevrolet
47	Ricky Stenhouse Jr.	JTG Daugherty Racing	Chevrolet
48	Jimmie Johnson	Hendrick Motorsports	Chevrolet
51	James Davison	Petty Ware Racing	Ford
53	Joey Gase (i)	Rick Ware Racing	Ford
62	Brendan Gaughan	Beard Motorsports	Chevrolet
66	Timmy Hill (i)	MBM Motorsports	Toyota
77	Ross Chastain (i)	Spire Motorsports	Chevrolet
88	Alex Bowman	Hendrick Motorsports	Chevrolet
95	Christopher Bell (R)	Leavine Family Racing	Toyota
96	Daniel Suárez	Gaunt Brothers Racing	Toyota
Official entry list

== Qualifying ==
Kevin Harvick was awarded the pole for the race as determined by competition-based formula.

=== Starting Lineup ===
Pos	No.	Driver	Team	Manufacturer
1	4	Kevin Harvick	Stewart-Haas Racing	Ford
2	19	Martin Truex Jr.	Joe Gibbs Racing	Toyota
3	22	Joey Logano	Team Penske	Ford
4	2	Brad Keselowski	Team Penske	Ford
5	10	Aric Almirola	Stewart-Haas Racing	Ford
6	24	William Byron	Hendrick Motorsports	Chevrolet
7	48	Jimmie Johnson	Hendrick Motorsports	Chevrolet
8	88	Alex Bowman	Hendrick Motorsports	Chevrolet
9	12	Ryan Blaney	Team Penske	Ford
10	11	Denny Hamlin	Joe Gibbs Racing	Toyota
11	18	Kyle Busch	Joe Gibbs Racing	Toyota
12	3	Austin Dillon	Richard Childress Racing	Chevrolet
13	1	Kurt Busch	Chip Ganassi Racing	Chevrolet
14	14	Clint Bowyer	Stewart-Haas Racing	Ford
15	21	Matt DiBenedetto	Wood Brothers Racing	Ford
16	41	Cole Custer (R)	Stewart-Haas Racing	Ford
17	17	Chris Buescher	Roush Fenway Racing	Ford
18	8	Tyler Reddick (R)	Richard Childress Racing	Chevrolet
19	42	Matt Kenseth	Chip Ganassi Racing	Chevrolet
20	20	Erik Jones	Joe Gibbs Racing	Toyota
21	43	Bubba Wallace	Richard Petty Motorsports	Chevrolet
22	6	Ryan Newman	Roush Fenway Racing	Ford
23	95	Christopher Bell (R)	Leavine Family Racing	Toyota
24	38	John Hunter Nemechek (R)	Front Row Motorsports	Ford
25	32	Corey LaJoie	Go Fas Racing	Ford
26	34	Michael McDowell	Front Row Motorsports	Ford
27	9	Chase Elliott	Hendrick Motorsports	Chevrolet
28	37	Ryan Preece	JTG Daugherty Racing	Chevrolet
29	13	Ty Dillon	Germain Racing	Chevrolet
30	96	Daniel Suárez	Gaunt Brothers Racing	Toyota
31	47	Ricky Stenhouse Jr.	JTG Daugherty Racing	Chevrolet
32	15	Brennan Poole (R)	Premium Motorsports	Chevrolet
33	27	J. J. Yeley (i)	Rick Ware Racing	Chevrolet
34	00	Quin Houff (R)	StarCom Racing	Chevrolet
35	66	Timmy Hill (i)	MBM Motorsports	Toyota
36	77	Ross Chastain (i)	Spire Motorsports	Chevrolet
37	53	Joey Gase (i)	Rick Ware Racing	Ford
38	51	James Davison	Petty Ware Racing	Ford
39	7	Josh Bilicki (i)	Tommy Baldwin Racing	Chevrolet
40	62	Brendan Gaughan	Beard Motorsports	Chevrolet
Official starting lineup

== Race ==
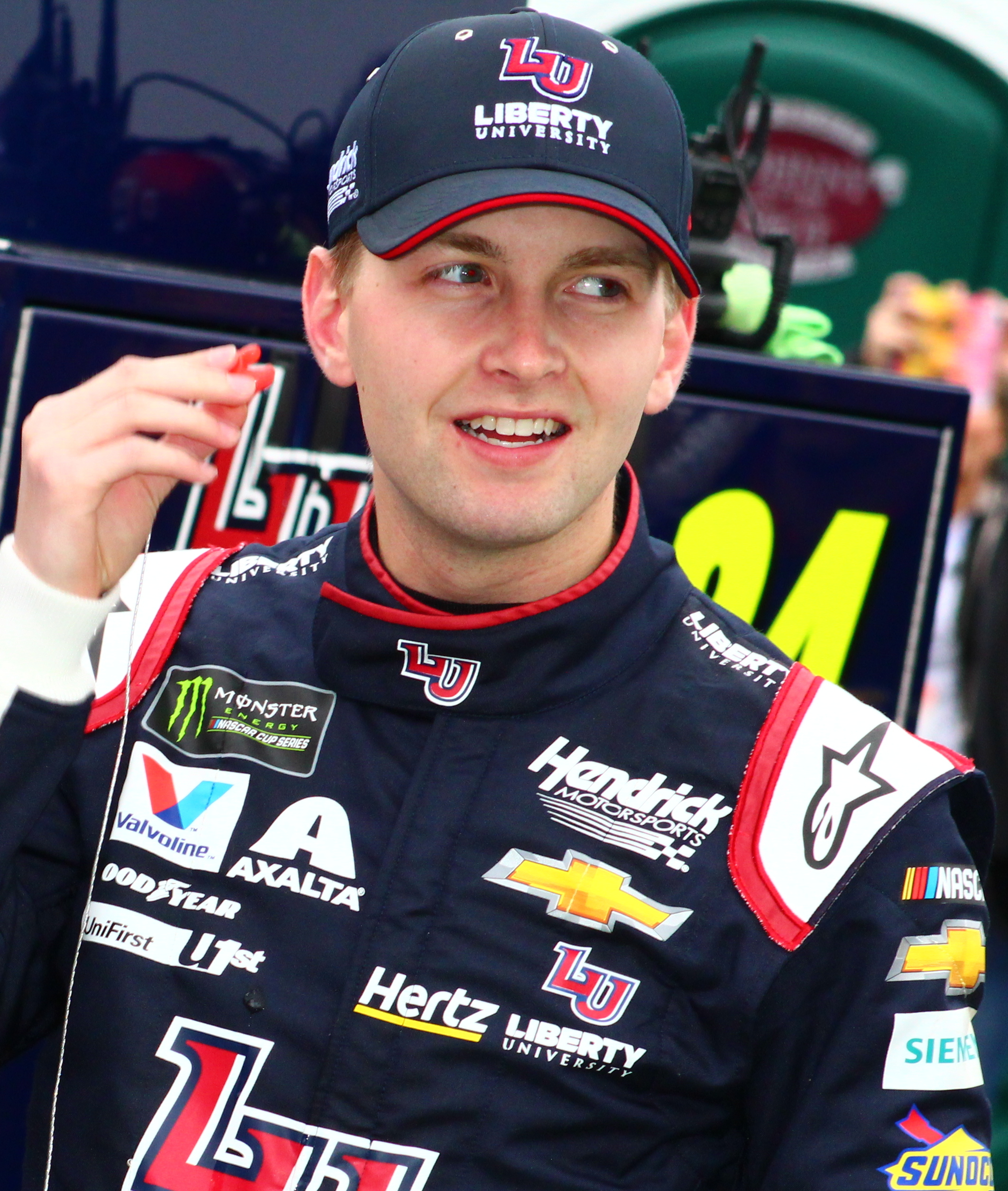
William Byron scored his first career win.

=== Stage Results ===
Stage One Laps: 50

Pos	No	Driver	Team	Manufacturer	Points
1	22	Joey Logano	Team Penske	Ford	10
2	20	Erik Jones	Joe Gibbs Racing	Toyota	9
3	8	Tyler Reddick (R)	Richard Childress Racing	Chevrolet	8
4	12	Ryan Blaney	Team Penske	Ford	7
5	48	Jimmie Johnson	Hendrick Motorsports	Chevrolet	6
6	95	Christopher Bell (R)	Leavine Family Racing	Toyota	5
7	24	William Byron	Hendrick Motorsports	Chevrolet	4
8	34	Michael McDowell	Front Row Motorsports	Ford	3
9	11	Denny Hamlin	Joe Gibbs Racing	Toyota	2
10	18	Kyle Busch	Joe Gibbs Racing	Toyota	1
Official stage one results

Stage Two Laps: 50

Pos	No	Driver	Team	Manufacturer	Points
1	22	Joey Logano	Team Penske	Ford	10
2	19	Martin Truex Jr.	Joe Gibbs Racing	Toyota	9
3	14	Clint Bowyer	Stewart-Haas Racing	Ford	8
4	1	Kurt Busch	Chip Ganassi Racing	Chevrolet	7
5	48	Jimmie Johnson	Hendrick Motorsports	Chevrolet	6
6	2	Brad Keselowski	Team Penske	Ford	5
7	21	Matt DiBenedetto	Wood Brothers Racing	Ford	4
8	47	Ricky Stenhouse Jr.	JTG Daugherty Racing	Chevrolet	3
9	12	Ryan Blaney	Team Penske	Ford	2
10	95	Christopher Bell (R)	Leavine Family Racing	Toyota	1
Official stage two results

=== Final Stage Results ===
Stage Three Laps: 60

Pos	Grid	No	Driver	Team	Manufacturer	Laps	Points
1	6	24	William Byron	Hendrick Motorsports	Chevrolet	164	44
2	27	9	Chase Elliott	Hendrick Motorsports	Chevrolet	164	35
3	10	11	Denny Hamlin	Joe Gibbs Racing	Toyota	164	36
4	2	19	Martin Truex Jr.	Joe Gibbs Racing	Toyota	164	42
5	21	43	Bubba Wallace	Richard Petty Motorsports	Chevrolet	164	32
6	9	12	Ryan Blaney	Team Penske	Ford	164	40
7	8	88	Alex Bowman	Hendrick Motorsports	Chevrolet	164	30
8	40	62	Brendan Gaughan	Beard Motorsports	Chevrolet	164	29
9	17	17	Chris Buescher	Roush Fenway Racing	Ford	164	28
10	4	2	Brad Keselowski	Team Penske	Ford	164	32
11	24	38	John Hunter Nemechek (R)	Front Row Motorsports	Ford	164	26
12	15	21	Matt DiBenedetto	Wood Brothers Racing	Ford	164	29
13	23	95	Christopher Bell (R)	Leavine Family Racing	Toyota	164	30
14	26	34	Michael McDowell	Front Row Motorsports	Ford	164	26
15	32	15	Brennan Poole (R)	Premium Motorsports	Chevrolet	164	22
16	36	77	Ross Chastain (i)	Spire Motorsports	Chevrolet	164	0
17	7	48	Jimmie Johnson	Hendrick Motorsports	Chevrolet	164	32
18	5	10	Aric Almirola	Stewart-Haas Racing	Ford	164	19
19	14	14	Clint Bowyer	Stewart-Haas Racing	Ford	164	26
20	1	4	Kevin Harvick	Stewart-Haas Racing	Ford	164	17
21	25	32	Corey LaJoie	Go Fas Racing	Ford	163	16
22	29	13	Ty Dillon	Germain Racing	Chevrolet	163	15
23	34	00	Quin Houff (R)	StarCom Racing	Chevrolet	162	14
24	35	66	Timmy Hill (i)	MBM Motorsports	Toyota	161	0
25	12	3	Austin Dillon	Richard Childress Racing	Chevrolet	161	12
26	30	96	Daniel Suárez	Gaunt Brothers Racing	Toyota	159	11
27	3	22	Joey Logano	Team Penske	Ford	158	30
28	19	42	Matt Kenseth	Chip Ganassi Racing	Chevrolet	158	9
29	18	8	Tyler Reddick (R)	Richard Childress Racing	Chevrolet	158	16
30	16	41	Cole Custer (R)	Stewart-Haas Racing	Ford	158	7
31	37	53	Joey Gase (i)	Rick Ware Racing	Ford	158	0
32	31	47	Ricky Stenhouse Jr.	JTG Daugherty Racing	Chevrolet	155	8
33	11	18	Kyle Busch	Joe Gibbs Racing	Toyota	152	5
34	13	1	Kurt Busch	Chip Ganassi Racing	Chevrolet	151	10
35	20	20	Erik Jones	Joe Gibbs Racing	Toyota	151	11
36	22	6	Ryan Newman	Roush Fenway Racing	Ford	151	1
37	28	37	Ryan Preece	JTG Daugherty Racing	Chevrolet	151	1
38	39	7	Josh Bilicki (i)	Tommy Baldwin Racing	Chevrolet	151	0
39	38	51	James Davison	Petty Ware Racing	Ford	139	1
40	33	27	J. J. Yeley (i)	Rick Ware Racing	Chevrolet	3	0
Official race results

=== Race statistics ===
- Lead changes: 35 among 16 different drivers
- Cautions/Laps: 6 for 21
- Red flags: 2 for 15 minutes and 47 seconds
- Time of race: 2 hours, 39 minutes and 59 seconds
- Average speed: 153.766 miles per hour (247.462 km/h)

== Media ==
=== Television ===
NBC Sports covered the race on the television side. Rick Allen, 2000 Coke Zero 400 winner Jeff Burton, Steve Letarte and two-time Coke Zero 400 winner Dale Earnhardt Jr. covered the race from the booth at Charlotte Motor Speedway. Dave Burns, Parker Kligerman and Marty Snider handled the pit road duties on site, and Rutledge Wood handled the features from his home during the race.

NBC
Booth announcers	Pit reporters	Features reporter
Lap-by-lap: Rick Allen; Color-commentator: Jeff Burton; Color-commentator: Steve Letarte; Color-commentator: Dale Earnhardt Jr.	Dave Burns; Parker Kligerman; Marty Snider	Rutledge Wood

=== Radio ===
MRN had the radio call for the race, which was also simulcast on Sirius XM NASCAR Radio.

MRN Radio
Booth announcers	Turn announcers	Pit reporters
Lead announcer: Alex Hayden; Announcer: Jeff Striegle; Announcer: Rusty Wallace	Turns 1 & 2: Dave Moody; Backstretch: Mike Bagley; Turns 3 & 4: Jason Toy	Winston Kelley; Steve Post

== Standings after the race ==
Drivers' Championship standings after Playoffs reset

	Pos	Driver	Points
	1	Kevin Harvick	2,057
	2	Denny Hamlin	2,047 (–10)
	3	Brad Keselowski	2,029 (–28)
1	4	Joey Logano	2,022 (–35)
2	5	Chase Elliott	2,020 (–37)
2	6	Martin Truex Jr.	2,014 (–43)
1	7	Ryan Blaney	2,013 (–44)
4	8	Alex Bowman	2,009 (–48)
5	9	William Byron	2,007 (–50)
8	10	Austin Dillon	2,005 (–52)
8	11	Cole Custer	2,005 (–52)
4	12	Aric Almirola	2,005 (–52)
2	13	Clint Bowyer	2,004 (–53)
5	14	Kyle Busch	2,003 (–54)
5	15	Kurt Busch	2,001 (–56)
3	16	Matt DiBenedetto	2,000 (–57)
Official driver's standings

Manufacturers' Championship standings

Pos	Manufacturer	Points
1	Ford	964
2	Toyota	914 (–50)
3	Chevrolet	871 (–93)

- Note: Only the first 16 positions are included for the driver standings.

Previous race: 2020 Drydene 311	NASCAR Cup Series; 2020 season	Next race: 2020 Cook Out Southern 500
