= Glynn Motorsports =

Former NASCAR team

Glynn Motorsports is a former NASCAR Busch Series and Craftsman Truck Series team. The team was owned by businessman Scott Glynn before it filed for bankruptcy in January 2006.

Glynn made its debut in 2005 when it announced it would merge with Akins Motorsports to field the No. 58 Serta/Hickory Farms Dodge Charger driven by rookie Brent Sherman. Sherman had a ninth-place finish at Talladega Superspeedway, but was released midseason in favor of Regan Smith. The team soon picked up sponsorship from Samson Stone and Who's Your Daddy?, and Smith had eight top-twenty finishes and three top-five starts. He finished 33rd in points. The team also fielded a second car late in the year, the No. 92 driven by Tracy Hines and Clay Rogers.

The team's truck operation debuted at Mansfield Motorsports Park in the Truck series in 2005. Regan Smith drove the No. 65 Dodge Ram to a 22nd-place finish. He ran four races for Glynn in the trucks, his best finish a twentieth at The Milwaukee Mile. Clay Rogers ran six races for Glynn in the trucks as well, posting two top-ten finishes. Tim Fedewa finished out the year for the team, posting a tenth at Las Vegas Motor Speedway and three top-five starts.

During the offseason, Rogers was scheduled to run with Glynn in the Busch Series in 2006, but the team ran out of financing. The team's owners points were sold to MacDonald Motorsports, and the equipment was purchased by Carver Racing.
