= 2025 Jack Link's 500 =

Race details
- Race 10 of 36 in the 2025 NASCAR Cup Series
- 2025 Jack Link's 500 official program
- Date: April 27, 2025
- Location: Talladega Superspeedway in Lincoln, Alabama
- Course: Permanent racing facility
- Course length: 2.66 miles (4.28 km)
- Distance: 188 laps, 500.08 mi (804.64 km)
- Average speed: 157.203 miles per hour (252.994 km/h)

Pole position
Driver	Zane Smith	Front Row Motorsports
- Time: 52.565

Most laps led
Driver	Ty Gibbs	Joe Gibbs Racing
- Laps: 32

Fastest lap
Driver	Michael McDowell	Spire Motorsports
- Time: 47.900

Winner
No. 2	Austin Cindric	Team Penske

Television in the United States
- Network: Fox
- Announcers: Mike Joy, Clint Bowyer, and Kevin Harvick
- Nielsen ratings: 4.041 million

Radio in the United States
- Radio: MRN
- Booth announcers: Alex Hayden, Mike Bagley, and Todd Gordon
- Turn announcers: Dave Moody (1 & 2), Dan Hubbard (Backstretch), and Tim Catafalmo (3 & 4)

The 2025 Jack Link's 500 was a NASCAR Cup Series race held on April 27, 2025, at Talladega Superspeedway in Lincoln, Alabama. Contested over 188 laps on the 2.66 mile (4.28 km) superspeedway, it was the 10th race of the 2025 NASCAR Cup Series season.

Austin Cindric won the race. Kyle Larson finished 2nd, and William Byron finished 3rd. Noah Gragson and Chase Elliott rounded out the top five, and Carson Hocevar, Alex Bowman, Bubba Wallace, Daniel Suárez, and Austin Dillon rounded out the top ten. Ryan Preece and Joey Logano originally finished second and fifth, respectively, but were disqualified for spoiler violations.

== Report ==
=== Background ===
Talladega Superspeedway, the track where the race was held.

Talladega Superspeedway, formerly known as Alabama International Motor Speedway, is a motorsports complex located north of Talladega, Alabama. It is located on the former Anniston Air Force Base in the small city of Lincoln. A tri-oval, the track was constructed in 1969 by the International Speedway Corporation, a business controlled by the France family. Talladega is most known for its steep banking. The track currently hosts NASCAR's Cup Series, Xfinity Series and Craftsman Truck Series. Talladega is the longest NASCAR oval with a length of 2.66-mile-long (4.28 km) tri-oval like the Daytona International Speedway, which is 2.5-mile-long (4.0 km).

==== Entry list ====
- (R) denotes rookie driver.
- (i) denotes driver who is ineligible for series driver points.

No.	Driver	Team	Manufacturer
1	Ross Chastain	Trackhouse Racing	Chevrolet
2	Austin Cindric	Team Penske	Ford
3	Austin Dillon	Richard Childress Racing	Chevrolet
4	Noah Gragson	Front Row Motorsports	Ford
5	Kyle Larson	Hendrick Motorsports	Chevrolet
6	Brad Keselowski	RFK Racing	Ford
7	Justin Haley	Spire Motorsports	Chevrolet
8	Kyle Busch	Richard Childress Racing	Chevrolet
9	Chase Elliott	Hendrick Motorsports	Chevrolet
10	Ty Dillon	Kaulig Racing	Chevrolet
11	Denny Hamlin	Joe Gibbs Racing	Toyota
12	Ryan Blaney	Team Penske	Ford
16	A. J. Allmendinger	Kaulig Racing	Chevrolet
17	Chris Buescher	RFK Racing	Ford
19	Chase Briscoe	Joe Gibbs Racing	Toyota
20	Christopher Bell	Joe Gibbs Racing	Toyota
21	Josh Berry	Wood Brothers Racing	Ford
22	Joey Logano	Team Penske	Ford
23	Bubba Wallace	23XI Racing	Toyota
24	William Byron	Hendrick Motorsports	Chevrolet
34	Todd Gilliland	Front Row Motorsports	Ford
35	Riley Herbst (R)	23XI Racing	Toyota
38	Zane Smith	Front Row Motorsports	Ford
41	Cole Custer	Haas Factory Team	Ford
42	John Hunter Nemechek	Legacy Motor Club	Toyota
43	Erik Jones	Legacy Motor Club	Toyota
44	J. J. Yeley	NY Racing Team	Chevrolet
45	Tyler Reddick	23XI Racing	Toyota
47	Ricky Stenhouse Jr.	Hyak Motorsports	Chevrolet
48	Alex Bowman	Hendrick Motorsports	Chevrolet
51	Cody Ware	Rick Ware Racing	Ford
54	Ty Gibbs	Joe Gibbs Racing	Toyota
60	Ryan Preece	RFK Racing	Ford
62	Anthony Alfredo (i)	Beard Motorsports	Chevrolet
71	Michael McDowell	Spire Motorsports	Chevrolet
77	Carson Hocevar	Spire Motorsports	Chevrolet
78	B. J. McLeod (i)	Live Fast Motorsports	Chevrolet
88	Shane van Gisbergen (R)	Trackhouse Racing	Chevrolet
99	Daniel Suárez	Trackhouse Racing	Chevrolet
Official entry list

== Qualifying ==
Zane Smith scored the pole for the race with a time of 52.565 and a speed of 182.174 mph (293.181 km/h).

=== Qualifying results ===
Pos	No.	Driver	Team	Manufacturer	R1	R2
1	38	Zane Smith	Front Row Motorsports	Ford	52.661	52.565
2	8	Kyle Busch	Richard Childress Racing	Chevrolet	52.814	52.697
3	22	Joey Logano	Team Penske	Ford	52.910	52.700
4	60	Ryan Preece	RFK Racing	Ford	52.801	52.700
5	3	Austin Dillon	Richard Childress Racing	Chevrolet	52.891	52.736
6	17	Chris Buescher	RFK Racing	Ford	52.907	52.761
7	2	Austin Cindric	Team Penske	Ford	52.873	52.780
8	21	Josh Berry	Wood Brothers Racing	Ford	52.904	52.795
9	12	Ryan Blaney	Team Penske	Ford	52.829	52.833
10	54	Ty Gibbs	Joe Gibbs Racing	Toyota	52.914	52.951
11	20	Christopher Bell	Joe Gibbs Racing	Toyota	52.927	—
12	41	Cole Custer	Haas Factory Team	Ford	52.941	—
13	11	Denny Hamlin	Joe Gibbs Racing	Toyota	52.983	—
14	71	Michael McDowell	Spire Motorsports	Chevrolet	52.991	—
15	34	Todd Gilliland	Front Row Motorsports	Ford	52.995	—
16	24	William Byron	Hendrick Motorsports	Chevrolet	53.028	—
17	19	Chase Briscoe	Joe Gibbs Racing	Toyota	53.061	—
18	48	Alex Bowman	Hendrick Motorsports	Chevrolet	53.083	—
19	16	A. J. Allmendinger	Kaulig Racing	Chevrolet	53.084	—
20	23	Bubba Wallace	23XI Racing	Toyota	53.122	—
21	10	Ty Dillon	Kaulig Racing	Chevrolet	53.123	—
22	6	Brad Keselowski	RFK Racing	Ford	53.139	—
23	35	Riley Herbst (R)	23XI Racing	Toyota	53.157	—
24	99	Daniel Suárez	Trackhouse Racing	Chevrolet	53.191	—
25	5	Kyle Larson	Hendrick Motorsports	Chevrolet	53.211	—
26	45	Tyler Reddick	23XI Racing	Toyota	53.222	—
27	4	Noah Gragson	Front Row Motorsports	Ford	53.264	—
28	77	Carson Hocevar	Spire Motorsports	Chevrolet	53.298	—
29	42	John Hunter Nemechek	Legacy Motor Club	Toyota	53.337	—
30	9	Chase Elliott	Hendrick Motorsports	Chevrolet	53.345	—
31	62	Anthony Alfredo (i)	Beard Motorsports	Chevrolet	53.381	—
32	1	Ross Chastain	Trackhouse Racing	Chevrolet	53.399	—
33	51	Cody Ware	Rick Ware Racing	Ford	53.417	—
34	43	Erik Jones	Legacy Motor Club	Toyota	53.503	—
35	47	Ricky Stenhouse Jr.	Hyak Motorsports	Chevrolet	53.534	—
36	88	Shane van Gisbergen (R)	Trackhouse Racing	Chevrolet	53.538	—
37	7	Justin Haley	Spire Motorsports	Chevrolet	53.563	—
38	78	B. J. McLeod (i)	Live Fast Motorsports	Chevrolet	54.103	—
39	44	J. J. Yeley	NY Racing Team	Chevrolet	55.671	—
Official qualifying results

== Race ==
=== Race results ===
==== Stage Results ====
Stage One Laps: 60

Pos	No	Driver	Team	Manufacturer	Points
1	5	Kyle Larson	Hendrick Motorsports	Chevrolet	10
2	24	William Byron	Hendrick Motorsports	Chevrolet	9
3	47	Ricky Stenhouse Jr.	Hyak Motorsports	Chevrolet	8
4	9	Chase Elliott	Hendrick Motorsports	Chevrolet	7
5	23	Bubba Wallace	23XI Racing	Toyota	6
6	11	Denny Hamlin	Joe Gibbs Racing	Toyota	5
7	16	A. J. Allmendinger	Kaulig Racing	Chevrolet	4
8	51	Cody Ware	Rick Ware Racing	Ford	3
9	35	Riley Herbst (R)	23XI Racing	Toyota	2
10	10	Ty Dillon	Kaulig Racing	Chevrolet	1
Official stage one results

Stage Two Laps: 60

Pos	No	Driver	Team	Manufacturer	Points
1	23	Bubba Wallace	23XI Racing	Toyota	10
2	5	Kyle Larson	Hendrick Motorsports	Chevrolet	9
3	2	Austin Cindric	Team Penske	Ford	8
4	77	Carson Hocevar	Spire Motorsports	Chevrolet	7
5	45	Tyler Reddick	23XI Racing	Toyota	6
6	21	Josh Berry	Wood Brothers Racing	Ford	5
7	34	Todd Gilliland	Front Row Motorsports	Ford	4
8	38	Zane Smith	Front Row Motorsports	Ford	3
9	7	Justin Haley	Spire Motorsports	Chevrolet	2
10	16	A. J. Allmendinger	Kaulig Racing	Chevrolet	1
Official stage two results

=== Final Stage Results ===
Stage Three Laps: 68

Pos	Grid	No	Driver	Team	Manufacturer	Laps	Points
1	7	2	Austin Cindric	Team Penske	Ford	188	48
2	25	5	Kyle Larson	Hendrick Motorsports	Chevrolet	188	54
3	16	24	William Byron	Hendrick Motorsports	Chevrolet	188	43
4	27	4	Noah Gragson	Front Row Motorsports	Ford	188	33
5	30	9	Chase Elliott	Hendrick Motorsports	Chevrolet	188	39
6	28	77	Carson Hocevar	Spire Motorsports	Chevrolet	188	38
7	18	48	Alex Bowman	Hendrick Motorsports	Chevrolet	188	30
8	20	23	Bubba Wallace	23XI Racing	Toyota	188	45
9	24	99	Daniel Suárez	Trackhouse Racing	Chevrolet	188	28
10	5	3	Austin Dillon	Richard Childress Racing	Chevrolet	188	27
11	14	71	Michael McDowell	Spire Motorsports	Chevrolet	188	27
12	35	47	Ricky Stenhouse Jr.	Hyak Motorsports	Chevrolet	188	33
13	12	41	Cole Custer	Haas Factory Team	Ford	188	24
14	26	45	Tyler Reddick	23XI Racing	Toyota	188	29
15	17	19	Chase Briscoe	Joe Gibbs Racing	Toyota	188	22
16	15	34	Todd Gilliland	Front Row Motorsports	Ford	188	26
17	10	54	Ty Gibbs	Joe Gibbs Racing	Toyota	188	20
18	34	43	Erik Jones	Legacy Motor Club	Toyota	188	19
19	1	38	Zane Smith	Front Row Motorsports	Ford	188	22
20	32	1	Ross Chastain	Trackhouse Racing	Chevrolet	188	17
21	13	11	Denny Hamlin	Joe Gibbs Racing	Toyota	188	21
22	23	35	Riley Herbst (R)	23XI Racing	Toyota	188	17
23	21	10	Ty Dillon	Kaulig Racing	Chevrolet	188	15
24	19	16	A. J. Allmendinger	Kaulig Racing	Chevrolet	188	18
25	37	7	Justin Haley	Spire Motorsports	Chevrolet	188	14
26	8	21	Josh Berry	Wood Brothers Racing	Ford	188	14
27	2	8	Kyle Busch	Richard Childress Racing	Chevrolet	188	10
28	31	62	Anthony Alfredo (i)	Beard Motorsports	Chevrolet	188	0
29	36	88	Shane van Gisbergen (R)	Trackhouse Racing	Chevrolet	187	8
30	29	42	John Hunter Nemechek	Legacy Motor Club	Toyota	187	7
31	33	51	Cody Ware	Rick Ware Racing	Ford	186	9
32	39	44	J. J. Yeley	NY Racing Team	Chevrolet	186	3
33	38	78	B. J. McLeod (i)	Live Fast Motorsports	Chevrolet	71	0
34	6	17	Chris Buescher	RFK Racing	Ford	51	3
35	11	20	Christopher Bell	Joe Gibbs Racing	Toyota	51	2
36	22	6	Brad Keselowski	RFK Racing	Ford	42	1
37	9	12	Ryan Blaney	Team Penske	Ford	42	1
DSQ	4	60	Ryan Preece	RFK Racing	Ford	188	1
DSQ	3	22	Joey Logano	Team Penske	Ford	188	1
Official race results

=== Race statistics ===
- Lead changes: 65 among 23 different drivers
- Cautions/Laps: 4 for 22
- Red flags: 0
- Time of race: 3 hours, 10 minutes and 52 seconds
- Average speed: 157.203 miles per hour (252.994 km/h)
- Margin of victory: 0.022 seconds

== Media ==
=== Television ===
Fox Sports covered their 25th race at the Talladega Superspeedway. Mike Joy, Clint Bowyer, and 2010 spring Talladega winner Kevin Harvick called the race from the broadcast booth. Jamie Little, Regan Smith, and Josh Sims handled pit road for the television side, and Larry McReynolds provided insight on-site during the race.

Fox
Booth announcers	Pit reporters	In-race analyst
Lap-by-lap: Mike Joy; Color-commentator: Clint Bowyer; Color-commentator: Kevin Harvick	Jamie Little; Regan Smith; Josh Sims	Larry McReynolds

=== Radio ===
MRN had the radio call for the race which was also simulcasted on Sirius XM NASCAR Radio. Alex Hayden, Mike Bagley, & former championship winning crew chief Todd Gordon called the race in the booth when the field raced through the tri-oval. Lead Turn Announcer for MRN Dave Moody called the race from the Sunoco spotters stand outside turn 2 when the field raced through turns 1 and 2. Dan Hubbard called the race from a platform inside the backstretch when the field raced down the backstretch and Tim Catafalmo called the race from the Sunoco spotters stand outside turn 4 when the field raced through turns 3 and 4. MRN Lead Pit Reporter Steve Post, Jason Toy, Alan Cavanna & Jacklyn Drake worked pit road for the radio side for MRN.

MRN Radio
Booth announcers	Turn announcers	Pit reporters
Lead announcer: Alex Hayden; Announcer: Mike Bagley; Announcer: Todd Gordon	Turns 1 & 2: Dave Moody; Backstretch: Dan Hubbard; Turns 3 & 4: Tim Catafalmo	Steve Post; Jason Toy; Alan Cavanna; Jacklyn Drake

== Standings after the race ==
Drivers' Championship standings

	Pos	Driver	Points
	1	William Byron	389
2	2	Kyle Larson	358 (–31)
1	3	Denny Hamlin	337 (–52)
1	4	Chase Elliott	317 (–72)
2	5	Christopher Bell	307 (–82)
1	6	Tyler Reddick	303 (–86)
1	7	Bubba Wallace	296 (–93)
2	8	Ryan Blaney	276 (–113)
1	9	Alex Bowman	274 (–115)
1	10	Ross Chastain	246 (–143)
2	11	Joey Logano	246 (–143)
1	12	Chase Briscoe	235 (–154)
1	13	Chris Buescher	230 (–159)
8	14	Austin Cindric	219 (–170)
1	15	A. J. Allmendinger	216 (–173)
1	16	Kyle Busch	210 (–179)
Official driver's standings

Manufacturers' Championship standings

	Pos	Manufacturer	Points
1	1	Chevrolet	362
1	2	Toyota	358 (–4)
	3	Ford	331 (–31)

- Note: Only the first 16 positions are included for the driver standings.
- . – Driver has clinched a position in the NASCAR Cup Series playoffs.

Previous race: 2025 Food City 500	NASCAR Cup Series; 2025 season	Next race: 2025 Würth 400
