= 2022 YellaWood 500 =

NASCAR Cup Series race

Race details
- Race 31 of 36 in the 2022 NASCAR Cup Series
- Date: October 2, 2022
- Location: Talladega Superspeedway in Lincoln, Alabama
- Course: Permanent racing facility
- Course length: 2.66 miles (4.28 km)
- Distance: 188 laps, 500.08 mi (804.8 km)
- Average speed: 153.569 miles per hour (247.145 km/h)

Pole position
| Driver | Christopher Bell | Joe Gibbs Racing |
- Time: 53.026

Most laps led
| Driver | Aric Almirola; Ross Chastain | Stewart-Haas Racing; Trackhouse Racing Team |
- Laps: 36

Winner
| No. 9 | Chase Elliott | Hendrick Motorsports |

Television in the United States
- Network: NBC
- Announcers: Rick Allen, Jeff Burton, Steve Letarte and Dale Earnhardt Jr.

Radio in the United States
- Radio: MRN
- Booth announcers: Alex Hayden, Jeff Striegle and Rusty Wallace
- Turn announcers: Dave Moody (1 & 2), Mike Bagley (Backstretch) and Dan Hubbard (3 & 4)

The 2022 YellaWood 500 was a NASCAR Cup Series race held on October 2, 2022, at Talladega Superspeedway in Lincoln, Alabama. Contested for 188 laps on the 2.66 mi (4.28 km) asphalt superspeedway, it was the 31st race of the 2022 NASCAR Cup Series season, fifth race of the Playoffs and second race of the Round of 12. Chase Elliott won the race, his fifth of the season, and 18th of his career.

== Report ==
=== Background ===
Talladega Superspeedway, the track where the race was held.

Talladega Superspeedway, originally known as Alabama International Motor Superspeedway (AIMS), is a motorsports complex located north of Talladega, Alabama. It is located on the former Anniston Air Force Base in the small city of Lincoln. The track is a tri-oval and was constructed in the 1960s by the International Speedway Corporation, a business controlled by the France family. Talladega is most known for its steep banking and the unique location of the start/finish line that's located just past the exit to pit road. The track currently hosts the NASCAR series such as the NASCAR Cup Series, Xfinity Series and the Camping World Truck Series. Talladega is the longest NASCAR oval with a length of 2.66-mile-long (4.28 km) tri-oval like the Daytona International Speedway, which also is a 2.5-mile-long (4 km) tri-oval.

Noah Gragson replaced Alex Bowman in the No. 48 car after Bowman suffered from concussion-like symptoms sustained after a rear impact crash on the previous race. Gragson had originally been intended to drive the No. 62 car for this race; Justin Allgaier replaced Gragson in the No. 62 car.

==== Entry list ====
- (R) denotes rookie driver.
- (i) denotes driver who is ineligible for series driver points.

| No. | Driver | Team | Manufacturer |
|---|---|---|---|
| 1 | Ross Chastain | Trackhouse Racing Team | Chevrolet |
| 2 | Austin Cindric (R) | Team Penske | Ford |
| 3 | Austin Dillon | Richard Childress Racing | Chevrolet |
| 4 | Kevin Harvick | Stewart-Haas Racing | Ford |
| 5 | Kyle Larson | Hendrick Motorsports | Chevrolet |
| 6 | Brad Keselowski | RFK Racing | Ford |
| 7 | Corey LaJoie | Spire Motorsports | Chevrolet |
| 8 | Tyler Reddick | Richard Childress Racing | Chevrolet |
| 9 | Chase Elliott | Hendrick Motorsports | Chevrolet |
| 10 | Aric Almirola | Stewart-Haas Racing | Ford |
| 11 | Denny Hamlin | Joe Gibbs Racing | Toyota |
| 12 | Ryan Blaney | Team Penske | Ford |
| 14 | Chase Briscoe | Stewart-Haas Racing | Ford |
| 15 | J. J. Yeley (i) | Rick Ware Racing | Ford |
| 16 | Daniel Hemric (i) | Kaulig Racing | Chevrolet |
| 17 | Chris Buescher | RFK Racing | Ford |
| 18 | Kyle Busch | Joe Gibbs Racing | Toyota |
| 19 | Martin Truex Jr. | Joe Gibbs Racing | Toyota |
| 20 | Christopher Bell | Joe Gibbs Racing | Toyota |
| 21 | Harrison Burton (R) | Wood Brothers Racing | Ford |
| 22 | Joey Logano | Team Penske | Ford |
| 23 | Ty Gibbs (i) | 23XI Racing | Toyota |
| 24 | William Byron | Hendrick Motorsports | Chevrolet |
| 31 | Justin Haley | Kaulig Racing | Chevrolet |
| 34 | Michael McDowell | Front Row Motorsports | Ford |
| 38 | Todd Gilliland (R) | Front Row Motorsports | Ford |
| 41 | Cole Custer | Stewart-Haas Racing | Ford |
| 42 | Ty Dillon | Petty GMS Motorsports | Chevrolet |
| 43 | Erik Jones | Petty GMS Motorsports | Chevrolet |
| 45 | Bubba Wallace | 23XI Racing | Toyota |
| 47 | Ricky Stenhouse Jr. | JTG Daugherty Racing | Chevrolet |
| 48 | Noah Gragson (i) | Hendrick Motorsports | Chevrolet |
| 51 | Cody Ware | Rick Ware Racing | Ford |
| 62 | Justin Allgaier (i) | Beard Motorsports | Chevrolet |
| 77 | Landon Cassill (i) | Spire Motorsports | Chevrolet |
| 78 | B. J. McLeod (i) | Live Fast Motorsports | Ford |
| 99 | Daniel Suárez | Trackhouse Racing Team | Chevrolet |
Official entry list

== Qualifying ==
Christopher Bell scored the pole for the race with a time of 53.026 and a speed of 180.591 mph (290.633 km/h).

=== Qualifying results ===
| Pos | No. | Driver | Team | Manufacturer | R1 | R2 |
|---|---|---|---|---|---|---|
| 1 | 20 | Christopher Bell | Joe Gibbs Racing | Toyota | 53.228 | 53.026 |
| 2 | 5 | Kyle Larson | Hendrick Motorsports | Chevrolet | 53.232 | 53.048 |
| 3 | 11 | Denny Hamlin | Joe Gibbs Racing | Toyota | 53.117 | 53.076 |
| 4 | 10 | Aric Almirola | Stewart-Haas Racing | Ford | 53.339 | 53.166 |
| 5 | 14 | Chase Briscoe | Stewart-Haas Racing | Ford | 53.202 | 53.268 |
| 6 | 1 | Ross Chastain | Trackhouse Racing Team | Chevrolet | 53.282 | 53.320 |
| 7 | 48 | Noah Gragson (i) | Hendrick Motorsports | Chevrolet | 53.415 | 53.356 |
| 8 | 8 | Tyler Reddick | Richard Childress Racing | Chevrolet | 53.327 | 53.388 |
| 9 | 24 | William Byron | Hendrick Motorsports | Chevrolet | 53.410 | 53.434 |
| 10 | 23 | Ty Gibbs (i) | 23XI Racing | Toyota | 53.345 | 0.000 |
| 11 | 22 | Joey Logano | Team Penske | Ford | 53.422 | — |
| 12 | 43 | Erik Jones | Petty GMS Motorsports | Chevrolet | 53.427 | — |
| 13 | 16 | Daniel Hemric (i) | Kaulig Racing | Chevrolet | 53.433 | — |
| 14 | 99 | Daniel Suárez | Trackhouse Racing Team | Chevrolet | 53.453 | — |
| 15 | 21 | Harrison Burton (R) | Wood Brothers Racing | Ford | 53.459 | — |
| 16 | 9 | Chase Elliott | Hendrick Motorsports | Chevrolet | 53.461 | — |
| 17 | 2 | Austin Cindric (R) | Team Penske | Ford | 53.465 | — |
| 18 | 6 | Brad Keselowski | RFK Racing | Ford | 53.468 | — |
| 19 | 12 | Ryan Blaney | Team Penske | Ford | 53.471 | — |
| 20 | 3 | Austin Dillon | Richard Childress Racing | Chevrolet | 53.493 | — |
| 21 | 31 | Justin Haley | Kaulig Racing | Chevrolet | 53.500 | — |
| 22 | 19 | Martin Truex Jr. | Joe Gibbs Racing | Toyota | 53.504 | — |
| 23 | 17 | Chris Buescher | RFK Racing | Ford | 53.551 | — |
| 24 | 4 | Kevin Harvick | Stewart-Haas Racing | Ford | 53.570 | — |
| 25 | 47 | Ricky Stenhouse Jr. | JTG Daugherty Racing | Chevrolet | 53.609 | — |
| 26 | 18 | Kyle Busch | Joe Gibbs Racing | Toyota | 53.668 | — |
| 27 | 45 | Bubba Wallace | 23XI Racing | Toyota | 53.680 | — |
| 28 | 41 | Cole Custer | Stewart-Haas Racing | Ford | 53.709 | — |
| 29 | 34 | Michael McDowell | Front Row Motorsports | Ford | 53.764 | — |
| 30 | 42 | Ty Dillon | Petty GMS Motorsports | Chevrolet | 53.781 | — |
| 31 | 62 | Justin Allgaier (i) | Beard Motorsports | Chevrolet | 53.862 | — |
| 32 | 7 | Corey LaJoie | Spire Motorsports | Chevrolet | 54.053 | — |
| 33 | 77 | Landon Cassill (i) | Spire Motorsports | Chevrolet | 54.086 | — |
| 34 | 38 | Todd Gilliland (R) | Front Row Motorsports | Ford | 54.098 | — |
| 35 | 78 | B. J. McLeod (i) | Live Fast Motorsports | Ford | 54.740 | — |
| 36 | 15 | J. J. Yeley (i) | Rick Ware Racing | Ford | 54.936 | — |
| 37 | 51 | Cody Ware | Rick Ware Racing | Ford | 54.940 | — |
Official qualifying results

== Race ==
=== Stage Results ===
Stage One Laps: 60

| Pos | No | Driver | Team | Manufacturer | Points |
|---|---|---|---|---|---|
| 1 | 12 | Ryan Blaney | Team Penske | Ford | 10 |
| 2 | 11 | Denny Hamlin | Joe Gibbs Racing | Toyota | 9 |
| 3 | 9 | Chase Elliott | Hendrick Motorsports | Chevrolet | 8 |
| 4 | 2 | Austin Cindric (R) | Team Penske | Ford | 7 |
| 5 | 22 | Joey Logano | Team Penske | Ford | 6 |
| 6 | 47 | Ricky Stenhouse Jr. | JTG Daugherty Racing | Chevrolet | 5 |
| 7 | 18 | Kyle Busch | Joe Gibbs Racing | Toyota | 4 |
| 8 | 5 | Kyle Larson | Hendrick Motorsports | Chevrolet | 3 |
| 9 | 48 | Noah Gragson (i) | Hendrick Motorsports | Chevrolet | 0 |
| 10 | 43 | Erik Jones | Petty GMS Motorsports | Chevrolet | 1 |
Official stage one results

Stage Two Laps: 60

| Pos | No | Driver | Team | Manufacturer | Points |
|---|---|---|---|---|---|
| 1 | 9 | Chase Elliott | Hendrick Motorsports | Chevrolet | 10 |
| 2 | 31 | Justin Haley | Kaulig Racing | Chevrolet | 9 |
| 3 | 5 | Kyle Larson | Hendrick Motorsports | Chevrolet | 8 |
| 4 | 99 | Daniel Suárez | Trackhouse Racing Team | Chevrolet | 7 |
| 5 | 43 | Erik Jones | Petty GMS Motorsports | Chevrolet | 6 |
| 6 | 1 | Ross Chastain | Trackhouse Racing Team | Chevrolet | 5 |
| 7 | 77 | Landon Cassill (i) | Spire Motorsports | Chevrolet | 0 |
| 8 | 17 | Chris Buescher | RFK Racing | Ford | 3 |
| 9 | 16 | Daniel Hemric (i) | Kaulig Racing | Chevrolet | 0 |
| 10 | 14 | Chase Briscoe | Stewart-Haas Racing | Ford | 1 |
Official stage two results

=== Final Stage Results ===
Stage Three Laps: 68

| Pos | Grid | No | Driver | Team | Manufacturer | Laps | Points |
|---|---|---|---|---|---|---|---|
| 1 | 16 | 9 | Chase Elliott | Hendrick Motorsports | Chevrolet | 188 | 58 |
| 2 | 19 | 12 | Ryan Blaney | Team Penske | Ford | 188 | 45 |
| 3 | 29 | 34 | Michael McDowell | Front Row Motorsports | Ford | 188 | 34 |
| 4 | 6 | 1 | Ross Chastain | Trackhouse Racing Team | Chevrolet | 188 | 38 |
| 5 | 3 | 11 | Denny Hamlin | Joe Gibbs Racing | Toyota | 188 | 41 |
| 6 | 12 | 43 | Erik Jones | Petty GMS Motorsports | Chevrolet | 188 | 38 |
| 7 | 34 | 38 | Todd Gilliland (R) | Front Row Motorsports | Ford | 188 | 30 |
| 8 | 14 | 99 | Daniel Suárez | Trackhouse Racing Team | Chevrolet | 188 | 36 |
| 9 | 17 | 2 | Austin Cindric (R) | Team Penske | Ford | 188 | 35 |
| 10 | 5 | 14 | Chase Briscoe | Stewart-Haas Racing | Ford | 188 | 28 |
| 11 | 33 | 77 | Landon Cassill (i) | Spire Motorsports | Chevrolet | 188 | 0 |
| 12 | 9 | 24 | William Byron | Hendrick Motorsports | Chevrolet | 188 | 25 |
| 13 | 20 | 3 | Austin Dillon | Richard Childress Racing | Chevrolet | 188 | 24 |
| 14 | 4 | 10 | Aric Almirola | Stewart-Haas Racing | Ford | 188 | 23 |
| 15 | 21 | 31 | Justin Haley | Kaulig Racing | Chevrolet | 188 | 31 |
| 16 | 27 | 45 | Bubba Wallace | 23XI Racing | Toyota | 188 | 21 |
| 17 | 1 | 20 | Christopher Bell | Joe Gibbs Racing | Toyota | 188 | 20 |
| 18 | 2 | 5 | Kyle Larson | Hendrick Motorsports | Chevrolet | 188 | 30 |
| 19 | 7 | 48 | Noah Gragson (i) | Hendrick Motorsports | Chevrolet | 188 | 0 |
| 20 | 26 | 18 | Kyle Busch | Joe Gibbs Racing | Toyota | 188 | 21 |
| 21 | 28 | 41 | Cole Custer | Stewart-Haas Racing | Ford | 188 | 16 |
| 22 | 25 | 47 | Ricky Stenhouse Jr. | JTG Daugherty Racing | Chevrolet | 188 | 20 |
| 23 | 30 | 42 | Ty Dillon | Petty GMS Motorsports | Chevrolet | 188 | 14 |
| 24 | 18 | 6 | Brad Keselowski | RFK Racing | Ford | 188 | 13 |
| 25 | 23 | 17 | Chris Buescher | RFK Racing | Ford | 188 | 15 |
| 26 | 22 | 19 | Martin Truex Jr. | Joe Gibbs Racing | Toyota | 188 | 11 |
| 27 | 11 | 22 | Joey Logano | Team Penske | Ford | 188 | 16 |
| 28 | 8 | 8 | Tyler Reddick | Richard Childress Racing | Chevrolet | 187 | 9 |
| 29 | 24 | 4 | Kevin Harvick | Stewart-Haas Racing | Ford | 187 | 8 |
| 30 | 31 | 62 | Justin Allgaier (i) | Beard Motorsports | Chevrolet | 186 | 0 |
| 31 | 36 | 15 | J. J. Yeley (i) | Rick Ware Racing | Ford | 184 | 0 |
| 32 | 37 | 51 | Cody Ware | Rick Ware Racing | Ford | 184 | 5 |
| 33 | 35 | 78 | B. J. McLeod (i) | Live Fast Motorsports | Ford | 182 | 0 |
| 34 | 13 | 16 | Daniel Hemric (i) | Kaulig Racing | Chevrolet | 179 | 0 |
| 35 | 32 | 7 | Corey LaJoie | Spire Motorsports | Chevrolet | 44 | 2 |
| 36 | 15 | 21 | Harrison Burton (R) | Wood Brothers Racing | Ford | 23 | 1 |
| 37 | 10 | 23 | Ty Gibbs (i) | 23XI Racing | Toyota | 23 | 0 |
Official race results

=== Race statistics ===
- Lead changes: 57 among 17 different drivers
- Cautions/Laps: 6 for 25 laps
- Red flags: 0
- Time of race: 3 hours, 15 minutes and 23 seconds
- Average speed: 153.569 miles per hour (247.145 km/h)

=== Penalties ===
Kevin Harvick, finishing 29th and already eliminated from the playoffs, was docked 100 owner and driver points when the NASCAR R&D Center discovered illegal alterations to his car's body. His crew chief Rodney Childers was also suspended for four races and fined $100,000. The points penalty meant Harvick had less than 2,000 points (playoff drivers are reset to 2,000 points, plus any bonus points) in the standings as an eliminated playoff driver.

== Media ==
=== Television ===
NBC Sports covered the race on the television side. Rick Allen, Jeff Burton, Steve Letarte and six-time Talladega winner Dale Earnhardt Jr. called the race from the broadcast booth. Dave Burns, Kim Coon, Parker Kligerman and Marty Snider handled the pit road duties from pit lane.

NBC
| Booth announcers | Pit reporters |
|---|---|
| Lap-by-lap: Rick Allen; Color-commentator: Jeff Burton; Color-commentator: Steve Letarte; Color-commentator: Dale Earnhardt Jr. | Dave Burns; Kim Coon; Parker Kligerman; Marty Snider |

=== Radio ===
MRN had the radio call for the race, which was also simulcasted on Sirius XM NASCAR Radio. Alex Hayden, Jeff Striegle and Rusty Wallace called the race for MRN when the field races thru the tri-oval. Dave Moody called the action from turn 1, Mike Bagley called the action for MRN when the field races down the backstraightaway, and Dan Hubbard called the race from the Sunoco tower just outside of turn 4. Steve Post, Alex Weaver, Brienne Pedigo, and Jason Toy called the action for MRN from pit lane.

MRN
| Booth announcers | Turn announcers | Pit reporters |
|---|---|---|
| Lead announcer: Alex Hayden; Announcer: Jeff Striegle; Announcer: Rusty Wallace | Turns 1 & 2: Dave Moody; Backstretch: Mike Bagley; Turns 3 & 4: Dan Hubbard | Steve Post; Alex Weaver; Brienne Pedigo; Jason Toy |

== Standings after the race ==
Drivers' Championship standings

| | Pos | Driver | Points |
|---|---|---|---|
| 6 | 1 | Chase Elliott | 3,103 |
| 3 | 2 | Ryan Blaney | 3,101 (–2) |
| 1 | 3 | Ross Chastain | 3,097 (–6) |
| 2 | 4 | Denny Hamlin | 3,090 (–13) |
| 4 | 5 | Joey Logano | 3,087 (–16) |
| 2 | 6 | Kyle Larson | 3,087 (–16) |
| 4 | 7 | William Byron (Note: On October 6, NASCAR reinstated 25 points to Byron after the points penalty for spinning Denny Hamlin during a caution period in the previous race was overturned.) | 3,083 (–20) |
| | 8 | Daniel Suárez | 3,081 (–22) |
| 1 | 9 | Austin Cindric | 3,069 (–34) |
| 1 | 10 | Chase Briscoe | 3,069 (–34) |
| | 11 | Christopher Bell | 3,036 (–67) |
| | 12 | Alex Bowman | 3,015 (–88) |
| | 13 | Tyler Reddick | 2,116 (–987) |
| | 14 | Austin Dillon | 2,107 (–996) |
| | 15 | Kyle Busch | 2,089 (–1,014) |
| | 16 | Kevin Harvick (Note: Harvick was deducted 100 points after the NASCAR R&D Center discovered illegal modifications to a single source-supplied part on his car.) | 1,971 (–1,132) |
Official driver's standings

Manufacturers' Championship standings

| Pos | Manufacturer | Points |
|---|---|---|
| 1 | Chevrolet | 1,147 |
| 2 | Ford | 1,069 (–78) |
| 3 | Toyota | 1,013 (–134) |

- Note: Only the first 16 positions are included for the driver standings.

== Notes ==
| Previous race: 2022 Autotrader EchoPark Automotive 500 | NASCAR Cup Series; 2022 season | Next race: 2022 Bank of America Roval 400 |
