= Beard Motorsports =

NASCAR team

- Owner(s): Linda Beard; Mark Beard Jr. Annie Beard
- Base: Mooresville, North Carolina
- Series: NASCAR Cup Series
- Race drivers: 62. Anthony Alfredo, Casey Mears (part-time)
- Manufacturer: Chevrolet
- Opened: 1982
- Website: beardoilmotorsports.com

Career
- Debut: Cup Series: 2017 Daytona 500 (Daytona); Busch Series: 1982 Goody's 300 (Daytona); ARCA Racing Series: 2009 Racing For Wildlife 200 (Michigan)
- Races competed: Total: 57; Cup Series: 39; Busch Series: 11; ARCA Racing Series: 7
- Drivers' Championships: Total: 0 Cup Series: 0 Busch Series: 0 ARCA Racing Series: 0
- Race victories: Total: 0 Cup Series: 0 Busch Series: 0 ARCA Racing Series: 0
- Pole positions: Total: 0 Cup Series: 0 Busch Series: 0 ARCA Racing Series: 0

Beard Motorsports is an American professional stock car racing team that competes part-time in the NASCAR Cup Series with the No. 62 Chevrolet ZL1 for Anthony Alfredo and Casey Mears. The team was created in 1982 by Mark Beard for competition in the NASCAR Busch Series. Beard Motorsports attempted two races in the Cup Series in 2014, with driver Clay Rogers, making none. After going dormant in 2015 and 2016, the team returned part-time in 2017 with Brendan Gaughan.

== Cup Series ==
Mark Beard founded the cup team during the 2014 NASCAR Sprint Cup Series. The race team's engine was built with old Hendrick Motorsports parts and with tests at various east coast tracks, including at New Hampshire Motor Speedway.

The team was on the entry list for the July race at Loudon but withdrew their car before attempting to qualify. The team then attempted to run at Richmond International Raceway two months later with Clay Rogers in the No. 75 Beard Oil Chevrolet; however, they failed to qualify for the race. The last time Beard Motorsports attempted to qualify for a race was at Phoenix International Raceway with Rogers, but weren't able to make the race.

The team did not attempt any races in 2015 or 2016.

In 2017, Beard Motorsports announced it would run the Daytona 500 with Brendan Gaughan in the No. 75 Beard Oil Chevrolet. Gaughan's Richard Childress Racing Xfinity Series pit crew serviced the car and the team used a Childress engine. The team also bought a car from Leavine Family Racing, a Childress satellite; the car had finished fifteenth in the previous year's Daytona 500 with Michael McDowell. The team did not possess a NASCAR charter. As one of the two fastest non-charter cars in qualifying, Gaughan was able to make the field.

Gaughan then secured an eleventh-place finish in the Daytona 500, the first race in the Cup Series for the team. The team announced it would enter the other three 2017 restrictor plate races. Gaughan and the team returned at Talladega, finishing 27th. Then on July 1 in the Coke Zero 400, Brendan Gaughan drove the team's car to a seventh-place finish, despite hitting the wall once in the race. The team's next race was the Alabama 500 at Talladega Superspeedway. Gaughan led laps and ended up seventeenth after avoiding the big one then being collected in the next crash.

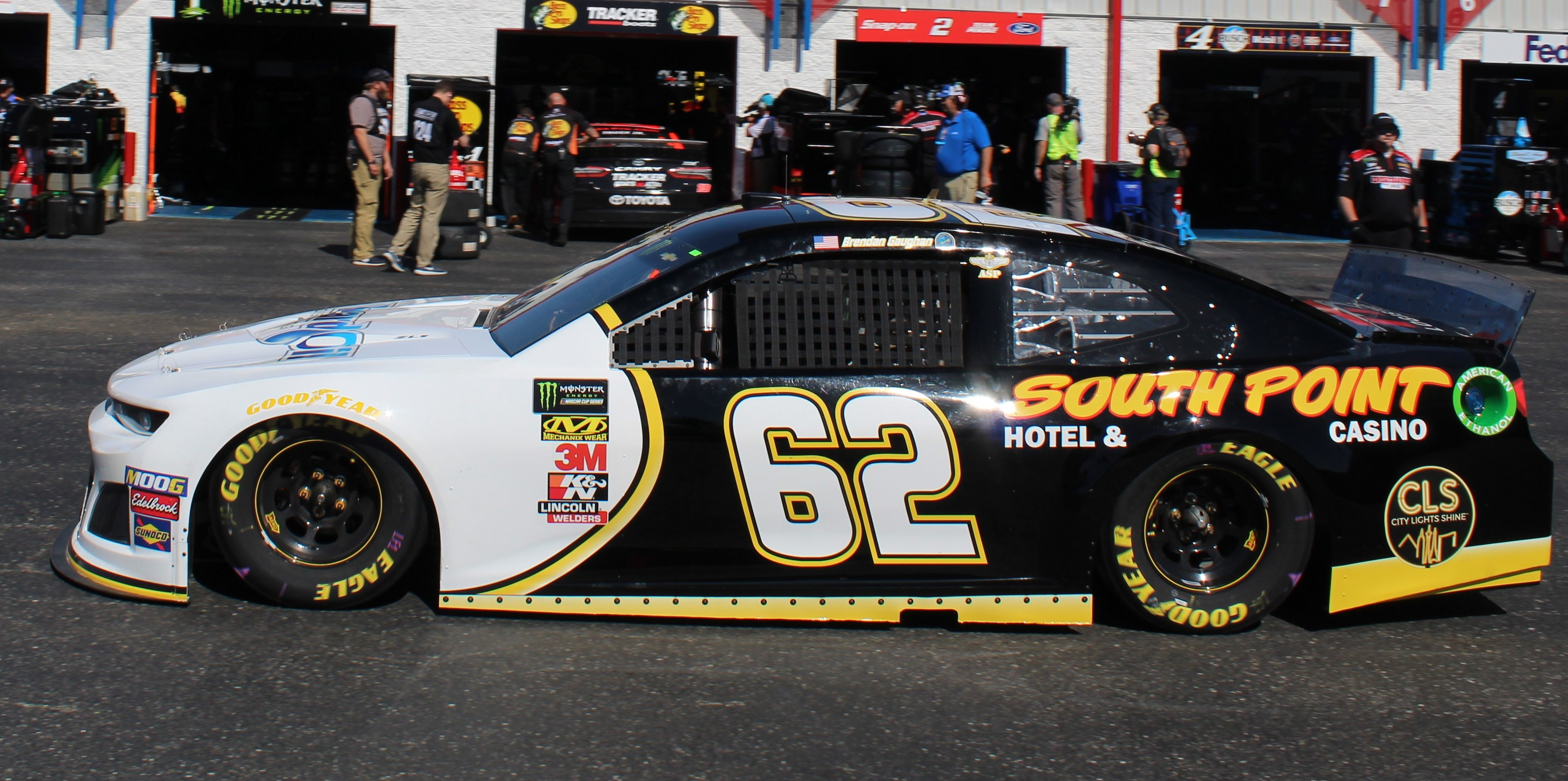
Brendan Gaughan in the No. 62 at Talladega Superspeedway in 2019

The team came back for the 2018 slate of restrictor-plate races as the No. 62 with Brendan Gaughan behind the wheel, and did the same as well in 2019, using cars from Richard Childress Racing, engines from ECR Engines, and technical support from the Childress crew.

2020 marked Gaughan's final season as a driver. He made the field at the 2020 Daytona 500 by posting the second fastest qualifying speed of all the non-charter teams (188.945 mph; 33rd overall). Gaughan's tenure with the team and career ended in the YellaWood 500 at Talladega, where he finished 35th after being collected in a Stage 2 wreck.

On January 14, 2021, Beard announced Noah Gragson would attempt to make his Cup debut in the Daytona 500. On January 31, just fourteen days before the 500, team owner Mark Beard died at age 72.

On September 7, 2021, Beard Motorsports announced they will return in the 2022 season, entering the No. 62 in all four superspeedway races with Gragson competing in the 2022 Daytona 500. Gragson finally made his debut, but he failed to finish being involved in a crash. He achieved sponsorship from Wendy's for Talladega and achieved his first ever top-twenty finish in a Cup Series race. Later on, at the August Daytona Race, Gragson finished fifth in the race, giving the team their first top 5 in a NASCAR Cup Series race.

Beard Motorsports attempted to make the 2023 Daytona 500 with Austin Hill, but Hill failed to make the field after a late crash resulted in an eighteenth-place finish in Duel 2 of the 2023 Bluegreen Vacations Duels.

For the 2024 season, Beard Motorsports signed Anthony Alfredo to drive the No. 62. Alfredo finished 27th at the 2024 Daytona 500 and scored a career-best sixth-place finish at Talladega. At the 2024 Coke Zero Sugar 400, Parker Retzlaff scored an impressive seventh-place finish after pushing Harrison Burton to the lead under an overtime finish.

For the 2025 season, Beard signed Alfredo to drive the No. 62 for multiple races. After failing to qualify for the Daytona 500, Alfredo would show a strong performance at Talladega, by leading nineteen laps, but finished 28th after the disqualifications of Joey Logano and Ryan Preece. On April 16, it was announced that Jesse Love will drive the No. 62 at Texas Motor Speedway and Indianapolis Motor Speedway.

For the 2026 season, Alfredo returned to drive the No. 62 for the Daytona 500. He failed to qualify on speed and had to race in the duels. He originally got into the 500, finishing higher than B. J. McLeod and J. J. Yeley, but due to an issue with tech regarding cooling hoses not being secured, he was DQ'd, which caused him to be DNQ'd from the 500. On March 31, it was announced that Casey Mears would drive the No. 62 in five races. He was originally scheduled to run Talladega in the Spring but failed to qualify. On May 27, it was announced that Pocono would be added to his schedule. He lost right-front wheel on lap 105, hitting the outside wall and having to DNF. He also completed at Indianapolis, finishing 35th. He plans to run at Daytona and Homestead—Miami to earn his 500th career Cup Series start.

=== Car No. 62 results ===
Year	Driver	No.	Make	1	2	3	4	5	6	7	8	9	10	11	12	13	14	15	16	17	18	19	20	21	22	23	24	25	26	27	28	29	30	31	32	33	34	35	36	Owners	Pts
2014	Clay Rogers	75	Chevy	DAY	PHO	LVS	BRI	CAL	MAR	TEX	DAR	RCH	TAL	KAN	CLT	DOV	POC	MCH	SON	KEN	DAY	NHA	IND	POC	GLN	MCH	BRI	ATL	RCH; DNQ	CHI	NHA	DOV	KAN	CLT	TAL	MAR	TEX	PHO; DNQ	HOM	54th	0
2017	Brendan Gaughan	75	Chevy	DAY; 11	ATL	LVS	PHO	CAL	MAR	TEX	BRI	RCH	TAL; 26	KAN	CLT	DOV	POC	MCH	SON	DAY; 7	KEN	NHA	IND	POC	GLN	MCH	BRI	DAR	RCH	CHI	NHA	DOV	CLT	TAL; 19	KAN	MAR	TEX	PHO	HOM	40th	85
2018	Brendan Gaughan	62	Chevy	DAY; 28	ATL	LVS	PHO	CAL	MAR	TEX	BRI	RCH	TAL; 22	DOV	KAN	CLT	POC	MCH	SON	CHI	DAY; 12	KEN	NHA	POC	GLN	MCH	BRI	DAR	IND	LVS	RCH	ROV	DOV	TAL; 12	KAN	MAR	TEX	PHO	HOM	40th	74
2019	Brendan Gaughan	62	Chevy	DAY; 23	ATL	LVS	PHO	CAL	MAR	TEX	BRI	RCH	TAL; 8	DOV	KAN	CLT	POC	MCH	SON	CHI	DAY; 20	KEN	NHA	POC	GLN	MCH	BRI	DAR	IND	LVS	RCH	ROV	DOV	TAL; 27	KAN	MAR	TEX	PHO	HOM	40th	71
2020	Brendan Gaughan	62	Chevy	DAY; 7	LVS	CAL	PHO	DAR	DAR	CLT	CLT	BRI	ATL	MAR	HOM	TAL; 21	POC	POC	IND	KEN	TEX	KAN	NHA	MCH	MCH	DRC; 39	DOV	DOV	DAY; 8	DAR	RCH	BRI	LVS	TAL; 35	ROV	KAN	TEX	MAR	PHO	40th	78
2021	Noah Gragson	62	Chevy	DAY; DNQ	DRC	HOM	LVS	PHO	ATL	BRD	MAR	RCH	TAL	KAN	DAR	DOV	COA	CLT	SON	NSH	POC	POC	ROA	ATL	NHA	GLN	IRC	MCH	DAY	DAR	RCH	BRI	LVS	TAL	ROV	TEX	KAN	MAR	PHO	45th	0
2022	Noah Gragson	62	Chevy	DAY; 31	CAL	LVS	PHO	ATL	COA	RCH	MAR	BRD	TAL; 20	DOV	DAR	KAN	CLT	GTW	SON	NSH	ROA	ATL	NHA	POC	IRC	MCH	RCH	GLN	DAY; 5	DAR	KAN	BRI	TEX							37th	62
2022	Justin Allgaier	62	Chevy																															TAL; 30	ROV	LVS	HOM	MAR	PHO	37th	62
2023	Austin Hill	62	Chevy	DAY; DNQ	CAL	LVS	PHO	ATL	COA	RCH	BRD	MAR	TAL; 24	DOV	KAN	DAR	CLT	GTW	SON	NSH	CSC	ATL; 37	NHA	POC	RCH	MCH; 28	IRC	GLN	DAY; 14	DAR	KAN	BRI	TEX	TAL	ROV; 27	LVS	HOM	MAR	PHO	40th	56
2024	Anthony Alfredo	62	Chevy	DAY; 27	ATL	LVS	PHO	BRI	COA	RCH	MAR	TEX	TAL; 6	DOV	KAN	DAR	CLT	GTW	SON	IOW	NHA	NSH	CSC	POC	IND	RCH	MCH							TAL; 24	ROV	LVS	HOM	MAR	PHO	37th	84
2024	Parker Retzlaff	62	Chevy																									DAY; 7	DAR	ATL	GLN	BRI	KAN							37th	84
2025	Anthony Alfredo	62	Chevy	DAY; DNQ	ATL	COA	PHO	LVS	HOM	MAR	DAR	BRI	TAL; 28																								TAL; 21	MAR	PHO	42nd	44
2025	Jesse Love	62	Chevy											TEX; 31	KAN	CLT	NSH	MCH	MXC	POC	ATL	CSC	SON	DOV	IND; 24	IOW	GLN	RCH	DAY	DAR	GTW	BRI	NHA	KAN	ROV	LVS				42nd	44
2026	Anthony Alfredo	62	Chevy	DAY; DNQ	ATL	COA	PHO	LVS	DAR	MAR	BRI	KAN																												44th	6
2026	Casey Mears	62	Chevy										TAL; DNQ	TEX	GLN	CLT	NSH	MCH	POC; 36	COR	SON	CHI	ATL	NWS	IND; 35	IOW	RCH	NHA	DAY; 37	DAR	GTW	BRI	KAN	LVS	CLT	PHO	TAL; 40	MAR	HOM; 37	44th	6

== Busch Series ==
=== Car No. 00 history ===
In the 1990s Beard fielded the No. 00 car for drivers like Gary Neice, Dana Patten, Bobby Dotter, L. D. Ottinger, Richard Lasater, Butch Miller, and Jim Brinkley Jr.

==== Car No. 00 results ====
Year	Driver	No.	Make	1	2	3	4	5	6	7	8	9	10	11	12	13	14	15	16	17	18	19	20	21	22	23	24	25	26	27	28	29	30	31	Owners	Pts
1990	Rich Bickle	00	Pontiac	DAY; DNQ	RCH	CAR	MAR	HCY	DAR	BRI	LAN	SBO	NZH	HCY	CLT	DOV	ROU																			
1990	Gary Neice	00	Olds															VOL; 16				SBO; 28														
1990	Dana Patten	00	Olds																MYB; 20	OXF	NHA															
1990	Bobby Dotter	00	Olds																				DUB; 16	IRP	ROU	BRI	DAR	RCH	DOV	MAR	CLT	NHA	CAR	MAR		
1991	L. D. Ottinger	00	Olds	DAY; 19	RCH	CAR	MAR																													
1991	Richard Lasater	00	Olds					VOL; 31																												
1991	Gary Neice	00	Olds						HCY; DNQ	DAR	BRI		SBO; 28	NZH	CLT	DOV	ROU	HCY	MYB	GLN	OXF	NHA	SBO													
1991	Butch Miller	00	Olds									LAN; 23																								
1991	Jim Brinkley Jr.	00	Olds																					DUB; 24	IRP	ROU	BRI	DAR	RCH	DOV	CLT	NHA	CAR	MAR		

=== Car No. 16 history ===
During his driving career, Mark Beard raced for his own team in the NASCAR Busch Series as an owner-driver, He first fielded the No. 16 Pontiac at 1982 Goody's 300, where he finished 18th.

==== Car No. 16 history ====
Year	Driver	No.	Make	1	2	3	4	5	6	7	8	9	10	11	12	13	14	15	16	17	18	19	20	21	22	23	24	25	26	27	28	29	Owners	Pts
1982	Mark Beard	16	Pontiac	DAY; 18	RCH	BRI	MAR	DAR	HCY	SBO	CRW	RCH	LGY	DOV	HCY	CLT	ASH	HCY	SBO	CAR	CRW	SBO	HCY	LGY	IRP	BRI	HCY	RCH	MAR	CLT	HCY	MAR		

=== Car No. 38 history ===
In 1986, Beard fielded the No. 38 Pontiac at Charlotte, where he finished 26th.

==== Car No. 38 history ====
Year	Driver	No.	Make	1	2	3	4	5	6	7	8	9	10	11	12	13	14	15	16	17	18	19	20	21	22	23	24	25	26	27	28	29	30	31	Owners	Pts
1986	Mark Beard	38	Pontiac	DAY	CAR	HCY	MAR	BRI	DAR	SBO	LGY	JFC	DOV	CLT; 26	SBO	HCY	ROU	IRP	SBO	RAL	OXF	SBO	HCY	LGY	ROU	BRI	DAR	RCH	DOV	MAR	ROU	CLT	CAR	MAR		

== ARCA Racing Series ==
=== Car No. 42 history ===
The owner of the oil business Beard Oil, Mark Beard revived Beard Motorsports in 2009 and began racing in ARCA with Clay Rogers behind the No. 42 Chevrolet; Beard acquired equipment from Hendrick Motorsports.

==== Car No. 42 results ====
Year	Driver	No.	Make	1	2	3	4	5	6	7	8	9	10	11	12	13	14	15	16	17	18	19	20	21	Owners	Pts
2009	Clay Rogers	42	Chevy	DAY	SLM	CAR	TAL	KEN	TOL	POC	MCH; 32	MFD	IOW	KEN	BLN	POC	ISF	CHI	TOL; 32	DSF	NJE	SLM	KAN	CAR		
2010	Clay Rogers	42	Chevy	DAY	PBE	SLM	TEX	TAL	TOL	POC	MCH; 34	IOW	MFD	POC	BLN	NJE	ISF	CHI	DSF	TOL	SLM	KAN	CAR			
2011	Clay Rogers	42	Chevy	DAY	TAL	SLM	TOL	NJE	CHI	POC	MCH; 26	WIN	BLN	IOW; 7	IRP	POC	ISF	MAD	DSF	SLM	KAN	TOL				
2012	Clay Rogers	42	Chevy	DAY	MOB	SLM	TAL	TOL; 7	ELK	POC	MCH	WIN	NJE	IOW	CHI	IRP	POC	BLN	ISF	MAD	SLM	DSF	KAN			

=== Car No. 45 history ===
The team fielded the No. 45 from 2011-2012 and scored a best finish of fourth at Iowa Speedway with Clay Rogers behind the wheel.

==== Car No. 45 results ====
Year	Driver	No.	Make	1	2	3	4	5	6	7	8	9	10	11	12	13	14	15	16	17	18	19	20	Owners	Pts
2011	Clay Rogers	45	Chevy	DAY	TAL	SLM	TOL	NJE	CHI	POC	MCH	WIN	BLN	IOW	IRP	POC	ISF	MAD	DSF	SLM	KAN; 30	TOL			
2012	Clay Rogers	45	Chevy	DAY	MOB	SLM	TAL	TOL	ELK	POC	MCH	WIN	NJE	IOW; 4	CHI	IRP; DNQ	POC	BLN	ISF	MAD	SLM	DSF	KAN		
