= 2026 Coke Zero Sugar 400 =

Race details
- Race 26 of 36 in the 2026 NASCAR Cup Series
- Date: August 29, 2026
- Location: Daytona International Speedway in Daytona Beach, Florida
- Course: Permanent racing facility
- Course length: 2.5 miles (4 km)
- Distance: 166 laps, 415 mi (664 km)
- Scheduled distance: 160 laps, 400 mi (640 km)
- Average speed: 154.69 miles per hour (248.95 km/h)

Pole position
Driver	Ross Chastain	Trackhouse Racing
- Time: 48.808

Most laps led
Driver	Austin Hill	Richard Childress Racing
- Laps: 27

Fastest lap
Driver	Noah Gragson	Front Row Motorsports
- Time: 45.353

Winner
No. 60	Ryan Preece	RFK Racing

Television in the United States
- Network: NBC
- Announcers: Leigh Diffey, Jeff Burton, Steve Letarte

Radio in the United States
- Radio: MRN
- Booth announcers: Alex Hayden, Mike Bagley, and Todd Gordon
- Turn announcers: Dave Moody (1 & 2), Kurt Becker (Backstretch), and Tim Catalfamo (3 & 4)

The 2026 Coke Zero Sugar 400 was a NASCAR Cup Series race held on August 29, 2026, at Daytona International Speedway in Daytona Beach, Florida. Contested over 166 laps on the 2.5-mile (4.0 km) superspeedway, extended from the original 160 laps due to an overtime finish, it was the 26th race of the 2026 NASCAR Cup Series season and the final race of the regular season.

Ryan Preece won the race for his first career series win in his 249th Cup Series race. Daniel Suárez finished 2nd, and Michael McDowell finished 3rd. Tyler Reddick and Ricky Stenhouse Jr. rounded out the top five, and Austin Cindric, Austin Dillon, Alex Bowman, Josh Berry, and Cole Custer rounded out the top ten. Preece's win gave him enough points to eclipse Shane van Gisbergen for the final spot in the Chase.

== Report ==
=== Background ===
Daytona International Speedway, the site of the race.

The race was held at Daytona International Speedway, a race track located in Daytona Beach, Florida, United States. Since opening in 1959, the track is the home of the Daytona 500, the most prestigious race in NASCAR. In addition to NASCAR, the track also hosts races of ARCA, AMA Superbike, USCC, SCCA, and Motocross. It features multiple layouts including the primary 2.5 miles (4.0 km) high speed tri-oval, a 3.56 miles (5.73 km) sports car course, a 2.95 miles (4.75 km) motorcycle course, and a .25 miles (0.40 km) karting and motorcycle flat-track. The track's 180-acre (73 ha) infield includes the 29-acre (12 ha) Lake Lloyd, which has hosted powerboat racing. The speedway is owned and operated by International Speedway Corporation.

The track was built in 1959 by NASCAR founder William "Bill" France, Sr. to host racing held at the former Daytona Beach Road Course. His banked design permitted higher speeds and gave fans a better view of the cars. Lights were installed around the track in 1998 and today, it is the third-largest single lit outdoor sports facility. The speedway has been renovated three times, with the infield renovated in 2004 and the track repaved twice — in 1978 and in 2010. On January 22, 2013, the track unveiled artist depictions of a renovated speedway. On July 5 of that year, ground was broken for a project that would remove the backstretch seating and completely redevelop the frontstretch seating. The renovation to the speedway is being worked on by Rossetti Architects. The project, named "Daytona Rising", was completed in January 2016, and it cost US $400 million, placing emphasis on improving fan experience with five expanded and redesigned fan entrances (called "injectors") as well as wider and more comfortable seating with more restrooms and concession stands. After the renovations, the track's grandstands include 101,000 permanent seats with the ability to increase permanent seating to 125,000. The project was completed before the start of Speedweeks.

==== Entry list ====
- (R) denotes rookie driver.
- (i) denotes driver who is ineligible for series driver points.

No.	Driver	Team	Manufacturer
1	Ross Chastain	Trackhouse Racing	Chevrolet
2	Austin Cindric	Team Penske	Ford
3	Austin Dillon	Richard Childress Racing	Chevrolet
4	Noah Gragson	Front Row Motorsports	Ford
5	Kyle Larson	Hendrick Motorsports	Chevrolet
6	Brad Keselowski	RFK Racing	Ford
7	Daniel Suárez	Spire Motorsports	Chevrolet
9	Chase Elliott	Hendrick Motorsports	Chevrolet
10	Ty Dillon	Kaulig Racing	Chevrolet
11	Denny Hamlin	Joe Gibbs Racing	Toyota
12	Ryan Blaney	Team Penske	Ford
16	A. J. Allmendinger	Kaulig Racing	Chevrolet
17	Chris Buescher	RFK Racing	Ford
19	Chase Briscoe	Joe Gibbs Racing	Toyota
20	Christopher Bell	Joe Gibbs Racing	Toyota
21	Josh Berry	Wood Brothers Racing	Ford
22	Joey Logano	Team Penske	Ford
23	Bubba Wallace	23XI Racing	Toyota
24	William Byron	Hendrick Motorsports	Chevrolet
33	Austin Hill (i)	Richard Childress Racing	Chevrolet
34	Todd Gilliland	Front Row Motorsports	Ford
35	Harrison Burton (i) (Note: Burton filled in for Riley Herbst, the usual driver of the No. 35, after Herbst experienced lingering effects from the prior weekend’s incident at New Hampshire.)	23XI Racing	Toyota
38	Zane Smith	Front Row Motorsports	Ford
41	Cole Custer	Haas Factory Team	Ford
42	John Hunter Nemechek	Legacy Motor Club	Toyota
43	Erik Jones	Legacy Motor Club	Toyota
44	Joey Gase (i)	NY Racing Team	Chevrolet
45	Tyler Reddick	23XI Racing	Toyota
47	Ricky Stenhouse Jr.	Hyak Motorsports	Chevrolet
48	Alex Bowman	Hendrick Motorsports	Chevrolet
51	Cody Ware	Rick Ware Racing	Ford
54	Ty Gibbs	Joe Gibbs Racing	Toyota
60	Ryan Preece	RFK Racing	Ford
62	Casey Mears	Beard Motorsports	Chevrolet
66	Gray Gaulding (i)	Garage 66	Ford
67	Corey Heim (i)	23XI Racing	Toyota
71	Michael McDowell	Spire Motorsports	Chevrolet
77	Carson Hocevar	Spire Motorsports	Chevrolet
78	Daniel Dye (i)	Live Fast Motorsports	Chevrolet
88	Connor Zilisch (R)	Trackhouse Racing	Chevrolet
97	Shane van Gisbergen	Trackhouse Racing	Chevrolet
Official entry list

== Qualifying ==
Ross Chastain scored the pole for the race with a time of 48.808 and a speed of 184.396 mph (296.757 km/h).

=== Qualifying results ===
Pos	No.	Driver	Team	Manufacturer	R1	R2
1	1	Ross Chastain	Trackhouse Racing	Chevrolet	48.958	48.808
2	17	Chris Buescher	RFK Racing	Ford	49.002	48.859
3	33	Austin Hill (i)	Richard Childress Racing	Chevrolet	48.955	48.863
4	60	Ryan Preece	RFK Racing	Ford	48.897	48.884
5	35	Riley Herbst	23XI Racing	Toyota	48.949	48.976
6	97	Shane van Gisbergen	Trackhouse Racing	Chevrolet	49.094	49.019
7	88	Connor Zilisch (R)	Trackhouse Racing	Chevrolet	49.046	49.020
8	2	Austin Cindric	Team Penske	Ford	49.095	49.071
9	22	Joey Logano	Team Penske	Ford	49.097	49.074
10	5	Kyle Larson	Hendrick Motorsports	Chevrolet	49.097	49.082
11	67	Corey Heim (i)	23XI Racing	Toyota	49.101	—
12	19	Chase Briscoe	Joe Gibbs Racing	Toyota	49.104	—
13	24	William Byron	Hendrick Motorsports	Chevrolet	49.117	—
14	54	Ty Gibbs	Joe Gibbs Racing	Toyota	49.123	—
15	43	Erik Jones	Legacy Motor Club	Toyota	49.140	—
16	41	Cole Custer	Haas Factory Team	Chevrolet	49.144	—
17	45	Tyler Reddick	23XI Racing	Toyota	49.145	—
18	71	Michael McDowell	Spire Motorsports	Chevrolet	49.149	—
19	12	Ryan Blaney	Team Penske	Ford	49.154	—
20	48	Alex Bowman	Hendrick Motorsports	Chevrolet	49.176	—
21	6	Brad Keselowski	RFK Racing	Ford	49.204	—
22	9	Chase Elliott	Hendrick Motorsports	Chevrolet	49.232	—
23	7	Daniel Suárez	Spire Motorsports	Chevrolet	49.240	—
24	21	Josh Berry	Wood Brothers Racing	Ford	49.282	—
25	51	Cody Ware	Rick Ware Racing	Chevrolet	49.302	—
26	23	Bubba Wallace	23XI Racing	Toyota	49.330	—
27	42	John Hunter Nemechek	Legacy Motor Club	Toyota	49.335	—
28	77	Carson Hocevar	Spire Motorsports	Chevrolet	49.336	—
29	3	Austin Dillon	Richard Childress Racing	Chevrolet	49.343	—
30	11	Denny Hamlin	Joe Gibbs Racing	Toyota	49.360	—
31	10	Ty Dillon	Kaulig Racing	Chevrolet	49.361	—
32	47	Ricky Stenhouse Jr.	Hyak Motorsports	Chevrolet	49.375	—
33	34	Todd Gilliland	Front Row Motorsports	Ford	49.388	—
34	38	Zane Smith	Front Row Motorsports	Ford	49.402	—
35	20	Christopher Bell	Joe Gibbs Racing	Toyota	49.485	—
36	16	A. J. Allmendinger	Kaulig Racing	Chevrolet	49.485	—
37	4	Noah Gragson	Front Row Motorsports	Ford	49.500	—
38	62	Casey Mears	Beard Motorsports	Chevrolet	49.520	—
39	78	Daniel Dye (i)	Live Fast Motorsports	Chevrolet	49.555	—
40	44	Joey Gase (i)	NY Racing Team	Chevrolet	49.933	—
Did Not Qualify
41	66	Gray Gaulding (i)	Garage 66	Ford	50.058	—
Official qualifying results

== Race ==
=== Race results ===
==== Stage results ====
Stage One Laps: 35

Pos	No	Driver	Team	Manufacturer	Points
1	97	Shane van Gisbergen	Trackhouse Racing	Chevrolet	10
2	54	Ty Gibbs	Joe Gibbs Racing	Toyota	9
3	22	Joey Logano	Team Penske	Ford	8
4	43	Erik Jones	Legacy Motor Club	Toyota	7
5	19	Chase Briscoe	Joe Gibbs Racing	Toyota	6
6	5	Kyle Larson	Hendrick Motorsports	Chevrolet	5
7	23	Bubba Wallace	23XI Racing	Toyota	4
8	60	Ryan Preece	RFK Racing	Ford	3
9	42	John Hunter Nemechek	Legacy Motor Club	Toyota	2
10	2	Austin Cindric	Team Penske	Ford	1

Stage Two Laps: 60

Pos	No	Driver	Team	Manufacturer	Points
1	12	Ryan Blaney	Team Penske	Ford	10
2	60	Ryan Preece	RFK Racing	Ford	9
3	38	Zane Smith	Front Row Motorsports	Ford	8
4	24	William Byron	Hendrick Motorsports	Chevrolet	7
5	34	Todd Gilliland	Front Row Motorsports	Ford	6
6	5	Kyle Larson	Hendrick Motorsports	Chevrolet	5
7	19	Chase Briscoe	Joe Gibbs Racing	Toyota	4
8	7	Daniel Suárez	Spire Motorsports	Chevrolet	3
9	9	Chase Elliott	Hendrick Motorsports	Chevrolet	2
10	33	Austin Hill (i)	Richard Childress Racing	Chevrolet	0

=== Final Stage results ===
Stage Three Laps: 65

Pos	Grid	No	Driver	Team	Manufacturer	Laps	Points
1	4	60	Ryan Preece	RFK Racing	Ford	166	67
2	23	7	Daniel Suárez	Spire Motorsports	Chevrolet	166	38
3	17	45	Tyler Reddick	23XI Racing	Toyota	166	34
4	18	71	Michael McDowell	Spire Motorsports	Chevrolet	166	33
5	32	47	Ricky Stenhouse Jr.	Hyak Motorsports	Chevrolet	166	32
6	8	2	Austin Cindric	Team Penske	Ford	166	32
7	29	3	Austin Dillon	Richard Childress Racing	Chevrolet	166	30
8	20	48	Alex Bowman	Hendrick Motorsports	Chevrolet	166	29
9	24	21	Josh Berry	Wood Brothers Racing	Chevrolet	166	28
10	16	41	Cole Custer	Haas Factory Team	Chevrolet	166	27
11	30	11	Denny Hamlin	Joe Gibbs Racing	Toyota	166	26
12	5	35	Harrison Burton (i)	23XI Racing	Toyota	166	0
13	12	19	Chase Briscoe	Joe Gibbs Racing	Toyota	166	34
14	21	6	Brad Keselowski	RFK Racing	Ford	166	23
15	27	42	John Hunter Nemechek	Legacy Motor Club	Toyota	166	24
16	11	67	Corey Heim (i)	23XI Racing	Toyota	166	0
17	35	20	Christopher Bell	Joe Gibbs Racing	Toyota	166	20
18	9	22	Joey Logano	Team Penske	Ford	166	27
19	33	34	Todd Gilliland	Front Row Motorsports	Ford	166	24
20	26	23	Bubba Wallace	23XI Racing	Toyota	166	21
21	31	10	Ty Dillon	Kaulig Racing	Chevrolet	166	16
22	13	24	William Byron	Hendrick Motorsports	Chevrolet	166	22
23	22	9	Chase Elliott	Hendrick Motorsports	Chevrolet	166	16
24	1	1	Ross Chastain	Trackhouse Racing	Chevrolet	166	13
25	7	88	Connor Zilisch (R)	Trackhouse Racing	Chevrolet	166	12
26	37	4	Noah Gragson	Front Row Motorsports	Ford	166	12
27	3	33	Austin Hill (i)	Richard Childress Racing	Chevrolet	166	0
28	6	97	Shane van Gisbergen	Trackhouse Racing	Chevrolet	166	19
29	39	78	Daniel Dye (i)	Live Fast Motorsports	Chevrolet	166	0
30	36	16	A. J. Allmendinger	Kaulig Racing	Chevrolet	166	7
31	10	5	Kyle Larson	Hendrick Motorsports	Chevrolet	166	16
32	34	38	Zane Smith	Front Row Motorsports	Ford	165	13
33	19	12	Ryan Blaney	Team Penske	Ford	165	14
34	14	54	Ty Gibbs	Joe Gibbs Racing	Toyota	165	12
35	25	51	Cody Ware	Rick Ware Racing	Chevrolet	165	2
36	40	44	Joey Gase (i)	NY Racing Team	Chevrolet	165	0
37	38	62	Casey Mears	Beard Motorsports	Chevrolet	165	1
38	28	77	Carson Hocevar	Spire Motorsports	Chevrolet	154	1
39	15	43	Erik Jones	Legacy Motor Club	Toyota	154	1
40	2	17	Chris Buescher	RFK Racing	Ford	151	1
Official race results

=== Race statistics ===
- Lead changes: 41 among 22 different drivers
- Cautions/Laps: 4 for 23
- Red flags: 0
- Time of race: 2 hours, 40 minutes, and 58 seconds
- Average speed: 154.69 miles per hour (248.95 km/h)

== Media ==
=== Television ===
NBC covered the race on the television side. Leigh Diffey, 2000 Coke Zero 400 winner Jeff Burton and Steve Letarte called the race from the broadcast booth. Dave Burns, Kim Coon, and Marty Snider handled pit road, while Trevor Bayne provided analysis from the pace car for the television side.

NBC
Booth announcers	Pit reporters	Pace car
Lap-by-lap: Leigh Diffey; Color-commentator: Jeff Burton; Color-commentator: Steve Letarte	Dave Burns; Kim Coon; Marty Snider	Trevor Bayne

=== Radio ===
MRN had the radio call for the race, which was also simulcast on Sirius XM NASCAR Radio. Alex Hayden, Mike Bagley, and former championship crew chief Todd Gordon called the action for MRN when the field races thru the front straightaway. Dave Moody called the action for MRN from atop the Sunoco tower outside the exit of turn 2 when the field races thru turns 1 & 2. Kyle Rickey worked the Daytona Backstretch for MRN from a spotter's stand in the inside of the track. Tim Catalfamo worked the action for MRN when the field races thru turns 3 & 4. Pit road was operated by lead pit reporter Steve Post, Alex Weaver, and Chris Wilner.

MRN
Booth announcers	Turn announcers	Pit reporters
Lead announcer: Alex Hayden; Announcer: Mike Bagley; Announcer: Todd Gordon	Turns 1 & 2: Dave Moody; Backstretch: Kurt Becker; Turns 3 & 4: Tim Catalfamo	Steve Post; Alex Weaver; Chris Wilner

== Standings after the race ==
Drivers' Championship standings

	Pos	Driver	Points
	1	Denny Hamlin	2,100
	2	Ryan Blaney	2,075 (–25)
1	3	Tyler Reddick	2,065 (–35)
1	4	Ty Gibbs	2,060 (–40)
1	5	Chase Briscoe	2,055 (–45)
1	6	Christopher Bell	2,050 (–50)
	7	Kyle Larson	2,045 (–55)
	8	Chase Elliott	2,040 (–60)
	9	Joey Logano	2,035 (–65)
	10	Chris Buescher	2,030 (–70)
2	11	Daniel Suárez	2,025 (–75)
1	12	Carson Hocevar	2,020 (–80)
1	13	William Byron	2,015 (–85)
	14	Bubba Wallace	2,010 (–90)
	15	Austin Cindric	2,005 (–95)
1	16	Ryan Preece	2,000 (–100)
Official driver's standings

Manufacturers' Championship standings

Pos	Manufacturer	Points
1	Toyota	1,174
2	Chevrolet	995 (–179)
3	Ford	965 (–209)

- Note: Only the first 16 positions are included for the driver standings.

== Notes ==
Previous race: 2026 Dollar Tree 301	NASCAR Cup Series; 2026 season	Next race: 2026 Cook Out Southern 500
