= 2026 Jack Link's 500 =

NASCAR Cup Series race

Race details
- Race 10 of 36 in the 2026 NASCAR Cup Series
- Date: April 26, 2026
- Location: Talladega Superspeedway in Lincoln, Alabama
- Course: Permanent racing facility
- Course length: 2.66 miles (4.28 km)
- Distance: 188 laps, 500.08 mi (804.64 km)
- Weather: Partly cloudy 81 °F (27 °C)
- Average speed: 147.504 miles per hour (237.385 km/h)

Pole position
Driver	Tyler Reddick	23XI Racing
- Grid positions set by competition-based formula

Most laps led
Driver	Christopher Bell	Joe Gibbs Racing
- Laps: 31

Fastest lap
Driver	Zane Smith	Front Row Motorsports
- Time: 48.263

Winner
No. 77	Carson Hocevar	Spire Motorsports

Television in the United States
- Network: Fox
- Announcers: Mike Joy, Clint Bowyer, and Kevin Harvick
- Nielsen ratings: 2.11 (3.967 million)

Radio in the United States
- Radio: MRN
- Booth announcers: Alex Hayden, Mike Bagley, and Todd Gordon
- Turn announcers: Dave Moody (1 & 2), Tim Catalfamo (Backstretch), and Dan Hubbard (3 & 4)

The 2026 Jack Link's 500 was an NASCAR Cup Series race that was held on April 26, 2026, at Talladega Superspeedway in Lincoln, Alabama. Contested over 188 laps on the 2.66 mile (4.28 km) superspeedway, it was the 10th race of the 2026 NASCAR Cup Series season.

Carson Hocevar won the race for his first career Cup Series win. Chris Buescher finished 2nd, and Alex Bowman finished 3rd. Chase Elliott and Zane Smith rounded out the top five, and Ricky Stenhouse Jr., Ross Chastain, Austin Cindric, Noah Gragson, and Kyle Busch rounded out the top ten.

== Report ==
=== Background ===
Talladega Superspeedway, the track where the race was held.

Talladega Superspeedway, formerly known as Alabama International Motor Speedway, is a motorsports complex located north of Talladega, Alabama. It is located on the former Anniston Air Force Base in the small city of Lincoln. A tri-oval, the track was constructed in 1969 by the International Speedway Corporation, a business controlled by the France family. Talladega is most known for its steep banking. The track currently hosts NASCAR's Cup Series, Xfinity Series and Craftsman Truck Series. Talladega is the longest NASCAR oval with a length of 2.66-mile-long (4.28 km) tri-oval like the Daytona International Speedway, which is 2.5-mile-long (4.0 km).

On October 4, 2024, Jack Link's was announced as the title sponsor for the race, ending an 11-year run by its predecessor, GEICO.

==== Entry list ====
- (R) denotes rookie driver.
- (i) denotes driver who is ineligible for series driver points.

No.	Driver	Team	Manufacturer
1	Ross Chastain	Trackhouse Racing	Chevrolet
2	Austin Cindric	Team Penske	Ford
3	Austin Dillon	Richard Childress Racing	Chevrolet
4	Noah Gragson	Front Row Motorsports	Ford
5	Kyle Larson	Hendrick Motorsports	Chevrolet
6	Brad Keselowski	RFK Racing	Ford
7	Daniel Suárez	Spire Motorsports	Chevrolet
8	Kyle Busch	Richard Childress Racing	Chevrolet
9	Chase Elliott	Hendrick Motorsports	Chevrolet
10	Ty Dillon	Kaulig Racing	Chevrolet
11	Denny Hamlin	Joe Gibbs Racing	Toyota
12	Ryan Blaney	Team Penske	Ford
16	A. J. Allmendinger	Kaulig Racing	Chevrolet
17	Chris Buescher	RFK Racing	Ford
19	Chase Briscoe	Joe Gibbs Racing	Toyota
20	Christopher Bell	Joe Gibbs Racing	Toyota
21	Josh Berry	Wood Brothers Racing	Ford
22	Joey Logano	Team Penske	Ford
23	Bubba Wallace	23XI Racing	Toyota
24	William Byron	Hendrick Motorsports	Chevrolet
33	Jesse Love (i)	Richard Childress Racing	Chevrolet
34	Todd Gilliland	Front Row Motorsports	Ford
35	Riley Herbst	23XI Racing	Toyota
38	Zane Smith	Front Row Motorsports	Ford
41	Cole Custer	Haas Factory Team	Chevrolet
42	John Hunter Nemechek	Legacy Motor Club	Toyota
43	Erik Jones	Legacy Motor Club	Toyota
44	Joey Gase (i)	NY Racing Team	Chevrolet
45	Tyler Reddick	23XI Racing	Toyota
47	Ricky Stenhouse Jr.	Hyak Motorsports	Chevrolet
48	Alex Bowman	Hendrick Motorsports	Chevrolet
51	Cody Ware	Rick Ware Racing	Chevrolet
54	Ty Gibbs	Joe Gibbs Racing	Toyota
60	Ryan Preece	RFK Racing	Ford
62	Casey Mears	Beard Motorsports	Chevrolet
66	Chad Finchum (i)	MBM Motorsports	Ford
71	Michael McDowell	Spire Motorsports	Chevrolet
77	Carson Hocevar	Spire Motorsports	Chevrolet
78	Daniel Dye (i)	Live Fast Motorsports	Chevrolet
88	Connor Zilisch (R)	Trackhouse Racing	Chevrolet
97	Shane van Gisbergen	Trackhouse Racing	Chevrolet
Official entry list

== Qualifying ==
Qualifying for the race was canceled due to inclement weather. Tyler Reddick was awarded the pole for the race as a result of NASCAR's pandemic formula with a score of 1.000.

=== Starting lineup ===
Pos	No.	Driver	Team	Manufacturer
1	45	Tyler Reddick	23XI Racing	Toyota
2	5	Kyle Larson	Hendrick Motorsports	Chevrolet
3	11	Denny Hamlin	Joe Gibbs Racing	Toyota
4	23	Bubba Wallace	23XI Racing	Toyota
5	19	Chase Briscoe	Joe Gibbs Racing	Toyota
6	6	Brad Keselowski	RFK Racing	Ford
7	24	William Byron	Hendrick Motorsports	Chevrolet
8	9	Chase Elliott	Hendrick Motorsports	Chevrolet
9	54	Ty Gibbs	Joe Gibbs Racing	Toyota
10	17	Chris Buescher	RFK Racing	Ford
11	60	Ryan Preece	RFK Racing	Ford
12	77	Carson Hocevar	Spire Motorsports	Chevrolet
13	2	Austin Cindric	Team Penske	Ford
14	20	Christopher Bell	Joe Gibbs Racing	Toyota
15	12	Ryan Blaney	Team Penske	Ford
16	7	Daniel Suárez	Spire Motorsports	Chevrolet
17	35	Riley Herbst	23XI Racing	Toyota
18	3	Austin Dillon	Richard Childress Racing	Chevrolet
19	34	Todd Gilliland	Front Row Motorsports	Ford
20	48	Alex Bowman	Hendrick Motorsports	Chevrolet
21	43	Erik Jones	Legacy Motor Club	Toyota
22	47	Ricky Stenhouse Jr.	Hyak Motorsports	Chevrolet
23	42	John Hunter Nemechek	Legacy Motor Club	Toyota
24	1	Ross Chastain	Trackhouse Racing	Chevrolet
25	22	Joey Logano	Team Penske	Ford
26	21	Josh Berry	Wood Brothers Racing	Ford
27	41	Cole Custer	Haas Factory Team	Chevrolet
28	16	A. J. Allmendinger	Kaulig Racing	Chevrolet
29	4	Noah Gragson	Front Row Motorsports	Ford
30	38	Zane Smith	Front Row Motorsports	Ford
31	71	Michael McDowell	Spire Motorsports	Chevrolet
32	88	Connor Zilisch (R)	Trackhouse Racing	Chevrolet
33	97	Shane van Gisbergen	Trackhouse Racing	Chevrolet
34	8	Kyle Busch	Richard Childress Racing	Chevrolet
35	10	Ty Dillon	Kaulig Racing	Chevrolet
36	51	Cody Ware	Rick Ware Racing	Chevrolet
37	33	Jesse Love (i)	Richard Childress Racing	Chevrolet
38	66	Chad Finchum (i)	Garage 66	Ford
39	44	Joey Gase (i)	NY Racing Team	Chevrolet
40	78	Daniel Dye (i)	Live Fast Motorsports	Chevrolet
Did not qualify
41	62	Casey Mears	Beard Motorsports	Chevrolet
Official starting lineup

== Race ==
The race was red-flagged on lap 116 as a result of a 27-car crash that occurred on the backstretch into turn 3.

=== Race results ===
==== Stage Results ====
Stage One Laps: 98

Pos	No	Driver	Team	Manufacturer	Points
1	60	Ryan Preece	RFK Racing	Ford	10
2	6	Brad Keselowski	RFK Racing	Ford	9
3	22	Joey Logano	Team Penske	Ford	8
4	17	Chris Buescher	RFK Racing	Ford	7
5	12	Ryan Blaney	Team Penske	Ford	6
6	21	Josh Berry	Wood Brothers Racing	Ford	5
7	45	Tyler Reddick	23XI Racing	Toyota	4
8	4	Noah Gragson	Front Row Motorsports	Ford	3
9	34	Todd Gilliland	Front Row Motorsports	Ford	2
10	1	Ross Chastain	Trackhouse Racing	Chevrolet	1

Stage Two Laps: 45

Pos	No	Driver	Team	Manufacturer	Points
1	1	Ross Chastain	Trackhouse Racing	Chevrolet	10
2	20	Christopher Bell	Joe Gibbs Racing	Toyota	9
3	17	Chris Buescher	RFK Racing	Ford	8
4	47	Ricky Stenhouse Jr.	Hyak Motorsports	Chevrolet	7
5	34	Todd Gilliland	Front Row Motorsports	Ford	6
6	60	Ryan Preece	RFK Racing	Ford	5
7	51	Cody Ware	Rick Ware Racing	Chevrolet	4
8	48	Alex Bowman	Hendrick Motorsports	Chevrolet	3
9	9	Chase Elliott	Hendrick Motorsports	Chevrolet	2
10	38	Zane Smith	Front Row Motorsports	Ford	1

=== Final Stage Results ===
Stage Three Laps: 45

Pos	Grid	No	Driver	Team	Manufacturer	Laps	Points
1	12	77	Carson Hocevar	Spire Motorsports	Chevrolet	188	55
2	10	17	Chris Buescher	RFK Racing	Ford	188	50
3	20	48	Alex Bowman	Hendrick Motorsports	Chevrolet	188	37
4	8	9	Chase Elliott	Hendrick Motorsports	Chevrolet	188	35
5	30	38	Zane Smith	Front Row Motorsports	Ford	188	34
6	22	47	Ricky Stenhouse Jr.	Hyak Motorsports	Chevrolet	188	38
7	24	1	Ross Chastain	Trackhouse Racing	Chevrolet	188	41
8	13	2	Austin Cindric	Team Penske	Ford	188	29
9	29	4	Noah Gragson	Front Row Motorsports	Ford	188	31
10	34	8	Kyle Busch	Richard Childress Racing	Chevrolet	188	27
11	19	34	Todd Gilliland	Front Row Motorsports	Ford	188	34
12	16	7	Daniel Suárez	Spire Motorsports	Chevrolet	188	25
13	35	10	Ty Dillon	Kaulig Racing	Chevrolet	188	24
14	1	45	Tyler Reddick	23XI Racing	Toyota	188	27
15	3	11	Denny Hamlin	Joe Gibbs Racing	Toyota	188	22
16	28	16	A. J. Allmendinger	Kaulig Racing	Chevrolet	188	21
17	14	20	Christopher Bell	Joe Gibbs Racing	Toyota	188	29
18	11	60	Ryan Preece	RFK Racing	Ford	188	34
19	18	3	Austin Dillon	Richard Childress Racing	Chevrolet	188	18
20	33	97	Shane van Gisbergen	Trackhouse Racing	Chevrolet	188	17
21	36	51	Cody Ware	Rick Ware Racing	Chevrolet	188	20
22	23	42	John Hunter Nemechek	Legacy Motor Club	Toyota	187	15
23	21	43	Erik Jones	Legacy Motor Club	Toyota	187	14
24	40	78	Daniel Dye (i)	Live Fast Motorsports	Chevrolet	186	0
25	17	35	Riley Herbst	23XI Racing	Toyota	186	12
26	32	88	Connor Zilisch (R)	Trackhouse Racing	Chevrolet	185	11
27	37	33	Jesse Love (i)	Richard Childress Racing	Chevrolet	185	0
28	38	66	Chad Finchum (i)	Garage 66	Ford	182	0
29	5	19	Chase Briscoe	Joe Gibbs Racing	Toyota	180	8
30	39	44	Joey Gase (i)	NY Racing Team	Chevrolet	177	0
31	6	6	Brad Keselowski	RFK Racing	Ford	166	15
32	31	71	Michael McDowell	Spire Motorsports	Chevrolet	149	5
33	26	21	Josh Berry	Wood Brothers Racing	Ford	124	9
34	9	54	Ty Gibbs	Joe Gibbs Racing	Toyota	122	3
35	7	24	William Byron	Hendrick Motorsports	Chevrolet	119	2
36	4	23	Bubba Wallace	23XI Racing	Toyota	114	1
37	15	12	Ryan Blaney	Team Penske	Ford	114	7
38	27	41	Cole Custer	Haas Factory Team	Chevrolet	114	1
39	25	22	Joey Logano	Team Penske	Ford	114	9
40	2	5	Kyle Larson	Hendrick Motorsports	Chevrolet	114	1
Official race results

=== Race statistics ===
- Lead changes: 52 among 16 different drivers
- Cautions/Laps: 6 for 30 laps
- Red flags: 1 for wreck clean up (9 minutes, 58 seconds)
- Time of race: 3 hours, 23 minutes and 25 seconds
- Average speed: 147.504 miles per hour (237.385 km/h)
- Margin of victory: 0.114 seconds

== Media ==
=== Television ===
Fox Sports covered their 26th race at the Talladega Superspeedway. Mike Joy, Clint Bowyer, and 2010 spring Talladega winner Kevin Harvick called the race from the broadcast booth. Jamie Little, Regan Smith, and Josh Sims handled pit road for the television side, and Larry McReynolds provided insight on-site during the race.

Fox
Booth announcers	Pit reporters	In-race analyst
Lap-by-lap: Mike Joy; Color-commentator: Clint Bowyer; Color-commentator: Kevin Harvick	Jamie Little; Regan Smith; Josh Sims	Larry McReynolds

=== Radio ===
MRN had the radio call for the race which was also simulcasted on Sirius XM NASCAR Radio. Alex Hayden, Mike Bagley, and former championship winning crew chief Todd Gordon called the race in the booth when the field raced through the tri-oval. Dave Moody called the race from the Sunoco spotters stand outside turn 2 when the field raced through turns 1 and 2. Tim Catalfamo will call the race from a platform inside the backstretch when the field raced down the backstretch and Dan Hubbard called the race from the Sunoco spotters stand outside turn 4 when the field raced through turns 3 and 4. Steve Post, Chris Wilner, Jason Toy, and Jacklyn Drake worked pit road for the radio side for MRN.

MRN Radio
Booth announcers	Turn announcers	Pit reporters
Lead announcer: Alex Hayden; Announcer: Mike Bagley; Announcer: Todd Gordon	Turns 1 & 2: Dave Moody; Backstretch: Tim Catalfamo; Turns 3 & 4: Dan Hubbard	Steve Post; Chris Wilner; Jason Toy; Jacklyn Drake

== Standings after the race ==
Drivers' Championship standings

	Pos	Driver	Points
	1	Tyler Reddick	484
	2	Denny Hamlin	374 (–110)
	3	Ryan Blaney	344 (–140)
2	4	Chase Elliott	340 (–144)
1	5	Ty Gibbs	322 (–162)
1	6	Kyle Larson	315 (–169)
4	7	Chris Buescher	309 (–175)
4	8	Carson Hocevar	292 (–192)
1	9	Christopher Bell	286 (–198)
1	10	Brad Keselowski	279 (–205)
4	11	William Byron	277 (–207)
4	12	Bubba Wallace	276 (–208)
	13	Ryan Preece	270 (–214)
2	14	Daniel Suárez	235 (–249)
1	15	Joey Logano	234 (–250)
1	16	Austin Cindric	226 (–258)
Official driver's standings

Manufacturers' Championship standings

Pos	Manufacturer	Points
1	Toyota	478
2	Chevrolet	385 (–93)
3	Ford	349 (–129)

- Note: Only the first 16 positions are included for the driver standings.

Previous race: 2026 AdventHealth 400	NASCAR Cup Series; 2026 season	Next race: 2026 Würth 400
