= Clay Rogers =

American stock car racing driver

- Rodgers winning the 2012 UARA-Stars finale at Rockingham Speedway.
- Born: Clayton Rogers; November 6, 1980 (age 46); Mooresville, North Carolina, U.S.
- Achievements: 2004 USAR Hooters Pro Cup Series Champion 2006 USAR Hooters Pro Cup Series Champion; 2009 USA Racing Pro Cup Series Champion; 2010 USA Racing Pro Cup Series Champion; 2013 CARS X-1R Pro Cup Series Champion 2006 Snowball Derby Winner

NASCAR Cup Series career
- 2 races run over 1 year
- 2014 position: 56th
- Best finish: 56th (2014)
- First race: 2014 Sylvania 300 (Loudon)
- Last race: 2014 Goody's Headache Relief Shot 500 (Martinsville)
Wins	Top tens	Poles
0	0	0

NASCAR O'Reilly Auto Parts Series career
- 12 races run over 2 years
- Best finish: 49th (2001)
- First race: 2001 Alltel 200 (Rockingham)
- Last race: 2005 Ford 300 (Homestead)
Wins	Top tens	Poles
0	0	0

NASCAR FedEx Freight Truck Series career
- 36 races run over 5 years
- 2013 position: 67th
- Best finish: 20th (2011)
- First race: 2005 Quaker Steak and Lube 200 (Charlotte)
- Last race: 2013 North Carolina Education Lottery 200 (The Rock)
Wins	Top tens	Poles
0	3	0
- Statistics up to date as of October 26, 2014.

Clayton Rogers (born November 6, 1980) is an American professional stock car racing driver. He has competed in the NASCAR Sprint Cup Series, Nationwide Series and Camping World Truck Series, and is the 2004, 2006, 2009, and 2010 champion in the USARacing Pro Cup Series.

== Early career ==
Rogers began racing at the age of eight in go-karts. When he was ten years old, he won his first race at Two Flags Speedway. The next season, he won his first of two championships in the World Karting Association. He then competed in the Allison Legacy Series in 1997. In 1998, Rogers began racing at Concord Motorsports Park in the NASCAR Winston Racing Series. He finished second in the overall championship standings and was named Rookie of the Year. He first competed in USAR in 2000, winning once and finishing in the top-ten eleven times. In 2006, he won one of the most prestigious short track races in the country, The Snowball Derby. Rogers returned to the USAR for 2009 and won back to back championships.

== NASCAR career ==
Rogers made his NASCAR debut in the Busch Series in 2001. He drove the No. 17 Chevrolet Monte Carlo owned by Robbie Reiser for nine races, sharing the ride with Matt Kenseth. His best finish that season came at Memphis Motorsports Park, where he finished twelfth.

After a four-year absence from NASCAR, Rogers returned to series competition in 2005 in NASCAR Craftsman Truck Series. He began in the Truck Series, driving the No. 44 Ford F-150 for Tom Baird. He made one start for Baird at Lowe's Motor Speedway, where he finished fourteenth. He then signed to drive the No. 65 Glynn Motorsports Dodge Ram, where he finished eighth in his first start with the team. He drove four more races for the team that season, his best finish coming in his last race at New Hampshire International Speedway, where he finished fourth.

Rogers competed in three Busch Series races in 2005 as well. He made his season debut at Bristol Motor Speedway, finishing 43rd after wrecking his No. 91 Dodge Intrepid. He completed the season driving in a pair of races for Glynn, his best finish coming at the season-ending Ford 300, where he drove the No. 58 Who's Your Daddy? Dodge to a fourteenth place finish. After Glynn ceased operations at the end of the year, Rogers returned to USAR and won the Southern Division championship. He returned return to the Truck Series to race the No. 40 Key Motorsports truck on a part-time basis.

Rogers competed in the USAR Hooters Pro Cup in 2006, and he won the series championship.

After a three-year absence from NASCAR, Rogers returned to the Camping World Truck Series. Rogers ran the majority of the 2011 NASCAR Camping World Truck Series season in the No. 92 RBR Enterprises Chevrolet. Rogers finished a surprise third in the season opening NextEra Energy Resources 250 at Daytona to Michael Waltrip and Elliott Sadler and was the points leader after Daytona, winding up finishing twentieth in series points for the season.

In 2014, Rogers was possibly set to attempt to qualify for his Sprint Cup Series debut at New Hampshire driving the No. 75 Chevrolet for Beard Motorsports, but the team withdrew at the last second from the entry list. Rogers attempted to qualify at the Federated Auto Parts 400 at Richmond. However, Rogers failed to qualify. Rogers later joined BK Racing in the No. 93 for the Sylvania 300 at Loudon. Rogers ran the 93 again at Martinsville. He and Beard reunited at Phoenix to attempt the No. 75 a second time, but failed to qualify again.

== Motorsports career results ==
=== NASCAR ===
(key) (Bold – Pole position awarded by qualifying time. Italics – Pole position earned by points standings or practice time. * – Most laps led.)

==== Sprint Cup Series ====
NASCAR Sprint Cup Series results
Year	Team	No.	Make	1	2	3	4	5	6	7	8	9	10	11	12	13	14	15	16	17	18	19	20	21	22	23	24	25	26	27	28	29	30	31	32	33	34	35	36	NSCC	Pts	Ref
2014	Beard Motorsports	75	Chevy	DAY	PHO	LVS	BRI	CAL	MAR	TEX	DAR	RCH	TAL	KAN	CLT	DOV	POC	MCH	SON	KEN	DAY	NHA	IND	POC	GLN	MCH	BRI	ATL	RCH; DNQ	CHI								PHO; DNQ	HOM	56th	2	
2014	BK Racing	93	Toyota																												NHA; 43	DOV	KAN	CLT	TAL	MAR; 43	TEX			56th	2	

==== Busch Series ====
NASCAR Busch Series results
Year	Team	No.	Make	1	2	3	4	5	6	7	8	9	10	11	12	13	14	15	16	17	18	19	20	21	22	23	24	25	26	27	28	29	30	31	32	33	34	35	NBSC	Pts	Ref
2001	Reiser Enterprises	17	Chevy	DAY	CAR; 18	LVS	ATL	DAR	BRI	TEX	NSH; 37	TAL	CAL	RCH	NHA; 37	NZH; 23	CLT	DOV	KEN; 39	MLW	GLN	CHI	GTY; 34	PPR; 35	IRP; 30	MCH	BRI	DAR	RCH	DOV	KAN	CLT	MEM; 12	PHO	CAR	HOM			49th	677	
2005	TommyRaz Motorsports	91	Dodge	DAY	CAL	MXC	LVS	ATL	NSH	BRI	TEX	PHO	TAL	DAR	RCH	CLT	DOV	NSH	KEN	MLW	DAY	CHI	NHA	PPR	GTY	IRP	GLN	MCH	BRI; 43	CAL	RCH	DOV	KAN	CLT	MEM	TEX			91st	213	
2005	Glynn Motorsports	92	Dodge																																		PHO; 35		91st	213	
2005	Glynn Motorsports	58	Dodge																																			HOM; 14	91st	213	

==== Camping World Truck Series ====
NASCAR Camping World Truck Series results
Year	Team	No.	Make	1	2	3	4	5	6	7	8	9	10	11	12	13	14	15	16	17	18	19	20	21	22	23	24	25	NCWTC	Pts	Ref
2005	Troy Baird	44	Ford	DAY	CAL	ATL	MAR	GTY	MFD	CLT; 14	DOV							IRP; DNQ	NSH	BRI					ATL; DNQ	TEX	PHO	HOM	34th	723	
2005	Glynn Motorsports	65	Dodge									TEX; 8	MCH; 26	MLW	KAN; 25	KEN	MEM				RCH; 12	NHA; 4	LVS	MAR					34th	723	
2007	Key Motorsports	40	Chevy	DAY	CAL	ATL	MAR	KAN; 21		MFD; 16	DOV	TEX; 25	MCH; 25	MLW	MEM	KEN	IRP	NSH	BRI	GTW									30th	1237	
2007	Team Racing	86	Chevy						CLT; 33																				30th	1237	
2007	Spears Motorsports	75	Chevy																		NHA; 12	LVS; 11	TAL; 15	MAR; 26	ATL; 34	TEX; 33	PHO; 16	HOM; 27	30th	1237	
2009	DGM Racing	72	Chevy	DAY	CAL	ATL; 36	MAR	KAN	CLT	DOV	TEX	MCH	MLW	MEM	KEN	IRP	NSH	BRI	CHI	IOW	GTW	NHA	LVS	MAR	TAL	TEX	PHO	HOM	110th	55	
2011	RBR Enterprises	92	Chevy	DAY; 3	PHO; 16	DAR; 11	MAR; 16	NSH; 31	DOV; 20	CLT; 17	KAN; 28	TEX; 25	KEN; 17	IOW; 17	NSH	IRP; 15	POC	MCH	BRI; 14	ATL	CHI	NHA	KEN; 16	LVS	TAL	MAR; 24	TEX	HOM	20th	391	
2013	RBR Enterprises	92	Chevy	DAY	MAR	CAR; 25	KAN	CLT	DOV	TEX	KEN	IOW	ELD	POC	MCH	BRI	MSP	IOW	CHI	LVS	TAL	MAR	TEX	PHO	HOM				67th	19	

=== ARCA Racing Series ===
(key) (Bold – Pole position awarded by qualifying time. Italics – Pole position earned by points standings or practice time. * – Most laps led.)

ARCA Racing Series results
Year	Team	No.	Make	1	2	3	4	5	6	7	8	9	10	11	12	13	14	15	16	17	18	19	20	21	22	ARSC	Pts	Ref
2003	Bob Schacht Motorsports	75	Ford	DAY	ATL	NSH	SLM	TOL	KEN	CLT; 22	BLN	KAN	MCH	LER	POC	POC	NSH	ISF	WIN	DSF	CHI	SLM	TAL	CLT; 12	SBO	91st	290	
2008	Bob Schacht Motorsports	75	Ford	DAY	SLM	IOW	KAN	CAR; 13	KEN	TOL	POC	MCH	CAY	KEN	BLN	POC	NSH; 34	ISF	DSF							70th	345	
2008	Bob Schacht Motorsports	75	Chevy																	CHI; 22	SLM	NJE	TAL	TOL		70th	345	
2009	Beard Motorsports	42	Chevy	DAY	SLM	CAR	TAL	KEN	TOL	POC	MCH; 32	MFD	IOW	KEN	BLN	POC	ISF	CHI	TOL; 32	DSF	NJE	SLM	KAN			55th	550	
2009	Craig Motorsports	54	Chevy																					CAR; 5		55th	550	
2010	Beard Motorsports	42	Chevy	DAY	PBE	SLM	TEX	TAL	TOL	POC	MCH; 34	IOW	MFD	POC	BLN	NJE	ISF	CHI	DSF	TOL	SLM	KAN	CAR			131st	60	
2011	Beard Motorsports	42	Chevy	DAY	TAL	SLM	TOL	NJE	CHI	POC	MCH; 26	WIN	BLN	IOW; 7												61st	375	
2011	Bob Schacht Motorsports	75	Chevy												IRP; QL^{†}	POC	ISF	MAD	DSF	SLM						61st	375	
2011	Beard Motorsports	45	Chevy																		KAN; 30	TOL				61st	375	
2012	Beard Motorsports	42	Chevy	DAY	MOB	SLM	TAL	TOL; 7	ELK	POC	MCH	WIN	NJE													49th	435	
2012	Beard Motorsports	45	Chevy											IOW; 4	CHI	IRP; DNQ	POC	BLN	ISF	MAD	SLM	DSF	KAN			49th	435	
^{†} – Qualified for Benny Chastain.

=== CARS Late Model Stock Car Tour ===
(key) (Bold – Pole position awarded by qualifying time. Italics – Pole position earned by points standings or practice time. * – Most laps led. ** – All laps led.)

CARS Late Model Stock Car Tour results
Year	Team	No.	Make	1	2	3	4	5	6	7	8	9	10	CLMSCTC	Pts	Ref
2015	Mullis Motorsports	54R	Chevy	SNM	ROU	HCY	SNM	TCM	MMS; 22	ROU	CON; 4	MYB	HCY; 4*	25th	71	

=== CARS Super Late Model Tour ===
(key)

CARS Super Late Model Tour results
Year	Team	No.	Make	1	2	3	4	5	6	7	8	9	10	CSLMTC	Pts	Ref
2015	Jeff Hunsinger	2R	Chevy	SNM; 24	ROU; 25	HCY; 21	SNM	TCM				MYB; 4		14th	129	
2015	Bob Schacht Motorsports	75	Chevy						MMS; 14	ROU				14th	129	
2015	Darren Shaw	17R	Chevy								CON; 9			14th	129	
2015	Jeff Hunsinger	2	N/A										HCY; 13	14th	129	

Sporting positions
Preceded by Shane Huffman	USAR Hooters Pro Cup Series Champion; 2004	Succeeded by Benny Gordon
Preceded by Benny Gordon	USAR Hooters Pro Cup Series Champion; 2006	Succeeded by Bobby Gill
Preceded by Benny Gordon	USA Racing Pro Cup Series Champion; 2009, 2010	Succeeded by Jeff Agnew
Achievements
Preceded by Eddie Mercer	Snowball Derby Winner; 2007	Succeeded by Augie Grill
