= 2025 Quaker State 400 =

NASCAR stock car race held in Hampton, Georgia, U.S.

2025 Quaker State 400 available at Walmart
Race details
- Race 18 of 36 in the 2025 NASCAR Cup Series
- Date: June 28, 2025
- Location: Atlanta Motor Speedway in Hampton, Georgia
- Course: Permanent racing facility
- Course length: 1.54 miles (2.48 km)
- Distance: 260 laps, 400.4 mi (644.4 km)
- Average speed: 111.792 miles per hour (179.912 km/h)

Pole position
Driver	Joey Logano	Team Penske
- Time: 30.979

Most laps led
Driver	Joey Logano	Team Penske
- Laps: 51

Fastest lap
Driver	John Hunter Nemechek	Legacy Motor Club
- Time: 29.822

Winner
No. 9	Chase Elliott	Hendrick Motorsports

Television in the United States
- Network: TNT
- Announcers: Adam Alexander, Dale Earnhardt Jr., and Steve Letarte
- Nielsen ratings: 1.608 million

Radio in the United States
- Radio: PRN
- Booth announcers: Brad Gillie and Mark Garrow
- Turn announcers: Doug Turnbull (1 & 2) and Nick Yeoman (3 & 4)

The 2025 Quaker State 400 was a NASCAR Cup Series race held on June 28, 2025, at Atlanta Motor Speedway in Hampton, Georgia. Contested over 260 laps on the 1.54-mile-long (2.48 km) asphalt quad-oval intermediate speedway (with superspeedway rules), it was the 18th race of the 2025 NASCAR Cup Series season, as well as the first race of the inaugural NASCAR In-Season Challenge.

Chase Elliott won the race, his first win since the 2024 Autotrader EchoPark Automotive 400. Brad Keselowski finished 2nd, and Alex Bowman finished 3rd. Tyler Reddick and Erik Jones rounded out the top five, and Ricky Stenhouse Jr., Zane Smith, Ty Dillon, Chris Buescher, and Carson Hocevar rounded out the top ten.

== Report ==
=== Background ===
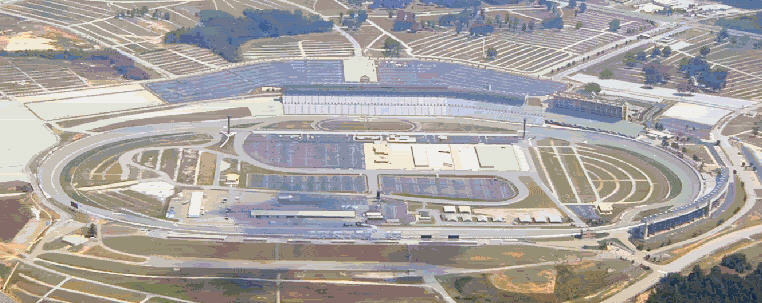
Atlanta Motor Speedway, the track where the race was held.

Atlanta Motor Speedway (currently known as EchoPark Speedway for sponsorship reasons, formerly known as the Atlanta International Raceway from 1960 to 1990) is a 1.54-mile race track in Hampton, Georgia, United States, 20 miles (32 km) south of Atlanta. It has annually hosted NASCAR Cup Series stock car races since its inauguration in 1960.

The venue was bought by Speedway Motorsports in 1990. In 1994, 46 condominiums were built over the northeastern side of the track. In 1997, to standardize the track with Speedway Motorsports' other two intermediate ovals, the entire track was almost completely rebuilt. The frontstretch and backstretch were swapped, and the configuration of the track was changed from oval to quad-oval, with a new official length of 1.54-mile (2.48 km) where before it was 1.522-mile (2.449 km). The project made the track one of the fastest on the NASCAR circuit. In July 2021 NASCAR announced that the track would be reprofiled for the 2022 season to have 28 degrees of banking and would be narrowed from 55 to 40 feet which the track claims will turn racing at the track similar to restrictor plate superspeedways. Despite the reprofiling being criticized by drivers, construction began in August 2021 and wrapped up in December 2021. The track has seating capacity of 71,000 to 125,000 people depending on the tracks configuration.

==== Entry list ====
- (R) denotes rookie driver.
- (i) denotes driver who is ineligible for series driver points.

No.	Driver	Team	Manufacturer
01	Corey LaJoie (i)	Rick Ware Racing	Ford
1	Ross Chastain	Trackhouse Racing	Chevrolet
2	Austin Cindric	Team Penske	Ford
3	Austin Dillon	Richard Childress Racing	Chevrolet
4	Noah Gragson	Front Row Motorsports	Ford
5	Kyle Larson	Hendrick Motorsports	Chevrolet
6	Brad Keselowski	RFK Racing	Ford
7	Justin Haley	Spire Motorsports	Chevrolet
8	Kyle Busch	Richard Childress Racing	Chevrolet
9	Chase Elliott	Hendrick Motorsports	Chevrolet
10	Ty Dillon	Kaulig Racing	Chevrolet
11	Denny Hamlin	Joe Gibbs Racing	Toyota
12	Ryan Blaney	Team Penske	Ford
16	A. J. Allmendinger	Kaulig Racing	Chevrolet
17	Chris Buescher	RFK Racing	Ford
19	Chase Briscoe	Joe Gibbs Racing	Toyota
20	Christopher Bell	Joe Gibbs Racing	Toyota
21	Josh Berry	Wood Brothers Racing	Ford
22	Joey Logano	Team Penske	Ford
23	Bubba Wallace	23XI Racing	Toyota
24	William Byron	Hendrick Motorsports	Chevrolet
34	Todd Gilliland	Front Row Motorsports	Ford
35	Riley Herbst (R)	23XI Racing	Toyota
38	Zane Smith	Front Row Motorsports	Ford
41	Cole Custer	Haas Factory Team	Ford
42	John Hunter Nemechek	Legacy Motor Club	Toyota
43	Erik Jones	Legacy Motor Club	Toyota
45	Tyler Reddick	23XI Racing	Toyota
47	Ricky Stenhouse Jr.	Hyak Motorsports	Chevrolet
48	Alex Bowman	Hendrick Motorsports	Chevrolet
51	Cody Ware	Rick Ware Racing	Ford
54	Ty Gibbs	Joe Gibbs Racing	Toyota
60	Ryan Preece	RFK Racing	Ford
66	David Starr (i)	MBM Motorsports	Ford
71	Michael McDowell	Spire Motorsports	Chevrolet
77	Carson Hocevar	Spire Motorsports	Chevrolet
78	B. J. McLeod (i)	Live Fast Motorsports	Chevrolet
87	Connor Zilisch (i)	Trackhouse Racing	Chevrolet
88	Shane van Gisbergen (R)	Trackhouse Racing	Chevrolet
99	Daniel Suárez	Trackhouse Racing	Chevrolet
Official entry list

== Qualifying ==
Joey Logano scored the pole for the race with a time of 30.979 and a speed of 178.960 mph (288.008 km/h).

=== Qualifying results ===
Pos	No.	Driver	Team	Manufacturer	Time	Speed
1	22	Joey Logano	Team Penske	Ford	30.979	178.960
2	21	Josh Berry	Wood Brothers Racing	Ford	30.979	178.960
3	12	Ryan Blaney	Team Penske	Ford	30.983	178.937
4	2	Austin Cindric	Team Penske	Ford	31.037	178.626
5	60	Ryan Preece	RFK Racing	Ford	31.130	178.092
6	6	Brad Keselowski	RFK Racing	Ford	31.153	177.960
7	41	Cole Custer	Haas Factory Team	Ford	31.155	177.949
8	38	Zane Smith	Front Row Motorsports	Ford	31.160	177.920
9	48	Alex Bowman	Hendrick Motorsports	Chevrolet	31.203	177.675
10	19	Chase Briscoe	Joe Gibbs Racing	Toyota	31.210	177.635
11	5	Kyle Larson	Hendrick Motorsports	Chevrolet	31.237	177.482
12	3	Austin Dillon	Richard Childress Racing	Chevrolet	31.242	177.453
13	17	Chris Buescher	RFK Racing	Ford	31.247	177.425
14	10	Ty Dillon	Kaulig Racing	Chevrolet	31.265	177.323
15	9	Chase Elliott	Hendrick Motorsports	Chevrolet	31.284	177.215
16	54	Ty Gibbs	Joe Gibbs Racing	Toyota	31.298	177.136
17	34	Todd Gilliland	Front Row Motorsports	Ford	31.302	177.113
18	24	William Byron	Hendrick Motorsports	Chevrolet	31.310	177.068
19	42	John Hunter Nemechek	Legacy Motor Club	Toyota	31.315	177.040
20	35	Riley Herbst (R)	23XI Racing	Toyota	31.315	177.040
21	16	A. J. Allmendinger	Kaulig Racing	Chevrolet	31.329	176.961
22	7	Justin Haley	Spire Motorsports	Chevrolet	31.329	176.961
23	45	Tyler Reddick	23XI Racing	Toyota	31.331	176.949
24	23	Bubba Wallace	23XI Racing	Toyota	31.353	176.825
25	01	Corey LaJoie (i)	Rick Ware Racing	Ford	31.356	176.808
26	43	Erik Jones	Legacy Motor Club	Toyota	31.358	176.797
27	4	Noah Gragson	Front Row Motorsports	Ford	31.376	176.696
28	20	Christopher Bell	Joe Gibbs Racing	Toyota	31.405	176.532
29	8	Kyle Busch	Richard Childress Racing	Chevrolet	31.407	176.521
30	77	Carson Hocevar	Spire Motorsports	Chevrolet	31.409	176.510
31	99	Daniel Suárez	Trackhouse Racing	Chevrolet	31.446	176.302
32	71	Michael McDowell	Spire Motorsports	Chevrolet	31.462	176.213
33	11	Denny Hamlin	Joe Gibbs Racing	Toyota	31.463	176.207
34	1	Ross Chastain	Trackhouse Racing	Chevrolet	31.484	176.089
35	88	Shane van Gisbergen (R)	Trackhouse Racing	Chevrolet	31.485	176.084
36	87	Connor Zilisch (i)	Trackhouse Racing	Chevrolet	31.500	176.000
37	47	Ricky Stenhouse Jr.	Hyak Motorsports	Chevrolet	31.537	175.794
38	78	B. J. McLeod (i)	Live Fast Motorsports	Chevrolet	31.550	175.721
39	51	Cody Ware	Rick Ware Racing	Ford	31.564	175.643
40	66	David Starr (i)	MBM Motorsports	Ford	34.113	162.519
Official qualifying results

== Race ==
=== Race results ===
==== Stage Results ====
Stage One Laps: 60

Pos	No	Driver	Team	Manufacturer	Points
1	2	Austin Cindric	Team Penske	Ford	10
2	6	Brad Keselowski	RFK Racing	Ford	9
3	22	Joey Logano	Team Penske	Ford	8
4	24	William Byron	Hendrick Motorsports	Chevrolet	7
5	77	Carson Hocevar	Spire Motorsports	Chevrolet	6
6	47	Ricky Stenhouse Jr.	Hyak Motorsports	Chevrolet	5
7	21	Josh Berry	Wood Brothers Racing	Ford	4
8	88	Shane van Gisbergen (R)	Trackhouse Racing	Chevrolet	3
9	9	Chase Elliott	Hendrick Motorsports	Chevrolet	2
10	23	Bubba Wallace	23XI Racing	Toyota	1
Official stage one results

Stage Two Laps: 100

Pos	No	Driver	Team	Manufacturer	Points
1	45	Tyler Reddick	23XI Racing	Toyota	10
2	9	Chase Elliott	Hendrick Motorsports	Chevrolet	9
3	17	Chris Buescher	RFK Racing	Ford	8
4	48	Alex Bowman	Hendrick Motorsports	Chevrolet	7
5	43	Erik Jones	Legacy Motor Club	Toyota	6
6	10	Ty Dillon	Kaulig Racing	Chevrolet	5
7	88	Shane van Gisbergen (R)	Trackhouse Racing	Chevrolet	4
8	38	Zane Smith	Front Row Motorsports	Ford	3
9	42	John Hunter Nemechek	Legacy Motor Club	Toyota	2
10	6	Brad Keselowski	RFK Racing	Ford	1
Official stage two results

=== Final Stage Results ===
Stage Three Laps: 100

Pos	Grid	No	Driver	Team	Manufacturer	Laps	Points
1	15	9	Chase Elliott	Hendrick Motorsports	Chevrolet	260	51
2	6	6	Brad Keselowski	RFK Racing	Ford	260	45
3	9	48	Alex Bowman	Hendrick Motorsports	Chevrolet	260	41
4	23	45	Tyler Reddick	23XI Racing	Toyota	260	43
5	26	43	Erik Jones	Legacy Motor Club	Toyota	260	38
6	37	47	Ricky Stenhouse Jr.	Hyak Motorsports	Chevrolet	260	36
7	8	38	Zane Smith	Front Row Motorsports	Ford	260	33
8	14	10	Ty Dillon	Kaulig Racing	Chevrolet	260	34
9	13	17	Chris Buescher	RFK Racing	Ford	260	36
10	30	77	Carson Hocevar	Spire Motorsports	Chevrolet	260	33
11	36	87	Connor Zilisch (i)	Trackhouse Racing	Chevrolet	260	0
12	21	16	A. J. Allmendinger	Kaulig Racing	Chevrolet	260	25
13	39	51	Cody Ware	Rick Ware Racing	Ford	260	24
14	16	54	Ty Gibbs	Joe Gibbs Racing	Toyota	260	23
15	5	60	Ryan Preece	RFK Racing	Ford	260	22
16	38	78	B. J. McLeod (i)	Live Fast Motorsports	Chevrolet	260	0
17	11	5	Kyle Larson	Hendrick Motorsports	Chevrolet	260	20
18	32	71	Michael McDowell	Spire Motorsports	Chevrolet	260	19
19	7	41	Cole Custer	Haas Factory Team	Ford	260	18
20	12	3	Austin Dillon	Richard Childress Racing	Chevrolet	260	17
21	29	8	Kyle Busch	Richard Childress Racing	Chevrolet	260	16
22	24	23	Bubba Wallace	23XI Racing	Toyota	258	16
23	22	7	Justin Haley	Spire Motorsports	Chevrolet	257	14
24	35	88	Shane van Gisbergen (R)	Trackhouse Racing	Chevrolet	257	20
25	27	4	Noah Gragson	Front Row Motorsports	Ford	252	12
26	19	42	John Hunter Nemechek	Legacy Motor Club	Toyota	241	13
27	17	34	Todd Gilliland	Front Row Motorsports	Ford	237	10
28	20	35	Riley Herbst (R)	23XI Racing	Toyota	223	9
29	40	66	David Starr (i)	MBM Motorsports	Ford	184	0
30	28	20	Christopher Bell	Joe Gibbs Racing	Toyota	114	7
31	33	11	Denny Hamlin	Joe Gibbs Racing	Toyota	72	6
32	2	21	Josh Berry	Wood Brothers Racing	Ford	70	9
33	34	1	Ross Chastain	Trackhouse Racing	Chevrolet	69	4
34	31	99	Daniel Suárez	Trackhouse Racing	Chevrolet	69	3
35	10	19	Chase Briscoe	Joe Gibbs Racing	Toyota	69	2
36	1	22	Joey Logano	Team Penske	Ford	69	9
37	18	24	William Byron	Hendrick Motorsports	Chevrolet	69	8
38	4	2	Austin Cindric	Team Penske	Ford	68	11
39	25	01	Corey LaJoie (i)	Rick Ware Racing	Ford	68	0
40	3	12	Ryan Blaney	Team Penske	Ford	56	1
Official race results

=== Race statistics ===
- Lead changes: 46 among 13 different drivers
- Cautions/Laps: 10 for 68
- Red flags: 2 for 14 minutes and 34 seconds
- Time of race: 3 hours, 34 minutes and 54 seconds
- Average speed: 111.792 miles per hour (179.912 km/h)

== Media ==
=== Television ===
This was TNT's first race since the 2014 Camping World RV Sales 301. It was produced by NASCAR Productions, as were the previous five races. Adam Alexander, Dale Earnhardt Jr. and Steve Letarte called the race from the broadcast booth. Marty Snider, Danielle Trotta, Alan Cavanna and Mamba Smith handled pit road for the television side.

TNT
Booth announcers	Pit reporters
Lap-by-lap: Adam Alexander; Color-commentator: Dale Earnhardt Jr. Color-commentator: Steve Letarte	Marty Snider; Danielle Trotta; Alan Cavanna; Mamba Smith

=== Radio ===
The race was broadcast on radio by the Performance Racing Network and simulcast on Sirius XM NASCAR Radio. Brad Gillie and Mark Garrow called the race from the booth when the field races down the front stretch. Doug Turnbull called the race from atop a billboard outside of turn 2 when the field races through turns 1 and 2, and Nick Yeoman called the race from a billboard outside of turn 3 when the field races through turns 3 and 4. On pit road, PRN was manned by Brett McMillan, Heather DeBeaux and Andrew Kurland.

PRN
Booth announcers	Turn announcers	Pit reporters
Lead announcer: Brad Gillie; Announcer: Mark Garrow	Turns 1 & 2: Doug Turnbull; Turns 3 & 4: Nick Yeoman	Brett McMillan; Heather DeBeaux; Andrew Kurland

== Standings after the race ==
Drivers' Championship standings

	Pos	Driver	Points
	1	William Byron	631
3	2	Chase Elliott	594 (–37)
1	3	Kyle Larson	589 (–42)
1	4	Denny Hamlin	551 (–80)
1	5	Christopher Bell	551 (–80)
1	6	Tyler Reddick	533 (–98)
1	7	Ryan Blaney	504 (–127)
	8	Ross Chastain	458 (–173)
2	9	Chris Buescher	457 (–174)
1	10	Chase Briscoe	452 (–179)
1	11	Joey Logano	445 (–186)
1	12	Alex Bowman	444 (–187)
1	13	Bubba Wallace	428 (–203)
	14	Ryan Preece	405 (–226)
	15	Austin Cindric	379 (–252)
2	16	Erik Jones	379 (–252)
Official driver's standings

Manufacturers' Championship standings

Pos	Manufacturer	Points
1	Chevrolet	656
2	Toyota	641 (–15)
3	Ford	610 (–46)

- Note: Only the first 16 positions are included for the driver standings.
- . – Driver has clinched a position in the NASCAR Cup Series playoffs.

=== NASCAR In-Season Challenge bracket ===
Atlanta
1	#11 Denny Hamlin	31st
32	#10 Ty Dillon	8th
16	#8 Kyle Busch	21st
17	#6 Brad Keselowski	2nd
8	#48 Alex Bowman	3rd
25	#22 Joey Logano	25th
9	#23 Bubba Wallace	22nd
24	#99 Daniel Suárez	34th
12	#42 John Hunter Nemechek	26th
21	#21 Josh Berry	32nd
5	#9 Chase Elliott	1st
28	#3 Austin Dillon	20th
13	#1 Ross Chastain	33rd
20	#43 Erik Jones	5th
4	#20 Christopher Bell	30th
29	#47 Ricky Stenhouse Jr.	6th
2	#19 Chase Briscoe	35th
31	#4 Noah Gragson	25th
15	#60 Ryan Preece	15th
18	#24 William Byron	37th
7	#12 Ryan Blaney	40th
26	#77 Carson Hocevar	10th
10	#5 Kyle Larson	17th
23	#45 Tyler Reddick	4th
11	#71 Michael McDowell	18th
22	#16 A. J. Allmendinger	12th
6	#54 Ty Gibbs	14th
27	#7 Justin Haley	23rd
14	#38 Zane Smith	7th
19	#2 Austin Cindric	38th
3	#17 Chris Buescher	9th
30	#34 Todd Gilliland	27th

Chicago
32	#10 Ty Dillon	20th
17	#6 Keselowski	37th
8	#48 Bowman	8th
9	#23 Wallace	28th
12	#42 Nemechek	15th
5	#9 Elliott	16th
20	#43 Jones	25th
29	#47 Stenhouse Jr.	31st
31	#4 Gragson	30th
15	#60 Preece	7th
26	#77 Hocevar	35th
23	#45 Reddick	3rd
22	#16 Allmendinger	6th
6	#54 Gibbs	2nd
14	#38 Smith	14th
3	#17 Buescher	18th

Sonoma
32	#10 Ty Dillon	17th
8	#48 Bowman	19th
12	#42 Nemechek	28th
20	#43 Jones	29th
15	#60 Preece	12th
23	#45 Reddick	6th
6	#54 Gibbs	7th
14	#38 Smith	27th

Dover
32	#10 Ty Dillon	20th
12	#42 Nemechek	21st
23	#45 Reddick	12th
6	#54 Gibbs	5th

Indianapolis
32	#10 Ty Dillon	28th
6	#54 Gibbs	21st

Previous race: 2025 The Great American Getaway 400	NASCAR Cup Series; 2025 season	Next race: 2025 Grant Park 165
