= 2025 Grant Park 165 =

NASCAR stock car race held in Chicago, Illinois, U.S.

Race details
- Race 19 of 36 in the 2025 NASCAR Cup Series
- Date: July 6, 2025
- Location: Chicago Street Course in Chicago, Illinois
- Course: Permanent racing facility
- Course length: 2.2 miles (3.5 km)
- Distance: 75 laps, 165 mi (265.542 km)
- Average speed: 66.674 miles per hour (107.301 km/h)

Pole position
Driver	Shane van Gisbergen	Trackhouse Racing
- Time: 1:29.656

Most laps led
Driver	Michael McDowell	Spire Motorsports
- Laps: 31

Fastest lap
Driver	Tyler Reddick	23XI Racing
- Time: 1:30.091

Winner
No. 88	Shane van Gisbergen	Trackhouse Racing

Television in the United States
- Network: TNT
- Announcers: Adam Alexander, Dale Earnhardt Jr., and Steve Letarte

Radio in the United States
- Radio: MRN
- Booth announcers: Alex Hayden and Mike Bagley
- Turn announcers: Dave Moody (Turns 1 and 6), Kurt Becker (Turns 2–5) and Tim Catalfamo (Turns 7–11)

The 2025 Grant Park 165 was a NASCAR Cup Series race held on July 6, 2025, at the Chicago Street Course in Chicago, Illinois. Contested over 75 laps on the 2.2-mile (3.5 km) street course, it was the 19th race of the 2025 NASCAR Cup Series season, as well as the second race of the inaugural NASCAR In-Season Challenge.

Shane van Gisbergen won the race. Ty Gibbs finished 2nd, and Tyler Reddick finished 3rd. Denny Hamlin and Kyle Busch rounded out the top five, and A. J. Allmendinger, Ryan Preece, Alex Bowman, Austin Hill, and Ross Chastain rounded out the top ten.

== Report ==
=== Background ===
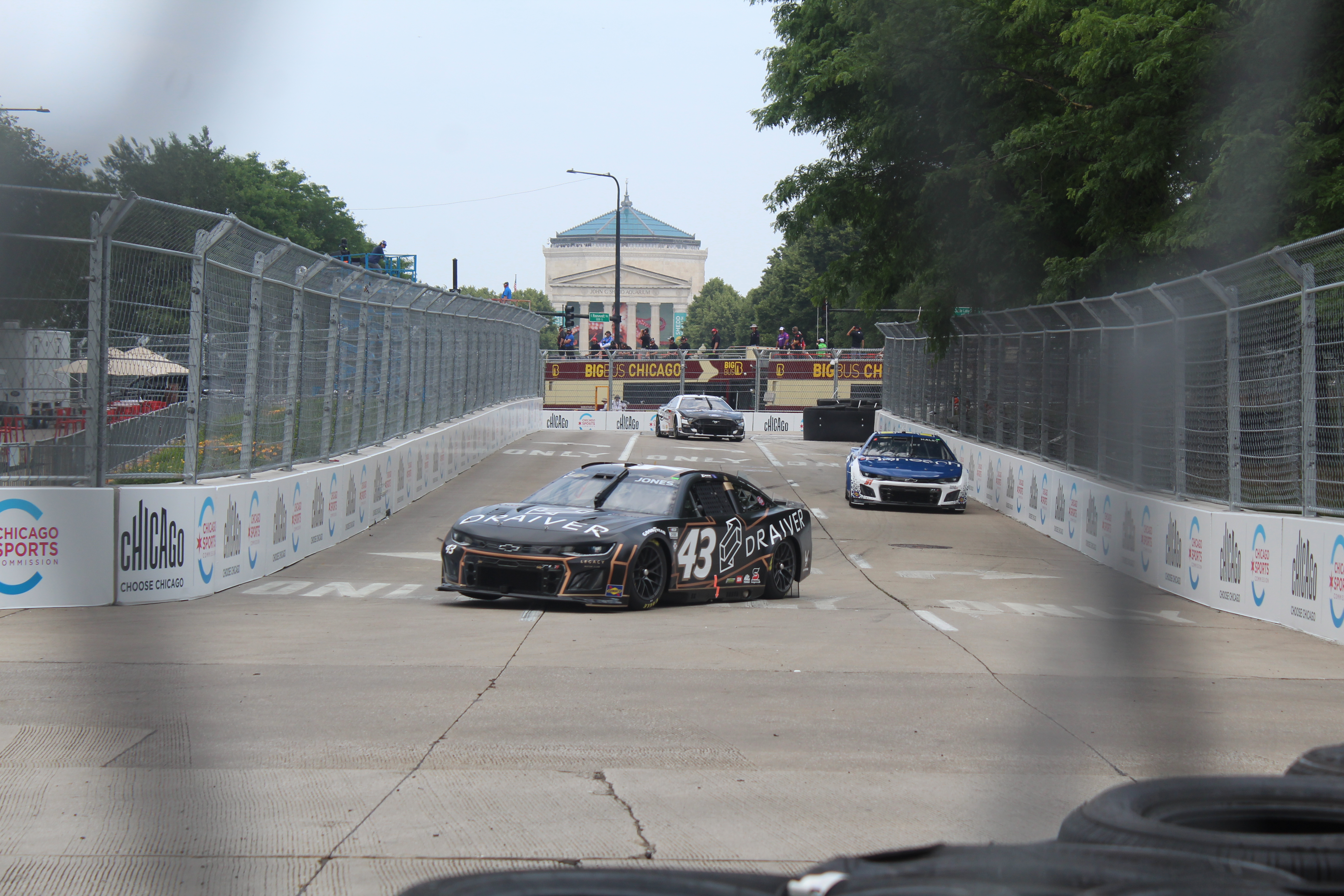
The Chicago Street Course, where the race was held.

The Chicago Street Course is a 2.2 mi (3.5 km) street circuit located in the city of Chicago, Illinois, United States. It hosts the NASCAR Cup Series and NASCAR Xfinity Series. The track was initially a conceptual track on iRacing made for the eNASCAR iRacing Pro Invitational Series in 2021.

The track for the race ended up being the exact same layout as the version used in 2021 for the eNASCAR iRacing Pro Invitational Series. The start/finish line is located on South Columbus Drive in front of Buckingham Fountain in Grant Park. The cars will go south and then turn left onto East Balbo Drive and then right onto South Lake Shore Drive (also part of U.S. Route 41), which is alongside Lake Michigan. The cars will then turn right onto East Roosevelt Road and then make another right, which gets them back onto South Columbus Drive where they are going north. They will then reach the intersection of South Columbus Drive and East Balbo Drive again and will make a left turn. When they are back on East Balbo Drive, they will cross a bridge over the Metra Electric District tracks. Next, the cars will turn right onto South Michigan Avenue and go north, onto East Congress Plaza Drive, and back onto South Michigan Ave. Lastly, they will make a right turn onto East Jackson Drive, go back across the Metra Electric tracks, and right back onto South Columbus Drive to the start/finish line.

On October 20, 2023, NASCAR announced that the Cup Series Chicago Street Race would be shortened from 220 miles (354.056 km) and 100 laps to 165 miles (265.542) and 75 laps.

==== Entry list ====
- (R) denotes rookie driver.
- (i) denotes driver who is ineligible for series driver points.

No.	Driver	Team	Manufacturer
1	Ross Chastain	Trackhouse Racing	Chevrolet
2	Austin Cindric	Team Penske	Ford
3	Austin Dillon	Richard Childress Racing	Chevrolet
4	Noah Gragson	Front Row Motorsports	Ford
5	Kyle Larson	Hendrick Motorsports	Chevrolet
6	Brad Keselowski	RFK Racing	Ford
7	Justin Haley	Spire Motorsports	Chevrolet
8	Kyle Busch	Richard Childress Racing	Chevrolet
9	Chase Elliott	Hendrick Motorsports	Chevrolet
10	Ty Dillon	Kaulig Racing	Chevrolet
11	Denny Hamlin	Joe Gibbs Racing	Toyota
12	Ryan Blaney	Team Penske	Ford
13	Will Brown	Kaulig Racing	Chevrolet
16	A. J. Allmendinger	Kaulig Racing	Chevrolet
17	Chris Buescher	RFK Racing	Ford
19	Chase Briscoe	Joe Gibbs Racing	Toyota
20	Christopher Bell	Joe Gibbs Racing	Toyota
21	Josh Berry	Wood Brothers Racing	Ford
22	Joey Logano	Team Penske	Ford
23	Bubba Wallace	23XI Racing	Toyota
24	William Byron	Hendrick Motorsports	Chevrolet
33	Austin Hill (i)	Richard Childress Racing	Chevrolet
34	Todd Gilliland	Front Row Motorsports	Ford
35	Riley Herbst (R)	23XI Racing	Toyota
38	Zane Smith	Front Row Motorsports	Ford
41	Cole Custer	Haas Factory Team	Ford
42	John Hunter Nemechek	Legacy Motor Club	Toyota
43	Erik Jones	Legacy Motor Club	Toyota
45	Tyler Reddick	23XI Racing	Toyota
47	Ricky Stenhouse Jr.	Hyak Motorsports	Chevrolet
48	Alex Bowman	Hendrick Motorsports	Chevrolet
51	Cody Ware	Rick Ware Racing	Ford
54	Ty Gibbs	Joe Gibbs Racing	Toyota
60	Ryan Preece	RFK Racing	Ford
66	Josh Bilicki	Garage 66	Ford
67	Corey Heim (i)	23XI Racing	Toyota
71	Michael McDowell	Spire Motorsports	Chevrolet
77	Carson Hocevar	Spire Motorsports	Chevrolet
78	Katherine Legge	Live Fast Motorsports	Chevrolet
88	Shane van Gisbergen (R)	Trackhouse Racing	Chevrolet
99	Daniel Suárez	Trackhouse Racing	Chevrolet
Official entry list

== Practice ==
Bubba Wallace was the fastest in the practice session with a time of 1:30.951 seconds and a speed of 87.079 mph (140.140 km/h).

=== Practice results ===
Pos	No.	Driver	Team	Manufacturer	Time	Speed
1	23	Bubba Wallace	23XI Racing	Toyota	1:30.951	87.079
2	24	William Byron	Hendrick Motorsports	Chevrolet	1:31.006	87.027
3	9	Chase Elliott	Hendrick Motorsports	Chevrolet	1:31.072	86.964
Official practice results

== Qualifying ==
Shane van Gisbergen scored the pole for the race with a time of 1:29.656 and a speed of 88.338 mph (142.166 km/h). Corey Heim failed to qualify, becoming the first non-Daytona 500 driver to not qualify for a race since the 2018 AAA Texas 500.

=== Qualifying results ===
Pos	No.	Driver	Team	Manufacturer	Time	Speed
1	88	Shane van Gisbergen (R)	Trackhouse Racing	Chevrolet	1:29.656	88.338
2	71	Michael McDowell	Spire Motorsports	Chevrolet	1:30.124	87.879
3	77	Carson Hocevar	Spire Motorsports	Chevrolet	1:30.180	87.824
4	45	Tyler Reddick	23XI Racing	Toyota	1:30.227	87.779
5	19	Chase Briscoe	Joe Gibbs Racing	Toyota	1:30.273	87.481
6	8	Kyle Busch	Richard Childress Racing	Chevrolet	1:30.371	87.639
7	60	Ryan Preece	RFK Racing	Ford	1:30.534	87.481
8	17	Chris Buescher	RFK Racing	Ford	1:30.544	87.471
9	54	Ty Gibbs	Joe Gibbs Racing	Toyota	1:30.627	87.391
10	3	Austin Dillon	Richard Childress Racing	Chevrolet	1:30.719	87.303
11	48	Alex Bowman	Hendrick Motorsports	Chevrolet	1:30.783	87.241
12	22	Joey Logano	Team Penske	Ford	1:30.785	87.239
13	20	Christopher Bell	Joe Gibbs Racing	Toyota	1:30.836	87.190
14	5	Kyle Larson	Hendrick Motorsports	Chevrolet	1:30.845	87.181
15	6	Brad Keselowski	RFK Racing	Ford	1:30.846	87.181
16	16	A. J. Allmendinger	Kaulig Racing	Chevrolet	1:30.861	87.166
17	12	Ryan Blaney	Team Penske	Ford	1:30.886	87.142
18	99	Daniel Suárez	Trackhouse Racing	Chevrolet	1:30.910	87.119
19	13	Will Brown	Kaulig Racing	Chevrolet	1:31.045	86.990
20	34	Todd Gilliland	Front Row Motorsports	Ford	1:31.075	86.961
21	35	Riley Herbst (R)	23XI Racing	Toyota	1:31.171	86.870
22	1	Ross Chastain	Trackhouse Racing	Chevrolet	1:31.205	86.837
23	41	Cole Custer	Haas Factory Team	Ford	1:31.296	86.751
24	4	Noah Gragson	Front Row Motorsports	Ford	1:31.335	86.714
25	42	John Hunter Nemechek	Legacy Motor Club	Toyota	1:31.359	86.691
26	38	Zane Smith	Front Row Motorsports	Ford	1:31.380	86.671
27	2	Austin Cindric	Team Penske	Ford	1:31.516	86.542
28	7	Justin Haley	Spire Motorsports	Chevrolet	1:31.604	86.459
29	21	Josh Berry	Wood Brothers Racing	Ford	1:31.650	86.416
30	33	Austin Hill (i)	Richard Childress Racing	Chevrolet	1:31.663	86.403
31	66	Josh Bilicki (i)	Garage 66	Ford	1:31.989	86.097
32	47	Ricky Stenhouse Jr.	Hyak Motorsports	Chevrolet	1:32.146	85.951
33	78	Katherine Legge	Live Fast Motorsports	Chevrolet	1:32.368	85.744
34	43	Erik Jones	Legacy Motor Club	Toyota	1:32.541	85.584
35	51	Cody Ware	Rick Ware Racing	Ford	1:32.681	85.454
36	10	Ty Dillon	Kaulig Racing	Chevrolet	1:33.313	84.876
37	23	Bubba Wallace	23XI Racing	Toyota	1:44.783	75.585
38	24	William Byron	Hendrick Motorsports	Chevrolet	0.000	0.000
39	9	Chase Elliott	Hendrick Motorsports	Chevrolet	0.000	0.000
40	11	Denny Hamlin	Joe Gibbs Racing	Toyota	0.000	0.000
Did not qualify
41	67	Corey Heim (i)	23XI Racing	Toyota	1:32.506	85.616
Official qualifying results

== Race ==
=== Race results ===
==== Stage Results ====
Stage One Laps: 20

Pos	No	Driver	Team	Manufacturer	Points
1	71	Michael McDowell	Spire Motorsports	Chevrolet	10
2	8	Kyle Busch	Richard Childress Racing	Chevrolet	9
3	45	Tyler Reddick	23XI Racing	Toyota	8
4	19	Chase Briscoe	Joe Gibbs Racing	Toyota	7
5	60	Ryan Preece	RFK Racing	Ford	6
6	1	Ross Chastain	Trackhouse Racing	Chevrolet	5
7	42	John Hunter Nemechek	Legacy Motor Club	Toyota	4
8	38	Zane Smith	Front Row Motorsports	Ford	3
9	33	Austin Hill (i)	Richard Childress Racing	Chevrolet	0
10	4	Noah Gragson	Front Row Motorsports	Ford	1
Official stage one results

Stage Two Laps: 25

Pos	No	Driver	Team	Manufacturer	Points
1	12	Ryan Blaney	Team Penske	Ford	10
2	19	Chase Briscoe	Joe Gibbs Racing	Toyota	9
3	45	Tyler Reddick	23XI Racing	Toyota	8
4	48	Alex Bowman	Hendrick Motorsports	Chevrolet	7
5	23	Bubba Wallace	23XI Racing	Toyota	6
6	43	Erik Jones	Legacy Motor Club	Toyota	5
7	11	Denny Hamlin	Joe Gibbs Racing	Toyota	4
8	9	Chase Elliott	Hendrick Motorsports	Chevrolet	3
9	42	John Hunter Nemechek	Legacy Motor Club	Toyota	2
10	20	Christopher Bell	Joe Gibbs Racing	Toyota	1
Official stage two results

=== Final Stage Results ===
Stage Three Laps: 30

Pos	Grid	No	Driver	Team	Manufacturer	Laps	Points
1	1	88	Shane van Gisbergen (R)	Trackhouse Racing	Chevrolet	75	40
2	9	54	Ty Gibbs	Joe Gibbs Racing	Toyota	75	35
3	4	45	Tyler Reddick	23XI Racing	Toyota	75	50
4	40	11	Denny Hamlin	Joe Gibbs Racing	Toyota	75	37
5	6	8	Kyle Busch	Richard Childress Racing	Chevrolet	75	41
6	16	16	A. J. Allmendinger	Kaulig Racing	Chevrolet	75	31
7	7	60	Ryan Preece	RFK Racing	Ford	75	36
8	11	48	Alex Bowman	Hendrick Motorsports	Chevrolet	75	36
9	30	33	Austin Hill (i)	Richard Childress Racing	Chevrolet	75	0
10	22	1	Ross Chastain	Trackhouse Racing	Chevrolet	75	32
11	12	22	Joey Logano	Team Penske	Ford	75	26
12	17	12	Ryan Blaney	Team Penske	Ford	75	35
13	14	5	Kyle Larson	Hendrick Motorsports	Chevrolet	75	24
14	26	38	Zane Smith	Front Row Motorsports	Ford	75	26
15	25	42	John Hunter Nemechek	Legacy Motor Club	Toyota	75	28
16	39	9	Chase Elliott	Hendrick Motorsports	Chevrolet	75	24
17	21	35	Riley Herbst (R)	23XI Racing	Toyota	75	20
18	8	17	Chris Buescher	RFK Racing	Ford	75	19
19	33	78	Katherine Legge	Live Fast Motorsports	Chevrolet	75	18
20	36	10	Ty Dillon	Kaulig Racing	Chevrolet	75	17
21	31	66	Josh Bilicki (i)	Garage 66	Ford	75	0
22	28	7	Justin Haley	Spire Motorsports	Chevrolet	75	15
23	5	19	Chase Briscoe	Joe Gibbs Racing	Toyota	75	30
24	13	20	Christopher Bell	Joe Gibbs Racing	Toyota	75	14
25	34	43	Erik Jones	Legacy Motor Club	Toyota	74	17
26	35	51	Cody Ware	Rick Ware Racing	Ford	73	11
27	27	2	Austin Cindric	Team Penske	Ford	72	10
28	37	23	Bubba Wallace	23XI Racing	Toyota	70	14
29	18	99	Daniel Suárez	Trackhouse Racing	Chevrolet	69	8
30	24	4	Noah Gragson	Front Row Motorsports	Ford	68	8
31	32	47	Ricky Stenhouse Jr.	Hyak Motorsports	Chevrolet	62	7
32	2	71	Michael McDowell	Spire Motorsports	Chevrolet	53	15
33	23	41	Cole Custer	Haas Factory Team	Ford	29	4
34	29	21	Josh Berry	Wood Brothers Racing	Ford	28	3
35	3	77	Carson Hocevar	Spire Motorsports	Chevrolet	2	2
36	10	3	Austin Dillon	Richard Childress Racing	Chevrolet	2	1
37	15	6	Brad Keselowski	RFK Racing	Ford	2	1
38	20	34	Todd Gilliland	Front Row Motorsports	Ford	2	1
39	19	13	Will Brown	Kaulig Racing	Chevrolet	2	1
40	38	24	William Byron	Hendrick Motorsports	Chevrolet	1	1
Official race results

=== Race statistics ===
- Lead changes: 6 among 5 different drivers
- Cautions/Laps: 7 for 15
- Red flags: 1 for 14 minutes and 42 seconds
- Time of race: 2 hours, 28 minutes and 17 seconds
- Average speed: 66.764 miles per hour (107.446 km/h)

== Media ==
=== Television ===
TNT covered the race on the television side. Adam Alexander, Dale Earnhardt Jr. and Steve Letarte called the race from the broadcast booth. Marty Snider, Danielle Trotta, Alan Cavanna and Mamba Smith handled pit road for the television side.

TNT
Booth announcers	Pit reporters
Lap-by-lap: Adam Alexander; Color-commentator: Dale Earnhardt Jr. Color-commentator: Steve Letarte	Marty Snider; Danielle Trotta; Alan Cavanna; Mamba Smith

=== Radio ===
Radio coverage of the race was broadcast by Motor Racing Network (MRN) and was also simulcast on Sirius XM NASCAR Radio.

MRN
Booth announcers	Turn announcers	Pit reporters
Lead announcer: Alex Hayden; Announcer: Mike Bagley	Turns 1 & 6: Dave Moody; Turns 2–5: Kurt Becker; Turns 7–11: Tim Catalfamo	Steve Post; Chris Wilner

== Standings after the race ==
Drivers' Championship standings

	Pos	Driver	Points
	1	William Byron	632
	2	Chase Elliott	619 (–13)
	3	Kyle Larson	613 (–19)
	4	Denny Hamlin	589 (–43)
1	5	Tyler Reddick	584 (–48)
1	6	Christopher Bell	565 (–67)
	7	Ryan Blaney	539 (–93)
	8	Ross Chastain	490 (–142)
1	9	Chase Briscoe	482 (–150)
2	10	Alex Bowman	480 (–152)
2	11	Chris Buescher	476 (–156)
1	12	Joey Logano	471 (–161)
	13	Bubba Wallace	443 (–189)
	14	Ryan Preece	441 (–191)
2	15	A. J. Allmendinger	400 (–232)
4	16	Kyle Busch	397 (–235)
Official driver's standings

Manufacturers' Championship standings

Pos	Manufacturer	Points
1	Chevrolet	696
2	Toyota	676 (–20)
3	Ford	640 (–56)

- Note: Only the first 16 positions are included for the driver standings.
- . – Driver has clinched a position in the NASCAR Cup Series playoffs.

=== NASCAR In-Season Challenge bracket ===
Atlanta
1	#11 Denny Hamlin	31st
32	#10 Ty Dillon	8th
16	#8 Kyle Busch	21st
17	#6 Brad Keselowski	2nd
8	#48 Alex Bowman	3rd
25	#22 Joey Logano	25th
9	#23 Bubba Wallace	22nd
24	#99 Daniel Suárez	34th
12	#42 John Hunter Nemechek	26th
21	#21 Josh Berry	32nd
5	#9 Chase Elliott	1st
28	#3 Austin Dillon	20th
13	#1 Ross Chastain	33rd
20	#43 Erik Jones	5th
4	#20 Christopher Bell	30th
29	#47 Ricky Stenhouse Jr.	6th
2	#19 Chase Briscoe	35th
31	#4 Noah Gragson	25th
15	#60 Ryan Preece	15th
18	#24 William Byron	37th
7	#12 Ryan Blaney	40th
26	#77 Carson Hocevar	10th
10	#5 Kyle Larson	17th
23	#45 Tyler Reddick	4th
11	#71 Michael McDowell	18th
22	#16 A. J. Allmendinger	12th
6	#54 Ty Gibbs	14th
27	#7 Justin Haley	23rd
14	#38 Zane Smith	7th
19	#2 Austin Cindric	38th
3	#17 Chris Buescher	9th
30	#34 Todd Gilliland	27th

Chicago
32	#10 Ty Dillon	20th
17	#6 Keselowski	37th
8	#48 Bowman	8th
9	#23 Wallace	28th
12	#42 Nemechek	15th
5	#9 Elliott	16th
20	#43 Jones	25th
29	#47 Stenhouse Jr.	31st
31	#4 Gragson	30th
15	#60 Preece	7th
26	#77 Hocevar	35th
23	#45 Reddick	3rd
22	#16 Allmendinger	6th
6	#54 Gibbs	2nd
14	#38 Smith	14th
3	#17 Buescher	18th

Sonoma
32	#10 Ty Dillon	17th
8	#48 Bowman	19th
12	#42 Nemechek	28th
20	#43 Jones	29th
15	#60 Preece	12th
23	#45 Reddick	6th
6	#54 Gibbs	7th
14	#38 Smith	27th

Dover
32	#10 Ty Dillon	20th
12	#42 Nemechek	21st
23	#45 Reddick	12th
6	#54 Gibbs	5th

Indianapolis
32	#10 Ty Dillon	28th
6	#54 Gibbs	21st

== Notes ==
Previous race: 2025 Quaker State 400	NASCAR Cup Series; 2025 season	Next race: 2025 Toyota/Save Mart 350
