= 2025 Brickyard 400 =

NASCAR stock car race held in Indianapolis, Indiana, U.S.

2025 Brickyard 400 presented by PPG
Race details
- Race 22 of 36 in the 2025 NASCAR Cup Series
- Date: July 27, 2025
- Location: Indianapolis Motor Speedway in Speedway, Indiana
- Course: Permanent racing facility
- Course length: 2.5 miles (4.02 km)
- Distance: 168 laps, 420 mi (672 km)
- Scheduled distance: 160 laps, 400 mi (640 km)
- Average speed: 124.598 miles per hour (200.521 km/h)

Pole position
Driver	Chase Briscoe	Joe Gibbs Racing
- Time: 49.136

Most laps led
Driver	Austin Cindric	Team Penske
- Laps: 40

Fastest lap
Driver	Denny Hamlin	Joe Gibbs Racing
- Time: 49.741

Winner
No. 23	Bubba Wallace	23XI Racing

Television in the United States
- Network: TNT
- Announcers: Adam Alexander, Dale Earnhardt Jr., and Steve Letarte

Radio in the United States
- Radio: IMS Radio
- Booth announcers: Brad Gillie and Nick Yeoman
- Turn announcers: Alex Hayden (Turn 1), Michael Young (Turn 2), Pat Patterson (Turn 3), and Chris Wilner (Turn 4)

The 2025 Brickyard 400 presented by PPG was a NASCAR Cup Series race held on July 27, 2025, at Indianapolis Motor Speedway in Speedway, Indiana. Contested over 168 laps, extended from 160 laps due to an overtime finish, on the 2.5-mile (4.0 km) oval, it was the 22nd race of the 2025 NASCAR Cup Series season, as well as the fifth and final race of the inaugural NASCAR In-Season Challenge.

Bubba Wallace won the race, his first win since the 2022 Hollywood Casino 400. Kyle Larson finished 2nd, and Denny Hamlin finished 3rd. Ryan Preece and Brad Keselowski rounded out the top five, and Todd Gilliland, Ryan Blaney, Christopher Bell, Alex Bowman, and Carson Hocevar rounded out the top ten.

== Report ==
=== Background ===
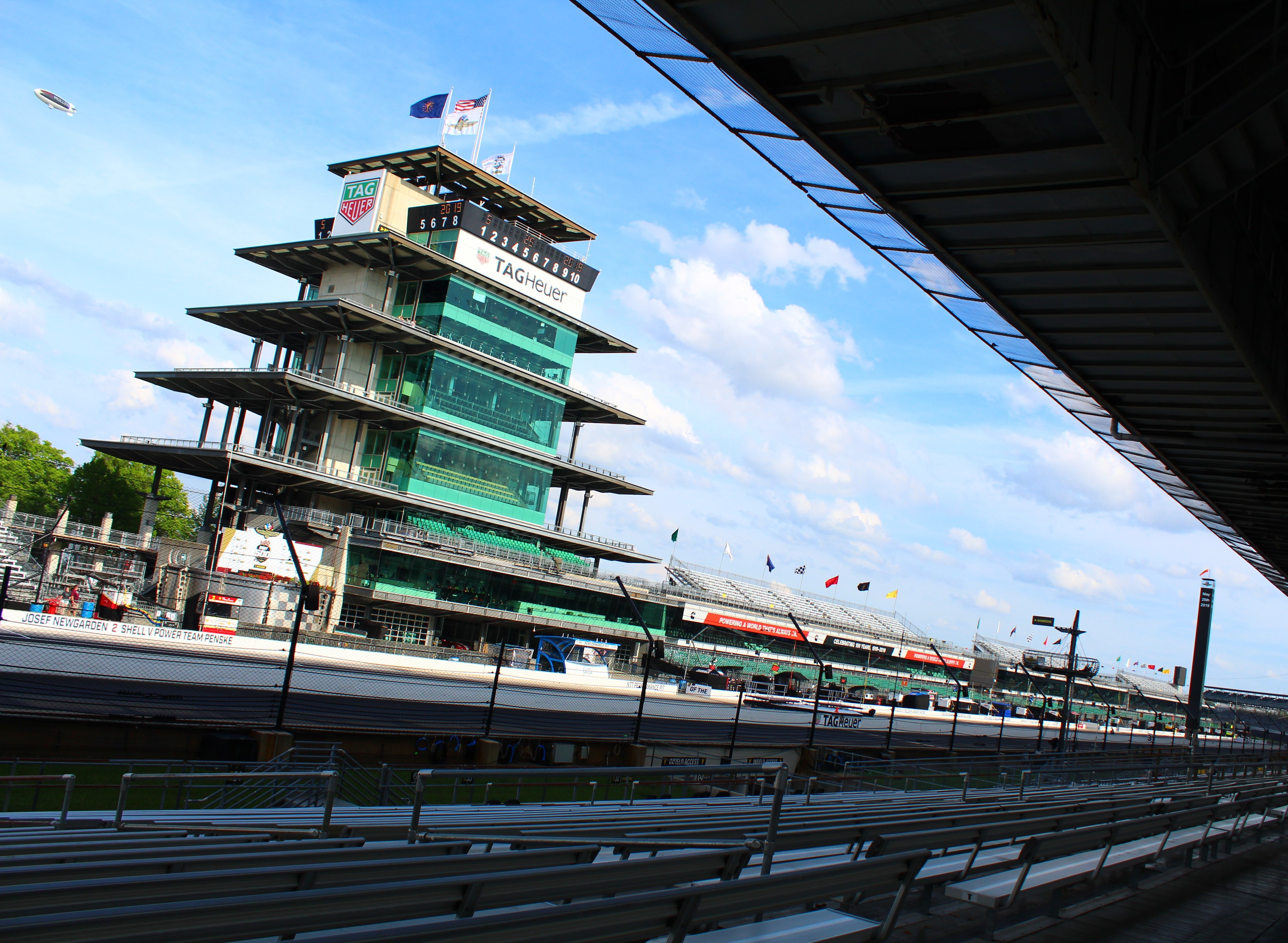
The Pagoda, the control tower, which houses officials, broadcasting, and hospitality suites, is an icon at the Indianapolis Motor Speedway.

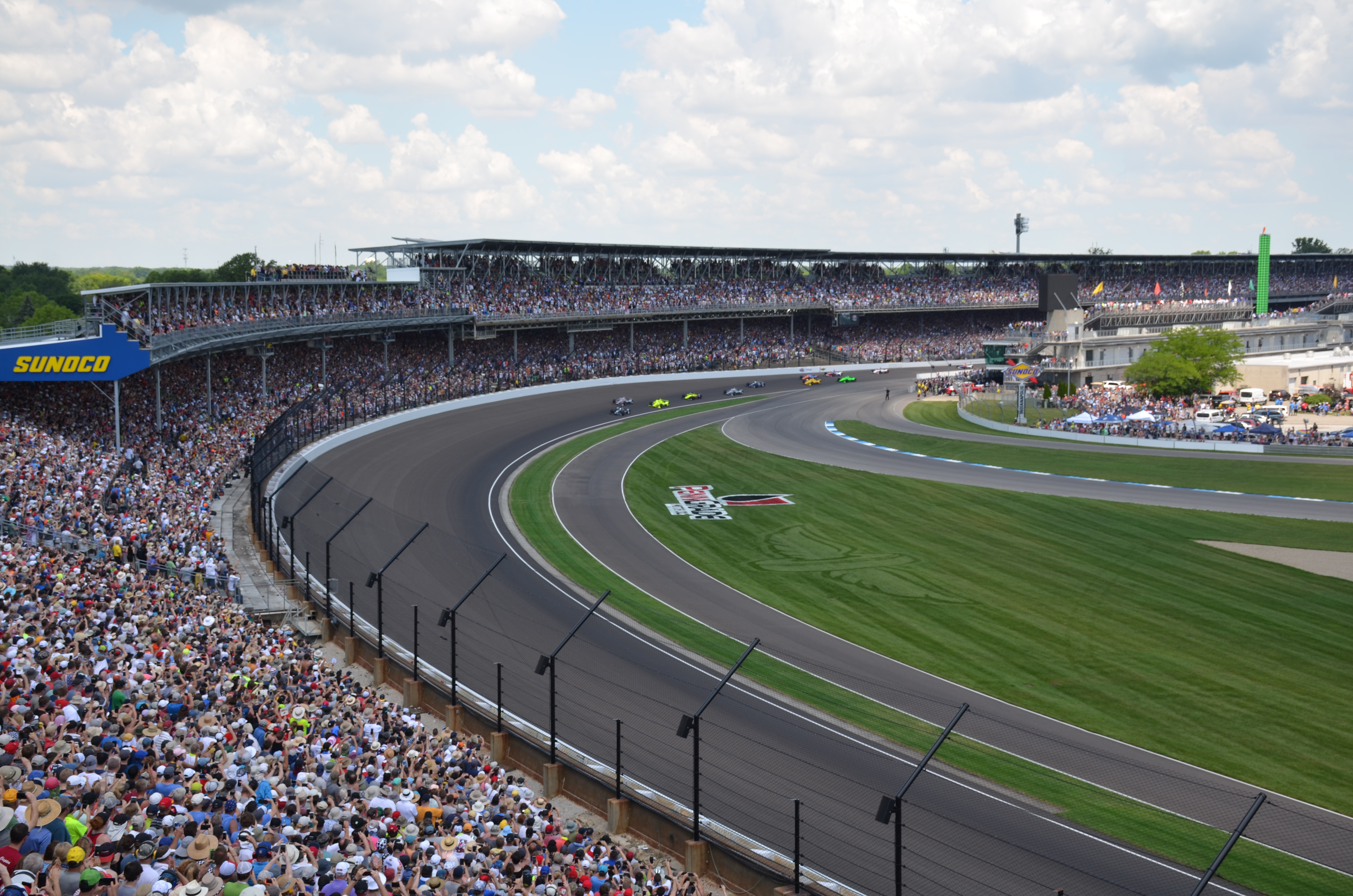
Turn one at the Indianapolis Motor Speedway.

The Indianapolis Motor Speedway, located in Speedway, Indiana, (an enclave suburb of Indianapolis) in the United States, is the home of the Indianapolis 500 and the Brickyard 400. It is located on the corner of 16th Street and Georgetown Road, approximately six miles (10 km) west of Downtown Indianapolis.

Constructed in 1909, it is the original speedway, the first racing facility so named. It has a permanent seating capacity estimated at 235,000 with infield seating raising capacity to an approximate 400,000. It is the highest-capacity sports venue in the world.

Considered relatively flat by American standards, the track is a 2.5-mile (4.0 km), nearly rectangular oval with dimensions that have remained essentially unchanged since its inception: four 0.25-mile (0.40 km) turns, two 0.625-mile-long (1.006 km) straightaways between the fourth and first turns and the second and third turns, and two .125-mile (0.201 km) short straightaways – termed "short chutes" – between the first and second, and third and fourth turns.

The track also holds races on its infield road course, formerly the Verizon 200 at the Brickyard, from 2021 to 2023 and currently the Sonsio Grand Prix.

==== Entry list ====
- (R) denotes rookie driver.
- (i) denotes driver who is ineligible for series driver points.

No.	Driver	Team	Manufacturer
1	Ross Chastain	Trackhouse Racing	Chevrolet
2	Austin Cindric	Team Penske	Ford
3	Austin Dillon	Richard Childress Racing	Chevrolet
4	Noah Gragson	Front Row Motorsports	Ford
5	Kyle Larson	Hendrick Motorsports	Chevrolet
6	Brad Keselowski	RFK Racing	Ford
7	Justin Haley	Spire Motorsports	Chevrolet
8	Kyle Busch	Richard Childress Racing	Chevrolet
9	Chase Elliott	Hendrick Motorsports	Chevrolet
10	Ty Dillon	Kaulig Racing	Chevrolet
11	Denny Hamlin	Joe Gibbs Racing	Toyota
12	Ryan Blaney	Team Penske	Ford
16	A. J. Allmendinger	Kaulig Racing	Chevrolet
17	Chris Buescher	RFK Racing	Ford
19	Chase Briscoe	Joe Gibbs Racing	Toyota
20	Christopher Bell	Joe Gibbs Racing	Toyota
21	Josh Berry	Wood Brothers Racing	Ford
22	Joey Logano	Team Penske	Ford
23	Bubba Wallace	23XI Racing	Toyota
24	William Byron	Hendrick Motorsports	Chevrolet
34	Todd Gilliland	Front Row Motorsports	Ford
35	Riley Herbst (R)	23XI Racing	Toyota
38	Zane Smith	Front Row Motorsports	Ford
41	Cole Custer	Haas Factory Team	Ford
42	John Hunter Nemechek	Legacy Motor Club	Toyota
43	Erik Jones	Legacy Motor Club	Toyota
45	Tyler Reddick	23XI Racing	Toyota
47	Ricky Stenhouse Jr.	Hyak Motorsports	Chevrolet
48	Alex Bowman	Hendrick Motorsports	Chevrolet
51	Cody Ware	Rick Ware Racing	Ford
54	Ty Gibbs	Joe Gibbs Racing	Toyota
60	Ryan Preece	RFK Racing	Ford
62	Jesse Love (i)	Beard Motorsports	Chevrolet
66	Josh Bilicki (i)	Garage 66	Ford
71	Michael McDowell	Spire Motorsports	Chevrolet
77	Carson Hocevar	Spire Motorsports	Chevrolet
78	Katherine Legge	Live Fast Motorsports	Chevrolet
88	Shane van Gisbergen (R)	Trackhouse Racing	Chevrolet
99	Daniel Suárez	Trackhouse Racing	Chevrolet
Official entry list

== Practice ==
Denny Hamlin was the fastest in the practice session with a time of 49.440 seconds and a speed of 182.038 mph (292.962 km/h).

=== Practice results ===
Pos	No.	Driver	Team	Manufacturer	Time	Speed
1	11	Denny Hamlin	Joe Gibbs Racing	Toyota	49.440	182.038
2	42	John Hunter Nemechek	Legacy Motor Club	Toyota	49.510	181.781
3	6	Brad Keselowski	RFK Racing	Ford	49.640	181.305
Official practice results

== Qualifying ==
Chase Briscoe scored the pole for the race with a time of 49.136 and a speed of 183.165 mph (294.775 km/h).

=== Qualifying results ===
Pos	No.	Driver	Team	Manufacturer	Time	Speed
1	19	Chase Briscoe	Joe Gibbs Racing	Toyota	49.136	183.165
2	23	Bubba Wallace	23XI Racing	Toyota	49.149	183.117
3	43	Erik Jones	Legacy Motor Club	Toyota	49.248	182.749
4	45	Tyler Reddick	23XI Racing	Toyota	49.267	182.678
5	54	Ty Gibbs	Joe Gibbs Racing	Toyota	49.330	182.445
6	24	William Byron	Hendrick Motorsports	Chevrolet	49.442	182.031
7	17	Chris Buescher	RFK Racing	Ford	49.447	182.013
8	77	Carson Hocevar	Spire Motorsports	Chevrolet	49.495	181.837
9	16	A. J. Allmendinger	Kaulig Racing	Chevrolet	49.499	181.822
10	2	Austin Cindric	Team Penske	Ford	49.586	181.503
11	88	Shane van Gisbergen (R)	Trackhouse Racing	Chevrolet	49.591	181.485
12	8	Kyle Busch	Richard Childress Racing	Chevrolet	49.595	181.470
13	5	Kyle Larson	Hendrick Motorsports	Chevrolet	49.617	181.389
14	6	Brad Keselowski	RFK Racing	Ford	49.629	181.346
15	22	Joey Logano	Team Penske	Ford	49.693	181.112
16	20	Christopher Bell	Joe Gibbs Racing	Toyota	49.795	180.741
17	21	Josh Berry	Wood Brothers Racing	Ford	49.830	180.614
18	4	Noah Gragson	Front Row Motorsports	Ford	49.894	180.382
19	34	Todd Gilliland	Front Row Motorsports	Ford	49.941	180.213
20	3	Austin Dillon	Richard Childress Racing	Chevrolet	49.949	180.184
21	48	Alex Bowman	Hendrick Motorsports	Chevrolet	49.967	180.119
22	71	Michael McDowell	Spire Motorsports	Chevrolet	49.974	180.094
23	60	Ryan Preece	RFK Racing	Ford	49.979	180.076
24	12	Ryan Blaney	Team Penske	Ford	49.992	180.029
25	35	Riley Herbst (R)	23XI Racing	Toyota	50.012	179.957
26	10	Ty Dillon	Kaulig Racing	Chevrolet	50.051	179.817
27	38	Zane Smith	Front Row Motorsports	Ford	50.061	179.781
28	7	Justin Haley	Spire Motorsports	Chevrolet	50.067	179.759
29	41	Cole Custer	Haas Factory Team	Ford	50.088	179.684
30	9	Chase Elliott	Hendrick Motorsports	Chevrolet	50.114	179.591
31	99	Daniel Suárez	Trackhouse Racing	Chevrolet	50.201	179.279
32	47	Ricky Stenhouse Jr.	Hyak Motorsports	Chevrolet	50.310	178.891
33	1	Ross Chastain	Trackhouse Racing	Chevrolet	50.333	178.809
34	51	Cody Ware	Rick Ware Racing	Ford	50.588	177.908
35	62	Jesse Love (i)	Beard Motorsports	Chevrolet	50.801	177.162
36	42	John Hunter Nemechek	Legacy Motor Club	Toyota	50.989	176.509
37	66	Josh Bilicki (i)	Garage 66	Ford	54.565	164.941
38	78	Katherine Legge	Live Fast Motorsports	Chevrolet	56.963	157.997
39	11	Denny Hamlin	Joe Gibbs Racing	Toyota	0.000	0.000
Official qualifying results

== Race ==
=== Stage 1 ===
Everyone played nice on the first trip into turn 1 as Chase Briscoe drove off into the lead and most of the rest of the field fell into line on the preferred groove at the bottom of the track. Passing is a challenge, Denny Hamlin only advanced six positions in the first 15 laps after starting at the rear of the field in a back-up car.

The first incident of the afternoon featured Ross Chastain checking up, to hard on the brakes, after a block was thrown by Michael McDowell. Chastain spun and hit the outside wall in turn three with severe damage to the right rear of his race car. He drove the car back to pit road but his crew directed him to go behind the wall.

When the pits opened most of the field came to pit road for new right side Goodyear tires. The Ford Mustangs of Austin Cindric, Joey Logano, and Josh Berry stayed out to improve their track position.

On the restart the front of the field reshuffled as drivers were more inclined to go two wide for a couple of laps. Cindric took the lead, Logano dropped in behind his teammate, Briscoe moved up to third, Bubba Wallace ran fourth, and Berry slipped to the fifth spot. By lap 32, Hamlin was up to the 24th position.

As the laps in Stage One wound down, several drivers opted to come to pit road before it was closed with two laps to go. Briscoe stayed on the track to grab the Stage win and the bonus playoff point that goes with it. Hamlin finished the Stage in 18th.

=== Stage 2 ===
Carson Hocevar was the first driver off pit road, but he only took two tires, everyone else took four. Briscoe followed. They lined up behind Ryan Preece, Alex Bowman, Justin Haley, Cindric, Berry, Logano, and Erik Jones. All who pitted early to improve track position.

Preece and Bowman lined up and drive away. Three and four wide racing developed quickly on the straightaways closing down to two-wide in the corners. With position battles settled the long line of cars developed as individual battles settled into one position at a time contests.

Drivers were warned that weather was present in the area and conditions were good for pop-up showers to develop. However, radar showed everything current was passing below the Speedway. At 80 laps the race becomes official and crews were already planning pit strategies for the possibility of rain around the end of the Stage.

Bowman, Preece, and Haley pitted early as soon as the fuel window for 50 laps opened.

More drivers pitted around the 80 lap mark. On lap 83, the leader Austin Cindric, shredded a right rear tires and had to limp all the way around the track to get to pit road. That incident raised concern among crew chiefs and led to more teams calling their drivers to pit road. Cindric lost almost two laps in the process of getting fresh rubber.

Out front, Wallace, Briscoe, Jones, Tyler Reddick and Ryan Blaney were the top five. On lap 88, Erik Jones pitted and his crew failed to get the right front wheel tight. Upon returning to the track, the wheel came loose and lodged between the hub and right front fender, causing Jones to veer into the outside wall bringing out the caution.

A number of drivers were a lap down and had to rely on the “wave around” to get back on the lead lap. Including Ty Dillon who was now a lap behind his In-Season Challenge competitor, Ty Gibbs.

Blaney and Brad Keselowski sat on the front row for the restart. Teammates Byron and Bowman follow as the race goes back to green with five laps to go in the stage. Denny Hamlin restarted in the sixth position.

Blaney pulled away, but was a mad scramble behind him. Kyle Larson moved to second with Hamlin in third as they come to the green and white checkered flag.

=== Final stage ===
Larson, Hamlin, Byron, Hocevar, and Logano line up at the front for the restart. Nobody in the top five jump out of line into turn run. Behind them, three wide racing is back on. 24 cars remain on the lead lap as the race to the finish begins in earnest.

Josh Berry was the first to pit with 44 laps to go, taking right side tires with a full tank of fuel. Logano followed a lap later, with Byron another lap after that. With the leaders employing this early pit strategy, many will follow. While some drivers may choose to gamble hoping for multiple cautions or praying for rain.

Joey Logano had a right rear tire go down with 23 laps to go, forcing him to pit road. To make matters worse his car lost power trying to exit his pit stall.

Ryan Blaney and Katherine Legge were the last two drivers to employ the long run strategy as they remained on the track with 20 laps to go.

==== The Finish ====
With 15 laps to go, all the pit stops had cycled through and Bubba Wallace had migrated to the lead. Larson, Reddick, Byron and Hamlin were the top five. If Wallace can hold on it will jumble the playoff standings entering another winner into those locked into the post season.

Wallace holds a 4.5-second lead over Larson with 10 laps to go. Reddick is another 4-seconds back in third.

William Byron passed Reddick with eight laps to go, but trailed the leader by 10 seconds.

With six laps to go, a lone cloud began to sprinkle rain drops in turn one. If NASCAR brings out the red flag and the race extends into overtime several cars will be in danger of running out of fuel. Including the leader, Bubba Wallace.

With four laps remaining, the pace car led the field down pit road, and the red flag sent the race into overtime. This marks the sixth time in the last eight races that an event has extended into overtime. Prior to the stoppage, Wallace was in a position to secure the victory within an estimated five minutes. Following the restart, any driver currently in the top 15 positions has an opportunity to win. Based on recent trends, there is a strong possibility that multiple overtime attempts will be required to conclude the event.

===== Overtime =====
When the red flag was lifted, the highest running driver to hit pit road was Tyler Reddick from the seventh position. He almost had to come in as he was complaining of a vibration.

Coming to the choose cone the lineup could be very interesting. Wallace(1st) would like his team owner Hamlin(4th) to line up behind him. That may happen if Byron(3rd) choose to help his teammate Larson (2nd). Josh Berry on fifth is the longshot in the first overtime.

Wallace, Byron and Hamlin choose the lower lane. Larson, Berry, and Briscoe take the high side of the track.

Wallace holds off Larson through the first two turns and onto the backstretch. The field negotiates the turns as well. Down the back straight Christopher Bell clipped the car of Zane Smith spinning the Ford around. None of the leaders pit under caution and the top four coming to the choose cone are the same.

Briscoe falls out of line and has to pit for fuel. Inside to outside are Wallace, Byron, and Hamlin down low. Larson, Berry, and Hocevar on the top side.

=== Race results ===
==== Stage Results ====
Stage One Laps: 50

Pos	No	Driver	Team	Manufacturer	Points
1	19	Chase Briscoe	Joe Gibbs Racing	Toyota	10
2	23	Bubba Wallace	23XI Racing	Toyota	9
3	24	William Byron	Hendrick Motorsports	Chevrolet	8
4	45	Tyler Reddick	23XI Racing	Toyota	7
5	17	Chris Buescher	RFK Racing	Ford	6
6	8	Kyle Busch	Richard Childress Racing	Chevrolet	5
7	77	Carson Hocevar	Spire Motorsports	Chevrolet	4
8	5	Kyle Larson	Hendrick Motorsports	Chevrolet	3
9	3	Austin Dillon	Richard Childress Racing	Chevrolet	2
10	16	A. J. Allmendinger	Kaulig Racing	Chevrolet	1
Official stage one results

Stage Two Laps: 50

Pos	No	Driver	Team	Manufacturer	Points
1	12	Ryan Blaney	Team Penske	Ford	10
2	5	Kyle Larson	Hendrick Motorsports	Chevrolet	9
3	11	Denny Hamlin	Joe Gibbs Racing	Toyota	8
4	24	William Byron	Hendrick Motorsports	Chevrolet	7
5	6	Brad Keselowski	RFK Racing	Ford	6
6	48	Alex Bowman	Hendrick Motorsports	Chevrolet	5
7	77	Carson Hocevar	Spire Motorsports	Chevrolet	4
8	22	Joey Logano	Team Penske	Ford	3
9	17	Chris Buescher	RFK Racing	Ford	2
10	23	Bubba Wallace	23XI Racing	Toyota	1
Official stage two results

=== Final Stage Results ===
Stage Three Laps: 60

Pos	Grid	No	Driver	Team	Manufacturer	Laps	Points
1	2	23	Bubba Wallace	23XI Racing	Toyota	168	50
2	13	5	Kyle Larson	Hendrick Motorsports	Chevrolet	168	47
3	39	11	Denny Hamlin	Joe Gibbs Racing	Toyota	168	43
4	23	60	Ryan Preece	RFK Racing	Ford	168	33
5	14	6	Brad Keselowski	RFK Racing	Ford	168	38
6	19	34	Todd Gilliland	Front Row Motorsports	Ford	168	31
7	24	12	Ryan Blaney	Team Penske	Ford	168	40
8	16	20	Christopher Bell	Joe Gibbs Racing	Toyota	168	29
9	21	48	Alex Bowman	Hendrick Motorsports	Chevrolet	168	33
10	8	77	Carson Hocevar	Spire Motorsports	Chevrolet	168	35
11	28	7	Justin Haley	Spire Motorsports	Chevrolet	168	26
12	36	42	John Hunter Nemechek	Legacy Motor Club	Toyota	168	25
13	30	9	Chase Elliott	Hendrick Motorsports	Chevrolet	168	24
14	7	17	Chris Buescher	RFK Racing	Ford	168	31
15	10	2	Austin Cindric	Team Penske	Ford	168	22
16	6	24	William Byron	Hendrick Motorsports	Chevrolet	168	36
17	38	78	Katherine Legge	Live Fast Motorsports	Chevrolet	168	20
18	1	19	Chase Briscoe	Joe Gibbs Racing	Toyota	168	29
19	11	88	Shane van Gisbergen (R)	Trackhouse Racing	Chevrolet	168	18
20	29	41	Cole Custer	Haas Factory Team	Ford	168	17
21	5	54	Ty Gibbs	Joe Gibbs Racing	Toyota	168	16
22	17	21	Josh Berry	Wood Brothers Racing	Ford	168	15
23	9	16	A. J. Allmendinger	Kaulig Racing	Chevrolet	167	15
24	35	62	Jesse Love (i)	Beard Motorsports	Chevrolet	167	0
25	12	8	Kyle Busch	Richard Childress Racing	Chevrolet	166	17
26	25	35	Riley Herbst (R)	23XI Racing	Toyota	166	11
27	31	99	Daniel Suárez	Trackhouse Racing	Chevrolet	165	10
28	26	10	Ty Dillon	Kaulig Racing	Chevrolet	165	9
29	4	45	Tyler Reddick	23XI Racing	Toyota	163	15
30	22	71	Michael McDowell	Spire Motorsports	Chevrolet	162	7
31	27	38	Zane Smith	Front Row Motorsports	Ford	161	6
32	15	22	Joey Logano	Team Penske	Ford	160	8
33	18	4	Noah Gragson	Front Row Motorsports	Ford	153	4
34	37	66	Josh Bilicki (i)	Garage 66	Ford	125	0
35	32	47	Ricky Stenhouse Jr.	Hyak Motorsports	Chevrolet	101	2
36	3	43	Erik Jones	Legacy Motor Club	Toyota	89	1
37	34	51	Cody Ware	Rick Ware Racing	Ford	58	1
38	20	3	Austin Dillon	Richard Childress Racing	Chevrolet	56	3
39	33	1	Ross Chastain	Trackhouse Racing	Chevrolet	16	1
Official race results

=== Race statistics ===
- Lead changes: 15 among 10 different drivers
- Cautions/Laps: 6 for 28
- Red flags: 1 for 18 minutes and 12 seconds
- Time of race: 3 hours, 22 minutes and 15 seconds
- Average speed: 124.598 miles per hour (200.521 km/h)

== Media ==
=== Television ===
TNT covered the race on the television side. Adam Alexander, Dale Earnhardt Jr. and Steve Letarte called the race from the broadcast booth. Marty Snider, Danielle Trotta, Alan Cavanna, and Mamba Smith handled pit road for the television side.

TNT
Booth announcers	Pit reporters
Lap-by-lap: Adam Alexander; Color-commentator: Dale Earnhardt Jr. Color-commentator: Steve Letarte	Marty Snider; Danielle Trotta; Alan Cavanna; Mamba Smith

=== Radio ===
Indianapolis Motor Speedway Radio Network had the radio call for the race, which was also simulcast on Sirius XM NASCAR Radio. For the first time, members of the Motor Racing Network were part of the network crew, along with IMS Radio and Performance Racing Network personnel.

IMS Radio
Booth announcers	Turn announcers	Pit reporters
Lead announcer: Brad Gillie; Announcer: Nick Yeoman	Turn 1: Alex Hayden; Turn 2: Michael Young; Turn 3: Pat Patterson; Turn 4: Chris Wilner	Brett McMillan; Rich Nye; Jason Toy

== Standings after the race ==
Drivers' Championship standings

	Pos	Driver	Points
	1	Chase Elliott	726
	2	William Byron	722 (–4)
	3	Kyle Larson	711 (–15)
	4	Denny Hamlin	706 (–20)
1	5	Christopher Bell	664 (–62)
1	6	Tyler Reddick	655 (–71)
	7	Ryan Blaney	616 (–110)
	8	Chase Briscoe	599 (–127)
	9	Alex Bowman	580 (–146)
	10	Chris Buescher	559 (–167)
2	11	Bubba Wallace	550 (–176)
1	12	Joey Logano	532 (–194)
1	13	Ross Chastain	518 (–208)
	14	Ryan Preece	517 (–209)
	15	Kyle Busch	478 (–248)
	16	Ty Gibbs	464 (–262)
Official driver's standings

Manufacturers' Championship standings

Pos	Manufacturer	Points
1	Chevrolet	805
2	Toyota	791 (–14)
3	Ford	730 (–75)

- Note: Only the first 16 positions are included for the driver standings.
- . – Driver has clinched a position in the NASCAR Cup Series playoffs.

=== NASCAR In-Season Challenge bracket ===
Atlanta
1	#11 Denny Hamlin	31st
32	#10 Ty Dillon	8th
16	#8 Kyle Busch	21st
17	#6 Brad Keselowski	2nd
8	#48 Alex Bowman	3rd
25	#22 Joey Logano	25th
9	#23 Bubba Wallace	22nd
24	#99 Daniel Suárez	34th
12	#42 John Hunter Nemechek	26th
21	#21 Josh Berry	32nd
5	#9 Chase Elliott	1st
28	#3 Austin Dillon	20th
13	#1 Ross Chastain	33rd
20	#43 Erik Jones	5th
4	#20 Christopher Bell	30th
29	#47 Ricky Stenhouse Jr.	6th
2	#19 Chase Briscoe	35th
31	#4 Noah Gragson	25th
15	#60 Ryan Preece	15th
18	#24 William Byron	37th
7	#12 Ryan Blaney	40th
26	#77 Carson Hocevar	10th
10	#5 Kyle Larson	17th
23	#45 Tyler Reddick	4th
11	#71 Michael McDowell	18th
22	#16 A. J. Allmendinger	12th
6	#54 Ty Gibbs	14th
27	#7 Justin Haley	23rd
14	#38 Zane Smith	7th
19	#2 Austin Cindric	38th
3	#17 Chris Buescher	9th
30	#34 Todd Gilliland	27th

Chicago
32	#10 Ty Dillon	20th
17	#6 Keselowski	37th
8	#48 Bowman	8th
9	#23 Wallace	28th
12	#42 Nemechek	15th
5	#9 Elliott	16th
20	#43 Jones	25th
29	#47 Stenhouse Jr.	31st
31	#4 Gragson	30th
15	#60 Preece	7th
26	#77 Hocevar	35th
23	#45 Reddick	3rd
22	#16 Allmendinger	6th
6	#54 Gibbs	2nd
14	#38 Smith	14th
3	#17 Buescher	18th

Sonoma
32	#10 Ty Dillon	17th
8	#48 Bowman	19th
12	#42 Nemechek	28th
20	#43 Jones	29th
15	#60 Preece	12th
23	#45 Reddick	6th
6	#54 Gibbs	7th
14	#38 Smith	27th

Dover
32	#10 Ty Dillon	20th
12	#42 Nemechek	21st
23	#45 Reddick	12th
6	#54 Gibbs	5th

Indianapolis
32	#10 Ty Dillon	28th
6	#54 Gibbs	21st

Previous race: 2025 Autotrader EchoPark Automotive 400	NASCAR Cup Series; 2025 season	Next race: 2025 Iowa Corn 350
