= 2025 Toyota/Save Mart 350 =

NASCAR stock car race held in Sonoma, California, U.S.

Race details
- Race 20 of 36 in the 2025 NASCAR Cup Series
- Date: July 13, 2025
- Location: Sonoma Raceway in Sonoma, California
- Course: Permanent racing facility
- Course length: 1.99 miles (3.20 km)
- Distance: 110 laps, 218.9 mi (352.285 km)
- Average speed: 75.087 miles per hour (120.841 km/h)

Pole position
Driver	Shane van Gisbergen	Trackhouse Racing
- Time: 1:14.594

Most laps led
Driver	Shane van Gisbergen	Trackhouse Racing
- Laps: 97

Fastest lap
Driver	Justin Haley	Spire Motorsports
- Time: 75.988

Winner
No. 88	Shane van Gisbergen	Trackhouse Racing

Television in the United States
- Network: TNT
- Announcers: Adam Alexander, Dale Earnhardt Jr., and Steve Letarte

Radio in the United States
- Radio: PRN
- Booth announcers: Brad Gillie and Mark Garrow
- Turn announcers: Pat Patterson (2, 3, & 3a), Nick Yeoman (4a & 7a), and Rob Albright (10 & 11)

The 2025 Toyota/Save Mart 350 was a NASCAR Cup Series race held on July 13, 2025, at Sonoma Raceway in Sonoma, California. Contested over 110 laps on the 1.99-mile (3.20 km) road course, it was the 20th race of the 2025 NASCAR Cup Series season, as well as the third race of the inaugural NASCAR In-Season Challenge.

Shane van Gisbergen won the race. Chase Briscoe finished 2nd, and Chase Elliott finished 3rd. Michael McDowell and Christopher Bell rounded out the top five, and Tyler Reddick, Ty Gibbs, William Byron, Joey Logano, and Kyle Busch rounded out the top ten.

== Report ==
=== Background ===
Layout of Sonoma Raceway, the track where the race was held.

Sonoma Raceway is a 1.99-mile (3.20 km) road course and drag strip located on the landform known as Sears Point in the southern Sonoma Mountains in Sonoma, California, U.S. The road course features 12 turns on a hilly course with 160 feet (49 m) of total elevation change. It is host to one of only seven NASCAR Cup Series races each year that are run on road courses. It is also host to the NTT IndyCar Series and several other auto races and motorcycle races such as the American Federation of Motorcyclists series. Sonoma Raceway continues to host amateur, or club racing events which may or may not be open to the general public. The largest such car club is the Sports Car Club of America. In 2022, the race was reverted to racing the club configuration.

==== Entry list ====
- (R) denotes rookie driver.
- (i) denotes driver who is ineligible for series driver points.

No.	Driver	Team	Manufacturer
1	Ross Chastain	Trackhouse Racing	Chevrolet
2	Austin Cindric	Team Penske	Ford
3	Austin Dillon	Richard Childress Racing	Chevrolet
4	Noah Gragson	Front Row Motorsports	Ford
5	Kyle Larson	Hendrick Motorsports	Chevrolet
6	Brad Keselowski	RFK Racing	Ford
7	Justin Haley	Spire Motorsports	Chevrolet
8	Kyle Busch	Richard Childress Racing	Chevrolet
9	Chase Elliott	Hendrick Motorsports	Chevrolet
10	Ty Dillon	Kaulig Racing	Chevrolet
11	Denny Hamlin	Joe Gibbs Racing	Toyota
12	Ryan Blaney	Team Penske	Ford
16	A. J. Allmendinger	Kaulig Racing	Chevrolet
17	Chris Buescher	RFK Racing	Ford
19	Chase Briscoe	Joe Gibbs Racing	Toyota
20	Christopher Bell	Joe Gibbs Racing	Toyota
21	Josh Berry	Wood Brothers Racing	Ford
22	Joey Logano	Team Penske	Ford
23	Bubba Wallace	23XI Racing	Toyota
24	William Byron	Hendrick Motorsports	Chevrolet
34	Todd Gilliland	Front Row Motorsports	Ford
35	Riley Herbst (R)	23XI Racing	Toyota
38	Zane Smith	Front Row Motorsports	Ford
41	Cole Custer	Haas Factory Team	Ford
42	John Hunter Nemechek	Legacy Motor Club	Toyota
43	Erik Jones	Legacy Motor Club	Toyota
45	Tyler Reddick	23XI Racing	Toyota
47	Ricky Stenhouse Jr.	Hyak Motorsports	Chevrolet
48	Alex Bowman	Hendrick Motorsports	Chevrolet
51	Cody Ware	Rick Ware Racing	Ford
54	Ty Gibbs	Joe Gibbs Racing	Toyota
60	Ryan Preece	RFK Racing	Ford
71	Michael McDowell	Spire Motorsports	Chevrolet
77	Carson Hocevar	Spire Motorsports	Chevrolet
78	Katherine Legge	Live Fast Motorsports	Chevrolet
88	Shane van Gisbergen (R)	Trackhouse Racing	Chevrolet
99	Daniel Suárez	Trackhouse Racing	Chevrolet
Official entry list

== Practice ==
A. J. Allmendinger was the fastest in the practice session with a time of 1:15.950 seconds and a speed of 94.325 mph (151.801 km/h).

=== Practice results ===
Pos	No.	Driver	Team	Manufacturer	Time	Speed
1	16	A. J. Allmendinger	Kaulig Racing	Chevrolet	1:15.950	94.325
2	54	Ty Gibbs	Joe Gibbs Racing	Toyota	1:16.193	94.024
3	88	Shane van Gisbergen (R)	Trackhouse Racing	Chevrolet	1:16.241	93.965
Official practice results

== Qualifying ==
Shane van Gisbergen scored the pole for the race with a time of 1:14.594 and a speed of 96.040 mph (154.561 km/h).

=== Qualifying results ===
Pos	No.	Driver	Team	Manufacturer	Time	Speed
1	88	Shane van Gisbergen (R)	Trackhouse Racing	Chevrolet	1:14.594	96.040
2	19	Chase Briscoe	Joe Gibbs Racing	Toyota	1:14.844	95.719
3	24	William Byron	Hendrick Motorsports	Chevrolet	1:15.025	95.488
4	1	Ross Chastain	Trackhouse Racing	Chevrolet	1:15.087	95.409
5	16	A. J. Allmendinger	Kaulig Racing	Chevrolet	1:15.120	95.367
6	54	Ty Gibbs	Joe Gibbs Racing	Toyota	1:15.128	95.357
7	12	Ryan Blaney	Team Penske	Ford	1:15.134	95.350
8	45	Tyler Reddick	23XI Racing	Toyota	1:15.176	95.296
9	48	Alex Bowman	Hendrick Motorsports	Chevrolet	1:15.233	95.224
10	20	Christopher Bell	Joe Gibbs Racing	Toyota	1:15.243	95.212
11	5	Kyle Larson	Hendrick Motorsports	Chevrolet	1:15.254	95.198
12	38	Zane Smith	Front Row Motorsports	Ford	1:15.278	95.167
13	9	Chase Elliott	Hendrick Motorsports	Chevrolet	1:15.283	95.161
14	17	Chris Buescher	RFK Racing	Ford	1:15.373	95.047
15	71	Michael McDowell	Spire Motorsports	Chevrolet	1:15.408	95.003
16	11	Denny Hamlin	Joe Gibbs Racing	Toyota	1:15.437	94.967
17	8	Kyle Busch	Richard Childress Racing	Chevrolet	1:15.475	94.919
18	42	John Hunter Nemechek	Legacy Motor Club	Toyota	1:15.517	94.866
19	99	Daniel Suárez	Trackhouse Racing	Chevrolet	1:15.563	94.808
20	60	Ryan Preece	RFK Racing	Ford	1:15.589	94.776
21	6	Brad Keselowski	RFK Racing	Ford	1:15.624	94.732
22	22	Joey Logano	Team Penske	Ford	1:15.629	94.726
23	77	Carson Hocevar	Spire Motorsports	Chevrolet	1:15.666	94.679
24	2	Austin Cindric	Team Penske	Ford	1:15.734	94.594
25	21	Josh Berry	Wood Brothers Racing	Ford	1:15.836	94.467
26	10	Ty Dillon	Kaulig Racing	Chevrolet	1:16.033	94.222
27	41	Cole Custer	Haas Factory Team	Ford	1:16.122	94.112
28	35	Riley Herbst (R)	23XI Racing	Toyota	1:16.254	93.949
29	7	Justin Haley	Spire Motorsports	Chevrolet	1:16.270	93.929
30	23	Bubba Wallace	23XI Racing	Toyota	1:16.275	93.923
31	43	Erik Jones	Legacy Motor Club	Toyota	1:16.297	93.896
32	4	Noah Gragson	Front Row Motorsports	Ford	1:16.299	93.894
33	3	Austin Dillon	Richard Childress Racing	Chevrolet	1:16.461	93.695
34	47	Ricky Stenhouse Jr.	Hyak Motorsports	Chevrolet	1:16.623	93.497
35	34	Todd Gilliland	Front Row Motorsports	Ford	1:16.732	93.364
36	51	Cody Ware	Rick Ware Racing	Ford	1:17.478	92.465
37	78	Katherine Legge	Live Fast Motorsports	Chevrolet	0.000	0.000
Official qualifying results

== Race ==
=== Race results ===
==== Stage Results ====
Stage One Laps: 25

Pos	No	Driver	Team	Manufacturer	Points
1	1	Ross Chastain	Trackhouse Racing	Chevrolet	10
2	88	Shane van Gisbergen (R)	Trackhouse Racing	Chevrolet	9
3	23	Bubba Wallace	23XI Racing	Toyota	8
4	47	Ricky Stenhouse Jr.	Hyak Motorsports	Chevrolet	7
5	24	William Byron	Hendrick Motorsports	Chevrolet	6
6	10	Ty Dillon	Kaulig Racing	Chevrolet	5
7	19	Chase Briscoe	Joe Gibbs Racing	Toyota	4
8	12	Ryan Blaney	Team Penske	Ford	3
9	54	Ty Gibbs	Joe Gibbs Racing	Toyota	2
10	9	Chase Elliott	Hendrick Motorsports	Chevrolet	1
Official stage one results

Stage Two Laps: 30

Pos	No	Driver	Team	Manufacturer	Points
1	88	Shane van Gisbergen (R)	Trackhouse Racing	Chevrolet	10
2	5	Kyle Larson	Hendrick Motorsports	Chevrolet	9
3	8	Kyle Busch	Richard Childress Racing	Chevrolet	8
4	23	Bubba Wallace	23XI Racing	Toyota	7
5	47	Ricky Stenhouse Jr.	Hyak Motorsports	Chevrolet	6
6	19	Chase Briscoe	Joe Gibbs Racing	Toyota	5
7	10	Ty Dillon	Kaulig Racing	Chevrolet	4
8	17	Chris Buescher	RFK Racing	Ford	3
9	12	Ryan Blaney	Team Penske	Ford	2
10	24	William Byron	Hendrick Motorsports	Chevrolet	1
Official stage two results

=== Final Stage Results ===
Stage Three Laps: 55

Pos	Grid	No	Driver	Team	Manufacturer	Laps	Points
1	1	88	Shane van Gisbergen (R)	Trackhouse Racing	Chevrolet	110	59
2	2	19	Chase Briscoe	Joe Gibbs Racing	Toyota	110	44
3	13	9	Chase Elliott	Hendrick Motorsports	Chevrolet	110	35
4	15	71	Michael McDowell	Spire Motorsports	Chevrolet	110	33
5	10	20	Christopher Bell	Joe Gibbs Racing	Toyota	110	32
6	8	45	Tyler Reddick	23XI Racing	Toyota	110	31
7	6	54	Ty Gibbs	Joe Gibbs Racing	Toyota	110	32
8	3	24	William Byron	Hendrick Motorsports	Chevrolet	110	36
9	22	22	Joey Logano	Team Penske	Ford	110	28
10	17	8	Kyle Busch	Richard Childress Racing	Chevrolet	110	35
11	21	6	Brad Keselowski	RFK Racing	Ford	110	26
12	20	60	Ryan Preece	RFK Racing	Ford	110	25
13	25	21	Josh Berry	Wood Brothers Racing	Ford	110	24
14	19	99	Daniel Suárez	Trackhouse Racing	Chevrolet	110	23
15	29	7	Justin Haley	Spire Motorsports	Chevrolet	110	23
16	14	17	Chris Buescher	RFK Racing	Ford	110	23
17	26	10	Ty Dillon	Kaulig Racing	Chevrolet	110	29
18	5	16	A. J. Allmendinger	Kaulig Racing	Chevrolet	110	19
19	9	48	Alex Bowman	Hendrick Motorsports	Chevrolet	110	18
20	16	11	Denny Hamlin	Joe Gibbs Racing	Toyota	110	17
21	33	3	Austin Dillon	Richard Childress Racing	Chevrolet	110	16
22	35	34	Todd Gilliland	Front Row Motorsports	Ford	110	15
23	27	41	Cole Custer	Haas Factory Team	Ford	110	14
24	4	1	Ross Chastain	Trackhouse Racing	Chevrolet	110	23
25	28	35	Riley Herbst (R)	23XI Racing	Toyota	110	12
26	30	23	Bubba Wallace	23XI Racing	Toyota	110	26
27	12	38	Zane Smith	Front Row Motorsports	Ford	110	10
28	18	42	John Hunter Nemechek	Legacy Motor Club	Toyota	110	9
29	31	43	Erik Jones	Legacy Motor Club	Toyota	110	8
30	24	2	Austin Cindric	Team Penske	Ford	110	7
31	37	78	Katherine Legge	Live Fast Motorsports	Chevrolet	110	6
32	23	77	Carson Hocevar	Spire Motorsports	Chevrolet	110	5
33	34	47	Ricky Stenhouse Jr.	Hyak Motorsports	Chevrolet	110	17
34	36	51	Cody Ware	Rick Ware Racing	Ford	108	3
35	11	5	Kyle Larson	Hendrick Motorsports	Chevrolet	108	11
36	7	12	Ryan Blaney	Team Penske	Ford	106	6
37	32	4	Noah Gragson	Front Row Motorsports	Ford	99	1
Official race results

=== Race statistics ===
- Lead changes: 12 among 6 different drivers
- Cautions/Laps: 6 for 17 laps
- Red flags: 0
- Time of race: 2 hours, 54 minutes and 55 seconds
- Average speed: 75.087 miles per hour (120.841 km/h)

== Media ==
=== Television ===
TNT covered the race on the television side. Adam Alexander, Dale Earnhardt Jr. and Steve Letarte called the race from the broadcast booth. Marty Snider, Danielle Trotta, Alan Cavanna and Mamba Smith handled pit road for the television side.

TNT
Booth announcers	Pit reporters
Lap-by-lap: Adam Alexander; Color-commentator: Dale Earnhardt Jr. Color-commentator: Steve Letarte	Marty Snider; Danielle Trotta; Alan Cavanna; Mamba Smith

=== Radio ===
The race was broadcast on radio by the Performance Racing Network and simulcast on Sirius XM NASCAR Radio. Brad Gillie and Mark Garrow called the race in the booth while the field was racing on the pit straightaway. Pat Patterson called the race from a stand outside of turn 2 when the field was racing up turns 2, 3 and 3a. Nick Yeoman called the race from a stand outside of turn 7a when the field was racing through turns 4a and 7a. Rob Albright called the race from a billboard outside turn 11 when the field was racing through turns 10 and 11. Brett McMillan, Heather DeBeaux and Wendy Venturini reported from pit lane during the race.

PRN
Booth announcers	Turn announcers	Pit reporters
Lead announcer: Brad Gillie; Announcer: Mark Garrow	Turns 2, 3 & 3a: Pat Patterson; Turns 4a & 7a: Nick Yeoman; Turns 10 & 11: Rob Albright	Brett McMillan; Heather DeBeaux; Wendy Venturini

== Standings after the race ==
Drivers' Championship standings

	Pos	Driver	Points
	1	William Byron	668
	2	Chase Elliott	654 (–14)
	3	Kyle Larson	624 (–44)
1	4	Tyler Reddick	615 (–53)
1	5	Denny Hamlin	606 (–62)
	6	Christopher Bell	597 (–71)
	7	Ryan Blaney	545 (–123)
1	8	Chase Briscoe	526 (–142)
1	9	Ross Chastain	513 (–155)
1	10	Chris Buescher	500 (–168)
1	11	Joey Logano	499 (–169)
2	12	Alex Bowman	498 (–170)
	13	Bubba Wallace	469 (–199)
	14	Ryan Preece	466 (–202)
1	15	Kyle Busch	432 (–236)
1	16	A. J. Allmendinger	419 (–249)
Official driver's standings

Manufacturers' Championship standings

Pos	Manufacturer	Points
1	Chevrolet	736
2	Toyota	711 (–25)
3	Ford	668 (–68)

- Note: Only the first 16 positions are included for the driver standings.
- . – Driver has clinched a position in the NASCAR Cup Series playoffs.

=== NASCAR In-Season Challenge bracket ===
Atlanta
1	#11 Denny Hamlin	31st
32	#10 Ty Dillon	8th
16	#8 Kyle Busch	21st
17	#6 Brad Keselowski	2nd
8	#48 Alex Bowman	3rd
25	#22 Joey Logano	25th
9	#23 Bubba Wallace	22nd
24	#99 Daniel Suárez	34th
12	#42 John Hunter Nemechek	26th
21	#21 Josh Berry	32nd
5	#9 Chase Elliott	1st
28	#3 Austin Dillon	20th
13	#1 Ross Chastain	33rd
20	#43 Erik Jones	5th
4	#20 Christopher Bell	30th
29	#47 Ricky Stenhouse Jr.	6th
2	#19 Chase Briscoe	35th
31	#4 Noah Gragson	25th
15	#60 Ryan Preece	15th
18	#24 William Byron	37th
7	#12 Ryan Blaney	40th
26	#77 Carson Hocevar	10th
10	#5 Kyle Larson	17th
23	#45 Tyler Reddick	4th
11	#71 Michael McDowell	18th
22	#16 A. J. Allmendinger	12th
6	#54 Ty Gibbs	14th
27	#7 Justin Haley	23rd
14	#38 Zane Smith	7th
19	#2 Austin Cindric	38th
3	#17 Chris Buescher	9th
30	#34 Todd Gilliland	27th

Chicago
32	#10 Ty Dillon	20th
17	#6 Keselowski	37th
8	#48 Bowman	8th
9	#23 Wallace	28th
12	#42 Nemechek	15th
5	#9 Elliott	16th
20	#43 Jones	25th
29	#47 Stenhouse Jr.	31st
31	#4 Gragson	30th
15	#60 Preece	7th
26	#77 Hocevar	35th
23	#45 Reddick	3rd
22	#16 Allmendinger	6th
6	#54 Gibbs	2nd
14	#38 Smith	14th
3	#17 Buescher	18th

Sonoma
32	#10 Ty Dillon	17th
8	#48 Bowman	19th
12	#42 Nemechek	28th
20	#43 Jones	29th
15	#60 Preece	12th
23	#45 Reddick	6th
6	#54 Gibbs	7th
14	#38 Smith	27th

Dover
32	#10 Ty Dillon	20th
12	#42 Nemechek	21st
23	#45 Reddick	12th
6	#54 Gibbs	5th

Indianapolis
32	#10 Ty Dillon	28th
6	#54 Gibbs	21st

Previous race: 2025 Grant Park 165	NASCAR Cup Series; 2025 season	Next race: 2025 Autotrader EchoPark Automotive 400
