= 2025 Autotrader EchoPark Automotive 400 =

NASCAR stock car race held in Dover, Delaware, U.S.

Race details
- Race 21 of 36 in the 2025 NASCAR Cup Series
- Date: July 20, 2025
- Location: Dover Motor Speedway in Dover, Delaware
- Course: Permanent racing facility
- Course length: 1 miles (1.6 km)
- Distance: 407 laps, 407 mi (651.2 km)
- Scheduled distance: 400 laps, 400 mi (640 km)
- Average speed: 110.849 miles per hour (178.394 km/h)

Pole position
Driver	Chase Elliott	Hendrick Motorsports
- Time: 2.700 (Pandemic Formula)

Most laps led
Driver	Chase Elliott	Hendrick Motorsports
- Laps: 238

Fastest lap
Driver	Denny Hamlin	Joe Gibbs Racing
- Time: 23.244

Winner
No. 11	Denny Hamlin	Joe Gibbs Racing

Television in the United States
- Network: TNT
- Announcers: Adam Alexander, Dale Earnhardt Jr., and Steve Letarte

Radio in the United States
- Radio: PRN
- Booth announcers: Brad Gillie and Mark Garrow
- Turn announcers: Pat Patterson (1 & 2) and Doug Turnbull (3 & 4)

The 2025 Autotrader EchoPark Automotive 400 was a NASCAR Cup Series race held on July 20, 2025, at Dover Motor Speedway in Dover, Delaware. Contested over 407 laps on the 1-mile (1.6 km) concrete oval, extended from 400 laps due to an overtime finish, it was the 21st race of the 2025 NASCAR Cup Series season, as well as the fourth race of the inaugural NASCAR In-Season Challenge.

Denny Hamlin won the race. Chase Briscoe finished 2nd, and Alex Bowman finished 3rd. Kyle Larson and Ty Gibbs rounded out the top five, and Chase Elliott, Bubba Wallace, Ryan Blaney, Chris Buescher, and Brad Keselowski rounded out the top ten.

== Report ==
=== Background ===
Dover Motor Speedway, the track where the race was held.

Dover Motor Speedway is an oval race track in Dover, Delaware, United States that has held at least two NASCAR races since it opened in 1969. In addition to NASCAR, the track also hosted USAC and the NTT IndyCar Series. The track features one layout, a 1 mile (1.6 km) concrete oval, with 24° banking in the turns and 9° banking on the straights. The speedway is owned and operated by Speedway Motorsports.

The track, nicknamed "The Monster Mile", was built in 1969 by Melvin Joseph of Melvin L. Joseph Construction Company, Inc., with an asphalt surface, but was replaced with concrete in 1995. Six years later in 2001, the track's capacity moved to 135,000 seats, making the track have the largest capacity of sports venue in the mid-Atlantic. In 2002, the name changed to Dover International Speedway from Dover Downs International Speedway after Dover Downs Gaming and Entertainment split, making Dover Motorsports. From 2007 to 2009, the speedway worked on an improvement project called "The Monster Makeover", which expanded facilities at the track and beautified the track. After the 2014 season, the track's capacity was reduced to 95,500 seats.

==== Entry list ====
- (R) denotes rookie driver.
- (i) denotes driver who is ineligible for series driver points.

No.	Driver	Team	Manufacturer
1	Ross Chastain	Trackhouse Racing	Chevrolet
2	Austin Cindric	Team Penske	Ford
3	Austin Dillon	Richard Childress Racing	Chevrolet
4	Noah Gragson	Front Row Motorsports	Ford
5	Kyle Larson	Hendrick Motorsports	Chevrolet
6	Brad Keselowski	RFK Racing	Ford
7	Justin Haley	Spire Motorsports	Chevrolet
8	Kyle Busch	Richard Childress Racing	Chevrolet
9	Chase Elliott	Hendrick Motorsports	Chevrolet
10	Ty Dillon	Kaulig Racing	Chevrolet
11	Denny Hamlin	Joe Gibbs Racing	Toyota
12	Ryan Blaney	Team Penske	Ford
16	A. J. Allmendinger	Kaulig Racing	Chevrolet
17	Chris Buescher	RFK Racing	Ford
19	Chase Briscoe	Joe Gibbs Racing	Toyota
20	Christopher Bell	Joe Gibbs Racing	Toyota
21	Josh Berry	Wood Brothers Racing	Ford
22	Joey Logano	Team Penske	Ford
23	Bubba Wallace	23XI Racing	Toyota
24	William Byron	Hendrick Motorsports	Chevrolet
34	Todd Gilliland	Front Row Motorsports	Ford
35	Riley Herbst (R)	23XI Racing	Toyota
38	Zane Smith	Front Row Motorsports	Ford
41	Cole Custer	Haas Factory Team	Ford
42	John Hunter Nemechek	Legacy Motor Club	Toyota
43	Erik Jones	Legacy Motor Club	Toyota
44	J. J. Yeley (i)	NY Racing Team	Chevrolet
45	Tyler Reddick	23XI Racing	Toyota
47	Ricky Stenhouse Jr.	Hyak Motorsports	Chevrolet
48	Alex Bowman	Hendrick Motorsports	Chevrolet
51	Cody Ware	Rick Ware Racing	Ford
54	Ty Gibbs	Joe Gibbs Racing	Toyota
60	Ryan Preece	RFK Racing	Ford
71	Michael McDowell	Spire Motorsports	Chevrolet
77	Carson Hocevar	Spire Motorsports	Chevrolet
88	Shane van Gisbergen (R)	Trackhouse Racing	Chevrolet
99	Daniel Suárez	Trackhouse Racing	Chevrolet
Official entry list

== Practice ==
The practice session was canceled due to inclement weather.

== Qualifying ==
Qualifying for the race was cancelled due to inclement weather. Chase Elliott was awarded the pole for the race as a result of NASCAR's pandemic formula with a score of 2.700.

=== Starting lineup ===
Pos	No.	Driver	Team	Manufacturer
1	9	Chase Elliott	Hendrick Motorsports	Chevrolet
2	19	Chase Briscoe	Joe Gibbs Racing	Toyota
3	20	Christopher Bell	Joe Gibbs Racing	Toyota
4	45	Tyler Reddick	23XI Racing	Toyota
5	24	William Byron	Hendrick Motorsports	Chevrolet
6	88	Shane van Gisbergen (R)	Trackhouse Racing	Chevrolet
7	71	Michael McDowell	Spire Motorsports	Chevrolet
8	22	Joey Logano	Team Penske	Ford
9	54	Ty Gibbs	Joe Gibbs Racing	Toyota
10	8	Kyle Busch	Richard Childress Racing	Chevrolet
11	60	Ryan Preece	RFK Racing	Ford
12	17	Chris Buescher	RFK Racing	Ford
13	11	Denny Hamlin	Joe Gibbs Racing	Toyota
14	21	Josh Berry	Wood Brothers Racing	Ford
15	6	Brad Keselowski	RFK Racing	Ford
16	48	Alex Bowman	Hendrick Motorsports	Chevrolet
17	16	A. J. Allmendinger	Kaulig Racing	Chevrolet
18	99	Daniel Suárez	Trackhouse Racing	Chevrolet
19	1	Ross Chastain	Trackhouse Racing	Chevrolet
20	7	Justin Haley	Spire Motorsports	Chevrolet
21	10	Ty Dillon	Kaulig Racing	Chevrolet
22	23	Bubba Wallace	23XI Racing	Toyota
23	3	Austin Dillon	Richard Childress Racing	Chevrolet
24	34	Todd Gilliland	Front Row Motorsports	Ford
25	5	Kyle Larson	Hendrick Motorsports	Chevrolet
26	2	Austin Cindric	Team Penske	Ford
27	43	Erik Jones	Legacy Motor Club	Toyota
28	42	John Hunter Nemechek	Legacy Motor Club	Toyota
29	41	Cole Custer	Haas Factory Team	Ford
30	38	Zane Smith	Front Row Motorsports	Ford
31	12	Ryan Blaney	Team Penske	Ford
32	35	Riley Herbst (R)	23XI Racing	Toyota
33	77	Carson Hocevar	Spire Motorsports	Chevrolet
34	47	Ricky Stenhouse Jr.	Hyak Motorsports	Chevrolet
35	51	Cody Ware	Rick Ware Racing	Ford
36	4	Noah Gragson	Front Row Motorsports	Ford
37	44	J. J. Yeley (i)	NY Racing Team	Chevrolet
Official starting lineup

== Race ==
=== Race results ===
==== Stage Results ====
Stage One Laps: 120

Pos	No	Driver	Team	Manufacturer	Points
1	9	Chase Elliott	Hendrick Motorsports	Chevrolet	10
2	20	Christopher Bell	Joe Gibbs Racing	Toyota	9
3	11	Denny Hamlin	Joe Gibbs Racing	Toyota	8
4	24	William Byron	Hendrick Motorsports	Chevrolet	7
5	48	Alex Bowman	Hendrick Motorsports	Chevrolet	6
6	19	Chase Briscoe	Joe Gibbs Racing	Toyota	5
7	54	Ty Gibbs	Joe Gibbs Racing	Toyota	4
8	8	Kyle Busch	Richard Childress Racing	Chevrolet	3
9	22	Joey Logano	Team Penske	Ford	2
10	5	Kyle Larson	Hendrick Motorsports	Chevrolet	1
Official stage one results

Stage Two Laps: 130

Pos	No	Driver	Team	Manufacturer	Points
1	20	Christopher Bell	Joe Gibbs Racing	Toyota	10
2	48	Alex Bowman	Hendrick Motorsports	Chevrolet	9
3	11	Denny Hamlin	Joe Gibbs Racing	Toyota	8
4	9	Chase Elliott	Hendrick Motorsports	Chevrolet	7
5	5	Kyle Larson	Hendrick Motorsports	Chevrolet	6
6	24	William Byron	Hendrick Motorsports	Chevrolet	5
7	19	Chase Briscoe	Joe Gibbs Racing	Toyota	4
8	54	Ty Gibbs	Joe Gibbs Racing	Toyota	3
9	12	Ryan Blaney	Team Penske	Ford	2
10	23	Bubba Wallace	23XI Racing	Toyota	1
Official stage two results

=== Final Stage Results ===
Stage Three Laps: 150

Pos	Grid	No	Driver	Team	Manufacturer	Laps	Points
1	13	11	Denny Hamlin	Joe Gibbs Racing	Toyota	407	57
2	2	19	Chase Briscoe	Joe Gibbs Racing	Toyota	407	44
3	16	48	Alex Bowman	Hendrick Motorsports	Chevrolet	407	49
4	25	5	Kyle Larson	Hendrick Motorsports	Chevrolet	407	40
5	9	54	Ty Gibbs	Joe Gibbs Racing	Toyota	407	39
6	1	9	Chase Elliott	Hendrick Motorsports	Chevrolet	407	48
7	22	23	Bubba Wallace	23XI Racing	Toyota	407	31
8	31	12	Ryan Blaney	Team Penske	Ford	407	31
9	12	17	Chris Buescher	RFK Racing	Ford	407	28
10	15	6	Brad Keselowski	RFK Racing	Ford	407	27
11	10	8	Kyle Busch	Richard Childress Racing	Chevrolet	407	29
12	4	45	Tyler Reddick	23XI Racing	Toyota	407	25
13	7	71	Michael McDowell	Spire Motorsports	Chevrolet	407	24
14	8	22	Joey Logano	Team Penske	Ford	407	25
15	23	3	Austin Dillon	Richard Childress Racing	Chevrolet	407	22
16	26	2	Austin Cindric	Team Penske	Ford	407	21
17	20	7	Justin Haley	Spire Motorsports	Chevrolet	407	20
18	3	20	Christopher Bell	Joe Gibbs Racing	Chevrolet	407	38
19	11	60	Ryan Preece	RFK Racing	Ford	407	18
20	21	10	Ty Dillon	Kaulig Racing	Chevrolet	407	17
21	28	42	John Hunter Nemechek	Legacy Motor Club	Toyota	406	16
22	30	38	Zane Smith	Front Row Motorsports	Ford	406	15
23	34	47	Ricky Stenhouse Jr.	Hyak Motorsports	Chevrolet	405	14
24	32	35	Riley Herbst (R)	23XI Racing	Toyota	405	13
25	24	34	Todd Gilliland	Front Row Motorsports	Ford	405	12
26	18	99	Daniel Suárez	Trackhouse Racing	Chevrolet	404	11
27	27	43	Erik Jones	Legacy Motor Club	Toyota	404	10
28	14	21	Josh Berry	Wood Brothers Racing	Ford	404	9
29	29	41	Cole Custer	Haas Factory Team	Ford	403	8
30	6	88	Shane van Gisbergen (R)	Trackhouse Racing	Chevrolet	400	7
31	5	24	William Byron	Hendrick Motorsports	Chevrolet	393	18
32	36	4	Noah Gragson	Front Row Motorsports	Ford	393	5
33	19	1	Ross Chastain	Trackhouse Racing	Chevrolet	382	4
34	37	44	J. J. Yeley (i)	NY Racing Team	Chevrolet	369	0
35	33	77	Carson Hocevar	Spire Motorsports	Chevrolet	302	2
36	35	51	Cody Ware	Rick Ware Racing	Ford	231	1
37	17	16	A. J. Allmendinger	Kaulig Racing	Chevrolet	220	1
Official race results

=== Race statistics ===
- Lead changes: 13 among 10 different drivers
- Cautions/Laps: 8 for 50
- Red flags: 1 for 56 minutes and 23 seconds
- Time of race: 3 hours, 40 minutes and 18 seconds
- Average speed: 110.849 miles per hour (178.394 km/h)

== Media ==
=== Television ===
TNT covered the race on the television side. Adam Alexander, Dale Earnhardt Jr. and Steve Letarte called the race from the broadcast booth. Marty Snider, Danielle Trotta, Alan Cavanna and Mamba Smith handled pit road for the television side.

TNT
Booth announcers	Pit reporters
Lap-by-lap: Adam Alexander; Color-commentator: Dale Earnhardt Jr. Color-commentator: Steve Letarte	Marty Snider; Danielle Trotta; Alan Cavanna; Mamba Smith

=== Radio ===
The race was broadcast on radio by the Performance Racing Network and simulcast on Sirius XM NASCAR Radio. Brad Gillie and Mark Garrow called the race from the booth when the field races down the front stretch. Pat Patterson called the race from atop a billboard outside of turn 2 when the field races through turns 1 and 2, and Doug Turnbull called the race from a billboard outside of turn 3 when the field races through turns 3 and 4. On pit road, PRN was manned by Brett McMillan & Heather DeBeaux.

PRN
Booth announcers	Turn announcers	Pit reporters
Lead announcer: Brad Gillie; Announcer: Mark Garrow	Turns 1 & 2: Pat Patterson; Turns 3 & 4: Doug Turnbull	Brett McMillan; Heather DeBeaux

== Standings after the race ==
Drivers' Championship standings

	Pos	Driver	Points
1	1	Chase Elliott	702
1	2	William Byron	686 (–16)
	3	Kyle Larson	664 (–38)
1	4	Denny Hamlin	663 (–39)
1	5	Tyler Reddick	640 (–62)
	6	Christopher Bell	635 (–67)
	7	Ryan Blaney	576 (–126)
	8	Chase Briscoe	570 (–132)
3	9	Alex Bowman	547 (–155)
	10	Chris Buescher	528 (–174)
	11	Joey Logano	524 (–178)
3	12	Ross Chastain	517 (–185)
	13	Bubba Wallace	500 (–202)
	14	Ryan Preece	484 (–218)
	15	Kyle Busch	461 (–241)
1	16	Ty Gibbs	448 (–254)
Official driver's standings

Manufacturers' Championship standings

Pos	Manufacturer	Points
1	Chevrolet	770
2	Toyota	751 (–19)
3	Ford	697 (–73)

- Note: Only the first 16 positions are included for the driver standings.
- . – Driver has clinched a position in the NASCAR Cup Series playoffs.

=== NASCAR In-Season Challenge bracket ===
Atlanta
1	#11 Denny Hamlin	31st
32	#10 Ty Dillon	8th
16	#8 Kyle Busch	21st
17	#6 Brad Keselowski	2nd
8	#48 Alex Bowman	3rd
25	#22 Joey Logano	25th
9	#23 Bubba Wallace	22nd
24	#99 Daniel Suárez	34th
12	#42 John Hunter Nemechek	26th
21	#21 Josh Berry	32nd
5	#9 Chase Elliott	1st
28	#3 Austin Dillon	20th
13	#1 Ross Chastain	33rd
20	#43 Erik Jones	5th
4	#20 Christopher Bell	30th
29	#47 Ricky Stenhouse Jr.	6th
2	#19 Chase Briscoe	35th
31	#4 Noah Gragson	25th
15	#60 Ryan Preece	15th
18	#24 William Byron	37th
7	#12 Ryan Blaney	40th
26	#77 Carson Hocevar	10th
10	#5 Kyle Larson	17th
23	#45 Tyler Reddick	4th
11	#71 Michael McDowell	18th
22	#16 A. J. Allmendinger	12th
6	#54 Ty Gibbs	14th
27	#7 Justin Haley	23rd
14	#38 Zane Smith	7th
19	#2 Austin Cindric	38th
3	#17 Chris Buescher	9th
30	#34 Todd Gilliland	27th

Chicago
32	#10 Ty Dillon	20th
17	#6 Keselowski	37th
8	#48 Bowman	8th
9	#23 Wallace	28th
12	#42 Nemechek	15th
5	#9 Elliott	16th
20	#43 Jones	25th
29	#47 Stenhouse Jr.	31st
31	#4 Gragson	30th
15	#60 Preece	7th
26	#77 Hocevar	35th
23	#45 Reddick	3rd
22	#16 Allmendinger	6th
6	#54 Gibbs	2nd
14	#38 Smith	14th
3	#17 Buescher	18th

Sonoma
32	#10 Ty Dillon	17th
8	#48 Bowman	19th
12	#42 Nemechek	28th
20	#43 Jones	29th
15	#60 Preece	12th
23	#45 Reddick	6th
6	#54 Gibbs	7th
14	#38 Smith	27th

Dover
32	#10 Ty Dillon	20th
12	#42 Nemechek	21st
23	#45 Reddick	12th
6	#54 Gibbs	5th

Indianapolis
32	#10 Ty Dillon	28th
6	#54 Gibbs	21st

Previous race: 2025 Toyota/Save Mart 350	NASCAR Cup Series; 2025 season	Next race: 2025 Brickyard 400
