= 2025 NASCAR In-Season Challenge =

Motorsports tournament

2025 NASCAR In-Season Challenge presented by DraftKings Sportbook
Tournament information
- Date: June 28 – July 27, 2025
- Venue(s): Atlanta Motor Speedway; Chicago Street Course; Sonoma Raceway; Dover Motor Speedway; Indianapolis Motor Speedway
- Teams: 32 (full-time)
- Purse: US$1 Million

Final positions
- Champions: No. 54 Ty Gibbs; Joe Gibbs Racing
- Runner-up: No. 10 Ty Dillon; Kaulig Racing

The 2025 NASCAR In-Season Challenge presented by DraftKings Sportbook was a multi-stage motorsport tournament that was played during the 2025 NASCAR Cup Series season. It was the first edition of the NASCAR In-Season Challenge.

32 full-time drivers in the series participated in the tournament, with races also counting toward the regular season and playoff standings as normal. Following the Cracker Barrel 400 at Nashville Superspeedway, 4 full-time drivers failed to make the challenge: Shane van Gisbergen, Cole Custer, Riley Herbst, and Cody Ware. Following the Brickyard 400 at the Indianapolis Motor Speedway, Ty Gibbs of Joe Gibbs Racing defeated Ty Dillon of Kaulig Racing to win the US$1 million.

== Format ==
The tournament consisted of eight regular season races that would run during June and July. Before the bracket was set, there was a qualifying phase where all eligible drivers compete. The bottom four full-time drivers in the standings after the phase failed to qualify for the bracket. Then, the remaining 32 drivers were seeded into the bracket based on their performance in the three qualifying races. The last five races were conducted in a single elimination bracket, with the first four rounds known as "Challenge Rounds". In each round, the driver in each matchup with the better finish advanced, while the other was eliminated. This process continued until only two drivers remain in the "Champions Round"; the driver with the better finish in that race would become the tournament champion.

== Schedule ==
No	Race name	Track	Location	Date	Time (ET)	TV	Radio	Report
Seeding Races
1	FireKeepers Casino 400	O Michigan International Speedway	Brooklyn, Michigan	June 8	2 PM	Prime Video	MRN	Report
2	Viva México 250	R Autódromo Hermanos Rodríguez	Mexico City, Mexico	June 15	3 PM	Prime Video	MRN	Report
3	The Great American Getaway 400 presented by VISITPA	O Pocono Raceway	Long Pond, Pennsylvania	June 22	2 PM	Prime Video	MRN	Report
Challenge Round 1 (Round of 32)
4	Quaker State 400 available at Walmart	O EchoPark Speedway	Hampton, Georgia	June 28	7 PM	TNT	PRN	Report
Challenge Round 2 (Round of 16)
5	Grant Park 165	S Chicago Street Course	Chicago, Illinois	July 6	2 PM	TNT	MRN	Report
Challenge Round 3 (Quarter-Final)
6	Toyota/Save Mart 350	R Sonoma Raceway	Sonoma, California	July 13	3:30 PM	TNT	PRN	Report
Challenge Round 4 (Semi-Final)
7	Autotrader EchoPark Automotive 400	O Dover Motor Speedway	Dover, Delaware	July 20	2 PM	TNT	PRN	Report
Champions Round (Final)
8	Brickyard 400 presented by PPG	O Indianapolis Motor Speedway	Speedway, Indiana	July 27	2 PM	TNT	IMS/PRN	Report

=== Notes ===
O Oval track
R Road course
S Street course

== Bracket ==
Atlanta
1	#11 Denny Hamlin	31st
32	#10 Ty Dillon	8th
16	#8 Kyle Busch	21st
17	#6 Brad Keselowski	2nd
8	#48 Alex Bowman	3rd
25	#22 Joey Logano	25th
9	#23 Bubba Wallace	22nd
24	#99 Daniel Suárez	34th
12	#42 John Hunter Nemechek	26th
21	#21 Josh Berry	32nd
5	#9 Chase Elliott	1st
28	#3 Austin Dillon	20th
13	#1 Ross Chastain	33rd
20	#43 Erik Jones	5th
4	#20 Christopher Bell	30th
29	#47 Ricky Stenhouse Jr.	6th
2	#19 Chase Briscoe	35th
31	#4 Noah Gragson	25th
15	#60 Ryan Preece	15th
18	#24 William Byron	37th
7	#12 Ryan Blaney	40th
26	#77 Carson Hocevar	10th
10	#5 Kyle Larson	17th
23	#45 Tyler Reddick	4th
11	#71 Michael McDowell	18th
22	#16 A. J. Allmendinger	12th
6	#54 Ty Gibbs	14th
27	#7 Justin Haley	23rd
14	#38 Zane Smith	7th
19	#2 Austin Cindric	38th
3	#17 Chris Buescher	9th
30	#34 Todd Gilliland	27th

Chicago
32	#10 Ty Dillon	20th
17	#6 Keselowski	37th
8	#48 Bowman	8th
9	#23 Wallace	28th
12	#42 Nemechek	15th
5	#9 Elliott	16th
20	#43 Jones	25th
29	#47 Stenhouse Jr.	31st
31	#4 Gragson	30th
15	#60 Preece	7th
26	#77 Hocevar	35th
23	#45 Reddick	3rd
22	#16 Allmendinger	6th
6	#54 Gibbs	2nd
14	#38 Smith	14th
3	#17 Buescher	18th

Sonoma
32	#10 Ty Dillon	17th
8	#48 Bowman	19th
12	#42 Nemechek	28th
20	#43 Jones	29th
15	#60 Preece	12th
23	#45 Reddick	6th
6	#54 Gibbs	7th
14	#38 Smith	27th

Dover
32	#10 Ty Dillon	20th
12	#42 Nemechek	21st
23	#45 Reddick	12th
6	#54 Gibbs	5th

Indianapolis
32	#10 Ty Dillon	28th
6	#54 Gibbs	21st

== Broadcasting ==
The seeding races were streamed on the new package to be shown on Amazon Prime Video. All tournament races were shown on TNT and streamed on HBO Max. TNT's sister channel truTV also aired a weekly Altcast, hosted by Larry McReynolds and Jeff Burton, alongside the main feed.
