= Marty Snider =

American sportscaster (born 1969)

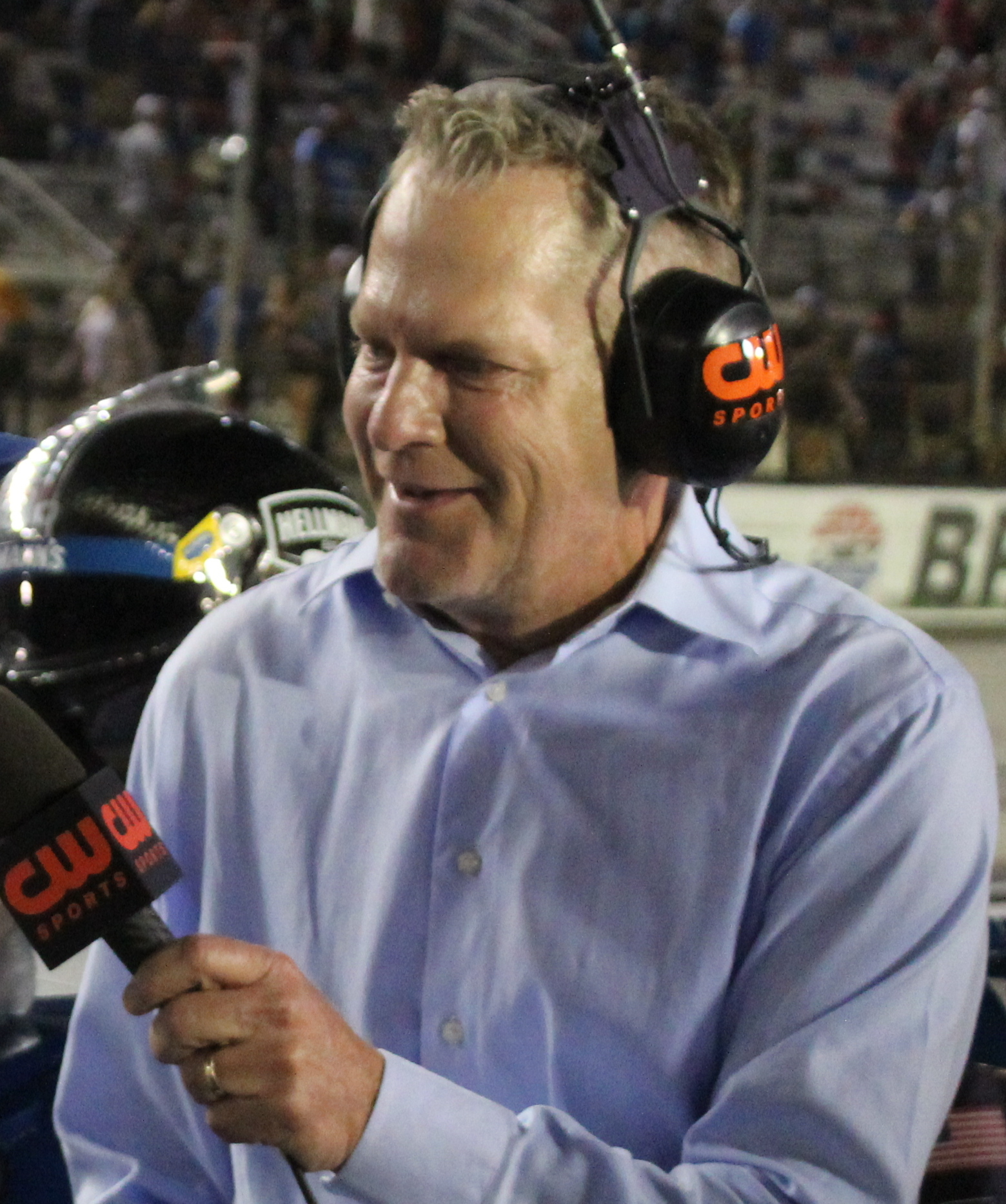
- Snider in 2024
- Born: Marty Snider; July 15, 1969 (age 57); High Point, North Carolina, US
- Sports commentary career
- Genre: Pit reporter
- Sports: NASCAR; IndyCar
- Employer: NBC (2001–present); TNT Sports (2025–present); Prime Video (2025–present)

Marty Snider (born July 15, 1969) is an American sportscaster who currently works as a pit reporter for NASCAR on NBC since 2001, NASCAR on TNT Sports, and NASCAR on Prime Video since 2025. Snider was a pit reporter for NBC Sports for six Indianapolis 500s from 2019 to 2024.

== Career ==
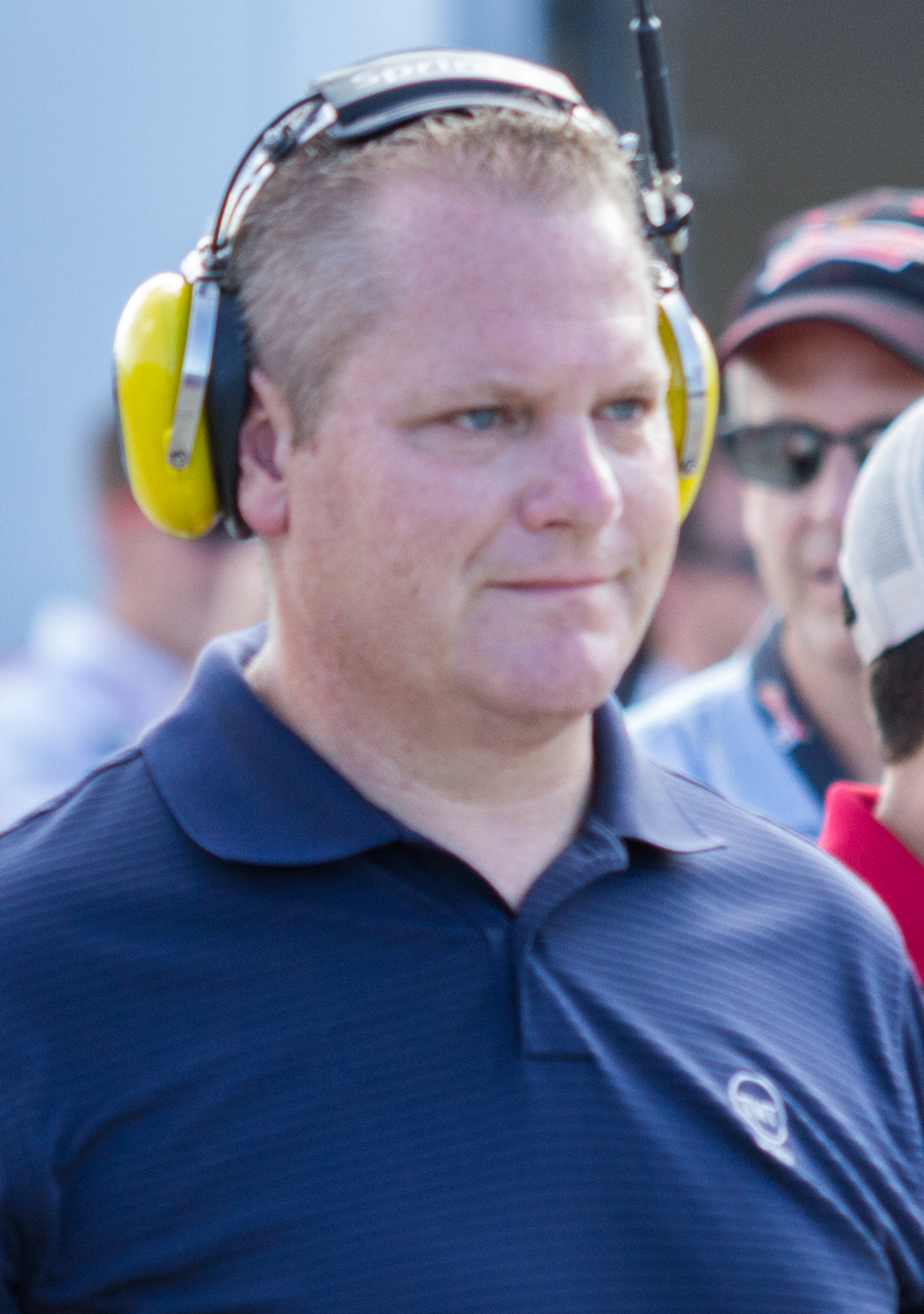
Snider at the 2013 Coke Zero 400.

Snider's career started in 1994 working as a sports reporter for TV station WYFF in Greenville, South Carolina. From 1995 to 2000, Snider was a pit reporter for Motor Racing Network. In 2000, Snider was selected to become a pit reporter for NBC's coverage of the NASCAR Winston Cup Series starting in 2001.

Snider was a courtside reporter at the 2006 NCAA Division I men's basketball tournament for TruTV. In 2013, Snider reported on select games for NBC during the Battle 4 Atlantis tournament.

In 2006, Snider was criticized for making disparaging comments in an interview with Carl Edwards. On Edwards needing a haircut, Steve Byrnes remarked that "another fan wrote in and said we were the whitest men on Earth." Snider then asked Edwards "can you not dance?" NASCAR Vice President Jim Hunter believed Snider used "poor judgement" in the interview while Speed Channel declined to comment.

In 2007, Snider was a pit reporter for NBC Sports' coverage of Championship Off-Road Racing.

Snider worked for NBC's coverage of the 2008 Summer Olympics in Beijing, including reporting for cycling and triathlon.

From 2009 to 2012, Snider worked as a reporter for Professional Bull Riders on CBS Sports Network.

Snider was a pit reporter for IndyCar Series on NBC from 2011 until NBC lost the rights in 2024. Snider reported his first Indianapolis 500 in 2019.

== Personal life ==
Snider grew up in High Point, North Carolina, working summers on cousin Jay Hedgecock's NASCAR Busch Series cars in the early 1980s.

Snider's son Myatt competes in the NASCAR O'Reilly Auto Parts Series. When asked about working a race that Myatt is in, Snider says "I've always told Sam Flood, my boss, that I'm never covering one of his races (...) I don't know...I don't want to."
