= NASCAR on TNT Sports =

Coverage of NASCAR races on TNT Sports

- Also known as: NASCAR on TBS; NASCAR on TNT
- Genre: Auto racing telecasts
- Presented by: See "commentators" section
- Opening theme: "Far from Over" by Frank Stallone (1984–1985); "Thunder Fist" by Edd Kalehoff (1996–2000); "Fuel" by Metallica (2001–2003); "Born to Be Wild" by Hinder (2007–2008); "Highway Star" by Buckcherry (2009); "T.N.T." by AC/DC (2010–2014); Original soundtrack (2025-Present); "Back in the Saddle" by Luke Combs (2026–Present)
- Country of origin: United States
- Original language: English
- No. of seasons: 17 on TBS; 14 on TNT (7 more starting in 2025)

Production
- Camera setup: Multi-camera
- Running time: Countdown to Green: 60 minutes NASCAR on TNT: 3.5–4.5 hours (depending on race length)
- Production companies: World Sports Enterprises (1983-2000); Turner Sports/TNT Sports (2001–2014; 2025–present); NBC Sports (2001–2006); FOX Sports (2007–2014)

Original release
- Network: TBS
- Release: February 27, 1983 – October 8, 2000
- Network: TNT
- Release: July 8, 2001 – July 13, 2014
- Network: TNT, TruTV, HBO Max
- Release: June 28, 2025 – present

NASCAR on TNT Sports is the branding for NASCAR races broadcast on TNT and formerly TBS both by TNT Sports. Initially on TBS from 1983 to 2000, then later moving to TNT to serve as the cable partner for NBC Sports' coverage of NASCAR from 2001 until 2006, TNT later became a NASCAR broadcaster in its own right, covering NASCAR Cup Series events from 2007 until 2014 and again beginning in 2025.

== Coverage history ==
=== 1983–2000 ===
Before the existence of ESPN, live coverage of NASCAR Winston Cup races on television was limited. CBS covered the Daytona 500, the June race at Michigan and the July race at Talladega. ABC usually did the Atlanta race in the spring.

TBS broadcast the Richmond spring race, held the week after Daytona Speedweeks, from 1983 to 1995, as well as the fall races at Rockingham (1985–1987), Atlanta (1983–1985) and Riverside (1982–1987).

For several years in the 1990s, the only Cup Series races aired on TBS were the two races from Charlotte Motor Speedway (Coca-Cola 600 from 1988–2000, UAW-GM Quality 500 from 1989–2000); TBS did not have rights to The Winston, which usually aired on TNN. Also, the channel aired the July race at Pocono Raceway from 1993 to 2000. TBS was also the home of the postseason exhibition races held at Suzuka Circuit and Mobility Resort Motegi in Japan from 1996–1998.

The now defunct Prime Network meanwhile, was the first to televise NASCAR Winston Cup qualifying races on a regular basis. The telecasts were mainly for races that would be televised by TBS.

TBS aired side-by-side coverage during commercials during the 2000 UAW-GM Quality 500 in Charlotte.

=== 2001–2006 ===
NASCAR on TNT original logo (2001–2014)

Races were switched from TBS to TNT in 2001 as part of the then-new NASCAR television deal, although the initial plans were for TBS to carry the races. However, Turner decided that NASCAR would better fit TNT's "We Know Drama" rather than TBS' eventual "Very Funny" slogan.

TNT aired its first NASCAR Winston Cup Series race under the new contract at New Hampshire International Speedway in July 2001. Both networks shared the broadcast team of Allen Bestwick, Benny Parsons, and Wally Dallenbach Jr. in the booth and Bill Weber, Marty Snider, Dave Burns, and Matt Yocum on pit road, as well as both being produced with Turner Sports' graphical look. The only differences were the placement of the network's logo on the graphics package and different colored pit reporter fire suits. Also, Liz Allison, widow of former driver Davey Allison, worked as a reporter exclusively for TNT during the 2001 season.

TNT was treated as the secondary broadcaster, as far as broadcast rights are concerned, during its relationship with NBC because it is a cable rather than broadcast network (Turner produced all of NBC's telecasts as well). NBC's portion of broadcast included almost all of the prestigious races during their half of the year (with the exception of the Southern 500 at Darlington, the fourth leg of NASCAR's Grand Slam, in 2001 and 2002, and the Chevy Rock & Roll 400 at Richmond from 2004 to 2006, when the race was the last race of the regular season under the season format). The idea was that ratings would most certainly be higher for NBC's coverage of a given race next to TNT's due to a broadcaster's penetration. TNT was given most of the Busch Series schedule except for major races, then covered by NBC. Night races were almost always covered by TNT except for the Pepsi 400 at Daytona, which aired on NBC in years that they had the rights to it, and (later) the UAW-GM Quality 500 at Charlotte when that race was moved from Sunday afternoons to Saturday nights. Otherwise, following the fall Richmond race, TNT's Cup Series coverage was limited to one, two or three races (including the Pop Secret Microwave Popcorn 400 at Rockingham, which they covered from 2001 to 2003).

It was generally understood that anytime a major news story needed to be covered by NBC its NASCAR coverage would be switched over to TNT. This occurred only once: the 2001 UAW-GM Quality 500 at Lowe's Motor Speedway was interrupted during the prerace show when President George W. Bush announced the beginning of Operation Enduring Freedom in response to the September 11 attacks. NBC covered the news until 25 laps to go (simulcast with TNT), and the entire race was shown on TNT.

TNT also would broadcast any NBC-scheduled races that were postponed by rain until the following day, much like FX would do for Fox during this contract (this is no longer applicable as Fox airs rain-delayed races the following day, since Fox has no daytime programming, unlike ABC, CBS and NBC).

The TNT–NBC partnership broke off when NBC chose not to bid for the NASCAR contract when it expired in 2006.

=== 2007–2014 ===
TNT, however, elected to make a bid for rights in the new television contract and was successful in retaining its coverage, joining Fox and the ESPN family of networks in a contract that ran until 2014. Under the terms of said contract TNT gained broadcast rights to six June and July races, which it calls the NASCAR on TNT Summer Series. TNT's six races in 2014 were the Pocono 400 at Pocono Raceway, the Quicken Loans 400 at Michigan International Speedway, the Toyota/Save Mart 350 at Sonoma Raceway, the Quaker State 400 at Kentucky Speedway, the annual July 4 weekend Coke Zero 400 at Daytona International Speedway, and the Camping World RV Sales 301 at New Hampshire Motor Speedway.

Unlike in the previous contract TNT was not able to procure rights to any Nationwide Series races, as ESPN successfully bid to be the exclusive carrier of the series. However, TNT became the exclusive home for the Coke Zero 400, much like Fox had become exclusive home for the Daytona 500 — in the previous contract, Fox and NBC alternated coverage of the two races at Daytona, with Fox airing the Daytona 500 and NBC the Pepsi 400 in odd-numbered years, and vice versa in even-numbered years.

Bill Weber stayed on as TNT's NASCAR voice and Wally Dallenbach Jr. was retained to be his color commentator. Benny Parsons was to join the two in the booth and had a contract for 2007, but he died from lung cancer in January after he missed four races in 2006 for treatment on his lung cancer. Kyle Petty elected to take time off from his driving duties to take the position in the broadcast booth. Marty Snider and Matt Yocum returned as pit reporters. To replace Allen Bestwick and Dave Burns, both of whom went to ESPN following the 2006 season, TNT promoted Ralph Sheheen and Lindsay Czarniak to full-time pit reporter positions; previously both of them served as substitutes or for stand-alone Busch Series races that conflicted with the Cup Series schedule. To round out the coverage, Larry McReynolds was loaned by Fox to provide analysis and explanations.

==== 2007–2009 ====
From 2007 to 2009, TNT's pre-race coverage began with a one-hour show called NASCAR on TNT Live! This was followed by a 30-minute version of Countdown to Green, followed by the race itself. The pre-race coverage was changed in 2010 to a simple one-hour version of Countdown to Green due to NASCAR's new policy of earlier start times. Since 2007, each pre-race broadcast (whether it be on NASCAR on TNT Live! or Countdown to Green) featured "The Pride of NASCAR" segment which featured an interview with a historical NASCAR figure. Some examples include Richard Petty (interviewed by his son Kyle), A. J. Foyt, and Mario Andretti.

One of the most popular features of TNT's coverage is RaceBuddy, a free online application on NASCAR.com that allows fans to watch the race through their choice of several camera angles. In 2009, Jim Noble was added as the RaceBuddy-only pit reporter.

On July 7, 2007, during the Pepsi 400, TNT used for the first time a new broadcast format called "Wide-Open Coverage". The race broadcast was moved to the top of the screen, with all scoring graphics placed in the bottom of the screen.The race was also broadcast with limited commercial interruption; only three green flag laps took place during commercials during the entire broadcast, because of cable and satellite television providers having several minutes every hour to air local ads, bypassing TNT entirely. All other commercials were aired in the lower third of the screen, similar to what is used by the IndyCar Series but with a significantly larger window for the race coverage. Most of these commercials featured a special ad for that race, followed by their traditional ad. For each Daytona race through 2012, TNT featured the Wide-Open Coverage format. In 2009 and 2010, no green flag laps were missed. In 2013, the format was only used for the last 30 laps, as they were only able to get two sponsors for the format, and in 2014, was dropped entirely due to the race being delayed to Sunday by rain.

During the broadcast of the 2008 LifeLock.com 400, Larry McReynolds performed a magic trick, "cutting" Marc Fein in half while green flag racing was taking place on the racetrack. This came at the dismay and outrage of many fans and viewers.

TNT also missed the winning pass of the 2008 Coke Zero 400 when a last lap crash involving Michael Waltrip took out several cars. When it was all said and done, TNT panned over to Carl Edwards, who prematurely celebrated his victory, thinking he had the lead when the caution came out. Because the crash occurred on the last lap, the field is frozen at the moment the caution came out and NASCAR reviews the finishing order by using video replays and scoring loop data. Those replays all showed Kyle Busch as the leader when the caution came out; Busch was declared the winner of the Coke Zero 400.

==== 2010–2014 ====
The 2010 race also featured a 3-D broadcast on some cable/satellite providers and on NASCAR.com.

There were some technical issues with TNT's final Sprint Cup race of the season at Chicagoland when the picture and sound went out during the prerace show, causing the invocation and the national anthem to not be televised.

Beginning with the Party at the Poconos 400 race on June 9, 2013, TNT's NASCAR coverage switched to a 16:9 aspect ratio letterbox format, though it did retain its on-air graphics package that has been in use since 2007. The ticker across the top of the screen also changed, with the lap counter and TNT network logo both being moved to the upper right-hand corner of the screen. The screen on TNT's standard-definition 4:3 feed now airs a letterboxed version of the native HD feed to match that of Fox's and ESPN's respective default widescreen SD presentations. NASCAR on TNT was the last of the 3 broadcast partners to switch to a widescreen presentation. NBC became the 4th to switch to letterbox format on SD feeds in 2015.

=== The end of the original run of NASCAR on TNT ===
The 2014 Camping World RV Sales 301, on July 13, at New Hampshire Motor Speedway, was the final NASCAR race televised on TNT (until 2025) in its fourteen years with TNT and marked the end of NASCAR's total 32-year run on Turner Sports, dating back to 1983; in the wake of former co-partner NBC signing a new agreement to televise races from the major NASCAR series (mainly Cup Series and Xfinity Series as well as Mexico Series races on its Spanish-language networks). Thus, TNT decided to devote a large segment of the pre-race show to showing clips of signature NASCAR moments to air on both it and TBS; and also welcomed NASCAR president Mike Helton to the TNT booth to talk about the relationship of NASCAR with Turner Sports, as Helton had been president of the Atlanta Motor Speedway when Turner Sports showed its first race at AMS, which had aired on TBS in 1983, 32 years prior. Finally, the conclusive pre-race broadcast in fourteen years of NASCAR on TNT was closed out by former TBS lead announcer and New England native Ken Squier.

Hello everyone, I'm Ken Squier. And as the engines have fired at New Hampshire, I remind you that this is the final NASCAR broadcast for Turner Sports. I was the play-by-play announcer for TBS for 18 years beginning in the very first year of NASCAR coverage, 1983. It's been a real honor to be a part of today's broadcast and I wish my colleagues the very best today on TNT, as this amazing 32-year run comes to a close. I hope you enjoy today's race.

During NASCAR's 32-year run on Turner Sports, the races aired on TBS (1983–2000) and TNT (2001–2014).

=== 2025 return ===
On November 29, 2023, TNT Sports announced that it had acquired the rights to five yearly summer NASCAR Cup Series races starting in 2025. TruTV will also hold the rights to practice and qualifying for 19 Cup Series races per season. All races, as well as practice and qualifying, will stream on HBO Max. NASCAR announced that they would hold a mid-season bracket challenge for Cup Series teams that would take place during TNT's five races. The top 32 drivers from the three previous races who would be seeded in the bracket for the start of the tournament based on their finishes in those races. The driver who wins the bracket challenge will win $1 million. Max will also exclusively have the rights to air a driver cam for every driver in all Cup Series races. The cam will include scanner audio.

On September 5, 2024, as a prelude to the package, NASCAR Productions began producing a weekly studio show for TruTV known as NASCAR Inside the Playoffs, featuring Shannon Spake, Steve Letarte, Mamba Smith and Jordan Bianchi.

TNT officially announced its broadcast team on November 18, 2024. Adam Alexander returns as the lead lap-by-lap commentator, with analysts Steve Letarte and Dale Earnhardt Jr. The team will also be shared with NASCAR on Prime Video.

== Commentators ==
1983–2000

Booth announcers/analysts included Ken Squier, Buddy Baker, and Dick Berggren. After TBS made a host/booth switch, Allen Bestwick became the lap-by-lap announcer with Baker and Berggren in the booth for TBS' 2000 coverage at Charlotte and Pocono.

=== Lap-by-lap ===
- Allen Bestwick
- Ken Squier

=== Color commentary ===
- Buddy Baker
- Dick Berggren
- Geoff Bodine
- Neil Bonnett
- Chuck Bown
- Dick Brooks
- Barry Dodson
- Chris Economaki
- Johnny Hayes
- Ernie Irvan
- Glenn Jarrett
- Dave Marcis
- Chad Little
- Benny Parsons
- Phil Parsons
- Richard Petty
- Greg Sacks
- Lyn St. James
- Ken Stabler
- Kenny Wallace
- Cale Yarborough

=== Pit road reporters ===
- Jack Arute
- Dick Berggren
- Steve Byrnes
- Alice Cook
- Dave Despain
- Chris Economaki
- Jerry Garrett
- Charlie Harville
- Glenn Jarrett
- Mike Massaro
- Benny Parsons
- Phil Parsons
- Pat Patterson
- Randy Pemberton
- Mark Pfister
- Bob Varsha
- Mike Hogewood
- Jerry Punch
- Mike Wallace
- Joe Whitlock
- Matt Yocum
- Marty Snider

=== Studio hosts ===
Late 1980s broadcasts were known for an infield broadcasting "host" set called "STP Race Central."

- Rick Benjamin
- Allen Bestwick
- Dave Despain
- Mike Joy
- Ken Squier

2001–2014

- Adam Alexander
- Wally Dallenbach Jr.
- Kyle Petty (now with NASCAR Productions)
- Ralph Sheheen (now with Speedsport)
- Matt Yocum (now with NBC Sports)
- Marty Snider
- Chris Neville
- Larry McReynolds
- Bill Weber (died in 2024)
- Marc Fein
- Allen Bestwick
- Benny Parsons (died in 2007)
- Phil Parsons (now with Fox ARCA)
- Lindsay Czarniak (now with Fox NFL)

2025–2031

- Adam Alexander
- Dale Earnhardt Jr.
- Steve Letarte
- Marty Snider (pit reporter)
- Danielle Trotta (pit reporter)
- Shannon Spake (pit reporter and studio host in 2025)
- Mamba Smith (pit reporter)
- Marty Smith (pre–and post–race)
- Jamie McMurray (pre-and post-race)
- Jeff Burton (studio analyst)
- Jimmie Johnson (studio analyst)
- Parker Kligerman (studio analyst) (2025 only)
- Alan Cavanna (pit reporter) (2025 only)

=== Broadcast team history ===
TNT and NBC shared the broadcast team of Allen Bestwick on lap-by-lap and Benny Parsons and Wally Dallenbach Jr. on color commentary. Dave Burns, Matt Yocum, Marty Snider, and Bill Weber were the pit reporters, with Weber hosting the Countdown to Green pre-race show.

When TNT would broadcast Busch Series races that conflicted with the Cup races, other pit reporters, such as Glenn Jarrett, Mark Garrow, Ralph Sheheen, and Lindsay Czarniak would join the coverage.

In 2004, Weber became the lap-by-lap announcer for two races as Bestwick recovered from a leg injury he suffered while playing hockey.

==== 2005–2006 ====
In 2005, Bestwick and Weber traded positions. However, Bestwick would occasionally do lap-by-lap for Busch races that conflicted with the schedule for the primary series. Bestwick also filled in for lap-by-lap commentary at the Fall Phoenix Busch race when Weber became ill with laryngitis.

==== 2007–2009 ====
For 2007, TNT went solo, covering six races that started with the Pocono 500 on June 10. Weber and Dallenbach returned to the broadcast booth. After Parsons' death from cancer, he was replaced by Kyle Petty, who took time off from his driving duties at Petty Enterprises to do so. Weber also continued to host the pre-race shows, NASCAR on TNT Live and Allstate Countdown to Green, joined by Marc Fein and Fox Sports' Larry McReynolds (producer Barry Landis also came over from Fox for these six races). Like the other networks, TNT has adopted a "cut-away" car (provided by Ford) that McReynolds uses occasionally on the telecasts. Also during the race, Fein and McReynolds contribute to the coverage from a large infield studio that revolves from a point several feet above ground level.

Marty Snider and Matt Yocum returned as pit reporters. Ralph Sheheen and Lindsay Czarniak joined the team full-time for 2007, replacing Dave Burns and Allen Bestwick, who had jumped to ESPN.

On June 24, Petty contributed to the broadcast from inside the race car at Sonoma Raceway during the Toyota/Save Mart 350. During the race, he uttered an obscenity that was picked up by the network's microphones after he was involved in a crash on lap 1 with Matt Kenseth and Marc Goossens. Weber apologized to viewers, and Petty's status at TNT appeared to be secure despite the incident. No fines were issued by the Federal Communications Commission (FCC) for the incident as cable television is not subjected to the FCC's indecency policies.

The broadcast remained the same in the 2008 and 2009 seasons. However, halfway through TNT's 2009 race coverage, Weber was suspended by TNT for an incident at a hotel and was replaced in the broadcast booth by Sheheen. TNT later announced that Weber would not return for the Daytona or Chicagoland races, leading many to believe that he was fired by the network, and named Sheheen as his replacement. To take Sheheen's place on pit road TNT turned to SPEED's NASCAR Craftsman Truck Series pit reporter Adam Alexander.

==== 2010–2014 ====
On February 25, 2010, USA Today and Jayski's Silly Season Site confirmed that Weber's TNT contract was not renewed, but that he was still under a general motorsports contract with NBC (which reportedly may also include NASCAR Whelen Modified Tour coverage on Versus, whose parent Comcast was buying NBC Universal). NASCAR.com reported on March 3, 2010, that Weber would be replaced by Adam Alexander and Sheheen would return to pit reporting. To replace Weber as pre-race show host, Lindsay Czarniak was moved from the pits to take his place. TNT hired SPEED's Phil Parsons to take Czarniak's place. Parsons didn't return for 2011. Kyle Petty joined Czarniak and Larry McReynolds for the pre-race programs for the 2010 season, as Marc Fein was moved to TBS' Sunday major league baseball broadcasts. Fein left Turner Sports altogether in 2012 (he joined Dallas NBC affiliate KXAS-TV as an anchor that year). Czarniak did not return for the 2012 season (she joined ESPN as an anchor for SportsCenter in 2011). In 2012, lap-by-lap race announcer Adam Alexander added pre-race show host to his responsibilities.

==== 2025–2031 ====
On May 6, 2025, TNT Sports officially announced its new NASCAR commentary team. Adam Alexander returns as the lead lap-by-lap commentator, alongside color commentators Dale Earnhardt Jr. and Steve Letarte. Marty Snider, Danielle Trotta and Alan Cavanna will serve as pit reporters. Shannon Spake will host studio programming, branded as NASCAR Nation, alongside Jamie McMurray and Parker Kligerman. On TruTV, TNT Sports will air a NASCAR altcast with Larry McReynolds and Jeff Burton. Additionally, Mamba Smith will also contribute to TNT Sports' coverage.

In 2026, Marty Smith joined TNT coverage to host the in-studio show segment. Jimmie Johnson will join TNT Sports as a studio analyst for 3 races and Shannon Spake will move from host to pit road

== Wide Open coverage ==
The Coke Zero 400 was broadcast in TNT's Wide Open Coverage format. The format was similar to the Side-by-Side format used in IndyCar broadcasts, limiting commercial breaks to only those required by their cable and satellite partners, mostly during yellow and red flag portions. The result meant almost no green flag racing was missed. A 3-D telecast was available in the United States on Comcast, Bright House Networks and Time Warner cable systems as well as NASCAR.com and DirecTV, marking a historic first in NASCAR racing.

== See also ==
- NASCAR on NBC
- NASCAR on ESPN
- NASCAR on Fox
- NASCAR on Prime Video
- NASCAR on The CW
- NASCAR on USA Sports

Preceded by None	NASCAR pay television carrier in the United States; 1983–2000	Succeeded by TNT
Preceded by TBS/TNN/ESPN	NASCAR pay television carrier in the United States; 2001–2014	Succeeded by FS1/NBCSN/USA
Preceded by None	NASCAR pay television carrier in the United States; 2025–present (shared with FS1, USA/Peacock and Prime Video)	Succeeded by None
