= 2025 NASCAR Cup Series =

American motorsport season

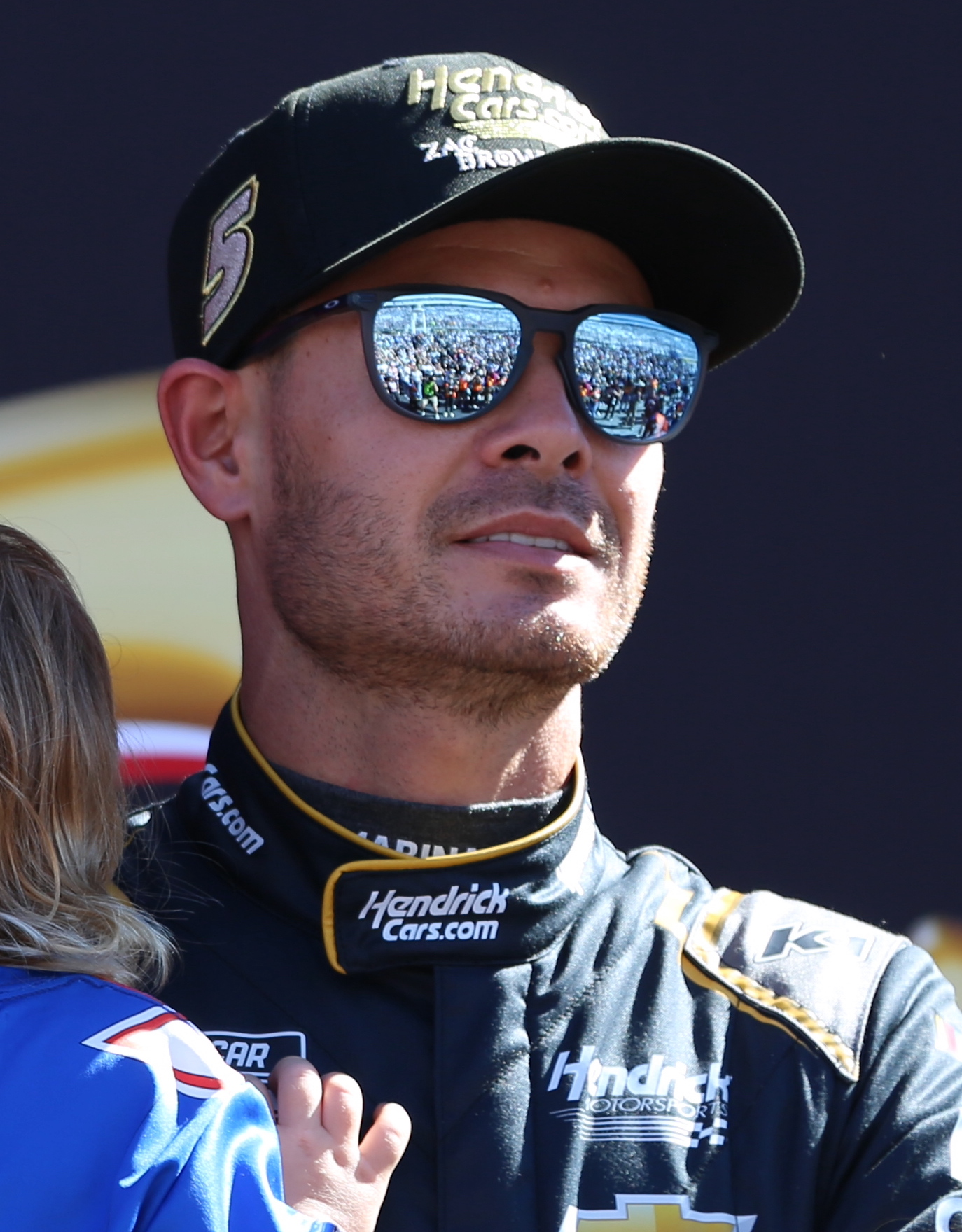
Kyle Larson won his second Cup Series championship.

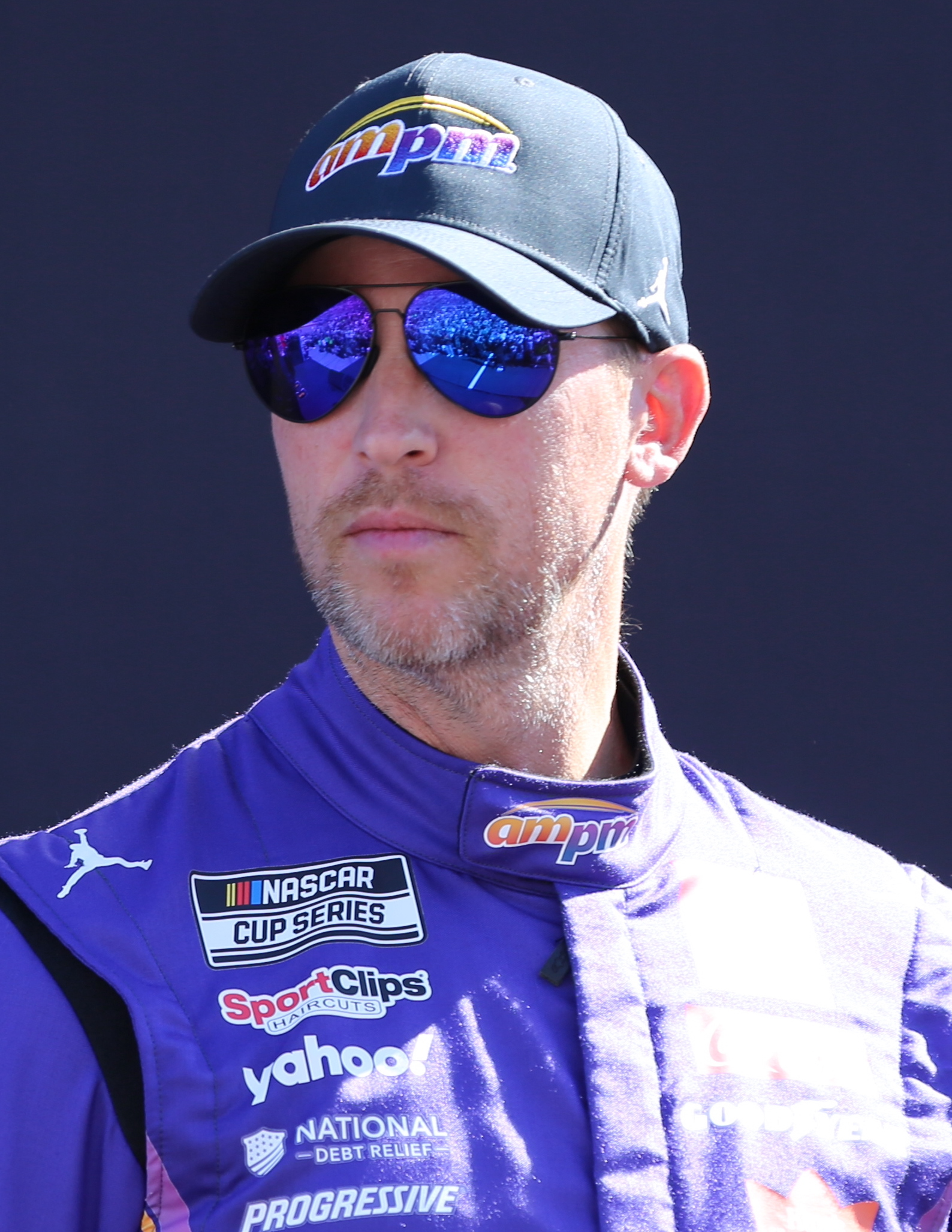
Denny Hamlin finished second in the standings.

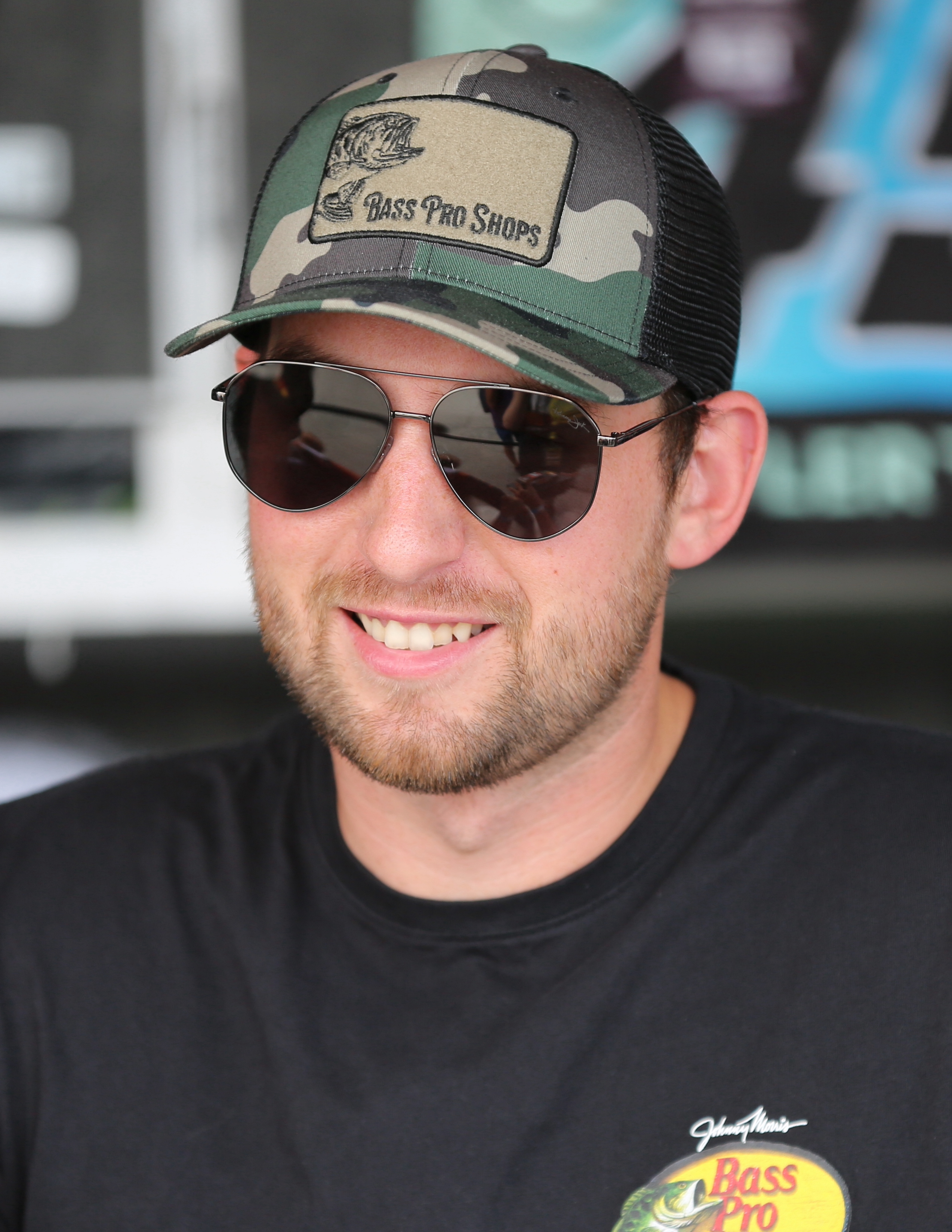
Chase Briscoe finished third in the standings.

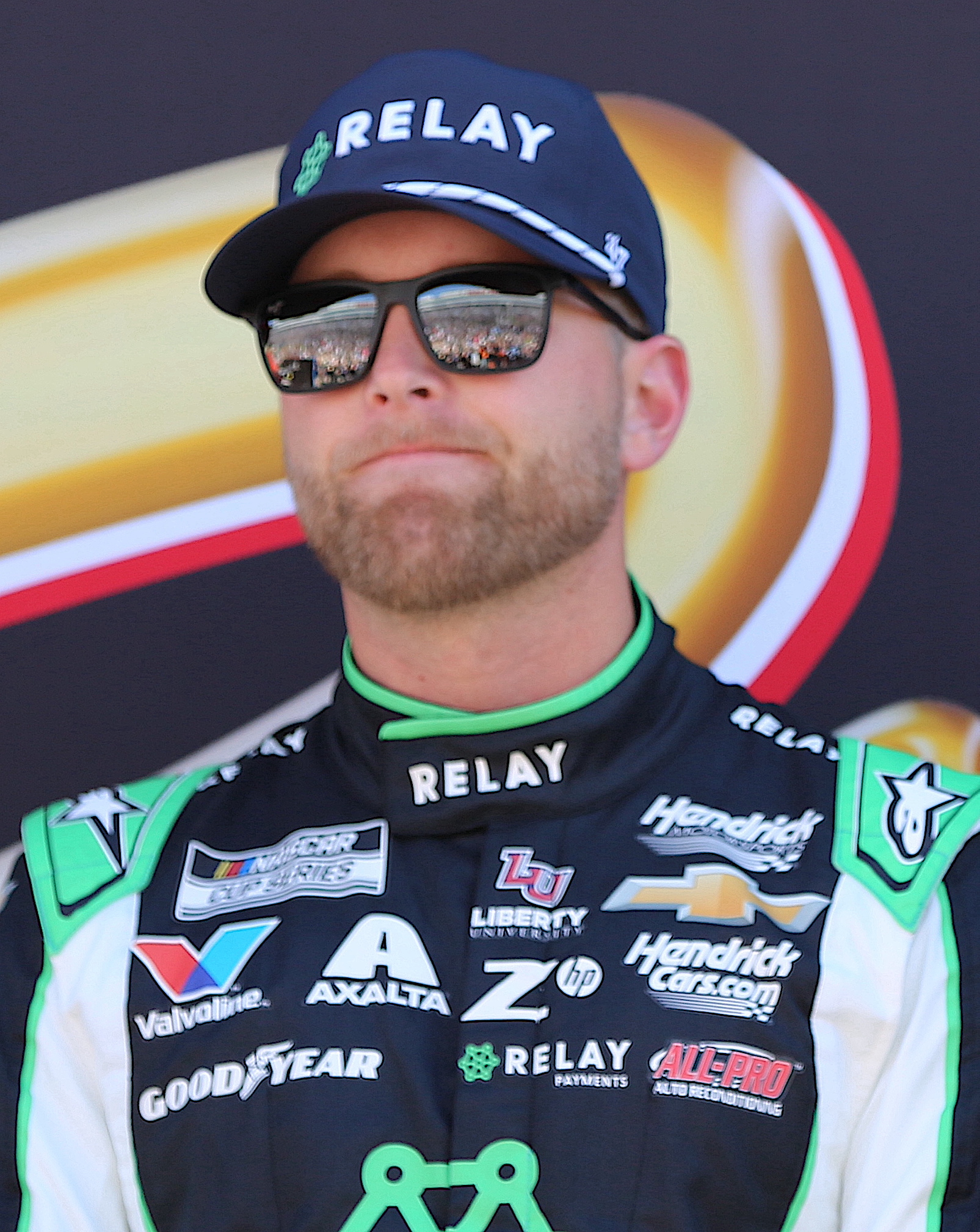
William Byron, the Regular Season Champion, finished fourth in the standings.

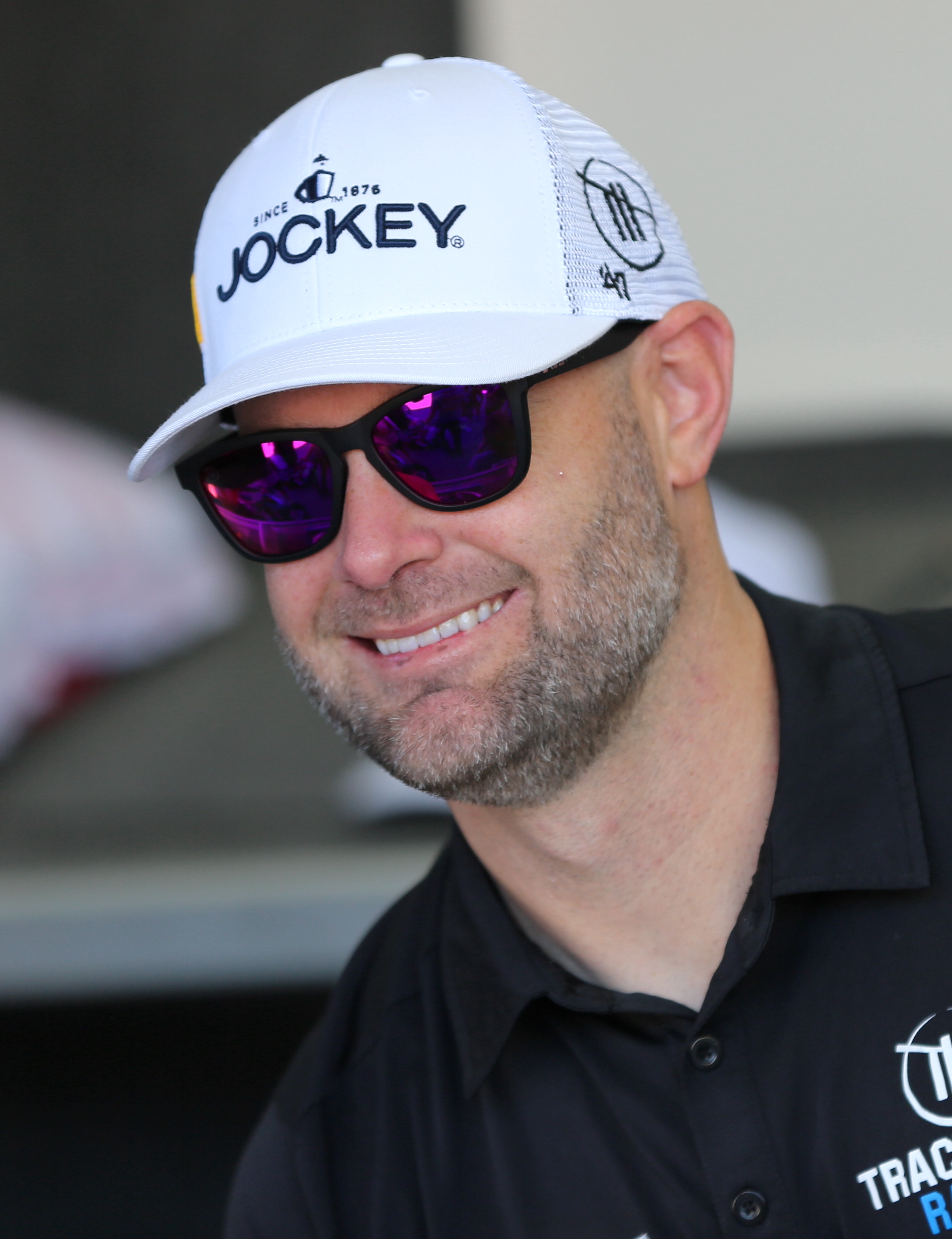
Shane van Gisbergen, the 2025 NASCAR Rookie of the Year.

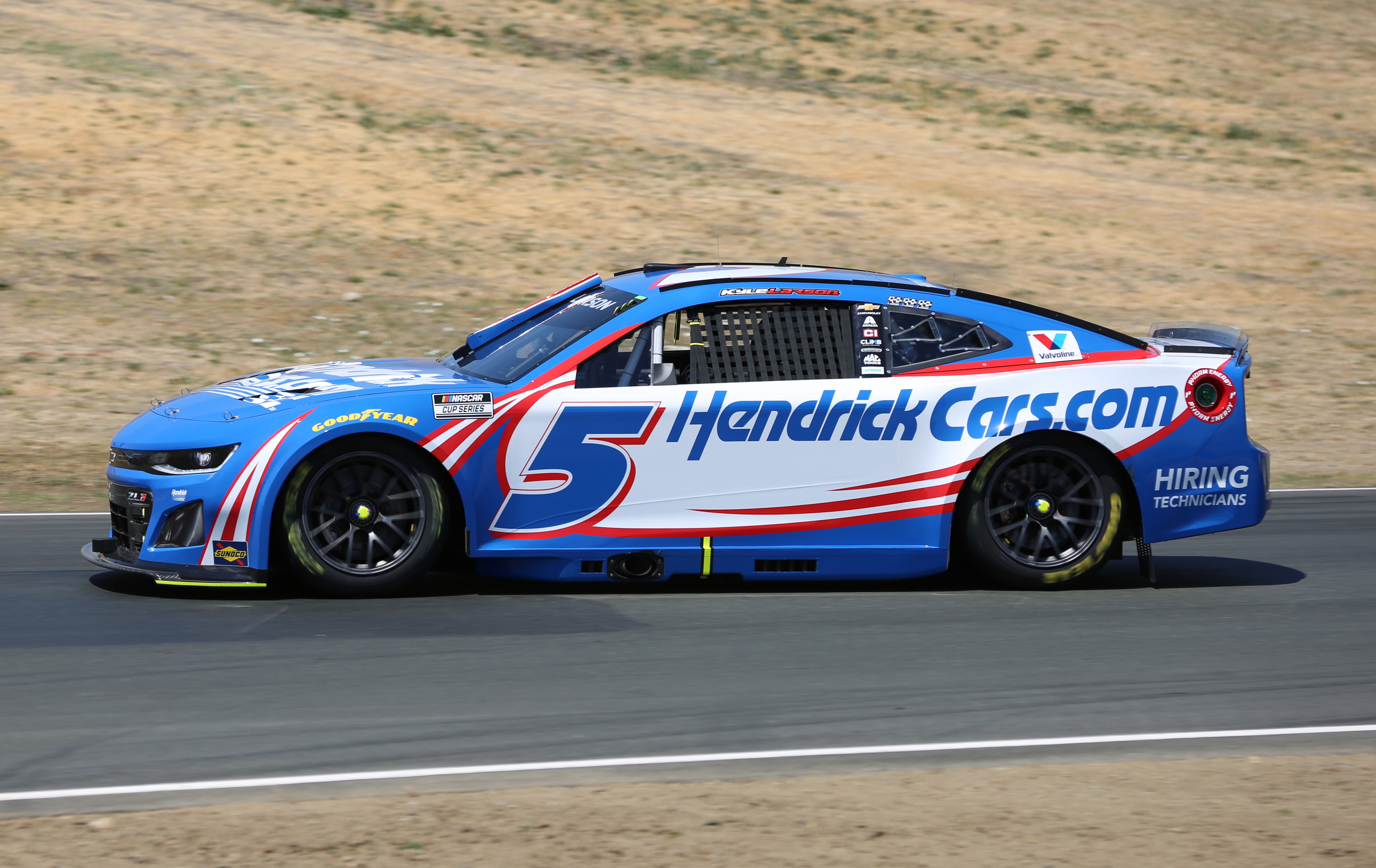
Chevrolet won the manufacturers' championship.

The 2025 NASCAR Cup Series was the 77th season of NASCAR professional stock car racing in the United States and the 54th season of the modern-era Cup Series. Joey Logano of Team Penske entered the season as the defending 2024 NASCAR Cup Series champion. The season started with the Cook Out Clash on February 2, and concluded at Phoenix Raceway on November 2, where Kyle Larson won the championship after finishing third at the NASCAR Cup Series Championship Race.

The 2025 season was the first year under NASCAR's new TV deal that will last until 2031. This was also the first year since 2008 that Stewart–Haas Racing (now Haas Factory Team) did not have the ownership of Tony Stewart. Katherine Legge made her Cup Series debut as well, being the first woman since Danica Patrick in 2018 to make a Cup Series start. NASCAR held its first race outside the United States in 67 years with the 2025 Viva México 250.

It was the last season to utilize the elimination-style NASCAR playoffs, having served as the Cup Series' championship format since 2014. This would also unexpectedly be the final full-time season for two-time champion Kyle Busch, as he would die from sepsis caused by pneumonia on May 21, 2026.

== Teams and drivers ==
=== New charter agreement ===
The 2025 season is the first under the new charter agreement, which limits teams to a maximum of three charters. Hendrick Motorsports and Joe Gibbs Racing, which have four charters each, are grandfathered in the new agreement.

=== Chartered teams ===
| Manufacturer | Team | No. | Driver | Crew chief | References |
|---|---|---|---|---|---|
| Chevrolet | Hendrick Motorsports | 5 | Kyle Larson | Cliff Daniels | |
| Chevrolet | Hendrick Motorsports | 9 | Chase Elliott | Alan Gustafson | |
| Chevrolet | Hendrick Motorsports | 24 | William Byron | Rudy Fugle 35; Brandon McSwain 1 | |
| Chevrolet | Hendrick Motorsports | 48 | Alex Bowman | Blake Harris | |
| Chevrolet | Hyak Motorsports | 47 | Ricky Stenhouse Jr. | Mike Kelley | |
| Chevrolet | Kaulig Racing | 10 | Ty Dillon | Andrew Dickeson | |
| Chevrolet | Kaulig Racing | 16 | A. J. Allmendinger | Trent Owens | |
| Chevrolet | Richard Childress Racing | 3 | Austin Dillon | Richard Boswell | |
| Chevrolet | Richard Childress Racing | 8 | Kyle Busch | Randall Burnett 31; Andy Street 5 | |
| Chevrolet | Spire Motorsports | 7 | Justin Haley | Rodney Childers 9 Ryan Sparks 27 | |
| Chevrolet | Spire Motorsports | 71 | Michael McDowell | Travis Peterson 35; Matt McCall 1 | |
| Chevrolet | Spire Motorsports | 77 | Carson Hocevar | Luke Lambert | |
| Chevrolet | Trackhouse Racing | 1 | Ross Chastain | Phil Surgen | |
| Chevrolet | Trackhouse Racing | 88 | Shane van Gisbergen (R) | Stephen Doran 35; Chais Eliason 1 | |
| Chevrolet | Trackhouse Racing | 99 | Daniel Suárez | Matt Swiderski | |
| Ford | Haas Factory Team | 41 | Cole Custer | Aaron Kramer | |
| Ford | RFK Racing | 6 | Brad Keselowski | Jeremy Bullins | |
| Ford | RFK Racing | 17 | Chris Buescher | Scott Graves 35; Doug Randolph 1 | |
| Ford | RFK Racing | 60 | Ryan Preece | Derrick Finley | |
| Ford | Rick Ware Racing | 51 | Cody Ware | Tommy Baldwin Jr. 1 Billy Plourde 35 | |
| Ford | Team Penske | 2 | Austin Cindric | Brian Wilson | |
| Ford | Team Penske | 12 | Ryan Blaney | Jonathan Hassler | |
| Ford | Team Penske | 22 | Joey Logano | Paul Wolfe | |
| Ford | Wood Brothers Racing | 21 | Josh Berry | Miles Stanley | |
| Toyota | Joe Gibbs Racing | 11 | Denny Hamlin 35 | Chris Gayle | |
| Toyota | Joe Gibbs Racing | 11 | Ryan Truex 1 | Chris Gayle | |
| Toyota | Joe Gibbs Racing | 19 | Chase Briscoe | James Small | |
| Toyota | Joe Gibbs Racing | 20 | Christopher Bell | Adam Stevens | |
| Toyota | Joe Gibbs Racing | 54 | Ty Gibbs | Tyler Allen | |
| Toyota | Legacy Motor Club | 42 | John Hunter Nemechek | Travis Mack | |
| Toyota | Legacy Motor Club | 43 | Erik Jones | Ben Beshore | |

=== Non-chartered teams ===
==== Full schedule ====
| Manufacturer | Team | No. | Driver | Crew chief | References |
|---|---|---|---|---|---|
| Ford | Front Row Motorsports | 4 | Noah Gragson | Drew Blickensderfer | |
| Ford | Front Row Motorsports | 34 | Todd Gilliland | Kevyn Rebolledo 1 Chris Lawson 35 | |
| Ford | Front Row Motorsports | 38 | Zane Smith | Ryan Bergenty | |
| Toyota | 23XI Racing | 23 | Bubba Wallace | Charles Denike | |
| Toyota | 23XI Racing | 35 | Riley Herbst (R) | Davin Restivo | |
| Toyota | 23XI Racing | 45 | Tyler Reddick | Billy Scott | |

==== Limited schedule ====
| Manufacturer | Team | No. | Driver | Crew chief | Races | References |
|---|---|---|---|---|---|---|
| Chevrolet | Beard Motorsports | 62 | Anthony Alfredo | Darren Shaw | 3 | |
| Chevrolet | Beard Motorsports | 62 | Jesse Love | Darren Shaw | 2 | |
| Chevrolet | JR Motorsports | 40 | Justin Allgaier | Greg Ives | 1 | |
| Chevrolet | Kaulig Racing | 13 | Will Brown | Mike Cook | 1 | |
| Chevrolet | Live Fast Motorsports | 78 | B. J. McLeod | David Ingram | 6 | |
| Chevrolet | Live Fast Motorsports | 78 | Katherine Legge | David Ingram | 7 | |
| Chevrolet | NY Racing Team | 44 | J. J. Yeley | Jay Guy | 11 | |
| Chevrolet | NY Racing Team | 44 | Derek Kraus | Jay Guy | 2 | |
| Chevrolet | NY Racing Team | 44 | Brennan Poole | Jay Guy | 1 | |
| Chevrolet | NY Racing Team | 44 | Joey Gase | Jay Guy | 1 | |
| Chevrolet | Richard Childress Racing | 33 | Austin Hill | Andy Street | 5 | |
| Chevrolet | Richard Childress Racing | 33 | Jesse Love | Andy Street | 3 | |
| Chevrolet | Team AmeriVet | 50 | Burt Myers | Tony Eury Jr. | 1 | |
| Chevrolet | Trackhouse Racing | 87 | Connor Zilisch (Note: At Watkins Glen (race #24), Zilisch practiced and qualified the No. 87. However, due to his injury sustained the previous day, Trackhouse announced that they would withdraw the No. 87 from the race.) | Darian Grubb | 4 | |
| Chevrolet | Trackhouse Racing | 91 | Hélio Castroneves | Darian Grubb | 1 | |
| Ford | Garage 66 | 66 | Chandler Smith | Carl Long | 1 | |
| Ford | Garage 66 | 66 | Casey Mears | Carl Long | 5 | |
| Ford | Garage 66 | 66 | Josh Bilicki | Carl Long | 6 | |
| Ford | Garage 66 | 66 | Chad Finchum | Carl Long | 3 | |
| Ford | Garage 66 | 66 | David Starr | Carl Long | 1 | |
| Ford | Garage 66 | 66 | Joey Gase | Carl Long | 1 | |
| Ford | Garage 66 | 66 | Timmy Hill | Carl Long | 1 | |
| Ford | Rick Ware Racing | 01 | Corey LaJoie | Jerry Kelley | 4 | |
| Toyota | 23XI Racing | 67 | Corey Heim | Bootie Barker | 5 | |
| Toyota | Legacy Motor Club | 84 | Jimmie Johnson | Chad Johnston | 2 | |
| Toyota | Tricon Garage | 56 | Martin Truex Jr. | Cole Pearn | 1 | |

=== Team changes ===
New teams/rebrands

- Haas Factory Team was formed by Gene Haas after retaining the sole remaining charter from Stewart–Haas Racing. The team runs the No. 41 car, driven by Cole Custer.
- JTG Daugherty Racing rebranded itself into Hyak Motorsports, following the departure of co-owners Jodi and Tad Geschickter. Brad Daugherty retains his stake in the team's ownership, alongside Gordon Smith, Mark Hughes, and Ernie Cope.
- JR Motorsports debuted in the Cup Series at the 2025 Daytona 500 with the No. 40 car driven by Justin Allgaier. According to the team, no further races are planned.
- Tricon Garage fielded a car in the series for the first time in the 2025 Daytona 500. Martin Truex Jr. drove the No. 56.
- MBM Motorsports rebranded their Cup entry as Garage 66.

Expansions

- 23XI Racing, Front Row Motorsports, and Trackhouse Racing purchased the charters from Stewart–Haas Racing during the 2024 season. 23XI's third team is the No. 35 car, driven by Riley Herbst. FRM's third team is the No. 4 car for Noah Gragson, and Trackhouse's is the No. 88 car, driven by Shane van Gisbergen.
- RFK Racing leased a third charter from Rick Ware Racing to field the No. 60 car full-time, driven by Ryan Preece.

Closures

- Stewart–Haas Racing shut down its operations at the conclusion of the 2024 season.

Manufacturers

- Chevrolet continued to field cars with the Camaro ZL1 body, but without the Camaro branding, as the manufacturer discontinued the car after 2023 with no direct replacement. Instead, the cars were branded as the "ZL1".

Sponsorship

- WeatherTech sponsored Trackhouse Racing for the No. 88 car driven by Shane van Gisbergen during the 2025 season, as it was announced during 2024 season. WeatherTech sponsored van Gisbergen during the 2024 NASCAR Xfinity Series season.
- FedEx did not return to Joe Gibbs Racing, Denny Hamlin, and NASCAR during the 2025 season as it was announced at the end of the 2024 season. In addition, He Gets Us, Mavis Tires & Brakes, and Auto-Owners Insurance have reportedly left JGR after the 2024 season.
- Kroger wouldn't return to Hyak Motorsports for Ricky Stenhouse Jr. during the 2025 season as announced at the end of the 2024 season, as the grocery chain later announced they moved to RFK Racing after the announcement of the third charter. Rate would sponsor the Hyak No. 47 at COTA. Real American Beer, co-founded by former WWE wrestler Hulk Hogan, signed a deal to sponsor the Hyak No. 47 car for Las Vegas 1 and Michigan. Betr would sponsor the No. 47 car at Homestead.
- Love's Travel Stops continued to sponsor Front Row Motorsports's No. 34 car of Todd Gilliland for multiple races in 2025. Todd's father, David, represented Love's at FRM.
- Amazon Prime signed a multi-year deal to serve as sponsor of the Hendrick Motorsports No. 9 car of Chase Elliott, starting in 2025.
- Campbell's joined Joe Gibbs Racing as a partner for the 2025 season after signing a partnership agreement with Harris Blitzer Sports & Entertainment, an investor in JGR.
- Traveller Whiskey, in collaboration with Chris Stapleton, would sponsor JR Motorsports for the No. 40 car driven by Justin Allgaier at the 2025 Daytona 500.
- Winchester Repeating Arms Company joined Bass Pro Shops in sponsoring the Richard Childress Racing No. 3 car driven by Austin Dillon.
- SunnyD signed a multi-year deal to sponsor the Hyak No. 47 for 5 races in 2025. In addition, SunnyD would also sponsor the No. 35 of Riley Herbst at Las Vegas 1.
- Rush Truck Centers followed Noah Gragson from Stewart–Haas Racing to Front Row Motorsports for 2025. They sponsored his No. 4 car in eight races.
- King's Hawaiian ended its partnership with RFK Racing and would now sponsor the Joe Gibbs Racing No. 11 car, reportedly due to a brand conflict with one of RFK's new sponsors. Additionally, National Debt Relief signed on to sponsor the car for four races, Ampm served as a sponsor for two races, and Progressive Insurance agreed to an 18-race sponsorship of the JGR No. 11 car. Bob's Discount Furniture also joined as a sponsor under a multi-year deal in the 2025 season.
- Red Bull would return to NASCAR to sponsor the Trackhouse Racing Nos. 87 and 88 cars for multiple races. The sponsorship reunited Red Bull with Shane van Gisbergen (driver of the 88), who had previously driven Red Bull-sponsored cars in the Supercars Championship for Triple Eight Race Engineering (with whom van Gisbergen won his three titles).
- Saia signed a multi-year deal to sponsor the Joe Gibbs Racing No. 54 driven by Ty Gibbs for seven races in 2025. Sonic signed a deal to sponsor the JGR No. 54 at Atlanta 2.
- PPG Paints sponsored the No. 21 Wood Brothers Racing car driven by Josh Berry at the Brickyard 400.
- Aaron's would return to NASCAR and sponsor Front Row Motorsports Nos. 34 and 38 cars.
- The Backstreet Boys would sponsor the Legacy Motor Club No. 42 car driven by John Hunter Nemechek at Las Vegas 1 to promote the boy band's residency show "Into the Millennium" at the Sphere. The car rental company Hertz sponsored JHN at Dover.
- Robinhood would be the primary sponsor of the No. 23 car driven by Bubba Wallace and the No. 67 car driven by Corey Heim for two races each.
- Telcel sponsored the No. 99 of Trackhouse Racing at the Mexico City race. The company also sponsors Andrés Pérez de Lara in the Craftsman Truck Series.
- Rinnai sponsored the FRM No. 34 at Atlanta 2.
- Fanatics Sportsbook sponsored the NY Racing Team No. 44 car driven by J. J. Yeley at Nashville and Phoenix.

=== Driver changes ===
Moving teams

- Former Stewart-Haas Racing drivers Noah Gragson, Josh Berry, Ryan Preece, and Chase Briscoe moved to Front Row Motorsports, Wood Brothers Racing, RFK Racing, and Joe Gibbs Racing, respectively.
- Michael McDowell moved from Front Row Motorsports to drive the No. 71 car for Spire Motorsports on a multi-year deal, replacing Zane Smith.
- Zane Smith left Spire Motorsports to drive the No. 38 for Front Row Motorsports, replacing Michael McDowell.
- Cody Ware returned to the Rick Ware Racing No. 51 car after driving part-time in the No. 15 car in 2024.
- Corey LaJoie drove part-time in the Rick Ware Racing No. 01 car after driving the No. 51 car for seven races in 2024.

Moving between series

- A. J. Allmendinger moved back to full-time Cup Series competition in the Kaulig Racing No. 16 car after running part-time in 2024.
- Harrison Burton, who was released by Wood Brothers Racing, moved back to the Xfinity Series for AM Racing in 2025.
- Cole Custer moved back to the Cup Series after running full-time in the Xfinity Series for two years.
- Daniel Hemric moved back to the Truck Series to drive the No. 19 truck for McAnally-Hilgemann Racing. Ty Dillon replaced him as the driver of the Kaulig Racing No. 10 car (renumbered from No. 31) after running the Truck Series in 2024.

Retirement

- Martin Truex Jr. retired from full-time competition at the conclusion of the 2024 season, vacating his No. 19 for Joe Gibbs Racing.

Rookies running full-time

- Shane van Gisbergen moved up to the Cup Series full-time after running in the Xfinity Series in 2024.
- Riley Herbst moved up to the Cup Series full-time after running in the Xfinity Series in 2024.

Rookies running part-time

- Katherine Legge made her Cup Series debut in March at the Shriners Children's 500, making her the first woman to compete in the Cup Series since Danica Patrick in the 2018 Daytona 500.
- Connor Zilisch ran races at Austin, Charlotte, and Atlanta. Zilisch was also scheduled to run Watkins Glen, but sustained a broken collarbone after falling from his car after winning the Xfinity race the previous day, forcing his car to withdraw from the race.
- Jesse Love debuted at Bristol for his Xfinity team, Richard Childress Racing. Love split other races during the season between RCR and Beard Motorsports.
- Burt Myers, a modified racing driver, made his official Cup Series debut at Martinsville, after competing in the preliminaries for the exhibition Cook Out Clash.
- Hélio Castroneves, four-time Indianapolis 500 winner, made his Cup Series debut in the Daytona 500. Castroneves made the field with the new Open Exemption Provisional rule, making the race the first since 2015 to have more than 40 cars.

=== Other potential and rumored changes ===
Teams

- Andretti Global has shown interest in expanding its operations into the Cup Series.

Drivers

- Two-time IndyCar champion and two-time Indianapolis 500 winner Josef Newgarden has shown interest in driving in the Cup Series.

== Rule changes ==
=== Pre-season ===
Sources:

- A new "Open Exemption Provisional" rule has been introduced for the NASCAR Cup Series, allowing world-class drivers to compete in a race. These drivers will not earn race points, playoff points, prize money, or tiebreaker advantages based on their finishing position. However, they will retain the win, including the trophy and All-Star eligibility. The second-place finisher will receive first-place points but will not gain playoff points or playoff eligibility.
- Vehicles on the Damaged Vehicle Policy (DVP) may drive to the garage or be towed there if necessary. A repair clock of 7 minutes (8 minutes for Atlanta) is activated for vehicles undergoing repairs on pit road. Once the clock expires, the vehicle must move to the garage to continue repairs but will not be disqualified from the race. If a vehicle cannot reach pit road due to damage or flat tires, it will be towed directly to the garage. Additionally, if a car leaves its pit box and the repair clock expires before it crosses the pit-out yellow line, a penalty will be assessed.
- If a playoff waiver is granted for missing a race (exceptions to the forfeit of playoff points include medical reasons—driver medical, birth of a child, family emergency, etc.—and age restrictions), the driver will forfeit all current and future playoff points (earned prior to the playoffs) and will start the playoffs with a maximum of 2,000 points.
- Rules violations by an OEM may result in a loss of manufacturer points, and/or loss of wind tunnel hours, and/or loss of RCFD runs. Penalties will be assessed for violations of the vehicle testing policy, wind tunnel policy, event roster, and code of conduct policy.
- Suspensions resulting from technical penalties may be deferred, without appeal, to the next race following the penalty. All other suspensions take effect immediately.
- An additional bonus point for the fastest lap in a points paying race event has been introduced. This does not apply to Daytona Duels.

=== In-season ===
- The OEP was adjusted: if there are more than 40 cars, the field will automatically expand to 41, and the team requesting the provisional may use it regardless of qualifying position.
- If a vehicle is serviced in another team's pit stall, it will receive a penalty based on the reason for service: a flag status penalty (restart at the tail of the field or pass-through) for safety issues, or a potential lap(s) penalty for competition adjustments.
- Just before the Brickyard 400, NASCAR introduced a new rule: it may, at its sole discretion, limit the number of race entries to 40. In such cases, open teams will be selected based on the team owner points standings.
  - Four open teams will be eligible for starting grid positions based on the fastest single lap speed posted to each open team's vehicle in the first qualifying round.
  - Up to six open teams will be eligible for starting grid positions based on the highest ranked team owner points standings.

== Schedule ==
The 2025 schedule was released on August 29, 2024, and consists of 30 oval races, 5 road course races, one street track race, and 4 non-championship races to be held on ovals. The start times were announced on November 13.

Bolded races indicate an event generally known as a Crown Jewel race.

O Oval track
R Road course
S Street course

| No | Race name | Track | Location | Date | Time (ET) | TV | Radio |
Regular Season
| | Cook Out Clash | O Bowman Gray Stadium | Winston-Salem, North Carolina | February 2 | 8 pm | Fox | MRN |
| | The Duel at Daytona | O Daytona International Speedway | Daytona Beach, Florida | February 13 | 7 pm | FS1 | MRN |
| 1 | **Daytona 500** | O Daytona International Speedway | Daytona Beach, Florida | February 16 | 1:30 pm (Note: The Daytona 500 was originally scheduled to start at 2:30 pm but was moved up to 1:30 pm due to a forecast for potential inclement weather.) | Fox | MRN |
| 2 | Ambetter Health 400 | O Atlanta Motor Speedway | Hampton, Georgia | February 23 | 3 pm | Fox | PRN |
| 3 | EchoPark Automotive Grand Prix | R Circuit of the Americas | Austin, Texas | March 2 | 3:30 pm | Fox | PRN |
| 4 | Shriners Children's 500 | O Phoenix Raceway | Avondale, Arizona | March 9 | 3:30 pm | FS1 | MRN |
| 5 | Pennzoil 400 | O Las Vegas Motor Speedway | Las Vegas, Nevada | March 16 | 3:30 pm | FS1 | PRN |
| 6 | Straight Talk Wireless 400 | O Homestead–Miami Speedway | Homestead, Florida | March 23 | 3 pm | FS1 | MRN |
| 7 | Cook Out 400 | O Martinsville Speedway | Ridgeway, Virginia | March 30 | 3 pm | FS1 | MRN |
| 8 | Goodyear 400 | O Darlington Raceway | Darlington, South Carolina | April 6 | 3 pm | FS1 | MRN |
| 9 | Food City 500 | O Bristol Motor Speedway | Bristol, Tennessee | April 13 | 3 pm | FS1 | PRN |
| 10 | Jack Link's 500 | O Talladega Superspeedway | Lincoln, Alabama | April 27 | 3 pm | Fox | MRN |
| 11 | Würth 400 | O Texas Motor Speedway | Fort Worth, Texas | May 4 | 3:30 pm | FS1 | PRN |
| 12 | AdventHealth 400 | O Kansas Speedway | Kansas City, Kansas | May 11 | 3 pm | FS1 | MRN |
| | NASCAR All-Star Open | O North Wilkesboro Speedway | North Wilkesboro, North Carolina | May 18 | 5:30 pm | FS1 | MRN |
| | NASCAR All-Star Race | O North Wilkesboro Speedway | North Wilkesboro, North Carolina | May 18 | 8 pm | FS1 | MRN |
| 13 | **Coca-Cola 600** | O Charlotte Motor Speedway | Concord, North Carolina | May 25 | 6 pm | Prime | PRN |
| 14 | Cracker Barrel 400 | O Nashville Superspeedway | Lebanon, Tennessee | June 1 | 7 pm | Prime | PRN |
| 15 | FireKeepers Casino 400 | O Michigan International Speedway | Brooklyn, Michigan | June 8 | 2 pm | Prime | MRN |
| 16 | Viva México 250 | R Autódromo Hermanos Rodríguez | Mexico City, Mexico | June 15 | 3 pm | Prime | MRN |
| 17 | The Great American Getaway 400 | O Pocono Raceway | Long Pond, Pennsylvania | June 22 | 2 pm | Prime | MRN |
NASCAR In-Season Challenge
| 18 | Quaker State 400 | O Atlanta Motor Speedway | Hampton, Georgia | June 28 | 7 pm | TNT | PRN |
| 19 | Grant Park 165 | S Chicago Street Course | Chicago, Illinois | July 6 | 2 pm | TNT | MRN |
| 20 | Toyota/Save Mart 350 | R Sonoma Raceway | Sonoma, California | July 13 | 3:30 pm | TNT | PRN |
| 21 | Autotrader EchoPark Automotive 400 | O Dover Motor Speedway | Dover, Delaware | July 20 | 2 pm | TNT | PRN |
| 22 | **Brickyard 400** | O Indianapolis Motor Speedway | Speedway, Indiana | July 27 | 2 pm | TNT | IMS |
Regular Season
| 23 | Iowa Corn 350 | O Iowa Speedway | Newton, Iowa | August 3 | 3:30 pm | USA | MRN |
| 24 | Go Bowling at The Glen | R Watkins Glen International | Watkins Glen, New York | August 10 | 2 pm | USA | MRN |
| 25 | Cook Out 400 | O Richmond Raceway | Richmond, Virginia | August 16 | 7:30 pm | USA | MRN |
| 26 | Coke Zero Sugar 400 | O Daytona International Speedway | Daytona Beach, Florida | August 23 | 7:30 pm | NBC | MRN |
NASCAR Cup Series Playoffs
Round of 16
| 27 | **Cook Out Southern 500** | O Darlington Raceway | Darlington, South Carolina | August 31 | 6 pm | USA | MRN |
| 28 | Enjoy Illinois 300 | O World Wide Technology Raceway | Madison, Illinois | September 7 | 3 pm | USA | MRN |
| 29 | Bass Pro Shops Night Race | O Bristol Motor Speedway | Bristol, Tennessee | September 13 | 7:30 pm | USA | PRN |
Round of 12
| 30 | Mobil 1 301 | O New Hampshire Motor Speedway | Loudon, New Hampshire | September 21 | 2 pm | USA | PRN |
| 31 | Hollywood Casino 400 | O Kansas Speedway | Kansas City, Kansas | September 28 | 3 pm | USA | MRN |
| 32 | Bank of America Roval 400 | R Charlotte Motor Speedway (Roval) | Concord, North Carolina | October 5 | 3 pm | USA | PRN |
Round of 8
| 33 | South Point 400 | O Las Vegas Motor Speedway | Las Vegas, Nevada | October 12 | 5:30 pm | USA | PRN |
| 34 | YellaWood 500 | O Talladega Superspeedway | Lincoln, Alabama | October 19 | 2 pm | NBC | MRN |
| 35 | Xfinity 500 | O Martinsville Speedway | Ridgeway, Virginia | October 26 | 2 pm | NBC | MRN |
Championship 4
| 36 | NASCAR Cup Series Championship Race | O Phoenix Raceway | Avondale, Arizona | November 2 | 3 pm | NBC | MRN |

=== Confirmed schedule changes ===
- The Quaker State 400 at Atlanta Motor Speedway moved back to the regular season, becoming the opening race for the new NASCAR in-season tournament.
- The Cook Out Clash moved to Bowman Gray Stadium, replacing the Los Angeles Memorial Coliseum. It will be the first Cup Series race held at the track since 1971.
- Autódromo Hermanos Rodríguez held a points paying race, becoming the first points paying Cup race outside the US since 1958. Richmond Raceway lost a date to accommodate this change.
- The race at World Wide Technology Raceway, New Hampshire Motor Speedway, and the Southern 500 at Darlington Raceway, moved to the playoff schedule. As part of this schedule change, Watkins Glen International, Homestead–Miami Speedway, and the Quaker State 400 at Atlanta, moved to the regular season.
- Easter Sunday became a bye week for the first time since 2021, it was placed between the Food City 500 and the Jack Link's 500.
- On November 20, 2024, NASCAR announced that the race at Circuit of the Americas would convert into a 2.3-mile layout.

=== New media rights deal ===
NASCAR started the first year of a 7 year TV deal, lasting until 2031. In this deal Fox will broadcast twelve races (including the Clash, Daytona Duels, and All-Star Race), while NBC will broadcast fourteen races. Prime Video and TNT will broadcast five races each. In addition, the season marked the debut of NASCAR's In-Season Challenge, which was won by Ty Gibbs.

== Season summary ==
=== Preseason ===
Exhibition: Cook Out Clash

Chase Elliott secured the pole position for the 200-lap race featuring a 23-car field with notable drivers such as Austin Dillon, Zane Smith, and Ty Gibbs failing to qualify. Elliott dominated the race, leading 171 laps, winning the race and earning his first career Clash win.

Exhibition: The Duel at Daytona

In the first duel, Bubba Wallace clinched victory in the 60-lap race, which featured a 23-car field. Notably, drivers such as Zane Smith and Chase Briscoe failed to finish the race. Wallace led 21 laps, securing the win and earning 10 points.

In the second duel, Austin Cindric started from the pole position in a 23-car field. The race concluded dramatically when a caution was called just before the finish line, leading NASCAR to declare Cindric the winner over Erik Jones, as he was ahead at the time of the caution.

=== Regular season ===
Round 1: Daytona 500

William Byron overtook pole-sitter Chase Briscoe early before the race was red flagged on lap 11 for a weather delay in the area. After nearly 4 hours under the red flag, involving 2 red flags, the race promptly resumed. Joey Logano won the first stage, but had engine issues that forced him to the back of the pack. Ross Chastain got turned and collected Shane van Gisbergen, Martin Truex Jr., Josh Berry, and Hélio Castroneves while Ryan Blaney edged out Austin Cindric and won the second stage. Ricky Stenhouse Jr. made contact with Logano and collected Kyle Busch, Chase Elliott, Noah Gragson, and Todd Gilliland. With 5 laps to go, as the field entered the backstretch, Cole Custer turned Christopher Bell into the wall, resulting in Ryan Preece flipping mid-air, resulting in overtime. On the final lap, Custer made contact with Denny Hamlin and caused a huge wreck as Byron snuck his way through and held off Tyler Reddick and Jimmie Johnson to win his second consecutive Daytona 500, becoming the fifth driver in history to do so. This was the 10th Daytona 500 win for Hendrick Motorsports, surpassing Petty Enterprises for the most all-time by a race team.

Round 2: Ambetter Health 400

Ryan Blaney scored the pole for the race. Josh Berry won the first stage and Kyle Larson won the second stage, his first stage win on a drafting track. On lap 150, Chase Elliott, Brad Keselowski and Corey LaJoie were in a wreck, sending both Keselowski and LaJoie out. On lap 184, a wreck with Ricky Stenhouse Jr., Noah Gragson, Daniel Suárez, Ty Gibbs, Cody Ware, Cole Custer, and J. J. Yeley occurred sending them all out of the race. With 4 laps to go, as the field entered the backstretch, Larson hit Austin Cindric and William Byron resulting in overtime. On the final lap, Berry, Justin Haley and Ryan Preece collided on the backstretch with caution being deployed just when Christopher Bell snuck his way through Carson Hocevar and Larson to win his first Atlanta race.

Round 3: EchoPark Automotive Grand Prix

Tyler Reddick scored the pole for the race. Bubba Wallace won the first stage, his first on a road course and after Shane van Gisbergen pitted, Ryan Preece won the second stage, his first stage win since the 2023 Martinsville spring race. Christopher Bell ended up winning the race, after an intense battle between Kyle Busch, William Byron, and Reddick. 18-year-old Connor Zilisch made his Cup Series debut with Trackhouse Racing, but was involved in a wreck with teammate Daniel Suárez.

Round 4: Shriners Children's 500

William Byron won the pole. Byron won the first stage and Christopher Bell won the second stage. On lap 99, Brad Keselowski, Carson Hocevar, Riley Herbst, Justin Haley, Chase Briscoe, Austin Dillon, and Cole Custer, and Shane van Gisbergen were involved in a huge pile-up, sending them all out. Bell would end up getting his third consecutive win, becoming the first to do so since Kyle Larson in 2021, and the first since the debut of the Next Gen car.

Round 5: Pennzoil 400 presented by Jiffy Lube

Michael McDowell won the pole, marking the first pole won by Spire Motorsports. Austin Cindric won the first stage and Kyle Larson won the second stage. Josh Berry won the race, after battling Daniel Suárez to earn his first career win in the Cup Series and the 101st career win for the Wood Brothers.

Round 6: Straight Talk Wireless 400

Alex Bowman won the pole. Ryan Blaney won the first stage and Denny Hamlin won the second stage. On Lap 207, after leading 124 laps, Blaney's engine blew up, ending his day early. After overtaking teammate Alex Bowman with less than 10 to go, Kyle Larson claimed his 30th career win. In an attempt to perform a weekend sweep, Larson ended up getting a win in the Truck Series race 2 days earlier, however came up just short of a victory during the Xfinity Series race.

Round 7: Cook Out 400

Christopher Bell won the pole. Joey Logano won the first stage and Denny Hamlin won the second stage. Hamlin would end up leading 274 laps en route to his first win of 2025.

Round 8: Goodyear 400

William Byron won the pole. Byron dominated early, leading the opening 243 laps and sweeping the stages. It was the most laps Byron has ever led in a single race. After a late-race caution with 4 laps to go, Denny Hamlin took the lead after pit stops. On the ensuing green-white-checkered restart, he held off Byron and Christopher Bell to win for the second straight week.

Round 9: Food City 500

Alex Bowman won the pole. Kyle Larson swept the stages, and led 411 laps en route to his second consecutive win at Bristol. Larson attempted to sweep the weekend again, winning the Xfinity Series race the previous day, but came up just short with a 2nd place in the Truck Series race.

Round 10: Jack Link's 500

Zane Smith won his first career pole. On lap 43, Brad Keselowski, who made contact with Kyle Busch, would end up collecting former teammate Ryan Blaney after attempting to pit, ending his and Blaney's day early. Kyle Larson won the first stage and Bubba Wallace won the second stage. Austin Cindric would win the race, edging out Ryan Preece by 0.022 seconds for the 29th closest finish in NASCAR history. Preece and Joey Logano were disqualified after post race inspection.

Round 11: Würth 400 presented by LIQUI MOLY

Carson Hocevar won his first career pole. Denny Hamlin's car caught on fire, ending stage one early, with Austin Cindric winning the stage. Chris Buescher caused a debris caution ending stage two early, with Kyle Larson winning the stage. After a caution filled event, Joey Logano won the race in overtime.

Round 12: AdventHealth 400

Kyle Larson won the pole. Larson dominated the race, leading 221 laps, sweeping the stages, and setting the fastest lap. Larson ended up winning the race and winning his second consecutive Kansas spring race, also winning the 2024 AdventHealth 400.

Exhibition: NASCAR All-Star Race

Shane van Gisbergen won the pole for the Open, while Brad Keselowski and Christopher Bell won their heat races on Saturday, earning the pole and second-place starting positions for the main event, respectively. Carson Hocevar won the Open race, with John Hunter Nemechek finishing second, and Noah Gragson advancing as the fan vote winner. All three transferred into Sunday night's main event.

In the early laps, Brad Keselowski and Joey Logano battled for position, with Joey Logano eventually taking the lead and controlling much of the race. When the "Promoter's Caution" came out on lap 216, the field split on pit strategy. Five drivers, including race leader Logano, stayed out on older tires. On the restart, Bell who had taken two fresh tires and restarted sixth, used the tire advantage to pass the five drivers that stayed out and secure his first All-Star Race victory.

Round 13: Coca-Cola 600

Chase Briscoe won the pole. Duels sparked within the stages late, however William Byron swept all three stages, the first time a driver swept all three stages since the 2021 race. Byron led the race late, however, Ross Chastain passed Byron with 6 laps to go and won his first career Coca-Cola 600, coming from 40th place.

Round 14: Cracker Barrel 400

Chase Briscoe won the pole. Denny Hamlin won the first stage. Ryan Blaney won the second stage. Blaney dominated the last stage and won the race, earning his first victory of the season.

Round 15: FireKeepers Casino 400

Chase Briscoe won his third consecutive pole. Chris Buescher won the first stage. On lap 67, Alex Bowman hit the outside wall hard, sending out the red flag, and ending his day early. William Byron won the second stage. After an intense battle between Denny Hamlin, Ty Gibbs and Byron, involving clear air and fuel mileage, Hamlin took the lead with 4 laps to go and won the race, days before his third child was born, and his first victory at Michigan since 2011.

Round 16: Viva México 250

In the first international race for NASCAR since 1958, Shane van Gisbergen won the pole. After the race started, a caution quickly flew for rain, NASCAR then allowed teams to use wet weather tires. Ryan Preece won the first stage, and van Gisbergen won the second stage. van Gisbergen dominated the race, leading 60 laps, and won, getting his first win since the 2023 Grant Park 220.

Round 17: The Great American Getaway 400 presented by VISITPA

Denny Hamlin won the pole. Hamlin led every lap of stage one, and Chase Briscoe won the second stage. Briscoe held off a speedy Hamlin to get his first win of the season, as well as his first win with Joe Gibbs Racing and Toyota.

Round 18: Quaker State 400 available at Walmart

Joey Logano won the pole, with Ford sweeping the top eight spots. Austin Cindric won the first stage, and Tyler Reddick won the second stage by .001 seconds over Chase Elliott. A large wreck on Lap 69 damaged 22 cars, taking out several leaders. Elliott won the race on a last lap pass of Brad Keselowski, ending his 44-race winless streak.

Round 19: Grant Park 165

Shane van Gisbergen won the pole. On lap 2, Carson Hocevar hit the inside barrier of turn 9, causing an early red flag, as well as collecting many cars. Michael McDowell won the first stage, giving Spire Motorsports their first stage win, and Ryan Blaney won the second stage. Shane van Gisbergen won the race, continuing his success at the Street Race, also winning the previous day's Xfinity race and sweeping the weekend. van Gisbergen also made history, becoming the winningest non-American driver in the Cup Series.

Round 20: Toyota/Save Mart 350

Shane van Gisbergen won his second consecutive pole. Ross Chastain won stage one, and van Gisbergen won stage 2. Van Gisbergen once again dominated on a road course, winning the race and going back to back.

Round 21: Autotrader EchoPark Automotive 400

Chase Elliott won the pole after both practice and qualifying were canceled. Elliott won the first stage and Christopher Bell won the second stage. Late in the final stage, rain caused a red flag for about an hour. Denny Hamlin held off teammate Chase Briscoe for his second consecutive win at Dover.

Round 22: Brickyard 400

Chase Briscoe won the pole, with Toyota sweeping the first five spots. Briscoe made history for becoming the first Indiana native to win the pole for the race, as well as becoming the first driver to win poles for the Daytona 500, Coca-Cola 600, and Brickyard 400 in the same season. Briscoe won the first stage, and Ryan Blaney won the second stage. After rain halted the race for around 30 minutes, Bubba Wallace had enough fuel to hold off Kyle Larson to get his first Crown Jewel win, becoming the first African-American to win a major race at Indianapolis Motor Speedway. He also snapped a 100-race winless streak dating back to the 2022 Hollywood Casino 400.

Round 23: Iowa Corn 350 powered by Ethanol

Chase Briscoe won his second consecutive pole. Brad Keselowski swept the stages, the first time he swept both stages in a race since the 2017 First Data 500. After many cautions and a long green flag run, William Byron won the race after saving enough fuel.

Round 24: Go Bowling at The Glen

Ryan Blaney won the pole. Prior to this race, Connor Zilisch was supposed to race. However, due to his injury sustained the previous day, Trackhouse Racing announced that they would withdraw the No. 87 from the race. Defending race winner Chris Buescher won the first stage and Blaney won the second stage. Shane van Gisbergen won the race, surpassing Tony Stewart and Jimmie Johnson for most wins in a season by a rookie with 4 wins.

Round 25: Cook Out 400

Ryan Preece won the pole. Tyler Reddick won the first stage, and Bubba Wallace won the second stage. On Lap 198, an 11-car wreck in turns 3 and 4 took Chase Elliott and Justin Haley out of the race early. During the final stage, Austin Dillon and Ryan Blaney traded the lead several times. Dillon pulled away after the final pit stop and won the race, making his first trip to the Playoffs since 2022.

Round 26: Coke Zero Sugar 400

Ryan Blaney won the pole after qualifying was canceled. Kyle Larson won the first stage, and Ross Chastain won the second stage. Within the final laps, playoff upsets such as Erik Jones, Daniel Suárez, Justin Haley, and Cole Custer were all in the front during the final laps. However, Blaney overtook Custer on the backstretch of the final lap, giving him his second win of the season and second win at Daytona as Tyler Reddick and Alex Bowman clinched the final two playoff spots.

=== Playoffs ===
Round 27: Cook Out Southern 500

Denny Hamlin won the pole. On Lap 1, Josh Berry slid his car into Tyler Reddick and caused a multi-car wreck. Chase Briscoe swept the stages, the first time he accomplished said feat in his career. Briscoe dominated the race, leading 309 laps. A hard-charging Reddick came close to passing him off the last turn of the last lap, but Briscoe managed to hold on, defending his win from last year and becoming the first back-to-back Southern 500 winner since Greg Biffle in 2005 and 2006.

Round 28: Enjoy Illinois 300 presented by TicketSmarter

Denny Hamlin won the pole. Chase Briscoe won the first stage, and Bubba Wallace won the second stage. Hamlin dominated the last half of the day, leading 75 laps and winning the race. This was the 200th win for Toyota in the NASCAR Cup Series.

Round 29: Bass Pro Shops Night Race

A. J. Allmendinger won the pole, his first pole since the 2015 Cheez-It 355 at The Glen. Ryan Blaney won the first stage after a side-by-side finish with Ty Gibbs. Gibbs won the second stage. During the third stage, Goodyear allowed teams an extra set for the race, as the race had been plagued with tire issues. After an intense final stage, with drivers playing playoff spoiler, such as Zane Smith, Carson Hocevar, and Corey Heim, Christopher Bell won the race as Alex Bowman, Austin Dillon, Shane van Gisbergen, and Josh Berry were eliminated from the playoffs.

Round 30: Mobil 1 301

Joey Logano won the pole. Ryan Blaney won the first stage, and Logano won the second stage. Around lap 110, Joe Gibbs Racing teammates Denny Hamlin and Christopher Bell were battling their JGR teammate Ty Gibbs; on lap 111, Hamlin got impatient with Gibbs and spun him. Blaney won the race.

Round 31: Hollywood Casino 400

Chase Briscoe won the pole. Denny Hamlin swept the stages. On lap 268, Zane Smith flipped his car, also causing overtime. Bubba Wallace was in contention to win, but on the last lap, he and Hamlin made contact, allowing Chase Elliott to slip by and steal the win, claiming his first multi-win season since 2022.

Round 32: Bank of America Roval 400

Tyler Reddick won the pole. Shane van Gisbergen won the first stage, and Ryan Blaney won the second stage. During stage 3, Ross Chastain and Joey Logano fought over the last remaining spot in the Round of 8. Logano had the tiebreaker and advanced once they both crossed the finish line. Van Gisbergen dominated the race, earning his fifth consecutive win on a road course.

Round 33: South Point 400

Denny Hamlin won the pole. William Byron won the first stage, and Kyle Larson won the second stage. Hamlin passed Chase Briscoe with 4 laps to go in the race and earned his 60th career win, tying him with Kevin Harvick for 10th all-time. Hamlin clinched his first Championship 4 appearance since 2021 and his first Championship 4 appearance in the Next-Gen car.

Round 34: YellaWood 500

Michael McDowell won the pole. Chase Elliott wrecked out early in a multi-car crash, while Ty Gibbs won stage 1, and Chase Briscoe won stage 2. Kyle Larson lead at the white flag but ran out of fuel down the backstretch. Chase Briscoe won the race, and clinched his first Championship 4 berth, and first with Joe Gibbs Racing.

Round 35: Xfinity 500

William Byron won the pole and swept the stages. Byron dominated the race, Ryan Blaney put up a fight after a late race caution, but could not prevail, as Byron won. Both he and Kyle Larson made the Championship 4.

Round 36: NASCAR Cup Series Championship Race

Denny Hamlin won the pole. William Byron won the first stage, and Hamlin won the second stage. Hamlin dominated majority of the race, coming as close as 3 laps to go before becoming a Champion. However, a late race caution caused by Byron cutting a tire and hitting the wall diminished his lead. Restarting in overtime Kyle Larson took advantage by taking 2 tires on the ensuing pit stop while Hamlin took 4, prompting Larson to gain track position over him. Ryan Blaney passed Brad Keselowski and held off both him and Larson to get his first win at Phoenix, while Larson won his 2nd Championship, and first since 2021.

== Results and standings ==
=== Race results ===
| No. | Race | Pole position | Most laps led | Fastest race lap | Winning driver | Manufacturer | Report |
|---|---|---|---|---|---|---|---|
| | Cook Out Clash | Chase Elliott | Chase Elliott | —N/a | Chase Elliott | Chevrolet | Report |
| | Duel 1 at Daytona | Chase Briscoe | Bubba Wallace | —N/a | Bubba Wallace | Toyota | Report |
| | Duel 2 at Daytona | Austin Cindric | Erik Jones | —N/a | Austin Cindric | Ford | Report |
| 1 | Daytona 500 | Chase Briscoe | Austin Cindric | Michael McDowell | William Byron | Chevrolet | Report |
| 2 | Ambetter Health 400 | Ryan Blaney | Joey Logano | A. J. Allmendinger | Christopher Bell | Toyota | Report |
| 3 | EchoPark Automotive Grand Prix | Tyler Reddick | Kyle Busch | Kyle Larson | Christopher Bell | Toyota | Report |
| 4 | Shriners Children's 500 | William Byron | Christopher Bell | Michael McDowell | Christopher Bell | Toyota | Report |
| 5 | Pennzoil 400 | Michael McDowell | Kyle Larson | Tyler Reddick | Josh Berry | Ford | Report |
| 6 | Straight Talk Wireless 400 | Alex Bowman | Ryan Blaney | Bubba Wallace | Kyle Larson | Chevrolet | Report |
| 7 | Cook Out 400 | Christopher Bell | Denny Hamlin | Denny Hamlin | Denny Hamlin | Toyota | Report |
| 8 | Goodyear 400 | William Byron | William Byron | William Byron | Denny Hamlin | Toyota | Report |
| 9 | Food City 500 | Alex Bowman | Kyle Larson | A. J. Allmendinger | Kyle Larson | Chevrolet | Report |
| 10 | Jack Link's 500 | Zane Smith | Ty Gibbs | Michael McDowell | Austin Cindric | Ford | Report |
| 11 | Würth 400 | Carson Hocevar | Kyle Larson | Carson Hocevar | Joey Logano | Ford | Report |
| 12 | AdventHealth 400 | Kyle Larson | Kyle Larson | Kyle Larson | Kyle Larson | Chevrolet | Report |
| | NASCAR All-Star Open | Shane van Gisbergen | Shane van Gisbergen | —N/a | Carson Hocevar | Chevrolet | Report |
| | NASCAR All-Star Race | Brad Keselowski | Joey Logano | —N/a | Christopher Bell | Toyota | Report |
| 13 | Coca-Cola 600 | Chase Briscoe | William Byron | Denny Hamlin | Ross Chastain | Chevrolet | Report |
| 14 | Cracker Barrel 400 | Chase Briscoe | Ryan Blaney | Denny Hamlin | Ryan Blaney | Ford | Report |
| 15 | FireKeepers Casino 400 | Chase Briscoe | William Byron | William Byron | Denny Hamlin | Toyota | Report |
| 16 | Viva México 250 | Shane van Gisbergen | Shane van Gisbergen | Kyle Larson | Shane van Gisbergen | Chevrolet | Report |
| 17 | The Great American Getaway 400 | Denny Hamlin | Chase Briscoe | Denny Hamlin | Chase Briscoe | Toyota | Report |
| 18 | Quaker State 400 | Joey Logano | Joey Logano | John Hunter Nemechek | Chase Elliott | Chevrolet | Report |
| 19 | Grant Park 165 | Shane van Gisbergen | Michael McDowell | Tyler Reddick | Shane van Gisbergen | Chevrolet | Report |
| 20 | Toyota/Save Mart 350 | Shane van Gisbergen | Shane van Gisbergen | Justin Haley | Shane van Gisbergen | Chevrolet | Report |
| 21 | Autotrader EchoPark Automotive 400 | Chase Elliott | Chase Elliott | Denny Hamlin | Denny Hamlin | Toyota | Report |
| 22 | Brickyard 400 | Chase Briscoe | Austin Cindric | Denny Hamlin | Bubba Wallace | Toyota | Report |
| 23 | Iowa Corn 350 | Chase Briscoe | William Byron | Brad Keselowski | William Byron | Chevrolet | Report |
| 24 | Go Bowling at The Glen | Ryan Blaney | Shane van Gisbergen | Kyle Larson | Shane van Gisbergen | Chevrolet | Report |
| 25 | Cook Out 400 | Ryan Preece | Bubba Wallace | Bubba Wallace | Austin Dillon | Chevrolet | Report |
| 26 | Coke Zero Sugar 400 | Ryan Blaney | Ryan Blaney; Joey Logano (Note: Blaney and Logano both led 27 laps.) | A. J. Allmendinger | Ryan Blaney | Ford | Report |
NASCAR Cup Series Playoffs
Round of 16
| 27 | Cook Out Southern 500 | Denny Hamlin | Chase Briscoe | Josh Berry | Chase Briscoe | Toyota | Report |
| 28 | Enjoy Illinois 300 | Denny Hamlin | Denny Hamlin | Denny Hamlin | Denny Hamlin | Toyota | Report |
| 29 | Bass Pro Shops Night Race | A. J. Allmendinger | Ty Gibbs | A. J. Allmendinger | Christopher Bell | Toyota | Report |
Round of 12
| 30 | Mobil 1 301 | Joey Logano | Joey Logano | Carson Hocevar | Ryan Blaney | Ford | Report |
| 31 | Hollywood Casino 400 | Chase Briscoe | Denny Hamlin | Denny Hamlin | Chase Elliott | Chevrolet | Report |
| 32 | Bank of America Roval 400 | Tyler Reddick | Shane van Gisbergen | Tyler Reddick | Shane van Gisbergen | Chevrolet | Report |
Round of 8
| 33 | South Point 400 | Denny Hamlin | Kyle Larson | Chase Briscoe | Denny Hamlin | Toyota | Report |
| 34 | YellaWood 500 | Michael McDowell | Joey Logano | Michael McDowell | Chase Briscoe | Toyota | Report |
| 35 | Xfinity 500 | William Byron | William Byron | William Byron | William Byron | Chevrolet | Report |
Championship 4
| 36 | NASCAR Cup Series Championship Race | Denny Hamlin | Denny Hamlin | Denny Hamlin | Ryan Blaney | Ford | Report |

=== Drivers' championship ===
(Key) Bold – Pole position awarded by time. Italics – Pole position set by competition-based formula. * – Most laps led. ^{F} – Fastest lap. ^{1} – Stage 1 winner. ^{2} – Stage 2 winner. ^{3} – Stage 3 winner. (Note: Stage 3 Winner only for the Coca-Cola 600)^{1–10} - Regular season top 10 finishers.
. – Eliminated after Round of 16 . – Eliminated after Round of 12 . – Eliminated after Round of 8

| Pos. | Driver | DAY | ATL | COA | PHO | LVS | HOM | MAR | DAR | BRI | TAL | TEX | KAN | CLT | NSS | MCH | MXC | POC | ATL | CSC | SON | DOV | IND | IOW | GLN | RCH | DAY | DAR | GTW | BRI | NHA | KAN | ROV | LVS | TAL | MAR | PHO | Pts. | Stages | Bonus |
|---|---|---|---|---|---|---|---|---|---|---|---|---|---|---|---|---|---|---|---|---|---|---|---|---|---|---|---|---|---|---|---|---|---|---|---|---|---|---|---|---|
| 1 | Kyle Larson | 20 | 3^{2} | 32^{F} | 3 | 9*^{2} | 1 | 5 | 37 | 1*^{12} | 2^{1} | 4*^{2} | **1***^{12F} | 37 | 8 | 5 | 36^{F} | 7 | 17 | 13 | 35 | 4 | 2 | 28 | 39^{F} | 6 | 6^{1} | 19 | 12 | 32 | 7 | 6 | 2 | 2*^{2} | 26 | 5 | 3 | 5034 | – | 32^{3} |
| 2 | Denny Hamlin | 24 | 6 | 21 | 2 | 25 | 5^{2} | 1*^{2F} | 1 | 2 | 21 | 38 | 36 | 16^{F} | 3^{1F} | 1 | | **2**^{1F} | 31 | 4 | 20 | 1^{F} | 3^{F} | 24 | 25 | 10 | 25 | **7** | **1***^{F} | 31 | 12 | 2*^{12F} | 23 | **1** | 24 | 35 | **6***^{2F} | 5031 | – | 36^{6} |
| 3 | Chase Briscoe | **4** | 21 | 14 | 35 | 17 | 4 | 9 | 28 | 4 | 15 | 27 | 4 | **3** | **17** | **23** | 7 | 1*^{2} | 35 | 23 | 2 | 2 | **18**^{1} | **2** | 5 | 13 | 23 | 1*^{12} | 2^{1} | 9 | 10 | **4** | 14 | 4^{F} | 1^{2} | 37 | 18 | 5019 | – | 18^{8} |
| 4 | William Byron | 1 | 27 | 2 | **6**^{1} | 4 | 12 | 22 | **2***^{12F} | 6 | 3 | 13 | 24 | 2*^{123} | 5 | 28*^{2F} | 9 | 27 | 37 | 40 | 8 | 32 | 16 | 1* | 4 | 12 | 19 | 21 | 11 | 12 | 3 | 9 | 11 | 36^{1} | 25 | **1***^{12F} | 33^{1} | 5004 | – | 33^{1} |
NASCAR Cup Series Playoffs cut-off
| Pos. | Driver | DAY | ATL | COA | PHO | LVS | HOM | MAR | DAR | BRI | TAL | TEX | KAN | CLT | NSS | MCH | MXC | POC | ATL | CSC | SON | DOV | IND | IOW | GLN | RCH | DAY | DAR | GTW | BRI | NHA | KAN | ROV | LVS | TAL | MAR | PHO | Pts. | Stages | Bonus |
| 5 | Christopher Bell | 31 | 1 | 1 | 1*^{2} | 12 | 29 | **2** | 3 | 8 | 35 | 9 | 2 | 8 | 10 | 16 | 2 | 17 | 30 | 24 | 5 | 18^{2} | 8 | 17 | 2 | 21 | 13 | 29 | 7 | 1 | 6 | 3 | 3 | 3 | 8 | 7 | 11 | 2403 | 33 | 28^{5} |
| 6 | Ryan Blaney | 7^{2} | **4** | 19 | 28 | 35 | 36*^{1} | 11 | 5 | 5 | 37 | 3 | 3 | 38 | 1*^{2} | 32 | 14 | 3 | 40 | 12^{2} | 36 | 8 | 7^{2} | 4 | **6**^{2} | 3 | 1* | 18 | 4 | 4^{1} | 1^{1} | 24 | 13^{2} | 38 | 23 | 2 | 1 | 2373 | 32 | 34^{2} |
| 7 | Joey Logano | 35^{1} | 12* | 24 | 13 | 15 | 14 | 8^{1} | 13 | 24 | 39 | 1 | 9 | 17 | 4 | 22 | 21 | 16 | **36*** | 11 | 9 | 14 | 32 | 9 | 14 | 4 | 27* | 20 | 5 | 5 | **4***^{2} | 21 | 20 | 6 | 16* | 8 | 4 | 2330 | 23 | 8 |
| 8 | Chase Elliott | 15 | 20 | 4 | 10 | 10 | 18 | 4 | 8 | 15 | 5 | 16 | 15 | 6 | 15 | 15 | 3 | 5 | 1 | 16 | 3 | 6*^{1} | 13 | 14 | 26 | 38 | 10 | 17 | 3 | 38 | 5 | 1 | 8 | 18 | 40 | 3 | 10 | 2310 | 21 | 18^{4} |
| 9 | Tyler Reddick | 2 | 19 | **3** | 20 | 24^{F} | 8 | 14 | 4 | 18 | 14 | 21 | 17 | 26 | 9 | 13 | 20 | 32 | 4^{2} | 3^{F} | 6 | 12 | 29 | 19 | 9 | 34^{1} | 21 | 2 | 16 | 15 | 21 | 7 | **10**^{F} | 5 | 7 | 11 | 26 | 2309 | 34 | 6^{7} |
| 10 | Ross Chastain | 40 | 8 | 12 | 11 | 5 | 31 | 6 | 7 | 7 | 20 | 2 | 18 | 1 | 11 | 6 | 16 | 26 | 33 | 10 | 24^{1} | 33 | 39 | 11 | 10 | 19 | 15^{2} | 11 | 24 | 19 | 9 | 11 | 21 | 23 | 13 | 4 | 13 | 2272 | 27 | 7 |
| 11 | Bubba Wallace | 29 | 9 | 20^{1} | 29 | 28 | 3^{F} | 3 | 21 | 19 | 8^{2} | 33 | 33 | 35 | 6 | 4 | 12 | 36 | 22 | 28 | 26 | 7 | 1 | 6 | 8 | 28*^{2F} | 37 | 6 | 8^{2} | 34 | 26 | 5 | 15 | 22 | 4 | 18 | 37 | 2256 | 16 | 9 |
| 12 | Shane van Gisbergen **(R)** | 33 | 23 | 6 | 31 | 34 | 32 | 34 | 20 | 38 | 29 | 22 | 20 | 14 | 25 | 18 | **1***^{2} | 31 | 24 | **1** | **1***^{2} | 30 | 19 | 31 | 1* | 14 | 16 | 32 | 25 | 26 | 32 | 10 | 1*^{1} | 33 | 11 | 14 | 24 | 2211 | 23 | 22 |
| 13 | Alex Bowman | 6 | 26 | 9 | 7 | 7 | **2** | 27 | 35 | **37** | 7 | 35 | 5 | 29 | 36 | 36 | 4 | 11 | 3 | 8 | 19 | 3 | 9 | 7 | 20 | 2 | 36 | 31 | 26 | 8 | 15 | 28 | 18 | 7 | 29 | 23 | 15 | 2192 | 20 | 2^{9} |
| 14 | Austin Cindric | 8* | 28 | 25 | 19 | 6^{1} | 19 | 37 | 11 | 17 | 1 | 25^{1} | 11 | 31 | 18 | 31 | 18 | 10 | 38^{1} | 27 | 30 | 16 | 15* | 12 | 16 | 5 | 39 | 12 | 19 | 30 | 17 | 30 | 36 | 11 | 34 | 15 | 27 | 2156 | 8 | 8 |
| 15 | Austin Dillon | 23 | 16 | 35 | 12 | 32 | 13 | 18 | 23 | 10 | 10 | 7 | 22 | 20 | 29 | 19 | 28 | 24 | 20 | 36 | 21 | 15 | 38 | 10 | 15 | 1 | 24 | 23 | 18 | 28 | 13 | 27 | 31 | 25 | 27 | 16 | 20 | 2152 | 5 | 5 |
| 16 | Josh Berry | 37 | 25^{1} | 26 | 4 | 1 | 17 | 32 | 36 | 12 | 26 | 32 | 6 | 12 | 30 | 12 | 26 | 12 | 32 | 34 | 13 | 28 | 22 | 13 | 35 | 8 | 9 | 38^{F} | 36 | 39 | 2 | 33 | 16 | 26 | 33 | 10 | 7 | 2150 | 8 | 6 |
| 17 | Chris Buescher | 10 | 30 | 7 | 5 | 13 | 6 | 24 | 6 | 25 | 34 | 18 | 8 | 22 | 14 | 2^{1} | 10 | 4 | 9 | 18 | 16 | 9 | 14 | 22 | 3^{1} | 30 | 7 | 10 | 9 | 11 | 18 | 15 | 4 | 12 | 30 | 29 | 12 | 889 | 103 | 2^{10} |
| 18 | Ryan Preece | 32 | 18 | 33^{2} | 15 | 3 | 9 | 7 | 26 | 20 | 38 | 29 | 7 | 9 | 28 | 9 | 15^{1} | 8 | 15 | 7 | 12 | 19 | 4 | 5 | 13 | **35** | 14 | 16 | 13 | 21 | 14 | 26 | 6 | 9 | 15 | 6 | 9 | 861 | 97 | 2 |
| 19 | Ty Gibbs | 16 | 32 | 34 | 25 | 22 | 25 | 13 | 9 | 3 | 17* | 23 | 28 | 24 | 31 | 3 | 11 | 14 | 14 | 2 | 7 | 5 | 21 | 21 | 33 | 18 | 8 | 22 | 10 | 10*^{2} | 35 | 25 | 12 | 34 | 3^{1} | 12 | 21 | 783 | 94 | – |
| 20 | Brad Keselowski | 26 | 39 | 15 | 33 | 11 | 26 | 26 | 33 | 16 | 36 | 28 | 37 | 5 | 23 | 10 | 25 | 9 | 2 | 37 | 11 | 10 | 5 | 3^{12F} | 31 | 9 | 18 | 15 | 17 | 2 | 23 | 8 | 35 | 10 | 10 | 20 | 2 | 762 | 90 | 2 |
| 21 | Kyle Busch | 34 | 7 | 5* | 8 | 33 | 21 | 17 | 10 | 14 | 27 | 20 | 21 | 15 | 12 | 8 | 37 | 20 | 21 | 5 | 10 | 11 | 25 | 20 | 22 | 16 | 33 | 8 | 22 | 16 | 30 | 19 | 34 | 8 | 19 | 13 | 5 | 737 | 50 | – |
| 22 | Michael McDowell | 11^{F} | 13 | 11 | 27^{F} | **16** | 20 | 12 | 29 | 30 | 11^{F} | 26 | 23 | 7 | 21 | 30 | 5 | 35 | 18 | 32*^{1} | 4 | 13 | 30 | 27 | 19 | 17 | 12 | 33 | 14 | 17 | 8 | 14 | 5 | 16 | **17**^{F} | 24 | 8 | 734 | 53 | 1 |
| 23 | Carson Hocevar | 30 | 2 | 13 | 36 | 30 | 37 | 19 | 32 | 11 | 6 | **24**^{F} | 26 | 34 | 2 | 29 | 34 | 18 | 10 | 35 | 32 | 35 | 10 | 8 | 18 | 15 | 34 | 9 | 15 | 7 | 11^{F} | 29 | 29 | 32 | 6 | 31 | 28 | 702 | 143 | – |
| 24 | Erik Jones | 12 | 31 | 27 | 18 | 27 | 15 | 38 | 17 | 26 | 18 | 5 | 32 | 13 | 7 | 11 | 17 | 13 | 5 | 25 | 29 | 27 | 36 | 16 | 12 | 26 | 5 | 3 | 21 | 20 | 28 | 16 | 30 | 15 | 35 | 34 | 16 | 665 | 61 | – |
| 25 | John Hunter Nemechek | 5 | 10 | 22 | 14 | 20 | 23 | 25 | 30 | 21 | 30 | 8 | 10 | 27 | 27 | 34 | 6 | 6 | 26^{F} | 15 | 28 | 21 | 12 | 15 | 32 | 36 | 17 | 4 | 6 | 14 | 34 | 32 | 26 | 29 | 14 | 21 | 31 | 664 | 61 | – |
| 26 | A. J. Allmendinger | 41 | 14^{F} | 30 | 22 | 8 | 7 | 23 | 18 | 9^{F} | 24 | 36 | 38 | 4 | 20 | 17 | 13 | 21 | 12 | 6 | 18 | 37 | 23 | 18 | 11 | 22 | 26^{F} | 5 | 23 | **36**^{F} | 20 | 36 | 9 | 19 | 37 | 28 | 38 | 649 | 70 | – |
| 27 | Todd Gilliland | 27 | 15 | 10 | 17 | 29 | 30 | 10 | 14 | 35 | 16 | 11 | 12 | 18 | 22 | 33 | 22 | 28 | 27 | 38 | 22 | 25 | 6 | 34 | 28 | 25 | 11 | 26 | 32 | 24 | 19 | 12 | 17 | 21 | 2 | 9 | 22 | 616 | 38 | – |
| 28 | Zane Smith | 36 | 11 | 29 | 9 | 23 | 11 | 16 | 12 | 27 | **19** | 17 | 16 | 39 | 13 | 7 | 35 | 25 | 7 | 14 | 27 | 22 | 31 | 36 | 17 | 11 | 31 | 13 | 33 | 3 | 27 | 31 | 24 | 24 | 9 | 25 | 29 | 615 | 35 | – |
| 29 | Daniel Suárez | 13 | 33 | 36 | 23 | 2 | 22 | 21 | 15 | 33 | 9 | 10 | 34 | 36 | 16 | 14 | 19 | 15 | 34 | 29 | 14 | 26 | 27 | 25 | 7 | 7 | 2 | 25 | 35 | 37 | 36 | 17 | 7 | 20 | 12 | 22 | 19 | 611 | 30 | – |
| 30 | Ricky Stenhouse Jr. | 18 | 5 | 18 | 21 | 18 | 24 | 20 | 25 | 22 | 12 | 6 | 19 | 11 | 39 | 20 | 27 | 30 | 6 | 31 | 33 | 23 | 35 | 33 | 23 | 23 | 35 | 30 | 20 | 22 | 25 | 35 | 19 | 14 | 38 | 27 | 17 | 562 | 52 | – |
| 31 | Justin Haley | 19 | 24 | 16 | 34 | 14 | 10 | 28 | 24 | 13 | 25 | 15 | 31 | 30 | 32 | 21 | 24 | 19 | 23 | 22 | 15^{F} | 17 | 11 | 23 | 27 | 37 | 3 | 27 | 28 | 13 | 33 | 18 | 25 | 27 | 39 | 19 | 14 | 559 | 20 | – |
| 32 | Cole Custer | 21 | 36 | 23 | 32 | 26 | 28 | 33 | 22 | 29 | 13 | 19 | 25 | 21 | 19 | 35 | 8 | 22 | 19 | 33 | 23 | 29 | 20 | 26 | 34 | 24 | 4 | 24 | 27 | 33 | 24 | 20 | 22 | 28 | 5 | 17 | 25 | 486 | 3 | – |
| 33 | Ty Dillon | 14 | 29 | 28 | 16 | 21 | 27 | 15 | 16 | 32 | 23 | 12 | 35 | 19 | 26 | 24 | 33 | 33 | 8 | 20 | 17 | 20 | 28 | 35 | 30 | 20 | 22 | 34 | 34 | 27 | 29 | 13 | 27 | 37 | 20 | 26 | 35 | 477 | 29 | – |
| 34 | Noah Gragson | 28 | 34 | 8 | 26 | 31 | 16 | 29 | 19 | 23 | 4 | 34 | 14 | 10 | 38 | 27 | 30 | 23 | 25 | 30 | 37 | 31 | 33 | 29 | 21 | 27 | 38 | 14 | 30 | 23 | 16 | 23 | 28 | 13 | 36 | 30 | 27 | 440 | 9 | – |
| 35 | Riley Herbst **(R)** | 17 | 17 | 17 | 37 | 19 | 33 | 31 | 34 | 28 | 22 | 14 | 27 | 28 | 24 | 25 | 29 | 37 | 28 | 17 | 25 | 24 | 26 | 30 | 24 | 31 | 40 | 28 | 31 | 18 | 22 | 22 | 37 | 17 | 32 | 36 | 23 | 399 | 10 | – |
| 36 | Cody Ware | 25 | 35 | 31 | 24 | 36 | 34 | 30 | 27 | 36 | 31 | 30 | 30 | 25 | 33 | 26 | 31 | 29 | 13 | 26 | 34 | 36 | 37 | 32 | 29 | 32 | 20 | 37 | 29 | 29 | 31 | 37 | 33 | 35 | 31 | 32 | 30 | 233 | 4 | – |
| 37 | Katherine Legge | | | | 30 | | | | | | | | | | | | 32 | | | 19 | 31 | | 17 | | 36 | | | | | | | | | 31 | | | | 63 | – | – |
| 38 | Jimmie Johnson | 3 | | | | | | | | | | | | 40 | | | | | | | | | | | | | | | | | | | | | | | | 35 | – | – |
| 39 | Derek Kraus | | | | | | | | | | | | | 32 | | | | | | | | | | | | | | 36 | | | | | | | | | | 6 | – | – |
| 40 | Chad Finchum | | | | | | | | | | | 37 | | | 35 | | | | | | | | | | | | | | | 35 | | | | | | | | 5 | – | – |
| 41 | Burt Myers | | | | | | | 36 | | | | | | | | | | | | | | | | | | | | | | | | | | | | | | 1 | – | – |
| 42 | Martin Truex Jr. | 38 | | | | | | | | | | | | | | | | | | | | | | | | | | | | | | | | | | | | 1 | – | – |
| 43 | Will Brown | | | | | | | | | | | | | | | | | | | 39 | | | | | | | | | | | | | | | | | | 1 | – | – |
Ineligible for driver points
| Pos. | Driver | DAY | ATL | COA | PHO | LVS | HOM | MAR | DAR | BRI | TAL | TEX | KAN | CLT | NSS | MCH | MXC | POC | ATL | CSC | SON | DOV | IND | IOW | GLN | RCH | DAY | DAR | GTW | BRI | NHA | KAN | ROV | LVS | TAL | MAR | PHO | Pts. | Stage | Bonus |
| | Corey Heim | | | | | | | | | | | | 13 | | 37 | | | | | DNQ | | | | | | 29 | | | | 6 | | | | | | | | | | |
| | Austin Hill | | | | | | | | 31 | | | | | | | | | | | 9 | | | | | | | 30 | | | 25 | | | | | 22 | | | | | |
| | Justin Allgaier | 9 | | | | | | | | | | | | | | | | | | | | | | | | | | | | | | | | | | | | | | |
| | Connor Zilisch | | | 37 | | | | | | | | | | 23 | | | | | 11 | | | | | | Wth | | | | | | | | | | | | | | | |
| | B. J. McLeod | DNQ | 22 | | | | | | | | 33 | | | | | | | | 16 | | | | | | | | 32 | | | | | | | | 28 | | | | | |
| | Casey Mears | | | | | | | 35 | | | | | | | | | | | | | | | | | | | 29 | | | | | | | | 18 | 33 | 36 | | | |
| | Josh Bilicki | | | | | | | | | 39 | | | | 33 | | | | | | 21 | | | 34 | | 37 | | | | | | | | 32 | | | | | | | |
| | Anthony Alfredo | DNQ | | | | | | | | | 28 | | | | | | | | | | | | | | | | | | | | | | | | 21 | | | | | |
| | Corey LaJoie | 22 | 38 | | | | | | | 34 | | | | | | | | | 39 | | | | | | | | | | | | | | | | | | | | | |
| | Ryan Truex | | | | | | | | | | | | | | | | 23 | | | | | | | | | | | | | | | | | | | | | | | |
| | Jesse Love | | | | | | | | | 31 | | 31 | 29 | | | | | | | | | | 24 | | | 33 | | | | | | | | | | | | | | |
| | Joey Gase | | | | | | | | | | | | | | | | | | | | | | | 37 | | | 28 | | | | | | | | | | | | | |
| | David Starr | | | | | | | | | | | | | | | | | | 29 | | | | | | | | | | | | | | | | | | | | | |
| | J. J. Yeley | DNQ | 37 | | | | 35 | | 38 | | 32 | | | | 34 | | | | | | | 34 | | | 38 | | | | | | | 34 | | 30 | | | 32 | | | |
| | Brennan Poole | | | | | | | | | | | | | | | | | 34 | | | | | | | | | | | | | | | | | | | | | | |
| | Timmy Hill | | | | | | | | | | | | | | | | | | | | | | | | | | | 35 | | | | | | | | | | | | |
| | Hélio Castroneves | 39^{†} | | | | | | | | | | | | | | | | | | | | | | | | | | | | | | | | | | | | | | |
| | Chandler Smith | DNQ | | | | | | | | | | | | | | | | | | | | | | | | | | | | | | | | | | | | | | |
| Pos. | Driver | DAY | ATL | COA | PHO | LVS | HOM | MAR | DAR | BRI | TAL | TEX | KAN | CLT | NSS | MCH | MXC | POC | ATL | CSC | SON | DOV | IND | IOW | GLN | RCH | DAY | DAR | GTW | BRI | NHA | KAN | ROV | LVS | TAL | MAR | PHO | Pts. | Stage | Bonus |
^{†} – Castroneves made the race on the Open Exemption Provisional, and the No. 91 entry did not receive owners points.

=== Manufacturers' championship ===
| Pos | Manufacturer | Wins | Points |
|---|---|---|---|
| 1 | Chevrolet | 15 | 1310 |
| 2 | Toyota | 14 | 1281 |
| 3 | Ford | 7 | 1210 |

== See also ==
- 2025 NASCAR Xfinity Series
- 2025 NASCAR Craftsman Truck Series
- 2025 ARCA Menards Series
- 2025 ARCA Menards Series East
- 2025 ARCA Menards Series West
- 2025 NASCAR Whelen Modified Tour
- 2025 NASCAR Canada Series
- 2025 NASCAR Mexico Series
- 2025 NASCAR Euro Series
- 2025 NASCAR Brasil Series
- 2025 CARS Tour
- 2025 SMART Modified Tour
