= NASCAR Cup Series at Mexico City =

NASCAR Cup Series race at Autodromo Hermanos Rodriguez

Viva México 250

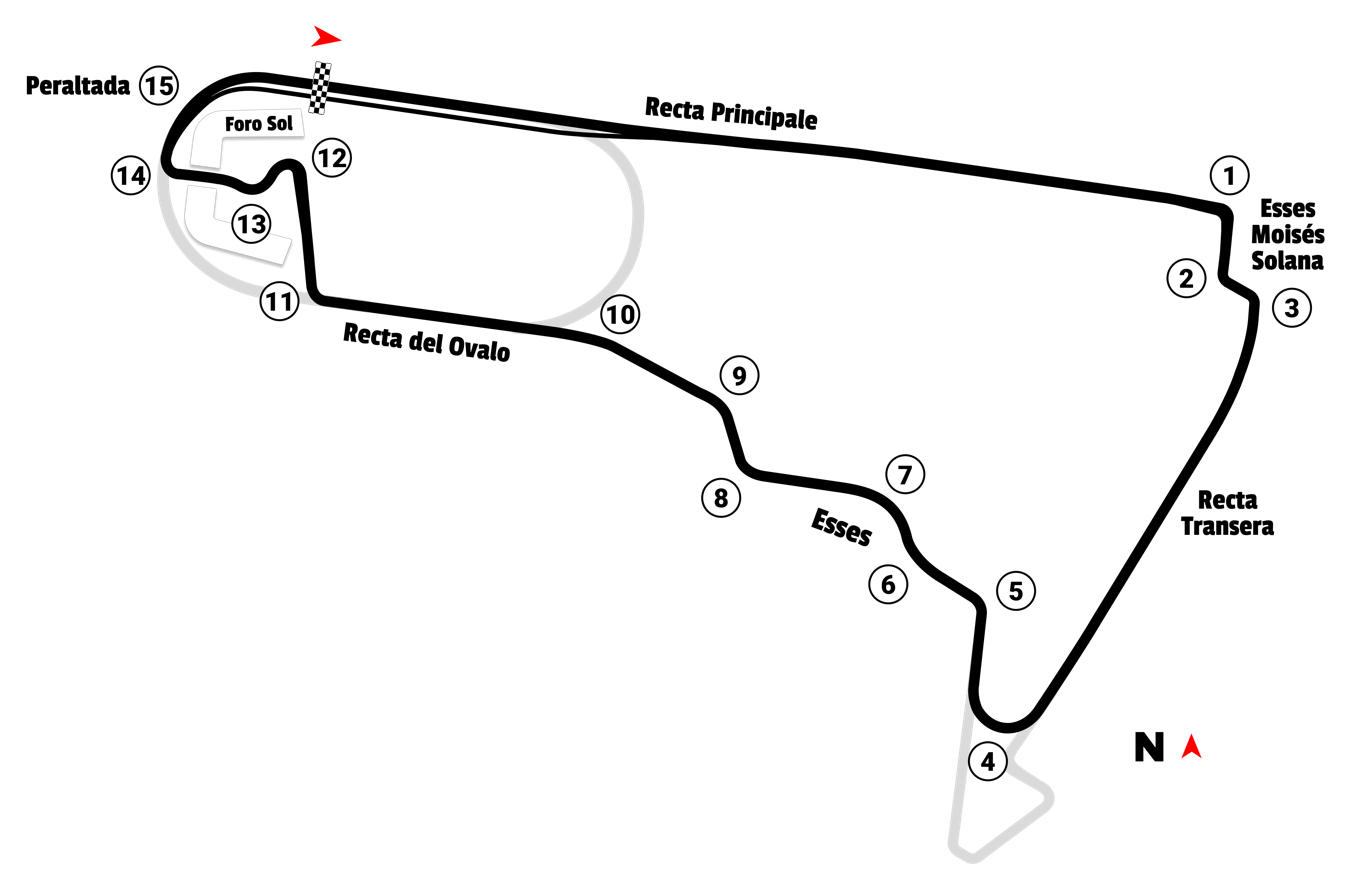

NASCAR Cup Series
- Venue: Autódromo Hermanos Rodríguez
- Location: Mexico City, Mexico
- First race: 2025
- Last race: 2025
- Distance: 242.9 miles (390.910 km)
- Laps: 100; Stage 1: 20; Stage 2: 25; Final Stage: 55
- Most wins (driver): Shane van Gisbergen (1)
- Most wins (team): Trackhouse Racing (1)
- Most wins (manufacturer): Chevrolet (1)

Circuit information
- Surface: Asphalt
- Length: 2.429 mi (3.909 km)
- Turns: 15

The Viva México 250 was a NASCAR Cup Series stock car race held at the Autódromo Hermanos Rodríguez in Mexico City, Mexico.

== History ==
After attempts to host a Cup Series race at the Circuit Gilles Villeneuve failed, NASCAR worked with Autódromo Hermanos Rodríguez officials to host a Cup Series race in Mexico. On August 27, 2024, it was officially announced to be held on June 15, 2025, becoming the first points paying Cup Series race to be held outside the United States since 1958. Shane van Gisbergen was the winner of the event.

On July 30, 2025, The Athletic reported that NASCAR would not return to Mexico City in 2026, citing the scheduling challenge as Mexico City serving as a host city for the 2026 FIFA World Cup. The Athletic also reported that NASCAR attempted to find a different date in the 2026 schedule, but eventually decided to focus on finding the event a date on the 2027 schedule. A replacement race at the Coronado Street Course was held instead in 2026.

== Past winners ==
| Year | Date | No. | Driver | Team | Manufacturer | Race Distance | | Race Time | Average Speed (mph) | Report | Ref |
| Year | Date | No. | Driver | Team | Manufacturer | Laps | Miles (km) | Race Time | Average Speed (mph) | Report | Ref |
|---|---|---|---|---|---|---|---|---|---|---|---|
| 2025 | June 15 | 88 | Shane van Gisbergen | Trackhouse Racing | Chevrolet | 100 | 242 (389.461) | 3:14:04 | 74.82 | Report | |

== See also ==
- The Chilango 150
