= NASCAR Cup Series at Circuit of the Americas =

NASCAR Cup Series race at Circuit of the Americas

DuraMAX Texas Grand Prix Powered by RelaDyne

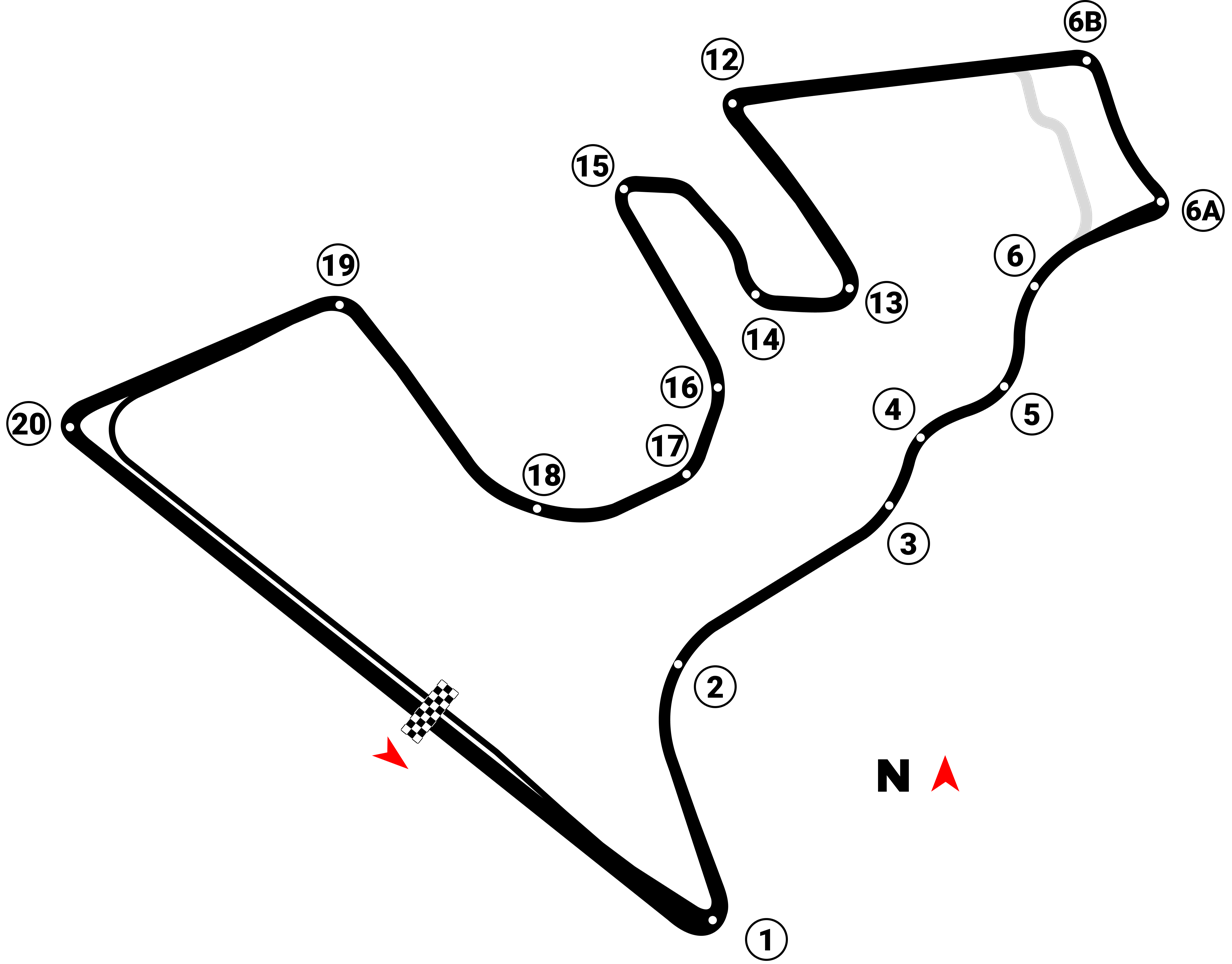

NASCAR Cup Series
- Venue: Circuit of the Americas
- Location: Austin, Texas
- Corporate sponsor: DuraMAX
- First race: 2021
- Laps: 95; Stage 1: 20; Stage 2: 45; Final Stage: 30
- Previous names: EchoPark Texas Grand Prix (2021–2022); EchoPark Automotive Grand Prix (2023–2025)
- Most wins (driver): Tyler Reddick
- Most wins (team): Hendrick Motorsports; 23XI Racing (2)
- Most wins (manufacturer): Chevrolet, Toyota (3)

Circuit information
- Surface: Asphalt
- Length: 2.400 mi (3.862 km)
- Turns: 18

The DuraMAX Texas Grand Prix Powered by RelaDyne is a NASCAR Cup Series stock car race at Circuit of the Americas in Austin, Texas. Introduced in 2021, the race was one of seven road course dates on the Cup Series schedule that year. Tyler Reddick is the defending winner.

There is also a NASCAR O'Reilly Auto Parts Series race, the Focused Health 250, that is held on the same weekend as the Cup Series.

== History ==
The configuration of the Grand Prix Circuit, used from 2021 to 2024.

Circuit of the Americas, a 3.426 mi (5.514 km) road course in Austin, opened in 2012 with major events being Formula One's United States Grand Prix and MotoGP's Motorcycle Grand Prix of the Americas. For its prestige, the track was subject to calls from fans to be added to the NASCAR calendar, but a primary obstacle was the need for other speedways to give up their races which were protected by sanctioning contracts. Texas Motor Speedway, an oval track located three hours away in Fort Worth that regularly hosted two Cup Series races, was a large opponent as it maintained an agreement with NASCAR that prevented the sanctioning body from adding races in the region. TMS president Eddie Gossage also clashed with COTA and F1 in 2014 and 2018 when the latter scheduled the USGP for the same weekend as NASCAR's November races at Texas, a matter that Gossage said in 2014 was "a shot fired by Formula One at NASCAR." Gossage had also lowered the sanctioning fee for the IndyCar Series' race at Texas in order for the series to race at COTA.

In 2017, COTA president Bobby Epstein told the Austin American-Statesman he had been in contact with NASCAR officials and that "everyone seems to want to be here, so I see no reason why it couldn't come together." Gossage ridiculed the news, rebutting in the Fort Worth Star-Telegram that he "just laughed at it" as "anyone can talk to a NASCAR official."

Although NASCAR did not race at the track in the 2010s, demonstrations involving NASCAR drivers took place during the decade. In 2013, to promote the V8 Supercars' Austin 400 at the track, Kurt Busch participated in a seat swap with Supercar champion James Courtney, with Busch driving Courtney's Holden Racing Team Supercar and Courtney in Busch's Furniture Row Racing Chevrolet SS. Six years later, Tony Stewart drove a two-seat version of his Stewart–Haas Racing Ford Mustang around the circuit with Haas F1 Team drivers Romain Grosjean and Kevin Magnussen riding. Stewart compared COTA to NASCAR road course Watkins Glen International due to its "very, very technical" nature, and rebuked skepticism about stock car overtaking opportunities by noting there were "five and potentially six passing zones on that race track for Cup cars." Although he added excluding COTA as a potential NASCAR host track would be an "injustice", Stewart also argued the "worst thing [NASCAR] could ever do is take one of the races from Texas Motor Speedway."

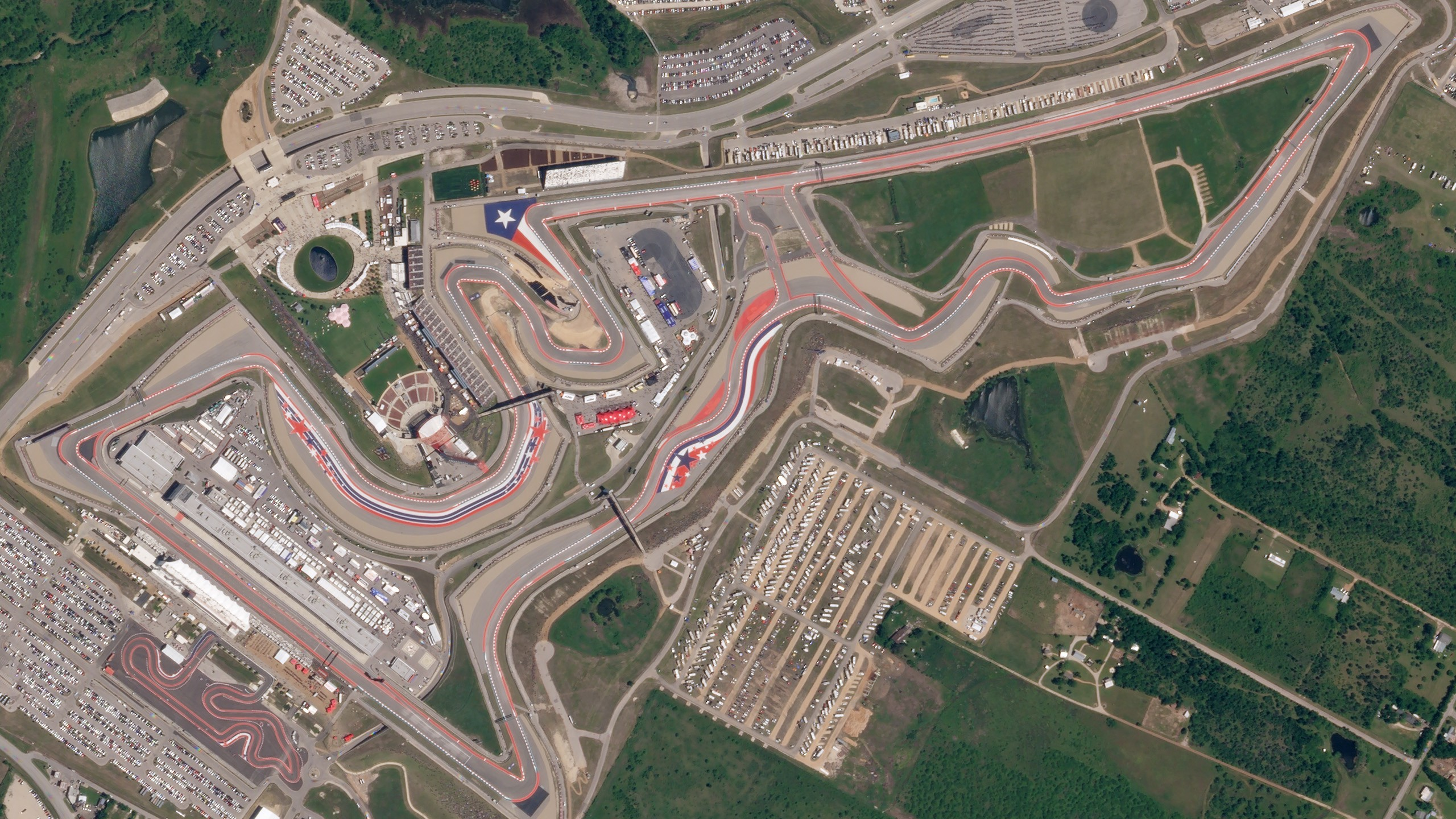
Aerial view of COTA

On September 30, 2020, NASCAR revealed the 2021 Cup Series schedule with a COTA race planned for May 23. The Xfinity and Camping World Truck Series, along with the International Motor Sports Association's Lamborghini Super Trofeo North America sports car series, joined the weekend as support races; the Truck race was part of the Triple Truck Challenge. The race replaced the spring event at Texas, which became the NASCAR All-Star Race. Speedway Motorsports, which operates TMS, assumed organizational responsibilities of the COTA race while company liaison Bryan Hammond was named race executive director in November.

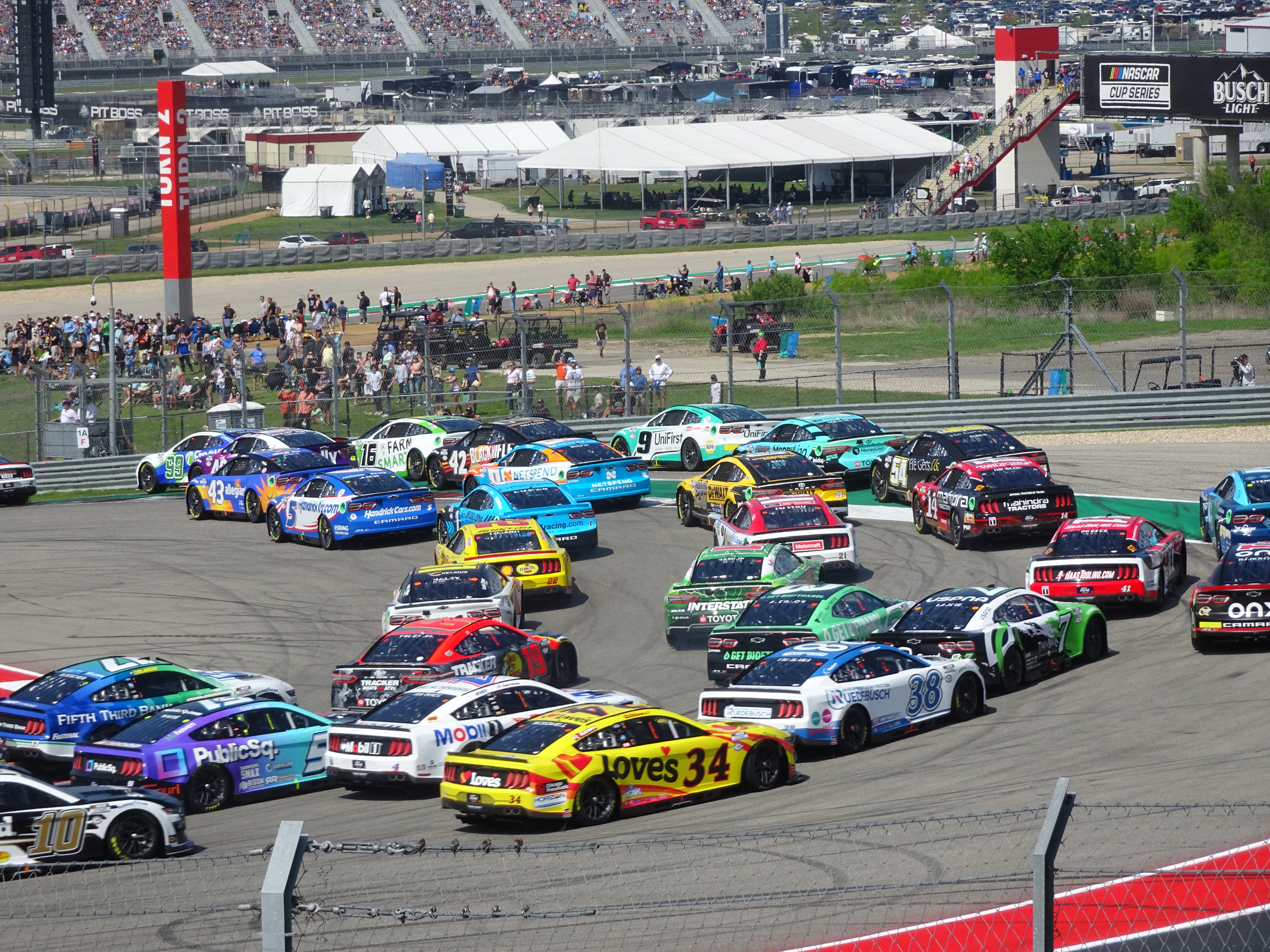
Cars making their way through Turn 1 in the 2023 race

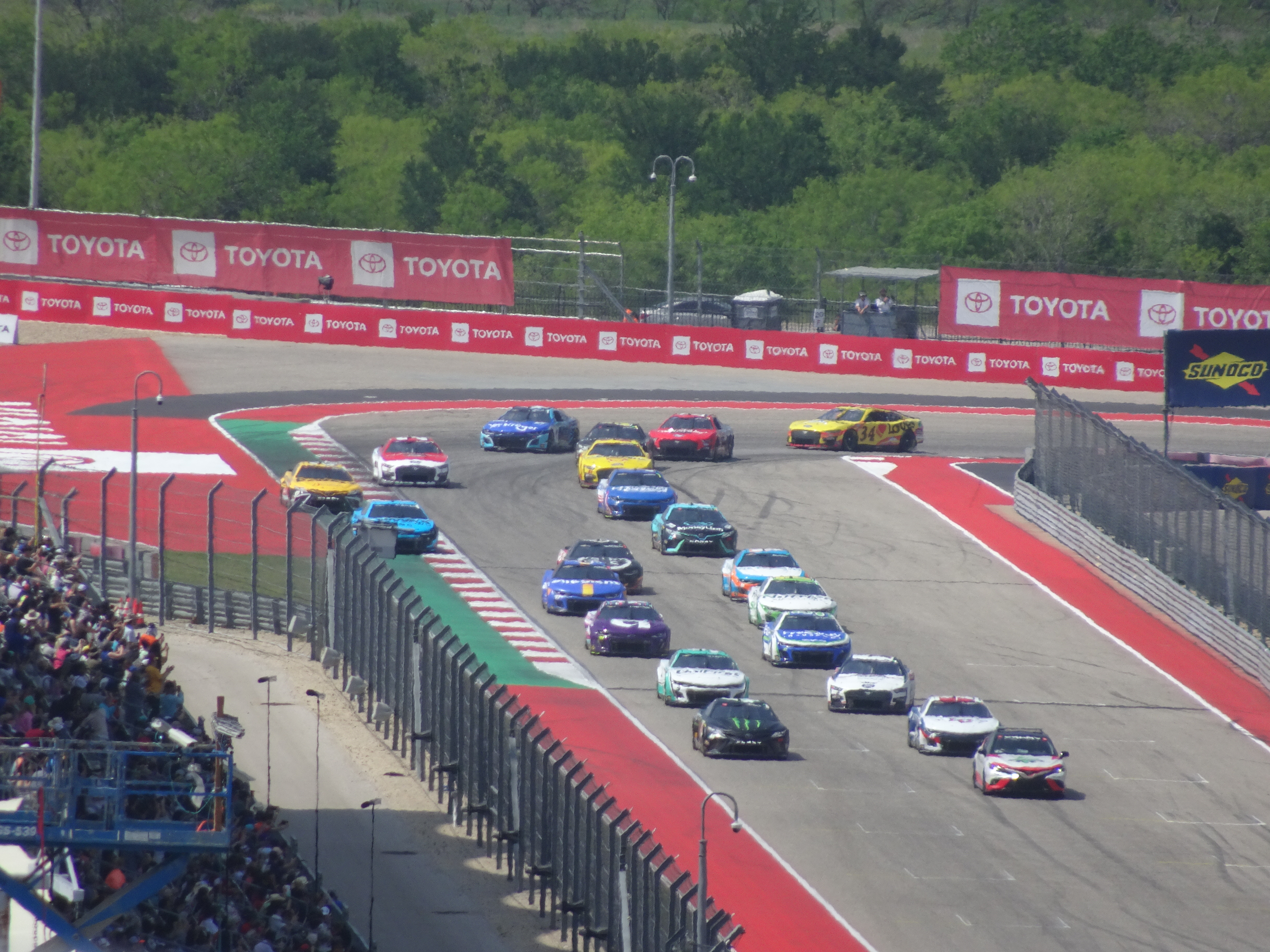
Cars going through Turn 20 into the frontstretch during a Stage 1 caution in the 2023 race

Although the shortened, 2.400 mi (3.862 km) layout was considered, NASCAR announced on December 11 that the weekend's races would utilize the full, 3.426 mi (5.514 km) course. To accommodate stock cars, safety changes to the track included placing tire barriers, extending the pit wall, adding caution lights, and installing curbs and rumble strips.

On February 25, 2021, Speedway Motorsports announced EchoPark Automotive would assume naming rights for the race, branding it the EchoPark Texas Grand Prix.

Chase Elliott won the inaugural EchoPark Texas Grand Prix. The race was shortened to 54 laps due to heavy rain. This would give Hendrick Motorsports their 268th win tying Petty Enterprises and Chevrolet their 800th victory in NASCAR.

On November 20, 2024, it was announced that both the Cup and Xfinity Series races would move to the 2.400 mi (3.862 km) layout starting in 2025.

On January 8, 2026, DuraMAX was announced of the title sponsor for the race.

== Past winners ==
Year	Date	No.	Driver	Team	Manufacturer	Race distance		Race time	Average speed (mph)	Report	Ref
Year	Date	No.	Driver	Team	Manufacturer	Laps	Miles (km)	Race time	Average speed (mph)	Report	Ref
Grand Prix Layout: 3.426 miles (5.514 km.)
2021	May 23	9	Chase Elliott	Hendrick Motorsports	Chevrolet	54*	185 (298)	3:07:11	59.024	Report	
2022	March 27	1	Ross Chastain	Trackhouse Racing	Chevrolet	69*	236.394 (380.686)	3:20:57	70.253	Report	
2023	March 26	45	Tyler Reddick	23XI Racing	Toyota	75*	255.75 (411.856)	3:30:32	72.886	Report	
2024	March 24	24	William Byron	Hendrick Motorsports	Chevrolet	68	232.968 (374.926)	2:43:15	85.224	Report	
NASCAR Layout: 2.400 miles (3.862 km.)
2025	March 2	20	Christopher Bell	Joe Gibbs Racing	Toyota	95	232.968 (374.926)	3:07:20	73.025	Report	
2026	March 1	45	Tyler Reddick	23XI Racing	Toyota	95	232.968 (374.926)	2:58:53	76.474	Report	
2027	March 7									Report	

=== Notes ===
- 2021: Race shortened due to heavy rain.
- 2022 & 2023: Race extended due to a NASCAR Overtime finish.

=== Multiple winners (drivers) ===
# Wins	Driver	Years won
2	Tyler Reddick	2023, 2026

=== Multiple winners (teams) ===
# Wins	Team	Years won
2	Hendrick Motorsports	2021, 2024
2	23XI Racing	2023, 2026

=== Manufacturer wins ===
# Wins	Manufacturer	Years won
3	(United States) Chevrolet	2021, 2022, 2024
3	(Japan) Toyota	2023, 2025, 2026

Previous race: Autotrader 400	NASCAR Cup Series; DuraMAX Texas Grand Prix	Next race: Straight Talk Wireless 500
