= 2025 Mobil 1 301 =

Race details
- Race 30 of 36 in the 2025 NASCAR Cup Series
- Date: September 21, 2025
- Location: New Hampshire Motor Speedway in Loudon, New Hampshire
- Course: Permanent racing facility
- Course length: 1.058 miles (1.703 km)
- Distance: 301 laps, 318.458 mi (512.508 km)
- Average speed: 101.699 miles per hour (163.669 km/h)

Pole position
Driver	Joey Logano	Team Penske
- Time: 29.159

Most laps led
Driver	Joey Logano	Team Penske
- Laps: 147

Fastest lap
Driver	Carson Hocevar	Spire Motorsports
- Time: 29.923

Winner
No. 12	Ryan Blaney	Team Penske

Television in the United States
- Network: USA
- Announcers: Leigh Diffey, Jeff Burton and Steve Letarte
- Nielsen ratings: 0.70 (1.29 million)

Radio in the United States
- Radio: PRN
- Booth announcers: Brad Gillie and Mark Garrow
- Turn announcers: Rob Albright (1 & 2) and Pat Patterson (3 & 4)

The 2025 Mobil 1 301 was a NASCAR Cup Series race held on September 21, 2025, at New Hampshire Motor Speedway in Loudon, New Hampshire on the 1.058-mile (1.703 km) speedway. It was the 30th race of the 2025 NASCAR Cup Series season, and the fourth race of the playoffs, and the first race in the Round of 12.

Ryan Blaney won the race. Josh Berry finished 2nd, and William Byron finished 3rd. Joey Logano and Chase Elliott rounded out the top five, and Christopher Bell, Kyle Larson, Michael McDowell, Ross Chastain, and Chase Briscoe rounded out the top ten.

== Report ==
=== Background ===
New Hampshire Motor Speedway, the track where the race was held.

New Hampshire Motor Speedway is a 1.058-mile (1.703 km) oval speedway located in Loudon, New Hampshire, which has hosted NASCAR racing annually since the early 1990s, as well as the longest-running motorcycle race in North America, the Loudon Classic. Nicknamed "The Magic Mile", the speedway is often converted into a 1.6-mile (2.6 km) road course, which includes much of the oval.

The track was originally the site of Bryar Motorsports Park before being purchased and redeveloped by Bob Bahre. The track is currently one of eight major NASCAR tracks owned and operated by Speedway Motorsports.

==== Entry list ====
- (R) denotes rookie driver.
- (P) denotes playoff driver.
- (i) denotes driver who is ineligible for series driver points.

No.	Driver	Team	Manufacturer
1	Ross Chastain (P)	Trackhouse Racing	Chevrolet
2	Austin Cindric (P)	Team Penske	Ford
3	Austin Dillon	Richard Childress Racing	Chevrolet
4	Noah Gragson	Front Row Motorsports	Ford
5	Kyle Larson (P)	Hendrick Motorsports	Chevrolet
6	Brad Keselowski	RFK Racing	Ford
7	Justin Haley	Spire Motorsports	Chevrolet
8	Kyle Busch	Richard Childress Racing	Chevrolet
9	Chase Elliott (P)	Hendrick Motorsports	Chevrolet
10	Ty Dillon	Kaulig Racing	Chevrolet
11	Denny Hamlin (P)	Joe Gibbs Racing	Toyota
12	Ryan Blaney (P)	Team Penske	Ford
16	A. J. Allmendinger	Kaulig Racing	Chevrolet
17	Chris Buescher	RFK Racing	Ford
19	Chase Briscoe (P)	Joe Gibbs Racing	Toyota
20	Christopher Bell (P)	Joe Gibbs Racing	Toyota
21	Josh Berry	Wood Brothers Racing	Ford
22	Joey Logano (P)	Team Penske	Ford
23	Bubba Wallace (P)	23XI Racing	Toyota
24	William Byron (P)	Hendrick Motorsports	Chevrolet
34	Todd Gilliland	Front Row Motorsports	Ford
35	Riley Herbst (R)	23XI Racing	Toyota
38	Zane Smith	Front Row Motorsports	Ford
41	Cole Custer	Haas Factory Team	Ford
42	John Hunter Nemechek	Legacy Motor Club	Toyota
43	Erik Jones	Legacy Motor Club	Toyota
45	Tyler Reddick (P)	23XI Racing	Toyota
47	Ricky Stenhouse Jr.	Hyak Motorsports	Chevrolet
48	Alex Bowman	Hendrick Motorsports	Chevrolet
51	Cody Ware	Rick Ware Racing	Ford
54	Ty Gibbs	Joe Gibbs Racing	Toyota
60	Ryan Preece	RFK Racing	Ford
71	Michael McDowell	Spire Motorsports	Chevrolet
77	Carson Hocevar	Spire Motorsports	Chevrolet
88	Shane van Gisbergen (R)	Trackhouse Racing	Chevrolet
99	Daniel Suárez	Trackhouse Racing	Chevrolet
Official entry list

== Practice ==
William Byron was the fastest in the practice session with a time of 29.795 seconds and a speed of 127.834 mph (205.729 km/h).

=== Practice results ===
Pos	No.	Driver	Team	Manufacturer	Time	Speed
1	24	William Byron (P)	Hendrick Motorsports	Chevrolet	29.795	127.834
2	16	A. J. Allmendinger	Kaulig Racing	Chevrolet	29.839	127.645
3	60	Ryan Preece	RFK Racing	Ford	29.877	127.483
Official practice results

== Qualifying ==
Joey Logano scored the pole for the race with a time of 29.159 and a speed of 130.622 mph (210.216 km/h).

=== Qualifying results ===
Pos	No.	Driver	Team	Manufacturer	Time	Speed
1	22	Joey Logano (P)	Team Penske	Ford	29.159	130.622
2	12	Ryan Blaney (P)	Team Penske	Ford	29.329	129.865
3	21	Josh Berry	Wood Brothers Racing	Ford	29.354	129.754
4	45	Tyler Reddick (P)	23XI Racing	Toyota	29.356	129.745
5	24	William Byron (P)	Hendrick Motorsports	Chevrolet	29.373	129.670
6	77	Carson Hocevar	Spire Motorsports	Chevrolet	29.398	129.560
7	48	Alex Bowman	Hendrick Motorsports	Chevrolet	29.402	129.542
8	1	Ross Chastain (P)	Trackhouse Racing	Chevrolet	29.405	129.529
9	11	Denny Hamlin (P)	Joe Gibbs Racing	Toyota	29.409	129.522
10	88	Shane van Gisbergen (R)	Trackhouse Racing	Chevrolet	29.409	129.522
11	71	Michael McDowell	Spire Motorsports	Chevrolet	29.424	129.445
12	16	A. J. Allmendinger	Kaulig Racing	Chevrolet	29.467	129.256
13	54	Ty Gibbs	Joe Gibbs Racing	Toyota	29.477	129.213
14	23	Bubba Wallace (P)	23XI Racing	Toyota	29.485	129.178
15	17	Chris Buescher	RFK Racing	Ford	29.488	129.164
16	5	Kyle Larson (P)	Hendrick Motorsports	Chevrolet	29.496	129.129
17	6	Brad Keselowski	RFK Racing	Ford	29.500	129.112
18	19	Chase Briscoe (P)	Joe Gibbs Racing	Toyota	29.511	129.064
19	20	Christopher Bell (P)	Joe Gibbs Racing	Toyota	29.527	128.994
20	38	Zane Smith	Front Row Motorsports	Ford	29.547	128.906
21	7	Justin Haley	Spire Motorsports	Chevrolet	29.559	128.854
22	2	Austin Cindric (P)	Team Penske	Ford	29.592	128.710
23	60	Ryan Preece	RFK Racing	Ford	29.601	128.671
24	8	Kyle Busch	Richard Childress Racing	Chevrolet	29.614	128.615
25	35	Riley Herbst (R)	23XI Racing	Toyota	29.620	128.589
26	43	Erik Jones	Legacy Motor Club	Toyota	29.632	128.537
27	9	Chase Elliott (P)	Hendrick Motorsports	Chevrolet	29.659	128.420
28	3	Austin Dillon	Richard Childress Racing	Chevrolet	29.681	128.325
29	42	John Hunter Nemechek	Legacy Motor Club	Toyota	29.756	128.001
30	10	Ty Dillon	Kaulig Racing	Chevrolet	29.760	127.984
31	41	Cole Custer	Haas Factory Team	Ford	29.773	127.928
32	99	Daniel Suárez	Trackhouse Racing	Chevrolet	29.788	127.864
33	4	Noah Gragson	Front Row Motorsports	Ford	29.940	127.214
34	47	Ricky Stenhouse Jr.	Hyak Motorsports	Chevrolet	29.995	126.981
35	51	Cody Ware	Rick Ware Racing	Ford	30.123	126.442
36	34	Todd Gilliland	Front Row Motorsports	Ford	30.254	125.894
Official qualifying results

== Race ==
=== Race results ===
==== Stage results ====
Stage One Laps: 70

Pos	No	Driver	Team	Manufacturer	Points
1	12	Ryan Blaney (P)	Team Penske	Ford	10
2	22	Joey Logano (P)	Team Penske	Ford	9
3	24	William Byron (P)	Hendrick Motorsports	Chevrolet	8
4	21	Josh Berry	Wood Brothers Racing	Ford	7
5	77	Carson Hocevar	Spire Motorsports	Chevrolet	6
6	5	Kyle Larson (P)	Hendrick Motorsports	Chevrolet	5
7	88	Shane van Gisbergen (R)	Trackhouse Racing	Chevrolet	4
8	48	Alex Bowman	Hendrick Motorsports	Chevrolet	3
9	45	Tyler Reddick (P)	23XI Racing	Toyota	2
10	71	Michael McDowell	Spire Motorsports	Chevrolet	1
Official stage one results

Stage Two Laps: 115

Pos	No	Driver	Team	Manufacturer	Points
1	22	Joey Logano (P)	Team Penske	Ford	10
2	5	Kyle Larson (P)	Hendrick Motorsports	Chevrolet	9
3	24	William Byron (P)	Hendrick Motorsports	Chevrolet	8
4	12	Ryan Blaney (P)	Team Penske	Ford	7
5	77	Carson Hocevar	Spire Motorsports	Chevrolet	6
6	20	Christopher Bell (P)	Joe Gibbs Racing	Toyota	5
7	9	Chase Elliott (P)	Hendrick Motorsports	Chevrolet	4
8	11	Denny Hamlin (P)	Joe Gibbs Racing	Toyota	3
9	19	Chase Briscoe (P)	Joe Gibbs Racing	Toyota	2
10	21	Josh Berry	Wood Brothers Racing	Ford	1
Official stage two results

=== Final Stage results ===
Stage Three Laps: 116

Pos	Grid	No	Driver	Team	Manufacturer	Laps	Points
1	2	12	Ryan Blaney (P)	Team Penske	Ford	301	57
2	3	21	Josh Berry	Wood Brothers Racing	Ford	301	43
3	5	24	William Byron (P)	Hendrick Motorsports	Chevrolet	301	50
4	1	22	Joey Logano (P)	Team Penske	Ford	301	52
5	27	9	Chase Elliott (P)	Hendrick Motorsports	Chevrolet	301	36
6	19	20	Christopher Bell (P)	Joe Gibbs Racing	Toyota	301	36
7	16	5	Kyle Larson (P)	Hendrick Motorsports	Chevrolet	301	44
8	11	71	Michael McDowell	Spire Motorsports	Chevrolet	301	30
9	8	1	Ross Chastain (P)	Trackhouse Racing	Chevrolet	301	28
10	18	19	Chase Briscoe (P)	Joe Gibbs Racing	Toyota	301	29
11	6	77	Carson Hocevar	Spire Motorsports	Chevrolet	301	39
12	9	11	Denny Hamlin (P)	Joe Gibbs Racing	Toyota	301	28
13	28	3	Austin Dillon	Richard Childress Racing	Chevrolet	301	24
14	23	60	Ryan Preece	RFK Racing	Ford	301	23
15	7	48	Alex Bowman	Hendrick Motorsports	Chevrolet	301	25
16	33	4	Noah Gragson	Front Row Motorsports	Ford	301	21
17	22	2	Austin Cindric (P)	Team Penske	Ford	301	20
18	15	17	Chris Buescher	RFK Racing	Ford	301	19
19	36	34	Todd Gilliland	Front Row Motorsports	Ford	301	18
20	12	16	A. J. Allmendinger	Kaulig Racing	Chevrolet	301	17
21	4	45	Tyler Reddick (P)	23XI Racing	Toyota	301	18
22	25	35	Riley Herbst (R)	23XI Racing	Toyota	301	15
23	17	6	Brad Keselowski	RFK Racing	Ford	301	14
24	31	41	Cole Custer	Haas Factory Team	Ford	301	13
25	34	47	Ricky Stenhouse Jr.	Hyak Motorsports	Chevrolet	300	12
26	14	23	Bubba Wallace (P)	23XI Racing	Toyota	300	11
27	20	38	Zane Smith	Front Row Motorsports	Ford	300	10
28	26	43	Erik Jones	Legacy Motor Club	Toyota	300	9
29	30	10	Ty Dillon	Kaulig Racing	Chevrolet	300	8
30	24	8	Kyle Busch	Richard Childress Racing	Chevrolet	297	7
31	35	51	Cody Ware	Rick Ware Racing	Ford	296	6
32	10	88	Shane van Gisbergen (R)	Trackhouse Racing	Chevrolet	250	9
33	21	7	Justin Haley	Spire Motorsports	Chevrolet	207	4
34	29	42	John Hunter Nemechek	Legacy Motor Club	Toyota	145	3
35	13	54	Ty Gibbs	Joe Gibbs Racing	Toyota	133	2
36	32	99	Daniel Suárez	Trackhouse Racing	Chevrolet	117	1
Official race results

=== Race statistics ===
- Lead changes: 14 among 7 different drivers
- Cautions/Laps: 8 for 45 laps
- Red flags: 0
- Time of race: 3 hours, 7 minutes and 53 seconds
- Average speed: 101.699 miles per hour (163.669 km/h)

== Media ==
=== Television ===
USA covered the race on the television side. Leigh Diffey, four-time and all-time Loudon winner Jeff Burton and Steve Letarte called the race from the broadcast booth. Kim Coon, Marty Snider and Dillon Welch handled the pit road duties from pit lane.

USA
Booth announcers	Pit reporters
Lap-by-lap: Leigh Diffey; Color-commentator: Jeff Burton; Color-commentator: Steve Letarte	Kim Coon; Marty Snider; Dillon Welch

=== Radio ===
PRN had the radio call for the race, which was also simulcast on Sirius XM NASCAR Radio. Brad Gillie and Mark Garrow called the race from the booth when the field races down the frontstretch. Rob Albright called the race from turns 1 & 2 and Pat Patterson called the race from turns 3 & 4. Brett McMillan, Heather DeBeaux and Alan Cavanna handled the duties on pit lane.

PRN
Booth announcers	Turn announcers	Pit reporters
Lead announcer: Brad Gillie; Announcer: Mark Garrow	Turns 1 & 2: Rob Albright; Turns 3 & 4: Pat Patterson	Brett McMillan; Heather DeBeaux; Alan Cavanna

=== Maps ===
This race happened to be photographed by google maps and the podium celebration can be seen from the air overlooking the speedway.

== Standings after the race ==
Drivers' Championship standings

	Pos	Driver	Points
4	1	Ryan Blaney	3,084
1	2	William Byron	3,082 (–2)
1	3	Kyle Larson	3,076 (–8)
	4	Christopher Bell	3,064 (–20)
4	5	Denny Hamlin	3,062 (–22)
5	6	Joey Logano	3,059 (–25)
	7	Chase Elliott	3,049 (–35)
2	8	Chase Briscoe	3,047 (–37)
1	9	Ross Chastain	3,035 (–49)
1	10	Austin Cindric	3,028 (–56)
1	11	Tyler Reddick	3,024 (–60)
4	12	Bubba Wallace	3,020 (–64)
	13	Alex Bowman	2,081 (–1,003)
	14	Austin Dillon	2,076 (–1,008)
	15	Shane van Gisbergen	2,059 (–1,025)
	16	Josh Berry	2,053 (–1,031)
Official driver's standings

Manufacturers' Championship standings

Pos	Manufacturer	Points
1	Chevrolet	1,090
2	Toyota	1,071 (–19)
3	Ford	1,007 (–83)

- Note: Only the first 16 positions are included for the driver standings.

Previous race: 2025 Bass Pro Shops Night Race	NASCAR Cup Series; 2025 season	Next race: 2025 Hollywood Casino 400
