= Brian Wilson (NASCAR) =

American NASCAR crew chief

- Born: Detroit, Michigan, U.S.
- Occupations: NASCAR crew chief; former race engineer
- Years active: 2004–present
- Employer: Team Penske
- Known for: Crew chief for Austin Cindric; 2020 NASCAR Xfinity Series championship

Brian Wilson is an American NASCAR crew chief who works for Team Penske as the crew chief of the No. 2 Ford driven by Austin Cindric in the NASCAR Cup Series. Wilson previously served as crew chief of Team Penske's No. 22 entry in the NASCAR Xfinity Series and later for the Wood Brothers Racing No. 21 Cup Series team. He joined Team Penske in 2004 and became a crew chief in 2016.

== Early life ==
Wilson is a native of Detroit, Michigan, and is a second-generation race engineer. According to Team Penske, he grew up around racing, began competing in go-karts at age eight, and his father, Steve Wilson, was also a racer and race engineer.

== Career ==
Wilson joined Team Penske in 2004 and worked as a race engineer before becoming a crew chief. NASCAR reported that he first came on board as a shock specialist and later became engineer of the No. 2 Cup Series car in 2007. He also worked on Team Penske's No. 22 program and played a role in the organization's championship-winning efforts in both 2010 and 2012.

In January 2016, Team Penske promoted Wilson to crew chief of the No. 22 Ford Mustang in the NASCAR Xfinity Series. He replaced Greg Erwin after Erwin was moved to team manager of the Xfinity program.

Wilson and Austin Cindric built a strong partnership in the Xfinity Series. Team Penske credited the duo with 13 victories, the 2020 drivers' championship, and the 2021 owners' championship. In 2021, the No. 22 team opened the season with a win at Daytona International Speedway and went on to record five wins on the way to the owners' title.

For the 2022 season, Wilson moved to Wood Brothers Racing as crew chief of the No. 21 Cup Series team for Harrison Burton's rookie season. In August 2023, Team Penske and Wood Brothers Racing announced that Wilson would move from the No. 21 team to the No. 2 team, replacing Jeremy Bullins and reuniting with Cindric. The change took effect beginning with the 2023 Southern 500 and continued into 2024.

Under Wilson, the No. 2 Cup team won at World Wide Technology Raceway in 2024 and again added a victory at Talladega Superspeedway during the 2025 season, along with playoff appearances in both years. Team Penske described Wilson as the longest-tenured active road crew member in the organization entering 2026.
