= 2025 The Duel at Daytona =

NASCAR Duels at Daytona

Race details
- Date: February 13, 2025
- Location: Daytona International Speedway; Daytona Beach, Florida
- Course: Permanent racing facility 2.5 mi (4 km)
- Distance: Race 1: 60 laps, 150 mi (240 km); Race 2: 60 laps, 150 mi (240 km)
- Avg Speed: Race 1: 130.909 miles per hour (210.678 km/h); Race 2: 161.628 miles per hour (260.115 km/h)

Race 1
- Pole position: Chase Briscoe
- Most laps led: Bubba Wallace (21)
- Winner: Bubba Wallace

Race 2
- Pole position: Austin Cindric
- Most laps led: Erik Jones (16)
- Winner: Austin Cindric

Television
- Network: FS1 & MRN
- Announcers: Mike Joy, Clint Bowyer, and Kevin Harvick (Television); Alex Hayden, Mike Bagley, and Rusty Wallace (Booth); Dave Moody (1 & 2), Kyle Rickey (Backstretch), and Tim Catalfamo (3 & 4) (Turns) (Radio)

The 2025 The Duel at Daytona were a pair of NASCAR Cup Series stock car races that was held on February 13, 2025, at Daytona International Speedway in Daytona Beach, Florida. Both were contested over 60 laps, they were the qualifying races for the 2025 Daytona 500.

== Report ==
=== Background ===
Daytona International Speedway, where the races were held.

Daytona International Speedway is one of three superspeedways to hold NASCAR races, the other two being Atlanta Motor Speedway and Talladega Superspeedway. The standard track at Daytona International Speedway is a four-turn superspeedway that is 2.5 miles (4.0 km) long. The track's turns are banked at 31 degrees, while the front stretch, the location of the finish line, is banked at 18 degrees.

== Qualifying ==
Chase Briscoe scored the pole for the race with a time of 49.249 and a speed of 182.745 mph (294.100 km/h).

=== Qualifying results ===
Pos	No.	Driver	Team	Manufacturer	R1	R2
1	19	Chase Briscoe	Joe Gibbs Racing	Toyota	49.218	49.249
2	2	Austin Cindric	Team Penske	Ford	49.370	49.325
3	60	Ryan Preece	RFK Racing	Ford	49.356	49.335
4	22	Joey Logano	Team Penske	Ford	49.401	49.358
5	21	Josh Berry	Wood Brothers Racing	Ford	49.484	49.376
6	11	Denny Hamlin	Joe Gibbs Racing	Toyota	49.496	49.413
7	3	Austin Dillon	Richard Childress Racing	Chevrolet	49.487	49.444
8	20	Christopher Bell	Joe Gibbs Racing	Toyota	49.492	49.465
9	10	Ty Dillon	Kaulig Racing	Chevrolet	49.460	49.466
10	5	Kyle Larson	Hendrick Motorsports	Chevrolet	49.504	49.522
11	38	Zane Smith	Front Row Motorsports	Ford	49.505	—
12	48	Alex Bowman	Hendrick Motorsports	Chevrolet	49.506	—
13	8	Kyle Busch	Richard Childress Racing	Chevrolet	49.507	—
14	34	Todd Gilliland	Front Row Motorsports	Ford	49.535	—
15	9	Chase Elliott	Hendrick Motorsports	Chevrolet	49.538	—
16	6	Brad Keselowski	RFK Racing	Ford	49.545	—
17	71	Michael McDowell	Spire Motorsports	Chevrolet	49.571	—
18	17	Chris Buescher	RFK Racing	Ford	49.573	—
19	16	A. J. Allmendinger	Kaulig Racing	Chevrolet	49.616	—
20	12	Ryan Blaney	Team Penske	Ford	49.630	—
21	24	William Byron	Hendrick Motorsports	Chevrolet	49.636	—
22	56	Martin Truex Jr.	Tricon Garage	Toyota	49.641	—
23	4	Noah Gragson	Front Row Motorsports	Ford	49.660	—
24	54	Ty Gibbs	Joe Gibbs Racing	Toyota	49.695	—
25	99	Daniel Suárez	Trackhouse Racing	Chevrolet	49.742	—
26	45	Tyler Reddick	23XI Racing	Toyota	49.744	—
27	35	Riley Herbst (R)	23XI Racing	Toyota	49.770	—
28	23	Bubba Wallace	23XI Racing	Toyota	49.783	—
29	84	Jimmie Johnson	Legacy Motor Club	Toyota	49.783	—
30	88	Shane van Gisbergen (R)	Trackhouse Racing	Chevrolet	49.789	—
31	7	Justin Haley	Spire Motorsports	Chevrolet	49.825	—
32	41	Cole Custer	Haas Factory Team	Ford	49.830	—
33	40	Justin Allgaier (i)	JR Motorsports	Chevrolet	49.863	—
34	77	Carson Hocevar	Spire Motorsports	Chevrolet	49.865	—
35	01	Corey LaJoie	Rick Ware Racing	Ford	49.879	—
36	43	Erik Jones	Legacy Motor Club	Toyota	49.912	—
37	1	Ross Chastain	Trackhouse Racing	Chevrolet	49.997	—
38	42	John Hunter Nemechek	Legacy Motor Club	Toyota	50.025	—
39	91	Hélio Castroneves (i)	Trackhouse Racing	Chevrolet	50.062	—
40	62	Anthony Alfredo (i)	Beard Motorsports	Chevrolet	50.090	—
41	47	Ricky Stenhouse Jr.	Hyak Motorsports	Chevrolet	50.148	—
42	66	Chandler Smith (i)	Garage 66	Ford	50.351	—
43	78	B. J. McLeod	Live Fast Motorsports	Chevrolet	50.626	—
44	44	J. J. Yeley (i)	NY Racing Team	Chevrolet	51.055	—
45	51	Cody Ware	Rick Ware Racing	Ford	51.835	—
Official qualifying results

== Duels ==
=== Duel 1 ===
In the first duel, Justin Allgaier advanced to the race as the top finishing open car (excluding Martin Truex Jr., as the top open car in time trial qualifying), while Hélio Castroneves also advanced as an Open Exemption Provisional (OEP) competitor.

==== Duel 1 results ====
Pos	Grid	No	Driver	Team	Manufacturer	Laps	Points
1	15	23	Bubba Wallace	23XI Racing	Toyota	60	10
2	11	24	William Byron	Hendrick Motorsports	Chevrolet	60	9
3	5	10	Ty Dillon	Kaulig Racing	Chevrolet	60	8
4	19	1	Ross Chastain	Trackhouse Racing	Chevrolet	60	7
5	14	45	Tyler Reddick	23XI Racing	Toyota	60	6
6	10	16	A. J. Allmendinger	Kaulig Racing	Chevrolet	60	5
7	4	3	Austin Dillon	Richard Childress Racing	Chevrolet	60	4
8	8	9	Chase Elliott	Hendrick Motorsports	Chevrolet	60	3
9	17	40	Justin Allgaier (i)	JR Motorsports	Chevrolet	60	0
10	7	8	Kyle Busch	Richard Childress Racing	Chevrolet	60	1
11	13	54	Ty Gibbs	Joe Gibbs Racing	Toyota	60	0
12	9	71	Michael McDowell	Spire Motorsports	Chevrolet	60	0
13	2	60	Ryan Preece	RFK Racing	Ford	60	0
14	3	21	Josh Berry	Wood Brothers Racing	Ford	60	0
15	12	56	Martin Truex Jr.	Tricon Garage	Toyota	60	0
16	21	47	Ricky Stenhouse Jr.	Hyak Motorsports	Chevrolet	60	0
17	23	44	J. J. Yeley (i)	NY Racing Team	Chevrolet	60	0
18	18	77	Carson Hocevar	Spire Motorsports	Chevrolet	60	0
19	1	19	Chase Briscoe	Joe Gibbs Racing	Toyota	26	0
20	22	66	Chandler Smith (i)	Garage 66	Ford	13	0
21	16	7	Justin Haley	Spire Motorsports	Chevrolet	13	0
22	20	91	Hélio Castroneves (i)	Trackhouse Racing	Chevrolet	13	0
23	6	38	Zane Smith	Front Row Motorsports	Ford	6	0
Official race results

=== Duel 2 ===
Erik Jones appeared to have won the second duel with gap time of 0.004 seconds. However, a caution was called just few feet away from finish line. As NASCAR ruled that Cindric was still in the lead at the time of the caution being called with only few inches gap between him and Jones, Cindric was determined to be the winner. This call did not affect the starting grid, as Cindric was already the outside polesitter.

Corey LaJoie advanced as the top open car in the second duel, with Jimmie Johnson also advancing as the second-fastest open car during time trial qualifying.

==== Duel 2 results ====
Pos	Grid	No	Driver	Team	Manufacturer	Laps	Points
1	1	2	Austin Cindric	Team Penske	Ford	60	10
2	18	43	Erik Jones	Legacy Motor Club	Toyota	60	9
3	9	17	Chris Buescher	RFK Racing	Ford	60	8
4	3	11	Denny Hamlin	Joe Gibbs Racing	Toyota	60	7
5	2	22	Joey Logano	Team Penske	Ford	60	6
6	17	01	Corey LaJoie	Rick Ware Racing	Ford	60	5
7	7	34	Todd Gilliland	Front Row Motorsports	Ford	60	4
8	10	12	Ryan Blaney	Team Penske	Ford	60	3
9	19	42	John Hunter Nemechek	Legacy Motor Club	Toyota	60	2
10	4	20	Christopher Bell	Joe Gibbs Racing	Toyota	60	1
11	5	5	Kyle Larson	Hendrick Motorsports	Chevrolet	60	0
12	13	35	Riley Herbst (R)	23XI Racing	Toyota	60	0
13	20	62	Anthony Alfredo (i)	Beard Motorsports	Chevrolet	60	0
14	15	88	Shane van Gisbergen (R)	Trackhouse Racing	Chevrolet	60	0
15	22	51	Cody Ware	Rick Ware Racing	Ford	60	0
16	16	41	Cole Custer	Haas Factory Team	Ford	60	0
17	21	78	B. J. McLeod	Live Fast Motorsports	Chevrolet	60	0
18	11	4	Noah Gragson	Front Row Motorsports	Ford	60	0
19	14	84	Jimmie Johnson	Legacy Motor Club	Toyota	60	0
20	8	6	Brad Keselowski	RFK Racing	Ford	48	0
21	12	99	Daniel Suárez	Trackhouse Racing	Chevrolet	47	0
22	6	48	Alex Bowman	Hendrick Motorsports	Chevrolet	47	0
Official race results

== Media ==
=== Television ===
FS1
Booth announcers	Pit reporters	In-race analyst
Lap-by-lap: Mike Joy; Color-commentator: Clint Bowyer; Color-commentator: Kevin Harvick	Jamie Little; Regan Smith	Larry McReynolds

=== Radio ===
MRN Radio
Booth announcers	Turn announcers	Pit reporters
Lead announcer: Alex Hayden; Announcer: Mike Bagley; Announcer: Rusty Wallace	Turns 1 & 2: Dave Moody; Backstretch: Kyle Rickey; Turns 3 & 4: Tim Catalfamo	Steve Post; Chris Wilner; Alan Cavanna
