= 2026 Window World 450 =

NASCAR stock car race held in North Wilkesboro, U.S.

Race details
- Race 21 of 36 in the 2026 NASCAR Cup Series
- Date: July 19, 2026
- Location: North Wilkesboro Speedway in North Wilkesboro, North Carolina
- Course: Permanent racing facility
- Course length: 0.625 miles (1.006 km)
- Distance: 450 laps, 281.25 mi (452.63 km)
- Average speed: 88.397 miles per hour (142.261 km/h)

Pole position
Driver	Ryan Blaney	Team Penske
- Grid positions set by competition-based formula

Most laps led
Driver	Joey Logano	Team Penske
- Laps: 323

Fastest lap
Driver	Ross Chastain	Trackhouse Racing
- Time: 18.665

Winner
No. 22	Joey Logano	Team Penske

Television in the United States
- Network: TNT
- Announcers: Adam Alexander, Dale Earnhardt Jr., and Steve Letarte
- Nielsen ratings: 2.4 million

Radio in the United States
- Radio: PRN
- Booth announcers: Brad Gillie and Nick Yeoman
- Turn announcers: Pat Patterson (4)

The 2026 Window World 450 was a NASCAR Cup Series race held on July 19, 2026, at North Wilkesboro Speedway in North Wilkesboro, North Carolina. Contested over 450 laps on the 0.625-mile-long (1.006 km) asphalt short track, it was the 21st race of the 2026 NASCAR Cup Series season, as well as the fourth race of the 2026 NASCAR In-Season Challenge.

Joey Logano won the race. Denny Hamlin finished 2nd, and Chase Briscoe finished 3rd. Ty Gibbs and Shane van Gisbergen rounded out the top five, and Bubba Wallace, Brad Keselowski, Todd Gilliland, Daniel Suárez, and Ryan Preece rounded out the top ten.

Ryan Blaney officially clinched his spot in The Chase.

== Report ==
=== Background ===
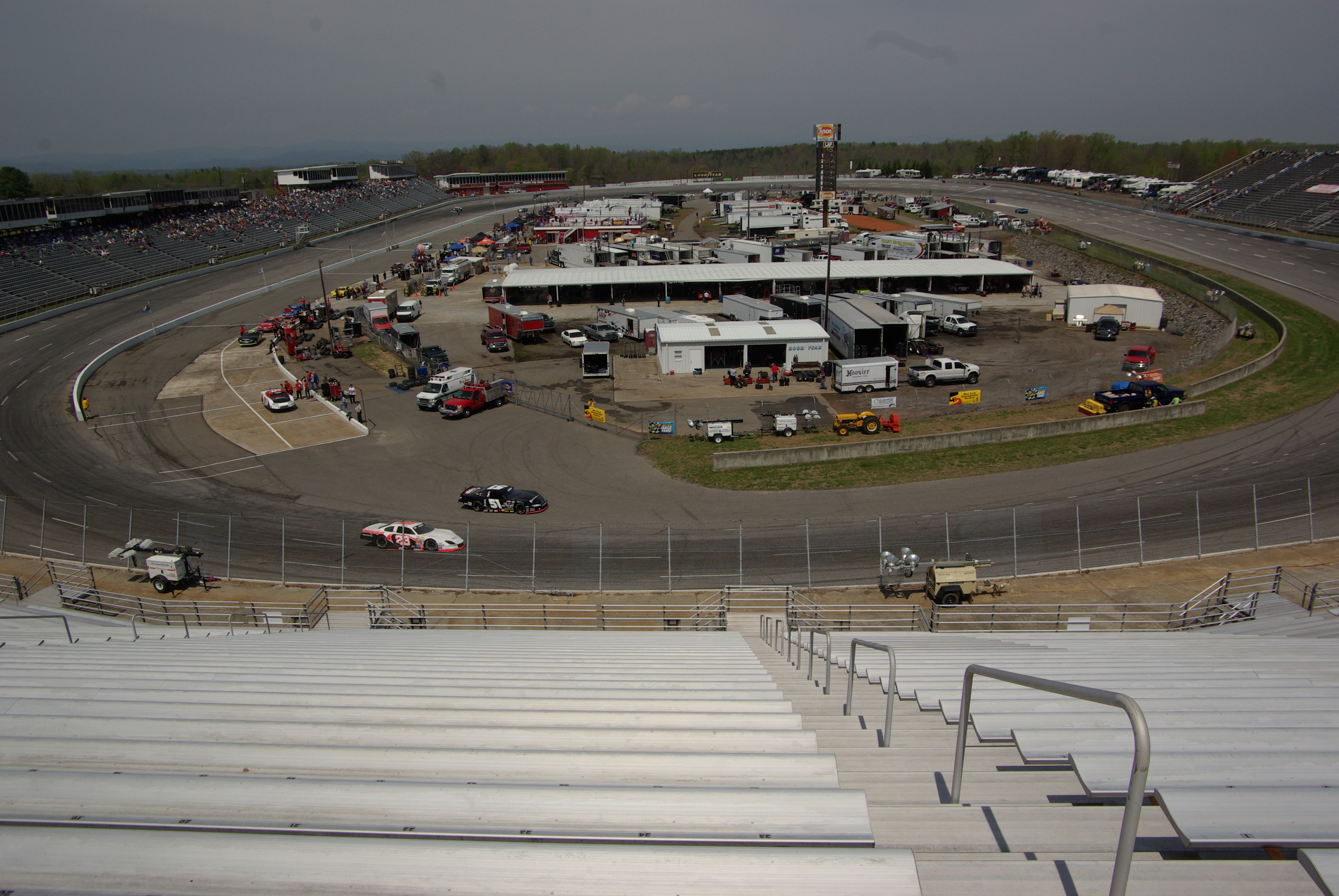
North Wilkesboro Speedway, the track where the race will be held.

North Wilkesboro Speedway is a 0.625 miles (1.006 km) paved oval short track in North Wilkesboro, North Carolina. The track has hosted a variety of racing events since its inaugural season of racing in 1947; primarily races sanctioned by NASCAR. It has been owned by Speedway Motorsports, LLC (SMI) since 2007 with Ronald Queen serving as director of operations. North Wilkesboro Speedway is served by U.S. Route 421.

The track has a current capacity of 25,000 as of 2023, down from its peak of 60,000 in 1996. NWS retains a vintage aesthetic from the 1990s as part of an effort to preserve the historical value of the track. As a result, the facility retains some of its original buildings built before the track's first closure in 1996, including buildings featuring Winston Cigarettes sponsorship and suites built in the 1980s. Developers in recent years have also added other amenities as part of a revival effort that started in 2022.

When the race returned to the schedule, it was originally scheduled as a 400 lap event, being dubbed as the "Window World 400". However, on December 4, 2025, North Wilkesboro track officials announced the race would be extended by 50 laps, being dubbed as the "Window World 450".

==== Entry list ====
- (R) denotes rookie driver.
- (i) denotes driver who is ineligible for series driver points.

No.	Driver	Team	Manufacturer
1	Ross Chastain	Trackhouse Racing	Chevrolet
2	Austin Cindric	Team Penske	Ford
3	Austin Dillon	Richard Childress Racing	Chevrolet
4	Noah Gragson	Front Row Motorsports	Ford
5	Kyle Larson	Hendrick Motorsports	Chevrolet
6	Brad Keselowski	RFK Racing	Ford
7	Daniel Suárez	Spire Motorsports	Chevrolet
9	Chase Elliott	Hendrick Motorsports	Chevrolet
10	Ty Dillon	Kaulig Racing	Chevrolet
11	Denny Hamlin	Joe Gibbs Racing	Toyota
12	Ryan Blaney	Team Penske	Ford
16	A. J. Allmendinger	Kaulig Racing	Chevrolet
17	Chris Buescher	RFK Racing	Ford
19	Chase Briscoe	Joe Gibbs Racing	Toyota
20	Christopher Bell	Joe Gibbs Racing	Toyota
21	Josh Berry	Wood Brothers Racing	Ford
22	Joey Logano	Team Penske	Ford
23	Bubba Wallace	23XI Racing	Toyota
24	William Byron	Hendrick Motorsports	Chevrolet
33	Austin Hill (i)	Richard Childress Racing	Chevrolet
34	Todd Gilliland	Front Row Motorsports	Ford
35	Riley Herbst	23XI Racing	Toyota
38	Zane Smith	Front Row Motorsports	Ford
41	Cole Custer	Haas Factory Team	Chevrolet
42	John Hunter Nemechek	Legacy Motor Club	Toyota
43	Erik Jones	Legacy Motor Club	Toyota
45	Tyler Reddick	23XI Racing	Toyota
47	Ricky Stenhouse Jr.	Hyak Motorsports	Chevrolet
48	Alex Bowman	Hendrick Motorsports	Chevrolet
51	Cody Ware	Rick Ware Racing	Chevrolet
54	Ty Gibbs	Joe Gibbs Racing	Toyota
60	Ryan Preece	RFK Racing	Ford
66	Chad Finchum (i)	Garage 66	Ford
71	Michael McDowell	Spire Motorsports	Chevrolet
77	Carson Hocevar	Spire Motorsports	Chevrolet
88	Connor Zilisch (R)	Trackhouse Racing	Chevrolet
97	Shane van Gisbergen	Trackhouse Racing	Chevrolet
Official entry list

== Practice ==
Christopher Bell was the fastest in the practice session with a time of 18.222 seconds and a speed of 123.477 mph (198.717 km/h).

=== Practice results ===
Pos	No.	Driver	Team	Manufacturer	Time	Speed
1	20	Christopher Bell	Joe Gibbs Racing	Toyota	18.222	123.477
2	11	Denny Hamlin	Joe Gibbs Racing	Toyota	18.236	123.382
3	1	Ross Chastain	Trackhouse Racing	Chevrolet	18.283	123.065
Official practice results

== Qualifying ==
Qualifying for the race was canceled due to inclement weather. Ryan Blaney was awarded the pole for the race as a result of NASCAR's pandemic formula.

=== Qualifying results ===
Pos	No.	Driver	Team	Manufacturer
1	12	Ryan Blaney	Team Penske	Ford
2	54	Ty Gibbs	Joe Gibbs Racing	Toyota
3	20	Christopher Bell	Joe Gibbs Racing	Toyota
4	77	Carson Hocevar	Spire Motorsports	Chevrolet
5	45	Tyler Reddick	23XI Racing	Toyota
6	43	Erik Jones	Legacy Motor Club	Toyota
7	11	Denny Hamlin	Joe Gibbs Racing	Toyota
8	97	Shane van Gisbergen	Trackhouse Racing	Chevrolet
9	17	Chris Buescher	RFK Racing	Ford
10	9	Chase Elliott	Hendrick Motorsports	Chevrolet
11	22	Joey Logano	Team Penske	Ford
12	3	Austin Dillon	Richard Childress Racing	Chevrolet
13	1	Ross Chastain	Trackhouse Racing	Chevrolet
14	2	Austin Cindric	Team Penske	Ford
15	24	William Byron	Hendrick Motorsports	Chevrolet
16	71	Michael McDowell	Spire Motorsports	Chevrolet
17	7	Daniel Suárez	Spire Motorsports	Chevrolet
18	34	Todd Gilliland	Front Row Motorsports	Ford
19	42	John Hunter Nemechek	Legacy Motor Club	Toyota
20	41	Cole Custer	Haas Factory Team	Chevrolet
21	60	Ryan Preece	RFK Racing	Ford
22	10	Ty Dillon	Kaulig Racing	Chevrolet
23	6	Brad Keselowski	RFK Racing	Ford
24	47	Ricky Stenhouse Jr.	Hyak Motorsports	Chevrolet
25	48	Alex Bowman	Hendrick Motorsports	Chevrolet
26	23	Bubba Wallace	23XI Racing	Toyota
27	5	Kyle Larson	Hendrick Motorsports	Chevrolet
28	21	Josh Berry	Wood Brothers Racing	Ford
29	38	Zane Smith	Front Row Motorsports	Ford
30	19	Chase Briscoe	Joe Gibbs Racing	Toyota
31	4	Noah Gragson	Front Row Motorsports	Ford
32	88	Connor Zilisch (R)	Trackhouse Racing	Chevrolet
33	33	Austin Hill (i)	Richard Childress Racing	Chevrolet
34	35	Riley Herbst	23XI Racing	Toyota
35	16	A. J. Allmendinger	Kaulig Racing	Chevrolet
36	51	Cody Ware	Rick Ware Racing	Chevrolet
37	66	Chad Finchum (i)	Garage 66	Ford
Official starting lineup

== Race ==
=== Stage 1 ===
Ty Gibbs, with a push from Carson Hocevar, pulled away at the front. Christopher Bell held third, and Erik Jones moved up to fill the fourth position. Bell moves around Hocevar for second and Tyler Reddick moved up to the inside of Jones and ran multiple laps side-by-side.

Ross Chastain’s crew had several issues with pre-race inspection. As a result, he was relegated to the rear of the field for the start and had to make a drive through penalty down pit road after taking the green flag. Chastain went a lap down in the process. It took only 22 laps for Gibbs to catch the rear of the field and begin lapping cars.

Halfway through the first stage, Ryan Blaney, who started 35th, had advanced to the 26th position, working to stay on the lead lap. The first caution of the night came out on lap 40 when Zane Smith tapped the car of John Hunter Nemechek, causing him to spin out.

Most cars took four tires on their pit stop under the caution. Shane van Gisbergen opted for just two and improved his track position into the top five. Connor Zilisch and Kyle Larson collided on pit road, causing damage to the right front wheel on Larson’s car.

Denny Hamlin stayed out and inherited the lead. Gibbs, Bell, and SVG followed. SVG got a good jump and ran up next to Hamlin on the first lap after the restart. However, he could not hold the top spot, as SVG bumped past him into the lead. With the old tires, Hamlin began dropping back into the pack.

With four fresh Goodyear tires, Joey Logano was the car on the move, charging up into the third spot.

SVG, Gibbs, and Logano raced to the green and white checkered flag with Gibbs just nosing out SVG for the stage win.

=== Stage 2 ===
Gibbs, Logano, SVG, Hamlin, and Hocevar led the field off pit road. However, Gibbs was caught speeding on pit road and sent to the rear of the field for the restart. SVG and Logano raced side-by-side until SVG was able to pull ahead and block a crossover by Logano. Hocevar came up to join the lead battle, driving under Logano. The #77 car could not make the pass and dropped behind Logano. Chase Elliott ran fourth, and Hamlin sat fifth.

Ryan Blaney joined the top ten for the first time since being kicked to the rear of the field at the start. Logano went to the outside of SVG and retook the lead. Bubba Wallace replaced his boss, Denny Hamlin, in the top five.

As the leaders began moving through lapped traffic, Elliott drove into the second spot, and Hamlin found new life running back in third ahead of SVG. Chase Briscoe replaced Hocevar in the fifth position.

On lap 163 of the race, Logano put Gibbs a lap down.

Nearing the halfway point of Stage 2, green flag pit stops was coming up. Christopher Bell was the first of the leaders to hit pit road on lap 173. A. J. Allmendinger hit the outside wall while being lapped by Logano. He broke the right rear toe link and was able to nurse the car to pit road without bringing out a caution.

On lap 183, Alex Bowman and Tyler Reddick collided trying to get to pit road, and the caution was displayed. This could be a nightmare for teams that have already pitted.

Logano and Hamlin led the field back to the green. Only 15 cars remained on the lead lap, as those teams that had pitted were a lap down. Just after the restart on lap 199, Christopher Bell and Josh Berry collided, and the caution came out again. Bell complained to his crew that the brake pedal on his car was going to the floor.

Again, it was Logano and Hamlin leading the field back to the green flag.

With 30 laps to go in Stage 2, Logano, Hocevar, Hamlin, SVG, and Blaney were the top five.

With laps winding down to the green and white checkered flag, Logano was pulling away at the front of the pack. Hamlin was well-positioned in second. Briscoe, Hocevar, and SVG were battling for the most Stage points they could gain.

=== Final stage ===
Logano, Hamlin, Wallace, Briscoe, and SVG are the top five heading to the restart. Ty Gibbs got his lap back, and 15 cars remain on the lead lap for the final Stage.

With 150 laps to go in the race, the top five remain the same, with Logano building his advantage at the front consistently. Logano has performed well at the All-Star races held at North Wilkesboro. Tonight’s performance was his most impressive of the season. His victory in Stage 2 was Logano’s first of the season, and he has led more laps tonight than all of 2026 combined.

With 115 laps to go, Carson Hocevar’s car had completely lost the handle. He dropped to 13th place, the last car on the lead lap.

With 90 laps to go, Hamlin was the first of the leaders to pit, followed by Logano one lap later. When Ryan Blaney came in, he was penalized for speeding, and was required to return to the pit road to serve his penalty. The penalty dropped Blaney out of contention for the win.

With all pit stops completed, only five cars remained on the lead lap. Logano, Hamlin, Briscoe, SVG, and Wallace remained in the hunt for the win. With 50 laps to go, the interval between Logano and Hamlin was a half-second.

With 30 laps to go, the leaders were catching heavy lapped traffic. Logano had built a one-second advantage. Logano worked his way quickly through lapped traffic until he reached the car of Riley Herbst. Who is Herbst’s car owner? Denny Hamlin, who closed to within less than a half-second. Logano made the pass with 10 laps to go, stretched the advantage again, and drove away to the win. He led 323 of the 450 laps at North Wilkesboro.

=== Race results ===
==== Stage Results ====
Stage One Laps: 80

Pos	No	Driver	Team	Manufacturer	Points
1	54	Ty Gibbs	Joe Gibbs Racing	Toyota	10
2	97	Shane van Gisbergen	Trackhouse Racing	Chevrolet	9
3	22	Joey Logano	Team Penske	Ford	8
4	11	Denny Hamlin	Joe Gibbs Racing	Toyota	7
5	77	Carson Hocevar	Spire Motorsports	Chevrolet	6
6	20	Christopher Bell	Joe Gibbs Racing	Toyota	5
7	9	Chase Elliott	Hendrick Motorsports	Chevrolet	4
8	19	Chase Briscoe	Joe Gibbs Racing	Toyota	3
9	2	Austin Cindric	Team Penske	Ford	2
10	24	William Byron	Hendrick Motorsports	Chevrolet	1

Stage Two Laps: 185

Pos	No	Driver	Team	Manufacturer	Points
1	22	Joey Logano	Team Penske	Ford	10
2	11	Denny Hamlin	Joe Gibbs Racing	Toyota	9
3	19	Chase Briscoe	Joe Gibbs Racing	Toyota	8
4	23	Bubba Wallace	23XI Racing	Toyota	7
5	97	Shane van Gisbergen	Trackhouse Racing	Chevrolet	6
6	77	Carson Hocevar	Spire Motorsports	Chevrolet	5
7	6	Brad Keselowski	RFK Racing	Ford	4
8	12	Ryan Blaney	Team Penske	Ford	3
9	34	Todd Gilliland	Front Row Motorsports	Ford	2
10	7	Daniel Suárez	Spire Motorsports	Chevrolet	1

=== Final Stage Results ===
Stage Three Laps: 185

Pos	Grid	No	Driver	Team	Manufacturer	Laps	Points
1	11	22	Joey Logano	Team Penske	Ford	450	73
2	7	11	Denny Hamlin	Joe Gibbs Racing	Toyota	450	51
3	30	19	Chase Briscoe	Joe Gibbs Racing	Toyota	450	45
4	2	54	Ty Gibbs	Joe Gibbs Racing	Toyota	450	43
5	8	97	Shane van Gisbergen	Trackhouse Racing	Chevrolet	450	47
6	26	23	Bubba Wallace	23XI Racing	Toyota	450	38
7	23	6	Brad Keselowski	RFK Racing	Ford	449	34
8	18	34	Todd Gilliland	Front Row Motorsports	Ford	449	31
9	17	7	Daniel Suárez	Spire Motorsports	Chevrolet	449	29
10	21	60	Ryan Preece	RFK Racing	Ford	449	27
11	1	12	Ryan Blaney	Team Penske	Ford	448	29
12	15	24	William Byron	Hendrick Motorsports	Chevrolet	448	26
13	4	77	Carson Hocevar	Spire Motorsports	Chevrolet	448	35
14	14	2	Austin Cindric	Team Penske	Ford	448	25
15	27	5	Kyle Larson	Hendrick Motorsports	Chevrolet	448	22
16	22	10	Ty Dillon	Kaulig Racing	Chevrolet	448	21
17	10	9	Chase Elliott	Hendrick Motorsports	Chevrolet	447	24
18	34	35	Riley Herbst	23XI Racing	Toyota	447	19
19	3	20	Christopher Bell	Joe Gibbs Racing	Toyota	447	23
20	9	17	Chris Buescher	RFK Racing	Ford	447	17
21	6	43	Erik Jones	Legacy Motor Club	Toyota	447	16
22	29	38	Zane Smith	Front Row Motorsports	Ford	447	15
23	12	3	Austin Dillon	Richard Childress Racing	Chevrolet	446	14
24	16	71	Michael McDowell	Spire Motorsports	Chevrolet	446	13
25	31	4	Noah Gragson	Front Row Motorsports	Ford	446	12
26	25	48	Alex Bowman	Hendrick Motorsports	Chevrolet	446	11
27	13	1	Ross Chastain	Trackhouse Racing	Chevrolet	446	11
28	20	41	Cole Custer	Haas Factory Team	Chevrolet	446	9
29	36	51	Cody Ware	Rick Ware Racing	Chevrolet	446	8
30	5	45	Tyler Reddick	23XI Racing	Toyota	445	7
31	19	42	John Hunter Nemechek	Legacy Motor Club	Toyota	445	6
32	32	88	Connor Zilisch (R)	Trackhouse Racing	Chevrolet	443	5
33	33	33	Austin Hill (i)	Richard Childress Racing	Chevrolet	442	0
34	24	47	Ricky Stenhouse Jr.	Hyak Motorsports	Chevrolet	442	3
35	37	66	Chad Finchum (i)	Garage 66	Ford	303	0
36	28	21	Josh Berry	Wood Brothers Racing	Ford	199	1
37	35	16	A. J. Allmendinger	Kaulig Racing	Chevrolet	190	1
Official race results

=== Race statistics ===
- Lead changes: 17 among 9 different drivers
- Cautions/Laps: 5 for 43
- Red flags: 0
- Time of race: 2 hours, 50 minutes and 54 seconds
- Average speed: 88.397 miles per hour (142.261 km/h)

== Media ==
=== Television ===
TNT covered the race on the television side. Adam Alexander, Dale Earnhardt Jr. and Steve Letarte called the race from the broadcast booth. Marty Snider, Shannon Spake, Danielle Trotta and Mamba Smith handled pit road for the television side.

TNT
Booth announcers	Pit reporters
Lap-by-lap: Adam Alexander; Color-commentator: Dale Earnhardt Jr. Color-commentator: Steve Letarte	Marty Snider; Shannon Spake; Danielle Trotta; Mamba Smith

=== Radio ===
The race was broadcast on radio by the Performance Racing Network and simulcast on Sirius XM NASCAR Radio. Brad Gillie and Nick Yeoman called the race from the booth when the field races down the front stretch. Pat Patterson called the race from outside of turn 4 when the field races on turn 4. On pit road, PRN was manned by Brett McMillan, Andrew Kurland and Wendy Venturini.

PRN
Booth announcers	Turn announcers	Pit reporters
Lead announcer: Brad Gillie; Announcer: Nick Yeoman	Turn 4: Pat Patterson	Brett McMillan; Andrew Kurland; Wendy Venturini

== Standings after the race ==
Drivers' Championship standings

	Pos	Driver	Points
	1	Denny Hamlin	842
	2	Tyler Reddick	774 (–68)
	3	Ryan Blaney	755 (–87)
	4	Ty Gibbs	708 (–134)
	5	Chase Elliott	634 (–208)
	6	Kyle Larson	616 (–226)
1	7	Carson Hocevar	598 (–244)
2	8	Chase Briscoe	587 (–255)
2	9	Chris Buescher	585 (–257)
1	10	Christopher Bell	574 (–268)
	11	Daniel Suárez	558 (–284)
	12	William Byron	546 (–296)
	13	Bubba Wallace	531 (–311)
1	14	Shane van Gisbergen	516 (–326)
2	15	Joey Logano	511 (–331)
2	16	Austin Cindric	495 (–347)
Official driver's standings

Manufacturers' Championship standings

Pos	Manufacturer	Points
1	Toyota	962
2	Chevrolet	838 (–124)
3	Ford	732 (–230)

- Note: Only the first 16 positions are included for the driver standings.

=== NASCAR In-Season Challenge bracket ===
Sonoma
1	#45 Tyler Reddick	36th
32	#48 Alex Bowman	10th
16	#2 Austin Cindric	13th
17	#6 Brad Keselowski	15th
8	#7 Daniel Suárez	31st
25	#34 Todd Gilliland	29th
9	#77 Carson Hocevar	11th
24	#38 Zane Smith	18th
12	#19 Chase Briscoe	2nd
21	#16 A. J. Allmendinger	16th
5	#54 Ty Gibbs	3rd
28	#3 Austin Dillon	27th
13	#23 Bubba Wallace	22nd
20	#71 Michael McDowell	9th
4	#9 Chase Elliott	17th
29	#4 Noah Gragson	32nd
2	#11 Denny Hamlin	26th
31	#10 Ty Dillon	35th
15	#43 Erik Jones	23rd
18	#22 Joey Logano	24th
7	#17 Chris Buescher	19th
26	#42 John Hunter Nemechek	25th
10	#20 Christopher Bell	5th
23	#1 Ross Chastain	14th
11	#24 William Byron	12th
22	#47 Ricky Stenhouse Jr.	21st
6	#5 Kyle Larson	4th
27	#35 Riley Herbst	30th
14	#97 Shane van Gisbergen	1st
19	#60 Ryan Preece	8th
3	#12 Ryan Blaney	6th
30	#21 Josh Berry	28th

Chicagoland
32	#48 Bowman	5th
16	#2 Cindric	13th
25	#34 Gilliland	16th
9	#77 Hocevar	22nd
12	#19 Briscoe	1st
5	#54 Ty Gibbs	8th
20	#71 McDowell	29th
4	#9 Elliott	11th
2	#11 Hamlin	3rd
15	#43 Jones	15th
7	#17 Buescher	19th
10	#20 Bell	2nd
11	#24 Byron	4th
6	#5 Larson	34th
14	#97 van Gisbergen	25th
3	#12 Blaney	7th

Atlanta
32	#48 Bowman	22nd
25	#34 Gilliland	19th
12	#19 Briscoe	36th
4	#9 Elliott	13th
2	#11 Hamlin	12th
10	#20 Bell	2nd
11	#24 Byron	16th
3	#12 Blaney	1st

North Wilkesboro
25	#34 Gilliland	8th
4	#9 Elliott	17th
10	#20 Bell	19th
3	#12 Blaney	11th

Indianapolis
25	#34 Gilliland	24th
3	#12 Blaney	26th

Previous race: 2026 Quaker State 400	NASCAR Cup Series; 2026 season	Next race: 2026 Brickyard 400
