= 2026 eero 400 =

NASCAR stock car race held in Joliet, Illinois, U.S.

Race details
- Race 19 of 36 in the 2026 NASCAR Cup Series
- Date: July 5, 2026
- Location: Chicagoland Speedway in Joliet, Illinois
- Course: Permanent racing facility
- Course length: 1.5 miles (2.446 km)
- Distance: 267 laps, 400.5 mi (644.5 km)
- Average speed: 126.941 miles per hour (204.292 km/h)

Pole position
Driver	Denny Hamlin	Joe Gibbs Racing
- Time: 30.296

Most laps led
Driver	William Byron	Hendrick Motorsports
- Laps: 94

Fastest lap
Driver	Bubba Wallace	23XI Racing
- Time: 30.229

Winner
No. 19	Chase Briscoe	Joe Gibbs Racing

Television in the United States
- Network: TNT
- Announcers: Adam Alexander, Dale Earnhardt Jr., and Steve Letarte
- Nielsen ratings: 2.1 million

Radio in the United States
- Radio: MRN
- Booth announcers: Alex Hayden, Mike Bagley and Todd Gordon
- Turn announcers: Kurt Becker (1 & 2) and Tim Catalfamo (3 & 4)

The 2026 eero 400 was an NASCAR Cup Series race that was held on July 5, 2026, at Chicagoland Speedway in Joliet, Illinois. Contested over 267 laps on the 1.5-mile (2.4 km) asphalt oval, it was the 19th race of the 2026 NASCAR Cup Series season, as well as the second race of the 2026 NASCAR In-Season Challenge.

Chase Briscoe won the race. Christopher Bell finished 2nd, and Denny Hamlin finished 3rd. William Byron and Alex Bowman rounded out the top five, and Bubba Wallace, Ryan Blaney, Ty Gibbs, Corey Heim, and Riley Herbst rounded out the top ten.

== Report ==
=== Background ===
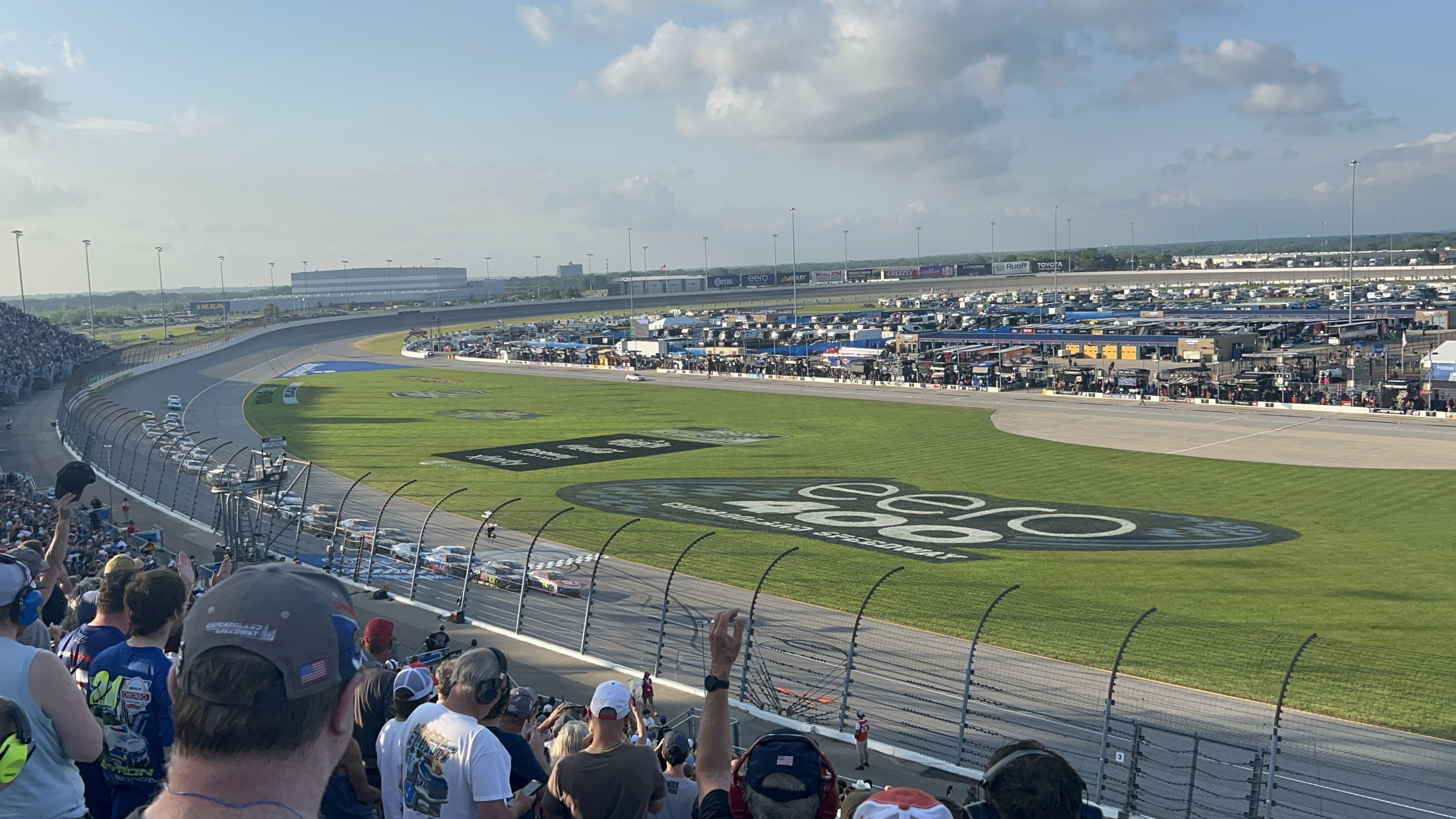
Chicagoland Speedway, the track where the race was held.

Chicagoland Speedway is a 1.5 miles (2.4 km) tri-oval speedway in Joliet, Illinois, southwest of Chicago. The speedway opened in 2001 and currently hosts NASCAR racing. Until 2011, the speedway also hosted the IndyCar Series, recording numerous close finishes including the closest finish in IndyCar history. The speedway is owned and operated by International Speedway Corporation and located adjacent to Route 66 Raceway.

The race is scheduled to mark the Cup Series' return to Chicagoland Speedway for the first time since 2019.

On May 21, eero was announced as the title sponsor for the race.

==== Entry list ====
- (R) denotes rookie driver.
- (i) denotes driver who is ineligible for series driver points.

No.	Driver	Team	Manufacturer
1	Ross Chastain	Trackhouse Racing	Chevrolet
2	Austin Cindric	Team Penske	Ford
3	Austin Dillon	Richard Childress Racing	Chevrolet
4	Noah Gragson	Front Row Motorsports	Ford
5	Kyle Larson	Hendrick Motorsports	Chevrolet
6	Brad Keselowski	RFK Racing	Ford
7	Daniel Suárez	Spire Motorsports	Chevrolet
9	Chase Elliott	Hendrick Motorsports	Chevrolet
10	Ty Dillon	Kaulig Racing	Chevrolet
11	Denny Hamlin	Joe Gibbs Racing	Toyota
12	Ryan Blaney	Team Penske	Ford
16	A. J. Allmendinger	Kaulig Racing	Chevrolet
17	Chris Buescher	RFK Racing	Ford
19	Chase Briscoe	Joe Gibbs Racing	Toyota
20	Christopher Bell	Joe Gibbs Racing	Toyota
21	Josh Berry	Wood Brothers Racing	Ford
22	Joey Logano	Team Penske	Ford
23	Bubba Wallace	23XI Racing	Toyota
24	William Byron	Hendrick Motorsports	Chevrolet
33	Austin Hill (i)	Richard Childress Racing	Chevrolet
34	Todd Gilliland	Front Row Motorsports	Ford
35	Riley Herbst	23XI Racing	Toyota
38	Zane Smith	Front Row Motorsports	Ford
41	Cole Custer	Haas Factory Team	Chevrolet
42	John Hunter Nemechek	Legacy Motor Club	Toyota
43	Erik Jones	Legacy Motor Club	Toyota
44	J. J. Yeley (i)	NY Racing Team	Chevrolet
45	Tyler Reddick	23XI Racing	Toyota
47	Ricky Stenhouse Jr.	Hyak Motorsports	Chevrolet
48	Alex Bowman	Hendrick Motorsports	Chevrolet
51	Cody Ware	Rick Ware Racing	Chevrolet
54	Ty Gibbs	Joe Gibbs Racing	Toyota
60	Ryan Preece	RFK Racing	Ford
67	Corey Heim (i)	23XI Racing	Toyota
71	Michael McDowell	Spire Motorsports	Chevrolet
77	Carson Hocevar	Spire Motorsports	Chevrolet
88	Connor Zilisch (R)	Trackhouse Racing	Chevrolet
97	Shane van Gisbergen	Trackhouse Racing	Chevrolet
Official entry list

== Practice ==
Riley Herbst was the fastest in the practice session with a time of 30.326 seconds and a speed of 178.065 mph (286.568 km/h).

=== Practice results ===
Pos	No.	Driver	Team	Manufacturer	Time	Speed
1	35	Riley Herbst	23XI Racing	Toyota	30.326	178.065
2	23	Bubba Wallace	23XI Racing	Toyota	30.349	177.930
3	5	Kyle Larson	Hendrick Motorsports	Chevrolet	30.358	177.877
Official practice results

== Qualifying ==
Denny Hamlin scored the pole for the race with a time of 30.296 and a speed of 178.241 mph (286.851 km/h).

=== Qualifying results ===
Pos	No.	Driver	Team	Manufacturer	Time	Speed
1	11	Denny Hamlin	Joe Gibbs Racing	Toyota	30.296	178.241
2	5	Kyle Larson	Hendrick Motorsports	Chevrolet	30.297	178.235
3	17	Chris Buescher	RFK Racing	Ford	30.311	178.153
4	6	Brad Keselowski	RFK Racing	Ford	30.322	178.089
5	54	Ty Gibbs	Joe Gibbs Racing	Toyota	30.323	178.083
6	20	Christopher Bell	Joe Gibbs Racing	Toyota	30.398	177.643
7	19	Chase Briscoe	Joe Gibbs Racing	Toyota	30.399	177.637
8	23	Bubba Wallace	23XI Racing	Toyota	30.420	177.515
9	9	Chase Elliott	Hendrick Motorsports	Chevrolet	30.424	177.491
10	24	William Byron	Hendrick Motorsports	Chevrolet	30.472	177.212
11	16	A. J. Allmendinger	Kaulig Racing	Chevrolet	30.481	177.160
12	48	Alex Bowman	Hendrick Motorsports	Chevrolet	30.502	177.038
13	45	Tyler Reddick	23XI Racing	Toyota	30.523	176.916
14	12	Ryan Blaney	Team Penske	Ford	30.528	176.887
15	77	Carson Hocevar	Spire Motorsports	Chevrolet	30.531	176.869
16	38	Zane Smith	Front Row Motorsports	Ford	30.552	176.748
17	42	John Hunter Nemechek	Legacy Motor Club	Toyota	30.564	176.678
18	35	Riley Herbst	23XI Racing	Toyota	30.576	176.609
19	1	Ross Chastain	Trackhouse Racing	Chevrolet	30.580	176.586
20	60	Ryan Preece	RFK Racing	Ford	30.629	176.304
21	88	Connor Zilisch (R)	Trackhouse Racing	Chevrolet	30.632	176.286
22	43	Erik Jones	Legacy Motor Club	Toyota	30.683	175.993
23	2	Austin Cindric	Team Penske	Ford	30.706	175.861
24	47	Ricky Stenhouse Jr.	Hyak Motorsports	Chevrolet	30.770	175.496
25	3	Austin Dillon	Richard Childress Racing	Chevrolet	30.779	175.444
26	7	Daniel Suárez	Spire Motorsports	Chevrolet	30.795	175.353
27	10	Ty Dillon	Kaulig Racing	Chevrolet	30.813	175.251
28	67	Corey Heim (i)	23XI Racing	Toyota	30.827	175.171
29	34	Todd Gilliland	Front Row Motorsports	Ford	30.911	174.695
30	97	Shane van Gisbergen	Trackhouse Racing	Chevrolet	30.961	174.413
31	22	Joey Logano	Team Penske	Ford	30.996	174.216
32	4	Noah Gragson	Front Row Motorsports	Ford	31.021	174.076
33	41	Cole Custer	Haas Factory Team	Chevrolet	31.074	173.779
34	21	Josh Berry	Wood Brothers Racing	Ford	31.155	173.327
35	33	Austin Hill (i)	Richard Childress Racing	Chevrolet	31.171	173.328
36	44	J. J. Yeley (i)	NY Racing Team	Chevrolet	31.969	168.914
37	51	Cody Ware	Rick Ware Racing	Chevrolet	0.000	0.000
38	71	Michael McDowell	Spire Motorsports	Chevrolet	0.000	0.000
Official qualifying results

== Race ==
=== Race results ===
==== Stage Results ====
Stage One Laps: 80

Pos	No	Driver	Team	Manufacturer	Points
1	24	William Byron	Hendrick Motorsports	Chevrolet	10
2	5	Kyle Larson	Hendrick Motorsports	Chevrolet	9
3	23	Bubba Wallace	23XI Racing	Toyota	8
4	2	Austin Cindric	Team Penske	Ford	7
5	19	Chase Briscoe	Joe Gibbs Racing	Toyota	6
6	17	Chris Buescher	RFK Racing	Ford	5
7	35	Riley Herbst	23XI Racing	Toyota	4
8	11	Denny Hamlin	Joe Gibbs Racing	Toyota	3
9	54	Ty Gibbs	Joe Gibbs Racing	Toyota	2
10	45	Tyler Reddick	23XI Racing	Toyota	1

Stage Two Laps: 80

Pos	No	Driver	Team	Manufacturer	Points
1	24	William Byron	Hendrick Motorsports	Chevrolet	10
2	19	Chase Briscoe	Joe Gibbs Racing	Toyota	9
3	11	Denny Hamlin	Joe Gibbs Racing	Toyota	8
4	54	Ty Gibbs	Joe Gibbs Racing	Toyota	7
5	12	Ryan Blaney	Team Penske	Ford	6
6	20	Christopher Bell	Joe Gibbs Racing	Toyota	5
7	9	Chase Elliott	Hendrick Motorsports	Chevrolet	4
8	48	Alex Bowman	Hendrick Motorsports	Chevrolet	3
9	2	Austin Cindric	Team Penske	Ford	2
10	42	John Hunter Nemechek	Legacy Motor Club	Toyota	1

=== Final Stage Results ===
Stage Three Laps: 107

Pos	Grid	No	Driver	Team	Manufacturer	Laps	Points
1	7	19	Chase Briscoe	Joe Gibbs Racing	Toyota	267	70
2	6	20	Christopher Bell	Joe Gibbs Racing	Toyota	267	40
3	1	11	Denny Hamlin	Joe Gibbs Racing	Toyota	267	45
4	10	24	William Byron	Hendrick Motorsports	Chevrolet	267	53
5	12	48	Alex Bowman	Hendrick Motorsports	Chevrolet	267	35
6	8	23	Bubba Wallace	23XI Racing	Toyota	267	40
7	14	12	Ryan Blaney	Team Penske	Ford	267	36
8	5	54	Ty Gibbs	Joe Gibbs Racing	Toyota	267	38
9	28	67	Corey Heim (i)	23XI Racing	Toyota	267	0
10	18	35	Riley Herbst	23XI Racing	Toyota	267	31
11	9	9	Chase Elliott	Hendrick Motorsports	Chevrolet	267	30
12	31	22	Joey Logano	Team Penske	Ford	267	25
13	23	2	Austin Cindric	Team Penske	Ford	267	33
14	26	7	Daniel Suárez	Spire Motorsports	Chevrolet	267	23
15	22	43	Erik Jones	Legacy Motor Club	Toyota	267	22
16	29	34	Todd Gilliland	Front Row Motorsports	Ford	267	21
17	11	16	A. J. Allmendinger	Kaulig Racing	Chevrolet	266	20
18	19	1	Ross Chastain	Trackhouse Racing	Chevrolet	266	19
19	3	17	Chris Buescher	RFK Racing	Ford	266	23
20	27	10	Ty Dillon	Kaulig Racing	Chevrolet	266	17
21	4	6	Brad Keselowski	RFK Racing	Ford	266	16
22	15	77	Carson Hocevar	Spire Motorsports	Chevrolet	266	15
23	17	42	John Hunter Nemechek	Legacy Motor Club	Toyota	266	14
24	25	3	Austin Dillon	Richard Childress Racing	Chevrolet	266	13
25	30	97	Shane van Gisbergen	Trackhouse Racing	Chevrolet	266	12
26	24	47	Ricky Stenhouse Jr.	Hyak Motorsports	Chevrolet	266	11
27	32	4	Noah Gragson	Front Row Motorsports	Ford	266	10
28	16	38	Zane Smith	Front Row Motorsports	Ford	266	9
29	38	71	Michael McDowell	Spire Motorsports	Chevrolet	266	8
30	37	51	Cody Ware	Rick Ware Racing	Chevrolet	266	7
31	33	41	Cole Custer	Haas Factory Team	Chevrolet	266	6
32	20	60	Ryan Preece	RFK Racing	Ford	266	5
33	34	21	Josh Berry	Wood Brothers Racing	Ford	265	4
34	2	5	Kyle Larson	Hendrick Motorsports	Chevrolet	265	12
35	36	44	J. J. Yeley (i)	NY Racing Team	Chevrolet	256	0
36	13	45	Tyler Reddick	23XI Racing	Toyota	237	2
37	35	33	Austin Hill (i)	Richard Childress Racing	Chevrolet	47	0
38	21	88	Connor Zilisch (R)	Trackhouse Racing	Chevrolet	1	1
Official race results

=== Race statistics ===
- Lead changes: 28 among 13 different drivers
- Cautions/Laps: 7 for 43 laps
- Red flags: 0
- Time of race: 3 hours, 9 minutes and 18 seconds
- Average speed: 126.941 miles per hour (204.292 km/h)

== Media ==
=== Television ===
TNT covered the race on the television side. Adam Alexander, Dale Earnhardt Jr. and Steve Letarte called the race from the broadcast booth. Marty Snider, Shannon Spake, Danielle Trotta and Mamba Smith handled pit road for the television side.

TNT
Booth announcers	Pit reporters
Lap-by-lap: Adam Alexander; Color-commentator: Dale Earnhardt Jr. Color-commentator: Steve Letarte	Marty Snider; Shannon Spake; Danielle Trotta; Mamba Smith

=== Radio ===
Radio coverage of the race was broadcast by Motor Racing Network (MRN) and simulcast on Sirius XM NASCAR Radio. Alex Hayden, Mike Bagley and former championship crew chief Todd Gordon called the race in the booth while the field raced on the front stretch. Kurt Becker and Tim Catafalmo called the race. Lead MRN pit reporter Steve Post, Chris Wilner and Jacklyn Drake were the pit reporters during the broadcast.

MRN
Booth announcers	Turn announcers	Pit reporters
Lead announcer: Alex Hayden; Announcer: Mike Bagley; Announcer: Todd Gordon	Turns 1 & 2: Dave Moody; Turns 3 & 4: Tim Catafalmo	Steve Post; Chris Wilner; Jacklyn Drake

== Standings after the race ==
Drivers' Championship standings

	Pos	Driver	Points
	1	Denny Hamlin	764
	2	Tyler Reddick	720 (–44)
	3	Ryan Blaney	651 (–113)
	4	Ty Gibbs	627 (–137)
1	5	Chase Elliott	584 (–180)
1	6	Kyle Larson	583 (–181)
	7	Chris Buescher	541 (–223)
3	8	Chase Briscoe	538 (–226)
1	9	Carson Hocevar	524 (–240)
	10	Christopher Bell	512 (–252)
2	11	Daniel Suárez	507 (–257)
	12	William Byron	499 (–265)
	13	Bubba Wallace	484 (–280)
	14	Shane van Gisbergen	437 (–327)
1	15	Austin Cindric	434 (–330)
1	16	Erik Jones	411 (–353)
Official driver's standings

Manufacturers' Championship standings

Pos	Manufacturer	Points
1	Toyota	892
2	Chevrolet	772 (–120)
3	Ford	622 (–270)

- Note: Only the first 16 positions are included for the driver standings.

=== NASCAR In-Season Challenge bracket ===
Sonoma
1	#45 Tyler Reddick	36th
32	#48 Alex Bowman	10th
16	#2 Austin Cindric	13th
17	#6 Brad Keselowski	15th
8	#7 Daniel Suárez	31st
25	#34 Todd Gilliland	29th
9	#77 Carson Hocevar	11th
24	#38 Zane Smith	18th
12	#19 Chase Briscoe	2nd
21	#16 A. J. Allmendinger	16th
5	#54 Ty Gibbs	3rd
28	#3 Austin Dillon	27th
13	#23 Bubba Wallace	22nd
20	#71 Michael McDowell	9th
4	#9 Chase Elliott	17th
29	#4 Noah Gragson	32nd
2	#11 Denny Hamlin	26th
31	#10 Ty Dillon	35th
15	#43 Erik Jones	23rd
18	#22 Joey Logano	24th
7	#17 Chris Buescher	19th
26	#42 John Hunter Nemechek	25th
10	#20 Christopher Bell	5th
23	#1 Ross Chastain	14th
11	#24 William Byron	12th
22	#47 Ricky Stenhouse Jr.	21st
6	#5 Kyle Larson	4th
27	#35 Riley Herbst	30th
14	#97 Shane van Gisbergen	1st
19	#60 Ryan Preece	8th
3	#12 Ryan Blaney	6th
30	#21 Josh Berry	28th

Chicagoland
32	#48 Bowman	5th
16	#2 Cindric	13th
25	#34 Gilliland	16th
9	#77 Hocevar	22nd
12	#19 Briscoe	1st
5	#54 Ty Gibbs	8th
20	#71 McDowell	29th
4	#9 Elliott	11th
2	#11 Hamlin	3rd
15	#43 Jones	15th
7	#17 Buescher	19th
10	#20 Bell	2nd
11	#24 Byron	4th
6	#5 Larson	34th
14	#97 van Gisbergen	25th
3	#12 Blaney	7th

Atlanta
32	#48 Bowman	22nd
25	#34 Gilliland	19th
12	#19 Briscoe	36th
4	#9 Elliott	13th
2	#11 Hamlin	12th
10	#20 Bell	2nd
11	#24 Byron	16th
3	#12 Blaney	1st

North Wilkesboro
25	#34 Gilliland	8th
4	#9 Elliott	17th
10	#20 Bell	19th
3	#12 Blaney	11th

Indianapolis
25	#34 Gilliland	24th
3	#12 Blaney	26th

Previous race: 2026 Toyota/Save Mart 350	NASCAR Cup Series; 2026 season	Next race: 2026 Quaker State 400
