= 2026 Toyota/Save Mart 350 =

NASCAR stock car race held in Sonoma, California, U.S.

Race details
- Race 18 of 36 in the 2026 NASCAR Cup Series
- Date: June 28, 2026
- Location: Sonoma Raceway in Sonoma, California
- Course: Permanent racing facility
- Course length: 1.99 miles (3.20 km)
- Distance: 110 laps, 218.9 mi (352.285 km)
- Average speed: 83.188 miles per hour (133.878 km/h)

Pole position
Driver	Ty Gibbs	Joe Gibbs Racing
- Time: 1:14.829

Most laps led
Driver	Shane van Gisbergen	Trackhouse Racing
- Laps: 74

Fastest lap
Driver	Tyler Reddick	23XI Racing
- Time: 1:15.761

Winner
No. 97	Shane van Gisbergen	Trackhouse Racing

Television in the United States
- Network: TNT
- Announcers: Adam Alexander, Dale Earnhardt Jr., and Steve Letarte
- Nielsen ratings: 1.8 million

Radio in the United States
- Radio: PRN
- Booth announcers: Brad Gillie and Nick Yeoman
- Turn announcers: Pat Patterson (2, 3, & 3a), Doug Turnbull (4a & 7a), and Michael Young (10 & 11)

The 2026 Toyota/Save Mart 350 was an NASCAR Cup Series race that was held on June 28, 2026, at Sonoma Raceway in Sonoma, California. Contested over 110 laps on the 1.99-mile (3.20 km) asphalt road course, it was the 18th race of the 2026 NASCAR Cup Series season, as well as the first race of the 2026 NASCAR In-Season Challenge.

Shane van Gisbergen won the race. Chase Briscoe finished 2nd, and Ty Gibbs finished 3rd. Kyle Larson and Christopher Bell rounded out the top five, and Ryan Blaney, Connor Zilisch, Ryan Preece, Michael McDowell, and Alex Bowman rounded out the top ten.

== Report ==
=== Background ===
Layout of Sonoma Raceway, the track where the race was held.

Sonoma Raceway is a 1.99-mile (3.20 km) road course and drag strip located on the landform known as Sears Point in the southern Sonoma Mountains in Sonoma, California, U.S. The road course features 12 turns on a hilly course with 160 feet (49 m) of total elevation change. It is host to one of only seven NASCAR Cup Series races each year that are run on road courses. It is also host to the NTT IndyCar Series and several other auto races and motorcycle races such as the American Federation of Motorcyclists series. Sonoma Raceway continues to host amateur, or club racing events which may or may not be open to the general public. The largest such car club is the Sports Car Club of America. In 2022, the race was reverted to racing the club configuration.

==== Entry list ====
- (R) denotes rookie driver.
- (i) denotes driver who is ineligible for series driver points.

No.	Driver	Team	Manufacturer
1	Ross Chastain	Trackhouse Racing	Chevrolet
2	Austin Cindric	Team Penske	Ford
3	Austin Dillon	Richard Childress Racing	Chevrolet
4	Noah Gragson	Front Row Motorsports	Ford
5	Kyle Larson	Hendrick Motorsports	Chevrolet
6	Brad Keselowski	RFK Racing	Ford
7	Daniel Suárez	Spire Motorsports	Chevrolet
9	Chase Elliott	Hendrick Motorsports	Chevrolet
10	Ty Dillon	Kaulig Racing	Chevrolet
11	Denny Hamlin	Joe Gibbs Racing	Toyota
12	Ryan Blaney	Team Penske	Ford
16	A. J. Allmendinger	Kaulig Racing	Chevrolet
17	Chris Buescher	RFK Racing	Ford
19	Chase Briscoe	Joe Gibbs Racing	Toyota
20	Christopher Bell	Joe Gibbs Racing	Toyota
21	Josh Berry	Wood Brothers Racing	Ford
22	Joey Logano	Team Penske	Ford
23	Bubba Wallace	23XI Racing	Toyota
24	William Byron	Hendrick Motorsports	Chevrolet
33	Austin Hill (i)	Richard Childress Racing	Chevrolet
34	Todd Gilliland	Front Row Motorsports	Ford
35	Riley Herbst	23XI Racing	Toyota
38	Zane Smith	Front Row Motorsports	Ford
41	Cole Custer	Haas Factory Team	Chevrolet
42	John Hunter Nemechek	Legacy Motor Club	Toyota
43	Erik Jones	Legacy Motor Club	Toyota
45	Tyler Reddick	23XI Racing	Toyota
47	Ricky Stenhouse Jr.	Hyak Motorsports	Chevrolet
48	Alex Bowman	Hendrick Motorsports	Chevrolet
51	Cody Ware	Rick Ware Racing	Chevrolet
54	Ty Gibbs	Joe Gibbs Racing	Toyota
60	Ryan Preece	RFK Racing	Ford
71	Michael McDowell	Spire Motorsports	Chevrolet
77	Carson Hocevar	Spire Motorsports	Chevrolet
88	Connor Zilisch (R)	Trackhouse Racing	Chevrolet
97	Shane van Gisbergen	Trackhouse Racing	Chevrolet
Official entry list

== Practice ==
Ryan Blaney was the fastest in the practice session with a time of 1:15.808 seconds and a speed of 94.502 mph (152.086 km/h).

=== Practice results ===
Pos	No.	Driver	Team	Manufacturer	Time	Speed
1	12	Ryan Blaney	Team Penske	Ford	1:15.808	94.502
2	5	Kyle Larson	Hendrick Motorsports	Chevrolet	1:15.924	94.358
3	45	Tyler Reddick	23XI Racing	Toyota	1:15.938	94.340
Official practice results

== Qualifying ==
Ty Gibbs scored the pole for the race with a time of 1:14.829 and a speed of 95.738 mph (154.075 km/h).

=== Qualifying results ===
Pos	No.	Driver	Team	Manufacturer	Time	Speed
1	54	Ty Gibbs	Joe Gibbs Racing	Toyota	1:14.829	95.738
2	77	Carson Hocevar	Spire Motorsports	Chevrolet	1:14.854	95.706
3	5	Kyle Larson	Hendrick Motorsports	Chevrolet	1:14.870	95.686
4	71	Michael McDowell	Spire Motorsports	Chevrolet	1:14.877	95.677
5	1	Ross Chastain	Trackhouse Racing	Chevrolet	1:14.913	95.631
6	97	Shane van Gisbergen	Trackhouse Racing	Chevrolet	1:14.914	95.630
7	19	Chase Briscoe	Joe Gibbs Racing	Toyota	1:14.984	95.540
8	16	A. J. Allmendinger	Kaulig Racing	Chevrolet	1:15.045	95.463
9	11	Denny Hamlin	Joe Gibbs Racing	Toyota	1:15.052	95.454
10	22	Joey Logano	Team Penske	Ford	1:15.085	95.412
11	45	Tyler Reddick	23XI Racing	Toyota	1:15.100	95.393
12	33	Austin Hill (i)	Richard Childress Racing	Chevrolet	1:15.192	95.276
13	24	William Byron	Hendrick Motorsports	Chevrolet	1:15.359	95.065
14	20	Christopher Bell	Joe Gibbs Racing	Toyota	1:15.366	95.056
15	17	Chris Buescher	RFK Racing	Ford	1:15.384	95.033
16	12	Ryan Blaney	Team Penske	Ford	1:15.391	95.025
17	88	Connor Zilisch (R)	Trackhouse Racing	Chevrolet	1:15.414	94.996
18	9	Chase Elliott	Hendrick Motorsports	Chevrolet	1:15.541	94.836
19	60	Ryan Preece	RFK Racing	Ford	1:15.628	94.727
20	42	John Hunter Nemechek	Legacy Motor Club	Toyota	1:15.640	94.712
21	7	Daniel Suárez	Spire Motorsports	Chevrolet	1:15.737	94.590
22	48	Alex Bowman	Hendrick Motorsports	Chevrolet	1:15.832	94.472
23	2	Austin Cindric	Team Penske	Ford	1:15.838	94.465
24	38	Zane Smith	Front Row Motorsports	Ford	1:15.848	94.452
25	35	Riley Herbst	23XI Racing	Toyota	1:15.878	94.415
26	23	Bubba Wallace	23XI Racing	Toyota	1:15.887	94.404
27	41	Cole Custer	Haas Factory Team	Chevrolet	1:15.923	94.359
28	21	Josh Berry	Wood Brothers Racing	Ford	1:15.958	94.315
29	34	Todd Gilliland	Front Row Motorsports	Ford	1:16.080	94.164
30	3	Austin Dillon	Richard Childress Racing	Chevrolet	1:16.129	94.103
31	10	Ty Dillon	Kaulig Racing	Chevrolet	1:16.292	93.902
32	43	Erik Jones	Legacy Motor Club	Toyota	1:16.303	93.889
33	47	Ricky Stenhouse Jr.	Hyak Motorsports	Chevrolet	1:16.534	93.605
34	4	Noah Gragson	Rick Ware Racing	Ford	1:16.605	93.519
35	6	Brad Keselowski	RFK Racing	Ford	1:16.631	93.487
36	51	Cody Ware	Rick Ware Racing	Chevrolet	1:17.439	92.512
Official qualifying results

== Race ==
=== Race results ===
==== Stage Results ====
Stage One Laps: 25

Pos	No	Driver	Team	Manufacturer	Points
1	54	Ty Gibbs	Joe Gibbs Racing	Toyota	10
2	20	Christopher Bell	Joe Gibbs Racing	Toyota	9
3	71	Michael McDowell	Spire Motorsports	Chevrolet	8
4	77	Carson Hocevar	Spire Motorsports	Chevrolet	7
5	60	Ryan Preece	RFK Racing	Ford	6
6	48	Alex Bowman	Hendrick Motorsports	Chevrolet	5
7	97	Shane van Gisbergen	Trackhouse Racing	Chevrolet	4
8	43	Erik Jones	Legacy Motor Club	Toyota	3
9	5	Kyle Larson	Hendrick Motorsports	Chevrolet	2
10	35	Riley Herbst	23XI Racing	Toyota	1

Stage Two Laps: 30

Pos	No	Driver	Team	Manufacturer	Points
1	54	Ty Gibbs	Joe Gibbs Racing	Toyota	10
2	20	Christopher Bell	Joe Gibbs Racing	Toyota	9
3	16	A. J. Allmendinger	Kaulig Racing	Chevrolet	8
4	2	Austin Cindric	Team Penske	Ford	7
5	1	Ross Chastain	Trackhouse Racing	Chevrolet	6
6	38	Zane Smith	Front Row Motorsports	Ford	5
7	97	Shane van Gisbergen	Trackhouse Racing	Chevrolet	4
8	88	Connor Zilisch (R)	Trackhouse Racing	Chevrolet	3
9	19	Chase Briscoe	Joe Gibbs Racing	Toyota	2
10	12	Ryan Blaney	Team Penske	Ford	1

=== Final Stage Results ===
Stage Three Laps: 55

Pos	Grid	No	Driver	Team	Manufacturer	Laps	Points
1	6	97	Shane van Gisbergen	Trackhouse Racing	Chevrolet	110	63
2	7	19	Chase Briscoe	Joe Gibbs Racing	Toyota	110	37
3	1	54	Ty Gibbs	Joe Gibbs Racing	Toyota	110	54
4	3	5	Kyle Larson	Hendrick Motorsports	Chevrolet	110	35
5	14	20	Christopher Bell	Joe Gibbs Racing	Toyota	110	50
6	16	12	Ryan Blaney	Team Penske	Ford	110	32
7	17	88	Connor Zilisch (R)	Trackhouse Racing	Chevrolet	110	33
8	19	60	Ryan Preece	RFK Racing	Ford	110	35
9	4	71	Michael McDowell	Spire Motorsports	Chevrolet	110	36
10	22	48	Alex Bowman	Hendrick Motorsports	Chevrolet	110	32
11	2	77	Carson Hocevar	Spire Motorsports	Chevrolet	110	33
12	13	24	William Byron	Hendrick Motorsports	Chevrolet	110	25
13	23	2	Austin Cindric	Team Penske	Ford	110	31
14	5	1	Ross Chastain	Trackhouse Racing	Chevrolet	110	29
15	35	6	Brad Keselowski	RFK Racing	Ford	110	22
16	8	16	A. J. Allmendinger	Kaulig Racing	Chevrolet	110	29
17	18	9	Chase Elliott	Hendrick Motorsports	Chevrolet	110	20
18	24	38	Zane Smith	Front Row Motorsports	Ford	110	24
19	15	17	Chris Buescher	RFK Racing	Ford	110	18
20	27	41	Cole Custer	Haas Factory Team	Chevrolet	110	17
21	33	47	Ricky Stenhouse Jr.	Hyak Motorsports	Chevrolet	110	16
22	26	23	Bubba Wallace	23XI Racing	Toyota	110	15
23	32	43	Erik Jones	Legacy Motor Club	Toyota	110	17
24	10	22	Joey Logano	Team Penske	Ford	110	13
25	20	42	John Hunter Nemechek	Legacy Motor Club	Toyota	110	12
26	9	11	Denny Hamlin	Joe Gibbs Racing	Toyota	110	11
27	30	3	Austin Dillon	Richard Childress Racing	Chevrolet	110	10
28	28	21	Josh Berry	Wood Brothers Racing	Ford	110	9
29	29	34	Todd Gilliland	Front Row Motorsports	Ford	110	8
30	25	35	Riley Herbst	23XI Racing	Toyota	110	8
31	21	7	Daniel Suárez	Spire Motorsports	Chevrolet	110	6
32	34	4	Noah Gragson	Front Row Motorsports	Ford	110	5
33	36	51	Cody Ware	Rick Ware Racing	Chevrolet	109	4
34	12	33	Austin Hill (i)	Richard Childress Racing	Chevrolet	109	0
35	31	10	Ty Dillon	Kaulig Racing	Chevrolet	109	2
36	11	45	Tyler Reddick	23XI Racing	Toyota	106	2
Official race results

=== Race statistics ===
- Lead changes: 8 among 6 different drivers
- Cautions/Laps: 3 for 8 laps
- Red flags: 0
- Time of race: 2 hours, 37 minutes and 53 seconds
- Average speed: 83.188 miles per hour (133.878 km/h)

== Media ==
=== Television ===
TNT covered the race on the television side. Adam Alexander, Dale Earnhardt Jr. and Steve Letarte called the race from the broadcast booth. Marty Snider, Shannon Spake, Danielle Trotta and Mamba Smith handled pit road for the television side.

TNT
Booth announcers	Pit reporters
Lap-by-lap: Adam Alexander; Color-commentator: Dale Earnhardt Jr. Color-commentator: Steve Letarte	Marty Snider; Shannon Spake; Danielle Trotta; Mamba Smith

=== Radio ===
The race was broadcast on radio by the Performance Racing Network and simulcast on Sirius XM NASCAR Radio. Brad Gillie and Nick Yeoman called the race in the booth while the field was racing on the pit straightaway. Pat Patterson called the race from a stand outside of turn 2 when the field was racing up turns 2, 3 and 3a. Doug Turnbull called the race from a stand outside of turn 7a when the field was racing through turns 4a and 7a. Michael Young called the race from a billboard outside turn 11 when the field was racing through turns 10 and 11. Andrew Kurland, Heather DeBeaux and Wendy Venturini reported from pit lane during the race.

PRN
Booth announcers	Turn announcers	Pit reporters
Lead announcer: Brad Gillie; Announcer: Nick Yeoman	Turns 2, 3 & 3a: Pat Patterson; Turns 4a & 7a: Doug Turnbull; Turns 10 & 11: Michael Young	Andrew Kurland; Heather DeBeaux; Wendy Venturini

== Standings after the race ==
Drivers' Championship standings

	Pos	Driver	Points
1	1	Denny Hamlin	719
1	2	Tyler Reddick	718 (–1)
	3	Ryan Blaney	615 (–104)
1	4	Ty Gibbs	589 (–130)
1	5	Kyle Larson	571 (–148)
	6	Chase Elliott	554 (–165)
	7	Chris Buescher	518 (–201)
1	8	Carson Hocevar	509 (–210)
1	9	Daniel Suárez	484 (–235)
2	10	Christopher Bell	472 (–247)
1	11	Chase Briscoe	468 (–251)
1	12	William Byron	446 (–273)
2	13	Bubba Wallace	444 (–275)
3	14	Shane van Gisbergen	425 (–294)
1	15	Ryan Preece	402 (–317)
1	16	Austin Cindric	401 (–318)
Official driver's standings

Manufacturers' Championship standings

Pos	Manufacturer	Points
1	Toyota	837
2	Chevrolet	739 (–98)
3	Ford	592 (–245)

- Note: Only the first 16 positions are included for the driver standings.

=== NASCAR In-Season Challenge bracket ===
Sonoma
1	#45 Tyler Reddick	36th
32	#48 Alex Bowman	10th
16	#2 Austin Cindric	13th
17	#6 Brad Keselowski	15th
8	#7 Daniel Suárez	31st
25	#34 Todd Gilliland	29th
9	#77 Carson Hocevar	11th
24	#38 Zane Smith	18th
12	#19 Chase Briscoe	2nd
21	#16 A. J. Allmendinger	16th
5	#54 Ty Gibbs	3rd
28	#3 Austin Dillon	27th
13	#23 Bubba Wallace	22nd
20	#71 Michael McDowell	9th
4	#9 Chase Elliott	17th
29	#4 Noah Gragson	32nd
2	#11 Denny Hamlin	26th
31	#10 Ty Dillon	35th
15	#43 Erik Jones	23rd
18	#22 Joey Logano	24th
7	#17 Chris Buescher	19th
26	#42 John Hunter Nemechek	25th
10	#20 Christopher Bell	5th
23	#1 Ross Chastain	14th
11	#24 William Byron	12th
22	#47 Ricky Stenhouse Jr.	21st
6	#5 Kyle Larson	4th
27	#35 Riley Herbst	30th
14	#97 Shane van Gisbergen	1st
19	#60 Ryan Preece	8th
3	#12 Ryan Blaney	6th
30	#21 Josh Berry	28th

Chicagoland
32	#48 Bowman	5th
16	#2 Cindric	13th
25	#34 Gilliland	16th
9	#77 Hocevar	22nd
12	#19 Briscoe	1st
5	#54 Ty Gibbs	8th
20	#71 McDowell	29th
4	#9 Elliott	11th
2	#11 Hamlin	3rd
15	#43 Jones	15th
7	#17 Buescher	19th
10	#20 Bell	2nd
11	#24 Byron	4th
6	#5 Larson	34th
14	#97 van Gisbergen	25th
3	#12 Blaney	7th

Atlanta
32	#48 Bowman	22nd
25	#34 Gilliland	19th
12	#19 Briscoe	36th
4	#9 Elliott	13th
2	#11 Hamlin	12th
10	#20 Bell	2nd
11	#24 Byron	16th
3	#12 Blaney	1st

North Wilkesboro
25	#34 Gilliland	8th
4	#9 Elliott	17th
10	#20 Bell	19th
3	#12 Blaney	11th

Indianapolis
25	#34 Gilliland	24th
3	#12 Blaney	26th

Previous race: 2026 Anduril 250	NASCAR Cup Series; 2026 season	Next race: 2026 eero 400
