= 2025 Viva México 250 =

NASCAR Cup Series race

Race details
- Race 16 of 36 in the 2025 NASCAR Cup Series
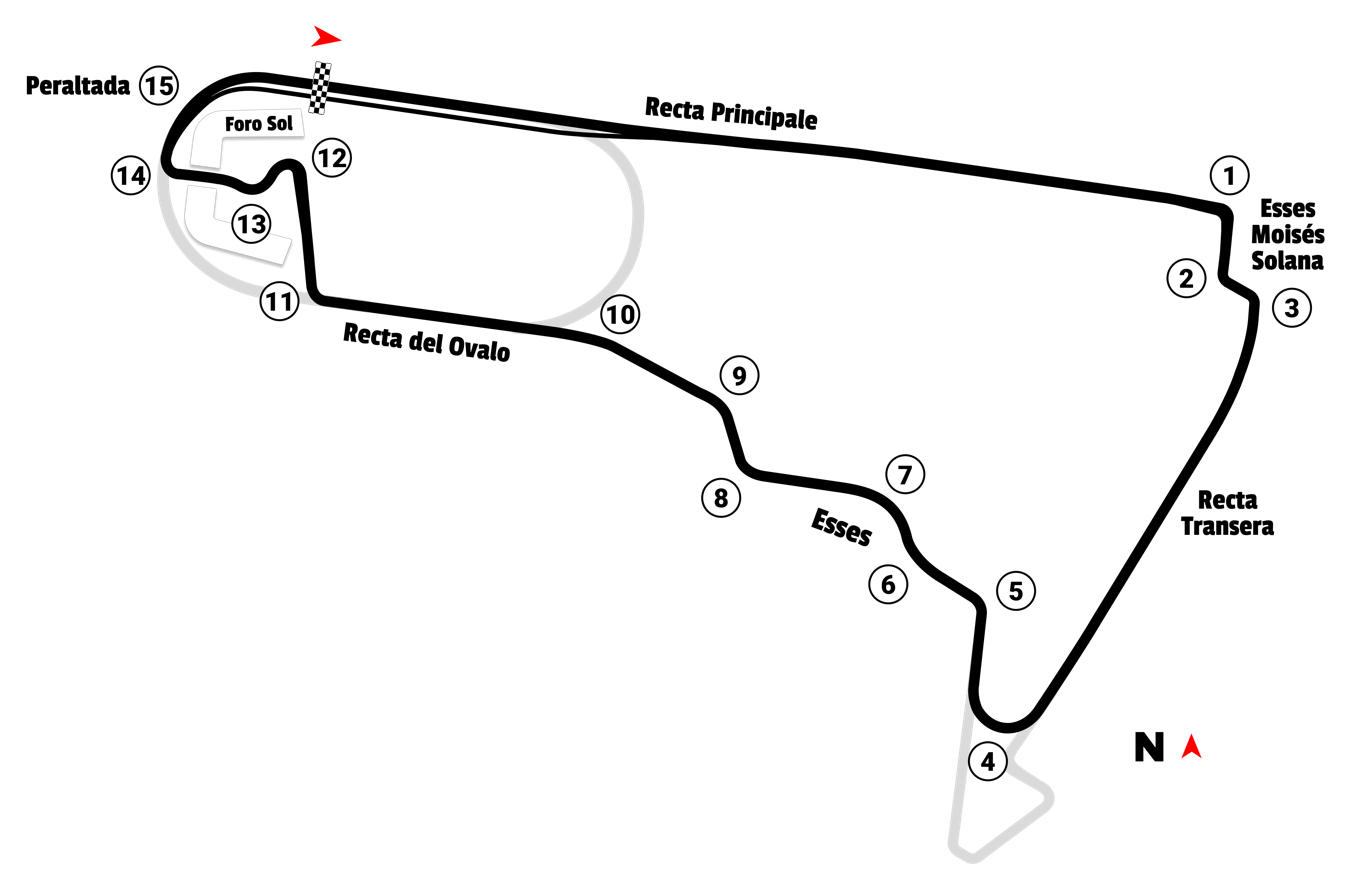
- Track map of Autódromo Hermanos Rodríguez.
- Date: June 15, 2025
- Location: Autódromo Hermanos Rodríguez in Mexico City, Mexico
- Course: Permanent racing facility
- Course length: 2.417 miles (3.890 km)
- Distance: 100 laps, 241.7 mi (389.0 km)
- Weather: Cloudy and rainy with a temperature around 60 °F (16 °C); wind out of the south at 2 miles per hour (3.2 km/h).
- Average speed: 74.82 miles per hour (120.41 km/h)

Pole position
| Driver | Shane van Gisbergen | Trackhouse Racing |
- Time: 1:32.776

Most laps led
| Driver | Shane van Gisbergen | Trackhouse Racing |
- Laps: 59

Fastest lap
| Driver | Kyle Larson | Hendrick Motorsports |
- Time: 1:33.782

Winner
| No. 88 | Shane van Gisbergen | Trackhouse Racing |

Television in the United States
- Network: Prime Video
- Announcers: Adam Alexander, Dale Earnhardt Jr., and Steve Letarte
- Nielsen ratings: 2.10 million

Radio in the United States
- Radio: MRN
- Booth announcers: Alex Hayden and Mike Bagley
- Turn announcers: Dave Moody (Turns 1 & 2), Kurt Becker (Turns 3 & 4), Dan Hubbard (Turns 5–7), Tim Catafalmo (Turns 8–10), and Chris Wilner (Turns 11–15)

The 2025 Viva México 250 was a NASCAR Cup Series race held on June 15, 2025, at Autódromo Hermanos Rodríguez in Mexico City, Mexico. Contested over 100 laps on the 2.429-mile (3.909 km) road course, it was the 16th race of the 2025 NASCAR Cup Series season and the second seeding race for the inaugural NASCAR In-Season Challenge.

Shane van Gisbergen won the race, his first win since the 2023 Grant Park 220. Christopher Bell finished 2nd, and Chase Elliott finished 3rd. Alex Bowman and Michael McDowell rounded out the top five, and John Hunter Nemechek, Chase Briscoe, Cole Custer, William Byron, and Chris Buescher rounded out the top ten.

== Report ==
=== Background ===
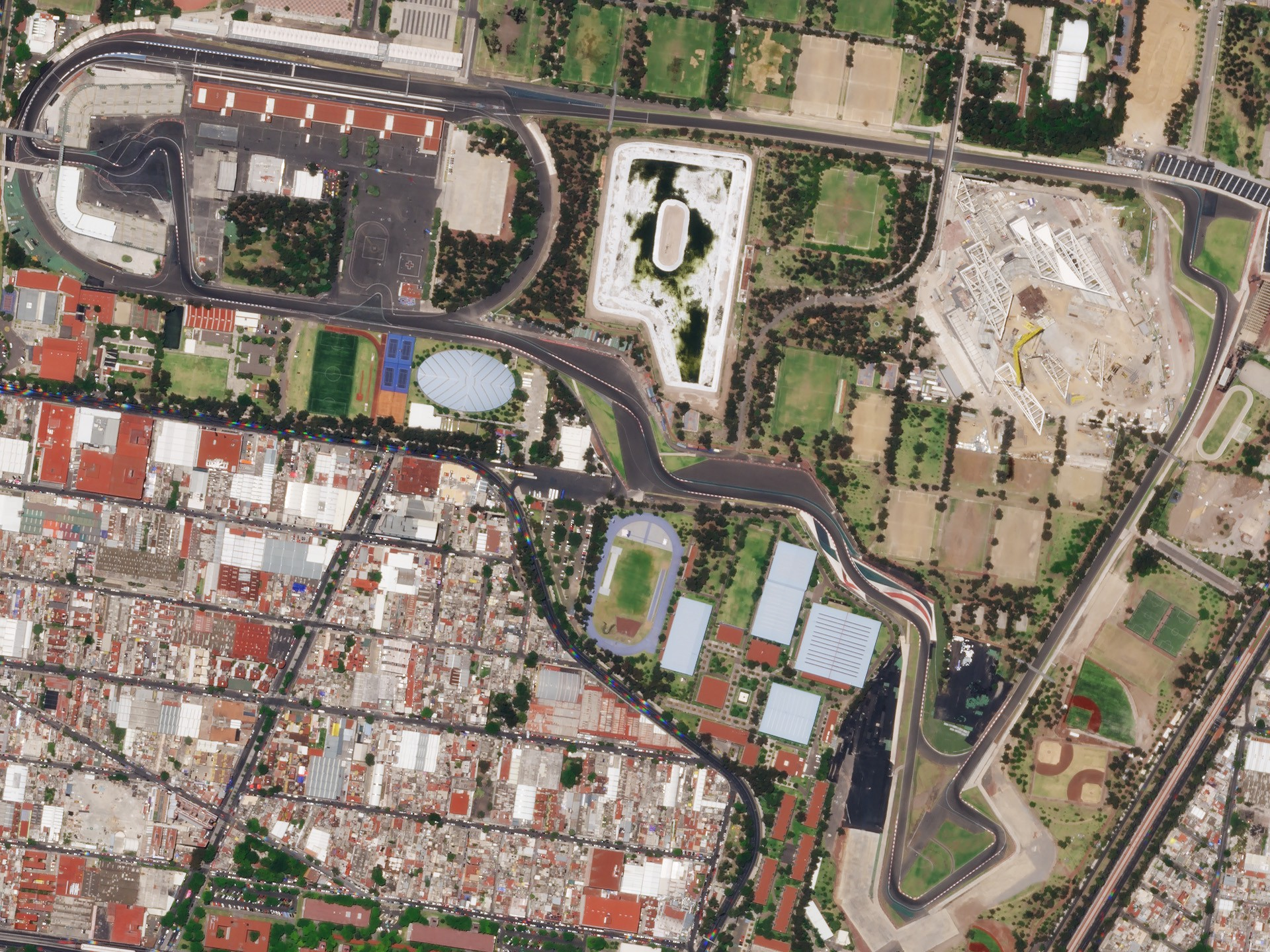
Autódromo Hermanos Rodríguez, the track where the race was held.

The race is held at Autódromo Hermanos Rodríguez, a road course in Mexico City. The track was built in 1959, and previously held the NASCAR Xfinity Series from 2005 to 2008. The track sits 7,500 feet above sea level, making it the highest altitude track on the NASCAR calendar. On August 27, 2024, it was announced that the track would host both the NASCAR Cup Series and the Xfinity Series, marking the first time the Cup Series went outside the United States since 1958.

==== Entry list ====
- (R) denotes rookie driver.
- (i) denotes driver who is ineligible for series driver points.

| No. | Driver | Team | Manufacturer |
|---|---|---|---|
| 1 | Ross Chastain | Trackhouse Racing | Chevrolet |
| 2 | Austin Cindric | Team Penske | Ford |
| 3 | Austin Dillon | Richard Childress Racing | Chevrolet |
| 4 | Noah Gragson | Front Row Motorsports | Ford |
| 5 | Kyle Larson | Hendrick Motorsports | Chevrolet |
| 6 | Brad Keselowski | RFK Racing | Ford |
| 7 | Justin Haley | Spire Motorsports | Chevrolet |
| 8 | Kyle Busch | Richard Childress Racing | Chevrolet |
| 9 | Chase Elliott | Hendrick Motorsports | Chevrolet |
| 10 | Ty Dillon | Kaulig Racing | Chevrolet |
| 11 | Ryan Truex (i) (Note: On June 12, Joe Gibbs Racing announced Denny Hamlin, the original driver, was put on paternity leave, missing his first race since the 2014 Auto Club 400 following the birth of his fiancée's third child. Ryan Truex drove the No. 11 Toyota as his replacement.) | Joe Gibbs Racing | Toyota |
| 12 | Ryan Blaney | Team Penske | Ford |
| 16 | A. J. Allmendinger | Kaulig Racing | Chevrolet |
| 17 | Chris Buescher | RFK Racing | Ford |
| 19 | Chase Briscoe | Joe Gibbs Racing | Toyota |
| 20 | Christopher Bell | Joe Gibbs Racing | Toyota |
| 21 | Josh Berry | Wood Brothers Racing | Ford |
| 22 | Joey Logano | Team Penske | Ford |
| 23 | Bubba Wallace | 23XI Racing | Toyota |
| 24 | William Byron | Hendrick Motorsports | Chevrolet |
| 34 | Todd Gilliland | Front Row Motorsports | Ford |
| 35 | Riley Herbst (R) | 23XI Racing | Toyota |
| 38 | Zane Smith | Front Row Motorsports | Ford |
| 41 | Cole Custer | Haas Factory Team | Ford |
| 42 | John Hunter Nemechek | Legacy Motor Club | Toyota |
| 43 | Erik Jones | Legacy Motor Club | Toyota |
| 45 | Tyler Reddick | 23XI Racing | Toyota |
| 47 | Ricky Stenhouse Jr. | Hyak Motorsports | Chevrolet |
| 48 | Alex Bowman | Hendrick Motorsports | Chevrolet |
| 51 | Cody Ware | Rick Ware Racing | Ford |
| 54 | Ty Gibbs | Joe Gibbs Racing | Toyota |
| 60 | Ryan Preece | RFK Racing | Ford |
| 71 | Michael McDowell | Spire Motorsports | Chevrolet |
| 77 | Carson Hocevar | Spire Motorsports | Chevrolet |
| 78 | Katherine Legge | Live Fast Motorsports | Chevrolet |
| 88 | Shane van Gisbergen (R) | Trackhouse Racing | Chevrolet |
| 99 | Daniel Suárez | Trackhouse Racing | Chevrolet |
Official entry list

== Practice ==
=== First practice ===
Michael McDowell was the fastest in the session with a time of 94.024 seconds and a speed of 92.657 mph (149.117 km/h).

| Pos | No. | Driver | Team | Manufacturer | Time | Speed |
|---|---|---|---|---|---|---|
| 1 | 71 | Michael McDowell | Spire Motorsports | Chevrolet | 94.024 | 92.657 |
| 2 | 19 | Chase Briscoe | Joe Gibbs Racing | Toyota | 94.136 | 92.547 |
| 3 | 54 | Ty Gibbs | Joe Gibbs Racing | Toyota | 94.141 | 92.542 |
Official first practice results

=== Final practice ===
Todd Gilliland was the fastest in the session with a time of 93.496 seconds and a speed of 93.181 mph (149.960 km/h).

| Pos | No. | Driver | Team | Manufacturer | Time | Speed |
|---|---|---|---|---|---|---|
| 1 | 34 | Todd Gilliland | Front Row Motorsports | Ford | 93.496 | 93.181 |
| 2 | 1 | Ross Chastain | Trackhouse Racing | Chevrolet | 93.636 | 93.041 |
| 3 | 54 | Ty Gibbs | Joe Gibbs Racing | Toyota | 93.814 | 92.865 |
Official final practice results

== Qualifying ==
Shane van Gisbergen scored the pole for the race with a time of 1:32.776 and a speed of 93.904 mph (151.124 km/h).

=== Qualifying results ===
| Pos | No. | Driver | Team | Manufacturer | Time | Speed |
|---|---|---|---|---|---|---|
| 1 | 88 | Shane van Gisbergen (R) | Trackhouse Racing | Chevrolet | 1:32.776 | 93.904 |
| 2 | 60 | Ryan Preece | RFK Racing | Ford | 1:32.840 | 93.839 |
| 3 | 1 | Ross Chastain | Trackhouse Racing | Chevrolet | 1:32.849 | 93.830 |
| 4 | 54 | Ty Gibbs | Joe Gibbs Racing | Toyota | 1:32.921 | 93.757 |
| 5 | 71 | Michael McDowell | Spire Motorsports | Chevrolet | 1:32.974 | 93.704 |
| 6 | 5 | Kyle Larson | Hendrick Motorsports | Chevrolet | 1:32.984 | 93.694 |
| 7 | 34 | Todd Gilliland | Front Row Motorsports | Ford | 1:33.020 | 93.657 |
| 8 | 16 | A. J. Allmendinger | Kaulig Racing | Chevrolet | 1:33.022 | 93.655 |
| 9 | 22 | Joey Logano | Team Penske | Ford | 1:33.049 | 93.628 |
| 10 | 99 | Daniel Suárez | Trackhouse Racing | Chevrolet | 1:33.061 | 93.616 |
| 11 | 8 | Kyle Busch | Richard Childress Racing | Chevrolet | 1:33.084 | 93.593 |
| 12 | 9 | Chase Elliott | Hendrick Motorsports | Chevrolet | 1:33.108 | 93.569 |
| 13 | 21 | Josh Berry | Wood Brothers Racing | Ford | 1:33.158 | 93.519 |
| 14 | 43 | Erik Jones | Legacy Motor Club | Toyota | 1:33.194 | 93.482 |
| 15 | 35 | Riley Herbst (R) | 23XI Racing | Toyota | 1:33.201 | 93.475 |
| 16 | 17 | Chris Buescher | RFK Racing | Ford | 1:33.206 | 93.470 |
| 17 | 7 | Justin Haley | Spire Motorsports | Chevrolet | 1:33.234 | 93.442 |
| 18 | 12 | Ryan Blaney | Team Penske | Ford | 1:33.247 | 93.429 |
| 19 | 19 | Chase Briscoe | Joe Gibbs Racing | Toyota | 1:33.257 | 93.419 |
| 20 | 2 | Austin Cindric | Team Penske | Ford | 1:33.319 | 93.357 |
| 21 | 3 | Austin Dillon | Richard Childress Racing | Chevrolet | 1:33.342 | 93.334 |
| 22 | 45 | Tyler Reddick | 23XI Racing | Toyota | 1:33.345 | 93.331 |
| 23 | 77 | Carson Hocevar | Spire Motorsports | Chevrolet | 1:33.351 | 93.325 |
| 24 | 38 | Zane Smith | Front Row Motorsports | Ford | 1:33.365 | 93.311 |
| 25 | 23 | Bubba Wallace | 23XI Racing | Toyota | 1:33.426 | 93.250 |
| 26 | 41 | Cole Custer | Haas Factory Team | Ford | 1:33.428 | 93.248 |
| 27 | 24 | William Byron | Hendrick Motorsports | Chevrolet | 1:33.458 | 93.218 |
| 28 | 10 | Ty Dillon | Kaulig Racing | Chevrolet | 1:33.595 | 93.082 |
| 29 | 48 | Alex Bowman | Hendrick Motorsports | Chevrolet | 1:33.604 | 93.073 |
| 30 | 6 | Brad Keselowski | RFK Racing | Ford | 1:33.707 | 92.971 |
| 31 | 20 | Christopher Bell | Joe Gibbs Racing | Toyota | 1:33.720 | 92.958 |
| 32 | 42 | John Hunter Nemechek | Legacy Motor Club | Toyota | 1:34.058 | 92.624 |
| 33 | 47 | Ricky Stenhouse Jr. | Hyak Motorsports | Chevrolet | 1:34.152 | 92.531 |
| 34 | 51 | Cody Ware | Rick Ware Racing | Ford | 1:34.213 | 92.471 |
| 35 | 4 | Noah Gragson | Front Row Motorsports | Ford | 1:34.416 | 92.272 |
| 36 | 11 | Ryan Truex (i) | Joe Gibbs Racing | Toyota | 1:34.624 | 92.070 |
| 37 | 78 | Katherine Legge | Live Fast Motorsports | Chevrolet | 1:35.468 | 91.256 |
Official qualifying results

== Race ==
=== Race results ===
==== Stage results ====
Stage One Laps: 20

| Pos | No | Driver | Team | Manufacturer | Points |
|---|---|---|---|---|---|
| 1 | 60 | Ryan Preece | RFK Racing | Ford | 10 |
| 2 | 12 | Ryan Blaney | Team Penske | Ford | 9 |
| 3 | 1 | Ross Chastain | Trackhouse Racing | Chevrolet | 8 |
| 4 | 71 | Michael McDowell | Spire Motorsports | Chevrolet | 7 |
| 5 | 34 | Todd Gilliland | Front Row Motorsports | Ford | 6 |
| 6 | 43 | Erik Jones | Legacy Motor Club | Toyota | 5 |
| 7 | 77 | Carson Hocevar | Spire Motorsports | Chevrolet | 4 |
| 8 | 23 | Bubba Wallace | 23XI Racing | Toyota | 3 |
| 9 | 9 | Chase Elliott | Hendrick Motorsports | Chevrolet | 2 |
| 10 | 99 | Daniel Suárez | Trackhouse Racing | Chevrolet | 1 |
Official stage one results

Stage Two Laps: 25

| Pos | No | Driver | Team | Manufacturer | Points |
|---|---|---|---|---|---|
| 1 | 88 | Shane van Gisbergen (R) | Trackhouse Racing | Chevrolet | 10 |
| 2 | 20 | Christopher Bell | Joe Gibbs Racing | Toyota | 9 |
| 3 | 48 | Alex Bowman | Hendrick Motorsports | Chevrolet | 8 |
| 4 | 12 | Ryan Blaney | Team Penske | Ford | 7 |
| 5 | 71 | Michael McDowell | Spire Motorsports | Chevrolet | 6 |
| 6 | 3 | Austin Dillon | Richard Childress Racing | Chevrolet | 5 |
| 7 | 17 | Chris Buescher | RFK Racing | Ford | 4 |
| 8 | 35 | Riley Herbst (R) | 23XI Racing | Toyota | 3 |
| 9 | 77 | Carson Hocevar | Spire Motorsports | Chevrolet | 2 |
| 10 | 99 | Daniel Suárez | Trackhouse Racing | Chevrolet | 1 |
Official stage two results

=== Final Stage results ===
Stage Three Laps: 55

| Pos | Grid | No | Driver | Team | Manufacturer | Laps | Points |
|---|---|---|---|---|---|---|---|
| 1 | 1 | 88 | Shane van Gisbergen (R) | Trackhouse Racing | Chevrolet | 100 | 50 |
| 2 | 31 | 20 | Christopher Bell | Joe Gibbs Racing | Toyota | 100 | 44 |
| 3 | 12 | 9 | Chase Elliott | Hendrick Motorsports | Chevrolet | 100 | 36 |
| 4 | 29 | 48 | Alex Bowman | Hendrick Motorsports | Chevrolet | 100 | 41 |
| 5 | 5 | 71 | Michael McDowell | Spire Motorsports | Chevrolet | 100 | 45 |
| 6 | 32 | 42 | John Hunter Nemechek | Legacy Motor Club | Toyota | 100 | 31 |
| 7 | 19 | 19 | Chase Briscoe | Joe Gibbs Racing | Toyota | 100 | 30 |
| 8 | 26 | 41 | Cole Custer | Haas Factory Team | Ford | 100 | 29 |
| 9 | 27 | 24 | William Byron | Hendrick Motorsports | Chevrolet | 100 | 28 |
| 10 | 16 | 17 | Chris Buescher | RFK Racing | Ford | 100 | 31 |
| 11 | 4 | 54 | Ty Gibbs | Joe Gibbs Racing | Toyota | 100 | 26 |
| 12 | 25 | 23 | Bubba Wallace | 23XI Racing | Toyota | 100 | 28 |
| 13 | 8 | 16 | A. J. Allmendinger | Kaulig Racing | Chevrolet | 100 | 24 |
| 14 | 18 | 12 | Ryan Blaney | Team Penske | Ford | 100 | 39 |
| 15 | 2 | 60 | Ryan Preece | RFK Racing | Ford | 100 | 32 |
| 16 | 3 | 1 | Ross Chastain | Trackhouse Racing | Chevrolet | 100 | 29 |
| 17 | 14 | 43 | Erik Jones | Legacy Motor Club | Toyota | 100 | 25 |
| 18 | 20 | 2 | Austin Cindric | Team Penske | Ford | 100 | 19 |
| 19 | 10 | 99 | Daniel Suárez | Trackhouse Racing | Chevrolet | 100 | 20 |
| 20 | 22 | 45 | Tyler Reddick | 23XI Racing | Toyota | 100 | 17 |
| 21 | 9 | 22 | Joey Logano | Team Penske | Ford | 100 | 16 |
| 22 | 7 | 34 | Todd Gilliland | Front Row Motorsports | Ford | 100 | 21 |
| 23 | 36 | 11 | Ryan Truex (i) | Joe Gibbs Racing | Toyota | 100 | 0 |
| 24 | 17 | 7 | Justin Haley | Spire Motorsports | Chevrolet | 100 | 13 |
| 25 | 30 | 6 | Brad Keselowski | RFK Racing | Ford | 100 | 12 |
| 26 | 13 | 21 | Josh Berry | Wood Brothers Racing | Ford | 100 | 11 |
| 27 | 33 | 47 | Ricky Stenhouse Jr. | Hyak Motorsports | Chevrolet | 100 | 10 |
| 28 | 21 | 3 | Austin Dillon | Richard Childress Racing | Chevrolet | 100 | 14 |
| 29 | 15 | 35 | Riley Herbst (R) | 23XI Racing | Toyota | 100 | 11 |
| 30 | 35 | 4 | Noah Gragson | Front Row Motorsports | Ford | 100 | 7 |
| 31 | 34 | 51 | Cody Ware | Rick Ware Racing | Ford | 100 | 6 |
| 32 | 37 | 78 | Katherine Legge | Live Fast Motorsports | Chevrolet | 99 | 5 |
| 33 | 28 | 10 | Ty Dillon | Kaulig Racing | Chevrolet | 99 | 4 |
| 34 | 23 | 77 | Carson Hocevar | Spire Motorsports | Chevrolet | 99 | 9 |
| 35 | 24 | 38 | Zane Smith | Front Row Motorsports | Ford | 76 | 2 |
| 36 | 6 | 5 | Kyle Larson | Hendrick Motorsports | Chevrolet | 58 | 2 |
| 37 | 11 | 8 | Kyle Busch | Richard Childress Racing | Chevrolet | 5 | 1 |
Official race results

=== Race statistics ===
- Lead changes: 14 among 8 different drivers
- Cautions/Laps: 6 for 16
- Red flags: 0
- Time of race: 3 hours, 14 minutes, and 4 seconds
- Average speed: 74.82 miles per hour (120.41 km/h)

== Media ==
=== Television ===
Prime Video covered the race on the television side. Adam Alexander, Dale Earnhardt Jr. and Steve Letarte called the race from the broadcast booth. Kim Coon, Marty Snider, and Trevor Bayne handled pit road for the television side. Canal 5 aired the race for free in Mexico. With Tony Rivera and Sam Reyes on the commentary.

Prime Video
| Booth announcers | Pit reporters |
|---|---|
| Lap-by-lap: Adam Alexander; Color-commentator: Dale Earnhardt Jr. Color-commentator: Steve Letarte | Kim Coon; Marty Snider; Trevor Bayne |

=== Radio ===
Radio coverage of the race was broadcast by Motor Racing Network (MRN) and simulcast on Sirius XM NASCAR Radio.

MRN
| Booth announcers | Turn announcers | Pit reporters |
|---|---|---|
| Lead announcer: Alex Hayden; Announcer: Mike Bagley | Turns 1 & 2: Dave Moody; Turns 3 & 4: Kurt Becker; Turns 5–7: Dan Hubbard; Turns 8–10: Tim Catafalmo; Turns 11–15: Chris Wilner | Steve Post; Brad Gillie |

== Standings after the race ==
Drivers' Championship standings

| | Pos | Driver | Points |
|---|---|---|---|
| | 1 | William Byron | 604 |
| | 2 | Kyle Larson | 537 (–67) |
| 1 | 3 | Christopher Bell | 524 (–80) |
| 1 | 4 | Chase Elliott | 500 (–104) |
| 2 | 5 | Denny Hamlin | 494 (–110) |
| | 6 | Tyler Reddick | 477 (–127) |
| | 7 | Ryan Blaney | 466 (–138) |
| | 8 | Ross Chastain | 443 (–161) |
| | 9 | Joey Logano | 411 (–193) |
| | 10 | Bubba Wallace | 411 (–193) |
| | 11 | Chase Briscoe | 393 (–211) |
| 1 | 12 | Alex Bowman | 376 (–228) |
| 1 | 13 | Chris Buescher | 373 (–231) |
| | 14 | Ryan Preece | 354 (–250) |
| 1 | 15 | Austin Cindric | 337 (–267) |
| 7 | 16 | Michael McDowell | 330 (–274) |
Official driver's standings

Manufacturers' Championship standings

| Pos | Manufacturer | Points |
|---|---|---|
| 1 | Chevrolet | 584 |
| 2 | Toyota | 568 (–16) |
| 3 | Ford | 541 (–43) |

- Note: Only the first 16 positions are included for the driver standings.
- . – Driver has clinched a position in the NASCAR Cup Series playoffs.

== Notes ==
| Previous race: 2025 FireKeepers Casino 400 | NASCAR Cup Series; 2025 season | Next race: 2025 The Great American Getaway 400 |
