= 2026 Quaker State 400 =

NASCAR stock car race held in Hampton, Georgia, U.S.

2026 Quaker State 400 available at Walmart
Race details
- Race 20 of 36 in the 2026 NASCAR Cup Series
- Date: July 12–13, 2026
- Location: Atlanta Motor Speedway in Hampton, Georgia
- Course: Permanent racing facility
- Course length: 1.54 miles (2.48 km)
- Distance: 263 laps, 405.02 mi (651.835 km)
- Scheduled distance: 260 laps, 400.4 mi (644.4 km)
- Average speed: 124.995 miles per hour (201.160 km/h)

Pole position
Driver	Ryan Blaney	Team Penske
- Time: 30.815

Most laps led
Driver	Ryan Blaney	Team Penske
- Laps: 171

Fastest lap
Driver	Cody Ware	Rick Ware Racing
- Time: 29.905

Winner
No. 12	Ryan Blaney	Team Penske

Television in the United States
- Network: TNT
- Announcers: Adam Alexander, Dale Earnhardt Jr., and Steve Letarte
- Nielsen ratings: 1.5 million

Radio in the United States
- Radio: PRN
- Booth announcers: Brad Gillie and Mark Garrow
- Turn announcers: Mark Jaynes (1 & 2) and Pat Patterson (3 & 4)

The 2026 Quaker State 400 was a NASCAR Cup Series race held on July 12 and 13, 2026, at Atlanta Motor Speedway in Hampton, Georgia. Contested over 263 laps on the 1.54-mile-long (2.48 km) asphalt quad-oval intermediate speedway (with superspeedway rules), extended from the original 260 laps due to an overtime finish, it was the 20th race of the 2026 NASCAR Cup Series season, as well as the third race of the 2026 NASCAR In-Season Challenge.

Ryan Blaney won the race. Christopher Bell finished 2nd, and Carson Hocevar finished 3rd. Ty Gibbs and Erik Jones rounded out the top five, and Shane van Gisbergen, Austin Dillon, Tyler Reddick, Joey Logano, and Chris Buescher rounded out the top ten. Bubba Wallace initially finished 2nd but was demoted to 29th after going below the yellow line on the backstraight in the final lap.

Both Reddick and Denny Hamlin officially clinched their spots in The Chase.

== Report ==
=== Background ===
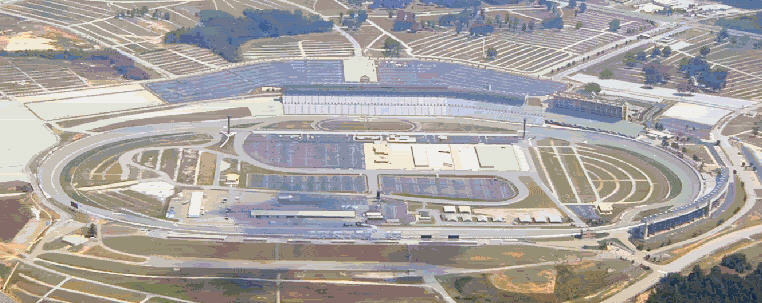
Atlanta Motor Speedway, the track where the race is held.

Atlanta Motor Speedway (formerly Atlanta International Raceway) is a 1.54-mile race track in Hampton, Georgia, United States, 20 miles (32 km) south of Atlanta. It has annually hosted NASCAR Cup Series stock car races since its inauguration in 1960.

The venue was bought by Speedway Motorsports in 1990. In 1994, 46 condominiums were built over the northeastern side of the track. In 1997, to standardize the track with Speedway Motorsports' other two intermediate ovals, the entire track was almost completely rebuilt. The frontstretch and backstretch were swapped, and the configuration of the track was changed from oval to quad-oval, with a new official length of 1.54-mile (2.48 km) where before it was 1.522-mile (2.449 km). The project made the track one of the fastest on the NASCAR circuit. In July 2021 NASCAR announced that the track would be reprofiled for the 2022 season to have 28 degrees of banking and would be narrowed from 55 to 40 feet which the track claims will turn racing at the track similar to restrictor plate superspeedways. Despite the reprofiling being criticized by drivers, construction began in August 2021 and wrapped up in December 2021. The track has seating capacity of 71,000 to 125,000 people depending on the tracks configuration.

On June 3, 2025, SMI announced the track's renaming to EchoPark Speedway under a new seven-year sponsorship deal with the Smith family-owned business, EchoPark. The renaming ended a 35-year stint under the Atlanta Motor Speedway name.

==== Entry list ====
- (R) denotes rookie driver.
- (i) denotes driver who is ineligible for series driver points.

No.	Driver	Team	Manufacturer
1	Ross Chastain	Trackhouse Racing	Chevrolet
2	Austin Cindric	Team Penske	Ford
3	Austin Dillon	Richard Childress Racing	Chevrolet
4	Noah Gragson	Front Row Motorsports	Ford
5	Kyle Larson	Hendrick Motorsports	Chevrolet
6	Brad Keselowski	RFK Racing	Ford
7	Daniel Suárez	Spire Motorsports	Chevrolet
9	Chase Elliott	Hendrick Motorsports	Chevrolet
10	Ty Dillon	Kaulig Racing	Chevrolet
11	Denny Hamlin	Joe Gibbs Racing	Toyota
12	Ryan Blaney	Team Penske	Ford
16	A. J. Allmendinger	Kaulig Racing	Chevrolet
17	Chris Buescher	RFK Racing	Ford
19	Chase Briscoe	Joe Gibbs Racing	Toyota
20	Christopher Bell	Joe Gibbs Racing	Toyota
21	Josh Berry	Wood Brothers Racing	Ford
22	Joey Logano	Team Penske	Ford
23	Bubba Wallace	23XI Racing	Toyota
24	William Byron	Hendrick Motorsports	Chevrolet
33	Austin Hill (i)	Richard Childress Racing	Chevrolet
34	Todd Gilliland	Front Row Motorsports	Ford
35	Riley Herbst	23XI Racing	Toyota
38	Zane Smith	Front Row Motorsports	Ford
41	Cole Custer	Haas Factory Team	Chevrolet
42	John Hunter Nemechek	Legacy Motor Club	Toyota
43	Erik Jones	Legacy Motor Club	Toyota
45	Tyler Reddick	23XI Racing	Toyota
47	Ricky Stenhouse Jr.	Hyak Motorsports	Chevrolet
48	Alex Bowman	Hendrick Motorsports	Chevrolet
51	Cody Ware	Rick Ware Racing	Chevrolet
54	Ty Gibbs	Joe Gibbs Racing	Toyota
60	Ryan Preece	RFK Racing	Ford
66	Chad Finchum (i)	Garage 66	Ford
71	Michael McDowell	Spire Motorsports	Chevrolet
77	Carson Hocevar	Spire Motorsports	Chevrolet
78	B. J. McLeod	Live Fast Motorsports	Chevrolet
88	Connor Zilisch (R)	Trackhouse Racing	Chevrolet
97	Shane van Gisbergen	Trackhouse Racing	Chevrolet
Official entry list

== Qualifying ==
Ryan Blaney scored the pole for the race with a time of 30.815 and a speed of 179.912 mph (289.540 km/h).

=== Qualifying results ===
Pos	No.	Driver	Team	Manufacturer	Time	Speed
1	12	Ryan Blaney	Team Penske	Ford	30.815	179.912
2	22	Joey Logano	Team Penske	Ford	30.851	179.702
3	5	Kyle Larson	Hendrick Motorsports	Chevrolet	30.902	179.406
4	3	Austin Dillon	Richard Childress Racing	Chevrolet	30.904	179.394
5	7	Daniel Suárez	Spire Motorsports	Chevrolet	30.910	179.359
6	48	Alex Bowman	Hendrick Motorsports	Chevrolet	30.933	179.226
7	9	Chase Elliott	Hendrick Motorsports	Chevrolet	30.937	179.203
8	2	Austin Cindric	Team Penske	Ford	30.939	179.191
9	1	Ross Chastain	Trackhouse Racing	Chevrolet	30.976	178.977
10	6	Brad Keselowski	RFK Racing	Ford	31.019	178.729
11	43	Erik Jones	Legacy Motor Club	Toyota	31.027	178.683
12	97	Shane van Gisbergen	Trackhouse Racing	Chevrolet	31.031	178.660
13	17	Chris Buescher	RFK Racing	Ford	31.065	178.465
14	77	Carson Hocevar	Spire Motorsports	Chevrolet	31.074	178.413
15	47	Ricky Stenhouse Jr.	Hyak Motorsports	Chevrolet	31.080	178.378
16	10	Ty Dillon	Kaulig Racing	Chevrolet	31.083	178.361
17	21	Josh Berry	Wood Brothers Racing	Ford	31.095	178.292
18	71	Michael McDowell	Spire Motorsports	Chevrolet	31.100	178.264
19	60	Ryan Preece	RFK Racing	Ford	31.109	178.212
20	19	Chase Briscoe	Joe Gibbs Racing	Toyota	31.112	178.195
21	34	Todd Gilliland	Front Row Motorsports	Ford	31.119	178.155
22	23	Bubba Wallace	23XI Racing	Toyota	31.129	178.098
23	54	Ty Gibbs	Joe Gibbs Racing	Toyota	31.149	177.983
24	42	John Hunter Nemechek	Legacy Motor Club	Toyota	31.176	177.829
25	88	Connor Zilisch (R)	Trackhouse Racing	Chevrolet	31.199	177.168
26	24	William Byron	Hendrick Motorsports	Chevrolet	31.205	177.664
27	16	A. J. Allmendinger	Kaulig Racing	Chevrolet	31.212	177.624
28	11	Denny Hamlin	Joe Gibbs Racing	Toyota	31.258	177.363
29	35	Riley Herbst	23XI Racing	Toyota	31.268	177.306
30	33	Austin Hill (i)	Richard Childress Racing	Chevrolet	31.284	177.215
31	45	Tyler Reddick	23XI Racing	Toyota	31.306	177.091
32	20	Christopher Bell	Joe Gibbs Racing	Toyota	31.319	177.017
33	41	Cole Custer	Haas Factory Team	Chevrolet	31.232	176.995
34	38	Zane Smith	Front Row Motorsports	Ford	31.331	176.949
35	51	Cody Ware	Rick Ware Racing	Chevrolet	31.415	176.476
36	4	Noah Gragson	Front Row Motorsports	Ford	31.463	176.207
37	78	B. J. McLeod	Live Fast Motorsports	Chevrolet	31.743	174.653
38	66	Chad Finchum (i)	Garage 66	Ford	0.000	0.000
Official qualifying results

== Race ==
=== Race results ===
==== Stage Results ====
Stage One Laps: 60

Pos	No	Driver	Team	Manufacturer	Points
1	12	Ryan Blaney	Team Penske	Ford	10
2	45	Tyler Reddick	23XI Racing	Toyota	9
3	5	Kyle Larson	Hendrick Motorsports	Chevrolet	8
4	22	Joey Logano	Team Penske	Ford	7
5	2	Austin Cindric	Team Penske	Ford	6
6	77	Carson Hocevar	Spire Motorsports	Chevrolet	5
7	3	Austin Dillon	Richard Childress Racing	Chevrolet	4
8	19	Chase Briscoe	Joe Gibbs Racing	Toyota	3
9	9	Chase Elliott	Hendrick Motorsports	Chevrolet	2
10	23	Bubba Wallace	23XI Racing	Toyota	1

Stage Two Laps: 100

Pos	No	Driver	Team	Manufacturer	Points
1	12	Ryan Blaney	Team Penske	Ford	10
2	45	Tyler Reddick	23XI Racing	Toyota	9
3	22	Joey Logano	Team Penske	Ford	8
4	2	Austin Cindric	Team Penske	Ford	7
5	7	Daniel Suárez	Spire Motorsports	Chevrolet	6
6	54	Ty Gibbs	Joe Gibbs Racing	Toyota	5
7	20	Christopher Bell	Joe Gibbs Racing	Toyota	4
8	43	Erik Jones	Legacy Motor Club	Toyota	3
9	11	Denny Hamlin	Joe Gibbs Racing	Toyota	2
10	97	Shane van Gisbergen	Trackhouse Racing	Chevrolet	1

=== Final Stage Results ===
Stage Three Laps: 100

Pos	Grid	No	Driver	Team	Manufacturer	Laps	Points
1	1	12	Ryan Blaney	Team Penske	Ford	263	75
2	32	20	Christopher Bell	Joe Gibbs Racing	Toyota	263	39
3	14	77	Carson Hocevar	Spire Motorsports	Chevrolet	263	39
4	23	54	Ty Gibbs	Joe Gibbs Racing	Toyota	263	38
5	11	43	Erik Jones	Legacy Motor Club	Toyota	263	35
6	12	97	Shane van Gisbergen	Trackhouse Racing	Chevrolet	263	32
7	4	3	Austin Dillon	Richard Childress Racing	Chevrolet	263	34
8	31	45	Tyler Reddick	23XI Racing	Toyota	263	47
9	2	22	Joey Logano	Team Penske	Ford	263	43
10	13	17	Chris Buescher	RFK Racing	Ford	263	27
11	9	1	Ross Chastain	Trackhouse Racing	Chevrolet	263	26
12	28	11	Denny Hamlin	Joe Gibbs Racing	Toyota	263	27
13	7	9	Chase Elliott	Hendrick Motorsports	Chevrolet	263	26
14	8	2	Austin Cindric	Team Penske	Ford	263	36
15	18	71	Michael McDowell	Spire Motorsports	Chevrolet	263	22
16	26	24	William Byron	Hendrick Motorsports	Chevrolet	263	21
17	33	41	Cole Custer	Haas Factory Team	Chevrolet	263	20
18	24	42	John Hunter Nemechek	Legacy Motor Club	Toyota	263	19
19	21	34	Todd Gilliland	Front Row Motorsports	Ford	263	18
20	16	10	Ty Dillon	Kaulig Racing	Chevrolet	263	17
21	5	7	Daniel Suárez	Spire Motorsports	Chevrolet	263	22
22	6	48	Alex Bowman	Hendrick Motorsports	Chevrolet	263	15
23	15	47	Ricky Stenhouse Jr.	Hyak Motorsports	Chevrolet	263	14
24	19	60	Ryan Preece	RFK Racing	Ford	263	13
25	17	21	Josh Berry	Wood Brothers Racing	Ford	263	12
26	10	6	Brad Keselowski	RFK Racing	Ford	263	11
27	36	4	Noah Gragson	Front Row Motorsports	Ford	263	10
28	25	88	Connor Zilisch (R)	Trackhouse Racing	Chevrolet	263	9
29	22	23	Bubba Wallace	23XI Racing	Toyota	263	9
30	34	38	Zane Smith	Front Row Motorsports	Ford	262	7
31	30	33	Austin Hill (i)	Richard Childress Racing	Chevrolet	263	0
32	35	51	Cody Ware	Rick Ware Racing	Chevrolet	259	6
33	38	66	Chad Finchum (i)	Garage 66	Ford	259	0
34	3	5	Kyle Larson	Hendrick Motorsports	Chevrolet	258	11
35	29	35	Riley Herbst	23XI Racing	Toyota	255	2
36	20	19	Chase Briscoe	Joe Gibbs Racing	Toyota	254	4
37	27	16	A. J. Allmendinger	Kaulig Racing	Chevrolet	230	1
38	37	78	B. J. McLeod	Live Fast Motorsports	Chevrolet	105	1
Official race results

=== Race statistics ===
- Lead changes: 30 among 10 different drivers
- Cautions/Laps: 7 for 49
- Red flags: 1 for 3 hours, 9 minutes and 18 seconds
- Time of race: 3 hours, 14 minutes and 25 seconds
- Average speed: 124.995 miles per hour (201.160 km/h)

== Media ==
=== Television ===
TNT covered the race on the television side. Adam Alexander, Dale Earnhardt Jr. and Steve Letarte called the race from the broadcast booth. Marty Snider, Shannon Spake, Danielle Trotta and Mamba Smith handled pit road for the television side.

TNT
Booth announcers	Pit reporters
Lap-by-lap: Adam Alexander; Color-commentator: Dale Earnhardt Jr. Color-commentator: Steve Letarte	Marty Snider; Shannon Spake; Danielle Trotta; Mamba Smith

=== Radio ===
The race was broadcast on radio by the Performance Racing Network and simulcast on Sirius XM NASCAR Radio. Brad Gillie and Nick Yeoman called the race from the booth when the field races down the front stretch. Mark Jaynes called the race from atop a billboard outside of turn 2 when the field races through turns 1 and 2, and Doug Turnbull called the race from a billboard outside of turn 3 when the field races through turns 3 and 4. On pit road, PRN was manned by Andrew Kurland, David Styles and Doug Turnbull.

PRN
Booth announcers	Turn announcers	Pit reporters
Lead announcer: Brad Gillie; Announcer: Nick Yeoman	Turns 1 & 2: Mark Jaynes; Turns 3 & 4: Pat Patterson	Andrew Kurland; David Styles; Doug Turnbull

== Standings after the race ==
Drivers' Championship standings

	Pos	Driver	Points
	1	Denny Hamlin	791
	2	Tyler Reddick	767 (–24)
	3	Ryan Blaney	726 (–65)
	4	Ty Gibbs	665 (–126)
	5	Chase Elliott	610 (–181)
	6	Kyle Larson	594 (–197)
	7	Chris Buescher	568 (–223)
1	8	Carson Hocevar	563 (–228)
1	9	Christopher Bell	551 (–240)
2	10	Chase Briscoe	542 (–249)
	11	Daniel Suárez	529 (–262)
	12	William Byron	520 (–271)
	13	Bubba Wallace	493 (–298)
1	14	Austin Cindric	470 (–321)
1	15	Shane van Gisbergen	469 (–322)
	16	Erik Jones	446 (–345)
Official driver's standings

Manufacturers' Championship standings

Pos	Manufacturer	Points
1	Toyota	927
2	Chevrolet	806 (–121)
3	Ford	677 (–250)

- Note: Only the first 16 positions are included for the driver standings.

=== NASCAR In-Season Challenge bracket ===
Sonoma
1	#45 Tyler Reddick	36th
32	#48 Alex Bowman	10th
16	#2 Austin Cindric	13th
17	#6 Brad Keselowski	15th
8	#7 Daniel Suárez	31st
25	#34 Todd Gilliland	29th
9	#77 Carson Hocevar	11th
24	#38 Zane Smith	18th
12	#19 Chase Briscoe	2nd
21	#16 A. J. Allmendinger	16th
5	#54 Ty Gibbs	3rd
28	#3 Austin Dillon	27th
13	#23 Bubba Wallace	22nd
20	#71 Michael McDowell	9th
4	#9 Chase Elliott	17th
29	#4 Noah Gragson	32nd
2	#11 Denny Hamlin	26th
31	#10 Ty Dillon	35th
15	#43 Erik Jones	23rd
18	#22 Joey Logano	24th
7	#17 Chris Buescher	19th
26	#42 John Hunter Nemechek	25th
10	#20 Christopher Bell	5th
23	#1 Ross Chastain	14th
11	#24 William Byron	12th
22	#47 Ricky Stenhouse Jr.	21st
6	#5 Kyle Larson	4th
27	#35 Riley Herbst	30th
14	#97 Shane van Gisbergen	1st
19	#60 Ryan Preece	8th
3	#12 Ryan Blaney	6th
30	#21 Josh Berry	28th

Chicagoland
32	#48 Bowman	5th
16	#2 Cindric	13th
25	#34 Gilliland	16th
9	#77 Hocevar	22nd
12	#19 Briscoe	1st
5	#54 Ty Gibbs	8th
20	#71 McDowell	29th
4	#9 Elliott	11th
2	#11 Hamlin	3rd
15	#43 Jones	15th
7	#17 Buescher	19th
10	#20 Bell	2nd
11	#24 Byron	4th
6	#5 Larson	34th
14	#97 van Gisbergen	25th
3	#12 Blaney	7th

Atlanta
32	#48 Bowman	22nd
25	#34 Gilliland	19th
12	#19 Briscoe	36th
4	#9 Elliott	13th
2	#11 Hamlin	12th
10	#20 Bell	2nd
11	#24 Byron	16th
3	#12 Blaney	1st

North Wilkesboro
25	#34 Gilliland	8th
4	#9 Elliott	17th
10	#20 Bell	19th
3	#12 Blaney	11th

Indianapolis
25	#34 Gilliland	24th
3	#12 Blaney	26th

Previous race: 2026 eero 400	NASCAR Cup Series; 2026 season	Next race: 2026 Window World 450
