= 2026 NASCAR In-Season Challenge =

Motorsports tournament

Tournament information
- Date: June 28 – July 26, 2026
- Venue(s): Sonoma Raceway; Chicagoland Speedway; EchoPark Speedeay; North Wilkesboro Speedway; Indianapolis Motor Speedway
- Teams: 32 (full-time)
- Purse: US$1 Million

Final positions
- Champions: No. 34 Todd Gilliland; Front Row Motorsports
- Runner-up: No. 12 Ryan Blaney; Team Penske

The 2026 NASCAR In-Season Challenge was a multi-stage motorsport tournament that was played during the 2026 NASCAR Cup Series. It was the second edition of the NASCAR In-Season Challenge. 32 full-time drivers in the series participated in the tournament and races counted toward the regular season and playoff standings as normal.

Ty Gibbs of Joe Gibbs Racing was the defending winner of the tournament.

Following the Brickyard 400 at the Indianapolis Motor Speedway, Todd Gilliland of Front Row Motorsports defeated Ryan Blaney of Team Penske to win the US$1 million.

== Format ==
The tournament consisted of five regular season races that would run during June and July. The top 32 drivers in driver points standings were seeded into the bracket based on their performance based on the regular season standings. The five races conducted in a single elimination bracket, with the first four rounds known as "Challenge Rounds". In each round, the driver in each matchup with the better finish advanced, while the other was eliminated. This process continues until only two drivers remain in the "Champions Round"; the driver with the better finish in that race would become the tournament champion. Cole Custer, Connor Zilisch, and Cody Ware failed to qualify for the In-Season Challenge following the Anduril 250 at Naval Base Coronado in San Diego, California. Austin Hill, who took over full-time duties in the Cup Series following the death of Kyle Busch, also did not qualify for the tournament, even though his car sits in 26th in owner's points, due to being ineligible for Cup Series points because he had registered to earn points in the NASCAR O'Reilly Auto Parts Series.

== Changes ==
2026 marked the first year of major rule changes that marked drivers being ranked off of regular season points rather than three seeding races used in 2025.

== Schedule ==
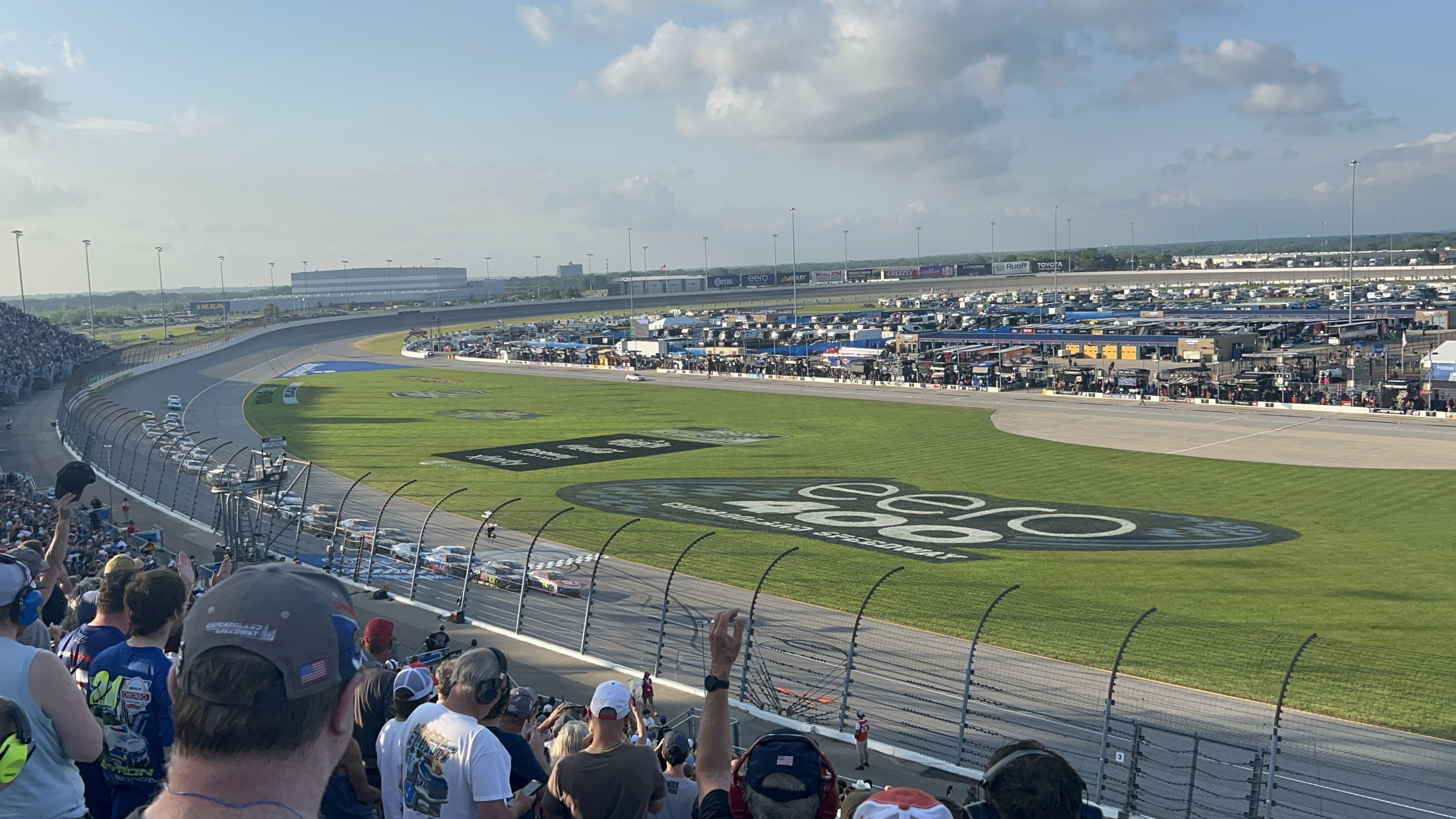
Chicagoland Speedway for the eero 400, the track where Round 2 was held.

O Oval track
R Road course

No	Race name	Track	Location	Date	Time (ET)	TV	Radio	Report
1	Toyota/Save Mart 350	R Sonoma Raceway	Sonoma, California	June 28	3:30 pm	TNT	PRN	Report
2	eero 400	O Chicagoland Speedway	Joliet, Illinois	July 5	6 pm	TNT	MRN	Report
3	Quaker State 400	O EchoPark Speedway	Hampton, Georgia	July 12	7 pm	TNT	PRN	Report
4	Window World 450	O North Wilkesboro Speedway	North Wilkesboro, North Carolina	July 19	7 pm	TNT	PRN	Report
5	Brickyard 400	O Indianapolis Motor Speedway	Speedway, Indiana	July 26	2 pm	TNT	IMS	Report

== Bracket ==
Sonoma
1	#45 Tyler Reddick	36th
32	#48 Alex Bowman	10th
16	#2 Austin Cindric	13th
17	#6 Brad Keselowski	15th
8	#7 Daniel Suárez	31st
25	#34 Todd Gilliland	29th
9	#77 Carson Hocevar	11th
24	#38 Zane Smith	18th
12	#19 Chase Briscoe	2nd
21	#16 A. J. Allmendinger	16th
5	#54 Ty Gibbs	3rd
28	#3 Austin Dillon	27th
13	#23 Bubba Wallace	22nd
20	#71 Michael McDowell	9th
4	#9 Chase Elliott	17th
29	#4 Noah Gragson	32nd
2	#11 Denny Hamlin	26th
31	#10 Ty Dillon	35th
15	#43 Erik Jones	23rd
18	#22 Joey Logano	24th
7	#17 Chris Buescher	19th
26	#42 John Hunter Nemechek	25th
10	#20 Christopher Bell	5th
23	#1 Ross Chastain	14th
11	#24 William Byron	12th
22	#47 Ricky Stenhouse Jr.	21st
6	#5 Kyle Larson	4th
27	#35 Riley Herbst	30th
14	#97 Shane van Gisbergen	1st
19	#60 Ryan Preece	8th
3	#12 Ryan Blaney	6th
30	#21 Josh Berry	28th

Chicagoland
32	#48 Bowman	5th
16	#2 Cindric	13th
25	#34 Gilliland	16th
9	#77 Hocevar	22nd
12	#19 Briscoe	1st
5	#54 Ty Gibbs	8th
20	#71 McDowell	29th
4	#9 Elliott	11th
2	#11 Hamlin	3rd
15	#43 Jones	15th
7	#17 Buescher	19th
10	#20 Bell	2nd
11	#24 Byron	4th
6	#5 Larson	34th
14	#97 van Gisbergen	25th
3	#12 Blaney	7th

Atlanta
32	#48 Bowman	22nd
25	#34 Gilliland	19th
12	#19 Briscoe	36th
4	#9 Elliott	13th
2	#11 Hamlin	12th
10	#20 Bell	2nd
11	#24 Byron	16th
3	#12 Blaney	1st

North Wilkesboro
25	#34 Gilliland	8th
4	#9 Elliott	17th
10	#20 Bell	19th
3	#12 Blaney	11th

Indianapolis
25	#34 Gilliland	24th
3	#12 Blaney	26th

== Broadcasting ==
All tournament races were shown on TNT and streamed on HBO Max.
