= NASCAR In-Season Challenge =

Regular-season tournament of the National Association for Stock Car Auto Racing

- Founder: Denny Hamlin
- First season: 2025
- Organising body: NASCAR
- Most recent champions: No. 34 Todd Gilliland; Front Row Motorsports (2026)
- Broadcasters: United States: TNT
- Streaming partners: United States: HBO Max
- 2026 NASCAR In-Season Challenge

The NASCAR In-Season Challenge (initially titled the NASCAR In-Season Tournament) is a single-elimination tournament that is conducted among drivers in the NASCAR Cup Series. It made its debut during the 2025 season.

The In-Season Challenge became the second $1 million bonus event in the Cup Series, joining the NASCAR All-Star Race.

== Predecessors and creation ==
The in-season tournament is not the first time that an extra event was organized alongside the Cup Series season, with various formats done through NASCAR history. The first was the Winston Million from 1985 to 1997, giving a driver a cash prize for their victory in four assigned races. In 1998, the format was expanded to five races and became the No Bull 5, a challenge where a driver must finish in the top 5 and then win in two consecutive Crown Jewel races to earn a million dollar prize. This format lasted until 2002.

With the advent of the Chase for the Cup in 2004, later reformulated as the NASCAR playoffs in 2014–2017, the idea of a mid-season event was instead used in the lower tiers of NASCAR competition. In 2009, NASCAR adopted the Dash 4 Cash for its Nationwide Series, now named the O'Reilly Auto Parts Series. In 2019, the Triple Truck Challenge was adopted in the Truck Series. Both are organized to this day alongside the regular seasons and chase for both series.

The idea of a in-season format based on March Madness and the NBA Cup (which was introduced in 2023) was conceptualized by Cup Series driver and 23XI Racing co-owner Denny Hamlin, first publicly mentioned in his podcast Actions Detrimental. According to Hamlin, the Cup season needed more storylines during the mid-summer part of regular season as he felt there wasn't much buzz and too few stories going on in the series until the final races before the Playoffs. Hamlin himself realized a non-official version of the format during the 2023 and 2024 seasons.

The format, along with his podcast, became successful enough to get the attention of NASCAR leadership, who decided to turn the concept idea into an official mid-season event from the 2025 season. Upon the announcement, Denny jokingly mentioned that he wanted to win the million-dollar prize for the first In-Season Challenge as royalties.

== Format ==
The tournament consists of five races that are run during the regular season, with all races counting toward the standings as normal. The 32 drivers with the best performances move on to the next phase of the tournament. The seeding races for 2025 were streamed on Amazon Prime Video as part of their inaugural broadcasting tenure. The last five races are conducted in a single elimination bracket. In each of the four "Challenge Rounds", the driver in each matchup with the better finish advances, while the other is eliminated. This process will continue until only two drivers remain in what is known as the "Champions Round"; the driver with the better finish in that race will be the tournament champion and win a $1 million bonus. All tournament races are shown on TNT.

In 2025, the first race of the bracketed portion was held at Atlanta Motor Speedway for the Quaker State 400 on June 28. The rest of the races included the Chicago Street Course, Sonoma, Dover, and Indianapolis.

In 2026, seeding was tweaked so that the seeding would be based on regular season driver points standings with more wins, then highest finish, as the tiebreaker, as opposed to the three seeding races.

== Past winners ==
Year	Date(s)	Seed	No.	Driver	Team	Manufacturer
2025	June 28 – July 27	#6	54	Ty Gibbs	Joe Gibbs Racing	Toyota
2026	June 28 – July 26	#25	34	Todd Gilliland	Front Row Motorsports	Ford

== List of tracks held ==
Track	City	2025	2026	2027
Iowa Speedway	Newton, IA	—N/a	—N/a	Round 1
Sonoma Raceway	Sonoma, CA	Round 3	Round 1	Round 2
EchoPark Speedway	Hampton, GA	Round 1	Round 3	Round 3
Indianapolis Motor Speedway	Speedway, IN	Round 5	Round 5	Round 4
Coronado Street Course	San Diego, CA	—N/a	—N/a	Round 5
Chicagoland Speedway	Joliet, IL	—N/a	Round 2	—N/a
North Wilkesboro Speedway	North Wilkesboro, NC	—N/a	Round 4	—N/a
Chicago Street Course	Chicago, IL	Round 2	—N/a	—N/a
Dover Motor Speedway	Dover, DE	Round 4	—N/a	—N/a

== Reception ==
The NASCAR in-season tournament's concept was praised by several current and former NASCAR Cup Series drivers, including Christopher Bell, Dale Earnhardt Jr. and Ryan Blaney upon being announced.

== See also ==
- Soccer knockout competitions, such as the FA Cup and US Open Cup
- NBA Cup
