= Adam Alexander (sportscaster) =

American television announcer

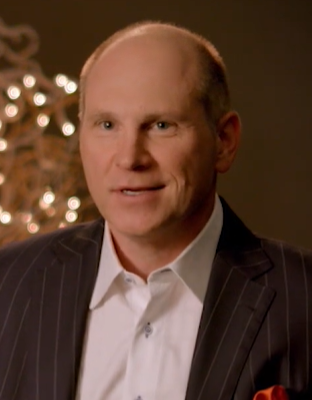
- Alexander in 2018
- Born: July 11, 1973 (age 53); Madison, Indiana, U.S.
- Education: University of Evansville
- Occupation: Television announcer
- Known for: NASCAR on The CW, NASCAR on Prime Video and NASCAR on TNT commentator
- Sports commentary career
- Genre: Play-by-play
- Sport: NASCAR

Adam Alexander (born July 11, 1973) is an American TV sports announcer. He currently is the lap-by-lap announcer for NASCAR's coverage of the NASCAR O'Reilly Auto Parts Series on The CW, and NASCAR Cup Series coverage on Prime Video and TNT.

He previously worked for NASCAR on Fox as their play-by-play for the NASCAR Xfinity Series from 2015 to 2024 and as a host of NASCAR Race Hub. Alexander also was the play-by-play for TNT's previous Cup Series TV coverage from 2010 to 2014 and prior to that was a pit reporter for TNT, NASCAR on Speed and Motor Racing Network. He also has called college football and college basketball games for Fox.

== Career ==
Alexander began his career at television station WEVV in Evansville, Indiana, and he concurrently served as a public address announcer for the Tri-State Speedway and also called games for the Evansville Purple Aces men's basketball team. Alexander also worked for WBKR in nearby Owensboro, Kentucky, and hosted a weekly racing talk show in the late 1990s.

Alexander was part of the Indianapolis Motor Speedway Radio Network as a pit reporter and turn announcer for the Indianapolis 500 in the early 2000s.

Alexander worked for the Motor Racing Network for coverage of NASCAR from 2000 to 2006 as a studio host, pit reporter, and play-by-play announcer. He worked on coverage of the Sprint Cup and Nationwide Series and did play-by-play for the NASCAR Camping World Truck Series.

Alexander was a pit reporter for NASCAR on TNT from 2006 through 2009 and did play-by-play coverage from 2010 to 2014. Alexander was the host of SPEED Center on the defunct SPEED channel, and also worked on NASCAR Live! and NASCAR in a Hurry. He was a pit reporter for the NASCAR Camping World Truck Series on the network, and also worked for DirecTV's Hot Pass coverage of NASCAR events.

In 2013, Alexander worked with Chris Simms to announce College Football on Fox.

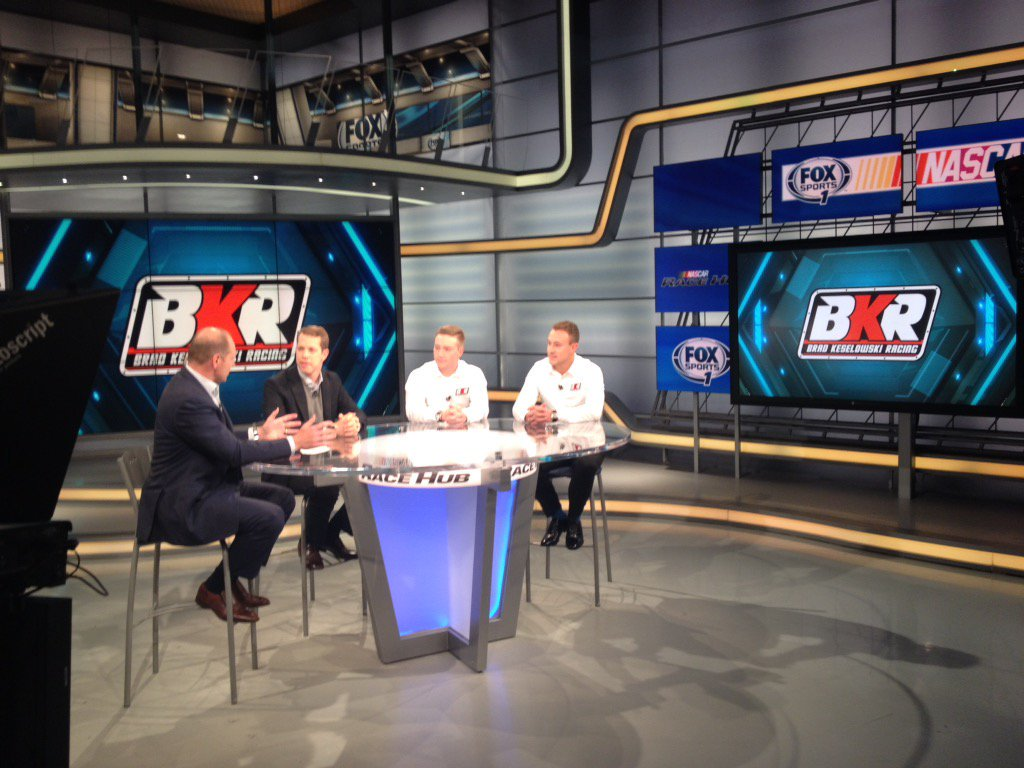
Alexander (left) interviewing Brad Keselowski, Tyler Reddick and Daniel Hemric on NASCAR Race Hub in 2015

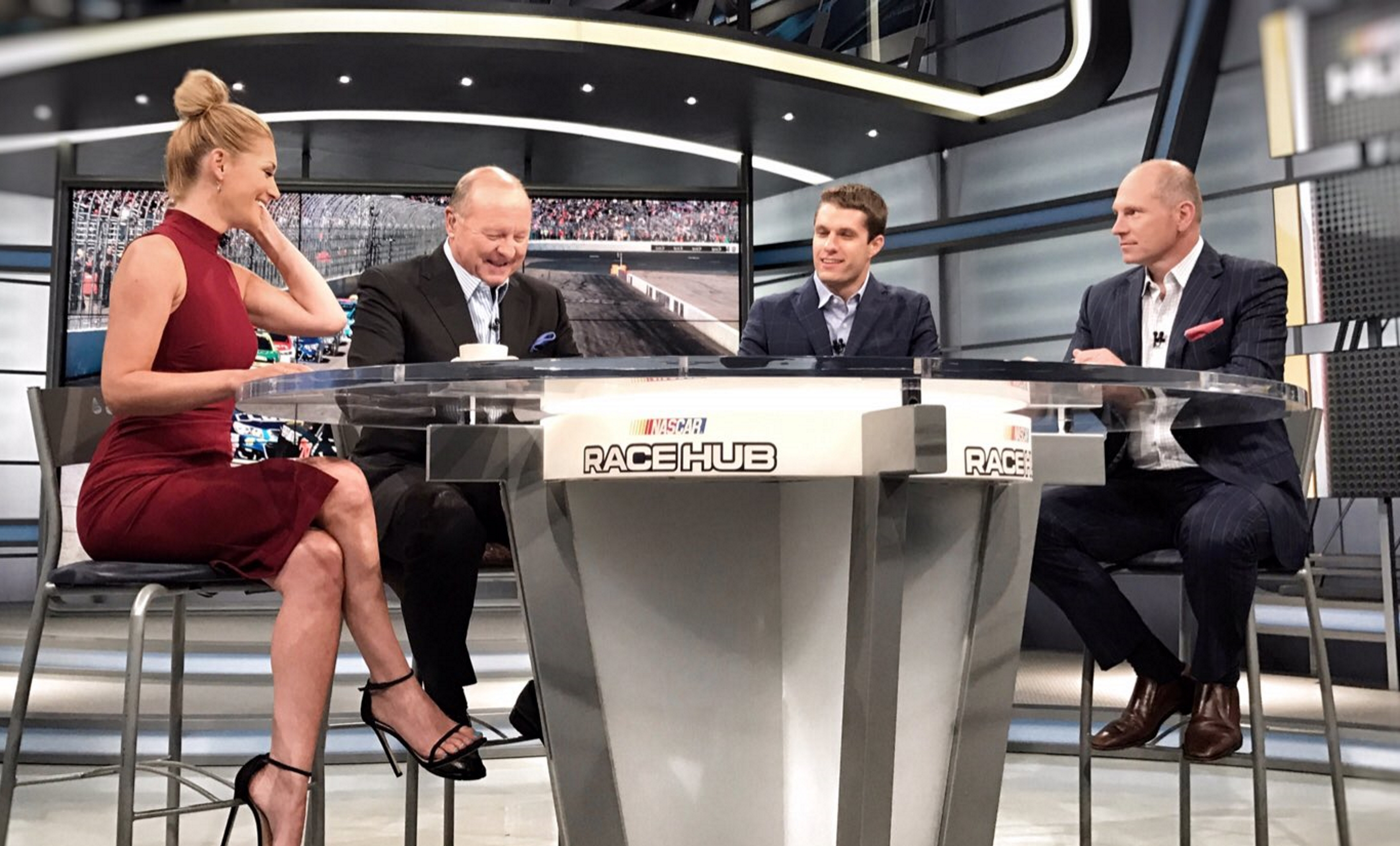
Alexander (right) on an episode of NASCAR Race Hub with Danielle Trotta, Larry McReynolds and David Ragan in 2016

Starting in August 2014, Alexander and Steve Byrnes rotated as play-by-play announcers for the NASCAR Camping World Truck Series broadcasts on Fox after Rick Allen left for NBC in order to prepare for the debut of their NASCAR coverage in 2015 in which he would be the play-by-play announcer. In October 2014, Alexander became the full-time Truck Series play-by-play for the remainder of the season after Byrnes was diagnosed with cancer. In 2015, Alexander became the play-by-play for Fox for the Xfinity Series after the network took over the TV rights for the series from ESPN for the first half of the season. He continues to hold this position today and shares the booth with drivers and crew chiefs from the NASCAR Cup Series rotating as guest color commentators.

In 2019 and 2020 (for all races before the COVID-19 pandemic), Alexander became Fox's at-track pre-race show host for the Cup Series, replacing Chris Myers, who moved to Fox's Premier Boxing Champions coverage. However, Myers would remain in the role for the Daytona 500 both years instead of Alexander. In 2021, Myers returned to the role for all of Fox's Cup Series races. When Myers missed the 2021 NASCAR All-Star Race and the spring race at Dover in 2022, Alexander filled in for him as the at-track pre-race show host for those two races.

Alexander played a cameo role in the 2017 film Logan Lucky.

On November 18, 2024, it was announced that Alexander would return to TNT and move over to Amazon's coverage in the next NASCAR TV contract (from 2025 to 2031), reuniting with TNT after previously being their Cup Series play-by-play from 2010 to 2014. He will be in the booth for both networks with Dale Earnhardt Jr. and Steve Letarte. Alexander will also join CW Sports to become the Xfinity Series play-by-play for NASCAR on The CW in 2025.

== Personal life ==
Alexander was born in Madison, Indiana, and graduated from Vincennes University and University of Evansville. He later moved to the Charlotte, North Carolina area. He is not related to former NASCAR drivers Blaise Alexander and Mike Alexander and current NASCAR driver Morgan Alexander despite having the same last name.
