= Danielle Trotta =

American sportscaster (born 1981)

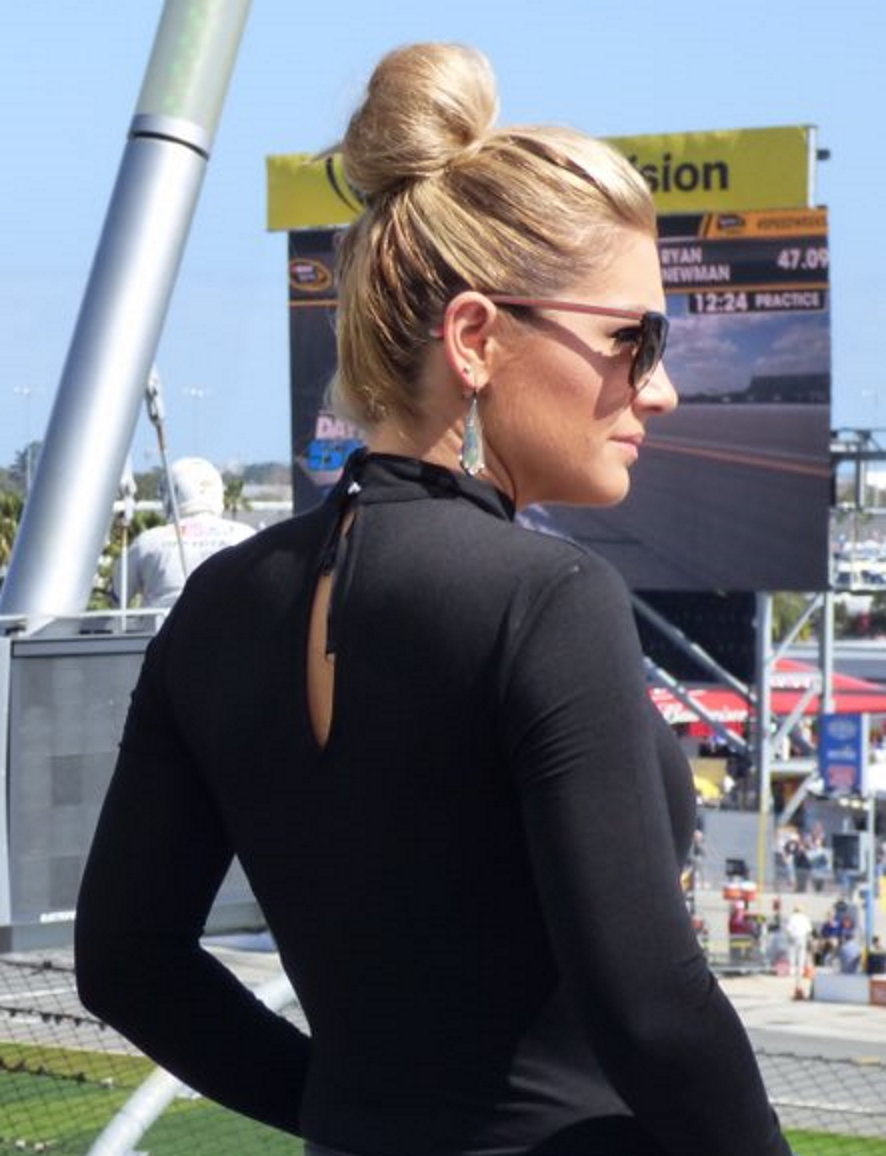
- Trotta at Daytona International Speedway in 2016
- Born: March 13, 1981 (age 45); Westchester County, New York, U.S.
- Education: University of North Carolina at Charlotte
- Occupation: Journalist
- Spouse: Robby Benton

Danielle Trotta (born March 13, 1981) is an American sports commentator and analyst who covers NASCAR on television for NASCAR on Prime and on radio for SiriusXM NASCAR Radio. She was the co-host of NASCAR Race Hub, and the pre-race show NASCAR RaceDay for Xfinity Series events on Fox Sports 1. Trotta started her career in high school, and after graduating from the University of North Carolina at Charlotte, she worked for local station WBTV. She moved to Fox Sports in July 2010 where she has covered NASCAR and the NFL. In 2018, she joined the cast of Boston Sports Tonight at NBC Sports Boston. After Trotta and other on-air personalities were released from the network by NBCUniversal, in 2022 and 2023 Trotta hosted the television series My Dream Car! on Fox Business and Fox Nation. She currently covers racing on SiriusXM satellite radio.

== Life and career ==
Trotta was born and raised in Westchester County, New York. She is the daughter of Phyllis and high school girls' basketball coach Dan Trotta, and has one younger sister, Andrea. Her family moved to Richmond, Indiana, when Trotta was ten years old, and at the age of 13 before she started high school, moved to Carmel for business reasons. Trotta, who was inspired to go into broadcasting after watching an NBA on NBC pre-game broadcast by Bob Costas and Hannah Storm, started her career in television while she attended Carmel High School by working for the school's 24-hour local channel as a host and presenter between 1995 and 1999. She also took part in three consecutive statewide championships in swimming, diving and springboard diving.

Trotta enrolled in four colleges along the East Coast before she graduated from the University of North Carolina at Charlotte with a degree in Mass Journalism in 2005. During her period in college, Trotta had internships with television stations with Indianapolis and with Charlotte, North Carolina–based stations WCNC-TV and WBTV (she joined the latter in 2004). After graduation, she was hired full-time as a weekend news editor for WBTV. Trotta started as a photographer, and later convinced the station's management to allow herself to be shown on television. She made her on-screen début at WBTV as weekend sports anchor in 2007, following the departure of Kricket Morton that April; Trotta additionally hosted Sports Saturday Night, and co-hosted The Point After with D&D with Delano Little on Sunday nights.

She moved to the station's sports department in August 2006; She stated her favourite stories were those about high school athletes who overcame challenges on the playing field and in the local community. Trotta remained with WBTV until 2010, when she moved to Fox Sports's Speed in July after being offered a three-year contract to work as a reporter on NASCAR Race Hub. Despite leaving, WBTV won a Radio Television Digital News Association of the Carolinas award for a sports special program called First Class that she contributed to in October 2010. She also co-presented the ACC Network's pregame and half time show, The ACC Blizz, alongside football coach Tommy Bowden in 2011, and also wrote football columns for local newspaper Charlotte Weekly. Trotta was also a weekly contributor on NASCAR and ACC Football on Charlotte-based talk radio station ESPN 730. She was mentored by fellow Fox Sports employee Steve Byrnes.

In 2012, Trotta moved into a co-host role, and presented Speed's coverage of that year's NASCAR Sprint Awards Ceremony from Las Vegas. She also hosted various specials devoted to NASCAR, along with Supercross and MotoGP events throughout 2014. Since 2015, Trotta has been the host of NASCAR RaceDay for Xfinity Series races, and in the same year, made her début as a sideline reporter for coverage of the game between the Arizona Cardinals and Cleveland Browns on Fox NFL.

On February 13, 2017, Trotta tweeted that she would be leaving NASCAR Race Hub to pursue other opportunities. A few hours later a press conference was held to announce that Shannon Spake would take over Trotta's duties as co-host of NASCAR Race Hub and host of the Xfinity Series edition of NASCAR RaceDay on Saturdays. She told The Charlotte Observer in 2022 that she left Fox Sports because she did not want to be typecast as a "the NASCAR girl". In 2019, Trotta joined NBC Sports' NASCAR coverage as host of the "Victory Lap" post-race show for select Cup Series races.

On August 3, 2020, Trotta, along with many other NBC Sports Boston on-air personalities, were released from the network due to decisions made by parent company NBCUniversal.

In 2022 and 2023, Trotta hosted the television series My Dream Car! on the Fox Business cable news channel, and on the Fox Nation subscription video on demand service, where "Families find, buy and restore a car as a surprise for their loved ones."

In 2025, Trotta returned to NASCAR on TV as the pre and post-race show host for Amazon Prime's new coverage starting that year.

== Personal life ==
She is married to former NASCAR Busch Series stock car driver Robby Benton.

== See also ==
- List of Fox NASCAR broadcasters
