= 2017 Coca-Cola 600 =

Race details
- Race 12 of 36 in the 2017 Monster Energy NASCAR Cup Series
- Date: May 28–29, 2017
- Location: Charlotte Motor Speedway in Concord, North Carolina
- Course: Permanent racing facility
- Course length: 1.5 miles (2.4 km)
- Distance: 400 laps, 600 mi (960 km)
- Average speed: 138.800 miles per hour (223.377 km/h)

Pole position
Driver	Kevin Harvick	Stewart–Haas Racing
- Time: 27.918

Most laps led
Driver	Martin Truex Jr.	Furniture Row Racing
- Laps: 233

Winner
No. 3	Austin Dillon	Richard Childress Racing

Television in the United States
- Network: Fox
- Announcers: Mike Joy, Jeff Gordon and Darrell Waltrip
- Nielsen ratings: 2.8/6 (Overnight); 2.8/6 (Final); 4.6 million viewers

Radio in the United States
- Radio: PRN
- Booth announcers: Doug Rice, Mark Garrow and Wendy Venturini
- Turn announcers: Rob Albright (1 & 2) and Pat Patterson (3 & 4)

The 2017 Coca-Cola 600, the 58th running of the event, was a Monster Energy NASCAR Cup Series race held on May 28 and 29th, 2017 at Charlotte Motor Speedway in Concord, North Carolina. Contested over 400 laps on the 1.5 mile (2.42 km) asphalt speedway, it was the 12th race of the 2017 Monster Energy NASCAR Cup Series season. Austin Dillon won the first race of his NASCAR Cup Series career for Richard Childress Racing in car number 3, the first time the 3 car had won a Cup Series event since 2000. It was also the first race to be broken into four stages rather than the normal three.

== Entry list ==
No.	Driver	Team	Manufacturer
1	Jamie McMurray	Chip Ganassi Racing	Chevrolet
2	Brad Keselowski	Team Penske	Ford
3	Austin Dillon	Richard Childress Racing	Chevrolet
4	Kevin Harvick	Stewart–Haas Racing	Ford
5	Kasey Kahne	Hendrick Motorsports	Chevrolet
6	Trevor Bayne	Roush Fenway Racing	Ford
7	J. J. Yeley (i)	Tommy Baldwin Racing	Chevrolet
10	Danica Patrick	Stewart–Haas Racing	Ford
11	Denny Hamlin	Joe Gibbs Racing	Toyota
13	Ty Dillon (R)	Germain Racing	Chevrolet
14	Clint Bowyer	Stewart–Haas Racing	Ford
15	Reed Sorenson	Premium Motorsports	Chevrolet
17	Ricky Stenhouse Jr.	Roush Fenway Racing	Ford
18	Kyle Busch	Joe Gibbs Racing	Toyota
19	Daniel Suárez (R)	Joe Gibbs Racing	Toyota
20	Matt Kenseth	Joe Gibbs Racing	Toyota
21	Ryan Blaney	Wood Brothers Racing	Ford
22	Joey Logano	Team Penske	Ford
23	Gray Gaulding (R)	BK Racing	Toyota
24	Chase Elliott	Hendrick Motorsports	Chevrolet
27	Paul Menard	Richard Childress Racing	Chevrolet
31	Ryan Newman	Richard Childress Racing	Chevrolet
32	Matt DiBenedetto	Go Fas Racing	Ford
33	Jeffrey Earnhardt	Circle Sport – The Motorsports Group	Chevrolet
34	Landon Cassill	Front Row Motorsports	Ford
37	Chris Buescher	JTG Daugherty Racing	Chevrolet
38	David Ragan	Front Row Motorsports	Ford
41	Kurt Busch	Stewart–Haas Racing	Ford
42	Kyle Larson	Chip Ganassi Racing	Chevrolet
43	Regan Smith (i)	Richard Petty Motorsports	Ford
47	A. J. Allmendinger	JTG Daugherty Racing	Chevrolet
48	Jimmie Johnson	Hendrick Motorsports	Chevrolet
51	Timmy Hill (i)	Rick Ware Racing	Chevrolet
55	Derrike Cope	Premium Motorsports	Toyota
72	Cole Whitt	TriStar Motorsports	Chevrolet
77	Erik Jones (R)	Furniture Row Racing	Toyota
78	Martin Truex Jr.	Furniture Row Racing	Toyota
83	Corey LaJoie (R)	BK Racing	Toyota
88	Dale Earnhardt Jr.	Hendrick Motorsports	Chevrolet
95	Michael McDowell	Leavine Family Racing	Chevrolet
Official entry list

== First practice ==
Erik Jones was the fastest in the first practice session with a time of 28.021 seconds and a speed of 192.713 mph (310.142 km/h).

Pos	No.	Driver	Team	Manufacturer	Time	Speed
1	77	Erik Jones (R)	Furniture Row Racing	Toyota	28.021	192.713
2	48	Jimmie Johnson	Hendrick Motorsports	Chevrolet	28.056	192.472
3	42	Kyle Larson	Chip Ganassi Racing	Chevrolet	28.057	192.465
Official first practice results

== Qualifying ==
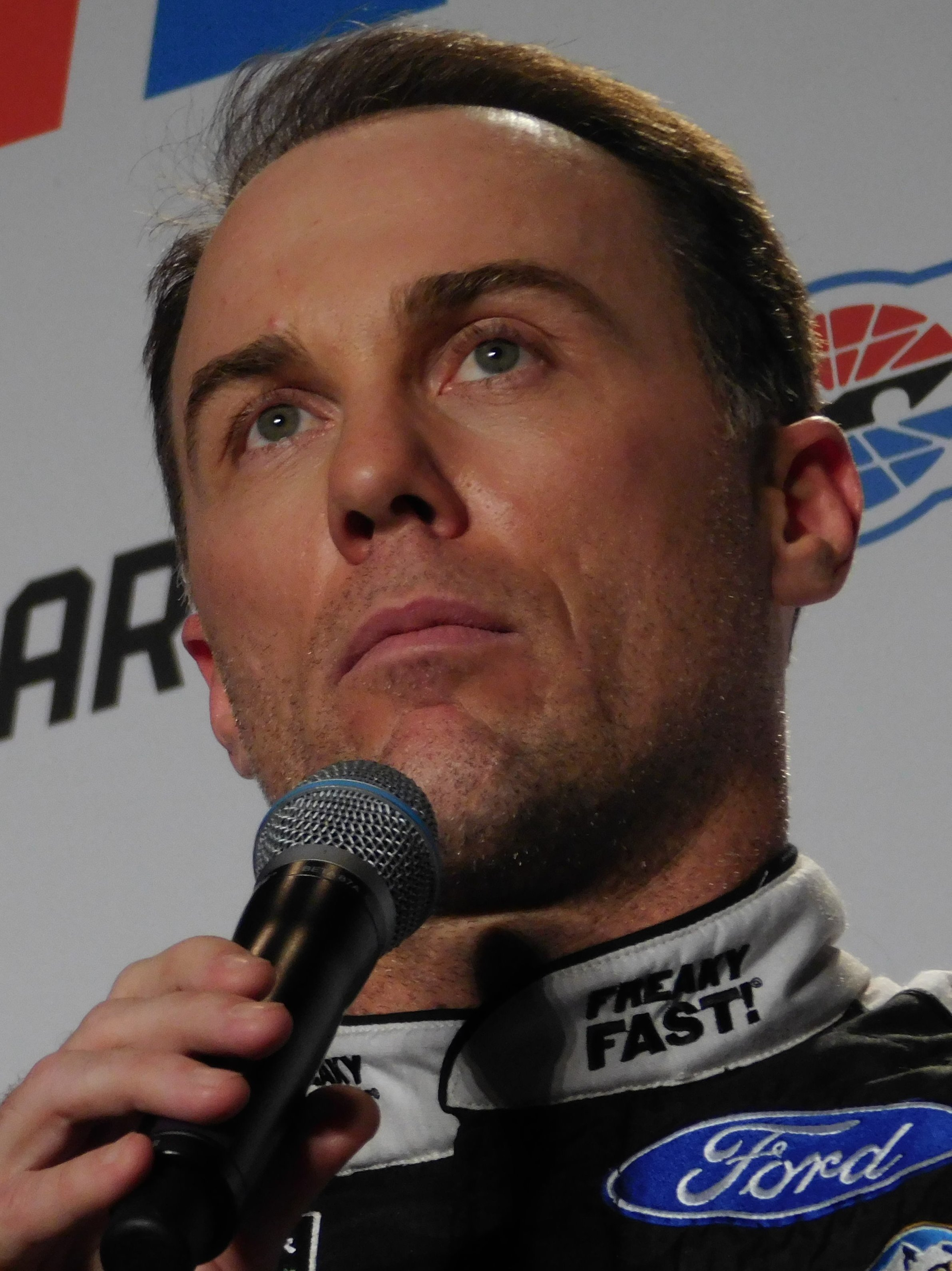
Kevin Harvick scored the pole position.

Kevin Harvick scored the pole for the race with a time of 27.918 and a speed of 193.424 mph (311.286 km/h). Harvick said afterwards that in qualifying, the cars were more loose "than they were in practice and just based on past experience here it was a handful through one and two. I just about lost it the first run, but the car was so good in three and four I didn’t want to over-adjust on it and make it too tight down there because you get tighter as the lap runs, so the guys did a good job of making adjustments, but not making it so tight that I couldn’t carry the throttle like I needed to in three and four. So they just did a great job on our Mobil 1 Ford.”

=== Qualifying results ===
Pos	No.	Driver	Team	Manufacturer	R1	R2	R3
1	4	Kevin Harvick	Stewart–Haas Racing	Ford	28.335	27.945	27.918
2	18	Kyle Busch	Joe Gibbs Racing	Toyota	28.216	27.947	28.050
3	24	Chase Elliott	Hendrick Motorsports	Chevrolet	28.407	28.164	28.087
4	20	Matt Kenseth	Joe Gibbs Racing	Toyota	28.309	28.259	28.106
5	77	Erik Jones (R)	Furniture Row Racing	Toyota	28.302	28.253	28.157
6	11	Denny Hamlin	Joe Gibbs Racing	Toyota	28.271	28.275	28.159
7	21	Ryan Blaney	Wood Brothers Racing	Ford	28.370	28.199	28.164
8	78	Martin Truex Jr.	Furniture Row Racing	Toyota	28.543	28.183	28.236
9	14	Clint Bowyer	Stewart–Haas Racing	Ford	28.590	28.173	28.266
10	2	Brad Keselowski	Team Penske	Ford	28.597	28.264	28.297
11	1	Jamie McMurray	Chip Ganassi Racing	Chevrolet	28.422	28.295	28.346
12	41	Kurt Busch	Stewart–Haas Racing	Ford	28.494	28.209	28.420
13	17	Ricky Stenhouse Jr.	Roush Fenway Racing	Ford	28.326	28.327	—
14	48	Jimmie Johnson	Hendrick Motorsports	Chevrolet	28.370	28.369	—
15	10	Danica Patrick	Stewart–Haas Racing	Ford	28.501	28.380	—
16	27	Paul Menard	Richard Childress Racing	Chevrolet	28.378	28.385	—
17	31	Ryan Newman	Richard Childress Racing	Chevrolet	28.524	28.410	—
18	6	Trevor Bayne	Roush Fenway Racing	Ford	28.601	28.419	—
19	88	Dale Earnhardt Jr.	Hendrick Motorsports	Chevrolet	28.612	28.430	—
20	19	Daniel Suárez (R)	Joe Gibbs Racing	Toyota	28.521	28.455	—
21	95	Michael McDowell	Leavine Family Racing	Chevrolet	28.669	28.478	—
22	3	Austin Dillon	Richard Childress Racing	Chevrolet	28.651	28.479	—
23	22	Joey Logano	Team Penske	Ford	28.539	28.501	—
24	5	Kasey Kahne	Hendrick Motorsports	Chevrolet	28.557	28.656	—
25	43	Regan Smith (i)	Richard Petty Motorsports	Ford	28.676	—	—
26	47	A. J. Allmendinger	JTG Daugherty Racing	Chevrolet	28.681	—	—
27	13	Ty Dillon (R)	Germain Racing	Chevrolet	28.697	—	—
28	38	David Ragan	Front Row Motorsports	Ford	28.700	—	—
29	37	Chris Buescher	JTG Daugherty Racing	Chevrolet	28.825	—	—
30	32	Matt DiBenedetto	Go Fas Racing	Ford	28.891	—	—
31	34	Landon Cassill	Front Row Motorsports	Ford	29.062	—	—
32	23	Gray Gaulding (R)	BK Racing	Toyota	29.254	—	—
33	7	J. J. Yeley (i)	Tommy Baldwin Racing	Chevrolet	29.325	—	—
34	72	Cole Whitt	TriStar Motorsports	Chevrolet	29.556	—	—
35	15	Reed Sorenson	Premium Motorsports	Chevrolet	29.779	—	—
36	51	Timmy Hill (i)	Rick Ware Racing	Chevrolet	30.419	—	—
37	55	Derrike Cope	Premium Motorsports	Toyota	30.513	—	—
38	33	Jeffrey Earnhardt	Circle Sport – The Motorsports Group	Chevrolet	30.602	—	—
39	42	Kyle Larson	Chip Ganassi Racing	Chevrolet	0.000	—	—
40	83	Corey LaJoie (R)	BK Racing	Toyota	0.000	—	—
Official qualifying results

== Practice (post-qualifying) ==
=== Second practice ===
Ryan Blaney was the fastest in the second practice session with a time of 28.715 seconds and a speed of 188.055 mph (302.645 km/h).

Pos	No.	Driver	Team	Manufacturer	Time	Speed
1	21	Ryan Blaney	Wood Brothers Racing	Ford	28.715	188.055
2	77	Erik Jones (R)	Furniture Row Racing	Toyota	28.785	187.598
3	78	Martin Truex Jr.	Furniture Row Racing	Toyota	28.864	187.084
Official second practice results

=== Final practice ===
Kyle Larson was the fastest in the final practice session with a time of 28.970 seconds and a speed of 186.400 mph (299.982 km/h).

Pos	No.	Driver	Team	Manufacturer	Time	Speed
1	42	Kyle Larson	Chip Ganassi Racing	Chevrolet	28.970	186.400
2	21	Ryan Blaney	Wood Brothers Racing	Ford	29.054	185.861
3	20	Matt Kenseth	Joe Gibbs Racing	Toyota	29.182	185.046
Official final practice results

== Race ==
=== First stage ===
Kevin Harvick led the field to the green at 6:24 p.m. He got loose in Turn 3 the following lap and Kyle Busch passed him on his high side to take the lead. Exiting Turn 4 on lap 19, a piece of Jeffrey Earnhardt's car fell off and was hit by Chase Elliott's car, which burst into flames in the engine area near the start/finish line. Brad Keselowski was making a pass on Martin Truex Jr. when Elliott's car started slowing down in front of him. He attempted to veer away too late and slammed into the rear-end of Elliott, bringing out the first caution of the race and was also the competition caution despite it being scheduled for lap 25. Keselowski said afterwards that someone "broke," oil "was just...everywhere (though NASCAR stated later that there was no oil)" and that he "couldn’t turn. I ran into the back of Chase. Somebody broke in front of him and then he ran over what they broke and then he broke." Harvick exited pit road first. Jamie McMurray restarted from the tail-end of the rear for speeding.

The race settled into a green flag run after the lap 28 restart and was only interrupted by a cycle of green flag stops on lap 67, which Truex came out of as the race leader. He led unchallenged until lap 87, when Busch closed the gap to half a second. Two laps later, Busch faked him out and passed under him on the backstretch to retake the lead entering Turn 3 on lap 89. Busch went on to win the first stage at lap 100, and the second caution flew the same lap for the conclusion of the stage. As was the case with the previous caution, Harvick exited pit road first.

=== Second stage ===
Truex got the superior restart and took back the lead on lap 108. Harvick settled into second, but made an unscheduled stop for what turned out to be a loose left-rear wheel on lap 125. Rounding Turn 1 on lap 141, Matt DiBenedetto suffered a right-front tire cut and slammed the wall, bringing out the third caution. The red flag was displayed two laps later for lightning in the area, and the ensuing downpour, for over 90 minutes (1:39.56). When the red flag was lifted shortly after 9:30 p.m., the field paced a few laps under yellow to help the drying process.

The race resumed on lap 154. Jimmie Johnson reeled in Truex, but the clean air advantage Truex maintained as the race leader proved too much for Johnson to make the pass for the lead. The run lasted just 20 laps, as caution flew for the fourth time on lap 174 when Danica Patrick cut a right-side tire and got out of the racing groove, but didn't make contact with the wall. Ryan Blaney, who was running in the top-five, broke a rear axle exiting pit road, sending him to the garage for a few laps. Paul Menard stayed out to save a set of tires but got gobbled up on the restart by guys with fresh tires.

The final 21 laps of the second stage were uneventful for Truex, who drove on to win the second stage. The race went back under caution for the end of the stage at lap 200.

=== Third stage ===
When the race resumed on lap 205, it settled into a green flag run with Truex in control. It was disrupted on lap 245 when Ty Dillon blew an engine exiting Turn 4, bringing out the sixth caution. Harvick, running 10th, spun out in the oil trail left by Dillon. Kasey Kahne ran through the oil trail and slammed the wall in Turn 3. Kyle Larson also made contact with the wall in Turn 4, but made it to pit road to repair the damage. Johnson, who pitted under the prior caution, opted not to pit under this caution when Truex and the others did and assumed the race lead.

Truex got a superior restart to Johnson on the lap 252 restart. As with the previous run, this settled into a green flag run, halted when Larson suffered a right-front tire blowout and slammed the wall in Turn 1 on lap 292, bringing out the seventh caution. Larson said he was "really loose" entering (Turn) 3, "hit the wall" earlier in the stage, sustained "a lot of damage and the tire started to go down and then exploded in (Turn) 1. I just hate it that I made a mistake there in Turn 3 and got in the wall. I was not even running hard up there. I just got loose and then I hit it and it ruined our day.” Ricky Stenhouse Jr. elected not to pit and assumed the race lead who also alongside Menard tried to also save a set of tires.

The race resumed under a three-lap shootout to end the stage. Stenhouse spun his tires on the restart and clogged up the field as he fell through on the outside line. This allowed Denny Hamlin on the inside line to take the lead and win the stage. Caution flew for the eighth time on lap 300 for the conclusion of the stage.

=== Final stage ===
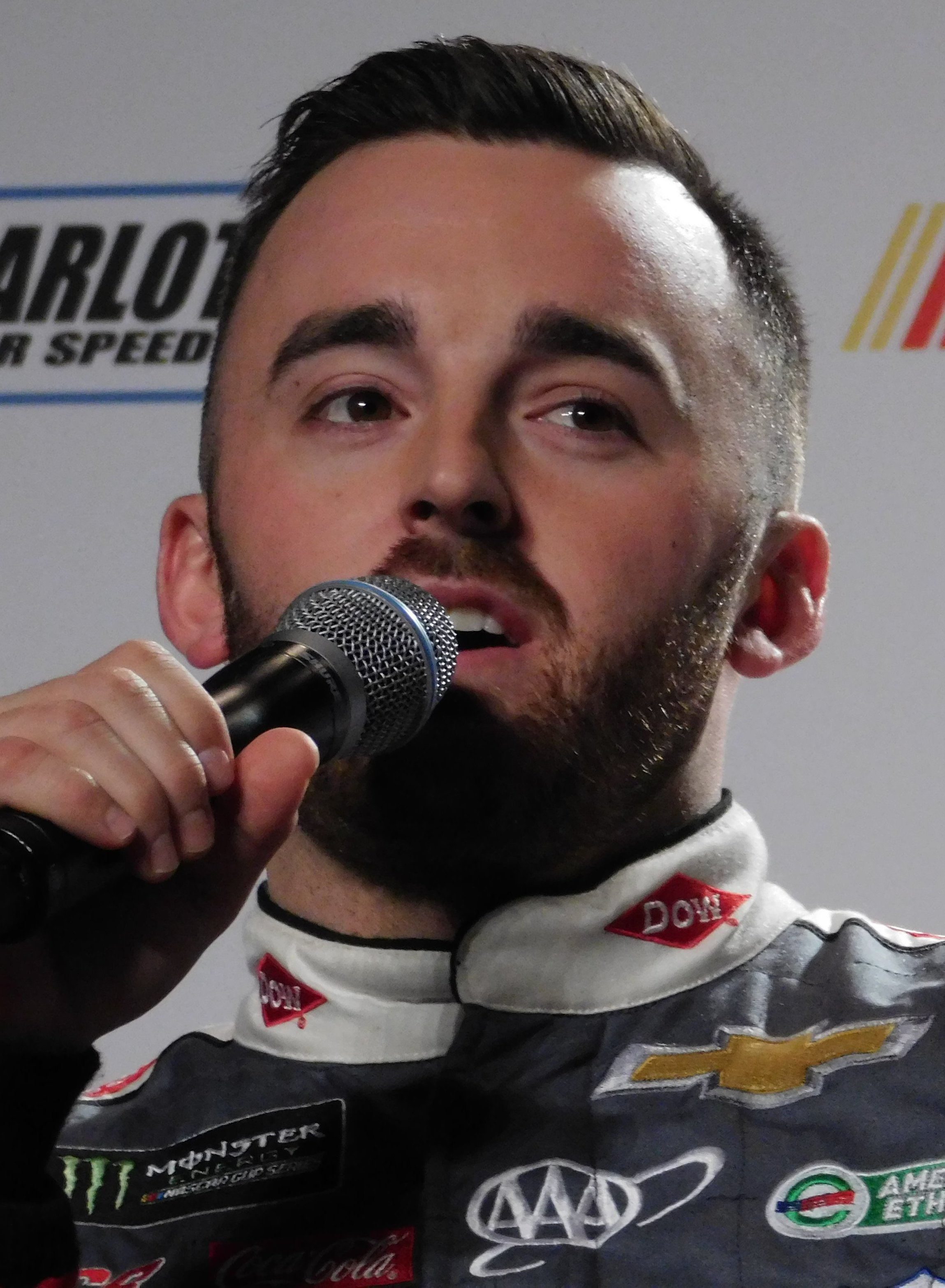
Austin Dillon scored his first career win.

Busch took the lead on the restart with 94 laps to go. Truex caught him with 85 to go and remained hot on his tail. Caution flew for the ninth time with 72 to go when Patrick hit the wall in Turn 3.

Truex took the lead back from Busch on the ensuing restart with 67 to go and held it until the final cycle of green flag stops with 33 to go. Johnson was one of seven drivers who chose, rather than pit, to play the fuel strategy card. Truex and Busch on fresher tires made their way through the field and cut the deficit to 3.5 seconds back of the race leader. With two laps to go, Johnson's fuel tank ran dry. Austin Dillon assumed the race lead and preserved enough fuel and hold off Kyle Busch and Truex Jr. to score his maiden Monster Energy NASCAR Cup Series victory and take the 3 car back to victory lane since Dale Earnhardt in 2000 at Talladega.

== Post-race ==
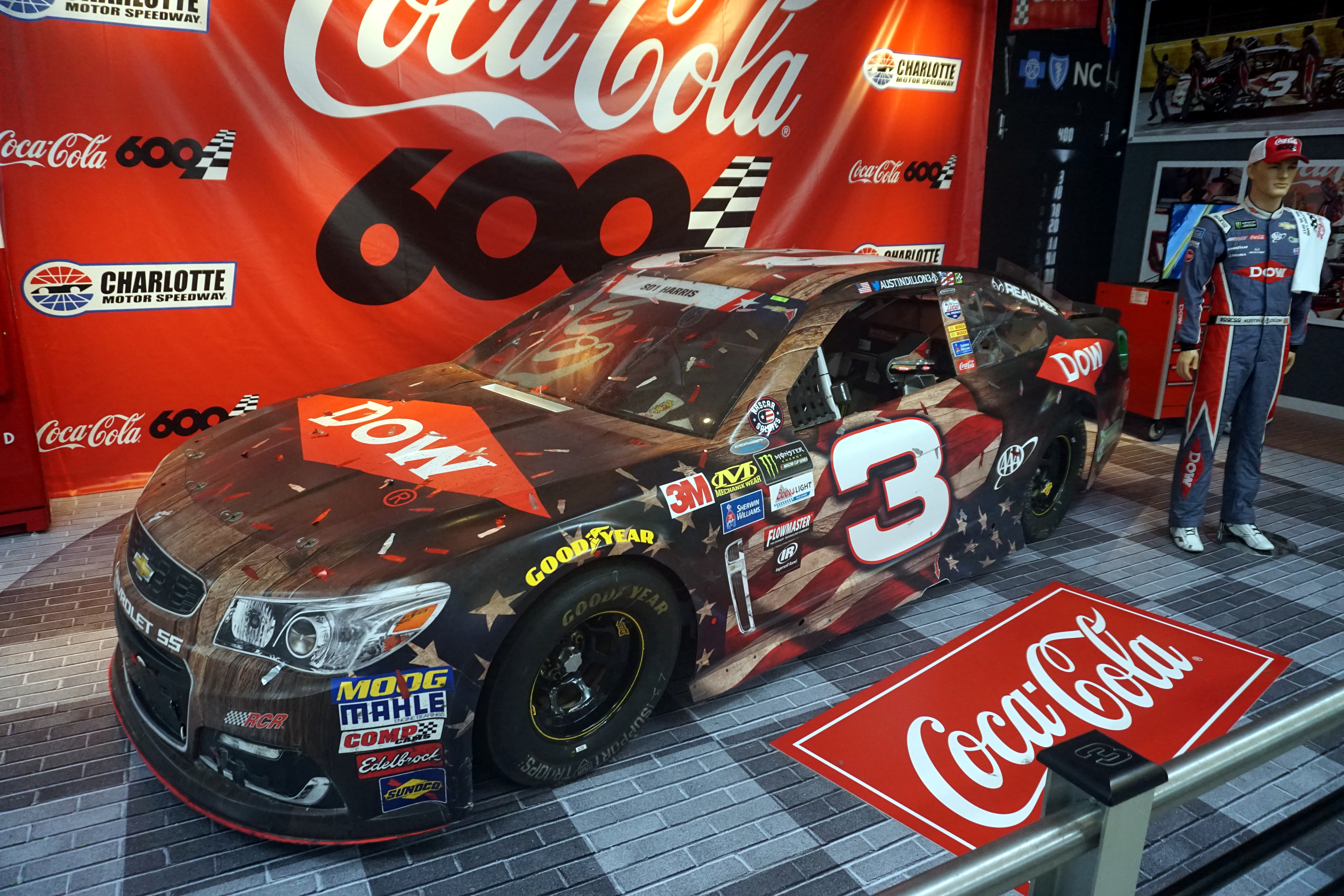
Austin Dillon's 2017 Coca-Cola 600-winning No. 3 Dow Chemical Company Chevrolet SS

=== Driver comments ===
Dillon said in victory lane that, "truthfully," the notion that he won hadn't "sunk in," and that he was "proud of all the effort that" his team "put in. I really feel like I have the best team and the best pit crew. I have no doubt in them. My grandfather has done everything he can to give us the best we can get. Sometimes I feel like we’re the small team out there trying to get everything we can. Tonight proved that 600-mile race when it came down to it, we had everything we needed. It just feels amazing.” He added that he was simply "trying to be patient with (Johnson)," and that he "could see him saving (fuel)." He believed he "saved enough early where I could attack at the end, but I tried to wait as long as possible. And when (Johnson) ran out, I figured I’d go back into save mode where I was lifting, and it worked out. I ran out at the line and it gurgled all around just to do one little spin and push it back to victory lane.”

Busch, in his post-race media availability in the Charlotte Motor Speedway deadline room, was asked if Dillon's fuel strategy move surprised him, to which he replied "I'm not surprised about anything. Congratulations.” He then slammed the microphone down on the podium and left.

Truex, who led a race-high of 233 laps on his way to a third-place finish, said it "stings a little bit," but added he couldn't "say enough about the guys on the team and everybody in Denver. He said that all "on this Bass Pro Toyota did a heck of a job today. He said that his team "missed it a little bit on our last adjustment" and "if not for that we probably could’ve gotten the 3 (Dillon). And then lapped traffic is just so tough here. There’s a few guys out there that you don’t ever know where they’re going to be when you get to the corner and it cost you so much time trying to pass them, ultimately that’s what got us. It is what it is. Like I said, we’re proud of everybody at TRD, at Toyota, Bass Pro and all the partners. Just came up a little short tonight.”

== Race results ==
=== Stage results ===
Stage 1 Laps: 100

Pos	No	Driver	Team	Manufacturer	Points
1	18	Kyle Busch	Joe Gibbs Racing	Toyota	10
2	78	Martin Truex Jr.	Furniture Row Racing	Toyota	9
3	4	Kevin Harvick	Stewart–Haas Racing	Ford	8
4	48	Jimmie Johnson	Hendrick Motorsports	Chevrolet	7
5	20	Matt Kenseth	Joe Gibbs Racing	Toyota	6
6	42	Kyle Larson	Chip Ganassi Racing	Chevrolet	5
7	21	Ryan Blaney	Wood Brothers Racing	Ford	4
8	14	Clint Bowyer	Stewart–Haas Racing	Ford	3
9	41	Kurt Busch	Stewart–Haas Racing	Ford	2
10	1	Jamie McMurray	Chip Ganassi Racing	Chevrolet	1
Official stage one results

Stage 2 Laps: 100

Pos	No	Driver	Team	Manufacturer	Points
1	78	Martin Truex Jr.	Furniture Row Racing	Toyota	10
2	48	Jimmie Johnson	Hendrick Motorsports	Chevrolet	9
3	20	Matt Kenseth	Joe Gibbs Racing	Toyota	8
4	18	Kyle Busch	Joe Gibbs Racing	Toyota	7
5	41	Kurt Busch	Stewart–Haas Racing	Ford	6
6	1	Jamie McMurray	Chip Ganassi Racing	Chevrolet	5
7	3	Austin Dillon	Richard Childress Racing	Chevrolet	4
8	77	Erik Jones (R)	Furniture Row Racing	Toyota	3
9	42	Kyle Larson	Chip Ganassi Racing	Chevrolet	2
10	11	Denny Hamlin	Joe Gibbs Racing	Toyota	1
Official stage two results

Stage 3 Laps: 100

Pos	No	Driver	Team	Manufacturer	Points
1	11	Denny Hamlin	Joe Gibbs Racing	Toyota	10
2	18	Kyle Busch	Joe Gibbs Racing	Toyota	9
3	20	Matt Kenseth	Joe Gibbs Racing	Toyota	8
4	78	Martin Truex Jr.	Furniture Row Racing	Toyota	7
5	77	Erik Jones (R)	Furniture Row Racing	Toyota	6
6	41	Kurt Busch	Stewart–Haas Racing	Ford	5
7	4	Kevin Harvick	Stewart–Haas Racing	Ford	4
8	19	Daniel Suárez (R)	Joe Gibbs Racing	Toyota	3
9	88	Dale Earnhardt Jr.	Hendrick Motorsports	Chevrolet	2
10	3	Austin Dillon	Richard Childress Racing	Chevrolet	1
Official stage three results

=== Final stage results ===
Stage 4 Laps: 100

Pos	Grid	No	Driver	Team	Manufacturer	Laps	Points
1	22	3	Austin Dillon	Richard Childress Racing	Chevrolet	400	45
2	2	18	Kyle Busch	Joe Gibbs Racing	Toyota	400	61
3	8	78	Martin Truex Jr.	Furniture Row Racing	Toyota	400	60
4	4	20	Matt Kenseth	Joe Gibbs Racing	Toyota	400	55
5	6	11	Denny Hamlin	Joe Gibbs Racing	Toyota	400	43
6	12	41	Kurt Busch	Stewart–Haas Racing	Ford	400	44
7	5	77	Erik Jones (R)	Furniture Row Racing	Toyota	400	39
8	1	4	Kevin Harvick	Stewart–Haas Racing	Ford	400	41
9	17	31	Ryan Newman	Richard Childress Racing	Chevrolet	400	28
10	19	88	Dale Earnhardt Jr.	Hendrick Motorsports	Chevrolet	400	29
11	20	19	Daniel Suárez (R)	Joe Gibbs Racing	Toyota	400	29
12	11	1	Jamie McMurray	Chip Ganassi Racing	Chevrolet	400	31
13	16	27	Paul Menard	Richard Childress Racing	Chevrolet	400	24
14	9	14	Clint Bowyer	Stewart–Haas Racing	Ford	400	26
15	13	17	Ricky Stenhouse Jr.	Roush Fenway Racing	Ford	400	22
16	18	6	Trevor Bayne	Roush Fenway Racing	Ford	400	21
17	14	48	Jimmie Johnson	Hendrick Motorsports	Chevrolet	400	36
18	26	47	A. J. Allmendinger	JTG Daugherty Racing	Chevrolet	399	19
19	21	95	Michael McDowell	Leavine Family Racing	Chevrolet	399	18
20	29	37	Chris Buescher	JTG Daugherty Racing	Chevrolet	399	17
21	23	22	Joey Logano	Team Penske	Ford	399	16
22	25	43	Regan Smith (i)	Richard Petty Motorsports	Ford	399	0
23	28	38	David Ragan	Front Row Motorsports	Ford	397	14
24	7	21	Ryan Blaney	Wood Brothers Racing	Ford	396	17
25	15	10	Danica Patrick	Stewart–Haas Racing	Ford	396	12
26	33	7	J. J. Yeley (i)	Tommy Baldwin Racing	Chevrolet	395	0
27	32	23	Gray Gaulding (R)	BK Racing	Toyota	393	10
28	31	34	Landon Cassill	Front Row Motorsports	Ford	393	9
29	36	51	Timmy Hill (i)	Rick Ware Racing	Chevrolet	384	0
30	35	15	Reed Sorenson	Premium Motorsports	Chevrolet	375	7
31	37	55	Derrike Cope	Premium Motorsports	Toyota	327	6
32	40	83	Corey LaJoie (R)	BK Racing	Toyota	315	5
33	39	42	Kyle Larson	Chip Ganassi Racing	Chevrolet	292	11
34	34	72	Cole Whitt	TriStar Motorsports	Chevrolet	290	3
35	24	5	Kasey Kahne	Hendrick Motorsports	Chevrolet	244	2
36	27	13	Ty Dillon (R)	Germain Racing	Chevrolet	242	1
37	30	32	Matt DiBenedetto	Go Fas Racing	Ford	139	1
38	3	24	Chase Elliott	Hendrick Motorsports	Chevrolet	19	1
39	10	2	Brad Keselowski	Team Penske	Ford	19	1
40	38	33	Jeffrey Earnhardt	Circle Sport – The Motorsports Group	Chevrolet	18	1
Official race results

=== Race statistics ===
- Lead changes: 10 among different drivers
- Cautions/Laps: 9 for 53
- Red flags: 1 for 1 hour, 39 minutes and 56 seconds
- Time of race: 4 hours, 19 minutes and 22 seconds
- Average speed: 138.800 miles per hour (223.377 km/h)

== Media ==
=== Television ===
Fox Sports televised the race in the United States for the seventeenth consecutive year. Mike Joy was the lap-by-lap announcer, while three-time Coca-Cola 600 winner, Jeff Gordon and five-time race winner Darrell Waltrip were the color commentators. Jamie Little, Chris Neville, Vince Welch and Matt Yocum reported from pit lane during the race.

Fox Television
Booth announcers	Pit reporters
Lap-by-lap: Mike Joy; Color-commentator: Jeff Gordon; Color commentator: Darrell Waltrip	Jamie Little; Chris Neville; Vince Welch; Matt Yocum

=== Radio ===
Radio coverage of the race was broadcast by the Performance Racing Network (PRN), and was simulcasted on Sirius XM NASCAR Radio. Doug Rice, Mark Garrow and Wendy Venturini called the race in the booth when the field raced through the quad-oval. Rob Albright reported the race from a billboard in turn 2 when the field was racing through turns 1 and 2 and halfway down the backstretch. Pat Patterson called the race from a billboard outside of turn 3 when the field raced through the other half of the backstretch and through turns 3 and 4. Brad Gillie, Brett McMillan, Jim Noble and Steve Richards were the pit reporters during the broadcast.

PRN Radio
Booth announcers	Turn announcers	Pit reporters
Lead announcer: Doug Rice; Announcer: Mark Garrow; Announcer: Wendy Venturini	Turns 1 & 2: Rob Albright; Turns 3 & 4: Pat Patterson	Brad Gillie; Brett McMilan; Jim Noble; Steve Richards

== Standings after the race ==
Drivers' Championship standings

	Pos	Driver	Points
1	1	Martin Truex Jr.	491
1	2	Kyle Larson	486 (–5)
	3	Brad Keselowski	409 (–82)
2	4	Kevin Harvick	388 (–103)
2	5	Kyle Busch	386 (–105)
1	6	Jamie McMurray	385 (–106)
3	7	Chase Elliott	362 (–129)
	8	Jimmie Johnson	359 (–132)
1	9	Clint Bowyer	343 (–148)
1	10	Joey Logano	336 (–155)
1	11	Denny Hamlin	332 (–159)
1	12	Ryan Blaney	308 (–183)
	13	Ricky Stenhouse Jr.	298 (–193)
1	14	Kurt Busch	290 (–201)
3	15	Matt Kenseth	288 (–203)
2	16	Trevor Bayne	271 (–220)
Official driver's standings

Manufacturers' Championship standings

	Pos	Manufacturer	Points
1	1	Chevrolet	435
1	2	Ford	431 (–4)
	3	Toyota	410 (–25)
Official manufacturers' standings

- Note: Only the first 16 positions are included for the driver standings.
- . – Driver has clinched a position in the Monster Energy NASCAR Cup Series playoffs.

Previous race: 2017 Go Bowling 400	Monster Energy NASCAR Cup Series; 2017 season	Next race: 2017 AAA 400 Drive for Autism
