= Austin Dillon =

American racing driver (born 1990)

- Dillon at Las Vegas Motor Speedway in 2026
- Born: Austin Reed Dillon; April 27, 1990 (age 36); Welcome, North Carolina, U.S.
- Height: 5 ft 8 in (1.73 m)
- Weight: 179 lb (81 kg)
- Achievements: 2011 NASCAR Camping World Truck Series Champion; 2013 NASCAR Nationwide Series Champion; 2014 Daytona 500 pole winner 2017 Coca-Cola 600 Winner; 2018 Daytona 500 Winner; 2021 Bluegreen Vacations Duels Winner
- Awards: 2008 NASCAR K&N Pro Series East Rookie of the Year; 2010 NASCAR Camping World Truck Series Rookie of the Year; 2011 NASCAR Camping World Truck Series Most Popular Driver; 2012 NASCAR Nationwide Series Rookie of the Year; 2019 Little League Hall of Excellence

NASCAR Cup Series career
- 480 races run over 16 years
- Car no., team: No. 3 (Richard Childress Racing)
- 2026 position: 24th
- Best finish: 11th (2017, 2020, 2022)
- First race: 2011 Hollywood Casino 400 (Kansas)
- Last race: 2026 Season Finale 400 (Homestead)
- First win: 2017 Coca-Cola 600 (Charlotte)
- Last win: 2025 Cook Out 400 (Richmond)
Wins	Top tens	Poles
6	91	6

NASCAR O'Reilly Auto Parts Series career
- 157 races run over 17 years
- 2026 position: 88th
- Best finish: 1st (2013)
- First race: 2008 Emerson Radio 250 (Richmond)
- Last race: 2026 Andy's Frozen Custard 340 (Texas)
- First win: 2012 Feed the Children 300 (Kentucky)
- Last win: 2018 LTi Printing 250 (Michigan)
Wins	Top tens	Poles
9	107	17

NASCAR FedEx Freight Truck Series career
- 73 races run over 11 years
- 2022 position: 95th
- Best finish: 1st (2011)
- First race: 2009 Lucas Oil 200 (Iowa)
- Last race: 2022 DoorDash 250 (Sonoma)
- First win: 2010 Lucas Oil 200 (Iowa)
- Last win: 2015 UNOH 175 (New Hampshire)
Wins	Top tens	Poles
7	48	13

NASCAR Canada Series career
- 1 race run over 1 year
- 2012 position: 45th
- Best finish: 45th (2012)
- First race: 2012 NAPA Autopro 100 (Montreal)
Wins	Top tens	Poles
0	1	0

ARCA Menards Series career
- 5 races run over 3 years
- Best finish: 50th (2009)
- First race: 2008 Carolina 500 (Rockingham)
- Last race: 2013 Scott 160 (Road America)
Wins	Top tens	Poles
0	4	0

ARCA Menards Series East career
- 16 races run over 3 years
- Best finish: 2nd (2008)
- First race: 2008 An American Revolution 150 (Greenville-Pickens)
- Last race: 2014 Bully Hill Vineyards 125 (Watkins Glen)
- First win: 2008 An American Revolution 150 (Greenville-Pickens)
Wins	Top tens	Poles
1	12	1

ARCA Menards Series West career
- 4 races run over 4 years
- Best finish: 38th (2019)
- First race: 2009 Jimmie Johnson Foundation 150 (Phoenix)
- Last race: 2019 Procore 200 (Sonoma)
Wins	Top tens	Poles
0	2	0
- Statistics up to date as of November 8, 2026.

Austin Reed Dillon (born April 27, 1990) is an American professional stock car racing driver. He competes full-time in the NASCAR Cup Series, driving the No. 3 Chevrolet Camaro ZL1 for Richard Childress Racing. He is the grandson of RCR team owner Richard Childress, the older brother of Ty Dillon, who competes full-time in the NASCAR Cup Series, and the son of Mike Dillon, a former racing driver who currently works as RCR's general manager.

Dillon is the 2011 NASCAR Camping World Truck Series champion, the 2013 NASCAR Nationwide Series champion, and the winner of the 2018 Daytona 500. He also won the Rookie of the Year award in both series in the year before he won the championship (2010 and 2012, respectively). He also holds the record for most consecutive poles in the Xfinity Series with four. Since 2022, Dillon has also been the general manager of the Carolina Cowboys, a Professional Bull Riders team.

== Racing career ==
=== 2005–2007: Beginnings ===
Dillon began his racing career in Bandolero and Legends. A year later, he started dirt track racing at dirt late model racer Dale McDowell's school.

=== 2008: Camping World East Series ===
Dillon was the 2008 Rookie of the Year in the NASCAR Camping World East Series. He ran the full schedule in the No. 3 Chevrolet initially driving for Andy Santerre Motorsports; he eventually moved under his grandfather's Richard Childress Racing banner after four races. Dillon scored one win at Greenville-Pickens Speedway, one pole and ten top-ten finishes in thirteen races.

=== 2009–2011: Camping World Truck Series ===
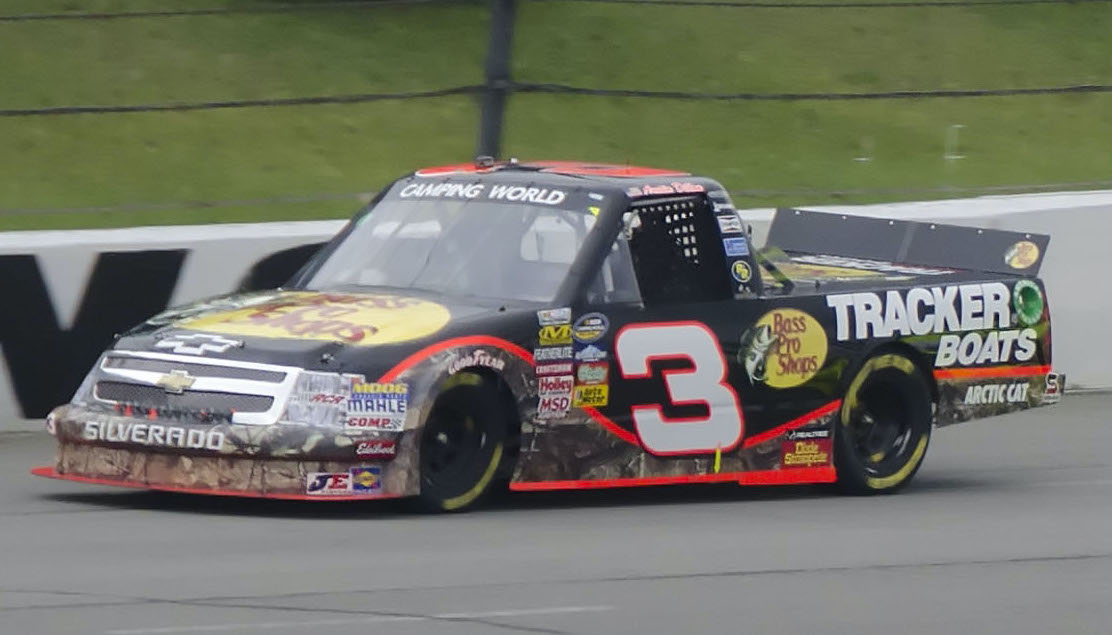
Dillon racing at Pocono Raceway in 2011

He made his first Camping World Truck Series start at Iowa Speedway, driving the No. 3 truck. This was the first time that the No. 3 had appeared in any of the three major series since Dale Earnhardt Jr. used it in the Busch Series back in 2002.

Dillon was supposed to start the Mountain Dew 250 at Talladega Superspeedway during the 2009 NASCAR Camping World Truck Series season, but the truck failed inspection, thus his time was removed and he failed to qualify for the race. Dillon would drive the No. 3 truck full-time in 2010 for Rookie of the Year, with sponsorship from Bass Pro Shops.

Despite crashing out early at Daytona, Dillon got his first career pole at Texas Motor Speedway in June and finished third, leading twenty laps. On July 11, Dillon scored his first career NASCAR victory in the Lucas Oil 200 at Iowa Speedway, winning a Truck Series race in a truck wearing the No. 3 for the first time since Bryan Reffner won for Team Menard in 2000 at Texas Motor Speedway. He ended the season with two wins and seven poles, earning him Rookie of the Year honors.

In 2011, Dillon scored his first win of the year at Nashville Superspeedway. Dillon scored his second win of 2011 at Chicagoland Speedway, beating Kevin Harvick and Kyle Busch. After rain shortened the season finale at the Homestead-Miami Speedway, Dillon was crowned the 2011 NASCAR Camping World Truck Series Champion. He also won the 2011 CWTS Most Popular Driver Award. In 2012, he moved up to the Nationwide Series full-time, driving the No. 3 Chevrolet for RCR.

=== 2011–present: Cup Series and Xfinity Series ===
Dillon made his first career start in the NASCAR Sprint Cup Series on October 9, 2011, in the Hollywood Casino 400 at Kansas Speedway. He finished 26th in his No. 98 Camping World Curb/Agajanian Racing Chevrolet Impala.

On November 4, 2011, Richard Childress Racing announced that Dillon would be moving up to the Nationwide Series in 2012, driving the No. 3 that Dale Earnhardt made famous, with sponsorship from AdvoCare, American Ethanol, and Bass Pro Shops.

==== 2012 ====
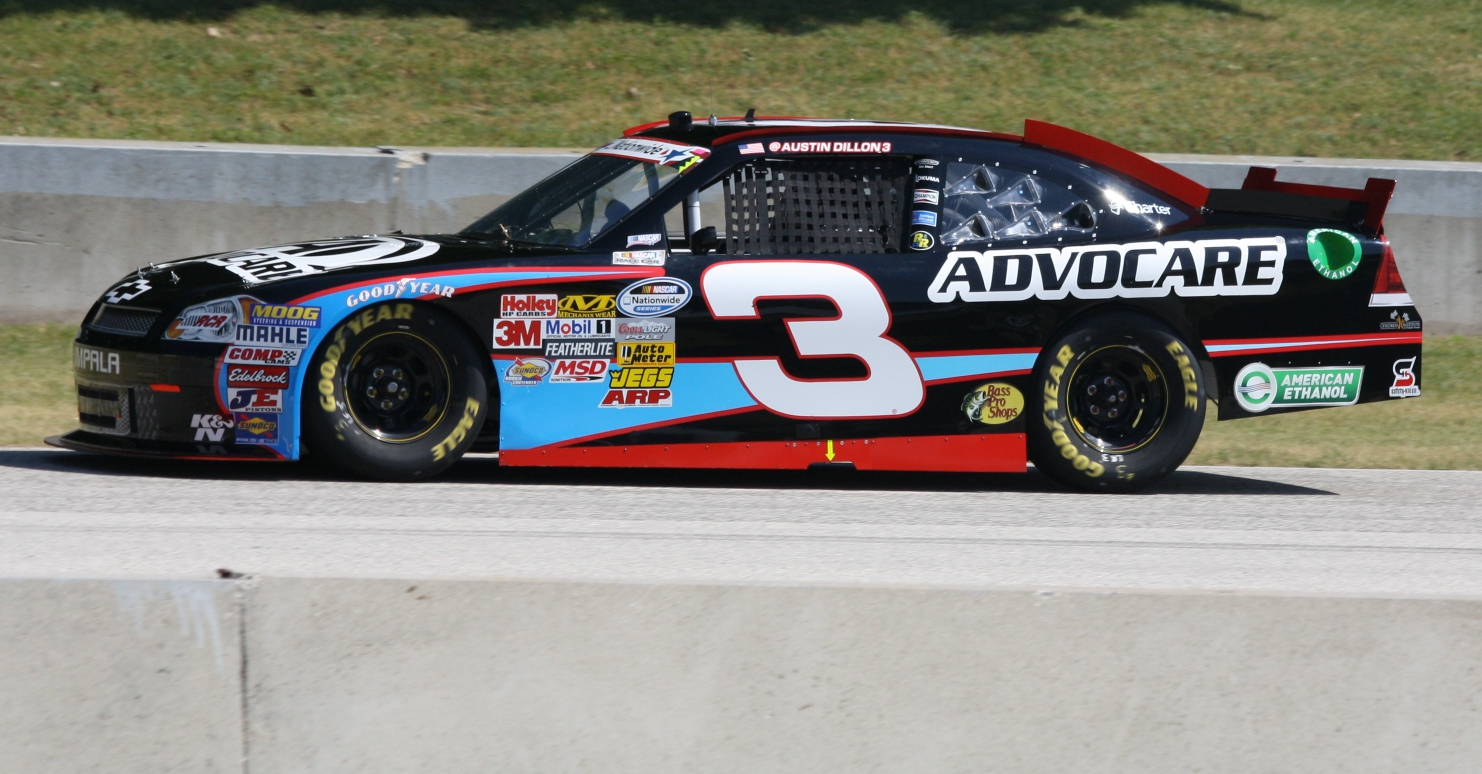
Dillon's 2012 Nationwide Series car at Road America

Dillon competed in the Sprint Cup Series on a limited basis in 2012, starting at Michigan International Speedway in June, driving the No. 33 Chevrolet for Richard Childress Racing, starting 21st and finishing 24th.

On June 29, 2012, Dillon recorded his first Nationwide Series win at Kentucky Speedway; he dominated the race by leading all but 8 laps and won by over 9.8 seconds over second place. However, NASCAR officials announced the car had failed post-race inspection because the rear ride heights were too low.

Dillon also participated in one race in the NASCAR Canadian Tire Series at Circuit Gilles-Villeuneuve in Montreal in August 2012. Dillon finished seventh while driving the No. 4 car for Fitzpatrick Motorsports.

==== 2013: Nationwide Series champion ====
Dillon announced in August 2012 that he would continue to drive full-time in the Nationwide Series for 2013, with Advocare as the primary sponsor for the full season, along with running seven Sprint Cup Series races that year, including the 2013 Daytona 500, where he qualified eighth, but crashed late in the race, relegating him to a 31st-place finish. In January 2013 it was announced that some of Dillon's Sprint Cup races that season would be in Phoenix Racing's No. 51 Chevrolet.

Dillon returned to the Truck Series for the inaugural Mudsummer Classic at Eldora Speedway, leading a race-high 63 laps, and won after a green–white–checkered finish. The truck, the trophy and the famed piece of dirt track are on display at NASCAR Hall of Fame. Later in the year Dillon substituted for the ailing Brennan Newberry in the Truck Series race at Chicagoland Speedway.

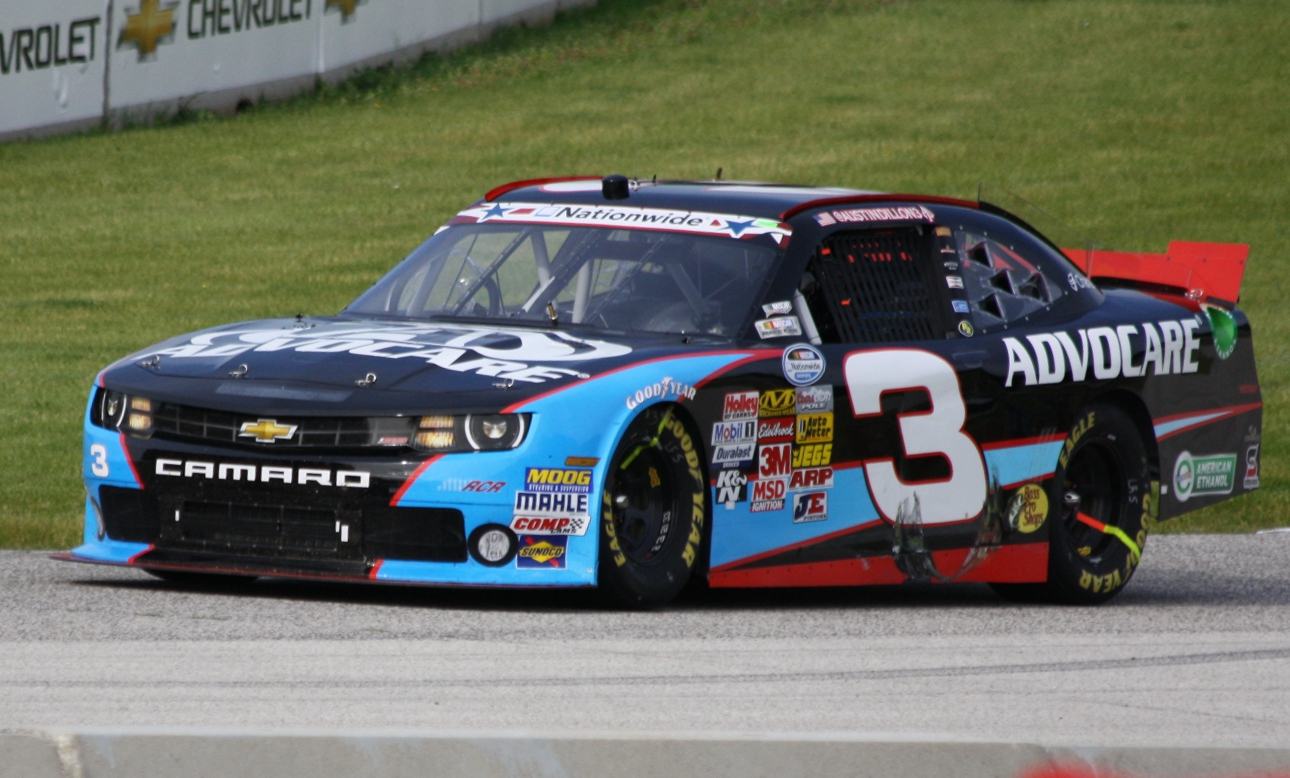
2013 championship car at Road America

In early August 2013, it was announced that Dillon would substitute for Tony Stewart in the No. 14 Stewart–Haas Racing Chevrolet at Michigan due to Stewart's leg injury; he would also drive the car at Talladega Superspeedway in October. In Dillon's run at Talladega, he performed well during the event, and was running in the top five for most of the day; at the white flag, Dillon was third behind Jamie McMurray and Dale Earnhardt Jr. and was about to give Earnhardt Jr. a push for an attempt to make a winning pass when he was turned by Ricky Stenhouse Jr., slammed the backstretch wall, then was sent airborne when struck hard in the rear bumper by Casey Mears.

On November 16, 2013, Dillon won the NASCAR Nationwide Series Championship with a twelfth place finish in the season finale at Homestead–Miami Speedway. Dillon's series championship was unusual because he did not win any races during the season; this marked the first time in any of NASCAR's three national series that a season champion went winless.

==== 2014: Full-time in Cup Series ====
On December 11, 2013, it was announced by RCR that Dillon would drive the No. 3 Chevrolet in the NASCAR Sprint Cup Series with Cheerios and Dow Chemical Company as the primary sponsors. It would be the No. 3 car's first Sprint Cup appearance in thirteen years.

During 2014 Daytona 500 qualifying, Dillon clinched the pole position with a speed of 196.019 mph (315.462 km/h). This was the fourth time that the No. 3 was on the pole for the Daytona 500.

After a long streak of bad finishes, Dillon rebounded with a top-five in the 2014 Coke Zero 400. Dillon ended the 2014 Cup season as one of only two drivers to have been running at the finish of every race during the season, the other being Jeff Gordon. He finished second in the rookie of the year standings to Kyle Larson.

==== 2015 ====
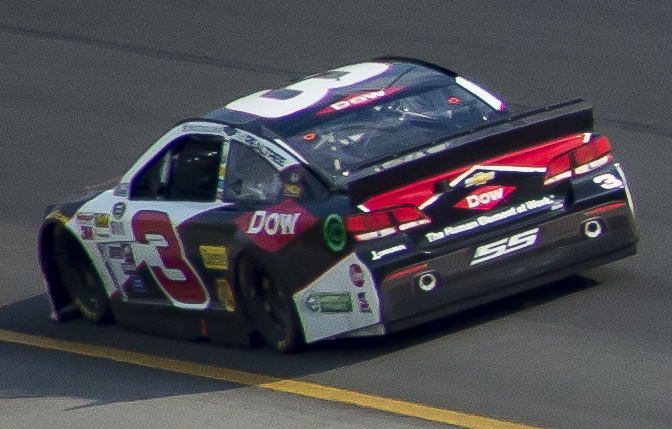
Dillon racing at Michigan International Speedway in 2015

In the first half of the 2015 season, Dillon struggled in the Cup Series, scoring only one top-ten finish (tenth in the Spring race at Bristol). In the Xfinity series, however, Dillon scored two wins, the first coming at Las Vegas and the other at Charlotte. In both races, he dominated leading the most laps. In the summer return to Daytona, Dillon had an up and down weekend. In the Xfinity race, he won after his teammate and the dominant car of Brian Scott crashed out of the race late in the going. In the Coke Zero 400 on July 5, coming to the checkered flag, Dillon was hit in the left front tire by the spinning car of Denny Hamlin and from behind by Clint Bowyer, causing him to flip into the catch fence over two rows of cars. The car hit the fence at about 190 miles per hour and came to an almost complete stop on its roof before he was hit again by a spinning Brad Keselowski. Dillon climbed out of the car unharmed, except for a bruised tailbone and a bruise on his forearm, but five fans were injured by flying debris. Dillon was credited with a seventh-place finish.

After a disappointing season, with only one top-five and five top-ten finishes, Dillon closed out the 2015 Sprint Cup season standings in 21st place. However, Dillon did manage to win four Xfinity races, even though he was running only a part-time schedule.

==== 2016: First playoff appearance ====
Dillon competed part-time in the Xfinity Series in 2016, splitting the No. 2 of RCR with six other drivers. On the final lap of the Xfinity race in Fontana, Dillon battled with Kyle Busch, whose car had cut a left front tire, the two making contact as they approached the finish. Dillon's car hit the turn four wall but was able to hang on for the win. Then at the second Bristol race, Dillon won after Kyle Busch and Brad Keselowski both wrecked late in the going.

In the Cup Series, Dillon won two Poles, the first coming at Auto Club and the second coming at the second Texas race. At the first Talladega Cup race, Dillon scored a career-best 3rd-place finish after getting caught up in two big crashes. He then also qualified for his first Chase; though he advanced out of the Round of 16, he was eliminated in the following round.

==== 2017: First Cup win ====
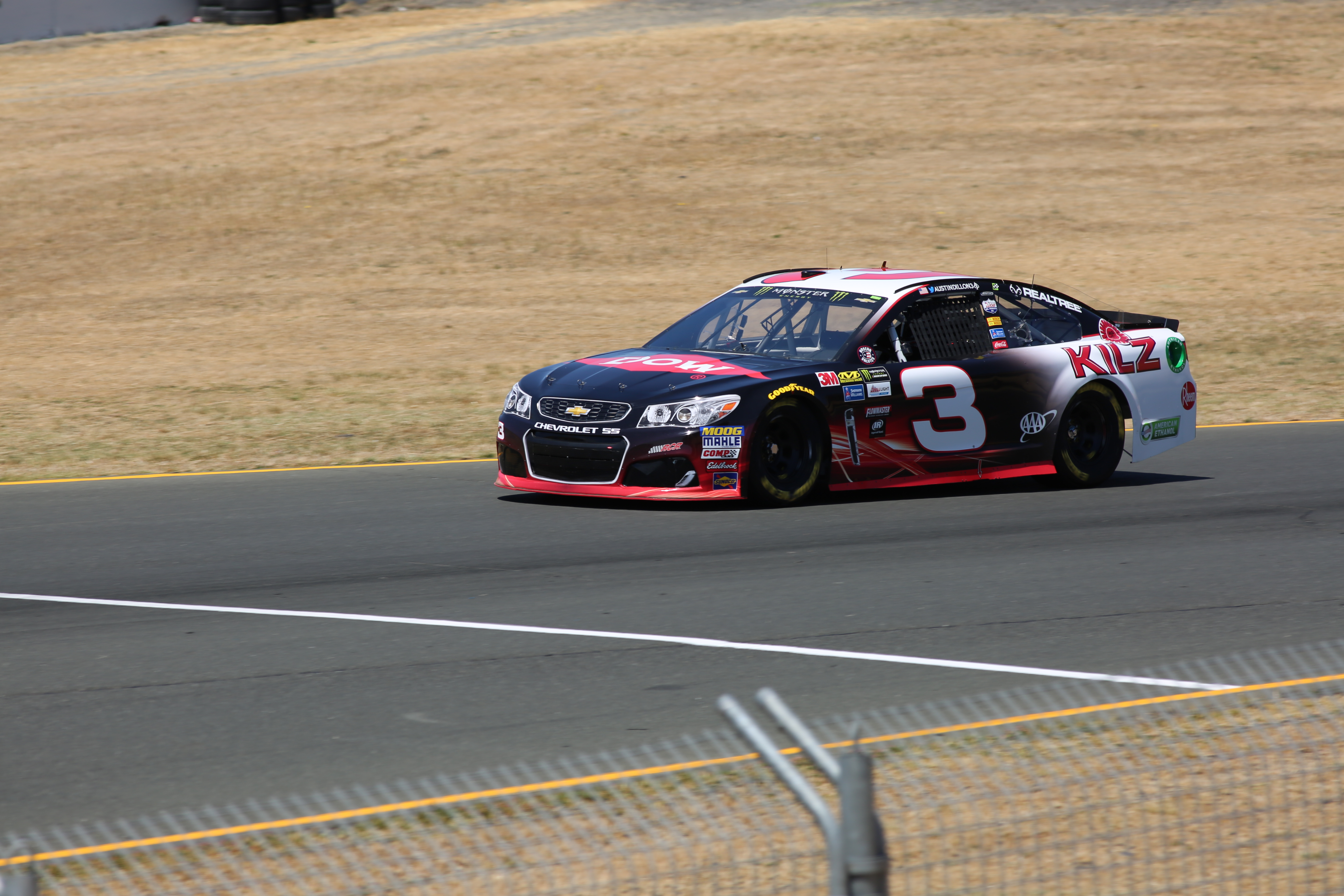
Dillon during qualifying for the 2017 Toyota/Save Mart 350.

Dillon opened the season with a fourth-place finish in his Can-Am Duel, where he pushed Denny Hamlin past the dominant car of Dale Earnhardt Jr. to win the race.

During an Xfinity Series race at Phoenix Raceway, Dillon was parked by NASCAR for wrecking rookie Cole Custer under caution after Custer slid into Dillon earlier in the race. After being parked, Dillon was not the target of any more penalties.

When NASCAR returned to Martinsville for the first time in 2017, Dillon scored a season-best fifth place outing. This is his first top-five and top-ten finish of 2017. At Texas, Dillon was unable to start the Cup race on the lead lap due to a broken track bar that put him eleven laps down. He finished 33rd.

After the Kansas race, his crew chief Slugger Labbe mutually separated from RCR. Justin Alexander became the new crew chief and started his role at the Open.

After struggling early on in the Coca-Cola 600, Dillon would finally earn his first career Cup Series win after passing Jimmie Johnson, who ran out of fuel on lap 399 and held off Kyle Busch and Martin Truex Jr. It was the first win for a No. 3 car in Cup since October 15, 2000, when Dale Earnhardt won at Talladega.

After the Charlotte race, Dillon would not score another top-five finish in the Cup series until a fourth

place run at the Southern 500 at Darlington. He went to finish a career-best eleventh in the final point standings despite getting eliminated after the round of 16.

In June, Dillon became a color commentator for NASCAR on Fox's broadcast of the Xfinity Series race at Michigan.

==== 2018: Daytona 500 win ====
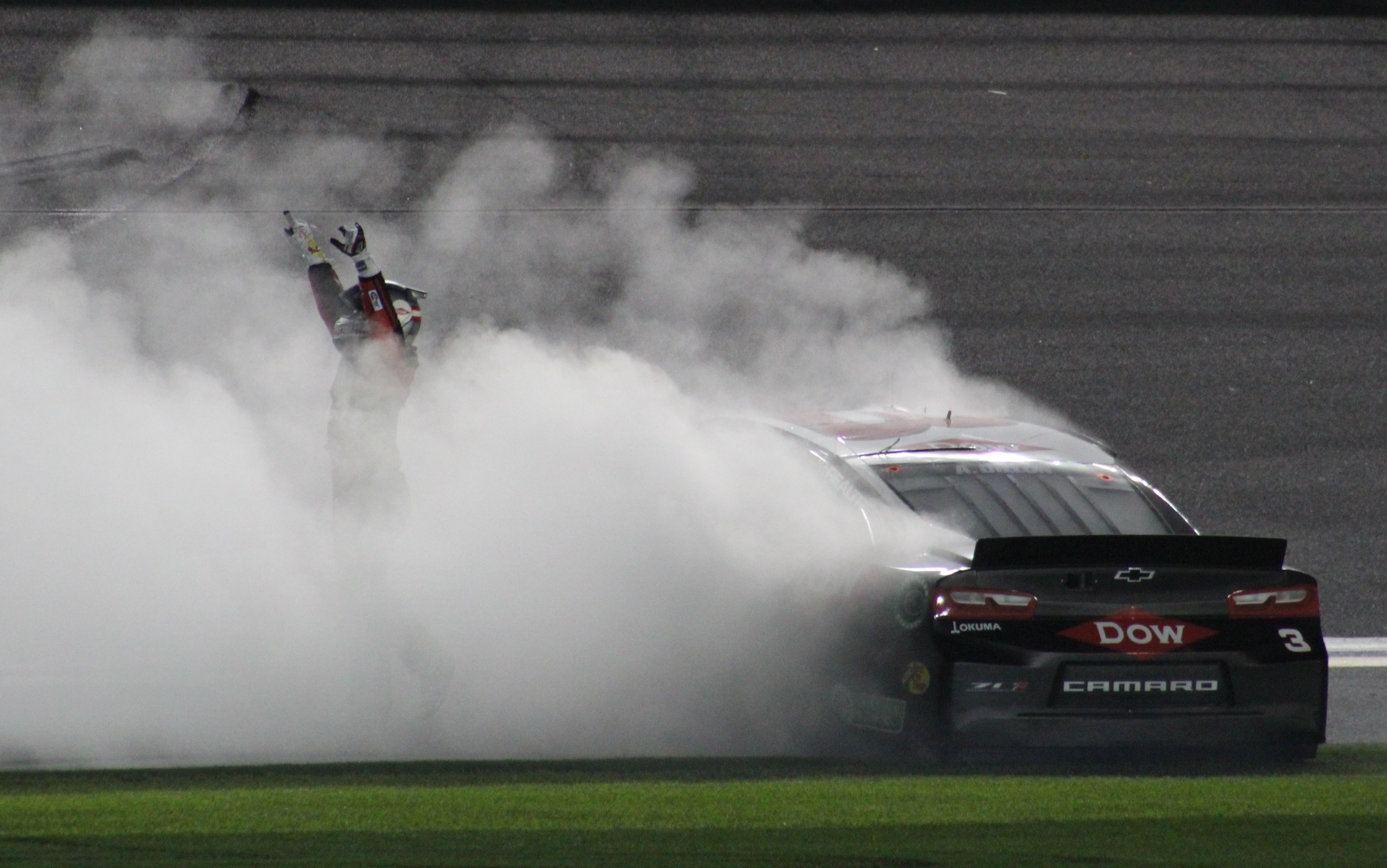
Dillon celebrating after winning the 2018 Daytona 500

In 2018, Dillon returned the No. 3 to Victory Lane in the Cup Series. He won the 2018 Daytona 500, after coming from a lap down within twenty laps to go to second on the final lap. He hit Aric Almirola in the right rear after Almirola tried blocking him, sending him into the outside wall. The win happened twenty years after Dale Earnhardt's only Daytona 500 win, and it was also seventeen years to the day of Earnhardt's death. Despite the win and a guaranteed spot in the Playoffs, Dillon struggled to stay consistent throughout the season with two top-fives and five top-ten finishes. He was eliminated in the Round of 16 after hitting the outside wall twice at the Charlotte Roval race and finished the season thirteenth in points.

In the Xfinity Series, Dillon scored his one-hundredth career top-ten Xfinity Series finish at California, which came as a fourth-place outing. He won the Xfinity race at Michigan in June after rain ended the race prematurely on lap 91. It was the first Xfinity Series win for Dillon since the August Bristol race in 2016, and the first for RCR's Xfinity team since 2016 at Road America with Michael McDowell. Dillon also drove the No. 10 Chevrolet for Kaulig Racing at Indianapolis. This was the second time Dillon raced in an Xfinity event outside RCR. It is also the first time Kaulig Racing fielded two cars in a race.

==== 2019 ====
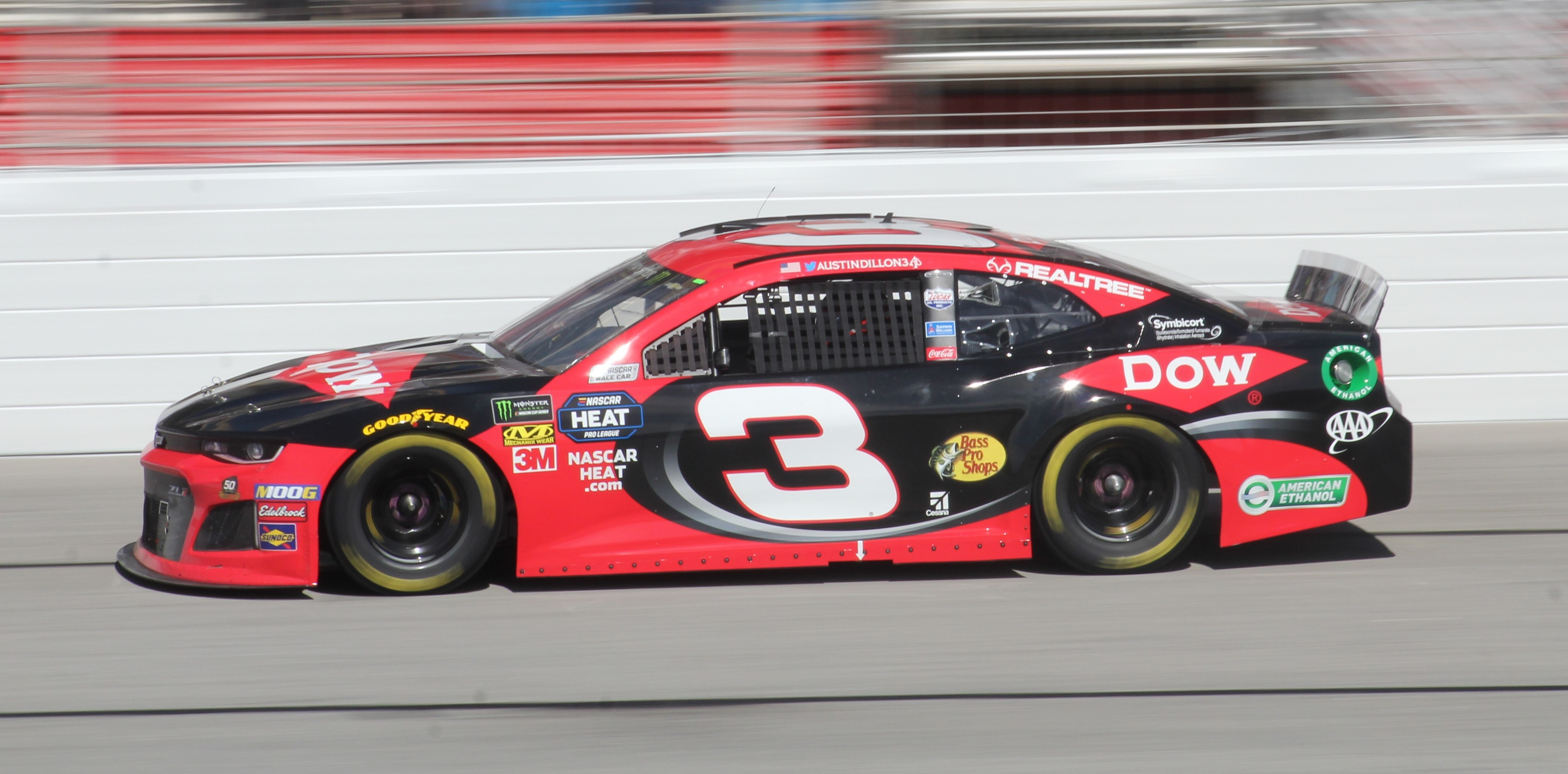
Dillon racing at Atlanta Motor Speedway in 2019

For 2019, Dillon began having Danny Stockman atop the pit box for the Cup Series. Stockman was Dillon's crew chief in the Truck Series and Nationwide Series when he won his NASCAR Championship titles in 2011 and 2013.

Dillon and RCR showed qualifying speed early in the season, winning pole awards at Auto Club and Talladega. Then at Michigan, Dillon managed to get his first career stage win in the Cup Series by winning the second stage.

He performed well at the July Daytona race, leading the most laps (46) and winning stage 2. However, with forty laps to go, as severe weather was approaching the track, Clint Bowyer made contact with Dillon causing a multi-car accident. Dillon finished with a DNF in 33rd place.

Dillon failed to make the playoffs for the first time since 2015 as he fell outside the top twenty in points. He finished 21st in the final points standings, tying his lowest in a full-time season with zero top-fives for the first time in his career.

==== 2020: Return to the playoffs ====
On October 28, 2019, Stockman announced he would step down as the crew chief of the No. 3 team at the end of the 2019 season. Justin Alexander returned as the No. 3 team's crew chief in 2020 after having served that position in the 2017 and 2018 seasons.

At Las Vegas, Dillon managed to score his first top-five finish of 2020 and first since the 2018 Consumers Energy 400, coming home fourth.

On July 19, Dillon broke an 88-race winless streak by claiming his 3rd career victory at the 2020 O'Reilly Auto Parts 500 at Texas Motor Speedway. RCR teammate Tyler Reddick finished second to secure an RCR 1–2 finish for the first time since the 2011 Good Sam Club 500. It was Dillon's first victory where he led more than the final two laps, as he took the lead with 23 to go and held off Reddick over several restarts.

On August 15, it was announced that Dillon tested positive for COVID-19, forcing him to miss the Go Bowling 235 at Daytona; Kaz Grala served as his replacement for the race. Dillon returned to the No. 3 for the following week at Dover.

At the Southern 500, Dillon had to start from the rear as a result of unapproved adjustments, later had to take an unscheduled pit stop for a flat tire, and rallied to finish second. In the following race, Richmond, Dillon recorded a fourth-place finish, marking the first time in his Cup Series career that he finished in the top five in consecutive races. After a twelfth place finish at the Bristol Night Race a week later, Dillon advanced to the Round of 12 for the second time in his career since 2016. He was eliminated following the Charlotte Roval. Dillon finished eleventh in the points standings.

==== 2021 ====
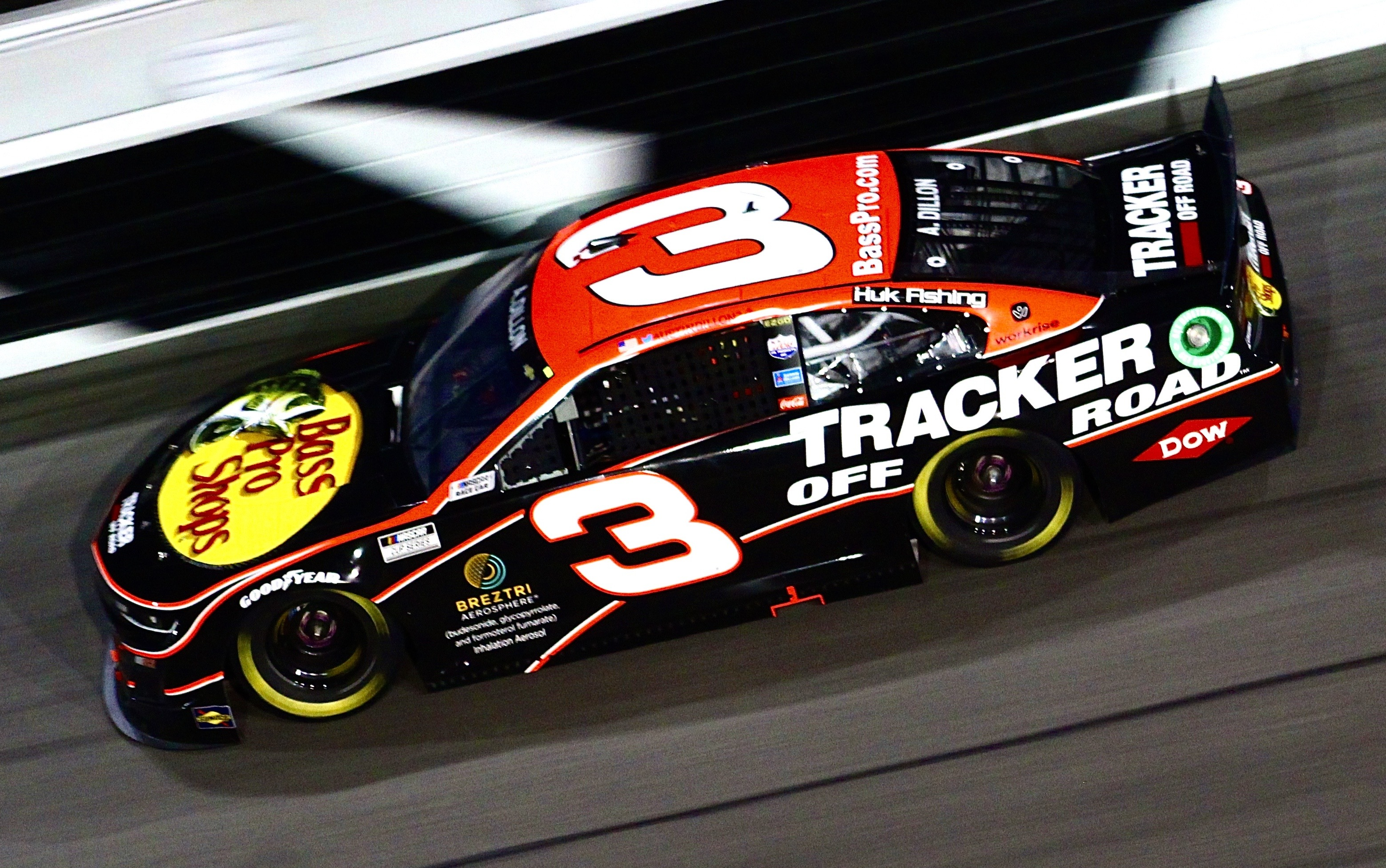
Dillon racing at Daytona International Speedway in 2021

Dillon began the 2021 season with a win in his Duel for the Daytona 500 by passing Bubba Wallace on the final lap, which enabled him to start fourth for the 500. Dillon would go on to lead seven laps in the 500 and finish in third place after avoiding a last-lap crash, assuming the points lead for the first time in his career.

In the Xfinity COTA event, Dillon returned to the Xfinity racing for Ronnie and Dillon Bassett's team. He managed to qualify the No. 77 and finished thirteenth. Later on in July, Dillon returned to the Xfinity Series at Atlanta when he served as an injury replacement for Michael Annett in the No. 1 JR Motorsports Chevrolet. He also drove in the No. 23 for Our Motorsports for two races, as well as Jordan Anderson Racing's No. 31 for a race.

At Michigan in August, Dillon was turned into the wall by Brad Keselowski just after stage 2 ended. Dillon nearly flipped on impact and was on his side for a couple of seconds. He was unharmed and climbed out of the car.

==== 2022: Playoff upset ====
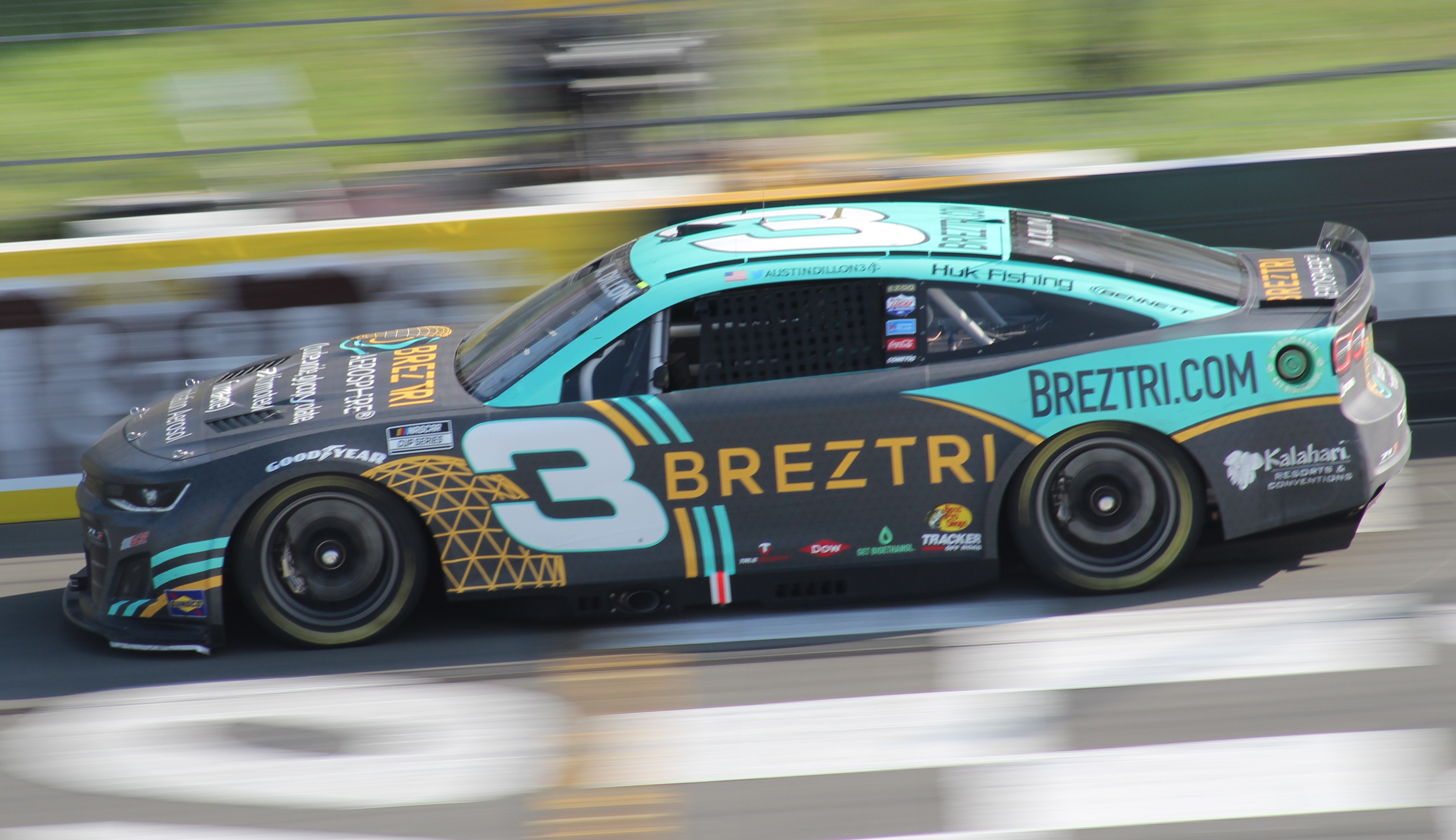
Dillon's No. 3 car at Pocono Raceway in 2022

Dillon started the 2022 season with a 25th place finish at the 2022 Daytona 500. He scored three top-three finishes at Fontana, Martinsville, and Talladega. On March 27, Dillon recorded his first top-10 finish in a Cup Series road course race as he finished tenth at the Circuit of the Americas. At New Hampshire, he and Brad Keselowski engaged in an on-road altercation during a caution lap. Dillon won the Coke Zero Sugar 400 at Daytona to clinch a spot in the playoffs in a 1-2 finish with teammate Tyler Reddick. He assumed the lead after a huge wreck caused by rainfall took out much of the lead pack on lap 138; Dillon, who was sixteenth at the time, was the only driver in the lead pack to not be involved in the accident. Dillon was eliminated in the Round of 16 after being involved in a multi-car pileup at the Bristol night race. Dillon would later score two consecutive top-ten outings at the Charlotte Roval, giving him his second-career road course top-ten finish, (tenth place) and then a tenth place result at Las Vegas. Then, Dillon scored a career-first three consecutive top-ten finishes by coming home in fourth place at Homestead. He finished the season eleventh in the points standings.

On April 8, Dillon revealed that he would run the 2022 Pinty's Truck Race on Dirt at Bristol Motor Speedway in a Young's Motorsports truck. Although Dillon stated that he thought he would drive the team's No. 02 truck, the race is on Kaz Grala's schedule of races in that truck, so Dillon drove the No. 20 for that race.

In the Xfinity Series, Dillon drove for Big Machine Racing at the Charlotte Xfinity race, finishing 31st.

==== 2023 ====
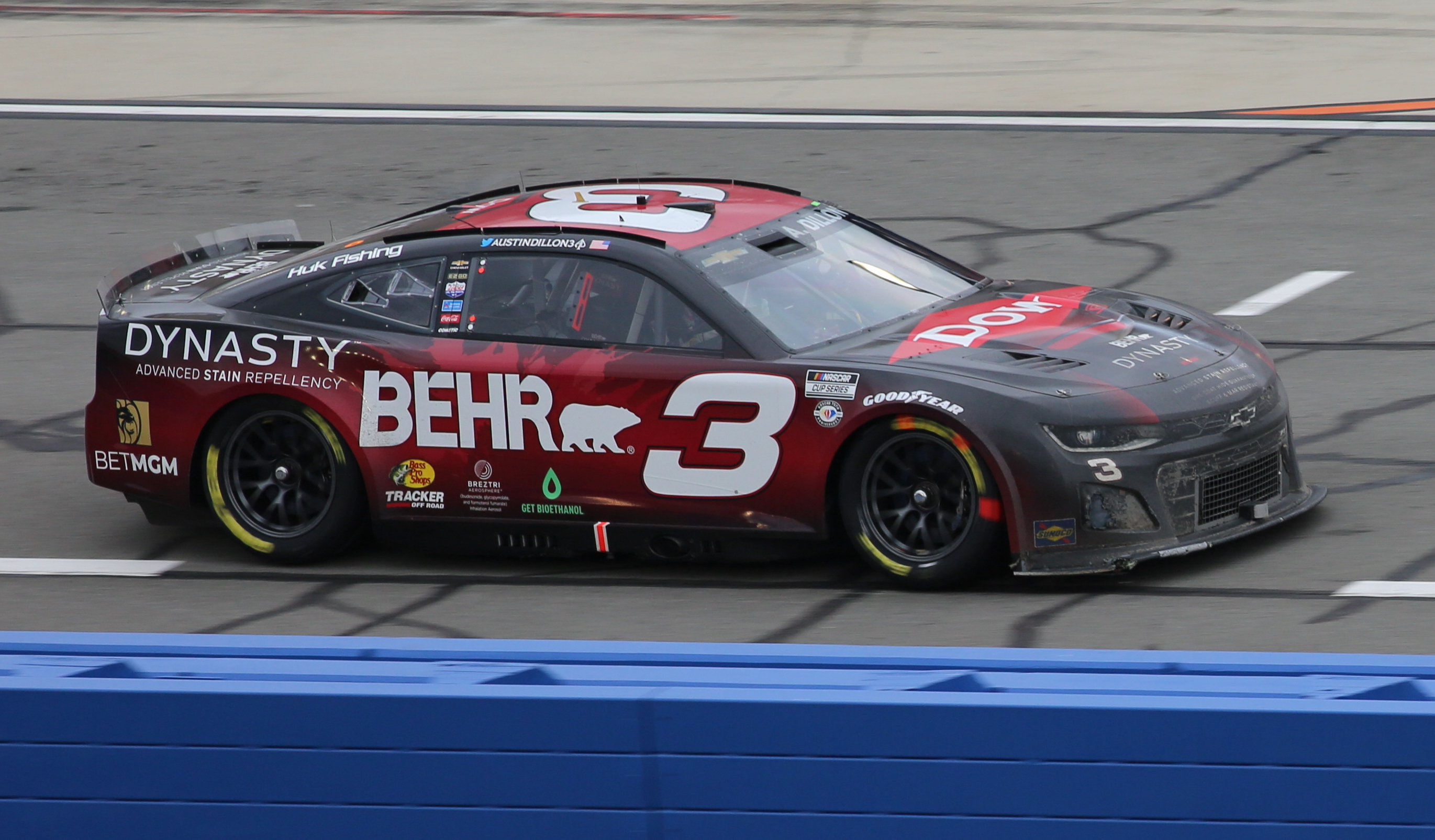
Dillon in the No. 3 at Auto Club Speedway in 2023

On October 28, 2022, RCR announced that Keith Rodden would be on the pit box for Dillon starting in 2023. Alexander announced shortly before this announcement that he would be stepping down from the crew chief role on the No. 3 car. Dillon started the season with a 33rd place DNF at the 2023 Daytona 500. Following the Martinsville race, the No. 3 was served an L1 penalty after NASCAR's R&D Center discovered an unapproved underwing assembly during post-inspection. As a result, the team was docked sixty driver and owner points and five playoff points. In addition, Rodden was fined US$75,000 and suspended for two races. Because of this, as well as a string of poor finishes, Dillon ended the 2023 season 29th in the standings.

==== 2024: Winless streak snapped in controversial fashion ====
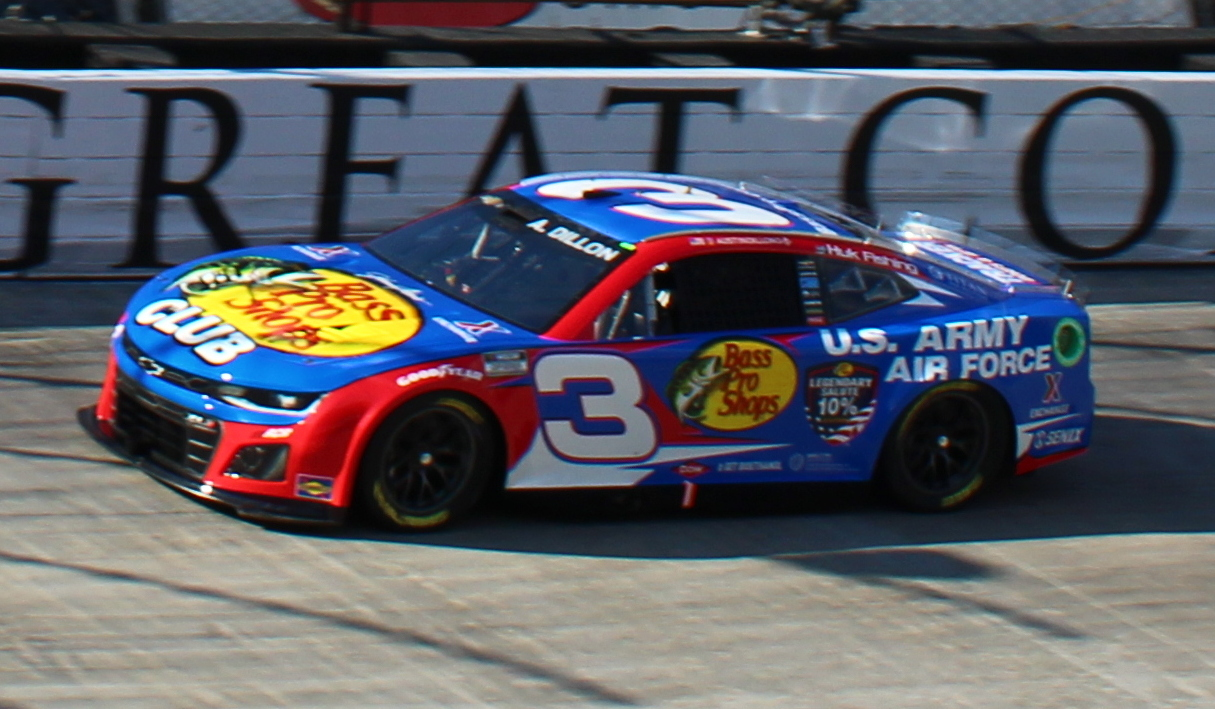
Dillon's No. 3 car at Bristol Motor Speedway in 2024

During the 2024 season, Alexander returned as crew chief starting at the Martinsville spring race. At the Richmond summer race, Dillon broke a 68-race winless drought after spinning out Joey Logano and Denny Hamlin on the final lap, a move which garnered criticism from both Logano and Hamlin. Three days later, it was announced that NASCAR had encumbered the win, docked Dillon 25 driver points and stripped him of his playoff eligibility. Following the Martinsville playoff race, the No. 3 was docked 50 owner and driver points and Dillon and the team were each fined US$100,000 for race manipulation, when Dillon and fellow Chevrolet driver Ross Chastain formed a blockade to allow William Byron to make the Championship 4. In addition, Alexander was suspended for the Phoenix finale. Dillon finished 32nd in the final standings, the lowest points finish of his career.

==== 2025: Return to the Playoffs and Xfinity Series return ====
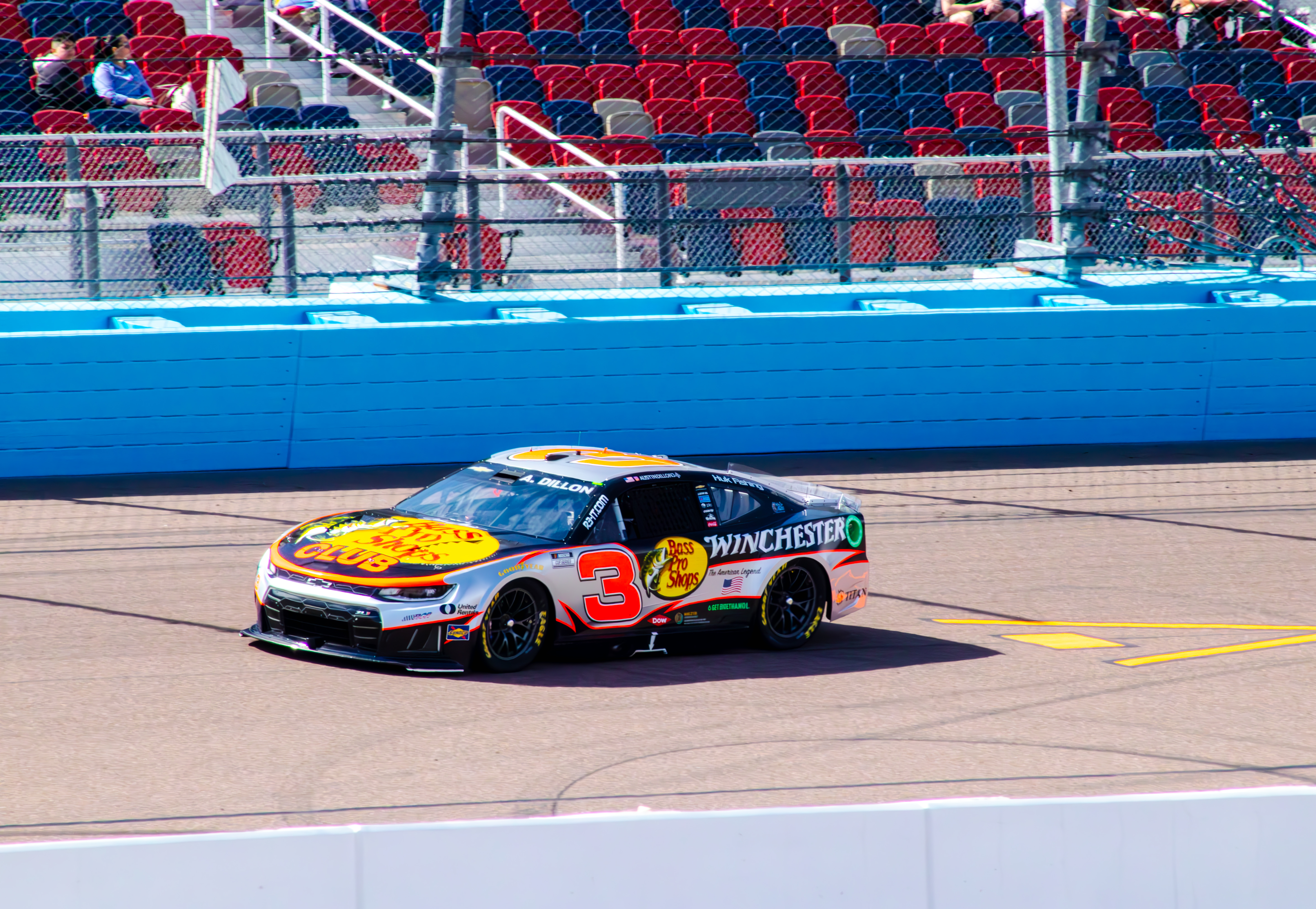
Dillon qualifying for the 2026 Straight Talk Wireless 500 at Phoenix Raceway.

On November 20, 2024, RCR signed Richard Boswell as the crew chief of the No. 3 car, replacing Alexander for the 2025 season. Dillon started the season with a 23rd-place finish at the 2025 Daytona 500. He later scored three consecutive top-ten finishes at Bristol, Talladega, and Texas. After struggling throughout the season, he broke through and won Richmond, this time without controversy, right before the playoffs started.

In the Xfinity Series, Dillon drove the RCR No. 3 car to a thirteenth place finish at Charlotte. He also drove the RCR No. 21 car at Iowa after Austin Hill was suspended for intentionally right-rear hooking Aric Almirola to the outside wall at Indianapolis.

==== 2026 ====
Dillon started the 2026 season with a 37th place finish in the Daytona 500.

=== Other racing ===
In 2021, Dillon joined RWR-Eurasia Motorsport for his 24 Hours of Daytona debut, sharing an LMP2 car with Cody Ware and Salih Yoluç.

== In popular culture ==
In 2019, Dillon made a cameo in the movie Stuber alongside brother Ty and fellow driver Daniel Suárez.

Dillon guest starred in the television series SEAL Team's Season 3, Episode 14 "Objects in Mirror", as a NASCAR driving instructor for the protagonists. Filming took place at Auto Club Speedway in December 2019, while the episode premiered on March 11, 2020.

The Crew, a 2021 NASCAR-centric Netflix series, featured cameo appearances from Dillon and fellow Cup racers Ryan Blaney and Cole Custer.

Dillon and his family are featured in the USA reality series Austin Dillon's Life in the Fast Lane.

A die-cast anthropomorphic race car named Carstin "Ace" Dillon, inspired by Austin, was released in the Disney/Pixar Cars toyline in 2021, alongside die-cast cars based on William Byron and Chase Elliott. An all-plastic version of Carstin was released in 2024 as a pack-in for the Race Lane Change playset.

== Personal life ==
Dillon became engaged to former NFL cheerleader Whitney Ward on August 9, 2016. Austin and Whitney were married December 9, 2017, at Childress Vineyards in Lexington, North Carolina. Their son was born on June 14, 2020. Dillon attended High Point University on a part-time basis and graduated in 2018. He also played in the 2002 Little League World Series in South Williamsport, Pennsylvania. In 2019 Dillion was enshrined into Little League Hall of Excellence.

Dillon co-owns sports management agency Team Dillon Management with his brother Ty which currently manages both themselves as well as fellow NASCAR drivers Anthony Alfredo, Carson Brown, Jeb Burton, Christian Eckes, Austin Hill, Blaine Perkins and Parker Retzlaff.

Since 2022, Dillon has been the general manager of the Carolina Cowboys; one of ten bull riding teams in the Professional Bull Riders (PBR) Team Series, which runs every summer and autumn in the United States. His maternal grandfather Richard Childress is the team's co-owner, along with Jeff Broin. The Carolina Cowboys won the 2025 PBR Team Series Championship title.

== Motorsports career results ==
=== Racing career summary ===
Season	Series	Team	Races	Wins	Top 5	Top 10	Points	Position
2008	NASCAR Camping World East Series	Andy Santerre Motorsports	4	1	2	3	1916	**2nd**
2008	NASCAR Camping World East Series	Richard Childress Racing	9	0	4	7	1916	**2nd**
2008	ARCA Re/Max Series	Richard Childress Racing	1	0	0	1	195	196th
2008	NASCAR Nationwide Series	Richard Childress Racing	2	0	1	1	245	85th
2009	NASCAR Camping World West Series	Richard Childress Racing	1	0	0	0	118	58th
2009	NASCAR Camping World East Series	Richard Childress Racing	2	0	1	2	313	35th
2009	ARCA Re/Max Series	Richard Childress Racing	3	0	2	2	595	50th
2009	NASCAR Camping World Truck Series	Richard Childress Racing	2	0	0	0	127	78th
2009	NASCAR Nationwide Series	Richard Childress Racing	4	0	0	0	355	80th
2010	NASCAR Camping World Truck Series	Richard Childress Racing	25	2	7	16	3379	5th
2010	NASCAR Nationwide Series	Richard Childress Racing	1	0	0	0	88	119th
2011	NASCAR Camping World Truck Series	Richard Childress Racing	25	2	10	16	888	**1st**
2011	NASCAR Nationwide Series	Kevin Harvick Inc.	4	0	1	3	0	NC†
2011	NASCAR Sprint Cup Series	Curb Racing	1	0	0	0	0	NC†
2012	NASCAR Canadian Tire Series	Fitzpatrick Motorsports	1	0	0	1	37	45th
2012	NASCAR Nationwide Series	Richard Childress Racing	33	2	16	27	1227	**3rd**
2012	NASCAR Sprint Cup Series	Richard Childress Racing	1	0	0	0	0	NC†
2013	ARCA Racing Series	Ken Schrader Racing	1	0	0	1	220	93rd
2013	NASCAR Camping World Truck Series	NTS Motorsports	1	0	0	1	0	NC†
2013	NASCAR Camping World Truck Series	Sharp Gallaher Racing	1	0	0	0	0	NC†
2013	NASCAR Camping World Truck Series	Richard Childress Racing	1	1	1	1	0	NC†
2013	NASCAR Nationwide Series	Richard Childress Racing	33	0	13	22	1180	**1st**
2013	NASCAR Sprint Cup Series	Richard Childress Racing	5	0	0	0	0	NC†
2013	NASCAR Sprint Cup Series	Phoenix Racing	4	0	0	0	0	NC†
2013	NASCAR Sprint Cup Series	Stewart-Haas Racing	2	0	0	0	0	NC†
2014	NASCAR K&N Pro Series West	Steve Portenga Racing	1	0	0	0	22	78th
2014	NASCAR K&N Pro Series East	Spraker Racing Enterprises	1	0	0	0	23	62nd
2014	NASCAR Camping World Truck Series	NTS Motorsports	6	0	2	5	0	NC†
2014	NASCAR Camping World Truck Series	Richard Childress Racing	2	1	1	2	0	NC†
2014	NASCAR Nationwide Series	Richard Childress Racing	1	0	0	1	0	NC†
2014	NASCAR Sprint Cup Series	Richard Childress Racing	36	0	1	4	958	20th
2015	NASCAR K&N Pro Series West	Ranier Racing with MDM	1	0	0	1	38	44th
2015	NASCAR Camping World Truck Series	NTS Motorsports	1	0	0	1	0	NC†
2015	NASCAR Camping World Truck Series	GMS Racing	3	1	3	3	0	NC†
2015	NASCAR Xfinity Series	Richard Childress Racing	20	4	13	16	0	NC†
2015	NASCAR Sprint Cup Series	Richard Childress Racing	36	0	1	5	832	21st
2016	NASCAR Camping World Truck Series	Ranier Racing with MDM	1	0	0	1	0	NC†
2016	NASCAR Xfinity Series	Richard Childress Racing	19	2	10	16	0	NC†
2016	NASCAR Sprint Cup Series	Richard Childress Racing	36	0	4	13	2223	14th
2017	NASCAR Camping World Truck Series	MDM Motorsports	1	0	0	1	0	NC†
2017	NASCAR Xfinity Series	Richard Childress Racing	17	0	7	13	0	NC†
2017	Monster Energy NASCAR Cup Series	Richard Childress Racing	36	1	3	4	2224	11th
2018	NASCAR Camping World Truck Series	Young's Motorsports	1	0	0	1	0	NC†
2018	NASCAR Xfinity Series	Kaulig Racing	1	0	0	1	0	NC†
2018	NASCAR Xfinity Series	Richard Childress Racing	6	1	2	3	0	NC†
2018	Monster Energy NASCAR Cup Series	Richard Childress Racing	36	1	2	8	2245	13th
2019	NASCAR K&N Pro Series West	Jefferson Pitts Racing	1	0	1	1	41	38th
2019	NASCAR Gander Outdoors Truck Series	NEMCO Motorsports	1	0	0	0	0	NC†
2019	NASCAR Xfinity Series	Kaulig Racing	4	0	1	2	0	NC†
2019	Monster Energy NASCAR Cup Series	Richard Childress Racing	36	0	0	6	690	21st
2020	NASCAR Cup Series	Richard Childress Racing	35	1	4	9	2277	11th
2021	IMSA SportsCar Championship - LMP2	RWR Eurasia	1	0	1	1	0	NC†
2021	NASCAR Xfinity Series	Bassett Racing	1	0	0	0	0	NC†
2021	NASCAR Xfinity Series	JR Motorsports	1	0	0	0	0	NC†
2021	NASCAR Xfinity Series	Our Motorsports	2	0	0	1	0	NC†
2021	NASCAR Xfinity Series	Jordan Anderson Racing	1	0	0	0	0	NC†
2021	NASCAR Cup Series	Richard Childress Racing	36	0	1	8	935	17th
2022	NASCAR Camping World Truck Series	Young's Motorsports	2	0	0	0	0	NC†
2022	NASCAR Xfinity Series	Big Machine Racing	1	0	0	0	0	NC†
2022	NASCAR Xfinity Series	Brandonbilt Motorsports	1	0	0	0	0	NC†
2022	NASCAR Cup Series	Richard Childress Racing	36	1	5	11	2228	11th
2023	SRX Series	N/A	1	0	0	0	0	NC†
2023	NASCAR Xfinity Series	Kaulig Racing	2	0	0	1	0	NC†
2023	NASCAR Cup Series	Richard Childress Racing	36	0	1	7	545	29th
2024	NASCAR Cup Series	Richard Childress Racing	36	1	1	5	493	32nd
2025	NASCAR Xfinity Series	Richard Childress Racing	2	0	0	0	0	NC†
2025	NASCAR Cup Series	Richard Childress Racing	36	1	1	5	2152	15th
2026	NASCAR O'Reilly Auto Parts Series	Richard Childress Racing	1	0	0	0	0*	NC†*
2026	NASCAR Cup Series	Richard Childress Racing	28	0	0	5	474*	24th*

^{†} As Dillon was a guest driver, he was ineligible for championship points.

=== NASCAR ===
(key) (Bold – Pole position awarded by qualifying time. Italics – Pole position earned by points standings or practice time. * – Most laps led.)

==== Cup Series ====
NASCAR Cup Series results
Year	Team	No.	Make	1	2	3	4	5	6	7	8	9	10	11	12	13	14	15	16	17	18	19	20	21	22	23	24	25	26	27	28	29	30	31	32	33	34	35	36	NCSC	Pts	Ref
2011	Curb Racing	98	Chevy	DAY	PHO	LVS	BRI	CAL	MAR	TEX	TAL	RCH	DAR	DOV	CLT	KAN	POC	MCH	SON	DAY	KEN	NHA	IND	POC	GLN	MCH	BRI	ATL	RCH	CHI	NHA	DOV	KAN; 26	CLT	TAL	MAR	TEX	PHO	HOM	62nd	0^{1}	
2012	Richard Childress Racing	33	Chevy	DAY	PHO	LVS	BRI	CAL	MAR	TEX	KAN	RCH	TAL	DAR	CLT	DOV	POC	MCH; 24	SON	KEN	DAY	NHA	IND	POC	GLN	MCH	BRI	ATL	RCH	CHI	NHA	DOV	TAL	CLT	KAN	MAR	TEX	PHO	HOM	65th	0^{1}	
2013	Richard Childress Racing	33	Chevy	DAY; 31	PHO													MCH; 11	SON				IND; 26	POC	GLN			ATL; 19	RCH	CHI	NHA	DOV	KAN	CLT			TEX; 22	PHO	HOM	54th	0^{1}	
2013	Phoenix Racing	51	Chevy			LVS; 21	BRI	CAL	MAR	TEX; 33	KAN	RCH	TAL	DAR	CLT	DOV; 27	POC			KEN; 24	DAY	NHA																		54th	0^{1}	
2013	Stewart–Haas Racing	14	Chevy																							MCH; 14	BRI								TAL; 26	MAR				54th	0^{1}	
2014	Richard Childress Racing	3	Chevy	**DAY**; 9	PHO; 24	LVS; 16	BRI; 11	CAL; 11	MAR; 15	TEX; 21	DAR; 11	RCH; 27	TAL; 15	KAN; 19	CLT; 16	DOV; 20	POC; 17	MCH; 30	SON; 17	KEN; 16	DAY; 5	NHA; 14	IND; 10	POC; 15	GLN; 16	MCH; 22	BRI; 28	ATL; 24	RCH; 20	CHI; 16	NHA; 11	DOV; 24	KAN; 8	CLT; 13	TAL; 12	MAR; 12	TEX; 21	PHO; 38	HOM; 25	20th	958	
2015	Richard Childress Racing	3	Chevy	DAY; 14	ATL; 39	LVS; 20	PHO; 15	CAL; 16	MAR; 41	TEX; 20	BRI; 10	RCH; 27	TAL; 35	KAN; 22	CLT; 16	DOV; 33	POC; 19	MCH; 20	SON; 17	DAY; 7	KEN; 25	NHA; 8	IND; 25	POC; 13	GLN; 36	MCH; 4	BRI; 13	DAR; 22	RCH; 27	CHI; 43	NHA; 22	DOV; 23	CLT; 7	KAN; 41	TAL; 14	MAR; 18	TEX; 11	PHO; 20	HOM; 14	21st	832	
2016	Richard Childress Racing	3	Chevy	DAY; 9	ATL; 11	LVS; 5	PHO; 9	**CAL**; 24	MAR; 4	TEX; 19	BRI; 26	RCH; 20	TAL; 3	KAN; 6	DOV; 33	CLT; 12	POC; 37	MCH; 8	SON; 22	DAY; 7	KEN; 16	NHA; 13	IND; 9	POC; 13	GLN; 31	BRI; 4	MCH; 16	DAR; 12	RCH; 13	CHI; 14	NHA; 16	DOV; 8	CLT; 32	KAN; 6	TAL; 9	MAR; 17	**TEX**; 37	PHO; 39	HOM; 12	14th	2223	
2017	Richard Childress Racing	3	Chevy	DAY; 19	ATL; 32	LVS; 25	PHO; 18	CAL; 11	MAR; 5	TEX; 33	BRI; 13	RCH; 20	TAL; 36	KAN; 16	CLT; 1	DOV; 13	POC; 13	MCH; 27	SON; 18	DAY; 36	KEN; 19	NHA; 15	IND; 21	POC; 21	GLN; 26	MCH; 7	BRI; 39	DAR; 4	RCH; 21	CHI; 16	NHA; 19	DOV; 16	CLT; 16	TAL; 29	KAN; 14	MAR; 13	TEX; 13	PHO; 14	HOM; 11	11th	2224	
2018	Richard Childress Racing	3	Chevy	DAY; 1	ATL; 14	LVS; 13	PHO; 17	CAL; 10	MAR; 30	TEX; 26	BRI; 15	RCH; 15	TAL; 35	DOV; 26	KAN; 17	CLT; 34	POC; 12	MCH; 14	SON; 16	CHI; 37	DAY; 9	KEN; 22	NHA; 21	POC; 13	GLN; 27	MCH; 4	BRI; 13	DAR; 16	IND; 22	LVS; 11	RCH; 6	ROV; 39	DOV; 7	TAL; 17	KAN; 11	MAR; 30	TEX; 10	PHO; 8	HOM; 11	13th	2245	
2019	Richard Childress Racing	3	Chevy	DAY; 16	ATL; 21	LVS; 20	PHO; 21	**CAL**; 10	MAR; 11	TEX; 14	BRI; 14	RCH; 6	**TAL**; 14	DOV; 19	KAN; 17	CLT; 34	POC; 37	MCH; 26	SON; 24	**CHI**; 10	DAY; 33*	KEN; 35	NHA; 32	POC; 19	GLN; 31	MCH; 13	BRI; 34	DAR; 10	IND; 12	LVS; 12	RCH; 22	ROV; 23	DOV; 18	TAL; 6	KAN; 20	MAR; 22	TEX; 13	PHO; 24	HOM; 8	21st	690	
2020	Richard Childress Racing	3	Chevy	DAY; 12	LVS; 4	CAL; 24	PHO; 36	DAR; 11	DAR; 20	CLT; 14	CLT; 8	BRI; 6	ATL; 11	MAR; 37	HOM; 7	TAL; 39	POC; 19	POC; 14	IND; 18	KEN; 13	TEX; 1	KAN; 27	NHA; 13	MCH; 31	MCH; 8	DRC	DOV; 15	DOV; 9	DAY; 25	DAR; 2	RCH; 4	BRI; 12	LVS; 32	TAL; 12	ROV; 19	KAN; 11	TEX; 11	MAR; 23	PHO; 18	11th	2277	
2021	Richard Childress Racing	3	Chevy	DAY; 3	DRC; 34	HOM; 12	LVS; 12	PHO; 17	ATL; 6	BRD; 21	MAR; 14	RCH; 10	TAL; 8	KAN; 10	DAR; 16	DOV; 14	COA; 12	CLT; 6	SON; 13	NSH; 12	POC; 21	POC; 13	ROA; 11	ATL; 12	NHA; 17	GLN; 15	IRC; 31	MCH; 36	DAY; 17	DAR; 10	RCH; 11	BRI; 15	LVS; 13	TAL; 11	ROV; 15	TEX; 14	KAN; 10	MAR; 13	PHO; 15	17th	935	
2022	Richard Childress Racing	3	Chevy	DAY; 25	CAL; 2	LVS; 11	PHO; 21	ATL; 35	COA; 10	RCH; 10	MAR; 3	BRD; 31	TAL; 2	DOV; 23	DAR; 9	KAN; 13	CLT; 22	GTW; 15	SON; 11	NSH; 14	ROA; 31	ATL; 35	NHA; 23	POC; 10	IRC; 30	MCH; 13	RCH; 16	GLN; 17	DAY; 1	DAR; 17	KAN; 14	BRI; 31	TEX; 17	TAL; 13	ROV; 10	LVS; 10	HOM; 4	MAR; 33	PHO; 13	11th	2228	
2023	Richard Childress Racing	3	Chevy	DAY; 33	CAL; 9	LVS; 27	PHO; 16	ATL; 20	COA; 33	RCH; 25	BRD; 3	MAR; 12	TAL; 38	DOV; 27	KAN; 10	DAR; 35	CLT; 9	GTW; 31	SON; 19	NSH; 13	CSC; 36	ATL; 21	NHA; 9	POC; 34	RCH; 9	MCH; 19	IRC; 16	GLN; 31	DAY; 33	DAR; 20	KAN; 33	BRI; 17	TEX; 36	TAL; 33	ROV; 14	LVS; 18	HOM; 10	MAR; 23	PHO; 12	29th	545	
2024	Richard Childress Racing	3	Chevy	DAY; 37	ATL; 22	LVS; 16	PHO; 32	BRI; 24	COA; 25	RCH; 24	MAR; 34	TEX; 8	TAL; 30	DOV; 27	KAN; 25	DAR; 28	CLT; 27	GTW; 6	SON; 36	IOW; 19	NHA; 33	NSH; 32	CSC; 19	POC; 23	IND; 13	RCH; 1	MCH; 17	DAY; 22	DAR; 15	ATL; 20	GLN; 28	BRI; 21	KAN; 12	TAL; 8	ROV; 32	LVS; 37	HOM; 25	MAR; 7	PHO; 27	32nd	493	
2025	Richard Childress Racing	3	Chevy	DAY; 23	ATL; 16	COA; 35	PHO; 12	LVS; 32	HOM; 13	MAR; 18	DAR; 23	BRI; 10	TAL; 10	TEX; 7	KAN; 22	CLT; 20	NSH; 29	MCH; 19	MXC; 28	POC; 24	ATL; 20	CSC; 36	SON; 21	DOV; 15	IND; 38	IOW; 10	GLN; 15	RCH; 1	DAY; 24	DAR; 23	GTW; 18	BRI; 28	NHA; 13	KAN; 27	ROV; 31	LVS; 25	TAL; 27	MAR; 16	PHO; 20	15th	2152	
2026	Richard Childress Racing	3	Chevy	DAY; 37	ATL; 29	COA; 19	PHO; 16	LVS; 12	DAR; 25	MAR; 25	BRI; 18	KAN; 16	TAL; 19	TEX; 18	GLN; 6	CLT; 32	NSH; 18	MCH; 36	POC; 25	COR; 24	SON; 27	CHI; 24	ATL; 7	NWS; 23	IND; 29	IOW; 10	RCH; 19	NHA; 32	DAY; 7	DAR; 29	GTW; 6	BRI; 17	KAN; 21	LVS; 19	CLT; 26	PHO; 37	TAL; 11	MAR; 7	HOM; 26	24th	607	

===== Daytona 500 =====
Year	Team	Manufacturer	Start	Finish
2013	Richard Childress Racing	Chevrolet	8	31
2014	Richard Childress Racing	Chevrolet	**1**	9
2015	Richard Childress Racing	Chevrolet	30	14
2016	Richard Childress Racing	Chevrolet	21	9
2017	Richard Childress Racing	Chevrolet	10	19
2018	Richard Childress Racing	Chevrolet	14	**1**
2019	Richard Childress Racing	Chevrolet	20	16
2020	Richard Childress Racing	Chevrolet	13	12
2021	Richard Childress Racing	Chevrolet	4	3
2022	Richard Childress Racing	Chevrolet	36	25
2023	Richard Childress Racing	Chevrolet	27	33
2024	Richard Childress Racing	Chevrolet	33	37
2025	Richard Childress Racing	Chevrolet	15	23
2026	Richard Childress Racing	Chevrolet	7	37

==== O'Reilly Auto Parts Series ====
NASCAR O'Reilly Auto Parts Series results
Year	Team	No.	Make	1	2	3	4	5	6	7	8	9	10	11	12	13	14	15	16	17	18	19	20	21	22	23	24	25	26	27	28	29	30	31	32	33	34	35	NOAPSC	Pts	Ref
2008	Richard Childress Racing	21	Chevy	DAY	CAL	LVS	ATL	BRI	NSH	TEX	PHO	MXC	TAL	RCH	DAR	CLT	DOV	NSH	KEN	MLW	NHA	DAY	CHI	GTY	IRP	CGV	GLN	MCH	BRI	CAL	RCH; 26	DOV	KAN	CLT	MEM; 4	TEX	PHO	HOM	85th	245	
2009	Richard Childress Racing	2	Chevy	DAY	CAL	LVS	BRI	TEX	NSH	PHO; 34	TAL	RCH	DAR	CLT	DOV	NSH	KEN	MLW	NHA	DAY	CHI	GTY	IRP; 18	IOW; 28	GLN	MCH; 19	BRI	CGV	ATL	RCH	DOV	KAN	CAL	CLT	MEM	TEX	PHO	HOM	80th	355	
2010	Richard Childress Racing	21	Chevy	DAY	CAL	LVS	BRI	NSH	PHO	TEX	TAL	RCH	DAR	DOV	CLT	NSH	KEN	ROA	NHA; 25	DAY	CHI	GTY	IRP	IOW	GLN	MCH	BRI	CGV	ATL	RCH	DOV	KAN	CAL	CLT	GTY	TEX	PHO	HOM	119th	88	
2011	Kevin Harvick Inc.	33	Chevy	DAY	PHO	LVS	BRI	CAL	TEX	TAL	NSH; 7	RCH	DAR	DOV	IOW; 10	CLT	CHI	MCH	ROA	DAY	KEN	NHA	NSH; 3	IRP; 14	IOW	GLN	CGV	BRI	ATL	RCH	CHI	DOV	KAN	CLT	TEX	PHO	HOM		107th^{1}	0^{1}	
2012	Richard Childress Racing	3	Chevy	DAY; 5	PHO; 4	LVS; 7	BRI; 12	CAL; 5	TEX; 5	RCH; 9	TAL; 17	DAR; 5	IOW; 4	CLT; 11	DOV; 6	**MCH**; 5	ROA; 18	**KEN**; 1*	DAY; 4	NHA; 3	CHI; 6	IND; 5	IOW; 15	GLN; 23	CGV; 9	BRI; 4	ATL; 6	RCH; 6	CHI; 3	**KEN**; 1	DOV; 10	CLT; 6	KAN; 2	TEX; 6	PHO; 6	HOM; 5			3rd	1227	
2013	Richard Childress Racing	3	Chevy	DAY; 21	PHO; 6	LVS; 6	BRI; 11	CAL; 5	TEX; 3	RCH; 35	TAL; 10	DAR; 11	**CLT**; 14	**DOV**; 8	**IOW**; 2	**MCH**; 20	ROA; 10	**KEN**; 6	**DAY**; 5	NHA; 3	CHI; 3	IND; 12	IOW; 4	GLN; 12	MOH; 21	BRI; 3	ATL; 8	RCH; 12	CHI; 4	KEN; 2	DOV; 6	**KAN**; 6	CLT; 2	TEX; 5	PHO; 3	HOM; 12			1st	1180	
2014	Richard Childress Racing	33	Chevy	DAY	PHO	LVS	BRI	CAL	TEX	DAR	RCH	TAL	IOW	CLT	DOV	MCH	ROA	KEN	DAY	NHA	CHI	IND	IOW	GLN	MOH	BRI	ATL	RCH	CHI	KEN	DOV	KAN	CLT	TEX; 7	PHO	HOM			94th	0^{1}	
2015	Richard Childress Racing	33	Chevy	**DAY**; 4	ATL	**LVS**; 1*	PHO; 4	CAL; 38	TEX; 5	BRI; 16	RCH; 8	**TAL**; 3	IOW	**CLT**; 1*	DOV; 4	MCH	**CHI**; 3	DAY; 1	KEN	NHA; 2	IND	IOW	GLN	MOH	BRI	ROA	DAR	RCH; 9	CHI	KEN	DOV; 7	**CLT**; 1	KAN; 16	TEX; 3	PHO; 14	HOM; 2			81st	0^{1}	
2016	Richard Childress Racing	2	Chevy	DAY; 5	ATL	LVS; 6	PHO; 7	CAL; 1	TEX; 8	BRI; 4	RCH; 5	TAL; 6	DOV	CLT; 2	POC	MCH	IOW	DAY; 28	KEN; 2	NHA; 5	IND	IOW	GLN	MOH	BRI; 1	ROA	DAR	**RCH**; 7	CHI	KEN	DOV; QL^{†}	CLT; 14	KAN; 17	TEX; 7	PHO; 2	HOM; 5			86th	0^{1}	
2017	Richard Childress Racing	2	Chevy	DAY; 3	ATL; 8	LVS; 5	PHO; 33	CAL	TEX; 4	BRI; 13	RCH; 4	TAL	CLT; 3	DOV; 28	POC	MCH	IOW	DAY	KEN	NHA	IND	IOW	GLN	MOH	BRI; 8	ROA	DAR; 10	RCH	CHI; 5	KEN	DOV; 23	CLT; 4	KAN; 6	TEX; 10	PHO; 9	HOM			98th	0^{1}	
2018	Richard Childress Racing	3	Chevy	DAY; 32	ATL	LVS; 12	PHO	CAL; 4	TEX	BRI	RCH	TAL	DOV	CLT	POC	MCH; 1	IOW	CHI	DAY	KEN	NHA; 10	IOW	GLN; 25	MOH	BRI	ROA	DAR												88th	0^{1}	
2018	Kaulig Racing	10	Chevy																									IND; 8	LVS	RCH	ROV	DOV	KAN	TEX	PHO	HOM			88th	0^{1}	
2019	Kaulig Racing	10	Chevy	DAY	ATL	LVS; 4	PHO	CAL	TEX	BRI	RCH	TAL	DOV	CLT; 28	POC; 10	MCH	IOW	CHI	DAY	KEN	NHA	IOW	GLN	MOH	BRI	ROA	DAR	IND; 34	LVS	RCH	ROV	DOV	KAN	TEX	PHO	HOM			87th	0^{1}	
2021	Bassett Racing	77	Chevy	DAY	DRC	HOM	LVS	PHO	ATL	MAR	TAL	DAR	DOV	COA; 13	CLT	MOH	TEX	NSH	POC	ROA																			82nd	0^{1}	
2021	JR Motorsports	1	Chevy																		ATL; 11	NHA																	82nd	0^{1}	
2021	Our Motorsports	23	Chevy																				GLN; 37	IRC; 6	MCH	DAY													82nd	0^{1}	
2021	Jordan Anderson Racing	31	Chevy																								DAR; 29	RCH	BRI	LVS	TAL	ROV	TEX	KAN	MAR	PHO			82nd	0^{1}	
2022	Big Machine Racing	48	Chevy	DAY	CAL	LVS	PHO	ATL	COA	RCH	MAR	TAL	DOV	DAR	TEX	CLT; 31	PIR	NSH	ROA	ATL	NHA	POC																	103rd	0^{1}	
2022	Brandonbilt Motorsports	68	Chevy																				IRC; 26	MCH	GLN	DAY	DAR	KAN	BRI	TEX	TAL	ROV	LVS	HOM	MAR	PHO			103rd	0^{1}	
2023	Kaulig Racing	10	Chevy	DAY	CAL; 8	LVS	PHO	ATL	COA	RCH	MAR	TAL	DOV	DAR	CLT	PIR	SON	NSH	CSC	ATL	NHA; 16	POC	ROA	MCH	IRC	GLN	DAY	DAR	KAN	BRI	TEX	ROV	LVS	HOM	MAR	PHO			86th	0^{1}	
2025	Richard Childress Racing	3	Chevy	DAY	ATL	COA	PHO	LVS	HOM	MAR	DAR	BRI	CAR	TAL	TEX	CLT; 13	NSH	MXC	POC	ATL	CSC	SON	DOV	IND															89th	0^{1}	
2025	Richard Childress Racing	21	Chevy																						IOW; 14	GLN	DAY	PIR	GTW	BRI	KAN	ROV	LVS	TAL	MAR	PHO			89th	0^{1}	
2026	Richard Childress Racing	3	Chevy	DAY	ATL	COA	PHO	LVS	DAR	MAR	CAR	BRI	KAN	TAL	TEX; 23	GLN	DOV	CLT	NSS	POC	COR	SON	CHI	ATL	IND	IOW	DAY	DAR	GTW	BRI	LVS	CLT	PHO	TAL	MAR	HOM			88th	0^{1}	
^{†} – Qualified but replaced by Regan Smith

==== Craftsman Truck Series ====
NASCAR Craftsman Truck Series results
Year	Team	No.	Make	1	2	3	4	5	6	7	8	9	10	11	12	13	14	15	16	17	18	19	20	21	22	23	24	25	NCWTC	Pts	Ref
2009	Richard Childress Racing	3	Chevy	DAY	CAL	ATL	MAR	KAN	CLT	DOV	TEX	MCH	MLW	MEM	KEN	IRP	NSH	BRI	CHI	IOW; 12	GTW	NHA; 15	LVS	MAR	TAL; DNQ	TEX	PHO	HOM	78th	127	
2010	Richard Childress Racing	3	Chevy	DAY; 26	ATL; 10	MAR; 16	NSH; 14	KAN; 6	DOV; 21	CLT; 35	**TEX**; 3	**MCH**; 5	**IOW**; 1*	GTW; 7	IRP; 6	POC; 7	NSH; 2	DAR; 5	BRI; 17	CHI; 9	**KEN**; 9	NHA; 5	**LVS**; 1*	MAR; 16	TAL; 8	TEX; 25	**PHO**; 7	**HOM**; 31	5th	3379	
2011	Richard Childress Racing	3	Chevy	**DAY**; 20	PHO; 5	DAR; 15	MAR; 7	NSH; 11	DOV; 4	CLT; 7	**KAN**; 12	TEX; 26	KEN; 14	IOW; 2*	**NSH**; 1	**IRP**; 9	POC; 5	MCH; 22	BRI; 23	ATL; 6	CHI; 1	NHA; 2	**KEN**; 2	LVS; 17	TAL; 7	MAR; 3	TEX; 2	HOM; 10	1st	888	
2013	Richard Childress Racing	39	Chevy	DAY	MAR	CAR	KAN	CLT	DOV	TEX	KEN	IOW	ELD; 1	POC	MCH	BRI	MSP	IOW											86th	0^{1}	
2013	NTS Motorsports	24	Chevy																CHI; 7	LVS	TAL	MAR	TEX	PHO					86th	0^{1}	
2013	Sharp Gallaher Racing	6	Chevy																						HOM; 20				86th	0^{1}	
2014	NTS Motorsports	20	Chevy	DAY	MAR	KAN; 4	CLT; 7	DOV	TEX	GTW	KEN; 7	IOW			MCH; 17	BRI	MSP	CHI; 3	NHA	LVS	TAL	MAR	TEX						89th	0^{1}	
2014	Richard Childress Racing	2	Chevy										ELD; 10																89th	0^{1}	
2014	Richard Childress Racing	3	Chevy											POC; 1*															89th	0^{1}	
2014	NTS Motorsports	14	Chevy																					PHO; 8	HOM				89th	0^{1}	
2015	NTS Motorsports	31	Chevy	DAY	ATL	MAR	KAN	CLT	DOV	TEX	GTW	IOW	KEN	ELD; 6															82nd	0^{1}	
2015	GMS Racing	33	Chevy												POC; 5	MCH; 5	BRI	MSP	CHI	**NHA**; 1*	LVS	TAL	MAR	TEX	PHO	HOM			82nd	0^{1}	
2016	Ranier Racing with MDM	71	Chevy	DAY	ATL	MAR	KAN	DOV	CLT	TEX	IOW	GTW	KEN	ELD	POC	BRI	MCH	MSP	CHI	NHA	LVS	TAL	MAR	TEX; 8	PHO	HOM			87th	0^{1}	
2017	MDM Motorsports	99	Chevy	DAY	ATL; 7	MAR	KAN	CLT	DOV	TEX	GTW	IOW	KEN	ELD	POC	MCH	BRI	MSP	CHI	NHA	LVS	TAL	MAR	TEX	PHO	HOM			82nd	0^{1}	
2018	Young's Motorsports	20	Chevy	DAY	ATL; 10	LVS	MAR	DOV	KAN	CLT	TEX	IOW	GTW	CHI	KEN	ELD	POC	MCH	BRI	MSP	LVS	TAL	MAR	TEX	PHO	HOM			98th	0^{1}	
2019	NEMCO Motorsports	8	Chevy	DAY	ATL	LVS	MAR; 13	TEX	DOV	KAN	CLT	TEX	IOW	GTW	CHI	KEN	POC	ELD	MCH	BRI	MSP	LVS	TAL	MAR	PHO	HOM			103rd	0^{1}	
2022	Young's Motorsports	20	Chevy	DAY	LVS	ATL	COA	MAR	BRD; 14	DAR	KAN	TEX	CLT	GTW	SON; 17	KNX	NSH	MOH	POC	IRP	RCH	KAN	BRI	TAL	HOM	PHO			95th	0^{1}	

^{*} Season still in progress
^{1} Ineligible for series points

==== Canadian Tire Series ====
NASCAR Canadian Tire Series results
Year	Team	No.	Make	1	2	3	4	5	6	7	8	9	10	11	12	NCTSC	Pts	Ref
2012	Fitzpatrick Motorsports	4	Chevy	MSP	ICAR	MSP	DEL	MPS	EDM	SAS	CTR	CGV; 7	BAR	RIS	KWA	45th	37	

=== ARCA Menards Series ===
(key) (Bold – Pole position awarded by qualifying time. Italics – Pole position earned by points standings or practice time. * – Most laps led.)

ARCA Menards Series results
Year	Team	No.	Make	1	2	3	4	5	6	7	8	9	10	11	12	13	14	15	16	17	18	19	20	21	ARSC	Pts	Ref
2008	Richard Childress Racing	31	Chevy	DAY	SLM	IOW	KEN	CAR	KEN; 7	TOL	POC	MCH	CAY	KEN	BLN	POC	NSH	ISF	DSF	CHI	SLM	NJE	TAL	TOL	96th	195	
2009	Richard Childress Racing	31	Chevy	DAY	SLM	CAR	TAL	KEN; 15	TOL	POC	MCH; 2	MFD	IOW; 2	KEN	BLN	POC	ISF	CHI	TOL	DSF	NJE	SLM	KAN	CAR	50th	595	
2013	Ken Schrader Racing	52	Chevy	DAY	MOB	SLM	TAL	TOL	ELK	POC	MCH	ROA; 6	WIN	CHI	NJE	POC	BLN	ISF	MAD	DSF	IOW	SLM	KEN	KAN	93rd	220	

==== K&N Pro Series East ====
NASCAR K&N Pro Series East results
Year	Team	No.	Make	1	2	3	4	5	6	7	8	9	10	11	12	13	14	15	16	NKNPSEC	Pts	Ref
2008	Andy Santerre Motorsports	3	Chevy	GRE; 1*	**IOW**; 6	SBO; 2	GLN; 12													2nd	1916	
2008	Richard Childress Racing	3	Chevy					**NHA**; 4	TMP; 9	NSH; 3	ADI; 25	LRP; 21	MFD; 6	NHA; 5	DOV; 9	STA; 4				2nd	1916	
2009	Richard Childress Racing	3	Chevy	GRE	TRI; 2	IOW; 9	SBO	GLN	NHA	TMP	ADI	LRP	NHA	DOV						35th	313	
2014	Spraker Racing Enterprises	37	Chevy	NSM	DAY	BRI	GRE	RCH	IOW	BGS	FIF	LGY	NHA	COL	IOW	GLN; 21	VIR	GRE	DOV	62nd	23	

==== K&N Pro Series West ====
NASCAR K&N Pro Series West results
Year	Team	No.	Make	1	2	3	4	5	6	7	8	9	10	11	12	13	14	NKNPSWC	Pts	Ref
2009	Richard Childress Racing with Jim Offenbach	31	Chevy	CTS	AAS	PHO; 15	MAD	IOW	DCS	SON	IRW	PIR	MMP	CNS	IOW	AAS		58th	118	
2014	Steve Portenga Racing	21	Chevy	PHO	IRW	S99	IOW	KCR	SON; 22	SLS	CNS	IOW	EVG	KCR	MMP	AAS	PHO	78th	22	
2015	Ranier Racing with MDM	40	Chevy	KCR	IRW	TUS	IOW	SHA	SON; 6	SLS	IOW	EVG	CNS	MER	AAS	PHO		44th	38	
2019	Jefferson Pitts Racing	3	Chevy	LVS	IRW	TUS	TUS	CNS	SON; 3	DCS	IOW	EVG	GTW	MER	AAS	KCR	PHO	38th	41	

=== Superstar Racing Experience ===
(key) * – Most laps led. ^{1} – Heat 1 winner. ^{2} – Heat 2 winner.

Superstar Racing Experience results
Year	No.	1	2	3	4	5	6	SRXC	Pts	Ref
2023	33	STA	STA II	MMS	BER	ELD; 11	IRP	24th	0^{1}	

=== Complete WeatherTech SportsCar Championship results ===
(key) (Races in bold indicate pole position; races in italics indicate fastest lap)

Year	Entrant	Class	Make	Engine	1	2	3	4	5	6	7	Rank	Points	Ref
2021	RWR Eurasia	LMP2	Ligier JS P217	Gibson GK428 4.2 L V8	DAY; 4†	SEB	WGL	WGL	ELK	LGA	PET	NC†	0†	

^{†} Points only counted towards the Michelin Endurance Cup, and not the overall LMP2 Championship.

=== 24 Hours of Daytona results ===
Year	Team	Co-drivers	Car	Class	Laps	Pos.	Class Pos.	Ref
2021	(United States) RWR Eurasia	(Germany) Sven Müller (United States) Cody Ware (Turkey) Salih Yoluç	Ligier JS P217	LMP2	778	10th	4th	

== See also ==
- List of Daytona 500 pole position winners
- List of Daytona 500 winners
- List of NASCAR Truck Series champions
- List of NASCAR Nationwide Series champions
- List of people from North Carolina

Sporting positions
Preceded by Ricky Stenhouse Jr.	NASCAR Nationwide Series Champion; 2013	Succeeded by Chase Elliott
Preceded by Todd Bodine	NASCAR Camping World Truck Series Champion; 2011	Succeeded by James Buescher
Achievements
Preceded by Timmy Hill	NASCAR Nationwide Series Rookie of the Year; 2012	Succeeded by Kyle Larson
Preceded by Johnny Sauter	NASCAR Camping World Truck Series Rookie of the Year; 2010	Succeeded by Joey Coulter
Preceded by Martin Truex Jr.	Coca-Cola 600 winner 2017	Succeeded by Kyle Busch
Preceded by Kurt Busch	Daytona 500 winner 2018	Succeeded by Denny Hamlin
Awards
Preceded by Narain Karthikeyan	NASCAR Camping World Truck Series Most Popular Driver; 2011	Succeeded by Nelson Piquet Jr.
