= 2015 O'Reilly Auto Parts 300 =

6th race in the 2015 NASCAR Xfinity Series

Race details
- Race 6 of 33 of the 2015 NASCAR Xfinity Series
- Date: April 10, 2015
- Location: Texas Motor Speedway, Fort Worth, Texas
- Course: Permanent racing facility
- Course length: 1.5 miles (2.4 km)
- Distance: 200 laps, 300 mi (482.803 km)
- Average speed: 132.989 miles per hour (214.025 km/h)

Pole position
Driver	Erik Jones	Joe Gibbs Racing
- Time: 29.163

Most laps led
Driver	Erik Jones	Joe Gibbs Racing
- Laps: 79

Winner
No. 20	Erik Jones	Joe Gibbs Racing

Television in the United States
- Network: FS1
- Announcers: Adam Alexander, Jeff Gordon, and Michael Waltrip

Radio in the United States
- Radio: PRN

The 2015 O'Reilly Auto Parts 300 was the 6th race of the 2015 NASCAR Xfinity Series season and 11th iteration of the event. The race was held at Texas Motor Speedway a 1.5 mi (2.4 km) quad-oval intermediate speedway in Fort Worth, Texas on Friday, April 10, 2015. Erik Jones led 79 laps and won his first Xfinity Series race. Rounding out the top 3 are Brad Keselowski, who finished 2nd, and Dale Earnhardt Jr., who finished 3rd.

== Background ==
The layout of Texas Motor Speedway, the venue where the race was held.

Texas Motor Speedway is a 1.5 mi (2.4 km) quad-oval intermediate speedway in Fort Worth, Texas. The track is owned by the city of Fort Worth's sports authority and is leased out by Speedway Motorsports (SMI) for racing. The Xfinity Series began racing here in 1997 and twice a year in 2005.

=== Entry list ===
- (R) denotes a rookie driver
- (I) Ineligible for points

No	Driver	Team	Manufacturer
0	Harrison Rhodes (R)	JD Motorsports	Chevrolet
01	Landon Cassill	JD Motorsports	Chevrolet
1	Elliott Sadler	Roush Fenway Racing	Ford
2	Brian Scott	Richard Childress Racing	Chevrolet
3	Ty Dillon	Richard Childress Racing	Chevrolet
4	Ross Chastain (R)	JD Motorsports	Chevrolet
6	Bubba Wallace (R)	Roush Fenway Racing	Ford
7	Regan Smith	JR Motorsports	Chevrolet
8	Blake Koch	TriStar Motorsports	Toyota
9	Chase Elliott	JR Motorsports	Chevrolet
10	Jeff Green	TriStar Motorsports	Toyota
13	Timmy Hill (I)	MBM Motorsports	Dodge
14	Cale Conley (R)	TriStar Motorsports	Toyota
15	Stanton Barrett	Rick Ware Racing	Ford
16	Ryan Reed	Roush Fenway Racing	Ford
18	Daniel Suárez (R)	Joe Gibbs Racing	Toyota
19	Mike Bliss	TriStar Motorsports	Toyota
20	Erik Jones (I)	Joe Gibbs Racing	Toyota
22	Brad Keselowski (I)	Team Penske	Ford
24	Eric McClure	JGL Racing	Toyota
25	John Wes Townley (I)	Athenian Motorsports	Chevrolet
28	J. J. Yeley	JGL Racing	Toyota
33	Austin Dillon (I)	Richard Childress Racing	Chevrolet
39	Ryan Sieg	RSS Racing	Chevrolet
40	Derek White	MBM Motorsports	Dodge
42	Brennan Poole	HScott Motorsports	Chevrolet
43	Dakoda Armstrong	Richard Petty Motorsports	Ford
44	David Starr	TriStar Motorsports	Toyota
51	Jeremy Clements	Jeremy Clements Racing	Chevrolet
52	Joey Gase	Jimmy Means Racing	Chevrolet
54	Denny Hamlin (I)	Joe Gibbs Racing	Toyota
55	Brandon Gdovic	Viva Motorsports	Chevrolet
60	Chris Buescher	Roush Fenway Racing	Ford
62	Brendan Gaughan	Richard Childress Racing	Chevrolet
70	Derrike Cope	Derrike Cope Racing	Chevrolet
74	Mike Harmon	Mike Harmon Racing	Dodge
88	Dale Earnhardt Jr. (I)	JR Motorsports	Chevrolet
90	Mario Gosselin	King Autosport	Chevrolet
97	Peyton Sellers	Obaika Racing	Chevrolet
98	Sam Hornish Jr. (I)	Biagi–DenBeste Racing	Ford
Entry list

== Qualifying ==
Qualifying was held on Friday, April 10th at 3:45 P.M. CT. Erik Jones won the pole with a time of 29.163 and a speed of 185.166 mph (297.996 km/h).

Grid	No	Driver	Team	Manufacturer	Time	Speed
1	20	Erik Jones	Joe Gibbs Racing	Toyota	29.163	185.166
2	22	Brad Keselowski	Team Penske	Ford	29.211	184.862
3	33	Austin Dillon	Richard Childress Racing	Chevrolet	29.273	184.470
4	18	Daniel Suárez	Joe Gibbs Racing	Toyota	29.274	184.464
5	88	Dale Earnhardt Jr.	JR Motorsports	Chevrolet	29.320	184.175
6	7	Regan Smith	JR Motorsports	Chevrolet	29.347	184.005
7	2	Brian Scott	Richard Childress Racing	Chevrolet	29.382	183.786
8	6	Bubba Wallace	Roush Fenway Racing	Ford	29.419	183.555
9	9	Chase Elliott	JR Motorsports	Chevrolet	29.439	183.430
10	60	Chris Buescher	Roush Fenway Racing	Ford	29.449	183.368
11	54	Denny Hamlin	Joe Gibbs Racing	Toyota	29.486	183.138
12	62	Brendan Gaughan	Richard Childress Racing	Chevrolet	29.580	182.556
13	1	Elliott Sadler	Roush Fenway Racing	Ford	29.692	181.867
14	16	Ryan Reed	Roush Fenway Racing	Ford	29.746	181.537
15	25	John Wes Townley	Athenian Motorsports	Chevrolet	29.748	181.525
16	3	Ty Dillon	Richard Childress Racing	Chevrolet	29.757	181.470
17	98	Sam Hornish Jr.	Biagi–DenBeste Racing	Ford	29.769	181.397
18	43	Dakoda Armstrong	Richard Petty Motorsports	Ford	29.891	180.656
19	39	Ryan Sieg	RSS Racing	Chevrolet	29.913	180.524
20	28	J. J. Yeley	JGL Racing	Toyota	29.957	180.258
21	4	Ross Chastain	JD Motorsports	Chevrolet	29.982	180.108
22	42	Brennan Poole	HScott Motorsports	Chevrolet	30.167	179.004
23	19	Mike Bliss	TriStar Motorsports	Toyota	30.211	178.743
24	8	Blake Koch	TriStar Motorsports	Toyota	N/A	
25	51	Jeremy Clements	Jeremy Clements Racing	Chevrolet	29.979	180.126
26	0	Harrison Rhodes	JD Motorsports	Chevrolet	30.153	179.087
27	24	Eric McClure	JGL Racing	Toyota	30.176	178.950
28	14	Cale Conley	TriStar Motorsports	Toyota	30.177	178.944
29	55	Brandon Gdovic	Viva Motorsports	Chevrolet	30.180	178.926
30	01	Landon Cassill	JD Motorsports	Chevrolet	30.200	178.808
31	44	David Starr	TriStar Motorsports	Toyota	30.424	177.491
32	13	Timmy Hill	MBM Motorsports	Dodge	30.515	176.962
33	15	Stanton Barrett	Rick Ware Racing	Ford	30.580	176.586
Qualified via Owner Points
34	90	Mario Gosselin	King Autosport	Chevrolet	OP	
35	10	Jeff Green	TriStar Motorsports	Toyota	OP	
36	70	Derrike Cope	Derrike Cope Racing	Chevrolet	OP	
37	52	Joey Gase	Jimmy Means Racing	Chevrolet	OP	
38	97	Peyton Sellers	Obaika Racing	Chevrolet	OP	
39	40	Derek White	MBM Motorsports	Dodge	OP	
40	74	Mike Harmon	Mike Harmon Racing	Dodge	OP	
Official qualifying result

== Race results ==
Pos	No	Driver	Manufacturer	Laps	Status	Led	Points
1	20	Erik Jones	Toyota	200	running	79	0
2	22	Brad Keselowski	Ford	200	running	56	0
3	88	Dale Earnhardt Jr.	Chevrolet	200	running	25	0
4	7	Regan Smith	Chevrolet	200	running	0	40
5	33	Austin Dillon	Chevrolet	200	running	1	0
6	6	Bubba Wallace	Ford	200	running	3	39
7	54	Denny Hamlin	Toyota	200	running	0	0
8	9	Chase Elliott	Chevrolet	200	running	0	36
9	60	Chris Buescher	Ford	200	running	0	35
10	2	Brian Scott	Chevrolet	200	running	26	35
11	1	Elliott Sadler	Ford	200	running	0	33
12	3	Ty Dillon	Chevrolet	200	running	0	32
13	42	Brennan Poole	Chevrolet	200	running	0	31
14	98	Sam Hornish Jr.	Ford	200	running	0	0
15	16	Ryan Reed	Ford	200	running	0	29
16	43	Dakoda Armstrong	Ford	200	running	7	29
17	25	John Wes Townley	Chevrolet	200	running	0	0
18	18	Daniel Suárez	Toyota	199	running	0	26
19	28	J. J. Yeley	Toyota	199	running	0	25
20	39	Ryan Sieg	Chevrolet	199	running	0	24
21	4	Ross Chastain	Chevrolet	199	running	0	23
22	51	Jeremy Clements	Chevrolet	198	running	0	22
23	44	David Starr	Toyota	198	running	0	21
24	19	Mike Bliss	Toyota	197	running	0	20
25	01	Landon Cassill	Chevrolet	197	running	0	19
26	55	Brandon Gdovic	Chevrolet	196	running	0	18
27	0	Harrison Rhodes	Chevrolet	195	running	0	17
28	90	Mario Gosselin	Chevrolet	195	running	0	16
29	24	Eric McClure	Toyota	192	running	0	15
30	97	Peyton Sellers	Chevrolet	190	running	0	14
31	52	Joey Gase	Chevrolet	186	running	0	13
32	8	Blake Koch	Toyota	182	running	0	12
33	62	Brendan Gaughan	Chevrolet	167	crash	3	12
34	14	Cale Conley	Toyota	165	crash	0	10
35	13	Timmy Hill	Dodge	150	running	0	0
36	70	Derrike Cope	Chevrolet	79	engine	0	8
37	15	Stanton Barrett	Ford	11	engine	0	7
38	10	Jeff Green	Toyota	10	vibration	0	6
39	40	Derek White	Dodge	7	transmission	0	5
40	74	Mike Harmon	Dodge	2	engine	0	4
Race Results

=== Race statistics ===
- 15 lead changes among 8 drivers
- 6 cautions for 30 laps
- Time of race: 2 hour, 15 minute, 21 seconds
- Average speed: 132.989 mph (214.025 km/h)

Lap Leaders
Laps	Leader
1–4	Erik Jones
5–13	Dale Earnhardt Jr.
14	Erik Jones
15–17	Dale Earnhardt Jr.
18	Erik Jones
19–21	Brendan Gaughan
22–47	Brian Scott
48–65	Brad Keselowski
66–82	Erik Jones
83–120	Brad Keselowski
121–123	Bubba Wallace
124–130	Dakoda Armstrong
131	Austin Dillon
132–137	Erik Jones
138–150	Dale Earnhardt Jr.
151–200	Erik Jones

Total laps led
Leader	Laps
Erik Jones	79
Brad Keselowski	56
Brian Scott	26
Dale Earnhardt Jr.	25
Dakoda Armstrong	7
Bubba Wallace	3
Brendan Gaughan	3
Austin Dillon	1

== Standings after the race ==
	Pos	Driver	Points
	1	Ty Dillon	219
	2	Chris Buescher	217 (–2)
	3	Chase Elliott	208 (–11)
1	4	Bubba Wallace	204 (–15)
1	5	Ryan Reed	197 (–22)
2	5	Regan Smith	197 (–22)
1	7	Elliott Sadler	181 (–38)
2	8	Brendan Gaughan	176 (–43)
1	9	Brian Scott	169 (–50)
	10	Daniel Suárez	160 (–59)
2	11	David Starr	157 (–62)
	12	Ross Chastain	148 (–71)

- Note: Only the first 12 positions are included for the driver standings.

Previous race: 2015 Drive4Clots.com 300	NASCAR Xfinity Series; 2015 season	Next race: 2015 Drive to Stop Diabetes 300
