= Austin Dillon's Life in the Fast Lane =

2022 American reality show

- Official poster
- Genre: Reality show
- Starring: Austin Dillon; Whitney Dillon; Paul Swan; Mariel Swan
- Composer: Joshua Myers
- Country of origin: United States
- Original language: English
- No. of seasons: 1
- No. of episodes: 10

Production
- Executive producers: Andrew Duncan; Matthew Pickel; Ken Snow
- Producer: Krista Steinberger
- Cinematography: Ethan Edwards
- Editors: A. J. Valenzuela; Jamie Okubo
- Running time: 21 minutes
- Production company: NBC Sports

Original release
- Network: USA Network
- Release: July 23 – August 25, 2022

Austin Dillon's Life in the Fast Lane is an American reality show following the life and career of Austin Dillon, a NASCAR Cup Series stock car racing driver. The cast also includes his wife Whitney Dillon and their 1-year-old son Ace, as well as his best friend and member of his mechanical crew, Paul Swan, together with his wife, Mariel Swan. The series follows their lives, as they live together in the Dillons' mansion in Lexington, North Carolina. It aired on USA Network from June 23 to August 25, 2022, and has ten 21-minute-long unscripted episodes.

== Premise ==
The reality show follows the homelife of Austin Dillon, a NASCAR Cup Series stock car racing driver. The cast also includes his wife Whitney Dillon and their 1-year-old son Ace, as well as his best friend and member of his mechanical crew, Paul Swan, together with his wife, Mariel Swan. Both women are best friends and former NFL cheerleaders. The series follow the daily lives of both couples as their live together in the Dillions' mansion in Lexington, North Carolina. It also follows Austin Dillon's racing career in the NASCAR Cup Series. Mariel Swan carried the pregnancy throughout the series, giving birth to daughter Bella in the final episode.

== Production ==
The series was announced by Austin Dillon on May 13, 2022 with a post on his X social media account, then known as Twitter. The first official trailer was released on May 31, 2022. The series premiered on June 23, 2022, on the USA Network. It had ten 21-minute-long unscripted episodes, with the final one airing on August 25, 2022.

== Episodes ==
No.	Title	Original airdate
1	"Start Your Engines"	June 23, 2022
NASCAR's Austin Dillon heads to the Daytona Beach, with wife Whitney and friends Paul and Mariel in tow.
2	"Daytona, Baby!"	June 30, 2022
It's the Daytona 500 and Austin's stressed; Whitney, Paul and Mariel help him relax.
3	"V-Day Do-Over"	7 July 2022
After missing Valentine's Day for Daytona, Austin and Paul plan a surprise for Whitney and Mariel.
4	"Daddy Daycare"	July 14, 2022
With Austin, Whitney and Mariel busy, Paul practices for fatherhood while babysitting Ace.
5	"Counting Cards and Cars"	July 28, 2022
Austin, Paul, Whitney and Mariel head to Las Vegas, attempting to win big on the track and the casino.
6	"Plenty of Pit Stops"	August 4, 2022
Austin, Whitney and Mariel start a wild road trip, while Paul attempts building Bella's nursery.
7	"The Dadchelor Party"	August 11, 2022
Austin, Whitney and Mariel throw Paul a party in preparation of baby Bella's arrival.
8	"To Catch a Prankster"	August 18, 2022
An all-out prank war rages as Austin prepares for his upcoming race at the Atlanta Motor Speedway.
9	"Horsepower and Baby Shower"	August 25, 2022
Austin and Paul prep for a hometown race in Charlotte, N.C.; Whitney throws Mariel's baby shower.
10	"It's a Swan-derful Life"	August 25, 2022
In the season finale, Paul and Mariel welcome Baby Bella, and Austin races for first in Charlotte.
