= Affirmative Insurance =

American insurance company

Affirmative Insurance Holdings, Inc
- Company type: Public
- Traded as: AFFM
- Industry: Property & Casualty Insurance
- Founded: 1998
- Headquarters: Addison, Texas
- Key people: Michael J. McClure (CEO)
- Operating income: ▲US$ 209.761 million (2012)
- Total assets: ▲US$ 338.395 million (2012)
- Total equity: ▲US$ 133.254 million (2012)
- Website: www.affirmative.com

Affirmative Insurance Holdings, Inc. is an American company that provides individual consumers non-standard personal automobile insurance policies and other related products through its subsidiaries, independent agents and unaffiliated underwriting agencies in the United States. The company provides liability-only policies including bodily injury liability coverage, property damage liability coverage, personal injury protection coverage and medical payment coverage.

== History ==
In 1998, the company founded in Addison, Texas as Instant Insurance Holdings, Inc.

In 2003, the company completed the acquisition of two non-standard automobile insurance companies from Vesta Insurance Group, Inc.

In 2004, the company completed the initial public offering.

In 2007, the company completed the acquisition of USAgencies, a provider of non-standard automobile insurance.

In 2013, Confie Seguros, a rapidly growing national provider of personal lines insurance signed an agreement to acquire the retail distribution arm of Affirmative Insurance Holdings, Inc.

In 2015, the company filed for chapter 11 bankruptcy.
