= Daniel Suárez =

Mexican–American racing driver (born 1992)

- Suárez at Las Vegas Motor Speedway in 2026
- Born: Daniel Alejandro Suárez Garza; January 7, 1992 (age 34); Monterrey, Nuevo León, Mexico
- Height: 5 ft 9 in (1.75 m)
- Weight: 168 lb (76 kg)
- Achievements: Only Mexican driver to win in the NASCAR Cup Series; Only international champion in the NASCAR Xfinity Series (2016); 2016 NASCAR Xfinity Series Champion; 2026 Coca-Cola 600 Winner; 2017 & 2022 NASCAR All-Star Race Open Winner; 2026 NASCAR All-Star Race Fan Vote Winner
- Awards: 2010 NASCAR Corona Series Rookie of the Year; 2015 NASCAR Xfinity Series Rookie of the Year

NASCAR Cup Series career
- 359 races run over 10 years
- Car no., team: No. 7 (Spire Motorsports)
- 2026 position: 13th
- Best finish: 10th (2022)
- First race: 2017 Daytona 500 (Daytona)
- Last race: 2026 Season Finale 400 (Homestead)
- First win: 2022 Toyota/Save Mart 350 (Sonoma)
- Last win: 2026 Coca-Cola 600 (Charlotte)
Wins	Top tens	Poles
3	84	3

NASCAR O'Reilly Auto Parts Series career
- 89 races run over 8 years
- 2025 position: 104th
- Best finish: 1st (2016)
- First race: 2014 ToyotaCare 250 (Richmond)
- Last race: 2025 The Chilango 150 (Mexico City)
- First win: 2016 Menards 250 (Michigan)
- Last win: 2025 The Chilango 150 (Mexico City)
Wins	Top tens	Poles
4	57	6

NASCAR FedEx Freight Truck Series career
- 29 races run over 5 years
- 2026 position: 114th
- Best finish: 81st (2016)
- First race: 2014 Fred's 250 (Talladega)
- Last race: 2026 Tennessee Army National Guard 250 (Bristol)
- First win: 2016 Lucas Oil 150 (Phoenix)
Wins	Top tens	Poles
1	16	1

NASCAR Mexico Series career
- 77 races run over 7 years
- 2014 position: 6th
- Best finish: 2nd (2013)
- First race: 2011 Regia 200 (Monterrey)
- Last race: 2024 King Taco La Batalla en El coliseo (LA Coliseum)
- First win: 2012 Mexico Nocturna 200 (Mexico City)
- Last win: 2024 King Taco La Batalla en El coliseo (LA Coliseum)
Wins	Top tens	Poles
11	39	13

ARCA Menards Series career
- 5 races run over 2 years
- Best finish: 35th (2015)
- First race: 2014 ZLOOP 150 (Kentucky)
- Last race: 2015 Full Throttle S'loonshine 98.9 (Kansas)
Wins	Top tens	Poles
0	3	1

ARCA Menards Series East career
- 43 races run over 4 years
- Best finish: 3rd (2013)
- First race: 2011 South Boston 150 (South Boston)
- Last race: 2014 Drive Sober 150 (Dover)
- First win: 2013 NAPA 150 (Columbus)
- Last win: 2014 UNOH Battle at the Beach (Daytona)
Wins	Top tens	Poles
3	22	0

ARCA Menards Series West career
- 5 races run over 4 years
- Best finish: 33rd (2018)
- First race: 2011 3 Amigos Organic Blanco 100 (Phoenix)
- Last race: 2018 Carneros 200 (Sonoma)
Wins	Top tens	Poles
0	3	0
- Statistics up to date as of November 8, 2026.

Daniel Alejandro Suárez Garza (born January 7, 1992) is a Mexican professional stock car racing driver. He competes full-time in the NASCAR Cup Series, driving the No. 7 Chevrolet Camaro ZL1 for Spire Motorsports. He previously drove in the NASCAR Toyota Series in Mexico for Telcel Racing, and the NASCAR K&N Pro Series East for Rev Racing as a member of the Drive for Diversity program. Suárez is the 2016 NASCAR Xfinity Series champion with Joe Gibbs Racing, becoming the first foreign-born driver to win a major NASCAR National Series championship.

== Racing career ==
=== Early career ===
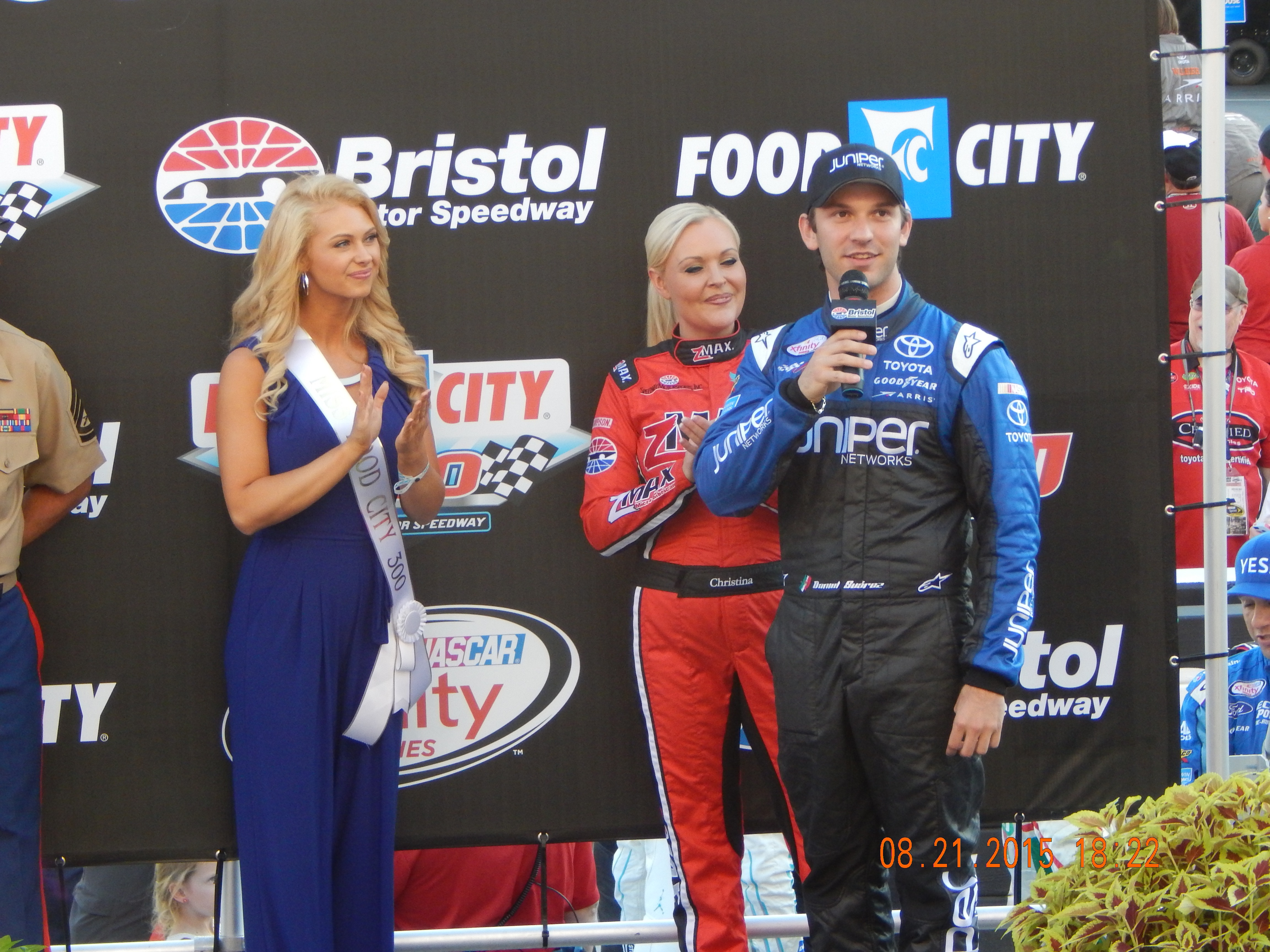
Suárez (right) at Bristol Motor Speedway in 2015

A native of Monterrey in Nuevo León, Suárez began his racing career in karting in 2002. In 2007, he won the class championship. In 2008, he moved to the preliminary category of NASCAR Mexico, Mini-Stocks, where he became the youngest driver to win a race in the series. He moved to the NASCAR Mexico Series in 2010, driving for Telcel Racing and winning the series' Rookie of the Year title. In 2011, Suárez participated in the Toyota All-Star Showdown at Irwindale Speedway, finishing in eleventh, the highest-finishing Mexican driver in the event. In the 2011 NASCAR Mexico Series, he finished the season with three poles and a podium, finishing ninth in the standings. At the same time, he participated in seven races of the NASCAR K&N Pro Series East.

In 2012, he alternated his time between the Mexico Series and the K&N Pro Series East. In Mexico, he led the points for most of the season and entered the final race of the year in contention for the championship, but wound up finishing third, having scored two victories. In the K&N Pro Series East, he finished in sixteenth place in the overall standings, achieving three top-tens in nine races.

Suárez competed for the full season in the K&N Pro Series East in 2013, driving a Toyota for Rev Racing. He scored his first victory in the series at Columbus Motor Speedway, also recorded six top-fives and nine top-ten finishes on his way to third in the championship standings. Meanwhile, he finished runner-up in the NASCAR Toyota Series, achieved three wins and five podium finishes in the season. Suárez was also named to NASCAR's Drive for Diversity program during the 2013 season.

In 2014, Suárez returned to the K&N East and Toyota Series, winning the first two K&N East and first Toyota Series races of the season. In April, he was selected by Joe Gibbs Racing to make his debut in the Nationwide Series at Richmond International Raceway, driving the team's No. 20 Toyota; he finished nineteenth.

=== 2015: Joe Gibbs Racing ===
In August 2014, it was announced that Suárez would compete full-time in the 2015 NASCAR Xfinity Series in the No. 18 Toyota for Joe Gibbs Racing and that he would also run a partial schedule in the 2015 NASCAR Camping World Truck Series in the No. 51 Toyota for Kyle Busch Motorsports.

On July 4, 2015, Suárez won the pole for the Xfinity Series Subway Firecracker 250 at Daytona, his first career pole in the series. Suárez would go on to win two more poles at Iowa and Kentucky and won his first ARCA pole at Kansas. Suárez went on to win the 2015 NASCAR Xfinity Series rookie of the year title, edging Bubba Wallace for the award by one single top-ten finish in statistics. Suárez finished the season fifth in points.

=== 2016: Xfinity Series champion ===
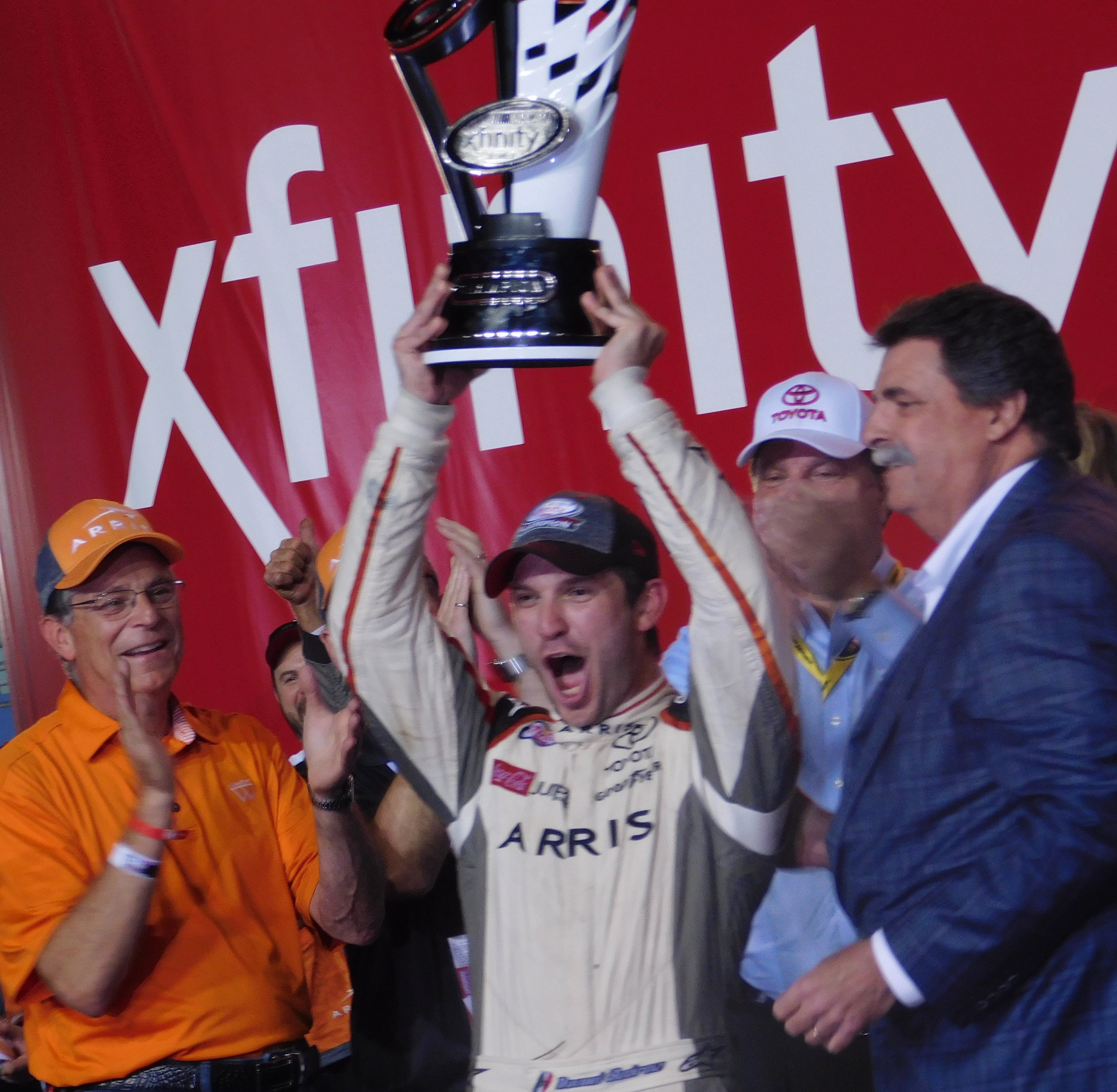
Suárez after winning the 2016 NASCAR Xfinity Series Championship

In 2016, Suárez's car number in the Xfinity Series was switched to No. 19. He won his first Xfinity Series race at Michigan, by passing Kyle Busch on the last lap, becoming the first Mexican-born driver to win in a NASCAR national touring series. Suárez won his second Xfinity Series race during the Round of 12 in the Chase at Dover in October. With this win, he would advance to the Round of 8. In November, Suárez won his first Camping World Truck Series race at Phoenix, taking the lead late in the race after William Byron lost an engine. In the season-ending Xfinity Series race at Homestead, Suárez dominated the race and took the lead on the final restart with two laps to go to score his first Xfinity Series championship. Suárez became the first foreign-born driver to win a NASCAR national series championship.

=== 2017: Move to Cup Series ===
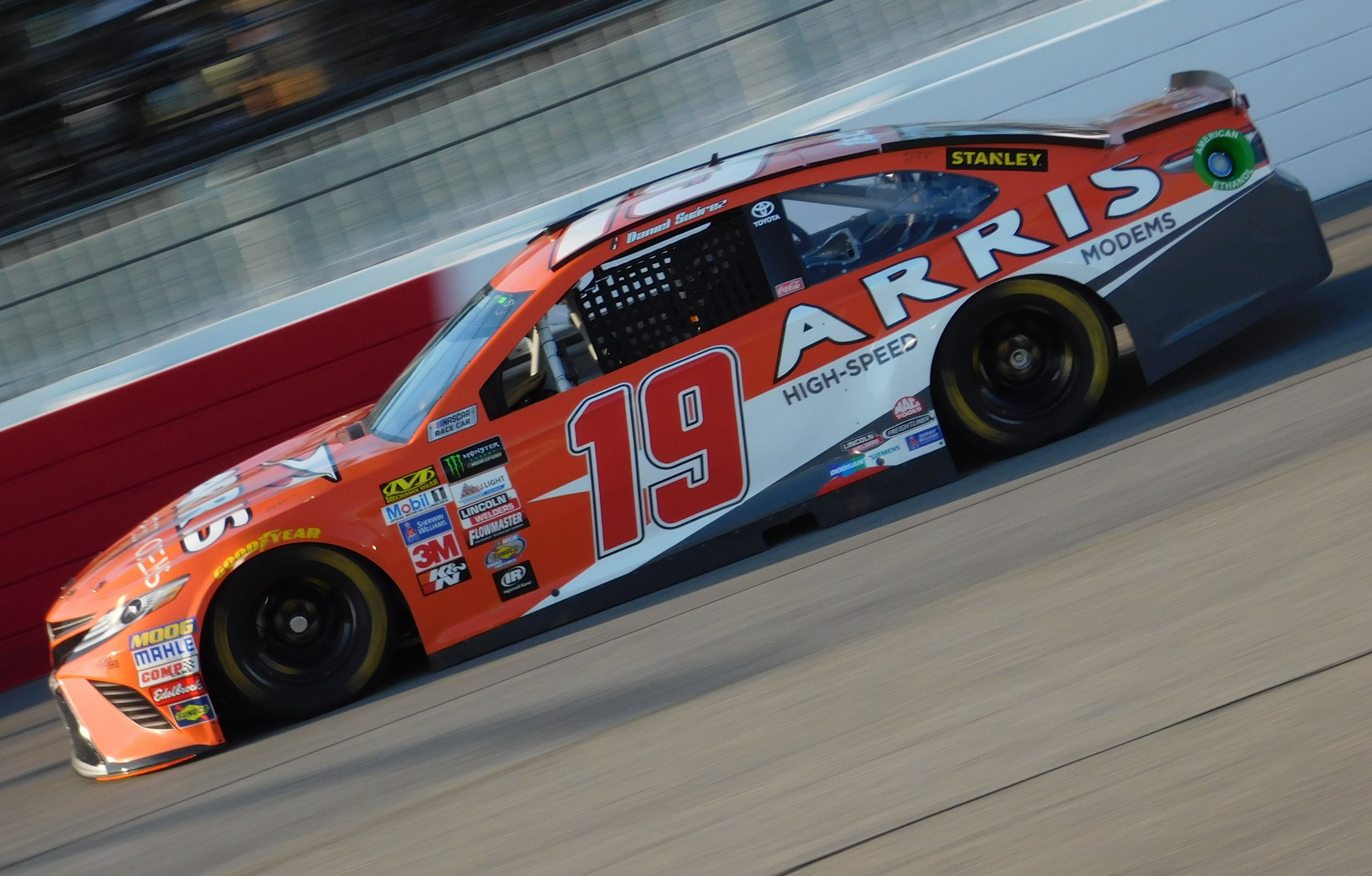
Suárez's No. 19 car at Richmond Raceway in 2017

After the retirement of Carl Edwards, Suárez was tapped to drive the No. 19 Arris / Stanley Tools-sponsored Toyota for JGR. He was paired up with crew chief Dave Rogers. In his first Advance Auto Parts Clash, he finished 8th after starting 16th. Suárez scored a pair of 7th-place finishes at Phoenix and Auto Club. Shortly before the Martinsville race, Suárez's crew chief, Rogers, took an indefinite leave of absence. He was replaced by Scott Graves, who was Suárez's crew chief when he won the 2016 Xfinity Series championship. In May, Suárez won the final stage of the Monster Energy Open, which allowed him to advance into the All-Star Race. In June, Suárez opened the month by finishing a career-best sixth at Dover. Later in the month, Suárez joined MDM Motorsports at Sonoma Raceway for the K&N Pro Series West race, his and MDM's debuts in the series. After qualifying seventh, he finished eleventh. Later in the summer, Suárez earned a series of four consecutive finishes of seventh or better, including a third place finish at Watkins Glen and a Stage 2 winner over stage leader Martin Truex Jr.

During the season, Suárez was involved in controversy with one of his sponsors, Subway. During a publicity event with the help of NBC Sports at the New Hampshire Motor Speedway in July, he gave out free Dunkin' Donuts to fans camping in the infield and the surrounding areas of the track. Nearly two months later, Subway decided to pull out with a race remaining on their contract. After the announcement, Camping World owner Marcus Lemonis tweeted his intention to sponsor Suárez, which took place at Talladega's Alabama 500. Suárez also ran fourteen Xfinity Series races with a best finish of second at the fall Bristol race to his teammate Kyle Busch.

=== 2018 ===
During the 2018 season, Suárez won his first career Cup Series pole at Pocono, after Kevin Harvick and Kyle Busch's qualifying times were disallowed following an inspection. He also scored a career-best second place in the race. Suárez, however, struggled to stay consistent throughout the season with three top-fives and nine top-ten finishes. On October 9, 2018, Rogers returned to replace Graves as Suárez's crew chief.

On September 21, 2018, it was reported that Suárez removed all references to Joe Gibbs Racing from his Twitter profile, hinting that he will leave the team by the end of the 2018 season. On November 7, 2018, it was announced that Suárez would be replaced by Martin Truex Jr. in 2019.

=== 2019: Stewart–Haas Racing ===
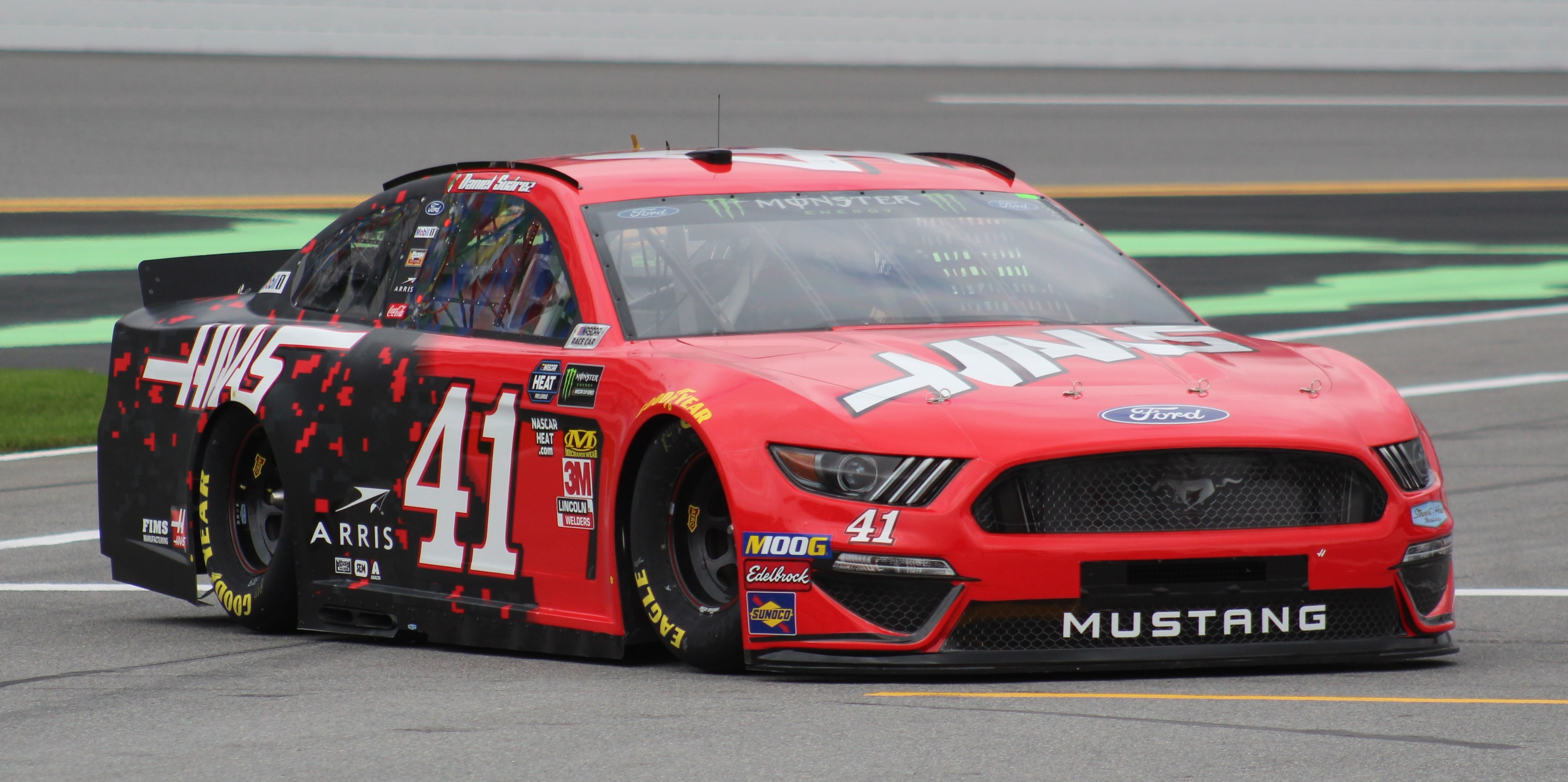
Suárez's No. 41 car at Daytona International Speedway in 2019

On January 7, 2019, it was announced that Suárez signed with Stewart–Haas Racing to drive the No. 41 Ford Mustang GT in the 2019 season. In addition, Suárez brought in Arris to sponsor the team. During qualifying for the 2019 TicketGuardian 500 at Phoenix, Suárez had an on-track incident with Michael McDowell, which resulted in a fight on pit road. Despite showing signs of improvement in performance, Suárez failed to make the 2019 playoffs after finishing eleventh after an on-track incident with Matt Tifft that caused a caution at Indianapolis. On November 14, 2019, it was announced that Suárez would not return to the No. 41 car in 2020.

=== 2020: Gaunt Brothers Racing ===
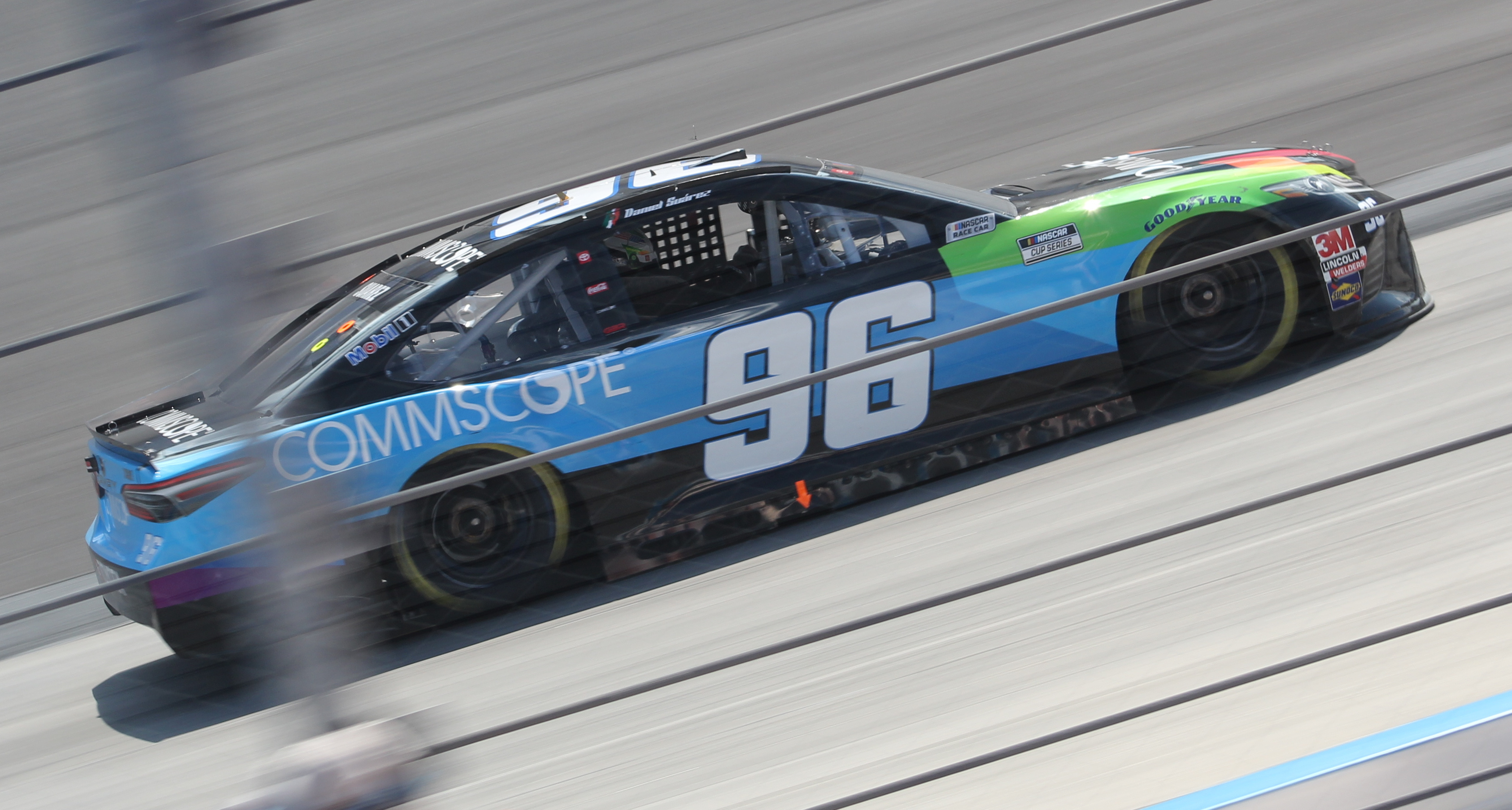
Suárez's No. 96 car at Dover International Speedway in 2020

On January 28, 2020, Suárez officially signed with Gaunt Brothers Racing to race the No. 96 Toyota full-time in 2020. Despite being eligible, he did not participate in the 2020 Busch Clash to focus on the 2020 Daytona 500. Suárez failed to make the Daytona 500 after finishing 22nd in Duel 1 of the 2020 Bluegreen Vacations Duels when he collided with Ryan Blaney in turn 4. Suárez made his official debut with GBR at Las Vegas a week later, but he experienced mechanical issues before the opening lap, resulting in him finishing 30th with four laps down. Throughout the season, he struggled to make a decent finish, with his highest being two eighteenth-place finishes at Bristol and Kansas.

On September 14, 2020, Suárez announced he would not return to Gaunt Brothers Racing at the end of the season. On October 7, 2020, he announced that he would join Justin Marks' new Trackhouse Racing in 2021.

=== 2021: Trackhouse Racing ===
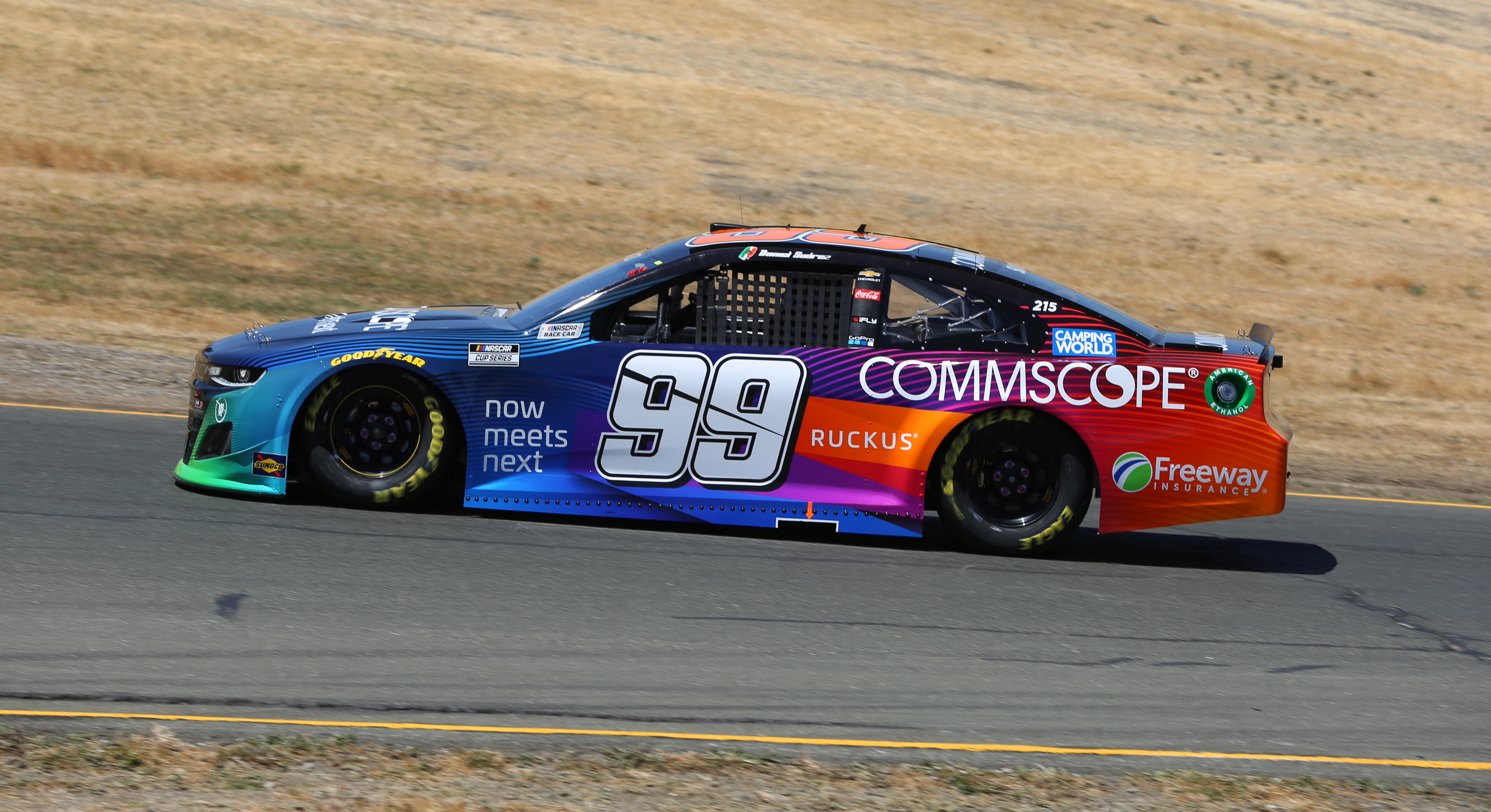
Suárez's No. 99 car at Sonoma Raceway in 2021

For the 2021 season, Suárez joined the No. 99 car for Trackhouse Racing. The No. 99 was last used by Edwards, whom he replaced at JGR (with Edwards giving both Suárez and Trackhouse his blessing for the number). Suárez's run with Trackhouse was seen by many as his best, and very likely his last, chance at resurrecting his career after his struggles the previous few seasons. Although it took time for Suárez and the team to gel, Trackhouse quickly gained a reputation for competitiveness and on-track action during the season with Suárez behind the wheel.

During the 2021 season, Suárez scored Trackhouse's first top-five with a fourth-place finish at the Bristol dirt race. Suárez also scored Top 10's at Dover, Nashville, and Texas. Suárez also competed in the Trans-Am race in Nashville for Marks' SCCA team.

=== 2022: First Cup win ===
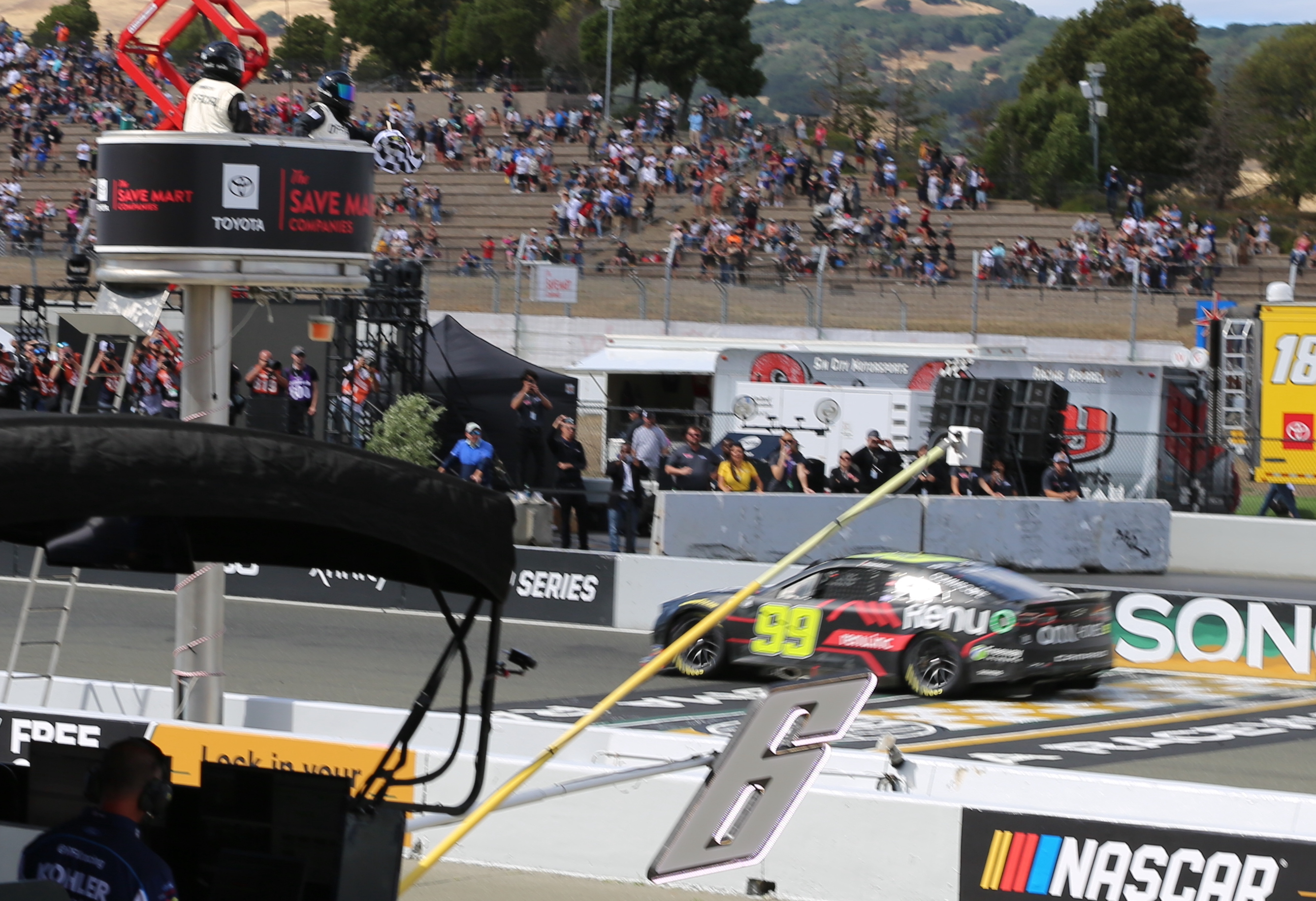
Suárez winning the 2022 Toyota/Save Mart 350

Suárez returned to Trackhouse for the 2022 season after the team acquired multiple charters from Chip Ganassi Racing. In February 2022, Suárez and Trackhouse expanded a sponsorship deal with Freeway Insurance, granting the company primary sponsorship rights for five events throughout the 2022 NASCAR Cup series. At Sonoma, Suárez became the first Mexican-born driver to win a Cup Series race. Suárez was eliminated in the Round of 12 after finishing 36th at the Charlotte Roval. He finished the season at a career-best tenth in the points standings.

In the Truck Series, Suárez relieved an injured Carson Hocevar on lap 11 of the Sonoma race, bringing the No. 42 truck to a sixth place finish.

=== 2023 ===
Suárez started the 2023 season with a 7th-place finish at the 2023 Daytona 500. On March 29, he was fined US$50,000 for intentionally bumping Alex Bowman on pit road following the conclusion of the COTA race. Suárez missed the playoffs and finished 19th in the points standings.

=== 2024: Second career Cup Series win ===
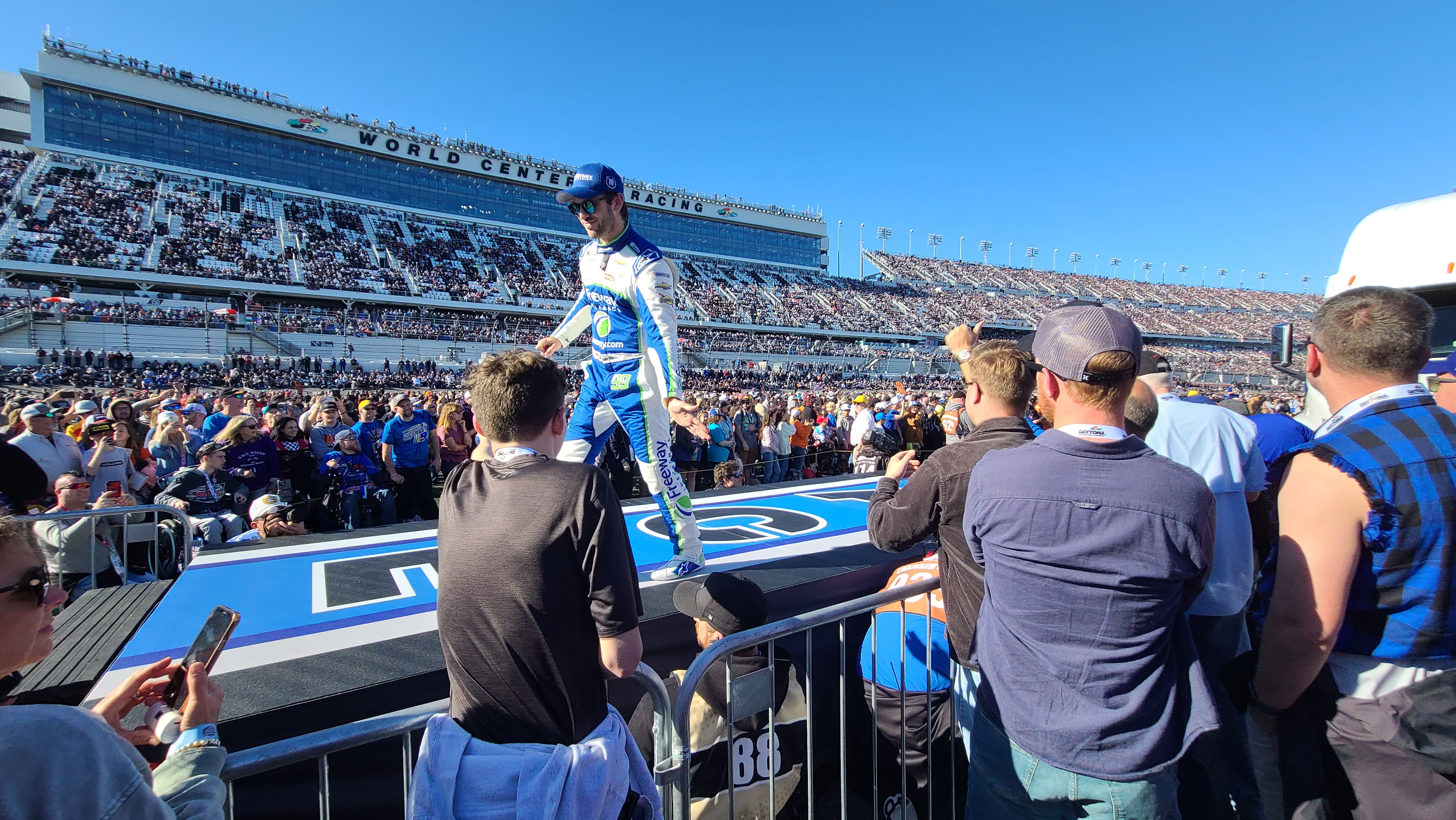
Suárez during driver introductions at the 2024 Daytona 500.

On February 3, 2024, Suárez won the NASCAR Mexico Series race that took place at the Los Angeles Memorial Coliseum.

On February 25, 2024, Suárez achieved his second NASCAR Cup Series win when he finished first in the Ambetter Health 400 at Atlanta Motor Speedway. The end of the race resulted in the fourth closest photo finish in Cup Series history, with Suárez 0.003 seconds ahead of Ryan Blaney and 0.007 seconds ahead of Kyle Busch.

=== 2025: Final year with Trackhouse ===
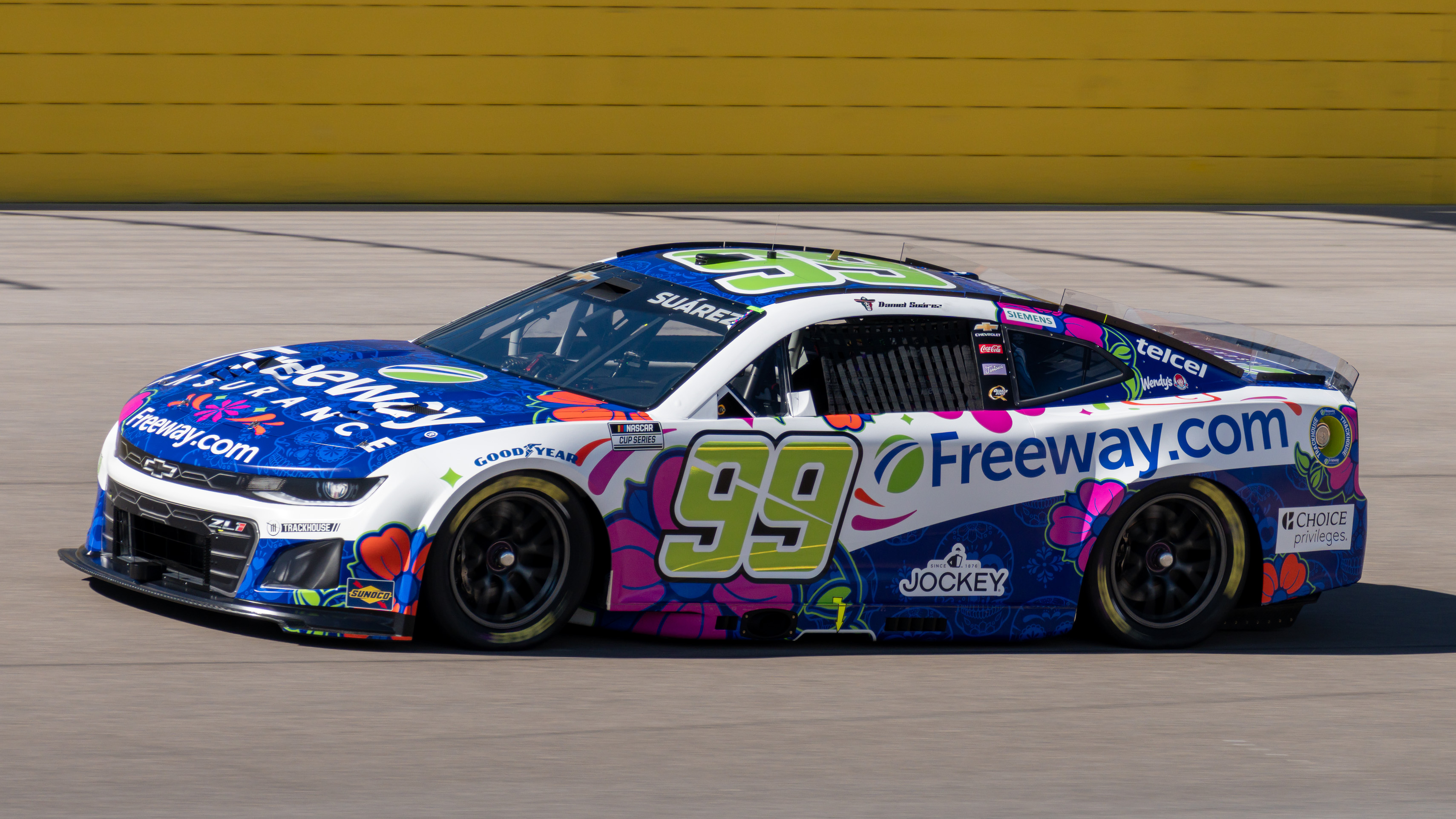
Suárez at the 2025 South Point 400

Suárez started the season on a good note with a thirteenth-place finish in the Daytona 500. Next week at Atlanta, things went south for Suarez as he was involved in a wreck late and got scored 33rd. A second DNF followed at COTA with a 36th place result after getting involved in a wreck with teammate Connor Zilisch, who was making his Cup Series debut this race. A mediocre finish followed next week at Phoenix, where Suarez finished 23rd. At Las Vegas, Suarez scored his first top-five finish of the season with a second-place result, losing the lead to eventual race winner Josh Berry with only thirteen laps to go. On July 1, it was announced that Suárez and Trackhouse mutually agreed to part ways after the season.

In the Xfinity Series, Suárez drove the JR Motorsports No. 9 car to victory lane at Mexico City.

=== 2026: Spire Motorsports ===
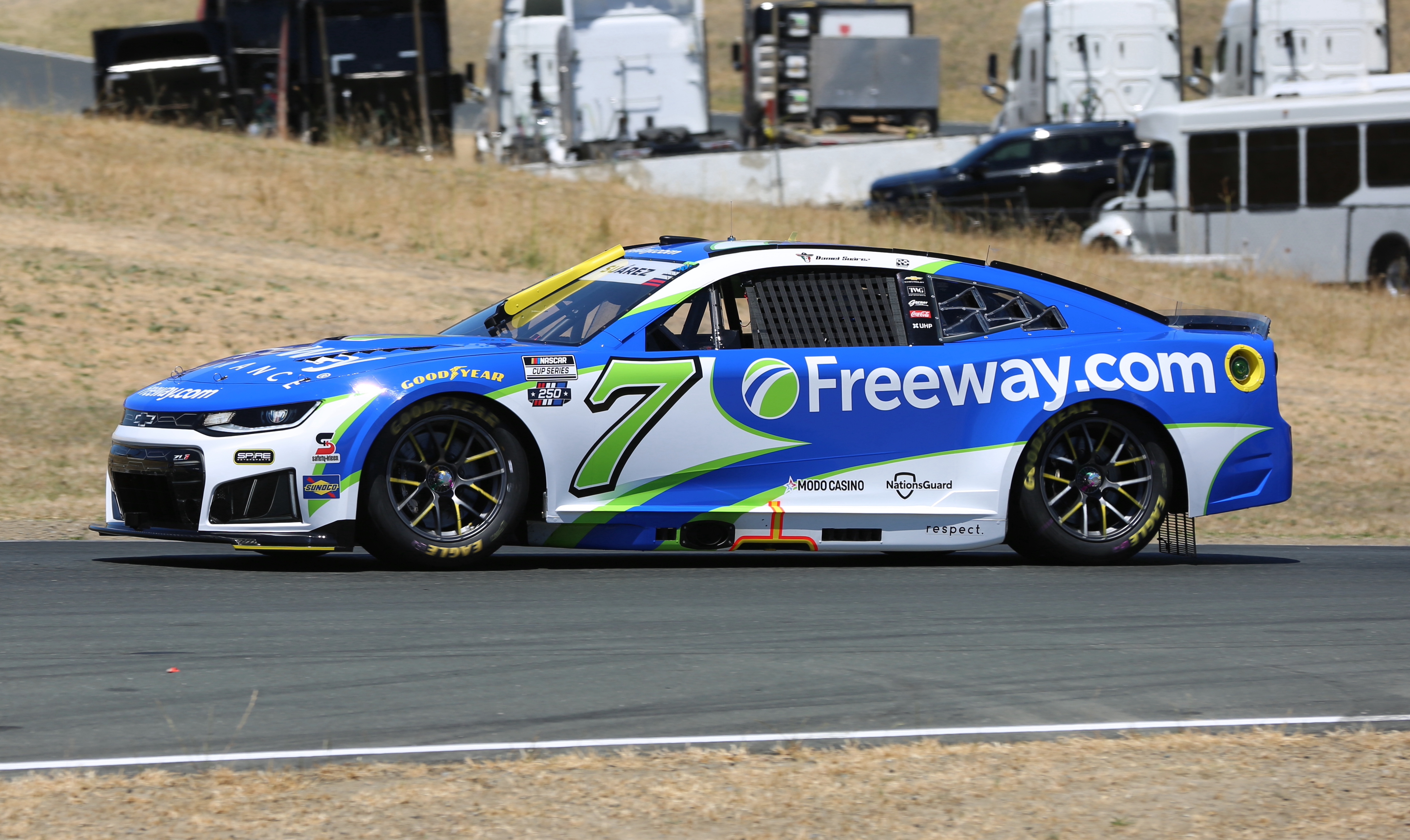
Suárez's No. 7 car at Sonoma Raceway in 2026

On October 22, 2025, it was announced that Suárez will drive the No. 7 Chevrolet for Spire Motorsports for the 2026 season, replacing Justin Haley. He started the season with a 13th place finish at the Daytona. Suárez scored his first win with Spire Motorsports at Charlotte, after rain canceled the rest of the race.

On April 1, it was announced that Suárez would return to the Craftsman Truck Series for the first time since 2021 at Bristol, driving the No. 71 for Spire.

== Personal life ==
Suárez resides in Huntersville, North Carolina. In 2022, Suárez became engaged to Julia Piquet, daughter of three-time Formula One World Champion Nelson Piquet. The couple married on July 30, 2024, in Brazil. The couple welcomed their first child, Otto Suárez Piquet, on September 22, 2026.

On April 29, 2024, Suárez announced via social media that he had passed the U.S. Citizenship Exam. On June 18, 2024, Suárez officially became a dual citizen of Mexico and the United States after completing the Oath of Allegiance.

== In popular culture ==
In 2017, Suárez voiced the character Daniel "Danny" Swérvez in the Pixar film Cars 3.

In 2019, Suárez made a cameo in the movie Stuber.

In 2020, Suárez appeared on The Bump, a video podcast that is part of the WWE Podcast Network. Suárez spoke in a segment that included Rey Mysterio.

From 2022 to 2023, Suárez appeared on the Today Show two times. On the October 14, 2022, episode, Suárez participated in an interview with Tom Llamas about his first NASCAR Cup Series victory. His second appearance came alongside Jeff Gordon on January 25, 2023, where they did an interview to promote NASCAR's 75th season.

== Motorsports career results ==
=== Racing career summary ===
Season	Series	Team	Races	Wins	Top 5	Top 10	Points	Position
2009	NASCAR Corona Series	SC Racing	4	0	0	0	406	32nd
2010	NASCAR Corona Series	SC Racing	6	0	0	0	1684	13th
2010	NASCAR Corona Series	Equipo Telcel	8	0	1	5	1684	13th
2011	NASCAR Corona Series	Equipo Telcel	14	0	3	7	1769	9th
2011	NASCAR K&N Pro Series West	Lori Williams	1	0	0	0	225	54th
2011	NASCAR K&N Pro Series West	X Team Racing	1	0	0	1	225	54th
2011	NASCAR K&N Pro Series East	Lori Williams	3	0	0	0	888	23rd
2011	NASCAR K&N Pro Series East	X Team Racing	4	0	1	3	888	23rd
2012	NASCAR Toyota Series	Equipo Telcel	14	2	9	9	504	**3rd**
2012	NASCAR K&N Pro Series West	X Team Racing	1	0	1	1	41	52nd
2012	NASCAR K&N Pro Series East	X Team Racing	9	0	1	3	659	16th
2013	NASCAR Toyota Series	Equipo Telcel	15	3	6	9	1190	**2nd**
2013	NASCAR K&N Pro Series East	Rev Racing	14	1	6	9	494	**3rd**
2014	NASCAR Toyota Series	Equipo Telcel	15	5	7	9	1177	6th
2014	NASCAR K&N Pro Series East	Rev Racing	13	2	4	7	397	17th
2014	ARCA Racing Series	Venturini Motorsports	1	0	1	1	220	74th
2014	NASCAR Camping World Truck Series	Win-Tron Racing	1	0	0	0	0	NC†
2014	NASCAR Nationwide Series	Joe Gibbs Racing	1	0	0	0	54	46th
2014	NASCAR Nationwide Series	RAB Racing	1	0	0	0	54	46th
2015	ARCA Racing Series	Venturini Motorsports	4	0	1	2	690	35th
2015	NASCAR Camping World Truck Series	Kyle Busch Motorsports	13	0	7	10	0	NC†
2015	NASCAR Xfinity Series	Joe Gibbs Racing	33	0	8	18	1078	5th
2016	NASCAR Camping World Truck Series	Kyle Busch Motorsports	13	1	3	6	0	NC†
2016	NASCAR Xfinity Series	Joe Gibbs Racing	33	3	19	27	4040	**1st**
2017	NASCAR K&N Pro Series West	MDM Motorsports	1	0	0	0	33	43rd
2017	NASCAR Xfinity Series	Joe Gibbs Racing	14	0	5	8	0	NC†
2017	Monster Energy NASCAR Cup Series	Joe Gibbs Racing	36	0	1	12	777	20th
2018	NASCAR K&N Pro Series West	DGR-Crosley	1	0	1	1	41	33rd
2018	NASCAR Xfinity Series	Joe Gibbs Racing	2	0	1	2	0	NC†
2018	Monster Energy NASCAR Cup Series	Joe Gibbs Racing	36	0	3	9	674	21st
2019	Monster Energy NASCAR Cup Series	Stewart-Haas Racing	36	0	4	11	846	17th
2020	NASCAR Cup Series	Gaunt Brothers Racing	35	0	0	0	365	31st
2021	NASCAR Camping World Truck Series	Young's Motorsports	1	0	0	0	0	NC†
2021	NASCAR Cup Series	Trackhouse Racing	36	0	1	4	634	25th
2022	NASCAR Cup Series	Trackhouse Racing	36	1	6	13	2272	10th
2023	SRX Series	N/A	1	0	1	1	0	NC†
2023	ASA STARS National Tour	Rackley W. A. R.	1	0	1	1	70	52nd
2023	CARS Late Model Stock Car Tour	R&S Race Cars	1	0	0	0	18	61st
2023	NASCAR Xfinity Series	Kaulig Racing	1	0	0	1	0	NC†
2023	NASCAR Xfinity Series	SS-Greenlight Racing	1	0	0	0	0	NC†
2023	NASCAR Cup Series	Trackhouse Racing	36	0	3	10	756	19th
2024	NASCAR Brasil Sprint Race	Singus Competition	3	1	2	3	0	NC†
2024	NASCAR Mexico Series	Jimmy Morales	1	1	1	1	0	NC†
2024	NASCAR Xfinity Series	SS-Greenlight Racing	1	0	0	0	0	NC†
2024	NASCAR Xfinity Series	DGM Racing	1	0	0	0	0	NC†
2024	NASCAR Cup Series	Trackhouse Racing	36	1	4	9	2226	12th
2025	NASCAR Xfinity Series	JR Motorsports	1	1	1	1	0	NC†
2025	NASCAR Cup Series	Trackhouse Racing	36	0	2	7	611	29th
2026	NASCAR Craftsman Truck Series	Spire Motorsports	1	0	0	0	0	NC†
2026	NASCAR Cup Series	Spire Motorsports	26	1	3	7	2225*	11th*

=== NASCAR ===
(key) (Bold – Pole position awarded by qualifying time. Italics – Pole position earned by points standings or practice time. * – Most laps led.)

==== Cup Series ====
NASCAR Cup Series results
Year	Team	No.	Make	1	2	3	4	5	6	7	8	9	10	11	12	13	14	15	16	17	18	19	20	21	22	23	24	25	26	27	28	29	30	31	32	33	34	35	36	NCSC	Pts	Ref
2017	Joe Gibbs Racing	19	Toyota	DAY; 29	ATL; 21	LVS; 20	PHO; 7	CAL; 7	MAR; 32	TEX; 19	BRI; 18	RCH; 12	TAL; 19	KAN; 7	CLT; 11	DOV; 6	POC; 15	MCH; 24	SON; 16	DAY; 17	KEN; 18	NHA; 6	IND; 7	POC; 7	GLN; 3	MCH; 37	BRI; 15	DAR; 38	RCH; 7	CHI; 12	NHA; 8	DOV; 8	CLT; 6	TAL; 15	KAN; 36	MAR; 15	TEX; 14	PHO; 18	HOM; 34	20th	777	
2018	Joe Gibbs Racing	19	Toyota	DAY; 37	ATL; 15	LVS; 26	PHO; 8	CAL; 23	MAR; 18	TEX; 29	BRI; 11	RCH; 10	TAL; 10	DOV; 3	KAN; 28	CLT; 15	POC; 24	MCH; 30	SON; 15	CHI; 11	DAY; 35	KEN; 15	NHA; 22	**POC**; 2	GLN; 4	MCH; 11	BRI; 18	DAR; 29	IND; 18	LVS; 8	RCH; 17	ROV; 21	DOV; 10	TAL; 16	KAN; 24	MAR; 9	TEX; 28	PHO; 36	HOM; 30	21st	674	
2019	Stewart–Haas Racing	41	Ford	DAY; 33	ATL; 10	LVS; 17	PHO; 23	CAL; 13	MAR; 10	TEX; 3	BRI; 8	RCH; 18	TAL; 12	DOV; 11	KAN; 14	CLT; 18	POC; 8	MCH; 4	SON; 17	CHI; 24	DAY; 40	**KEN**; 8	NHA; 19	POC; 24	GLN; 17	MCH; 5	BRI; 8	DAR; 11	IND; 11	LVS; 20	RCH; 9	ROV; 34	DOV; 14	TAL; 32	KAN; 32	MAR; 31	TEX; 3	PHO; 15	HOM; 14	17th	846	
2020	Gaunt Brothers Racing	96	Toyota	DAY; DNQ	LVS; 30	CAL; 28	PHO; 21	DAR; 25	DAR; 27	CLT; 28	CLT; 28	BRI; 18	ATL; 31	MAR; 27	HOM; 31	TAL; 28	POC; 28	POC; 26	IND; 20	KEN; 26	TEX; 23	KAN; 18	NHA; 26	MCH; 24	MCH; 26	DRC; 27	DOV; 30	DOV; 28	DAY; 26	DAR; 25	RCH; 29	BRI; 26	LVS; 29	TAL; 34	ROV; 25	KAN; 27	TEX; 27	MAR; 27	PHO; 31	31st	365	
2021	Trackhouse Racing	99	Chevy	DAY; 36	DRC; 16	HOM; 15	LVS; 26	PHO; 21	ATL; 17	BRD; 4	MAR; 32	RCH; 16	TAL; 23	KAN; 11	DAR; 23	DOV; 9	COA; 33	CLT; 15	SON; 12	NSH; 7	POC; 13	POC; 15	ROA; 36	ATL; 36	NHA; 20	GLN; 31	IRC; 37	MCH; 22	DAY; 19	DAR; 13	RCH; 17	BRI; 22	LVS; 15	TAL; 23	ROV; 13	TEX; 10	KAN; 15	MAR; 28	PHO; 21	25th	634	
2022	Trackhouse Racing	99	Chevy	DAY; 18	CAL; 4	LVS; 37	PHO; 9	ATL; 4	COA; 24	RCH; 16	MAR; 29	BRD; 12	TAL; 31	DOV; 14	DAR; 10	KAN; 33	CLT; 25	GTW; 23	SON; 1*	NSH; 15	ROA; 5	ATL; 6	NHA; 9	POC; 3	IRC; 28	MCH; 25	RCH; 19	GLN; 5	DAY; 24	DAR; 18	KAN; 10	BRI; 19	TEX; 12	TAL; 8	ROV; 36	LVS; 16	HOM; 10	MAR; 12	PHO; 24	10th	2272	
2023	Trackhouse Racing	99	Chevy	DAY; 7	CAL; 4	LVS; 10	PHO; 22	ATL; 29	COA; 27	RCH; 23	BRD; 25	MAR; 17	TAL; 9	DOV; 35	KAN; 15	DAR; 34	CLT; 23	GTW; 7	SON; 22	NSH; 12	CSC; 27	ATL; 2	NHA; 16	POC; 36	RCH; 33	MCH; 6	**IRC**; 3	GLN; 22	DAY; 20	DAR; 34	KAN; 16	BRI; 21	TEX; 8	TAL; 10	ROV; 33	LVS; 15	HOM; 16	MAR; 34	PHO; 11	19th	756	
2024	Trackhouse Racing	99	Chevy	DAY; 34	ATL; 1	LVS; 11	PHO; 13	BRI; 18	COA; 31	RCH; 22	MAR; 22	TEX; 5	TAL; 27	DOV; 18	KAN; 27	DAR; 24	CLT; 24	GTW; 23	SON; 14	IOW; 9	NHA; 21	NSH; 22	CSC; 11	POC; 16	IND; 8	RCH; 10	MCH; 8	DAY; 40	DAR; 18	ATL; 2	GLN; 13	BRI; 31	KAN; 13	TAL; 26	ROV; 30	LVS; 3	HOM; 16	MAR; 23	PHO; 10	12th	2226	
2025	Trackhouse Racing	99	Chevy	DAY; 13	ATL; 33	COA; 36	PHO; 23	LVS; 2	HOM; 22	MAR; 21	DAR; 15	BRI; 33	TAL; 9	TEX; 10	KAN; 34	CLT; 36	NSH; 16	MCH; 14	MXC; 19	POC; 15	ATL; 34	CSC; 29	SON; 14	DOV; 26	IND; 27	IOW; 25	GLN; 7	RCH; 7	DAY; 2	DAR; 25	GTW; 35	BRI; 37	NHA; 36	KAN; 17	ROV; 7	LVS; 20	TAL; 12	MAR; 22	PHO; 19	29th	611	
2026	Spire Motorsports	7	Chevy	DAY; 13	ATL; 5	COA; 25	PHO; 30	LVS; 18	DAR; 7	MAR; 20	BRI; 12	KAN; 19	TAL; 12	TEX; 6	GLN; 13	CLT; 1	NSH; 19	MCH; 6	POC; 13	COR; 13	SON; 31	CHI; 14	ATL; 21	NWS; 9	IND; 17	IOW; 23	RCH; 16	NHA; 17	DAY; 2	DAR; 21	GTW; 29	BRI; 14	KAN; 14	LVS; 14	CLT; 13	PHO; 7	TAL; 18	MAR; 28	HOM; 8	13th	2243	

===== Daytona 500 =====
Year	Team	Manufacturer	Start	Finish
2017	Joe Gibbs Racing	Toyota	19	29
2018	Joe Gibbs Racing	Toyota	17	37
2019	Stewart–Haas Racing	Ford	23	33
2020	Gaunt Brothers Racing	Toyota	DNQ	
2021	Trackhouse Racing	Chevrolet	15	36
2022	Trackhouse Racing	Chevrolet	21	18
2023	Trackhouse Racing	Chevrolet	24	7
2024	Trackhouse Racing	Chevrolet	13	34
2025	Trackhouse Racing	Chevrolet	36	13
2026	Spire Motorsports	Chevrolet	15	13

==== Xfinity Series ====
NASCAR Xfinity Series results
Year	Team	No.	Make	1	2	3	4	5	6	7	8	9	10	11	12	13	14	15	16	17	18	19	20	21	22	23	24	25	26	27	28	29	30	31	32	33	NXSC	Pts	Ref
2014	Joe Gibbs Racing	20	Toyota	DAY	PHO	LVS	BRI	CAL	TEX	DAR	RCH; 19	TAL	IOW	CLT	DOV	MCH	ROA	KEN	DAY	NHA	CHI	IND	IOW	GLN	MOH	BRI	ATL	RCH									46th	54	
2014	RAB Racing	29	Toyota																										CHI; 15	KEN	DOV	KAN	CLT	TEX	PHO	HOM	46th	54	
2015	Joe Gibbs Racing	18	Toyota	DAY; 39	ATL; 14	LVS; 10	PHO; 11	CAL; 13	TEX; 18	BRI; 2	RCH; 6	TAL; 31	IOW; 18	CLT; 6	DOV; 19	MCH; 20	CHI; 7	**DAY**; 15	KEN; 4	NHA; 5	IND; 3	**IOW**; 6	GLN; 15	MOH; 11	BRI; 5	ROA; 24	DAR; 3	RCH; 12	CHI; 6	**KEN**; 22	DOV; 10	CLT; 4	KAN; 9	TEX; 6	PHO; 4	HOM; 6	5th	1078	
2016	Joe Gibbs Racing	19	Toyota	DAY; 8	ATL; 7	LVS; 2	PHO; 3	**CAL**; 4	TEX; 16	BRI; 6	RCH; 4	TAL; 7	DOV; 9	CLT; 12	POC; 9	MCH; 1	IOW; 4	DAY; 32	KEN; 3	NHA; 4	IND; 7	**IOW**; 30	GLN; 4	MOH; 23	BRI; 30	ROA; 4	DAR; 3	RCH; 8	CHI; 4	KEN; 2	DOV; 1	CLT; 3	KAN; 3	TEX; 5	PHO; 5	**HOM**; 1*	1st	4040	
2017	Joe Gibbs Racing	18	Toyota	DAY; 34	ATL		PHO; 39	CAL	TEX; 12	BRI; 3	RCH; 21	TAL; 9	CLT	DOV; 3	POC; 5	MCH	IOW	DAY; 39	KEN	NHA	IND	IOW	GLN	MOH					CHI; 19	KEN	DOV; 7	**CLT**; 8*	KAN	TEX	PHO	HOM	94th	0^{1}	
2017	Joe Gibbs Racing	20	Toyota			LVS; 3																			BRI; 2	ROA	DAR	RCH									94th	0^{1}	
2018	Joe Gibbs Racing	18	Toyota	DAY; 8	ATL	LVS	PHO	CAL	TEX	BRI	RCH	TAL	DOV	CLT	POC	MCH	IOW	CHI; 4	DAY	KEN	NHA	IOW	GLN	MOH	BRI	ROA	DAR	IND	LVS	RCH	ROV	DOV	KAN	TEX	PHO	HOM	93rd	0^{1}	
2023	Kaulig Racing	10	Chevy																			POC; 10	ROA	MCH	IRC	GLN	DAY	DAR	KAN	BRI	TEX	ROV	LVS	HOM	MAR	PHO	89th	0^{1}	
2023	SS-Green Light Racing	07	Chevy	DAY	CAL	LVS	PHO	ATL	COA	RCH	MAR	TAL	DOV	DAR	CLT	PIR	SON; 27	NSH	CSC	ATL	NHA																89th	0^{1}	
2024	SS-Green Light Racing	14	Chevy	DAY; 35	ATL	LVS	PHO	COA	RCH	MAR	TEX	TAL	DOV	DAR	CLT	PIR	SON	IOW	NHA	NSH																	103rd	0^{1}	
2024	DGM Racing	36	Chevy																		CSC; 27	POC	IND	MCH	DAY	DAR	ATL	GLN	BRI	KAN	TAL	ROV	LVS	HOM	MAR	PHO	103rd	0^{1}	
2025	JR Motorsports	9	Chevy	DAY	ATL	COA	PHO	LVS	HOM	MAR	DAR	BRI	CAR	TAL	TEX	CLT	NSH	MXC; 1*	POC	ATL	CSC	SON	DOV	IND	IOW	GLN	DAY	PIR	GTW	BRI	KAN	ROV	LVS	TAL	MAR	PHO	104th	0^{1}	

==== Craftsman Truck Series ====
NASCAR Craftsman Truck Series results
Year	Team	No.	Make	1	2	3	4	5	6	7	8	9	10	11	12	13	14	15	16	17	18	19	20	21	22	23	24	25	NCTC	Pts	Ref
2014	Win-Tron Racing	35	Toyota	DAY	MAR	KAN	CLT	DOV	TEX	GTW	KEN	IOW	ELD	POC	MCH	BRI	MSP	CHI	NHA	LVS	TAL; 15	MAR	TEX	PHO	HOM				98th	0^{1}	
2015	Kyle Busch Motorsports	51	Toyota	DAY; 9	ATL; 4	MAR; 6	KAN; 6	CLT	DOV; 2	TEX; 2	GTW	IOW	KEN; 4	ELD	POC	MCH	BRI; 30	MSP	CHI; 4	NHA	LVS	TAL	MAR; 16	TEX; 2	PHO; 4	HOM; 30			85th	0^{1}	
2016	Kyle Busch Motorsports	51	Toyota	DAY; 28	ATL; 31	MAR; 18	KAN	DOV; 2	CLT; 23	TEX	IOW; 6	GTW	**KEN**; 11	ELD	POC	BRI; 29	MCH	MSP	CHI; 11	NHA	LVS	TAL	MAR; 6	TEX; 5	PHO; 1	HOM; 6			81st	0^{1}	
2021	Young's Motorsports	02	Chevy	DAY	DRC	LVS	ATL	BRD; 17	RCH	KAN	DAR	COA	CLT	TEX	NSH	POC	KNX	GLN	GTW	DAR	BRI	LVS	TAL	MAR	PHO				107th	0^{1}	
2022	Niece Motorsports	42	Chevy	DAY	LVS	ATL	COA	MAR	BRD	DAR	KAN	TEX	CLT	GTW	SON; RL^{†}	KNX	NSH	MOH	POC	IRP	RCH	KAN	BRI	TAL	HOM	PHO			N/A	–	
2026	Spire Motorsports	71	Chevy	DAY	ATL	STP	DAR	CAR	BRI; 18	TEX	GLN	DOV	CLT	NSH	MCH	COR	LRP	NWS	IRP	RCH	NHA	BRI	KAN	CLT	PHO	TAL	MAR	HOM	114th	0^{1}	
^{†} – Relieved Carson Hocevar

^{*} Season still in progress
^{1} Ineligible for series points

==== K&N Pro Series East ====
NASCAR K&N Pro Series East results
Year	Team	No.	Make	1	2	3	4	5	6	7	8	9	10	11	12	13	14	15	16	NKNPSEC	Pts	Ref
2011	Lori Williams	12	Dodge	GRE	SBO; 18	RCH; 20	IOW; 17													23rd	888	
2011	X Team Racing	16	Toyota					BGS	JFC; 14	LGY	NHA; 7	COL; 5	GRE	NHA; 8	DOV					23rd	888	
2012	X Team Racing	16	Toyota	BRI; 15																16th	259	
2012	X Team Racing	14	Toyota		GRE; 10	RCH; 29	IOW; 13	BGS; 22	JFC; 19	LGY	CNB	COL; 5		NHA; 15	DOV	GRE	CAR			16th	259	
2012	X Team Racing	74	Toyota										IOW; 9							16th	259	
2013	Rev Racing	6	Toyota	BRI; 26	GRE; 7	FIF; 13	RCH; 21	BGS; 9		LGY; 2	COL; 1*		VIR; 18	GRE; 2*	NHA; 2	DOV; 6	RAL; 2			3rd	494	
2013	Rev Racing	69	Toyota						IOW; 13			IOW; 3								3rd	494	
2014	Rev Racing	6	Toyota	NSM; 1*	DAY; 1*	BRI; 26	GRE; 5	RCH; 32	IOW; 7	BGS; 2	FIF; 21	LGY; 10	NHA; 31	COL	IOW; 9	GLN; 19	VIR	GRE	DOV; 22	17th	397	

==== K&N Pro Series West ====
NASCAR K&N Pro Series West results
Year	Team	No.	Make	1	2	3	4	5	6	7	8	9	10	11	12	13	14	15	NKNPSWC	Pts	Ref
2011	Lori Williams	86	Dodge	PHO; 31	AAS	MMP	IOW	LVS	SON	IRW	EVG	PIR	CNS	MRP	SPO	AAS			54th	225	
2011	X Team Racing	76	Toyota														PHO; 6		54th	225	
2012	X Team Racing	76	Toyota	PHO; 3	LHC	MMP	S99	IOW	BIR	LVS	SON	EVG	CNS	IOW	PIR	SMP	AAS	PHO	52nd	41	
2017	MDM Motorsports	12	Toyota	KCR	TUS	IRW	IRW	SPO	OSS	CNS	SON; 11	IOW	EVG	DCS	MER	AAS	KCR		43rd	33	
2018	DGR-Crosley	54	Toyota	KCR	TUS	TUS	OSS	CNS	SON; 4	DCS	IOW	EVG	GTW	LVS	MER	AAS	KCR		33rd	41	

==== Mexico Series ====
NASCAR Mexico Series results
Year	Team	No.	Make	1	2	3	4	5	6	7	8	9	10	11	12	13	14	15	NTSC	Pts	Ref
2009	SC Racing	04	Chevy	AGS	TXG	SLP	PUE	QRO	GDL	ZAC	SLP	PUE; 14	MTY	QRO; 20	MXC; 20	TXG	AGS; 28		32nd	406	
2010	SC Racing	04	Chevy	AGS; 12	QRO; 17	SLP; 17		MXC; 18	PUE; 29										13th	1684	
2010	SC Racing	4	Chevy				TXG; 29												13th	1684	
2010	Equipo Telcel	3	Dodge							GDL; 6	MTY; 5	SLP; 20	MXC; 7	QRO; 7	PUE; 26	TXG; 6	AGS; 12		13th	1684	
2011	Equipo Telcel	3	Dodge	MTY; 12	SLP; 19	AGS; 10	TUX; 25	QRO; 7	PUE; 34	MXC; 15	SLP; 7	**MTY**; 4	QRO; 3	PUE; 19	SLP; 4	**AGS**; 29	**MXC**; 7		9th	1769	
2012	Equipo Telcel	03	Dodge	MTY; 12															3rd	504	
2012	Equipo Telcel	3	Dodge		**SLP**; 3	QRO; 2	MXC; 1	PUE; 25	AGS; 2	MXC; 5	SLP; 2	**QRO**; 1	**AGS**; 2	PUE; 15	MTY; 3	CHI; 30*	MXC; 25		3rd	504	
2013	Equipo Telcel	3	Toyota	PHO; 11	SLP; 9	MXC; 6	**QRO**; 4	**CHI**; 1*	AGS; 27	PUE; 33	MTY; 1	QRO; 26	MXC; 29	SLP; 10	PUE; 2	AGS; 2*	**TUX**; 24*	**MXC**; 1*	2nd	1190	
2014	Equipo Telcel	3	Toyota	PHO; 1	MXC; 2	TUX; 1*	MTY; 1	**SLP**; 11*	QRO; 3	**MXC**; 1	**AGS**; 16	QRO; 24	PUE; 18	CHI; 7*	SLP; 23	AGS; 1	TUX; 28	**PUE**; 6*	6th	1177	
2024	Jimmy Morales	99	Chevy	LAC; 1	SLP	TUX	CHI	AGS	MTY	PUE	SLP	QRO	AGS	CHI	PUE	MXC			-	-	

==== Brasil Series ====
NASCAR Brasil Sprint Race results
Year	Team	No.	Make	1		2		3		4		5			6		7		8			NBSC	Pts	Ref
2024	Singus Competition	91	Chevy	MS1	MS2	GO1	GO2	PR1	PR2	MG1	MG2	SP1; 6	SP2; 1	**SP3**; 3	PR1	PR2	RS1	RS2	MG1	MG2	MG3	-*	0^{1}	

=== ARCA Racing Series ===
(key) (Bold – Pole position awarded by qualifying time. Italics – Pole position earned by points standings or practice time. * – Most laps led.)

ARCA Racing Series results
Year	Team	No.	Make	1	2	3	4	5	6	7	8	9	10	11	12	13	14	15	16	17	18	19	20	ARSC	Pts	Ref
2014	Venturini Motorsports	66	Toyota	DAY	MOB	SLM	TAL	TOL	NJE	POC	MCH	ELK	WIN	CHI	IRP	POC	BLN	ISF	MAD	DSF	SLM	KEN; 5	KAN	74th	220	
2015	Venturini Motorsports	15	Toyota	DAY; 2	MOB	NSH	SLM	TAL	TOL	NJE	POC	MCH	CHI; 22	WIN	IOW	IRP	POC	BLN	ISF	DSF	SLM	KEN; 6*		35th	690	
2015	Venturini Motorsports	55	Toyota																				**KAN**; 20	35th	690	

=== CARS Late Model Stock Car Tour ===
(key) (Bold – Pole position awarded by qualifying time. Italics – Pole position earned by points standings or practice time. * – Most laps led. ** – All laps led.)

CARS Late Model Stock Car Tour results
Year	Team	No.	Make	1	2	3	4	5	6	7	8	9	10	11	12	13	14	15	16	CLMSCTC	Pts	Ref
2023	R&S Race Cars	99S	Chevy	SNM	FLC	HCY	ACE	NWS; 15	LGY	DOM	CRW	HCY	ACE	TCM	WKS	AAS	SBO	TCM	CRW	61st	18	

=== ASA STARS National Tour ===
(key) (Bold – Pole position awarded by qualifying time. Italics – Pole position earned by points standings or practice time. * – Most laps led. ** – All laps led.)

ASA STARS National Tour results
Year	Team	No.	Make	1	2	3	4	5	6	7	8	9	10	ASNTC	Pts	Ref
2023	Rackley W.A.R.	99	Chevy	FIF	MAD	NWS; 5	HCY	MLW	AND	WIR	TOL	WIN	NSV	52nd	70	

=== Superstar Racing Experience ===
(key) * – Most laps led. ^{1} – Heat 1 winner. ^{2} – Heat 2 winner.

Superstar Racing Experience results
Year	No.	1	2	3	4	5	6	SRXC	Pts
2023	99	STA	STA; 2	MMS	BER	ELD	LOS	12th	0^{1}

Sporting positions
Preceded by Chris Buescher	NASCAR Xfinity Series Champion; 2016	Succeeded by William Byron

Achievements
Preceded by Ross Chastain	Coca-Cola 600 Winner; 2026	Succeeded by Incumbent
