= 2026 Freeway Insurance 500 =

NASCAR Cup Series race

Race details
- Race 33 of 36 in the 2026 NASCAR Cup Series
- Date: October 18, 2025
- Location: Phoenix Raceway in Avondale, Arizona
- Course: Permanent racing facility
- Course length: 1.000 miles (1.609 km)
- Distance: 312 laps, 312 mi (502.115 km)
- Average speed: 103.207 miles per hour (166.096 km/h)

Pole position
Driver	Ryan Blaney	Team Penske
- Time: 26.250

Most laps led
Driver	Christopher Bell	Joe Gibbs Racing
- Laps: 85

Fastest lap
Driver	Ryan Blaney	Team Penske
- Time: 27.101

Winner
No. 45	Tyler Reddick	23XI Racing

Television in the United States
- Network: USA
- Announcers: Leigh Diffey, Jeff Burton and Steve Letarte

Radio in the United States
- Radio: MRN
- Booth announcers: Alex Hayden, Mike Bagley, and Todd Gordon
- Turn announcers: Dan Hubbard (1 & 2) and Tim Catafalmo (3 & 4)

The 2026 Freeway Insurance 500 was a NASCAR Cup Series race held on October 18, 2026, at Phoenix Raceway in Avondale, Arizona. It was held over 312 laps on the 1.000 mi (1.609 km) oval, it was the 33rd race of the 2026 NASCAR Cup Series season, and the seventh race of the NASCAR Chase.

Tyler Reddick won the race. Ryan Blaney finished 2nd, and Chase Elliott finished 3rd. Christopher Bell and Corey Heim rounded out the top five, and Joey Logano, Daniel Suárez, Chase Briscoe, Ross Chastain, and Ty Gibbs rounded out the top ten.

== Report ==
=== Background ===
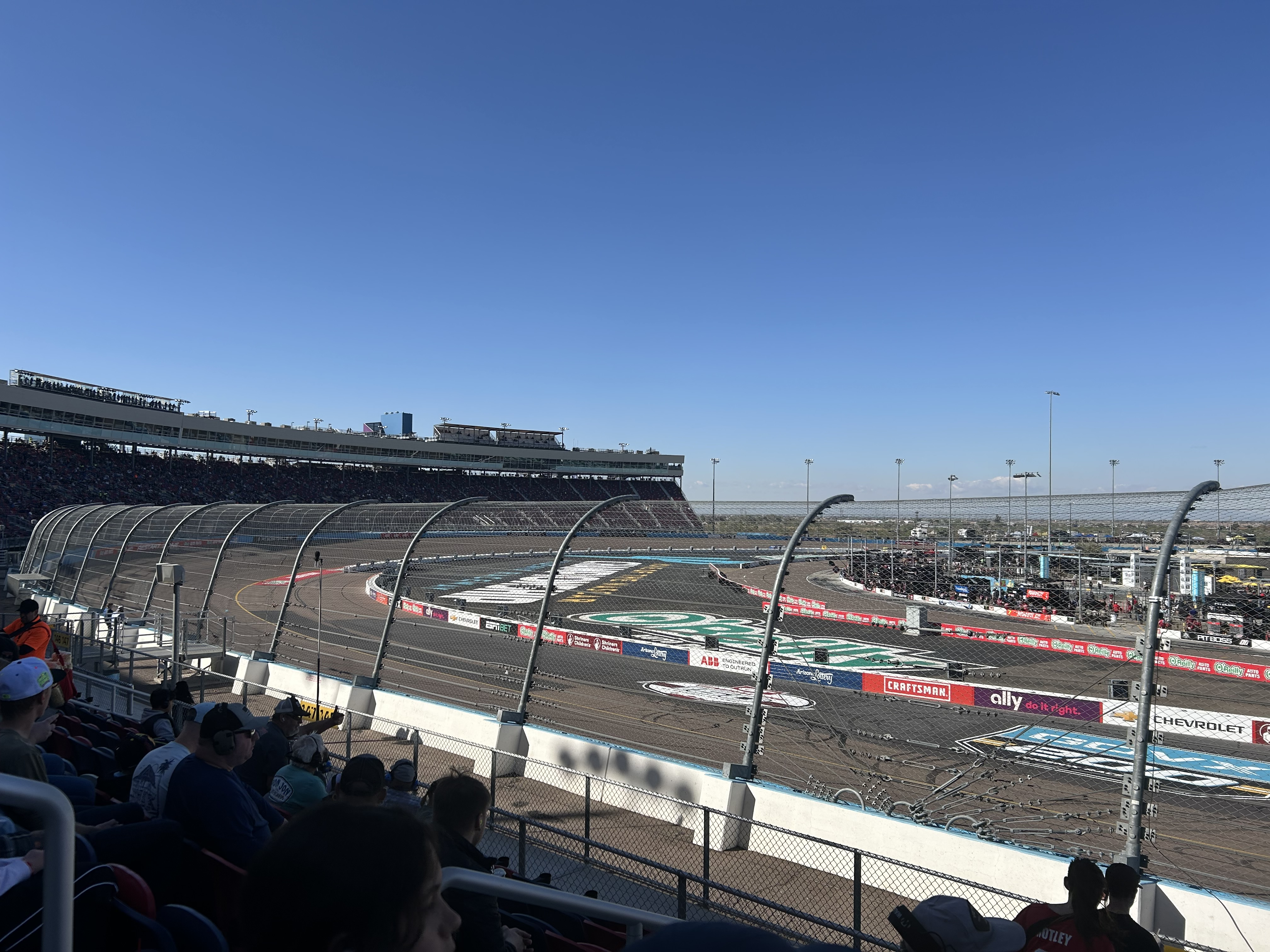
Phoenix Raceway, the track where the race was.

Phoenix Raceway is a 1-mile, low-banked tri-oval race track located in Avondale, Arizona, near Phoenix. The motorsport track opened in 1964 and currently hosts two NASCAR race weekends annually including the final championship race since 2020. Phoenix Raceway has also hosted the CART, IndyCar Series, USAC and the IMSA SportsCar Championship. The raceway is currently owned and operated by NASCAR.

Freeway Insurance was announced as the title sponsor.

==== Entry list ====
- (R) denotes rookie driver.
- (i) denotes driver who is ineligible for series driver points.
- (CC) denotes chase contender.

No.	Driver	Team	Manufacturer
1	Ross Chastain	Trackhouse Racing	Chevrolet
2	Austin Cindric (CC)	Team Penske	Ford
3	Austin Dillon	Richard Childress Racing	Chevrolet
4	Noah Gragson	Front Row Motorsports	Ford
5	Kyle Larson (CC)	Hendrick Motorsports	Chevrolet
6	Brad Keselowski	RFK Racing	Ford
7	Daniel Suárez (CC)	Spire Motorsports	Chevrolet
9	Chase Elliott (CC)	Hendrick Motorsports	Chevrolet
10	Ty Dillon	Kaulig Racing	Chevrolet
11	Denny Hamlin (CC)	Joe Gibbs Racing	Toyota
12	Ryan Blaney (CC)	Team Penske	Ford
16	A. J. Allmendinger	Kaulig Racing	Chevrolet
17	Chris Buescher (CC)	RFK Racing	Ford
19	Chase Briscoe (CC)	Joe Gibbs Racing	Toyota
20	Christopher Bell (CC)	Joe Gibbs Racing	Toyota
21	Josh Berry	Wood Brothers Racing	Ford
22	Joey Logano (CC)	Team Penske	Ford
23	Bubba Wallace (CC)	23XI Racing	Toyota
24	William Byron (CC)	Hendrick Motorsports	Chevrolet
33	Austin Hill (i)	Richard Childress Racing	Chevrolet
34	Todd Gilliland	Front Row Motorsports	Ford
35	Riley Herbst	23XI Racing	Toyota
38	Zane Smith	Front Row Motorsports	Ford
41	Cole Custer	Haas Factory Team	Chevrolet
42	John Hunter Nemechek	Legacy Motor Club	Toyota
43	Erik Jones	Legacy Motor Club	Toyota
45	Tyler Reddick (CC)	23XI Racing	Toyota
47	Ricky Stenhouse Jr.	Hyak Motorsports	Chevrolet
48	Alex Bowman	Hendrick Motorsports	Chevrolet
51	Cody Ware	Rick Ware Racing	Chevrolet
54	Ty Gibbs (CC)	Joe Gibbs Racing	Toyota
60	Ryan Preece (CC)	RFK Racing	Ford
67	Corey Heim (i)	23XI Racing	Toyota
71	Michael McDowell	Spire Motorsports	Chevrolet
77	Carson Hocevar (CC)	Spire Motorsports	Chevrolet
88	Connor Zilisch (R)	Trackhouse Racing	Chevrolet
97	Shane van Gisbergen	Trackhouse Racing	Chevrolet
Official entry list

== Practice ==
Ryan Blaney was the fastest in the practice session with a time of 26.969 seconds and a speed of 133.487 mph (214.827 km/h).

=== Practice results ===
Pos	No.	Driver	Team	Manufacturer	Time	Speed
1	12	Ryan Blaney (CC)	Team Penske	Ford	26.969	133.487
2	77	Carson Hocevar (CC)	Spire Motorsports	Chevrolet	26.998	133.343
3	22	Joey Logano (CC)	Team Penske	Ford	27.015	133.259
Official practice results

== Qualifying ==
Ryan Blaney scored the pole for the race with a time of 26.250 and a speed of 137.143 mph (220.710 km/h).

=== Qualifying results ===
Pos	No.	Driver	Team	Manufacturer	Time	Speed
1	12	Ryan Blaney (CC)	Team Penske	Ford	26.250	137.143
2	22	Joey Logano (CC)	Team Penske	Ford	26.282	136.976
3	19	Chase Briscoe (CC)	Joe Gibbs Racing	Toyota	26.311	136.825
4	11	Denny Hamlin (CC)	Joe Gibbs Racing	Toyota	26.314	136.809
5	20	Christopher Bell (CC)	Joe Gibbs Racing	Toyota	26.351	136.617
6	45	Tyler Reddick (CC)	23XI Racing	Toyota	26.398	136.374
7	54	Ty Gibbs (CC)	Joe Gibbs Racing	Toyota	26.414	136.291
8	71	Michael McDowell	Spire Motorsports	Chevrolet	26.432	136.199
9	21	Josh Berry	Wood Brothers Racing	Ford	26.443	136.142
10	24	William Byron (CC)	Hendrick Motorsports	Chevrolet	26.483	135.936
11	1	Ross Chastain	Trackhouse Racing	Chevrolet	26.513	135.782
12	88	Connor Zilisch (R)	Trackhouse Racing	Chevrolet	26.539	135.649
13	34	Todd Gilliland	Front Row Motorsports	Ford	26.600	135.338
14	7	Daniel Suárez (CC)	Spire Motorsports	Chevrolet	26.606	135.308
15	2	Austin Cindric (CC)	Team Penske	Ford	26.655	135.059
16	9	Chase Elliott (CC)	Hendrick Motorsports	Chevrolet	26.667	134.998
17	17	Chris Buescher (CC)	RFK Racing	Ford	26.678	134.943
18	6	Brad Keselowski	RFK Racing	Ford	26.680	134.933
19	35	Riley Herbst	23XI Racing	Toyota	26.746	134.600
20	38	Zane Smith	Front Row Motorsports	Ford	26.752	134.569
21	16	A. J. Allmendinger	Kaulig Racing	Chevrolet	26.761	134.524
22	5	Kyle Larson (CC)	Hendrick Motorsports	Chevrolet	26.769	134.484
23	23	Bubba Wallace (CC)	23XI Racing	Toyota	26.782	134.419
24	3	Austin Dillon	Richard Childress Racing	Chevrolet	26.782	134.419
25	97	Shane van Gisbergen	Trackhouse Racing	Chevrolet	26.798	134.338
26	60	Ryan Preece (CC)	RFK Racing	Ford	26.799	134.333
27	41	Cole Custer	Haas Factory Team	Chevrolet	26.815	134.253
28	77	Carson Hocevar (CC)	Spire Motorsports	Chevrolet	26.821	134.223
29	43	Erik Jones	Legacy Motor Club	Toyota	26.827	134.193
30	4	Noah Gragson	Front Row Motorsports	Ford	26.842	134.118
31	47	Ricky Stenhouse Jr.	Hyak Motorsports	Chevrolet	26.917	133.744
32	42	John Hunter Nemechek	Legacy Motor Club	Toyota	26.943	133.615
33	10	Ty Dillon	Kaulig Racing	Chevrolet	26.957	133.546
34	48	Alex Bowman	Hendrick Motorsports	Chevrolet	26.986	133.403
35	33	Austin Hill (i)	Richard Childress Racing	Chevrolet	26.990	133.383
36	67	Corey Heim (i)	23XI Racing	Toyota	27.002	133.323
37	51	Cody Ware	Rick Ware Racing	Chevrolet	27.075	132.964
Official qualifying results

== Race ==
=== Race results ===
==== Stage Results ====
Stage One Laps: 60

Pos	No	Driver	Team	Manufacturer	Points
1	22	Joey Logano (CC)	Team Penske	Ford	10
2	11	Denny Hamlin (CC)	Joe Gibbs Racing	Toyota	9
3	20	Christopher Bell (CC)	Joe Gibbs Racing	Toyota	8
4	12	Ryan Blaney (CC)	Team Penske	Ford	7
5	19	Chase Briscoe (CC)	Joe Gibbs Racing	Toyota	6
6	24	William Byron (CC)	Hendrick Motorsports	Chevrolet	5
7	9	Chase Elliott (CC)	Hendrick Motorsports	Chevrolet	4
8	1	Ross Chastain	Trackhouse Racing	Chevrolet	3
9	45	Tyler Reddick (CC)	23XI Racing	Toyota	2
10	21	Josh Berry	Wood Brothers Racing	Ford	1

Stage Two Laps: 125

Pos	No	Driver	Team	Manufacturer	Points
1	22	Joey Logano (CC)	Team Penske	Ford	10
2	19	Chase Briscoe (CC)	Joe Gibbs Racing	Toyota	9
3	20	Christopher Bell (CC)	Joe Gibbs Racing	Toyota	8
4	21	Josh Berry	Wood Brothers Racing	Ford	7
5	23	Bubba Wallace (CC)	23XI Racing	Toyota	6
6	12	Ryan Blaney (CC)	Team Penske	Ford	5
7	45	Tyler Reddick (CC)	23XI Racing	Toyota	4
8	11	Denny Hamlin (CC)	Joe Gibbs Racing	Toyota	3
9	34	Todd Gilliland	Front Row Motorsports	Ford	2
10	9	Chase Elliott (CC)	Hendrick Motorsports	Chevrolet	1

=== Final Stage Results ===
Stage Three Laps: 127

Pos	Grid	No	Driver	Team	Manufacturer	Laps	Points
1	6	45	Tyler Reddick (CC)	23XI Racing	Toyota	312	61
2	1	12	Ryan Blaney (CC)	Team Penske	Ford	312	48
3	16	9	Chase Elliott (CC)	Hendrick Motorsports	Chevrolet	312	39
4	5	20	Christopher Bell (CC)	Joe Gibbs Racing	Toyota	312	49
5	36	67	Corey Heim (i)	23XI Racing	Toyota	312	0
6	2	22	Joey Logano (CC)	Team Penske	Ford	312	51
7	14	7	Daniel Suárez (CC)	Spire Motorsports	Chevrolet	312	30
8	3	19	Chase Briscoe (CC)	Joe Gibbs Racing	Toyota	312	44
9	11	1	Ross Chastain	Trackhouse Racing	Chevrolet	312	31
10	7	54	Ty Gibbs (CC)	Joe Gibbs Racing	Toyota	312	27
11	9	21	Josh Berry	Wood Brothers Racing	Ford	312	34
12	28	77	Carson Hocevar (CC)	Spire Motorsports	Chevrolet	312	25
13	30	4	Noah Gragson	Front Row Motorsports	Ford	312	24
14	13	34	Todd Gilliland	Front Row Motorsports	Ford	312	25
15	20	38	Zane Smith	Front Row Motorsports	Ford	312	22
16	18	6	Brad Keselowski	RFK Racing	Ford	312	21
17	23	23	Bubba Wallace (CC)	23XI Racing	Toyota	312	26
18	26	60	Ryan Preece (CC)	RFK Racing	Ford	312	19
19	15	2	Austin Cindric (CC)	Team Penske	Ford	312	18
20	12	88	Connor Zilisch (R)	Trackhouse Racing	Chevrolet	312	17
21	10	24	William Byron (CC)	Hendrick Motorsports	Chevrolet	312	21
22	17	17	Chris Buescher (CC)	RFK Racing	Ford	312	15
23	21	16	A. J. Allmendinger	Kaulig Racing	Chevrolet	312	14
24	35	33	Austin Hill (i)	Richard Childress Racing	Chevrolet	312	0
25	29	43	Erik Jones	Legacy Motor Club	Toyota	312	12
26	25	97	Shane van Gisbergen	Trackhouse Racing	Chevrolet	312	11
27	27	41	Cole Custer	Haas Factory Team	Chevrolet	312	10
28	4	11	Denny Hamlin (CC)	Joe Gibbs Racing	Toyota	311	21
29	34	48	Alex Bowman	Hendrick Motorsports	Chevrolet	311	8
30	31	47	Ricky Stenhouse Jr.	Hyak Motorsports	Chevrolet	311	7
31	33	10	Ty Dillon	Kaulig Racing	Chevrolet	310	6
32	19	35	Riley Herbst	23XI Racing	Toyota	308	5
33	32	42	John Hunter Nemechek	Legacy Motor Club	Toyota	307	4
34	22	5	Kyle Larson (CC)	Hendrick Motorsports	Chevrolet	281	3
35	37	51	Cody Ware	Rick Ware Racing	Chevrolet	220	2
36	8	71	Michael McDowell	Spire Motorsports	Chevrolet	201	1
37	24	3	Austin Dillon	Richard Childress Racing	Chevrolet	155	1
Official race results

=== Race statistics ===
- Lead changes: 21 among 10 different drivers
- Cautions/Laps: 6 for 43
- Red flags: 0
- Time of race: 3 hours, 1 minute and 23 seconds
- Average speed: 103.207 miles per hour (166.096 km/h)

== Media ==
=== Television ===
USA Sports covered the race on the television side. Leigh Diffey, Jeff Burton and Steve Letarte called the race from the broadcast booth. Dave Burns, Kim Coon, and Marty Snider handled pit road, while Trevor Bayne provided analysis from the pace car for the television side.

USA
Booth announcers	Pit reporters	Pace car
Lap-by-lap: Leigh Diffey; Color-commentator: Jeff Burton; Color-commentator: Steve Letarte	Dave Burns; Kim Coon; Marty Snider	Trevor Bayne

=== Radio ===
MRN covered the radio action for the race which was also simulcasted on Sirius XM NASCAR Radio. Alex Hayden, Mike Bagley, and former crew chief Todd Gordon called the race when the field races past the start/finish line. Dan Hubbard called the action from turns 1 & 2, and Tim Catafalmo called the action from turns 3 & 4. Pit lane was manned by Lead MRN Pit Reporter Steve Post, Chris Wilner, and Jacklyn Drake.

MRN
Booth announcers	Turn announcers	Pit reporters
Lead announcer: Alex Hayden; Announcer: Mike Bagley; Announcer: Todd Gordon	Turns 1 & 2: Dan Hubbard; Turns 3 & 4: Tim Catafalmo	Steve Post; Chris Wilner; Jacklyn Drake

== Standings after the race ==
Drivers' Championship standings

	Pos	Driver	Points
	1	Kyle Larson	2,370
1	2	Christopher Bell	2,365 (–5)
1	3	Chase Briscoe	2,346 (–24)
2	4	Denny Hamlin	2,339 (–31)
	5	Ryan Blaney	2,330 (–40)
	6	Joey Logano	2,326 (–44)
	7	Tyler Reddick	2,314 (–56)
	8	Austin Cindric	2,240 (–130)
	9	Ty Gibbs	2,238 (–132)
2	10	Chase Elliott	2,221 (–149)
1	11	Carson Hocevar	2,212 (–158)
1	12	Bubba Wallace	2,208 (–162)
1	13	Daniel Suárez	2,182 (–188)
1	14	William Byron	2,180 (–190)
	15	Chris Buescher	2,166 (–204)
	16	Ryan Preece	2,159 (–211)
Official driver's standings

Manufacturers' Championship standings

Pos	Manufacturer	Points
1	Toyota	1,489
2	Chevrolet	1,272 (–217)
3	Ford	1,224 (–265)

- Note: Only the first 16 positions are included for the driver standings.

Previous race: 2026 Bank of America 400	NASCAR Cup Series; 2026 season	Next race: 2026 YellaWood 500
