= NASCAR Cup Series at Phoenix Raceway =

NASCAR Cup Series race at Phoenix Raceway

NASCAR Cup Series
- Venue: Phoenix Raceway
- Location: Avondale, Arizona, United States

Circuit information
- Surface: Asphalt
- Length: 1 mi (1.6 km)
- Turns: 4

Stock car racing events in the NASCAR Cup Series have been held annually at the Phoenix Raceway in Avondale, Arizona, since 1988.

Both races are 312 laps and 312 miles (502.115 km) each. Phoenix received a second date beginning in 2005 part of a NASCAR schedule realignment. It is one of the many NASCAR races run with a length measured in kilometers.

== Spring race ==
Straight Talk Wireless 500
- Corporate sponsor: Straight Talk Wireless
- First race: 2005
- Distance: 312 mi (502.115 km)
- Laps: 312; Stage 1: 60; Stage 2: 125; Final stage: 127
- Previous names: Subway Fresh 500 (2005–2006); Subway Fresh Fit 500 (2007–2009, 2011–2013); Subway Fresh Fit 600 (2010); The Profit on CNBC 500 (2014); CampingWorld.com 500 (2015); Good Sam 500 (2016); Camping World 500 (2017); TicketGuardian 500 (2018–2019); FanShield 500 (2020); Instacart 500 (2021); Ruoff Mortgage 500 (2022); United Rentals Work United 500 (2023); Shriners Children's 500 (2024–2025)
- Most wins (driver): Kevin Harvick (5)
- Most wins (team): Stewart–Haas Racing (6)
- Most wins (manufacturer): Chevrolet (12)

The Straight Talk Wireless 500 is a NASCAR Cup Series race held at Phoenix Raceway in Avondale, Arizona. Ryan Blaney is the defending race winner, having won the event in 2026.

=== History ===
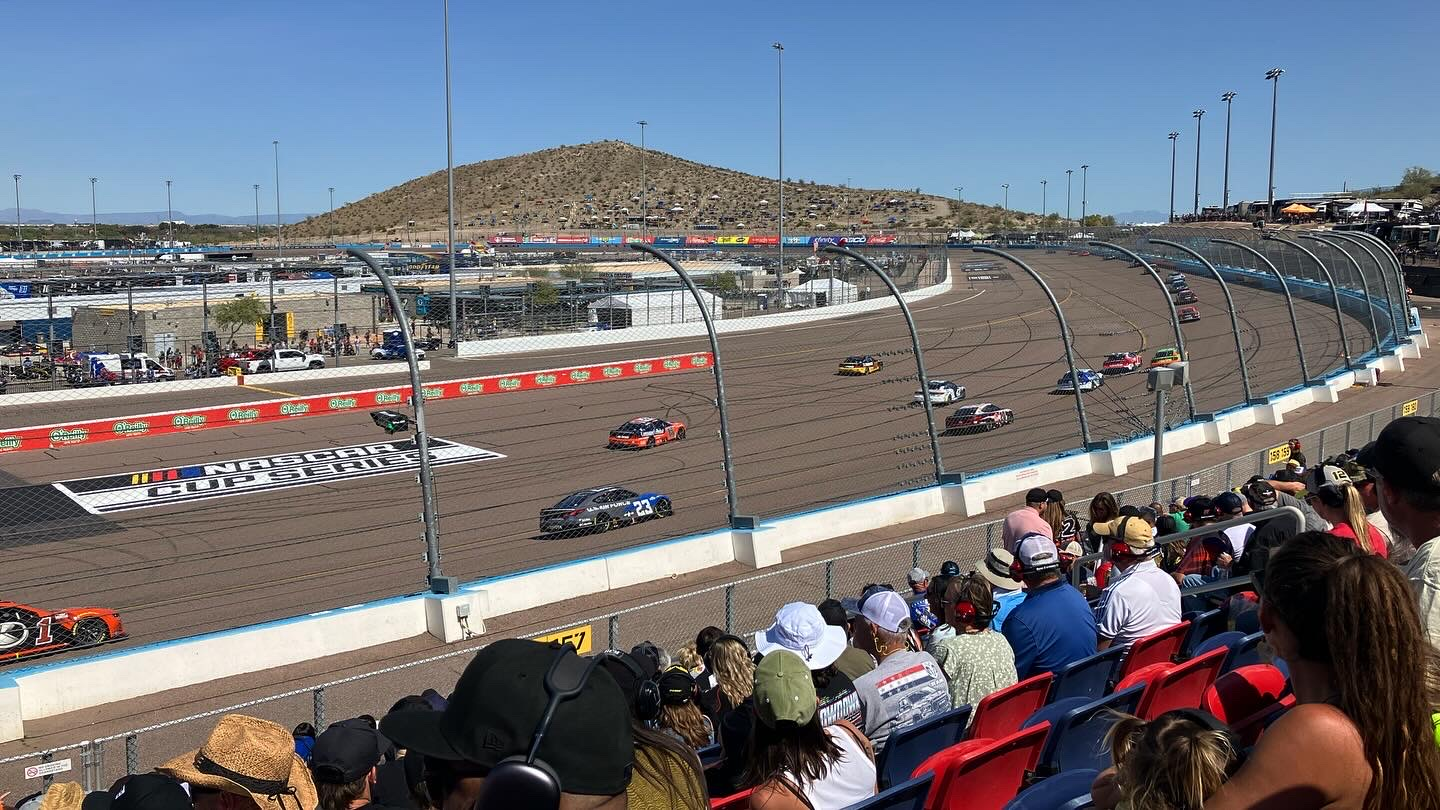
The 2024 Shriners Children's 500 at Phoenix Raceway

As part of the 2005 schedule changes, a second date was awarded to what was then Phoenix International Raceway in the spring. Subway would be the title sponsor of the new race, with the name being the "Subway Fresh 500". Subway later added the word "Fit" to the sponsorship to promote its Fresh Fit combo choices.

With the new 2010 NASCAR start time rule change that starts races only at 1:00 pm, 3:00 pm, and 7:30 pm Eastern Time, track officials were concerned that the new start time (45 minutes earlier than in the past) would put the majority of the race in the day instead of the planned night. At that time of year in Phoenix, sunset takes place at roughly 7:00 pm MST (because Arizona does not observe daylight saving time, this is the same as Pacific Daylight Time). As a result, the race was stretched to 600 km (372.8 mi) so that the extra 100 km (62.1 mi) would take place during the day, and most of the race would still take place at night as planned.

The race saw three changes in 2011. After only one year as a 600 km race, the race returned to 500 km and 312 laps that year, it was moved from Saturday to Sunday, it was run entirely during the daytime for the first time, and it became the second race of the Cup Series season, replacing the race at Auto Club Speedway.

In 2015, this race became the fourth race of the season, replacing the Food City 500 at Bristol Motor Speedway which was moved from March to April due to bad weather plaguing the spring Bristol race for numerous years. This move allowed for the creation of a three-race west coast swing with the Phoenix race now being between the races at Las Vegas and Fontana, providing cost efficiencies to the teams. (The race at Atlanta became the second race of the season in 2015, replacing Phoenix.)

In 2023, United Rentals became the title sponsor of the race, replacing Ruoff Mortgage. In 2024, Shriners Hospitals for Children replaced United Rentals as the race's title sponsor. In 2026, the race was sponsored by Straight Talk Wireless.

=== Past winners ===
Year	Date	No.	Driver	Team	Manufacturer	Race Distance		Race Time	Average Speed (mph)	Report	Ref
Year	Date	No.	Driver	Team	Manufacturer	Laps	Miles (km)	Race Time	Average Speed (mph)	Report	Ref
2005	April 23	97	Kurt Busch	Roush Racing	Ford	312	312 (502.115)	3:02:16	102.707	Report	
2006	April 22	29	Kevin Harvick	Richard Childress Racing	Chevrolet	312	312 (502.115)	2:54:51	107.063	Report	
2007	April 21	24	Jeff Gordon	Hendrick Motorsports	Chevrolet	312	312 (502.115)	2:53:48	107.71	Report	
2008	April 12	48	Jimmie Johnson	Hendrick Motorsports	Chevrolet	312	312 (502.115)	3:01:14	103.292	Report	
2009	April 18	5	Mark Martin	Hendrick Motorsports	Chevrolet	312	312 (502.115)	2:53:16	108.042	Report	
2010	April 10	39	Ryan Newman	Stewart–Haas Racing	Chevrolet	378*	378 (608.332)	3:48:14	99.372	Report	
2011	February 27	24	Jeff Gordon	Hendrick Motorsports	Chevrolet	312	312 (502.115)	3:01:49	102.961	Report	
2012	March 4	11	Denny Hamlin	Joe Gibbs Racing	Toyota	312	312 (502.115)	2:50:35	110.085	Report	
2013	March 3	99	Carl Edwards	Roush Fenway Racing	Ford	316*	316 (508.553)	3:00:15	105.187	Report	
2014	March 2	4	Kevin Harvick	Stewart–Haas Racing	Chevrolet	312	312 (502.115)	2:51:23	109.229	Report	
2015	March 15	4	Kevin Harvick	Stewart–Haas Racing	Chevrolet	312	312 (502.115)	2:57:01	105.753	Report	
2016	March 13	4	Kevin Harvick	Stewart–Haas Racing	Chevrolet	313*	313 (503.724)	2:45:53	113.212	Report	
2017	March 19	31	Ryan Newman	Richard Childress Racing	Chevrolet	314*	314 (505.334)	3:00:41	104.271	Report	
2018	March 11	4	Kevin Harvick	Stewart–Haas Racing	Ford	312	312 (502.115)	2:53:13	108.073	Report	
2019	March 10	18	Kyle Busch	Joe Gibbs Racing	Toyota	312	312 (502.115)	3:04:05	101.693	Report	
2020	March 8	22	Joey Logano	Team Penske	Ford	316*	316 (519.742)	3:20:50	94.407	Report	
2021	March 14	19	Martin Truex Jr.	Joe Gibbs Racing	Toyota	312	312 (502.115)	3:00:20	103.808	Report	
2022	March 13	14	Chase Briscoe	Stewart–Haas Racing	Ford	312	312 (502.115)	3:06:34	100.339	Report	
2023	March 12	24	William Byron	Hendrick Motorsports	Chevrolet	317*	317 (510.161)	3:00:18	105.491	Report	
2024	March 10	20	Christopher Bell	Joe Gibbs Racing	Toyota	312	312 (502.115)	3:00:45	103.568	Report	
2025	March 9	20	Christopher Bell	Joe Gibbs Racing	Toyota	312	312 (502.115)	3:23:10	92.141	Report	
2026	March 8	12	Ryan Blaney	Team Penske	Ford	312	312 (502.115)	3:32:12	88.219	Report	
2027	March 14									Report	

- 2010, 2013, 2016–2017, 2020, and 2023: Race extended due to NASCAR overtime.

==== Multiple winners (drivers) ====
# wins	Driver	Years won
5	Kevin Harvick	2006, 2014–2016, 2018
2	Jeff Gordon	2007, 2011
2	Ryan Newman	2010, 2017
2	Christopher Bell	2024, 2025

==== Multiple winners (teams) ====
# wins	Team	Years won
6	Stewart–Haas Racing	2010, 2014–2016, 2018, 2022
5	Hendrick Motorsports	2007–2009, 2011, 2023
5	Joe Gibbs Racing	2012, 2019, 2021, 2024, 2025
2	Roush Fenway Racing	2005, 2013
2	Richard Childress Racing	2006, 2017
2	Team Penske	2020, 2026

==== Manufacturer wins ====
# wins	Manufacturer	Years won
11	Chevrolet	2006–2011, 2014–2017, 2023
6	Ford	2005, 2013, 2018, 2020, 2022, 2026
5	Toyota	2012, 2019, 2021, 2024, 2025

== Fall race ==
Freeway Insurance 500
- Corporate sponsor: Freeway Insurance
- First race: 1988
- Distance: 312 mi (502.115 km)
- Laps: 312; Stage 1: 60; Stage 2: 125; Final stage: 127
- Previous names: Checker 500 (1988, 1990); Autoworks 500 (1989); Pyroil 500 (1991); Pyroil 500K (1992); Slick 50 500 (1993–1994); Dura Lube 500 (1995–1996); Dura Lube 500 Presented by Kmart (1997); Dura Lube/Kmart 500 (1998); Checker Auto Parts/Dura Lube 500 (1999–2000); Checker Auto Parts 500 Presented by Pennzoil (2001–2002, 2006–2007); Checker Auto Parts 500 Presented by Havoline (2003); Checker Auto Parts 500 (2004–2005); Checker O'Reilly Auto Parts 500 Presented by Pennzoil (2008); Checker O'Reilly Auto Parts 500 (2009); Kobalt Tools 500 (2010–2011); AdvoCare 500 (2012–2013); Quicken Loans Race for Heroes 500 (2014–2015); Can-Am 500 (2016–2018); Bluegreen Vacations 500 (2019); Season Finale 500 (2020); NASCAR Cup Series Championship Race (2021–2025)
- Most wins (driver): Kevin Harvick (4)
- Most wins (team): Hendrick Motorsports (8)
- Most wins (manufacturer): Chevrolet, Ford (16)

The Freeway Insurance 500 is a NASCAR Cup Series race held at Phoenix Raceway in Avondale, Arizona. Tyler Reddick is the defending race winner, having won the event in 2026.

=== History ===
The race first began in 1988, with Alan Kulwicki winning the race. It was typically the third to last or penultimate race of the NASCAR Cup Series season.

From 2020 to 2025, the race was known as the season finale, as the date moved from Homestead–Miami Speedway in 2020.

In 2026, the championship was moved back to Homestead–Miami, resulting in Phoenix retaining their fall event. Freeway Insurance was announced as the title sponsor, after the announcement of Freeway becoming a Premier Partner in the Cup Series.

=== Past winners ===
Year	Date	No.	Driver	Team	Manufacturer	Race Distance		Race Time	Average Speed (mph)	Report	Ref
Year	Date	No.	Driver	Team	Manufacturer	Laps	Miles (km)	Race Time	Average Speed (mph)	Report	Ref
1988	November 6	7	Alan Kulwicki	AK Racing	Ford	312	312 (502.115)	3:26:57	90.457	Report	
1989	November 5	9	Bill Elliott	Melling Racing	Ford	312	312 (502.115)	2:57:08	105.683	Report	
1990	November 4	3	Dale Earnhardt	Richard Childress Racing	Chevrolet	312	312 (502.115)	3:13:25	96.786	Report	
1991	November 3	28	Davey Allison	Robert Yates Racing	Ford	312	312 (502.115)	3:15:31	95.746	Report	
1992	November 1	28	Davey Allison	Robert Yates Racing	Ford	312	312 (502.115)	3:00:12	103.885	Report	
1993	October 31	6	Mark Martin	Roush Racing	Ford	312	312 (502.115)	3:06:30	100.375	Report	
1994	October 30	5	Terry Labonte	Hendrick Motorsports	Chevrolet	312	312 (502.115)	2:54:12	107.463	Report	
1995	October 29	10	Ricky Rudd	Rudd Performance Motorsports	Ford	312	312 (502.115)	3:03:18	102.128	Report	
1996	October 27	43	Bobby Hamilton	Petty Enterprises	Pontiac	312	312 (502.115)	2:50:38	109.709	Report	
1997	November 2	88	Dale Jarrett	Robert Yates Racing	Ford	312	312 (502.115)	2:48:55	110.824	Report	
1998	October 25	2	Rusty Wallace	Penske Racing	Ford	257*	257 (413.601)	2:22:30	108.211	Report	
1999	November 7	20	Tony Stewart	Joe Gibbs Racing	Pontiac	312	312 (502.115)	2:38:28	118.132	Report	
2000	November 5	99	Jeff Burton	Roush Racing	Ford	312	312 (502.115)	2:58:13	105.041	Report	
2001	October 28	99	Jeff Burton	Roush Racing	Ford	312	312 (502.115)	3:02:26	102.613	Report	
2002	November 10	17	Matt Kenseth	Roush Racing	Ford	312	312 (502.115)	2:44:25	113.857	Report	
2003	November 2	8	Dale Earnhardt Jr.	Dale Earnhardt, Inc.	Chevrolet	312	312 (502.115)	3:19:11	93.984	Report	
2004	November 7	8	Dale Earnhardt Jr.	Dale Earnhardt, Inc.	Chevrolet	315*	315 (506.943)	3:19:16	94.848	Report	
2005	November 13	5	Kyle Busch	Hendrick Motorsports	Chevrolet	312	312 (502.115)	3:02:23	102.641	Report	
2006	November 12	29	Kevin Harvick	Richard Childress Racing	Chevrolet	312	312 (502.115)	3:14:44	96.131	Report	
2007	November 11	48	Jimmie Johnson	Hendrick Motorsports	Chevrolet	312	312 (502.115)	3:01:46	102.989	Report	
2008	November 9	48	Jimmie Johnson	Hendrick Motorsports	Chevrolet	313*	313 (503.724)	3:12:01	97.804	Report	
2009	November 15	48	Jimmie Johnson	Hendrick Motorsports	Chevrolet	312	312 (502.115)	2:49:26	110.486	Report	
2010	November 14	99	Carl Edwards	Roush Fenway Racing	Ford	312	312 (502.115)	2:49:01	110.754	Report	
2011	November 13	4	Kasey Kahne	Red Bull Racing Team	Toyota	312	312 (502.115)	2:45:47	112.918	Report	
2012	November 11	29	Kevin Harvick	Richard Childress Racing	Chevrolet	319*	319 (513.381)	2:52:09	111.182	Report	
2013	November 10	29	Kevin Harvick	Richard Childress Racing	Chevrolet	312	312 (502.115)	2:57:03	105.733	Report	
2014	November 9	4	Kevin Harvick	Stewart–Haas Racing	Chevrolet	312	312 (502.115)	3:07:13	99.991	Report	
2015	November 15	88	Dale Earnhardt Jr.	Hendrick Motorsports	Chevrolet	219*	219 (352.446)	2:03:22	106.512	Report	
2016	November 13	22	Joey Logano	Team Penske	Ford	324*	324 (521.427)	3:08:59	102.866	Report	
2017	November 12	20	Matt Kenseth	Joe Gibbs Racing	Toyota	312	312 (502.115)	2:57:23	105.534	Report	
2018	November 11	18	Kyle Busch	Joe Gibbs Racing	Toyota	312	312 (502.115)	3:10:20	98.354	Report	
2019	November 10	11	Denny Hamlin	Joe Gibbs Racing	Toyota	312	312 (502.115)	2:48:00	111.429	Report	
2020	November 8	9	Chase Elliott	Hendrick Motorsports	Chevrolet	312	312 (502.115)	2:47:00	112.096	Report	
2021	November 7	5	Kyle Larson	Hendrick Motorsports	Chevrolet	312	312 (502.115)	3:06:33	100.348	Report	
2022	November 6	22	Joey Logano	Team Penske	Ford	312	312 (502.115)	2:58:42	104.757	Report	
2023	November 5	1	Ross Chastain	Trackhouse Racing	Chevrolet	312	312 (502.115)	2:52:01	108.827	Report	
2024	November 10	22	Joey Logano	Team Penske	Ford	312	312 (502.115)	2:56:16	106.203	Report	
2025	November 2	12	Ryan Blaney	Team Penske	Ford	319*	319 (513.38)	3:15:53	97.711	Report	
2026	October 18	45	Tyler Reddick	23XI Racing	Toyota	312	312 (502.115)	3:01:23	103.207	Report	
2027	October 24									Report	

=== Notes ===
- 2020–2025: Races were held as the NASCAR Cup Series Championship Race.
- 1998 & 2015: Race shortened due to rain.
- 2004, 2008, 2012, 2016, & 2025: Race extended due to NASCAR overtime.

==== Multiple winners (drivers) ====
# wins	Driver	Years won
4	Kevin Harvick	2006, 2012–2014
3	Jimmie Johnson	2007–2009
3	Dale Earnhardt Jr.	2003, 2004, 2015
3	Joey Logano	2016, 2022, 2024
2	Davey Allison	1991, 1992
2	Jeff Burton	2000, 2001
2	Matt Kenseth	2002, 2017
2	Kyle Busch	2005, 2018

==== Multiple winners (teams) ====
# wins	Team	Years won
8	Hendrick Motorsports	1994, 2005, 2007–2009, 2015, 2020, 2021
5	Roush Fenway Racing	1993, 2000–2002, 2010
5	Team Penske	1998, 2016, 2022, 2024, 2025
4	Richard Childress Racing	1990, 2006, 2012, 2013
4	Joe Gibbs Racing	1999, 2017–2019
3	Robert Yates Racing	1991, 1992, 1997
2	Dale Earnhardt, Inc.	2003, 2004

==== Manufacturer wins ====
# wins	Manufacturer	Years won
16	Chevrolet	1990, 1994, 2003–2009, 2012–2015, 2020, 2021, 2023
16	Ford	1988, 1989, 1991–1993, 1995, 1997, 1998, 2000–2002, 2010, 2016, 2022, 2024, 2025
5	Toyota	2011, 2017–2019, 2026
2	Pontiac	1996, 1999

Previous race: DuraMAX Grand Prix	NASCAR Cup Series; Straight Talk Wireless 500	Next race: Pennzoil 400

Previous race: Bank of America 400	NASCAR Cup Series; Freeway Insurance 500	Next race: YellaWood 500
