= 2026 YellaWood 500 =

NASCAR Cup Series race

Race details
- Race 34 of 36 in the 2026 NASCAR Cup Series
- Date: October 25, 2026
- Location: Talladega Superspeedway in Lincoln, Alabama
- Course: Permanent racing facility
- Course length: 2.66 miles (4.28 km)
- Distance: 189 laps, 502.74 mi (809.08 km)
- Scheduled distance: 188 laps, 500.08 mi (804.64 km)
- Average speed: 160.534 miles per hour (258.354 km/h)

Pole position
Driver	Chase Briscoe	Joe Gibbs Racing
- Time: 51.466

Most laps led
Driver	Chris Buescher	RFK Racing
- Laps: 53

Fastest lap
Driver	Chase Elliott	Hendrick Motorsports
- Time: 47.546

Winner
No. 5	Kyle Larson	Hendrick Motorsports

Television in the United States
- Network: NBC
- Announcers: Leigh Diffey, Jeff Burton and Steve Letarte

Radio in the United States
- Radio: MRN
- Booth announcers: Alex Hayden, Mike Bagley, and Todd Gordon
- Turn announcers: Dave Moody (1 & 2), Kyle Rickey (Backstretch), and Tim Catafalmo (3 & 4)

The 2026 YellaWood 500 was a NASCAR Cup Series race held on October 25, 2026, at Talladega Superspeedway in Lincoln, Alabama. Contested over 189 laps on the 2.66 mile (4.28 km) superspeedway, extended from the original 188 laps due to an overtime finish, it was the 34th race of the 2026 NASCAR Cup Series season, and eighth race of The Chase.

Kyle Larson won the race. William Byron finished 2nd, and Ricky Stenhouse Jr. finished 3rd. Ross Chastain and Cole Custer rounded out the top five, and Carson Hocevar, Todd Gilliland, Denny Hamlin, Alex Bowman, and Michael McDowell rounded out the top ten.

== Report ==
=== Background ===
Talladega Superspeedway, the track where the race will be held.

Talladega Superspeedway, formerly known as Alabama International Motor Speedway, is a motorsports complex located north of Talladega, Alabama. It is located on the former Anniston Air Force Base in the small city of Lincoln. A tri-oval, the track was constructed in 1969 by the International Speedway Corporation, a business controlled by the France family. Talladega is most known for its steep banking. The track currently hosts NASCAR's Cup Series, O'Reilly Auto Parts Series and Craftsman Truck Series. Talladega is the longest NASCAR oval with a length of 2.66-mile-long (4.28 km) tri-oval like the Daytona International Speedway, which is 2.5-mile-long (4.0 km).

==== Entry list ====
- (R) denotes rookie driver.
- (i) denotes driver who is ineligible for series driver points.
- (CC) denotes chase contender.

No.	Driver	Team	Manufacturer
1	Ross Chastain	Trackhouse Racing	Chevrolet
2	Austin Cindric (CC)	Team Penske	Ford
3	Austin Dillon	Richard Childress Racing	Chevrolet
4	Noah Gragson	Front Row Motorsports	Ford
5	Kyle Larson (CC)	Hendrick Motorsports	Chevrolet
6	Brad Keselowski	RFK Racing	Ford
7	Daniel Suárez (CC)	Spire Motorsports	Chevrolet
9	Chase Elliott (CC)	Hendrick Motorsports	Chevrolet
10	Ty Dillon	Kaulig Racing	Chevrolet
11	Denny Hamlin (CC)	Joe Gibbs Racing	Toyota
12	Ryan Blaney (CC)	Team Penske	Ford
16	A. J. Allmendinger	Kaulig Racing	Chevrolet
17	Chris Buescher (CC)	RFK Racing	Ford
19	Chase Briscoe (CC)	Joe Gibbs Racing	Toyota
20	Christopher Bell (CC)	Joe Gibbs Racing	Toyota
21	Josh Berry	Wood Brothers Racing	Ford
22	Joey Logano (CC)	Team Penske	Ford
23	Bubba Wallace (CC)	23XI Racing	Toyota
24	William Byron (CC)	Hendrick Motorsports	Chevrolet
33	Austin Hill (i)	Richard Childress Racing	Chevrolet
34	Todd Gilliland	Front Row Motorsports	Ford
35	Riley Herbst	23XI Racing	Toyota
38	Zane Smith	Front Row Motorsports	Ford
41	Cole Custer	Haas Factory Team	Chevrolet
42	John Hunter Nemechek	Legacy Motor Club	Toyota
43	Erik Jones	Legacy Motor Club	Toyota
44	Joey Gase (i)	NY Racing Team	Chevrolet
45	Tyler Reddick (CC)	23XI Racing	Toyota
47	Ricky Stenhouse Jr.	Hyak Motorsports	Chevrolet
48	Alex Bowman	Hendrick Motorsports	Chevrolet
51	Cody Ware	Rick Ware Racing	Chevrolet
54	Ty Gibbs (CC)	Joe Gibbs Racing	Toyota
60	Ryan Preece (CC)	RFK Racing	Ford
62	Casey Mears	Beard Motorsports	Chevrolet
66	Gray Gaulding (i)	MBM Motorsports	Ford
71	Michael McDowell	Spire Motorsports	Chevrolet
77	Carson Hocevar (CC)	Spire Motorsports	Chevrolet
78	Daniel Dye (i)	Live Fast Motorsports	Chevrolet
88	Connor Zilisch (R)	Trackhouse Racing	Chevrolet
97	Shane van Gisbergen	Trackhouse Racing	Chevrolet
Official entry list

== Qualifying ==
Chase Briscoe scored the pole for the race with a time of 51.466 and a speed of 186.065 mph (299.443 km/h).

=== Qualifying results ===
Pos	No.	Driver	Team	Manufacturer	R1	R2
1	19	Chase Briscoe (CC)	Joe Gibbs Racing	Toyota	51.471	51.466
2	33	Austin Hill (i)	Richard Childress Racing	Chevrolet	51.776	51.498
3	88	Connor Zilisch (R)	Trackhouse Racing	Chevrolet	51.631	51.518
4	97	Shane van Gisbergen	Trackhouse Racing	Chevrolet	51.657	51.565
5	17	Chris Buescher (CC)	RFK Racing	Ford	51.646	51.593
6	20	Christopher Bell (CC)	Joe Gibbs Racing	Toyota	51.722	51.609
7	48	Alex Bowman	Hendrick Motorsports	Chevrolet	51.658	51.621
8	54	Ty Gibbs (CC)	Joe Gibbs Racing	Toyota	51.785	51.678
9	11	Denny Hamlin (CC)	Joe Gibbs Racing	Toyota	51.648	51.734
10	5	Kyle Larson (CC)	Hendrick Motorsports	Chevrolet	51.767	51.812
11	51	Cody Ware	Rick Ware Racing	Chevrolet	51.802	—
12	3	Austin Dillon	Richard Childress Racing	Chevrolet	51.805	—
13	7	Daniel Suárez (CC)	Spire Motorsports	Chevrolet	51.821	—
14	35	Riley Herbst	23XI Racing	Toyota	51.825	—
15	1	Ross Chastain	Trackhouse Racing	Chevrolet	51.841	—
16	22	Joey Logano (CC)	Team Penske	Ford	51.848	—
17	24	William Byron (CC)	Hendrick Motorsports	Chevrolet	51.851	—
18	9	Chase Elliott (CC)	Hendrick Motorsports	Chevrolet	51.862	—
19	60	Ryan Preece (CC)	RFK Racing	Ford	51.862	—
20	41	Cole Custer	Haas Factory Team	Chevrolet	51.866	—
21	21	Josh Berry	Wood Brothers Racing	Ford	51.898	—
22	6	Brad Keselowski	RFK Racing	Ford	51.943	—
23	71	Michael McDowell	Spire Motorsports	Chevrolet	51.956	—
24	47	Ricky Stenhouse Jr.	Hyak Motorsports	Chevrolet	51.969	—
25	23	Bubba Wallace (CC)	23XI Racing	Toyota	51.980	—
26	77	Carson Hocevar (CC)	Spire Motorsports	Chevrolet	51.984	—
27	12	Ryan Blaney (CC)	Team Penske	Ford	52.036	—
28	2	Austin Cindric (CC)	Team Penske	Ford	52.036	—
29	43	Erik Jones	Legacy Motor Club	Toyota	52.075	—
30	10	Ty Dillon	Kaulig Racing	Chevrolet	52.089	—
31	38	Zane Smith	Front Row Motorsports	Ford	52.112	—
32	42	John Hunter Nemechek	Legacy Motor Club	Toyota	52.131	—
33	45	Tyler Reddick (CC)	23XI Racing	Toyota	52.146	—
34	62	Casey Mears	Beard Motorsports	Chevrolet	52.263	—
35	34	Todd Gilliland	Front Row Motorsports	Ford	52.264	—
36	78	Daniel Dye (i)	Live Fast Motorsports	Chevrolet	52.325	—
37	16	A. J. Allmendinger	Kaulig Racing	Chevrolet	52.456	—
38	44	Joey Gase (i)	NY Racing Team	Chevrolet	52.570	—
39	4	Noah Gragson	Front Row Motorsports	Ford	52.674	—
40	66	Gray Gaulding (i)	Garage 66	Ford	52.875	—
Official qualifying results

== Race ==
=== Race results ===
==== Stage Results ====
Stage One Laps: 98

Pos	No	Driver	Team	Manufacturer	Points
1	17	Chris Buescher (CC)	RFK Racing	Ford	10
2	60	Ryan Preece (CC)	RFK Racing	Ford	9
3	6	Brad Keselowski	RFK Racing	Ford	8
4	5	Kyle Larson (CC)	Hendrick Motorsports	Chevrolet	7
5	24	William Byron (CC)	Hendrick Motorsports	Chevrolet	6
6	35	Riley Herbst	23XI Racing	Toyota	5
7	19	Chase Briscoe (CC)	Joe Gibbs Racing	Toyota	4
8	12	Ryan Blaney (CC)	Team Penske	Ford	3
9	22	Joey Logano (CC)	Team Penske	Ford	2
10	2	Austin Cindric (CC)	Team Penske	Ford	1

Stage Two Laps: 45

Pos	No	Driver	Team	Manufacturer	Points
1	22	Joey Logano (CC)	Team Penske	Ford	10
2	5	Kyle Larson (CC)	Hendrick Motorsports	Chevrolet	9
3	19	Chase Briscoe (CC)	Joe Gibbs Racing	Toyota	8
4	2	Austin Cindric (CC)	Team Penske	Ford	7
5	24	William Byron (CC)	Hendrick Motorsports	Chevrolet	6
6	17	Chris Buescher (CC)	RFK Racing	Ford	5
7	88	Connor Zilisch (R)	Trackhouse Racing	Chevrolet	4
8	97	Shane van Gisbergen	Trackhouse Racing	Chevrolet	3
9	43	Erik Jones	Legacy Motor Club	Toyota	2
10	33	Austin Hill (i)	Richard Childress Racing	Chevrolet	0

=== Final Stage Results ===
Stage Three Laps: 45

Pos	Grid	No	Driver	Team	Manufacturer	Laps	Points
1	10	5	Kyle Larson (CC)	Hendrick Motorsports	Chevrolet	189	71
2	17	24	William Byron (CC)	Hendrick Motorsports	Chevrolet	189	47
3	24	47	Ricky Stenhouse Jr	Hyak Motorsports	Chevrolet	189	34
4	15	1	Ross Chastain	Trackhouse Racing Team	Chevrolet	189	33
5	20	41	Cole Custer	Haas Factory Team	Chevrolet	189	32
6	26	77	Carson Hocevar (CC)	Spire Motorsports	Chevrolet	189	31
7	35	34	Todd Gilliland	Front Row Motorsports	Ford	189	30
8	9	11	Denny Hamlin (CC)	Joe Gibbs Racing	Toyota	189	29
9	7	48	Alex Bowman	Hendrick Motorsports	Chevrolet	189	28
10	23	71	Michael McDowell	Spire Motorsports	Chevrolet	189	27
11	12	3	Austin Dillon	Richard Childress Racing	Chevrolet	189	26
12	21	21	Josh Berry	Wood Brothers Racing	Ford	189	25
13	19	60	Ryan Preece (CC)	RFK Racing	Ford	189	33
14	2	33	Austin Hill (i)	Richard Childress Racing	Chevrolet	189	0
15	30	10	Ty Dillon	Kaulig Racing	Chevrolet	188	22
16	11	51	Cody Ware	Rick Ware Racing	Chevrolet	188	21
17	8	54	Ty Gibbs (CC)	Joe Gibbs Racing	Toyota	188	20
18	13	7	Daniel Suárez (CC)	Spire Motorsports	Chevrolet	188	19
19	31	38	Zane Smith	Front Row Motorsports	Ford	187	18
20	39	4	Noah Gragson	Front Row Motorsports	Ford	186	17
21	38	44	Joey Gase (i)	NY Racing Team	Chevrolet	186	0
22	25	23	Bubba Wallace (CC)	23XI Racing	Toyota	185	15
23	40	66	Gray Gaulding (i)	Garage 66	Ford	185	0
24	22	6	Brad Keselowski	RFK Racing	Ford	184	21
25	36	78	Daniel Dye (i)	Live Fast Motorsports	Chevrolet	184	0
26	14	35	Riley Herbst	23XI Racing	Toyota	183	16
27	28	2	Austin Cindric (CC)	Team Penske	Ford	183	18
28	29	43	Erik Jones	Legacy Motor Club	Toyota	183	11
29	3	88	Connor Zilisch (R)	Trackhouse Racing	Chevrolet	183	12
30	4	97	Shane Van Gisbergen	Trackhouse Racing	Chevrolet	183	10
31	37	16	A. J. Allmendinger	Kaulig Racing	Chevrolet	183	6
32	5	17	Chris Buescher (CC)	RFK Racing	Ford	183	20
33	1	19	Chase Briscoe (CC)	Joe Gibbs Racing	Toyota	183	16
34	16	22	Joey Logano (CC)	Team Penske	Ford	183	15
35	6	20	Christopher Bell (CC)	Joe Gibbs Racing	Toyota	177	2
36	18	9	Chase Elliott (CC)	Hendrick Motorsports	Chevrolet	147	2
37	33	45	Tyler Reddick (CC)	23XI Racing	Toyota	137	1
38	27	12	Ryan Blaney (CC)	Team Penske	Ford	131	4
39	32	42	John Hunter Nemechek	Legacy Motor Club	Toyota	131	1
40	34	62	Casey Mears	Beard Motorsports	Chevrolet	131	1
Official race results

=== Race statistics ===
- Lead changes: 41 among 15 different drivers
- Cautions/Laps: 4 for 18
- Red flags: 1 for 13 minutes and 25 seconds
- Time of race: 3 hours, 7 minutes and 54 seconds
- Average speed: 160.534 miles per hour (258.354 km/h)

== Media ==
=== Television ===
NBC covered the race on the television side. Leigh Diffey, Jeff Burton and Steve Letarte called the race from the broadcast booth. Dave Burns, Kim Coon, Marty Snider and Trevor Bayne handled pit road for the television side.

NBC
Booth announcers	Pit reporters
Lap-by-lap: Leigh Diffey; Color-commentator: Jeff Burton; Color-commentator: Steve Letarte	Dave Burns; Kim Coon; Marty Snider; Trevor Bayne

=== Radio ===
MRN had the radio call for the race which was also simulcasted on Sirius XM NASCAR Radio. Alex Hayden, Mike Bagley, & former championship winning crew chief Todd Gordon called the race in the booth when the field raced through the tri-oval. Dave Moody called the race from the Sunoco spotters stand outside turn 2 when the field raced through turns 1 and 2. Kyle Rickey called the race from a platform inside the backstretch when the field raced down the backstretch and Tim Catafalmo called the race from the Sunoco spotters stand outside turn 4 when the field raced through turns 3 and 4. Steve Post, Chris Wilner, Alex Weaver, and Jacklyn Drake worked pit road for the radio side for MRN.

MRN Radio
Booth announcers	Turn announcers	Pit reporters
Lead announcer: Alex Hayden; Announcer: Mike Bagley; Announcer: Todd Gordon	Turns 1 & 2: Dave Moody; Backstretch: Kyle Rickey; Turns 3 & 4: Tim Catafalmo	Steve Post; Chris Wilner; Alex Weaver; Jacklyn Drake

== Standings after the race ==
Drivers' Championship standings

	Pos	Driver	Points
	1	Kyle Larson	2,441
2	2	Denny Hamlin	2,368 (–73)
1	3	Christopher Bell	2,367 (–74)
1	4	Chase Briscoe	2,362 (–79)
1	5	Joey Logano	2,341 (–100)
1	6	Ryan Blaney	2,334 (–107)
	7	Tyler Reddick	2,315 (–126)
	8	Austin Cindric	2,258 (–183)
	9	Ty Gibbs	2,258 (–183)
1	10	Carson Hocevar	2,243 (–198)
3	11	William Byron	2,227 (–214)
3	12	Chase Elliott	2,223 (–218)
	13	Bubba Wallace	2,223 (–218)
1	14	Daniel Suárez	2,201 (–240)
1	15	Ryan Preece	2,192 (–249)
1	16	Chris Buescher	2,186 (–255)
Official driver's standings

Manufacturers' Championship standings

Pos	Manufacturer	Points
1	Toyota	1,518
2	Chevrolet	1,327 (–191)
3	Ford	1,254 (–264)

- Note: Only the first 16 positions are included for the driver standings.

Previous race: 2026 Freeway Insurance 500	NASCAR Cup Series; 2026 season	Next race: 2026 Xfinity 500
