= Freeway Insurance =

American insurance agency

- Industry: Insurance
- Founded: 1987; 39 years ago
- Headquarters: Huntington Beach, California, United States
- Number of locations: 650+
- Area served: United States
- Key people: Cesar Soriano (CEO)
- Number of employees: 2,000
- Parent: Confie
- Website: https://www.freeway.com/

Freeway Insurance Services America, LLC, or Freeway Insurance, is an American insurance agency with over 650 retail locations in the United States.The company sells auto insurance through multiple insurance carriers and also offers homeowners, renters, health, and motorcycle insurance products.The company's headquarters is in Huntington Beach, California.

== History ==
Freeway Insurance was founded in 1987 by Kelly Turton in Orange County, California. Initially, the company’s focus was private passenger automobile insurance,. which was then acquired by Westline Corp.,. which was then acquired by Confie, one of the largest privately held insurance brokers in the United States. and a portfolio company of private equity firm ABRY Partners.

In 2008 Freeway Insurance has expanded through acquisitions made by Confie, including Colyer Insurance, DeFranco Insurance, CW Baker Insurance, Lewiston Insurance, AutoPartners Insurance Agency, ^{[30].}and Showers Insurance Agency. ^{[31]}

In 2021, Freeway Insurance became a sponsor for Trackhouse Racing Team’s No. 99 Chevrolet Camaro, driven by Daniel Suarez in the NASCAR Cup Series. Freeway Insurance has also partnered with the California DMV to register and document vehicles.

In April 2021, Alliant insurance agreed to buy Confie, which includes Freeway Insurance.

== Operations ==
Freeway Insurance sells auto insurance through multiple insurance carriers and serves a broad customer base, including drivers with prior violations, accidents, or SR-22 filing requirements. As of 2020, it sells home owners and renter’s insurance , health insurance, . and motorcycle insurance. As of 2025, Freeway Insurance operates more than 650 retail locations across 25 U.S. states.

Since 2008, Freeway Insurance has operated in English and Spanish, and nearly 50% of its customers identify themselves as Hispanic or Latino. Freeway reports that nearly 70 percent of their insurance agents are multilingual .

In 2021, Freeway Insurance announced plans to expand through franchising in the United States. In 2024, the company reported opening 31 franchise locations across multiple states. In 2025, Freeway announced the opening of 53 additional franchise locations, including its first location in Connecticut.

== Sponsorships ==
In 2021, Freeway Insurance began a motorsports sponsorship with a partnership with Trackhouse Racing and NASCAR driver Daniel Suárez . In February 2022, Freeway Insurance announced it would serve as the primary sponsor of Daniel Suárez for five NASCAR Cup Series events. In October 2025, Freeway expanded its motorsports sponsorship through a partnership with Spire Motorsports.

On October 31, 2025, NASCAR announced Freeway Insurance as its fourth Premier Partner for the NASCAR Cup Series, replacing GEICO.

Freeway Insurance is the entitlement sponsor of the Freeway Insurance 500, a NASCAR Cup Series race held at Phoenix Raceway.
