= WWE Podcast Network =

American professional wrestling podcasts

WWE Podcast Network is a series of podcasts produced and distributed by the American professional wrestling promotion WWE, a division of TKO Group Holdings, a majority-owned subsidiary of Endeavor Group Holdings.

== History ==
In August 2019, WWE and Endeavor announced an expansion of their current arrangement for the WWE Network, to expand it to the production of podcasts.

In October 2019, the first podcast, After The Bell hosted by Corey Graves, was announced. The following month, the second podcast, The New Day: Feel The Power hosted by The New Day (Big E, Kofi Kingston, and Xavier Woods), was announced.

In April 2020, WWE added their third podcast, WWE's The Bump. The podcast was an audio version of their web series, featuring highlights and interviews from the show. The audio version of The Bump ran for 24 episodes before concluding in July 2020.

In June 2020, it was announced that WWE would add a fourth podcast. In an interview with Fox Sports, Alexa Bliss confirmed she would be hosting the podcast. The podcast, titled Uncool with Alexa Bliss, debuted in September 2020. The podcast featured various WWE wrestlers and celebrities discussing uncool things they did when they were younger. The show ran for 12 episodes between September and December 2020.

In August 2021, WWE migrated their current podcasts to The Ringer Podcast Network, a subsidiary of Spotify after forming an audio partnership. Alongside the current podcast line-up, WWE and The Ringer collaborated on new content that will become exclusive to Spotify.

In November 2023, the last episodes of After The Bell with Corey Graves and The New Day: Feel the Power were released before both podcasts being discontinued, marking an end to the WWE Podcasts series.

In March 2025, WWE partnered with Fanatics, Inc. to bring back the WWE Podcasts series, with a new show called What's Your Story? With Steph McMahon, hosted by Stephanie McMahon.

== Podcast shows ==
Podcast Title	Host(s)	Partner	Years active	Notes
After The Bell	Corey Graves	Endeavor, The Ringer	2019–2023	
The New Day: Feel The Power	Big E, Kofi Kingston, Xavier Woods	Endeavor, The Ringer	2019–2023	
WWE's The Bump (Audio)	Kayla Braxton, Matt Camp, Evan T. Mack	Endeavor, The Ringer	2020	
Uncool with Alexa Bliss	Alexa Bliss	Endeavor, The Ringer	2020	
Six Feet Under	The Undertaker, Michelle McCool	Fanatics	2023–ongoing	Originally launched independently in 2023; relaunched under WWE/Fanatics in 2025.
Impaulsive	Logan Paul, Mike Majlak	Fanatics	2018–ongoing	Originally launched independently in 2018; joined WWE/Fanatics in 2025.
WWE Now	Megan Morant, Sam Roberts	Fanatics	2025–ongoing	Originally named The Raw Recap Show in 2025. Includes Premium Live Event recap shows.
What Do You Wanna Talk About?	Cody Rhodes	Fanatics	2025–ongoing	
What's Your Story?	Stephanie McMahon	Fanatics	2025–ongoing	Also known as: "What's Your Story? With Steph McMahon"
