= Confie =

American private insurance company

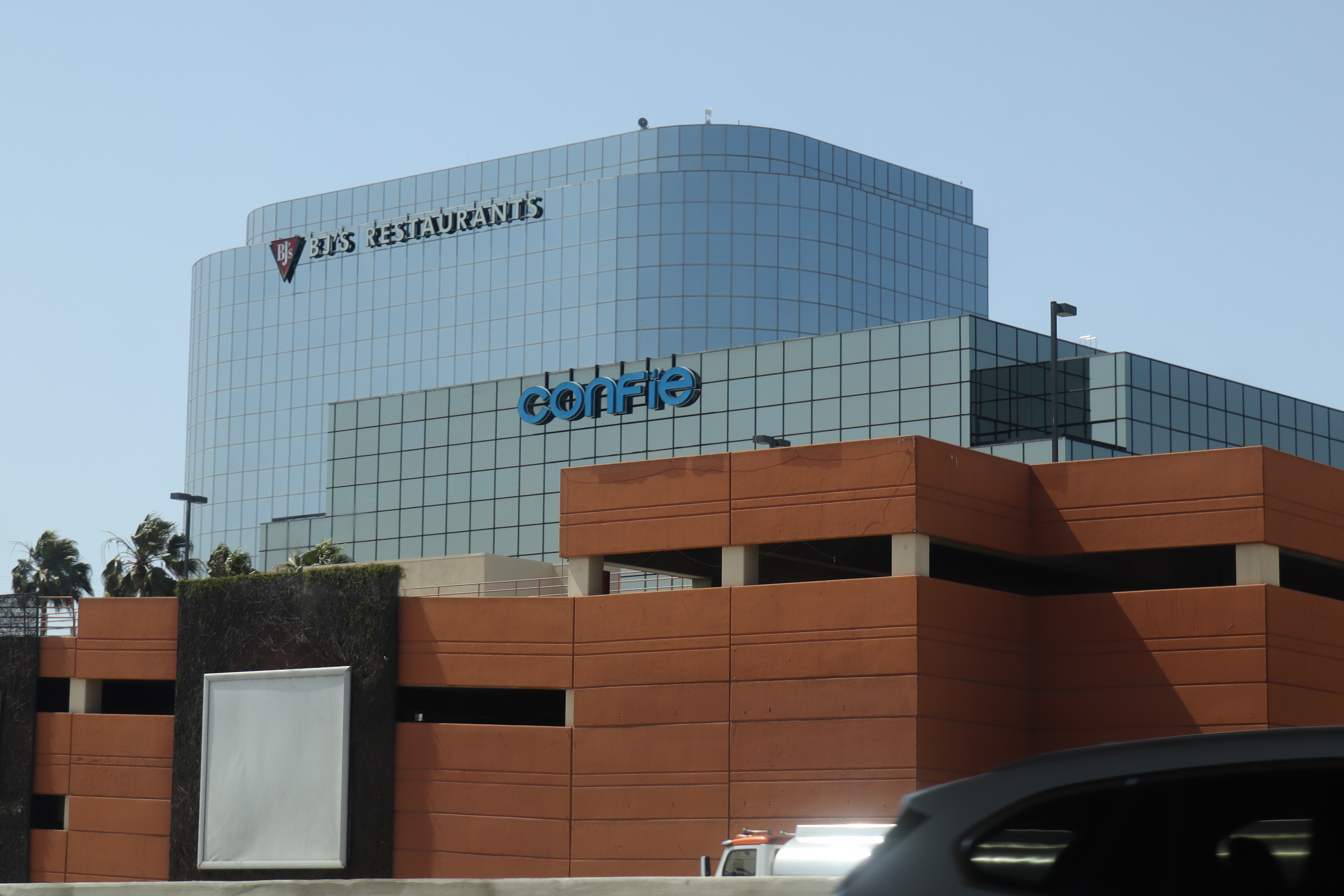
- Headquarters in Huntington Beach, California (pictured center)
- Type: Private company
- Industry: Insurance
- Founded: 2008; 18 years ago
- Headquarters: Huntington Beach, California, United States
- Area served: United States
- Key people: Cesar Soriano, Chief Executive Officer
- Number of employees: Approximately 6500 (2026)
- Subsidiaries: Freeway Insurance
- Website: www.confie.com

Confie is an American insurance distribution company that provides personal and commercial insurance products through retail agencies, franchise, and managing general agencies.. Confie is the largest independent property and casualty insurance agency in the United States based as of 2025.

Its brands include Freeway Insurance, Acceptance Insurance, InsureOne Insurance, and Bluefire Insurance.

== History ==
Initially known as Confie Seguros, the company was founded in 2008 by Mordy Rothberg, Joseph Waked and John Addeo. They aimed to make Confie a national insurance distribution company focusing on the Hispanic market. Addeo initially served as the company’s CEO before stepping down in January 2012, upon which Waked assumed CEO duties.

Confie expanded in part by acquiring insurance brokers throughout the United States. One of the company’s first acquisitions was Westline Insurance, which became the basis for their West Coast operations and their Freeway Insurance brand. In December 2023, with the acquisition of Acceptance Insurance, Confie expanded its physical footprint to 26 states. With the acquisition of Affordable Insurance in North Carolina, it expanded its footprint to 27 states.

The company's launch was initially backed by Genstar Capital, which held a majority stake in the company before selling it in 2012. Private equity firm ABRY Partners acquired Genstar Capital’s majority stake in Confie in late 2012.

Cesar Soriano has been the CEO since August 2017, while Valeria Rico was CEO from 2014 to 2016. Company president and co-founder Mordy Rothberg also exited the company in 2018.

In 2020, Insurance Journal ranked Confie as the top personal lines insurance agency and the ninth largest independent property and casualty insurance agency in the United States based on 2019 revenue data. In 2024, it ranked #1 spot for Top 100 Property/Casualty Agencies based on 2023 revenue data.

On April 21, 2021, it was announced that Alliant Insurance Services would merge with Confie...

== Operations ==
Operating through its subsidiaries, its operations are divided into four segments: non-standard insurance, standard insurance, general agency and automotive dealer insurance.

Over the years they have acquired many other insurance companies, including:

- Cost U Less Insurance (2010)
- Baja Auto Insurance (2015)
- USAgencies Insurance (2013)
- Vern Fonk Insurance (2010)
- Oasis Insurance (2016)
- Southern Harvest Insurance (2019)
- De France Insurance Agency (2013)
- James Sullivan Insurance (2013)
- Coyler Insurance (2015)
- Most Insurance
- Rodney D. Young Insurance Group (2017)
- Luxor Insurance (2019)
- OneSource Dealer Solutions
- Retail Agency Group (2013)
- Estrella Insurance (2023)
- Acceptance Insurance (2023)

== Legal issues ==
In 2015, Confie purchased insurance brokerage MGA, which led to a lawsuit of billionaire J. Christopher Flowers, the primary stockholder, who was accused of withholding information.

In 2018, an Illinois federal judge ruled in favor of Confie and against J.C. Flowers & Co. when Flowers filed a motion to dismiss the lawsuit related to the MGA acquisition.
