= Fat Man (disambiguation) =

Fat Man is the codename for the atomic bomb that was detonated over the Japanese city of Nagasaki by the United States on August 9, 1945.

Fat Man or Fatman may also refer to:

== People ==
- Kaytron Allen, American football player known as "Fatman"
- Fats Domino, or "the Fat Man", American rock and roll singer
- George Sanger, or "the Fat Man", American video game music composer
- Fatman Scoop (born 1971), American hip hop artist
- Kevin Smith, American film director who uses "Fatman" as an online alias
- Tom Vernon, or "Fat Man", British broadcaster and travelogue writer
- Dave "Fat Man" Williams, American jazz, blues, and rhythm & blues pianist, bandleader, singer, and songwriter

== Arts and entertainment ==
=== Characters ===
- Fatman, in the video game The Adventures of Fatman
- Fatman, the Batman imitator character
- "The fat man" or Kasper Gutman, played by Sydney Greenstreet in the 1941 film The Maltese Falcon
- Fatman or Jason McCabe, in the television series Jake and the Fatman, played by William Conrad
- Fatman the Human Flying Saucer, a comic book superhero created in the 1960s
- Fatman (Metal Gear), in the video game Metal Gear Solid 2
- Fatman the Mister America comic book character sidekick.
- Peter Griffin in the TV series Family Guy, who is called "The Fat Man" by his son Stewie

=== Film and television ===
- The Fat Man (film), a 1951 film
- Fatman (2020 film), a film starring Mel Gibson
- The Fat Man (radio), a radio detective show

=== Music ===
- "The Fat Man" (song), a 1949 Fats Domino song
- "Fat Man", a 1969 song by Jethro Tull from Stand Up
- "Fat Man", a 1980 song by Kevin Coyne from Sanity Stomp
- "Fat Man", a 1971 song by Nazareth from Nazareth
- "Fatman", a song by Icehouse from Icehouse

== Other uses ==
- Fatman Mountain, Montana, United States
- FaTMAN, the Fife and Tayside Metropolitan Area (computer) Network
- Gippsland GA200 or GA200 Fatman, an agricultural aircraft
- A variant of the trolley problem

== See also ==
- Fat Boy (disambiguation)
- Thin Man (disambiguation)
