= Harrison Burton =

American racing driver (born 2000)

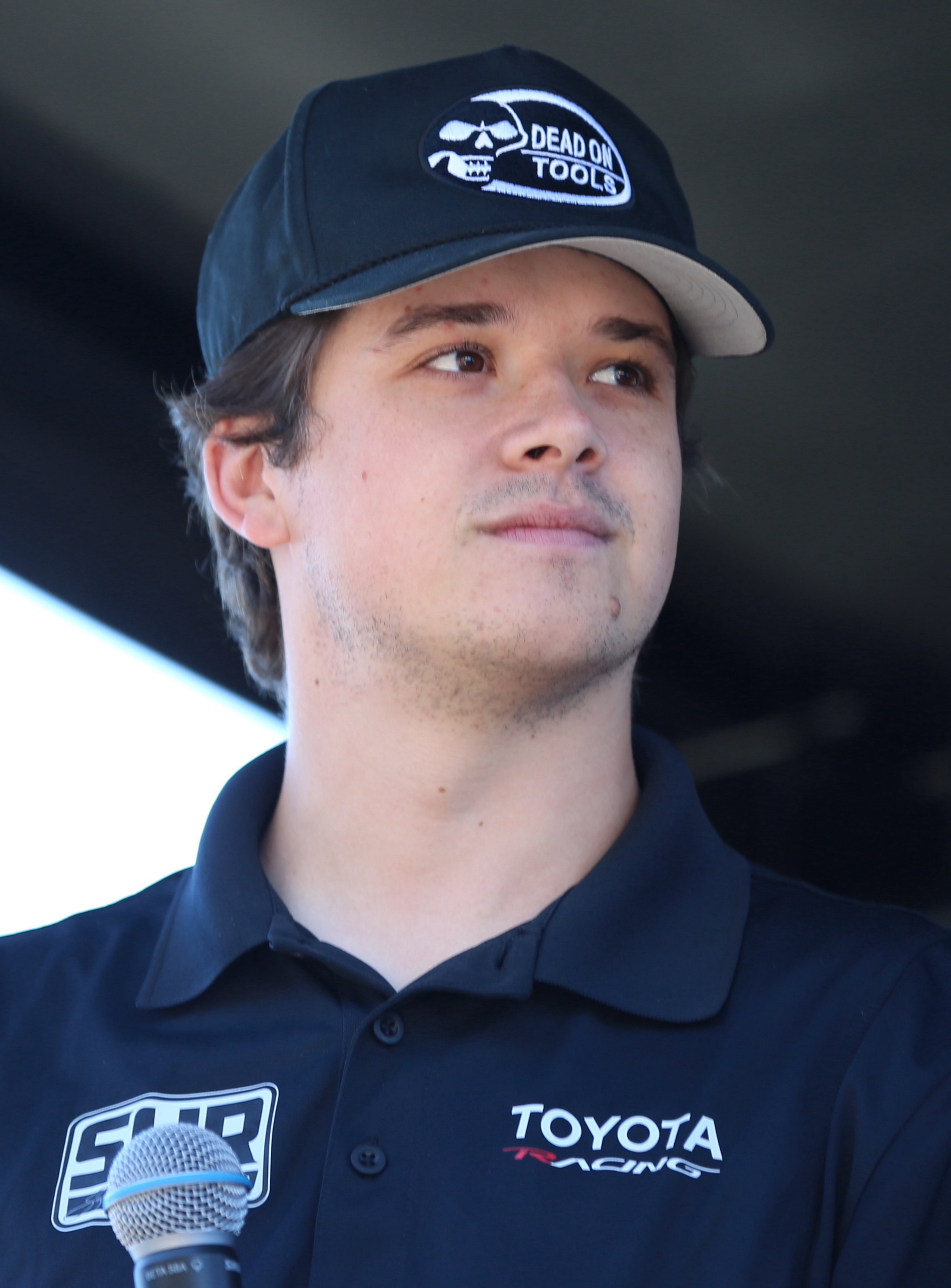
- Burton at Sonoma Raceway in 2026
- Born: Harrison Brian Burton; October 9, 2000 (age 26); Huntersville, North Carolina, U.S.
- Height: 5 ft 11 in (1.80 m)
- Weight: 180 lb (82 kg)
- Achievements: 2017 NASCAR K&N Pro Series East Champion; 2017 World Series of Asphalt Super Late Model Champion; 2017 SpeedFest 200 Winner; 2018 Rattler 250 Winner
- Awards: 2020 NASCAR Xfinity Series Rookie of the Year

NASCAR Cup Series career
- 110 races run over 5 years
- 2026 position: 43rd
- Best finish: 16th (2024)
- First race: 2021 GEICO 500 (Talladega)
- Last race: 2026 Coke Zero Sugar 400 (Daytona)
- First win: 2024 Coke Zero Sugar 400 (Daytona)
Wins	Top tens	Poles
1	6	0

NASCAR O'Reilly Auto Parts Series career
- 141 races run over 5 years
- Car no., team: No. 78 (Peterson Racing)
- 2026 position: 19th
- Best finish: 8th (2020, 2021)
- First race: 2019 Alsco 300 (Bristol)
- Last race: 2026 O'Reilly Auto Parts 300 (Homestead)
- First win: 2020 Production Alliance Group 300 (California)
- Last win: 2020 Draft Top 250 (Martinsville)
Wins	Top tens	Poles
4	62	1

NASCAR FedEx Freight Truck Series career
- 41 races run over 6 years
- 2026 position: 112th
- Best finish: 12th (2019)
- First race: 2016 Texas Roadhouse 200 (Martinsville)
- Last race: 2026 TSport 200 (IRP)
Wins	Top tens	Poles
0	18	1

ARCA Menards Series career
- 17 races run over 4 years
- Best finish: 16th (2018)
- First race: 2016 ABC Supply 150 (Iowa)
- Last race: 2019 Kansas ARCA 150 (Kansas)
- First win: 2017 Menards 200 (Toledo)
- Last win: 2019 Lucas Oil 200 (Daytona)
Wins	Top tens	Poles
3	15	1

ARCA Menards Series East career
- 33 races run over 3 years
- Best finish: 1st (2017)
- First race: 2016 Jet Tools 150 (New Smyrna)
- Last race: 2018 Crosley 125 (Dover)
- First win: 2017 Zombie Auto 125 (Bristol)
- Last win: 2017 National Fallen Firefighters Association 125 (Dover)
Wins	Top tens	Poles
5	24	4

ARCA Menards Series West career
- 2 races run over 1 year
- Best finish: 32nd (2015)
- First race: 2015 NAPA Auto Parts/Toyota 150 presented by Axle Crutch (Roseville)
- Last race: 2015 Casino Arizona 100 (Phoenix)
Wins	Top tens	Poles
0	1	0
- Statistics up to date as of November 8, 2026.

Harrison Brian Burton (born October 9, 2000) is an American professional stock car racing driver. He competes full-time in the NASCAR O'Reilly Auto Parts Series, driving the No. 78 Chevrolet Camaro SS for Peterson Racing. He is the son of former NASCAR driver Jeff Burton. In 2020, Burton became the first driver born in the 2000s or later to win a NASCAR O'Reilly Auto Parts Series race, and in 2024 became the first to win a NASCAR Cup Series race.

== Racing career ==
=== Early years ===
Burton's racing career started off when he received a go-kart at age two, which later turned into a quarter midget at age four. After starting to race them at age twelve, Burton won his first late model race in early 2014. His first super late model win came in early 2015, at New Smyrna Speedway. He was also for three years a USAC quarter midget championship. At the age of eleven, he grabbed his first late model pole at Ace Speedway, and at twelve won two races in pro late models.

=== CARS Super Late Model Tour ===
The Charlotte, North Carolina native made his CARS debut in 2015, running six of the series' ten races. Finishing only two of those races, he finished third at Southern National Motorsports Park and fourth at Concord Speedway. In the middle of that season, the team switched car bodies and crew chiefs, hiring former Xfinity Series driver Chris Wimmer. Switching his focus to the NASCAR K&N Pro Series East, he only ran three of eight races in 2016, recording two top ten finishes.

=== ARCA Menards Series ===
In his ARCA Racing Series debut for Ranier Racing with MDM, Burton started sixth and finished third after almost being spun out by eventual race winner Chase Briscoe. Returning in 2017 with MDM Motorsports, Burton chased down Dalton Sargeant on the final run of the race at Toledo Speedway to win in only his second series start. He later won in his superspeedway debut, which came at Pocono Raceway in 2018. Burton dedicated the win to John Andretti, who was battling colon cancer until his death in 2020.

On January 8, 2018, it was announced that Burton would run a partial ARCA schedule with MDM in 2018.

On January 10, 2019, it was announced that Burton would drive the Venturini Motorsports No. 20 Toyota for five races in 2019. Burton won on his superspeedway debut at Daytona.

=== K&N Pro Series East ===
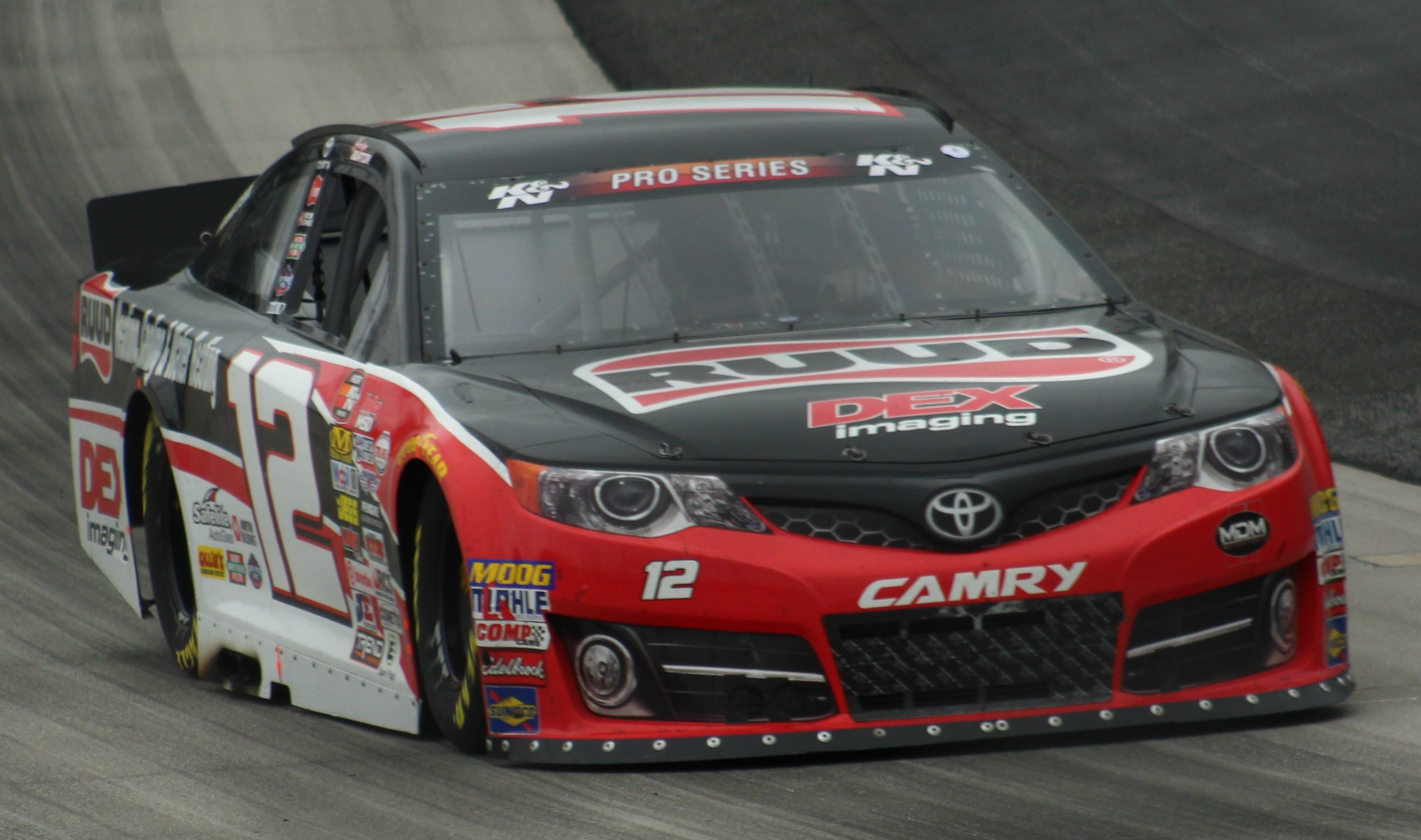
Burton's K&N East car at Dover International Speedway

Starting with the 2016 NASCAR K&N Pro Series East season opener at New Smyrna, Burton became the youngest driver to start a race in the series. He also garnered a full-time ride from HScott Motorsports using their Toyotas. Throughout the thirteen-race season, Burton garnered one pole, as many top fives, and finished eighth in the championship point standings while failing to finish two races. After HScott Motorsports with Justin Marks shut down, Burton moved to MDM Motorsports bringing his number and sponsor. He also signed an extension with Kevin Harvick Incorporated to bring in sponsors like DEX Imaging, Hunt Brothers Pizza, Rheem and others. Early in the season, Burton made waves by campaigning a paint scheme with the number on the rear quarter panels. His performance also gained attention, winning a rain-shortened race at Bristol. He then outlasted the field at Memphis the following race after Todd Gilliland had a flat tire. He went on to win five of fourteen races that season and beat Gilliland for the championship after making up an eight-point deficit going into the final race.

On January 8, 2018, it was announced that Burton would drive a partial K&N season with MDM in 2018. The first race of his part-time schedule came at the K&N East season opener at New Smyrna Speedway, where he finished 3rd after battling Todd Gilliland for the lead in the final laps.

=== Craftsman Truck Series ===
Burton signed on with Kyle Busch Motorsports to drive the No. 18 Toyota Tundra for the 2016 Alpha Energy Solutions 250 at Martinsville Speedway in late October. Due to NASCAR rules and regulations, maintaining that a driver has to be sixteen years of age before competing in any national series event, Burton was therefore barred from entering any events before October 9 of that year. He showed speed early, cracking the top ten in practice, but faltered during the race and finished one lap down in 22nd. In this race, Burton and Kyle Donahue (who was driving the No. 63 for MB Motorsports) made history as the first drivers born in the 2000s decade and the 21st century to compete in the Truck Series and in any NASCAR national series. Burton signed with Kyle Busch Motorsports to run both Martinsville races, as well as Dover, Iowa, Eldora, and Bristol in the No. 51 Toyota Tundra in 2017. He finished all of the races but only scored one top-ten, a fourth-place at Martinsville in fall.

On January 8, 2018, it was announced that Burton would again pilot the KBM No. 51 for a partial schedule. The nine-race schedule included mostly short tracks but also Canadian Tire Motorsport Park and all of the races after he turned eighteen. Burton grabbed his first pole in the M&M's 200, and finished third after dealing with throttle issues during the race. He won his first stage in NASCAR competition at ISM Raceway in November en route to another third-place finish.

On November 14, 2018, it was announced that Burton would run full-time in 2019, replacing Noah Gragson in KBM's No. 18 entry.

Burton would return to truck series competition in 2022, driving in a one-off race for David Gilliland Racing at the 2022 Pinty's Truck Race on Dirt.

In 2026, Burton would drive the No. 5 truck for Tricon Garage at IRP.

=== O'Reilly Auto Parts Series ===
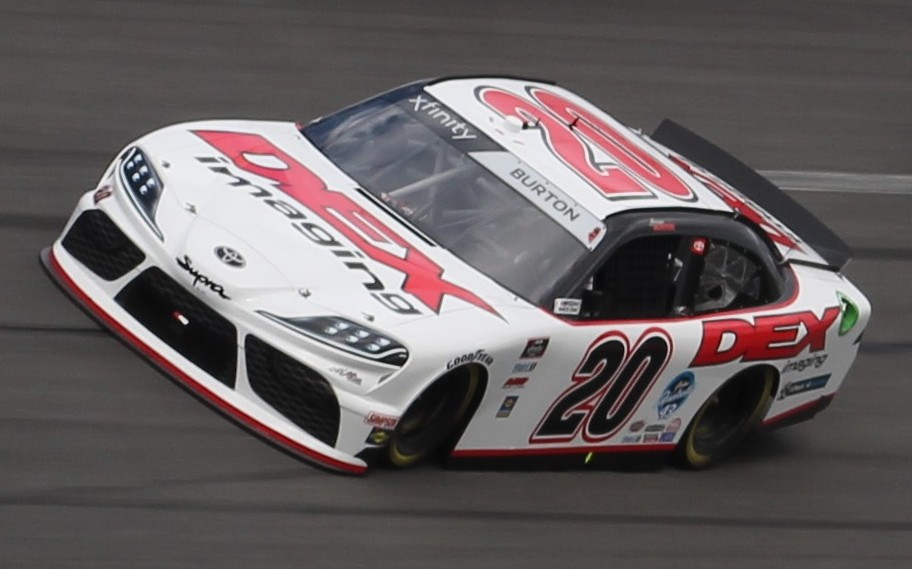
Burton's No. 20 car at Daytona International Speedway in 2020

On April 1, 2019, Joe Gibbs Racing announced Burton would drive the team's No. 18 Toyota Supra in the NASCAR Xfinity Series for eight races starting with the Alsco 300 at Bristol Motor Speedway five days later. In his third race of the year at New Hampshire Motor Speedway, Burton was intentionally wrecked by Paul Menard after Burton passed Menard with contact. Menard thought the incident was a teaching moment not to race dirty, while Burton was of the viewpoint that getting passed was not grounds for being wrecked.

On October 17, 2019, with Christopher Bell moving up to the NASCAR Cup Series, JGR announced Burton would replace him in the No. 20 Supra for the 2020 NASCAR Xfinity Series season.

On February 29, 2020, Burton earned his first career Xfinity Series win at Auto Club Speedway after holding off teammate Riley Herbst; the win made him and father Jeff Burton the only son-and-father duo to ever win at Auto Club and the second driver to ever win on Leap Day with the first being his uncle Ward Burton at Rockingham Speedway in 1992. This also made Burton the first driver born in the 2000s to win in the Xfinity Series. He qualified for the Xfinity Series playoffs after scoring two wins in the regular season, but was eliminated after the first round. He later passed Noah Gragson in the final set of corners at Texas Motor Speedway to grab a late-season post-elimination win. A week later, Harrison would go on to win again at Martinsville.

Burton returned to JGR for a second straight year in 2021. He advanced one round further in the playoffs but went winless, once again finishing 8th in the point standings.

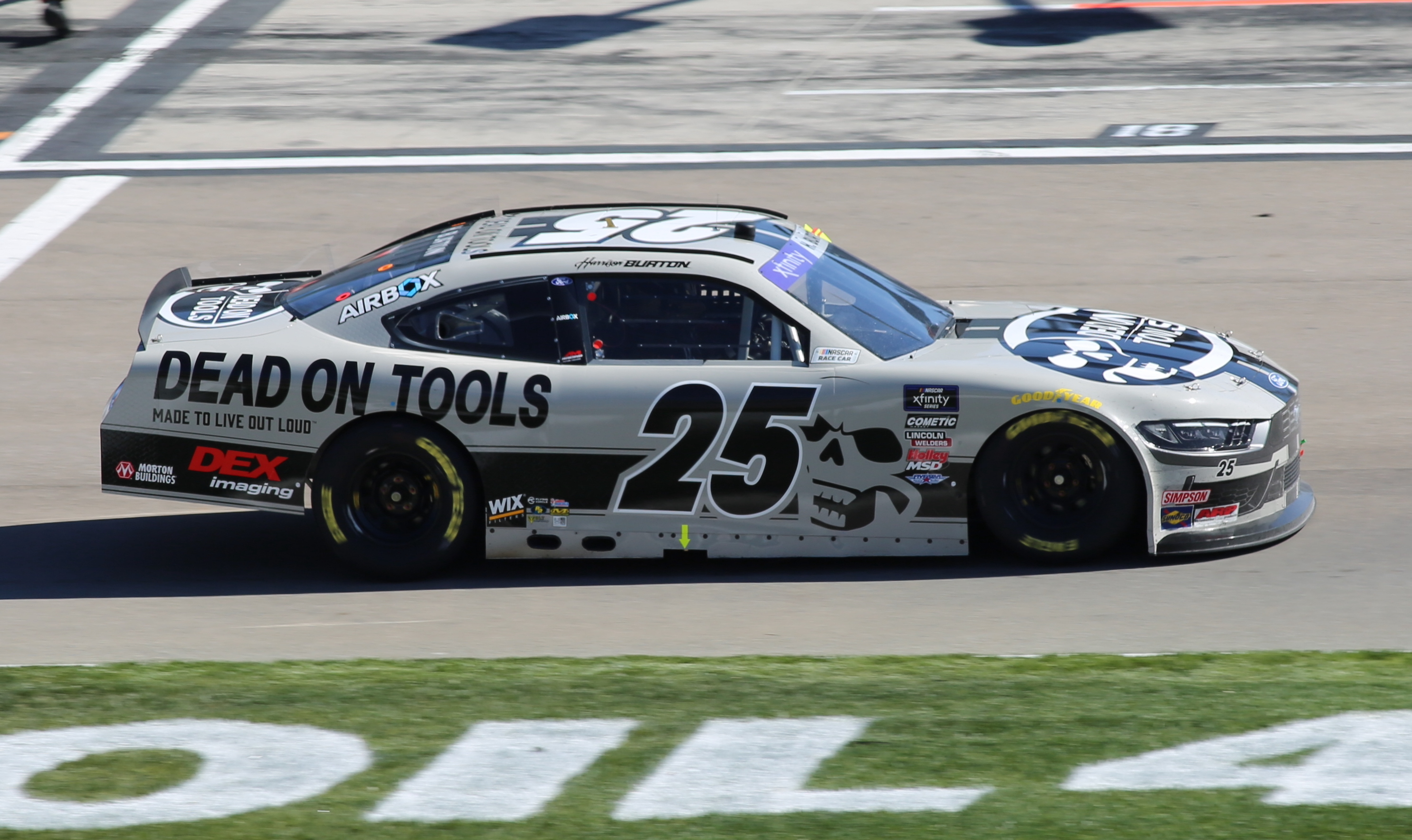
Burton's No. 25 car at Las Vegas Motor Speedway in 2025

On September 20, 2024, AM Racing announced that Burton would return to the Xfinity Series and drive the team's No. 25 Ford Mustang Dark Horse full-time in the 2025 Xfinity Series season. Burton stayed consistent throughout the regular season with nine top tens, and gave AM Racing their first playoff appearance. He was eliminated from the playoffs at the conclusion of the Round of 12. On October 8, it was announced that Burton and AM will part ways after the season.

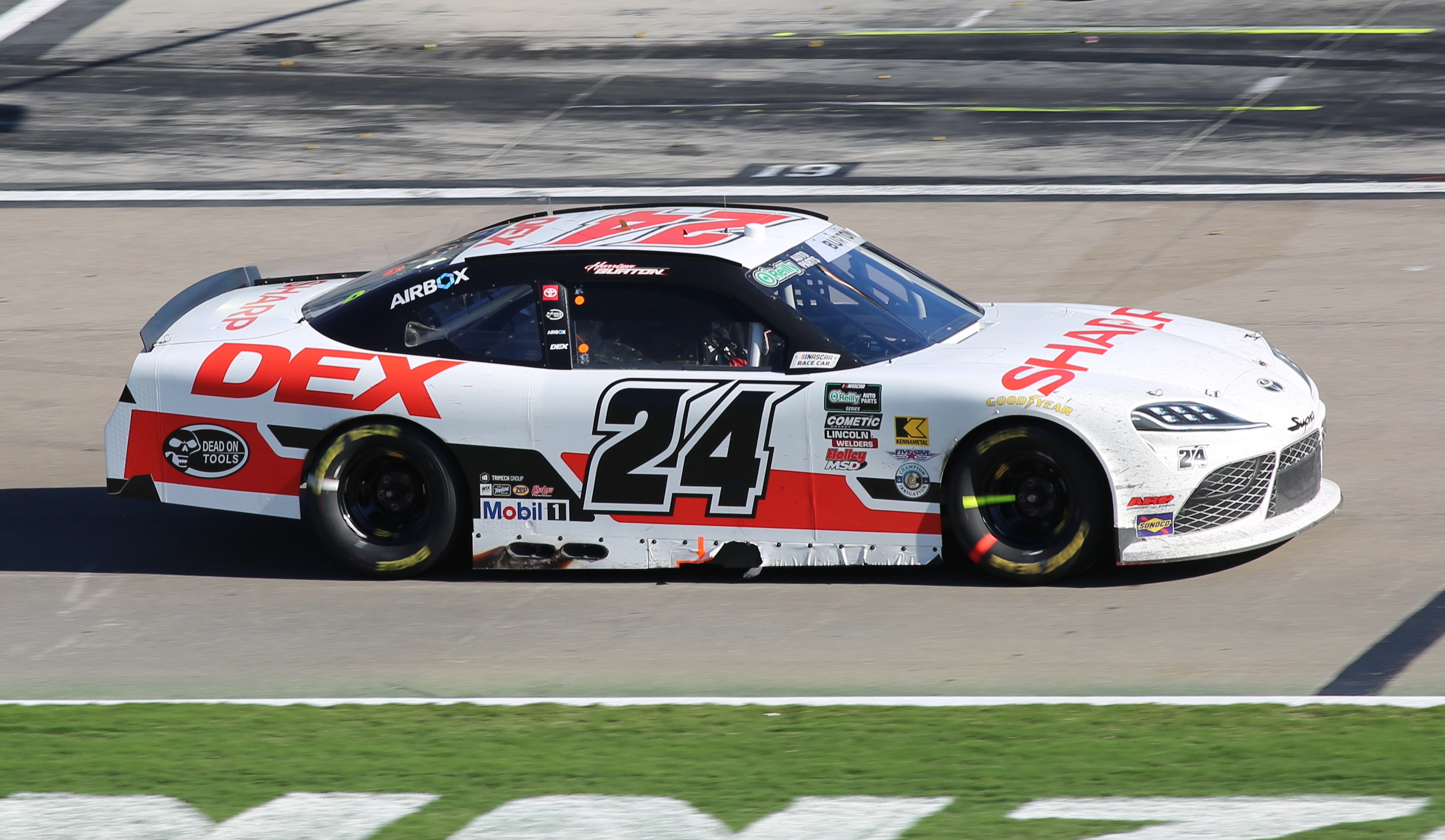
Burton's No. 24 car at Las Vegas Motor Speedway in 2026

On October 25, Sam Hunt Racing announced that Burton will drive the team's No. 24 Toyota GR Supra full-time in the 2026 season.

=== Cup Series ===
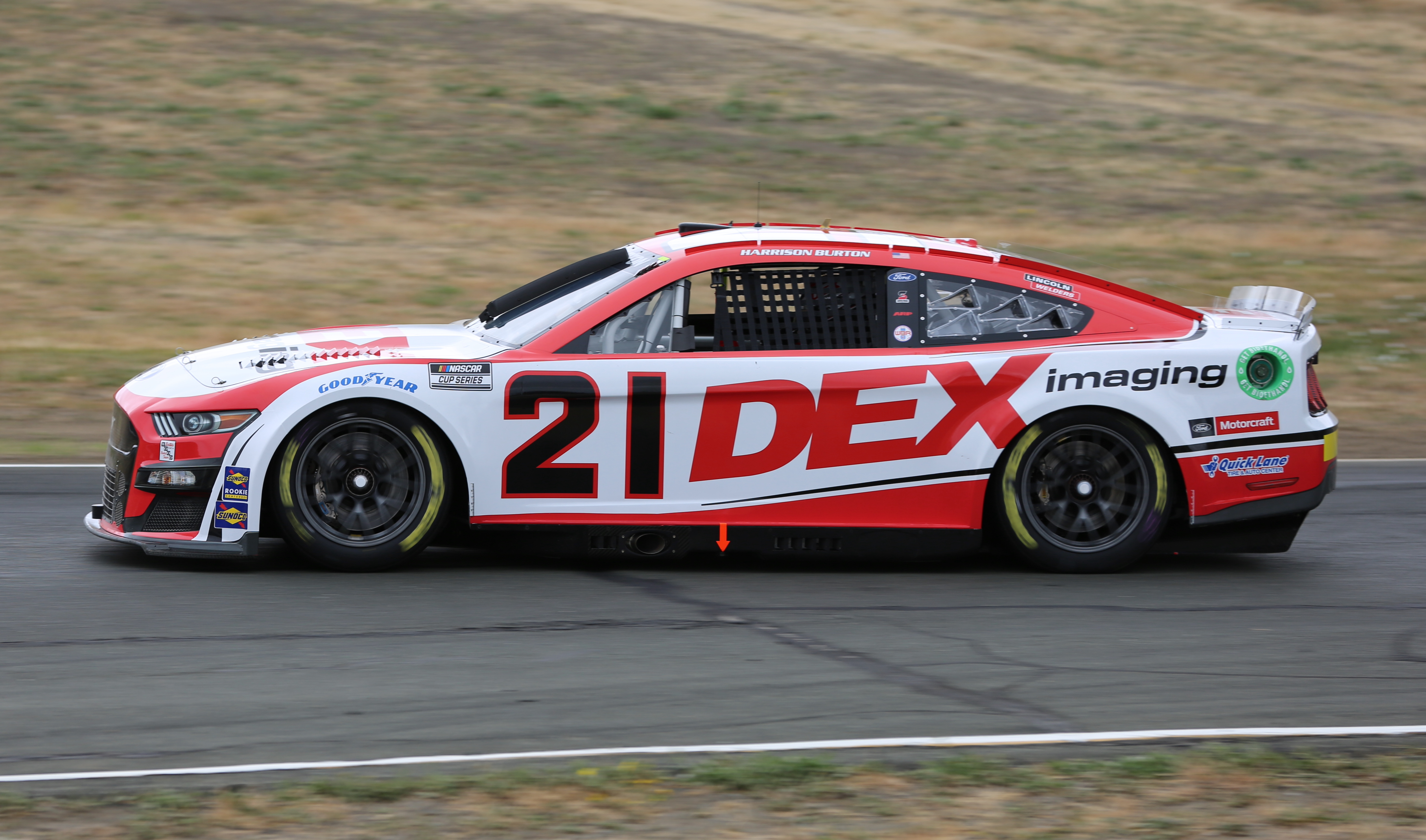
Burton’s No. 21 car at Sonoma Raceway in 2022

On April 15, 2021, Gaunt Brothers Racing announced that Burton would make his Cup Series debut with the team in their No. 96 Toyota in the race at Talladega that month, with his Xfinity Series sponsor, DEX Imaging, as the sponsor. In this race, Burton would become the first driver born in the 2000s decade to run a Cup Series race.

On July 15, 2021, Burton was named the driver of Wood Brothers Racing's No. 21 Ford Mustang for the 2022 season, replacing Matt DiBenedetto. Burton led three laps in his full-time debut at the 2022 Daytona 500, but flipped during a multi-car accident on lap 63 and finished 39th. A few months later, at Atlanta Motor Speedway on July 10, 2022, Burton led seven laps and recorded his first career Cup Series top-ten result with a tenth-place outcome. Shortly afterward, Burton bested his Atlanta result with a third place finish at the Indianapolis Motor Speedway on July 31, 2022.

Burton began the 2023 season with a 26th-place finish at the 2023 Daytona 500. Poor finishes plagued the No. 21 team, with Burton only scoring two top-ten finishes through the entire season. He would go on to finish 31st in the final points standings.

Burton started the 2024 season with a 39th-place DNF at the 2024 Daytona 500. His best finish in the season was tenth at Talladega. On July 3, it was announced that Josh Berry would replace Burton in the No. 21 in 2025. At the Daytona summer race, Burton beat out Kyle Busch by 0.047 seconds and scored his first career Cup Series win with his father Jeff in the booth. His win was also the 100th Cup Series win for the Wood Brothers and their first win since Ryan Blaney at Pocono in 2017. His win also secured him a spot in the playoffs for the first time in his Cup career. Unfortunately, he was eliminated from the playoffs at the conclusion of the Round of 16. Overall, Burton finished sixteenth in the standings, having scored just two top-tens across the entire season. His average finish of 25.7 proved to be the lowest of all full-time Cup Series drivers in 2024, as well as the lowest average finish of Burton's Cup career.

On May 12, 2025, Rick Ware Racing announced that Burton would drive their No. 51 car in the 2025 NASCAR All-Star Race, as his win at the 2024 Daytona summer race qualified him for the exhibition race for the first time in his career. Cody Ware, the driver normally in the No. 51, switched to the No. 15 for the All-Star Open. Burton finished twentieth out of 23 participants.

In 2026, Burton became the reserve driver for Legacy Motor Club in the Cup Series. He was almost needed to finish the race at Circuit of the Americas in the No. 43 car in place of Erik Jones when he was not feeling well but Jones was able to finish the race. On August 29th, 2026, it was confirmed that Burton would fill in for Riley Herbst in the No. 35 car for 23XI Racing after Herbst experienced concussion like symptoms after a crash at New Hampshire the weekend prior.

=== IMSA ===
Harrison Burton has also competed in the IMSA competition through Ford Motor Company's recent drive to train new competitors through their sports car program. With only a handful of starts, Burton, with Zane Smith, won the 2023 Daytona 4-hour race opener of IMSA’s Michelin Pilot Challenge calendar by 0.688 seconds.

== Personal life ==
Burton attended the Cannon School in Concord, North Carolina while racing. Upon graduating in 2019, he took a gap semester to focus on racing for the remainder of the year. He is a part of the Celebratory Cause. He is the son of former NASCAR driver and current NASCAR on NBC analyst Jeff Burton, nephew of former driver Ward Burton and cousin of current driver Jeb Burton.

== Motorsports career results ==
=== Career summary ===
Season	Series	Team	Races	Wins	Top 5	Top 10	Points	Position
2015	NASCAR K&N Pro Series West	Jeff Burton	2	0	0	1	71	32nd
2016	NASCAR Camping World Truck Series	Kyle Busch Motorsports	1	0	0	0	16	66th
2016	NASCAR K&N Pro Series East	HScott Motorsports with Justin Marks	14	0	1	5	444	7th
2016	ARCA Racing Series	Ranier Racing with MDM	1	0	1	1	215	89th
2017	NASCAR Camping World Truck Series	Kyle Busch Motorsports	6	0	1	1	162	29th
2017	NASCAR K&N Pro Series East	MDM Motorsports	14	5	12	14	593	**1st**
2017	ARCA Racing Series	MDM Motorsports	1	1	1	1	240	73rd
2018	NASCAR Camping World Truck Series	Kyle Busch Motorsports	8	0	3	6	277	18th
2018	NASCAR K&N Pro Series East	MDM Motorsports	5	0	4	5	200	17th
2018	ARCA Racing Series	MDM Motorsports	9	1	5	8	1840	16th
2019	NASCAR Xfinity Series	Joe Gibbs Racing	9	0	1	5	0	NC†
2019	NASCAR Gander Outdoors Truck Series	Kyle Busch Motorsports	23	0	7	11	707	12th
2019	ARCA Menards Series	Venturini Motorsports	6	1	3	5	1240	21st
2020	NASCAR Xfinity Series	Joe Gibbs Racing	33	4	15	22	2248	8th
2021	NASCAR Cup Series	Gaunt Brothers Racing	1	0	0	0	0	NC†
2021	NASCAR Xfinity Series	Joe Gibbs Racing	33	0	10	22	2194	8th
2022	NASCAR Cup Series	Wood Brothers Racing	36	0	1	2	573	27th
2022	NASCAR Camping World Truck Series	David Gilliland Racing	2	0	0	0	0	NC†
2022	Michelin Pilot Challenge – GS	PF Racing	1	0	0	1	220	54th
2023	NASCAR Cup Series	Wood Brothers Racing	36	0	0	2	452	31st
2023	Michelin Pilot Challenge – GS	PF Racing	1	1	1	1	350	37th
2024	NASCAR Cup Series	Wood Brothers Racing	36	1	1	2	2122	16th
2025	NASCAR Xfinity Series	AM Racing	33	0	2	10	2164	12th
2026	NASCAR Cup Series	23XI Racing	1	0	0	0	0	NC†
2026	NASCAR O'Reilly Auto Parts Series	Sam Hunt Racing	29	0	0	3	491*	20th*
2026	NASCAR Craftsman Truck Series	Tricon Garage	1	0	0	0	0	NC†

^{†} As Burton was a guest driver, he was ineligible for championship points.

=== NASCAR ===
(key) (Bold – Pole position awarded by qualifying time. Italics – Pole position earned by points standings or practice time. * – Most laps led.)

==== Cup Series ====
NASCAR Cup Series results
Year	Team	No.	Make	1	2	3	4	5	6	7	8	9	10	11	12	13	14	15	16	17	18	19	20	21	22	23	24	25	26	27	28	29	30	31	32	33	34	35	36	NCSC	Pts	Ref
2021	Gaunt Brothers Racing	96	Toyota	DAY	DRC	HOM	LVS	PHO	ATL	BRD	MAR	RCH	TAL; 20	KAN	DAR	DOV	COA	CLT	SON	NSH	POC	POC	ROA	ATL	NHA	GLN	IRC	MCH	DAY	DAR	RCH	BRI	LVS	TAL	ROV	TEX	KAN	MAR	PHO	51st	0^{1}	
2022	Wood Brothers Racing	21	Ford	DAY; 39	CAL; 33	LVS; 16	PHO; 29	ATL; 25	COA; 17	RCH; 18	MAR; 26	BRD; 20	TAL; 34	DOV; 24	DAR; 14	KAN; 21	CLT; 11	GTW; 25	SON; 28	NSH; 25	ROA; 22	ATL; 10	NHA; 26	POC; 23	IRC; 3	MCH; 32	RCH; 25	GLN; 28	DAY; 19	DAR; 21	KAN; 32	BRI; 16	TEX; 18	TAL; 36	ROV; 28	LVS; 26	HOM; 20	MAR; 11	PHO; 19	27th	573	
2023	Wood Brothers Racing	21	Ford	DAY; 26	CAL; 15	LVS; 26	PHO; 35	ATL; 34	COA; 22	RCH; 19	BRD; 15	MAR; 29	TAL; 36	DOV; 20	KAN; 30	DAR; 6	CLT; 18	GTW; 23	SON; 27	NSH; 27	CSC; 30	ATL; 28	NHA; 20	POC; 8	RCH; 31	MCH; 17	IRC; 21	GLN; 33	DAY; 28	DAR; 35	KAN; 35	BRI; 28	TEX; 20	TAL; 31	ROV; 24	LVS; 20	HOM; 36	MAR; 15	PHO; 26	31st	452	
2024	Wood Brothers Racing	21	Ford	DAY; 39	ATL; 11	LVS; 30	PHO; 27	BRI; 32	COA; 30	RCH; 34	MAR; 33	TEX; 28	TAL; 10	DOV; 26	KAN; 36	DAR; 22	CLT; 32	GTW; 31	SON; 25	IOW; 20	NHA; 14	NSH; 28	CSC; 25	POC; 31	IND; 36	RCH; 32	MCH; 14	DAY; 1	DAR; 21	ATL; 31	GLN; 24	BRI; 35	KAN; 23	TAL; 34	ROV; 20	LVS; 15	HOM; 24	MAR; 36	PHO; 16	16th	2122	
2026	23XI Racing	35	Toyota	DAY	ATL	COA	PHO	LVS	DAR	MAR	BRI	KAN	TAL	TEX	GLN	CLT	NSH	MCH	POC	COR	SON	CHI	ATL	NWS	IND	IOW	RCH	NHA	DAY; 12	DAR	GTW	BRI	KAN	LVS	CLT	PHO	TAL	MAR	HOM	43rd	0^{1}	

===== Daytona 500 =====
Year	Team	Manufacturer	Start	Finish
2022	Wood Brothers Racing	Ford	8	39
2023	Wood Brothers Racing	Ford	19	26
2024	Wood Brothers Racing	Ford	12	39

==== O'Reilly Auto Parts Series ====
NASCAR O'Reilly Auto Parts Series results
Year	Team	No.	Make	1	2	3	4	5	6	7	8	9	10	11	12	13	14	15	16	17	18	19	20	21	22	23	24	25	26	27	28	29	30	31	32	33	NOAPSC	Pts	Ref
2019	Joe Gibbs Racing	18	Toyota	DAY	ATL	LVS	PHO	CAL	TEX	BRI; 10	RCH	TAL	DOV	CLT	POC	MCH	IOW; 4	CHI	DAY	KEN	NHA; 29	IOW	GLN	MOH	BRI	ROA	DAR	IND	LVS	RCH; 6	ROV; 13	DOV; 38	KAN; 34	TEX; 7	PHO	HOM; 10	85th	0^{1}	
2020	Joe Gibbs Racing	20	Toyota	DAY; 2	LVS; 5	CAL; 1	PHO; 2	DAR; 9	CLT; 9	BRI; 4	ATL; 5	HOM; 1	HOM; 8	TAL; 32	POC; 32	IRC; 25	KEN; 17	KEN; 12	TEX; 4	KAN; 3	ROA; 16	DRC; 8	DOV; 5	DOV; 11	DAY; 5	DAR; 6	RCH; 16	RCH; 4	BRI; 4	LVS; 9	TAL; 23	ROV; 33	KAN; 11	TEX; 1	MAR; 1*	PHO; 6	8th	2248	
2021	Joe Gibbs Racing	20	Toyota	DAY; 3*	DRC; 6	HOM; 39	LVS; 9	PHO; 12	ATL; 3	MAR; 7	TAL; 10	DAR; 11	DOV; 6	COA; 6	CLT; 3	MOH; 38	TEX; 30	NSH; 3	POC; 37	ROA; 5	ATL; 24	NHA; 5	GLN; 5	IRC; 9	MCH; 5	DAY; 9	DAR; 2	RCH; 9	BRI; 7	LVS; 10	TAL; 25	ROV; 15	TEX; 8	KAN; 34	MAR; 20	PHO; 3	8th	2194	
2025	AM Racing	25	Ford	DAY; 6	ATL; 10	COA; 35	PHO; 20	LVS; 8	HOM; 11	MAR; 24	DAR; 13	BRI; 26	CAR; 3	TAL; 8	TEX; 6	CLT; 21	NSH; 12	MXC; 9	POC; 14	ATL; 13	CSC; 13	SON; 21	DOV; 11	IND; 18	IOW; 5	GLN; 10	DAY; 16	PIR; 12	GTW; 22	BRI; 7	KAN; 20	ROV; 34	LVS; 14	TAL; 13	**MAR**; 11	PHO; 11	12th	2163	
2026	Sam Hunt Racing	24	Toyota	DAY; 29	ATL; 35	COA; 29	PHO; 23	LVS; 17	DAR; 22	MAR; 26	CAR; 13	BRI; 17	KAN; 28	TAL; 26	TEX; 22	GLN; 17	DOV; 16	CLT; 38	NSH; 27	POC; 11	COR; 9	SON; 18	CHI; 20	ATL; 38	IND; 18	IOW; 9	DAY; 8	DAR; 20	GTW; 35	BRI; 12	LVS; 14	CLT; 13	PHO; 13	TAL; 24	MAR; 12	HOM; 23	19th	571	

==== Craftsman Truck Series ====
NASCAR Craftsman Truck Series results
Year	Team	No.	Make	1	2	3	4	5	6	7	8	9	10	11	12	13	14	15	16	17	18	19	20	21	22	23	24	25	NCTS	Pts	Ref
2016	Kyle Busch Motorsports	18	Toyota	DAY	ATL	MAR	KAN	DOV	CLT	TEX	IOW	GTW	KEN	ELD	POC	BRI	MCH	MSP	CHI	NHA	LVS	TAL	MAR; 22	TEX	PHO	HOM			66th	16	
2017	Kyle Busch Motorsports	51	Toyota	DAY	ATL	MAR; 13	KAN	CLT	DOV; 13	TEX	GTW	IOW; 11	KEN	ELD; 15	POC	MCH	BRI; 18	MSP	CHI	NHA	LVS	TAL	MAR; 4	TEX	PHO	HOM			29th	162	
2018	Kyle Busch Motorsports	51	Toyota	DAY	ATL	LVS	MAR; 8	DOV; 5	KAN	CLT	TEX	**IOW**; 3	GTW	CHI	KEN	ELD	POC	MCH	BRI	MSP; 13	LVS	TAL	MAR; 8	TEX; 6	PHO; 3*	HOM; 11			18th	277	
2019	Kyle Busch Motorsports	18	Toyota	DAY; 18	ATL; 8	LVS; 5	MAR; 11	TEX; 31	DOV; 3	KAN; 10	CLT; 11	TEX; 5	IOW; 3	GTW; 16	CHI; 4	KEN; 3	POC; 3	ELD; 31	MCH; 11	BRI; 23	MSP; 21	LVS; 9	TAL; 11	MAR; 18	PHO; 7	HOM; 13			12th	707	
2022	David Gilliland Racing	17	Ford	DAY	LVS	ATL	COA	MAR	BRD; 20	DAR	KAN	TEX	CLT	GTW	SON; 12	KNX	NSH	MOH	POC	IRP	RCH	KAN	BRI	TAL	HOM	PHO			94th	0^{1}	
2026	Tricon Garage	5	Toyota	DAY	ATL	STP	DAR	ROC	BRI	TEX	GLN	DOV	CLT	NSH	MCH	COR	LRP	NWS	IRP; 16	RCH	NHA	BRI	KAN	CLT	PHO	TAL	MAR	HOM	112th	0^{1}	

^{*} Season still in progress
^{1} Ineligible for series points

=== ARCA Menards Series ===
(key) (Bold – Pole position awarded by qualifying time. Italics – Pole position earned by points standings or practice time. * – Most laps led.)

ARCA Menards Series results
Year	Team	No.	Make	1	2	3	4	5	6	7	8	9	10	11	12	13	14	15	16	17	18	19	20	AMSC	Pts	Ref
2016	Ranier Racing with MDM	8	Chevy	DAY	NSH	SLM	TAL	TOL	NJM	POC	MCH	MAD	WIN	IOW; 3	IRP	POC	BLN	ISF	DSF	SLM	CHI	KEN	KAN	89th	215	
2017	MDM Motorsports	28	Toyota	DAY	NSH	SLM	TAL	TOL; 1	ELK	POC	MCH	MAD	IOW	IRP	POC	WIN	ISF	ROA	DSF	SLM	CHI	KEN	KAN	73rd	240	
2018	MDM Motorsports	12	Toyota	DAY	NSH; 3	SLM	TAL	TOL; 9	CLT	POC; 1	MCH	MAD	GTW; 3	CHI	IOW; 6	ELK	POC; 4	ISF	BLN	DSF	SLM; 6	IRP; 21	KAN; 2	16th	1840	
2019	Venturini Motorsports	20	Toyota	DAY; 1*	FIF					CLT; 4	POC; 6	MCH	MAD	GTW	CHI; 2	ELK	IOW	POC	ISF	DSF	SLM	IRP	KAN; 12	21st	1240	
2019	Venturini Motorsports	15	Toyota			SLM; 8	TAL	NSH	TOL															21st	1240	

==== K&N Pro Series East ====
NASCAR K&N Pro Series East results
Year	Team	No.	Make	1	2	3	4	5	6	7	8	9	10	11	12	13	14	NKNPSEC	Pts	Ref
2016	HScott Motorsports with Justin Marks	12	Toyota	NSM; 13	MOB; 7	GRE; 15	**BRI**; 23	VIR; 11	DOM; 21	STA; 15	COL; 4	NHA; 7	IOW; 15	GLN; 12	GRE; 9	NJM; 15	DOV; 6	7th	444	
2017	MDM Motorsports	12	Toyota	**NSM**; 4	GRE; 4	**BRI**; 1*	SBO; 5	SBO; 1	MEM; 1	BLN; 6	TMP; 1	NHA; 4	IOW; 4	GLN; 3	LGY; 7	NJM; 3	DOV; 1	1st	593	
2018	MDM Motorsports	12	Toyota	**NSM**; 3	BRI; 2	LGY	SBO	SBO	MEM	NJM	TMP	NHA; 2	IOW	GLN; 9	GTW	NHA	DOV; 5	17th	200	

==== K&N Pro Series West ====
NASCAR K&N Pro Series West results
Year	Car owner	No.	Make	1	2	3	4	5	6	7	8	9	10	11	12	13	NKNPSWC	Pts	Ref
2015	Jeff Burton	12	Toyota	KCR	IRW	TUS	IOW	SHA	SON	SLS	IOW	EVG	CNS	MER	AAS; 11	PHO; 6	32nd	71	

=== CARS Late Model Stock Car Tour ===
(key) (Bold – Pole position awarded by qualifying time. Italics – Pole position earned by points standings or practice time. * – Most laps led. ** – All laps led.)

CARS Late Model Stock Car Tour results
Year	Team	No.	Make	1	2	3	4	5	6	7	8	9	10	11	12	13	14	15	16	CLMSCTC	Pts	Ref
2023	N/A	21	Toyota	SNM	FLC	HCY	ACE	NWS; DNS	LGY	DOM	CRW	HCY	ACE	TCM	WKS	AAS	SBO	TCM	CRW	94th	0	

=== CARS Super Late Model Tour ===
(key)

CARS Super Late Model Tour results
Year	Team	No.	Make	1	2	3	4	5	6	7	8	9	10	11	12	13	CSLMTC	Pts	Ref
2015	Jeff Burton	12	Toyota	SNM; 25	ROU; 18	HCY	SNM; 3	TCM	MMS; 17	ROU; 16	CON; 4	MYB	HCY				16th	116	
2016	Jeff Burton	12	Toyota	SNM; 7	ROU	HCY	TCM										21st	71	
2016	Jeff Burton	12	Chevy					GRE; 8	ROU	CON; 14	MYB	HCY	SNM				21st	71	
2017	Jeff Burton	12	Toyota	CON; 1	DOM	DOM	HCY	HCY	BRI	AND	ROU	TCM	ROU	HCY	CON	SBO	32nd	34	

=== CARS Pro Late Model Tour ===
(key)

CARS Pro Late Model Tour results
Year	Team	No.	Make	1	2	3	4	5	6	7	8	9	10	11	12	13	CPLMTC	Pts	Ref
2025	Rick Ware Racing	51	Ford	AAS	CDL	OCS	ACE	NWS	CRW	HCY	HCY	AND	FLC	SBO; 4	TCM	NWS	47th	38	

Sporting positions
Preceded by Justin Haley	NASCAR K&N Pro Series East Champion; 2017	Succeeded by Tyler Ankrum
