= Fat Boy =

Fat Boy, fatboy or fat boys may refer to:

== Arts, entertainment and media ==
=== Music ===
- Fatboy Slim, an English DJ and musician
- The Fat Boys, an American hip hop trio from Brooklyn, New York
- James Onen a Ugandan DJ a.k.a. Fatboy

=== Albums and songs ===
- Fatboy (album), 1992 album by moe
- "Fat Boy", a 1994 song by Max-A-Million
- "Fat Boy", a 2007 song by Bizarre from Blue Cheese & Coney Island

=== Fiction ===
- Fatboy (EastEnders), fictional character
- Run Fatboy Run, 2007 comedy film
- Fatboy, a play by John Clancy
- Eric Cartman in the television series South Park he is often called "Fatboy" by his friend Kyle Broflovski.

== Products ==
- Harley-Davidson FLSTF Fat Boy, softail-style cruiser motorcycle
- Fatboy, sofa designed by Finnish designer Jukka Setälä
- FatBoy, popular ice cream from Casper's Ice Cream company
- The Fat Boy, model rocket produced by Estes Industries
- The Fat Boy (hamburger) hamburger popular in Winnipeg, Manitoba

== Other ==
- "Fat Boy", one of the victims in the Glasgow Ice Cream Wars

== See also ==
- Fat Man (disambiguation)
  - NB: The names of the Fat Man and Little Boy bombs in particular might be conflated and confused with Fat Boy.
