= Delicious Candy Pickles Factory =

American confectionery company

- Type: Privately held company
- Industry: Food
- Founded: 2014; 12 years ago in Desoto, Texas, U.S.
- Founder: Heather J. Perkins
- Headquarters: Desoto, Texas, United States
- Area served: United States
- Products: Candy Pickles, Chamoy Pickle, Stuffed Pickles
- Website: deliciouscandypicklesfactory.com

Delicious Candy Pickles Factory is an American candy company that sells flavored candy pickles.

The company was founded in 2014 by Heather Perkins and is headquartered in Desoto, Texas. Delicious Candy Pickles Factory has up to 250 candy pickle flavors and has a name in the State Fair of Texas.

== History ==
Delicious Candy Pickles Factory is a family-owned business, founded by Heather Perkins in 2014. The company is based in Desoto, Texas. As of 2022, the company prepares 250 flavors of candy pickles.

== Products and services ==
Their products include Chamoy Pickle, Jolly Green Giant, Unicorn, Tropical Punch Rainbow, Cotton Candy Pickle, Candy Pinata, Lemon Head Crunch, Sweet & Sour Drop, Cherry Popsicle, Birthday Cake, Pineapple Twist, Tropical Punch Rainbow, Chamoy Pickle, Candy Apple Coated Pickle, Crushed Jolly Rancher, Pickles on a Stick, Pickles in a Cup, Chocolate Coated Pickles, and Cotton Candy Pickle.
