= Setälä =

Setälä (Finnish pronunciation: [ˈsetælæ]) is a Finnish surname. Notable people with the surname include:

- Eemil Nestor Setälä (1864–1935), Finnish politician
- Jukka Setälä (born 1967), Finnish designer
- Kai Setälä (1913–2005), Finnish physician and professor
- Päivi Setälä (1943–2014), Finnish historian and professor
- Toivo Aalto-Setälä (1896–1977), Finnish lawyer and politician
