= Birthday cake flavor =

Artificial flavor profile

Birthday cake flavor is an artificial flavor profile which became popular in the 2010s and 2020s for a range of food items. Although birthday cakes come in many flavors, the flavor is meant to mimic white cake with vanilla frosting and rainbow sprinkles, and was influenced by pastry chef confections such as the B'day Cake truffles from Christina Tosi's Milk Bar.

The flavor typically evokes a combination of vanilla, cherry, and almond. To achieve a "creamy" note, food scientists may include chemicals such as delta-lactones, Sulfurol, dimethyl sulfide or ethyl butyrate; the last also imparts an essence of berry. Writing in Slate, Heather Schwedel described the flavor as "so bizarrely artificial that it circles back around to being delightful." Less positively, writer Peg Aloi labeled it "the Axe body spray of food flavoring".

One of the first mass-produced food products labeled as "birthday cake-flavored" was a special edition Oreo cookie produced for the brand's 2012 centennial. Other birthday cake-flavored products include vodka, Cheerios, and ice cream sandwiches.

== Notable birthday cake-flavored products ==
Birthday cake-flavored products from notable brands include:

| Introduced | Product | Category | Manufacturer | Notes | References |
|---|---|---|---|---|---|
| 2010 | America's Birthday Cake ice cream | Ice cream | Baskin-Robbins | 65th anniversary; revived in 2021 | |
| 2012 | Birthday Cake Oreos | Cookie | Mondelez | Limited edition for 100th anniversary | |
| 2013 | Good Humor Birthday Cake Bars | Ice cream | Unilever | | |
| 2014 | Birthday Cake M&M's | Confectionery | Mars Inc. | | |
| 2014 | Party Cake Peeps | Confectionery | Just Born | | |
| 2017 | Birthday Cake Balm Dotcom | Cosmetics | Glossier | Collaboration with Milk Bar | |
| 2018 | 3 Musketeers Birthday Cake | Candy bar | Mars Inc. | Initially exclusive to Walmart | |
| 2024 | Birthday Cake Cappuccino | Beverage | 7-Eleven | Celebrating "60 years of coffee" | |
| 2024 | Baileys Birthday Cake Liqueur | Beverage | Diageo | | |
| 2025 | FatBoy Birthday Cake Sandwich Pops | Ice cream | Casper's Ice Cream | 100th anniversary | |
| 2025 | McFlurry | Soft serve | McDonald's | 30th anniversary of McFlurry; exclusive to Canada | |
| 2026 | Birthday Cake Cheerios | Breakfast cereal | General Mills | Honoring the United States Semiquincentennial | |
