= 2021 Goodyear 400 =

NASCAR Cup Series race

Race details
- Race 12 of 36 in the 2021 NASCAR Cup Series
- Date: May 9, 2021
- Location: Darlington Raceway in Darlington, South Carolina
- Course: Permanent racing facility
- Course length: 1.366 miles (2.198 km)
- Distance: 293 laps, 400.238 mi (644.121 km)
- Average speed: 123.562 miles per hour (198.854 km/h)

Pole position
| Driver | Brad Keselowski | Team Penske |
- Grid positions set by competition-based formula

Most laps led
| Driver | Martin Truex Jr. | Joe Gibbs Racing |
- Laps: 248

Winner
| No. 19 | Martin Truex Jr. | Joe Gibbs Racing |

Television in the United States
- Network: FS1
- Announcers: Mike Joy, Jeff Gordon and Clint Bowyer

Radio in the United States
- Radio: MRN
- Booth announcers: Alex Hayden and Jeff Striegle
- Turn announcers: Dave Moody (1 & 2) and Mike Bagley (3 & 4)

The 2021 Goodyear 400 was a NASCAR Cup Series race was held on May 9, 2021, at Darlington Raceway in Darlington, South Carolina. Contested over 293 laps on the 1.366-mile (2.198 km) egg-shaped oval, it was the 12th race of the 2021 NASCAR Cup Series season, and the 65th running of the race.

== Report ==
=== Background ===
2021 Goodyear 400 program cover

Darlington Raceway is a race track built for NASCAR racing located near Darlington, South Carolina. It is nicknamed "The Lady in Black" and "The Track Too Tough to Tame" by many NASCAR fans and drivers and advertised as "A NASCAR Tradition." It is of a unique, somewhat egg-shaped design, an oval with the ends of very different configurations, a condition which supposedly arose from the proximity of one end of the track to a minnow pond the owner refused to relocate. This situation makes it very challenging for the crews to set up their cars' handling in a way that is effective at both ends.

=== Events leading up to the race ===
When the 2021 NASCAR Cup Series schedule was announced on September 30, 2020, a second race at Darlington was added for May 9, 2021, marking the first time since 2004 that the track had two races on the schedule (the 2020 season, changed by the pandemic, had three races).

On December 11, 2020, Darlington Raceway announced its highly popular NASCAR Throwback weekend would move to the new May 7–9 weekend, effectively making a lineal swap of the two race meetings at the track. On April 14, 2021, longtime NASCAR tire provider Goodyear announced a race sponsorship deal to call the race the Goodyear 400.

== Entry list ==
- (R) denotes rookie driver.
- (i) denotes driver who are ineligible for series driver points.

| No. | Driver | Team | Manufacturer | Sponsor or Throwback |
|---|---|---|---|---|
| 00 | Quin Houff | StarCom Racing | Chevrolet | Bos Klein/RCA – John Andretti's No. 98 paint scheme from 1997. |
| 1 | Kurt Busch | Chip Ganassi Racing | Chevrolet | Monster Energy |
| 2 | Brad Keselowski | Team Penske | Ford | Freightliner Trucks |
| 3 | Austin Dillon | Richard Childress Racing | Chevrolet | Bass Pro Shops – NASCAR Hall of Famer Fireball Roberts' Pontiac paint scheme from 1959. |
| 4 | Kevin Harvick | Stewart-Haas Racing | Ford | Mobil 1 – Harvick's No. 29 GM Goodwrench paint scheme from his Cup debut at Rockingham following the death of Dale Earnhardt in 2001. |
| 5 | Kyle Larson | Hendrick Motorsports | Chevrolet | HendrickCars.com – Scheme paying homage to Larson's first race car. |
| 6 | Ryan Newman | Roush Fenway Racing | Ford | Kohler – Scheme paying homage to Kohler Generators' 1976 SCCA Runoffs win. |
| 7 | Corey LaJoie | Spire Motorsports | Chevrolet | Valvoline – Alan Kulwicki's Zerex Antifreeze paint scheme from 1989. Spire Motorsports has alliance with Hendrick Motorsports, which is currently sponsored by Valvoline. The Valvoline division of Ashland, Inc. acquired Zerex from BASF in 1994, and the entire Valvoline division was spun off in 2017 to its own separate company. |
| 8 | Tyler Reddick | Richard Childress Racing | Chevrolet | Joe Nichols/Quartz Hill Records – Scheme paying homage to Grammy Award winning singer and NASCAR driver Marty Robbins. |
| 9 | Chase Elliott | Hendrick Motorsports | Chevrolet | Hooters – Team manager Brian Whitesell's first NASCAR Cup Series Championship, as a mechanic on the 1992 Championship team whose No. 7 paint scheme is used. Whitesell was a part-time mechanic on the team of Alan Kulwicki. |
| 10 | Aric Almirola | Stewart-Haas Racing | Ford | Smithfield Foods/Winn-Dixie – Mark Martin's No. 60 paint scheme from the 2000 NASCAR Busch Series Texas race that was not televised after rain delays and a request by MTV Networks management. |
| 11 | Denny Hamlin | Joe Gibbs Racing | Toyota | Sport Clips – Slick Johnson's No. 18 Seamless Machine paint scheme from 1983. |
| 12 | Ryan Blaney | Team Penske | Ford | Advance Auto Parts – Scheme paying homage to Blaney's 2010 PASS Series Late Model car. |
| 14 | Chase Briscoe (R) | Stewart-Haas Racing | Ford | HighPoint.com - A. J. Foyt's Copenhagen paint scheme from 1986. |
| 15 | James Davison | Rick Ware Racing | Chevrolet | Strategic Wealth Partners/Smart Sanitizer – Dick Johnson's No. 38 Redkote paint scheme from 1989 (Davison and Johnson are Australians). |
| 17 | Chris Buescher | Roush Fenway Racing | Ford | Fifth Third Bank |
| 18 | Kyle Busch | Joe Gibbs Racing | Toyota | M&M's – 80th anniversary. |
| 19 | Martin Truex Jr. | Joe Gibbs Racing | Toyota | Auto-Owners Insurance matte black (a reference to matte black cars Truex drove for Furniture Row Racing). |
| 20 | Christopher Bell | Joe Gibbs Racing | Toyota | Rheem |
| 21 | Matt DiBenedetto | Wood Brothers Racing | Ford | Menards/Dutch Boy Paint (Alternate sponsor Motorcraft was not scheduled to be the primary sponsor on the car for this weekend; announced on May 28 the team will run the throwback scheme from the 2001 season where Elliott Sadler won the Food City 500 at Bristol during the September race.) |
| 22 | Joey Logano | Team Penske | Ford | Shell – Scheme paying homage to Mario Andretti's first F1 win at Kyalami, South Africa (Shell also sponsors Scuderia Ferrari in F1). |
| 23 | Bubba Wallace | 23XI Racing | Toyota | Root, Inc. – Scheme paying homage to NASCAR Hall of Famer Wendell Scott. |
| 24 | William Byron | Hendrick Motorsports | Chevrolet | Valvoline – Neil Bonnett's No. 75 paint scheme from 1987. |
| 34 | Michael McDowell | Front Row Motorsports | Ford | FR8 Auctions – Bill Elliott's No. 9 Coors paint scheme that won the 1985 Daytona 500. |
| 37 | Ryan Preece | JTG Daugherty Racing | Chevrolet | Velveeta – Crew chief Trent Owens' No. 15 Dickies paint scheme from the 2002 NASCAR Craftsman Truck Series. |
| 38 | Anthony Alfredo (R) | Front Row Motorsports | Ford | We Care/Fr8Auctions – Alan Kulwicki's No. 38 Hardee's paint scheme from 1985. |
| 41 | Cole Custer | Stewart-Haas Racing | Ford | HaasTooling.com – Special Mother's Day paint scheme honoring Margaret Haas, mother of team owner Gene Haas. |
| 42 | Ross Chastain | Chip Ganassi Racing | Chevrolet | McDonald's – Hut Stricklin's No. 27 paint scheme from 1993. |
| 43 | Erik Jones | Richard Petty Motorsports | Chevrolet | STP – Scheme paying tribute to John Andretti's 1999 Goody's Body Pain 500 at Martinsville race-winning car. It was the last win for Petty Enterprises. |
| 47 | Ricky Stenhouse Jr. | JTG Daugherty Racing | Chevrolet | Kroger/Tide – Ricky Craven's No. 32 Tide paint scheme from 2001 to 2004. Among the races won includes this race in 2003. |
| 48 | Alex Bowman | Hendrick Motorsports | Chevrolet | Ally – Scheme paying homage to crew chief Greg Ives' Super Late Model car. |
| 51 | Cody Ware (i) | Petty Ware Racing | Chevrolet | Nurtec ODT – based on Darrell Waltrip Motorsports' No. 17 Exxon Superflo paint scheme used in Xfinity Series races. |
| 52 | Josh Bilicki | Rick Ware Racing | Ford | Insurance King – Lennie Pond's No. 54 Burger King paint scheme from 1979. |
| 53 | J. J. Yeley (i) | Rick Ware Racing | Ford | FatBoy Ice Cream/Tunnel to Towers Foundation |
| 77 | Justin Haley (i) | Spire Motorsports | Chevrolet | Fraternal Order of Eagles – Robert Pressley's Jasper paint scheme from 1999. |
| 78 | B. J. McLeod (i) | Live Fast Motorsports | Ford | Keen Parts/Corvetteparts.net – Scheme paying homage to NASCAR Hall of Famer Joe Weatherly's last win at Darlington in 1963. |
| 99 | Daniel Suárez | Trackhouse Racing Team | Chevrolet | Camping World – 55th anniversary. |
Official entry list

== Qualifying ==
Brad Keselowski was awarded the pole for the race as determined by competition-based formula.

=== Starting Lineup ===
| Pos | No. | Driver | Team | Manufacturer |
|---|---|---|---|---|
| 1 | 2 | Brad Keselowski | Team Penske | Ford |
| 2 | 4 | Kevin Harvick | Stewart-Haas Racing | Ford |
| 3 | 18 | Kyle Busch | Joe Gibbs Racing | Toyota |
| 4 | 19 | Martin Truex Jr. | Joe Gibbs Racing | Toyota |
| 5 | 24 | William Byron | Hendrick Motorsports | Chevrolet |
| 6 | 9 | Chase Elliott | Hendrick Motorsports | Chevrolet |
| 7 | 11 | Denny Hamlin | Joe Gibbs Racing | Toyota |
| 8 | 21 | Matt DiBenedetto | Wood Brothers Racing | Ford |
| 9 | 3 | Austin Dillon | Richard Childress Racing | Chevrolet |
| 10 | 8 | Tyler Reddick | Richard Childress Racing | Chevrolet |
| 11 | 17 | Chris Buescher | Roush Fenway Racing | Ford |
| 12 | 22 | Joey Logano | Team Penske | Ford |
| 13 | 34 | Michael McDowell | Front Row Motorsports | Ford |
| 14 | 5 | Kyle Larson | Hendrick Motorsports | Chevrolet |
| 15 | 99 | Daniel Suárez | Trackhouse Racing Team | Chevrolet |
| 16 | 12 | Ryan Blaney | Team Penske | Ford |
| 17 | 1 | Kurt Busch | Chip Ganassi Racing | Chevrolet |
| 18 | 42 | Ross Chastain | Chip Ganassi Racing | Chevrolet |
| 19 | 48 | Alex Bowman | Hendrick Motorsports | Chevrolet |
| 20 | 6 | Ryan Newman | Roush Fenway Racing | Ford |
| 21 | 20 | Christopher Bell | Joe Gibbs Racing | Toyota |
| 22 | 14 | Chase Briscoe (R) | Stewart-Haas Racing | Ford |
| 23 | 23 | Bubba Wallace | 23XI Racing | Toyota |
| 24 | 41 | Cole Custer | Stewart-Haas Racing | Ford |
| 25 | 38 | Anthony Alfredo (R) | Front Row Motorsports | Ford |
| 26 | 43 | Erik Jones | Richard Petty Motorsports | Chevrolet |
| 27 | 10 | Aric Almirola | Stewart-Haas Racing | Ford |
| 28 | 47 | Ricky Stenhouse Jr. | JTG Daugherty Racing | Chevrolet |
| 29 | 37 | Ryan Preece | JTG Daugherty Racing | Chevrolet |
| 30 | 7 | Corey LaJoie | Spire Motorsports | Chevrolet |
| 31 | 77 | Justin Haley (i) | Spire Motorsports | Chevrolet |
| 32 | 78 | B. J. McLeod (i) | Live Fast Motorsports | Ford |
| 33 | 51 | Cody Ware (i) | Petty Ware Racing | Chevrolet |
| 34 | 53 | J. J. Yeley (i) | Rick Ware Racing | Ford |
| 35 | 00 | Quin Houff | StarCom Racing | Chevrolet |
| 36 | 15 | James Davison | Rick Ware Racing | Chevrolet |
| 37 | 52 | Josh Bilicki | Rick Ware Racing | Ford |
Official starting lineup

== Race ==
=== Stage Results ===
Stage One Laps: 90

| Pos | No | Driver | Team | Manufacturer | Points |
|---|---|---|---|---|---|
| 1 | 19 | Martin Truex Jr. | Joe Gibbs Racing | Toyota | 10 |
| 2 | 11 | Denny Hamlin | Joe Gibbs Racing | Toyota | 9 |
| 3 | 8 | Tyler Reddick | Richard Childress Racing | Chevrolet | 8 |
| 4 | 5 | Kyle Larson | Hendrick Motorsports | Chevrolet | 7 |
| 5 | 4 | Kevin Harvick | Stewart-Haas Racing | Ford | 6 |
| 6 | 22 | Joey Logano | Team Penske | Ford | 5 |
| 7 | 12 | Ryan Blaney | Team Penske | Ford | 4 |
| 8 | 9 | Chase Elliott | Hendrick Motorsports | Chevrolet | 3 |
| 9 | 24 | William Byron | Hendrick Motorsports | Chevrolet | 2 |
| 10 | 48 | Alex Bowman | Hendrick Motorsports | Chevrolet | 1 |
Official stage one results

Stage Two Laps: 95

| Pos | No | Driver | Team | Manufacturer | Points |
|---|---|---|---|---|---|
| 1 | 19 | Martin Truex Jr. | Joe Gibbs Racing | Toyota | 10 |
| 2 | 18 | Kyle Busch | Joe Gibbs Racing | Toyota | 9 |
| 3 | 24 | William Byron | Hendrick Motorsports | Chevrolet | 8 |
| 4 | 11 | Denny Hamlin | Joe Gibbs Racing | Toyota | 7 |
| 5 | 5 | Kyle Larson | Hendrick Motorsports | Chevrolet | 6 |
| 6 | 20 | Christopher Bell | Joe Gibbs Racing | Toyota | 5 |
| 7 | 22 | Joey Logano | Team Penske | Ford | 4 |
| 8 | 8 | Tyler Reddick | Richard Childress Racing | Chevrolet | 3 |
| 9 | 12 | Ryan Blaney | Team Penske | Ford | 2 |
| 10 | 17 | Chris Buescher | Roush Fenway Racing | Ford | 1 |
Official stage two results

=== Final Stage Results ===
Stage Three Laps: 108

| Pos | Grid | No | Driver | Team | Manufacturer | Laps | Points |
|---|---|---|---|---|---|---|---|
| 1 | 4 | 19 | Martin Truex Jr. | Joe Gibbs Racing | Toyota | 293 | 60 |
| 2 | 14 | 5 | Kyle Larson | Hendrick Motorsports | Chevrolet | 293 | 48 |
| 3 | 3 | 18 | Kyle Busch | Joe Gibbs Racing | Toyota | 293 | 43 |
| 4 | 5 | 24 | William Byron | Hendrick Motorsports | Chevrolet | 293 | 43 |
| 5 | 7 | 11 | Denny Hamlin | Joe Gibbs Racing | Toyota | 293 | 48 |
| 6 | 2 | 4 | Kevin Harvick | Stewart-Haas Racing | Ford | 293 | 37 |
| 7 | 6 | 9 | Chase Elliott | Hendrick Motorsports | Chevrolet | 293 | 33 |
| 8 | 16 | 12 | Ryan Blaney | Team Penske | Ford | 293 | 35 |
| 9 | 11 | 17 | Chris Buescher | Roush Fenway Racing | Ford | 293 | 29 |
| 10 | 20 | 6 | Ryan Newman | Roush Fenway Racing | Ford | 292 | 27 |
| 11 | 22 | 14 | Chase Briscoe (R) | Stewart-Haas Racing | Ford | 292 | 26 |
| 12 | 10 | 8 | Tyler Reddick | Richard Childress Racing | Chevrolet | 292 | 36 |
| 13 | 12 | 22 | Joey Logano | Team Penske | Ford | 292 | 33 |
| 14 | 21 | 20 | Christopher Bell | Joe Gibbs Racing | Toyota | 292 | 28 |
| 15 | 18 | 42 | Ross Chastain | Chip Ganassi Racing | Chevrolet | 291 | 22 |
| 16 | 9 | 3 | Austin Dillon | Richard Childress Racing | Chevrolet | 291 | 21 |
| 17 | 19 | 48 | Alex Bowman | Hendrick Motorsports | Chevrolet | 291 | 21 |
| 18 | 26 | 43 | Erik Jones | Richard Petty Motorsports | Chevrolet | 291 | 19 |
| 19 | 8 | 21 | Matt DiBenedetto | Wood Brothers Racing | Ford | 290 | 18 |
| 20 | 28 | 47 | Ricky Stenhouse Jr. | JTG Daugherty Racing | Chevrolet | 290 | 17 |
| 21 | 23 | 23 | Bubba Wallace | 23XI Racing | Toyota | 290 | 16 |
| 22 | 30 | 7 | Corey LaJoie | Spire Motorsports | Chevrolet | 290 | 15 |
| 23 | 15 | 99 | Daniel Suárez | Trackhouse Racing Team | Chevrolet | 290 | 14 |
| 24 | 1 | 2 | Brad Keselowski | Team Penske | Ford | 290 | 13 |
| 25 | 29 | 37 | Ryan Preece | JTG Daugherty Racing | Chevrolet | 290 | 12 |
| 26 | 25 | 38 | Anthony Alfredo (R) | Front Row Motorsports | Ford | 289 | 11 |
| 27 | 13 | 34 | Michael McDowell | Front Row Motorsports | Ford | 288 | 10 |
| 28 | 31 | 77 | Justin Haley (i) | Spire Motorsports | Chevrolet | 288 | 0 |
| 29 | 34 | 53 | J. J. Yeley (i) | Rick Ware Racing | Chevrolet | 286 | 0 |
| 30 | 35 | 00 | Quin Houff | StarCom Racing | Chevrolet | 286 | 7 |
| 31 | 36 | 15 | James Davison | Rick Ware Racing | Chevrolet | 286 | 6 |
| 32 | 32 | 78 | B. J. McLeod (i) | Live Fast Motorsports | Ford | 285 | 0 |
| 33 | 37 | 52 | Josh Bilicki | Rick Ware Racing | Ford | 245 | 4 |
| 34 | 33 | 51 | Cody Ware (i) | Petty Ware Racing | Chevrolet | 188 | 0 |
| 35 | 17 | 1 | Kurt Busch | Chip Ganassi Racing | Chevrolet | 106 | 2 |
| 36 | 24 | 41 | Cole Custer | Stewart-Haas Racing | Ford | 97 | 1 |
| 37 | 27 | 10 | Aric Almirola | Stewart-Haas Racing | Ford | 5 | 1 |
Official race results

=== Race statistics ===
- Lead changes: 19 among 10 different drivers
- Cautions/Laps: 6 for 36
- Red flags: 0
- Time of race: 3 hours, 14 minutes and 21 seconds
- Average speed: 123.562 miles per hour (198.854 km/h)

== Media ==
=== Television ===
The race was carried by FS1 in the United States. Mike Joy, five-time Darlington winner Jeff Gordon and Clint Bowyer called the race from the broadcast booth. Jamie Little and Regan Smith handled pit road for the television side. Larry McReynolds provided insight from the Fox Sports studio in Charlotte.

FS1
| Booth announcers | Pit reporters | In-race analyst |
|---|---|---|
| Lap-by-lap: Mike Joy; Color-commentator: Jeff Gordon; Color-commentator: Clint Bowyer | Jamie Little; Regan Smith | Larry McReynolds |

=== Radio ===
MRN had the radio call for the race, which was also simulcast on Sirius XM NASCAR Radio.

MRN Radio
| Booth announcers | Turn announcers | Pit reporters |
|---|---|---|
| Lead announcer: Alex Hayden; Announcer: Jeff Striegle | Turns 1 & 2: Dave Moody; Turns 3 & 4: Mike Bagley | Steve Post; Kim Coon |

== Standings after the race ==
Drivers' Championship standings

| | Pos | Driver | Points |
|---|---|---|---|
| | 1 | Denny Hamlin | 529 |
| | 2 | Martin Truex Jr. | 454 (–75) |
| | 3 | William Byron | 428 (–101) |
| | 4 | Joey Logano | 406 (–123) |
| | 5 | Ryan Blaney | 405 (–124) |
| 3 | 6 | Kyle Larson | 385 (–144) |
| 1 | 7 | Kevin Harvick | 385 (–144) |
| 1 | 8 | Chase Elliott | 382 (–147) |
| 3 | 9 | Brad Keselowski | 379 (–150) |
| | 10 | Kyle Busch | 373 (–156) |
| 1 | 11 | Christopher Bell | 320 (–209) |
| 1 | 12 | Austin Dillon | 316 (–213) |
| 2 | 13 | Chris Buescher | 287 (–242) |
| | 14 | Alex Bowman | 281 (–248) |
| 2 | 15 | Michael McDowell | 278 (–251) |
| 2 | 16 | Tyler Reddick | 268 (–261) |
Official driver's standings

Manufacturers' Championship standings

| Pos | Manufacturer | Points |
|---|---|---|
| 1 | Ford | 428 |
| 2 | Chevrolet | 427 (–1) |
| 3 | Toyota | 422 (–6) |

- Note: Only the first 16 positions are included for the driver standings.
- . – Driver has clinched a position in the NASCAR Cup Series playoffs.

| Previous race: 2021 Buschy McBusch Race 400 | NASCAR Cup Series; 2021 season | Next race: 2021 Drydene 400 |
