= 2021 GEICO 500 =

NASCAR Cup Series race

Race details
- Race 10 of 36 in the 2021 NASCAR Cup Series
- Date: April 25, 2021
- Location: Talladega Superspeedway in Lincoln, Alabama
- Course: Permanent racing facility
- Course length: 2.66 miles (4.28 km)
- Distance: 191 laps, 508.06 mi (817.48 km)
- Scheduled distance: 188 laps, 500.08 mi (804.64 km)
- Average speed: 147.62 miles per hour (237.57 km/h)

Pole position
Driver	Denny Hamlin	Joe Gibbs Racing
- Grid positions set by competition-based formula

Most laps led
Driver	Denny Hamlin	Joe Gibbs Racing
- Laps: 44

Winner
No. 2	Brad Keselowski	Team Penske

Television in the United States
- Network: Fox
- Announcers: Mike Joy, Jeff Gordon and Clint Bowyer
- Nielsen ratings: 2.8/4.7 million

Radio in the United States
- Radio: MRN
- Booth announcers: Alex Hayden and Jeff Striegle
- Turn announcers: Dave Moody (1 & 2), Mike Bagley (Backstretch) and Kurt Becker (3 & 4)

The 2021 GEICO 500 was a NASCAR Cup Series race was held on April 25, 2021, at Talladega Superspeedway in Lincoln, Alabama. Contested over 191 laps – extended from 188 laps due to an overtime finish, on the 2.66 mile (4.28 km) superspeedway, it was the 10th race of the 2021 NASCAR Cup Series season, as well as the second of the four crown jewel races. Brad Keselowski won the race, his 35th career victory, sixth win at Talladega (which tied Jeff Gordon for the second-most victories at the track), and his last win with Team Penske in the No. 2 as he moved to co-own RFK Racing, as well as drive the No. 6 in 2022.

== Report ==
=== Background ===
2021 GEICO 500 program cover

Talladega Superspeedway, the track where the race was held

Talladega Superspeedway, formerly known as Alabama International Motor Speedway, is a motorsports complex located north of Talladega, Alabama. It is located on the former Anniston Air Force Base in the small city of Lincoln. A tri-oval, the track was constructed in 1969 by the International Speedway Corporation, a business controlled by the France family. Talladega is most known for its steep banking. The track currently hosts NASCAR's Cup Series, Xfinity Series and Camping World Truck Series. Talladega is the longest NASCAR oval with a length of 2.66-mile-long (4.28 km) tri-oval like the Daytona International Speedway, which is 2.5-mile-long (4.0 km).

==== Entry list ====
- (R) denotes rookie driver.
- (i) denotes driver who are ineligible for series driver points.

No.	Driver	Team	Manufacturer
00	Quin Houff	StarCom Racing	Chevrolet
1	Kurt Busch	Chip Ganassi Racing	Chevrolet
2	Brad Keselowski	Team Penske	Ford
3	Austin Dillon	Richard Childress Racing	Chevrolet
4	Kevin Harvick	Stewart-Haas Racing	Ford
5	Kyle Larson	Hendrick Motorsports	Chevrolet
6	Ryan Newman	Roush Fenway Racing	Ford
7	Corey LaJoie	Spire Motorsports	Chevrolet
8	Tyler Reddick	Richard Childress Racing	Chevrolet
9	Chase Elliott	Hendrick Motorsports	Chevrolet
10	Aric Almirola	Stewart-Haas Racing	Ford
11	Denny Hamlin	Joe Gibbs Racing	Toyota
12	Ryan Blaney	Team Penske	Ford
14	Chase Briscoe (R)	Stewart-Haas Racing	Ford
15	J. J. Yeley (i)	Rick Ware Racing	Chevrolet
16	Kaz Grala	Kaulig Racing	Chevrolet
17	Chris Buescher	Roush Fenway Racing	Ford
18	Kyle Busch	Joe Gibbs Racing	Toyota
19	Martin Truex Jr.	Joe Gibbs Racing	Toyota
20	Christopher Bell	Joe Gibbs Racing	Toyota
21	Matt DiBenedetto	Wood Brothers Racing	Ford
22	Joey Logano	Team Penske	Ford
23	Bubba Wallace	23XI Racing	Toyota
24	William Byron	Hendrick Motorsports	Chevrolet
28	Joey Gase (i)	Rick Ware Racing	Ford
34	Michael McDowell	Front Row Motorsports	Ford
37	Ryan Preece	JTG Daugherty Racing	Chevrolet
38	Anthony Alfredo (R)	Front Row Motorsports	Ford
41	Cole Custer	Stewart-Haas Racing	Ford
42	Ross Chastain	Chip Ganassi Racing	Chevrolet
43	Erik Jones	Richard Petty Motorsports	Chevrolet
47	Ricky Stenhouse Jr.	JTG Daugherty Racing	Chevrolet
48	Alex Bowman	Hendrick Motorsports	Chevrolet
51	Cody Ware (i)	Petty Ware Racing	Chevrolet
52	Josh Bilicki	Rick Ware Racing	Ford
66	Timmy Hill (i)	MBM Motorsports	Ford
77	Justin Haley (i)	Spire Motorsports	Chevrolet
78	B. J. McLeod (i)	Live Fast Motorsports	Ford
96	Harrison Burton (i)	Gaunt Brothers Racing	Toyota
99	Daniel Suárez	Trackhouse Racing Team	Chevrolet
Official entry list

== Qualifying ==
Denny Hamlin was awarded the pole for the race as determined by competition-based formula.

=== Starting Lineup ===
Pos	No.	Driver	Team	Manufacturer
1	11	Denny Hamlin	Joe Gibbs Racing	Toyota
2	22	Joey Logano	Team Penske	Ford
3	19	Martin Truex Jr.	Joe Gibbs Racing	Toyota
4	48	Alex Bowman	Hendrick Motorsports	Chevrolet
5	24	William Byron	Hendrick Motorsports	Chevrolet
6	20	Christopher Bell	Joe Gibbs Racing	Toyota
7	12	Ryan Blaney	Team Penske	Ford
8	9	Chase Elliott	Hendrick Motorsports	Chevrolet
9	18	Kyle Busch	Joe Gibbs Racing	Toyota
10	2	Brad Keselowski	Team Penske	Ford
11	3	Austin Dillon	Richard Childress Racing	Chevrolet
12	5	Kyle Larson	Hendrick Motorsports	Chevrolet
13	21	Matt DiBenedetto	Wood Brothers Racing	Ford
14	10	Aric Almirola	Stewart-Haas Racing	Ford
15	1	Kurt Busch	Chip Ganassi Racing	Chevrolet
16	4	Kevin Harvick	Stewart-Haas Racing	Ford
17	47	Ricky Stenhouse Jr.	JTG Daugherty Racing	Chevrolet
18	42	Ross Chastain	Chip Ganassi Racing	Chevrolet
19	99	Daniel Suárez	Trackhouse Racing Team	Chevrolet
20	8	Tyler Reddick	Richard Childress Racing	Chevrolet
21	17	Chris Buescher	Roush Fenway Racing	Ford
22	43	Erik Jones	Richard Petty Motorsports	Chevrolet
23	34	Michael McDowell	Front Row Motorsports	Ford
24	23	Bubba Wallace	23XI Racing	Toyota
25	14	Chase Briscoe (R)	Stewart-Haas Racing	Ford
26	7	Corey LaJoie	Spire Motorsports	Chevrolet
27	41	Cole Custer	Stewart-Haas Racing	Ford
28	6	Ryan Newman	Roush Fenway Racing	Ford
29	37	Ryan Preece	JTG Daugherty Racing	Chevrolet
30	38	Anthony Alfredo (R)	Front Row Motorsports	Ford
31	78	B. J. McLeod (i)	Live Fast Motorsports	Ford
32	00	Quin Houff	StarCom Racing	Chevrolet
33	51	Cody Ware (i)	Petty Ware Racing	Chevrolet
34	77	Justin Haley (i)	Spire Motorsports	Chevrolet
35	28	Joey Gase (i)	Rick Ware Racing	Ford
36	52	Josh Bilicki	Rick Ware Racing	Ford
37	15	J. J. Yeley (i)	Rick Ware Racing	Chevrolet
38	16	Kaz Grala	Kaulig Racing	Chevrolet
39	96	Harrison Burton (i)	Gaunt Brothers Racing	Toyota
40	66	Timmy Hill (i)	MBM Motorsports	Ford
Official starting lineup

== Race ==
=== Stage Results ===
Stage One Laps: 60

Pos	No	Driver	Team	Manufacturer	Points
1	21	Matt DiBenedetto	Wood Brothers Racing	Ford	10
2	12	Ryan Blaney	Team Penske	Ford	9
3	9	Chase Elliott	Hendrick Motorsports	Chevrolet	8
4	11	Denny Hamlin	Joe Gibbs Racing	Toyota	7
5	24	William Byron	Hendrick Motorsports	Chevrolet	6
6	17	Chris Buescher	Roush Fenway Racing	Ford	5
7	48	Alex Bowman	Hendrick Motorsports	Chevrolet	4
8	34	Michael McDowell	Front Row Motorsports	Ford	3
9	4	Kevin Harvick	Stewart-Haas Racing	Ford	2
10	20	Christopher Bell	Joe Gibbs Racing	Toyota	1
Official stage one results

Stage Two Laps: 60

Pos	No	Driver	Team	Manufacturer	Points
1	23	Bubba Wallace	23XI Racing	Toyota	10
2	2	Brad Keselowski	Team Penske	Ford	9
3	34	Michael McDowell	Front Row Motorsports	Ford	8
4	18	Kyle Busch	Joe Gibbs Racing	Toyota	7
5	37	Ryan Preece	JTG Daugherty Racing	Chevrolet	6
6	12	Ryan Blaney	Team Penske	Ford	5
7	17	Chris Buescher	Roush Fenway Racing	Ford	4
8	47	Ricky Stenhouse Jr.	JTG Daugherty Racing	Chevrolet	3
9	20	Christopher Bell	Joe Gibbs Racing	Toyota	2
10	96	Harrison Burton (i)	Gaunt Brothers Racing	Toyota	0
Official stage two results

=== Final Stage Results ===
Stage Three Laps: 68

Pos	Grid	No	Driver	Team	Manufacturer	Laps	Points
1	10	2	Brad Keselowski	Team Penske	Ford	191	49
2	4	24	William Byron	Hendrick Motorsports	Chevrolet	191	41
3	23	34	Michael McDowell	Front Row Motorsports	Ford	191	45
4	16	4	Kevin Harvick	Stewart-Haas Racing	Ford	191	35
5	13	21	Matt DiBenedetto	Wood Brothers Racing	Ford	191	42
6	38	16	Kaz Grala	Kaulig Racing	Chevrolet	191	31
7	20	8	Tyler Reddick	Richard Childress Racing	Chevrolet	191	30
8	11	3	Austin Dillon	Richard Childress Racing	Chevrolet	191	29
9	7	12	Ryan Blaney	Team Penske	Ford	191	42
10	27	41	Cole Custer	Stewart-Haas Racing	Ford	191	27
11	25	14	Chase Briscoe (R)	Stewart-Haas Racing	Ford	191	26
12	30	38	Anthony Alfredo (R)	Front Row Motorsports	Ford	191	25
13	28	6	Ryan Newman	Roush Fenway Racing	Ford	191	24
14	29	37	Ryan Preece	JTG Daugherty Racing	Chevrolet	191	29
15	14	10	Aric Almirola	Stewart-Haas Racing	Ford	191	22
16	18	42	Ross Chastain	Chip Ganassi Racing	Chevrolet	191	21
17	6	20	Christopher Bell	Joe Gibbs Racing	Toyota	191	23
18	9	18	Kyle Busch	Joe Gibbs Racing	Toyota	191	26
19	24	23	Bubba Wallace	23XI Racing	Toyota	191	28
20	39	96	Harrison Burton (i)	Gaunt Brothers Racing	Toyota	191	0
21	21	17	Chris Buescher	Roush Fenway Racing	Ford	191	25
22	26	7	Corey LaJoie	Spire Motorsports	Chevrolet	191	15
23	19	99	Daniel Suárez	Trackhouse Racing Team	Chevrolet	191	14
24	8	9	Chase Elliott	Hendrick Motorsports	Chevrolet	191	21
25	31	78	B. J. McLeod (i)	Live Fast Motorsports	Ford	191	0
26	37	15	J. J. Yeley (i)	Rick Ware Racing	Chevrolet	191	0
27	22	43	Erik Jones	Richard Petty Motorsports	Chevrolet	190	10
28	33	51	Cody Ware (i)	Petty Ware Racing	Chevrolet	190	0
29	40	66	Timmy Hill (i)	MBM Motorsports	Ford	190	0
30	34	77	Justin Haley (i)	Spire Motorsports	Chevrolet	190	0
31	3	19	Martin Truex Jr.	Joe Gibbs Racing	Toyota	189	6
32	1	11	Denny Hamlin	Joe Gibbs Racing	Toyota	188	12
33	17	47	Ricky Stenhouse Jr.	JTG Daugherty Racing	Chevrolet	186	7
34	35	28	Joey Gase (i)	Rick Ware Racing	Ford	186	0
35	15	1	Kurt Busch	Chip Ganassi Racing	Chevrolet	185	2
36	36	52	Josh Bilicki	Rick Ware Racing	Ford	180	1
37	32	00	Quin Houff	StarCom Racing	Chevrolet	168	1
38	5	48	Alex Bowman	Hendrick Motorsports	Chevrolet	123	5
39	2	22	Joey Logano	Team Penske	Ford	59	1
40	12	5	Kyle Larson	Hendrick Motorsports	Chevrolet	3	1
Official race results

=== Race statistics ===
- Lead changes: 35 among 17 different drivers
- Cautions/Laps: 7 for 34
- Red flags: 0
- Time of race: 3 hours, 26 minutes and 30 seconds
- Average speed: 147.62 miles per hour (237.57 km/h)

== Media ==
=== Television ===
Fox Sports covered their 21st race at the Talladega Superspeedway. Mike Joy, six-time Talladega winner – and all-time restrictor plate race wins record holder – Jeff Gordon and two-time Talladega winner Clint Bowyer called the race from the broadcast booth. Jamie Little and Regan Smith handled pit road for the television side. Larry McReynolds provided insight from the Fox Sports studio in Charlotte.

Fox
Booth announcers	Pit reporters	In-race analyst
Lap-by-lap: Mike Joy; Color-commentator: Jeff Gordon; Color-commentator: Clint Bowyer	Jamie Little; Regan Smith	Larry McReynolds

=== Radio ===
MRN had the radio call for the race which was also simulcast on Sirius XM NASCAR Radio. Alex Hayden and Jeff Striegle called the race in the booth when the field raced through the tri-oval. Dave Moody called the race from the Sunoco spotters stand outside turn 2 when the field raced through turns 1 and 2. Mike Bagley called the race from a platform inside the backstretch when the field raced down the backstretch. Kurt Becker called the race from the Sunoco spotters stand outside turn 4 when the field races through turns 3 and 4. Steve Post, Dillon Welch and Kim Coon worked pit road for the radio side.

MRN Radio
Booth announcers	Turn announcers	Pit reporters
Lead announcer: Alex Hayden; Announcer: Jeff Striegle	Turns 1 & 2: Dave Moody; Backstretch: Mike Bagley; Turns 3 & 4: Kurt Becker	Steve Post; Kim Coon; Dillon Welch

== Standings after the race ==
Drivers' Championship standings

	Pos	Driver	Points
	1	Denny Hamlin	446
	2	Martin Truex Jr.	359 (−87)
	3	Joey Logano	353 (−93)
	4	William Byron	351 (−95)
	5	Ryan Blaney	346 (−100)
3	6	Brad Keselowski	318 (−128)
1	7	Kevin Harvick	308 (−138)
1	8	Chase Elliott	306 (−140)
3	9	Kyle Larson	300 (−146)
	10	Christopher Bell	280 (−166)
	11	Kyle Busch	271 (−175)
	12	Austin Dillon	268 (−178)
4	13	Michael McDowell	244 (−202)
1	14	Alex Bowman	241 (−205)
1	15	Ricky Stenhouse Jr.	229 (−217)
	16	Chris Buescher	229 (−217)
Official driver's standings

Manufacturers' Championship standings

	Pos	Manufacturer	Points
1	1	Ford	362
1	2	Chevrolet	360 (−2)
	3	Toyota	342 (−20)

- Note: Only the first 16 positions are included for the driver standings.
- . – Driver has clinched a position in the NASCAR Cup Series playoffs.

Previous race: 2021 Toyota Owners 400	NASCAR Cup Series; 2021 season	Next race: 2021 Buschy McBusch Race 400
