= FaTMAN =

The Fife and Tayside Metropolitan Area Network is one of the regional networks that comprise JANET. FaTMAN connects three universities (University of Dundee, University of St Andrews and University of Abertay Dundee) and two colleges (Dundee and Angus College and Fife College) to each other and to the Janet backbone in the east of Scotland. There is also an UoD Fife campus node. The University of Dundee is the Regional Network Operator.

The FaTMAN POPs were replaced by Janet managed POPs in mid 2010.
