= Fatman Mountain =

Mountain in Montana, United States

Coordinates: 48°06′07.0″N 115°58′58.6″W

Fatman Mountain is a summit in Sanders County, Montana, in the United States. With an elevation of 4,039 feet (1,231 m), Fatman Mountain is the 2666th highest summit in the state of Montana.
