= Thin Man =

Thin Man may refer to:

== Arts and entertainment ==
- The Adventures of the Thin Man, (1941–1950), a network radio series
- The Thin Man, a 1933 mystery novel by Dashiell Hammett, also a character in the novel
  - The Thin Man (film) (1934), based on the novel
    - The Thin Man (film series) six films featuring Nick and Nora Charles
  - The Thin Man (TV series) (1957–1959), an NBC TV series based on the novel
- The Thin Man, a character in the 1927 German expressionist film Metropolis
- Thin Man (character), a Marvel Comics character, unrelated to Hammett's novel
- The Thin Man, a character in the Charlie's Angels film series
- Noble "Thin Man" Watts (1926–2004), American blues musician
- Thin Man (band), Chinese punk band
- "Thin Man", a song from the 1996 album Nine Objects of Desire by Suzanne Vega

== Other uses ==
- Thin Man (nuclear bomb), an early nuclear weapon design named after Dashiell Hammett's character
- Thin Man Films, a British film production company
- Thin Man Press, a London-based publisher

== See also ==
- "Ballad of a Thin Man", a 1965 song by Bob Dylan
- Slender Man, a fictional supernatural character that originated as a creepypasta Internet meme in 2009
