= 2021 Blue-Emu Maximum Pain Relief 500 =

NASCAR Cup Series race

Race details
- Race 8 of 36 in the 2021 NASCAR Cup Series
- Date: April 10–11, 2021
- Location: Martinsville Speedway in Ridgeway, Virginia
- Course: Permanent racing facility
- Course length: 0.526 miles (0.847 km)
- Distance: 500 laps, 263 mi (423.5 km)
- Average speed: 67.316 miles per hour (108.335 km/h)

Pole position
Driver	Joey Logano	Team Penske
- Grid positions set by competition-based formula

Most laps led
Driver	Denny Hamlin	Joe Gibbs Racing
- Laps: 276

Winner
No. 19	Martin Truex Jr.	Joe Gibbs Racing

Television in the United States
- Network: FS1
- Announcers: Mike Joy, Jeff Gordon and Clint Bowyer
- Nielsen ratings: 2.299 million

Radio in the United States
- Radio: MRN
- Booth announcers: Alex Hayden and Jeff Striegle
- Turn announcers: Dave Moody (Backstretch)

The 2021 Blue-Emu Maximum Pain Relief 500 was a NASCAR Cup Series race held on April 10 and 11th, 2021, at Martinsville Speedway in Ridgeway, Virginia. Contested over 500 laps on the 0.526 miles (0.847 km) paperclip-shaped short track, it was the eighth race of the 2021 NASCAR Cup Series season.

== Report ==
=== Background ===
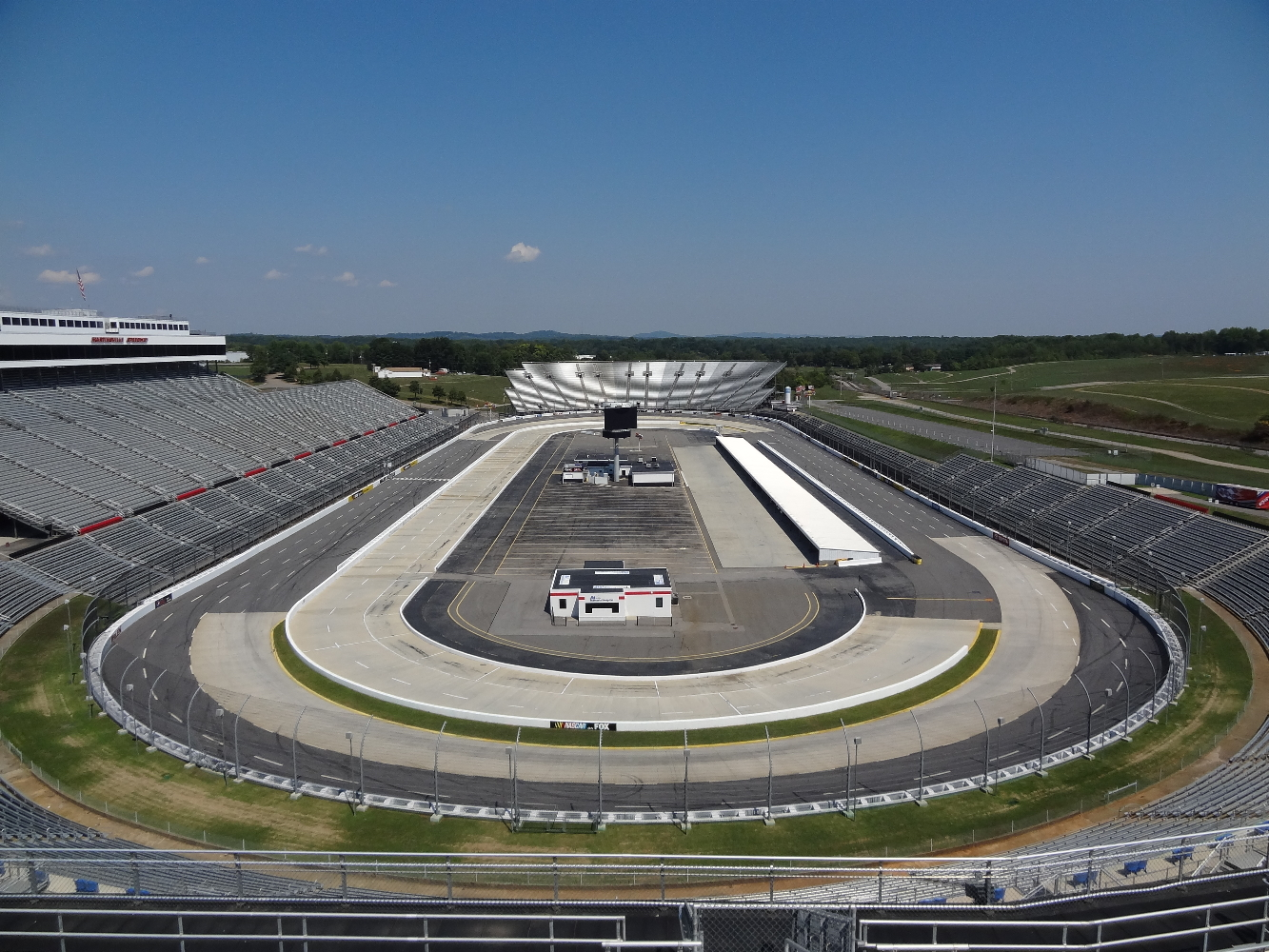
Martinsville Speedway, the track where the race was held.

The 2021 Blue-Emu Maximum Pain Relief 500 program cover.

Martinsville Speedway is a NASCAR-owned stock car racing track located in Henry County, in Ridgeway, Virginia, just to the south of Martinsville. At 0.526 miles (0.847 km) in length, it is the shortest track in the NASCAR Cup Series. The track was also one of the first paved oval tracks in NASCAR, being built in 1947 by H. Clay Earles. It is also the only remaining race track that has been on the NASCAR circuit from its beginning in 1948.

==== Entry list ====
- (R) denotes rookie driver.
- (i) denotes driver who are ineligible for series driver points.

No.	Driver	Team	Manufacturer
00	Quin Houff	StarCom Racing	Chevrolet
1	Kurt Busch	Chip Ganassi Racing	Chevrolet
2	Brad Keselowski	Team Penske	Ford
3	Austin Dillon	Richard Childress Racing	Chevrolet
4	Kevin Harvick	Stewart-Haas Racing	Ford
5	Kyle Larson	Hendrick Motorsports	Chevrolet
6	Ryan Newman	Roush Fenway Racing	Ford
7	Corey LaJoie	Spire Motorsports	Chevrolet
8	Tyler Reddick	Richard Childress Racing	Chevrolet
9	Chase Elliott	Hendrick Motorsports	Chevrolet
10	Aric Almirola	Stewart-Haas Racing	Ford
11	Denny Hamlin	Joe Gibbs Racing	Toyota
12	Ryan Blaney	Team Penske	Ford
14	Chase Briscoe (R)	Stewart-Haas Racing	Ford
15	James Davison	Rick Ware Racing	Chevrolet
17	Chris Buescher	Roush Fenway Racing	Ford
18	Kyle Busch	Joe Gibbs Racing	Toyota
19	Martin Truex Jr.	Joe Gibbs Racing	Toyota
20	Christopher Bell	Joe Gibbs Racing	Toyota
21	Matt DiBenedetto	Wood Brothers Racing	Ford
22	Joey Logano	Team Penske	Ford
23	Bubba Wallace	23XI Racing	Toyota
24	William Byron	Hendrick Motorsports	Chevrolet
34	Michael McDowell	Front Row Motorsports	Ford
37	Ryan Preece	JTG Daugherty Racing	Chevrolet
38	Anthony Alfredo (R)	Front Row Motorsports	Ford
41	Cole Custer	Stewart-Haas Racing	Ford
42	Ross Chastain	Chip Ganassi Racing	Chevrolet
43	Erik Jones	Richard Petty Motorsports	Chevrolet
47	Ricky Stenhouse Jr.	JTG Daugherty Racing	Chevrolet
48	Alex Bowman	Hendrick Motorsports	Chevrolet
51	Cody Ware (i)	Petty Ware Racing	Chevrolet
52	Josh Bilicki	Rick Ware Racing	Ford
53	J. J. Yeley (i)	Rick Ware Racing	Chevrolet
77	Justin Haley (i)	Spire Motorsports	Chevrolet
78	B. J. McLeod (i)	Live Fast Motorsports	Ford
99	Daniel Suárez	Trackhouse Racing Team	Chevrolet
Official entry list

== Qualifying ==
Joey Logano was awarded the pole for the race as determined by competition-based formula.

=== Starting Lineup ===
Pos	No.	Driver	Team	Manufacturer
1	22	Joey Logano	Team Penske	Ford
2	11	Denny Hamlin	Joe Gibbs Racing	Toyota
3	24	William Byron	Hendrick Motorsports	Chevrolet
4	12	Ryan Blaney	Team Penske	Ford
5	9	Chase Elliott	Hendrick Motorsports	Chevrolet
6	47	Ricky Stenhouse Jr.	JTG Daugherty Racing	Chevrolet
7	19	Martin Truex Jr.	Joe Gibbs Racing	Toyota
8	6	Ryan Newman	Roush Fenway Racing	Ford
9	4	Kevin Harvick	Stewart-Haas Racing	Ford
10	2	Brad Keselowski	Team Penske	Ford
11	99	Daniel Suárez	Trackhouse Racing Team	Chevrolet
12	18	Kyle Busch	Joe Gibbs Racing	Toyota
13	8	Tyler Reddick	Richard Childress Racing	Chevrolet
14	34	Michael McDowell	Front Row Motorsports	Ford
15	17	Chris Buescher	Roush Fenway Racing	Ford
16	43	Erik Jones	Richard Petty Motorsports	Chevrolet
17	37	Ryan Preece	JTG Daugherty Racing	Chevrolet
18	3	Austin Dillon	Richard Childress Racing	Chevrolet
19	5	Kyle Larson	Hendrick Motorsports	Chevrolet
20	48	Alex Bowman	Hendrick Motorsports	Chevrolet
21	1	Kurt Busch	Chip Ganassi Racing	Chevrolet
22	21	Matt DiBenedetto	Wood Brothers Racing	Ford
23	20	Christopher Bell	Joe Gibbs Racing	Toyota
24	14	Chase Briscoe (R)	Stewart-Haas Racing	Ford
25	23	Bubba Wallace	23XI Racing	Toyota
26	41	Cole Custer	Stewart-Haas Racing	Ford
27	42	Ross Chastain	Chip Ganassi Racing	Chevrolet
28	53	J. J. Yeley (i)	Rick Ware Racing	Chevrolet
29	00	Quin Houff	StarCom Racing	Chevrolet
30	77	Justin Haley (i)	Spire Motorsports	Chevrolet
31	10	Aric Almirola	Stewart-Haas Racing	Ford
32	51	Cody Ware (i)	Petty Ware Racing	Chevrolet
33	52	Josh Bilicki	Rick Ware Racing	Ford
34	7	Corey LaJoie	Spire Motorsports	Chevrolet
35	38	Anthony Alfredo (R)	Front Row Motorsports	Ford
36	78	B. J. McLeod (i)	Live Fast Motorsports	Ford
37	15	James Davison	Rick Ware Racing	Chevrolet
Official starting lineup

== Race ==
=== Stage Results ===
Stage One Laps: 130

Pos	No	Driver	Team	Manufacturer	Points
1	12	Ryan Blaney	Team Penske	Ford	10
2	11	Denny Hamlin	Joe Gibbs Racing	Toyota	9
3	19	Martin Truex Jr.	Joe Gibbs Racing	Toyota	8
4	9	Chase Elliott	Hendrick Motorsports	Chevrolet	7
5	5	Kyle Larson	Hendrick Motorsports	Chevrolet	6
6	24	William Byron	Hendrick Motorsports	Chevrolet	5
7	48	Alex Bowman	Hendrick Motorsports	Chevrolet	4
8	2	Brad Keselowski	Team Penske	Ford	3
9	22	Joey Logano	Team Penske	Ford	2
10	20	Christopher Bell	Joe Gibbs Racing	Toyota	1
Official stage one results

Stage Two Laps: 130

Pos	No	Driver	Team	Manufacturer	Points
1	12	Ryan Blaney	Team Penske	Ford	10
2	11	Denny Hamlin	Joe Gibbs Racing	Toyota	9
3	19	Martin Truex Jr.	Joe Gibbs Racing	Toyota	8
4	9	Chase Elliott	Hendrick Motorsports	Chevrolet	7
5	48	Alex Bowman	Hendrick Motorsports	Chevrolet	6
6	2	Brad Keselowski	Team Penske	Ford	5
7	24	William Byron	Hendrick Motorsports	Chevrolet	4
8	8	Tyler Reddick	Richard Childress Racing	Chevrolet	3
9	18	Kyle Busch	Joe Gibbs Racing	Toyota	2
10	1	Kurt Busch	Chip Ganassi Racing	Chevrolet	1
Official stage two results

=== Final Stage Results ===
Stage Three Laps: 240

Pos	Grid	No	Driver	Team	Manufacturer	Laps	Points
1	7	19	Martin Truex Jr.	Joe Gibbs Racing	Toyota	500	56
2	5	9	Chase Elliott	Hendrick Motorsports	Chevrolet	500	49
3	2	11	Denny Hamlin	Joe Gibbs Racing	Toyota	500	52
4	3	24	William Byron	Hendrick Motorsports	Chevrolet	500	42
5	19	5	Kyle Larson	Hendrick Motorsports	Chevrolet	500	38
6	1	22	Joey Logano	Team Penske	Ford	500	33
7	23	20	Christopher Bell	Joe Gibbs Racing	Toyota	500	31
8	13	8	Tyler Reddick	Richard Childress Racing	Chevrolet	500	32
9	9	4	Kevin Harvick	Stewart-Haas Racing	Ford	500	28
10	12	18	Kyle Busch	Joe Gibbs Racing	Toyota	500	29
11	4	12	Ryan Blaney	Team Penske	Ford	500	46
12	22	21	Matt DiBenedetto	Wood Brothers Racing	Ford	500	25
13	15	17	Chris Buescher	Roush Fenway Racing	Ford	500	24
14	18	3	Austin Dillon	Richard Childress Racing	Chevrolet	500	23
15	6	47	Ricky Stenhouse Jr.	JTG Daugherty Racing	Chevrolet	500	22
16	25	23	Bubba Wallace	23XI Racing	Toyota	500	21
17	27	42	Ross Chastain	Chip Ganassi Racing	Chevrolet	500	20
18	26	41	Cole Custer	Stewart-Haas Racing	Ford	500	19
19	8	6	Ryan Newman	Roush Fenway Racing	Ford	499	18
20	31	10	Aric Almirola	Stewart-Haas Racing	Ford	499	17
21	21	1	Kurt Busch	Chip Ganassi Racing	Chevrolet	498	17
22	37	15	James Davison	Rick Ware Racing	Chevrolet	494	15
23	33	52	Josh Bilicki	Rick Ware Racing	Ford	493	14
24	29	00	Quin Houff	StarCom Racing	Chevrolet	493	13
25	28	53	J. J. Yeley (i)	Rick Ware Racing	Chevrolet	492	0
26	35	38	Anthony Alfredo (R)	Front Row Motorsports	Ford	492	11
27	24	14	Chase Briscoe (R)	Stewart-Haas Racing	Ford	491	10
28	32	51	Cody Ware (i)	Petty Ware Racing	Chevrolet	490	0
29	36	78	B. J. McLeod	Live Fast Motorsports	Ford	478	0
30	16	43	Erik Jones	Richard Petty Motorsports	Chevrolet	403	7
31	14	34	Michael McDowell	Front Row Motorsports	Ford	387	6
32	11	99	Daniel Suárez	Trackhouse Racing Team	Chevrolet	386	-5
33	10	2	Brad Keselowski	Team Penske	Ford	385	12
34	20	48	Alex Bowman	Hendrick Motorsports	Chevrolet	384	13
35	30	77	Justin Haley (i)	Spire Motorsports	Chevrolet	383	0
36	17	37	Ryan Preece	JTG Daugherty Racing	Chevrolet	382	1
37	34	7	Corey LaJoie	Spire Motorsports	Chevrolet	374	1
Official race results

=== Race statistics ===
- Lead changes: 18 among 7 different drivers
- Cautions/Laps: 15 for 102
- Red flags: 2 for 18 hours, 42 minutes and 31 seconds
- Time of race: 3 hours, 54 minutes and 25 seconds
- Average speed: 67.316 miles per hour (108.335 km/h)

== Media ==
=== Television ===
Fox Sports covered their 21st race at the Martinsville Speedway. Mike Joy, nine-time Martinsville winner Jeff Gordon and 2018 Martinsville winner Clint Bowyer called the race from the broadcast booth. Jamie Little and Regan Smith handled pit road for the television side. Larry McReynolds provided insight from the Fox Sports studio in Charlotte.

FS1
Booth announcers	Pit reporters	In-race analyst
Lap-by-lap: Mike Joy; Color-commentator: Jeff Gordon; Color-commentator: Clint Bowyer	Jamie Little; Regan Smith	Larry McReynolds

=== Radio ===
MRN had the radio call for the race which was also simulcasted on Sirius XM NASCAR Radio. Alex Hayden and Jeff Striegle called the race in the booth as the cars raced down the frontstretch. Dave Moody called the race from atop the turn 3 stands as the field raced down the backstretch. Pit lane was manned by Steve Post and Kim Coon.

MRN
Booth announcers	Turn announcers	Pit reporters
Lead announcer: Alex Hayden; Announcer: Jeff Striegle	Backstretch: Dave Moody	Steve Post; Kim Coon

== Standings after the race ==
Drivers' Championship standings

	Pos	Driver	Points
	1	Denny Hamlin	379
1	2	Martin Truex Jr.	303 (–76)
1	3	Joey Logano	302 (–77)
	4	Kyle Larson	280 (–99)
2	5	Ryan Blaney	272 (–107)
	6	William Byron	270 (–109)
2	7	Chase Elliott	260 (–119)
	8	Kevin Harvick	253 (–126)
2	9	Brad Keselowski	244 (–135)
	10	Christopher Bell	217 (–162)
2	11	Kyle Busch	212 (–167)
1	12	Austin Dillon	209 (–170)
1	13	Ricky Stenhouse Jr.	202 (–177)
3	14	Chris Buescher	192 (–187)
	15	Kurt Busch	190 (–189)
4	16	Michael McDowell	189 (–190)
Official driver's standings

Manufacturers' Championship standings

	Pos	Manufacturer	Points
	1	Ford	288
1	2	Toyota	287 (–1)
1	3	Chevrolet	285 (–3)

- Note: Only the first 16 positions are included for the driver standings.
- . – Driver has clinched a position in the NASCAR Cup Series playoffs.

Previous race: 2021 Food City Dirt Race	NASCAR Cup Series; 2021 season	Next race: 2021 Toyota Owners 400
