= 2021 Toyota Owners 400 =

NASCAR Cup Series race

Race details
- Race 9 of 36 in the 2021 NASCAR Cup Series
- Date: April 18, 2021
- Location: Richmond Raceway in Richmond, Virginia
- Course: Permanent racing facility
- Course length: 0.75 miles (1.2 km)
- Distance: 400 laps, 300 mi (480 km)
- Average speed: 96.282 miles per hour (154.951 km/h)

Pole position
Driver	Martin Truex Jr.	Joe Gibbs Racing
- Grid positions set by competition-based formula

Most laps led
Driver	Denny Hamlin	Joe Gibbs Racing
- Laps: 207

Winner
No. 48	Alex Bowman	Hendrick Motorsports

Television in the United States
- Network: Fox
- Announcers: Mike Joy, Jeff Gordon and Clint Bowyer
- Nielsen ratings: 3.315 million

Radio in the United States
- Radio: MRN
- Booth announcers: Alex Hayden, Jeff Striegle and Rusty Wallace
- Turn announcers: Dave Moody (Backstretch)

The 2021 Toyota Owners 400 was a NASCAR Cup Series race held on April 18, 2021, at Richmond Raceway in Richmond, Virginia. Contested over 400 laps on the 0.75 mile (1.2 km) asphalt short track, it was the ninth race of the 2021 NASCAR Cup Series season.

== Report ==
=== Background ===
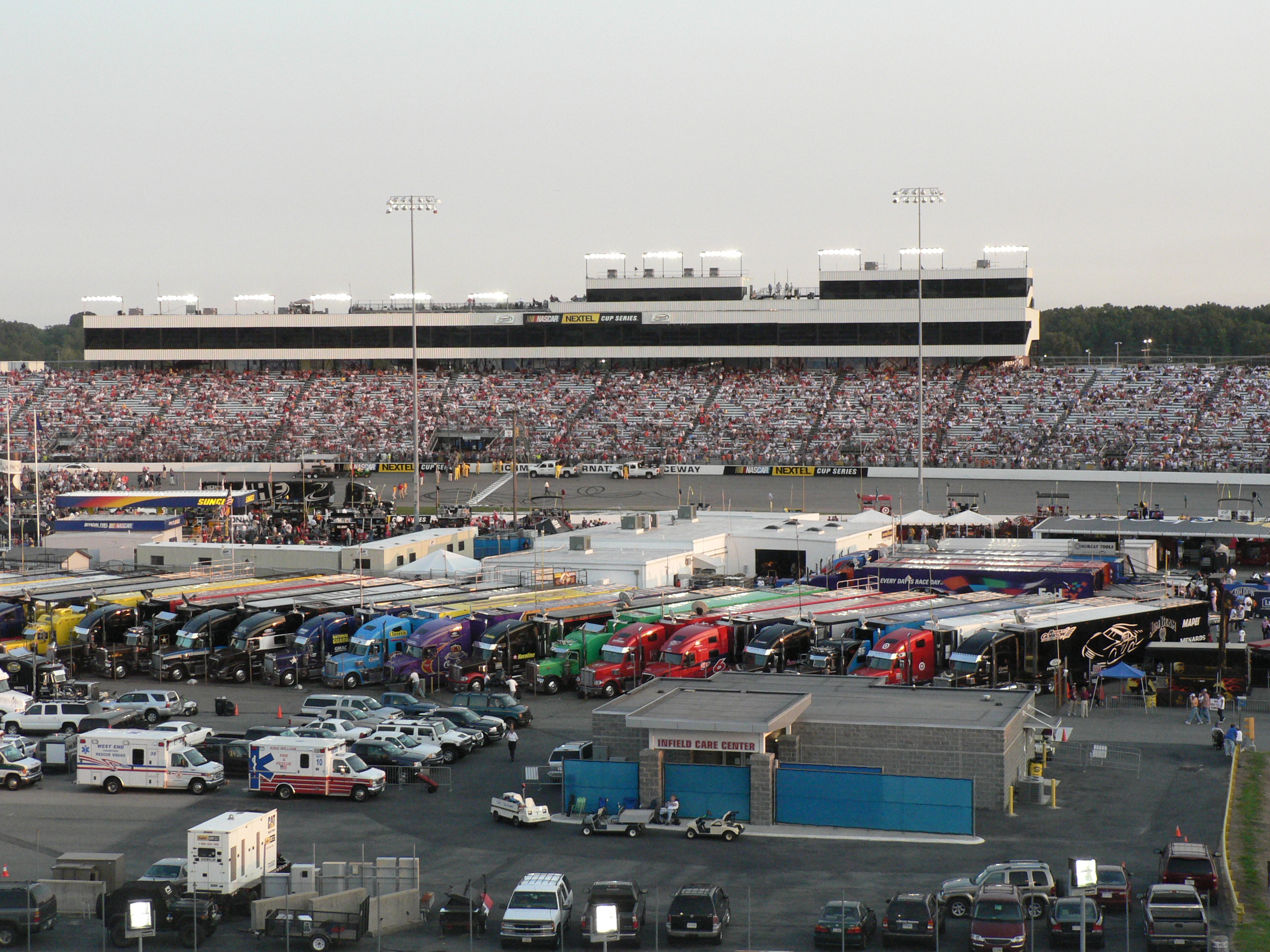
Richmond Raceway, the track where the race was held.

The 2021 Toyota Owners 400 program cover.

Richmond Raceway is a 3/4-mile (1.2 km), D-shaped, asphalt race track located just outside Richmond, Virginia in Henrico County. It hosts the NASCAR Cup Series and Xfinity Series. Known as "America's premier short track", it formerly hosted a NASCAR Camping World Truck Series race, an IndyCar Series race, and two USAC sprint car races.

==== Entry list ====
- (R) denotes rookie driver.
- (i) denotes driver who are ineligible for series driver points.

No.	Driver	Team	Manufacturer
00	Quin Houff	StarCom Racing	Chevrolet
1	Kurt Busch	Chip Ganassi Racing	Chevrolet
2	Brad Keselowski	Team Penske	Ford
3	Austin Dillon	Richard Childress Racing	Chevrolet
4	Kevin Harvick	Stewart-Haas Racing	Ford
5	Kyle Larson	Hendrick Motorsports	Chevrolet
6	Ryan Newman	Roush Fenway Racing	Ford
7	Corey LaJoie	Spire Motorsports	Chevrolet
8	Tyler Reddick	Richard Childress Racing	Chevrolet
9	Chase Elliott	Hendrick Motorsports	Chevrolet
10	Aric Almirola	Stewart-Haas Racing	Ford
11	Denny Hamlin	Joe Gibbs Racing	Toyota
12	Ryan Blaney	Team Penske	Ford
14	Chase Briscoe (R)	Stewart-Haas Racing	Ford
15	James Davison	Rick Ware Racing	Chevrolet
17	Chris Buescher	Roush Fenway Racing	Ford
18	Kyle Busch	Joe Gibbs Racing	Toyota
19	Martin Truex Jr.	Joe Gibbs Racing	Toyota
20	Christopher Bell	Joe Gibbs Racing	Toyota
21	Matt DiBenedetto	Wood Brothers Racing	Ford
22	Joey Logano	Team Penske	Ford
23	Bubba Wallace	23XI Racing	Toyota
24	William Byron	Hendrick Motorsports	Chevrolet
33	Austin Cindric (i)	Team Penske	Ford
34	Michael McDowell	Front Row Motorsports	Ford
37	Ryan Preece	JTG Daugherty Racing	Chevrolet
38	Anthony Alfredo (R)	Front Row Motorsports	Ford
41	Cole Custer	Stewart-Haas Racing	Ford
42	Ross Chastain	Chip Ganassi Racing	Chevrolet
43	Erik Jones	Richard Petty Motorsports	Chevrolet
47	Ricky Stenhouse Jr.	JTG Daugherty Racing	Chevrolet
48	Alex Bowman	Hendrick Motorsports	Chevrolet
51	Cody Ware (i)	Petty Ware Racing	Chevrolet
52	Josh Bilicki	Rick Ware Racing	Ford
53	Garrett Smithley (i)	Rick Ware Racing	Chevrolet
77	Justin Haley (i)	Spire Motorsports	Chevrolet
78	B. J. McLeod (i)	Live Fast Motorsports	Ford
99	Daniel Suárez	Trackhouse Racing Team	Chevrolet
Official entry list

== Qualifying ==
Martin Truex Jr. was awarded the pole for the race as determined by competition-based formula.

=== Starting Lineup ===
Pos	No.	Driver	Team	Manufacturer
1	19	Martin Truex Jr.	Joe Gibbs Racing	Toyota
2	11	Denny Hamlin	Joe Gibbs Racing	Toyota
3	9	Chase Elliott	Hendrick Motorsports	Chevrolet
4	24	William Byron	Hendrick Motorsports	Chevrolet
5	22	Joey Logano	Team Penske	Ford
6	5	Kyle Larson	Hendrick Motorsports	Chevrolet
7	12	Ryan Blaney	Team Penske	Ford
8	20	Christopher Bell	Joe Gibbs Racing	Toyota
9	4	Kevin Harvick	Stewart-Haas Racing	Ford
10	18	Kyle Busch	Joe Gibbs Racing	Toyota
11	3	Austin Dillon	Richard Childress Racing	Chevrolet
12	17	Chris Buescher	Roush Fenway Racing	Ford
13	8	Tyler Reddick	Richard Childress Racing	Chevrolet
14	47	Ricky Stenhouse Jr.	JTG Daugherty Racing	Chevrolet
15	23	Bubba Wallace	23XI Racing	Toyota
16	21	Matt DiBenedetto	Wood Brothers Racing	Ford
17	1	Kurt Busch	Chip Ganassi Racing	Chevrolet
18	42	Ross Chastain	Chip Ganassi Racing	Chevrolet
19	6	Ryan Newman	Roush Fenway Racing	Ford
20	2	Brad Keselowski	Team Penske	Ford
21	41	Cole Custer	Stewart-Haas Racing	Ford
22	10	Aric Almirola	Stewart-Haas Racing	Ford
23	34	Michael McDowell	Front Row Motorsports	Ford
24	48	Alex Bowman	Hendrick Motorsports	Chevrolet
25	37	Ryan Preece	JTG Daugherty Racing	Chevrolet
26	14	Chase Briscoe (R)	Stewart-Haas Racing	Ford
27	99	Daniel Suárez	Trackhouse Racing Team	Chevrolet
28	15	James Davison	Rick Ware Racing	Chevrolet
29	38	Anthony Alfredo (R)	Front Row Motorsports	Ford
30	43	Erik Jones	Richard Petty Motorsports	Chevrolet
31	52	Josh Bilicki	Rick Ware Racing	Ford
32	00	Quin Houff	StarCom Racing	Chevrolet
33	51	Cody Ware (i)	Petty Ware Racing	Chevrolet
34	77	Justin Haley (i)	Spire Motorsports	Chevrolet
35	78	B. J. McLeod (i)	Live Fast Motorsports	Ford
36	7	Corey LaJoie	Spire Motorsports	Chevrolet
37	53	Garrett Smithley (i)	Rick Ware Racing	Chevrolet
38	33	Austin Cindric (i)	Team Penske	Ford
Official starting lineup

== Race ==
=== Stage Results ===
Stage One Laps: 80

Pos	No	Driver	Team	Manufacturer	Points
1	11	Denny Hamlin	Joe Gibbs Racing	Toyota	10
2	19	Martin Truex Jr.	Joe Gibbs Racing	Toyota	9
3	22	Joey Logano	Team Penske	Ford	8
4	24	William Byron	Hendrick Motorsports	Chevrolet	7
5	12	Ryan Blaney	Team Penske	Ford	6
6	20	Christopher Bell	Joe Gibbs Racing	Toyota	5
7	48	Alex Bowman	Hendrick Motorsports	Chevrolet	4
8	3	Austin Dillon	Richard Childress Racing	Chevrolet	3
9	2	Brad Keselowski	Team Penske	Ford	2
10	4	Kevin Harvick	Stewart-Haas Racing	Ford	1
Official stage one results

Stage Two Laps: 155

Pos	No	Driver	Team	Manufacturer	Points
1	11	Denny Hamlin	Joe Gibbs Racing	Toyota	10
2	19	Martin Truex Jr.	Joe Gibbs Racing	Toyota	9
3	22	Joey Logano	Team Penske	Ford	8
4	48	Alex Bowman	Hendrick Motorsports	Chevrolet	7
5	4	Kevin Harvick	Stewart-Haas Racing	Ford	6
6	21	Matt DiBenedetto	Wood Brothers Racing	Ford	5
7	18	Kyle Busch	Joe Gibbs Racing	Toyota	4
8	24	William Byron	Hendrick Motorsports	Chevrolet	3
9	20	Christopher Bell	Joe Gibbs Racing	Toyota	2
10	10	Aric Almirola	Stewart-Haas Racing	Ford	1
Official stage two results

=== Final Stage Results ===
Stage Three Laps: 165

Pos	Grid	No	Driver	Team	Manufacturer	Laps	Points
1	24	48	Alex Bowman	Hendrick Motorsports	Chevrolet	400	51
2	2	11	Denny Hamlin	Joe Gibbs Racing	Toyota	400	55
3	5	22	Joey Logano	Team Penske	Ford	400	50
4	8	20	Christopher Bell	Joe Gibbs Racing	Toyota	400	40
5	1	19	Martin Truex Jr.	Joe Gibbs Racing	Toyota	400	50
6	22	10	Aric Almirola	Stewart-Haas Racing	Ford	400	32
7	4	24	William Byron	Hendrick Motorsports	Chevrolet	400	40
8	10	18	Kyle Busch	Joe Gibbs Racing	Toyota	400	33
9	16	21	Matt DiBenedetto	Wood Brothers Racing	Ford	400	33
10	11	3	Austin Dillon	Richard Childress Racing	Chevrolet	400	30
11	7	12	Ryan Blaney	Team Penske	Ford	400	32
12	3	9	Chase Elliott	Hendrick Motorsports	Chevrolet	400	25
13	17	1	Kurt Busch	Chip Ganassi Racing	Chevrolet	400	24
14	20	2	Brad Keselowski	Team Penske	Ford	400	25
15	18	42	Ross Chastain	Chip Ganassi Racing	Chevrolet	399	22
16	27	99	Daniel Suárez	Trackhouse Racing Team	Chevrolet	399	21
17	14	47	Ricky Stenhouse Jr.	JTG Daugherty Racing	Chevrolet	399	20
18	6	5	Kyle Larson	Hendrick Motorsports	Chevrolet	398	19
19	30	43	Erik Jones	Richard Petty Motorsports	Chevrolet	398	18
20	13	8	Tyler Reddick	Richard Childress Racing	Chevrolet	398	17
21	36	7	Corey LaJoie	Spire Motorsports	Chevrolet	398	16
22	26	14	Chase Briscoe (R)	Stewart-Haas Racing	Ford	398	15
23	21	41	Cole Custer	Stewart-Haas Racing	Ford	398	14
24	9	4	Kevin Harvick	Stewart-Haas Racing	Ford	397	20
25	12	17	Chris Buescher	Roush Fenway Racing	Ford	397	12
26	15	23	Bubba Wallace	23XI Racing	Toyota	397	11
27	23	34	Michael McDowell	Front Row Motorsports	Ford	396	10
28	38	33	Austin Cindric (i)	Team Penske	Ford	396	0
29	25	37	Ryan Preece	JTG Daugherty Racing	Chevrolet	396	8
30	19	6	Ryan Newman	Roush Fenway Racing	Ford	395	7
31	29	38	Anthony Alfredo (R)	Front Row Motorsports	Ford	395	6
32	35	78	B. J. McLeod (i)	Live Fast Motorsports	Ford	393	0
33	28	15	James Davison	Rick Ware Racing	Chevrolet	390	4
34	32	00	Quin Houff	StarCom Racing	Chevrolet	390	3
35	37	53	Garrett Smithley (i)	Rick Ware Racing	Chevrolet	389	0
36	33	51	Cody Ware (i)	Petty Ware Racing	Chevrolet	385	0
37	31	52	Josh Bilicki	Rick Ware Racing	Ford	384	1
38	34	77	Justin Haley (i)	Spire Motorsports	Chevrolet	1	0
Official race results

=== Race statistics ===
- Lead changes: 20 among 7 different drivers
- Cautions/Laps: 5 for 39
- Red flags: 0
- Time of race: 3 hours, 6 minutes and 57 seconds
- Average speed: 96.282 miles per hour (154.951 km/h)

== Media ==
=== Television ===
Fox Sports covered their 20th race at the Richmond Raceway. Mike Joy, two-time Richmond winners Jeff Gordon and Clint Bowyer called the race from the broadcast booth. Jamie Little and Regan Smith handled pit road for the television side. Larry McReynolds provided insight from the Fox Sports studio in Charlotte.

Fox
Booth announcers	Pit reporters	In-race analyst
Lap-by-lap: Mike Joy; Color-commentator: Jeff Gordon; Color-commentator: Clint Bowyer	Jamie Little; Regan Smith	Larry McReynolds

=== Radio ===
MRN had the radio call for the race which was simulcasted on Sirius XM NASCAR Radio. Alex Hayden, Jeff Striegle and Rusty Wallace called the race in the booth when the field raced down the frontstretch. Dave Moody called the race from a platform inside the backstretch when the field races down the backstretch. Steve Post and Jason Toy worked pit road for the radio side.

MRN
Booth announcers	Turn announcers	Pit reporters
Lead announcer: Alex Hayden; Announcer: Jeff Striegle; Announcer: Rusty Wallace	Backstretch: Dave Moody	Steve Post; Jason Toy

== Standings after the race ==
Drivers' Championship standings

	Pos	Driver	Points
	1	Denny Hamlin	434
	2	Martin Truex Jr.	353 (–81)
	3	Joey Logano	352 (–82)
2	4	William Byron	310 (–124)
	5	Ryan Blaney	304 (–130)
2	6	Kyle Larson	299 (–135)
	7	Chase Elliott	285 (–149)
	8	Kevin Harvick	273 (–161)
	9	Brad Keselowski	269 (–165)
	10	Christopher Bell	257 (–177)
	11	Kyle Busch	245 (–189)
	12	Austin Dillon	239 (–195)
4	13	Alex Bowman	236 (–198)
1	14	Ricky Stenhouse Jr.	222 (–212)
	15	Kurt Busch	214 (–220)
2	16	Chris Buescher	204 (–230)
Official driver's standings

Manufacturers' Championship standings

	Pos	Manufacturer	Points
2	1	Chevrolet	325
1	2	Ford	322 (–3)
1	3	Toyota	322 (–3)

- Note: Only the first 16 positions are included for the driver standings.
- . – Driver has clinched a position in the NASCAR Cup Series playoffs.

Previous race: 2021 Blue-Emu Maximum Pain Relief 500	NASCAR Cup Series; 2021 season	Next race: 2021 GEICO 500
