= The Adventures of Fatman =

2003 video game

- Developer(s): SOCKO! Entertainment
- Publisher(s): SOCKO! Entertainment
- Composer(s): Mark Lovegrove
- Engine: Adventure Game Studio
- Platform(s): Windows
- Release: May 2003
- Genre(s): Point-and-click adventure
- Mode(s): Single-player

The Adventures of Fatman is a point and click adventure for Microsoft Windows released in 2003.

== Gameplay ==
The game consists of the user playing as the eponymous Fatman, superhero protector of Shadowlawn, investigating an explosion at the ACNE chemical plant, and how exactly the CEO of Mary & Kate cosmetics was involved. The villain of the game is Toxicman, a mutated thug who has a power to transform others into zombies. The game features over 30 locations, and over 20 characters with 1,000 fully recorded lines of dialogue, with an original score featuring over fifty tracks. The game also enables you to listen to an "Audio Commentary" while playing, for every location.

== Development ==
The Adventures of Fatman was created by U.S. independent studio SOCKO! Entertainment and released in May 2003. The game was designed by Michael Doak and produced using the popular freeware game creation software the Adventure Game Studio. Fatman was originally released as an independent commercial game. When Socko! Entertainment closed down in late 2003 they released the game under the freely distributed Creative Commons license (Attribution-NonCommercial-NoDerivatives) as "Abandonware". In October 2015 the game was rereleased on Steam.

== Reception ==
The game received mostly favourable reviews. It received a DIY Games award for 'Adventure game of the year', and 'Excellence in music', and was nominated for 'Overall game of the year'. It also won two AGS Awards.
