= Jukka Setälä =

Finnish designer (born 1967)

Jukka Setala (born 24 February 1967, Helsinki, Finland) is a Finnish designer. He completed his study as an interior architect at the University of Art and Design Helsinki in 1996. He designed a notable lamp but he is best known for his "Fatboy" beanbag chairs.

== Exhibitions ==
- 2004 'Muovi' (Plastic), Design Museum, Helsinki
- 2004 'Dream Team' design exhibition / Design Forum, Helsinki
- 2002 'Finndesignnow02' / Helsinki
- 2000 '100- (design-)' / Helsinki
- 2000 'Young Forum' / Design Forum, Helsinki
- 1999 'Artificial Nature', furniture exhibition Pit 21, Milan
- 1999 'New Scandinavian' furniture exhibition / Cologne
- 1998 'Finnish Design 10' / Design Forum, Helsinki
- 1997 '25-Points' furniture exhibition / MUOVA, Vaasa, and Suomenlinna, Helsinki
- 1997 'Young Designers Week', furniture exhibition / Martela, Helsinki
- 1997 'Talente 1997' / Munich
- 1997 'Borens Award 1996' / Design Forum, Helsinki and Malmö Form & Design Center
- 1996 'Nordisk Glass', Malmö Form & Design Center
- 1996 'Young Forum' / Design Forum, Helsinki
- 1996 'The Forces of Light' / Rake Gallery, Helsinki
- 1995 'Giovani e Materia' / Firenze
- 1994 '4' / NuKu Galleria, Oulu
- 1994 Jewellery exhibition / Gallery PUR-PUR, Frankfurt am Main
- 1993 Furniture Exhibition / Copenhagen
- 1991 Retretti, sculpture exhibition / Punkaharju

== Acknowledgements and awards ==
- 2006 Best New Furniture in Europe 2006 / Reader's Digest, Europe
- 2001 Merket for God Design
- 1999 Honorary mention 'Valo-99' (Light 99) / light design competition, Finland
- 1995 Coats Opti Oy, 1st prize / design competition, Finland
- 1994 Stala Oy, Harjavalta Oy, Naber & Co Oy, design competition, 3rd prize with Ilkka Koskela / Finland
- 1993 Jorvas High-Tech centre, graphic design, 1st prize / Finland
- Own design office since 1996 under the name Suunnittelu- and Muotoilutoimisto Jukka Setälä Oy
- Furniture design teacher at the University Of Art And Design Helsinki since 1999
