= Casper's Ice Cream =

American ice cream company

Casper's Ice Cream Inc.
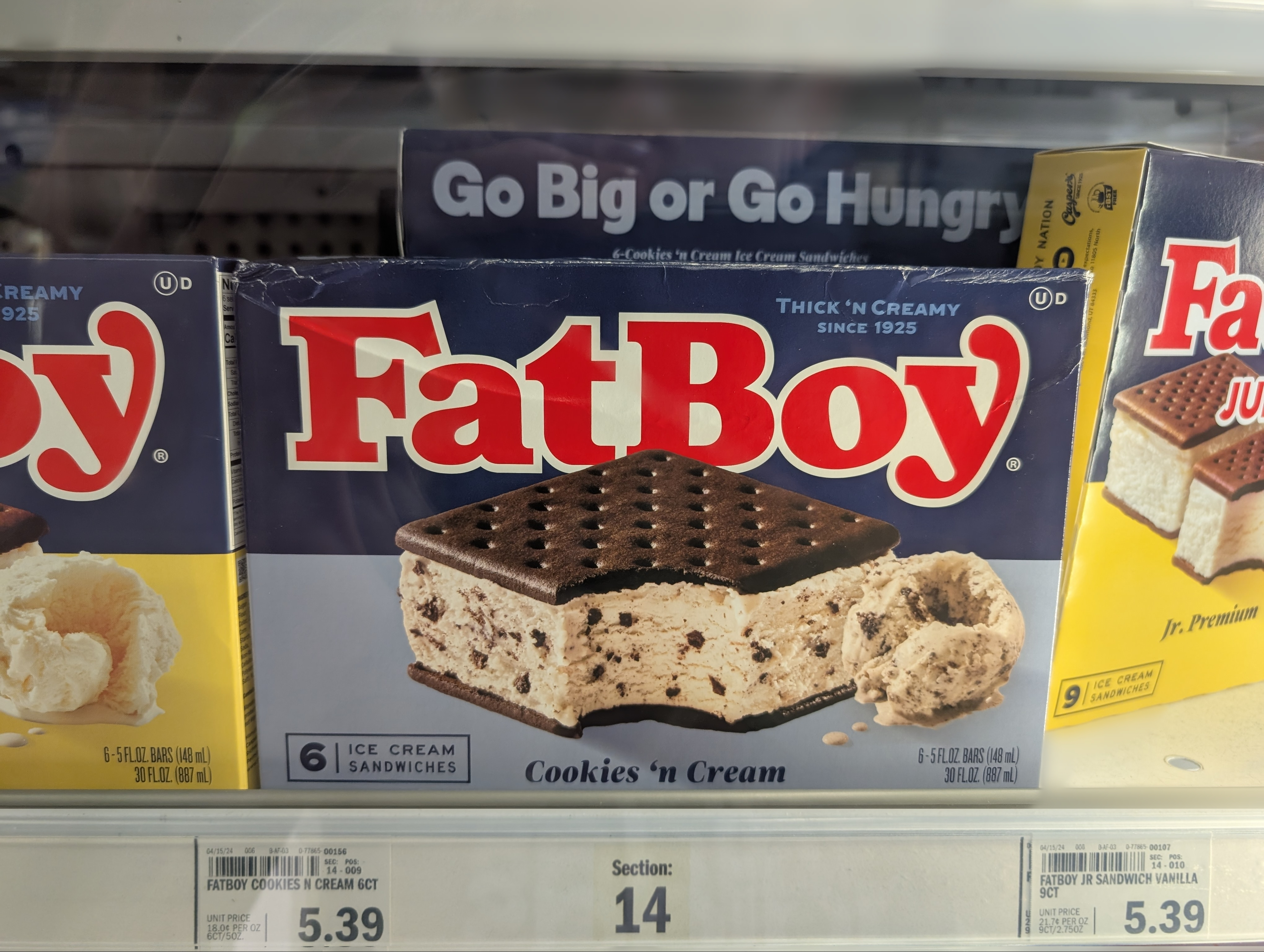
- Type: Subsidiary
- Industry: Food Processing
- Founded: Richmond, Utah (1925; 101 years ago)
- Founder: Casper Merrill
- Headquarters: Richmond, Utah, U.S.
- Key people: Casper Merrill
- Products: Ice cream
- Website: fatboyicecream.com

Casper's Ice Cream is a family-owned American ice cream company based in Richmond, Utah. The company's most popular product is the FatBoy.

== History ==
Casper's Ice Cream was established in 1925 by Casper Merrill (1902-1999) who made the first ice cream sundae on a stickbars with the milk and cream of his family's milk, and these bars were the original Ice Cream Nut Sundae on a Stick which he named it as the Casco Nut Sundaes. The first bars that are known today as the Fatboy Nut Sundaes were made with 10 gallon milk can. Merrill sold these ice cream bars on a 4th of July event and he then made the first Fatboy brand sandwich which was much larger than the usual ice cream novelty. Merrill died on October 15, 1999 at the age of 96 in Bountiful, Utah. The company is currently owned by Merrill's grandsons. Casper's Ice Cream is a member of the Utah Food Council's Utah's Own's program which was established in 2001 with the purpose of supporting and promoting local products.

In October 2020, Fatboy Ice Cream sponsored J. J. Yeley's NASCAR racer. In the racing debut of the brand, Yeley suffered a crash. He was uninjured, but Casper's capitalized on the incident by selling pieces of the car that Yeley signed. Fatboy continued sponsoring race cars. Yeley raced in the 2020 Season Finale 500 with the Fatboy paint job.

== Products ==
Casper's Ice Cream's original ingredients have changed very little throughout the years. There are more than 360,000 ice cream bars and sandwiches that are produced daily, which can be found in major national retailers. The brands are FatBoys, Casper's Classics, and the Active D'Lites. The Active D'Lites are ice cream bars featuring pre- and probiotics with only 110 to 140 calories depending on the flavor which are coated with fine European-style chocolate. The Casper's Classics were first created to compete the super premium novelty products which are bars coated with Guittard chocolate. The most popular product is the FatBoy which is a thick, creamy ice cream sandwich offered in flavors of vanilla, chocolate, strawberry, raspberry, cookies and cream, mint chocolate chip and peppermint.

The company also produces products under the Jolly Llama brand, which includes gluten-free ice cream cones, ice cream sandwiches, yogurt bars, and sorbet fruit pops.

Alongside the Jolly Llama brand, Casper's releases Churnbaby Ice Cream, whose most famous product are the "Ice cream cookie cups," which are containers of ice cream with a cookie atop. Churnbaby has released their own kinds of ice cream sandwiches.
