= 2021 Daytona 500 =

63rd Running of the event, held in Daytona Beach, Florida

Race details
- Race 1 of 36 in the 2021 NASCAR Cup Series
- Date: February 14–15, 2021
- Location: Daytona International Speedway in Daytona Beach, Florida
- Course: Permanent racing facility 2.5 mi (4 km)
- Distance: 200 laps, 500 mi (800 km)
- Average speed: 144.416 miles per hour (232.415 km/h)

Pole position
Driver	Alex Bowman	Hendrick Motorsports
- Time: 47.056

Qualifying race winners
Duel 1 Winner	Aric Almirola	Stewart-Haas Racing
Duel 2 Winner	Austin Dillon	Richard Childress Racing

Most laps led
Driver	Denny Hamlin	Joe Gibbs Racing
- Laps: 98

Winner
No. 34	Michael McDowell	Front Row Motorsports

Television in the United States
- Network: Fox
- Announcers: Mike Joy, Jeff Gordon and Clint Bowyer
- Nielsen ratings: 4.830 million

Radio in the United States
- Radio: MRN
- Booth announcers: Alex Hayden, Jeff Striegle, and Rusty Wallace
- Turn announcers: Dave Moody (1 & 2), Mike Bagley (Backstretch) and Kyle Rickey (3 & 4)

The 2021 Daytona 500, the 63rd running of the event, was a NASCAR Cup Series race that was held on February 14–15, 2021 at Daytona International Speedway in Daytona Beach, Florida. Contested over 200 laps on the 2.5-mile (4.0 km) asphalt superspeedway, it was the first race of the 2021 NASCAR Cup Series season. In one of the biggest surprise upsets in Daytona 500 history, Michael McDowell, driving for Front Row Motorsports, won after Team Penske teammates Joey Logano and Brad Keselowski wrecked battling for the lead on the final lap. McDowell was a 100–1 underdog, making his 358th Cup Series start and driving for a team with only two previous Cup Series victories.

== Report ==
Daytona International Speedway is a race track in Daytona Beach, Florida that is one of six superspeedways, the others being Auto Club Speedway, Pocono Raceway, Indianapolis Motor Speedway, Michigan International Speedway and Talladega Superspeedway.

=== Background ===
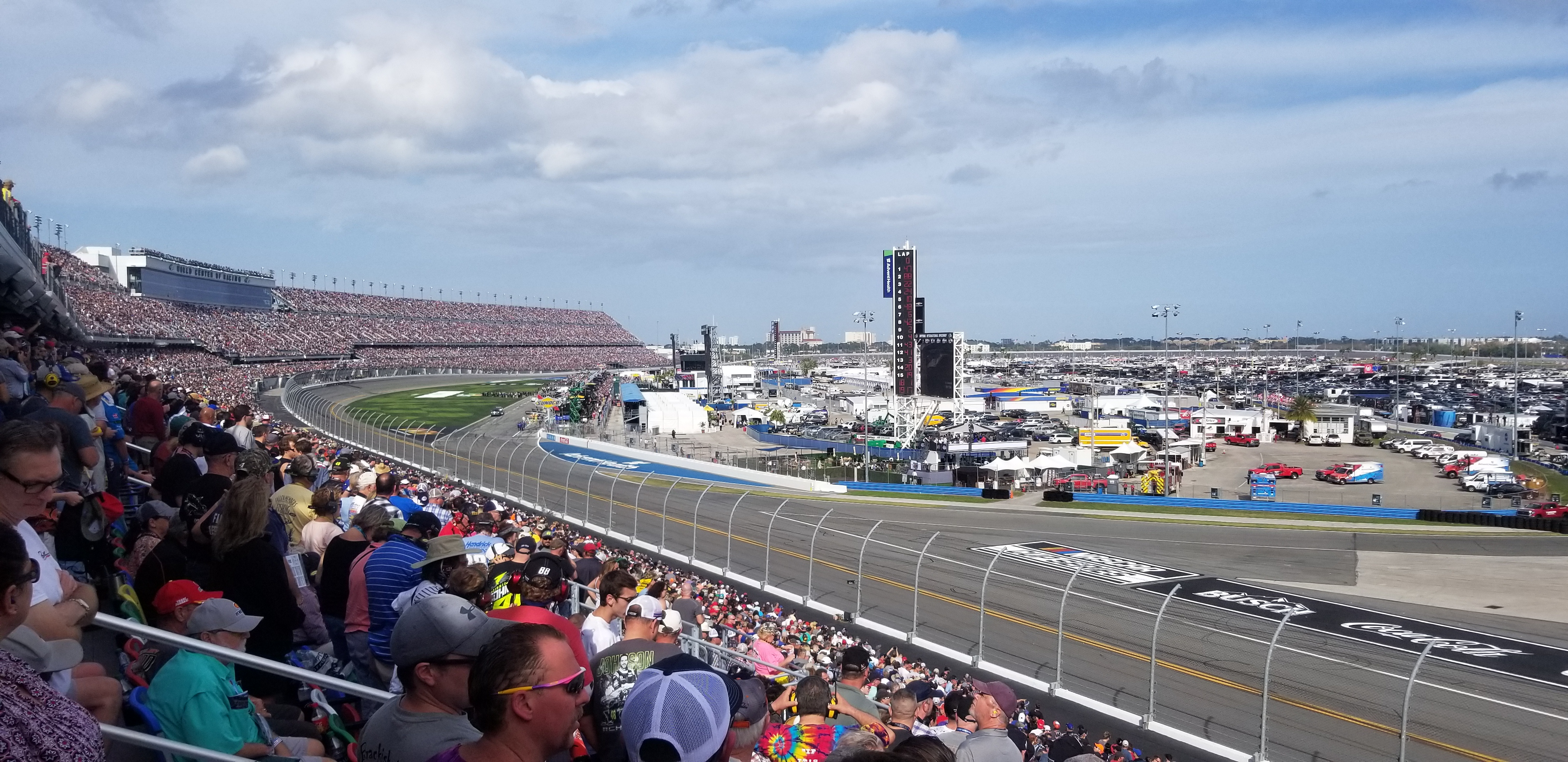
Daytona International Speedway, the circuit where the 63rd annual Daytona 500 took place

The program cover for the 2021 Daytona 500.

Daytona International Speedway is one of three superspeedways to hold NASCAR races, the other two being Indianapolis Motor Speedway and Talladega Superspeedway. The standard track at Daytona International Speedway is a four-turn superspeedway that is 2.5 miles (4.0 km) long. The track's turns are banked at 31 degrees, while the front stretch, the location of the finish line, is banked at 18 degrees. The race will be the return of multiple retired drivers, such as 2010 winner Jamie McMurray and Derrike Cope, the 1990 winner. The race will also be the debut of drivers Anthony Alfredo, Chase Briscoe, Austin Cindric and Noah Gragson. Although Gragson missed the race due to Crashing in duel 2. The race will also be the debut of many new teams, most notably 23XI Racing.

This is the first Daytona 500 without two-time Daytona 500 winner Jimmie Johnson since 2001.

==== Entry list ====
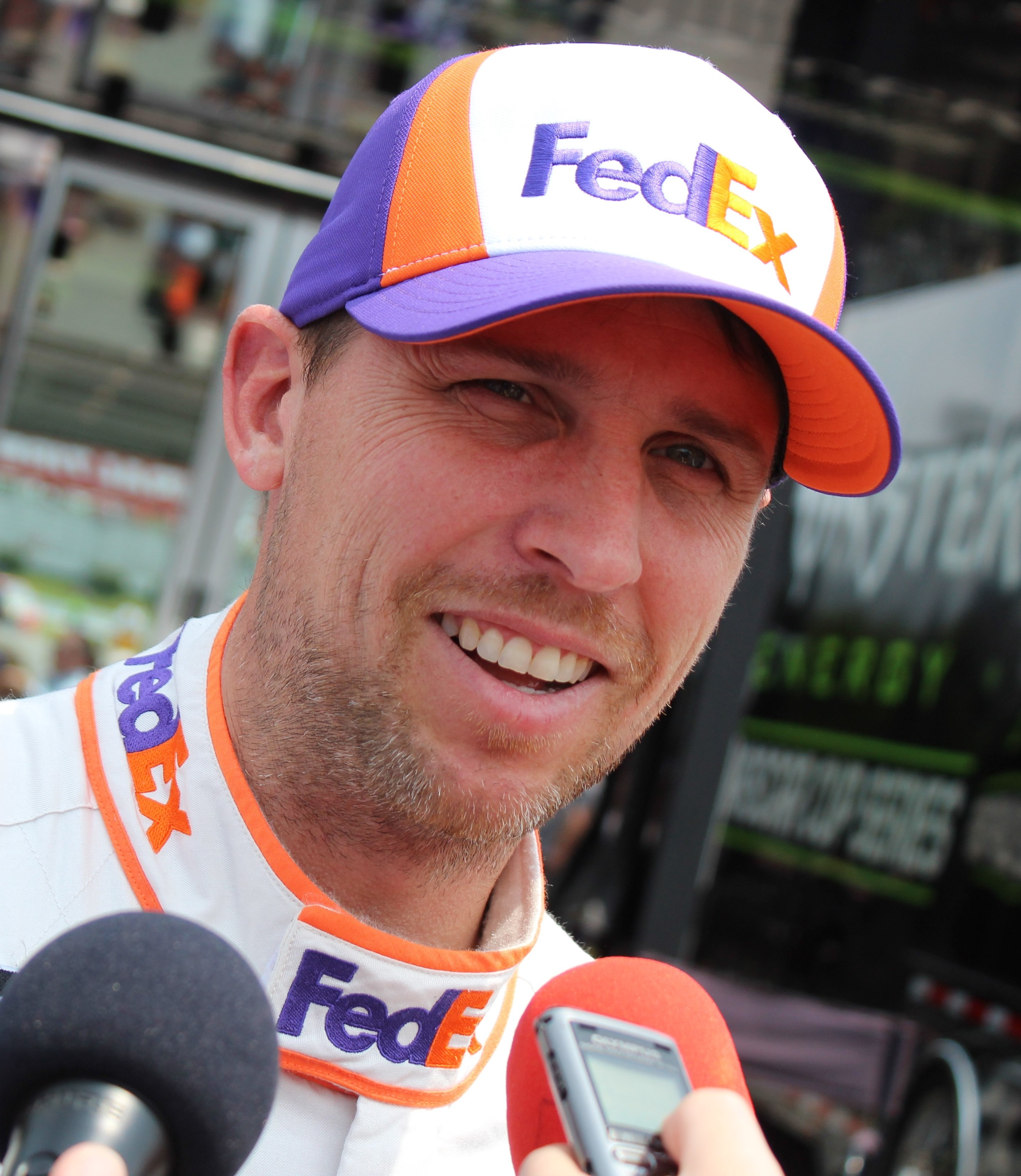
Denny Hamlin, double defending race winner.

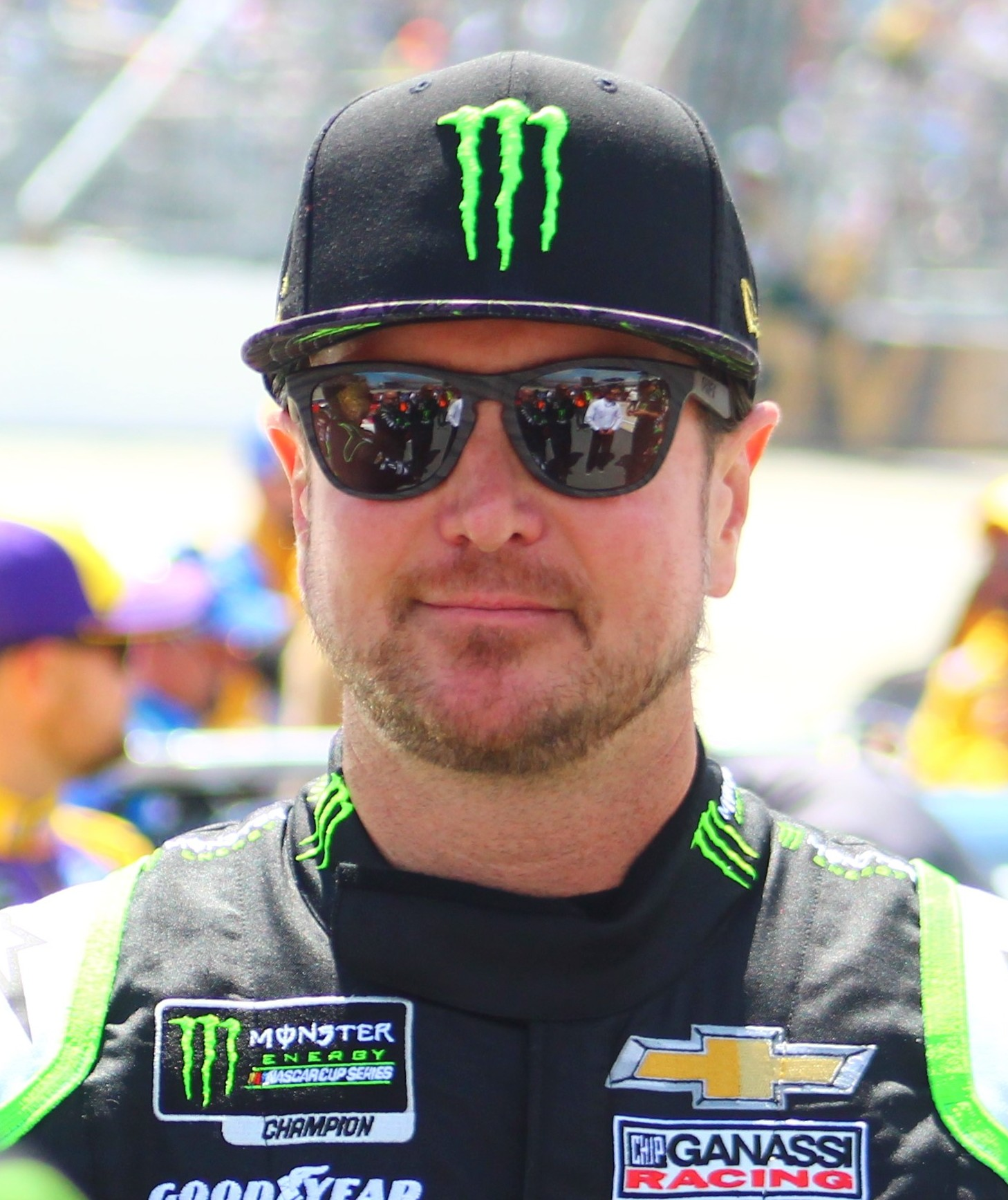
Kurt Busch, the 2017 winner, had the most prior starts of the field at 20.

- (W) denotes past 500 winner.
- (R) denotes rookie driver.
- (i) denotes driver who is ineligible for series driver points.

No.	Driver	Team	Manufacturer
00	Quin Houff	StarCom Racing	Chevrolet
1	Kurt Busch (W)	Chip Ganassi Racing	Chevrolet
2	Brad Keselowski	Team Penske	Ford
3	Austin Dillon (W)	Richard Childress Racing	Chevrolet
4	Kevin Harvick (W)	Stewart-Haas Racing	Ford
5	Kyle Larson	Hendrick Motorsports	Chevrolet
6	Ryan Newman (W)	Roush Fenway Racing	Ford
7	Corey LaJoie	Spire Motorsports	Chevrolet
8	Tyler Reddick	Richard Childress Racing	Chevrolet
9	Chase Elliott	Hendrick Motorsports	Chevrolet
10	Aric Almirola	Stewart-Haas Racing	Ford
11	Denny Hamlin (W)	Joe Gibbs Racing	Toyota
12	Ryan Blaney	Team Penske	Ford
13	Garrett Smithley (i)	MBM Motorsports	Ford
14	Chase Briscoe (R)	Stewart-Haas Racing	Ford
15	Derrike Cope (W)	Rick Ware Racing	Chevrolet
16	Kaz Grala	Kaulig Racing	Chevrolet
17	Chris Buescher	Roush Fenway Racing	Ford
18	Kyle Busch	Joe Gibbs Racing	Toyota
19	Martin Truex Jr.	Joe Gibbs Racing	Toyota
20	Christopher Bell	Joe Gibbs Racing	Toyota
21	Matt DiBenedetto	Wood Brothers Racing	Ford
22	Joey Logano (W)	Team Penske	Ford
23	Bubba Wallace	23XI Racing	Toyota
24	William Byron	Hendrick Motorsports	Chevrolet
33	Austin Cindric (i)	Team Penske	Ford
34	Michael McDowell	Front Row Motorsports	Ford
36	David Ragan	Front Row Motorsports	Ford
37	Ryan Preece	JTG Daugherty Racing	Chevrolet
38	Anthony Alfredo (R)	Front Row Motorsports	Ford
41	Cole Custer	Stewart-Haas Racing	Ford
42	Ross Chastain	Chip Ganassi Racing	Chevrolet
43	Erik Jones	Richard Petty Motorsports	Chevrolet
47	Ricky Stenhouse Jr.	JTG Daugherty Racing	Chevrolet
48	Alex Bowman	Hendrick Motorsports	Chevrolet
51	Cody Ware	Petty Ware Racing	Chevrolet
52	Josh Bilicki	Rick Ware Racing	Ford
53	Joey Gase	Rick Ware Racing	Ford
62	Noah Gragson (i)	Beard Motorsports	Chevrolet
66	Timmy Hill (i)	MBM Motorsports	Ford
77	Jamie McMurray (W)	Spire Motorsports	Chevrolet
78	B. J. McLeod (i)	Live Fast Motorsports	Ford
96	Ty Dillon (i)	Gaunt Brothers Racing	Toyota
99	Daniel Suárez	Trackhouse Racing Team	Chevrolet
Official entry list

== First practice (February 9) ==
Bubba Wallace was the fastest in the first practice session with a time of 45.057 seconds and a speed of 199.747 mph (321.462 km/h). This was the first practice session for a NASCAR Cup Series race in almost a year, the last one being at the 2020 March Phoenix Race.

Pos	No.	Driver	Team	Manufacturer	Time	Speed
1	23	Bubba Wallace	23XI Racing	Toyota	45.057	199.747
2	19	Martin Truex Jr.	Joe Gibbs Racing	Toyota	45.069	199.694
3	11	Denny Hamlin	Joe Gibbs Racing	Toyota	45.070	199.689
Official first practice results

== Qualifying ==
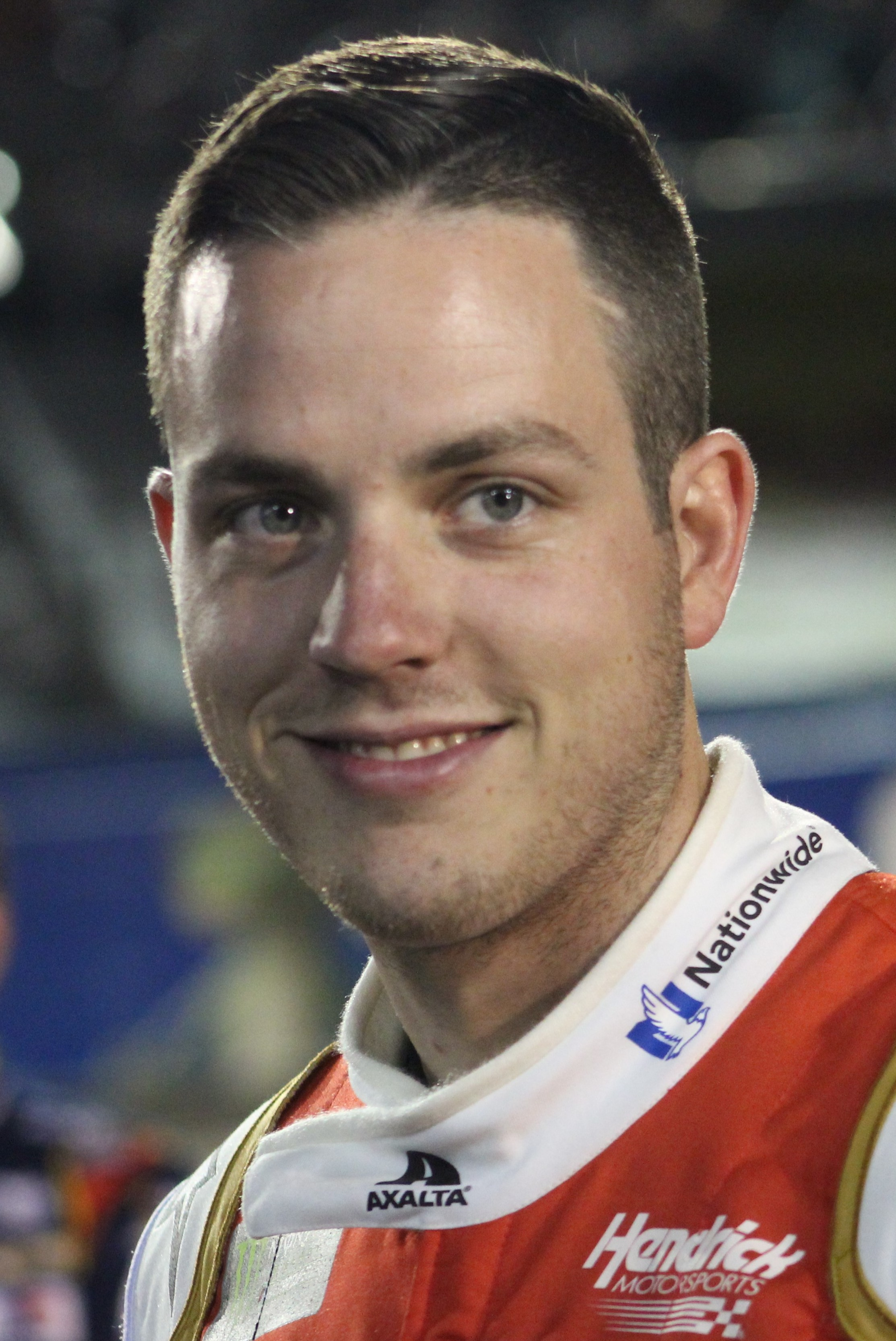
Alex Bowman won the pole.

Alex Bowman scored the pole for the race with a time of 47.056 and a speed of 191.261 mph (307.805 km/h). Electrical problems for Derrike Cope and multiple inspection failures for Noah Gragson kept them from taking a timed lap.

=== Qualifying results ===
Pos	No.	Driver	Team	Manufacturer	Time
1	48	Alex Bowman	Hendrick Motorsports	Chevrolet	47.056
2	24	William Byron	Hendrick Motorsports	Chevrolet	47.314
3	10	Aric Almirola	Stewart-Haas Racing	Ford	47.324
4	23	Bubba Wallace	23XI Racing	Toyota	47.474
5	47	Ricky Stenhouse Jr.	JTG Daugherty Racing	Chevrolet	47.477
6	4	Kevin Harvick	Stewart-Haas Racing	Ford	47.489
7	20	Christopher Bell	Joe Gibbs Racing	Toyota	47.573
8	37	Ryan Preece	JTG Daugherty Racing	Chevrolet	47.585
9	3	Austin Dillon	Richard Childress Racing	Chevrolet	47.631
10	99	Daniel Suárez	Trackhouse Racing Team	Chevrolet	47.636
11	11	Denny Hamlin	Joe Gibbs Racing	Toyota	47.695
12	9	Chase Elliott	Hendrick Motorsports	Chevrolet	47.695
13	36	David Ragan	Front Row Motorsports	Ford	47.730
14	1	Kurt Busch	Chip Ganassi Racing	Chevrolet	47.742
15	5	Kyle Larson	Hendrick Motorsports	Chevrolet	47.752
16	18	Kyle Busch	Joe Gibbs Racing	Toyota	47.780
17	21	Matt DiBenedetto	Wood Brothers Racing	Ford	47.881
18	12	Ryan Blaney	Team Penske	Ford	47.895
19	33	Austin Cindric (i)	Team Penske	Ford	47.900
20	16	Kaz Grala	Kaulig Racing	Chevrolet	47.925
21	22	Joey Logano	Team Penske	Ford	47.943
22	14	Chase Briscoe (R)	Stewart-Haas Racing	Ford	47.956
23	6	Ryan Newman	Roush Fenway Racing	Ford	47.960
24	42	Ross Chastain	Chip Ganassi Racing	Chevrolet	47.972
25	41	Cole Custer	Stewart-Haas Racing	Ford	48.060
26	2	Brad Keselowski	Team Penske	Ford	48.072
27	34	Michael McDowell	Front Row Motorsports	Ford	48.124
28	19	Martin Truex Jr.	Joe Gibbs Racing	Toyota	48.165
29	43	Erik Jones	Richard Petty Motorsports	Chevrolet	48.189
30	17	Chris Buescher	Roush Fenway Racing	Ford	48.269
31	8	Tyler Reddick	Richard Childress Racing	Chevrolet	48.347
32	38	Anthony Alfredo (R)	Front Row Motorsports	Ford	48.422
33	96	Ty Dillon (i)	Gaunt Brothers Racing	Toyota	48.446
34	77	Jamie McMurray	Spire Motorsports	Chevrolet	48.746
35	7	Corey LaJoie	Spire Motorsports	Chevrolet	48.767
36	00	Quin Houff	StarCom Racing	Chevrolet	49.571
37	13	Garrett Smithley (i)	MBM Motorsports	Ford	49.880
38	78	B. J. McLeod (i)	Live Fast Motorsports	Ford	49.985
39	66	Timmy Hill (i)	MBM Motorsports	Ford	50.016
40	51	Cody Ware	Petty Ware Racing	Chevrolet	50.074
41	53	Joey Gase	Rick Ware Racing	Ford	50.630
42	52	Josh Bilicki	Rick Ware Racing	Ford	50.926
43	15	Derrike Cope	Rick Ware Racing	Chevrolet	0.000
44	62	Noah Gragson (i)	Beard Motorsports	Chevrolet	0.000
Official qualifying results

== Bluegreen Vacations Duels ==
=== Duel 1 ===
==== Duel 1 results ====
Pos	Grid	No	Driver	Team	Manufacturer	Laps	Points
1	2	10	Aric Almirola	Stewart-Haas Racing	Ford	60	10
2	4	20	Christopher Bell	Joe Gibbs Racing	Toyota	60	9
3	12	6	Ryan Newman	Roush Fenway Racing	Ford	60	8
4	11	22	Joey Logano	Team Penske	Ford	60	7
5	5	37	Ryan Preece	JTG Daugherty Racing	Chevrolet	60	6
6	17	96	Ty Dillon (i)	Gaunt Brothers Racing	Toyota	60	0
7	8	5	Kyle Larson	Hendrick Motorsports	Chevrolet	60	4
8	6	99	Daniel Suárez	Trackhouse Racing Team	Chevrolet	60	3
9	14	34	Michael McDowell	Front Row Motorsports	Ford	60	2
10	18	77	Jamie McMurray	Spire Motorsports	Chevrolet	60	1
11	3	47	Ricky Stenhouse Jr.	JTG Daugherty Racing	Chevrolet	60	0
12	9	21	Matt DiBenedetto	Wood Brothers Racing	Ford	60	0
13	7	11	Denny Hamlin	Joe Gibbs Racing	Toyota	60	0
14	13	41	Cole Custer	Stewart-Haas Racing	Ford	60	0
15	16	8	Tyler Reddick	Richard Childress Racing	Chevrolet	60	0
16	10	33	Austin Cindric (i)	Team Penske	Ford	59	0
17	15	43	Erik Jones	Richard Petty Motorsports	Chevrolet	59	0
18	19	00	Quin Houff	StarCom Racing	Chevrolet	58	0
19	20	66	Timmy Hill (i)	MBM Motorsports	Ford	57	0
20	1	48	Alex Bowman	Hendrick Motorsports	Chevrolet	56	0
21	21	51	Cody Ware	Petty Ware Racing	Chevrolet	56	0
22	22	52	Josh Bilicki	Rick Ware Racing	Ford	14	0
Official race results

=== Duel 2 ===
==== Duel 2 results ====
Pos	Grid	No	Driver	Team	Manufacturer	Laps	Points
1	4	3	Austin Dillon	Richard Childress Racing	Chevrolet	63	10
2	2	23	Bubba Wallace	23XI Racing	Toyota	63	9
3	3	4	Kevin Harvick	Stewart-Haas Racing	Ford	63	8
4	8	18	Kyle Busch	Joe Gibbs Racing	Toyota	63	7
5	5	9	Chase Elliott	Hendrick Motorsports	Chevrolet	63	6
6	9	12	Ryan Blaney	Team Penske	Ford	63	5
7	17	7	Corey LaJoie	Spire Motorsports	Chevrolet	63	4
8	6	36	David Ragan	Front Row Motorsports	Ford	63	3
9	7	1	Kurt Busch	Chip Ganassi Racing	Chevrolet	63	2
10	15	17	Chris Buescher	Roush Fenway Racing	Ford	63	1
11	13	2	Brad Keselowski	Team Penske	Ford	63	0
12	14	19	Martin Truex Jr.	Joe Gibbs Racing	Toyota	63	0
13	20	53	Joey Gase	Rick Ware Racing	Ford	63	0
14	10	16	Kaz Grala	Kaulig Racing	Chevrolet	63	0
15	11	14	Chase Briscoe (R)	Stewart-Haas Racing	Ford	61	0
16	18	13	Garrett Smithley (i)	MBM Motorsports	Ford	61	0
17	21	15	Derrike Cope	Rick Ware Racing	Chevrolet	59	0
18	22	62	Noah Gragson (i)	Beard Motorsports	Chevrolet	56	0
19	1	24	William Byron	Hendrick Motorsports	Chevrolet	56	0
20	12	42	Ross Chastain	Chip Ganassi Racing	Chevrolet	56	0
21	16	38	Anthony Alfredo (R)	Front Row Motorsports	Ford	35	0
22	19	78	B. J. McLeod (i)	Live Fast Motorsports	Ford	35	0
Official race results

=== Starting lineup ===
Pos	No	Driver	Team	Manufacturer	Notes
1	48	Alex Bowman	Hendrick Motorsports	Chevrolet	Fastest in pole qualifying
2	24	William Byron	Hendrick Motorsports	Chevrolet	Second in pole qualifying
3	10	Aric Almirola	Stewart-Haas Racing	Ford	Duel 1 Winner
4	3	Austin Dillon	Richard Childress Racing	Chevrolet	Duel 2 Winner
5	20	Christopher Bell	Joe Gibbs Racing	Toyota	Second in Duel 1
6	23	Bubba Wallace	23XI Racing	Toyota	Second in Duel 2
7	6	Ryan Newman	Roush Fenway Racing	Ford	Third in Duel 1
8	4	Kevin Harvick	Stewart-Haas Racing	Ford	Third in Duel 2
9	22	Joey Logano	Team Penske	Ford	Fourth in Duel 1
10	18	Kyle Busch	Joe Gibbs Racing	Toyota	Fourth in Duel 2
11	37	Ryan Preece	JTG Daugherty Racing	Chevrolet	Fifth in Duel 1
12	9	Chase Elliott	Hendrick Motorsports	Chevrolet	Fifth in Duel 2
13	5	Kyle Larson	Hendrick Motorsports	Chevrolet	Seventh in Duel 1
14	12	Ryan Blaney	Team Penske	Ford	Sixth in Duel 2
15	99	Daniel Suárez	Trackhouse Racing Team	Chevrolet	Eighth in Duel 1
16	7	Corey LaJoie	Spire Motorsports	Chevrolet	Seventh in Duel 2
17	34	Michael McDowell	Front Row Motorsports	Ford	Ninth in Duel 1
18	36	David Ragan	Front Row Motorsports	Ford	Eighth in Duel 2
19	77	Jamie McMurray	Spire Motorsports	Chevrolet	Tenth in Duel 1
20	1	Kurt Busch	Chip Ganassi Racing	Chevrolet	Ninth in Duel 2
21	47	Ricky Stenhouse Jr.	JTG Daugherty Racing	Chevrolet	Eleventh in Duel 1
22	17	Chris Buescher	Roush Fenway Racing	Ford	Tenth in Duel 2
23	21	Matt DiBenedetto	Wood Brothers Racing	Ford	Twelfth in Duel 1
24	2	Brad Keselowski	Team Penske	Ford	Eleventh in Duel 2
25	11	Denny Hamlin	Joe Gibbs Racing	Toyota	Thirteenth in Duel 1
26	19	Martin Truex Jr.	Joe Gibbs Racing	Toyota	Twelfth in Duel 2
27	41	Cole Custer	Stewart-Haas Racing	Ford	Fourteenth in Duel 1
28	53	Joey Gase	Rick Ware Racing	Ford	Thirteenth in Duel 2
29	8	Tyler Reddick	Richard Childress Racing	Chevrolet	Fifteenth in Duel 1
30	14	Chase Briscoe (R)	Stewart-Haas Racing	Ford	Fifteenth in Duel 2
31	43	Erik Jones	Richard Petty Motorsports	Chevrolet	Seventeenth in Duel 1
32	15	Derrike Cope	Rick Ware Racing	Chevrolet	Seventeenth in Duel 2
33	00	Quin Houff	StarCom Racing	Chevrolet	Eighteenth in Duel 1
34	42	Ross Chastain	Chip Ganassi Racing	Chevrolet	Twentieth in Duel 2
35	51	Cody Ware	Petty Ware Racing	Chevrolet	21st in Duel 1
36	38	Anthony Alfredo (R)	Front Row Motorsports	Ford	21st in Duel 2
37	52	Josh Bilicki	Rick Ware Racing	Ford	22nd in Duel 1
38	78	B. J. McLeod (i)	Live Fast Motorsports	Ford	22nd in Duel 2
39	33	Austin Cindric (i)	Team Penske	Ford	Qualifying speed
40	16	Kaz Grala	Kaulig Racing	Chevrolet	Qualifying speed
Did not qualify
41	96	Ty Dillon (i)	Gaunt Brothers Racing	Toyota	
42	13	Garrett Smithley (i)	MBM Motorsports	Ford	
43	66	Timmy Hill (i)	MBM Motorsports	Ford	
44	62	Noah Gragson (i)	Beard Motorsports	Chevrolet	
Official starting lineup

== Practice (post–Duels) ==
=== Second practice (February 13) ===
Brad Keselowski was the fastest in the second practice session with a time of 45.826 seconds and a speed of 196.395 mph (316.067 km/h).

Pos	No.	Driver	Team	Manufacturer	Time	Speed
1	2	Brad Keselowski	Team Penske	Ford	45.826	196.395
2	18	Kyle Busch	Joe Gibbs Racing	Toyota	46.051	195.435
3	23	Bubba Wallace	23XI Racing	Toyota	46.080	195.313
Official second practice results

=== Final practice (February 13) ===
Final practice session scheduled for Saturday was cancelled due to rain.

== Race ==
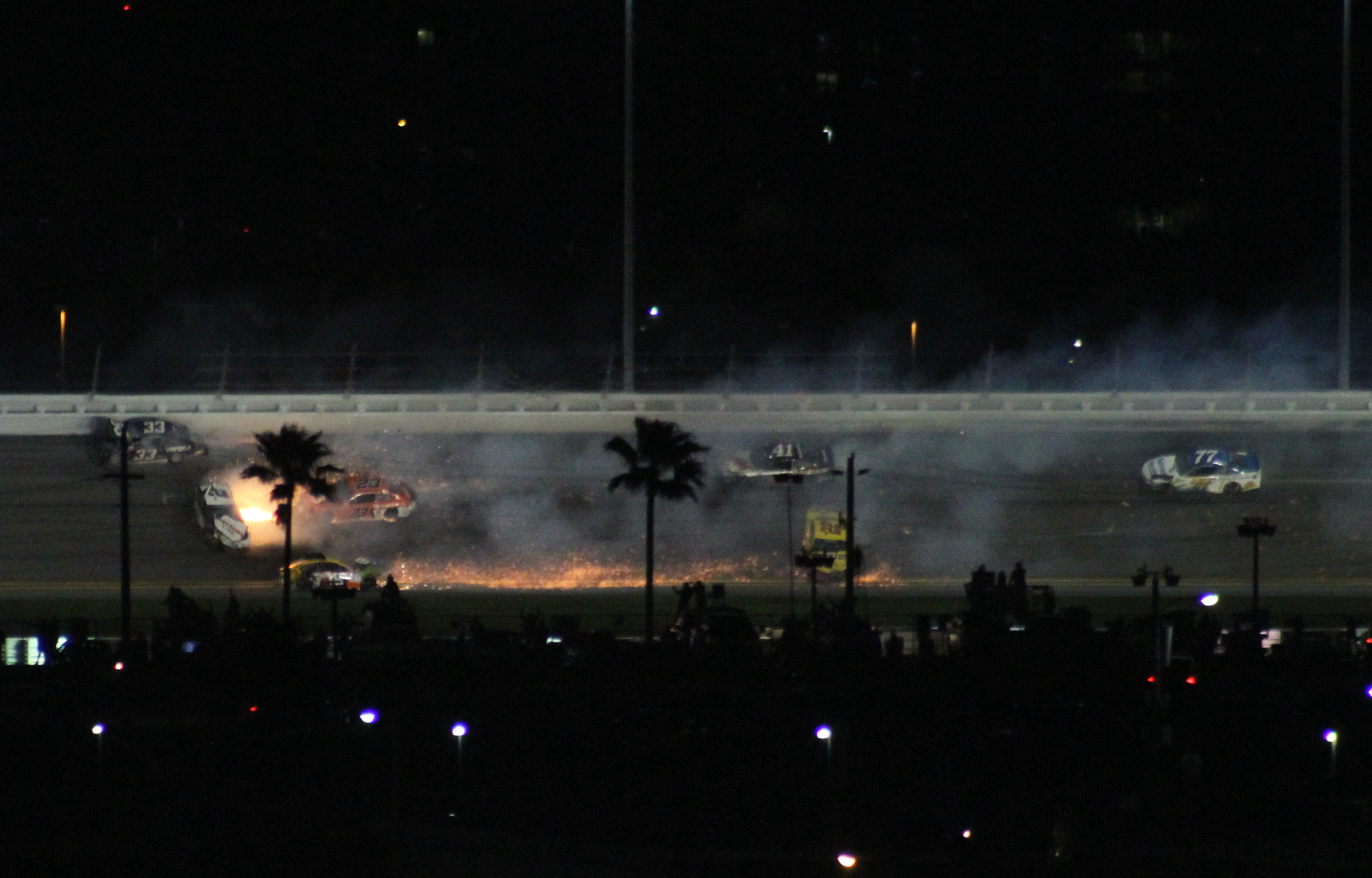
Teammates Brad Keselowski and Joey Logano wrecked on the final lap

=== Stage Results ===
Stage One Laps: 65

Pos	No	Driver	Team	Manufacturer	Points
1	11	Denny Hamlin	Joe Gibbs Racing	Toyota	10
2	37	Ryan Preece	JTG Daugherty Racing	Chevrolet	9
3	3	Austin Dillon	Richard Childress Racing	Chevrolet	8
4	5	Kyle Larson	Hendrick Motorsports	Chevrolet	7
5	33	Austin Cindric (i)	Team Penske	Ford	0
6	20	Christopher Bell	Joe Gibbs Racing	Toyota	5
7	23	Bubba Wallace	23XI Racing	Toyota	4
8	22	Joey Logano	Team Penske	Ford	3
9	42	Ross Chastain	Chip Ganassi Racing	Chevrolet	2
10	41	Cole Custer	Stewart-Haas Racing	Ford	1
Official stage one results

Stage Two Laps: 65

Pos	No	Driver	Team	Manufacturer	Points
1	11	Denny Hamlin	Joe Gibbs Racing	Toyota	10
2	4	Kevin Harvick	Stewart-Haas Racing	Ford	9
3	23	Bubba Wallace	23XI Racing	Toyota	8
4	9	Chase Elliott	Hendrick Motorsports	Chevrolet	7
5	3	Austin Dillon	Richard Childress Racing	Chevrolet	6
6	22	Joey Logano	Team Penske	Ford	5
7	34	Michael McDowell	Front Row Motorsports	Ford	4
8	5	Kyle Larson	Hendrick Motorsports	Chevrolet	3
9	18	Kyle Busch	Joe Gibbs Racing	Toyota	2
10	2	Brad Keselowski	Team Penske	Ford	1
Official stage two results

=== Final Stage Results ===
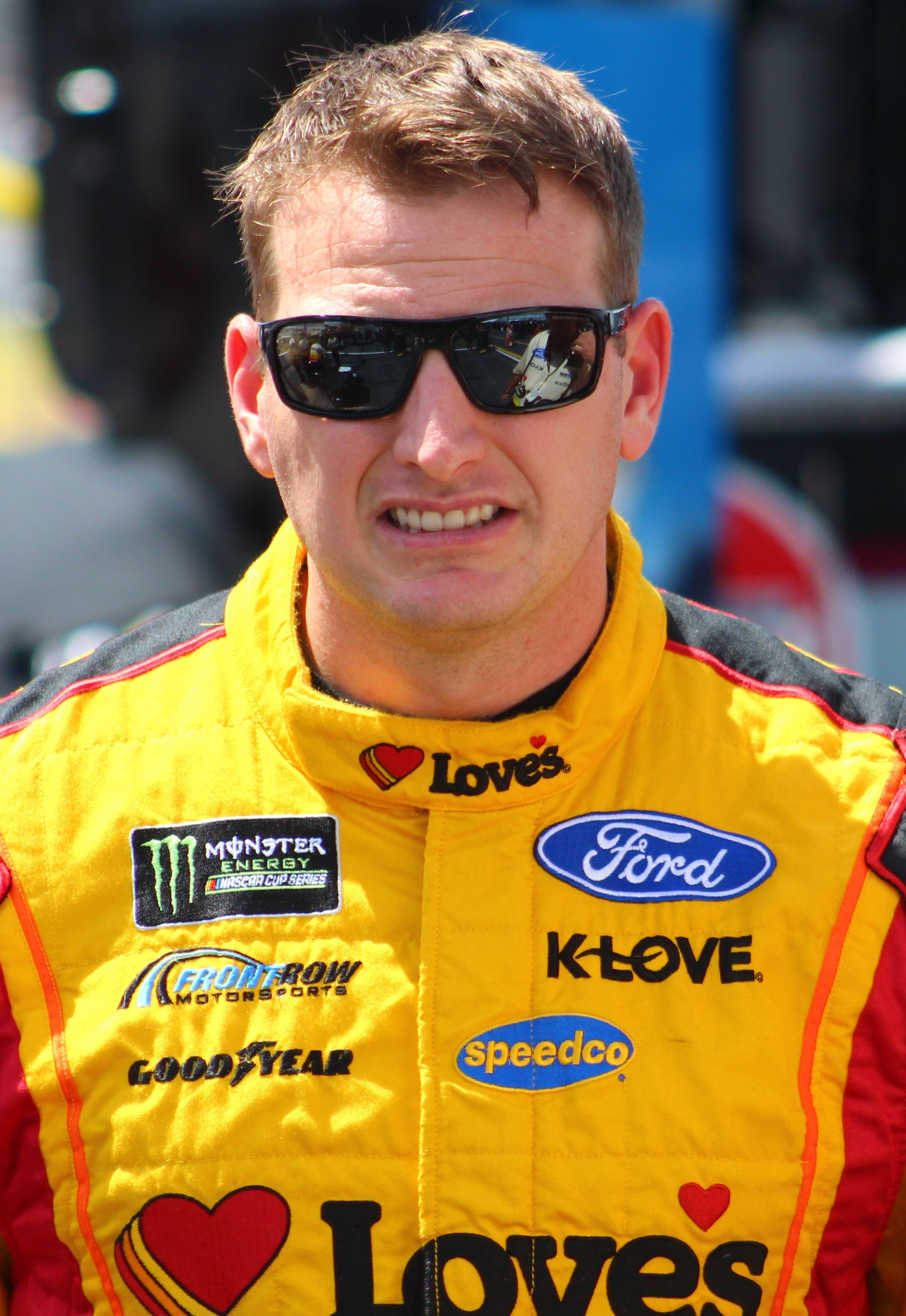
Michael McDowell won his first Cup race in his 358th start

Stage Three Laps: 70

Pos	Grid	No	Driver	Team	Manufacturer	Laps	Points
1	17	34	Michael McDowell	Front Row Motorsports	Ford	200	44
2	12	9	Chase Elliott	Hendrick Motorsports	Chevrolet	200	42
3	4	3	Austin Dillon	Richard Childress Racing	Chevrolet	200	48
4	8	4	Kevin Harvick	Stewart-Haas Racing	Ford	200	42
5	25	11	Denny Hamlin	Joe Gibbs Racing	Toyota	200	52
6	11	37	Ryan Preece	JTG Daugherty Racing	Chevrolet	200	40
7	34	42	Ross Chastain	Chip Ganassi Racing	Chevrolet	200	32
8	19	77	Jamie McMurray	Spire Motorsports	Chevrolet	200	29
9	16	7	Corey LaJoie	Spire Motorsports	Chevrolet	200	28
10	13	5	Kyle Larson	Hendrick Motorsports	Chevrolet	200	37
11	27	41	Cole Custer	Stewart-Haas Racing	Ford	200	27
12	9	22	Joey Logano	Team Penske	Ford	199	33
13	24	2	Brad Keselowski	Team Penske	Ford	199	25
14	10	18	Kyle Busch	Joe Gibbs Racing	Toyota	199	25
15	39	33	Austin Cindric (i)	Team Penske	Ford	199	0
16	5	20	Christopher Bell	Joe Gibbs Racing	Toyota	199	26
17	6	23	Bubba Wallace	23XI Racing	Toyota	198	32
18	21	47	Ricky Stenhouse Jr.	JTG Daugherty Racing	Chevrolet	198	19
19	30	14	Chase Briscoe (R)	Stewart-Haas Racing	Ford	197	18
20	28	53	Joey Gase	Rick Ware Racing	Ford	196	17
21	35	51	Cody Ware	Petty Ware Racing	Chevrolet	196	16
22	20	1	Kurt Busch	Chip Ganassi Racing	Chevrolet	195	15
23	38	78	B. J. McLeod (i)	Live Fast Motorsports	Ford	195	0
24	37	52	Josh Bilicki	Rick Ware Racing	Ford	194	13
25	26	19	Martin Truex Jr.	Joe Gibbs Racing	Toyota	193	12
26	2	24	William Byron	Hendrick Motorsports	Chevrolet	191	11
27	29	8	Tyler Reddick	Richard Childress Racing	Chevrolet	188	10
28	40	16	Kaz Grala	Kaulig Racing	Chevrolet	114	9
29	33	00	Quin Houff	StarCom Racing	Chevrolet	37	8
30	14	12	Ryan Blaney	Team Penske	Ford	14	7
31	22	17	Chris Buescher	Roush Fenway Racing	Ford	14	6
32	36	38	Anthony Alfredo (R)	Front Row Motorsports	Ford	14	5
33	23	21	Matt DiBenedetto	Wood Brothers Racing	Ford	14	4
34	3	10	Aric Almirola	Stewart-Haas Racing	Ford	13	3
35	1	48	Alex Bowman	Hendrick Motorsports	Chevrolet	13	2
36	15	99	Daniel Suárez	Trackhouse Racing Team	Chevrolet	13	1
37	18	36	David Ragan	Front Row Motorsports	Ford	13	1
38	7	6	Ryan Newman	Roush Fenway Racing	Ford	13	1
39	31	43	Erik Jones	Richard Petty Motorsports	Chevrolet	13	1
40	32	15	Derrike Cope	Rick Ware Racing	Chevrolet	3	1
Official race results

=== Race statistics ===
- Lead changes: 22 among 13 different drivers
- Cautions/Laps: 7 for 40
- Red flags: 1 for 5 hours, 40 minutes and 29 seconds
- Time of race: 3 hours, 27 minutes and 44 seconds
- Average speed: 144.416 miles per hour (232.415 km/h)

== Media ==
=== Television ===
Since 2001—with the exception of 2002, 2004 and 2006—the Daytona 500 has been broadcast on Fox in the United States. The booth crew consisted of longtime NASCAR lap-by-lap announcer Mike Joy, three-time Daytona 500 champion Jeff Gordon and Clint Bowyer. Jamie Little, Regan Smith and Vince Welch handled pit road for the television side. 1992 and 1998 Daytona 500 winning crew chief Larry McReynolds provided insight from the Fox Sports studio in Charlotte.

Fox Television
Booth announcers	Pit reporters	In-race analyst
Lap-by-lap: Mike Joy; Color-commentator: Jeff Gordon; Color-commentator: Clint Bowyer	Jamie Little; Regan Smith; Vince Welch	Larry McReynolds

=== Radio ===
The race was broadcast on radio by the Motor Racing Network—who has covered the Daytona 500 since 1970—and was simulcast on Sirius XM NASCAR Radio. The booth crew consisted of Alex Hayden, Jeff Striegle and 1989 Cup Series champion Rusty Wallace. Longtime turn announcer Dave Moody was the lead turn announcer, calling the race from atop the Sunoco tower outside the exit of turn 2 when the field raced through turns 1 and 2. Mike Bagley worked the backstretch for the race from a spotter's stand on the inside of the track & Kyle Rickey called the race when the field raced through turns 3 and 4 from the Sunoco tower outside the exit of turn 4. On pit road, MRN was manned by Steve Post and Kim Coon.

MRN Radio
Booth announcers	Turn announcers	Pit reporters
Lead announcer: Alex Hayden; Announcer: Jeff Striegle; Announcer: Rusty Wallace	Turns 1 & 2: Dave Moody; Backstretch: Mike Bagley; Turns 3 & 4: Kyle Rickey	Steve Post; Kim Coon

== Standings after the race ==
Drivers' Championship standings

Pos	Driver	Points
1	Austin Dillon	58
2	Denny Hamlin	52 (–6)
3	Kevin Harvick	50 (–8)
4	Chase Elliott	48 (–10)
5	Michael McDowell	46 (–12)
6	Ryan Preece	46 (–12)
7	Kyle Larson	41 (–17)
8	Bubba Wallace	41 (–17)
9	Joey Logano	40 (–18)
10	Christopher Bell	35 (–23)
11	Ross Chastain	32 (–26)
12	Corey LaJoie	32 (–26)
13	Kyle Busch	32 (–26)
14	Jamie McMurray	30 (–28)
15	Cole Custer	27 (–31)
16	Brad Keselowski	25 (–33)
Official driver's standings

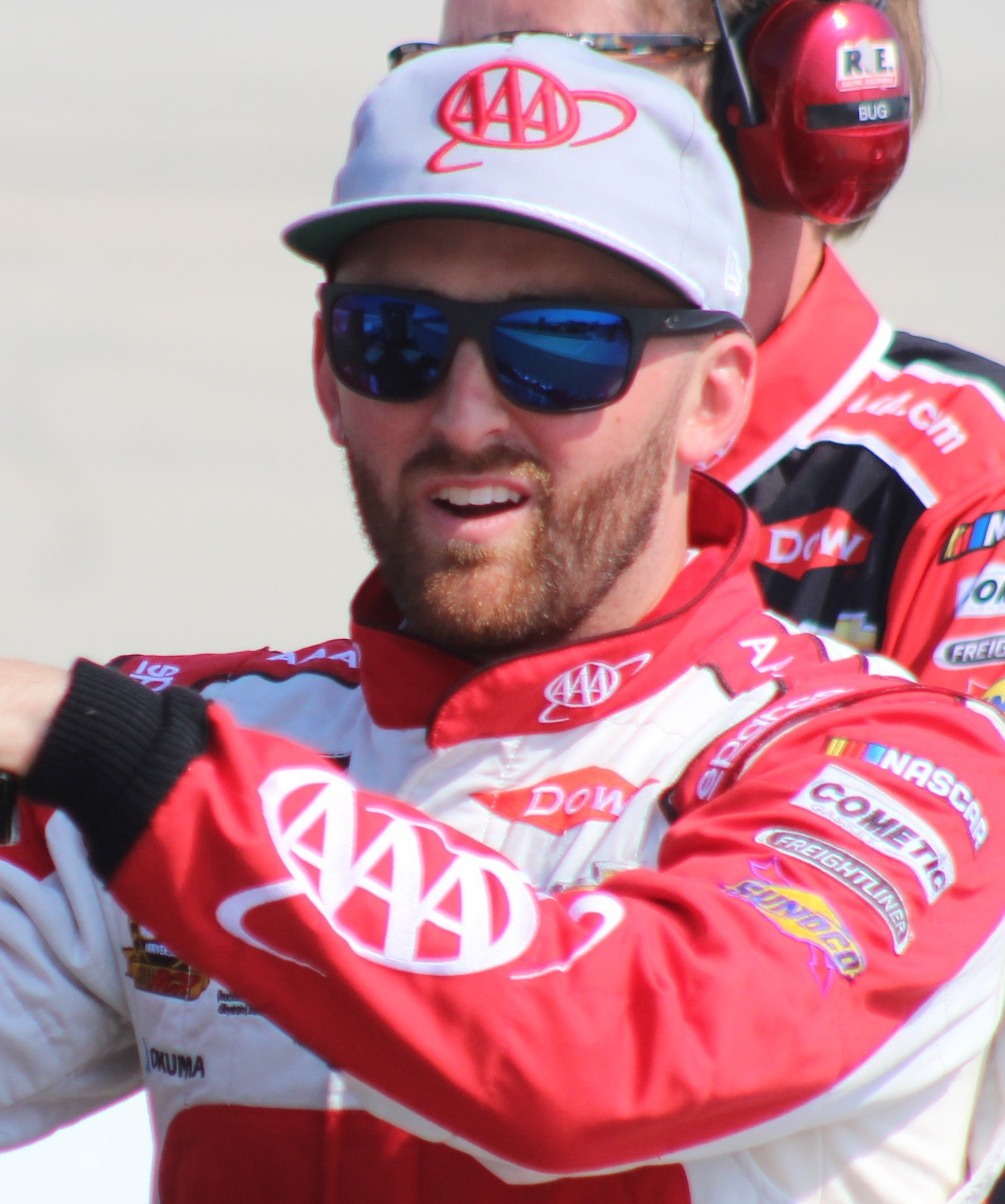
Austin Dillon left the 500 as the points leader

Manufacturers' Championship standings

Pos	Manufacturer	Points
1	Ford	40
2	Chevrolet	35 (–5)
3	Toyota	32 (–8)

- Note: Only the first 16 positions are included for the driver standings.

Previous race: 2020 Season Finale 500	NASCAR Cup Series; 2021 season	Next race: 2021 O'Reilly Auto Parts 253
