= 2021 O'Reilly Auto Parts 253 =

NASCAR Cup Series race

Race details
- Race 2 of 36 in the 2021 NASCAR Cup Series
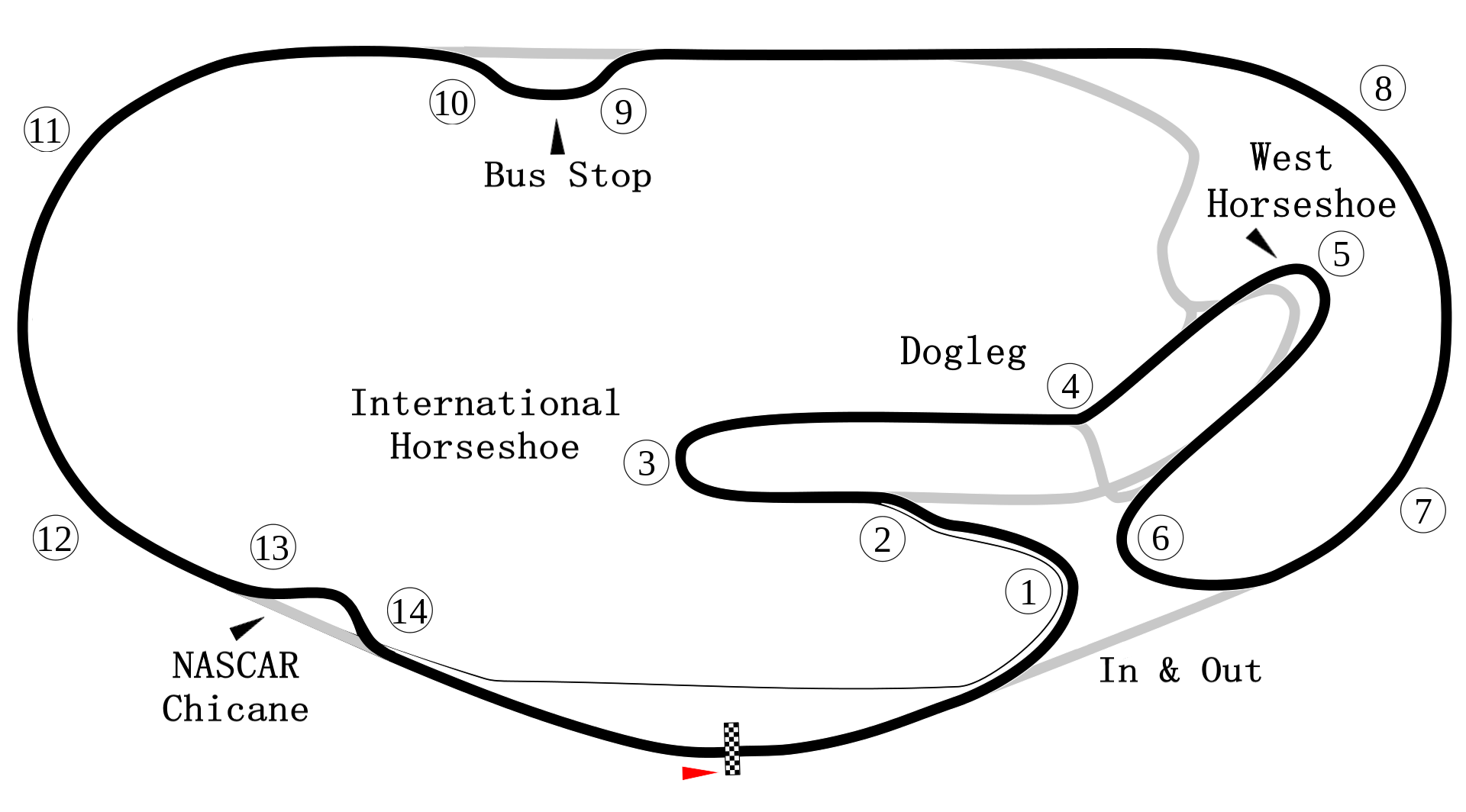
- Date: February 21, 2021
- Location: Daytona International Speedway in Daytona Beach, Florida
- Course: Permanent racing facility
- Course length: 3.610 miles (5.810 km)
- Distance: 70 laps, 252.7 mi (406.681 km)
- Average speed: 84.452 miles per hour (135.912 km/h)

Pole position
Driver	Chase Elliott	Hendrick Motorsports
- Grid positions set by competition-based formula

Most laps led
Driver	Chase Elliott	Hendrick Motorsports
- Laps: 45

Winner
No. 20	Christopher Bell	Joe Gibbs Racing

Television in the United States
- Network: Fox
- Announcers: Mike Joy, Jeff Gordon and Clint Bowyer
- Nielsen ratings: 4.750 million

Radio in the United States
- Radio: MRN
- Booth announcers: Alex Hayden, Mike Bagley and Rusty Wallace
- Turn announcers: Dave Moody (Infield Section: Turns 2–6); Kurt Becker (Turns 7–10); Dan Hubbard (Turns 11–14)

The 2021 O'Reilly Auto Parts 253 was a NASCAR Cup Series race that was held on February 21, 2021 at Daytona International Speedway in Daytona Beach, Florida.

Added as a replacement for the cancelled Auto Club 400 because of California restrictions related to the COVID-19 pandemic, the 2021 race was scheduled for 70 laps on the 3.61-mile (5.81 km) road course, it was the second race of the 2021 NASCAR Cup Series season. The race was lengthened from the 2020 schedule, where it was run at 65 laps of the course for 235 miles. It was classified as a 400-kilometer (250 mi) race in 2021, similar to the Charlotte and Road America road course races.

At 84.452 miles per hour (135.912 km/h), it was the slowest Daytona race in NASCAR Cup Series history, although it was run on the road course, Christopher Bell scored his inaugural Cup Series win.

== Le Mans Chicane issues ==
During the Busch Clash, which had been held on the road course as planned in order to allow the current (sixth-generation) NASCAR Cup car to be used before the seventh-generation Cup car would have been launched in 2021 before a delay was announced because of developmental delays, track visibility issues came after a safety car situation was called on Lap 9 of the first segment of 15 laps with excessive mud and dirt at the exit of the Le Mans Chicane (the bus stop on the backstretch). The mud and dirt led to Kevin Harvick spinning early in the race, visibility issues, and later in the race, leader Martin Truex Jr. caused a safety car by crashing at the exit after overdriving the chicane and losing traction from the mud that had accumulated during the race.

A social media post by Denny Hamlin confirmed on February 16 that additional work was being done in the bus stop kerbing, with officials planning to add "sausage kerbing" (also known as "turtles") to the Le Mans Chicane as used in the chicane before pit entrance (a temporary chicane in the skid pad exiting Turn 4) to prevent drivers from short-cutting the chicane and throwing mud on the circuit. The right rumble strip is 36 feet (11 m) long while the left is 30 feet (9.1 m) long.

== Entry list ==
- (R) denotes rookie driver.
- (i) denotes driver who are ineligible for series driver points.

No.	Driver	Team	Manufacturer
00	Quin Houff	StarCom Racing	Chevrolet
1	Kurt Busch	Chip Ganassi Racing	Chevrolet
2	Brad Keselowski	Team Penske	Ford
3	Austin Dillon	Richard Childress Racing	Chevrolet
4	Kevin Harvick	Stewart-Haas Racing	Ford
5	Kyle Larson	Hendrick Motorsports	Chevrolet
6	Ryan Newman	Roush Fenway Racing	Ford
7	Corey LaJoie	Spire Motorsports	Chevrolet
8	Tyler Reddick	Richard Childress Racing	Chevrolet
9	Chase Elliott	Hendrick Motorsports	Chevrolet
10	Aric Almirola	Stewart-Haas Racing	Ford
11	Denny Hamlin	Joe Gibbs Racing	Toyota
12	Ryan Blaney	Team Penske	Ford
14	Chase Briscoe (R)	Stewart-Haas Racing	Ford
15	James Davison	Rick Ware Racing	Chevrolet
16	A. J. Allmendinger (i)	Kaulig Racing	Chevrolet
17	Chris Buescher	Roush Fenway Racing	Ford
18	Kyle Busch	Joe Gibbs Racing	Toyota
19	Martin Truex Jr.	Joe Gibbs Racing	Toyota
20	Christopher Bell	Joe Gibbs Racing	Toyota
21	Matt DiBenedetto	Wood Brothers Racing	Ford
22	Joey Logano	Team Penske	Ford
23	Bubba Wallace	23XI Racing	Toyota
24	William Byron	Hendrick Motorsports	Chevrolet
34	Michael McDowell	Front Row Motorsports	Ford
37	Ryan Preece	JTG Daugherty Racing	Chevrolet
38	Anthony Alfredo (R)	Front Row Motorsports	Ford
41	Cole Custer	Stewart-Haas Racing	Ford
42	Ross Chastain	Chip Ganassi Racing	Chevrolet
43	Erik Jones	Richard Petty Motorsports	Chevrolet
47	Ricky Stenhouse Jr.	JTG Daugherty Racing	Chevrolet
48	Alex Bowman	Hendrick Motorsports	Chevrolet
51	Cody Ware (i)	Petty Ware Racing	Chevrolet
52	Josh Bilicki	Rick Ware Racing	Ford
53	Garrett Smithley (i)	Rick Ware Racing	Chevrolet
66	Timmy Hill (i)	MBM Motorsports	Toyota
77	Justin Haley (i)	Spire Motorsports	Chevrolet
78	Scott Heckert	Live Fast Motorsports	Ford
96	Ty Dillon (i)	Gaunt Brothers Racing	Toyota
99	Daniel Suárez	Trackhouse Racing Team	Chevrolet
Official entry list

=== Starting Lineup ===
Chase Elliott was awarded the pole for the race. This is the first of 28 scheduled one-day races using the competition-based formula from the 2020 season that began with last year's road course race based on owner point standings (35%) and from the previous round, the car's fastest lap (15%) and finishing position (driver's for 25% and owner's for 25%; 41st position is used in the average if the driver or owner did not participate in the previous race).

Pos	No.	Driver	Team	Manufacturer
1	9	Chase Elliott	Hendrick Motorsports	Chevrolet
2	34	Michael McDowell	Front Row Motorsports	Ford
3	3	Austin Dillon	Richard Childress Racing	Chevrolet
4	11	Denny Hamlin	Joe Gibbs Racing	Toyota
5	4	Kevin Harvick	Stewart-Haas Racing	Ford
6	37	Ryan Preece	JTG Daugherty Racing	Chevrolet
7	7	Corey LaJoie	Spire Motorsports	Chevrolet
8	5	Kyle Larson	Hendrick Motorsports	Chevrolet
9	42	Ross Chastain	Chip Ganassi Racing	Chevrolet
10	23	Bubba Wallace	23XI Racing	Toyota
11	22	Joey Logano	Team Penske	Ford
12	20	Christopher Bell	Joe Gibbs Racing	Toyota
13	41	Cole Custer	Stewart-Haas Racing	Ford
14	18	Kyle Busch	Joe Gibbs Racing	Toyota
15	2	Brad Keselowski	Team Penske	Ford
16	47	Ricky Stenhouse Jr.	JTG Daugherty Racing	Chevrolet
17	1	Kurt Busch	Chip Ganassi Racing	Chevrolet
18	14	Chase Briscoe (R)	Stewart-Haas Racing	Ford
19	19	Martin Truex Jr.	Joe Gibbs Racing	Toyota
20	77	Justin Haley (i)	Spire Motorsports	Chevrolet
21	51	Cody Ware (i)	Petty Ware Racing	Chevrolet
22	24	William Byron	Hendrick Motorsports	Chevrolet
23	52	Josh Bilicki	Rick Ware Racing	Ford
24	8	Tyler Reddick	Richard Childress Racing	Chevrolet
25	53	Garrett Smithley (i)	Rick Ware Racing	Chevrolet
26	10	Aric Almirola	Stewart-Haas Racing	Ford
27	12	Ryan Blaney	Team Penske	Ford
28	78	Scott Heckert	Live Fast Motorsports	Ford
29	00	Quin Houff	StarCom Racing	Chevrolet
30	17	Chris Buescher	Roush Fenway Racing	Ford
31	38	Anthony Alfredo (R)	Front Row Motorsports	Ford
32	21	Matt DiBenedetto	Wood Brothers Racing	Ford
33	6	Ryan Newman	Roush Fenway Racing	Ford
34	16	A. J. Allmendinger (i)	Kaulig Racing	Chevrolet
35	99	Daniel Suárez	Trackhouse Racing Team	Chevrolet
36	48	Alex Bowman	Hendrick Motorsports	Chevrolet
37	43	Erik Jones	Richard Petty Motorsports	Chevrolet
38	96	Ty Dillon (i)	Gaunt Brothers Racing	Toyota
39	15	James Davison	Rick Ware Racing	Chevrolet
40	66	Timmy Hill (i)	MBM Motorsports	Toyota
Official starting lineup

== Race ==
The seventy lap race was won by Joe Gibbs Racing driver Christopher Bell in a Toyota. A safety car period was called for rain which bunched the pack up, but the leaders changed onto dry tires rather than rain tires. Another caution period was called because Tyler Reddick's car caught fire. Bell claimed the lead when he overtook Joey Logano on the penultimate lap. It was Bell's first Cup Series victory. It was the first time since the 1950 NASCAR Grand National Series that a year's opening brace of races had maiden winners. Bell's teammate Hamlin finished in third behind Logano. Polesitter Elliott led most of the race but span after a collision with Kurt Busch and came 21st. Busch finished fourth ahead of Brad Keselowski. Both drivers gained positions by not making additional pit stops. Before this, Busch had fallen down the order after he span while leading, while Keselowski had also made mistakes. Harvick followed Keselowski, while A. J. Allmendinger took Kaulig Racing's best Cup Series result in seventh. Michael McDowell, who had won the 2021 Daytona 500 a week prior, recovered from a lap one puncture to finish eighth. Kyle Larson and Kyle Busch were both in the top five in the final twenty laps, but Larson spun into a tire barrier coming out of turn 7 and finished 30th, while Busch's team made a strategic error and was involved in a minor crash with Chris Buescher, finishing 35th.

Bell said he was "not overly shocked", but felt that "to win the first road course of the year is quite surprising". He also said that he "certainly knew we would be in contention or at least competitive today." He expressed the view that road racing "showcases talent".

The caution flag flown for rain during the last stage of the race was criticized as an "entertainment" caution, due to the surface being not being considered too wet to continue racing, as well as also altering the finish of the race preventing Elliott (who, alongside Kyle Busch, questioned the caution over the radio on NASCAR Race Hub's Radioactive segment, the show's team radio chatter highlights) from walking away easily with a win. The race had been declared a dry race at the start. Had the start been declared a wet race (teams must start on rain tires), NASCAR would not call a safety car situation if it dries, and rains again. A subsequent rule change in 2022 states if a road course race was not declared wet to start, a safety car is no longer automatically implemented when rain becomes an issue to prevent this situation. The rule is still used on ovals that can be run in the rain if the race is declared dry.

=== Stage Results ===
Stage One Laps: 16

Pos	No	Driver	Team	Manufacturer	Points
1	9	Chase Elliott	Hendrick Motorsports	Chevrolet	10
2	22	Joey Logano	Team Penske	Ford	9
3	11	Denny Hamlin	Joe Gibbs Racing	Toyota	8
4	2	Brad Keselowski	Team Penske	Ford	7
5	1	Kurt Busch	Chip Ganassi Racing	Chevrolet	6
6	5	Kyle Larson	Hendrick Motorsports	Chevrolet	5
7	19	Martin Truex Jr.	Joe Gibbs Racing	Toyota	4
8	3	Austin Dillon	Richard Childress Racing	Chevrolet	3
9	4	Kevin Harvick	Stewart-Haas Racing	Ford	2
10	17	Chris Buescher	Roush Fenway Racing	Ford	1
Official stage one results

Stage Two Laps: 18

Pos	No	Driver	Team	Manufacturer	Points
1	11	Denny Hamlin	Joe Gibbs Racing	Toyota	10
2	1	Kurt Busch	Chip Ganassi Racing	Chevrolet	9
3	22	Joey Logano	Team Penske	Ford	8
4	20	Christopher Bell	Joe Gibbs Racing	Toyota	7
5	19	Martin Truex Jr.	Joe Gibbs Racing	Toyota	6
6	9	Chase Elliott	Hendrick Motorsports	Chevrolet	5
7	24	William Byron	Hendrick Motorsports	Chevrolet	4
8	41	Cole Custer	Stewart-Haas Racing	Ford	3
9	16	A. J. Allmendinger (i)	Kaulig Racing	Chevrolet	0
10	18	Kyle Busch	Joe Gibbs Racing	Toyota	1
Official stage two results

=== Final Stage Results ===
Stage Three Laps: 36

Pos	Grid	No	Driver	Team	Manufacturer	Laps	Points
1	12	20	Christopher Bell	Joe Gibbs Racing	Toyota	70	47
2	11	22	Joey Logano	Team Penske	Ford	70	52
3	4	11	Denny Hamlin	Joe Gibbs Racing	Toyota	70	52
4	17	1	Kurt Busch	Chip Ganassi Racing	Chevrolet	70	48
5	15	2	Brad Keselowski	Team Penske	Ford	70	39
6	5	4	Kevin Harvick	Stewart-Haas Racing	Ford	70	33
7	34	16	A. J. Allmendinger (i)	Kaulig Racing	Chevrolet	70	0
8	2	34	Michael McDowell	Front Row Motorsports	Ford	70	29
9	6	37	Ryan Preece	JTG Daugherty Racing	Chevrolet	70	28
10	36	48	Alex Bowman	Hendrick Motorsports	Chevrolet	70	27
11	30	17	Chris Buescher	Roush Fenway Racing	Ford	70	27
12	19	19	Martin Truex Jr.	Joe Gibbs Racing	Toyota	70	35
13	13	41	Cole Custer	Stewart-Haas Racing	Ford	70	27
14	37	43	Erik Jones	Richard Petty Motorsports	Chevrolet	70	23
15	27	12	Ryan Blaney	Team Penske	Ford	70	22
16	35	99	Daniel Suárez	Trackhouse Racing Team	Chevrolet	70	21
17	26	10	Aric Almirola	Stewart-Haas Racing	Ford	70	20
18	16	47	Ricky Stenhouse Jr.	JTG Daugherty Racing	Chevrolet	70	19
19	38	96	Ty Dillon (i)	Gaunt Brothers Racing	Toyota	70	0
20	33	6	Ryan Newman	Roush Fenway Racing	Ford	70	17
21	1	9	Chase Elliott	Hendrick Motorsports	Chevrolet	70	31
22	31	38	Anthony Alfredo (R)	Front Row Motorsports	Ford	70	15
23	39	15	James Davison	Rick Ware Racing	Chevrolet	70	14
24	20	77	Justin Haley (i)	Spire Motorsports	Chevrolet	70	0
25	21	51	Cody Ware (i)	Petty Ware Racing	Chevrolet	70	0
26	10	23	Bubba Wallace	23XI Racing	Toyota	70	11
27	25	53	Garrett Smithley (i)	Rick Ware Racing	Chevrolet	70	0
28	28	78	Scott Heckert	Live Fast Motorsports	Ford	70	9
29	40	66	Timmy Hill (i)	MBM Motorsports	Toyota	70	0
30	8	5	Kyle Larson	Hendrick Motorsports	Chevrolet	70	12
31	7	7	Corey LaJoie	Spire Motorsports	Chevrolet	70	6
32	18	14	Chase Briscoe (R)	Stewart-Haas Racing	Ford	70	5
33	22	24	William Byron	Hendrick Motorsports	Chevrolet	69	8
34	3	3	Austin Dillon	Richard Childress Racing	Chevrolet	69	6
35	14	18	Kyle Busch	Joe Gibbs Racing	Toyota	69	3
36	23	52	Josh Bilicki	Rick Ware Racing	Ford	68	1
37	32	21	Matt DiBenedetto	Wood Brothers Racing	Ford	65	1
38	24	8	Tyler Reddick	Richard Childress Racing	Chevrolet	58	1
39	9	42	Ross Chastain	Chip Ganassi Racing	Chevrolet	26	1
40	29	00	Quin Houff	StarCom Racing	Chevrolet	3	1
Official race results

=== Race statistics ===
- Lead changes: 12 among 7 different drivers
- Cautions/Laps: 8 for 12
- Red flags: 0
- Time of race: 2 hours, 59 minutes and 32 seconds
- Average speed: 84.452 miles per hour (135.912 km/h)

== Media ==
=== Television ===
Fox Sports televised the race in the United States on Fox. Mike Joy, six-time Daytona winner Jeff Gordon and Clint Bowyer called the race from the broadcast booth. Jamie Little and Regan Smith handled pit road for the television side. Larry McReynolds provided insight from the Fox Sports studio in Charlotte.

Fox
Booth announcers	Pit reporters	In-race analyst
Lap-by-lap: Mike Joy; Color-commentator: Jeff Gordon; Color-commentator: Clint Bowyer	Jamie Little; Regan Smith	Larry McReynolds

=== Radio ===
MRN had the radio call for the race, which was also simulcast on Sirius XM NASCAR Radio.

MRN Radio
Booth announcers	Turn announcers	Pit reporters
Lead announcer: Alex Hayden; Announcer: Mike Bagley; Driver Expert: Rusty Wallace	Turns 2–6 (Infield section): Dave Moody; Turns 7–10: Kurt Becker; Turns 11–14: Dan Hubbard	Steve Post; Jason Toy

== Standings after the race ==
Drivers' Championship standings

	Pos	Driver	Points
1	1	Denny Hamlin	104
7	2	Joey Logano	92 (–12)
	3	Kevin Harvick	83 (–21)
6	4	Christopher Bell	82 (–22)
1	5	Chase Elliott	79 (–25)
1	6	Michael McDowell	75 (–29)
1	7	Ryan Preece	74 (–30)
12	8	Kurt Busch	65 (–39)
8	9	Austin Dillon	64 (–40)
6	10	Brad Keselowski	64 (–40)
4	11	Cole Custer	54 (–50)
5	12	Kyle Larson	53 (–51)
5	13	Bubba Wallace	52 (–52)
10	14	Martin Truex Jr.	47 (–57)
3	15	Corey LaJoie	38 (–66)
1	16	Ricky Stenhouse Jr.	38 (–66)
Official driver's standings

Manufacturers' Championship standings

	Pos	Manufacturer	Points
	1	Ford	75
1	2	Toyota	72 (–3)
1	3	Chevrolet	68 (–7)

- Note: Only the first 16 positions are included for the driver standings.

Previous race: 2021 Daytona 500	NASCAR Cup Series; 2021 season	Next race: 2021 Dixie Vodka 400
