= 2026 Straight Talk Wireless 500 =

NASCAR Cup Series race

Race details
- Race 4 of 36 in the 2026 NASCAR Cup Series
- Date: March 8, 2026
- Location: Phoenix Raceway in Avondale, Arizona
- Course: Permanent racing facility
- Course length: 1.000 miles (1.609 km)
- Distance: 312 laps, 312 mi (502.115 km)
- Weather: Clear 87 °F (31 °C)
- Average speed: 88.219 miles per hour (141.975 km/h)

Pole position
Driver	Joey Logano	Team Penske
- Time: 26.561

Most laps led
Driver	Christopher Bell	Joe Gibbs Racing
- Laps: 176

Fastest lap
Driver	Joey Logano	Team Penske
- Time: 27.402

Winner
No. 12	Ryan Blaney	Team Penske

Television in the United States
- Network: FS1
- Announcers: Mike Joy, Clint Bowyer, Kevin Harvick, Townsend Bell, and James Hinchcliffe (stage 2)
- Nielsen ratings: 2.841 million

Radio in the United States
- Radio: MRN
- Booth announcers: Alex Hayden, Mike Bagley, and Todd Gordon
- Turn announcers: Dan Hubbard (1 & 2) and Kurt Becker (3 & 4)

The 2026 Straight Talk Wireless 500 was a NASCAR Cup Series race held on March 8, 2026, at Phoenix Raceway in Avondale, Arizona. Contested over 312 laps on the 1.000 mi (1.609 km) oval, it was the fourth race of the 2026 NASCAR Cup Series season.

Ryan Blaney won the race. Christopher Bell finished 2nd, and Kyle Larson finished 3rd. Ty Gibbs and Denny Hamlin rounded out the top five, and Bubba Wallace, William Byron, Tyler Reddick, Michael McDowell, and Erik Jones rounded out the top ten.

== Report ==
=== Background ===
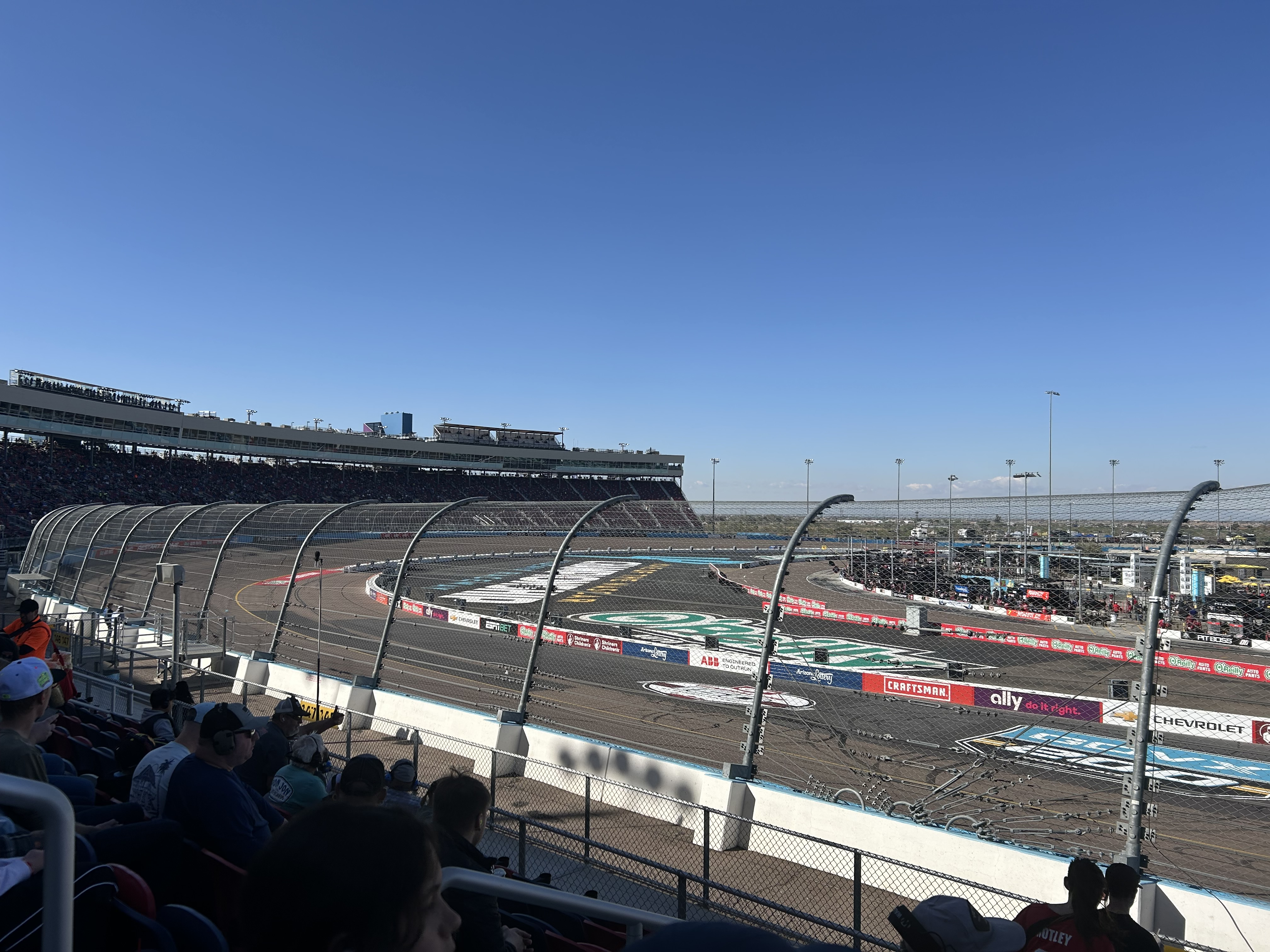
Phoenix Raceway, the track where the race was held.

Phoenix Raceway is a 1-mile, low-banked tri-oval race track located in Avondale, Arizona, near Phoenix. The motorsport track opened in 1964 and currently hosts two NASCAR race weekends annually including the final championship race between 2020 and 2025. Phoenix Raceway has also hosted the CART, IndyCar Series, USAC and the WeatherTech SportsCar Championship. The raceway is currently owned and operated by NASCAR.

Straight Talk Wireless was announced as the title sponsor for the 2026 race, which became the "Desert Double" weekend with the NTT IndyCar Series's Good Ranchers 250.

==== Entry list ====
- (R) denotes rookie driver.
- (i) denotes driver who is ineligible for series driver points.

No.	Driver	Team	Manufacturer
1	Ross Chastain	Trackhouse Racing	Chevrolet
2	Austin Cindric	Team Penske	Ford
3	Austin Dillon	Richard Childress Racing	Chevrolet
4	Noah Gragson	Front Row Motorsports	Ford
5	Kyle Larson	Hendrick Motorsports	Chevrolet
6	Brad Keselowski	RFK Racing	Ford
7	Daniel Suárez	Spire Motorsports	Chevrolet
8	Kyle Busch	Richard Childress Racing	Chevrolet
9	Chase Elliott	Hendrick Motorsports	Chevrolet
10	Ty Dillon	Kaulig Racing	Chevrolet
11	Denny Hamlin	Joe Gibbs Racing	Toyota
12	Ryan Blaney	Team Penske	Ford
16	A. J. Allmendinger	Kaulig Racing	Chevrolet
17	Chris Buescher	RFK Racing	Ford
19	Chase Briscoe	Joe Gibbs Racing	Toyota
20	Christopher Bell	Joe Gibbs Racing	Toyota
21	Josh Berry	Wood Brothers Racing	Ford
22	Joey Logano	Team Penske	Ford
23	Bubba Wallace	23XI Racing	Toyota
24	William Byron	Hendrick Motorsports	Chevrolet
34	Todd Gilliland	Front Row Motorsports	Ford
33	Austin Hill (i)	Richard Childress Racing	Chevrolet
35	Riley Herbst	23XI Racing	Toyota
38	Zane Smith	Front Row Motorsports	Ford
41	Cole Custer	Haas Factory Team	Chevrolet
42	John Hunter Nemechek	Legacy Motor Club	Toyota
43	Erik Jones	Legacy Motor Club	Toyota
45	Tyler Reddick	23XI Racing	Toyota
47	Ricky Stenhouse Jr.	Hyak Motorsports	Chevrolet
48	Anthony Alfredo (i)	Hendrick Motorsports	Chevrolet
51	Cody Ware	Rick Ware Racing	Chevrolet
54	Ty Gibbs	Joe Gibbs Racing	Toyota
60	Ryan Preece	RFK Racing	Ford
71	Michael McDowell	Spire Motorsports	Chevrolet
77	Carson Hocevar	Spire Motorsports	Chevrolet
88	Connor Zilisch (R)	Trackhouse Racing	Chevrolet
97	Shane van Gisbergen	Trackhouse Racing	Chevrolet
Official entry list

Alex Bowman, the original driver of the No. 48, was sidelined for the race due to vertigo sustained at Austin a week prior.

== Practice ==
Daniel Suárez was the fastest in the practice session with a time of 26.877 seconds and a speed of 133.943 mph (215.560 km/h).

=== Practice results ===
Pos	No.	Driver	Team	Manufacturer	Time	Speed
1	7	Daniel Suárez	Spire Motorsports	Chevrolet	26.877	133.943
2	77	Carson Hocevar	Spire Motorsports	Chevrolet	26.961	133.526
3	19	Chase Briscoe	Joe Gibbs Racing	Toyota	26.983	133.417
Official practice results

== Qualifying ==
Joey Logano scored the pole for the race with a time of 26.561 and a speed of 135.537 mph (218.126 km/h).

=== Qualifying results ===
Pos	No.	Driver	Team	Manufacturer	Time	Speed
1	22	Joey Logano	Team Penske	Ford	26.561	135.537
2	5	Kyle Larson	Hendrick Motorsports	Chevrolet	26.678	134.943
3	2	Austin Cindric	Team Penske	Ford	26.731	134.675
4	7	Daniel Suárez	Spire Motorsports	Chevrolet	26.744	134.610
5	12	Ryan Blaney	Team Penske	Ford	26.747	134.595
6	1	Ross Chastain	Trackhouse Racing	Chevrolet	26.757	134.544
7	77	Carson Hocevar	Spire Motorsports	Chevrolet	26.758	134.539
8	45	Tyler Reddick	23XI Racing	Toyota	26.787	134.394
9	24	William Byron	Hendrick Motorsports	Chevrolet	26.791	134.373
10	21	Josh Berry	Wood Brothers Racing	Ford	26.814	134.258
11	11	Denny Hamlin	Joe Gibbs Racing	Toyota	26.819	134.233
12	20	Christopher Bell	Joe Gibbs Racing	Toyota	26.836	134.148
13	60	Ryan Preece	RFK Racing	Ford	26.837	134.143
14	54	Ty Gibbs	Joe Gibbs Racing	Toyota	26.840	134.128
15	42	John Hunter Nemechek	Legacy Motor Club	Toyota	26.858	134.038
16	71	Michael McDowell	Spire Motorsports	Chevrolet	26.862	134.018
17	17	Chris Buescher	RFK Racing	Ford	26.875	133.953
18	97	Shane van Gisbergen	Trackhouse Racing	Chevrolet	26.878	133.939
19	88	Connor Zilisch (R)	Trackhouse Racing	Chevrolet	26.882	133.919
20	19	Chase Briscoe	Joe Gibbs Racing	Toyota	26.897	133.844
21	47	Ricky Stenhouse Jr.	Hyak Motorsports	Chevrolet	26.899	133.834
22	35	Riley Herbst	23XI Racing	Toyota	26.902	133.819
23	16	A. J. Allmendinger	Kaulig Racing	Chevrolet	26.905	133.804
24	38	Zane Smith	Front Row Motorsports	Ford	26.906	133.799
25	3	Austin Dillon	Richard Childress Racing	Chevrolet	26.948	133.591
26	9	Chase Elliott	Hendrick Motorsports	Chevrolet	26.956	133.551
27	33	Austin Hill (i)	Richard Childress Racing	Chevrolet	26.959	133.536
28	23	Bubba Wallace	23XI Racing	Toyota	27.021	133.230
29	8	Kyle Busch	Richard Childress Racing	Chevrolet	27.037	133.151
30	34	Todd Gilliland	Front Row Motorsports	Ford	27.041	133.131
31	48	Anthony Alfredo (i)	Hendrick Motorsports	Chevrolet	27.088	132.900
32	43	Erik Jones	Legacy Motor Club	Toyota	27.094	132.871
33	10	Ty Dillon	Kaulig Racing	Chevrolet	27.133	132.680
34	51	Cody Ware	Rick Ware Racing	Chevrolet	27.182	132.441
35	4	Noah Gragson	Front Row Motorsports	Ford	27.207	132.319
36	41	Cole Custer	Haas Factory Team	Chevrolet	27.516	130.833
37	6	Brad Keselowski	RFK Racing	Ford	0.000	0.000
Official qualifying results

== Race ==
=== Race results ===
==== Stage Results ====
Stage One Laps: 60

Pos	No	Driver	Team	Manufacturer	Points
1	12	Ryan Blaney	Team Penske	Ford	10
2	20	Christopher Bell	Joe Gibbs Racing	Toyota	9
3	22	Joey Logano	Team Penske	Ford	8
4	45	Tyler Reddick	23XI Racing	Toyota	7
5	11	Denny Hamlin	Joe Gibbs Racing	Toyota	6
6	2	Austin Cindric	Team Penske	Ford	5
7	7	Daniel Suárez	Spire Motorsports	Chevrolet	4
8	54	Ty Gibbs	Joe Gibbs Racing	Toyota	3
9	24	William Byron	Hendrick Motorsports	Chevrolet	2
10	1	Ross Chastain	Trackhouse Racing	Chevrolet	1

Stage Two Laps: 125

Pos	No	Driver	Team	Manufacturer	Points
1	20	Christopher Bell	Joe Gibbs Racing	Toyota	10
2	11	Denny Hamlin	Joe Gibbs Racing	Toyota	9
3	22	Joey Logano	Team Penske	Ford	8
4	17	Chris Buescher	RFK Racing	Ford	7
5	23	Bubba Wallace	23XI Racing	Toyota	6
6	2	Austin Cindric	Team Penske	Ford	5
7	77	Carson Hocevar	Spire Motorsports	Chevrolet	4
8	45	Tyler Reddick	23XI Racing	Toyota	3
9	5	Kyle Larson	Hendrick Motorsports	Chevrolet	2
10	34	Todd Gilliland	Front Row Motorsports	Ford	1

=== Final Stage Results ===
Stage Three Laps: 127

Pos	Grid	No	Driver	Team	Manufacturer	Laps	Points
1	5	12	Ryan Blaney	Team Penske	Ford	312	65
2	12	20	Christopher Bell	Joe Gibbs Racing	Toyota	312	54
3	2	5	Kyle Larson	Hendrick Motorsports	Chevrolet	312	36
4	14	54	Ty Gibbs	Joe Gibbs Racing	Toyota	312	36
5	11	11	Denny Hamlin	Joe Gibbs Racing	Toyota	312	47
6	28	23	Bubba Wallace	23XI Racing	Toyota	312	37
7	9	24	William Byron	Hendrick Motorsports	Chevrolet	312	32
8	8	45	Tyler Reddick	23XI Racing	Toyota	312	39
9	16	71	Michael McDowell	Spire Motorsports	Chevrolet	312	28
10	32	43	Erik Jones	Legacy Motor Club	Toyota	312	27
11	18	97	Shane van Gisbergen	Trackhouse Racing	Chevrolet	312	26
12	30	34	Todd Gilliland	Front Row Motorsports	Ford	312	26
13	13	60	Ryan Preece	RFK Racing	Ford	312	24
14	17	17	Chris Buescher	RFK Racing	Ford	312	30
15	37	5	Brad Keselowski	RFK Racing	Ford	312	22
16	25	3	Austin Dillon	Richard Childress Racing	Chevrolet	312	21
17	29	8	Kyle Busch	Richard Childress Racing	Chevrolet	312	20
18	22	35	Riley Herbst	23XI Racing	Toyota	312	19
19	23	16	A. J. Allmendinger	Kaulig Racing	Chevrolet	312	18
20	7	77	Carson Hocevar	Spire Motorsports	Chevrolet	312	21
21	27	33	Austin Hill (i)	Richard Childress Racing	Chevrolet	312	0
22	21	47	Ricky Stenhouse Jr.	Hyak Motorsports	Chevrolet	312	15
23	26	9	Chase Elliott	Hendrick Motorsports	Chevrolet	312	14
24	34	51	Cody Ware	Rick Ware Racing	Ford	312	13
25	15	42	John Hunter Nemechek	Legacy Motor Club	Toyota	312	12
26	33	10	Ty Dillon	Kaulig Racing	Chevrolet	311	11
27	24	38	Zane Smith	Front Row Motorsports	Ford	294	10
28	6	1	Ross Chastain	Trackhouse Racing	Chevrolet	286	10
29	19	88	Connor Zilisch (R)	Trackhouse Racing	Chevrolet	281	8
30	4	7	Daniel Suárez	Spire Motorsports	Chevrolet	254	11
31	1	22	Joey Logano	Team Penske	Ford	253	23
32	10	21	Josh Berry	Wood Brothers Racing	Ford	253	5
33	31	48	Anthony Alfredo (i)	Hendrick Motorsports	Chevrolet	217	0
34	3	2	Austin Cindric	Team Penske	Ford	216	13
35	36	41	Cole Custer	Haas Factory Team	Chevrolet	159	2
36	35	4	Noah Gragson	Front Row Motorsports	Ford	155	1
37	20	19	Chase Briscoe	Joe Gibbs Racing	Toyota	131	1
Official race results

=== Race statistics ===
- Lead changes: 23 among 8 different drivers
- Cautions/Laps: 12 for 86
- Red flags: 0
- Time of race: 3 hours, 32 minutes and 12 seconds
- Average speed: 88.219 miles per hour (141.975 km/h)

== Media ==
=== Television ===
Fox Sports covered the race at the Phoenix Raceway. Mike Joy, Clint Bowyer, and nine-time Phoenix winner Kevin Harvick called the race from the broadcast booth, with Townsend Bell and James Hinchcliffe joining for Stage 2. Jamie Little and Regan Smith handled pit road for the television side, and Larry McReynolds provided insight on-site during the race.

FS1
Booth announcers	Pit reporters	In-race analyst
Lap-by-lap: Mike Joy; Color-commentator: Clint Bowyer; Color-commentator: Kevin Harvick; Color-commentator: Townsend Bell (Stage 2); Color-commentator: James Hinchcliffe (Stage 2)	Jamie Little; Regan Smith	Larry McReynolds

=== Radio ===
MRN covered the radio action for the race which was also simulcasted on Sirius XM NASCAR Radio. Alex Hayden, Mike Bagley, and former crew chief Todd Gordon called the race when the field races past the start/finish line. Dan Hubbard called the action from turns 1 & 2, and Kurt Becker called the action from turns 3 & 4. Pit lane was manned by Lead MRN Pit Reporter Steve Post and Chris Wilner.

MRN
Booth announcers	Turn announcers	Pit reporters
Lead announcer: Alex Hayden; Announcer: Mike Bagley; Announcer: Todd Gordon	Turns 1 & 2: Dan Hubbard; Turns 3 & 4: Kurt Becker	Steve Post; Chris Wilner

== Standings after the race ==
Drivers' Championship standings

	Pos	Driver	Points
	1	Tyler Reddick	225
2	2	Ryan Blaney	165 (–60)
1	3	Bubba Wallace	153 (–72)
1	4	Chase Elliott	128 (–97)
	5	Shane van Gisbergen	116 (–109)
18	6	Christopher Bell	113 (–112)
1	7	Joey Logano	113 (–112)
1	8	Michael McDowell	111 (–114)
2	9	Chris Buescher	111 (–114)
5	10	Kyle Larson	109 (–116)
2	11	William Byron	108 (–117)
11	12	Denny Hamlin	107 (–118)
5	13	A. J. Allmendinger	104 (–121)
4	14	Carson Hocevar	103 (–122)
2	15	Ty Gibbs	101 (–124)
4	16	Brad Keselowski	100 (–125)
Official driver's standings

Manufacturers' Championship standings

	Pos	Manufacturer	Points
	1	Toyota	200
1	2	Ford	148 (–52)
1	3	Chevrolet	138 (–62)

- Note: Only the first 16 positions are included for the driver standings.

Previous race: 2026 DuraMAX Texas Grand Prix	NASCAR Cup Series; 2026 season	Next race: 2026 Pennzoil 400
