= Anthony Alfredo =

American racing driver (born 1999)

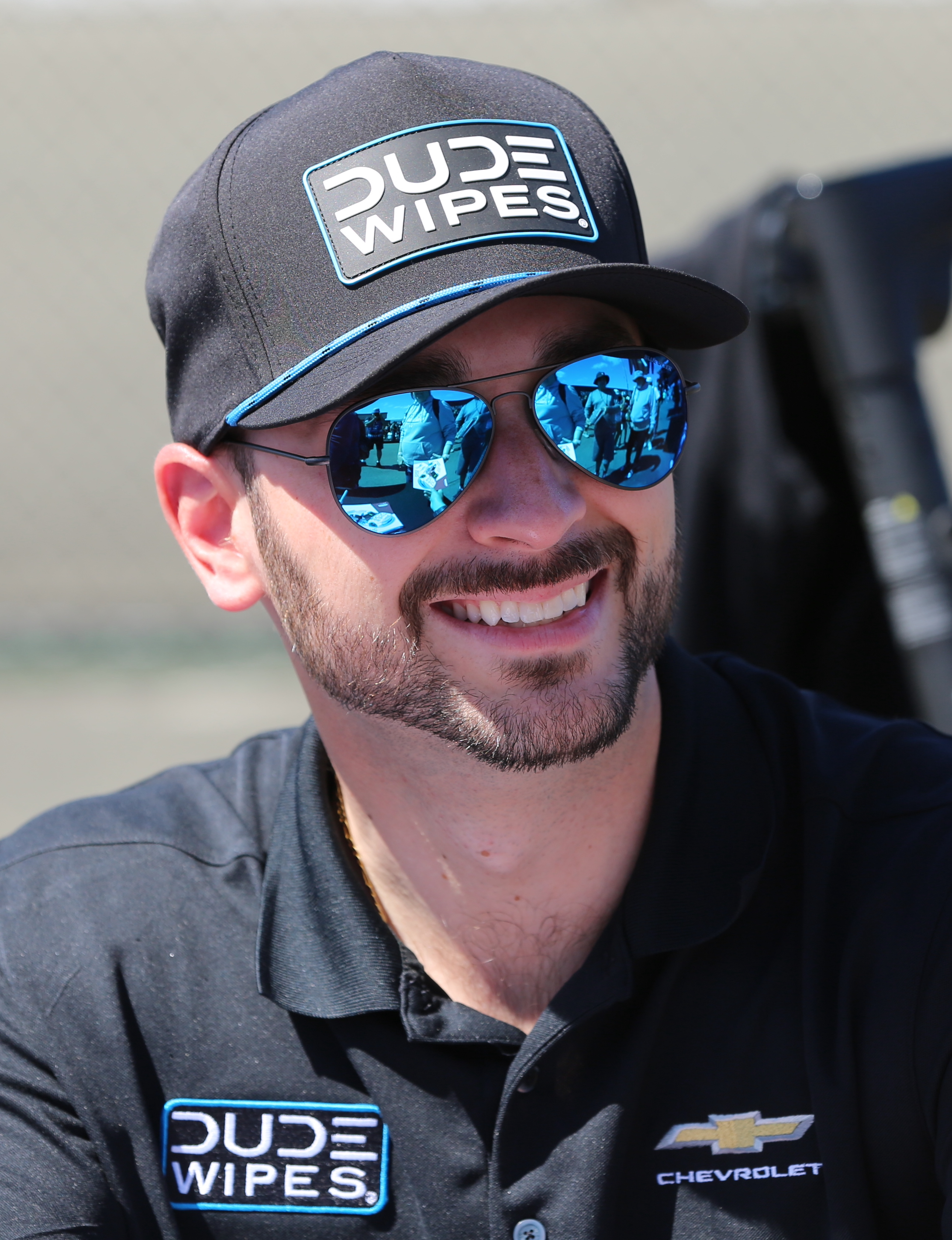
- Alfredo at Sonoma Raceway in 2026
- Born: Anthony Francis Alfredo; March 31, 1999 (age 27); Ridgefield, Connecticut, U.S.
- Height: 5 ft 11 in (1.80 m)
- Weight: 185 lb (84 kg)
- Achievements: 2016 Southeast Limited Late Model Series Champion; 2017 Fall Brawl Winner (LMSC)

NASCAR Cup Series career
- 44 races run over 5 years
- 2026 position: 53rd
- Best finish: 30th (2021)
- First race: 2021 Daytona 500 (Daytona)
- Last race: 2026 Straight Talk Wireless 500 (Phoenix)
Wins	Top tens	Poles
0	2	0

NASCAR O'Reilly Auto Parts Series career
- 184 races run over 6 years
- Car no., team: No. 96 (Viking Motorsports)
- 2026 position: 16th
- Best finish: 15th (2022, 2024)
- First race: 2020 Production Alliance Group 300 (California)
- Last race: 2026 O'Reilly Auto Parts 300 (Homestead)
Wins	Top tens	Poles
0	32	1

NASCAR FedEx Freight Truck Series career
- 13 races run over 1 year
- 2019 position: 22nd
- Best finish: 22nd (2019)
- First race: 2019 Ultimate Tailgating 200 (Atlanta)
- Last race: 2019 Ford EcoBoost 200 (Homestead)
Wins	Top tens	Poles
0	2	0

ARCA Menards Series career
- 3 races run over 2 years
- Best finish: 50th (2018)
- First race: 2018 PapaNicholas Coffee 150 (Gateway)
- Last race: 2020 VizCom 200 (Michigan)
Wins	Top tens	Poles
0	2	0

ARCA Menards Series East career
- 14 races run over 1 year
- Best finish: 5th (2018)
- First race: 2018 New Smyrna 175 (New Smyrna)
- Last race: 2018 Crosley 125 (Dover)
- First win: 2018 Who's Your Driver Twin 100s (South Boston)
Wins	Top tens	Poles
1	9	1
- Statistics up to date as of November 8, 2026.

Anthony Francis Alfredo (born March 31, 1999), nicknamed "Fast Pasta", is an American professional stock car racing driver. He competes full-time in the NASCAR O'Reilly Auto Parts Series, driving the No. 96 Chevrolet Camaro SS for Viking Motorsports.

Alfredo is also a simulator testing driver for Hendrick Motorsports.

== Racing career ==
=== Early career ===
After becoming a racing fan and watching on television, Alfredo started his racing career in go-kart racing. After a half-decade hiatus to play other sports, he jumped back into racing in 2014, piloting Legends cars. He later signed a deal with noted short track racer Lee Faulk to run limited late model races with his team, winning the 2016 Southeast Limited Late Model Series Pro Division championship. Alfredo was selected to drive for Dale Earnhardt Jr.'s JR Motorsports (JRM) team in the Late Model division of the CARS Tour in 2017, and finished second in the championship to his teammate, Josh Berry. He continued to race late models stocks in 2018, teaming up with Peyton Sellers.

=== ARCA ===
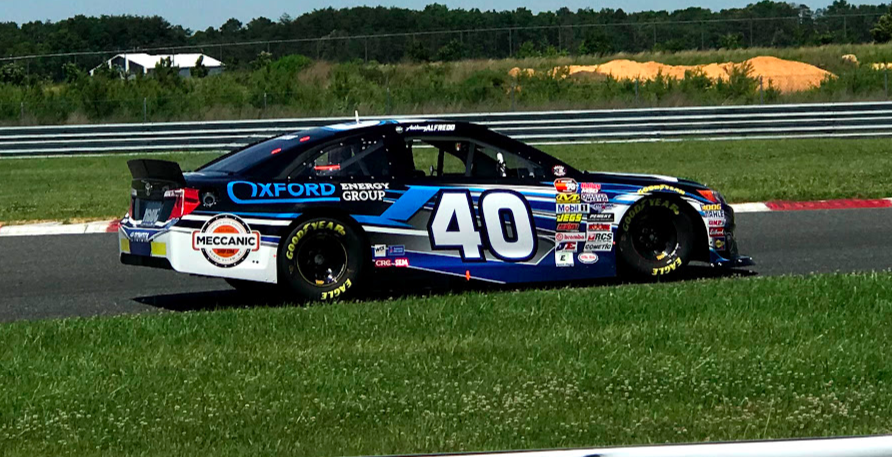
Alfredo's K&N East car at New Jersey Motorsports Park in 2018

Alfredo signed with MDM Motorsports to run the entirety of the 2018 NASCAR K&N Pro Series East schedule. He earned his first win at South Boston Speedway in March, He was in position to win late at Langley Speedway in April until Tyler Dippel used a bump-and-run tactic to secure the win. As part of MDM Motorsports, Alfredo entered two ARCA Racing Series events in 2018, scoring the best finish of seventh at Gateway Motorsports Park.

=== NASCAR Gander Outdoors Truck Series ===
On December 6, 2018, it was announced that Alfredo would join the Truck Series in the No. 17 truck for DGR-Crosley in 2019, starting at Atlanta. In his Truck debut, he finished in seventeenth after qualifying in 27th.

=== NASCAR O'Reilly Auto Parts Series ===
On December 3, 2019, Richard Childress Racing announced Alfredo would drive the No. 21 for the team in the NASCAR Xfinity Series in 2020, sharing the car with Myatt Snider and Kaz Grala. At the Kansas Speedway race in October, Alfredo ran in the top five for much of the day before being involved in a wreck with Justin Allgaier on a late restart that caused his car to hit the wall and flip over; Alfredo was unharmed in the crash. Later in the month at Texas Motor Speedway, he scored a career-best finish of third after battling for the lead but was unable to take the position.

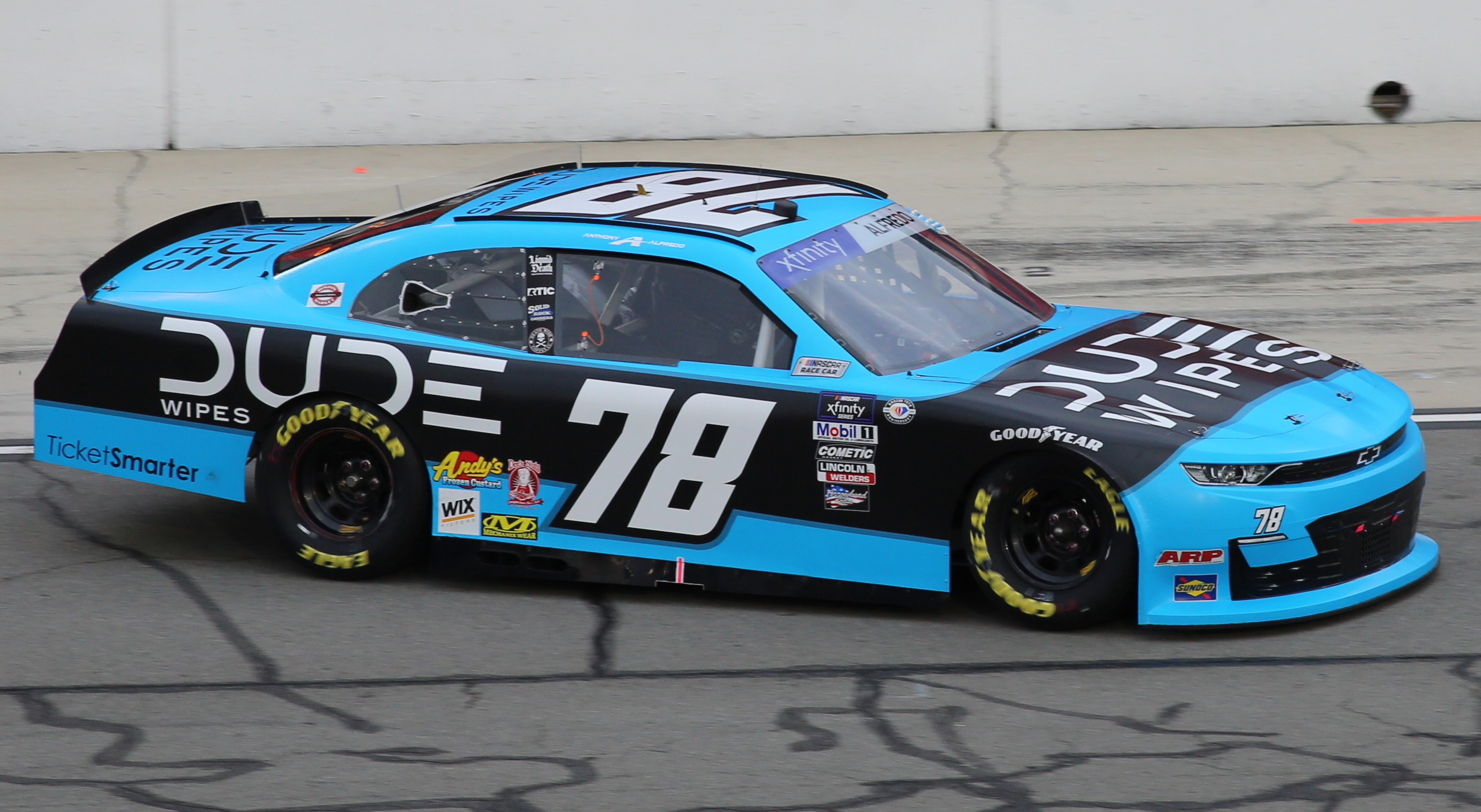
Alfredo at Auto Club Speedway in 2023

On December 16, it was announced that Alfredo would drive full-time for Our Motorsports in their No. 23 Chevrolet in the Xfinity Series in 2022. On January 11, 2023, it was announced that Alfredo would drive the No. 78 B. J. McLeod Motorsports Chevrolet in the Xfinity Series. On November 14, 2023, it was announced that Alfredo would not return to the team in a press statement by team owner B. J. McLeod. On December 7, 2023, it was announced Alfredo rejoined Our Motorsports in the No. 5 full-time in 2024.

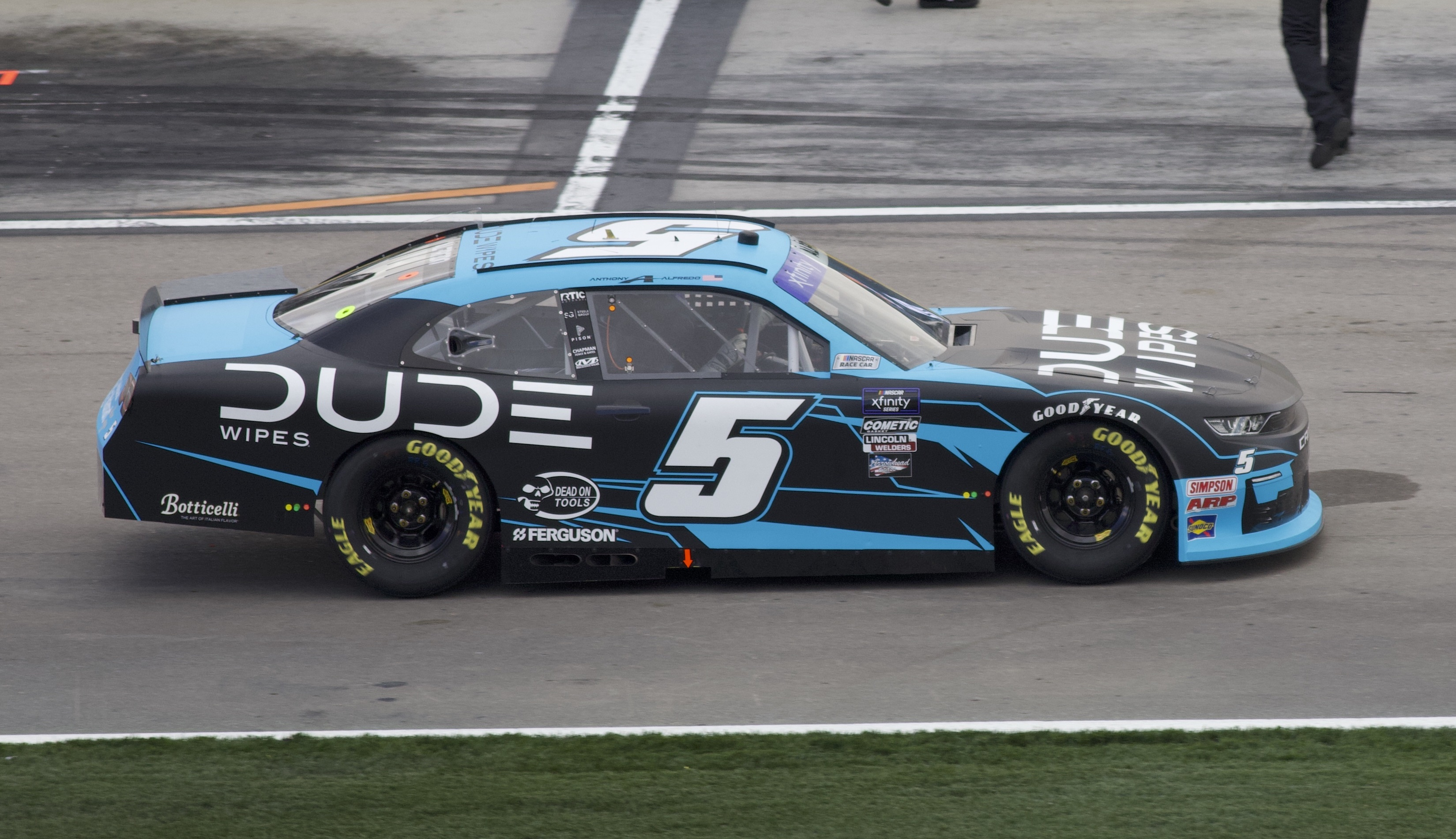
Alfredo's No. 5 car at Las Vegas Motor Speedway in 2024

In the 2024 season finale at Phoenix, Alfredo was parked for two laps by NASCAR for reckless driving after right rear hooking fellow driver Stefan Parsons in retaliation for Parsons forcing Alfredo into the wall. Three days later, it was announced that NASCAR had fined Alfredo US$25,000 and docked him 25 driver points.

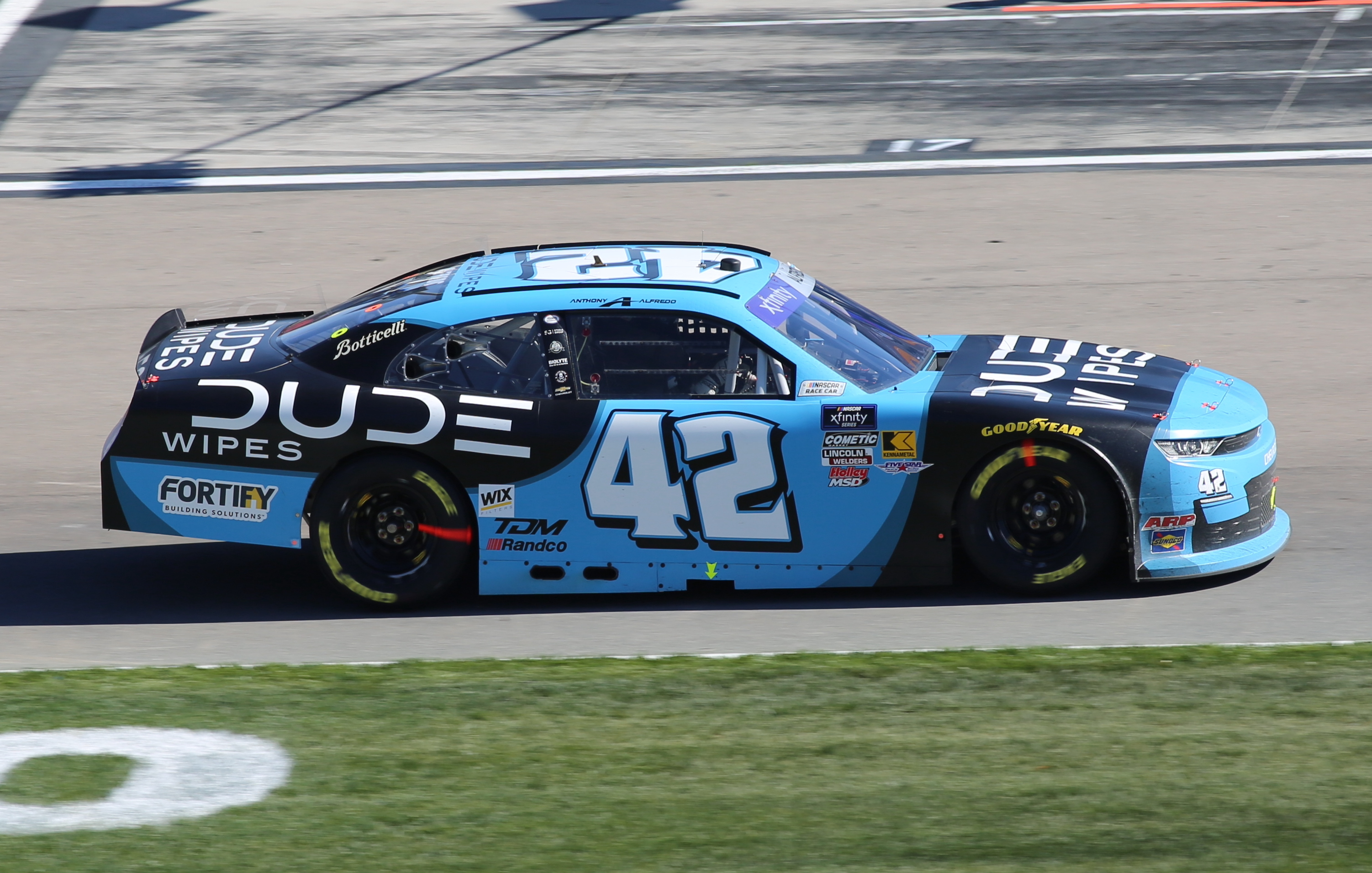
Alfredo's No. 42 car at Las Vegas Motor Speedway in 2025

On January 14, 2025, it was announced that Alfredo would run full-time in the Xfinity Series in 2025, driving the No. 42 Chevrolet for Young's Motorsports. He started the season with a 22nd-place DNF at Daytona.

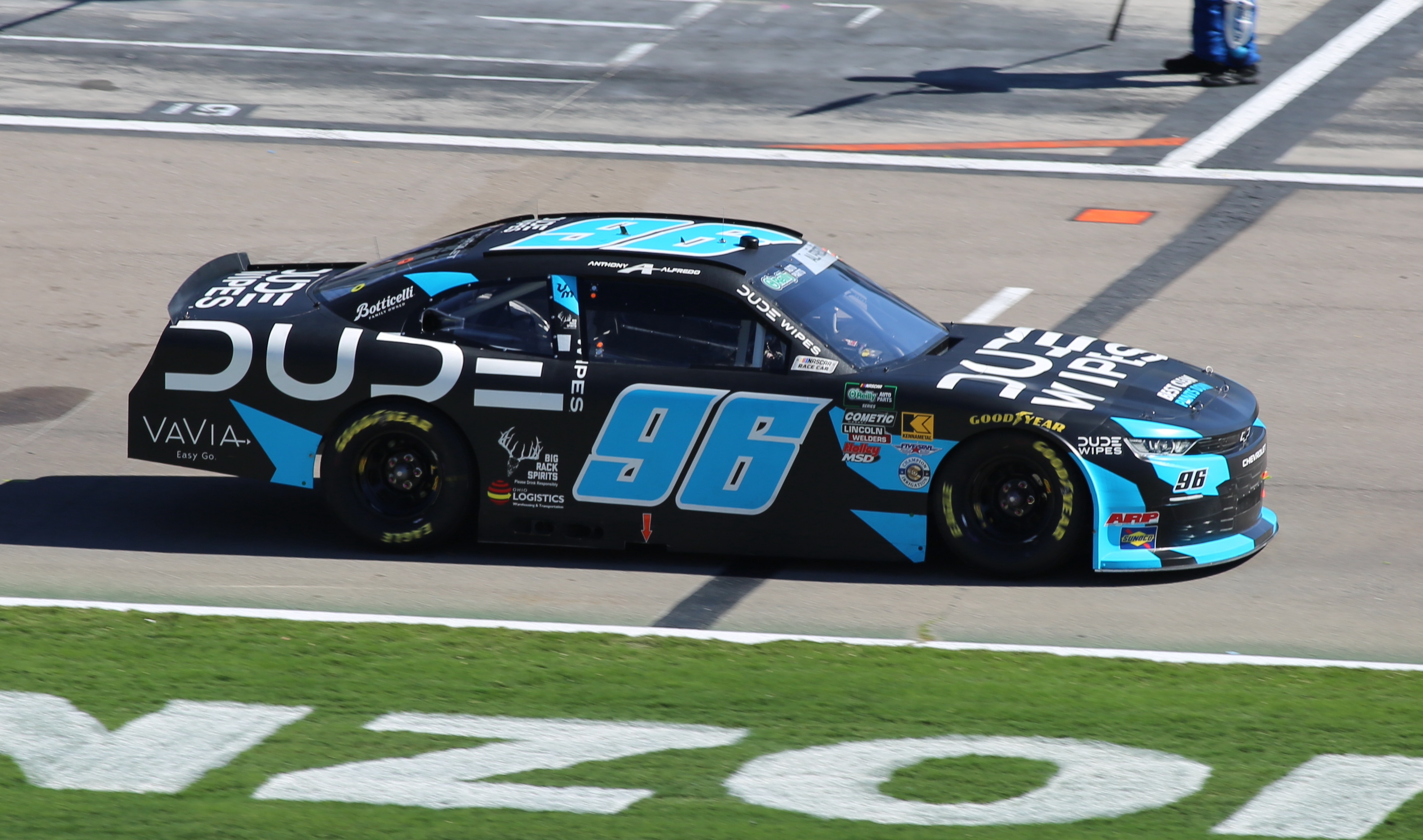
Alfredo's No. 96 car at Las Vegas Motor Speedway in 2026

On December 4, 2025, it was announced that Alfredo would run full-time in the O'Reilly Auto Parts Series in 2026, driving the No. 96 Chevrolet for Viking Motorsports. After failing to qualify for Viking, he started the season with an 11th-place finish at Daytona for Alpha Prime Racing. At the Coronado Street Course race in June, Alfredo ran in the top ten for much of the day before being involved in a massive wreck with Sam Mayer on a late restart that caused his car to hit the concrete wall; Alfredo said 'it was the hardest hit of his life' and was unharmed in the crash. The following week at Sonoma, he won his first career stage.

=== NASCAR Cup Series ===
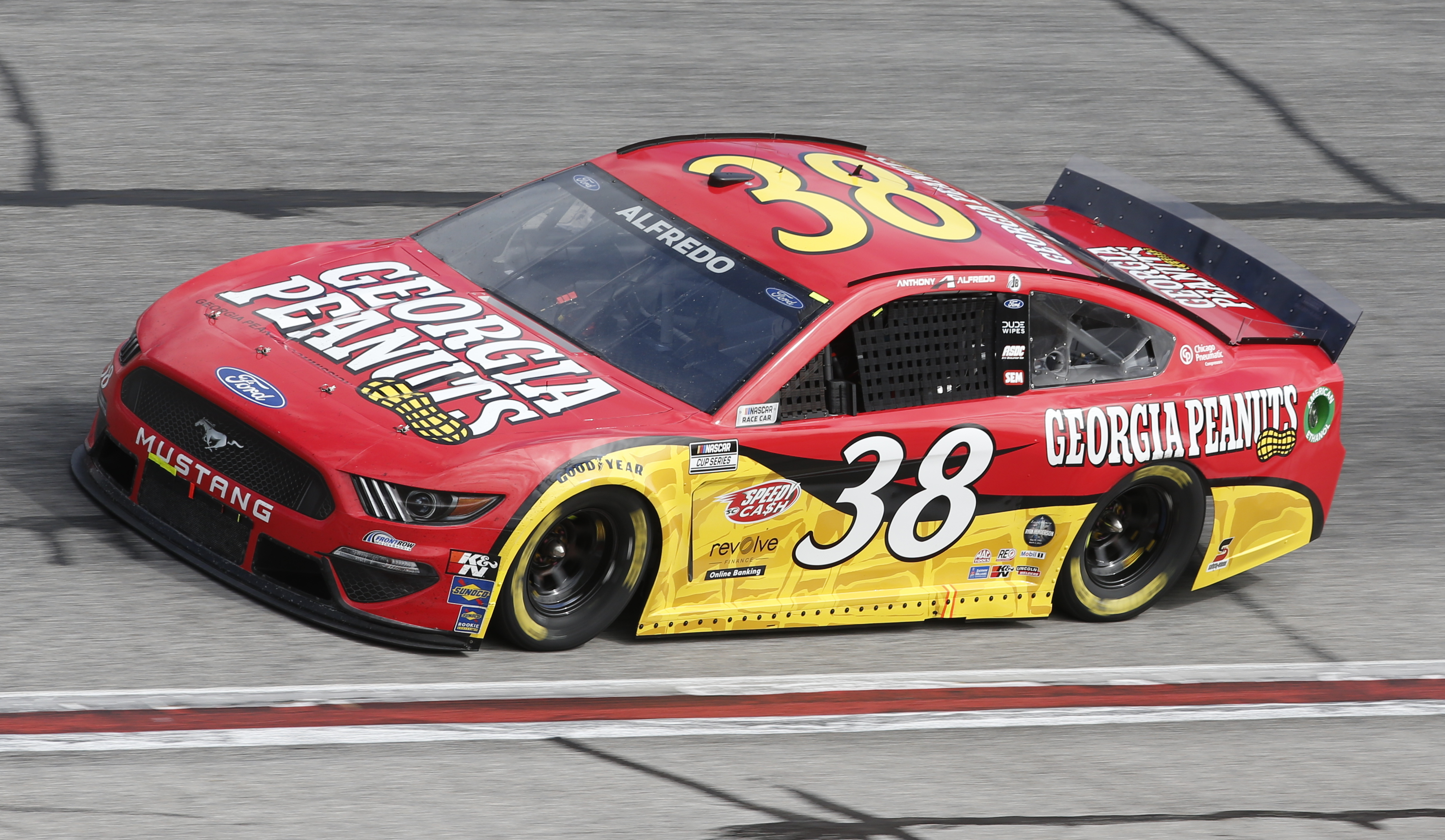
Alfredo's Cup Series car at Atlanta Motor Speedway in 2021

On January 6, 2021, Front Row Motorsports announced that Alfredo would drive the No. 38 car full-time in the NASCAR Cup Series, replacing previous driver John Hunter Nemechek. He finished 30th in the final standings with just one top-ten finish. On November 9, FRM announced that Alfredo would not return to the team in 2022.

For the 2024 season, Beard Motorsports signed Alfredo to drive the No. 62. Alfredo finished 27th at the 2024 Daytona 500 and scored a career-best sixth-place finish at Talladega.

For the 2025 season, Beard signed Alfredo to drive the No. 62 for multiple races. After failing to qualify for the Daytona 500, Alfredo would show a strong performance at Talladega, by leading nineteen laps, but finished 28th after the disqualifications of Joey Logano and Ryan Preece.

Alfredo originally qualified for the 2026 Daytona 500, beating out B. J. McLeod and J. J. Yeley in Duel 2, but was disqualified after failing inspection and subsequently disallowed from entering the race.

== Personal life ==
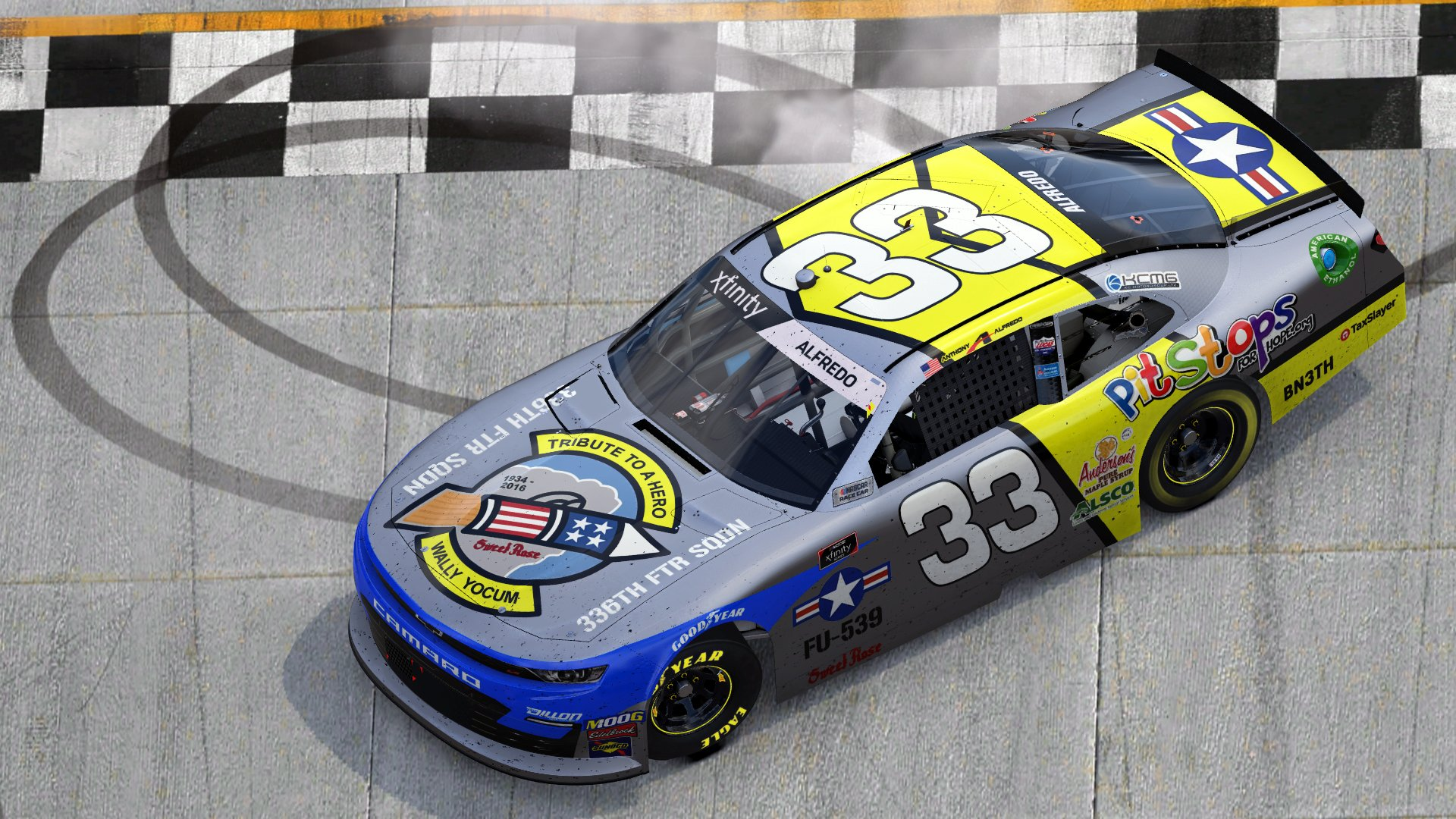
Alfredo celebrates winning at Dover International Speedway in Saturday Night Thunder, part of the eNASCAR iRacing Pro Invitational Series in 2020.

Alfredo has experience in the commercial building field. He is also an avid video game player and has set up his own social media channels for others to view his gaming.

== Motorsports career results ==
=== Career summary ===
Season	Series	Team	Car No.	Races	Wins	Top fives	Top tens	Poles	Laps led	Position	Points	Ref
2016	CARS Late Model Tour	Lee Faulk Racing	5A	1	0	0	1	0	0	43rd	24	
2017	CARS Late Model Tour	JR Motorsports	8A	13	2	8	11	0	13	2nd	344	
2018	NASCAR K&N Pro Series East	MDM Motorsports	40	14	1	4	9	1	72	5th	480	
2018	ARCA Racing Series	MDM Motorsports	40	2	0	0	1	0	0	50th	410	
2019	NASCAR Gander Outdoors Truck Series	DGR-Crosley	15	10	0	0	2	0	3	22nd	240	
2019	NASCAR Gander Outdoors Truck Series	DGR-Crosley	17	2	0	0	0	0	0	22nd	240	
2019	NASCAR Gander Outdoors Truck Series	DGR-Crosley	54	1	0	0	0	0	0	22nd	240	
2020	NASCAR Xfinity Series	Richard Childress Racing	21	19	0	2	9	0	15	18th	543	
2020	ARCA Menards Series	DGR-Crosley	17	1	0	1	1	0	0	52nd	39	
2021	NASCAR Cup Series	Front Row Motorsports	38	36	0	0	1	0	5	30th	352	
2022	NASCAR Xfinity Series	Our Motorsports	23	33	0	1	4	1	15	15th	633	
2023	NASCAR Cup Series	Live Fast Motorsports	78	2	0	0	0	0	0	62nd	0	
2023	NASCAR Xfinity Series	B. J. McLeod Motorsports	78	33	0	0	2	0	24	20th	454	
2024	NASCAR Cup Series	Beard Motorsports	62	3	0	0	1	0	4	47th	0	
2024	NASCAR Xfinity Series	Our Motorsports	5	33	0	2	7	0	6	15th	616	
2025	NASCAR Cup Series	Beard Motorsports	62	2	0	0	0	0	21	51st	0	
2025	NASCAR Xfinity Series	Young's Motorsports	42	33	0	0	1	0	1	24th	471	
2026	NASCAR Cup Series	Beard Motorsports	62	0	0	0	0	0	—*	—*	0	
2026	NASCAR Cup Series	Hendrick Motorsports	48	1	0	0	0	0	0	—*	0	
2026	NASCAR O'Reilly Auto Parts Series	Viking Motorsports	96	32	0	0	0	0	0	—*	—*	
2026	NASCAR O'Reilly Auto Parts Series	Alpha Prime Racing	4	1	0	0	0	0	0	—*	—*	

=== NASCAR ===
(key) (Bold – Pole position awarded by qualifying time. Italics – Pole position earned by points standings or practice time. * – Most laps led.)

==== Cup Series ====
NASCAR Cup Series results
Year	Team	No.	Make	1	2	3	4	5	6	7	8	9	10	11	12	13	14	15	16	17	18	19	20	21	22	23	24	25	26	27	28	29	30	31	32	33	34	35	36	NCSC	Pts	Ref
2021	Front Row Motorsports	38	Ford	DAY; 32	DRC; 22	HOM; 24	LVS; 24	PHO; 37	ATL; 27	BRD; 39	MAR; 26	RCH; 31	TAL; 12	KAN; 23	DAR; 26	DOV; 28	COA; 18	CLT; 25	SON; 31	NSH; 17	POC; 26	POC; 34	ROA; 37	ATL; 26	NHA; 32	GLN; 26	IRC; 38	MCH; 34	DAY; 26	DAR; 24	RCH; 26	BRI; 35	LVS; 27	TAL; 10	ROV; 26	TEX; 29	KAN; 38	MAR; 20	PHO; 34	30th	352	
2023	Live Fast Motorsports	78	Chevy	DAY	CAL	LVS	PHO	ATL	COA	RCH; 33	BRD	MAR; 35	TAL	DOV	KAN	DAR	CLT	GTW	SON	NSH	CSC	ATL	NHA	POC	RCH	MCH	IRC	GLN	DAY	DAR	KAN	BRI	TEX	TAL	ROV	LVS	HOM	MAR	PHO	62nd	0^{1}	
2024	Beard Motorsports	62	Chevy	DAY; 27	ATL	LVS	PHO	BRI	COA	RCH	MAR	TEX	TAL; 6	DOV	KAN	DAR	CLT	GTW	SON	IOW	NHA	NSH	CSC	POC	IND	RCH	MCH	DAY	DAR	ATL	GLN	BRI	KAN	TAL; 24	ROV	LVS	HOM	MAR	PHO	47th	0^{1}	
2025	Beard Motorsports	62	Chevy	DAY; DNQ	ATL	COA	PHO	LVS	HOM	MAR	DAR	BRI	TAL; 28	TEX	KAN	CLT	NSH	MCH	MXC	POC	ATL	CSC	SON	DOV	IND	IOW	GLN	RCH	DAY	DAR	GTW	BRI	NHA	KAN	ROV	LVS	TAL; 21	MAR	PHO	51st	0^{1}	
2026	Beard Motorsports	62	Chevy	DAY; DNQ	ATL	COA																																		53rd	0^{1}	
2026	Hendrick Motorsports	48	Chevy				PHO; 33	LVS	DAR	MAR	BRI	KAN	TAL	TEX	GLN	CLT	NSH	MCH	POC	COR	SON	CHI	ATL	NWS	IND	IOW	RCH	NHA	DAY	DAR	GTW	BRI	KAN	LVS	CLT	PHO	TAL	MAR	HOM	53rd	0^{1}	

===== Daytona 500 =====
Year	Team	Manufacturer	Start	Finish
2021	Front Row Motorsports	Ford	36	32
2024	Beard Motorsports	Chevrolet	39	27
2025	Beard Motorsports	Chevrolet	DNQ	
2026	Beard Motorsports	Chevrolet	DNQ	

==== O'Reilly Auto Parts Series ====
NASCAR O'Reilly Auto Parts Series results
Year	Team	No.	Make	1	2	3	4	5	6	7	8	9	10	11	12	13	14	15	16	17	18	19	20	21	22	23	24	25	26	27	28	29	30	31	32	33	NOAPSC	Pts	Ref
2020	Richard Childress Racing	21	Chevy	DAY	LVS	CAL; 6	PHO	DAR; 14	CLT	BRI	ATL; 10	HOM; 4	HOM; 11	TAL; 6	POC	IRC; 20	KEN; 6	KEN; 6	TEX; 27	KAN	ROA	DRC	DOV; 11	DOV; 13	DAY; 21	DAR; 27	RCH	RCH	BRI; 6	LVS; 8	TAL; 12	ROV	KAN; 29	TEX; 3	MAR	PHO	18th	543	
2022	Our Motorsports	23	Chevy	DAY; 7	CAL; 5	LVS; 17	PHO; 37	ATL; 16	COA; 13	RCH; 12	MAR; 14	TAL; 6	DOV; 15	DAR; 15	TEX; 32	CLT; 33	**PIR**; 31	NSH; 20	ROA; 23	ATL; 14	NHA; 29	POC; 16	IRC; 18	MCH; 14	GLN; 18	DAY; 32	DAR; 37	KAN; 18	BRI; 13	TEX; 19	TAL; 16	ROV; 12	LVS; 10	HOM; 18	MAR; 21	PHO; 35	15th	633	
2023	B. J. McLeod Motorsports	78	Chevy	DAY; 24	CAL; 17	LVS; 19	PHO; 14	ATL; 14	COA; 16	RCH; 38	MAR; 24	TAL; 37	DOV; 36	DAR; 15	CLT; 32	PIR; 21	SON; 37	NSH; 23	CSC; 27	ATL; 34	NHA; 34	POC; 13	ROA; 16	MCH; 18	IRC; 23	GLN; 31	DAY; 8	DAR; 33	KAN; 27	BRI; 25	TEX; 14	ROV; 30	LVS; 34	HOM; 28	MAR; 8	PHO; 24	20th	454	
2024	Our Motorsports	5	Chevy	DAY; 24	ATL; 7	LVS; 16	PHO; 10	COA; 12	RCH; 29	MAR; 15	TEX; 10	TAL; 3	DOV; 9	DAR; 14	CLT; 16	PIR; 32	SON; 31	IOW; 15	NHA; 20	NSH; 18	CSC; 30	POC; 14	IND; 34	MCH; 4	DAY; 26	DAR; 26	ATL; 14	GLN; 34	BRI; 11	KAN; 15	TAL; 29	ROV; 16	LVS; 19	HOM; 15	MAR; 7	PHO; 36	15th	616	
2025	Young's Motorsports	42	Chevy	DAY; 22	ATL; 37	COA; 21	PHO; 32	LVS; 18	HOM; 18	MAR; 38	DAR; 31	BRI; 15	CAR; 15	TAL; 6	TEX; 12	CLT; 25	NSH; 29	MXC; 21	POC; 13	ATL; 29	CSC; 36	SON; 23	DOV; 23	IND; 23	IOW; 26	GLN; 32	DAY; 37	PIR; 33	GTW; 13	BRI; 22	KAN; 25	ROV; 23	LVS; 24	TAL; 33	MAR; 16	PHO; 23	24th	471	
2026	Viking Motorsports	96	Chevy	DAY; DNQ	ATL; 25	COA; 23	PHO; 10	LVS; 34	DAR; 12	MAR; 15	CAR; 24	BRI; 36	KAN; 30	TAL; 31	TEX; 12	GLN; 24	DOV; 10	CLT; 13	NSH; 17	POC; 6	COR; 35	SON; 4	CHI; 26	ATL; 5	IND; 14	IOW; 19	DAY; 4	DAR; 6	GTW; 22	BRI; 32	LVS; 10	CLT; 8	PHO; 17	TAL; 10	MAR; 17	HOM; 19	16th	735	
2026	Alpha Prime Racing	4	Chevy	DAY; 11																																	16th	735	

==== Gander Outdoors Truck Series ====
NASCAR Gander Outdoors Truck Series results
Year	Team	No.	Make	1	2	3	4	5	6	7	8	9	10	11	12	13	14	15	16	17	18	19	20	21	22	23	NGOTC	Pts	Ref
2019	DGR-Crosley	17	Toyota	DAY	ATL; 17									GTW; 12													22nd	240	
2019	DGR-Crosley	15	Toyota			LVS; 18	MAR				CLT; 8	TEX; 12	IOW		CHI; 9	KEN	POC; 31	ELD	MCH; 26	BRI	MSP	LVS; 12	TAL; 15	MAR	PHO; 24	HOM; 32	22nd	240	
2019	DGR-Crosley	54	Toyota					TEX; 28	DOV	KAN																	22nd	240	

^{*} Season still in progress
^{1} Ineligible for series points

=== ARCA Menards Series ===
(key) (Bold – Pole position awarded by qualifying time. Italics – Pole position earned by points standings or practice time. * – Most laps led.)

ARCA Menards Series results
Year	Team	No.	Make	1	2	3	4	5	6	7	8	9	10	11	12	13	14	15	16	17	18	19	20	AMSC	Pts	Ref
2018	MDM Motorsports	40	Toyota	DAY	NSH	SLM	TAL	TOL	CLT	POC	MCH	MAD	GTW; 7	CHI	IOW	ELK	POC	ISF	BLN	DSF	SLM	IRP	KAN; 15	50th	410	
2020	DGR-Crosley	17	Ford	DAY	PHO	TAL	POC	IRP	KEN	IOW	KAN	TOL	TOL	MCH; 5	DRC	GTW	L44	TOL	BRI	WIN	MEM	ISF	KAN	52nd	39	

==== K&N Pro Series East ====
NASCAR K&N Pro Series East results
Year	Team	No.	Make	1	2	3	4	5	6	7	8	9	10	11	12	13	14	NKNPSEC	Pts	Ref
2018	MDM Motorsports	40	Toyota	NSM; 24	BRI; 18	LGY; 2	SBO; 15	SBO; 1	MEM; 9	NJM; 5	THO; 6	NHA; 3	IOW; 22	GLN; 16	GTW; 9	NHA; 6	DOV; 6	5th	480	

=== CARS Late Model Stock Car Tour ===
(key) (Bold – Pole position awarded by qualifying time. Italics – Pole position earned by points standings or practice time. * – Most laps led. ** – All laps led.)

CARS Late Model Stock Car Tour results
Year	Team	No.	Make	1	2	3	4	5	6	7	8	9	10	11	12	13	CLMSCTC	Pts	Ref
2016	Lee Faulk Racing	5	Chevy	SNM	ROU	HCY	TCM	GPS	ROU	CNC	MYB	HCY; 9	SNM				43rd	24	
2017	JR Motorsports	8	Chevy	CNC; 24	DOM; 4	DOM; 4	HCY; 1	HCY; 1	BRI; 6	AND; 4	ROU; 5	TCM; 5	ROU; 5	HCY; 2	CNC; 17	SBO; 9	2nd	344	
