= 2026 NASCAR Cup Series =

American motorsport season

Kyle Larson won his third Cup Series championship and second consecutively.

Christopher Bell finished second in the championship standings.

Denny Hamlin, the No. 1 seed in The Chase, finished third in the championship standings.

Connor Zilisch, the 2026 NASCAR Rookie of the Year.

Toyota won the manufacturers' championship, its first since 2019.

The 2026 NASCAR Cup Series was the 78th season for NASCAR professional stock car racing in the United States and the 55th season for the modern-era Cup Series. The preseason featured the Cook Out Clash exhibition race on February 4 at Bowman Gray Stadium, followed by the season-opening 68th running of the Daytona 500 on February 15 at Daytona International Speedway. The season ended at Homestead–Miami Speedway on November 8.

Kyle Larson of Hendrick Motorsports returned as the reigning NASCAR Cup Series champion. For the first time since 2013, NASCAR utilized The Chase as their championship format after twelve seasons of using the elimination-style playoff format, with revised rules from its last installation. Following the Dollar Tree 301 at New Hampshire Motor Speedway, Denny Hamlin clinched the No. 1 seed in the Chase. Within the Chase, Larson won three races and clinched the championship following the conclusion of stage 1 of the season finale, becoming the first back-to-back champion since Jimmie Johnson won five consecutive from 2006 through 2010, and the first to clinch the championship before the end of the season finale since Matt Kenseth in 2003.

This season was marred by the death of two-time Cup Series champion Kyle Busch due to sepsis caused by pneumonia on May 21, days before the Coca-Cola 600. Busch was the first active full-time driver to die during a season since Dale Earnhardt's death in 2001, the first to do so off-track since Davey Allison in 1993, and overall driver since Jason Leffler, who was a part-time driver in 2013.

== Teams and drivers ==
=== Chartered teams ===
Manufacturer	Team	No.	Driver	Crew chief	References
Chevrolet	Haas Factory Team	41	Cole Custer	Aaron Kramer	
Chevrolet	Hendrick Motorsports	5	Kyle Larson	Cliff Daniels	
Chevrolet	Hendrick Motorsports	9	Chase Elliott	Alan Gustafson	
Chevrolet	Hendrick Motorsports	24	William Byron	Rudy Fugle	
Chevrolet	Hendrick Motorsports	48	Alex Bowman 32	Blake Harris	
Chevrolet	Hendrick Motorsports	48	Anthony Alfredo 1	Blake Harris	
Chevrolet	Hendrick Motorsports	48	Justin Allgaier 3	Blake Harris	
Chevrolet	Hyak Motorsports	47	Ricky Stenhouse Jr.	Mike Kelley	
Chevrolet	Kaulig Racing	10	Ty Dillon	Andrew Dickeson 34; Mike Cook 2	
Chevrolet	Kaulig Racing	16	A. J. Allmendinger	Trent Owens	
Chevrolet	Richard Childress Racing	3	Austin Dillon	Richard Boswell	
Chevrolet	Richard Childress Racing	8/33	Kyle Busch 12	Jim Pohlman 10; Andy Street 25; Johnny Klausmeier 1	
Chevrolet	Richard Childress Racing	8/33	Austin Hill 24	Jim Pohlman 10; Andy Street 25; Johnny Klausmeier 1	
Chevrolet	Rick Ware Racing	51	Cody Ware	Billy Plourde	
Chevrolet	Spire Motorsports	7	Daniel Suárez	Ryan Sparks	
Chevrolet	Spire Motorsports	71	Michael McDowell	Travis Peterson	
Chevrolet	Spire Motorsports	77	Carson Hocevar 35	Luke Lambert	
Chevrolet	Spire Motorsports	77	Justin Haley 1	Luke Lambert	
Chevrolet	Trackhouse Racing	1	Ross Chastain	Brandon McSwain	
Chevrolet	Trackhouse Racing	88	Connor Zilisch (R)	Randall Burnett	
Chevrolet	Trackhouse Racing	97	Shane van Gisbergen	Stephen Doran	
Ford	Front Row Motorsports	4	Noah Gragson	Grant Hutchens	
Ford	Front Row Motorsports	34	Todd Gilliland	Chris Lawson	
Ford	Front Row Motorsports	38	Zane Smith	Ryan Bergenty	
Ford	RFK Racing	6	Brad Keselowski	Jeremy Bullins 29; Mike Skarbowski 7	
Ford	RFK Racing	17	Chris Buescher	Scott Graves	
Ford	RFK Racing	60	Ryan Preece	Derrick Finley	
Ford	Team Penske	2	Austin Cindric	Brian Wilson	
Ford	Team Penske	12	Ryan Blaney	Jonathan Hassler 35; Matt Swiderski 1	
Ford	Team Penske	22	Joey Logano	Paul Wolfe	
Ford	Wood Brothers Racing	21	Josh Berry	Miles Stanley 35; Matt Swiderski 1	
Toyota	23XI Racing	23	Bubba Wallace	Charles Denike	
Toyota	23XI Racing	35	Riley Herbst 35	Davin Restivo	
Toyota	23XI Racing	35	Harrison Burton 1	Davin Restivo	
Toyota	23XI Racing	45	Tyler Reddick	Billy Scott	
Toyota	Joe Gibbs Racing	11	Denny Hamlin	Chris Gayle	
Toyota	Joe Gibbs Racing	19	Chase Briscoe	James Small	
Toyota	Joe Gibbs Racing	20	Christopher Bell	Adam Stevens	
Toyota	Joe Gibbs Racing	54	Ty Gibbs	Tyler Allen	
Toyota	Legacy Motor Club	42	John Hunter Nemechek	Travis Mack 28; Chais Eliason 8	
Toyota	Legacy Motor Club	43	Erik Jones	Justin Alexander	

=== Non-chartered teams ===
Manufacturer	Team	No.	Driver	Crew chief	Races	References
Chevrolet	Beard Motorsports	62	Anthony Alfredo	Darren Shaw	1	
Chevrolet	Beard Motorsports	62	Casey Mears	Darren Shaw	6	
Chevrolet	JR Motorsports	40	Justin Allgaier	Greg Ives	1	
Chevrolet	Live Fast Motorsports	78	B. J. McLeod	David Ingram	3	
Chevrolet	Live Fast Motorsports	78	Daniel Dye	David Ingram	5	
Chevrolet	Live Fast Motorsports	78	Katherine Legge	David Ingram	2	
Chevrolet	NY Racing Team	44	J. J. Yeley	Jay Guy	5	
Chevrolet	NY Racing Team	44	Joey Gase	Jay Guy	3	
Chevrolet	NY Racing Team	44	B. J. McLeod	Jay Guy	1	
Chevrolet	Richard Childress Racing	33	Jesse Love	Andy Street	2	
Chevrolet	Richard Childress Racing	33	Austin Hill	Andy Street	2	
Chevrolet	Trackhouse Racing	91	Kevin Magnussen	Phil Surgen	1	
Ford	Front Row Motorsports	36	Chandler Smith	Seth Barbour	1	
Ford	Garage 66	66	Casey Mears	Jason Miller 4 Carl Long 14	1	
Ford	Garage 66	66	Timmy Hill	Jason Miller 4 Carl Long 14	2	
Ford	Garage 66	66	Chad Finchum	Jason Miller 4 Carl Long 14	8	
Ford	Garage 66	66	Josh Bilicki	Jason Miller 4 Carl Long 14	5	
Ford	Garage 66	66	Gray Gaulding	Jason Miller 4 Carl Long 14	3	
Ford	RFK Racing	99	Corey LaJoie	Mike Skarbowski	1	
Toyota	23XI Racing	67	Corey Heim	Bootie Barker	13	
Toyota	Legacy Motor Club	84	Jimmie Johnson	Chad Johnston	2	

=== Team changes ===
Chevrolet unveiled a new body style for the ZL1 in November 2025 for the 2026 season to replace the model that had been used since 2022. The redesign is based on the Camaro ZL1 Carbon Performance Package accessories kit. Haas Factory Team and Rick Ware Racing switched from Ford to Chevrolet in 2026. HFT has a technical alliance with Hendrick Motorsports, while RWR formed a technical partnership with Richard Childress Racing.

=== Driver changes ===
Justin Haley did not return to Spire Motorsports. Haley returned to Kaulig Racing, driving in the Craftsman Truck Series. Daniel Suárez, who was released from Trackhouse Racing, moved to Spire Motorports in Haley's place.

Kyle Busch died three days before the 2026 Coca-Cola 600 from hemorrhagic shock caused by sepsis from untreated pneumonia; he was going to skip the race weekend to deal with the illness and Austin Hill was to drive in his place. In his honor, Richard Childress Racing decided to stop using his number, 8, and hold it until his son Brexton could begin racing in NASCAR; the car was renumbered to 33. On June 6, Hill was named as Busch's permanent replacement for at least the remainder of the season.

==== Rookie ====
Connor Zilisch was the only full-time rookie for 2026. He signed with Trackhouse Racing to replace Daniel Suárez.

== Rule changes ==
=== Technical changes ===
==== Horsepower ====
Horsepower increased from 670 to 750 at tracks under 1.5 miles and road courses.

==== Track packages ====
Bristol, Darlington, Dover, Nashville, New Hampshire, and St. Louis would run the short track package rather than the intermediate package from previous years. NASCAR also mandated a permanent A-post flap for all races to prevent flips. The A-post flap debuted the previous year at Daytona II.

==== Superspeedway packages ====
NASCAR changed the superspeedway package starting at Daytona II to a "4-inch spoiler and wide splitter stuffers. The spoiler deflection device was redesigned to accommodate the 4-inch spoiler. New spoiler braces and an engine tapered spacer were reduced to 27/32-inch." Starting at Talladega II, the spoiler was shrunk again to "3.5 inches".

=== Policy changes ===
==== Loosening lower series restriction ====
The amount of races full-time Cup drivers can run in the O'Reilly Auto Parts Series and Craftsman Truck Series was increased to ten and eight respectively, up from the 2025 restriction of five in each series. Cup drivers remain ineligible for points, as well as unable to compete in the postseason events.

==== Age limit ====
The minimum age requirement to race in the O'Reilly Auto Parts series was lowered to 17 for road courses and oval tracks less than 1.25 miles in length. This change creates a staggered minimum age: 16 in Trucks, 17 in O'Reilly, and 18 in Cup Series events.

==== Qualifying hand restriction ====
The restriction of hands out the window during qualifying at drafting tracks such as Daytona, Talladega, and Atlanta (EchoPark) was added, and drivers who touch the window net or the hole in between to redirect air will have their qualifying time disallowed. Noah Gragson was the first to break this rule, having his Daytona 500 qualifying time erased.

==== Increased practice time ====
Practice time was increased at most tracks besides Daytona, Talladega and Atlanta. The change saw two groups of 25 minutes each to one 50-minute session involving all cars. Beginning at New Hampshire Motor Speedway, Cup Series practice will be consolidated into a single 50-minute session.

==== Shorter caution periods ====
Beginning at Iowa, NASCAR announced that when a caution comes out with 10 laps or less in the stage, the stage will be deemed official.

=== Charter agreement changes ===
Following the outcome of the 23XI Racing lawsuit, all teams were offered "evergreen" charters. In contrast to previous agreements, which expired at a set date, the new agreement would include charters that would not expire.

=== Points system changes ===
==== Postseason format ====
NASCAR revealed a new postseason format in January 2026. Used in the top three series, it is a return of the Chase format previously used from 2004 to 2013. The top 16 drivers on points after 26 races will qualify for the Chase, with the 'win-and-you're-in' rule being scrapped, and starting points in the Chase will be staggered based on the regular season standings. This format replaced a derided playoff system, which included four "rounds" with points resets. With the change, playoff points are no longer awarded.

==== First-place point increase ====
The points awarded for finishing first in a race was increased from 40 to 55.

==== Fastest lap restriction ====
Drivers who enter the garage during a race will no longer be eligible for the fastest lap bonus point. If the driver's fastest lap was achieved before they entered the garage, it will still stand.

==== Removal of regular season championship ====
With the changes of the chase, the regular season championship was removed.

== Schedule ==
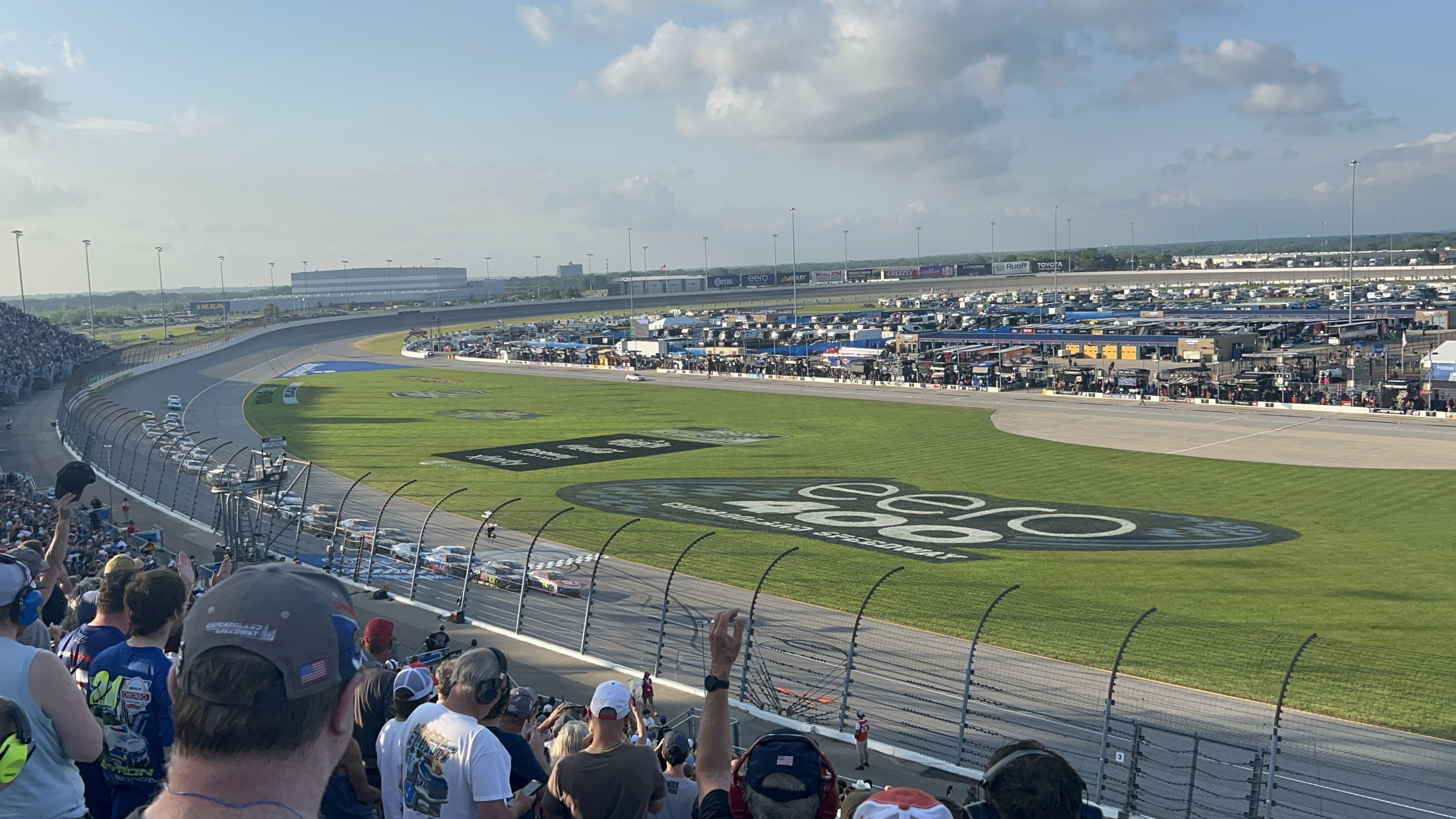
The 2026 eero 400 at Chicagoland Speedway in July.

The 2026 schedule consisted of 32 oval races, 3 road course races, 1 street track race, and 3 non-championship races held on ovals.

Bolded races indicate an event generally known as a Crown Jewel race.

O Oval track
R Road course
S Street course

No	Race name	Track	Location	Date	Time (ET)	TV	Radio
Regular Season
	Cook Out Clash	O Bowman Gray Stadium	Winston-Salem, North Carolina	February 4 (Note: The Clash was originally scheduled to take place on February 1 but was postponed to February 2, before being again postponed to February 4 due to snow in Winston-Salem.)	6 pm	FOX	MRN
	America 250 Florida Duel at Daytona	O Daytona International Speedway	Daytona Beach, Florida	February 12	7 pm	FS1	MRN
1	**Daytona 500**	O Daytona International Speedway	Daytona Beach, Florida	February 15	1:30 pm (Note: Originally scheduled to start at 2:30 pm, the threat of rain pushed the start of the Daytona 500 to 1:30pm.)	FOX	MRN
2	Autotrader 400	O EchoPark Speedway	Hampton, Georgia	February 22	3 pm	FOX	PRN
3	DuraMAX Texas Grand Prix	R Circuit of the Americas	Austin, Texas	March 1	3:30 pm	FOX	PRN
4	Straight Talk Wireless 500	O Phoenix Raceway	Avondale, Arizona	March 8	3:30 pm	FS1	MRN
5	Pennzoil 400	O Las Vegas Motor Speedway	Las Vegas, Nevada	March 15	4 pm	FS1	PRN
6	Goodyear 400	O Darlington Raceway	Darlington, South Carolina	March 22	3 pm	FS1	MRN
7	Cook Out 400	O Martinsville Speedway	Ridgeway, Virginia	March 29	3:30 pm	FS1	MRN
8	Food City 500	O Bristol Motor Speedway	Bristol, Tennessee	April 12	3 pm	FS1	PRN
9	AdventHealth 400	O Kansas Speedway	Kansas City, Kansas	April 19	2 pm	FOX	MRN
10	Jack Link's 500	O Talladega Superspeedway	Lincoln, Alabama	April 26	3 pm	FOX	MRN
11	Würth 400	O Texas Motor Speedway	Fort Worth, Texas	May 3	3:30 pm	FS1	PRN
12	Go Bowling at The Glen	R Watkins Glen International	Watkins Glen, New York	May 10	3 pm	FS1	MRN
	NASCAR All-Star Race	O Dover Motor Speedway	Dover, Delaware	May 17	1 pm (Note: Originally scheduled to start at 3 pm, the announcement of the race format moved the race up to 1 pm.)	FS1	PRN
13	**Coca-Cola 600**	O Charlotte Motor Speedway	Concord, North Carolina	May 24	6 pm	Prime	PRN
14	Cracker Barrel 400	O Nashville Superspeedway	Lebanon, Tennessee	May 31	7 pm	Prime	PRN
15	FireKeepers Casino 400	O Michigan International Speedway	Brooklyn, Michigan	June 7	3 pm	Prime	MRN
16	The Great American Getaway 400	O Pocono Raceway	Blakeslee, Pennsylvania	June 14	1 pm (Note: Originally scheduled to start at 3 pm, the threat of evening rain moved it up to 1 pm.)	Prime	MRN
17	Anduril 250	S Coronado Street Course	San Diego, California	June 21	4 pm	Prime	MRN
NASCAR In-Season Challenge
18	Toyota/Save Mart 350	R Sonoma Raceway	Sonoma, California	June 28	3:30 pm	TNT	MRN
19	eero 400	O Chicagoland Speedway	Joliet, Illinois	July 5	6 pm	TNT	MRN
20	Quaker State 400	O EchoPark Speedway	Hampton, Georgia	July 12	7 pm	TNT	PRN
21	Window World 450	O North Wilkesboro Speedway	North Wilkesboro, North Carolina	July 19	7 pm	TNT	PRN
22	**Brickyard 400**	O Indianapolis Motor Speedway	Speedway, Indiana	July 26	2 pm	TNT	IMS
Regular Season
23	Iowa Corn 350	O Iowa Speedway	Newton, Iowa	August 9	3:30 pm	USA	MRN
24	Cook Out 400	O Richmond Raceway	Richmond, Virginia	August 15	7 pm	USA	MRN
25	Dollar Tree 301	O New Hampshire Motor Speedway	Loudon, New Hampshire	August 23	2 pm (Note: Originally scheduled to start at 3 pm, the threat of evening rain moved it up to 2 pm.)	USA	PRN
26	Coke Zero Sugar 400	O Daytona International Speedway	Daytona Beach, Florida	August 29	7:30 pm	NBC	MRN
The Chase
27	**Cook Out Southern 500**	O Darlington Raceway	Darlington, South Carolina	September 6	5 pm	USA	MRN
28	Enjoy Illinois 300	O World Wide Technology Raceway	Madison, Illinois	September 13	3 pm	USA	MRN
29	Bass Pro Shops Night Race	O Bristol Motor Speedway	Bristol, Tennessee	September 19	7:30 pm	USA	PRN
30	Hollywood Casino 400	O Kansas Speedway	Kansas City, Kansas	September 27	3 pm	USA	MRN
31	South Point 400	O Las Vegas Motor Speedway	Las Vegas, Nevada	October 4	5:30 pm	USA	PRN
32	Bank of America 400	O Charlotte Motor Speedway (Note: The fall Charlotte race was originally announced as on the Roval configuration, but news broke in February that it would move to the oval track.)	Concord, North Carolina	October 11	3 pm	USA	PRN
33	Freeway Insurance 500	O Phoenix Raceway	Avondale, Arizona	October 18	3 pm	USA	MRN
34	YellaWood 500	O Talladega Superspeedway	Lincoln, Alabama	October 25	2 pm	NBC	MRN
35	Xfinity 500	O Martinsville Speedway	Ridgeway, Virginia	November 1	2 pm	NBC	MRN
36	Season Finale 400	O Homestead–Miami Speedway	Homestead, Florida	November 8	3 pm	NBC	MRN

=== Schedule changes ===
Homestead–Miami Speedway returned to its traditional date as the season finale for all three major series. To accommodate this change, New Hampshire Motor Speedway was removed from The Chase. Chicago Street Course officials announced that the Grant Park 165 will not return in 2026, with hopes to revive the event in future seasons. The Cup Series returned to Southern California with a street race at Naval Base Coronado near San Diego. To accommodate this change, Mexico City was dropped from the schedule due to a conflict with the 2026 FIFA World Cup. The NASCAR All-Star Race moved from North Wilkesboro Speedway to Dover Motor Speedway, giving the former a points race, the first regular-season race held since 1996. Chicagoland Speedway returned to the schedule for the first time since 2019. The Charlotte Motor Speedway fall race moved away from the roval layout to the oval after eight years as a road course race.

== Season summary ==
=== Preseason races ===
Due to a historic snowstorm over the United States, the Cook Out Clash was postponed three times from its original Saturday and Sunday dates, before ultimately being condensed to a one-day event on Wednesday, February 4. Reigning champion Kyle Larson won pole position. Weather plagued the event, causing NASCAR to mandate use of wet weather tires after a scheduled half-race break. After an event record 17 cautions, Ryan Preece won the Clash, joining Jeff Gordon and Denny Hamlin as drivers who won the Clash before winning their first points paying race.

The Duel at Daytona races set the starting order for the Daytona 500, with the exception of the front row, which is set by the fastest two times in qualifying. Kyle Busch and Chase Briscoe won the pole and second place respectively, and therefore started first in each duel race. During the first Duel, RFK Racing (whose cars used the number font of late RFK driver Greg Biffle, as did Kaulig Racing's no. 16) dominated the majority of the race, seeking to help Corey LaJoie clinch among the "Open" cars, as he had not qualified for the race. Unfortunately for LaJoie, a last lap wreck ended his chances of making the 500. Casey Mears, despite a spin earlier in the race, dodged LaJoie during the wreck, clinching his spot into the race, making his first Daytona 500 start since 2019.

During the second Duel, which ran caution-free, Chase Elliott finished 0.065 seconds ahead of Carson Hocevar. Anthony Alfredo finished in position to make the Daytona 500 as the last open car, but was disqualified after a post-race technical inspection found that his car's cooling hoses were not secured. Due to the disqualification, the next-best finishing open car, driven by B. J. McLeod, qualified for the race.

=== Regular season ===
NASCAR moved the Daytona 500 start time forward an hour to 1:30 p.m. eastern time due to the threat of rain in the evening. Zane Smith won stage one after staying out in the middle of pit cycles, as well as getting his first career stage win. Stage two featured a battle between polesitter Kyle Busch and Kyle Larson for the lead for the majority of the stage. Bubba Wallace, however, won the second stage, after narrowly avoiding "The Big One", caused by Denny Hamlin tapping Justin Allgaier's rear bumper, triggering a 20-car pileup on the tri-oval. After a restart with five laps remaining, Tyler Reddick escaped two wrecks and passed Chase Elliott for the win exiting turn four.

Tyler Reddick won the pole at Atlanta after qualifying was canceled due to rain. Austin Cindric won stage one, and William Byron originally appeared to have won stage two, however Bubba Wallace was later ruled as the stage winner, finishing inches in front of Byron due to a spin by Kyle Larson narrowly behind them. During overtime, Reddick, who was involved in a crash on 160, won the race. Reddick became the sixth driver ever, and the first since Matt Kenseth in 2009, to win the first two races of the season.

Tyler Reddick won his second pole of the season at Austin, his third pole win at the track, with the other pole wins being 2021 and 2025. Pit strategies shook up the stage standings, with Ross Chastain winning stage one and Ty Gibbs winning stage two. On lap 76, Myatt Snider replaced Alex Bowman, as Bowman experienced vertigo symptoms during the race. Reddick dominated the later half of the race, becoming the first driver in series history to win the first three races to begin a season.

Joey Logano won the pole at Phoenix. Similar to the previous season's fall race at the track, tires had increased tire wear, playing a key role in the race. Ryan Blaney won stage one and Christopher Bell won stage two. A late race caution on lap 295 reset the field; Bell had led 176 laps to that point. Blaney passed the leader, Ty Gibbs, on lap 303, holding off a hard charging Bell and ultimately winning the race, getting his second consecutive win at the track.

Christopher Bell won the pole at Las Vegas. Bell won stage one and William Byron won stage two. Denny Hamlin, who finished second to Bell in qualifying, dominated the race. Hamlin would overcome a pit road speeding penalty earlier in the race and led a race high 134 laps en route to his 61st Cup Series win, putting him 10th all time on NASCAR's all-time winners, as well as claiming his second consecutive win at the track.

Tyler Reddick won the pole at Darlington. Brad Keselowski swept the stages, seeking to get his first win since 2024's running of the race. Reddick battled for the lead with Keselowski, eventually overtaking him on lap 265, winning the race and continuing his early season success. Reddick became the third driver ever, along with Dale Earnhardt and Bill Elliott, to win 4 of the first 6 races of a season.

Denny Hamlin won the pole at Martinsville. A caution came out on lap 77, ending stage one early with Hamlin winning. Hamlin eventually swept the stages. Chase Elliott would take advantage of a late race caution and would hold off Hamlin for his 22nd career win and first win at Martinsville Speedway since 2020.

Ryan Blaney won the pole at Bristol. Kyle Larson swept the stages for the second straight day, as he also swept Saturday's O'Reilly race stages. A late race caution on lap 498 would shake up the race and cause overtime, Ty Gibbs held off a hard charging Blaney and Larson to get his first career Cup Series win, becoming the first Cup driver to get their first win at Bristol Motor Speedway since Kurt Busch in 2002.

Tyler Reddick won the pole at Kansas. Denny Hamlin won stage one and Kyle Larson won stage two. Reddick ran out of fuel on lap 266 before a spin by Cody Ware triggered a caution, forcing overtime. Reddick, following pit stops, was able to pass three cars in the final two laps of overtime for his fifth win of the season, becoming the first driver since Dale Earnhardt in 1987 to win five of the first nine races in a season.

Rain at Talladega canceled qualifying, with Tyler Reddick winning the pole. The stages were changed to prevent fuel saving. Ryan Preece won stage one. On lap 115, "The Big One" struck, taking out 26 drivers, such as Kyle Larson, Bubba Wallace, Joey Logano, Daniel Suárez, Ty Gibbs, Ryan Blaney, and others. Ross Chastain won stage two. The race ended with Carson Hocevar scoring his first career win by 0.114 seconds over Chris Buescher and Alex Bowman.

Carson Hocevar won the pole at Texas. Erik Jones won stage one, his first career stage win. Chase Elliott won stage two. Elliott would dominate the later half of the race, and ultimately would hold off runner-up Denny Hamlin after a late race caution for his second career win at Texas Motor Speedway.

Shane van Gisbergen won the pole at Watkins Glen. Ross Chastain won stage one and van Gisbergen won stage two. Following pit cycles, stage three featured a battle between Ty Gibbs and Connor Zilisch. However, van Gisbergen, after ending up 24th after pit cycles on lap 76, was able to overtake Gibbs with 8 to go and would win the race, claiming his second consecutive win at Watkins Glen International.

Denny Hamlin won the pole for the exhibition race at Dover. On lap two, a wreck occurred with Ryan Preece's car catching on fire, bringing out the red flag early. Another caution on lap 63 ended segment one early, with Bubba Wallace winning segment one. Segment two featured an inversion of the field, with Tyler Reddick winning segment two. The field was shrunk to 26 cars for the final segment. Hamlin eventually dominated the final segment, holding off Chase Briscoe for his second NASCAR All-Star Race win, and first since 2015.

The next weekend's race at Charlotte was marred by the death of Kyle Busch that Thursday, as he had developed sepsis stemming from pneumonia earlier in the week. Rain at the track canceled qualifying, with Tyler Reddick winning the pole. Kyle Larson won stage one, Denny Hamlin won stage two, and Christopher Bell won stage three, with Joe Gibbs Racing claiming a 1-2-3-4 sweep. After a thrilling final stage, run with rain in the area, Daniel Suárez was announced as the winner after the race was called 27 laps early due to rainfall at the track. Suárez claimed his first win since the 2024 Ambetter Health 400 and third overall in his career. Suárez would dedicate the win to Busch.

Rain at Nashville canceled qualifying, with Denny Hamlin winning the pole. Hamlin immediately received a black flag for a jump start penalty, the first of his career. After a caution on lap 82 set up a one-lap shootout, A. J. Allmendinger won stage one, his first stage win on an oval. Another caution on lap 183 ended stage two under caution, with Daniel Suárez winning stage two. After a late race caution, Hamlin passed teammates Christopher Bell and Chase Briscoe to win the race after a three-wide move, claiming Toyota's first win at Nashville Superspeedway, as well as overcoming his penalty from earlier in the race.

Denny Hamlin won the pole at Michigan. Hamlin later went to the rear following unapproved adjustments for the start of the race. Tyler Reddick won stage one, and Chase Elliott won stage two. On lap 149, Christopher Bell and Elliott wrecked, bringing out the red flag, as well as causing damage to the outside safer barrier. After another caution on lap 154, Hamlin dominated the later half of the race. Hamlin claimed his 63rd career win, and would tie long time teammate Kyle Busch for 9th on the all time NASCAR win list, waving a special flag in memoriam.

NASCAR moved Pocono's start time up two hours to 1 p.m. eastern time due to the threat of evening rain. Denny Hamlin won the pole. Hamlin won stage one, and Todd Gilliland won stage two, his first career stage win. Hamlin overtook teammate Christopher Bell with 5 laps to go to eventually win the race, claiming his eighth career win at Pocono Raceway, his first career three-peat, as well as being three days removed from the 2006 Pocono 500, Hamlin's first career win.

Shane van Gisbergen won the pole at Coronado. Ryan Blaney won stage one while Ryan Preece won stage two. After teammate Tyler Reddick spun with 4 laps to go, Corey Heim scored his first career win in just his 13th start after battling with Reddick.

Ty Gibbs won the pole at Sonoma. Gibbs swept both stages, Shane van Gisbergen won the race after holding off Chase Briscoe. For the first time all season, the points leader changed as Denny Hamlin passed Tyler Reddick to take over the points lead.

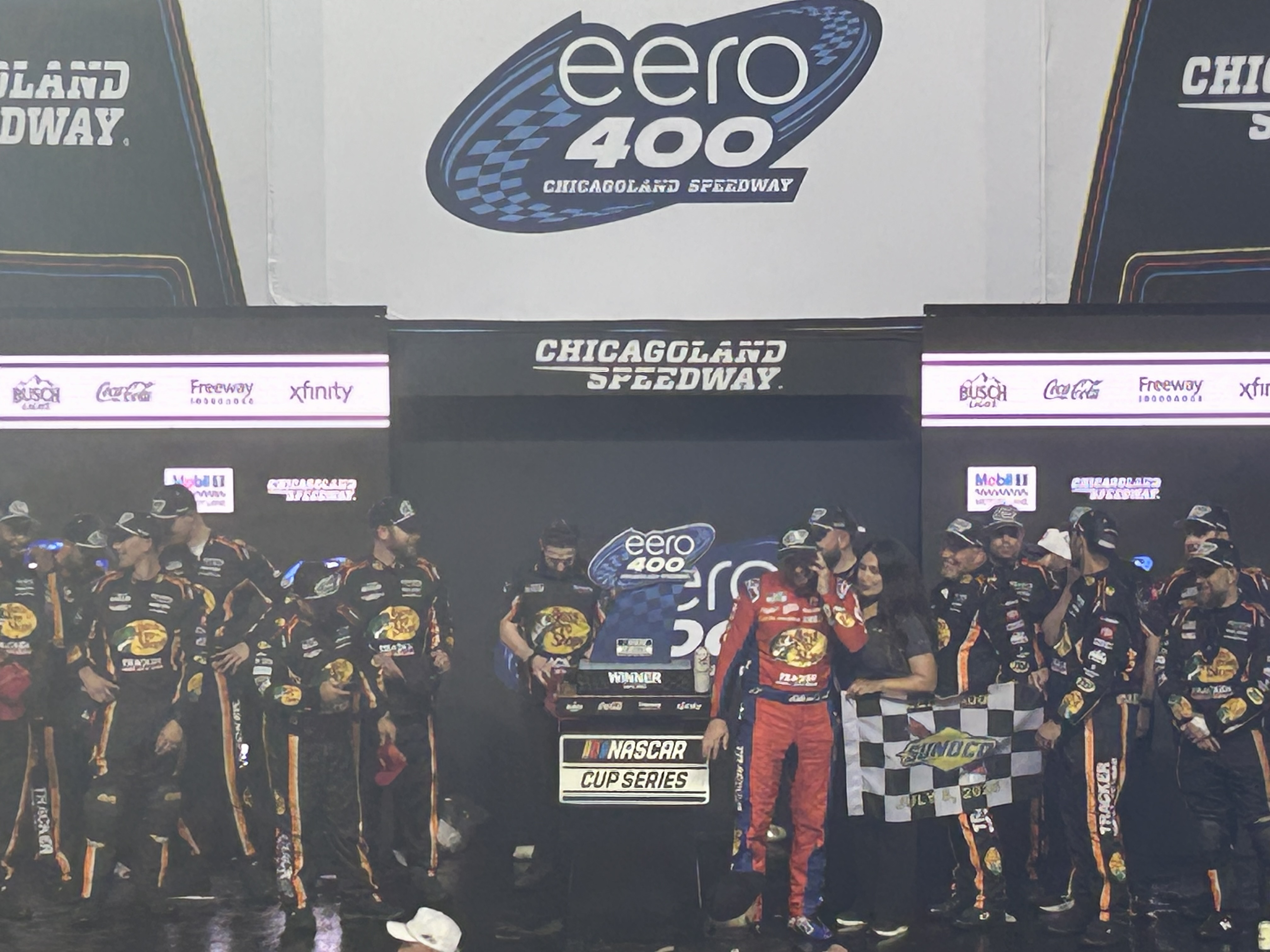
Chase Briscoe celebrating his eero 400 win at Chicagoland Speedway.

Denny Hamlin won the pole at the series return to Chicagoland for the first time since 2019. William Byron won stages one and two. After overtaking Byron during the final pit cycles, Chase Briscoe won the race, also holding off teammates Christopher Bell and Hamlin.

Ryan Blaney won the pole at Atlanta. The race was red-flagged on lap 108 due to lightning and resumed after three hours. Blaney swept both stages, and on lap 255, a caution happened, causing overtime. Blaney won the race. Blaney also broke a record for the second-most laps led on a drafting track at 171, the most since Richard Petty during the 1964 Daytona 500. Both Denny Hamlin and Tyler Reddick were locked into The Chase.

North Wilkesboro Speedway returned to the schedule as a points paying race for the first time since 1996. Rain at the track canceled qualifying, with Ryan Blaney winning the pole. Ty Gibbs won stage one, passing Shane van Gisbergen on the last lap. Joey Logano won stage two. Logano dominated stage three, holding off Denny Hamlin for his first win since the 2025 Würth 400. Blaney was locked into The Chase.

Carson Hocevar won the pole at Indianapolis. Ty Gibbs won the first stage, and Ross Chastain won the second stage. Corey Heim held off Christopher Bell and Joey Logano to win the race. Heim made history with this win, becoming the first part-time car to win a crown jewel race since Trevor Bayne won the 2011 Daytona 500. Heim also became the youngest driver to win the Brickyard 400 since Jeff Gordon in the 1994 Brickyard 400, as well as tying A. J. Foyt with his second win in fifthteen starts.

Ryan Blaney won the pole at Iowa. Blaney won stage one, while Christopher Bell won stage two. Ty Gibbs won the race and his second career win.

Ryan Blaney won the pole at Richmond. Blaney won stage one. Blaney's Team Penske teammate Joey Logano won stage two. Following the last cycle of pit stops, Logano was able to hold off Chase Briscoe for his second win of the season, his first win at Richmond Raceway since the 2017 Toyota Owners 400.

NASCAR moved New Hampshire's start time up an hour to 2 p.m. due to the threat of evening rain. Tyler Reddick won the pole. The race began on wet-weather tires until a competition caution came out on lap 40 to replace them. Kyle Larson won stage one, and defending race winner Ryan Blaney won stage two. Blaney dominated the final stage following an incident on pit road and held off Bubba Wallace for his second consecutive win at New Hampshire Motor Speedway. Following this race, Hamlin clinched the No. 1 seed for the Chase.

Ross Chastain won the pole at Daytona. Shane van Gisbergen won stage one, his first stage win on an oval after leader Chris Buescher wrecked coming to the tri-oval. The defending race winner Ryan Blaney won stage 2. After the yellow came out on the last lap, Ryan Preece was announced as the winner over runner-up Zane Smith. With the win, Preece secured his first career win and joined Bubba Wallace and Austin Cindric as the final three drivers to race into the Chase.

=== The Chase ===
Tyler Reddick won the pole at Darlington after the rest of qualifying was canceled due to lightning. Reddick won stage one while Christopher Bell won stage two. After battling with Kyle Larson and holding off his teammate Ty Gibbs, Bell won the race, snapping his 33-race winless streak.

Joey Logano won the pole at St. Louis. Logano won stage one while Kyle Larson won a shortened stage two. After a double overtime finish (and a track record 18 cautions), Larson won the race, snapping his 51-race winless streak.

Rain at Bristol canceled qualifying, with Kyle Larson winning the pole. Joey Logano won stage one, while Ryan Blaney won stage two. Logano won the race, and Larson took the points lead from Denny Hamlin by one point. After the race, Blaney and Carson Hocevar got into an altercation due to an on track incident that happened on lap 457. No penalties were announced for either driver.

Rain at Kansas canceled qualifying, with Joey Logano winning the pole. Kyle Larson won stage one and two. In stage 3, Larson was battling with Chase Briscoe for the lead, with Larson making a pass late and winning the race.

Denny Hamlin won the pole at Las Vegas in a JGR 1-2-3-4 start. Chase Briscoe won both stages, led 175 laps, and managed to defend against Kyle Larson late in the race to ultimately secure the win.

Rain at Charlotte canceled qualifying, with Kyle Larson winning the pole. Larson won stage one while Christopher Bell won stage two. Towards the end of the race Bell was battling his JGR teammate Chase Briscoe and Briscoe won the race in a photo finish, his second straight win.

Ryan Blaney won the pole at Phoenix. Joey Logano swept both stages and Tyler Reddick won the race, his Cup-leading sixth on the year and first since the spring Kansas race.

Chase Briscoe won the pole at Talladega. Chris Buescher won stage one while Joey Logano won stage two. In stage three, with five laps to go, the second "Big One" of the race occurred. 15 cars were involved, including Logano, whose car ended up flipped on its roof. The massive accident prompted a red flag. Once the red flag was lifted, the race went into an overtime finish. Kyle Larson scored his first ever win on a superspeedway.

Denny Hamlin won the pole at Martinsville. William Byron would dominate, sweeping the stages as well as going on to win the race. He led 362 of 500 laps and earned maximum points. Kyle Larson would leave Martinsville with a 67-point advantage over Christopher Bell and a 70-point advantage over Hamlin going into the final race at Homestead. Both Carson Hocevar and Josh Berry were penalized with 25 driver points, Berry only got fined with US$50,000 while Hocevar got fined US$100,000 and was suspended by Spire Motorsports for one race for actions detrimental to stock car racing. Justin Haley was tabbed to replace Hocevar in the No. 77.

Chase Briscoe won pole at Homestead, with Denny Hamlin starting second, Kyle Larson starting fourth, and Christopher Bell starting sixth. Tyler Reddick won stage one, with Larson able to score enough points in the first stage to mathematically clinch his third career Cup Series championship after finishing fourth in the stage. Hamlin won the second stage. Ryan Blaney, who restarted 4th at the time, passed 3 cars in 8 laps to win the race.

== Results and standings ==
=== Race results ===
No.	Race	Pole position	Most laps led	Fastest race lap	Winning driver	Manufacturer	Report
	Cook Out Clash	Kyle Larson	Kyle Larson	—N/a	Ryan Preece	Ford	Report
	America 250 Florida Duels	Kyle Busch	Ryan Preece	—N/a	Joey Logano	Ford	Report
	America 250 Florida Duels	Chase Briscoe	Chase Briscoe	—N/a	Chase Elliott	Chevrolet	Report
1	Daytona 500	Kyle Busch	Bubba Wallace	Carson Hocevar	Tyler Reddick	Toyota	Report
2	Autotrader 400	Tyler Reddick	Tyler Reddick	Cole Custer	Tyler Reddick	Toyota	Report
3	DuraMAX Texas Grand Prix	Tyler Reddick	Tyler Reddick	Ross Chastain	Tyler Reddick	Toyota	Report
4	Straight Talk Wireless 500	Joey Logano	Christopher Bell	Joey Logano	Ryan Blaney	Ford	Report
5	Pennzoil 400	Christopher Bell	Denny Hamlin	Denny Hamlin	Denny Hamlin	Toyota	Report
6	Goodyear 400	Tyler Reddick	Brad Keselowski	Bubba Wallace	Tyler Reddick	Toyota	Report
7	Cook Out 400	Denny Hamlin	Denny Hamlin	Denny Hamlin	Chase Elliott	Chevrolet	Report
8	Food City 500	Ryan Blaney	Kyle Larson	Ryan Blaney	Ty Gibbs	Toyota	Report
9	AdventHealth 400	Tyler Reddick	Denny Hamlin	Christopher Bell	Tyler Reddick	Toyota	Report
10	Jack Link's 500	Tyler Reddick	Christopher Bell	Zane Smith	Carson Hocevar	Chevrolet	Report
11	Würth 400	Carson Hocevar	Chase Elliott	Chase Elliott	Chase Elliott	Chevrolet	Report
12	Go Bowling at The Glen	Shane van Gisbergen	Shane van Gisbergen	Connor Zilisch	Shane van Gisbergen	Chevrolet	Report
	NASCAR All-Star Race	Denny Hamlin	Denny Hamlin	—N/a	Denny Hamlin	Toyota	Report
13	Coca-Cola 600	Tyler Reddick	Tyler Reddick	Ty Gibbs	Daniel Suárez	Chevrolet	Report
14	Cracker Barrel 400	Denny Hamlin	Denny Hamlin	Denny Hamlin	Denny Hamlin	Toyota	Report
15	FireKeepers Casino 400	Denny Hamlin	Chase Elliott	Carson Hocevar	Denny Hamlin	Toyota	Report
16	The Great American Getaway 400	Denny Hamlin	John Hunter Nemechek	Chris Buescher	Denny Hamlin	Toyota	Report
17	Anduril 250	Shane van Gisbergen	Ryan Blaney	Kevin Magnussen	Corey Heim	Toyota	Report
18	Toyota/Save Mart 350	Ty Gibbs	Shane van Gisbergen	Tyler Reddick	Shane van Gisbergen	Chevrolet	Report
19	eero 400	Denny Hamlin	William Byron	Bubba Wallace	Chase Briscoe	Toyota	Report
20	Quaker State 400	Ryan Blaney	Ryan Blaney	Cody Ware	Ryan Blaney	Ford	Report
21	Window World 450	Ryan Blaney	Joey Logano	Ross Chastain	Joey Logano	Ford	Report
22	Brickyard 400	Carson Hocevar	Corey Heim	Corey Heim	Corey Heim	Toyota	Report
23	Iowa Corn 350	Ryan Blaney	Ryan Blaney	Christopher Bell	Ty Gibbs	Toyota	Report
24	Cook Out 400	Ryan Blaney	Chase Briscoe	Ryan Blaney	Joey Logano	Ford	Report
25	Dollar Tree 301	Tyler Reddick	Ryan Blaney	Carson Hocevar	Ryan Blaney	Ford	Report
26	Coke Zero Sugar 400	Ross Chastain	Austin Hill	Noah Gragson	Ryan Preece	Ford	Report
The Chase
27	Cook Out Southern 500	Tyler Reddick	Kyle Larson	Christopher Bell	Christopher Bell	Toyota	Report
28	Enjoy Illinois 300	Joey Logano	Joey Logano	Joey Logano	Kyle Larson	Chevrolet	Report
29	Bass Pro Shops Night Race	Kyle Larson	Ryan Blaney	Kyle Larson	Joey Logano	Ford	Report
30	Hollywood Casino 400	Joey Logano	Kyle Larson	Kyle Larson	Kyle Larson	Chevrolet	Report
31	South Point 400	Denny Hamlin	Chase Briscoe	Denny Hamlin	Chase Briscoe	Toyota	Report
32	Bank of America 400	Kyle Larson	Kyle Larson	Kyle Larson	Chase Briscoe	Toyota	Report
33	Freeway Insurance 500	Ryan Blaney	Christopher Bell	Ryan Blaney	Tyler Reddick	Toyota	Report
34	YellaWood 500	Chase Briscoe	Chris Buescher	Chase Elliott	Kyle Larson	Chevrolet	Report
35	Xfinity 500	Denny Hamlin	William Byron	William Byron	William Byron	Chevrolet	Report
36	Season Finale 400	Chase Briscoe	Denny Hamlin	Ryan Blaney	Ryan Blaney	Ford	Report

=== Drivers' championship ===
(Key) Bold – Pole position awarded by time. Italics – Pole position set by competition-based formula. * – Most laps led. ^{F} – Fastest lap. ^{1} – Stage 1 winner. ^{2} – Stage 2 winner. ^{3} – Stage 3 winner. (Note: Stage 3 winner only for the Coca-Cola 600)

Pos.	Driver	DAY	ATL	COA	PHO	LVS	DAR	MAR	BRI	KAN	TAL	TEX	GLN	CLT	NSH	MCH	POC	COR	SON	CHI	ATL	NWS	IND	IOW	RCH	NHA	DAY	DAR	GTW	BRI	KAN	LVS	CLT	PHO	TAL	MAR	HOM	Pts.	Stages
1	Kyle Larson	16	32	6	3	7	32	9	3*^{12}	2^{2}	40	34	23	5^{1}	23	4	5	3	4	34	34	15	39	33	6	5^{1}	31	5*	1^{2}	2^{F}	1*^{12F}	2	6*^{1F}	34	1	9	12	2501	304
2	Christopher Bell	35	21	3	2*^{2}	**4**^{1}	19	7	27	20^{F}	17*	38	21	2^{3}	2	31	26	39	5	2	2	19	2	2^{2F}	7	4	17	1^{2F}	19	4	6	23	2^{2}	4*	35	10	4	2452	287
3	Denny Hamlin	31	13	10	5	1*^{F}	11	**2***^{12F}	9	4*^{1}	15	2	16	3^{2}	1*^{F}	**1**	**1**^{1}	14	26	**3**	12	2	5	5	4	7	11	18	9	8	3	**16**^{F}	5	28	8	**6**	6*^{2}	2445	295
4	Ryan Blaney	27	10	8	1^{1}	16	3	6	**2**^{F}	24	37	10	11	7	8	8	10	9*^{1}	6	7	**1***^{12}	11	26	**3***^{1}	**13**^{1F}	1*^{2}	33^{2}	4	35	33*^{2}	5	5	3	**2**^{F}	38	35	1^{F}	2407	317
5	Tyler Reddick	1	1*	**1***	8	13	**1**	15	4	**1**	14	4	5	4*	6	35^{1}	2	25	36^{F}	36	8	30	10	36	11	**8**	3	3^{1}	25	18	11	3	8	1	37	12	2^{1}	2397	216
6	Chase Briscoe	36	2	37	37	8	12	14	5	3	29	23	4	33	3	10	12	17	2	1	36	3	4	6	2*	26	13	6	32	27	4	1*^{12}	1	8	**33**	14	**39**	2386	247
7	Joey Logano	3	18	15	**31**^{F}	15	33	3	7	30	39	37	38	8	14	7	34	18	24	12	9	1*^{2}	3	14	1^{2}	14	18	9	**3***^{1}	1^{1}	20	10	9	6^{12}	34^{2}	18	17	2386	247
8	William Byron	12	28	13	7	3^{2}	8	5	30	7	35	8	36	9	30	18	3	32	12	4*^{12}	16	12	21	9	9	30	22	37	4	9	7	6	39	21	2	1*^{12F}	3	2344	197
9	Ty Gibbs	23	37	4^{2}	4	5	6	4	1	9	34	36	3	6^{F}	13	25	9	15	**3**^{12}	8	4	4^{1}	12^{1}	1	15	6	34	2	18	5	17	17	34	10	17	3	11	2335	265
10	Austin Cindric	34	26^{1}	32	34	19	5	8	16	12	8	15	9	38	26	11	14	22	13	13	14	14	14	29	3	12	6	13	10	11	2	4	17	19	27	36	7	2306	191
11	Bubba Wallace	10*^{2}	8^{2}	11	6	9	34^{F}	36	11	5	36	9	29	22	32	3	21	2	22	6^{F}	29	6	28	12	20	2	20	8	14	7	9	8	37	17	22	8	5	2293	164
12	Chase Elliott	4	11	7	23	2	15	1	22	8	4	1*^{2F}	24	37	7	32*^{2}	11	12	17	11	13	17	37	15	5	25	23	14	31	23	8	7	12	3	36^{F}	2	22	2287	138
13	Daniel Suárez	13	5	25	30	18	7	20	12	19	12	6	13	1	19^{2}	6	13	13	31	14	21	9	17	23	16	17	2	21	29	14	14	14	13	7	18	28	8	2243	100
14	Carson Hocevar (Note: Both Berry and Hocevar were fined 25 points for brake-checking at the 2026 Xfinity 500.)	18^{F}	4	31	20	22	4	17	10	13	1	**7**	28	23	10	5^{F}	20	19	11	22	3	13	**9**	31	37	19^{F}	38	11	8	3	33	12	14	12	6	21		2234	156
15	Ryan Preece (Note: Preece was penalized 25 points following Texas after it was determined that he had intentionally wrecked Ty Gibbs during the race. This deduction does not carry forward to the Chase.)	25	9	18	13	11	13	12	8	11	18^{1}	14	14	34	36	28	28	11^{2}	8	32	24	10	8	20	17	9	1	10	17	10	10	28	15	18	13	23	25	2226	123
16	Chris Buescher	7	15	24	14	6	9	19	13	10	2	5	12	30	29	9	7^{F}	6	19	19	10	20	11	13	21	18	40	20	27	13	23	13	10	22	32*^{1}	24	24	2212	118
NASCAR Cup Series Chase cut-off
Pos.	Driver	DAY	ATL	COA	PHO	LVS	DAR	MAR	BRI	KAN	TAL	TEX	GLN	CLT	NSH	MCH	POC	COR	SON	CHI	ATL	NWS	IND	IOW	RCH	NHA	DAY	DAR	GTW	BRI	KAN	LVS	CLT	PHO	TAL	MAR	HOM	Pts.	Stages
17	Shane van Gisbergen	30	6	2	11	36	14	11	34	36	20	17	**1***^{2}	11	5	30	31	**38**	1*	25	6	5	16	30	14	20	28^{1}	26	23	20	24	9	7	26	30	5	34	774	83
18	Ross Chastain	20	3	35^{1F}	28	17	16	16	20	26	7^{2}	26	27^{1}	35	37	16	8	7	14	18	11	27^{F}	23^{2}	7	12	36	**24**	27	5	12	15	30	16	9	4	11	27	752	97
19	Brad Keselowski	5	17	20	15	10	2*^{12}	13	14	6	31	13	30	15	34	34	38	34	15	21	26	7	6	27	26	11	14	23	12	15	12	24	29	16	24	27	28	723	83
20	Michael McDowell	22	20	5	9	26	20	18	24	34	32	27	2	14	15	26	17	10	9	29	15	24	18	25	28	16	4	17	20	21	27	21	19	36	10	16	10	691	48
21	Todd Gilliland	39	25	21	12	34	23	23	6	17	11	32	17	20	20	22	19^{2}	21	29	16	19	8	24	22	30	21	19	16	24	19	19	33	22	14	7	15	18	656	67
22	Josh Berry (Note: Both Berry and Hocevar were fined 25 points for brake-checking at the 2026 Xfinity 500.)	9	38	26	32	31	17	10	32	27	33	29	32	29	31	15	33	29	28	33	25	36	7	4	8	3	9	7	28	6	35	26	4	11	12	4	13	651	94
23	Erik Jones	21	24	34	10	20	10	21	23	23	23	12^{1}	19	13	11	2	6	20	23	15	5	21	27	35	27	33	39	15	13	32	16	25	24	25	28	29	20	643	63
24	Austin Dillon	37	29	19	16	12	25	25	18	16	19	18	6	32	18	36	25	24	27	24	7	23	29	10	19	32	7	29	6	17	21	19	26	37	11	7	26	607	25
25	A. J. Allmendinger	19	12	9	19	24	30	27	15	31	16	25	7	18	35^{1}	17	22	5	16	17	37	37	25	8	33	23	30	22	16	22	22	15	28	23	31	25	23	606	56
26	Alex Bowman	40	23	36					37	18	3	3	25	17	33	19	27	26	10	5	22	26	19	34	10	15	8	12	2	35	18	11	38	29	9	13	16	594	43
27	Zane Smith	6^{1}	7	33	27	14	22	34	19	32	5^{F}	22	18	10	9	33	37	4	18	28	30	22	15	16	36	13	32	25	36	28	31	36	20	15	19	19	14	584	38
28	Ricky Stenhouse Jr.	2	36	28	22	29	29	30	17	21	6	19	31	12	4	29	15	33	21	26	23	34	20	18	31	28	5	35	26	30	32	32	23	30	3	30	32	527	37
29	John Hunter Nemechek	26	19	17	25	21	27	29	35	22	22	21	10	26	24	14	4*	16	25	23	18	31	32	19	22	31	15	24	15	25	13	29	35	33	39	31	30	517	32
30	Riley Herbst	8	33	23	18	23	35	35	21	14	25	11	26	21	17	13	16	8	30	10	35	18	36	21	24	34	QL^{¶}	30	34	34	25	18	18	32	26	32	33	495	37
31	Noah Gragson	11	14	22	36	30	26	28	26	28	9	28	22	24	16	27	35	35	32	27	27	25	22	17	18	10	26^{F}	32	33	16	36	20	25	13	20	26	9	486	4
32	Cole Custer	24	22^{F}	29	35	27	28	31	28	25	38	35	15	16	21	12	24	31	20	31	17	28	13	28	29	22	10	33	11	26	30	27	27	27	5	34	29	450	3
33	Connor Zilisch **(R)**	33	30	14	29	32	18	26	33	29	26	16	20^{F}	39	38	37	23	37	7	38	28	32	34	11	25	35	25	34	7	24	29	35	21	20	29	17	19	410	18
34	Ty Dillon	14	16	16	26	33	31	37	29	33	13	24	33	25	12	24	32	30	35	20	20	16	30	24	32	27	21	31	30	36	28	31	30	31	15	22	31	395	–
35	Cody Ware	17	27	30	24	35	36	32	31	37	21	30	37	28	22	23	30	23	33	30	32^{F}	29	31	32	34	29	35	36	22	31	34	34	31	35	16	33	35	264	4
36	Kyle Busch (Note: After Busch's death, NASCAR initially removed him from their points standings. However, his name was added back following the Season Finale 400.)	**15**	34	12	17	28	21	24	25	35	10	20	8	Wth																								217	22
37	Casey Mears	32	Wth								DNQ						36						35				37								40		37	15	3
38	Kevin Magnussen																	27^{F}																				11	–
39	Jimmie Johnson	29																28																				9	–
40	Katherine Legge												35	31																								8	–
41	B. J. McLeod	41	35																		38											33						8	–
Ineligible for driver points
Pos.	Driver	DAY	ATL	COA	PHO	LVS	DAR	MAR	BRI	KAN	TAL	TEX	GLN	CLT	NSH	MCH	POC	COR	SON	CHI	ATL	NWS	IND	IOW	RCH	NHA	DAY	DAR	GTW	BRI	KAN	LVS	CLT	PHO	TAL	MAR	HOM	Pts.	Stage
	Corey Heim	28								15		31		19	25			1		9			1*^{F}				16	19					11	5			40		
	Harrison Burton																										12												
	Austin Hill				21			33						27	27	20	18	36	34	37	31	33	33	26	23	24	27*	28	21	29	26	22	32	24	14	20	15		
	J. J. Yeley	DNQ	31													21				35																	36		
	Joey Gase										30																36								21				
	Justin Haley																																				21		
	Justin Allgaier	38				25	24	22																															
	Gray Gaulding																										DNQ						36		23				
	Daniel Dye										24						29						38				29								25				
	Jesse Love			27							27																												
	Chad Finchum								36		28	33			28						33	35						38									38		
	Anthony Alfredo	DNQ			33																																		
	Josh Bilicki												34							Wth					35					37						37			
	Timmy Hill						37							36																									
	Corey LaJoie	DNQ																																					
	Chandler Smith	DNQ																																					
	Myatt Snider			RL^{†}																																			
	Brent Crews																	RL^{‡}																					
Pos.	Driver	DAY	ATL	COA	PHO	LVS	DAR	MAR	BRI	KAN	TAL	TEX	GLN	CLT	NSH	MCH	POC	COR	SON	CHI	ATL	NWS	IND	IOW	RCH	NHA	DAY	DAR	GTW	BRI	KAN	LVS	CLT	PHO	TAL	MAR	HOM	Pts.	Stage
^{†} – Relieved for Alex Bowman^{‡} – Relieved for Christopher Bell^{¶} – Qualified but replaced by Harrison Burton

=== Manufacturers' championship ===
Pos	Manufacturer	Wins	Points
1	Toyota	18	1589
2	Chevrolet	10	1416
3	Ford	8	1342

== See also ==
- 2026 NASCAR O'Reilly Auto Parts Series
- 2026 NASCAR Craftsman Truck Series
- 2026 ARCA Menards Series
- 2026 ARCA Menards Series East
- 2026 ARCA Menards Series West
- 2026 NASCAR Whelen Modified Tour
- 2026 NASCAR Euro Series
- 2026 NASCAR Canada Series
- 2026 NASCAR Brasil Series
