= 2026 Cook Out Clash =

Non-points exhibition NASCAR race

Race details
- Race 1 of 2 exhibition races in the 2026 NASCAR Cup Series
- Date: February 4, 2026
- Location: Bowman Gray Stadium in Winston-Salem, North Carolina
- Distance: 200 laps, 50 mi (80 km)
- Weather: Wintery mix with a temperature around 33 °F (1 °C).
- Average speed: 21.390 miles per hour (34.424 km/h)

Pole position
Driver	Kyle Larson	Hendrick Motorsports
- Time: 14.137

Most laps led
Driver	Kyle Larson	Hendrick Motorsports
- Laps: 67

Winner
No. 60	Ryan Preece	RFK Racing

Television in the United States
- Network: Fox/FS2
- Announcers: Mike Joy, Clint Bowyer, and Kevin Harvick

Radio in the United States
- Radio: MRN
- Booth announcers: Alex Hayden and Todd Gordon
- Turn announcers: Dave Moody (Backstretch)

The 2026 Cook Out Clash was a non-championship exhibition NASCAR Cup Series race that was held on February 4, 2026, postponed three days from February 1, at Bowman Gray Stadium in Winston-Salem, North Carolina. Contested over 200 laps, it was the first exhibition race of the 2026 NASCAR Cup Series season.

Ryan Preece won the race, joining Jeff Gordon and Denny Hamlin as a driver to win the Clash before winning their first points race. William Byron finished 2nd, and Ryan Blaney finished 3rd. Daniel Suárez and Denny Hamlin rounded out the top five, and Chase Briscoe, Austin Dillon, Chris Buescher, Ross Chastain, and Alex Bowman rounded out the top ten.

Due to snowfall around the area, the race was postponed multiple times to Wednesday, February 4. This was the first Cup Series race on a Wednesday since the 2020 Autotrader EchoPark Automotive 500.

== Report ==
=== Background ===
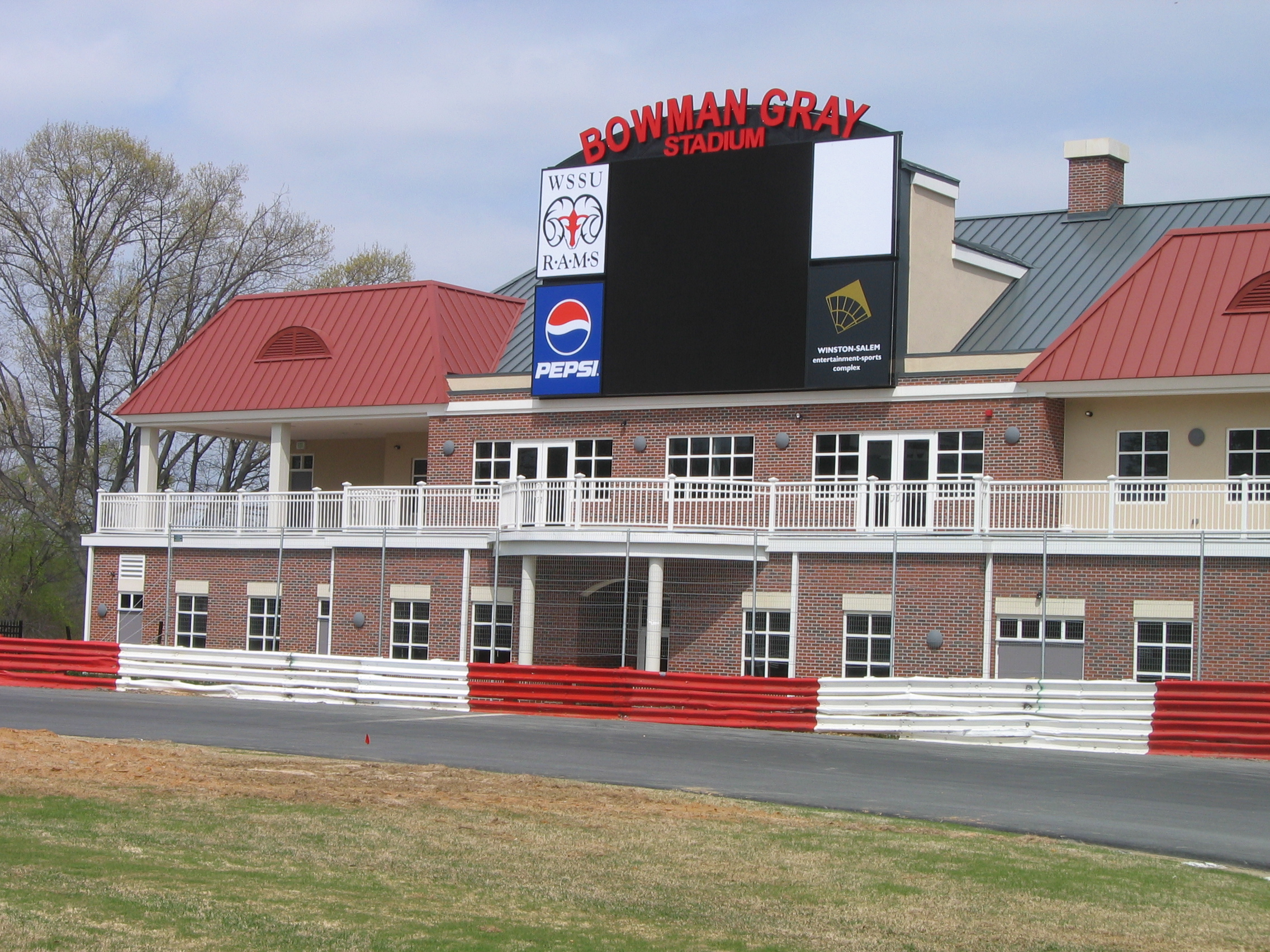
Bowman Gray Stadium, the track where the race will be held.

Bowman Gray Stadium is a NASCAR sanctioned 1/4-mile (0.40 km) asphalt flat oval short track and longstanding football stadium located in Winston-Salem, North Carolina. It is one of stock car racing's most legendary venues, and is referred to as "NASCAR's longest-running weekly race track". Bowman Gray Stadium is part of the Winston-Salem Sports and Entertainment Complex and is home of the Winston-Salem State University Rams football team. It was also the home of the Wake Forest University football team from 1956 until Groves Stadium (later BB&T Field) opened in 1968.

On August 17, 2024, NASCAR announced that the Clash would be moved to Bowman Gray Stadium, becoming the first NASCAR-sanctioned race at the track since 1971.

Scrutineering will take place at Charlotte Motor Speedway. Post-race inspection will take place in both Winston-Salem and also at NASCAR facilities in Charlotte.

On January 29, 2026, NASCAR announced that practice and qualifying, and the Last Chance Qualifier, would be held on February 1 due to weather and extreme coldness. The four heat races would be canceled. On January 31, it was announced the race would be postponed to February 2. On February 1, 2026, it was announced that the Clash would be postponed to Wednesday, February 4.

==== Entry list ====
- (R) denotes rookie driver.
- (i) denotes driver who is ineligible for series driver points.

No.	Driver	Team	Manufacturer
1	Ross Chastain	Trackhouse Racing	Chevrolet
2	Austin Cindric	Team Penske	Ford
3	Austin Dillon	Richard Childress Racing	Chevrolet
4	Noah Gragson	Front Row Motorsports	Ford
5	Kyle Larson	Hendrick Motorsports	Chevrolet
6	Corey LaJoie	RFK Racing	Ford
7	Daniel Suárez	Spire Motorsports	Chevrolet
8	Kyle Busch	Richard Childress Racing	Chevrolet
9	Chase Elliott	Hendrick Motorsports	Chevrolet
10	Ty Dillon	Kaulig Racing	Chevrolet
11	Denny Hamlin	Joe Gibbs Racing	Toyota
12	Ryan Blaney	Team Penske	Ford
16	A. J. Allmendinger	Kaulig Racing	Chevrolet
17	Chris Buescher	RFK Racing	Ford
19	Chase Briscoe	Joe Gibbs Racing	Toyota
20	Christopher Bell	Joe Gibbs Racing	Toyota
21	Josh Berry	Wood Brothers Racing	Ford
22	Joey Logano	Team Penske	Ford
23	Bubba Wallace	23XI Racing	Toyota
24	William Byron	Hendrick Motorsports	Chevrolet
34	Todd Gilliland	Front Row Motorsports	Ford
35	Riley Herbst	23XI Racing	Toyota
38	Zane Smith	Front Row Motorsports	Ford
41	Cole Custer	Haas Factory Team	Chevrolet
42	John Hunter Nemechek	Legacy Motor Club	Toyota
43	Erik Jones	Legacy Motor Club	Toyota
45	Tyler Reddick	23XI Racing	Toyota
47	Ricky Stenhouse Jr.	Hyak Motorsports	Chevrolet
48	Alex Bowman	Hendrick Motorsports	Chevrolet
50	Burt Myers	Team AmeriVet	Chevrolet
51	Cody Ware	Rick Ware Racing	Chevrolet
54	Ty Gibbs	Joe Gibbs Racing	Toyota
60	Ryan Preece	RFK Racing	Ford
66	Chad Finchum (i)	Garage 66	Ford
71	Michael McDowell	Spire Motorsports	Chevrolet
77	Carson Hocevar	Spire Motorsports	Chevrolet
88	Connor Zilisch (R)	Trackhouse Racing	Chevrolet
97	Shane van Gisbergen	Trackhouse Racing	Chevrolet
Official entry list

== Practice ==
Christopher Bell was the fastest in the practice session with a time of 14.193 with an average speed of 63.411 mph (102.050 km/h).

=== Practice results ===
Pos	No.	Driver	Team	Manufacturer	Time	Speed
1	20	Christopher Bell	Joe Gibbs Racing	Toyota	14.193	63.411
2	12	Ryan Blaney	Team Penske	Ford	14.219	63.295
3	1	Ross Chastain	Trackhouse Racing	Chevrolet	14.255	63.135
Official practice results

== Qualifying ==
Kyle Larson scored the pole for the race with a time of 14.137 and a speed of 63.662 mph (102.454 km/h). Josh Berry will start on the pole for the Last Chance Qualifier.

=== Qualifying results ===
Pos	No.	Driver	Team	Manufacturer	Time
1	5	Kyle Larson	Hendrick Motorsports	Chevrolet	14.137
2	24	William Byron	Hendrick Motorsports	Chevrolet	14.141
3	54	Ty Gibbs	Joe Gibbs Racing	Toyota	14.146
4	19	Chase Briscoe	Joe Gibbs Racing	Toyota	14.147
5	20	Christopher Bell	Joe Gibbs Racing	Toyota	14.150
6	11	Denny Hamlin	Joe Gibbs Racing	Toyota	14.151
7	23	Bubba Wallace	23XI Racing	Toyota	14.153
8	17	Chris Buescher	RFK Racing	Ford	14.167
9	1	Ross Chastain	Trackhouse Racing	Chevrolet	14.184
10	45	Tyler Reddick	23XI Racing	Toyota	14.195
11	9	Chase Elliott	Hendrick Motorsports	Chevrolet	14.198
12	77	Carson Hocevar	Spire Motorsports	Chevrolet	14.204
13	8	Kyle Busch	Richard Childress Racing	Chevrolet	14.209
14	22	Joey Logano	Team Penske	Ford	14.211
15	3	Austin Dillon	Richard Childress Racing	Chevrolet	14.213
16	12	Ryan Blaney	Team Penske	Ford	14.215
17	97	Shane van Gisbergen	Trackhouse Racing	Chevrolet	14.231
18	60	Ryan Preece	RFK Racing	Ford	14.234
19	88	Connor Zilisch (R)	Trackhouse Racing	Chevrolet	14.237
20	7	Daniel Suárez	Spire Motorsports	Chevrolet	14.242
21	21	Josh Berry	Wood Brothers Racing	Ford	14.243
22	71	Michael McDowell	Spire Motorsports	Chevrolet	14.245
23	2	Austin Cindric	Team Penske	Ford	14.263
24	6	Corey LaJoie	RFK Racing	Ford	14.272
25	48	Alex Bowman	Hendrick Motorsports	Chevrolet	14.290
26	35	Riley Herbst	23XI Racing	Toyota	14.299
27	51	Cody Ware	Rick Ware Racing	Chevrolet	14.314
28	16	A. J. Allmendinger	Kaulig Racing	Chevrolet	14.323
29	41	Cole Custer	Haas Factory Team	Chevrolet	14.334
30	42	John Hunter Nemechek	Legacy Motor Club	Toyota	14.351
31	34	Todd Gilliland	Front Row Motorsports	Ford	14.372
32	10	Ty Dillon	Kaulig Racing	Chevrolet	14.392
33	4	Noah Gragson	Front Row Motorsports	Ford	14.413
34	47	Ricky Stenhouse Jr.	Hyak Motorsports	Chevrolet	14.448
35	38	Zane Smith	Front Row Motorsports	Ford	14.455
36	43	Erik Jones	Legacy Motor Club	Toyota	14.493
37	66	Chad Finchum	Garage 66	Ford	14.515
38	50	Burt Myers	Team AmeriVet	Chevrolet	15.024
Official qualifying results

=== "Last Chance" qualifying race ===
Pos	Grid	No	Driver	Team	Manufacturer	Laps
1	1	21	Josh Berry	Wood Brothers Racing	Ford	75
2	3	2	Austin Cindric	Team Penske	Ford	75
3	4	6	Corey LaJoie	RFK Racing	Ford	75
4	8	16	A. J. Allmendinger	Kaulig Racing	Chevrolet	75
5	10	42	John Hunter Nemechek	Legacy Motor Club	Toyota	75
6	15	38	Zane Smith	Front Row Motorsports	Ford	75
7	13	4	Noah Gragson	Front Row Motorsports	Ford	75
8	12	10	Ty Dillon	Kaulig Racing	Chevrolet	75
9	14	47	Ricky Stenhouse Jr.	Hyak Motorsports	Chevrolet	75
10	16	43	Erik Jones	Legacy Motor Club	Toyota	74
11	2	71	Michael McDowell	Spire Motorsports	Chevrolet	74
12	9	41	Cole Custer	Haas Factory Team	Chevrolet	73
13	17	66	Chad Finchum	Garage 66	Ford	73
14	18	50	Burt Myers	Team AmeriVet	Chevrolet	73
15	7	51	Cody Ware	Rick Ware Racing	Chevrolet	73
16	6	35	Riley Herbst	23XI Racing	Toyota	72
17	5	48	Alex Bowman	Hendrick Motorsports	Chevrolet	56
18	11	34	Todd Gilliland	Front Row Motorsports	Ford	47
Official last chance race results

Josh Berry and Austin Cindric, the top two finishers, qualified for the main event. Alex Bowman also qualified as the highest driver in previous season's standings that have not yet qualified.

=== Starting lineup ===
Pos	No.	Driver	Team	Manufacturer
1	5	Kyle Larson	Hendrick Motorsports	Chevrolet
2	24	William Byron	Hendrick Motorsports	Chevrolet
3	54	Ty Gibbs	Joe Gibbs Racing	Toyota
4	19	Chase Briscoe	Joe Gibbs Racing	Toyota
5	20	Christopher Bell	Joe Gibbs Racing	Toyota
6	11	Denny Hamlin	Joe Gibbs Racing	Toyota
7	23	Bubba Wallace	23XI Racing	Toyota
8	17	Chris Buescher	RFK Racing	Ford
9	1	Ross Chastain	Trackhouse Racing	Chevrolet
10	45	Tyler Reddick	23XI Racing	Toyota
11	9	Chase Elliott	Hendrick Motorsports	Chevrolet
12	77	Carson Hocevar	Spire Motorsports	Chevrolet
13	8	Kyle Busch	Richard Childress Racing	Chevrolet
14	22	Joey Logano	Team Penske	Ford
15	3	Austin Dillon	Richard Childress Racing	Chevrolet
16	12	Ryan Blaney	Team Penske	Ford
17	97	Shane van Gisbergen	Trackhouse Racing	Chevrolet
18	60	Ryan Preece	RFK Racing	Ford
19	88	Connor Zilisch (R)	Trackhouse Racing	Chevrolet
20	7	Daniel Suárez	Spire Motorsports	Chevrolet
21	21	Josh Berry	Wood Brothers Racing	Ford
22	2	Austin Cindric	Team Penske	Ford
23	48	Alex Bowman	Hendrick Motorsports	Chevrolet
Official starting lineup

== Race ==
=== Race results ===
Pos	Grid	No	Driver	Team	Manufacturer	Laps
1	18	60	Ryan Preece	RFK Racing	Ford	200
2	2	24	William Byron	Hendrick Motorsports	Chevrolet	200
3	16	12	Ryan Blaney	Team Penske	Ford	200
4	20	7	Daniel Suárez	Spire Motorsports	Chevrolet	200
5	6	11	Denny Hamlin	Joe Gibbs Racing	Toyota	200
6	4	19	Chase Briscoe	Joe Gibbs Racing	Toyota	200
7	15	3	Austin Dillon	Richard Childress Racing	Chevrolet	200
8	8	17	Chris Buescher	RFK Racing	Ford	200
9	9	1	Ross Chastain	Trackhouse Racing	Chevrolet	200
10	23	48	Alex Bowman	Hendrick Motorsports	Chevrolet	200
11	14	22	Joey Logano	Team Penske	Ford	200
12	21	21	Josh Berry	Wood Brothers Racing	Ford	200
13	5	20	Christopher Bell	Joe Gibbs Racing	Toyota	200
14	3	54	Ty Gibbs	Joe Gibbs Racing	Toyota	200
15	12	77	Carson Hocevar	Spire Motorsports	Chevrolet	200
16	1	5	Kyle Larson	Hendrick Motorsports	Chevrolet	200
17	11	9	Chase Elliott	Hendrick Motorsports	Chevrolet	200
18	19	88	Connor Zilisch (R)	Trackhouse Racing	Chevrolet	200
19	13	8	Kyle Busch	Richard Childress Racing	Chevrolet	200
20	17	97	Shane van Gisbergen	Trackhouse Racing	Chevrolet	200
21	22	2	Austin Cindric	Team Penske	Ford	200
22	10	45	Tyler Reddick	23XI Racing	Toyota	200
23	7	23	Bubba Wallace	23XI Racing	Toyota	199
Official race results

== Media ==
=== Television ===
Fox covered the race on the television side. Due to time constraints, the race went over the 3-hour window provided by Fox, the race moved to FS2 after 9:00 PM EST. Mike Joy, Clint Bowyer, and three-time Clash winner Kevin Harvick handled the call in the booth for the race. Josh Sims and Regan Smith handled the pit road duties, and Larry McReynolds provided insight on-site during the race.

FOX/FS2
Booth announcers	Pit reporters	In-race analyst
Lap-by-lap: Mike Joy; Color-commentator: Clint Bowyer; Color-commentator: Kevin Harvick	Josh Sims; Regan Smith	Larry McReynolds

=== Radio ===
MRN covered the radio call for the race, which was also simulcast on Sirius XM NASCAR Radio. Alex Hayden and Todd Gordon called the action from the broadcast booth when the field raced down the front straightaway. Dave Moody called the action for MRN when the field raced down the backstretch. MRN Lead Pit Reporter Steve Post, Chris Wilner & Jacklyn Drake covered the action for MRN on pit lane.

MRN Radio
Booth announcers	Turn announcers	Pit reporters
Lead announcer: Alex Hayden; Announcer: Todd Gordon	Backstretch: Dave Moody	Steve Post; Chris Wilner; Jacklyn Drake

Previous race: 2025 NASCAR Cup Series Championship Race (points)	NASCAR Cup Series; 2026 season	Next race: 2026 America 250 Florida Duel at Daytona (exhibition)
