= 2026 Würth 400 =

NASCAR Cup Series race

2026 Würth 400 presented by LIQUI MOLY
Race details
- Race 11 of 36 in the 2026 NASCAR Cup Series
- Date: May 3, 2026
- Location: Texas Motor Speedway in Fort Worth, Texas
- Course: Permanent racing facility
- Course length: 1.5 miles (2.4 km)
- Distance: 267 laps, 400.5 mi (644.541 km)
- Weather: Clear 81 °F (27 °C)
- Average speed: 136.315 miles per hour (219.378 km/h)

Pole position
Driver	Carson Hocevar	Spire Motorsports
- Time: 28.222

Most laps led
Driver	Chase Elliott	Hendrick Motorsports
- Laps: 87

Fastest lap
Driver	Chase Elliott	Hendrick Motorsports
- Time: 28.890

Winner
No. 9	Chase Elliott	Hendrick Motorsports

Television in the United States
- Network: FS1
- Announcers: Mike Joy, Clint Bowyer, and Kevin Harvick

Radio in the United States
- Radio: PRN
- Booth announcers: Brad Gillie and Nick Yeoman
- Turn announcers: Andrew Kurland (1 & 2) and Pat Patterson (3 & 4)

The 2026 Würth 400 was an NASCAR Cup Series race that was held on May 3, 2026, at Texas Motor Speedway in Fort Worth, Texas. Contested over 267 laps on the 1.5 mile (2.4 km) intermediate quad-oval, it was the eleventh race of the 2026 NASCAR Cup Series season.

Chase Elliott won the race. Denny Hamlin finished 2nd, and Alex Bowman finished 3rd. Tyler Reddick and Chris Buescher rounded out the top five, and Daniel Suárez, Carson Hocevar, William Byron, Bubba Wallace, and Ryan Blaney rounded out the top ten.

== Report ==
=== Background ===
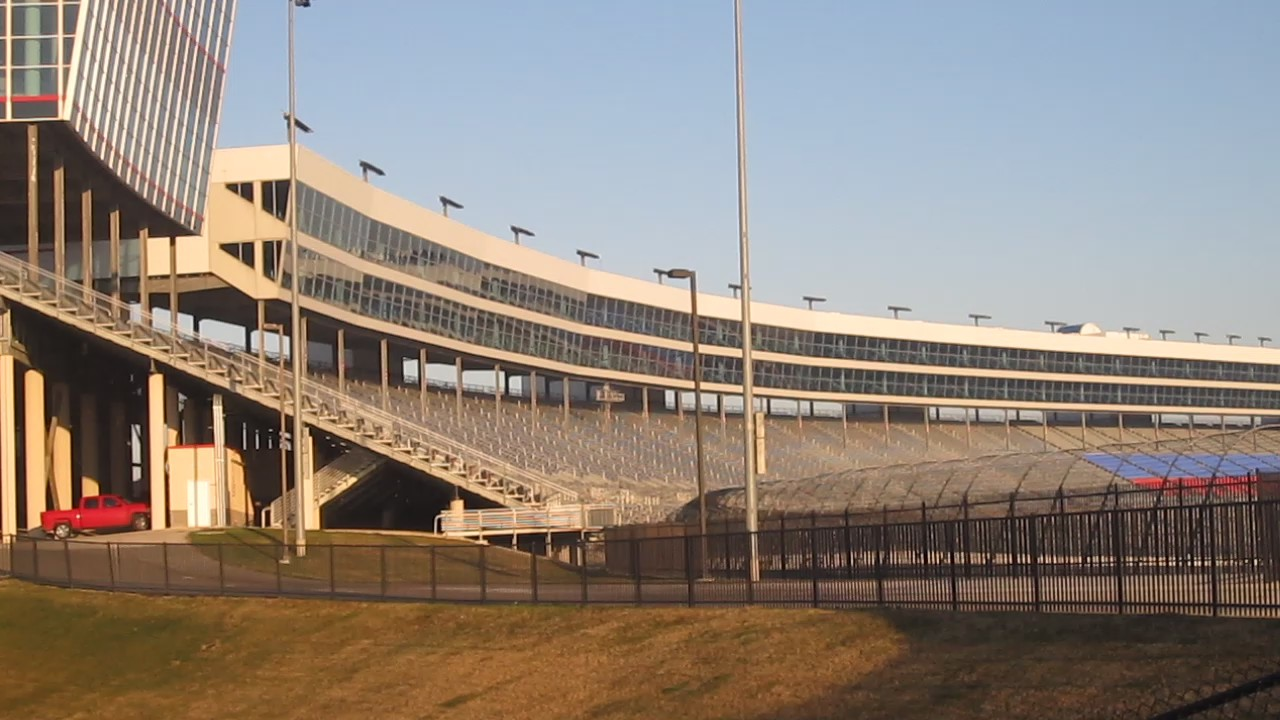
Texas Motor Speedway, the track where the race will be held.

Texas Motor Speedway is a speedway located in the northernmost portion of the U.S. city of Fort Worth, Texas – the portion located in Denton County, Texas. The track measures 1.5 miles (2.4 km) around and is banked 24 degrees in the turns, and is of the oval design, where the front straightaway juts outward slightly. The track layout is similar to Atlanta Motor Speedway and Charlotte Motor Speedway. The track is owned by Speedway Motorsports, Inc., the same company that owns Atlanta and Charlotte Motor Speedway, as well as the short-track Bristol Motor Speedway.

==== Entry list ====
- (R) denotes rookie driver.
- (i) denotes driver who is ineligible for series driver points.

No.	Driver	Team	Manufacturer
1	Ross Chastain	Trackhouse Racing	Chevrolet
2	Austin Cindric	Team Penske	Ford
3	Austin Dillon	Richard Childress Racing	Chevrolet
4	Noah Gragson	Front Row Motorsports	Ford
5	Kyle Larson	Hendrick Motorsports	Chevrolet
6	Brad Keselowski	RFK Racing	Ford
7	Daniel Suárez	Spire Motorsports	Chevrolet
8	Kyle Busch	Richard Childress Racing	Chevrolet
9	Chase Elliott	Hendrick Motorsports	Chevrolet
10	Ty Dillon	Kaulig Racing	Chevrolet
11	Denny Hamlin	Joe Gibbs Racing	Toyota
12	Ryan Blaney	Team Penske	Ford
16	A. J. Allmendinger	Kaulig Racing	Chevrolet
17	Chris Buescher	RFK Racing	Ford
19	Chase Briscoe	Joe Gibbs Racing	Toyota
20	Christopher Bell	Joe Gibbs Racing	Toyota
21	Josh Berry	Wood Brothers Racing	Ford
22	Joey Logano	Team Penske	Ford
23	Bubba Wallace	23XI Racing	Toyota
24	William Byron	Hendrick Motorsports	Chevrolet
34	Todd Gilliland	Front Row Motorsports	Ford
35	Riley Herbst	23XI Racing	Toyota
38	Zane Smith	Front Row Motorsports	Ford
41	Cole Custer	Haas Factory Team	Chevrolet
42	John Hunter Nemechek	Legacy Motor Club	Toyota
43	Erik Jones	Legacy Motor Club	Toyota
45	Tyler Reddick	23XI Racing	Toyota
47	Ricky Stenhouse Jr.	Hyak Motorsports	Chevrolet
48	Alex Bowman	Hendrick Motorsports	Chevrolet
51	Cody Ware	Rick Ware Racing	Chevrolet
54	Ty Gibbs	Joe Gibbs Racing	Toyota
60	Ryan Preece	RFK Racing	Ford
66	Chad Finchum (i)	Garage 66	Ford
67	Corey Heim (i)	23XI Racing	Toyota
71	Michael McDowell	Spire Motorsports	Chevrolet
77	Carson Hocevar	Spire Motorsports	Chevrolet
88	Connor Zilisch (R)	Trackhouse Racing	Chevrolet
97	Shane van Gisbergen	Trackhouse Racing	Chevrolet
Official entry list

== Practice ==
William Byron was the fastest in the practice session with a time of 28.527 seconds and a speed of 189.294 mph (304.639 km/h).

=== Practice results ===
Pos	No.	Driver	Team	Manufacturer	Time	Speed
1	24	William Byron	Hendrick Motorsports	Chevrolet	28.527	189.294
2	71	Michael McDowell	Spire Motorsports	Chevrolet	28.646	188.507
3	67	Corey Heim (i)	23XI Racing	Toyota	28.675	188.317
Official practice results

== Qualifying ==
Carson Hocevar scored the pole for the race with a time of 28.222 and a speed of 191.340 mph (307.932 km/h).

=== Qualifying results ===
Pos	No.	Driver	Team	Manufacturer	Time	Speed
1	77	Carson Hocevar	Spire Motorsports	Chevrolet	28.222	191.340
2	7	Daniel Suárez	Spire Motorsports	Chevrolet	28.225	191.320
3	17	Chris Buescher	RFK Racing	Ford	28.275	190.981
4	11	Denny Hamlin	Joe Gibbs Racing	Toyota	28.304	190.786
5	19	Chase Briscoe	Joe Gibbs Racing	Toyota	28.304	190.786
6	8	Kyle Busch	Richard Childress Racing	Chevrolet	28.330	190.611
7	20	Christopher Bell	Joe Gibbs Racing	Toyota	28.353	190.456
8	45	Tyler Reddick	23XI Racing	Toyota	28.359	190.416
9	48	Alex Bowman	Hendrick Motorsports	Chevrolet	28.364	190.382
10	54	Ty Gibbs	Joe Gibbs Racing	Toyota	28.396	190.168
11	5	Kyle Larson	Hendrick Motorsports	Chevrolet	28.411	190.067
12	88	Connor Zilisch (R)	Trackhouse Racing	Chevrolet	28.430	189.940
13	2	Austin Cindric	Team Penske	Ford	28.442	189.860
14	9	Chase Elliott	Hendrick Motorsports	Chevrolet	28.454	189.780
15	24	William Byron	Hendrick Motorsports	Chevrolet	28.467	189.693
16	1	Ross Chastain	Trackhouse Racing	Chevrolet	28.507	189.427
17	67	Corey Heim (i)	23XI Racing	Toyota	28.520	189.341
18	35	Riley Herbst	23XI Racing	Toyota	28.537	189.228
19	71	Michael McDowell	Spire Motorsports	Chevrolet	28.548	189.155
20	60	Ryan Preece	RFK Racing	Ford	28.552	189.129
21	43	Erik Jones	Legacy Motor Club	Toyota	28.579	188.950
22	47	Ricky Stenhouse Jr.	Hyak Motorsports	Chevrolet	28.606	188.772
23	22	Joey Logano	Team Penske	Ford	28.618	188.692
24	21	Josh Berry	Wood Brothers Racing	Ford	28.619	188.686
25	6	Brad Keselowski	RFK Racing	Ford	28.656	188.442
26	16	A. J. Allmendinger	Kaulig Racing	Chevrolet	28.662	188.403
27	41	Cole Custer	Haas Factory Team	Chevrolet	28.676	188.311
28	4	Noah Gragson	Front Row Motorsports	Ford	28.694	188.193
29	51	Cody Ware	Rick Ware Racing	Chevrolet	28.726	187.983
30	97	Shane van Gisbergen	Trackhouse Racing	Chevrolet	28.738	187.905
31	12	Ryan Blaney	Team Penske	Ford	28.754	187.800
32	34	Todd Gilliland	Front Row Motorsports	Ford	28.772	187.682
33	42	John Hunter Nemechek	Legacy Motor Club	Toyota	28.774	187.669
34	38	Zane Smith	Front Row Motorsports	Ford	28.833	187.285
35	10	Ty Dillon	Kaulig Racing	Chevrolet	29.134	185.350
36	66	Chad Finchum (i)	Garage 66	Ford	30.613	176.396
37	23	Bubba Wallace	23XI Racing	Toyota	0.000	0.000
38	3	Austin Dillon	Richard Childress Racing	Chevrolet	0.000	0.000
Official qualifying results

== Race ==
=== Race results ===
==== Stage Results ====
Stage One Laps: 80

Pos	No	Driver	Team	Manufacturer	Points
1	43	Erik Jones	Legacy Motor Club	Toyota	10
2	77	Carson Hocevar	Spire Motorsports	Chevrolet	9
3	47	Ricky Stenhouse Jr.	Hyak Motorsports	Chevrolet	8
4	54	Ty Gibbs	Joe Gibbs Racing	Toyota	7
5	19	Chase Briscoe	Joe Gibbs Racing	Toyota	6
6	8	Kyle Busch	Richard Childress Racing	Chevrolet	5
7	16	A. J. Allmendinger	Kaulig Racing	Chevrolet	4
8	9	Chase Elliott	Hendrick Motorsports	Chevrolet	3
9	24	William Byron	Hendrick Motorsports	Chevrolet	2
10	11	Denny Hamlin	Joe Gibbs Racing	Toyota	1

Stage Two Laps: 85

Pos	No	Driver	Team	Manufacturer	Points
1	9	Chase Elliott	Hendrick Motorsports	Chevrolet	10
2	45	Tyler Reddick	23XI Racing	Toyota	9
3	6	Brad Keselowski	RFK Racing	Ford	8
4	11	Denny Hamlin	Joe Gibbs Racing	Toyota	7
5	60	Ryan Preece	RFK Racing	Ford	6
6	7	Daniel Suárez	Spire Motorsports	Chevrolet	5
7	17	Chris Buescher	RFK Racing	Ford	4
8	35	Riley Herbst	23XI Racing	Toyota	3
9	77	Carson Hocevar	Spire Motorsports	Chevrolet	2
10	48	Alex Bowman	Hendrick Motorsports	Chevrolet	1

=== Final Stage Results ===
Stage Three Laps: 102

Pos	Grid	No	Driver	Team	Manufacturer	Laps	Points
1	14	9	Chase Elliott	Hendrick Motorsports	Chevrolet	267	69
2	4	11	Denny Hamlin	Joe Gibbs Racing	Toyota	267	43
3	9	48	Alex Bowman	Hendrick Motorsports	Chevrolet	267	35
4	8	45	Tyler Reddick	23XI Racing	Toyota	267	42
5	3	17	Chris Buescher	RFK Racing	Ford	267	36
6	2	7	Daniel Suárez	Spire Motorsports	Chevrolet	267	36
7	1	77	Carson Hocevar	Spire Motorsports	Chevrolet	267	41
8	15	24	William Byron	Hendrick Motorsports	Chevrolet	267	31
9	37	23	Bubba Wallace	23XI Racing	Toyota	267	28
10	31	12	Ryan Blaney	Team Penske	Ford	267	27
11	18	35	Riley Herbst	23XI Racing	Toyota	267	29
12	21	43	Erik Jones	Legacy Motor Club	Toyota	267	35
13	25	6	Brad Keselowski	RFK Racing	Ford	267	32
14	20	60	Ryan Preece	RFK Racing	Ford	267	4
15	13	2	Austin Cindric	Team Penske	Ford	267	22
16	12	88	Connor Zilisch (R)	Trackhouse Racing	Chevrolet	267	21
17	30	97	Shane van Gisbergen	Trackhouse Racing	Chevrolet	267	20
18	38	3	Austin Dillon	Richard Childress Racing	Chevrolet	267	19
19	22	47	Ricky Stenhouse Jr.	Hyak Motorsports	Chevrolet	267	26
20	6	8	Kyle Busch	Richard Childress Racing	Chevrolet	267	22
21	33	42	John Hunter Nemechek	Legacy Motor Club	Toyota	266	16
22	34	38	Zane Smith	Front Row Motorsports	Ford	266	15
23	5	19	Chase Briscoe	Joe Gibbs Racing	Toyota	266	20
24	35	10	Ty Dillon	Kaulig Racing	Chevrolet	266	13
25	26	16	A. J. Allmendinger	Kaulig Racing	Chevrolet	266	16
26	16	1	Ross Chastain	Trackhouse Racing	Chevrolet	266	11
27	19	71	Michael McDowell	Spire Motorsports	Chevrolet	266	10
28	28	4	Noah Gragson	Front Row Motorsports	Ford	266	9
29	24	21	Josh Berry	Wood Brothers Racing	Ford	266	8
30	29	51	Cody Ware	Rick Ware Racing	Chevrolet	265	7
31	17	67	Corey Heim (i)	23XI Racing	Toyota	254	0
32	32	34	Todd Gilliland	Front Row Motorsprots	Ford	254	5
33	36	66	Chad Finchum (i)	Garage 66	Ford	223	0
34	11	5	Kyle Larson	Hendrick Motorsports	Chevrolet	180	3
35	27	41	Cole Custer	Haas Factory Team	Chevrolet	173	2
36	10	54	Ty Gibbs	Joe Gibbs Racing	Toyota	110	8
37	23	22	Joey Logano	Team Penske	Ford	94	1
38	7	20	Christopher Bell	Joe Gibbs Racing	Toyota	67	1
Official race results

=== Race statistics ===
- Lead changes: 23 among 11 different drivers
- Cautions/Laps: 7 for 40 laps
- Red flags: 0
- Time of race: 2 hours, 56 minutes and 17 seconds
- Average speed: 136.315 miles per hour (219.378 km/h)

== Media ==
=== Television ===
Fox Sports will cover the race on the television side Mike Joy, Clint Bowyer and three-time Texas winner Kevin Harvick will call the race from the broadcast booth. Jamie Little, Regan Smith, and Josh Sims will handle pit road for the television side, and Larry McReynolds will provide insight on-site during the race.

FS1
Booth announcers	Pit reporters	In-race analyst
Lap-by-lap: Mike Joy; Color-commentator: Clint Bowyer; Color-commentator: Kevin Harvick	Jamie Little; Regan Smith; Josh Sims	Larry McReynolds

=== Radio ===
PRN had the radio call for the race, which was also simulcast on Sirius XM NASCAR Radio. Brad Gillie & Nick Yeoman covered the action for PRN when the field raced down the front straightaway. Andrew Kurland covered the action for PRN from a platform outside of Turns 1 & 2, & Pat Patterson covered the action from a platform outside of Turns 3 & 4 for PRN. Alan Cavanna, Brett McMillan, and Heather Debeaux had the call from pit lane for PRN.

PRN
Booth announcers	Turn announcers	Pit reporters
Lead announcer: Brad Gillie; Announcer: Nick Yeoman	Turns 1 & 2: Andrew Kurland; Turns 3 & 4: Pat Patterson	Alan Cavanna; Brett McMillan; Heather Debeaux

== Standings after the race ==
Drivers' Championship standings

	Pos	Driver	Points
	1	Tyler Reddick	526
	2	Denny Hamlin	417 (–109)
1	3	Chase Elliott	409 (–117)
1	4	Ryan Blaney	371 (–155)
2	5	Chris Buescher	345 (–181)
2	6	Carson Hocevar	333 (–193)
2	7	Ty Gibbs	330 (–196)
2	8	Kyle Larson	318 (–208)
1	9	Brad Keselowski	311 (–215)
1	10	William Byron	308 (–218)
1	11	Bubba Wallace	304 (–222)
3	12	Christopher Bell	291 (–235)
	13	Ryan Preece	276 (–250)
	14	Daniel Suárez	271 (–255)
1	15	Austin Cindric	248 (–278)
1	16	Chase Briscoe	242 (–284)
Official driver's standings

Manufacturers' Championship standings

Pos	Manufacturer	Points
1	Toyota	513
2	Chevrolet	440 (–73)
3	Ford	381 (–132)

- Note: Only the first 16 positions are included for the driver standings.

Previous race: 2026 Jack Link's 500	NASCAR Cup Series; 2026 season	Next race: 2026 Go Bowling at The Glen
