= 2026 Pennzoil 400 =

NASCAR Cup Series race

2026 Pennzoil 400 presented by Jiffy Lube
Race details
- Race 5 of 36 in the 2026 NASCAR Cup Series
- Date: March 15, 2026
- Location: Las Vegas Motor Speedway in Las Vegas
- Course: Permanent racing facility
- Course length: 1.5 miles (2.4 km)
- Distance: 267 laps, 400.5 mi (640.8 km)
- Weather: Clear 81 °F (27 °C)
- Average speed: 148.992 miles per hour (239.779 km/h)

Pole position
Driver	Christopher Bell	Joe Gibbs Racing
- Time: 28.853

Most laps led
Driver	Denny Hamlin	Joe Gibbs Racing
- Laps: 134

Fastest lap
Driver	Denny Hamlin	Joe Gibbs Racing
- Time: 29.454

Winner
No. 11	Denny Hamlin	Joe Gibbs Racing

Television in the United States
- Network: FS1
- Announcers: Mike Joy, Clint Bowyer, and Kevin Harvick
- Nielsen ratings: 1.44 (2.771 million)

Radio in the United States
- Radio: PRN
- Booth announcers: Brad Gillie and Nick Yeoman
- Turn announcers: Andrew Kurland (1 & 2) and Pat Patterson (3 & 4)

The 2026 Pennzoil 400 was a NASCAR Cup Series race held on March 15, 2026, at Las Vegas Motor Speedway in North Las Vegas, Nevada. Contested over 267 laps on the 1.5 mi (2.4 km) asphalt intermediate speedway, it was the fifth race of the 2026 NASCAR Cup Series season.

Denny Hamlin won the race, his 61st career win, moving him to 10th all time on the all-time NASCAR Cup Series winners. Chase Elliott finished 2nd, and William Byron finished 3rd. Christopher Bell and Ty Gibbs rounded out the top five, and Chris Buescher, Kyle Larson, Chase Briscoe, Bubba Wallace, and Brad Keselowski rounded out the top ten.

== Report ==
=== Background ===
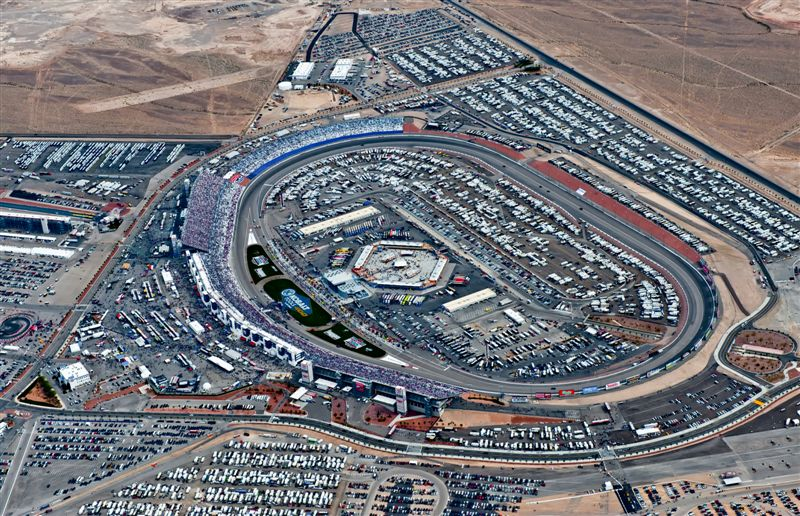
Las Vegas Motor Speedway, the track where the race was held.

Las Vegas Motor Speedway, located in Clark County, Nevada outside the Las Vegas city limits and about 15 miles northeast of the Las Vegas Strip, is a 1,200-acre (490 ha) complex of multiple tracks for motorsports racing. The complex is owned by Speedway Motorsports, Inc., which is headquartered in Charlotte, North Carolina.

==== Entry list ====
- (R) denotes rookie driver.
- (i) denotes driver who is ineligible for series driver points.

No.	Driver	Team	Manufacturer
1	Ross Chastain	Trackhouse Racing	Chevrolet
2	Austin Cindric	Team Penske	Ford
3	Austin Dillon	Richard Childress Racing	Chevrolet
4	Noah Gragson	Front Row Motorsports	Ford
5	Kyle Larson	Hendrick Motorsports	Chevrolet
6	Brad Keselowski	RFK Racing	Ford
7	Daniel Suárez	Spire Motorsports	Chevrolet
8	Kyle Busch	Richard Childress Racing	Chevrolet
9	Chase Elliott	Hendrick Motorsports	Chevrolet
10	Ty Dillon	Kaulig Racing	Chevrolet
11	Denny Hamlin	Joe Gibbs Racing	Toyota
12	Ryan Blaney	Team Penske	Ford
16	A. J. Allmendinger	Kaulig Racing	Chevrolet
17	Chris Buescher	RFK Racing	Ford
19	Chase Briscoe	Joe Gibbs Racing	Toyota
20	Christopher Bell	Joe Gibbs Racing	Toyota
21	Josh Berry	Wood Brothers Racing	Ford
22	Joey Logano	Team Penske	Ford
23	Bubba Wallace	23XI Racing	Toyota
24	William Byron	Hendrick Motorsports	Chevrolet
34	Todd Gilliland	Front Row Motorsports	Ford
35	Riley Herbst	23XI Racing	Toyota
38	Zane Smith	Front Row Motorsports	Ford
41	Cole Custer	Haas Factory Team	Chevrolet
42	John Hunter Nemechek	Legacy Motor Club	Toyota
43	Erik Jones	Legacy Motor Club	Toyota
45	Tyler Reddick	23XI Racing	Toyota
47	Ricky Stenhouse Jr.	Hyak Motorsports	Chevrolet
48	Justin Allgaier (i)	Hendrick Motorsports	Chevrolet
51	Cody Ware	Rick Ware Racing	Chevrolet
54	Ty Gibbs	Joe Gibbs Racing	Toyota
60	Ryan Preece	RFK Racing	Ford
71	Michael McDowell	Spire Motorsports	Chevrolet
77	Carson Hocevar	Spire Motorsports	Chevrolet
88	Connor Zilisch (R)	Trackhouse Racing	Chevrolet
97	Shane van Gisbergen	Trackhouse Racing	Chevrolet
Official entry list

Alex Bowman, the original driver of the No. 48, was sidelined for the race due to vertigo sustained at Austin.

== Practice ==
Christopher Bell was the fastest in the practice session with a time of 29.338 seconds and a speed of 184.062 mph (296.219 km/h).

=== Practice results ===
Pos	No.	Driver	Team	Manufacturer	Time	Speed
1	20	Christopher Bell	Joe Gibbs Racing	Toyota	29.338	184.062
2	11	Denny Hamlin	Joe Gibbs Racing	Toyota	29.438	183.436
3	47	Ricky Stenhouse Jr.	Hyak Motorsports	Chevrolet	29.460	183.299
Official practice results

== Qualifying ==
Christopher Bell scored the pole for the race with a time of 28.853 and a speed of 187.156 mph (301.198 km/h).

=== Qualifying results ===
Pos	No.	Driver	Team	Manufacturer	Time	Speed
1	20	Christopher Bell	Joe Gibbs Racing	Toyota	28.853	187.156
2	11	Denny Hamlin	Joe Gibbs Racing	Toyota	29.003	186.188
3	54	Ty Gibbs	Joe Gibbs Racing	Toyota	29.063	185.803
4	23	Bubba Wallace	23XI Racing	Toyota	29.068	185.771
5	5	Kyle Larson	Hendrick Motorsports	Chevrolet	29.103	185.548
6	12	Ryan Blaney	Team Penske	Ford	29.160	185.185
7	45	Tyler Reddick	23XI Racing	Toyota	29.168	185.134
8	60	Ryan Preece	RFK Racing	Ford	29.205	184.900
9	24	William Byron	Hendrick Motorsports	Chevrolet	29.217	184.824
10	17	Chris Buescher	RFK Racing	Ford	29.245	184.647
11	3	Austin Dillon	Richard Childress Racing	Chevrolet	29.250	184.615
12	38	Zane Smith	Front Row Motorsports	Ford	29.252	184.603
13	7	Daniel Suárez	Spire Motorsports	Chevrolet	29.279	184.433
14	43	Erik Jones	Legacy Motor Club	Toyota	29.285	184.395
15	9	Chase Elliott	Hendrick Motorsports	Chevrolet	29.289	184.370
16	97	Shane van Gisbergen	Trackhouse Racing	Chevrolet	29.294	184.338
17	1	Ross Chastain	Trackhouse Racing	Chevrolet	29.338	184.062
18	19	Chase Briscoe	Joe Gibbs Racing	Toyota	29.343	184.030
19	77	Carson Hocevar	Spire Motorsports	Chevrolet	29.356	183.949
20	35	Riley Herbst	23XI Racing	Toyota	29.363	183.905
21	22	Joey Logano	Team Penske	Ford	29.376	183.824
22	48	Justin Allgaier (i)	Hendrick Motorsports	Chevrolet	29.376	183.824
23	47	Ricky Stenhouse Jr.	Hyak Motorsports	Chevrolet	29.387	183.755
24	8	Kyle Busch	Richard Childress Racing	Chevrolet	29.455	183.331
25	88	Connor Zilisch (R)	Trackhouse Racing	Chevrolet	29.478	183.187
26	42	John Hunter Nemechek	Legacy Motor Club	Toyota	29.493	183.094
27	34	Todd Gilliland	Front Row Motorsports	Ford	29.493	183.094
28	6	Brad Keselowski	RFK Racing	Ford	29.504	183.026
29	16	A. J. Allmendinger	Kaulig Racing	Chevrolet	29.530	182.865
30	71	Michael McDowell	Spire Motorsports	Chevrolet	29.652	182.113
31	2	Austin Cindric	Team Penske	Ford	29.690	181.879
32	21	Josh Berry	Wood Brothers Racing	Ford	29.745	181.543
33	51	Cody Ware	Rick Ware Racing	Chevrolet	29.770	181.391
34	4	Noah Gragson	Front Row Motorsports	Ford	30.059	179.647
35	41	Cole Custer	Haas Factory Team	Chevrolet	30.250	178.512
36	10	Ty Dillon	Kaulig Racing	Chevrolet	30.607	176.430
Official qualifying results

== Race ==
=== Race results ===
==== Stage Results ====
Stage One Laps: 80

Pos	No	Driver	Team	Manufacturer	Points
1	20	Christopher Bell	Joe Gibbs Racing	Toyota	10
2	5	Kyle Larson	Hendrick Motorsports	Chevrolet	9
3	11	Denny Hamlin	Joe Gibbs Racing	Toyota	8
4	54	Ty Gibbs	Joe Gibbs Racing	Toyota	7
5	23	Bubba Wallace	23XI Racing	Toyota	6
6	24	William Byron	Hendrick Motorsports	Chevrolet	5
7	60	Ryan Preece	RFK Racing	Ford	4
8	9	Chase Elliott	Hendrick Motorsports	Chevrolet	3
9	12	Ryan Blaney	Team Penske	Ford	2
10	45	Tyler Reddick	23XI Racing	Toyota	1

Stage Two Laps: 85

Pos	No	Driver	Team	Manufacturer	Points
1	24	William Byron	Hendrick Motorsports	Chevrolet	10
2	5	Kyle Larson	Hendrick Motorsports	Chevrolet	9
3	20	Christopher Bell	Joe Gibbs Racing	Toyota	8
4	23	Bubba Wallace	23XI Racing	Toyota	7
5	11	Denny Hamlin	Joe Gibbs Racing	Toyota	6
6	45	Tyler Reddick	23XI Racing	Toyota	5
7	17	Chris Buescher	RFK Racing	Ford	4
8	60	Ryan Preece	RFK Racing	Ford	3
9	9	Chase Elliott	Hendrick Motorsports	Chevrolet	2
10	2	Austin Cindric	Team Penske	Ford	1

=== Final Stage Results ===
Stage Three Laps: 102

Pos	Grid	No	Driver	Team	Manufacturer	Laps	Points
1	2	11	Denny Hamlin	Joe Gibbs Racing	Toyota	267	70
2	15	9	Chase Elliott	Hendrick Motorsports	Chevrolet	267	40
3	9	24	William Byron	Hendrick Motorsports	Chevrolet	267	49
4	1	20	Christopher Bell	Joe Gibbs Racing	Toyota	267	51
5	3	54	Ty Gibbs	Joe Gibbs Racing	Toyota	267	39
6	10	17	Chris Buescher	RFK Racing	Ford	267	35
7	5	5	Kyle Larson	Hendrick Motorsports	Chevrolet	267	48
8	18	19	Chase Briscoe	Joe Gibbs Racing	Toyota	267	29
9	4	23	Bubba Wallace	23XI Racing	Toyota	267	41
10	28	6	Brad Keselowski	RFK Racing	Ford	267	27
11	8	60	Ryan Preece	RFK Racing	Ford	267	33
12	11	3	Austin Dillon	Richard Childress Racing	Chevrolet	267	25
13	7	45	Tyler Reddick	23XI Racing	Toyota	267	30
14	12	38	Zane Smith	Front Row Motorsports	Ford	267	23
15	21	22	Joey Logano	Team Penske	Ford	267	22
16	6	12	Ryan Blaney	Team Penske	Ford	267	23
17	17	1	Ross Chastain	Trackhouse Racing	Chevrolet	267	20
18	13	7	Daniel Suárez	Spire Motorsports	Chevrolet	267	19
19	31	2	Austin Cindric	Team Penske	Ford	267	19
20	14	43	Erik Jones	Legacy Motor Club	Toyota	267	17
21	26	42	John Hunter Nemechek	Legacy Motor Club	Toyota	266	16
22	19	77	Carson Hocevar	Spire Motorsports	Chevrolet	266	15
23	20	35	Riley Herbst	23XI Racing	Toyota	266	14
24	29	16	A. J. Allmendinger	Kaulig Racing	Chevrolet	265	13
25	22	48	Justin Allgaier (i)	Hendrick Motorsports	Chevrolet	265	0
26	30	71	Michael McDowell	Spire Motorsports	Chevrolet	265	11
27	35	41	Cole Custer	Haas Factory Team	Chevrolet	265	10
28	24	8	Kyle Busch	Richard Childress Racing	Chevrolet	265	9
29	23	47	Ricky Stenhouse Jr.	Hyak Motorsports	Chevrolet	265	8
30	34	4	Noah Gragson	Front Row Motorsports	Ford	265	7
31	32	21	Josh Berry	Wood Brothers Racing	Ford	264	6
32	25	88	Connor Zilisch (R)	Trackhouse Racing	Chevrolet	264	5
33	36	10	Ty Dillon	Kaulig Racing	Chevrolet	264	4
34	27	34	Todd Gilliland	Front Row Motorsports	Ford	264	3
35	33	51	Cody Ware	Rick Ware Racing	Chevrolet	263	2
36	16	97	Shane van Gisbergen	Trackhouse Racing	Chevrolet	262	1
Official race results

=== Race statistics ===
- Lead changes: 21 among 9 different drivers
- Cautions/Laps: 3 for 20 laps
- Red flags: 0
- Time of race: 2 hours, 41 minutes and 17 seconds
- Average speed: 148.992 miles per hour (239.779 km/h)

== Media ==
=== Television ===
Fox Sports was carried by FS1 in the United States. Mike Joy, Clint Bowyer, and two-time Las Vegas winner Kevin Harvick called the race from the broadcast booth. Jamie Little and Regan Smith handled pit road for the television side, and Larry McReynolds provided insight on-site during the race.

FS1
Booth announcers	Pit reporters	In-race analyst
Lap-by-lap: Mike Joy; Color-commentator: Clint Bowyer; Color-commentator: Kevin Harvick	Jamie Little; Regan Smith	Larry McReynolds

=== Radio ===
PRN covered the radio call for the race which was also simulcasted on Sirius XM NASCAR Radio. Brad Gillie and Nick Yeoman called the race in the booth when the field races through the tri-oval. Andrew Kurland called the race from a billboard in turn 2 when the field races through turns 1 and 2. Pat Patterson called the race from a billboard outside of turn 3 when the field races through turns 3 and 4. Wendy Venturini, Alan Cavanna, and Heather DeBeaux worked pit road for the radio side.

PRN
Booth announcers	Turn announcers	Pit reporters
Lead announcer: Brad Gillie; Announcer: Nick Yeoman	Turns 1 & 2: Andrew Kurland; Turns 3 & 4: Pat Patterson	Wendy Venturini; Alan Cavanna; Heather DeBeaux

== Standings after the race ==
Drivers' Championship standings

	Pos	Driver	Points
	1	Tyler Reddick	255
1	2	Bubba Wallace	194 (–61)
1	3	Ryan Blaney	188 (–67)
8	4	Denny Hamlin	177 (–78)
1	5	Chase Elliott	168 (–87)
	6	Christopher Bell	164 (–91)
3	7	Kyle Larson	157 (–98)
3	8	William Byron	157 (–98)
	9	Chris Buescher	146 (–109)
5	10	Ty Gibbs	140 (–115)
4	11	Joey Logano	135 (–120)
4	12	Brad Keselowski	127 (–128)
5	13	Ryan Preece	125 (–130)
6	14	Michael McDowell	122 (–133)
1	15	Carson Hocevar	118 (–137)
11	16	Shane van Gisbergen	117 (–138)
Official driver's standings

Manufacturers' Championship standings

Pos	Manufacturer	Points
1	Toyota	255
2	Ford	179 (–76)
3	Chevrolet	173 (–82)

- Note: Only the first 16 positions are included for the driver standings.

Previous race: 2026 Straight Talk Wireless 500	NASCAR Cup Series; 2026 season	Next race: 2026 Goodyear 400
