= 2026 America 250 Florida Duel at Daytona =

NASCAR Duels at Daytona International Speedway in 2026

Race details
- Date: February 12, 2026
- Location: Daytona International Speedway; Daytona Beach, Florida
- Course: Permanent racing facility 2.5 mi (4 km)
- Distance: Race 1: 63 laps, 157.5 mi (252 km); Race 2: 60 laps, 150 mi (240 km)
- Avg Speed: Race 1: 153.867 miles per hour (247.625 km/h); Race 2: 183.237 miles per hour (294.891 km/h)

Race 1
- Pole position: Kyle Busch
- Most laps led: Ryan Preece (38)
- Winner: Joey Logano

Race 2
- Pole position: Chase Briscoe
- Most laps led: Chase Briscoe (39)
- Winner: Chase Elliott

Television
- Network: FS1 & MRN
- Announcers: Mike Joy, Clint Bowyer, and Kevin Harvick (Television); Alex Hayden, Mike Bagley, and Rusty Wallace (Booth); Dave Moody (1 & 2), Kyle Rickey (Backstretch), and Tim Catalfamo (3 & 4) (Turns) (Radio)

The 2026 America 250 Florida Duel at Daytona were a pair of NASCAR Cup Series stock car races that was held on February 12, 2026, at Daytona International Speedway in Daytona Beach, Florida. Both scheduled to be contested over 60 laps, they were the qualifying races for the 2026 Daytona 500. The first duel went beyond the scheduled distance, as it was extended to 63 laps due to overtime.

== Report ==
=== Background ===
Daytona International Speedway, where the races were held.

Daytona International Speedway is one of three superspeedways to hold NASCAR races, the other two being Atlanta Motor Speedway and Talladega Superspeedway. The standard track at Daytona International Speedway is a four-turn superspeedway that is 2.5 miles (4.0 km) long. The track's turns are banked at 31 degrees, while the front stretch, the location of the finish line, is banked at 18 degrees.

In December 2025, the track revealed in their brochure for the Daytona 500 race weekend that the Duel races would have a new name in 2026, the America 250 Florida Duel at Daytona. America 250 Florida is the campaign of the Florida Commission for the United States Semiquincentennial, a committee established by an executive order from Governor of Florida Ron DeSantis to plan events in celebration of the 250th Anniversary of the United States in the state of Florida.

== Qualifying ==
Kyle Busch scored the pole for the race with a time of 49.006 and a speed of 183.651 mph (295.558 km/h).

=== Qualifying results ===
Pos	No.	Driver	Team	Manufacturer	R1	R2
1	8	Kyle Busch	Richard Childress Racing	Chevrolet	48.933	49.006
2	19	Chase Briscoe	Joe Gibbs Racing	Toyota	49.034	49.022
3	60	Ryan Preece	RFK Racing	Ford	49.081	49.061
4	11	Denny Hamlin	Joe Gibbs Racing	Toyota	49.105	49.100
5	67	Corey Heim (i)	23XI Racing	Toyota	49.138	49.147
6	48	Alex Bowman	Hendrick Motorsports	Chevrolet	49.117	49.152
7	5	Kyle Larson	Hendrick Motorsports	Chevrolet	49.121	49.158
8	17	Chris Buescher	RFK Racing	Ford	49.168	49.184
9	9	Chase Elliott	Hendrick Motorsports	Chevrolet	49.170	49.220
10	22	Joey Logano	Team Penske	Ford	49.172	49.275
11	54	Ty Gibbs	Joe Gibbs Racing	Toyota	49.184	—
12	3	Austin Dillon	Richard Childress Racing	Chevrolet	49.185	—
13	20	Christopher Bell	Joe Gibbs Racing	Toyota	49.197	—
14	40	Justin Allgaier (i)	JR Motorsports	Chevrolet	49.201	—
15	99	Corey LaJoie	RFK Racing	Ford	49.205	—
16	42	John Hunter Nemechek	Legacy Motor Club	Toyota	49.214	—
17	2	Austin Cindric	Team Penske	Ford	49.248	—
18	6	Brad Keselowski	RFK Racing	Ford	49.252	—
19	38	Zane Smith	Front Row Motorsports	Ford	49.266	—
20	12	Ryan Blaney	Team Penske	Ford	49.269	—
21	71	Michael McDowell	Spire Motorsports	Chevrolet	49.280	—
22	24	William Byron	Hendrick Motorsports	Chevrolet	49.282	—
23	88	Connor Zilisch (R)	Trackhouse Racing	Chevrolet	49.291	—
24	41	Cole Custer	Haas Factory Team	Chevrolet	49.322	—
25	43	Erik Jones	Legacy Motor Club	Toyota	49.332	—
26	51	Cody Ware	Rick Ware Racing	Chevrolet	49.350	—
27	21	Josh Berry	Wood Brothers Racing	Ford	49.354	—
28	84	Jimmie Johnson	Legacy Motor Club	Toyota	49.366	—
29	77	Carson Hocevar	Spire Motorsports	Chevrolet	49.427	—
30	23	Bubba Wallace	23XI Racing	Toyota	49.432	—
31	35	Riley Herbst	23XI Racing	Toyota	49.452	—
32	16	A. J. Allmendinger	Kaulig Racing	Chevrolet	49.460	—
33	34	Todd Gilliland	Front Row Motorsports	Ford	49.460	—
34	1	Ross Chastain	Trackhouse Racing	Chevrolet	49.483	—
35	62	Anthony Alfredo (i)	Beard Motorsports	Chevrolet	49.485	—
36	10	Ty Dillon	Kaulig Racing	Chevrolet	49.497	—
37	97	Shane van Gisbergen	Trackhouse Racing	Chevrolet	49.527	—
38	47	Ricky Stenhouse Jr.	Hyak Motorsports	Chevrolet	49.529	—
39	7	Daniel Suárez	Trackhouse Racing	Chevrolet	49.552	—
40	45	Tyler Reddick	23XI Racing	Toyota	49.609	—
41	36	Chandler Smith (i)	Front Row Motorsports	Ford	49.758	—
42	78	B. J. McLeod	Live Fast Motorsports	Chevrolet	50.011	—
43	66	Casey Mears	Garage 66	Ford	50.233	—
44	44	J. J. Yeley (i)	NY Racing Team	Chevrolet	50.482	—
45	4	Noah Gragson	Front Row Motorsports	Ford	0.000	—
Official qualifying results

== Duels ==
=== Duel 1 ===
In Duel 1, Corey LaJoie was in position to make the race until he was caught up in a last-lap crash. Casey Mears would escape the worst of the wreck to finish 7th and race his way into the field. Corey Heim advanced as the fastest open car in time trial qualifying, while Jimmie Johnson advanced as an Open Excemption Provisional (OEP) competitor.

==== Duel 1 results ====
Pos	Grid	No	Driver	Team	Manufacturer	Laps	Points
1	6	22	Joey Logano	Team Penske	Ford	63	10
2	11	12	Ryan Blaney	Team Penske	Ford	63	9
3	7	3	Austin Dillon	Richard Childress Racing	Chevrolet	63	8
4	9	42	John Hunter Nemechek	Legacy Motor Club	Toyota	63	7
5	10	6	Brad Keselowski	RFK Racing	Ford	63	6
6	19	97	Shane van Gisbergen	Trackhouse Racing	Chevrolet	63	5
7	22	66	Casey Mears	Garage 66	Ford	63	4
8	20	7	Daniel Suárez	Spire Motorsports	Chevrolet	63	3
9	2	60	Ryan Preece	RFK Racing	Ford	63	2
10	4	48	Alex Bowman	Hendrick Motorsports	Chevrolet	63	1
11	13	41	Cole Custer	Haas Factory Team	Chevrolet	63	0
12	23	4	Noah Gragson	Front Row Motorsports	Ford	63	0
13	16	23	Bubba Wallace	23XI Racing	Toyota	63	0
14	3	67	Corey Heim (i)	23XI Racing	Toyota	63	0
15	15	84	Jimmie Johnson	Legacy Motor Club	Toyota	63	0
16	21	36	Chandler Smith (i)	Front Row Motorsports	Ford	63	0
17	14	51	Cody Ware	Rick Ware Racing	Ford	63	0
18	1	8	Kyle Busch	Richard Childress Racing	Chevrolet	63	0
19	8	99	Corey LaJoie	RFK Racing	Ford	62	0
20	17	16	A. J. Allmendinger	Kaulig Racing	Chevrolet	62	0
21	18	1	Ross Chastain	Trackhouse Racing	Chevrolet	62	0
22	12	24	William Byron	Hendrick Motorsports	Chevrolet	55	0
23	5	17	Chris Buescher	RFK Racing	Ford	55	0
Official race results

=== Duel 2 ===
Anthony Alfredo initially raced his way in as the highest finishing open car, but failed post-race inspection and was disqualified. As a result, B.J. McLeod would make the race instead, with Justin Allgaier also advancing as the second-fastest open car during time trial qualifying.

==== Duel 2 results ====
Pos	Grid	No	Driver	Team	Manufacturer	Laps	Points
1	4	9	Chase Elliott	Hendrick Motorsports	Chevrolet	60	10
2	14	77	Carson Hocevar	Spire Motorsports	Chevrolet	60	9
3	3	5	Kyle Larson	Hendrick Motorsports	Chevrolet	60	8
4	10	71	Michael McDowell	Spire Motorsports	Chevrolet	60	7
5	6	20	Christopher Bell	Joe Gibbs Racing	Toyota	60	6
6	13	21	Josh Berry	Wood Brothers Racing	Ford	60	5
7	19	47	Ricky Stenhouse Jr.	Hyak Motorsports	Chevrolet	60	4
8	16	34	Todd Gilliland	Front Row Motorsports	Ford	60	3
9	5	54	Ty Gibbs	Joe Gibbs Racing	Toyota	60	2
10	2	11	Denny Hamlin	Joe Gibbs Racing	Toyota	60	1
11	12	43	Erik Jones	Legacy Motor Club	Toyota	60	0
12	20	45	Tyler Reddick	23XI Racing	Toyota	60	0
13	15	35	Riley Herbst	23XI Racing	Toyota	60	0
14	9	38	Zane Smith	Front Row Motorsports	Ford	60	0
15	11	88	Connor Zilisch (R)	Trackhouse Racing	Chevrolet	60	0
16	18	10	Ty Dillon	Kaulig Racing	Chevrolet	60	0
17	8	2	Austin Cindric	Team Penske	Ford	60	0
18	21	78	B. J. McLeod	Live Fast Motorsports	Chevrolet	60	0
19	1	19	Chase Briscoe	Joe Gibbs Racing	Toyota	60	0
20	7	40	Justin Allgaier (i)	JR Motorsports	Chevrolet	60	0
21	22	44	J. J. Yeley (i)	NY Racing Team	Chevrolet	57	0
DSQ	17	62	Anthony Alfredo (i)	Beard Motorsports	Chevrolet	60	0
Official race results

== Media ==
=== Television ===
FS1
Booth announcers	Pit reporters	In-race analyst
Lap-by-lap: Mike Joy; Color-commentator: Clint Bowyer; Color-commentator: Kevin Harvick	Jamie Little; Regan Smith	Larry McReynolds

=== Radio ===
MRN Radio
Booth announcers	Turn announcers	Pit reporters
Lead announcer: Alex Hayden; Announcer: Mike Bagley; Announcer: Rusty Wallace	Turns 1 & 2: Dave Moody; Backstretch: Kyle Rickey; Turns 3 & 4: Tim Catalfamo	Steve Post; Chris Wilner; Brad Gillie

Previous race: 2026 Cook Out Clash (exhibition)	NASCAR Cup Series; 2026 season	Next race: 2026 Daytona 500 (points)
