= January 30 – February 2, 2026 nor'easter =

2026 weather event in North America

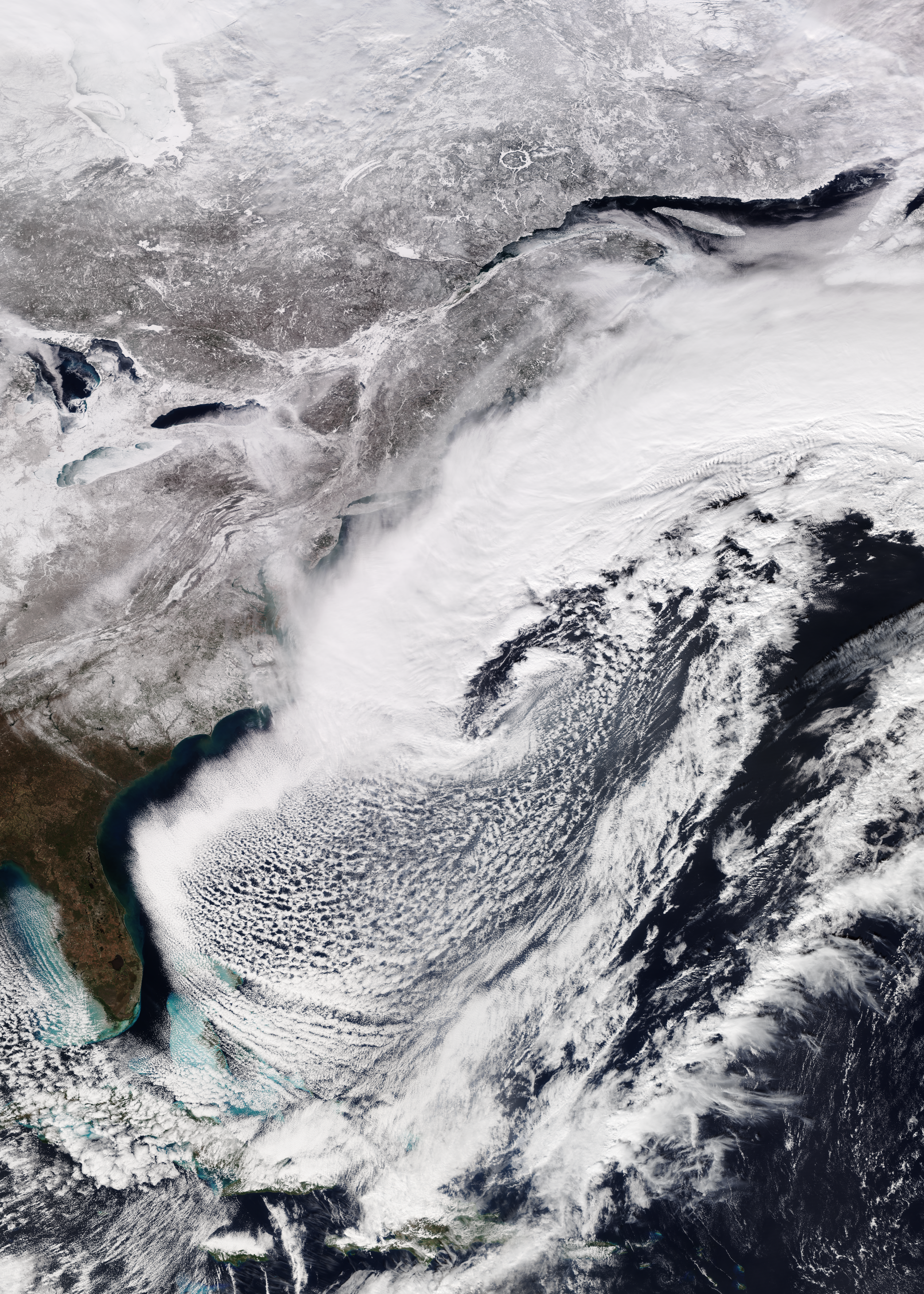
- The winter storm rapidly strengthening off the East Coast of the United States on February 1

Meteorological history
- Formed: January 30, 2026
- Exited land: February 2, 2026
- Dissipated: February 9, 2026

Category 2 "Minor" winter storm
- Regional snowfall index: 5.35 (NOAA)
- Highest gusts: 70 mph (110 km/h) at Jennettes Pier, North Carolina
- Lowest pressure: 964 mbar (hPa); 28.47 inHg
- Max. snowfall: 22.5 in (57 cm) in Faust, North Carolina

Overall effects
- Fatalities: 13 total
- Injuries: 44
- Damage: $550 million (2026 USD)
- Areas affected: Eastern United States, Eastern Canada, Bermuda, Caribbean
- Power outages: > 190,000
- Part of the 2025–26 North American winter

A powerful and unusual bomb cyclone and winter storm, unofficially referred to as Winter Storm Gianna by The Weather Channel and media outlets, brought heavy precipitation and gusty winds to the Southeastern United States and Virginia, mostly in the Carolinas from January 30 to February 1, 2026. It occurred just days after a previous winter storm caused severe impacts in some of the same regions. The storm was given an RSI number of 5.348, or a Category 2 "Minor" winter storm rating. Forming out of a shortwave trough that moved into the Southwestern Atlantic Ocean on January 30, the storm gradually organized over the following day, before moving northeastwards and rapidly strengthened late on January 31 into February 1. The cyclone brought heavy snowfall accumulations of 13–22.5 inches (33–57 cm) in the Carolinas, with the highest totals in western North Carolina. The storm was also the first storm to bring measurable snowfall in all 100 counties of North Carolina since a storm in 2014. Near-blizzard conditions and coastal flooding were also reported closest to the shore, damaging many properties. The storm went on to impact Canada with similar conditions on February 2, before it moved out to the east into the northern Atlantic Ocean, affecting the United Kingdom and dissipated on February 9.

North Carolina and Georgia declared states of emergencies while Virginia and South Carolina extended their states of emergencies from the previous storm. Snow began the night of January 30 in parts of the Southeast. By 11:30 a.m. on January 31, Maggie Valley, North Carolina, and Greeneville, Tennessee, both ended up with 9 in (23 cm) of snow. At least 13 people were killed as a result of the storm, and damage was estimated to be near US$550 million.

== Meteorological history ==
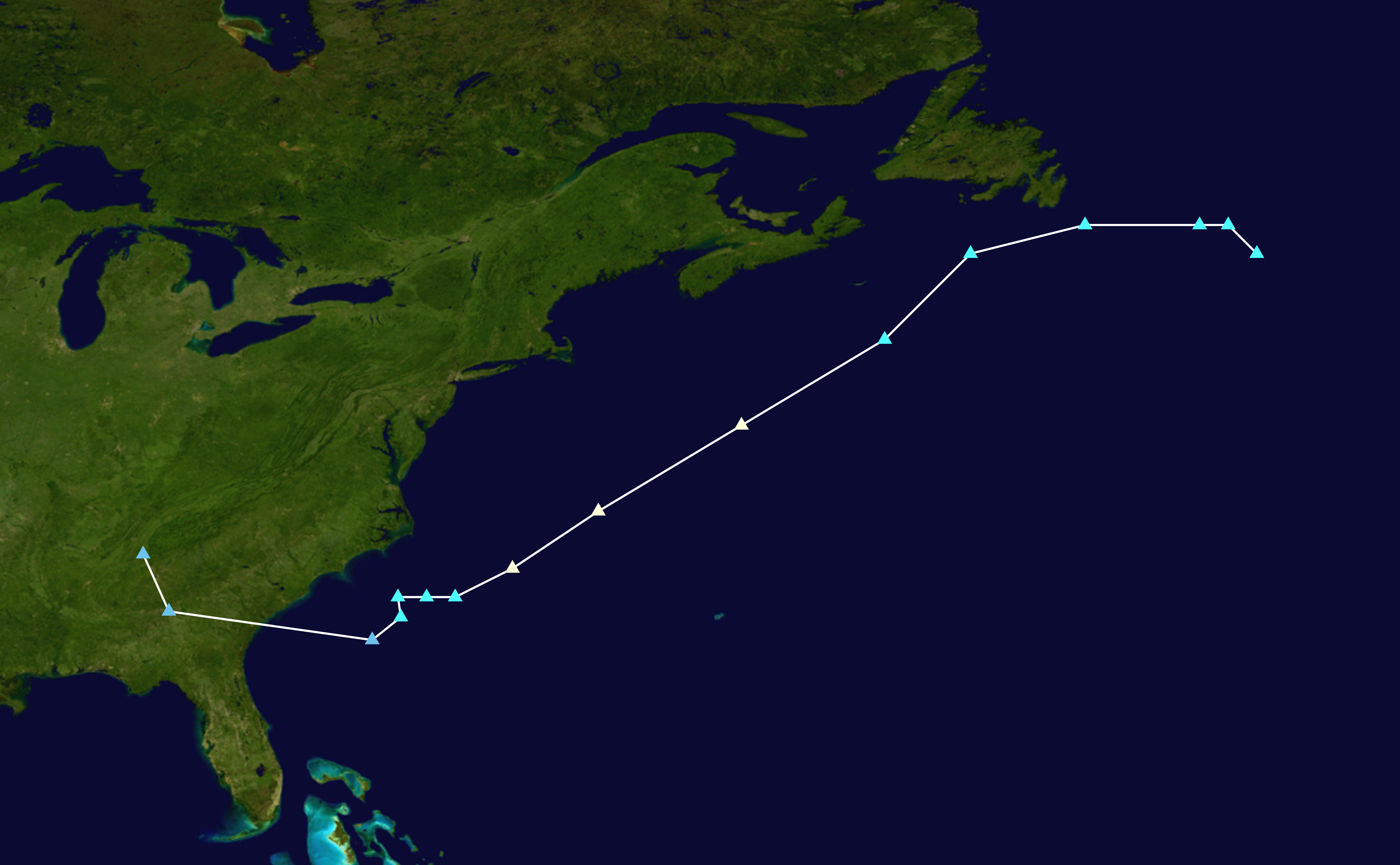
Map plotting the storm's track and intensity, according to the Saffir–Simpson scale Map key Saffir–Simpson scale Tropical depression (≤38 mph, ≤62 km/h) Tropical storm (39–73 mph, 63–118 km/h) Category 1 (74–95 mph, 119–153 km/h) Category 2 (96–110 mph, 154–177 km/h) Category 3 (111–129 mph, 178–208 km/h) Category 4 (130–156 mph, 209–251 km/h) Category 5 (≥157 mph, ≥252 km/h) Unknown Storm type Tropical cyclone Subtropical cyclone Extratropical cyclone, remnant low, tropical disturbance, or monsoon depression

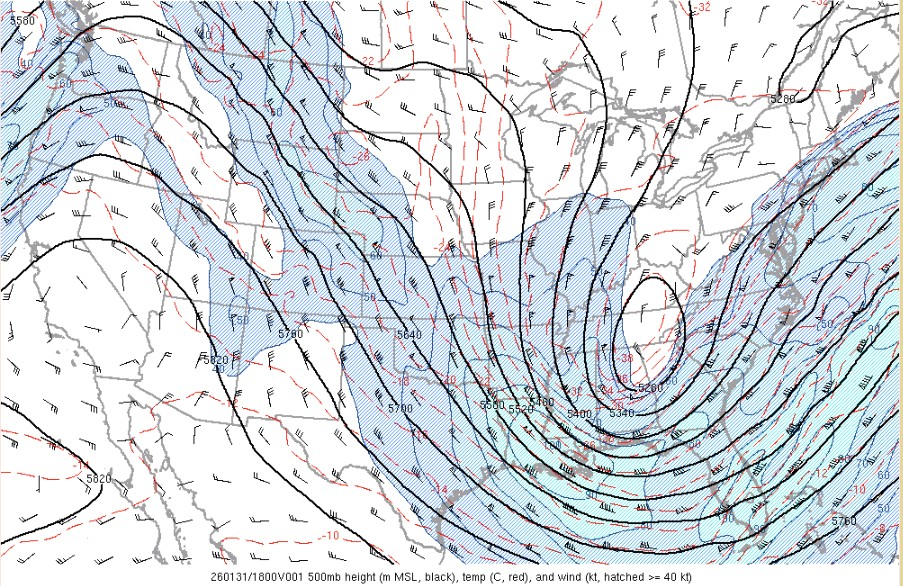
500 mb jet stream during the formation of the storm.

In late January 2026, a nor'easter was predicted by meteorologists to bring significant snowfall to the Southeastern United States starting around January 30. The storm initially began to form as an extratropical low-pressure area from a large trough and upper-level cyclone in the jet stream over the Southeastern United States on January 30. As the surface low developed, it and the upper-level cyclone began to pull moisture from the Gulf of Mexico northwards into the Southeastern United States. Snow began on the night of January 30 in parts of the Southeast due to strengthening of the upper-level low. The system began developing into a nor'easter offshore of the Carolinas and began strengthening around January 31. The Weather Prediction Center began issuing storm summaries for the system at 15:00 UTC. The intensity of the precipitation increased and peaked during late January 31 to early February 1 in the region, due to an inverted trough combined with upslope flow. Snow began to taper off in the Southeast as the storm began to move northeastwardly away from the United States East Coast on February 1, being carried by the jet stream. While this was happening, the storm underwent rapid strengthening in the northwestern Atlantic. The storm continued causing gusty winds for the East Coast. As the storm moved away from the East Coast, the Weather Prediction Center issued its last storm summary on February 2 at 3:00 UTC.

The system moved up offshore of Atlantic Canada on February 2, bringing heavy snow and strong winds to Newfoundland as well as winter weather to Nova Scotia. It attained a pressure of 964 millibars (28.5 inHg) by 18:00 UTC just offshore of the Avalon Peninsula.

== Preparations ==
=== United States ===
The Hurricane Hunters flew an Air Force Reconnaissance C-130J from Biloxi, Mississippi, into the storm to gather data on January 30. The storm was predicted by several weather models to bring heavy but localized snowfall to areas in the Southeast and Mid-Atlantic, mainly the Carolinas.

Georgia governor Brian Kemp declared a state of emergency on January 30 for all counties in Georgia. Virginia extended its state of emergency from the previous storm. South Carolina governor Henry McMaster extended the state of emergency declaration from the previous winter storm on January 29. On January 29, North Carolina governor Josh Stein declared a state of emergency. Parts of North Carolina Highway 12 on Ocracoke Island was closed on the morning of January 31 ahead of the storm.

=== Canada ===
Environment Canada issued a special weather statement for Nova Scotia on January 31. An orange weather alert was issued for Newfoundland by Environment Canada on January 31, as well as a yellow winter storm watch. By February 1, up to 50 cm (20 in) of snow was forecasted for some areas. The Avalon Peninsula, Burin Peninsula, Clarenville, and some areas of central Newfoundland were under orange winter storm warnings. Other areas of central Newfoundland were under yellow winter storm warnings and up to 30 cm (12 in) was expected. Saint Bonaventure's College in St. John's cancelled class for February 2.

=== Bermuda ===
The Bermuda Weather Service issued a gale warning for the evening of January 31, as the storm was expected to cause heavy precipitation and wind to the islands.

== Impacts ==
=== United States ===
Over 2,000 flights were cancelled by the afternoon of January 31 and several Amtrak trains were cancelled or delayed. There were just under 190,000 power outages across the southeast by 7:30 p.m. Snow flurries occurred in parts of Florida from ocean-effect snow. Light snow also occurred in Cape Cod, Massachusetts, as well as minor coastal flooding.

==== Southeast ====
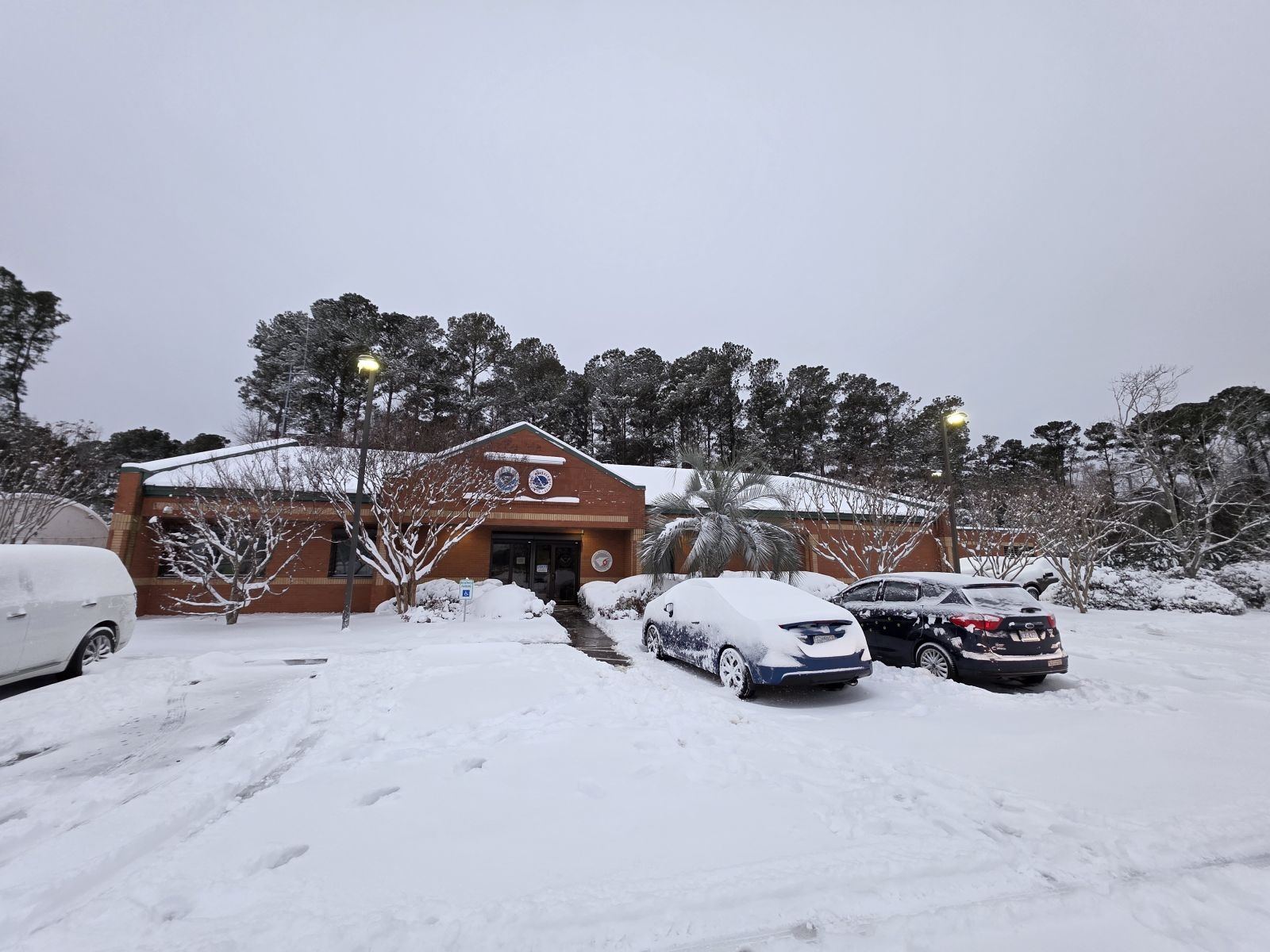
Snow at NWS Wilmington in North Carolina on February 1

Two crashes occurred in Gastonia, North Carolina, on the morning of January 31, with one weather-related and the cause of the other is undisclosed. Later that afternoon Access GSO suspended its services due to hazardous conditions. 750 crashes were reported by the North Carolina State Highway Patrol from 12 a.m. to 6 p.m. on January 31. A significant 100+ car pileup was reported on Interstate 85 near Kannapolis. A driver died after striking a motor grader as well as three other occupants received injuries on January 31 in Rutherford County. Another car collision killed one person in Robeson County. A 76-year-old man was killed in a side-by-side accident in Madison County. The North Carolina State Highway Patrol responded to 132 accidents between the midnight of January 31 and the morning of February 1. Of those crashes, 14 had injuries. Lexington received 16 in (41 cm) of snow. Widespread power outages occurred, with 2,000 outages in Henderson County by the morning of February 1.

Charlotte Douglas International Airport recorded 11 in (28 cm) of snow, tying with a December 1880 winter storm for the fourth-highest single-day snow total on January 31.

One person was killed in a sledding accident in Abbeville County, South Carolina, on January 31. Two people were killed in car accidents. One person died from hypothermia in Anderson County. A chunk of ice flew off of a car and hit the windshield of another, destroying it.

The storm delivered snowfall across parts of South Carolina, an unusual event given the typically mild winters in the state. Arctic air behind the system brought record-setting cold temperatures and dangerously low wind chills across the region. Roads were hazardous due to snow and ice, prompting advisories for residents to stay off roads unless travel was necessary. State authorities reported prioritizing major highway treatments and responding to hundreds of incidents (e.g., collisions, motorists needing assistance) between January 31 and February 1. ~3,000 Department of Transportation personnel for road treatment. Over 350 National Guard members and support vehicles for recovery and incident response efforts. 9 general population shelters opened across the state for residents unable to remain safely at home due to weather conditions.

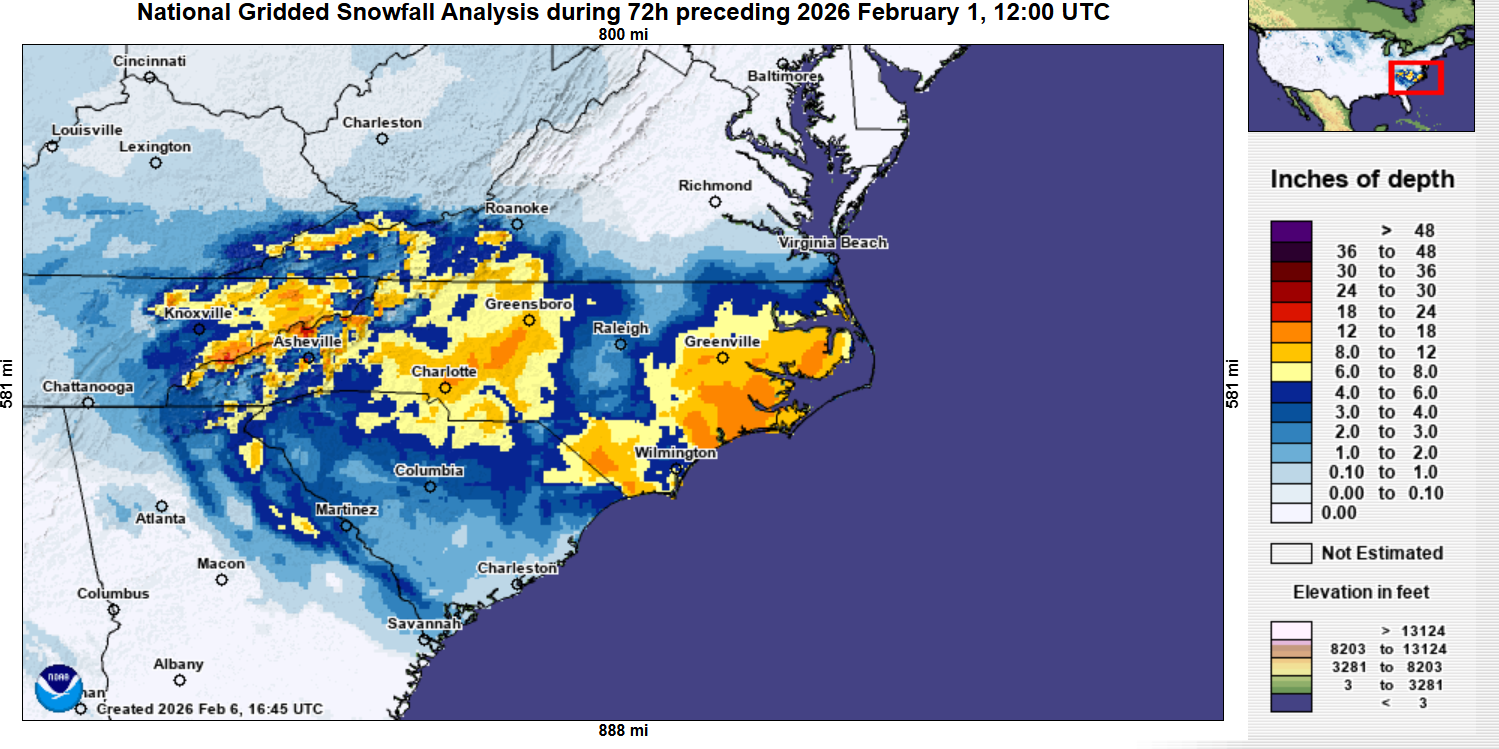
Snowfall analyses from for 72 hours preceding 12:00 UTC on February 1, 2026

Virginia State Police responded to 289 crashes between the morning of January 30 to 11 a.m. on February 1, with 29 injuries, though not all crashes were weather-related. Three fatal crashes occurred, one in Greensville County and another in Fauquier County, and the third was non-weather-related in Dinwiddie County.

Over 500 flights were cancelled at Atlanta by 10:45 a.m. on January 31. Many crashes occurred, with one crash on I-985 causing minor injuries. 11,569 people lost power in North Georgia by 8:45 p.m., 4,921 of which were in DeKalb County. The Tennessee Emergency Management Agency reported three deaths across East Tennessee. An indirect weather-related fatality was reported in Greene County on February 1. Sullivan and Washington counties each had one fatality.

The storm brought flurries as far south as South Florida, and the airmass that brought the flurries also brought record cold temperatures on February 1 to Miami and West Palm Beach.

=== Bermuda ===
2,298 BELCO customers lost power by 10 p.m. on January 31. Residents reported flooding in low-lying places due to heavy rain. All ferry services were cancelled by February 1.

=== Canada ===
Some schools and universities in Nova Scotia were closed on February 2. Public transit, municipal buildings, and recreational facilities ceased operations as well in the Cape Breton Regional Municipality. A snowplow struck a woman at 6:30 a.m. Turo, killing her. Small vehicles on the off-ramps of Highway 125 got stuck. The Groundhog Day event at Shubenacadie Wildlife Park was cancelled. Dover saw 11 in (27 cm) of snow while 5.9–7.9 in (15–20 cm) fell across Cape Breton. Halifax saw around 3.9 in (10 cm) of snow.

Schools were closed in eastern and central Newfoundland for February 2. Buses were kept off roads and municipal and all courts were closed in St. John's. The storm impacted the island on the morning of February 2 with winds gusting to 62 mph (100 km/h). This caused whiteout conditions and dangerous roads. Multiple vehicles were reported to be stuck by the Holyrood RCMP detachment prior to 10 a.m. Then a lull in the storm occurred right before noon. The metro region of St. John's saw roughly 12 in (30 cm) of snow by noon. About 8,000 customers on the Avalon Peninsula lost power. St. John's recorded 16–19 in (40–47 cm) of snow. The storm ended at around 2 a.m. on February 3. Trepassey declared a state of emergency on February 3 after debris and waves on a seaside road made it impossible to travel by car. Flights into the morning of February 3 were cancelled at St. John's International Airport.

=== Caribbean ===
The cold front resulted in gusts of 40–50 mph (64–80 km/h) in Cuba on January 31. The winds led to flooding in the waterfront of Havana as well as the northern and western regions of Cuba on February 1. Strong winds caused power outages to much of The Bahamas. Wind chills of 30–39 °F (−1–4 °C) prompted church leaders and volunteers gave out food, water, and blankets. The Cayman Islands suspended or restricted water sports and marine operations from January 31 to February 1 due to rough seas. Strong winds occurred in Jamaica.

In the wake of the storm, Cuba recorded its first-ever freeze, with a temperature of 0 degrees Celsius (32 degrees Fahrenheit) being recorded in Perico on the morning of February 3.

== See also ==
- January 2000 North American blizzard
- Weather of 2026
