= Carson Hocevar =

American racing driver (born 2003)

- Hocevar at Las Vegas Motor Speedway in 2026
- Born: Carson Scott Hocevar; January 28, 2003 (age 23); Portage, Michigan, U.S.
- Height: 6 ft 4 in (1.93 m)
- Weight: 160 lb (73 kg)
- Achievements: 2020 Winchester 400 Winner; 2020 Redbud 400 Winner; 2020, 2021, 2025 Money in the Bank 150 Winner; 2025, 2026 2.4 Hours of LeMullets Winner
- Awards: 2024 NASCAR Cup Series Rookie of the Year

NASCAR Cup Series career
- 116 races run over 4 years
- Car no., team: No. 77 (Spire Motorsports)
- 2026 position: 14th
- Best finish: 14th (2026)
- First race: 2023 Enjoy Illinois 300 (St. Louis)
- Last race: 2026 Xfinity 500 (Martinsville)
- First win: 2026 Jack Link's 500 (Talladega)
Wins	Top tens	Poles
1	27	3

NASCAR O'Reilly Auto Parts Series career
- 8 races run over 3 years
- 2026 position: 84th
- Best finish: 83rd (2023)
- First race: 2023 Pit Boss 250 (Austin)
- Last race: 2026 United Rentals 300 (Daytona)
Wins	Top tens	Poles
0	3	0

NASCAR FedEx Freight Truck Series career
- 91 races run over 7 years
- 2026 position: 94th
- Best finish: 3rd (2023)
- First race: 2019 Eldora Dirt Derby (Eldora)
- Last race: 2026 FaithFest 250 (North Wilkesboro)
- First win: 2023 SpeedyCash.com 250 (Texas)
- Last win: 2026 SpeedyCash.com 250 (Texas)
Wins	Top tens	Poles
6	38	1

ARCA Menards Series career
- 16 races run over 3 years
- Best finish: 12th (2019)
- First race: 2018 Toledo ARCA 200 (Toledo)
- Last race: 2021 Clean Harbors 100 at The Glen (Watkins Glen)
Wins	Top tens	Poles
0	13	2

ARCA Menards Series West career
- 1 race run over 1 year
- Best finish: 44th (2022)
- First race: 2022 Desert Diamond Casino West Valley 100 (Phoenix)
Wins	Top tens	Poles
0	0	0
- Statistics up to date as of November 8, 2026.

Carson Scott Hocevar (born January 28, 2003) is an American professional stock car racing driver. He competes full-time in the NASCAR Cup Series, driving the No. 77 Chevrolet Camaro ZL1 for Spire Motorsports. He has previously competed in the NASCAR O'Reilly Auto Parts Series, the NASCAR Craftsman Truck Series, and the ARCA Menards Series. He is a former member of the Drivers Edge Development driver development system.

== Racing career ==
=== Early career ===
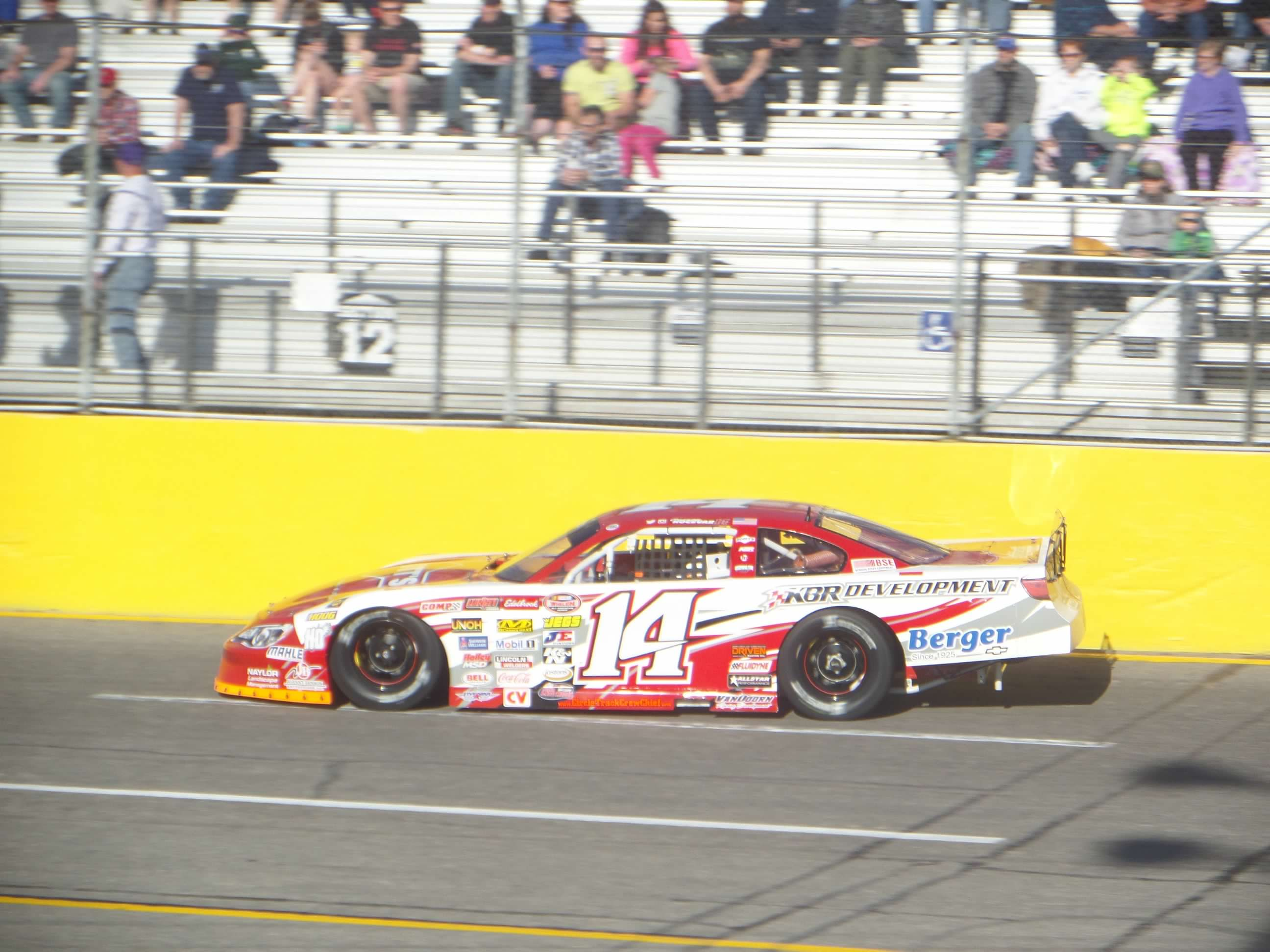
Hocevar racing at Berlin Raceway in 2017

Hocevar began competing in quarter midgets at the age of seven, winning 79 feature races and fifteen national championships. He started racing at Berlin Raceway in 2015 as a twelve year old and won the track's Outlaw Late Model championship. He won his first Super Late Model race at the track in 2016, but NASCAR stopped all drivers under fourteen from competing at sanctioned tracks. Hocevar returned in 2017 and won the track's Super Late Model championship.

=== ARCA Menards Series ===
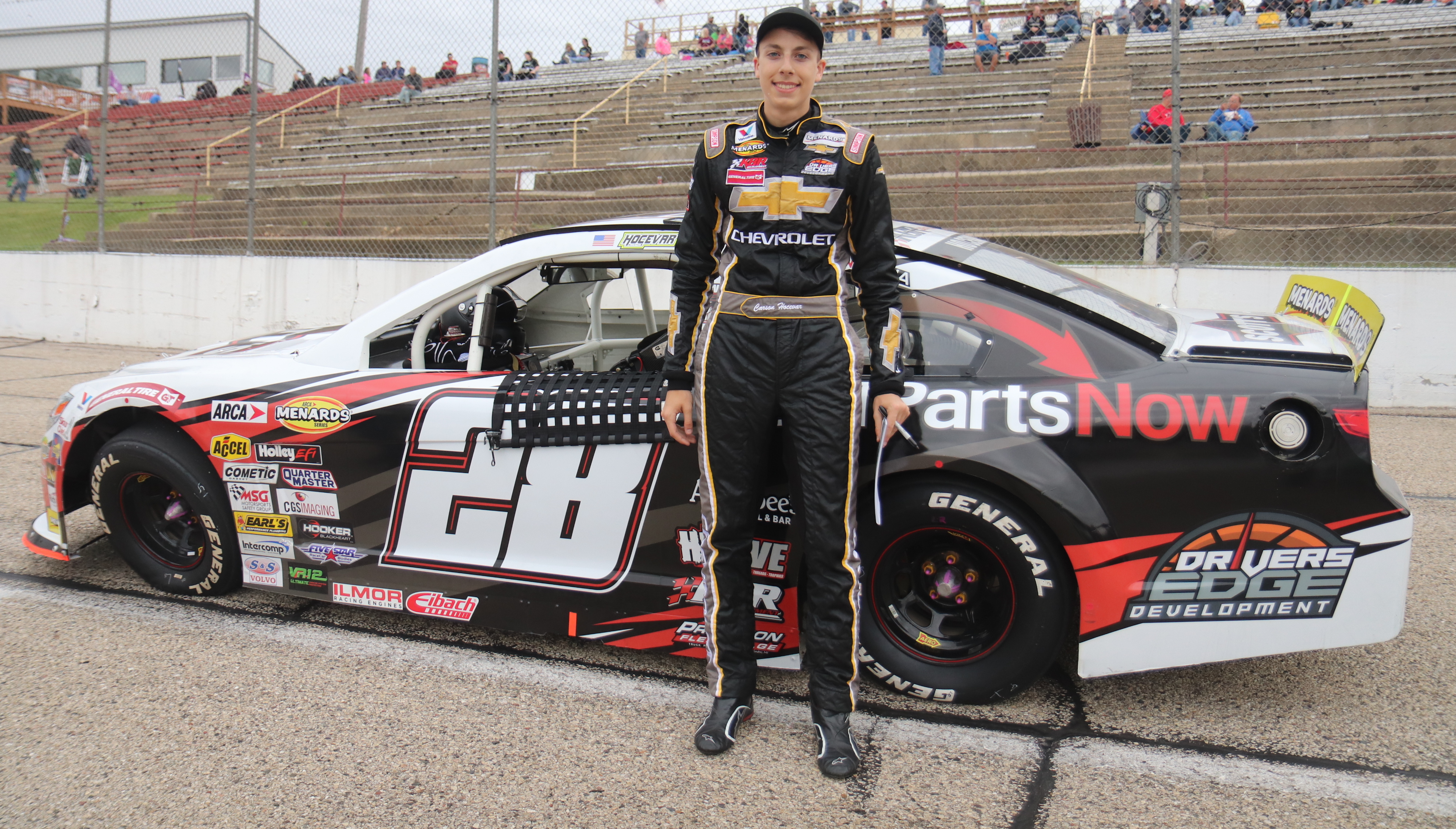
Hocevar standing next to his No. 28 car in 2019 before the race at Madison

Hocevar competed in eleven ARCA Menards Series races between 2018 and 2019, with nine top-ten finishes and two pole positions.

In 2019, Hocevar joined the Driver's Edge Development Program.

=== NASCAR Craftsman Truck Series ===
Hocevar made his NASCAR Gander Outdoors Truck Series debut in the 2019 Eldora Dirt Derby driving the No. 3 Chevrolet Silverado for Jordan Anderson Racing. He qualified for the main event by finishing third in the third qualifying race. He returned to the series in November at the Lucas Oil 150, driving a No. 56 for JAR in a partnership with Hill Motorsports.

On December 20, 2019, Hocevar joined Niece Motorsports for a nine-race schedule in 2020.

On September 24, 2020, Hocevar and Niece announced a full-season schedule in 2021. During the season, Hocevar would have a very successful rookie season, nearly winning multiple races. He finished second at Charlotte and fourth at Las Vegas. He re-signed with Niece in 2022.

On June 4, 2022, Hocevar broke his right tibia at the ankle during the final lap of the Gateway race when his truck was T-boned by Tyler Hill. He underwent surgery prior to the Sonoma race. Hocevar took the pole position before wrecking in turn 10. On lap eleven, he was relieved by Daniel Suárez, who took the No. 42 to a sixth-place finish.

Hocevar started the 2023 season with a twelfth-place finish at Daytona. He scored his first career win at Texas in double-overtime after race leader Nick Sanchez made contact with Zane Smith on the final lap and Hocevar unintentionally spun Sanchez from behind. Hocevar also scored wins at Nashville and Richmond. He won at Homestead to make the Championship 4. During the race, he spun out Corey Heim, which also collected Stewart Friesen. After that, Heim retaliated on Hocevar so he finished 29th. After Heim slammed him on the turn 4 wall in retaliation for spinning him earlier in the race, he also finished fourth in the final points standings. After NASCAR penalized Heim 25 driver points for intentionally wrecking him, Hocevar was credited with a third-place points finish.

On April 18, 2025, it was announced that Hocevar would achieve 500 career wins for Spire Motorsports in their No. 7 truck in four races. In his second start with Spire, he would earn his fifth career win at Kansas.

On January 29, 2026, it was announced that Hocevar would run the season opening race at Daytona, running the No. 77 truck for Spire. He won his sixth career race at Texas.

=== NASCAR O'Reilly Auto Parts Series ===
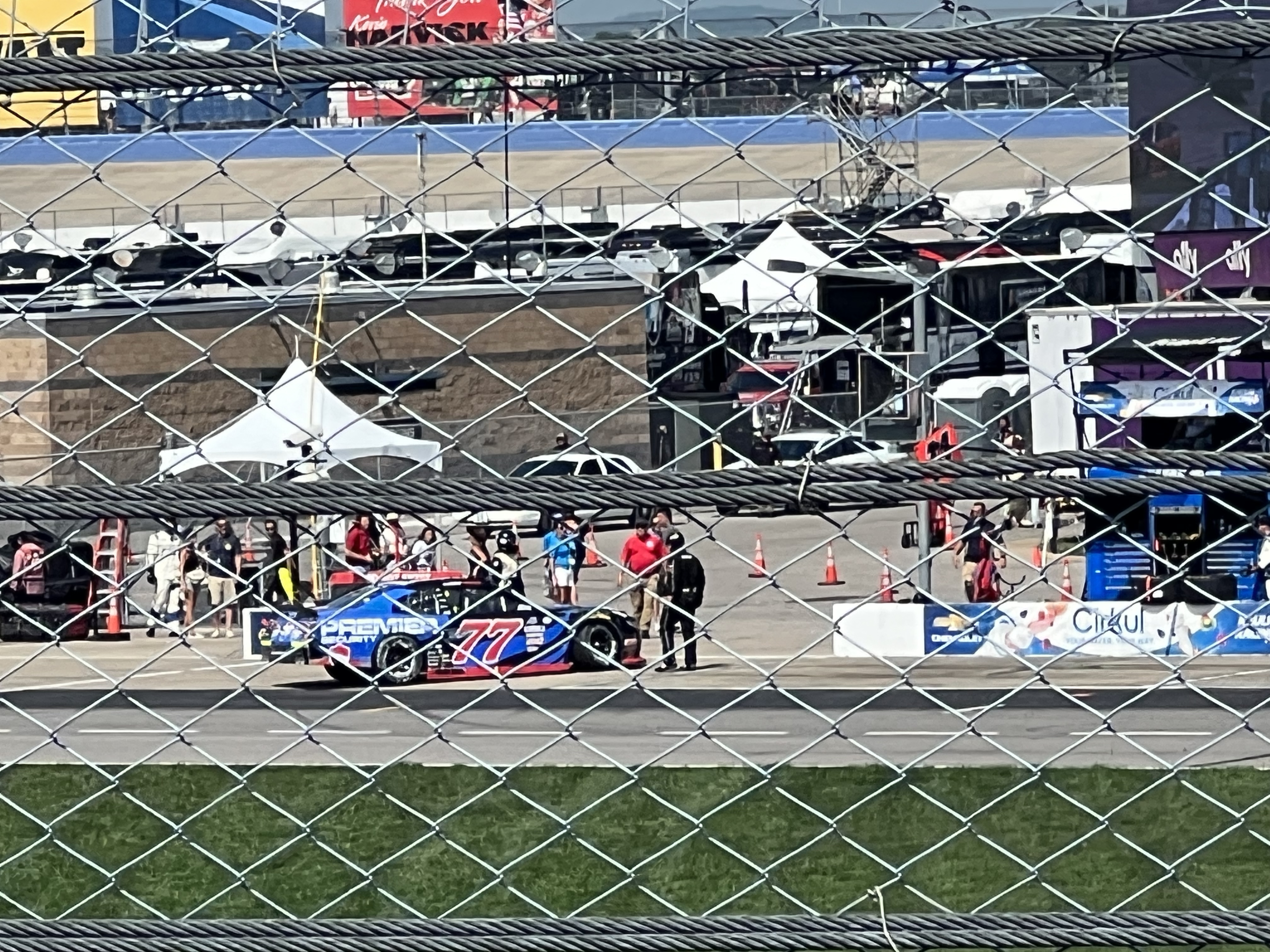
Hocevar takes his damaged car out of the race at Nashville Superspeedway in 2023.

On March 7, 2023, Spire Motorsports announced that they will expand their racing operations to the NASCAR Xfinity Series, with Hocevar running six races in their No. 77 car, making his debut in the series at Circuit of the Americas in the No. 07 for SS-Green Light Racing He was initially on the entry list for the race at Dover Motor Speedway, but was withdrawn due to the weather providing the risk of qualifying being canceled. His debut with the team was thus scheduled for the next race at Darlington Raceway. He would finish sixth at Darlington and eighth at Charlotte Motor Speedway but would DNF at Nashville Superspeedway.

On February 24, 2025, it was announced that Hocevar would drive for SS-Green Light Racing with BRK Racing, replacing Garrett Smithley at COTA. He was involved in an early wreck, earning a 38th place DNF. On July 30, shortly after Josh Williams was released by Kaulig Racing, it was announced that he would drive the No. 11 for the team at Iowa.

=== NASCAR Cup Series ===
==== 2023: Part-time ====
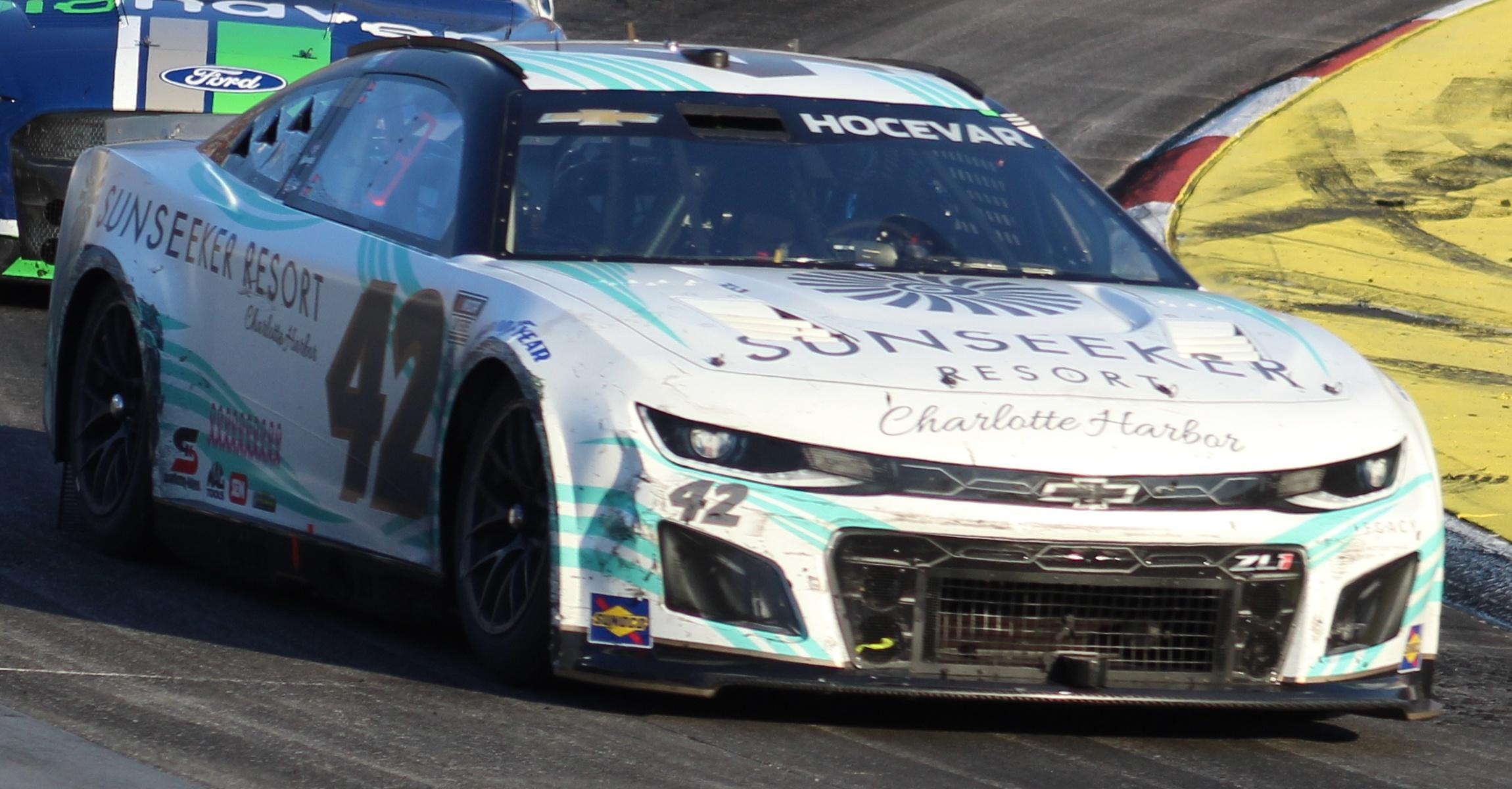
Hocevar's No. 42 car at Martinsville Speedway in 2023

On May 30, 2023, Hocevar was named the driver of the No. 7 Spire Motorsports Camaro ZL1 for the Enjoy Illinois 300 at Gateway Motorsports Park after Spire's full-time driver Corey LaJoie would fill in the No. 9 Hendrick Motorsports Chevy while HMS driver Chase Elliott served a one-race suspension. He finished in 36th place after suffering a brake rotor explosion going into turn 1 in the second stage on lap 91 while running in 16th place. Hocevar drove the Legacy Motor Club No. 42 (originally driven by Noah Gragson, then by Josh Berry and Mike Rockenfeller on road courses after Gragson was suspended prior to the Michigan race) to a 17th-place finish at Darlington. He then scored a career-best 11th-place finish at the Bristol night race. On October 4, Hocevar was signed to drive the No. 42 for the remainder of the season, except at Homestead-Miami where the team's 2024 driver John Hunter Nemechek drove in the No. 42 car instead.

==== 2024–present: Spire Motorsports ====
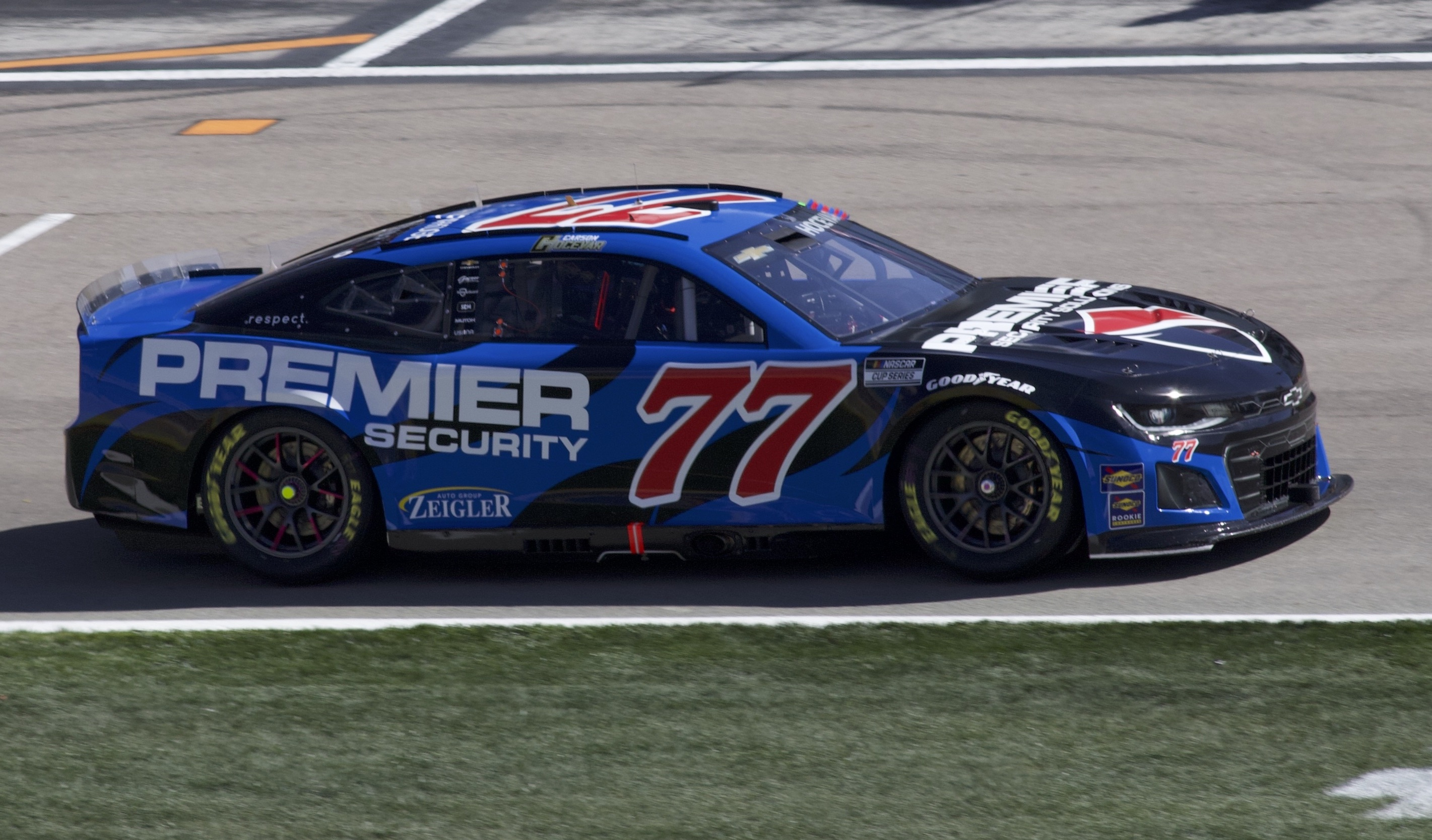
Hocevar's No. 77 car at Las Vegas Motor Speedway in 2024

On October 10, 2023, Hocevar announced on NASCAR Race Hub that he would bypass competing full-time in the Xfinity Series to join Spire Motorsports in the Cup Series full-time for the 2024 season, driving the No. 77 car under a multi-year deal. Hocevar started the season with a 40th place DNF at the 2024 Daytona 500 after an early crash. He scored his first career top-ten finish at Texas. At Nashville, Hocevar spun out Harrison Burton during a caution lap; as a result, he was fined US$50,000 and docked 25 driver points. At Richmond, Hocevar would score his third top-ten finish of the season, tying his best finish of eighth. In qualifying for the regular season finale at Darlington, Hocevar put the 77 car on the front row, qualifying second. It was the best starting spot for Spire Motorsports in the team's history, along with Hocevar's best starting spot for his own Cup career. Unfortunately, Hocevar would crash on Lap 335 and would DNF in 33rd place. At Watkins Glen on September 15, Hocevar once again eclipsed his best career NCS finish for the third time in 2024 with a third-place finish, leading a triple top-ten for Spire Motorsports and even contending for the win in the final restarts. At the end of the season, he won the NASCAR Rookie of the Year award.

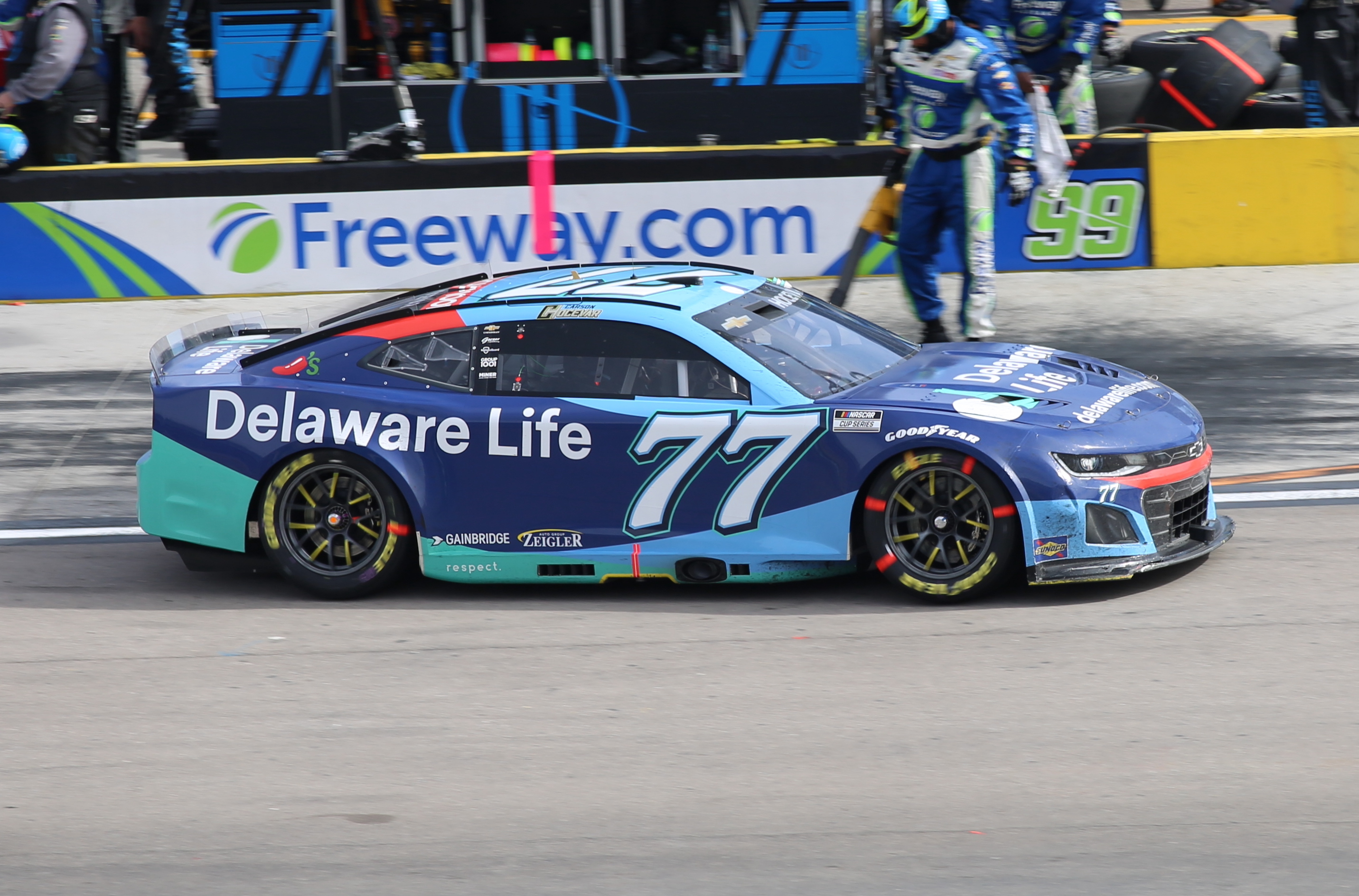
Hocevar's No. 77 car at Las Vegas Motor Speedway in 2025

Hocevar started the 2025 season with a 30th-place DNF at the 2025 Daytona 500. The following week at Atlanta, Hocevar improved upon his career best finish with a second place in which he was battling three wide behind Christopher Bell and ahead of Kyle Larson when a caution flew coming to the checkered flag during an overtime restart. At Texas, he would earn his first career Cup Series pole. At Nashville, Hocevar again tied his best finish of second, losing to Ryan Blaney. Following the Mexico road race, Spire Motorsports fined Hocevar US$50,000 and ordered him to undergo cultural-sensitivity and bias-awareness training for making scathing comments regarding his experience in Mexico City during a livestream. During the Hollywood Casino 400, Hocevar spun, and after safety personnel had arrived at the crash scene, officials indicated that Hocevar revved and spun his tires in an attempt to rejoin the field while those safety workers attended to his car. On October 1, Hocevar was fined US$50,000 for member conduct violations.

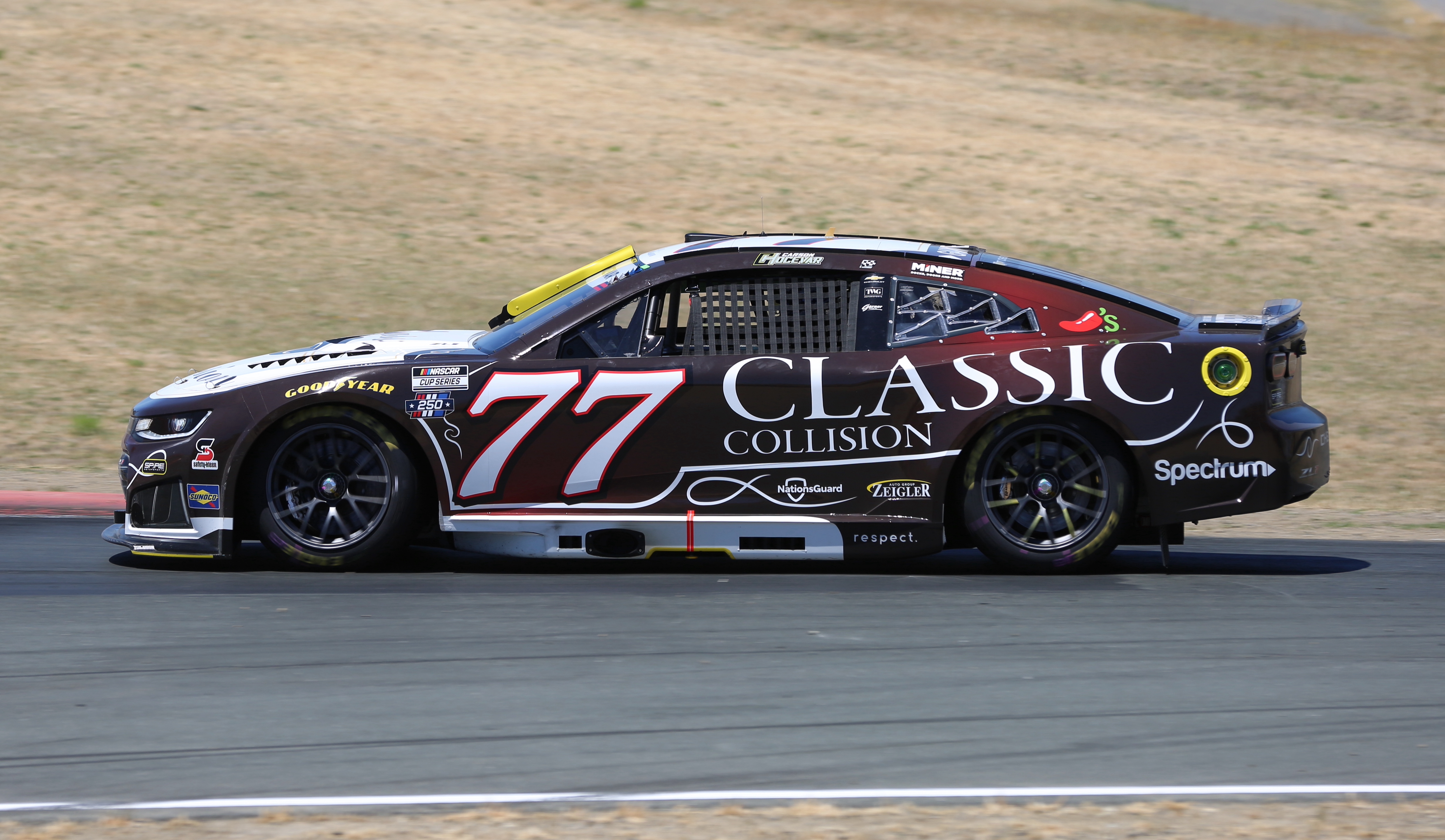
Hocevar at Sonoma Raceway in 2026

Hocevar started the 2026 season with an 18th-place finish at the 2026 Daytona 500 after taking the white flag in the lead but being subsequently spun from behind entering turn one. Despite the spin, it was the first time Hocevar finished the Daytona 500 in three attempts. On April 26, he scored his first career win at Talladega. After doing a burnout in front of the start-finish line, Hocevar backtracked down the frontstretch and turned around to face the normal direction of traffic. After struggling to get in position, he popped the clutch to get the car rolling and climbed onto the door sill of the car where he proceeded to drive the car slowly while hanging out of the driver's window. Hocevar nearly hit the wall shortly after getting rolling while he reattached the steering wheel, but caught the car and maneuvered back onto the racing surface, celebrated with his upper body hanging out of the car, and nosed into the wall to do another burnout. Despite hitting the wall head-on at low speed, he was uninjured except for a cut on his hand from the roof rail at the moment of impact and some discomfort in his legs. The dangerous celebration was applauded by NASCAR CEO Steve O'Donnell, who called it "the coolest celebration I've ever seen." When asked why he chose that celebration, Hocevar stated that he was inspired by Dale Earnhardt Jr's celebration at the 2014 Daytona 500 and wanted the fans to see that he was grateful for and enjoying their celebration, which would in turn make them more excited.

At San Diego, Hocevar was spun while battling eventual race winner Corey Heim, after which the two exchanged barbs on social media. Later in the season, after a race at Chicagoland Speedway in which the two were involved in an incident together, Zane Smith attacked Hocevar on the Racin' With the Boys podcast for his aggression and for being inconsistent in his personal conduct with other drivers. Smith claimed that Hocevar would at times act apologetic and amenable after incidents when directly interacting with other drivers, but contrarily act smug and arrogant on social media when amidst a controversy, a pattern of behavior Smith described as cowardly.

At Bristol on lap 457, Hocevar spun Ryan Blaney after Blaney moved down the track to block him. After the race, Hocevar and Blaney fought on pit road.

At Martinsville in October, Hocevar was involved in incident with Austin Cindric, where Hocevar brake checked Cindric multiple times. As a result, Hocevar was suspended by Spire for the following race at Homestead, and was replaced by Justin Haley. Hocevar was also docked 25 points and fined US$100,000 by NASCAR.

=== Other racing ===
Hocevar has also run in Midgets, Micro Sprints, and Dirt Super Late Models on a part-time basis in addition to his full-time rides since 2015. On November 15, 2025, Hocevar and co-driver, Cleetus McFarland, won the fifth-annual 2.4 Hours of LeMullets at the Freedom Factory.

== Driving style ==
Hocevar's very aggressive and somewhat reckless driving style has been met with polarized opinions from fellow drivers, sports journalists, and fans. He was given the nickname of "Hurricane Hocevar" by announcer Leigh Diffey.

== Personal life ==
Hocevar is the son of Scott and Amy Hocevar. He graduated from Gull Lake High School in 2021.

As a child, Hocevar raced Quarter Midgets and was exposed to many notable drivers through his father, who worked as a crew member and sponsor for various local teams. Through this connection, Carson was heavily mentored by Bryan Clauson, for whom Scott Hocevar served as a crew member. Later, he was also mentored by Johnny Benson, who was sponsored by Carson's father. This allowed Carson to work as a mechanic on Benson's racecars and later drive for him in his Outlaw Late Model program.

From 2020 to 2024, Hocevar was in a relationship with Late Model racer Peyton Lanphear. In early 2026, he had been teasing that he had a celebrity crush with singer Sabrina Carpenter. He attended the 2026 Met Gala with E! and stated that he hoped to run into Carpenter. In mid 2026, Hocevar was linked as being in a relationship with social media influencer Tabitha Swatosh after the pair were seen together at several races and events, including the Met Gala.

=== In media ===
In March 2025, Hocevar became a member of NASCAR on Fox's Cup driver-only broadcast team for the 2025 Baptist Health 200 at Homestead–Miami Speedway, working as a pit reporter. In 2026, Hocevar filled in for High Limit Racing as a pit reporter. He said he watches High Limit frequently. On June 23, he hosted The Dale Jr. Download.

== Motorsports career results ==
=== Stock car career summary ===
Season	Series	Team	Races	Wins	Top 5	Top 10	Points	Position
2018	CARS Super Late Model Tour	N/A	1	0	0	1	0	N/A
2018	ARCA Racing Series	KBR Development	3	0	2	2	645	31st
2019	ARCA Menards Series	KBR Development	12	0	4	10	2320	12th
2019	NASCAR Gander Outdoors Truck Series	Jordan Anderson Racing	2	0	0	0	29	62nd
2020	CARS Super Late Model Tour	N/A	1	0	0	0	0	N/A
2020	NASCAR Gander RV & Outdoors Truck Series	Niece Motorsports	7	0	0	0	125	37th
2021	ARCA Menards Series	Niece Motorsports	1	0	1	1	40	72nd
2021	NASCAR Camping World Truck Series	Niece Motorsports	22	0	3	8	2204	10th
2022	ARCA Menards Series West	Niece Motorsports	1	0	0	0	44	65th
2022	NASCAR Camping World Truck Series	Niece Motorsports	23	0	7	12	2186	10th
2023	ASA STARS National Tour	Scott's Racing	4	0	2	2	199	16th
2023	CARS Pro Late Model Tour	N/A	1	0	0	0	16	64th
2023	NASCAR Craftsman Truck Series	Niece Motorsports	23	4	11	13	4008	**3rd**
2023	NASCAR Xfinity Series	SS-Green Light Racing	1	0	0	0	0	NC†
2023	NASCAR Xfinity Series	Spire Motorsports	4	0	0	2	0	NC†
2023	NASCAR Cup Series	Spire Motorsports	1	0	0	0	0	NC†
2023	NASCAR Cup Series	Legacy Motor Club	8	0	0	0	0	NC†
2024	NASCAR Cup Series	Spire Motorsports	36	0	1	6	686	21st
2025	ASA STARS National Tour	Ed VanMeter	1	0	0	0	37	58th
2025	NASCAR Craftsman Truck Series	Spire Motorsports	4	1	1	1	0	NC†
2025	NASCAR Xfinity Series	SS-Green Light Racing with BRK Racing	1	0	0	0	0	NC†
2025	NASCAR Xfinity Series	Kaulig Racing	1	0	0	1	0	NC†
2025	NASCAR Cup Series	Spire Motorsports	36	0	2	9	702	23rd
2026	ASA STARS National Tour	Wauters Motorsports	1	0	1	1		
2026	NASCAR Craftsman Truck Series	Spire Motorsports	10	1	3	4	0	NC†
2026	NASCAR O'Reilly Auto Parts Series	Young's Motorsports	1	0	0	0	0	NC†
2026	NASCAR Cup Series	Spire Motorsports	35	1	6	12	2234	14th

^{†} As Hocevar was running for points in the Truck Series, he was ineligible for championship points in the Cup and Xfinity Series.

=== NASCAR ===
(key) (Bold – Pole position awarded by qualifying time. Italics – Pole position earned by points standings or practice time. * – Most laps led.)

==== Cup Series ====
NASCAR Cup Series results
Year	Team	No.	Make	1	2	3	4	5	6	7	8	9	10	11	12	13	14	15	16	17	18	19	20	21	22	23	24	25	26	27	28	29	30	31	32	33	34	35	36	NCSC	Pts	Ref
2023	Spire Motorsports	7	Chevy	DAY	CAL	LVS	PHO	ATL	COA	RCH	BRD	MAR	TAL	DOV	KAN	DAR	CLT	GTW; 36	SON	NSH	CSC	ATL	NHA	POC	RCH	MCH	IRC	GLN	DAY											48th	0^{1}	
2023	Legacy Motor Club	42	Chevy																											DAR; 17	KAN; 20	BRI; 11	TEX; 16	TAL; 35	ROV	LVS; 36	HOM	MAR; 31	PHO; 19	48th	0^{1}	
2024	Spire Motorsports	77	Chevy	DAY; 40	ATL; 19	LVS; 15	PHO; 15	BRI; 27	COA; 22	RCH; 27	MAR; 17	TEX; 10	TAL; 17	DOV; 22	KAN; 24	DAR; 26	CLT; 21	GTW; 8	SON; 17	IOW; 14	NHA; 17	NSH; 16	CSC; 24	POC; 17	IND; 12	RCH; 8	MCH; 10	DAY; 11	DAR; 33	ATL; 16	GLN; 3	BRI; 18	KAN; 32	TAL; 14	ROV; 12	LVS; 23	HOM; 9	MAR; 25	PHO; 18	21st	686	
2025	Spire Motorsports	77	Chevy	DAY; 30	ATL; 2	COA; 13	PHO; 36	LVS; 30	HOM; 37	MAR; 19	DAR; 32	BRI; 11	TAL; 6	**TEX**; 24	KAN; 26	CLT; 34	NSH; 2	MCH; 29	MXC; 34	POC; 18	ATL; 10	CSC; 35	SON; 32	DOV; 35	IND; 10	IOW; 8	GLN; 18	RCH; 15	DAY; 34	DAR; 9	GTW; 15	BRI; 7	NHA; 11	KAN; 29	ROV; 29	LVS; 32	TAL; 6	MAR; 31	PHO; 28	23rd	702	
2026	Spire Motorsports	77	Chevy	DAY; 18	ATL; 4	COA; 31	PHO; 20	LVS; 22	DAR; 4	MAR; 17	BRI; 10	KAN; 13	TAL; 1	**TEX**; 7	GLN; 28	CLT; 23	NSH; 10	MCH; 5	POC; 20	COR; 19	SON; 11	CHI; 22	ATL; 3	NWS; 13	**IND**; 9	IOW; 31	RCH; 37	NHA; 19	DAY; 38	DAR; 11	GTW; 8	BRI; 3	KAN; 33	LVS; 12	CLT; 14	PHO; 12	TAL; 6	MAR; 21	HOM	14th	2234	

===== Daytona 500 =====
Year	Team	Manufacturer	Start	Finish
2024	Spire Motorsports	Chevrolet	9	40
2025	Spire Motorsports	Chevrolet	33	30
2026	Spire Motorsports	Chevrolet	6	18
2027	Spire Motorsports	Chevrolet		

==== O'Reilly Auto Parts Series ====
NASCAR O'Reilly Auto Parts Series results
Year	Team	No.	Make	1	2	3	4	5	6	7	8	9	10	11	12	13	14	15	16	17	18	19	20	21	22	23	24	25	26	27	28	29	30	31	32	33	NOAPSC	Pts	Ref
2023	SS-Green Light Racing	07	Chevy	DAY	CAL	LVS	PHO	ATL	COA; 38	RCH	MAR	TAL	DOV																								83rd	0^{1}	
2023	Spire Motorsports	77	Chevy											DAR; 6	CLT; 8	PIR	SON	NSH; 36	CSC	ATL	NHA	POC	ROA	MCH; 32	IRC	GLN	DAY	DAR	KAN	BRI	TEX	ROV	LVS	HOM	MAR	PHO	83rd	0^{1}	
2025	SS-Green Light Racing with BRK Racing	14	Chevy	DAY	ATL	COA; 38	PHO	LVS	HOM	MAR	DAR	BRI	CAR	TAL	TEX	CLT	NSH	MXC	POC	ATL	CSC	SON	DOV	IND													85th	0^{1}	
2025	Kaulig Racing	11	Chevy																						IOW; 6	GLN	DAY	PIR	GTW	BRI	KAN	ROV	LVS	TAL	MAR	PHO	85th	0^{1}	
2026	Young's Motorsports	42	Chevy	DAY; 20	ATL	COA	PHO	LVS	DAR	MAR	CAR	BRI	KAN	TAL	TEX	GLN	DOV	CLT	NSH	POC	COR	SON	CHI	ATL	IND	IOW	DAY	DAR	GTW	BRI	LVS	CLT	PHO	TAL	MAR	HOM	84th	0^{1}	

==== Craftsman Truck Series ====
NASCAR Craftsman Truck Series results
Year	Team	No.	Make	1	2	3	4	5	6	7	8	9	10	11	12	13	14	15	16	17	18	19	20	21	22	23	24	25	NCTC	Pts	Ref
2019	Jordan Anderson Racing	3	Chevy	DAY	ATL	LVS	MAR	TEX	DOV	KAN	CLT	TEX	IOW	GTW	CHI	KEN	POC	ELD; 25	MCH	BRI	MSP	LVS	TAL	MAR					62nd	29	
2019	Jordan Anderson Racing	56	Chevy																						PHO; 23	HOM			62nd	29	
2020	Niece Motorsports	40	Chevy	DAY	LVS	CLT	ATL	HOM	POC	KEN	TEX	KAN	KAN	MCH	DRC; 28	DOV; 12	GTW; 15	DAR	RCH; 22	BRI; 17	LVS	TAL	KAN	TEX					37th	125	
2020	Niece Motorsports	42	Chevy																						MAR; 13	PHO; 32			37th	125	
2021	Niece Motorsports	42	Chevy	DAY; 5	DRC; 14	LVS; 24	ATL; 12	BRD; 21	RCH; 12	KAN; 23	DAR; 3	COA; 7	CLT; 2	TEX; 11	NSH; 16	POC; 13	KNX; 16	GLN; 10	GTW; 8	DAR; 11	BRI; 6	LVS; 22	TAL; 25	MAR; 12	PHO; 9				10th	2204	
2022	Niece Motorsports	42	Chevy	DAY; 9	LVS; 13	ATL; 27	COA; 8	MAR; 17	BRD; 2	DAR; 2	KAN; 15	TEX; 4	CLT; 16*	GTW; 24	**SON**; 6	KNX; 35*	NSH; 3	MOH; 3	POC; 5	IRP; 21	RCH; 10	KAN; 2	BRI; 19	TAL; 28	HOM; 12	PHO; 10			10th	2186	
2023	Niece Motorsports	42	Chevy	DAY; 12	LVS; 7	ATL; 31	COA; 34	TEX; 1	BRD; 17	MAR; 34	KAN; 31	DAR; 5	NWS; 4	CLT; 4	GTW; 4	NSH; 1	MOH; 12	POC; 11	RCH; 1	IRP; 4	MLW; 2	KAN; 6	BRI; 4	TAL; 11	HOM; 1	PHO; 29			3rd	4008	
2025	Spire Motorsports	7	Chevy	DAY	ATL	LVS	HOM	MAR	BRI	CAR	TEX; 17	KAN; 1*	NWS	CLT	NSH	MCH; 11*	POC; 13	LRP	IRP	GLN	RCH	DAR	BRI	NHA	ROV	TAL	MAR	PHO	78th	0^{1}	
2026	Spire Motorsports	77	Chevy	DAY; 35*	ATL; 2	STP	DAR; 22	CAR; 34	BRI; 9	TEX; 1*	GLN; 31	DOV; 31	CLT	NSH	MCH; 3*	COR	LRP	NWS; 27	IRP	RCH	NHA	BRI	KAN	CLT	PHO	TAL	MAR	HOM	94th	0^{1}	

^{*} Season still in progress
^{1} Ineligible for series points

=== ARCA Menards Series ===
(key) (Bold – Pole position awarded by qualifying time. Italics – Pole position earned by points standings or practice time. * – Most laps led.)

ARCA Menards Series results
Year	Team	No.	Make	1	2	3	4	5	6	7	8	9	10	11	12	13	14	15	16	17	18	19	20	AMSC	Pts	Ref
2018	KBR Development	35	Chevy	DAY	NSH	SLM	TAL	TOL; 11	CLT	POC	MCH	MAD	GTW	CHI	IOW	ELK	**BLN**; 4	POC	ISF	DSF	IRP; 5	SLM	KAN	31st	645	
2019	KBR Development	28	Chevy	DAY	FIF; 17	**SLM**; 3	TAL	NSH; 4	TOL; 6	CLT	POC	MCH	MAD; 6	GTW; 5	CHI	ELK; 6	IOW; 4	POC	ISF; 8	DSF; 15	SLM; 7	IRP; 9	KAN	12th	2320	
2021	Niece Motorsports	50	Chevy	DAY	PHO	TAL	KAN	TOL	CLT	MOH	POC	ELK	BLN	IOW	WIN	GLN; 4	MCH	ISF	MLW	DSF	BRI	SLM	KAN	72nd	40	

==== ARCA Menards Series West ====
ARCA Menards Series West results
Year	Team	No.	Make	1	2	3	4	5	6	7	8	9	10	11	AMSWC	Pts	Ref
2022	Niece Motorsports	40	Chevy	PHO	IRW	KCR	PIR	SON	IRW	EVG	PIR	AAS	LVS	PHO; 29	44th	65	

=== CARS Super Late Model Tour ===
(key)

CARS Super Late Model Tour results
Year	Team	No.	Make	1	2	3	4	5	6	7	8	9	CSLMTC	Pts	Ref
2018	N/A	14	Chevy	MYB	NSH; 10	ROU	HCY	BRI	AND	HCY	ROU	SBO	N/A	0	
2020	N/A	14H	Chevy	SNM	HCY	JEN	HCY	FCS	BRI	FLC	NSH; 21		N/A	0	

=== CARS Pro Late Model Tour ===
(key)

CARS Pro Late Model Tour results
Year	Team	No.	Make	1	2	3	4	5	6	7	8	9	10	11	12	13	CPLMTC	Pts	Ref
2023	N/A	14	Chevy	SNM	HCY	ACE	NWS; 17	TCM	DIL	CRW	WKS	HCY	TCM	SBO	TCM	CRW	64th	16	

=== ASA STARS National Tour ===
(key) (Bold – Pole position awarded by qualifying time. Italics – Pole position earned by points standings or practice time. * – Most laps led. ** – All laps led.)

ASA STARS National Tour results
Year	Team	No.	Make	1	2	3	4	5	6	7	8	9	10	11	12	ASNTC	Pts	Ref
2023	Scott's Racing	14H	Chevy	FIF; 5	MAD		HCY; 21									16th	199	
2023	Scott's Racing	14	Chevy			NWS; 18		MLW; 4	AND	WIR	TOL	WIN	NSV			16th	199	
2025	Ed VanMeter	77	Chevy	NSM	FIF	DOM	HCY	NPS	MAD	SLG	AND; 15	OWO	TOL	WIN	NSV	58th	37	
2026	Wauters Motorsports	77	Chevy	NSM; 5	FIF	HCY	SLG	MAD	NPS	OWO	TRI	WIN	NSV	NSM		-*	-*	

Achievements
Preceded by Stephen Nasse	Winchester 400 Winner; 2020	Succeeded by Sammy Smith
Preceded by Johnny VanDoorn	Redbud 400 Winner; 2020	Succeeded by Kyle Crump
Preceded by Brian Campbell; Bubba Pollard	Money in the Bank 150 Winner; 2020, 2021, 2025	Succeeded by William Byron; Ty Majeski
Preceded by Keith McGee and Derek Bieri	2.4 Hours of LeMullets Winner; 2025, 2026	Succeeded by Incumbent
