= 2025 Würth 400 =

NASCAR Cup Series race

2025 Würth 400 presented by LIQUI MOLY
Race details
- Race 11 of 36 in the 2025 NASCAR Cup Series
- Date: May 4, 2025
- Location: Texas Motor Speedway in Fort Worth, Texas
- Course: Permanent racing facility
- Course length: 1.5 miles (2.4 km)
- Distance: 271 laps, 406.5 mi (650.4 km)
- Scheduled distance: 267 laps, 400.5 mi (640.8 km)
- Average speed: 116.885 miles per hour (188.108 km/h)

Pole position
| Driver | Carson Hocevar | Spire Motorsports |
- Time: 28.175

Most laps led
| Driver | Kyle Larson | Hendrick Motorsports |
- Laps: 90

Fastest lap
| Driver | Carson Hocevar | Spire Motorsports |
- Time: 28.556

Winner
| No. 22 | Joey Logano | Team Penske |

Television in the United States
- Network: FS1
- Announcers: Mike Joy, Clint Bowyer, and Kevin Harvick
- Nielsen ratings: 2.560 million

Radio in the United States
- Radio: PRN
- Booth announcers: Brad Gillie and Mark Garrow
- Turn announcers: Rob Albright (1 & 2) and Pat Patterson (3 & 4)

The 2025 Würth 400 presented by LIQUI MOLY was a NASCAR Cup Series race that was held on May 4, 2025, at Texas Motor Speedway in Fort Worth, Texas. Contested over 271 laps, extended from 267 laps due to an overtime finish on the 1.5 mile (2.4 km) intermediate quad-oval, it was the eleventh race of the 2025 NASCAR Cup Series season.

Joey Logano won the race. Ross Chastain finished 2nd, and Ryan Blaney finished 3rd. Kyle Larson and Erik Jones rounded out the top five, and Ricky Stenhouse Jr., Austin Dillon, John Hunter Nemechek, Christopher Bell, and Daniel Suárez rounded out the top ten.

== Report ==
=== Background ===
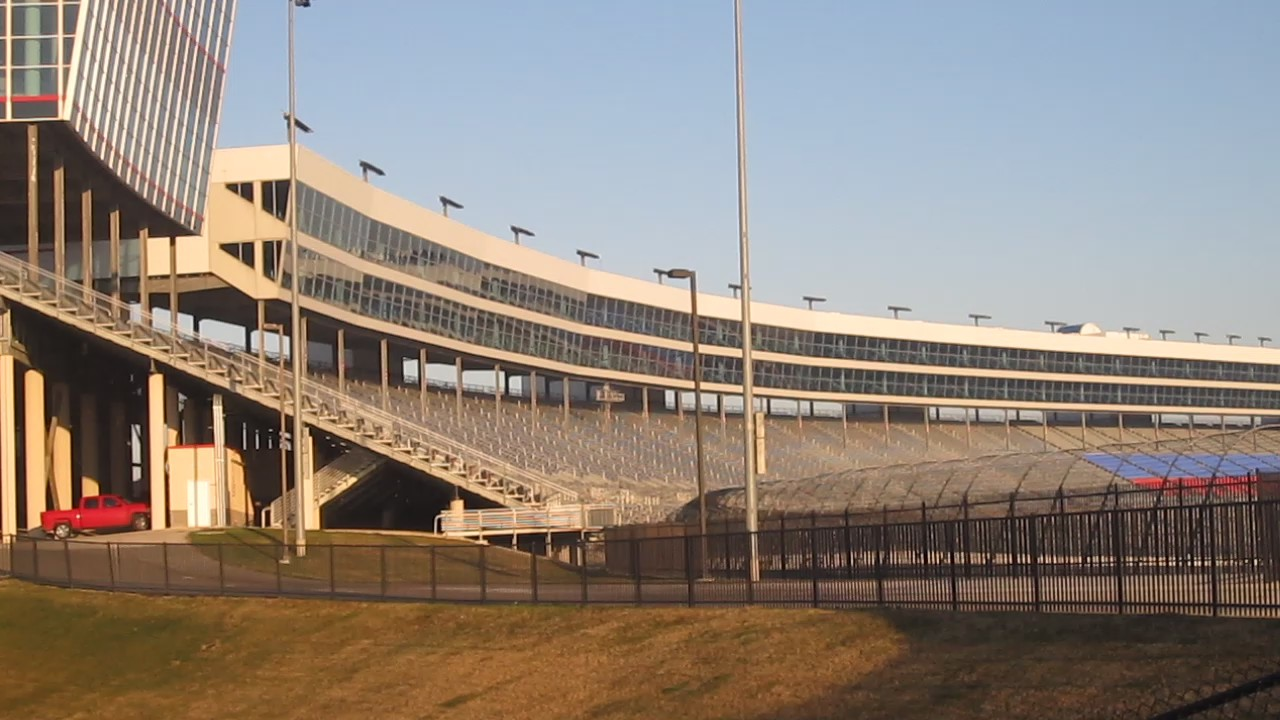
Texas Motor Speedway, the track where the race will be held.

Texas Motor Speedway is a speedway located in the northernmost portion of the U.S. city of Fort Worth, Texas – the portion located in Denton County, Texas. The track measures 1.5 miles (2.4 km) around and is banked 24 degrees in the turns, and is of the oval design, where the front straightaway juts outward slightly. The track layout is similar to Atlanta Motor Speedway and Charlotte Motor Speedway (formerly Lowe's Motor Speedway). The track is owned by Speedway Motorsports, Inc., the same company that owns Atlanta and Charlotte Motor Speedway, as well as the short-track Bristol Motor Speedway.

==== Entry list ====
- (R) denotes rookie driver.
- (i) denotes driver who is ineligible for series driver points.

| No. | Driver | Team | Manufacturer |
|---|---|---|---|
| 1 | Ross Chastain | Trackhouse Racing | Chevrolet |
| 2 | Austin Cindric | Team Penske | Ford |
| 3 | Austin Dillon | Richard Childress Racing | Chevrolet |
| 4 | Noah Gragson | Front Row Motorsports | Ford |
| 5 | Kyle Larson | Hendrick Motorsports | Chevrolet |
| 6 | Brad Keselowski | RFK Racing | Ford |
| 7 | Justin Haley | Spire Motorsports | Chevrolet |
| 8 | Kyle Busch | Richard Childress Racing | Chevrolet |
| 9 | Chase Elliott | Hendrick Motorsports | Chevrolet |
| 10 | Ty Dillon | Kaulig Racing | Chevrolet |
| 11 | Denny Hamlin | Joe Gibbs Racing | Toyota |
| 12 | Ryan Blaney | Team Penske | Ford |
| 16 | A. J. Allmendinger | Kaulig Racing | Chevrolet |
| 17 | Chris Buescher | RFK Racing | Ford |
| 19 | Chase Briscoe | Joe Gibbs Racing | Toyota |
| 20 | Christopher Bell | Joe Gibbs Racing | Toyota |
| 21 | Josh Berry | Wood Brothers Racing | Ford |
| 22 | Joey Logano | Team Penske | Ford |
| 23 | Bubba Wallace | 23XI Racing | Toyota |
| 24 | William Byron | Hendrick Motorsports | Chevrolet |
| 34 | Todd Gilliland | Front Row Motorsports | Ford |
| 35 | Riley Herbst (R) | 23XI Racing | Toyota |
| 38 | Zane Smith | Front Row Motorsports | Ford |
| 41 | Cole Custer | Haas Factory Team | Ford |
| 42 | John Hunter Nemechek | Legacy Motor Club | Toyota |
| 43 | Erik Jones | Legacy Motor Club | Toyota |
| 45 | Tyler Reddick | 23XI Racing | Toyota |
| 47 | Ricky Stenhouse Jr. | Hyak Motorsports | Chevrolet |
| 48 | Alex Bowman | Hendrick Motorsports | Chevrolet |
| 51 | Cody Ware | Rick Ware Racing | Ford |
| 54 | Ty Gibbs | Joe Gibbs Racing | Toyota |
| 60 | Ryan Preece | RFK Racing | Ford |
| 62 | Jesse Love (i) | Beard Motorsports | Chevrolet |
| 66 | Chad Finchum | Garage 66 | Ford |
| 71 | Michael McDowell | Spire Motorsports | Chevrolet |
| 77 | Carson Hocevar | Spire Motorsports | Chevrolet |
| 88 | Shane van Gisbergen (R) | Trackhouse Racing | Chevrolet |
| 99 | Daniel Suárez | Trackhouse Racing | Chevrolet |
Official entry list

== Practice ==
Carson Hocevar was the fastest in the practice session with a time of 28.288 seconds and a speed of 190.894 mph (307.214 km/h).

=== Practice results ===
| Pos | No. | Driver | Team | Manufacturer | Time | Speed |
|---|---|---|---|---|---|---|
| 1 | 77 | Carson Hocevar | Spire Motorsports | Chevrolet | 28.288 | 190.894 |
| 2 | 16 | A. J. Allmendinger | Kaulig Racing | Chevrolet | 28.389 | 190.215 |
| 3 | 4 | Noah Gragson | Front Row Motorsports | Ford | 28.421 | 190.000 |
Official practice results

== Qualifying ==
Carson Hocevar scored the pole for the race with a time of 28.175 and a speed of 191.659 mph (308.445 km/h).

=== Qualifying results ===
| Pos | No. | Driver | Team | Manufacturer | Time | Speed |
|---|---|---|---|---|---|---|
| 1 | 77 | Carson Hocevar | Spire Motorsports | Chevrolet | 28.175 | 191.659 |
| 2 | 24 | William Byron | Hendrick Motorsports | Chevrolet | 28.189 | 191.564 |
| 3 | 2 | Austin Cindric | Team Penske | Ford | 28.195 | 191.523 |
| 4 | 5 | Kyle Larson | Hendrick Motorsports | Chevrolet | 28.210 | 191.421 |
| 5 | 71 | Michael McDowell | Spire Motorsports | Chevrolet | 28.223 | 191.333 |
| 6 | 54 | Ty Gibbs | Joe Gibbs Racing | Toyota | 28.229 | 191.293 |
| 7 | 21 | Josh Berry | Wood Brothers Racing | Ford | 28.233 | 191.266 |
| 8 | 11 | Denny Hamlin | Joe Gibbs Racing | Toyota | 28.248 | 191.164 |
| 9 | 23 | Bubba Wallace | 23XI Racing | Toyota | 28.249 | 191.157 |
| 10 | 16 | A. J. Allmendinger | Kaulig Racing | Chevrolet | 28.276 | 190.975 |
| 11 | 48 | Alex Bowman | Hendrick Motorsports | Chevrolet | 28.284 | 190.921 |
| 12 | 17 | Chris Buescher | RFK Racing | Ford | 28.309 | 190.752 |
| 13 | 38 | Zane Smith | Front Row Motorsports | Ford | 28.325 | 190.644 |
| 14 | 43 | Erik Jones | Legacy Motor Club | Toyota | 28.334 | 190.584 |
| 15 | 7 | Justin Haley | Spire Motorsports | Chevrolet | 28.337 | 190.564 |
| 16 | 20 | Christopher Bell | Joe Gibbs Racing | Toyota | 28.356 | 190.436 |
| 17 | 45 | Tyler Reddick | 23XI Racing | Toyota | 28.363 | 190.389 |
| 18 | 4 | Noah Gragson | Front Row Motorsports | Ford | 28.368 | 190.355 |
| 19 | 3 | Austin Dillon | Richard Childress Racing | Chevrolet | 28.381 | 190.268 |
| 20 | 41 | Cole Custer | Haas Factory Team | Ford | 28.438 | 189.887 |
| 21 | 35 | Riley Herbst (R) | 23XI Racing | Toyota | 28.447 | 189.827 |
| 22 | 19 | Chase Briscoe | Joe Gibbs Racing | Toyota | 28.449 | 189.813 |
| 23 | 10 | Ty Dillon | Kaulig Racing | Chevrolet | 28.475 | 189.640 |
| 24 | 12 | Ryan Blaney | Team Penske | Ford | 28.512 | 189.394 |
| 25 | 99 | Daniel Suárez | Trackhouse Racing | Chevrolet | 28.532 | 189.261 |
| 26 | 8 | Kyle Busch | Richard Childress Racing | Chevrolet | 28.541 | 189.201 |
| 27 | 22 | Joey Logano | Team Penske | Ford | 28.545 | 189.175 |
| 28 | 42 | John Hunter Nemechek | Legacy Motor Club | Toyota | 28.554 | 189.115 |
| 29 | 9 | Chase Elliott | Hendrick Motorsports | Chevrolet | 28.588 | 188.890 |
| 30 | 6 | Brad Keselowski | RFK Racing | Ford | 28.636 | 188.574 |
| 31 | 1 | Ross Chastain | Trackhouse Racing | Chevrolet | 28.658 | 188.429 |
| 32 | 34 | Todd Gilliland | Front Row Motorsports | Ford | 28.659 | 188.422 |
| 33 | 60 | Ryan Preece | RFK Racing | Ford | 28.696 | 188.180 |
| 34 | 47 | Ricky Stenhouse Jr. | Hyak Motorsports | Chevrolet | 28.704 | 188.127 |
| 35 | 62 | Jesse Love (i) | Beard Motorsports | Chevrolet | 28.935 | 186.626 |
| 36 | 51 | Cody Ware | Rick Ware Racing | Ford | 28.942 | 186.580 |
| 37 | 88 | Shane van Gisbergen (R) | Trackhouse Racing | Chevrolet | 29.193 | 184.976 |
| 38 | 66 | Chad Finchum | Garage 66 | Ford | 29.833 | 181.008 |
Official qualifying results

== Race ==
=== Race results ===
==== Stage Results ====
Stage One Laps: 80

| Pos | No | Driver | Team | Manufacturer | Points |
|---|---|---|---|---|---|
| 1 | 2 | Austin Cindric | Team Penske | Ford | 10 |
| 2 | 45 | Tyler Reddick | 23XI Racing | Toyota | 9 |
| 3 | 21 | Josh Berry | Wood Brothers Racing | Ford | 8 |
| 4 | 5 | Kyle Larson | Hendrick Motorsports | Chevrolet | 7 |
| 5 | 17 | Chris Buescher | RFK Racing | Ford | 6 |
| 6 | 77 | Carson Hocevar | Spire Motorsports | Chevrolet | 5 |
| 7 | 24 | William Byron | Hendrick Motorsports | Chevrolet | 4 |
| 8 | 54 | Ty Gibbs | Joe Gibbs Racing | Toyota | 3 |
| 9 | 71 | Michael McDowell | Spire Motorsports | Chevrolet | 2 |
| 10 | 43 | Erik Jones | Legacy Motor Club | Toyota | 1 |
Official stage one results

Stage Two Laps: 85

| Pos | No | Driver | Team | Manufacturer | Points |
|---|---|---|---|---|---|
| 1 | 5 | Kyle Larson | Hendrick Motorsports | Chevrolet | 10 |
| 2 | 45 | Tyler Reddick | 23XI Racing | Toyota | 9 |
| 3 | 48 | Alex Bowman | Hendrick Motorsports | Chevrolet | 8 |
| 4 | 60 | Ryan Preece | RFK Racing | Ford | 7 |
| 5 | 23 | Bubba Wallace | 23XI Racing | Toyota | 6 |
| 6 | 77 | Carson Hocevar | Spire Motorsports | Chevrolet | 5 |
| 7 | 24 | William Byron | Hendrick Motorsports | Chevrolet | 4 |
| 8 | 12 | Ryan Blaney | Team Penske | Ford | 3 |
| 9 | 22 | Joey Logano | Team Penske | Ford | 2 |
| 10 | 8 | Kyle Busch | Richard Childress Racing | Chevrolet | 1 |
Official stage two results

=== Final Stage Results ===
Stage Three Laps: 102

| Pos | Grid | No | Driver | Team | Manufacturer | Laps | Points |
|---|---|---|---|---|---|---|---|
| 1 | 27 | 22 | Joey Logano | Team Penske | Ford | 271 | 42 |
| 2 | 31 | 1 | Ross Chastain | Trackhouse Racing | Chevrolet | 271 | 35 |
| 3 | 24 | 12 | Ryan Blaney | Team Penske | Ford | 271 | 37 |
| 4 | 4 | 5 | Kyle Larson | Hendrick Motorsports | Chevrolet | 271 | 50 |
| 5 | 14 | 43 | Erik Jones | Legacy Motor Club | Toyota | 271 | 33 |
| 6 | 34 | 47 | Ricky Stenhouse Jr. | Hyak Motorsports | Chevrolet | 271 | 31 |
| 7 | 19 | 3 | Austin Dillon | Richard Childress Racing | Chevrolet | 271 | 30 |
| 8 | 28 | 42 | John Hunter Nemechek | Legacy Motor Club | Toyota | 271 | 29 |
| 9 | 16 | 20 | Christopher Bell | Joe Gibbs Racing | Toyota | 271 | 28 |
| 10 | 25 | 99 | Daniel Suárez | Trackhouse Racing | Chevrolet | 271 | 27 |
| 11 | 32 | 34 | Todd Gilliland | Front Row Motorsports | Ford | 271 | 26 |
| 12 | 23 | 10 | Ty Dillon | Kaulig Racing | Chevrolet | 271 | 25 |
| 13 | 2 | 24 | William Byron | Hendrick Motorsports | Chevrolet | 271 | 32 |
| 14 | 21 | 35 | Riley Herbst (R) | 23XI Racing | Toyota | 271 | 23 |
| 15 | 15 | 7 | Justin Haley | Spire Motorsports | Chevrolet | 271 | 22 |
| 16 | 29 | 9 | Chase Elliott | Hendrick Motorsports | Chevrolet | 271 | 21 |
| 17 | 13 | 38 | Zane Smith | Front Row Motorsports | Ford | 271 | 20 |
| 18 | 12 | 17 | Chris Buescher | RFK Racing | Ford | 271 | 25 |
| 19 | 20 | 41 | Cole Custer | Haas Factory Team | Ford | 271 | 18 |
| 20 | 26 | 8 | Kyle Busch | Richard Childress Racing | Chevrolet | 271 | 18 |
| 21 | 17 | 45 | Tyler Reddick | 23XI Racing | Toyota | 271 | 34 |
| 22 | 37 | 88 | Shane van Gisbergen (R) | Trackhouse Racing | Chevrolet | 271 | 15 |
| 23 | 6 | 54 | Ty Gibbs | Joe Gibbs Racing | Toyota | 271 | 17 |
| 24 | 1 | 77 | Carson Hocevar | Spire Motorsports | Chevrolet | 271 | 24 |
| 25 | 3 | 2 | Austin Cindric | Team Penske | Ford | 268 | 22 |
| 26 | 5 | 71 | Michael McDowell | Spire Motorsports | Chevrolet | 265 | 13 |
| 27 | 22 | 19 | Chase Briscoe | Joe Gibbs Racing | Toyota | 254 | 10 |
| 28 | 30 | 6 | Brad Keselowski | RFK Racing | Ford | 246 | 9 |
| 29 | 33 | 60 | Ryan Preece | RFK Racing | Ford | 237 | 15 |
| 30 | 36 | 51 | Cody Ware | Rick Ware Racing | Ford | 237 | 7 |
| 31 | 35 | 62 | Jesse Love (i) | Beard Motorsports | Chevrolet | 217 | 0 |
| 32 | 7 | 21 | Josh Berry | Wood Brothers Racing | Ford | 187 | 13 |
| 33 | 9 | 23 | Bubba Wallace | 23XI Racing | Toyota | 178 | 10 |
| 34 | 18 | 4 | Noah Gragson | Front Row Motorsports | Ford | 172 | 3 |
| 35 | 11 | 48 | Alex Bowman | Hendrick Motorsports | Chevrolet | 172 | 10 |
| 36 | 10 | 16 | A. J. Allmendinger | Kaulig Racing | Chevrolet | 171 | 1 |
| 37 | 38 | 66 | Chad Finchum | Garage 66 | Ford | 167 | 1 |
| 38 | 8 | 11 | Denny Hamlin | Joe Gibbs Racing | Toyota | 73 | 1 |
Official race results

=== Race statistics ===
- Lead changes: 20 among 13 different drivers
- Cautions/Laps: 12 for 73
- Red flags: 0
- Time of race: 3 hours, 28 minutes and 40 seconds
- Average speed: 116.885 miles per hour (188.108 km/h)

== Media ==
=== Television ===
Fox Sports covered the race on the television side Mike Joy, Clint Bowyer and three-time Texas winner Kevin Harvick called the race from the broadcast booth. Jamie Little and Regan Smith handled pit road for the television side, and Larry McReynolds provided insight on-site during the race.

FS1
| Booth announcers | Pit reporters | In-race analyst |
|---|---|---|
| Lap-by-lap: Mike Joy; Color-commentator: Clint Bowyer; Color-commentator: Kevin Harvick | Jamie Little; Regan Smith | Larry McReynolds |

=== Radio ===
PRN had the radio call for the race, which was also simulcast on Sirius XM NASCAR Radio. Brad Gillie & Mark Garrow covered the action for PRN when the field races down the front straightaway. Rob Albright covered the action for PRN from a platform outside of Turns 1 & 2, & Pat Patterson covered the action from a platform outside of Turns 3 & 4 for PRN. Alan Cavanna, Brett McMillan, and Doug Turnbull had the call from pit lane for PRN.

PRN
| Booth announcers | Turn announcers | Pit reporters |
|---|---|---|
| Lead announcer: Brad Gillie; Announcer: Mark Garrow | Turns 1 & 2: Rob Albright; Turns 3 & 4: Pat Patterson | Alan Cavanna; Brett McMillan; Doug Turnbull |

== Standings after the race ==
Drivers' Championship standings

| | Pos | Driver | Points |
|---|---|---|---|
| | 1 | William Byron | 421 |
| | 2 | Kyle Larson | 408 (–13) |
| | 3 | Denny Hamlin | 338 (–83) |
| | 4 | Chase Elliott | 338 (–83) |
| 1 | 5 | Tyler Reddick | 337 (–84) |
| 1 | 6 | Christopher Bell | 335 (–86) |
| 1 | 7 | Ryan Blaney | 313 (–108) |
| 1 | 8 | Bubba Wallace | 306 (–115) |
| 2 | 9 | Joey Logano | 288 (–133) |
| 1 | 10 | Alex Bowman | 284 (–137) |
| 1 | 11 | Ross Chastain | 281 (–140) |
| 1 | 12 | Chris Buescher | 255 (–166) |
| 1 | 13 | Chase Briscoe | 245 (–176) |
| | 14 | Austin Cindric | 241 (–180) |
| 2 | 15 | Ricky Stenhouse Jr. | 240 (–181) |
| | 16 | Kyle Busch | 228 (–193) |
Official driver's standings

Manufacturers' Championship standings

| Pos | Manufacturer | Points |
|---|---|---|
| 1 | Chevrolet | 397 |
| 2 | Toyota | 390 (–7) |
| 3 | Ford | 371 (–26) |

- Note: Only the first 16 positions are included for the driver standings.
- . – Driver has clinched a position in the NASCAR Cup Series playoffs.

| Previous race: 2025 Jack Link's 500 | NASCAR Cup Series; 2025 season | Next race: 2025 AdventHealth 400 |
