= 2026 Bass Pro Shops Night Race =

NASCAR Cup Series race at Bristol Motor Speedway

Race details
- Race 29 of 36 in the 2026 NASCAR Cup Series
- Date: September 19, 2026
- Location: Bristol Motor Speedway, Bristol, Tennessee
- Course: Permanent racing facility
- Course length: 0.533 miles (0.858 km)
- Distance: 500 laps, 266.5 mi (422.29 km)
- Average speed: 87.697 miles per hour (141.135 km/h)

Pole position
Driver	Kyle Larson	Hendrick Motorsports
- Grid positions set by competition-based formula

Most laps led
Driver	Ryan Blaney	Team Penske
- Laps: 202

Fastest lap
Driver	Kyle Larson	Hendrick Motorsports
- Time: 15.337

Winner
No. 22	Joey Logano	Team Penske

Television in the United States
- Network: USA
- Announcers: Leigh Diffey, Jeff Burton and Steve Letarte
- Nielsen ratings: 0.76 (1.449 million)

Radio in the United States
- Radio: PRN
- Booth announcers: Brad Gillie and Nick Yeoman
- Turn announcers: Pat Patterson (Backstretch)

The 2026 Bass Pro Shops Night Race was a NASCAR Cup Series race held on September 19, 2026, at Bristol Motor Speedway in Bristol, Tennessee on the 0.533-mile (0.858 km) concrete oval, it was the 29th race of the 2026 NASCAR Cup Series season, and the third race of the NASCAR Chase.

Joey Logano won the race. Kyle Larson finished 2nd, and Carson Hocevar finished 3rd. Christopher Bell and Ty Gibbs rounded out the top five, and Josh Berry, Bubba Wallace, Denny Hamlin, William Byron, and Ryan Preece rounded out the top ten. Larson would take the points lead from Hamlin, leading only by one point.

After the race, Ryan Blaney and Hocevar got into an altercation due to an incident that happened on lap 457.

== Report ==
=== Background ===
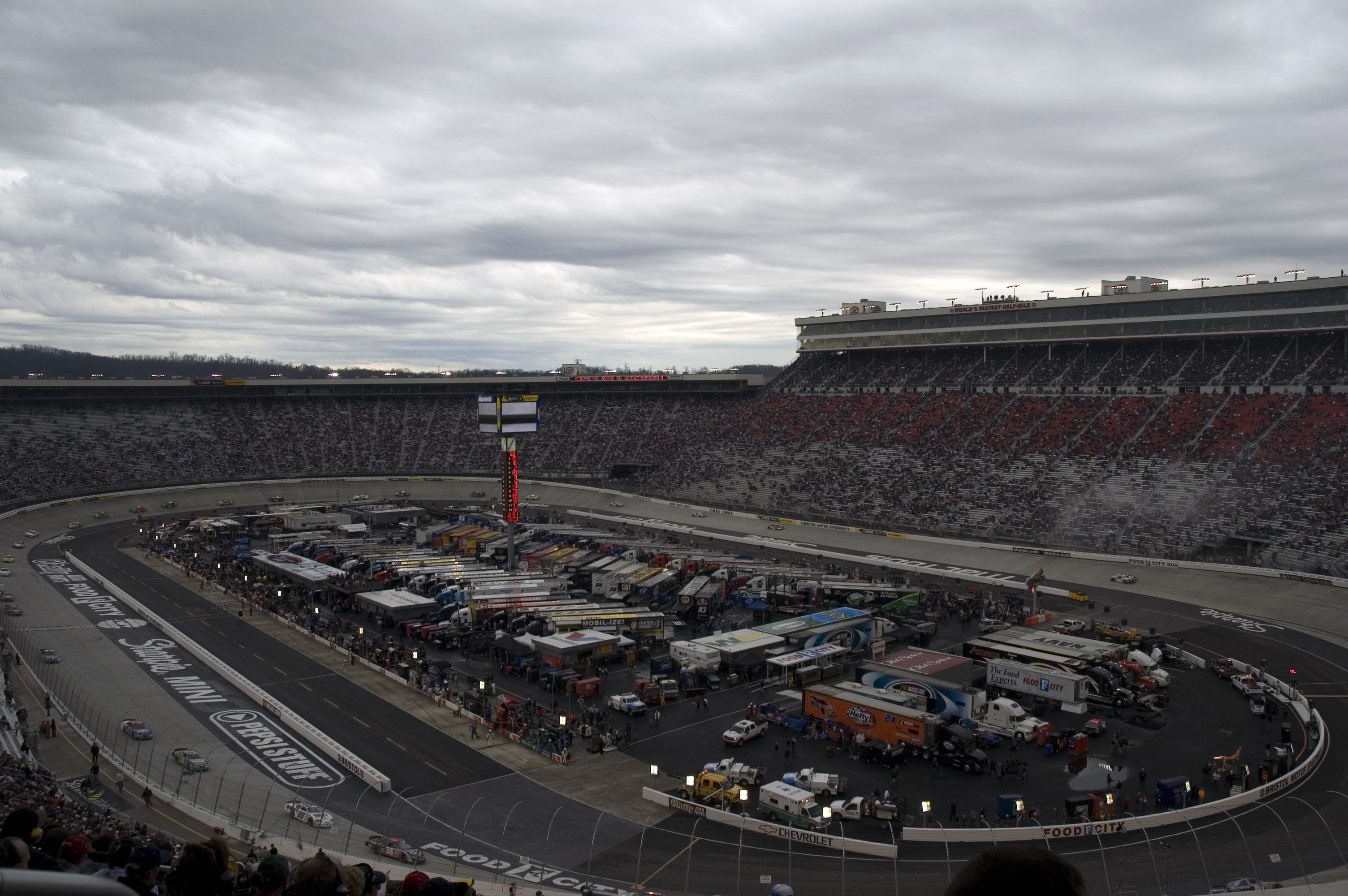
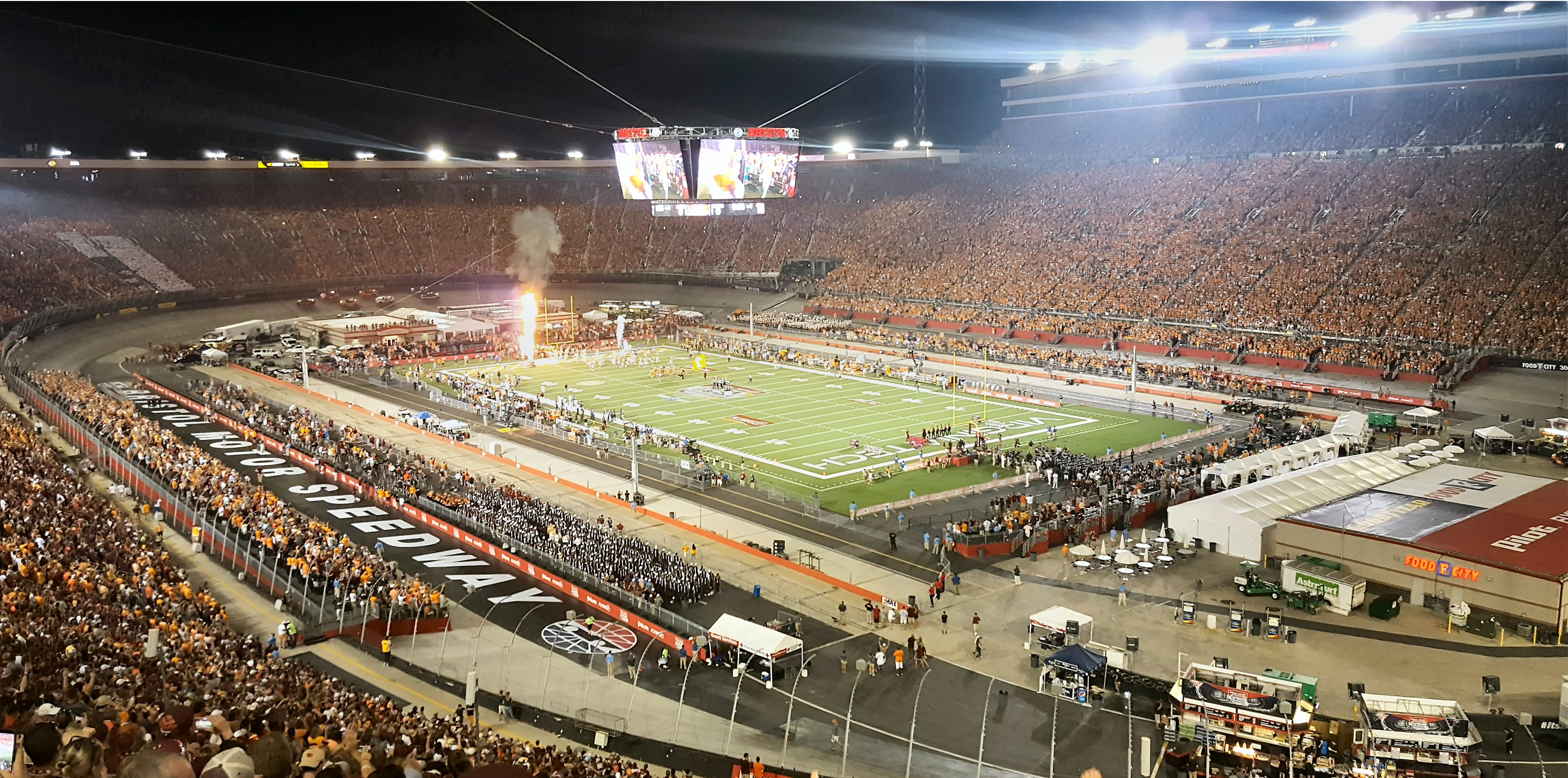
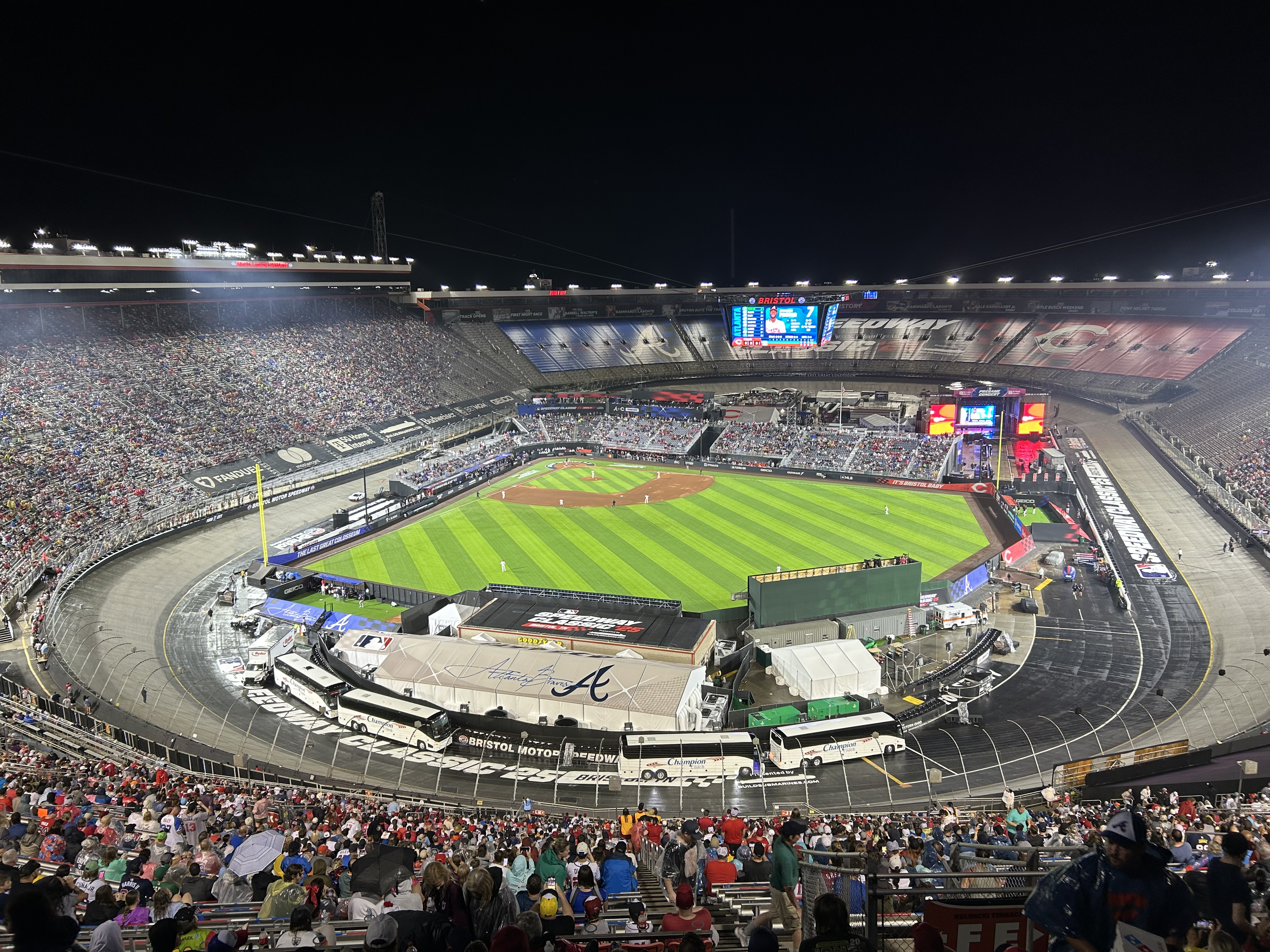
The Track (left) the Battle at Bristol (center) and the MLB Speedway Classic (right), are all events previously held at Bristol Motor Speedway.

The Bristol Motor Speedway, formerly known as Bristol International Raceway and Bristol Raceway, is a NASCAR short track venue located in Bristol, Tennessee. Constructed in 1960, it held its first NASCAR race on July 30, 1961. Despite its short length, Bristol is among the most popular tracks on the NASCAR schedule because of its distinct features, which include extraordinarily steep banking, an all concrete surface, two pit roads, and stadium-like seating. It has also been named one of the loudest NASCAR tracks.

Besides holding racing events, the track has hosted the Battle at Bristol, a college football game between the Tennessee Volunteers and Virginia Tech Hokies on September 10, 2016, and the MLB Speedway Classic, an MLB baseball game between the Atlanta Braves and the Cincinnati Reds from August 2-3, 2025.

During the offseason, NASCAR announced that Bristol would now get the short track package, as opposed to running the intermediate package from previous years.

==== Entry list ====
- (R) denotes rookie driver.
- (i) denotes driver who is ineligible for series driver points.
- (CC) denotes chase contender.

No.	Driver	Team	Manufacturer
1	Ross Chastain	Trackhouse Racing	Chevrolet
2	Austin Cindric (CC)	Team Penske	Ford
3	Austin Dillon	Richard Childress Racing	Chevrolet
4	Noah Gragson	Front Row Motorsports	Ford
5	Kyle Larson (CC)	Hendrick Motorsports	Chevrolet
6	Brad Keselowski	RFK Racing	Ford
7	Daniel Suárez (CC)	Spire Motorsports	Chevrolet
9	Chase Elliott (CC)	Hendrick Motorsports	Chevrolet
10	Ty Dillon	Kaulig Racing	Chevrolet
11	Denny Hamlin (CC)	Joe Gibbs Racing	Toyota
12	Ryan Blaney (CC)	Team Penske	Ford
16	A. J. Allmendinger	Kaulig Racing	Chevrolet
17	Chris Buescher (CC)	RFK Racing	Ford
19	Chase Briscoe (CC)	Joe Gibbs Racing	Toyota
20	Christopher Bell (CC)	Joe Gibbs Racing	Toyota
21	Josh Berry	Wood Brothers Racing	Ford
22	Joey Logano (CC)	Team Penske	Ford
23	Bubba Wallace (CC)	23XI Racing	Toyota
24	William Byron (CC)	Hendrick Motorsports	Chevrolet
33	Austin Hill (i)	Richard Childress Racing	Chevrolet
34	Todd Gilliland	Front Row Motorsports	Ford
35	Riley Herbst	23XI Racing	Toyota
38	Zane Smith	Front Row Motorsports	Ford
41	Cole Custer	Haas Factory Team	Ford
42	John Hunter Nemechek	Legacy Motor Club	Toyota
43	Erik Jones	Legacy Motor Club	Toyota
45	Tyler Reddick (CC)	23XI Racing	Toyota
47	Ricky Stenhouse Jr.	Hyak Motorsports	Chevrolet
48	Alex Bowman	Hendrick Motorsports	Chevrolet
51	Cody Ware	Rick Ware Racing	Chevrolet
54	Ty Gibbs (CC)	Joe Gibbs Racing	Toyota
60	Ryan Preece (CC)	RFK Racing	Ford
66	Josh Bilicki (i)	Garage 66	Ford
71	Michael McDowell	Spire Motorsports	Chevrolet
77	Carson Hocevar (CC)	Spire Motorsports	Chevrolet
88	Connor Zilisch (R)	Trackhouse Racing	Chevrolet
97	Shane van Gisbergen	Trackhouse Racing	Chevrolet
Official entry list

== Practice ==
The practice session was canceled due to inclement weather.

== Qualifying ==
Qualifying for the race was canceled due to inclement weather. Kyle Larson was awarded the pole for the race as a result of NASCAR's pandemic formula with a score of 3.000.

=== Starting lineup ===
Pos	No.	Driver	Team	Manufacturer
1	5	Kyle Larson (CC)	Hendrick Motorsports	Chevrolet
2	22	Joey Logano (CC)	Team Penske	Ford
3	11	Denny Hamlin (CC)	Joe Gibbs Racing	Toyota
4	24	William Byron (CC)	Hendrick Motorsports	Chevrolet
5	77	Carson Hocevar (CC)	Spire Motorsports	Chevrolet
6	48	Alex Bowman	Hendrick Motorsports	Chevrolet
7	1	Ross Chastain	Trackhouse Racing	Chevrolet
8	2	Austin Cindric (CC)	Team Penske	Ford
9	3	Austin Dillon	Richard Childress Racing	Chevrolet
10	23	Bubba Wallace (CC)	23XI Racing	Toyota
11	6	Brad Keselowski	RFK Racing	Ford
12	20	Christopher Bell (CC)	Joe Gibbs Racing	Toyota
13	54	Ty Gibbs (CC)	Joe Gibbs Racing	Toyota
14	43	Erik Jones	Legacy Motor Club	Toyota
15	88	Connor Zilisch (R)	Trackhouse Racing	Chevrolet
16	60	Ryan Preece (CC)	RFK Racing	Ford
17	41	Cole Custer	Haas Factory Team	Ford
18	16	A. J. Allmendinger	Kaulig Racing	Chevrolet
19	42	John Hunter Nemechek	Legacy Motor Club	Toyota
20	45	Tyler Reddick (CC)	23XI Racing	Toyota
21	71	Michael McDowell	Spire Motorsports	Chevrolet
22	97	Shane van Gisbergen	Trackhouse Racing	Chevrolet
23	17	Chris Buescher (CC)	RFK Racing	Ford
24	34	Todd Gilliland	Front Row Motorsports	Ford
25	33	Austin Hill (i)	Richard Childress Racing	Chevrolet
26	19	Chase Briscoe (CC)	Joe Gibbs Racing	Toyota
27	9	Chase Elliott (CC)	Hendrick Motorsports	Chevrolet
28	7	Daniel Suárez (CC)	Spire Motorsports	Chevrolet
29	12	Ryan Blaney (CC)	Team Penske	Ford
30	51	Cody Ware	Rick Ware Racing	Chevrolet
31	47	Ricky Stenhouse Jr.	Hyak Motorsports	Chevrolet
32	21	Josh Berry	Wood Brothers Racing	Ford
33	10	Ty Dillon	Kaulig Racing	Chevrolet
34	35	Riley Herbst	23XI Racing	Toyota
35	38	Zane Smith	Front Row Motorsports	Ford
36	4	Noah Gragson	Front Row Motorsports	Ford
37	66	Josh Bilicki (i)	Garage 66	Ford
Official starting lineup

== Race ==
=== Race results ===
==== Stage results ====
Stage One Laps: 125

Pos	No	Driver	Team	Manufacturer	Points
1	22	Joey Logano (CC)	Team Penske	Ford	10
2	5	Kyle Larson (CC)	Hendrick Motorsports	Chevrolet	9
3	11	Denny Hamlin (CC)	Joe Gibbs Racing	Toyota	8
4	1	Ross Chastain	Trackhouse Racing	Chevrolet	7
5	54	Ty Gibbs (CC)	Joe Gibbs Racing	Toyota	6
6	12	Ryan Blaney (CC)	Team Penske	Ford	5
7	2	Austin Cindric (CC)	Team Penske	Ford	4
8	77	Carson Hocevar (CC)	Spire Motorsports	Chevrolet	3
9	6	Brad Keselowski	RFK Racing	Ford	2
10	23	Bubba Wallace (CC)	23XI Racing	Toyota	1

Stage Two Laps: 125

Pos	No	Driver	Team	Manufacturer	Points
1	12	Ryan Blaney (CC)	Team Penske	Ford	10
2	54	Ty Gibbs (CC)	Joe Gibbs Racing	Toyota	9
3	22	Joey Logano (CC)	Team Penske	Ford	8
4	21	Josh Berry	Wood Brothers Racing	Ford	7
5	20	Christopher Bell (CC)	Joe Gibbs Racing	Toyota	6
6	23	Bubba Wallace (CC)	23XI Racing	Toyota	5
7	77	Carson Hocevar (CC)	Spire Motorsports	Chevrolet	4
8	24	William Byron (CC)	Hendrick Motorsports	Chevrolet	3
9	5	Kyle Larson (CC)	Hendrick Motorsports	Chevrolet	2
10	17	Chris Buescher (CC)	RFK Racing	Ford	1

=== Final Stage results ===
Stage Three Laps: 250

Pos	Grid	No	Driver	Team	Manufacturer	Laps	Points
1	2	22	Joey Logano (CC)	Team Penske	Ford	500	73
2	1	5	Kyle Larson (CC)	Hendrick Motorsports	Chevrolet	500	47
3	5	77	Carson Hocevar (CC)	Spire Motorsports	Chevrolet	500	41
4	12	20	Christopher Bell (CC)	Joe Gibbs Racing	Toyota	500	39
5	13	54	Ty Gibbs (CC)	Joe Gibbs Racing	Toyota	500	47
6	32	21	Josh Berry	Wood Brothers Racing	Ford	500	38
7	10	23	Bubba Wallace (CC)	23XI Racing	Toyota	500	36
8	3	11	Denny Hamlin (CC)	Joe Gibbs Racing	Toyota	500	37
9	4	24	William Byron (CC)	Hendrick Motorsports	Chevrolet	500	31
10	16	60	Ryan Preece (CC)	RFK Racing	Ford	500	27
11	8	2	Austin Cindric (CC)	Team Penske	Ford	500	30
12	7	1	Ross Chastain	Trackhouse Racing	Chevrolet	500	32
13	23	17	Chris Buescher (CC)	RFK Racing	Ford	499	25
14	28	7	Daniel Suárez (CC)	Spire Motorsports	Chevrolet	498	23
15	11	6	Brad Keselowski	RFK Racing	Ford	498	24
16	36	4	Noah Gragson	Front Row Motorsports	Ford	498	21
17	9	3	Austin Dillon	Richard Childress Racing	Chevrolet	498	20
18	20	45	Tyler Reddick (CC)	23XI Racing	Toyota	497	19
19	24	34	Todd Gilliland	Front Row Motorsports	Ford	497	18
20	22	97	Shane van Gisbergen	Trackhouse Racing	Chevrolet	497	17
21	21	71	Michael McDowell	Spire Motorsports	Chevrolet	497	16
22	18	16	A. J. Allmendinger	Kaulig Racing	Chevrolet	497	15
23	27	9	Chase Elliott (CC)	Hendrick Motorsports	Chevrolet	497	14
24	15	88	Connor Zilisch (R)	Trackhouse Racing	Chevrolet	496	13
25	19	42	John Hunter Nemechek	Legacy Motor Club	Toyota	495	12
26	17	41	Cole Custer	Haas Factory Team	Chevrolet	495	11
27	26	19	Chase Briscoe (CC)	Joe Gibbs Racing	Toyota	494	10
28	35	38	Zane Smith	Front Row Motorsports	Ford	494	9
29	25	33	Austin Hill (i)	Richard Childress Racing	Chevrolet	494	0
30	31	47	Ricky Stenhouse Jr.	Hyak Motorsports	Chevrolet	490	7
31	30	51	Cody Ware	Rick Ware Racing	Chevrolet	489	6
32	14	43	Erik Jones	Legacy Motor Club	Toyota	483	5
33	29	12	Ryan Blaney (CC)	Team Penske	Ford	457	19
34	34	35	Riley Herbst	23XI Racing	Toyota	432	3
35	6	48	Alex Bowman	Hendrick Motorsports	Chevrolet	428	2
36	33	10	Ty Dillon	Kaulig Racing	Chevrolet	402	1
37	37	66	Josh Bilicki (i)	Garage 66	Ford	338	0
Official race results

=== Race statistics ===
- Lead changes: 13 among 6 different drivers
- Cautions/Laps: 10 for 78
- Red flags: 0
- Time of race: 3 hours, 2 minutes, and 20 seconds
- Average speed: 87.697 miles per hour (141.135 km/h)

== Media ==
=== Television ===
USA Sports covered the race on the television side. Leigh Diffey, Jeff Burton and Steve Letarte called the race from the broadcast booth. Dave Burns, Kim Coon, Marty Snider and Trevor Bayne handled reports from pit road for the television side.

USA
Booth announcers	Pit reporters
Lap-by-lap: Leigh Diffey; Color-commentator: Jeff Burton; Color-commentator: Steve Letarte	Dave Burns; Kim Coon; Marty Snider; Trevor Bayne

=== Radio ===
PRN had the radio call for the race, which was also simulcast on Sirius XM NASCAR Radio. Brad Gillie and Nick Yeoman called the race from the booth when the field races down the frontstretch. Pat Patterson called the race when the field races down the backstretch. Pit road was operated by Andrew Kurland, Brett McMillan, Heather DeBeaux and Wendy Venturini.

PRN
Booth announcers	Turn announcer	Pit reporters
Lead announcer: Brad Gillie; Announcer: Nick Yeoman	Backstretch: Pat Patterson	Andrew Kurland; Brett McMillan; Heather DeBeaux; Wendy Venturini

== Standings after the race ==
Drivers' Championship standings

	Pos	Driver	Points
1	1	Kyle Larson	2,206
1	2	Denny Hamlin	2,205 (–1)
3	3	Joey Logano	2,190 (–16)
1	4	Christopher Bell	2,189 (–17)
2	5	Ty Gibbs	2,164 (–42)
2	6	Ryan Blaney	2,154 (–52)
2	7	Tyler Reddick	2,145 (–61)
1	8	Carson Hocevar	2,121 (–85)
1	9	Chase Briscoe	2,119 (–87)
	10	Bubba Wallace	2,114 (–92)
1	11	Austin Cindric	2,090 (–116)
1	12	Chase Elliott	2,089 (–117)
2	13	William Byron	2,085 (–121)
	14	Ryan Preece	2,082 (–124)
2	15	Chris Buescher	2,082 (–124)
	16	Daniel Suárez	2,072 (–134)
Official driver's standings

Manufacturers' Championship standings

Pos	Manufacturer	Points
1	Toyota	1,290
2	Chevrolet	1,117 (–173)
3	Ford	1,087 (–203)

- Note: Only the first 16 positions are included for the driver standings.

Previous race: 2026 Enjoy Illinois 300	NASCAR Cup Series; 2026 season	Next race: 2026 Hollywood Casino 400
