= 2026 Hollywood Casino 400 =

NASCAR Cup Series race

Race details
- Race 30 of 36 in the 2026 NASCAR Cup Series
- Date: September 27, 2026
- Location: Kansas Speedway, Kansas City, Kansas
- Course: Permanent racing facility
- Course length: 1.5 miles (2.4 km)
- Distance: 267 laps, 400.5 mi (644.54 km)
- Average speed: 136.156 miles per hour (219.122 km/h)

Pole position
| Driver | Joey Logano | Team Penske |
- Grid positions set by competition-based formula

Most laps led
| Driver | Kyle Larson | Hendrick Motorsports |
- Laps: 235

Fastest lap
| Driver | Kyle Larson | Hendrick Motorsports |
- Time: 30.076

Winner
| No. 5 | Kyle Larson | Hendrick Motorsports |

Television in the United States
- Network: USA
- Announcers: Leigh Diffey, Jeff Burton and Steve Letarte
- Nielsen ratings: 0.82 (1.464 million)

Radio in the United States
- Radio: MRN
- Booth announcers: Alex Hayden, Mike Bagley, and Todd Gordon
- Turn announcers: Dave Moody (1 & 2) and Tim Catalfamo (3 & 4)

The 2026 Hollywood Casino 400 was a NASCAR Cup Series race held on September 27, 2026, at Kansas Speedway in Kansas City, Kansas on the 1.5-mile (2.4 km) asphalt oval, it was the 30th race of the 2026 NASCAR Cup Series season, and the fourth race of the NASCAR Chase.

Kyle Larson won all stages and the race, and also became the first driver to score the maximum points possible in one weekend since the bonus point for the fastest lap was reintroduced in 2025. Austin Cindric finished 2nd, and Denny Hamlin finished 3rd. Chase Briscoe and Ryan Blaney rounded out the top five, and Christopher Bell, William Byron, Chase Elliott, Bubba Wallace, and Ryan Preece rounded out the top ten.

== Report ==
=== Background ===
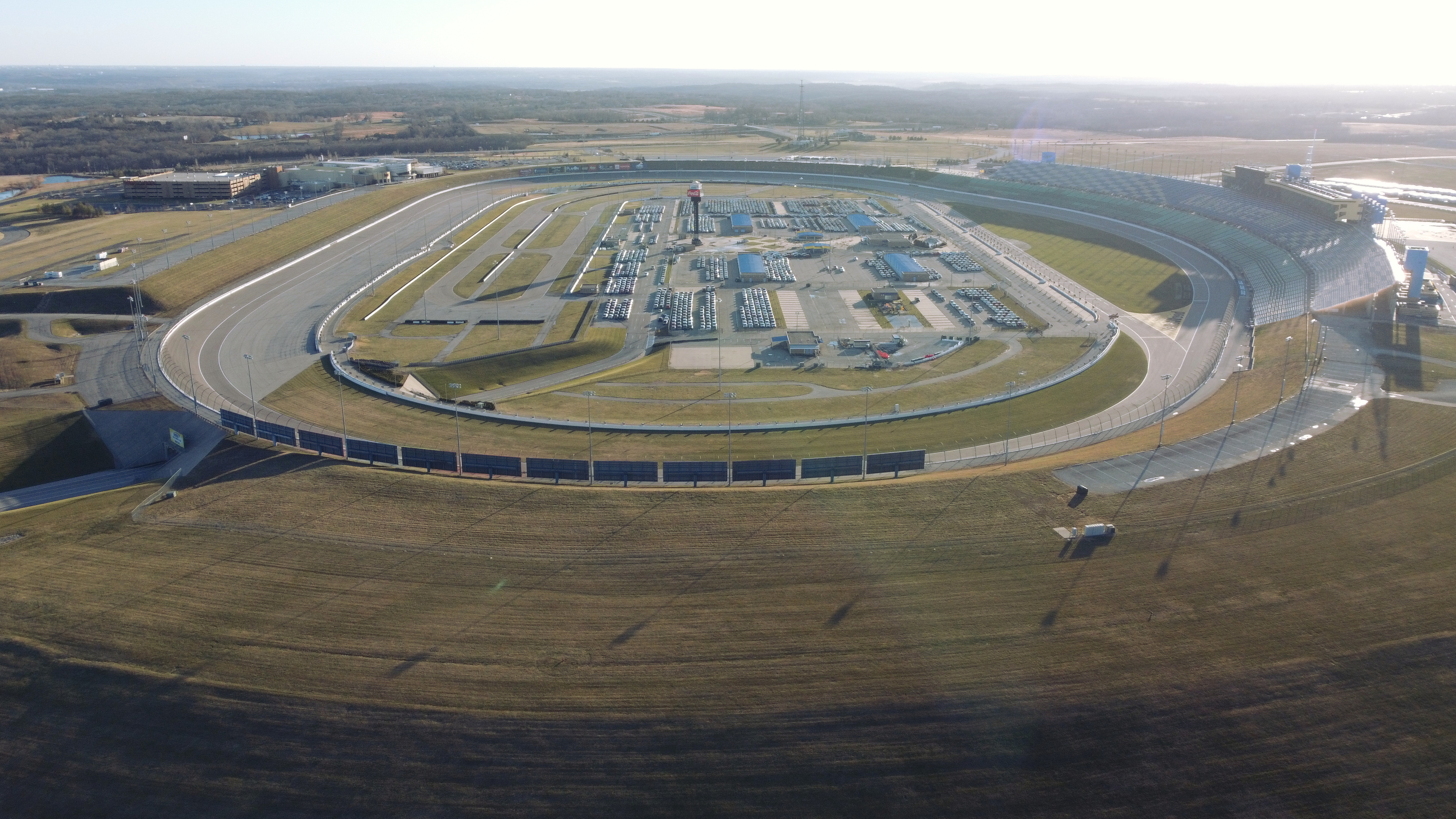
The layout of Kansas Speedway, the venue where the race is going to be.

Kansas Speedway is a 1.5-mile (2.4 km) tri-oval race track in Kansas City, Kansas. It was built in 2001 and hosts two annual NASCAR race weekends. The NTT IndyCar Series raced at the speedway 2001 until 2011. The speedway is currently owned and operated by NASCAR.

==== Entry list ====
- (R) denotes rookie driver.
- (i) denotes driver who is ineligible for series driver points.
- (CC) denotes chase contender.

| No. | Driver | Team | Manufacturer |
|---|---|---|---|
| 1 | Ross Chastain | Trackhouse Racing | Chevrolet |
| 2 | Austin Cindric (CC) | Team Penske | Ford |
| 3 | Austin Dillon | Richard Childress Racing | Chevrolet |
| 4 | Noah Gragson | Front Row Motorsports | Ford |
| 5 | Kyle Larson (CC) | Hendrick Motorsports | Chevrolet |
| 6 | Brad Keselowski | RFK Racing | Ford |
| 7 | Daniel Suárez (CC) | Spire Motorsports | Chevrolet |
| 9 | Chase Elliott (CC) | Hendrick Motorsports | Chevrolet |
| 10 | Ty Dillon | Kaulig Racing | Chevrolet |
| 11 | Denny Hamlin (CC) | Joe Gibbs Racing | Toyota |
| 12 | Ryan Blaney (CC) | Team Penske | Ford |
| 16 | A. J. Allmendinger | Kaulig Racing | Chevrolet |
| 17 | Chris Buescher (CC) | RFK Racing | Ford |
| 19 | Chase Briscoe (CC) | Joe Gibbs Racing | Toyota |
| 20 | Christopher Bell (CC) | Joe Gibbs Racing | Toyota |
| 21 | Josh Berry | Wood Brothers Racing | Ford |
| 22 | Joey Logano (CC) | Team Penske | Ford |
| 23 | Bubba Wallace (CC) | 23XI Racing | Toyota |
| 24 | William Byron (CC) | Hendrick Motorsports | Chevrolet |
| 33 | Austin Hill (i) | Richard Childress Racing | Chevrolet |
| 34 | Todd Gilliland | Front Row Motorsports | Ford |
| 35 | Riley Herbst | 23XI Racing | Toyota |
| 38 | Zane Smith | Front Row Motorsports | Ford |
| 41 | Cole Custer | Haas Factory Team | Ford |
| 42 | John Hunter Nemechek | Legacy Motor Club | Toyota |
| 43 | Erik Jones | Legacy Motor Club | Toyota |
| 45 | Tyler Reddick (CC) | 23XI Racing | Toyota |
| 47 | Ricky Stenhouse Jr. | Hyak Motorsports | Chevrolet |
| 48 | Alex Bowman | Hendrick Motorsports | Chevrolet |
| 51 | Cody Ware | Rick Ware Racing | Chevrolet |
| 54 | Ty Gibbs (CC) | Joe Gibbs Racing | Toyota |
| 60 | Ryan Preece (CC) | RFK Racing | Ford |
| 71 | Michael McDowell | Spire Motorsports | Chevrolet |
| 77 | Carson Hocevar (CC) | Spire Motorsports | Chevrolet |
| 88 | Connor Zilisch (R) | Trackhouse Racing | Chevrolet |
| 97 | Shane van Gisbergen | Trackhouse Racing | Chevrolet |
Official entry list

== Starting lineup ==
Practice and qualifying for the race was canceled due to inclement weather. Joey Logano was awarded the pole for the race as a result of NASCAR's pandemic formula with a score of 1.600.

=== Starting lineup ===
| Pos | No. | Driver | Team | Manufacturer |
|---|---|---|---|---|
| 1 | 22 | Joey Logano (CC) | Team Penske | Ford |
| 2 | 5 | Kyle Larson (CC) | Hendrick Motorsports | Chevrolet |
| 3 | 20 | Christopher Bell (CC) | Joe Gibbs Racing | Toyota |
| 4 | 77 | Carson Hocevar (CC) | Spire Motorsports | Chevrolet |
| 5 | 54 | Ty Gibbs (CC) | Joe Gibbs Racing | Toyota |
| 6 | 11 | Denny Hamlin (CC) | Joe Gibbs Racing | Toyota |
| 7 | 23 | Bubba Wallace (CC) | 23XI Racing | Toyota |
| 8 | 24 | William Byron (CC) | Hendrick Motorsports | Chevrolet |
| 9 | 60 | Ryan Preece (CC) | RFK Racing | Ford |
| 10 | 21 | Josh Berry | Wood Brothers Racing | Ford |
| 11 | 2 | Austin Cindric (CC) | Team Penske | Ford |
| 12 | 17 | Chris Buescher (CC) | RFK Racing | Ford |
| 13 | 1 | Ross Chastain | Trackhouse Racing | Chevrolet |
| 14 | 7 | Daniel Suárez (CC) | Spire Motorsports | Chevrolet |
| 15 | 45 | Tyler Reddick (CC) | 23XI Racing | Toyota |
| 16 | 6 | Brad Keselowski | RFK Racing | Ford |
| 17 | 97 | Shane van Gisbergen | Trackhouse Racing | Chevrolet |
| 18 | 9 | Chase Elliott (CC) | Hendrick Motorsports | Chevrolet |
| 19 | 3 | Austin Dillon | Richard Childress Racing | Chevrolet |
| 20 | 34 | Todd Gilliland | Front Row Motorsports | Ford |
| 21 | 4 | Noah Gragson | Front Row Motorsports | Ford |
| 22 | 71 | Michael McDowell | Spire Motorsports | Chevrolet |
| 23 | 19 | Chase Briscoe (CC) | Joe Gibbs Racing | Toyota |
| 24 | 16 | A. J. Allmendinger | Kaulig Racing | Chevrolet |
| 25 | 12 | Ryan Blaney (CC) | Team Penske | Ford |
| 26 | 42 | John Hunter Nemechek | Legacy Motor Club | Toyota |
| 27 | 88 | Connor Zilisch (R) | Trackhouse Racing | Chevrolet |
| 28 | 38 | Zane Smith | Front Row Motorsports | Ford |
| 29 | 41 | Cole Custer | Haas Factory Team | Ford |
| 30 | 43 | Erik Jones | Legacy Motor Club | Toyota |
| 31 | 47 | Ricky Stenhouse Jr. | Hyak Motorsports | Chevrolet |
| 32 | 33 | Austin Hill (i) | Richard Childress Racing | Chevrolet |
| 33 | 48 | Alex Bowman | Hendrick Motorsports | Chevrolet |
| 34 | 35 | Riley Herbst | 23XI Racing | Toyota |
| 35 | 51 | Cody Ware | Rick Ware Racing | Chevrolet |
| 36 | 10 | Ty Dillon | Kaulig Racing | Chevrolet |
Official starting lineup

== Race ==
=== Race results ===
==== Stage results ====
Stage One Laps: 80

| Pos | No | Driver | Team | Manufacturer | Points |
|---|---|---|---|---|---|
| 1 | 5 | Kyle Larson (CC) | Hendrick Motorsports | Chevrolet | 10 |
| 2 | 11 | Denny Hamlin (CC) | Joe Gibbs Racing | Toyota | 9 |
| 3 | 2 | Austin Cindric (CC) | Team Penske | Ford | 8 |
| 4 | 77 | Carson Hocevar (CC) | Spire Motorsports | Chevrolet | 7 |
| 5 | 20 | Christopher Bell (CC) | Joe Gibbs Racing | Toyota | 6 |
| 6 | 22 | Joey Logano (CC) | Team Penske | Ford | 5 |
| 7 | 24 | William Byron (CC) | Hendrick Motorsports | Chevrolet | 4 |
| 8 | 9 | Chase Elliott (CC) | Hendrick Motorsports | Chevrolet | 3 |
| 9 | 54 | Ty Gibbs (CC) | Joe Gibbs Racing | Toyota | 2 |
| 10 | 12 | Ryan Blaney (CC) | Team Penske | Ford | 1 |

Stage Two Laps: 85

| Pos | No | Driver | Team | Manufacturer | Points |
|---|---|---|---|---|---|
| 1 | 5 | Kyle Larson (CC) | Hendrick Motorsports | Chevrolet | 10 |
| 2 | 2 | Austin Cindric (CC) | Team Penske | Ford | 9 |
| 3 | 11 | Denny Hamlin (CC) | Joe Gibbs Racing | Toyota | 8 |
| 4 | 19 | Chase Briscoe (CC) | Joe Gibbs Racing | Toyota | 7 |
| 5 | 20 | Christopher Bell (CC) | Joe Gibbs Racing | Toyota | 6 |
| 6 | 24 | William Byron (CC) | Hendrick Motorsports | Chevrolet | 5 |
| 7 | 12 | Ryan Blaney (CC) | Team Penske | Ford | 4 |
| 8 | 22 | Joey Logano (CC) | Team Penske | Ford | 3 |
| 9 | 54 | Ty Gibbs (CC) | Joe Gibbs Racing | Toyota | 2 |
| 10 | 6 | Brad Keselowski | RFK Racing | Ford | 1 |

=== Final Stage results ===
Stage Three Laps: 102

| Pos | Grid | No | Driver | Team | Manufacturer | Laps | Points |
|---|---|---|---|---|---|---|---|
| 1 | 2 | 5 | Kyle Larson (CC) | Hendrick Motorsports | Chevrolet | 267 | 76 |
| 2 | 11 | 2 | Austin Cindric (CC) | Team Penske | Ford | 267 | 52 |
| 3 | 6 | 11 | Denny Hamlin (CC) | Joe Gibbs Racing | Toyota | 267 | 51 |
| 4 | 23 | 19 | Chase Briscoe (CC) | Joe Gibbs Racing | Toyota | 267 | 40 |
| 5 | 25 | 12 | Ryan Blaney (CC) | Team Penske | Ford | 267 | 37 |
| 6 | 3 | 20 | Christopher Bell (CC) | Joe Gibbs Racing | Toyota | 267 | 43 |
| 7 | 8 | 24 | William Byron (CC) | Hendrick Motorsports | Chevrolet | 267 | 39 |
| 8 | 18 | 9 | Chase Elliott (CC) | Hendrick Motorsports | Chevrolet | 267 | 32 |
| 9 | 7 | 23 | Bubba Wallace (CC) | 23XI Racing | Toyota | 267 | 28 |
| 10 | 9 | 60 | Ryan Preece (CC) | RFK Racing | Ford | 267 | 27 |
| 11 | 15 | 45 | Tyler Reddick (CC) | 23XI Racing | Toyota | 267 | 26 |
| 12 | 16 | 6 | Brad Keselowski | RFK Racing | Ford | 267 | 26 |
| 13 | 26 | 42 | John Hunter Nemechek | Legacy Motor Club | Toyota | 267 | 24 |
| 14 | 14 | 7 | Daniel Suárez (CC) | Spire Motorsports | Chevrolet | 267 | 23 |
| 15 | 13 | 1 | Ross Chastain | Trackhouse Racing | Chevrolet | 267 | 22 |
| 16 | 30 | 43 | Erik Jones | Legacy Motor Club | Toyota | 267 | 21 |
| 17 | 5 | 54 | Ty Gibbs (CC) | Joe Gibbs Racing | Toyota | 267 | 24 |
| 18 | 33 | 48 | Alex Bowman | Hendrick Motorsports | Chevrolet | 267 | 19 |
| 19 | 20 | 34 | Todd Gilliland | Front Row Motorsports | Ford | 267 | 18 |
| 20 | 1 | 22 | Joey Logano (CC) | Team Penske | Ford | 267 | 25 |
| 21 | 19 | 3 | Austin Dillon | Richard Childress Racing | Chevrolet | 266 | 16 |
| 22 | 24 | 16 | A. J. Allmendinger | Kaulig Racing | Chevrolet | 266 | 15 |
| 23 | 12 | 17 | Chris Buescher (CC) | RFK Racing | Ford | 266 | 14 |
| 24 | 17 | 97 | Shane van Gisbergen | Trackhouse Racing | Chevrolet | 266 | 13 |
| 25 | 34 | 35 | Riley Herbst | 23XI Racing | Toyota | 266 | 12 |
| 26 | 32 | 33 | Austin Hill (i) | Richard Childress Racing | Chevrolet | 266 | 0 |
| 27 | 22 | 71 | Michael McDowell | Spire Motorsports | Chevrolet | 266 | 10 |
| 28 | 36 | 10 | Ty Dillon | Kaulig Racing | Chevrolet | 266 | 9 |
| 29 | 27 | 88 | Connor Zilisch (R) | Trackhouse Racing | Chevrolet | 266 | 8 |
| 30 | 29 | 41 | Cole Custer | Haas Factory Team | Chevrolet | 266 | 7 |
| 31 | 28 | 38 | Zane Smith | Front Row Motorsports | Ford | 266 | 6 |
| 32 | 31 | 47 | Ricky Stenhouse Jr. | Hyak Motorsports | Chevrolet | 266 | 5 |
| 33 | 4 | 77 | Carson Hocevar (CC) | Spire Motorsports | Chevrolet | 264 | 11 |
| 34 | 35 | 51 | Cody Ware | Rick Ware Racing | Chevrolet | 262 | 3 |
| 35 | 10 | 21 | Josh Berry | Wood Brothers Racing | Ford | 257 | 2 |
| 36 | 21 | 4 | Noah Gragson | Front Row Motorsports | Ford | 112 | 1 |
Official race results

=== Race statistics ===
- Lead changes: 13 among 7 different drivers
- Cautions/Laps: 5 for 26
- Red flags: 0
- Time of race: 2 hours, 52 minutes, and 41 seconds
- Average speed: 139.156 miles per hour (223.950 km/h)

== Media ==
=== Television ===
USA Sports covered the race on the television side. Leigh Diffey, Jeff Burton and Steve Letarte called the race from the broadcast booth. Dave Burns, Kim Coon, Marty Snider and Trevor Bayne handled pit road for the television side.

USA
| Booth announcers | Pit reporters |
|---|---|
| Lap-by-lap: Leigh Diffey; Color-commentator: Jeff Burton; Color-commentator: Steve Letarte | Dave Burns; Kim Coon; Marty Snider; Trevor Bayne |

=== Radio ===
MRN had the radio call for the race, which was also simulcast on Sirius XM NASCAR Radio. Alex Hayden, Mike Bagley, and former championship crew chief Todd Gordon called the action for MRN when the field races thru the front straightaway. Dave Moody called the action for MRN from atop the Sunoco tower outside the exit of turn 2 when the field races thru turns 1 & 2. Tim Catalfamo worked the action for MRN when the field races thru turns 3 & 4. Pit road was operated by lead pit reporter Steve Post, Brienne Pedigo, and Chris Wilner.

MRN
| Booth announcers | Turn announcers | Pit reporters |
|---|---|---|
| Lead announcer: Alex Hayden; Announcer: Mike Bagley; Announcer: Todd Gordon | Turns 1 & 2: Dave Moody; Turns 3 & 4: Tim Catalfamo | Steve Post; Brienne Pedigo; Chris Wilner |

== Standings after the race ==
Drivers' Championship standings

| | Pos | Driver | Points |
|---|---|---|---|
| | 1 | Kyle Larson | 2,282 |
| | 2 | Denny Hamlin | 2,256 (–26) |
| 1 | 3 | Christopher Bell | 2,232 (–50) |
| 1 | 4 | Joey Logano | 2,215 (–67) |
| 1 | 5 | Ryan Blaney | 2,191 (–91) |
| 1 | 6 | Ty Gibbs | 2,188 (–94) |
| | 7 | Tyler Reddick | 2,171 (–111) |
| 1 | 8 | Chase Briscoe | 2,159 (–123) |
| 2 | 9 | Austin Cindric | 2,142 (–140) |
| | 10 | Bubba Wallace | 2,142 (–140) |
| 3 | 11 | Carson Hocevar | 2,132 (–150) |
| 1 | 12 | William Byron | 2,124 (–158) |
| 1 | 13 | Chase Elliott | 2,121 (–161) |
| | 14 | Ryan Preece | 2,109 (–173) |
| | 15 | Chris Buescher | 2,096 (–186) |
| | 16 | Daniel Suárez | 2,095 (–187) |
Official driver's standings

Manufacturers' Championship standings

| Pos | Manufacturer | Points |
|---|---|---|
| 1 | Toyota | 1,324 |
| 2 | Chevrolet | 1,172 (–152) |
| 3 | Ford | 1,122 (–202) |

- Note: Only the first 16 positions are included for the driver standings.

| Previous race: 2026 Bass Pro Shops Night Race | NASCAR Cup Series; 2026 season | Next race: 2026 South Point 400 |
