= 2024 Autotrader EchoPark Automotive 400 =

NASCAR Cup Series race

Race details
- Race 9 of 36 in the 2024 NASCAR Cup Series
- Date: April 14, 2024
- Location: Texas Motor Speedway in Fort Worth, Texas
- Course: Permanent racing facility
- Course length: 1.5 miles (2.4 km)
- Distance: 276 laps, 414 mi (662.4 km)
- Scheduled distance: 267 laps, 400.5 mi (640.8 km)
- Average speed: 116.492 miles per hour (187.476 km/h)

Pole position
Driver	Kyle Larson	Hendrick Motorsports
- Time: 28.366

Most laps led
Driver	Kyle Larson	Hendrick Motorsports
- Laps: 77

Winner
No. 9	Chase Elliott	Hendrick Motorsports

Television in the United States
- Network: FS1
- Announcers: Mike Joy, Clint Bowyer, and Kevin Harvick

Radio in the United States
- Radio: PRN
- Booth announcers: Doug Rice and Mark Garrow
- Turn announcers: Rob Albright (1 & 2) and Pat Patterson (3 & 4)

The 2024 Autotrader EchoPark Automotive 400 was a NASCAR Cup Series race held on April 14, 2024, at Texas Motor Speedway in Fort Worth, Texas. Contested over 276 laps—extended from 267 laps due to a double overtime finish, on the 1.5 mile (2.4 km) intermediate quad-oval, it was the ninth race of the 2024 NASCAR Cup Series season. Chase Elliott won the race, his first of the season, and 19th of his career. This win also snapped a 42-race winless streak for Elliott dating back to the 2022 YellaWood 500 in October 2022 at Talladega Superspeedway.

== Report ==
=== Background ===
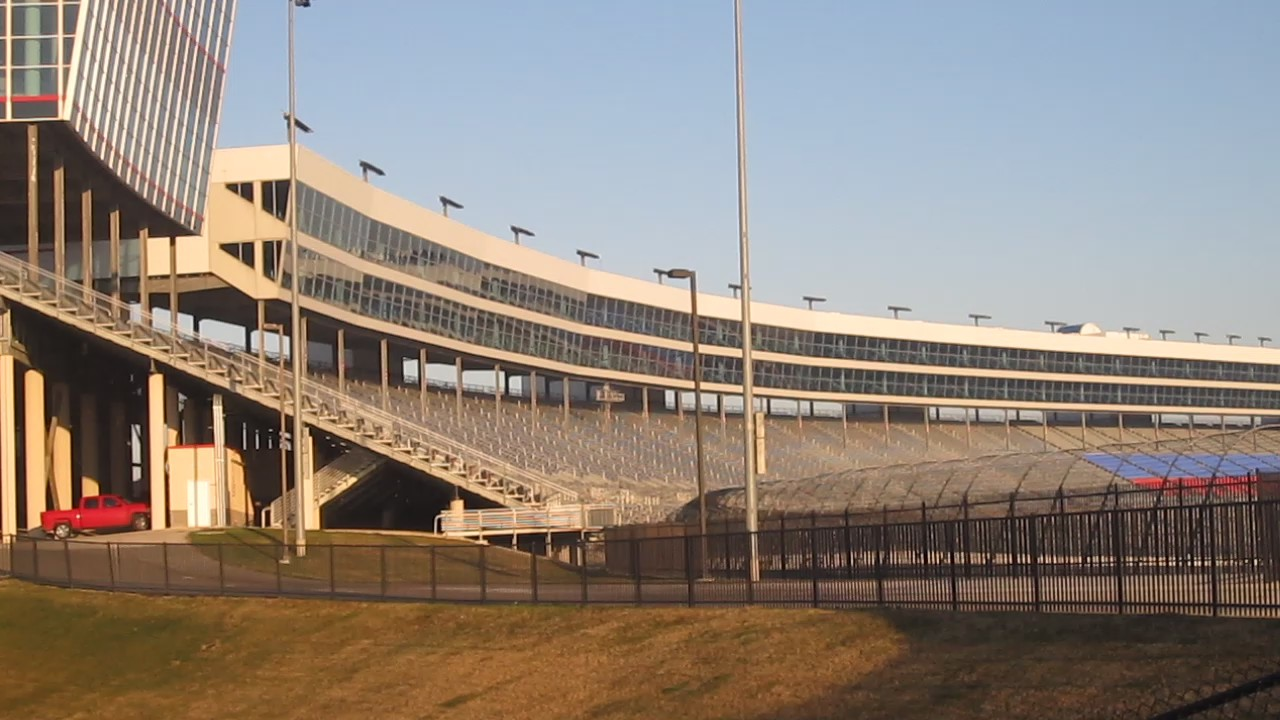
Texas Motor Speedway, the track where the race will be held.

Texas Motor Speedway is a speedway located in the northernmost portion of the U.S. city of Fort Worth, Texas – the portion located in Denton County, Texas. The track measures 1.5 miles (2.4 km) around and is banked 24 degrees in the turns, and is of the oval design, where the front straightaway juts outward slightly. The track layout is similar to Atlanta Motor Speedway and Charlotte Motor Speedway (formerly Lowe's Motor Speedway). The track is owned by Speedway Motorsports, Inc., the same company that owns Atlanta and Charlotte Motor Speedway, as well as the short-track Bristol Motor Speedway.

==== Entry list ====
- (R) denotes rookie driver.
- (i) denotes driver who is ineligible for series driver points.

No.	Driver	Team	Manufacturer
1	Ross Chastain	Trackhouse Racing	Chevrolet
2	Austin Cindric	Team Penske	Ford
3	Austin Dillon	Richard Childress Racing	Chevrolet
4	Josh Berry (R)	Stewart–Haas Racing	Ford
5	Kyle Larson	Hendrick Motorsports	Chevrolet
6	Brad Keselowski	RFK Racing	Ford
7	Corey LaJoie	Spire Motorsports	Chevrolet
8	Kyle Busch	Richard Childress Racing	Chevrolet
9	Chase Elliott	Hendrick Motorsports	Chevrolet
10	Noah Gragson	Stewart–Haas Racing	Ford
11	Denny Hamlin	Joe Gibbs Racing	Toyota
12	Ryan Blaney	Team Penske	Ford
14	Chase Briscoe	Stewart–Haas Racing	Ford
15	Kaz Grala (R)	Rick Ware Racing	Ford
16	Ty Dillon (i)	Kaulig Racing	Chevrolet
17	Chris Buescher	RFK Racing	Ford
19	Martin Truex Jr.	Joe Gibbs Racing	Toyota
20	Christopher Bell	Joe Gibbs Racing	Toyota
21	Harrison Burton	Wood Brothers Racing	Ford
22	Joey Logano	Team Penske	Ford
23	Bubba Wallace	23XI Racing	Toyota
24	William Byron	Hendrick Motorsports	Chevrolet
31	Daniel Hemric	Kaulig Racing	Chevrolet
33	Austin Hill (i)	Richard Childress Racing	Chevrolet
34	Michael McDowell	Front Row Motorsports	Ford
38	Todd Gilliland	Front Row Motorsports	Ford
41	Ryan Preece	Stewart–Haas Racing	Ford
42	John Hunter Nemechek	Legacy Motor Club	Toyota
43	Erik Jones	Legacy Motor Club	Toyota
45	Tyler Reddick	23XI Racing	Toyota
47	Ricky Stenhouse Jr.	JTG Daugherty Racing	Chevrolet
48	Alex Bowman	Hendrick Motorsports	Chevrolet
51	Justin Haley	Rick Ware Racing	Ford
54	Ty Gibbs	Joe Gibbs Racing	Toyota
71	Zane Smith (R)	Spire Motorsports	Chevrolet
77	Carson Hocevar (R)	Spire Motorsports	Chevrolet
84	Jimmie Johnson	Legacy Motor Club	Toyota
99	Daniel Suárez	Trackhouse Racing	Chevrolet
Official entry list

== Practice ==
Ty Gibbs was the fastest in the practice session with a time of 28.345 seconds and a speed of 190.510 mph (306.596 km/h).

=== Practice results ===
Pos	No.	Driver	Team	Manufacturer	Time	Speed
1	54	Ty Gibbs	Joe Gibbs Racing	Toyota	28.345	190.510
2	6	Brad Keselowski	RFK Racing	Ford	28.553	189.122
3	5	Kyle Larson	Hendrick Motorsports	Chevrolet	28.560	189.076
Official practice results

== Qualifying ==
Kyle Larson scored the pole for the race with a time of 28.366 and a speed of 190.369 mph (306.369 km/h).

=== Qualifying results ===
Pos	No.	Driver	Team	Manufacturer	R1	R2
1	5	Kyle Larson	Hendrick Motorsports	Chevrolet	28.338	28.366
2	54	Ty Gibbs	Joe Gibbs Racing	Toyota	28.409	28.401
3	20	Christopher Bell	Joe Gibbs Racing	Toyota	28.502	28.417
4	45	Tyler Reddick	23XI Racing	Toyota	28.357	28.450
5	14	Chase Briscoe	Stewart-Haas Racing	Ford	28.373	28.458
6	24	William Byron	Hendrick Motorsports	Chevrolet	28.385	28.464
7	12	Ryan Blaney	Team Penske	Ford	28.461	28.480
8	2	Austin Cindric	Team Penske	Ford	28.522	28.482
9	19	Martin Truex Jr.	Joe Gibbs Racing	Toyota	28.441	28.528
10	23	Bubba Wallace	23XI Racing	Toyota	28.424	28.682
11	11	Denny Hamlin	Joe Gibbs Racing	Toyota	28.499	—
12	1	Ross Chastain	Trackhouse Racing	Chevrolet	28.542	—
13	34	Michael McDowell	Front Row Motorsports	Ford	28.501	—
14	48	Alex Bowman	Hendrick Motorsports	Chevrolet	28.565	—
15	3	Austin Dillon	Richard Childress Racing	Chevrolet	28.511	—
16	77	Carson Hocevar (R)	Spire Motorsports	Chevrolet	28.572	—
17	99	Daniel Suárez	Trackhouse Racing	Chevrolet	28.521	—
18	71	Zane Smith (R)	Spire Motorsports	Chevrolet	28.634	—
19	17	Chris Buescher	RFK Racing	Ford	28.522	—
20	22	Joey Logano	Team Penske	Ford	28.642	—
21	10	Noah Gragson	Stewart-Haas Racing	Ford	28.549	—
22	6	Brad Keselowski	RFK Racing	Ford	28.728	—
23	7	Corey LaJoie	Spire Motorsports	Chevrolet	28.653	—
24	9	Chase Elliott	Hendrick Motorsports	Chevrolet	28.742	—
25	4	Josh Berry (R)	Stewart-Haas Racing	Ford	28.679	—
26	41	Ryan Preece	Stewart-Haas Racing	Ford	28.776	—
27	43	Erik Jones	Legacy Motor Club	Toyota	28.689	—
28	38	Todd Gilliland	Front Row Motorsports	Ford	28.867	—
29	21	Harrison Burton	Wood Brothers Racing	Ford	28.739	—
30	42	John Hunter Nemechek	Legacy Motor Club	Toyota	28.937	—
31	47	Ricky Stenhouse Jr.	JTG Daugherty Racing	Chevrolet	28.775	—
32	51	Justin Haley	Rick Ware Racing	Ford	28.954	—
33	15	Kaz Grala (R)	Rick Ware Racing	Ford	28.916	—
34	33	Austin Hill (i)	Richard Childress Racing	Chevrolet	28.972	—
35	8	Kyle Busch	Richard Childress Racing	Chevrolet	0.000	—
36	16	Ty Dillon (i)	Kaulig Racing	Chevrolet	29.019	—
37	84	Jimmie Johnson	Legacy Motor Club	Toyota	0.000	—
38	31	Daniel Hemric	Kaulig Racing	Chevrolet	29.107	—
Official qualifying results

== Race ==
=== Race results ===
==== Stage Results ====
Stage One Laps: 80

Pos	No	Driver	Team	Manufacturer	Points
1	5	Kyle Larson	Hendrick Motorsports	Chevrolet	10
2	20	Christopher Bell	Joe Gibbs Racing	Toyota	9
3	11	Denny Hamlin	Joe Gibbs Racing	Toyota	8
4	45	Tyler Reddick	23XI Racing	Toyota	7
5	14	Chase Briscoe	Stewart-Haas Racing	Ford	6
6	12	Ryan Blaney	Team Penske	Ford	5
7	9	Chase Elliott	Hendrick Motorsports	Chevrolet	4
8	34	Michael McDowell	Front Row Motorsports	Ford	3
9	24	William Byron	Hendrick Motorsports	Chevrolet	2
10	23	Bubba Wallace	23XI Racing	Toyota	1
Official stage one results

Stage Two Laps: 85

Pos	No	Driver	Team	Manufacturer	Points
1	1	Ross Chastain	Trackhouse Racing	Chevrolet	10
2	23	Bubba Wallace	23XI Racing	Toyota	9
3	12	Ryan Blaney	Team Penske	Ford	8
4	43	Erik Jones	Legacy Motor Club	Toyota	7
5	14	Chase Briscoe	Stewart-Haas Racing	Ford	6
6	6	Brad Keselowski	RFK Racing	Ford	5
7	21	Harrison Burton	Wood Brothers Racing	Ford	4
8	47	Ricky Stenhouse Jr.	JTG Daugherty Racing	Chevrolet	3
9	54	Ty Gibbs	Joe Gibbs Racing	Toyota	2
10	9	Chase Elliott	Hendrick Motorsports	Chevrolet	1
Official stage two results

=== Final Stage Results ===
Stage Three Laps: 102

Pos	Grid	No	Driver	Team	Manufacturer	Laps	Points
1	24	9	Chase Elliott	Hendrick Motorsports	Chevrolet	276	45
2	22	6	Brad Keselowski	RFK Racing	Ford	276	40
3	6	24	William Byron	Hendrick Motorsports	Chevrolet	276	36
4	4	45	Tyler Reddick	23XI Racing	Toyota	276	40
5	17	99	Daniel Suárez	Trackhouse Racing	Chevrolet	276	32
6	5	14	Chase Briscoe	Stewart-Haas Racing	Ford	276	43
7	10	23	Bubba Wallace	23XI Racing	Toyota	276	40
8	15	3	Austin Dillon	Richard Childress Racing	Chevrolet	276	29
9	35	8	Kyle Busch	Richard Childress Racing	Chevrolet	276	28
10	16	77	Carson Hocevar (R)	Spire Motorsports	Chevrolet	276	27
11	20	22	Joey Logano	Team Penske	Ford	276	26
12	26	41	Ryan Preece	Stewart-Haas Racing	Ford	276	25
13	2	54	Ty Gibbs	Joe Gibbs Racing	Toyota	276	26
14	9	19	Martin Truex Jr.	Joe Gibbs Racing	Toyota	276	23
15	19	17	Chris Buescher	RFK Racing	Ford	276	22
16	36	16	Ty Dillon (i)	Kaulig Racing	Chevrolet	276	0
17	3	20	Christopher Bell	Joe Gibbs Racing	Toyota	276	29
18	21	10	Noah Gragson	Stewart-Haas Racing	Ford	276	19
19	27	43	Erik Jones	Legacy Motor Club	Toyota	276	25
20	38	31	Daniel Hemric	Kaulig Racing	Chevrolet	276	17
21	1	5	Kyle Larson	Hendrick Motorsports	Chevrolet	276	26
22	23	7	Corey LaJoie	Spire Motorsports	Chevrolet	276	15
23	31	47	Ricky Stenhouse Jr.	JTG Daugherty Racing	Chevrolet	276	17
24	32	51	Justin Haley	Rick Ware Racing	Ford	276	13
25	8	2	Austin Cindric	Team Penske	Ford	276	12
26	18	71	Zane Smith (R)	Spire Motorsports	Chevrolet	276	11
27	33	15	Kaz Grala (R)	Rick Ware Racing	Ford	276	10
28	29	21	Harrison Burton	Wood Brothers Racing	Ford	276	13
29	37	84	Jimmie Johnson	Legacy Motor Club	Toyota	276	8
30	11	11	Denny Hamlin	Joe Gibbs Racing	Toyota	276	15
31	28	38	Todd Gilliland	Front Row Motorsports	Ford	276	6
32	12	1	Ross Chastain	Trackhouse Racing	Chevrolet	275	15
33	7	12	Ryan Blaney	Team Penske	Ford	268	17
34	30	42	John Hunter Nemechek	Legacy Motor Club	Toyota	226	3
35	13	34	Michael McDowell	Front Row Motorsports	Ford	143	5
36	25	4	Josh Berry (R)	Stewart-Haas Racing	Ford	136	1
37	14	48	Alex Bowman	Hendrick Motorsports	Chevrolet	100	1
38	34	33	Austin Hill (i)	Richard Childress Racing	Chevrolet	98	0
Official race results

=== Race statistics ===
- Lead changes: 23 among 13 different drivers
- Cautions/Laps: 16 for 72 laps
- Red flags: 0
- Time of race: 3 hours, 33 minutes and 14 seconds
- Average speed: 116.492 miles per hour (187.476 km/h)

== Media ==
=== Television ===
Fox Sports covered the race on the television side Mike Joy, Clint Bowyer and three-time Texas winner Kevin Harvick called the race from the broadcast booth. Jamie Little and Regan Smith handled pit road for the television side, and Larry McReynolds provided insight from the Fox Sports studio in Charlotte.

FS1
Booth announcers	Pit reporters	In-race analyst
Lap-by-lap: Mike Joy; Color-commentator: Clint Bowyer; Color-commentator: Kevin Harvick	Jamie Little; Regan Smith	Larry McReynolds

=== Radio ===
PRN had the radio call for the race, which was also simulcast on Sirius XM NASCAR Radio. Doug Rice & Mark Garrow covered the action for PRN when the field races down the front straightaway. Rob Albright covered the action for PRN from a platform outside of Turns 1 & 2, & Pat Patterson covered the action from a platform outside of Turns 3 & 4 for PRN. Brad Gillie, Alan Cavanna and Wendy Venturini had the call from pit lane for PRN.

PRN
Booth announcers	Turn announcers	Pit reporters
Lead announcer: Doug Rice; Announcer: Mark Garrow	Turns 1 & 2: Rob Albright; Turns 3 & 4: Pat Patterson	Brad Gillie; Alan Cavanna; Wendy Venturini

== Standings after the race ==
Drivers' Championship standings

	Pos	Driver	Points
	1	Kyle Larson	336
	2	Martin Truex Jr.	318 (–18)
	3	Denny Hamlin	307 (–29)
2	4	Chase Elliott	303 (–33)
1	5	William Byron	297 (–39)
1	6	Ty Gibbs	280 (–56)
2	7	Ryan Blaney	278 (–58)
1	8	Tyler Reddick	269 (–67)
3	9	Bubba Wallace	255 (–81)
2	10	Ross Chastain	247 (–89)
	11	Christopher Bell	244 (–92)
4	12	Chase Briscoe	231 (–105)
3	13	Alex Bowman	228 (–108)
1	14	Chris Buescher	226 (–110)
1	15	Joey Logano	217 (–119)
1	16	Kyle Busch	217 (–119)
Official driver's standings

Manufacturers' Championship standings

Pos	Manufacturer	Points
1	Chevrolet	338
2	Toyota	322 (–16)
3	Ford	297 (–41)

- Note: Only the first 16 positions are included for the driver standings.

Previous race: 2024 Cook Out 400	NASCAR Cup Series; 2024 season	Next race: 2024 GEICO 500
