= Connor Zilisch =

American racing driver (born 2006)

- Zilisch at Las Vegas Motor Speedway in 2026
- Born: Connor Jackson Zilisch; July 22, 2006 (age 20); Charlotte, North Carolina, U.S.
- Achievements: 2025 NASCAR Xfinity Series Regular Season Champion; 2024 24 Hours of Daytona LMP2 Winner; 2024 12 Hours of Sebring LMP2 Winner; 2020 CIK-FIA Karting Academy Trophy Winner; 2021 Mazda MX-5 Cup Scholarship Winner; Records; O'Reilly Auto Parts Series: Tied with Sam Ard and Noah Gragson for most consecutive wins in NASCAR Xfinity Series history (4 in 2025); Most consecutive top-fives in NASCAR Xfinity Series history (18 in 2025); Karting: First American to win the CIK-FIA Karting Academy Trophy
- Awards: 2025 NASCAR Xfinity Series Rookie of the Year; 2022 Mazda MX-5 Cup Rookie of the Year

NASCAR Cup Series career
- 39 races run over 2 years
- Car no., team: No. 88 (Trackhouse Racing)
- 2026 position: 33rd
- Best finish: 33rd (2026)
- First race: 2025 EchoPark Automotive Grand Prix (Austin)
- Last race: 2026 Season Finale 400 (Homestead)
Wins	Top tens	Poles
0	2	0

NASCAR O'Reilly Auto Parts Series career
- 45 races run over 3 years
- 2026 position: 70th
- Best finish: 2nd (2025)
- First race: 2024 Mission 200 at The Glen (Watkins Glen)
- Last race: 2026 Cuervo 300 (Chicagoland)
- First win: 2024 Mission 200 at The Glen (Watkins Glen)
- Last win: 2026 Mission 200 at The Glen (Watkins Glen)
Wins	Top tens	Poles
13	33	10

NASCAR FedEx Freight Truck Series career
- 11 races run over 3 years
- 2026 position: 97th
- Best finish: 82nd (2024)
- First race: 2024 XPEL 225 (Austin)
- Last race: 2026 Team EJP 175 (New Hampshire)
Wins	Top tens	Poles
0	6	2

ARCA Menards Series career
- 9 races run over 2 years
- Best finish: 15th (2024)
- First race: 2023 General Tire 100 at The Glen (Watkins Glen)
- Last race: 2024 Reese's 150 (Kansas)
- First win: 2024 General Tire 150 (Dover)
- Last win: 2024 General Tire 100 at The Glen (Watkins Glen)
Wins	Top tens	Poles
5	8	2

ARCA Menards Series East career
- 8 races run over 1 year
- Best finish: 2nd (2024)
- First race: 2024 Pensacola 150 (Pensacola)
- Last race: 2024 Bush's Beans 200 (Bristol)
- First win: 2024 General Tire 150 (Dover)
- Last win: 2024 Circle City 200 (IRP)
Wins	Top tens	Poles
4	7	2

ARCA Menards Series West career
- 1 race run over 1 year
- Best finish: 37th (2024)
- First race: 2024 Desert Diamond Casino West Valley 100 (Phoenix)
- First win: 2024 Desert Diamond Casino West Valley 100 (Phoenix)
Wins	Top tens	Poles
1	1	0

IMSA SportsCar Championship career
- Debut season: 2024
- Current team: Cadillac Whelen
- Categorisation: FIA Silver (until 2025); FIA Gold (2026–)
- Car number: 31
- Former teams: Cadillac Racing, Trackhouse Racing w/ TF Sport
- Starts: 7
- Wins: 2
- Podiums: 5
- Poles: 0
- Fastest laps: 0
- Best finish: 14th in 2024
- Statistics up to date as of November 8, 2026.

Connor Jackson Zilisch (born July 22, 2006) is an American professional racing driver. He competes full-time in the NASCAR Cup Series, driving the No. 88 Chevrolet Camaro ZL1 for Trackhouse Racing.

After an early career in karts, culminating in winning the Karting Academy Trophy in 2020, Zilisch began racing sports cars in 2021, adding stock cars to his program the next year. Zilisch broke onto the racing scene in 2024, winning the 24 Hours of Daytona and the 12 Hours of Sebring in the LMP2 class in his first attempts and winning in his first career NASCAR Xfinity Series start in September at Watkins Glen International, less than two months after his eighteenth birthday. In 2025, he competed full-time in the Xfinity Series for JR Motorsports, scoring ten wins and a record-breaking eighteen consecutive top-five finishes. He won Rookie of the Year that year, and reached the championship race at Phoenix Raceway, finishing second in the championship. In 2026, he was full-time in the NASCAR Cup Series for Trackhouse Racing. In 2028, Zilisch will join Hendrick Motorsports.

== Racing career ==
=== Early career ===
Karting

Zilisch started competing in go-karts at the age of five in 2011. He would spend ten years racing karts before moving up to cars in 2021. Zilisch started primarily in the United States until 2017, when he won the Mini Rok World Championship in South Garda, Italy, competing against more than 160 other competitors from 33 different countries. He returned to Europe to race primarily in the FIA OKJ class in 2018–2020 and made the "A" final in the OKJ World Championship in both 2019 and 2020. In 2020, he also became the first ever American to win the CIK-FIA Karting Academy Trophy, a three-race series where competitors from all over the world all race on identical equipment.

Mazda MX-5 Global Cup and Trans-Am

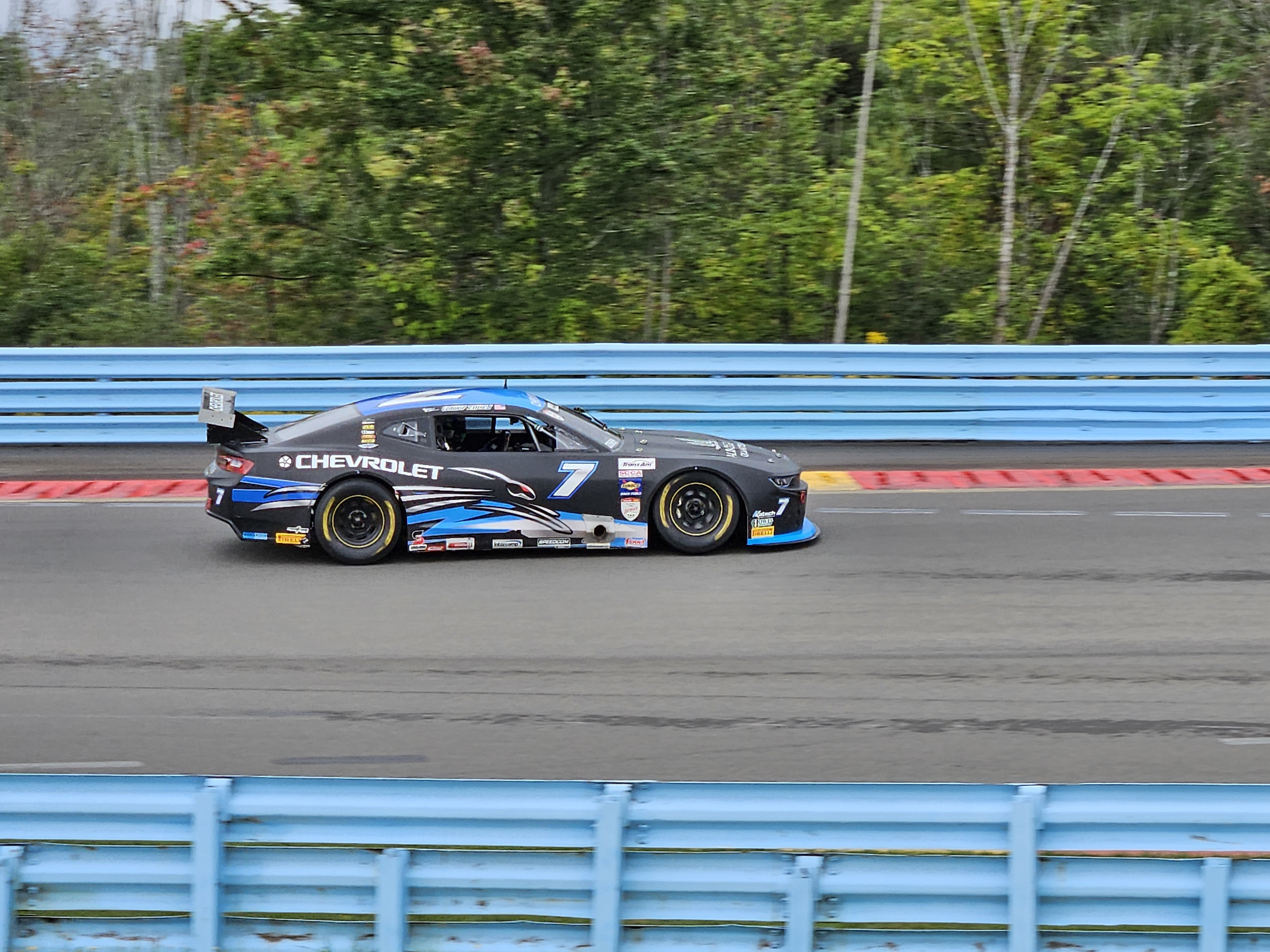
Zilisch in the Trans-Am race at Watkins Glen in 2023

Zilisch began racing cars in early 2021 with the Sports Car Club of America in the Spec Miata class and quickly began showing strong results, setting three track records and reaching the podium multiple times. At the SCCA Run-offs in Indianapolis that year, Zilisch finished third out of ~ ninety cars in the competitive Spec Miata class and shortly thereafter was named the SCCA Jim Fitzgerald Rookie of the Year. Zilisch also competed in the Mazda MX-5 Cup Shootout competition in late 2021, winning the $110,000 scholarship, which would fund his participation in the series in 2022. In late 2021, Zilisch also ran his first Trans Am TA2 race at Virginia International Raceway, earning pole position while shattering the track record as a rookie driver. He led the race early until a mechanical issue forced him to retire early; however, his performance in the race led to his being invited to race TA2 full-time for Silver Hare Racing in 2022.

In the Mazda MX-5 Cup series, Zilisch recorded four wins in the season and nearly won the championship in the last race of the season at Road Atlanta. In that race, Zilisch needed to finish at least three spots ahead of Jared Thomas to win the $250K championship prize and on track he did that, finishing sixth to Thomas' ninth-place finish, however a post-race penalty to Alex Bachoura (who finished in between Zilisch and Thomas) ended up moving Thomas up one position and handing him the championship. Zilisch won $85K for second place and was also named the Mazda MX-5 Cup Rookie of the Year for 2022.

IMSA

On December 12, 2024, it was announced that Zilisch will drive a Corvette Z06 GT3.R in the GTD Pro class in the 2025 Rolex 24 At Daytona alongside Shane van Gisbergen, Ben Keating and Scott McLaughlin in a joint partnership between Trackhouse Racing and TF Sport. They finished ninth in class, one lap down. On December 16, 2025, Zilisch was confirmed to enter in the GTP class for Cadillac Whelen, driving a Cadillac V-Series.R in the 2026 24 Hours of Daytona. With teammates Jack Aitken, Earl Bamber, and Frederik Vesti, they finished second overall, just 1.5 seconds behind the winner, Porsche Penske Motorsport.

=== Late Models ===
Pro Late Models

In June 2022, Zilisch would make his Pro Late Model debut in the No. 4 for Setzer Racing and Development at Orange County Speedway with the Carolina Pro Late Model Series where he would win the pole, and led all the laps en route to his first career victory in an Asphalt Late Model overall and Pro Late Model.

For 2023, Zilisch would return to the No. 25 for Rackley W.A.R. running select events in the CARS Pro Late Model Tour. He would win at Ace Speedway in his second start of the season, holding off Caden Kvapil to do so.

Late Model Stock Cars

In 2022, Zilisch began racing late-model cars to prepare himself for a potential path to NASCAR. He would start to run Late Model Stock Cars in the No. 57 for Carroll Speedshop. He scored two wins during the year, both coming at Hickory Motor Speedway, as well as two other podium positions.

For 2023, Zilisch returned to the No. 57 for Carroll Speedshop on a part-time basis in the CARS Late Model Stock Car Tour. At Hickory Motor Speedway during the Throwback 276, Zilisch ran a throwback to the No. 98 Dogecoin car driven in the NASCAR Cup Series in 2014 by his current driver coach Josh Wise.

=== ARCA Menards Series ===
2023

On August 14, 2023, it was announced Zilisch would make his ARCA Menards Series debut in the No. 28 for Pinnacle Racing Group at that weekend's race at Watkins Glen. Zilisch qualified second behind Corey LaJoie and then went on to dominate the race, leading 34 out of the race's 42 laps, and barely lost the race after getting moved in the final corner of the final lap from the lead by Jesse Love going on to still finish second despite an ill-handling car affected by a broken front sway bar.

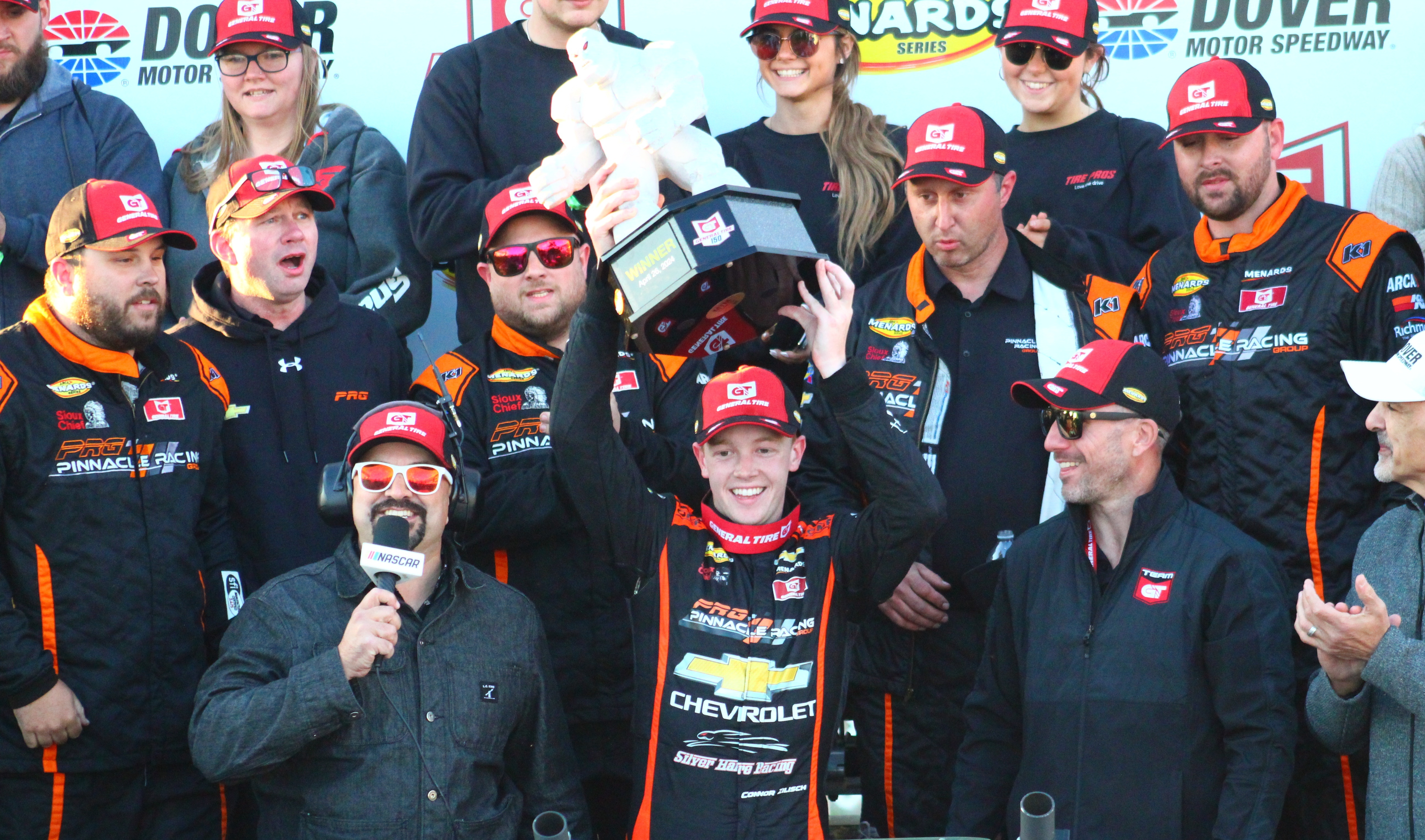
Zilisch and his crew celebrating after winning the General Tire 150 at Dover Motor Speedway.

2024

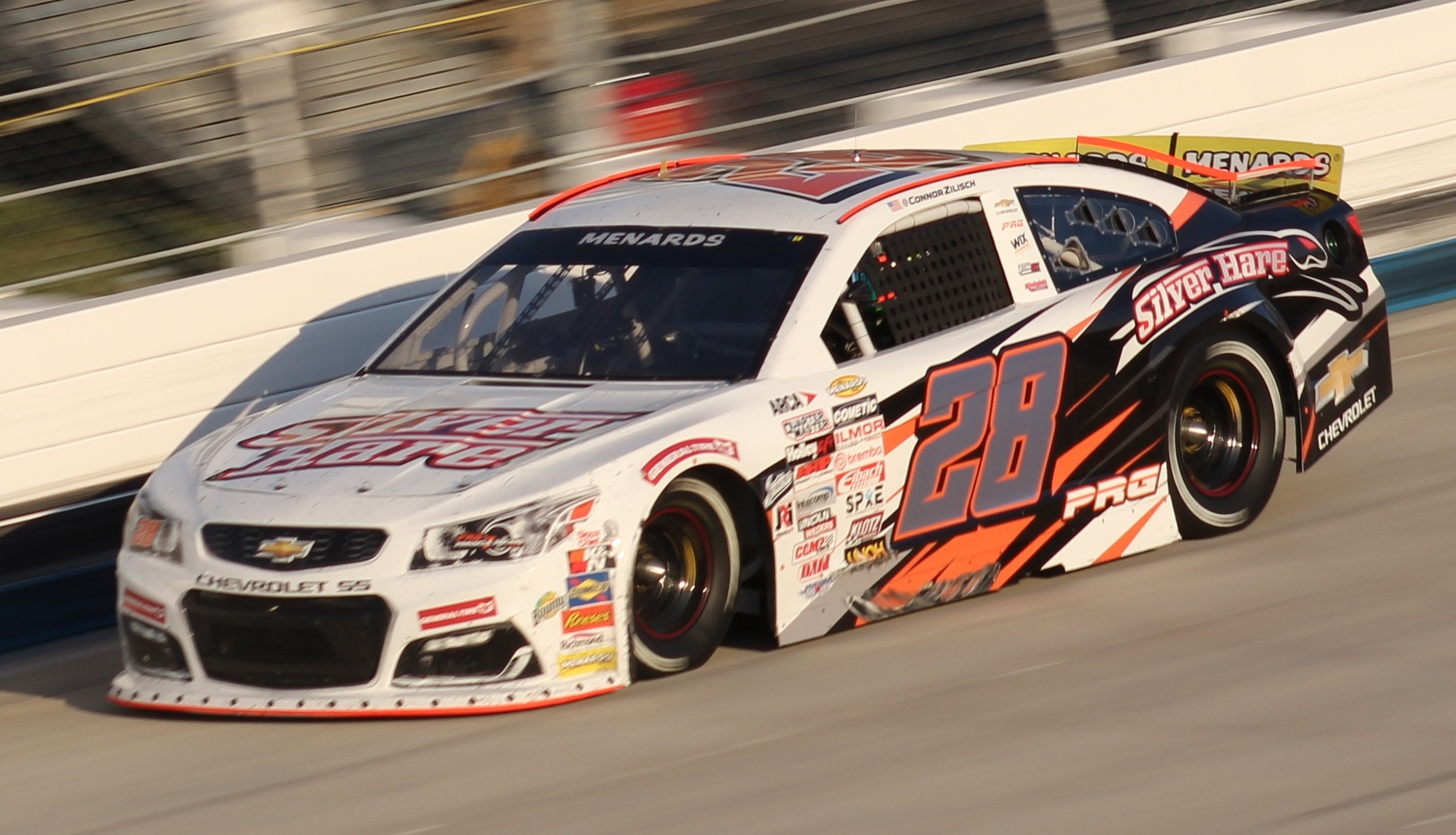
Zilisch's race-winning car at Dover Motor Speedway in 2024.

On March 18, 2024, it was announced that Zilisch would return to Pinnacle Racing Group to run a full season in the ARCA Menards Series East, driving the No. 28 car. In his first start at Five Flags Speedway, he missed practice and qualifying due to being at Circuit of the Americas for the NASCAR Truck Series race, and was replaced by Luke Fenhaus. Zilisch was able to make the race but struggled with mechanical issues throughout the event and finished fourth, two laps down. In his next race at Dover Motor Speedway, Zilisch took advantage of the leader's mishaps and led the final 42 laps of the event to earn his first career win in both the main and East Series. At the Nashville Fairgrounds Speedway, Zilisch qualified fourth and ran in the top three throughout the event, but did not have the car to beat the eventual race winner William Sawalich, he finished third behind Isabella Robusto. He rebounded the following race at Flat Rock Speedway, where he would go on to obliterate the competition, winning the pole and leading every lap of the race to earn his second career win. He continued with a hot streak of victories, winning the next two East Series events at Iowa Speedway and Lucas Oil Indianapolis Raceway Park, both in dominating fashion. At Michigan, his first start on an intermediate racetrack, Zilisch passed Tanner Gray late in the event and held off a charging Andrés Pérez de Lara in the final laps to score another victory, continuing his winning streak of 4–4 in the ARCA Series.

=== NASCAR ===
On January 11, 2024, Zilisch signed a multi-year contract with Trackhouse Racing as a developmental driver. His developmental program in 2024 and 2025 consists of races in the NASCAR Xfinity Series and the NASCAR Craftsman Truck Series, as well as ARCA, CARS Tour, Trans-Am, and IMSA.

==== Craftsman Truck Series ====
2024: Ups, and downs at COTA, poles, and strong showings

On March 15, 2024, it was announced that Zilisch would run a three-race schedule for Spire Motorsports in the NASCAR Craftsman Truck Series, driving the No. 7 truck, including a race at Homestead–Miami Speedway in a coordinated entry fielded by Spire. He made his debut at Circuit of the Americas, shocking the field after winning the pole in his first career start. On the first lap, Zilisch locked up his brakes and ultimately missed the first corner, losing the lead and falling to the back. He battled through many mid-race struggles, including penalties and spins. He would pass the most trucks throughout the entire race, and eventually made it back to the top five in the final stages. He was unable to catch the eventual winner Corey Heim and settled for a fourth-place finish in his series debut. Following his performance, Spire added three more races to Zilisch's schedule, which includes Richmond, Bristol, and Martinsville.

2025: Part-time

On August 4, 2025, after it was announced that Kaden Honeycutt would be released from Niece Motorsports, it was announced that Zilisch would compete in the race at Watkins Glen for the team. Later on, Zilisch drove the No. 7 truck for Spire Motorsports at the Charlotte Roval.

==== O'Reilly Auto Parts Series ====
2024: Great showings, winning on debut

On March 12, 2024, it was announced that Zilisch would run a four-race slate with JR Motorsports in the NASCAR Xfinity Series, driving the No. 88 car. Following his 18th birthday on July 22, Zilisch competed in the races at Watkins Glen, Kansas, Homestead–Miami, and the season finale at Phoenix. At Watkins Glen, Zilisch won the pole, led the most laps, and saved enough fuel in two overtime restarts for the win in his Xfinity Series debut, becoming the first driver in over three years (Ty Gibbs at the 2021 Daytona RC race) to win in their Xfinity Series debut.

2025: First full-time season, multiple injuries, and multiple victories

On August 7, 2024, it was announced on The Dale Jr. Download that Zilisch would drive the No. 88 car for JRM full-time in 2025. After a slow start to the season, including finishes outside the top 25 at Daytona and Atlanta, Zilisch won his first race of the year at Circuit of the Americas. At the spring Talladega race, Zilisch was spun from the lead by Jesse Love down the track where the car hit the inside wall head-on. Zilisch complained about his back but exited under his own power. The back injury he suffered forced him to sit out and be replaced by Kyle Larson at Texas, who won in double overtime. Zilisch returned with back-to-back second place finishes at Charlotte and Nashville. Following the Nashville race, crew chief Mardy Lindley was suspended for one race for two unsecured lug nuts. With Dale Earnhardt Jr. as his substitute crew chief, Zilisch scored his second win of the season at Pocono. With two-laps to go in Chicago, teammate Shane van Gisbergen would push Zilisch into the wall to win. The next week, Zilisch would beat van Gisbergen at Sonoma. The following week, he won at Dover, after the race was shortened by 66 laps. He also won the next weekend at Indianapolis, earning JRM their 100th-career victory in the series.

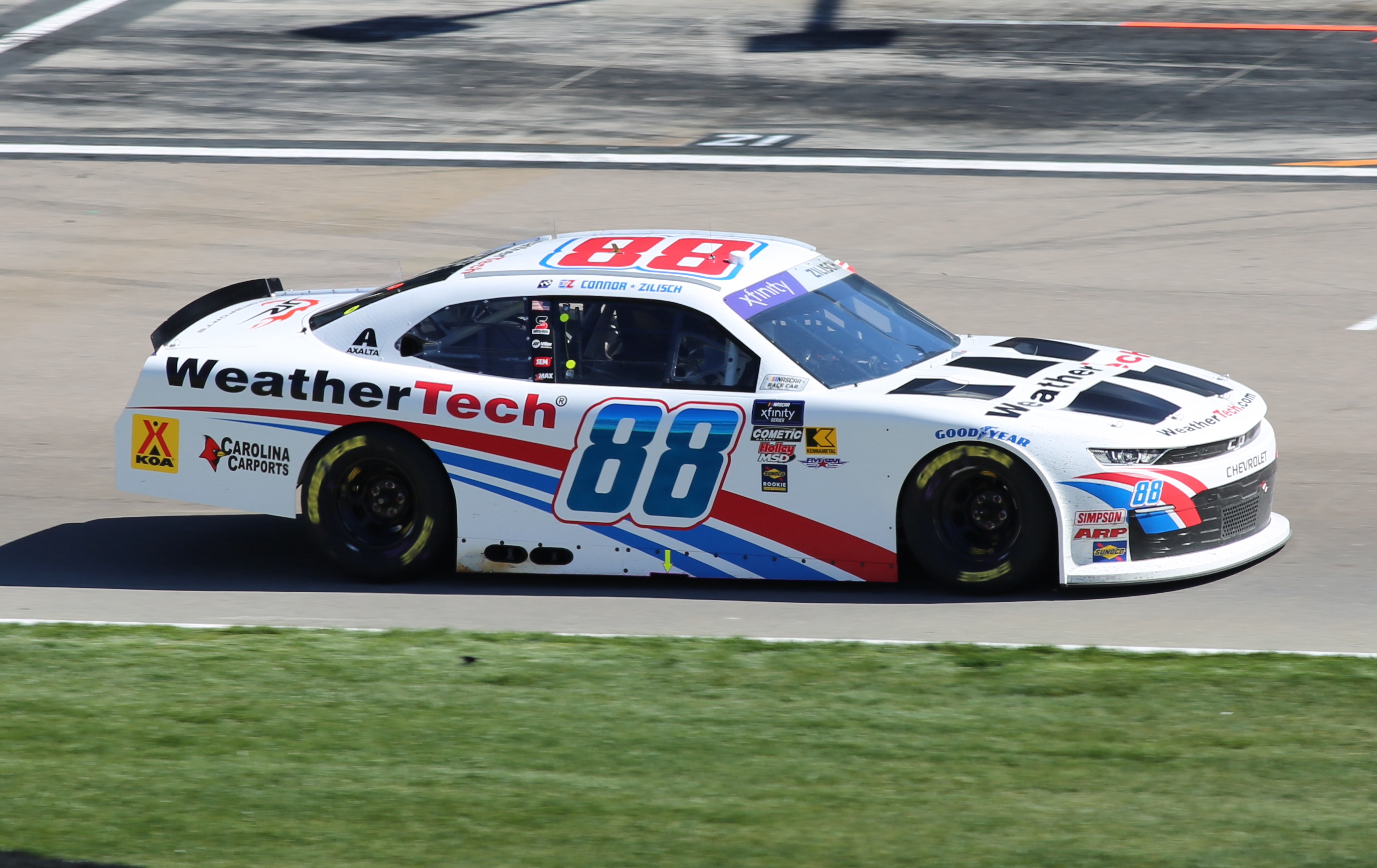
Zilisch's No. 88 car at Las Vegas Motor Speedway in 2025

Two weeks later, Zilisch won at Watkins Glen after a late red flag delayed the race. While exiting his car during the celebration in victory lane, Zilisch lost his footing on the driver's window sill after exiting and fell to the floor head-first. Safety members responded quickly, and he was transported by ambulance to a local hospital, where doctors determined that while CT scans returned no sign of head injuries, he suffered a broken collarbone. Zilisch would race the next event at Daytona, which was conveniently after a week off, but the injury forced him to be replaced at the first caution. Parker Kligerman took over the car and won the race, with Zilisch receiving the credit as the driver who started the car. After recovering from the injury, Zilisch returned and won at Portland and the series' return to Gateway to secure the Regular Season Championship with nine wins on the season.

In the playoffs, Zilisch recorded his tenth and final race win of the year at the Charlotte Roval. Zilisch would advance to the Championship 4 after the fall Talladega race, where he finished 23rd, snapping his record-breaking streak of eighteen-straight top-five finishes in the series, dating back to Charlotte in May. Zilisch led late in the final race at Phoenix Raceway, but was passed for the race lead and the championship by Jesse Love, and subsequently by Aric Almirola for second place. Zilisch finished in third place in the race and second in the championship.

2026: Part-time with JR Motorsports

On September 24, 2025, it was announced that Zilisch will drive the No. 1 car part-time for the 2026 season, sharing the ride with Carson Kvapil.

==== Cup Series ====
2025: Part-time basis with Trackhouse

On January 23, 2025, it was announced that Zilisch would make his NASCAR Cup Series debut at Circuit of the Americas, driving the No. 87 for Trackhouse with sponsorship from Red Bull. Zilisch would crash into his teammate Daniel Suárez while trying to avoid the spinning latter. As a result, Zilisch would DNF in his debut. It was later announced that he would compete in the Coca-Cola 600 at Charlotte Motor Speedway, where he finished 23rd after getting caught up in a three-car wreck on lap 113. On June 4, it was announced that Zilisch would compete at Atlanta and Watkins Glen. At Atlanta, he finished with a career best eleventh place. At Watkins Glen, Zilisch qualified in 27th, but withdrew following his injury from the previous day.

2026: Full-time with Trackhouse

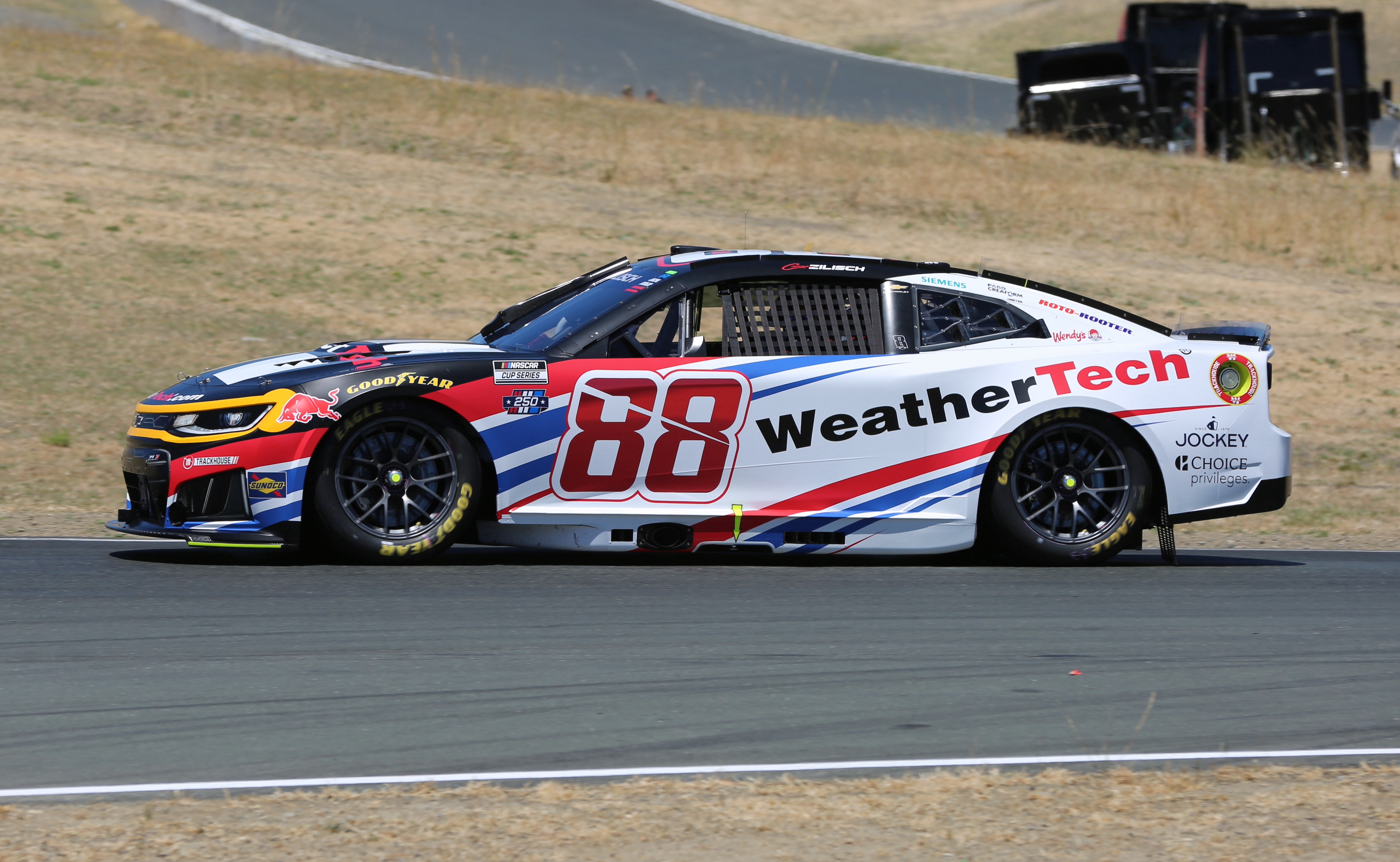
Zilisch's No. 88 car at Sonoma Raceway in 2026

On August 23, 2025, Trackhouse announced that Zilisch signed a multi-year contract to drive for Trackhouse in 2026. On November 7, 2025, it was revealed that Zilisch would run the No. 88, while Shane van Gisbergen would run the No. 97. He started the 2026 season with a 33rd-place finish at the 2026 Daytona 500. Zilisch scored his first top-ten at Sonoma, where he finished in seventh.

2027: Final year at Trackhouse

The 2027 season will be Zilisch's final year with Trackhouse.

2028: Hendrick Motorsports

On August 17, 2026, Hendrick Motorsports announced that Zilisch would drive the No. 48 for them on a multi-year contract beginning in 2028, replacing the retiring Alex Bowman, with a backed sponsorship from Ally.

== Personal life ==
Zilisch was born and raised in Charlotte, North Carolina, and is the youngest of three children. Zilisch's mother, Janice Kerr, was a gymnast on the Canadian women's national artistic gymnastics team and a member of the 1983 World Artistic Gymnastics Championships tenth-place team. She was the NCAA Southeast Region all-around champion in 1987 and 1988. Kerr was named the Southeastern Conference H. Boyd McWhorter Scholar-Athlete of the Year in 1990, one of only four Florida Gators to have won the award.

Zilisch, when not driving himself, is a driver coach to younger drivers in the Karting ranks. He was announced as a client of KHI Management in 2021, but subsequently parted ways with the company in early 2023. Zilisch also spots for drivers including Stefan Parsons and Ross Chastain.

=== In media ===
Zilisch runs a YouTube channel with fellow drivers Jesse Love and Daniel Dye called "Shake N Bake Sports". In 2026, Zilisch joined the NASCAR on The CW crew as a guest analyst in Nashville.

== Motorsports career results ==
=== Career summary ===
Season	Series	Team	Races	Wins	Top 5	Top 10	Points	Position
2021	Mazda MX-5 Cup	Hixon Motor Sports	2	0	1	1	360	32nd
2021	Trans-Am TA2 Series	Nitro Motorsports	1	0	0	0	0	NC†
2022	Mazda MX-5 Cup	Hixon Motor Sports	14	4	7	10	3600	**2nd**
2022	Trans-Am TA2 Series	Silver Hare Racing	11	0	3	5	125	13th
2022	Carolina Pro Late Model Series	Setzer Racing and Development	1	1	1	1	0	30th
2023	Mazda MX-5 Cup	Hixon Motor Sports	10	4	7	8	2920	8th
2023	Trans-Am	Showtime Motorsports	1	1	1	1	110	15th
2023	Trans-Am TA2 Series	Silver Hare Racing	13	5	7	8	886	4th
2023	CARS Late Model Stock Car Tour	Carroll Speed Shop	8	0	0	2	146	22nd
2023	CARS Pro Late Model Tour	Rackley W.A.R.	5	1	3	5	157	11th
2023	ARCA Menards Series	Pinnacle Racing Group	1	0	1	1	44	68th
2024	Mazda MX-5 Cup	BSI Racing	8	1	6	6	2060	13th
2024	CARS Late Model Stock Car Tour	Pinnacle Racing Group	6	1	1	3	139	24th
2024	ARCA Menards Series	Pinnacle Racing Group	8	5	7	7	338	15th
2024	ARCA Menards Series East	Pinnacle Racing Group	8	4	7	7	436	**2nd**
2024	ARCA Menards Series West	Pinnacle Racing Group	1	1	1	1	48	37th
2024	IMSA SportsCar Championship – LMP2	Era Motorsport	5	2	4	4	1597	14th
2024	NASCAR Craftsman Truck Series	Spire Motorsports	5	0	1	1	0	NC†
2024	NASCAR Craftsman Truck Series	Henderson Motorsports	1	0	0	0	0	NC†
2024	NASCAR Xfinity Series	JR Motorsports	4	1	3	3	160	33rd
2025	IMSA SportsCar Championship – GTD Pro	Trackhouse by TF Sport	1	0	0	1	243	35th
2025	NASCAR Craftsman Truck Series	Niece Motorsports	1	0	0	1	0	NC†
2025	NASCAR Craftsman Truck Series	Spire Motorsports	1	0	1	1	0	NC†
2025	NASCAR Xfinity Series	JR Motorsports	32	10	20	23	4034	**2nd**
2025	NASCAR Cup Series	Trackhouse Racing	3	0	0	0	0	NC†
2026	IMSA SportsCar Championship – GTP	Cadillac Whelen	1	0	1	1	340	28th
2026	CARS Late Model Stock Car Tour	JR Motorsports	1	0	0	1	36	55th
2026	NASCAR Craftsman Truck Series	Spire Motorsports	3	0	3	3	0	NC†
2026	NASCAR O'Reilly Auto Parts Series	JR Motorsports	9	2	3	7	0	NC†
2026	NASCAR Cup Series	Trackhouse Racing	36	0	0	2	410	33rd

^{†} As Zilisch was a guest driver, he was ineligible for championship points.

=== NASCAR ===
(key) (Bold – Pole position awarded by qualifying time. Italics – Pole position earned by points standings or practice time. * – Most laps led.)

==== Cup Series ====
NASCAR Cup Series results
Year	Team	No.	Make	1	2	3	4	5	6	7	8	9	10	11	12	13	14	15	16	17	18	19	20	21	22	23	24	25	26	27	28	29	30	31	32	33	34	35	36	NCSC	Pts	Ref
2025	Trackhouse Racing	87	Chevy	DAY	ATL	COA; 37	PHO	LVS	HOM	MAR	DAR	BRI	TAL	TEX	KAN	CLT; 23	NSH	MCH	MXC	POC	ATL; 11	CSC	SON	DOV	IND	IOW	GLN; Wth	RCH	DAY	DAR	GTW	BRI	NHA	KAN	ROV	LVS	TAL	MAR	PHO	47th	0^{1}	
2026	Trackhouse Racing	88	Chevy	DAY; 33	ATL; 30	COA; 14	PHO; 29	LVS; 32	DAR; 18	MAR; 26	BRI; 33	KAN; 29	TAL; 26	TEX; 16	GLN; 20	CLT; 39	NSH; 38	MCH; 37	POC; 23	COR; 37	SON; 7	CHI; 38	ATL; 28	NWS; 32	IND; 34	IOW; 11	RCH; 25	NHA; 35	DAY; 25	DAR; 34	GTW; 7	BRI; 24	KAN; 29	LVS; 35	CLT; 21	PHO; 20	TAL; 29	MAR; 17	HOM; 19	33rd	410	

===== Daytona 500 =====
Year	Team	Manufacturer	Start	Finish
2026	Trackhouse Racing	Chevrolet	32	33

==== O'Reilly Auto Parts Series ====
NASCAR O'Reilly Auto Parts Series results
Year	Team	No.	Make	1	2	3	4	5	6	7	8	9	10	11	12	13	14	15	16	17	18	19	20	21	22	23	24	25	26	27	28	29	30	31	32	33	NOAPSC	Pts	Ref
2024	JR Motorsports	88	Chevy	DAY	ATL	LVS	PHO	COA	RCH	MAR	TEX	TAL	DOV	DAR	CLT	PIR	SON	IOW	NHA	NSH	CSC	POC	IND	MCH	DAY	DAR	ATL	**GLN**; 1*	BRI	KAN; 4	TAL	ROV	LVS	HOM; 12	MAR	PHO; 4	33rd	160	
2025	JR Motorsports	88	Chevy	DAY; 27	ATL; 34	**COA**; 1*	PHO; 16	LVS; 9	HOM; 12	**MAR**; 28*	DAR; 6	BRI; 12	**CAR**; 13	TAL; 27	TEX	CLT; 2	NSH; 2	**MXC**; 5	POC; 1	ATL; 4	CSC; 2	SON; 1*	DOV; 1*	IND; 1	IOW; 4	**GLN**; 1*	DAY; 1	**PIR**; 1*	**GTW**; 1*	BRI; 5*	KAN; 2	**ROV**; 1*	LVS; 2	TAL; 23	MAR; 9	PHO; 3	2nd	4034	
2026	JR Motorsports	1	Chevy	DAY	ATL	**COA**; 21	PHO	LVS; 7	DAR	MAR	CAR	BRI; 1	KAN	TAL	TEX; 21	GLN; 1	DOV	CLT; 6	NSH	POC; 9	COR	SON; 2	CHI; 10	ATL	IND	IOW	DAY	DAR	GTW	BRI	LVS	CLT	PHO	TAL	MAR	HOM	70th	0^{1}	

==== Craftsman Truck Series ====
NASCAR Craftsman Truck Series results
Year	Team	No.	Make	1	2	3	4	5	6	7	8	9	10	11	12	13	14	15	16	17	18	19	20	21	22	23	24	25	NCTC	Pts	Ref
2024	Spire Motorsports	7	Chevy	DAY	ATL	LVS	BRI	**COA**; 4	MAR	TEX	KAN	DAR	NWS	CLT	GTW	NSH	POC	IRP	RCH; 29	MLW	**BRI**; 19	KAN	TAL; 33		MAR; 12	PHO			82nd	0^{1}	
2024	Henderson Motorsports	75	Chevy																					HOM; 18					82nd	0^{1}	
2025	Niece Motorsports	45	Chevy	DAY	ATL	LVS	HOM	MAR	BRI	CAR	TEX	KAN	NWS	CLT	NSH	MCH	POC	LRP	IRP	GLN; 8	RCH	DAR	BRI	NHA					86th	0^{1}	
2025	Spire Motorsports	7	Chevy																						ROV; 5	TAL	MAR	PHO	86th	0^{1}	
2026	Spire Motorsports	71	Chevy	DAY	ATL	STP	DAR	CAR	BRI	TEX	GLN; 2*	DOV									NHA; 5	BRI	KAN	CLT	PHO	TAL	MAR	HOM	97th	0^{1}	
2026	Spire Motorsports	77	Chevy										CLT; 3	NSH	MCH	COR	LRP	NWS	IRP	RCH									97th	0^{1}	

^{*} Season still in progress
^{1} Ineligible for series points

=== ARCA Menards Series ===
(key) (Bold – Pole position awarded by qualifying time. Italics – Pole position earned by points standings or practice time. * – Most laps led. ** – All laps led.)

ARCA Menards Series results
Year	Team	No.	Make	1	2	3	4	5	6	7	8	9	10	11	12	13	14	15	16	17	18	19	20	AMSC	Pts	Ref
2023	Pinnacle Racing Group	28	Chevy	DAY	PHO	TAL	KAN	CLT	BLN	ELK	MOH	IOW	POC	MCH	IRP	GLN; 2*	ISF	MLW	DSF	KAN	BRI	SLM	TOL	68th	44	
2024	Pinnacle Racing Group	28	Chevy	DAY	PHO	TAL	DOV; 1	KAN	CLT	IOW; 1*	MOH	BLN	IRP; 1*	SLM	ELK	MCH; 1	ISF	MLW; 2	DSF	**GLN**; 1**	**BRI**; 26	KAN; 2	TOL	15th	338	

==== ARCA Menards Series East ====
ARCA Menards Series East results
Year	Team	No.	Make	1	2	3	4	5	6	7	8	AMSEC	Pts	Ref
2024	Pinnacle Racing Group	28	Chevy	FIF; 4	DOV; 1	NSV; 3	**FRS**; 1**	IOW; 1*	IRP; 1*	MLW; 2	**BRI**; 26	2nd	436	

==== ARCA Menards Series West ====
ARCA Menards Series West results
Year	Team	No.	Make	1	2	3	4	5	6	7	8	9	10	11	12	AMSWC	Pts	Ref
2024	Pinnacle Racing Group	28	Chevy	PHO	KER	PIR	SON	IRW	IRW	SHA	TRI	MAD	AAS	KER	PHO; 1*	37th	48	

=== CARS Late Model Stock Car Tour ===
(key) (Bold – Pole position awarded by qualifying time. Italics – Pole position earned by points standings or practice time. * – Most laps led. ** – All laps led.)

CARS Late Model Stock Car Tour results
Year	Team	No.	Make	1	2	3	4	5	6	7	8	9	10	11	12	13	14	15	16	17	CLMSCTC	Pts	Ref
2022	Carroll Speedshop	28	Chevy	CRW	HCY	GPS	AAS	FCS	LGY	DOM	HCY	ACE	MMS	NWS	TCM	ACE	SBO; Wth^{†}	CRW			N/A	N/A	
2023	Carroll Speedshop	57	Chevy	SNM	FLC	HCY; 8	ACE; 12	NWS; 36	LGY	DOM; 9	CRW; 16		ACE; 11	TCM	WKS	AAS	SBO	TCM; 15	CRW		22nd	146	
2023	Carroll Speedshop	98	Chevy									HCY; 15									22nd	146	
2024	Pinnacle Racing Group	28	Chevy	SNM	HCY; 1	AAS	OCS; 15	ACE	TCM; 13	LGY	DOM	CRW; 7	HCY; 8	NWS; 15	ACE	WKS	FLC	SBO	TCM	NWS	24th	139	
2026	JR Motorsports	8	Chevy	SNM	WCS	NSV	CRW	ACE	LGY	DOM	NWS	HCY	AND	FLC; 6	TCM	NPS	SBO				55th	36	
^{†} – Entered but later withdrew from the race

=== CARS Pro Late Model Tour ===
(key)

CARS Pro Late Model Tour results
Year	Team	No.	Make	1	2	3	4	5	6	7	8	9	10	11	12	13	CPLMTC	Pts	Ref
2023	Rackley W.A.R.	25	Chevy	SNM	**HCY**; 3	ACE; 1	NWS; 3	TCM	DIL	**CRW**; 6	WKS	HCY; 6	TCM	SBO	TCM	CRW	11th	157	

=== Carolina Pro Late Model Series ===
(key) (Bold – Pole position awarded by qualifying time. Italics – Pole position earned by points standings or practice time. * – Most laps led. ** – All laps led.)

Carolina Pro Late Model Series results
Year	Team	No.	Make	1	2	3	4	5	6	7	8	9	10	11	12	13	CPLMSC	Pts	Ref
2022	Setzer Racing and Development	4	Chevy	SNM	FCS	HCY	AAS	DIL	MMS	**OCS**; 1**	CCS	HCY	HCY	AND	OCS	HCY	30th	N/A	

=== Complete IMSA SportsCar Championship results ===
(key) (Races in bold indicate pole position. Races in italics indicate fastest race lap in class. Results are overall/class)

Year	Team	Class	Make	Engine	1	2	3	4	5	6	7	8	9	10	Rank	Points	Ref
2024	Era Motorsport	LMP2	Oreca 07	Gibson GK428 4.2 L V8	DAY; 1	SEB; 1	WGL; 12	MOS	ELK	IMS; 3	PET; 3				14th	1597	
2025	Trackhouse by TF Sport	GTD Pro	Chevrolet Corvette Z06 GT3.R	Chevrolet LT6.R 5.5 L V8	DAY; 9	SEB	LGA	DET	WGL	MOS	ELK	VIR	IMS	PET	35th	243	
2026	Cadillac Whelen	GTP	Cadillac V-Series.R	Cadillac LMC55R 5.5 L V8	DAY; 2	SEB	LBH	LGA	DET	WGL	ELK	IMS	PET		28th	340	

=== Trans-Am TA2 Series ===
(key) (Races in bold indicate pole position)

Year	Team	Make	1	2	3	4	5	6	7	8	9	10	11	12	13	Rank	Points
2021	Nitro Motorsports	Ford Mustang	SEB	ATL	LGA	LIM	MDO	ROA	BRA	NAS	WGL	WGL	**VIR**; 22	COA		NC	0
2022	Silver Hare Racing	Chevrolet Camaro	SEB; 28	CLT; 19	ATL; 19	LGA; 5	SON; 5	LIM; 30	MDO	ROA; 6	NAS; 35	WGL; 10	VIR; 34	COA; 2		13th	125
2023	Silver Hare Racing	Chevrolet Camaro	SEB; 7	NLA; 4	ATL; 1	LIM; 4	**DET**; 23	DET; 1	MDO; DNS	ROA; 16	NSH; 1	**WGL**; DSQ	**GAT**; 1	**VIR**; 1	COA; 32	4th	886

=== Mazda MX-5 Cup ===
(key) (Races in bold indicate pole position. Races in italics indicate fastest race lap in class. Results are overall/class)

Year	Team	Make	Engine	1	2	3	4	5	6	7	8	9	10	11	12	13	14	Rank	Points
2021	Hixon Motor Sports	Mazda MX-5	SKYACTIV-G 2.0L four-cylinder engine	DAY	DAY	SEB	SEB	STP	STP	MOH	MOH	ELK	ELK	LGA	LGA	ATL; 22	ATL; 5	32nd	360
2022	Hixon Motor Sports	Mazda MX-5	SKYACTIV-G 2.0L four-cylinder engine	**DAY**; 4	**DAY**; 7	STP; 17	STP; 2	MOH; 17	MOH; 17	**WGL**; 22	WGL; 6	**ELK**; 1	**ELK**; 1	VIR; 2	VIR; 1	ATL; 1	**ATL**; 6	2nd	3600
2023	Hixon Motor Sports	Mazda MX-5	SKYACTIV-G 2.0L four-cylinder engine	**DAY**; 2	DAY; 15	STP; 2	STP; 1	LGA; 1	LGA; 22	WGL	WGL	ELK	ELK	VIR; 3	**VIR**; 9	ATL; 1	ATL; 1	8th	2920
2024	BSI Racing	Mazda MX-5	SKYACTIV-G 2.0L four-cylinder engine	**DAY**; 5	DAY; 25	**SEB**; 2	SEB; 2	LAG	LAG	MOH; 1	MOH; 5	MOP; 3	MOP; 18	VIR	VIR	ATL	ATL	13th	2060

* Season still in progress
