= 2025 BetRivers 200 =

20th race of the 2025 NASCAR Xfinity Series

Race details
- Race 20 of 33 of the 2025 NASCAR Xfinity Series
- Date: July 19, 2025
- Official name: 44th Annual BetRivers 200
- Location: Dover Motor Speedway in Dover, Delaware
- Course: Permanent racing facility
- Course length: 1 miles (1.6 km)
- Distance: 134 laps, 134 mi (215 km)
- Scheduled distance: 200 laps, 200 mi (321 km)
- Average speed: 105.999 mph (170.589 km/h)

Pole position
Driver	Taylor Gray	Joe Gibbs Racing
- Time: 23.578

Most laps led
Driver	Connor Zilisch	JR Motorsports
- Laps: 77

Winner
No. 88	Connor Zilisch	JR Motorsports

Television in the United States
- Network: The CW
- Announcers: Adam Alexander, Denny Hamlin, and Jamie McMurray

Radio in the United States
- Radio: PRN

The 2025 BetRivers 200 was the 20th stock car race of the 2025 NASCAR Xfinity Series, and the 44th iteration of the event. The race was held on Saturday, July 19, 2025, at Dover Motor Speedway in Dover, Delaware, a 1 mile (1.6 km) permanent asphalt oval shaped speedway. The race was contested over 134 laps, decreased from 200 laps due to inclement weather.

Connor Zilisch, driving for JR Motorsports, would take the lead from Brandon Jones after the first stage, and dominated the remainder of the event, winning the second stage and led a race-high 77 laps in a rain-shortened race to earn his fifth career NASCAR Xfinity Series win, his fourth of the season, and his second consecutive win. To fill out the podium, Aric Almirola and Jones, both driving for Joe Gibbs Racing, would finish 2nd and 3rd, respectively.

This was the final Xfinity Series event for Our Motorsports, after they announced on July 18 that they would cease their operations following this race. Three days prior, they released Kris Wright in a mutual agreement.

== Report ==
=== Background ===
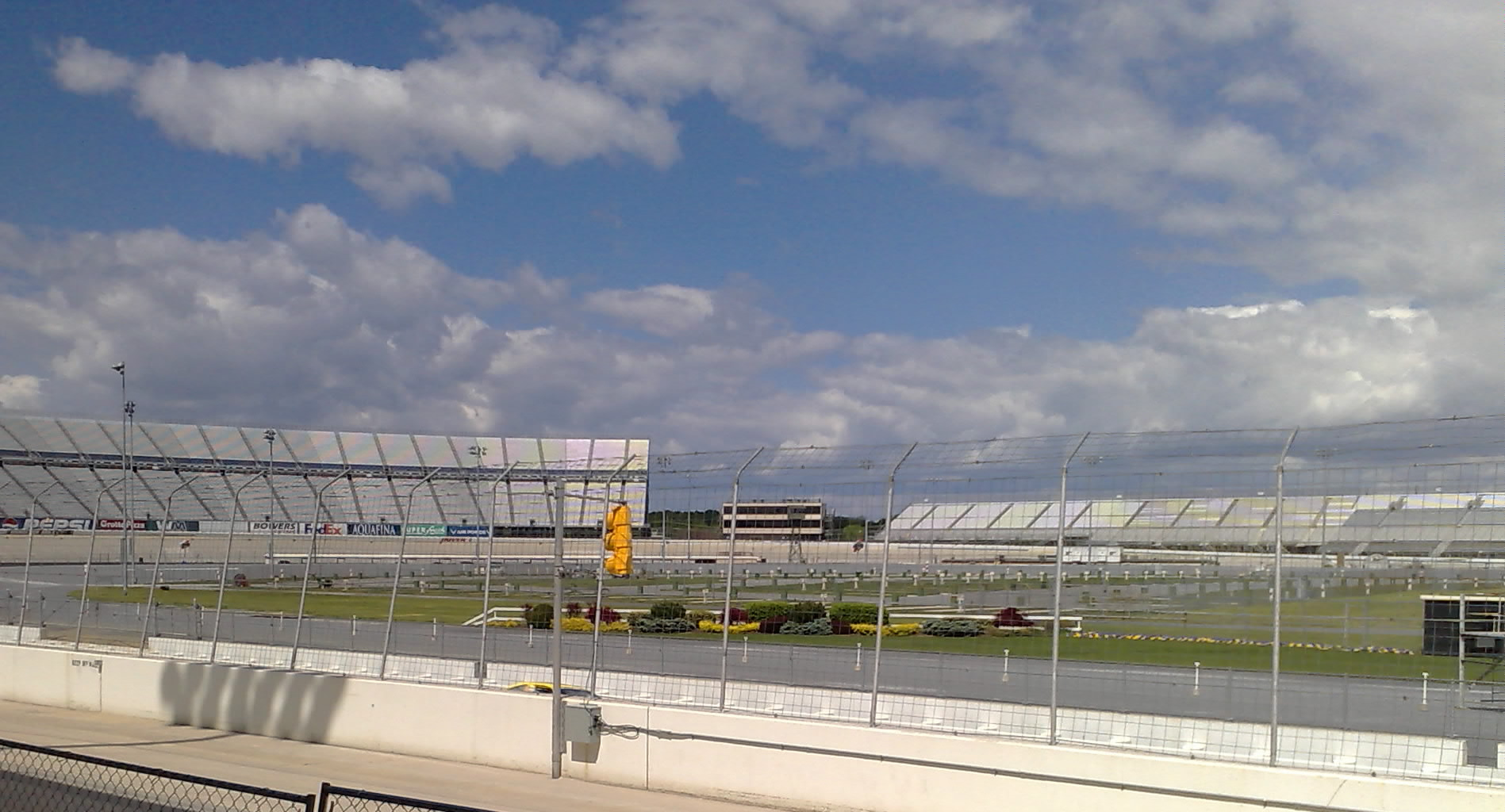
Dover Motor Speedway, the circuit where the race will be held.

Dover Motor Speedway is an oval race track in Dover, Delaware, United States that has held at least two NASCAR races since it opened in 1969. In addition to NASCAR, the track also hosted USAC and the NTT IndyCar Series. The track features one layout, a 1 mile (1.6 km) concrete oval, with 24° banking in the turns and 9° banking on the straights. The speedway is owned and operated by Speedway Motorsports.

The track, nicknamed "The Monster Mile", was built in 1969 by Melvin Joseph of Melvin L. Joseph Construction Company, Inc., with an asphalt surface, but was replaced with concrete in 1995. Six years later in 2001, the track's capacity moved to 135,000 seats, making the track have the largest capacity of sports venue in the mid-Atlantic. In 2002, the name changed to Dover International Speedway from Dover Downs International Speedway after Dover Downs Gaming and Entertainment split, making Dover Motorsports. From 2007 to 2009, the speedway worked on an improvement project called "The Monster Makeover", which expanded facilities at the track and beautified the track. After the 2014 season, the track's capacity was reduced to 95,500 seats.

==== Entry list ====
- (R) denotes rookie driver.
- (i) denotes driver who is ineligible for series driver points.

#	Driver	Team	Make
00	Sheldon Creed	Haas Factory Team	Ford
1	Carson Kvapil (R)	JR Motorsports	Chevrolet
2	Jesse Love	Richard Childress Racing	Chevrolet
4	Parker Retzlaff	Alpha Prime Racing	Chevrolet
5	Kaz Grala (i)	Our Motorsports	Chevrolet
07	Nick Leitz	SS-Green Light Racing	Chevrolet
7	Justin Allgaier	JR Motorsports	Chevrolet
8	Sammy Smith	JR Motorsports	Chevrolet
9	Ross Chastain (i)	JR Motorsports	Chevrolet
10	Daniel Dye (R)	Kaulig Racing	Chevrolet
11	Josh Williams	Kaulig Racing	Chevrolet
14	Garrett Smithley	SS-Green Light Racing	Chevrolet
16	Christian Eckes (R)	Kaulig Racing	Chevrolet
17	Jake Finch	Hendrick Motorsports	Chevrolet
18	William Sawalich (R)	Joe Gibbs Racing	Toyota
19	Aric Almirola	Joe Gibbs Racing	Toyota
20	Brandon Jones	Joe Gibbs Racing	Toyota
21	Austin Hill	Richard Childress Racing	Chevrolet
24	Ryan Truex	Sam Hunt Racing	Toyota
25	Harrison Burton	AM Racing	Ford
26	Dean Thompson (R)	Sam Hunt Racing	Toyota
27	Jeb Burton	Jordan Anderson Racing	Chevrolet
28	Kyle Sieg	RSS Racing	Ford
31	Blaine Perkins	Jordan Anderson Racing	Chevrolet
32	Rajah Caruth (i)	Jordan Anderson Racing	Chevrolet
35	Glen Reen	Joey Gase Motorsports	Toyota
39	Ryan Sieg	RSS Racing	Ford
41	Sam Mayer	Haas Factory Team	Ford
42	Anthony Alfredo	Young's Motorsports	Chevrolet
44	Brennan Poole	Alpha Prime Racing	Chevrolet
45	Lavar Scott	Alpha Prime Racing	Chevrolet
48	Nick Sanchez (R)	Big Machine Racing	Chevrolet
51	Jeremy Clements	Jeremy Clements Racing	Chevrolet
53	David Starr	Joey Gase Motorsports	Chevrolet
54	Taylor Gray (R)	Joe Gibbs Racing	Toyota
70	Leland Honeyman	Cope Family Racing	Chevrolet
71	Ryan Ellis	DGM Racing	Chevrolet
88	Connor Zilisch (R)	JR Motorsports	Chevrolet
91	Josh Bilicki	DGM Racing	Chevrolet
99	Matt DiBenedetto	Viking Motorsports	Chevrolet
Official entry list

== Practice ==
For practice, drivers were separated into two groups, A and B. Both sessions were 25 minutes long, and was held on Saturday, July 19, at 11:00 AM EST. Jesse Love, driving for Richard Childress Racing, would set the fastest time between both sessions, with a lap of 23.804, and a speed of 151.235 mph (243.389 km/h).

Pos.	#	Driver	Team	Make	Time	Speed
1	2	Jesse Love	Richard Childress Racing	Chevrolet	23.804	151.235
2	4	Parker Retzlaff	Alpha Prime Racing	Chevrolet	23.882	150.741
3	45	Lavar Scott	Alpha Prime Racing	Chevrolet	24.136	149.155
Full practice results

== Qualifying ==
Qualifying was held on Saturday, July 19, at 12:05 PM EST. Since Dover Motor Speedway is a short track, the qualifying procedure used is a single-car, two-lap system with one round. Drivers will be on track by themselves and will have two laps to post a qualifying time, and whoever sets the fastest time will win the pole.

Taylor Gray, driving for Joe Gibbs Racing, would score the pole for the race, with a lap of 23.578, and a speed of 152.685 mph (245.723 km/h).

Two drivers failed to qualify: Glen Reen and David Starr.

=== Qualifying results ===
Pos.	#	Driver	Team	Make	Time	Speed
1	54	Taylor Gray (R)	Joe Gibbs Racing	Toyota	23.578	152.685
2	48	Nick Sanchez (R)	Big Machine Racing	Chevrolet	23.673	152.072
3	88	Connor Zilisch (R)	JR Motorsports	Chevrolet	23.753	151.560
4	20	Brandon Jones	Joe Gibbs Racing	Toyota	23.766	151.477
5	9	Ross Chastain (i)	JR Motorsports	Chevrolet	23.787	151.343
6	19	Aric Almirola	Joe Gibbs Racing	Toyota	23.794	151.299
7	7	Justin Allgaier	JR Motorsports	Chevrolet	23.835	151.038
8	18	William Sawalich (R)	Joe Gibbs Racing	Toyota	23.841	151.000
9	25	Harrison Burton	AM Racing	Ford	23.884	150.729
10	27	Jeb Burton	Jordan Anderson Racing	Chevrolet	23.889	150.697
11	00	Sheldon Creed	Haas Factory Team	Ford	23.916	150.527
12	2	Jesse Love	Richard Childress Racing	Chevrolet	23.927	150.458
13	41	Sam Mayer	Haas Factory Team	Ford	23.948	150.326
14	1	Carson Kvapil (R)	JR Motorsports	Chevrolet	23.949	150.319
15	21	Austin Hill	Richard Childress Racing	Chevrolet	23.956	150.276
16	32	Rajah Caruth (i)	Jordan Anderson Racing	Chevrolet	24.000	150.000
17	8	Sammy Smith	JR Motorsports	Chevrolet	24.024	149.850
18	99	Matt DiBenedetto	Viking Motorsports	Chevrolet	24.024	149.850
19	39	Ryan Sieg	RSS Racing	Ford	24.135	149.161
20	26	Dean Thompson (R)	Sam Hunt Racing	Toyota	24.135	149.161
21	17	Jake Finch	Hendrick Motorsports	Chevrolet	24.140	149.130
22	45	Lavar Scott	Alpha Prime Racing	Chevrolet	24.192	148.810
23	44	Brennan Poole	Alpha Prime Racing	Chevrolet	24.205	148.730
24	31	Blaine Perkins	Jordan Anderson Racing	Chevrolet	24.206	148.723
25	70	Leland Honeyman	Cope Family Racing	Chevrolet	24.221	148.631
26	42	Anthony Alfredo	Young's Motorsports	Chevrolet	24.227	148.595
27	4	Parker Retzlaff	Alpha Prime Racing	Chevrolet	24.235	148.545
28	51	Jeremy Clements	Jeremy Clements Racing	Chevrolet	24.249	148.460
29	11	Josh Williams	Kaulig Racing	Chevrolet	24.309	148.093
30	10	Daniel Dye (R)	Kaulig Racing	Chevrolet	24.374	147.698
31	16	Christian Eckes (R)	Kaulig Racing	Chevrolet	24.438	147.312
32	24	Ryan Truex	Sam Hunt Racing	Toyota	24.441	147.293
Qualified by owner's points
33	91	Josh Bilicki	DGM Racing	Chevrolet	24.516	146.843
34	71	Ryan Ellis	DGM Racing	Chevrolet	24.531	146.753
35	28	Kyle Sieg	RSS Racing	Ford	24.653	146.027
36	5	Kaz Grala (i)	Our Motorsports	Chevrolet	24.721	145.625
37	14	Garrett Smithley	SS-Green Light Racing	Chevrolet	24.846	144.893
38	07	Nick Leitz	SS-Green Light Racing	Chevrolet	–	–
Failed to qualify
39	35	Glen Reen	Joey Gase Motorsports	Toyota	24.501	146.933
40	53	David Starr	Joey Gase Motorsports	Chevrolet	24.944	144.323
Official qualifying results
Official starting lineup

== Race results ==
Stage 1 Laps: 45

Pos.	#	Driver	Team	Make	Pts
1	54	Taylor Gray (R)	Joe Gibbs Racing	Toyota	10
2	19	Aric Almirola	Joe Gibbs Racing	Toyota	9
3	20	Brandon Jones	Joe Gibbs Racing	Toyota	8
4	88	Connor Zilisch (R)	JR Motorsports	Chevrolet	7
5	9	Ross Chastain (i)	JR Motorsports	Chevrolet	0
6	48	Nick Sanchez (R)	Big Machine Racing	Chevrolet	5
7	7	Justin Allgaier	JR Motorsports	Chevrolet	4
8	18	William Sawalich (R)	Joe Gibbs Racing	Toyota	3
9	2	Jesse Love	Richard Childress Racing	Chevrolet	2
10	00	Sheldon Creed	Haas Factory Team	Ford	1

Stage 2 Laps: 45

Pos.	#	Driver	Team	Make	Pts
1	88	Connor Zilisch (R)	JR Motorsports	Chevrolet	10
2	19	Aric Almirola	Joe Gibbs Racing	Toyota	9
3	20	Brandon Jones	Joe Gibbs Racing	Toyota	8
4	7	Justin Allgaier	JR Motorsports	Chevrolet	7
5	39	Ryan Sieg	RSS Racing	Ford	6
6	9	Ross Chastain (i)	JR Motorsports	Chevrolet	0
7	2	Jesse Love	Richard Childress Racing	Chevrolet	4
8	00	Sheldon Creed	Haas Factory Team	Ford	3
9	18	William Sawalich (R)	Joe Gibbs Racing	Toyota	2
10	21	Austin Hill	Richard Childress Racing	Chevrolet	1

Stage 3 Laps: 44*

Fin	St	#	Driver	Team	Make	Laps	Led	Status	Pts
1	3	88	Connor Zilisch (R)	JR Motorsports	Chevrolet	134	77	Running	57
2	6	19	Aric Almirola	Joe Gibbs Racing	Toyota	134	0	Running	53
3	4	20	Brandon Jones	Joe Gibbs Racing	Toyota	134	5	Running	51
4	7	7	Justin Allgaier	JR Motorsports	Chevrolet	134	0	Running	44
5	12	2	Jesse Love	Richard Childress Racing	Chevrolet	134	0	Running	38
6	19	39	Ryan Sieg	RSS Racing	Ford	134	0	Running	37
7	1	54	Taylor Gray (R)	Joe Gibbs Racing	Toyota	134	49	Running	40
8	11	00	Sheldon Creed	Haas Factory Team	Ford	134	0	Running	33
9	8	18	William Sawalich (R)	Joe Gibbs Racing	Toyota	134	0	Running	33
10	31	16	Christian Eckes (R)	Kaulig Racing	Chevrolet	134	0	Running	27
11	9	25	Harrison Burton	AM Racing	Ford	134	0	Running	26
12	13	41	Sam Mayer	Haas Factory Team	Ford	134	0	Running	25
13	15	21	Austin Hill	Richard Childress Racing	Chevrolet	134	0	Running	25
14	18	99	Matt DiBenedetto	Viking Motorsports	Chevrolet	134	0	Running	23
15	14	1	Carson Kvapil (R)	JR Motorsports	Chevrolet	134	0	Running	22
16	20	26	Dean Thompson (R)	Sam Hunt Racing	Toyota	134	0	Running	21
17	21	17	Jake Finch	Hendrick Motorsports	Chevrolet	134	0	Running	20
18	32	24	Ryan Truex	Sam Hunt Racing	Toyota	134	0	Running	19
19	27	4	Parker Retzlaff	Alpha Prime Racing	Chevrolet	134	0	Running	18
20	10	27	Jeb Burton	Jordan Anderson Racing	Chevrolet	134	0	Running	17
21	30	10	Daniel Dye (R)	Kaulig Racing	Chevrolet	134	0	Running	16
22	16	32	Rajah Caruth (i)	Jordan Anderson Racing	Chevrolet	134	0	Running	0
23	26	42	Anthony Alfredo	Young's Motorsports	Chevrolet	134	0	Running	14
24	17	8	Sammy Smith	JR Motorsports	Chevrolet	134	0	Running	13
25	23	44	Brennan Poole	Alpha Prime Racing	Chevrolet	134	0	Running	12
26	28	51	Jeremy Clements	Jeremy Clements Racing	Chevrolet	134	0	Running	11
27	29	11	Josh Williams	Kaulig Racing	Chevrolet	134	0	Running	10
28	22	45	Lavar Scott	Alpha Prime Racing	Chevrolet	134	0	Running	9
29	25	70	Leland Honeyman	Cope Family Racing	Chevrolet	133	0	Running	8
30	34	71	Ryan Ellis	DGM Racing	Chevrolet	131	0	Running	7
31	36	5	Kaz Grala (i)	Our Motorsports	Chevrolet	131	0	Running	0
32	24	31	Blaine Perkins	Jordan Anderson Racing	Chevrolet	131	0	Running	5
33	38	07	Nick Leitz	SS-Green Light Racing	Chevrolet	131	0	Running	4
34	33	91	Josh Bilicki	DGM Racing	Chevrolet	131	0	Running	3
35	37	14	Garrett Smithley	SS-Green Light Racing	Chevrolet	131	0	Running	2
36	35	28	Kyle Sieg	RSS Racing	Ford	131	3	Running	1
37	2	48	Nick Sanchez (R)	Big Machine Racing	Chevrolet	107	0	Steering	6
38	5	9	Ross Chastain (i)	JR Motorsports	Chevrolet	106	0	Rear Gear	0
Official race results

== Standings after the race ==
Drivers' Championship standings

	Pos	Driver	Points
	1	Justin Allgaier	730
2	2	Connor Zilisch	674 (–56)
1	3	Sam Mayer	652 (–78)
1	4	Austin Hill	647 (–83)
	5	Jesse Love	620 (–110)
1	6	Brandon Jones	578 (–152)
1	7	Carson Kvapil	576 (–154)
	8	Sheldon Creed	551 (–179)
2	9	Taylor Gray	526 (–204)
	10	Sammy Smith	515 (–215)
2	11	Nick Sanchez	513 (–217)
	12	Jeb Burton	497 (–233)
Official driver's standings

Manufacturers' Championship standings

Pos	Manufacturer	Points
1	Chevrolet	785
2	Toyota	652 (–133)
3	Ford	631 (–154)

- Note: Only the first 12 positions are included for the driver standings.

Previous race: 2025 Pit Boss/FoodMaxx 250	NASCAR Xfinity Series; 2025 season	Next race: 2025 Pennzoil 250
