= 2025 Mission 200 at The Glen =

23rd race of the 2025 NASCAR Xfinity Series

Race details
- Race 23 of 33 of the 2025 NASCAR Xfinity Series
- Date: August 9, 2025
- Official name: 30th Annual Mission 200 at The Glen
- Location: Watkins Glen International, Watkins Glen, New York
- Course: Permanent racing facility
- Course length: 2.454 miles (3.949 km)
- Distance: 82 laps, 201 mi (323 km)
- Scheduled distance: 82 laps, 201 mi (323 km)
- Average speed: 82.102 mph (132.130 km/h)

Pole position
Driver	Connor Zilisch	JR Motorsports
- Time: 1:10.884

Most laps led
Driver	Connor Zilisch	JR Motorsports
- Laps: 60

Winner
No. 88	Connor Zilisch	JR Motorsports

Television in the United States
- Network: The CW
- Announcers: Adam Alexander and Jamie McMurray

Radio in the United States
- Radio: MRN

The 2025 Mission 200 at The Glen was the 23rd stock car race of the 2025 NASCAR Xfinity Series, and the 30th iteration of the event. The race was held on Saturday, August 9, 2025, in Watkins Glen, New York at Watkins Glen International, a 2.454 miles (3.949 km) permanent road course. The race took the scheduled 82 laps to complete.

After a wild final stage and a long red flag delay, Connor Zilisch, driving for JR Motorsports, would continue his road course dominance, winning the second stage and led a race-high 60 laps to earn his seventh career NASCAR Xfinity Series win, and his sixth of the season. To fill out the podium, Sam Mayer, driving for Haas Factory Team, and Sammy Smith, driving for JR Motorsports, would finish 2nd and 3rd, respectively.

The race was marred by a vicious multi-car incident on lap 73. Coming out of the outer loop and into the short chute, Michael McDowell and Austin Hill made contact while battling for the lead. Hill tapped the left rear quarter-panel of McDowell's car, sending McDowell into the outside wall head-on, sustaining heavy damage. William Sawalich and Taylor Gray, who was running 6th and 7th at the time, were the first drivers to be collected in the pileup. Multiple drivers in the back of the field began piling in, including Ryan Ellis, who plowed into his teammate Josh Bilicki while trying to slow down. All drivers were evaluated and released from the infield care center shortly after the incident.

Following the race, Zilisch was taken to a local hospital after a scary fall in victory lane. After climbing out of his car for celebrations, he lost balance after getting his left leg stuck between the driver's side window netting, falling awkwardly and hitting his head on the pavement. Although CT scans showed no head injuries, he suffered a broken collarbone. As a result, Trackhouse Racing withdrew the No. 87 entry that Zilisch was scheduled to run in the Cup Series race the next day.

== Report ==
=== Background ===
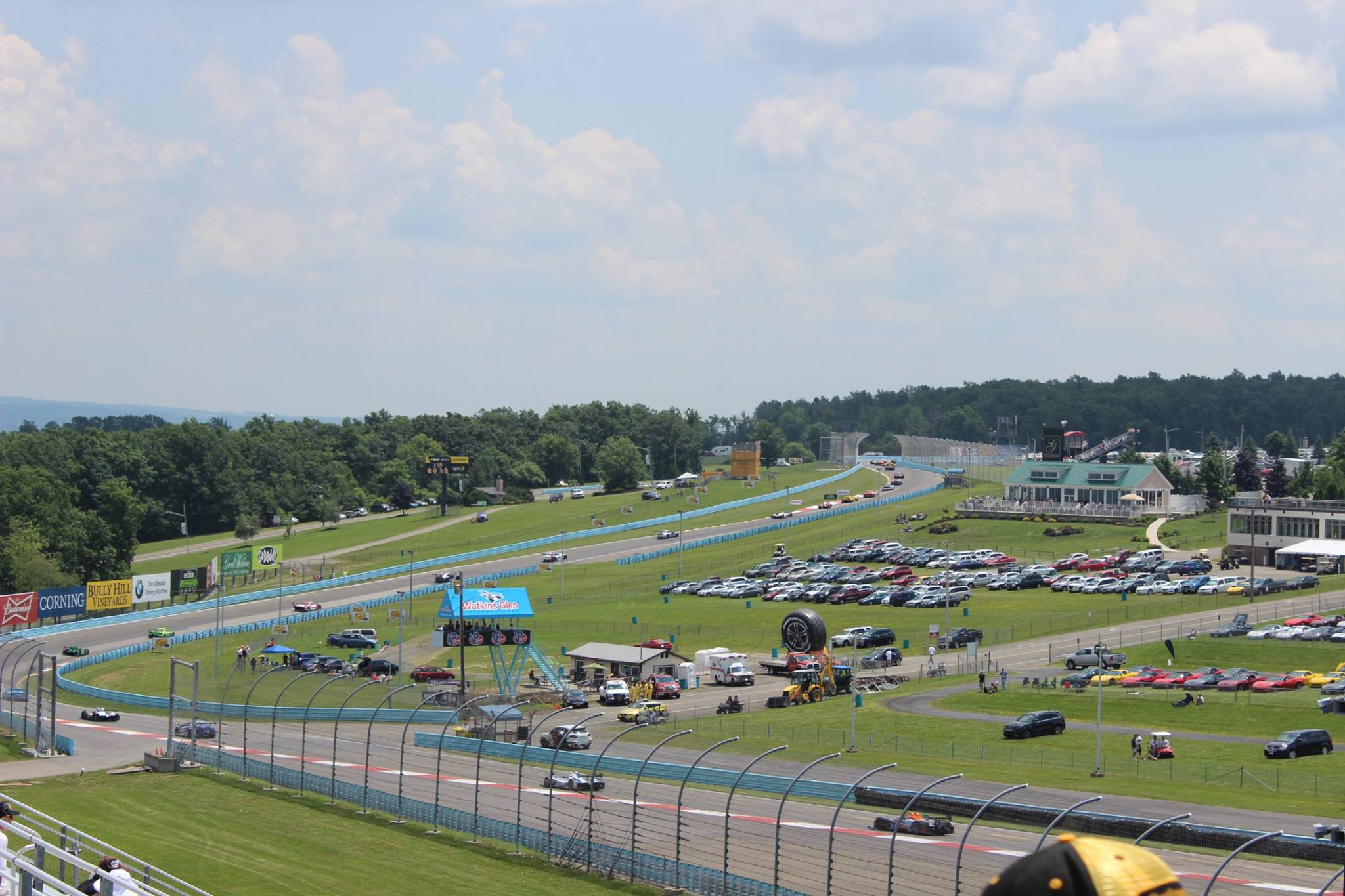
Watkins Glen International, the track where the race will be held.

Watkins Glen International (nicknamed "The Glen") is an automobile race track located in Watkins Glen, New York at the southern tip of Seneca Lake. It was long known around the world as the home of the Formula One United States Grand Prix, which it hosted for twenty consecutive years (1961–1980), but the site has been home to road racing of nearly every class, including the World Sportscar Championship, Trans-Am, Can-Am, NASCAR Cup Series, the International Motor Sports Association and the IndyCar Series.

Initially, public roads in the village were used for the race course. In 1956 a permanent circuit for the race was built. In 1968 the race was extended to six hours, becoming the 6 Hours of Watkins Glen. The circuit's current layout has more or less been the same since 1971, although a chicane was installed at the uphill Esses in 1975 to slow cars through these corners, where there was a fatality during practice at the 1973 United States Grand Prix. The chicane was removed in 1985, but another chicane called the "Inner Loop" was installed in 1992 after J.D. McDuffie's fatal accident during the previous year's NASCAR Winston Cup event.

The circuit is known as the Mecca of North American road racing and is a very popular venue among fans and drivers. The facility is currently owned by International Speedway Corporation.

=== Entry list ===
- (R) denotes rookie driver.
- (i) denotes driver who is ineligible for series driver points.

#	Driver	Team	Make
00	Sheldon Creed	Haas Factory Team	Ford
1	Carson Kvapil (R)	JR Motorsports	Chevrolet
2	Jesse Love	Richard Childress Racing	Chevrolet
4	Parker Retzlaff	Alpha Prime Racing	Chevrolet
07	Preston Pardus	SS-Green Light Racing	Chevrolet
7	Justin Allgaier	JR Motorsports	Chevrolet
8	Sammy Smith	JR Motorsports	Chevrolet
9	Shane van Gisbergen (i)	JR Motorsports	Chevrolet
10	Daniel Dye (R)	Kaulig Racing	Chevrolet
11	Michael McDowell (i)	Kaulig Racing	Chevrolet
14	Garrett Smithley	SS-Green Light Racing	Chevrolet
16	Christian Eckes (R)	Kaulig Racing	Chevrolet
18	William Sawalich (R)	Joe Gibbs Racing	Toyota
19	Riley Herbst (i)	Joe Gibbs Racing	Toyota
20	Brandon Jones	Joe Gibbs Racing	Toyota
21	Austin Hill	Richard Childress Racing	Chevrolet
24	Kaz Grala (i)	Sam Hunt Racing	Toyota
25	Harrison Burton	AM Racing	Ford
26	Dean Thompson (R)	Sam Hunt Racing	Toyota
27	Jeb Burton	Jordan Anderson Racing	Chevrolet
28	Kyle Sieg	RSS Racing	Ford
31	Blaine Perkins	Jordan Anderson Racing	Chevrolet
32	Austin Green	Jordan Anderson Racing	Chevrolet
35	Glen Reen	Joey Gase Motorsports	Toyota
39	Ryan Sieg	RSS Racing	Ford
41	Sam Mayer	Haas Factory Team	Ford
42	Anthony Alfredo	Young's Motorsports	Chevrolet
44	Brennan Poole	Alpha Prime Racing	Chevrolet
45	Stefan Parsons (i)	Alpha Prime Racing	Chevrolet
48	Nick Sanchez (R)	Big Machine Racing	Chevrolet
51	Jeremy Clements	Jeremy Clements Racing	Chevrolet
53	Austin J. Hill	Joey Gase Motorsports	Chevrolet
54	Taylor Gray (R)	Joe Gibbs Racing	Toyota
70	Thomas Annunziata	Cope Family Racing	Chevrolet
71	Ryan Ellis	DGM Racing	Chevrolet
88	Connor Zilisch (R)	JR Motorsports	Chevrolet
91	Josh Bilicki	DGM Racing	Chevrolet
99	Matt DiBenedetto	Viking Motorsports	Chevrolet
Official entry list

== Practice ==
The first and only practice session was held on Saturday, August 9, at 9:30 AM EST, and would last for 50 minutes. Connor Zilisch, driving for JR Motorsports, would set the fastest time in the session, with a lap of 1:11.001, and a speed of 124.224 mph (199.919 km/h).

Pos.	#	Driver	Team	Make	Time	Speed
1	88	Connor Zilisch (R)	JR Motorsports	Chevrolet	1:11.001	124.224
2	8	Sammy Smith	JR Motorsports	Chevrolet	1:11.717	122.983
3	2	Jesse Love	Richard Childress Racing	Chevrolet	1:12.040	122.432
Full practice results

== Qualifying ==
Qualifying was held on Saturday, August 9, at 10:35 AM EST. Since Watkins Glen International is a road course, the qualifying procedure used is a two-group system, with one round. Drivers will be separated into two groups, A and B. Each driver will have multiple laps to set a time. Whoever sets the fastest time between both groups will win the pole.

Under a 2021 rule change, the timing line in road course qualifying is "not" the start-finish line. Instead, the timing line for qualifying will be set at the exit of Turn 9. Connor Zilisch, driving for JR Motorsports, would score the pole for the race, with a lap of 1:10.884, and a speed of 124.429 mph (200.249 km/h).

No drivers would fail to qualify.

=== Qualifying results ===
Pos.	#	Driver	Team	Make	Time	Speed
1	88	Connor Zilisch (R)	JR Motorsports	Chevrolet	1:10.884	124.429
2	9	Shane van Gisbergen (i)	JR Motorsports	Chevrolet	1:11.446	123.450
3	54	Taylor Gray (R)	Joe Gibbs Racing	Toyota	1:11.529	123.307
4	41	Sam Mayer	Haas Factory Team	Ford	1:11.602	123.181
5	18	William Sawalich (R)	Joe Gibbs Racing	Toyota	1:11.664	123.074
6	8	Sammy Smith	JR Motorsports	Chevrolet	1:11.709	122.997
7	48	Nick Sanchez (R)	Big Machine Racing	Chevrolet	1:11.721	122.977
8	24	Kaz Grala (i)	Sam Hunt Racing	Toyota	1:11.728	122.965
9	7	Justin Allgaier	JR Motorsports	Chevrolet	1:11.762	122.906
10	21	Austin Hill	Richard Childress Racing	Chevrolet	1:11.853	122.751
11	00	Sheldon Creed	Haas Factory Team	Ford	1:11.855	122.747
12	11	Michael McDowell (i)	Kaulig Racing	Chevrolet	1:11.927	122.624
13	20	Brandon Jones	Joe Gibbs Racing	Toyota	1:11.992	122.514
14	1	Carson Kvapil (R)	JR Motorsports	Chevrolet	1:12.076	122.371
15	2	Jesse Love	Richard Childress Racing	Chevrolet	1:12.107	122.318
16	19	Riley Herbst (i)	Joe Gibbs Racing	Toyota	1:12.138	122.266
17	25	Harrison Burton	AM Racing	Ford	1:12.139	122.264
18	32	Austin Green	Jordan Anderson Racing	Chevrolet	1:12.175	122.203
19	26	Dean Thompson (R)	Sam Hunt Racing	Toyota	1:12.296	121.998
20	42	Anthony Alfredo	Young's Motorsports	Chevrolet	1:12.462	121.719
21	10	Daniel Dye (R)	Kaulig Racing	Chevrolet	1:12.502	121.652
22	4	Parker Retzlaff	Alpha Prime Racing	Chevrolet	1:12.505	121.647
23	27	Jeb Burton	Jordan Anderson Racing	Chevrolet	1:12.547	121.576
24	99	Matt DiBenedetto	Viking Motorsports	Chevrolet	1:12.552	121.568
25	70	Thomas Annunziata	Cope Family Racing	Chevrolet	1:12.625	121.446
26	45	Stefan Parsons (i)	Alpha Prime Racing	Chevrolet	1:12.654	121.397
27	91	Josh Bilicki	DGM Racing	Chevrolet	1:12.677	121.359
28	28	Kyle Sieg	RSS Racing	Ford	1:12.716	121.294
29	39	Ryan Sieg	RSS Racing	Ford	1:12.719	121.289
30	51	Jeremy Clements	Jeremy Clements Racing	Chevrolet	1:12.791	121.169
31	44	Brennan Poole	Alpha Prime Racing	Chevrolet	1:12.843	121.082
32	31	Blaine Perkins	Jordan Anderson Racing	Chevrolet	1:13.029	120.774
Qualified by owner's points
33	71	Ryan Ellis	DGM Racing	Chevrolet	1:13.493	120.011
34	07	Preston Pardus	SS-Green Light Racing	Chevrolet	1:13.531	119.949
35	35	Glen Reen	Joey Gase Motorsports	Toyota	1:14.123	118.991
36	16	Christian Eckes (R)	Kaulig Racing	Chevrolet	–	–
37	14	Garrett Smithley	SS-Green Light Racing	Chevrolet	–	–
38	53	Austin J. Hill	Joey Gase Motorsports	Chevrolet	–	–
Official qualifying results
Official starting lineup

== Race results ==
Stage 1 Laps: 20

Pos.	#	Driver	Team	Make	Pts
1	7	Justin Allgaier	JR Motorsports	Chevrolet	10
2	54	Taylor Gray (R)	Joe Gibbs Racing	Toyota	9
3	00	Sheldon Creed	Haas Factory Team	Ford	8
4	48	Nick Sanchez (R)	Big Machine Racing	Chevrolet	7
5	2	Jesse Love	Richard Childress Racing	Chevrolet	6
6	25	Harrison Burton	AM Racing	Ford	5
7	26	Dean Thompson (R)	Sam Hunt Racing	Toyota	4
8	4	Parker Retzlaff	Alpha Prime Racing	Chevrolet	3
9	39	Ryan Sieg	RSS Racing	Ford	2
10	99	Matt DiBenedetto	Viking Motorsports	Ford	1

Stage 2 Laps: 20

Pos.	#	Driver	Team	Make	Pts
1	88	Connor Zilisch (R)	JR Motorsports	Chevrolet	10
2	9	Shane van Gisbergen (i)	JR Motorsports	Chevrolet	0
3	41	Sam Mayer	Haas Factory Team	Ford	8
4	21	Austin Hill	Richard Childress Racing	Chevrolet	7
5	1	Carson Kvapil (R)	JR Motorsports	Chevrolet	6
6	11	Michael McDowell (i)	Kaulig Racing	Chevrolet	0
7	00	Sheldon Creed	Haas Factory Team	Ford	4
8	7	Justin Allgaier	JR Motorsports	Chevrolet	3
9	8	Sammy Smith	JR Motorsports	Chevrolet	2
10	32	Austin Green	Jordan Anderson Racing	Chevrolet	1

Stage 3 Laps: 42

Fin	St	#	Driver	Team	Make	Laps	Led	Status	Pts
1	1	88	Connor Zilisch (R)	JR Motorsports	Chevrolet	82	60	Running	51
2	4	41	Sam Mayer	Haas Factory Team	Ford	82	0	Running	43
3	6	8	Sammy Smith	JR Motorsports	Chevrolet	82	1	Running	36
4	10	21	Austin Hill	Richard Childress Racing	Chevrolet	82	3	Running	40
5	14	1	Carson Kvapil (R)	JR Motorsports	Chevrolet	82	0	Running	38
6	9	7	Justin Allgaier	JR Motorsports	Chevrolet	82	3	Running	44
7	18	32	Austin Green	Jordan Anderson Racing	Chevrolet	82	0	Running	31
8	36	16	Christian Eckes (R)	Kaulig Racing	Chevrolet	82	0	Running	29
9	13	20	Brandon Jones	Joe Gibbs Racing	Toyota	82	0	Running	28
10	17	25	Harrison Burton	AM Racing	Ford	82	0	Running	32
11	8	24	Kaz Grala (i)	Sam Hunt Racing	Toyota	82	0	Running	0
12	31	44	Brennan Poole	Alpha Prime Racing	Chevrolet	82	0	Running	25
13	19	26	Dean Thompson (R)	Sam Hunt Racing	Toyota	82	0	Running	28
14	15	2	Jesse Love	Richard Childress Racing	Chevrolet	82	1	Running	29
15	30	51	Jeremy Clements	Jeremy Clements Racing	Chevrolet	82	0	Running	22
16	23	27	Jeb Burton	Jordan Anderson Racing	Chevrolet	82	0	Running	21
17	21	10	Daniel Dye (R)	Kaulig Racing	Chevrolet	82	0	Running	20
18	3	54	Taylor Gray (R)	Joe Gibbs Racing	Toyota	82	0	Running	28
19	26	45	Stefan Parsons (i)	Alpha Prime Racing	Chevrolet	82	0	Running	0
20	38	53	Austin J. Hill	Joey Gase Motorsports	Chevrolet	82	0	Running	17
21	35	35	Glen Reen	Joey Gase Motorsports	Toyota	82	0	Running	16
22	22	4	Parker Retzlaff	Alpha Prime Racing	Chevrolet	82	1	Running	18
23	32	31	Blaine Perkins	Jordan Anderson Racing	Chevrolet	80	0	Running	14
24	7	48	Nick Sanchez (R)	Big Machine Racing	Chevrolet	75	0	Accident	20
25	12	11	Michael McDowell (i)	Kaulig Racing	Chevrolet	73	1	Accident	0
26	5	18	William Sawalich (R)	Joe Gibbs Racing	Toyota	73	1	Accident	11
27	27	91	Josh Bilicki	DGM Racing	Chevrolet	73	0	Accident	10
28	29	39	Ryan Sieg	RSS Racing	Ford	73	0	Accident	11
29	33	71	Ryan Ellis	DGM Racing	Chevrolet	73	0	Accident	8
30	28	28	Kyle Sieg	RSS Racing	Ford	73	0	Accident	7
31	2	9	Shane van Gisbergen (i)	JR Motorsports	Chevrolet	64	11	Accident	0
32	20	42	Anthony Alfredo	Young's Motorsports	Chevrolet	63	0	Running	5
33	24	99	Matt DiBenedetto	Viking Motorsports	Chevrolet	52	0	Suspension	5
34	34	07	Preston Pardus	SS-Green Light Racing	Chevrolet	52	0	Running	3
35	11	00	Sheldon Creed	Haas Factory Team	Ford	50	0	Accident	14
36	16	19	Riley Herbst (i)	Joe Gibbs Racing	Toyota	39	0	Engine	0
37	25	70	Thomas Annunziata	Cope Family Racing	Chevrolet	24	0	Accident	1
38	37	14	Garrett Smithley	SS-Green Light Racing	Chevrolet	3	0	Engine	1
Official race results

== Standings after the race ==
Drivers' Championship standings

Pos	Driver	Points
1	Connor Zilisch	823
2	Justin Allgaier	816 (–7)
3	Sam Mayer	799 (–24)
4	Jesse Love	731 (–92)
5	Austin Hill	690 (–133)
6	Carson Kvapil	660 (–163)
7	Brandon Jones	646 (–177)
8	Sheldon Creed	625 (–198)
9	Taylor Gray	624 (–199)
10	Sammy Smith	603 (–220)
11	Harrison Burton	578 (–245)
12	Nick Sanchez	555 (–268)
Official driver's standings

Manufacturers' Championship standings

	Pos	Manufacturer	Points
	1	Chevrolet	900
1	2	Ford	741 (–159)
1	3	Toyota	740 (–160)

- Note: Only the first 12 positions are included for the driver standings.

Previous race: 2025 Hy-Vee PERKS 250	NASCAR Xfinity Series; 2025 season	Next race: 2025 Wawa 250
