= 2025 Wawa 250 =

24th race of the 2025 NASCAR Xfinity Series

2025 Wawa 250 Powered by Coca-Cola
Race details
- Race 24 of 33 of the 2025 NASCAR Xfinity Series
- Date: August 22, 2025
- Official name: 24th Annual Wawa 250 Powered by Coca-Cola
- Location: Daytona International Speedway in Daytona Beach, Florida
- Course: Permanent racing facility
- Course length: 2.5 miles (4.0 km)
- Distance: 104 laps, 260 mi (418 km)
- Scheduled distance: 100 laps, 250 mi (400 km)
- Average speed: 115.157 mph (185.327 km/h)

Pole position
Driver	Connor Zilisch	JR Motorsports
- Grid positions set by competition-based formula

Most laps led
Driver	Ryan Sieg	RSS Racing
- Laps: 19

Winner
No. 88	Connor Zilisch (Note: Parker Kligerman replaced Zilisch on lap 15 because of recuperation from a collarbone injury suffered at Watkins Glen two-weeks prior. Officially, Zilisch got credit for winning the race, but Kligerman drove the car to win)	JR Motorsports

Television in the United States
- Network: The CW
- Announcers: Adam Alexander and Jamie McMurray

Radio in the United States
- Radio: MRN

The 2025 Wawa 250 Powered by Coca-Cola was the 24th stock car race of the 2025 NASCAR Xfinity Series, and the 24th iteration of the event. The race was held on Friday, August 22, 2025, at Daytona International Speedway in Daytona Beach, Florida, a 2.5 miles (4.0 km) permanent quad-oval shaped superspeedway. The race was contested over 104 laps, extended from 100 laps due to an overtime finish.

In an action-packed race with numerous lead changes, Parker Kligerman, driving for JR Motorsports, won the race after replacing Connor Zilisch (injured at Watkins Glen two weeks prior) during a Lap 13 caution. Kligerman would survive late-race chaos and took the victory after a massive wreck brought out the caution on the final lap while leading. Because Zilisch started the race, he was officially credited with the win, marking the first time since the 2007 AT&T 250 that a relief driver won in the Xfinity Series. This was Zilisch's eighth career NASCAR Xfinity Series win, and his seventh of the season. Sammy Smith and Justin Allgaier finished 2nd and 3rd in a 1-2-3 finish for JRM respectively.

== Report ==
=== Background ===
Daytona International Speedway, the track where the race will be held.

The race will be held at Daytona International Speedway, a race track located in Daytona Beach, Florida, United States. Since opening in 1959, the track is the home of the Daytona 500, the most prestigious race in NASCAR. In addition to NASCAR, the track also hosts races of ARCA, AMA Superbike, USCC, SCCA, and Motocross. It features multiple layouts including the primary 2.5 miles (4.0 km) high speed tri-oval, a 3.56 miles (5.73 km) sports car course, a 2.95 miles (4.75 km) motorcycle course, and a .25 miles (0.40 km) karting and motorcycle flat-track. The track's 180-acre (73 ha) infield includes the 29-acre (12 ha) Lake Lloyd, which has hosted powerboat racing. The speedway is owned and operated by International Speedway Corporation.

The track was built in 1959 by NASCAR founder William "Bill" France, Sr. to host racing held at the former Daytona Beach Road Course. His banked design permitted higher speeds and gave fans a better view of the cars. Lights were installed around the track in 1998 and today, it is the third-largest single lit outdoor sports facility. The speedway has been renovated three times, with the infield renovated in 2004 and the track repaved twice — in 1978 and in 2010. On January 22, 2013, the track unveiled artist depictions of a renovated speedway. On July 5 of that year, ground was broken for a project that would remove the backstretch seating and completely redevelop the frontstretch seating. The renovation to the speedway is being worked on by Rossetti Architects. The project, named "Daytona Rising", was completed in January 2016, and it cost US $400 million, placing emphasis on improving fan experience with five expanded and redesigned fan entrances (called "injectors") as well as wider and more comfortable seating with more restrooms and concession stands. After the renovations, the track's grandstands include 101,000 permanent seats with the ability to increase permanent seating to 125,000. The project was completed before the start of Speedweeks.

=== Entry list ===
- (R) denotes rookie driver.
- (i) denotes driver who is ineligible for series driver points.

#	Driver	Team	Make
00	Sheldon Creed	Haas Factory Team	Ford
1	Carson Kvapil (R)	JR Motorsports	Chevrolet
2	Jesse Love	Richard Childress Racing	Chevrolet
4	Parker Retzlaff	Alpha Prime Racing	Chevrolet
5	Caesar Bacarella	Alpha Prime Racing	Chevrolet
07	Patrick Emerling (i)	SS-Green Light Racing	Chevrolet
7	Justin Allgaier	JR Motorsports	Chevrolet
8	Sammy Smith	JR Motorsports	Chevrolet
10	Daniel Dye (R)	Kaulig Racing	Chevrolet
11	Justin Haley (i)	Kaulig Racing	Chevrolet
14	Garrett Smithley	SS-Green Light Racing	Chevrolet
16	Christian Eckes (R)	Kaulig Racing	Chevrolet
18	William Sawalich (R)	Joe Gibbs Racing	Toyota
19	Aric Almirola	Joe Gibbs Racing	Toyota
20	Brandon Jones	Joe Gibbs Racing	Toyota
21	Austin Hill	Richard Childress Racing	Chevrolet
25	Harrison Burton	AM Racing	Ford
26	Dean Thompson (R)	Sam Hunt Racing	Toyota
27	Jeb Burton	Jordan Anderson Racing	Chevrolet
28	Kyle Sieg	RSS Racing	Ford
31	Blaine Perkins	Jordan Anderson Racing	Chevrolet
32	Rajah Caruth (i)	Jordan Anderson Racing	Chevrolet
35	Mason Maggio	Joey Gase Motorsports	Chevrolet
39	Ryan Sieg	RSS Racing	Ford
41	Sam Mayer	Haas Factory Team	Ford
42	Anthony Alfredo	Young's Motorsports	Chevrolet
44	Brennan Poole	Alpha Prime Racing	Chevrolet
45	Josh Williams	Alpha Prime Racing	Chevrolet
48	Nick Sanchez (R)	Big Machine Racing	Chevrolet
51	Jeremy Clements	Jeremy Clements Racing	Chevrolet
53	Joey Gase	Joey Gase Motorsports	Chevrolet
54	Taylor Gray (R)	Joe Gibbs Racing	Toyota
70	Leland Honeyman	Cope Family Racing	Chevrolet
71	Ryan Ellis	DGM Racing	Chevrolet
88	Connor Zilisch (R)	JR Motorsports	Chevrolet
91	Josh Bilicki	DGM Racing	Chevrolet
92	Natalie Decker	DGM Racing	Chevrolet
99	Matt DiBenedetto	Viking Motorsports	Chevrolet
Official entry list

== Starting lineup ==
Qualifying was originally scheduled to be held on Friday, August 22, at 3:00 PM EST, but was cancelled due to lightning strikes in the area. Since Daytona International Speedway is a superspeedway, the qualifying procedure used is a single-car, single-lap system with two rounds. In the first round, drivers will have one lap to set a time to determine positions 11–38. The fastest ten drivers from the first round move on to the second round, and whoever sets the fastest time in Round 2 will win the pole.

After 15 cars took a qualifying lap, lightning struck within the eight-mile radius of the track. Because the session was delayed earlier from lightning, and time constraints with Cup Series qualifying, the rest of the session was cancelled, and the starting lineup was determined by the performance metric system. As a result, Connor Zilisch, driving for JR Motorsports, was awarded the pole.

No drivers would fail to qualify.

=== Starting lineup ===
Pos.	#	Driver	Team	Make
1	88	Connor Zilisch (R)	JR Motorsports	Chevrolet
2	41	Sam Mayer	Haas Factory Team	Ford
3	8	Sammy Smith	JR Motorsports	Chevrolet
4	21	Austin Hill	Richard Childress Racing	Chevrolet
5	7	Justin Allgaier	JR Motorsports	Chevrolet
6	1	Carson Kvapil (R)	JR Motorsports	Chevrolet
7	20	Brandon Jones	Joe Gibbs Racing	Toyota
8	25	Harrison Burton	AM Racing	Ford
9	16	Christian Eckes (R)	Kaulig Racing	Chevrolet
10	2	Jesse Love	Richard Childress Racing	Chevrolet
11	26	Dean Thompson (R)	Sam Hunt Racing	Toyota
12	44	Brennan Poole	Alpha Prime Racing	Chevrolet
13	27	Jeb Burton	Jordan Anderson Racing	Chevrolet
14	54	Taylor Gray (R)	Joe Gibbs Racing	Toyota
15	32	Rajah Caruth (i)	Jordan Anderson Racing	Chevrolet
16	51	Jeremy Clements	Jeremy Clements Racing	Chevrolet
17	10	Daniel Dye (R)	Kaulig Racing	Chevrolet
18	48	Nick Sanchez (R)	Big Machine Racing	Chevrolet
19	4	Parker Retzlaff	Alpha Prime Racing	Chevrolet
20	45	Josh Williams	Alpha Prime Racing	Chevrolet
21	11	Justin Haley (i)	Kaulig Racing	Chevrolet
22	39	Ryan Sieg	RSS Racing	Ford
23	31	Blaine Perkins	Jordan Anderson Racing	Chevrolet
24	18	William Sawalich (R)	Joe Gibbs Racing	Toyota
25	53	Joey Gase	Joey Gase Motorsports	Chevrolet
26	35	Mason Maggio	Joey Gase Motorsports	Chevrolet
27	00	Sheldon Creed	Haas Factory Team	Ford
28	91	Josh Bilicki	DGM Racing	Chevrolet
29	19	Aric Almirola	Joe Gibbs Racing	Toyota
30	28	Kyle Sieg	RSS Racing	Ford
31	71	Ryan Ellis	Alpha Prime Racing	Chevrolet
32	42	Anthony Alfredo	Young's Motorsports	Chevrolet
Qualified by owner's points
33	99	Matt DiBenedetto	Viking Motorsports	Chevrolet
34	07	Patrick Emerling (i)	SS-Green Light Racing	Chevrolet
35	70	Leland Honeyman	Cope Family Racing	Chevrolet
36	14	Garrett Smithley	SS-Green Light Racing	Chevrolet
37	5	Caesar Bacarella	Alpha Prime Racing	Chevrolet
38	92	Natalie Decker	DGM Racing	Chevrolet
Official starting lineup

== Race results ==
Stage 1 Laps: 30

Pos.	#	Driver	Team	Make	Pts
1	8	Sammy Smith	JR Motorsports	Chevrolet	10
2	41	Sam Mayer	Haas Factory Team	Ford	9
3	99	Matt DiBenedetto	Viking Motorsports	Chevrolet	8
4	21	Austin Hill	Richard Childress Racing	Chevrolet	7
5	7	Justin Allgaier	JR Motorsports	Chevrolet	6
6	20	Brandon Jones	Joe Gibbs Racing	Toyota	5
7	16	Christian Eckes (R)	Kaulig Racing	Chevrolet	4
8	42	Anthony Alfredo	Young's Motorsports	Chevrolet	3
9	27	Jeb Burton	Jordan Anderson Racing	Chevrolet	2
10	18	William Sawalich (R)	Joe Gibbs Racing	Toyota	1

Stage 2 Laps: 30

Pos.	#	Driver	Team	Make	Pts
1	7	Justin Allgaier	JR Motorsports	Chevrolet	10
2	2	Jesse Love	Richard Childress Racing	Chevrolet	9
3	16	Christian Eckes (R)	Kaulig Racing	Chevrolet	8
4	21	Austin Hill	Richard Childress Racing	Chevrolet	7
5	00	Sheldon Creed	Haas Factory Team	Ford	6
6	26	Dean Thompson (R)	Sam Hunt Racing	Toyota	5
7	25	Harrison Burton	AM Racing	Ford	4
8	54	Taylor Gray (R)	Joe Gibbs Racing	Toyota	3
9	20	Brandon Jones	Joe Gibbs Racing	Toyota	2
10	39	Ryan Sieg	RSS Racing	Ford	1

Stage 3 Laps: 54

Fin	St	#	Driver	Team	Make	Laps	Led	Status	Pts
1	1	88	Connor Zilisch (R); Parker Kligerman (Note: Replaced Zilisch on Lap 15 to help him continue recovering from a broken collarbone suffered from a fall at Watkins Glen two weeks prior. Since Zilisch started the race, he is officially credited with the win.)	JR Motorsports	Chevrolet	104	12	Running	40
2	3	8	Sammy Smith	JR Motorsports	Chevrolet	104	18	Running	45
3	5	7	Justin Allgaier	JR Motorsports	Chevrolet	104	6	Running	50
4	10	2	Jesse Love	Richard Childress Racing	Chevrolet	104	14	Running	42
5	2	41	Sam Mayer	Haas Factory Team	Ford	104	16	Running	41
6	7	20	Brandon Jones	Joe Gibbs Racing	Toyota	104	0	Running	38
7	11	26	Dean Thompson (R)	Sam Hunt Racing	Toyota	104	0	Running	35
8	36	14	Garrett Smithley	SS-Green Light Racing	Chevrolet	104	1	Running	29
9	12	44	Brennan Poole	Alpha Prime Racing	Chevrolet	104	0	Running	28
10	6	1	Carson Kvapil (R)	JR Motorsports	Chevrolet	104	0	Running	27
11	31	71	Ryan Ellis	DGM Racing	Chevrolet	104	0	Running	26
12	24	18	William Sawalich (R)	Joe Gibbs Racing	Toyota	104	0	Running	26
13	34	07	Patrick Emerling (i)	SS-Green Light Racing	Chevrolet	104	0	Running	0
14	23	31	Blaine Perkins	Jordan Anderson Racing	Chevrolet	104	0	Running	23
15	26	35	Mason Maggio	Joey Gase Motorsports	Chevrolet	104	0	Running	22
16	8	25	Harrison Burton	AM Racing	Ford	104	0	Running	25
17	27	00	Sheldon Creed	Haas Factory Team	Ford	104	3	Running	26
18	28	91	Josh Bilicki	DGM Racing	Chevrolet	104	0	Running	19
19	21	11	Justin Haley (i)	Kaulig Racing	Chevrolet	104	7	Running	0
20	13	27	Jeb Burton	Jordan Anderson Racing	Chevrolet	104	0	Running	19
21	25	53	Joey Gase	Joey Gase Motorsports	Chevrolet	104	0	Running	16
22	38	92	Natalie Decker	DGM Racing	Chevrolet	104	0	Running	15
23	18	48	Nick Sanchez (R)	Big Machine Racing	Chevrolet	104	0	Running	14
24	29	19	Aric Almirola	Joe Gibbs Racing	Toyota	103	0	Accident	14
25	4	21	Austin Hill	Richard Childress Racing	Chevrolet	103	8	Accident	26
26	35	70	Leland Honeyman	Cope Family Racing	Chevrolet	103	0	Accident	11
27	30	28	Kyle Sieg	RSS Racing	Ford	103	0	Accident	10
28	37	5	Caesar Bacarella	Alpha Prime Racing	Chevrolet	103	0	Running	9
29	15	32	Rajah Caruth (i)	Jordan Anderson Racing	Chevrolet	102	0	Running	0
30	14	54	Taylor Gray (R)	Joe Gibbs Racing	Toyota	101	0	Running	10
31	22	39	Ryan Sieg	RSS Racing	Ford	98	19	Accident	7
32	9	16	Christian Eckes (R)	Kaulig Racing	Chevrolet	97	0	Accident	17
33	33	99	Matt DiBenedetto	Viking Motorsports	Chevrolet	96	0	Accident	12
34	20	45	Josh Williams	Alpha Prime Racing	Chevrolet	96	0	Accident	3
35	17	10	Daniel Dye (R)	Kaulig Racing	Chevrolet	96	0	Accident	2
36	16	51	Jeremy Clements	Jeremy Clements Racing	Chevrolet	89	0	Accident	1
37	32	42	Anthony Alfredo	Young's Motorsports	Chevrolet	67	0	Electrical	4
38	19	4	Parker Retzlaff	Alpha Prime Racing	Chevrolet	30	0	Water Pump	1
Official race results

== Standings after the race ==
Drivers' Championship standings

	Pos	Driver	Points
1	1	Justin Allgaier	866
1	2	Connor Zilisch	863 (–3)
	3	Sam Mayer	840 (–26)
	4	Jesse Love	773 (–93)
	5	Austin Hill	716 (–150)
	6	Carson Kvapil	687 (–179)
	7	Brandon Jones	684 (–182)
	8	Sheldon Creed	651 (–215)
1	9	Sammy Smith	648 (–218)
1	10	Taylor Gray	634 (–232)
	11	Harrison Burton	603 (–263)
	12	Nick Sanchez	569 (–297)
Official driver's standings

Manufacturers' Championship standings

Pos	Manufacturer	Points
1	Chevrolet	945
2	Ford	772 (–173)
3	Toyota	766 (–179)

- Note: Only the first 12 positions are included for the driver standings.

== Notes ==
Previous race: 2025 Mission 200 at The Glen	NASCAR Xfinity Series; 2025 season	Next race: 2025 Pacific Office Automation 147
