= 2025 Pennzoil 250 =

21st race of the 2025 NASCAR Xfinity Series

Race details
- Race 21 of 33 of the 2025 NASCAR Xfinity Series
- Date: July 26, 2025
- Official name: 14th Annual Pennzoil 250
- Location: Indianapolis Motor Speedway in Speedway, Indiana
- Course: Permanent racing facility
- Course length: 2.5 miles (4.0 km)
- Distance: 100 laps, 250 mi (400 km)
- Scheduled distance: 100 laps, 250 mi (400 km)
- Average speed: 104.907 mph (168.831 km/h)

Pole position
Driver	Sam Mayer	Haas Factory Team
- Time: 54.014

Most laps led
Driver	Justin Allgaier	JR Motorsports
- Laps: 37

Winner
No. 88	Connor Zilisch	JR Motorsports

Television in the United States
- Network: The CW
- Announcers: Adam Alexander, Parker Kligerman, and Jamie McMurray

Radio in the United States
- Radio: IMS

The 2025 Pennzoil 250 was the 21st stock car race of the 2025 NASCAR Xfinity Series, and the 14th iteration of the event. The race was held on Saturday, July 26, 2025, at Indianapolis Motor Speedway in Speedway, Indiana, a 2.5 miles (4.0 km) permanent square-shaped racetrack. The race took the scheduled 100 laps to complete.

In a wild race with late controversy, Connor Zilisch, driving for JR Motorsports, would make a late pass on Taylor Gray for the lead with two laps to go, and held off Sam Mayer on the final lap to earn his sixth career NASCAR Xfinity Series win, his fifth of the season, and his third consecutive win. This was also the 100th victory for JR Motorsports in the Xfinity Series. Mayer finished in second, followed by Gray in third, with Kyle Larson and Ryan Sieg rounding out the top five.

Throughout the late stages of the race, controversy ensured after an incident involving Austin Hill and Aric Almirola. With five laps to go, Almirola rebounded from a bad pit stop and made his way back into the top five. Coming out of turn three, Almirola bumped into the back of Hill, getting him loose and sending him up the track. As Hill corrected himself, he came down onto the track, hooking Almirola in his right-rear quarter panel, sending him head-on into the outside wall. Almirola was evaluated and released from the infield care center, and described it as "one of the hardest hits he's taken in his NASCAR career." Hill was eventually given a five-lap penalty from NASCAR for reckless driving, he was credited with a 34th-place finish, five laps down.

== Report ==
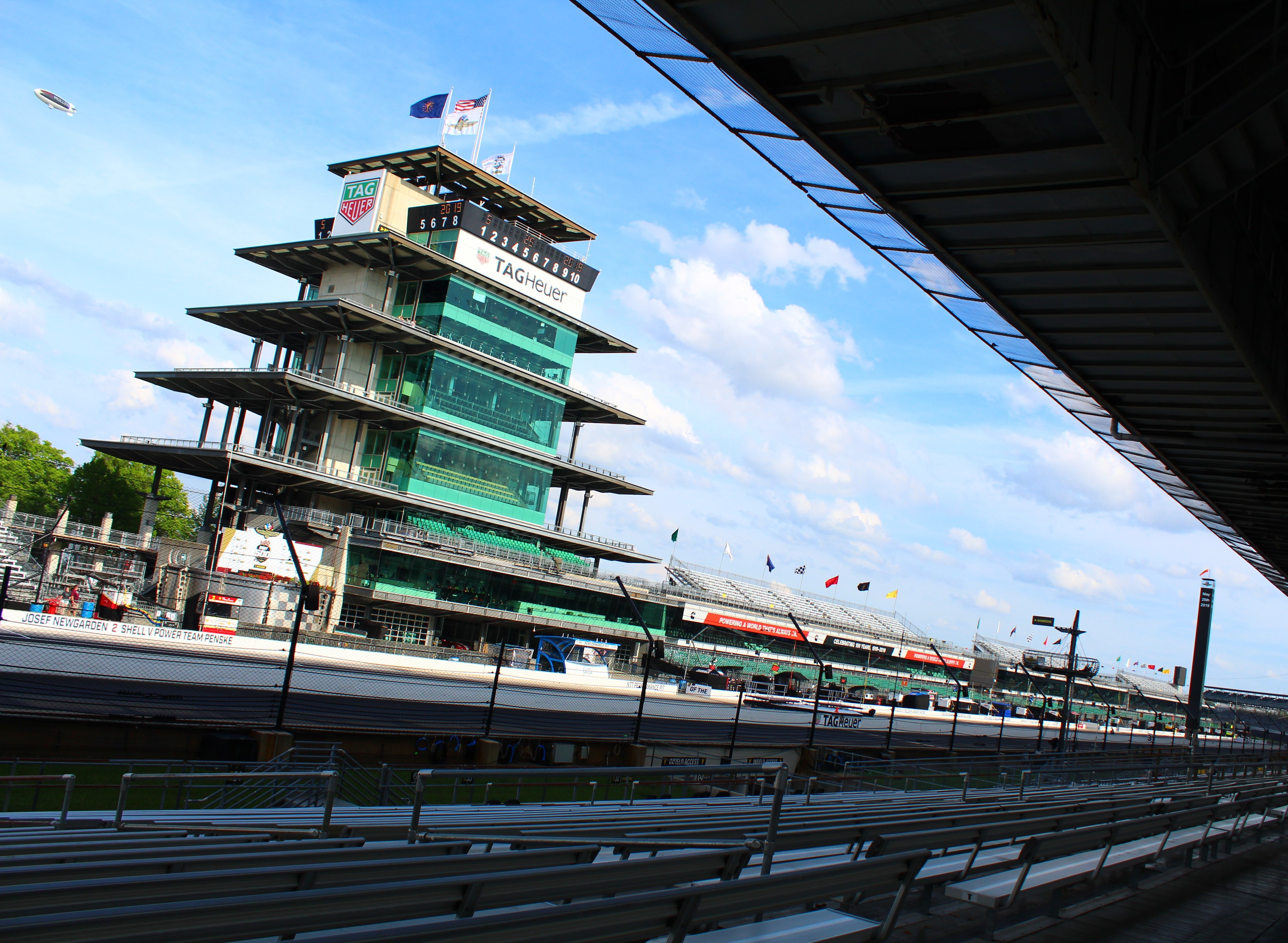
The Pagoda, the control tower, which houses officials, broadcasting, and hospitality suites, is an icon at the Indianapolis Motor Speedway.

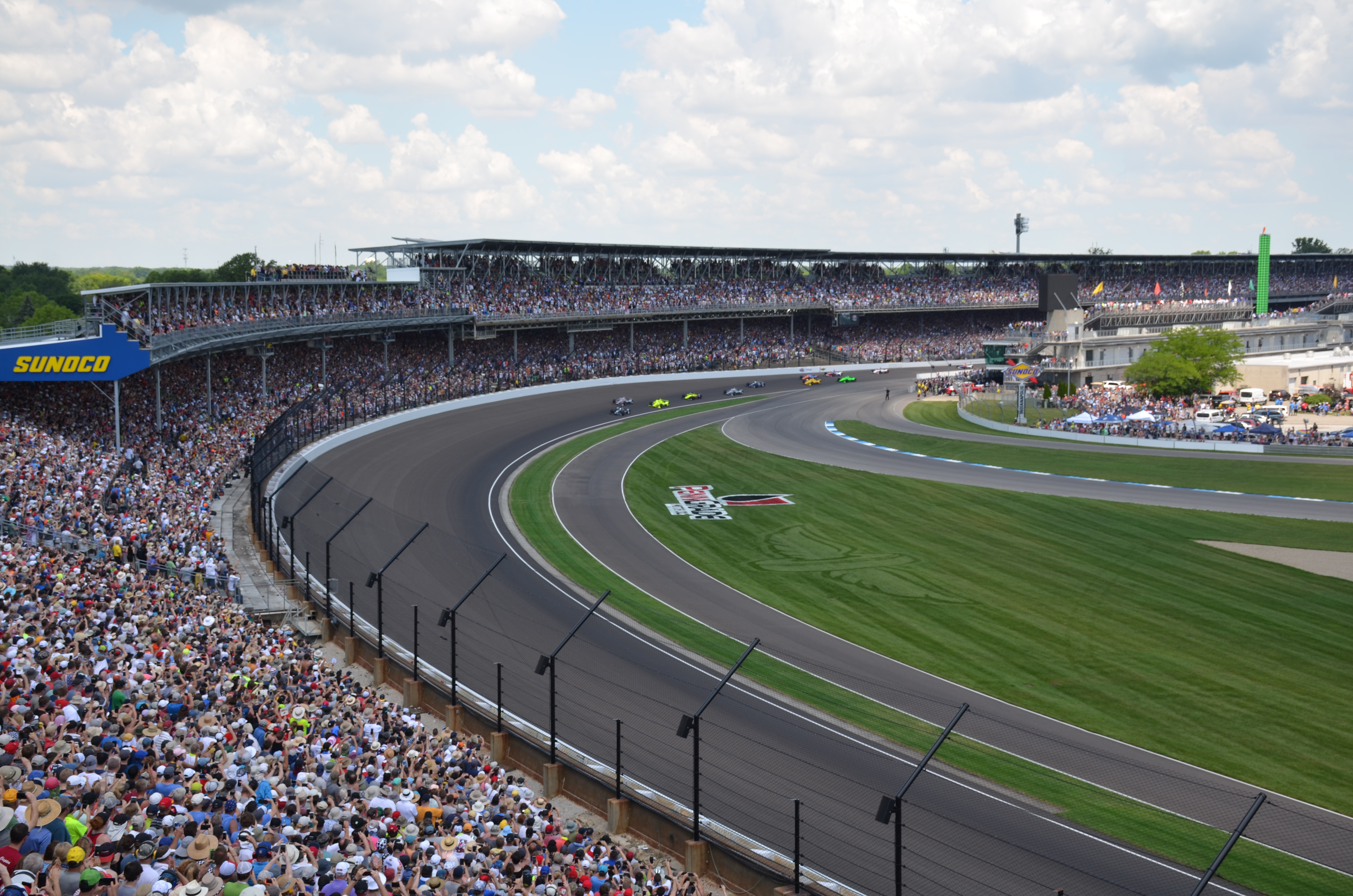
Turn one at the Indianapolis Motor Speedway.

The Indianapolis Motor Speedway, located in Speedway, Indiana, (an enclave suburb of Indianapolis) in the United States, is the home of the Indianapolis 500 of IndyCar Series and the Brickyard 400 of the NASCAR Cup Series. It is located on the corner of 16th Street and Georgetown Road, approximately six miles (10 km) west of Downtown Indianapolis.

Constructed in 1909, it is the original speedway, the first racing facility so named. It has a permanent seating capacity estimated at 235,000 with infield seating raising capacity to an approximate 400,000. It is the highest-capacity sports venue in the world.

Considered relatively flat by American standards, the track is a 2.5-mile (4.0 km), nearly rectangular oval with dimensions that have remained essentially unchanged since its inception: four 0.25-mile (0.40 km) turns, two 0.625-mile-long (1.006 km) straightaways between the fourth and first turns and the second and third turns, and two .125-mile (0.201 km) short straightaways – termed "short chutes" – between the first and second, and third and fourth turns.

The track also holds races on its infield road course, formerly the Verizon 200 at the Brickyard, from 2021 to 2023 in the Cup Series, the Pennzoil 150, in the Xfinity Series, and currently the Sonsio Grand Prix in IndyCar.

=== Entry list ===
- (R) denotes rookie driver.
- (i) denotes driver who is ineligible for series driver points.

#	Driver	Team	Make
00	Sheldon Creed	Haas Factory Team	Ford
1	Carson Kvapil (R)	JR Motorsports	Chevrolet
2	Jesse Love	Richard Childress Racing	Chevrolet
4	Parker Retzlaff	Alpha Prime Racing	Chevrolet
07	Logan Bearden	SS-Green Light Racing	Chevrolet
7	Justin Allgaier	JR Motorsports	Chevrolet
8	Sammy Smith	JR Motorsports	Chevrolet
10	Daniel Dye (R)	Kaulig Racing	Chevrolet
11	Josh Williams	Kaulig Racing	Chevrolet
14	Garrett Smithley	SS-Green Light Racing	Chevrolet
16	Christian Eckes (R)	Kaulig Racing	Chevrolet
17	Kyle Larson (i)	Hendrick Motorsports	Chevrolet
18	William Sawalich (R)	Joe Gibbs Racing	Toyota
19	Aric Almirola	Joe Gibbs Racing	Toyota
20	Brandon Jones	Joe Gibbs Racing	Toyota
21	Austin Hill	Richard Childress Racing	Chevrolet
25	Harrison Burton	AM Racing	Ford
26	Dean Thompson (R)	Sam Hunt Racing	Toyota
27	Jeb Burton	Jordan Anderson Racing	Chevrolet
28	Kyle Sieg	RSS Racing	Ford
31	Blaine Perkins	Jordan Anderson Racing	Chevrolet
32	Katherine Legge (i)	Jordan Anderson Racing	Chevrolet
35	David Starr	Joey Gase Motorsports	Chevrolet
39	Ryan Sieg	RSS Racing	Ford
41	Sam Mayer	Haas Factory Team	Ford
42	Anthony Alfredo	Young's Motorsports	Chevrolet
44	Brennan Poole	Alpha Prime Racing	Chevrolet
45	Mason Massey	Alpha Prime Racing	Chevrolet
48	Nick Sanchez (R)	Big Machine Racing	Chevrolet
51	Jeremy Clements	Jeremy Clements Racing	Chevrolet
53	Joey Gase	Joey Gase Motorsports	Chevrolet
54	Taylor Gray (R)	Joe Gibbs Racing	Toyota
70	Leland Honeyman	Cope Family Racing	Chevrolet
71	Ryan Ellis	DGM Racing	Chevrolet
74	Dawson Cram	Mike Harmon Racing	Chevrolet
88	Connor Zilisch (R)	JR Motorsports	Chevrolet
91	Josh Bilicki	DGM Racing	Chevrolet
99	Matt DiBenedetto	Viking Motorsports	Chevrolet
Official entry list

== Practice ==
The first and only practice session was held on Friday, July 25, at 12:05 PM EST, and would last for 50 minutes. Connor Zilisch, driving for JR Motorsports, would set the fastest time in the session, with a lap of 54.013, and a speed of 166.627 mph (268.160 km/h).

Pos.	#	Driver	Team	Make	Time	Speed
1	88	Connor Zilisch (R)	JR Motorsports	Chevrolet	54.013	166.627
2	1	Carson Kvapil (R)	JR Motorsports	Chevrolet	54.502	165.132
3	41	Sam Mayer	Haas Factory Team	Ford	54.566	164.938
Full practice results

== Qualifying ==
Qualifying was held on Saturday, July 26, at 1:00 PM EST. Standard intermediate track qualifying was in effect, although at Indianapolis, a hybrid road course qualifying rule was used. The timing line was set in Turn 3, where cars exited pit road, drove five-eights of a lap, then took the green flag in the north chute exiting Turn 3, and completing their lap there the next time by. Teams then immediately pitted the car, meaning only two laps were run. In addition, up to two cars could be at the track at one time, separated by considerable intervals (about 20 seconds) to ensure drafting was prohibited.

Sam Mayer, driving for Haas Factory Team, would score the pole for the race, with a lap of 54.014, and a speed of 166.623 mph (268.154 km/h).

No drivers would fail to qualify.

=== Qualifying results ===
Pos.	#	Driver	Team	Make	Time	Speed
1	41	Sam Mayer	Haas Factory Team	Ford	54.014	166.623
2	48	Nick Sanchez (R)	Big Machine Racing	Chevrolet	54.060	166.482
3	00	Sheldon Creed	Haas Factory Team	Ford	54.098	166.365
4	2	Jesse Love	Richard Childress Racing	Chevrolet	54.104	166.346
5	20	Brandon Jones	Joe Gibbs Racing	Toyota	54.117	166.306
6	19	Aric Almirola	Joe Gibbs Racing	Toyota	54.118	166.303
7	88	Connor Zilisch (R)	JR Motorsports	Chevrolet	54.196	166.064
8	7	Justin Allgaier	JR Motorsports	Chevrolet	54.204	166.039
9	18	William Sawalich (R)	Joe Gibbs Racing	Toyota	54.286	165.789
10	1	Carson Kvapil (R)	JR Motorsports	Chevrolet	54.371	165.529
11	8	Sammy Smith	JR Motorsports	Chevrolet	54.463	165.250
12	51	Jeremy Clements	Jeremy Clements Racing	Chevrolet	54.470	165.229
13	21	Austin Hill	Richard Childress Racing	Chevrolet	54.477	165.207
14	54	Taylor Gray (R)	Joe Gibbs Racing	Toyota	54.488	165.174
15	16	Christian Eckes (R)	Kaulig Racing	Chevrolet	54.534	165.035
16	26	Dean Thompson (R)	Sam Hunt Racing	Toyota	54.558	164.962
17	70	Leland Honeyman	Cope Family Racing	Chevrolet	54.569	164.929
18	17	Kyle Larson (i)	Hendrick Motorsports	Chevrolet	54.641	164.711
19	10	Daniel Dye (R)	Kaulig Racing	Chevrolet	54.641	164.711
20	25	Harrison Burton	AM Racing	Ford	54.678	164.600
21	39	Ryan Sieg	RSS Racing	Ford	54.700	164.534
22	42	Anthony Alfredo	Young's Motorsports	Chevrolet	54.710	164.504
23	27	Jeb Burton	Jordan Anderson Racing	Chevrolet	54.749	164.387
24	32	Katherine Legge (i)	Jordan Anderson Racing	Chevrolet	55.026	163.559
25	99	Matt DiBenedetto	Viking Motorsports	Chevrolet	55.051	163.485
26	4	Parker Retzlaff	Alpha Prime Racing	Chevrolet	55.066	163.440
27	44	Brennan Poole	Alpha Prime Racing	Chevrolet	55.169	163.135
28	28	Kyle Sieg	RSS Racing	Ford	55.177	163.111
29	31	Blaine Perkins	Jordan Anderson Racing	Chevrolet	55.364	162.561
30	91	Josh Bilicki	DGM Racing	Chevrolet	55.365	162.558
31	11	Josh Williams	Kaulig Racing	Chevrolet	55.371	162.540
32	14	Garrett Smithley	SS-Green Light Racing	Chevrolet	55.416	162.408
Qualified by owner's points
33	45	Mason Massey	Alpha Prime Racing	Chevrolet	55.782	161.342
34	71	Ryan Ellis	DGM Racing	Chevrolet	55.899	161.005
35	07	Logan Bearden	SS-Green Light Racing	Chevrolet	56.540	159.179
36	53	Joey Gase	Joey Gase Motorsports	Chevrolet	56.767	158.543
37	74	Dawson Cram	Mike Harmon Racing	Chevrolet	57.122	157.558
38	35	David Starr	Joey Gase Motorsports	Chevrolet	57.907	155.422
Official qualifying results
Official starting lineup

== Race results ==
Stage 1 Laps: 30

Pos.	#	Driver	Team	Make	Pts
1	41	Sam Mayer	Haas Factory Team	Ford	10
2	7	Justin Allgaier	JR Motorsports	Chevrolet	9
3	19	Aric Almirola	Joe Gibbs Racing	Toyota	8
4	20	Brandon Jones	Joe Gibbs Racing	Toyota	7
5	88	Connor Zilisch (R)	JR Motorsports	Chevrolet	6
6	00	Sheldon Creed	Haas Factory Team	Ford	5
7	2	Jesse Love	Richard Childress Racing	Chevrolet	4
8	17	Kyle Larson (i)	Hendrick Motorsports	Chevrolet	0
9	54	Taylor Gray (R)	Joe Gibbs Racing	Toyota	2
10	1	Carson Kvapil (R)	JR Motorsports	Chevrolet	1

Stage 2 Laps: 30

Pos.	#	Driver	Team	Make	Pts
1	7	Justin Allgaier	JR Motorsports	Chevrolet	10
2	88	Connor Zilisch (R)	JR Motorsports	Chevrolet	9
3	17	Kyle Larson (i)	Hendrick Motorsports	Chevrolet	0
4	19	Aric Almirola	Joe Gibbs Racing	Toyota	7
5	54	Taylor Gray (R)	Joe Gibbs Racing	Toyota	6
6	20	Brandon Jones	Joe Gibbs Racing	Toyota	5
7	41	Sam Mayer	Haas Factory Team	Ford	4
8	1	Carson Kvapil (R)	JR Motorsports	Chevrolet	3
9	2	Jesse Love	Richard Childress Racing	Chevrolet	2
10	18	William Sawalich (R)	Joe Gibbs Racing	Toyota	1

Stage 3 Laps: 40

Fin	St	#	Driver	Team	Make	Laps	Led	Status	Pts
1	7	88	Connor Zilisch (R)	JR Motorsports	Chevrolet	100	19	Running	55
2	1	41	Sam Mayer	Haas Factory Team	Ford	100	32	Running	50
3	14	54	Taylor Gray (R)	Joe Gibbs Racing	Toyota	100	3	Running	42
4	19	17	Kyle Larson (i)	Hendrick Motorsports	Chevrolet	100	7	Running	0
5	21	39	Ryan Sieg	RSS Racing	Ford	100	0	Running	32
6	9	18	William Sawalich (R)	Joe Gibbs Racing	Toyota	100	0	Running	32
7	11	8	Sammy Smith	JR Motorsports	Chevrolet	100	0	Running	30
8	18	10	Daniel Dye (R)	Kaulig Racing	Chevrolet	100	0	Running	29
9	4	2	Jesse Love	Richard Childress Racing	Chevrolet	100	0	Running	34
10	16	26	Dean Thompson (R)	Sam Hunt Racing	Toyota	100	0	Running	27
11	25	99	Matt DiBenedetto	Viking Motorsports	Chevrolet	100	0	Running	26
12	12	51	Jeremy Clements	Jeremy Clements Racing	Chevrolet	100	0	Running	25
13	15	16	Christian Eckes (R)	Kaulig Racing	Chevrolet	100	0	Running	24
14	26	4	Parker Retzlaff	Alpha Prime Racing	Chevrolet	100	0	Running	23
15	23	27	Jeb Burton	Jordan Anderson Racing	Chevrolet	100	0	Running	22
16	28	28	Kyle Sieg	RSS Racing	Ford	100	0	Running	21
17	3	00	Sheldon Creed	Haas Factory Team	Ford	100	0	Running	25
18	20	25	Harrison Burton	AM Racing	Ford	100	0	Running	19
19	30	91	Josh Bilicki	DGM Racing	Chevrolet	100	0	Running	18
20	27	44	Brennan Poole	Alpha Prime Racing	Chevrolet	100	0	Running	17
21	34	71	Ryan Ellis	DGM Racing	Chevrolet	100	0	Running	16
22	31	11	Josh Williams	Kaulig Racing	Chevrolet	100	0	Running	15
23	22	42	Anthony Alfredo	Young's Motorsports	Chevrolet	100	0	Running	14
24	33	45	Mason Massey	Alpha Prime Racing	Chevrolet	100	0	Running	13
25	32	14	Garrett Smithley	SS-Green Light Racing	Chevrolet	100	0	Running	12
26	17	70	Leland Honeyman	Cope Family Racing	Chevrolet	100	0	Running	11
27	29	31	Blaine Perkins	Jordan Anderson Racing	Chevrolet	100	0	Running	10
28	36	53	Joey Gase	Joey Gase Motorsports	Chevrolet	100	0	Running	9
29	38	35	David Starr	Joey Gase Motorsports	Chevrolet	100	0	Running	8
30	10	1	Carson Kvapil (R)	JR Motorsports	Chevrolet	100	0	Running	11
31	37	74	Dawson Cram	Mike Harmon Racing	Chevrolet	100	0	Running	6
32	5	20	Brandon Jones	Joe Gibbs Racing	Toyota	97	0	Running	17
33	2	48	Nick Sanchez (R)	Big Machine Racing	Chevrolet	96	0	Running	4
34	13	21	Austin Hill	Richard Childress Racing	Chevrolet	95	0	Running	3
35	6	19	Aric Almirola	Joe Gibbs Racing	Toyota	90	2	Accident	17
36	8	7	Justin Allgaier	JR Motorsports	Chevrolet	87	37	Accident	20
37	24	32	Katherine Legge (i)	Jordan Anderson Racing	Chevrolet	74	0	Electrical	0
38	35	07	Logan Bearden	SS-Green Light Racing	Chevrolet	37	0	Electrical	1
Official race results

== Standings after the race ==
Drivers' Championship standings

	Pos	Driver	Points
	1	Justin Allgaier	750
	2	Connor Zilisch	729 (–21)
	3	Sam Mayer	702 (–48)
1	4	Jesse Love	654 (–96)
1	5	Austin Hill	650 (–100)
	6	Brandon Jones	595 (–155)
	7	Carson Kvapil	587 (–163)
	8	Sheldon Creed	576 (–174)
	9	Taylor Gray	568 (–182)
	10	Sammy Smith	545 (–205)
1	11	Jeb Burton	519 (–231)
1	12	Nick Sanchez	517 (–233)
Official driver's standings

Manufacturers' Championship standings

Pos	Manufacturer	Points
1	Chevrolet	825
2	Toyota	686 (–139)
3	Ford	666 (–159)

- Note: Only the first 12 positions are included for the driver standings.

Previous race: 2025 BetRivers 200	NASCAR Xfinity Series; 2025 season	Next race: 2025 Hy-Vee PERKS 250
