= 2026 Cook Out Southern 500 =

NASCAR Cup Series race

Race details
- Race 27 of 36 in the 2026 NASCAR Cup Series
- Date: September 6, 2026
- Location: Darlington Raceway in Darlington, South Carolina
- Course: Permanent racing facility
- Course length: 1.366 miles (2.198 km)
- Distance: 367 laps, 501.322 mi (806.800 km)
- Average speed: 123.741 miles per hour (199.142 km/h)

Pole position
Driver	Tyler Reddick	23XI Racing
- Grid positions set by competition-based formula

Most laps led
Driver	Kyle Larson	Hendrick Motorsports
- Laps: 94

Fastest lap
Driver	Christopher Bell	Joe Gibbs Racing
- Time: 29.936

Winner
No. 20	Christopher Bell	Joe Gibbs Racing

Television in the United States
- Network: USA
- Announcers: Leigh Diffey, Jeff Burton and Steve Letarte

Radio in the United States
- Radio: MRN
- Booth announcers: Alex Hayden, Mike Bagley, and Todd Gordon
- Turn announcers: Dave Moody (1 & 2) and Tim Catalfamo (3 & 4)

The 2026 Cook Out Southern 500 was a NASCAR Cup Series race held on September 6, 2026, at Darlington Raceway in Darlington, South Carolina on the 1.366-mile (2.198 km) egg-shaped asphalt oval, it was the 27th race of the 2026 NASCAR Cup Series season, the first race of the NASCAR Chase, and 77th running of the event.

Christopher Bell won the race. Ty Gibbs finished 2nd, and Tyler Reddick finished 3rd. Ryan Blaney and Kyle Larson rounded out the top five, and Chase Briscoe, Josh Berry, Bubba Wallace, Joey Logano, and Ryan Preece rounded out the top ten.

== Report ==
=== Background ===
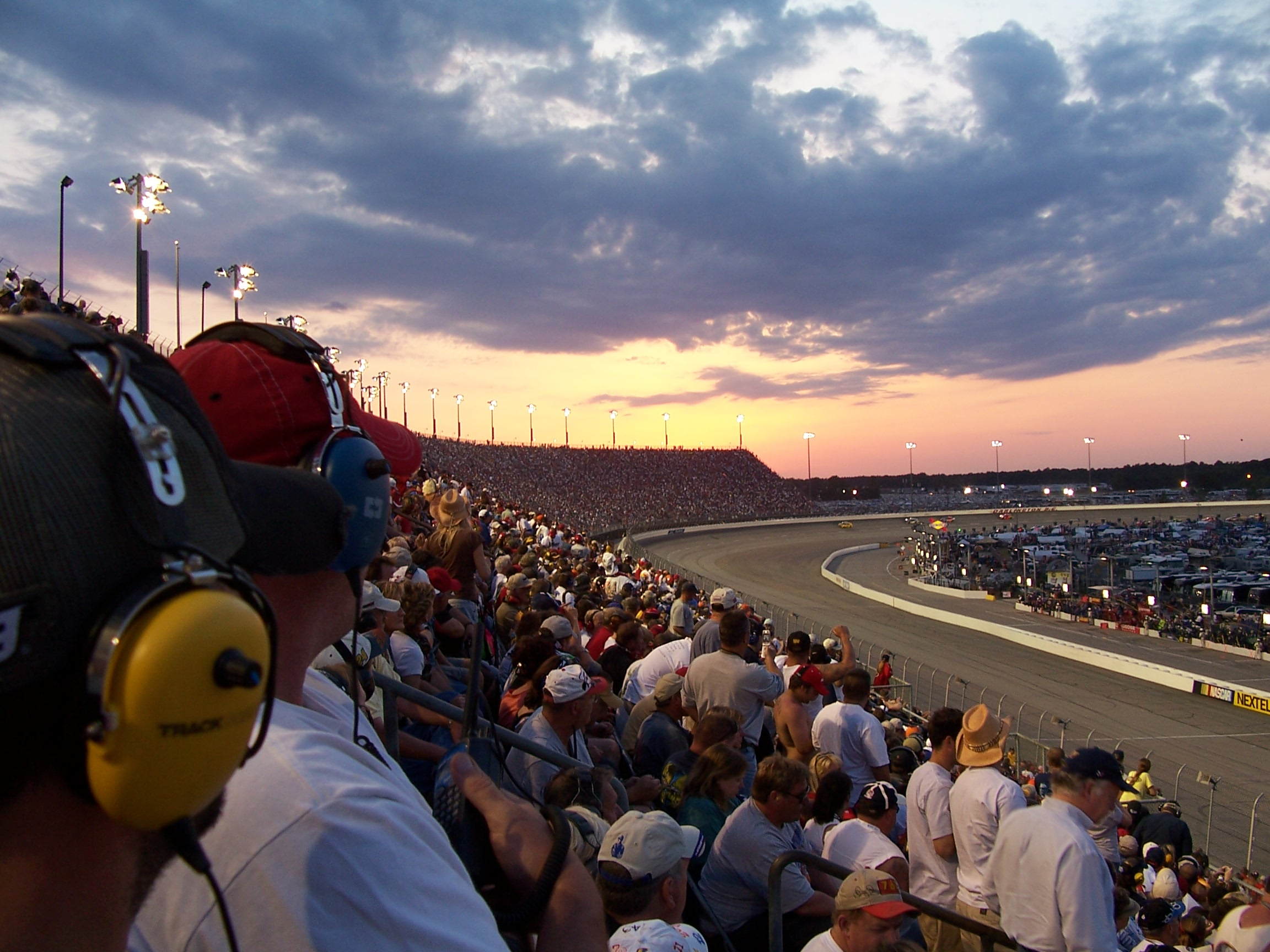
Darlington Raceway where the race was held.

Darlington Raceway is a race track built for NASCAR racing located near Darlington, South Carolina. It is nicknamed "The Lady in Black" and "The Track Too Tough to Tame" by many NASCAR fans and also the drivers and advertised as "A NASCAR Tradition." It is of a unique, somewhat egg-shaped by design, an oval with the ends of very different configurations, a condition which supposedly arose from the proximity of one end of the track to a minnow pond the owner refused to relocate. This situation makes it very challenging for the crews to set up their cars' handling in a way that is effective at both ends of the track.

During the offseason, NASCAR announced that Darlington would now get the short track package, as opposed to running the intermediate package from previous years.

==== Entry list ====
- (R) denotes rookie driver.
- (i) denotes driver who is ineligible for series driver points.
- (CC) denotes chase contender.

No.	Driver	Team	Manufacturer
1	Ross Chastain	Trackhouse Racing	Chevrolet
2	Austin Cindric (CC)	Team Penske	Ford
3	Austin Dillon	Richard Childress Racing	Chevrolet
4	Noah Gragson	Front Row Motorsports	Ford
5	Kyle Larson (CC)	Hendrick Motorsports	Chevrolet
6	Brad Keselowski	RFK Racing	Ford
7	Daniel Suárez (CC)	Spire Motorsports	Chevrolet
9	Chase Elliott (CC)	Hendrick Motorsports	Chevrolet
10	Ty Dillon	Kaulig Racing	Chevrolet
11	Denny Hamlin (CC)	Joe Gibbs Racing	Toyota
12	Ryan Blaney (CC)	Team Penske	Ford
16	A. J. Allmendinger	Kaulig Racing	Chevrolet
17	Chris Buescher (CC)	RFK Racing	Ford
19	Chase Briscoe (CC)	Joe Gibbs Racing	Toyota
20	Christopher Bell (CC)	Joe Gibbs Racing	Toyota
21	Josh Berry	Wood Brothers Racing	Ford
22	Joey Logano (CC)	Team Penske	Ford
23	Bubba Wallace (CC)	23XI Racing	Toyota
24	William Byron (CC)	Hendrick Motorsports	Chevrolet
33	Austin Hill (i)	Richard Childress Racing	Chevrolet
34	Todd Gilliland	Front Row Motorsports	Ford
35	Riley Herbst	23XI Racing	Toyota
38	Zane Smith	Front Row Motorsports	Ford
41	Cole Custer	Haas Factory Team	Ford
42	John Hunter Nemechek	Legacy Motor Club	Toyota
43	Erik Jones	Legacy Motor Club	Toyota
45	Tyler Reddick (CC)	23XI Racing	Toyota
47	Ricky Stenhouse Jr.	Hyak Motorsports	Chevrolet
48	Alex Bowman	Hendrick Motorsports	Chevrolet
51	Cody Ware	Rick Ware Racing	Chevrolet
54	Ty Gibbs	Joe Gibbs Racing	Toyota
60	Ryan Preece (CC)	RFK Racing	Ford
66	Chad Finchum (i)	Garage 66	Ford
67	Corey Heim (i)	23XI Racing	Toyota
71	Michael McDowell	Spire Motorsports	Chevrolet
77	Carson Hocevar (CC)	Spire Motorsports	Chevrolet
88	Connor Zilisch (R)	Trackhouse Racing	Chevrolet
97	Shane van Gisbergen	Trackhouse Racing	Chevrolet
Official entry list

== Qualifying ==
Qualifying for the race was canceled due to inclement weather. Tyler Reddick was awarded the pole for the race as a result of NASCAR's pandemic formula with a score of 3.000.

=== Starting lineup ===
Pos	No.	Driver	Team	Manufacturer
1	45	Tyler Reddick (CC)	23XI Racing	Toyota
2	7	Daniel Suárez (CC)	Spire Motorsports	Chevrolet
3	60	Ryan Preece (CC)	RFK Racing	Ford
4	11	Denny Hamlin (CC)	Joe Gibbs Racing	Toyota
5	71	Michael McDowell	Spire Motorsports	Chevrolet
6	2	Austin Cindric (CC)	Team Penske	Ford
7	19	Chase Briscoe (CC)	Joe Gibbs Racing	Toyota
8	47	Ricky Stenhouse Jr.	Hyak Motorsports	Chevrolet
9	3	Austin Dillon	Richard Childress Racing	Chevrolet
10	48	Alex Bowman	Hendrick Motorsports	Chevrolet
11	20	Christopher Bell (CC)	Joe Gibbs Racing	Toyota
12	6	Brad Keselowski	RFK Racing	Ford
13	22	Joey Logano (CC)	Team Penske	Ford
14	21	Josh Berry	Wood Brothers Racing	Ford
15	35	Riley Herbst	23XI Racing	Toyota
16	41	Cole Custer	Haas Factory Team	Ford
17	23	Bubba Wallace (CC)	23XI Racing	Toyota
18	9	Chase Elliott (CC)	Hendrick Motorsports	Chevrolet
19	42	John Hunter Nemechek	Legacy Motor Club	Toyota
20	24	William Byron (CC)	Hendrick Motorsports	Chevrolet
21	34	Todd Gilliland	Front Row Motorsports	Ford
22	67	Corey Heim (i)	23XI Racing	Toyota
23	1	Ross Chastain	Trackhouse Racing	Chevrolet
24	12	Ryan Blaney (CC)	Team Penske	Ford
25	5	Kyle Larson (CC)	Hendrick Motorsports	Chevrolet
26	97	Shane van Gisbergen	Trackhouse Racing	Chevrolet
27	10	Ty Dillon	Kaulig Racing	Chevrolet
28	54	Ty Gibbs (CC)	Joe Gibbs Racing	Toyota
29	4	Noah Gragson	Front Row Motorsports	Ford
30	16	A. J. Allmendinger	Kaulig Racing	Chevrolet
31	88	Connor Zilisch (R)	Trackhouse Racing	Chevrolet
32	33	Austin Hill (i)	Richard Childress Racing	Chevrolet
33	38	Zane Smith	Front Row Motorsports	Ford
34	77	Carson Hocevar (CC)	Spire Motorsports	Chevrolet
35	17	Chris Buescher (CC)	RFK Racing	Ford
36	43	Erik Jones	Legacy Motor Club	Toyota
37	51	Cody Ware	Rick Ware Racing	Chevrolet
38	66	Chad Finchum (i)	Garage 66	Ford
Official starting lineup

== Race ==
=== Race results ===
==== Stage results ====
Stage One Laps: 107

Pos	No	Driver	Team	Manufacturer	Points
1	45	Tyler Reddick (CC)	23XI Racing	Toyota	10
2	23	Bubba Wallace (CC)	23XI Racing	Toyota	9
3	11	Denny Hamlin (CC)	Joe Gibbs Racing	Toyota	8
4	20	Christopher Bell (CC)	Joe Gibbs Racing	Toyota	7
5	12	Ryan Blaney (CC)	Team Penske	Ford	6
6	19	Chase Briscoe (CC)	Joe Gibbs Racing	Toyota	5
7	60	Ryan Preece (CC)	RFK Racing	Ford	4
8	2	Austin Cindric (CC)	Team Penske	Ford	3
9	24	William Byron (CC)	Hendrick Motorsports	Chevrolet	2
10	54	Ty Gibbs (CC)	Joe Gibbs Racing	Toyota	1

Stage Two Laps: 123

Pos	No	Driver	Team	Manufacturer	Points
1	20	Christopher Bell (CC)	Joe Gibbs Racing	Toyota	10
2	5	Kyle Larson (CC)	Hendrick Motorsports	Chevrolet	9
3	11	Denny Hamlin (CC)	Joe Gibbs Racing	Toyota	8
4	19	Chase Briscoe (CC)	Joe Gibbs Racing	Toyota	7
5	23	Bubba Wallace (CC)	23XI Racing	Toyota	6
6	12	Ryan Blaney (CC)	Team Penske	Ford	5
7	21	Josh Berry	Wood Brothers Racing	Ford	4
8	24	William Byron (CC)	Hendrick Motorsports	Chevrolet	3
9	45	Tyler Reddick (CC)	23XI Racing	Toyota	2
10	2	Austin Cindric (CC)	Team Penske	Ford	1

=== Final Stage results ===
Stage Three Laps: 137

Pos	Grid	No	Driver	Team	Manufacturer	Laps	Points
1	11	20	Christopher Bell (CC)	Joe Gibbs Racing	Toyota	367	73
2	28	54	Ty Gibbs (CC)	Joe Gibbs Racing	Toyota	367	36
3	1	45	Tyler Reddick (CC)	23XI Racing	Toyota	367	46
4	24	12	Ryan Blaney (CC)	Team Penske	Ford	367	44
5	25	5	Kyle Larson (CC)	Hendrick Motorsports	Chevrolet	367	41
6	7	19	Chase Briscoe (CC)	Joe Gibbs Racing	Toyota	367	43
7	14	21	Josh Berry	Wood Brothers Racing	Ford	367	34
8	17	23	Bubba Wallace (CC)	23XI Racing	Toyota	367	44
9	13	22	Joey Logano (CC)	Team Penske	Ford	367	28
10	3	60	Ryan Preece (CC)	RFK Racing	Ford	367	31
11	34	77	Carson Hocevar (CC)	Spire Motorsports	Chevrolet	367	26
12	10	48	Alex Bowman	Hendrick Motorsports	Chevrolet	367	25
13	6	2	Austin Cindric (CC)	Team Penske	Ford	367	28
14	18	9	Chase Elliott (CC)	Hendrick Motorsports	Chevrolet	367	23
15	36	43	Erik Jones	Legacy Motor Club	Toyota	367	22
16	21	34	Todd Gilliland	Front Row Motorsports	Ford	367	21
17	5	71	Michael McDowell	Spire Motorsports	Chevrolet	367	20
18	4	11	Denny Hamlin (CC)	Joe Gibbs Racing	Toyota	367	35
19	22	67	Corey Heim (i)	23XI Racing	Toyota	367	0
20	35	17	Chris Buescher (CC)	RFK Racing	Ford	367	17
21	2	7	Daniel Suárez (CC)	Spire Motorsports	Chevrolet	367	16
22	30	16	A. J. Allmendinger	Kaulig Racing	Chevrolet	367	15
23	12	6	Brad Keselowski	RFK Racing	Ford	367	14
24	19	42	John Hunter Nemechek	Legacy Motor Club	Toyota	367	13
25	33	38	Zane Smith	Front Row Motorsports	Ford	367	12
26	26	97	Shane van Gisbergen	Trackhouse Racing	Chevrolet	366	11
27	23	1	Ross Chastain	Trackhouse Racing	Chevrolet	366	10
28	32	33	Austin Hill (i)	Richard Childress Racing	Chevrolet	366	0
29	9	3	Austin Dillon	Richard Childress Racing	Chevrolet	366	8
30	15	35	Riley Herbst	23XI Racing	Toyota	366	7
31	27	10	Ty Dillon	Kaulig Racing	Chevrolet	366	6
32	29	4	Noah Gragson	Front Row Motorsports	Ford	366	5
33	16	41	Cole Custer	Haas Factory Team	Chevrolet	366	4
34	31	88	Connor Zilisch (R)	Trackhouse Racing	Chevrolet	365	3
35	8	47	Ricky Stenhouse Jr.	Hyak Motorsports	Chevrolet	363	2
36	37	51	Cody Ware	Rick Ware Racing	Chevrolet	363	1
37	20	24	William Byron (CC)	Hendrick Motorsports	Chevrolet	319	6
38	38	66	Chad Finchum (i)	Garage 66	Ford	243	0
Official race results

=== Race statistics ===
- Lead changes: 29 among 12 different drivers
- Cautions/Laps: 6 for 44
- Red flags: 1 for 7 minutes and 39 seconds
- Time of race: 4 hours, 3 minutes, and 5 seconds
- Average speed: 123.741 miles per hour (199.142 km/h)

== Media ==
=== Television ===
USA Sports covered the race on the television side. Leigh Diffey, 1999 Southern 500 winner Jeff Burton and Steve Letarte called the race from the broadcast booth. Dave Burns, Kim Coon, and Marty Snider handled pit road, while Trevor Bayne provided analysis from the pace car for the television side.

USA
Booth announcers	Pit reporters	Pace car
Lap-by-lap: Leigh Diffey; Color-commentator: Jeff Burton; Color-commentator: Steve Letarte	Dave Burns; Kim Coon; Marty Snider	Trevor Bayne

=== Radio ===
MRN had the radio call for the race, which was also simulcast on Sirius XM NASCAR Radio. Alex Hayden, Mike Bagley, and former championship crew chief Todd Gordon called the action for MRN when the field races thru the front straightaway. Dave Moody called the action for MRN from atop the Sunoco tower outside the exit of turn 2 when the field races thru turns 1 & 2. Tim Catalfamo worked the action for MRN when the field races thru turns 3 & 4. Pit road was operated by lead pit reporter Steve Post, Alex Weaver, and Chris Wilner.

MRN
Booth announcers	Turn announcers	Pit reporters
Lead announcer: Alex Hayden; Announcer: Mike Bagley; Announcer: Todd Gordon	Turns 1 & 2: Dave Moody; Turns 3 & 4: Tim Catalfamo	Steve Post; Alex Weaver; Chris Wilner

== Standings after the race ==
Drivers' Championship standings

	Pos	Driver	Points
	1	Denny Hamlin	2,135
4	2	Christopher Bell	2,123 (–12)
1	3	Ryan Blaney	2,119 (–16)
1	4	Tyler Reddick	2,111 (–24)
	5	Chase Briscoe	2,098 (–37)
2	6	Ty Gibbs	2,096 (–39)
1	7	Kyle Larson	2,086 (–49)
	8	Joey Logano	2,063 (–72)
1	9	Chase Elliott	2,063 (–72)
4	10	Bubba Wallace	2,054 (–81)
1	11	Chris Buescher	2,047 (–88)
	12	Carson Hocevar	2,046 (–89)
2	13	Daniel Suárez	2,041 (–94)
1	14	Austin Cindric	2,033 (–102)
1	15	Ryan Preece	2,031 (–104)
3	16	William Byron	2,021 (–114)
Official driver's standings

Manufacturers' Championship standings

Pos	Manufacturer	Points
1	Toyota	1,229
2	Chevrolet	1,027 (–202)
3	Ford	998 (–231)

- Note: Only the first 16 positions are included for the driver standings.

Previous race: 2026 Coke Zero Sugar 400	NASCAR Cup Series; 2026 season	Next race: 2026 Enjoy Illinois 300
