= Christopher Bell (racing driver) =

American racing driver (born 1994)

- Bell at Las Vegas Motor Speedway in 2026
- Born: Christopher David Bell; December 16, 1994 (age 31); Norman, Oklahoma, U.S.
- Achievements: 2026 Southern 500 Winner; 2024 Coca-Cola 600 Winner; 2017 NASCAR Camping World Truck Series Champion; 11th driver in history to win a NASCAR race in all 3 national series at the same track (New Hampshire, Atlanta, Bristol); 2017 NASCAR Camping World Truck Series Regular Season Champion; 2025 NASCAR All-Star Race Winner; 2017, 2018, 2019 Chili Bowl Nationals Champion; 2015 Eldora Mudsummer Classic Winner; 2014, 2017, 2018 Turkey Night Grand Prix winner 2013 USAC National Midget Series Champion

NASCAR Cup Series career
- 251 races run over 7 years
- Car no., team: No. 20 (Joe Gibbs Racing)
- 2026 position: 2nd
- Best finish: 2nd (2026)
- First race: 2020 Daytona 500 (Daytona)
- Last race: 2026 Season Finale 400 (Homestead)
- First win: 2021 O'Reilly Auto Parts 253 (Daytona RC)
- Last win: 2026 Cook Out Southern 500 (Darlington)
Wins	Top tens	Poles
14	126	15

NASCAR O'Reilly Auto Parts Series career
- 82 races run over 8 years
- 2026 position: 75th
- Best finish: 3rd (2019)
- First race: 2017 Hisense 4K TV 300 (Charlotte)
- Last race: 2026 Sport Clips Haircuts VFW 200 (Darlington)
- First win: 2017 Kansas Lottery 300 (Kansas)
- Last win: 2024 Sport Clips Haircuts VFW 200 (Darlington)
Wins	Top tens	Poles
19	52	14

NASCAR FedEx Freight Truck Series career
- 64 races run over 8 years
- 2026 position: 95th
- Best finish: 1st (2017)
- First race: 2015 American Ethanol 200 (Iowa)
- Last race: 2026 Team EJP 175 (New Hampshire)
- First win: 2015 Mudsummer Classic (Eldora)
- Last win: 2026 Tennessee Army National Guard 250 (Bristol)
Wins	Top tens	Poles
8	49	6

NASCAR Canada Series career
- 1 race run over 1 year
- 2017 position: 48th
- Best finish: 48th (2017)
- First race: 2017 Can-Am 200 (Mosport)
Wins	Top tens	Poles
0	0	0

ARCA Menards Series career
- 6 races run over 2 years
- Best finish: 25th (2016)
- First race: 2016 Kentuckiana Ford Dealers 200 (Salem)
- Last race: 2017 Scott 150 (Chicagoland)
- First win: 2016 Kentuckiana Ford Dealers 200 (Salem)
- Last win: 2017 Scott 150 (Chicagoland)
Wins	Top tens	Poles
3	6	0

ARCA Menards Series West career
- 3 races run over 2 years
- Best finish: 32nd (2015)
- First race: 2015 King Taco Catering/NAPA Auto Parts 150 (Irwindale)
- Last race: 2018 Star Nursery 100 (Las Vegas Dirt)
Wins	Top tens	Poles
0	2	0
- Statistics up to date as of November 8, 2026.

Christopher David Bell (born December 16, 1994) is an American professional stock car racing driver. He competes full-time in the NASCAR Cup Series, driving the No. 20 Toyota Camry XSE for Joe Gibbs Racing. He is the 2017 NASCAR Camping World Truck Series Champion.

== Racing career ==
=== Early career and dirt track racing ===
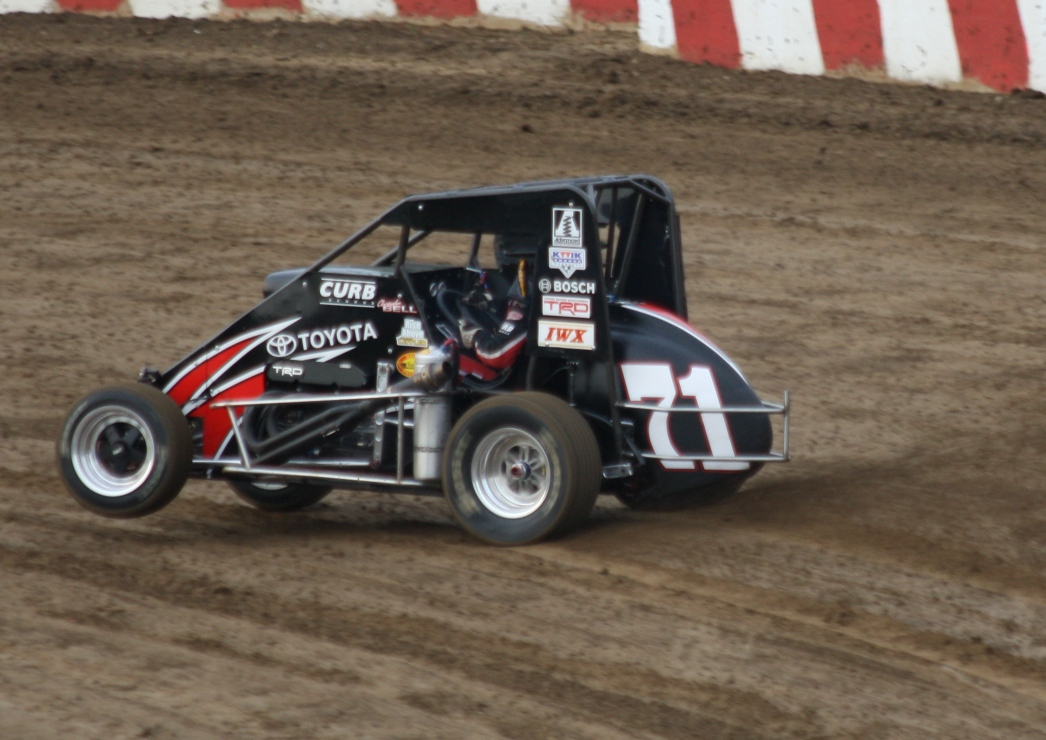
Bell's USAC midget at Angell Park Speedway in 2013

Bell began his racing career in micro sprints at I-44 Riverside Speedway in the early 2000s. He earned the Lucas Oil ASCS2 Championship in 2010 before winning the 66 Mike Phillips Memorial micro-sprint car race in 2011. The following year, he finished second in the Short Track Nationals at I-30 Speedway, a race sanctioned by the American Sprint Car Series. In 2013, he joined Keith Kunz Motorsports in USAC racing, replacing Kyle Larson. On October 31, 2013, he joined CH Motorsports' sprint car racing program. Bell concluded 2013 as the USAC National Midget Champion. In 2014, he began racing asphalt Super Late Models for Kyle Busch Motorsports, including competing in the World of Outlaws Sprint Car Series. On May 7, 2014, he won his first career WoO Sprint Car Series race at Jacksonville Speedway. As a Super Late Model driver, he won races at New Smyrna Speedway, South Alabama Speedway and Southern National Motorsports Park. During the year, he won 24 USAC Midget races and 26 total dirt races, including the Turkey Night Grand Prix.

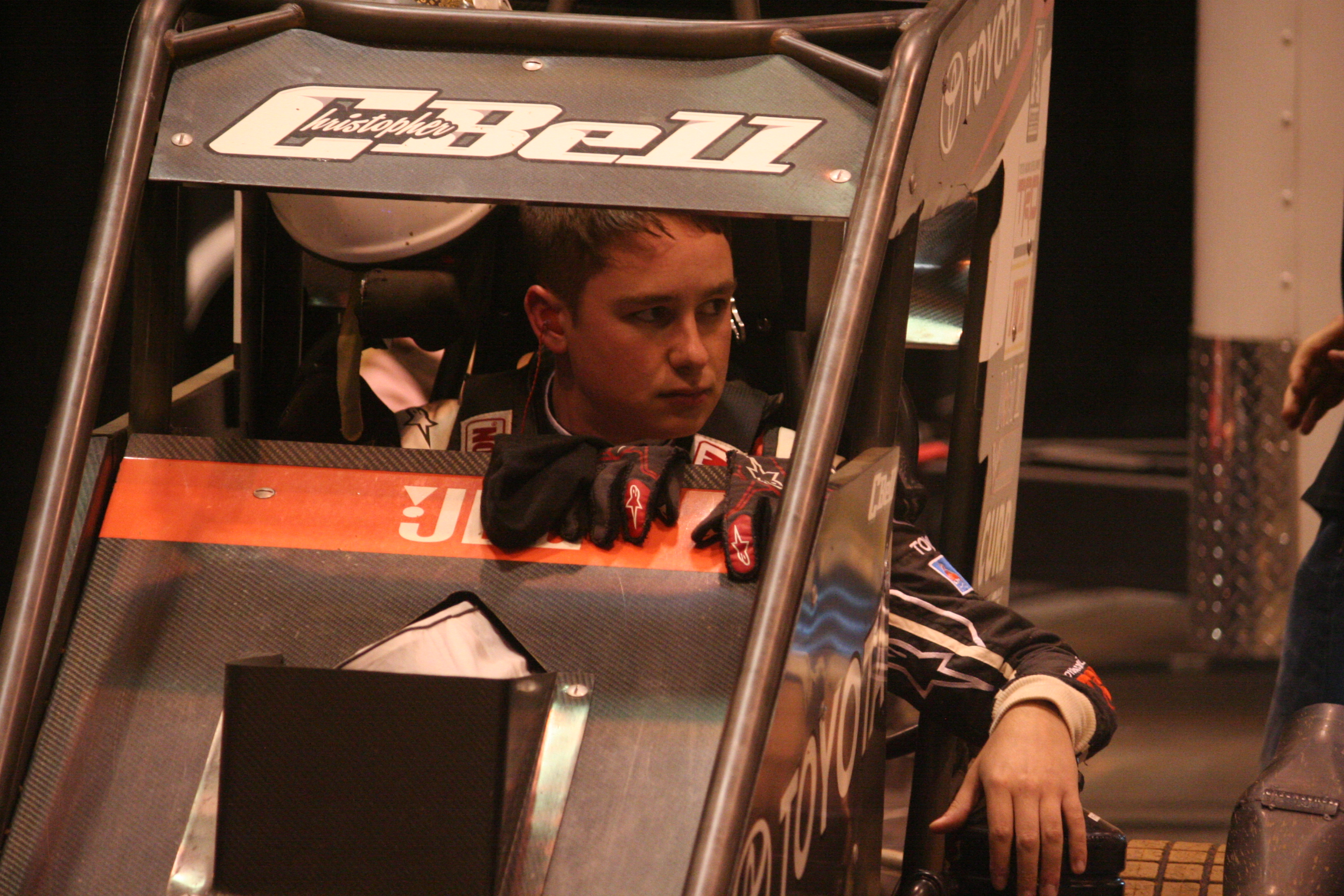
Bell inside his Gateway Dirt Nationals car in 2018

In 2017, Bell won the Chili Bowl Nationals, becoming the first Oklahoman to win the event since Andy Hillenburg in 1994. Bell followed the 2017 Chili Bowl win with his third consecutive Turnpike Challenge victory, the most recent win coming at his hometown track I-44 Riverside Speedway in Oklahoma City. He finished the 2017 season with a win in the Tulsa Shootout's Winged Outlaw Division.

Bell won the Chili Bowl again in 2018 and 2019 to become only the third three-time winner of the race.

During 2023 and most of 2024, Bell was reportedly restricted from dirt racing by Joe Gibbs Racing due to concerns about injury risk, with the team enforcing a ban that kept him sidelined from marquee events such as the Chili Bowl and other national midget and sprint car races.

Bell made his return to dirt competition in late 2024 after JGR officially lifted the ban that had kept him sidelined for nearly two years. He marked his comeback with a win at the Tulsa Shootout in the Non-Wing Outlaw division, his first since 2018, and followed that with a victory during the World of Outlaws' season-opening DIRTcar Nationals at Volusia Speedway Park.

=== NASCAR ===
==== 2015–2017: K&N Pro Series West and Truck Series ====
In 2015, Bell made two NASCAR K&N Pro Series West starts at Irwindale Speedway and Iowa Speedway, driving the No. 54 for Bill McAnally Racing; he finished 15th and second, respectively. In June, Bell returned to Iowa to make his Camping World Truck Series debut for KBM in the American Ethanol 200. Bell finished second to KBM teammate Erik Jones in the race's practice session, and finished fifth in the race. On July 8, 2015, Bell was announced as Justin Boston's replacement in the No. 54 at Kentucky Speedway. Bell won his first career Truck race in the Mudsummer Classic at Eldora Speedway after holding off Bobby Pierce on the green–white–checker finish.

On October 29, 2015, KBM announced that Bell would compete full-time in the Truck Series in 2016. His season started on a terrifying note at Daytona, when on the final lap, Brandon Brown pushed Timothy Peters into him causing his truck to spin. His truck gripped the track, causing it to go on two wheels before it launched into the air and barrel-rolled multiple times. The following week at Atlanta Motor Speedway, Bell was leading the race on his way to win, when he blew a tire and crashed into the wall, ending his day. He would have one lone win in 2016 at Gateway. He would finish third in the final standings.

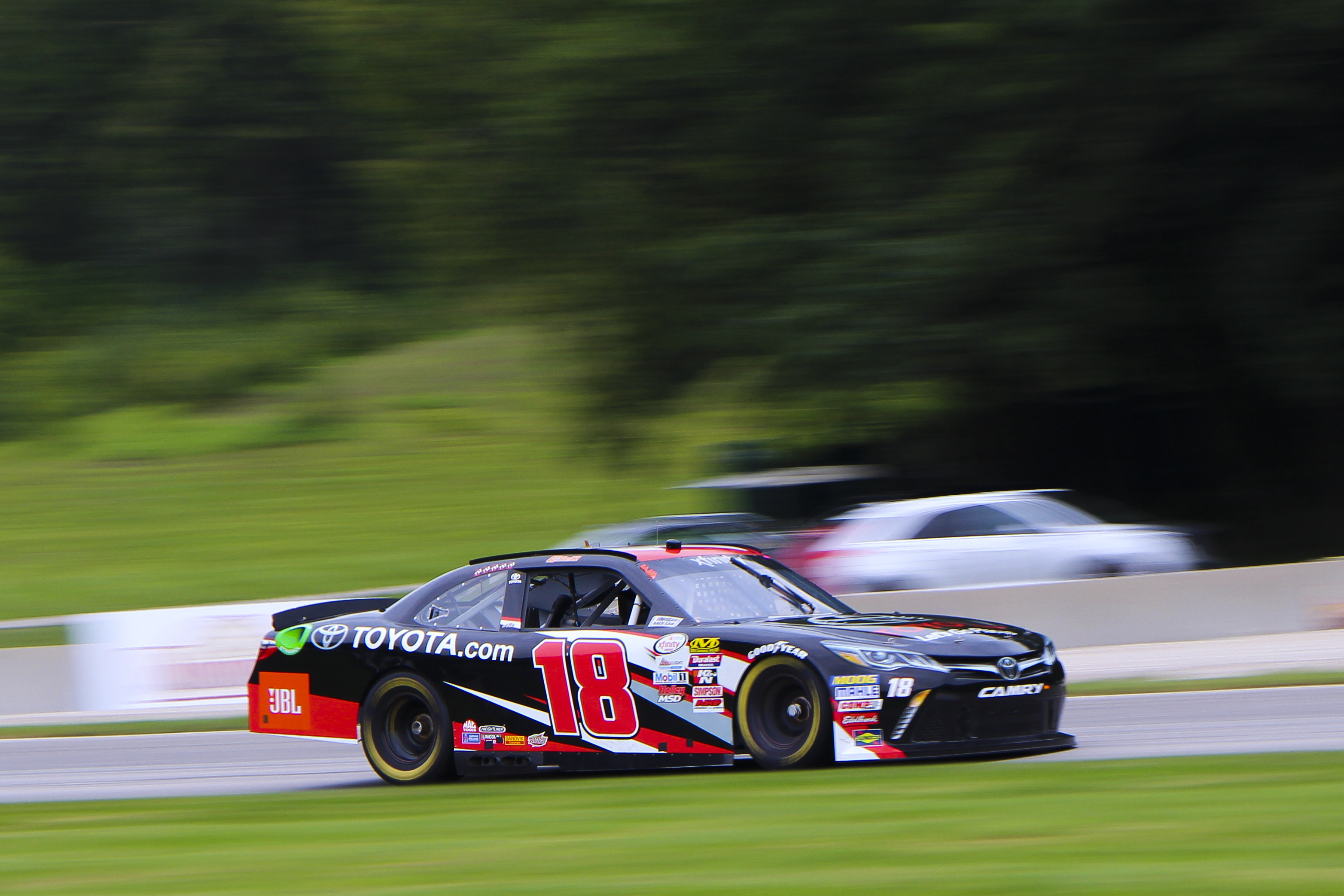
Bell's No. 18 Xfinity car at Road America in 2017

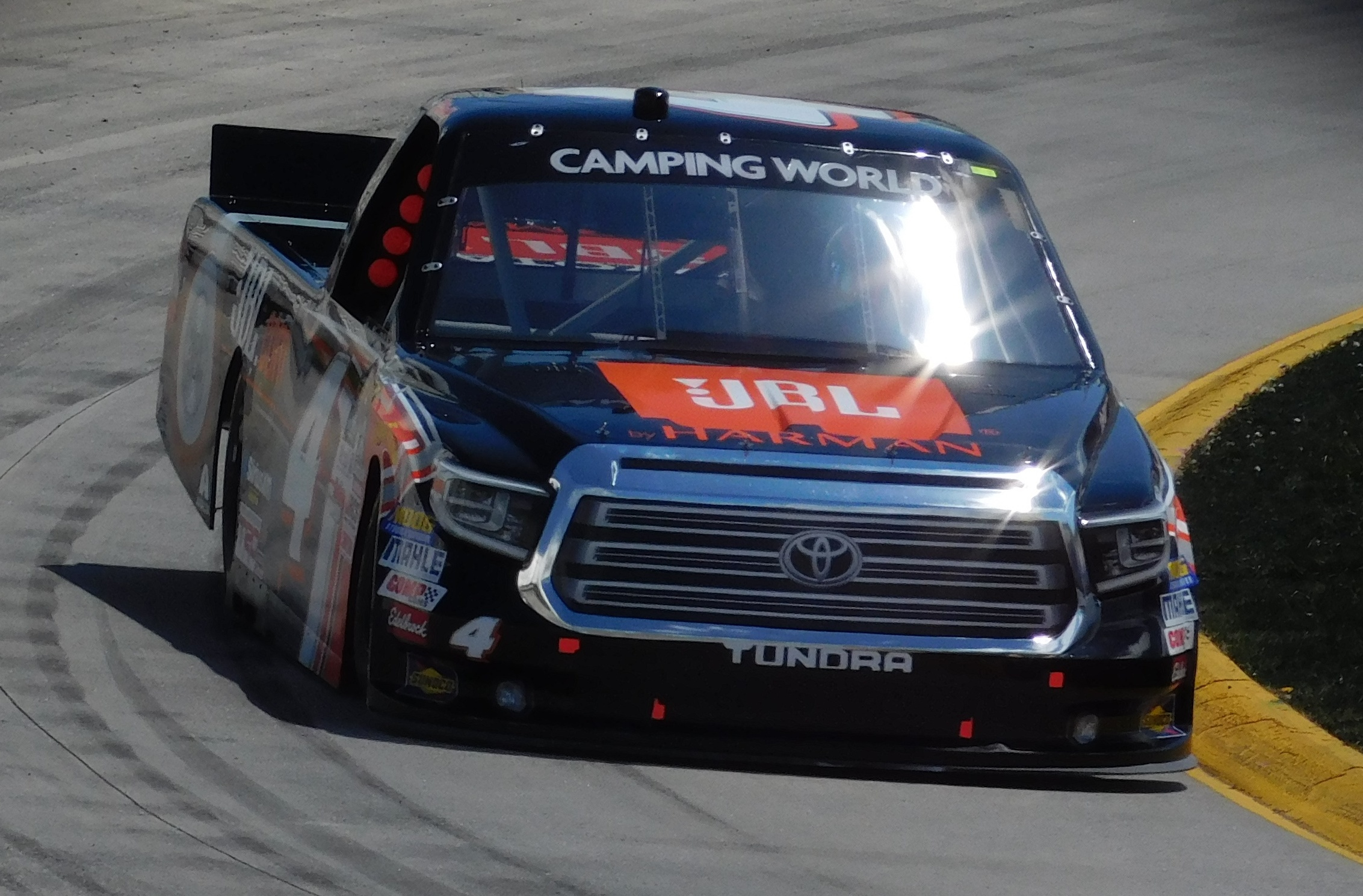
Bell's No. 4 truck at Martinsville in April 2017

In 2017, Bell won the second race of the season at Atlanta after winning the first two stages and passing Matt Crafton for the lead with sixteen laps remaining. In May, Bell made his Pinty's Series and Xfinity Series debuts; in the former, he drove the No. 22 for 22 Racing at the season-opening race at Canadian Tire Motorsport Park. In the latter, he joined the No. 18 of Joe Gibbs Racing at Charlotte Motor Speedway as part of a seven-race schedule. He also drove the No. 20 at Iowa and Richmond International Raceway before returning to the No. 18 to drive at Kansas Speedway, Texas Motor Speedway, Phoenix International Raceway and Homestead–Miami Speedway. At Mosport, he was the lone American in the field as he finished 23rd after suffering a brake failure.

In his Xfinity debut, Bell got an impressive fourth-place finish despite being spun out early in the race by Ryan Reed. During his second start at Iowa, Bell won the pole and looked on track for his first career win. Unfortunately, he was caught up in a multi-car crash late when he got turned while leading by the lap car of Ross Chastain following a crash between the lapped cars of Ryan Reed and Brennan Poole, which collected Bell and Chastain. The previous night, in the Truck race, he was also on track for a win but dropped back late and finished fifth. At Kentucky, Bell recovered from an early spin and outraced John Hunter Nemechek and Brandon Jones for his third truck win of the season and fifth of his career. Bell won his first Xfinity race at his fifth start in Kansas after catching and passing Erik Jones in the final laps. On November 17, 2017, Bell won the 2017 Truck Series championship by finishing second to his friend Chase Briscoe and being the best finisher among the Championship 4 of Bell, Crafton, Johnny Sauter, and Austin Cindric. Bell ended his Truck Series season with five wins, fifteen top-fives, and 21 top-tens to win the championship.

==== 2018–2019: Xfinity Series ====
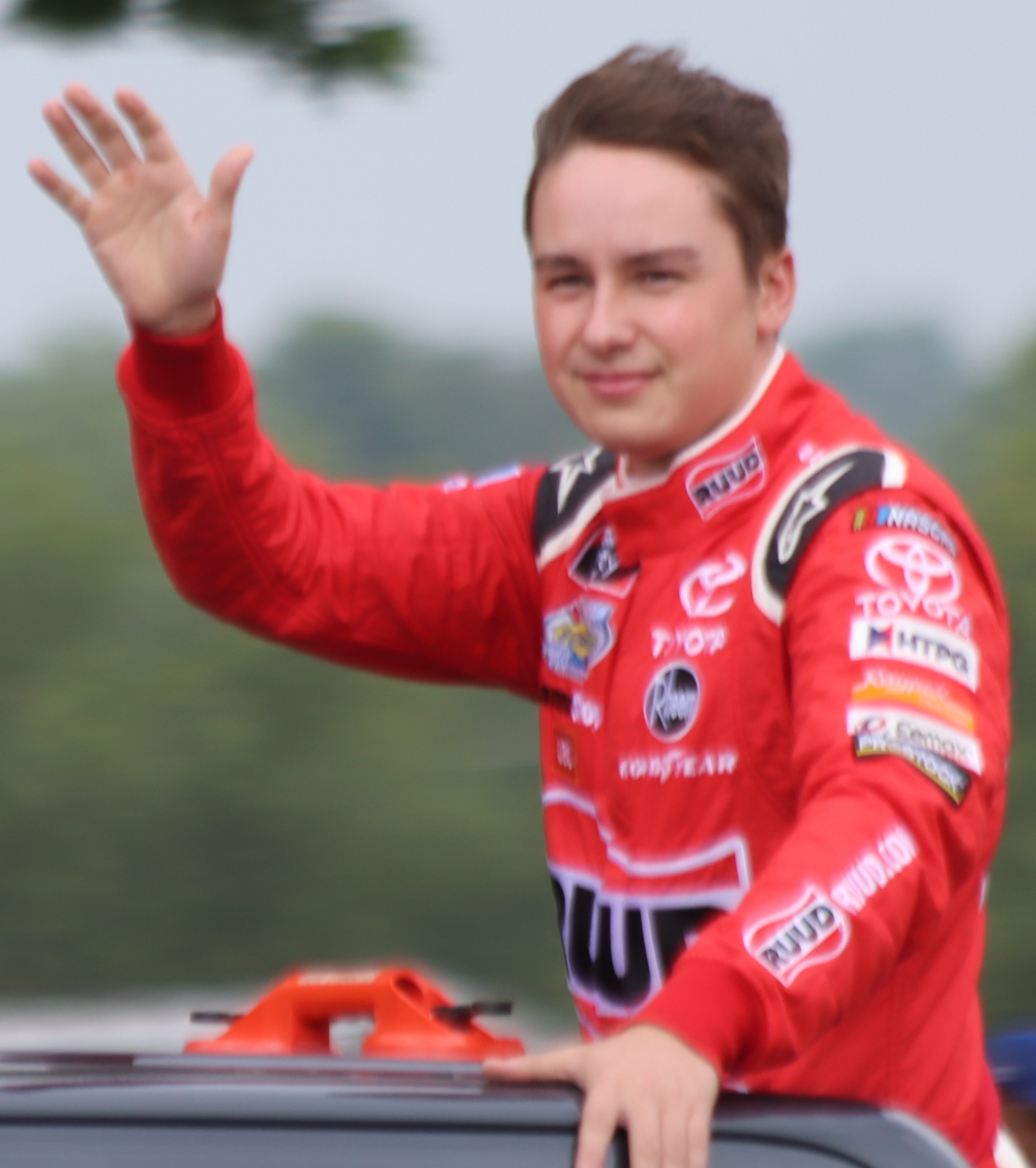
Bell during driver intros at Road America in 2018

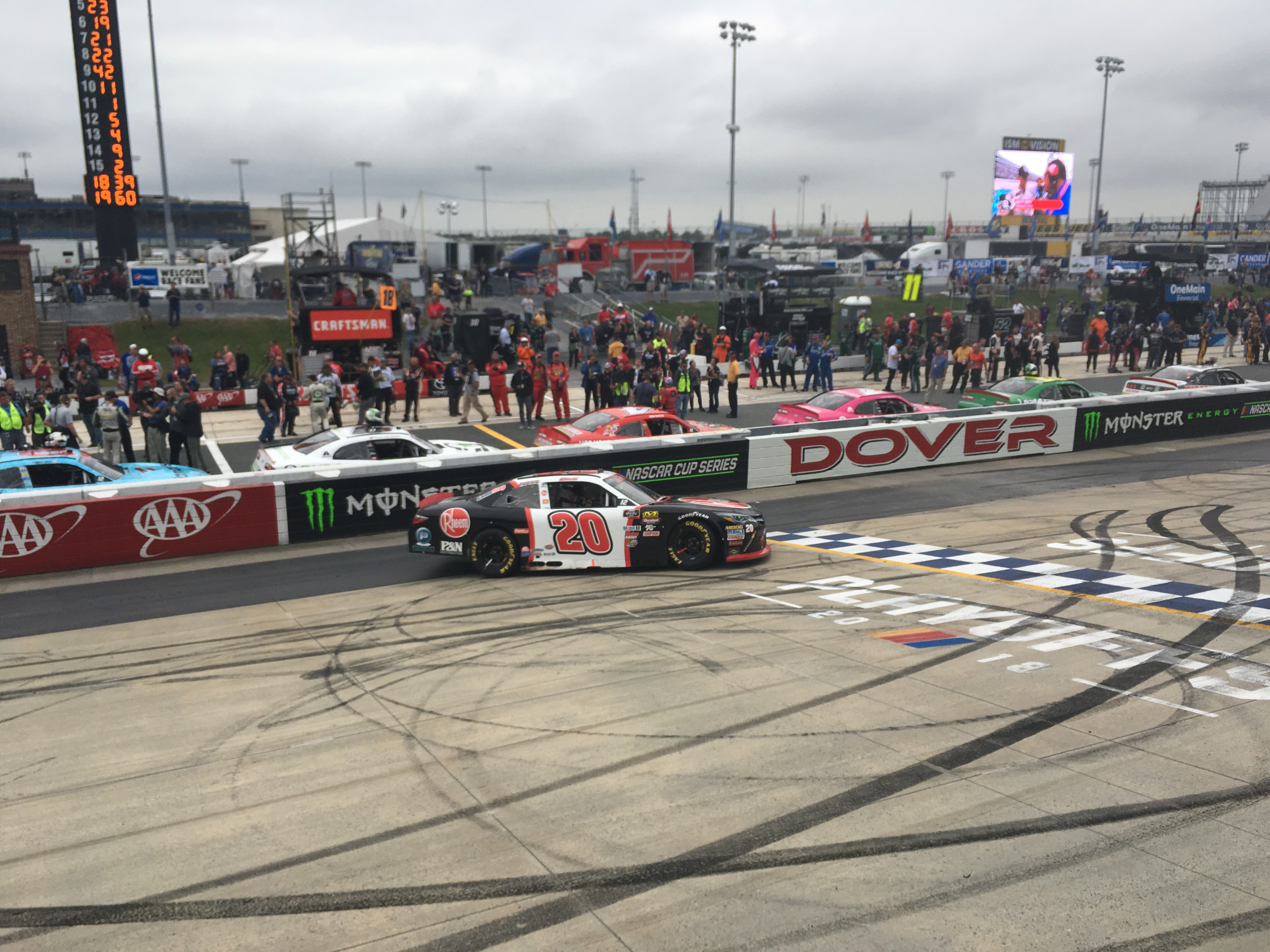
Bell doing burnouts after winning the Xfinity race at Dover in October 2018

In 2018, Bell moved to the Xfinity Series full-time to drive the No. 20 car for Joe Gibbs Racing. Bell won his first race of the season at Richmond in April, holding off teammate Noah Gragson. In July, Bell won three consecutive races at Kentucky, New Hampshire, and Iowa, becoming the first series regular since Dale Earnhardt Jr. in 1999 to win three consecutive races. Bell entered the Xfinity Series playoffs by winning at Richmond in September for the season sweep of the track. With this win, Bell would advance to the next round of the playoffs. Bell won his sixth race of the season at Dover in October, setting a rookie win record in the Xfinity Series. Bell won at the ISM Raceway on November 10, 2018, advancing to the Championship 4 after being in a must-win situation after poor finishes in the two prior races at Kansas and Texas. Bell finished eleventh at Homestead and fourth in points.

Bell returned for his second full-time season in Xfinity competition in 2019. He started with a sixth at Daytona, and the following week won at Atlanta in dominating fashion. The win at Atlanta was the first win for the Toyota Supra since the Camry was the model used when Toyota joined both the Xfinity and Cup Series in 2007. Bell won his second race of the season at Bristol in April, where he also won the $100,000 Dash 4 Cash bonus. Bell won once again at Dover, winning his second Dash 4 Cash bonus. Bell won his fourth race of the season at Iowa in June.

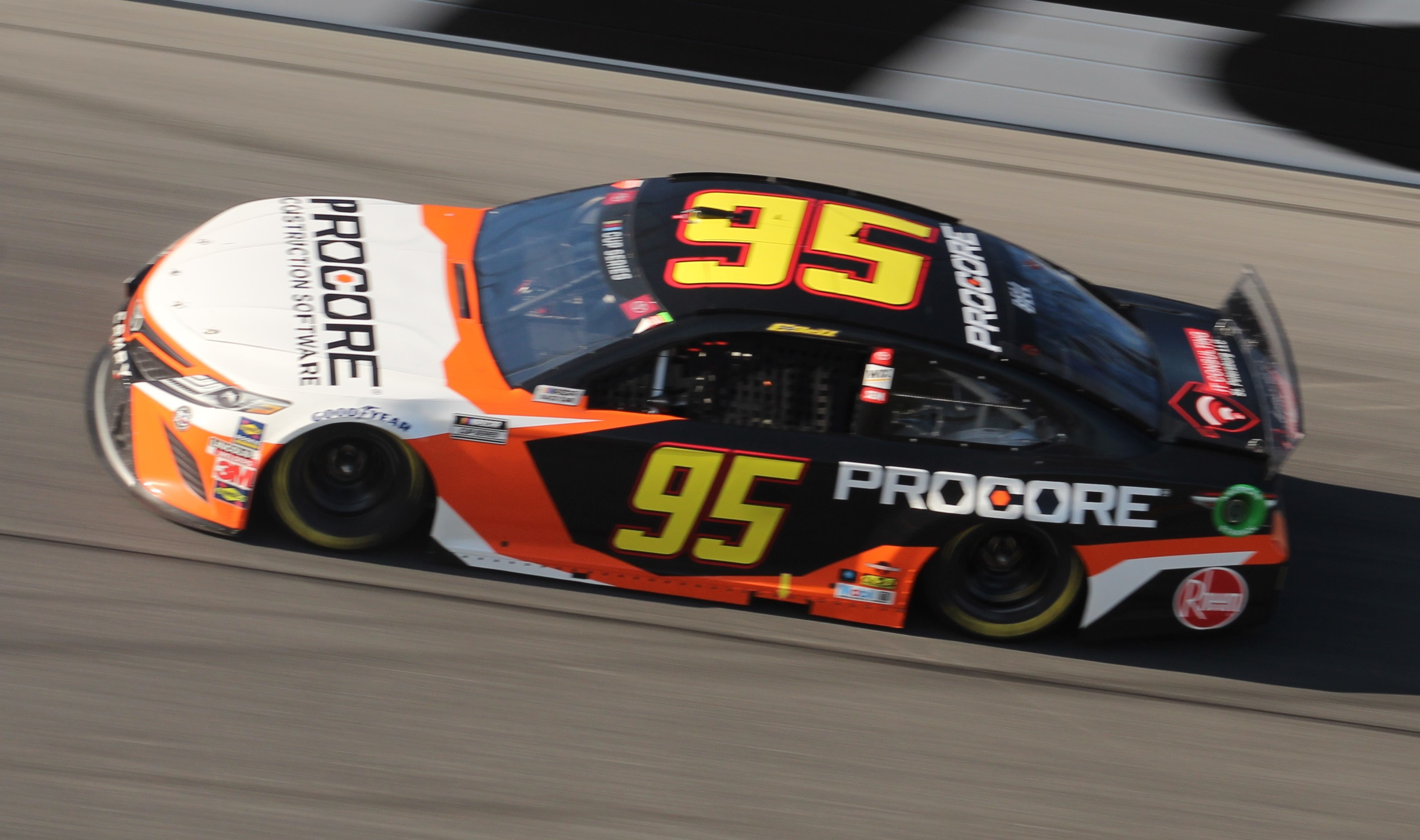
Bell's No. 95 Toyota at Daytona in 2020

On June 28, 2019, Bell signed a contract extension with JGR through 2020. In the following day's Camping World 300 at Chicagoland, Bell finished third but was disqualified after failing post-race inspection, relegating him to 38th. Bell won races at New Hampshire in July and Road America in August, the latter of which was his first road course win in the Xfinity Series. In September, Bell won the first race of the playoffs at Richmond, advancing to the next round. In November, Bell would win at Texas Motor Speedway and would punch his ticket into the championship round at Homestead–Miami Speedway for the second year in a row. He finished the 2019 season third in points after finishing fifth at Homestead.

==== 2020: Cup Series debut ====
On September 24, 2019, Leavine Family Racing announced that Bell would drive the No. 95 Toyota in the Cup Series starting in 2020. In addition, his Xfinity crew chief Jason Ratcliff joined him in the team. In LFR's final season, Bell scored two top-fives and seven top-tens. He finished twentieth in points and earned a drive in the No. 20 at Joe Gibbs Racing for 2021.

==== 2021: Joe Gibbs Racing ====
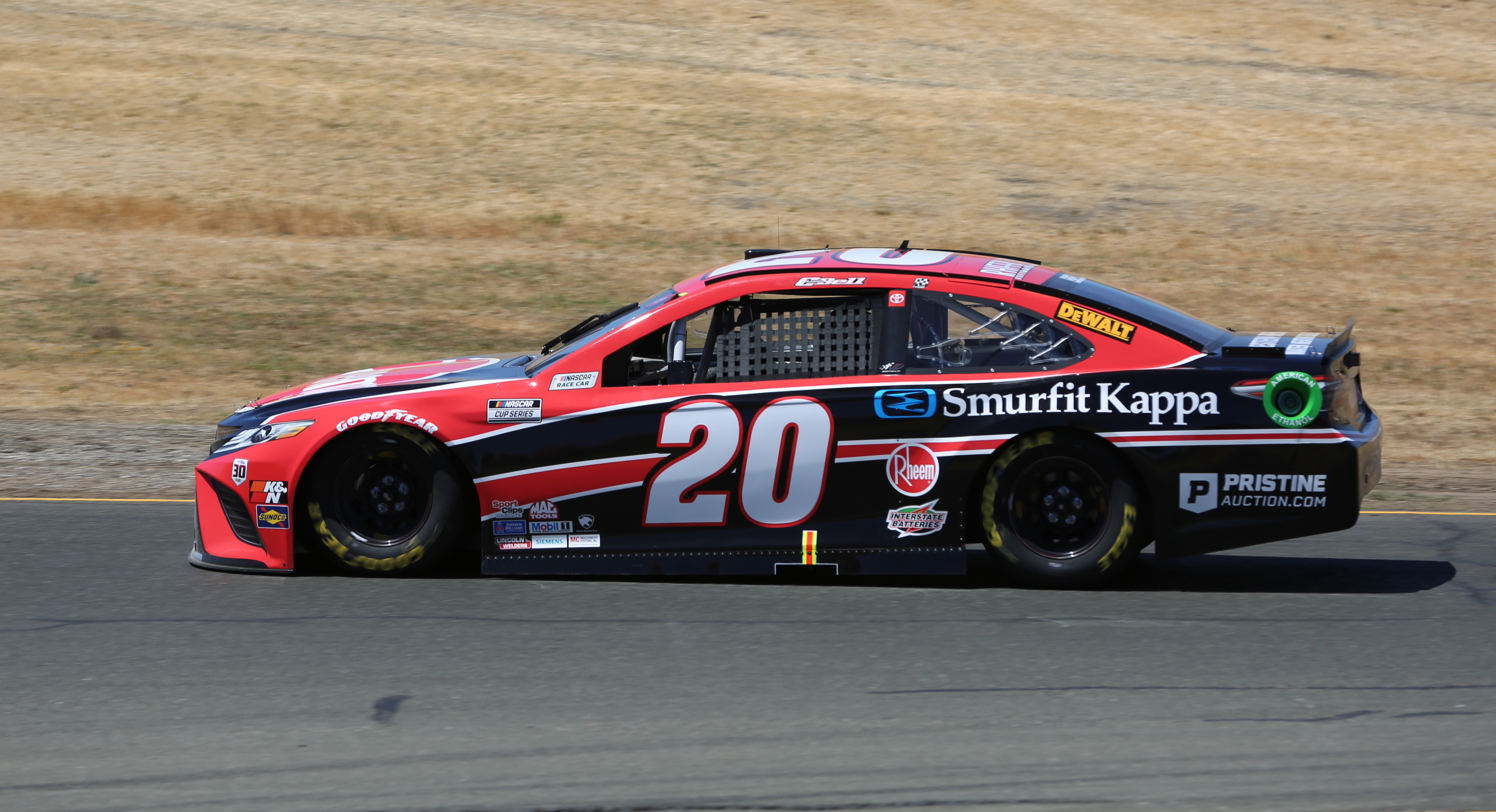
Bell's No. 20 Toyota at Sonoma Raceway in 2021

In his second race in JGR's No. 20, the 2021 O'Reilly Auto Parts 253 on Daytona's road course, he passed Joey Logano with two laps remaining to score his first career Cup victory. He became the first driver from Oklahoma to win a Cup Series race, the 35th driver to win a NASCAR race in all three main series, and the one-hundredth winner in NASCAR's modern era. In July, he returned to the Xfinity Series at New Hampshire, where he led 151 of 200 laps, including the final 146 to win. During the playoffs, Bell made it to the Round of 12, but struggled with a poor finish at Las Vegas, yet he rebounded with a fifth-place finish at Talladega. Following the Charlotte Roval race, he was eliminated from the Round of 12. He finished the season twelfth in the points standings.

==== 2022–2023: Championship Four ====
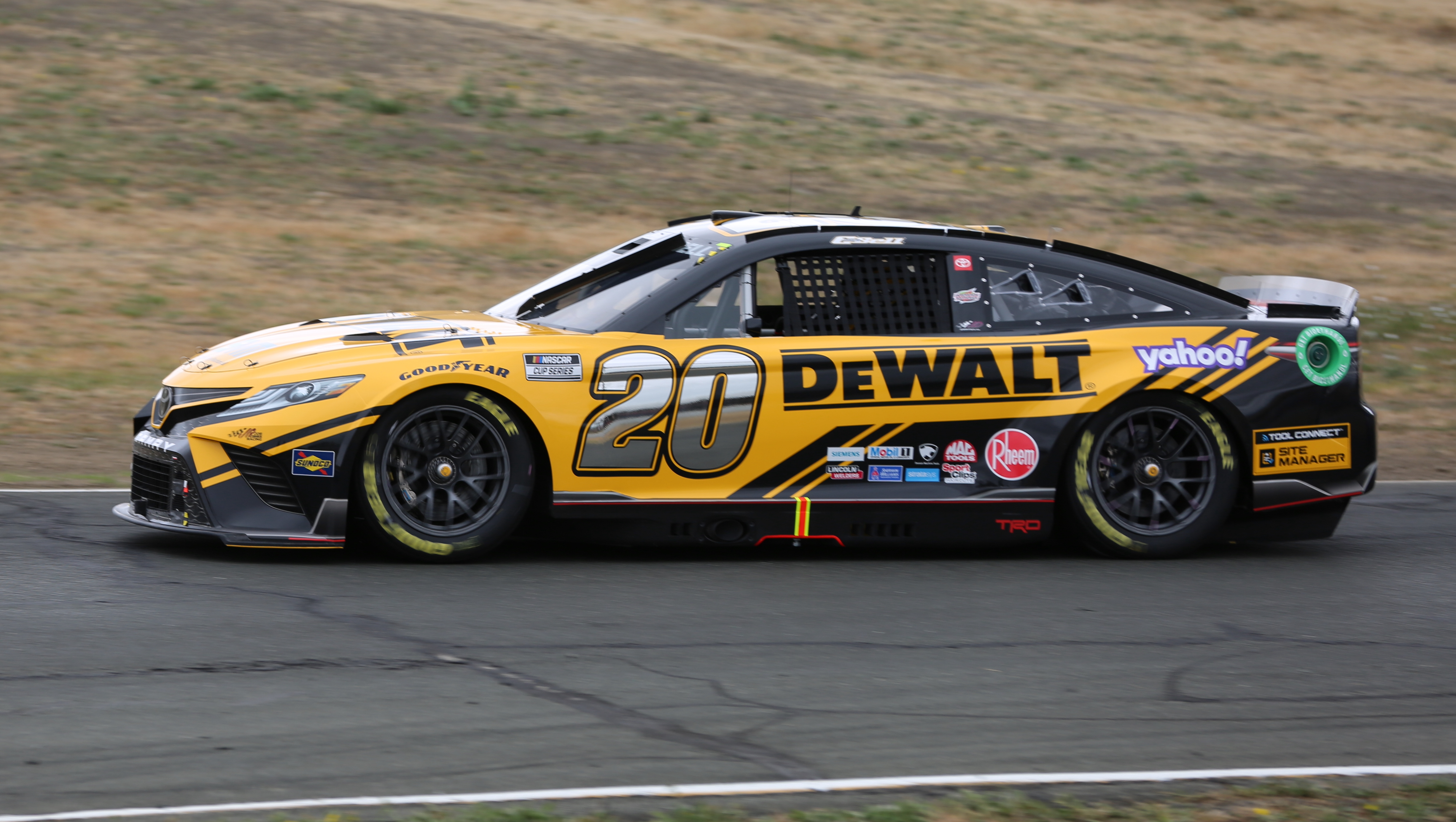
Bell's No. 20 car at Sonoma Raceway in 2022

Bell started the 2022 season with a 34th-place finish at the Daytona 500. At Atlanta, he accidentally struck Jackman, David O'Dell, during his pit stop. Bell crossed the finish line in second place, but he was penalized to a 23rd-place finish for passing below the line on the final lap. Bell scored a win at New Hampshire to become the 14th different winner of the season. During the playoffs, Bell won at the Charlotte Roval to advance to the Round of 8 after being in a must-win situation. At Las Vegas, Bell got caught between a wreck involving Kyle Larson and Bubba Wallace, resulting in a 34th-place finish and being well below the playoff cutline. Bell won at Martinsville to make the Championship 4 after being in another must-win situation. He finished tenth at the Phoenix finale and a career-best third in the points standings.

Bell began the 2023 season with a third-place finish at the 2023 Daytona 500. He scored his first win of the season at the Bristol dirt race. During the playoffs, Bell won at Homestead to make the Championship 4. At Phoenix, Bell suffered a 36th place DNF and was relegated to a fourth-place finish in the points standings after his right-front brake exploded, sending him to the third turn wall.

==== 2024: Late-season controversy ====
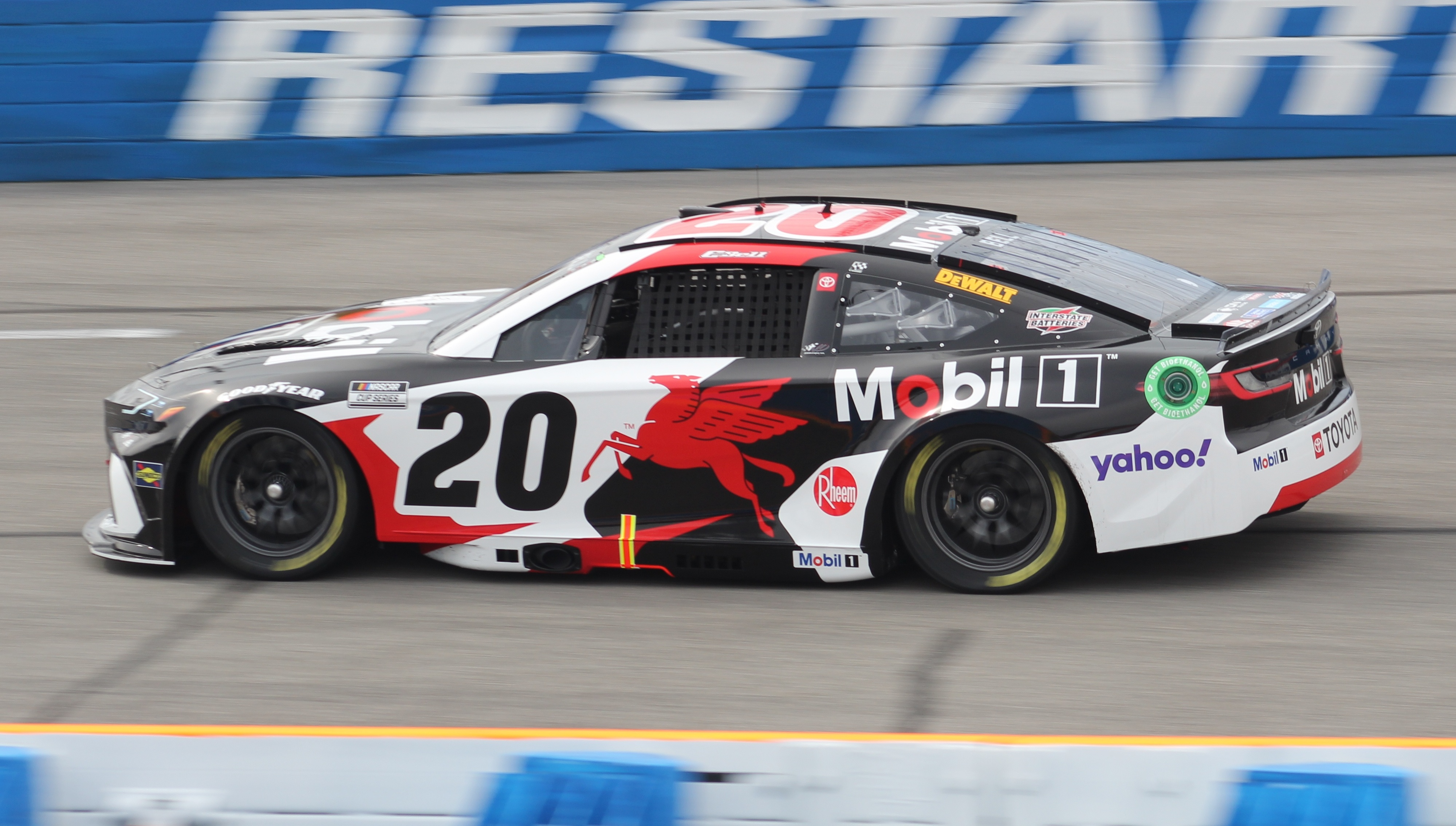
Bell's No. 20 car at Richmond Raceway in 2024

Bell started the 2024 season with another third-place finish at the 2024 Daytona 500. During the season, he won at Phoenix, Charlotte, and New Hampshire. At Martinsville during the playoffs, Bell ran against the outside wall in a move similar to Ross Chastain's "Hail Melon" to finish eighteenth, but NASCAR, which had banned the move in 2023, penalized him to 22nd place, the last car one lap down. Instead of being tied with William Byron in playoff points because of his placement, it resulted in him being eliminated from the playoffs.

During the Xfinity season, Bell drove the JGR No. 20 to wins at New Hampshire and Darlington.

==== 2025: Early dominance and All-Star win ====
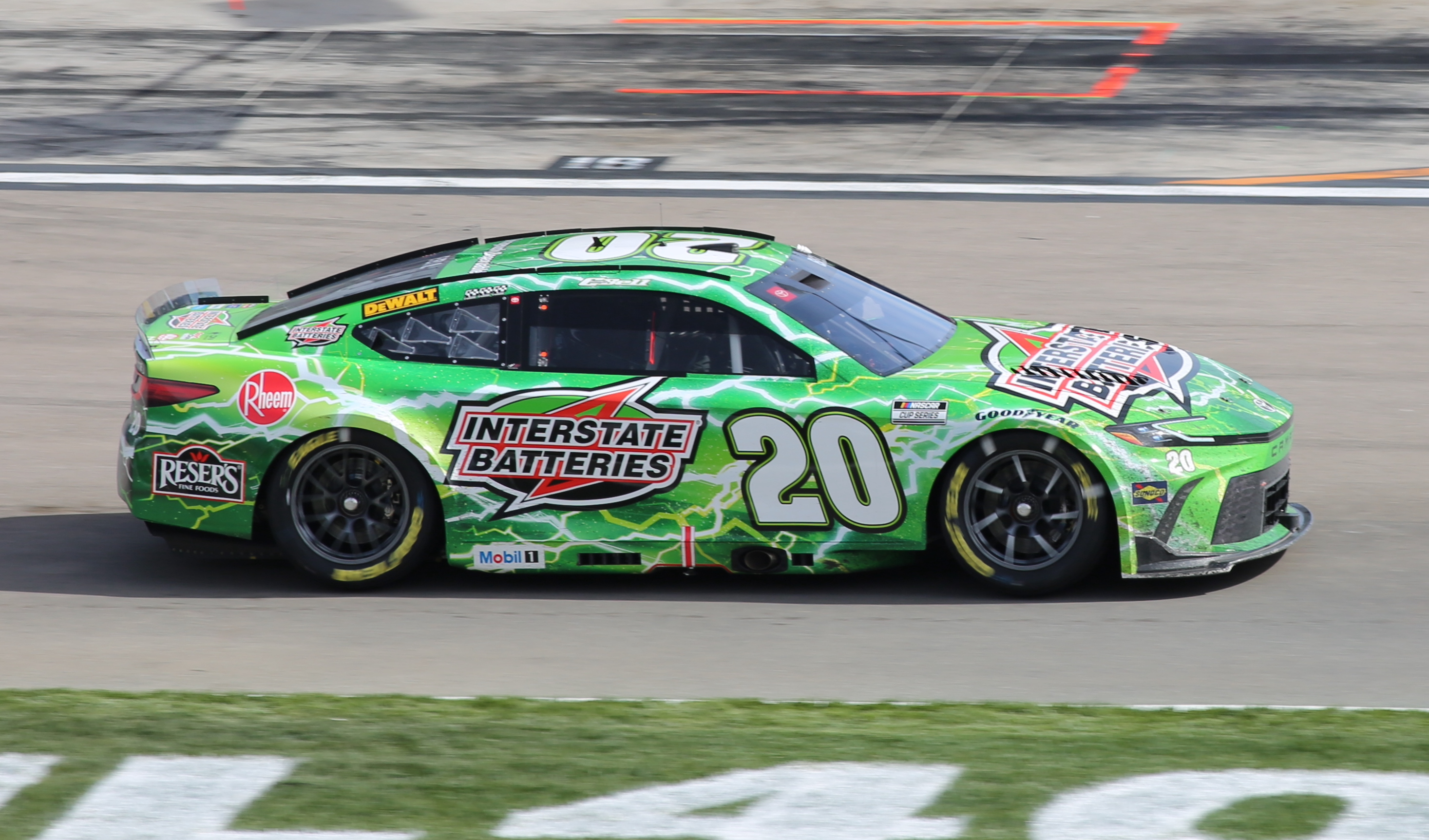
Bell's No. 20 car at Las Vegas Motor Speedway in 2025

Cup Series

Bell started the 2025 season with a 31st-place DNF at the 2025 Daytona 500, but rebounded with three consecutive victories. A week later, he won at Atlanta in a close, controversial finish. Bell was ahead of Carson Hocevar and Kyle Larson at the time of caution coming to the checkered flag during an overtime restart. The next week at Austin, Bell won back-to-back Cup Series races for the first time in his career, using a slight tire advantage to pass Kyle Busch and then hold off William Byron to win the race. A week later at Phoenix, Bell became the first driver to win 3 races in a row in the Next-Gen era, leading 105 laps en route to claiming the checkered flag during an overtime finish ahead of teammate Denny Hamlin. In May at North Wilkesboro, Bell started the All-Star Race from 2nd place after winning his heat race Saturday evening. Bell took on two right-side sticker tires during the promoter's caution late in the race, and used his tire advantage to pass Joey Logano for the win. Just days after his All-Star win, it was announced that Bell and longtime spotter Stevie Reeves would part ways in a surprising move. Bell stated it was entirely Reeves' decision to quit the role and admitted he was caught off guard by the change. Reeves was replaced by Matt Philpott from Charlotte through Pocono. From the Summer Atlanta race onward, Bell's spotter duties were taken over by Tab Boyd, who had previously worked with Ricky Stenhouse Jr.. Boyd became available after being released by Hyak Motorsports in the wake of comments he made during the Mexico City race weekend.

During the playoffs, Bell won Bristol, passing Carson Hocevar and Zane Smith on a late restart, before ultimately holding off a last-lap "bump and run" attempt from Brad Keselowski to secure the win. Bell entered the Martinsville cutoff race third in the playoff standings, 37 points above the cutoff line, but only one point ahead of Kyle Larson, who sat fourth in the standings. With William Byron winning the race from below the cutoff line and Larson earning eight more points than Bell on the day, he was eliminated during the Round of 8. Bell ended the season 5th in the standings for the second consecutive year, setting career highs in wins and average finish, while marking his fourth straight season finishing in the top-five of the championship standings.

Xfinity and Truck Series

During the Xfinity season, Bell qualified the JGR No. 19 on pole for the Darlington race. He ran inside the top-ten for most of the day but finished 25th after sustaining damage in a restart incident with Ross Chastain during Stage 3. In Mexico City, Bell drove the No. 24 for fellow Toyota team Sam Hunt Racing. He qualified third but suffered an engine failure while holding that position late in Stage 2, resulting in a 39th-place finish.

Bell had not been scheduled to compete in the 2025 NASCAR Craftsman Truck Series; however, following injuries sustained by fellow dirt racer Stewart Friesen, he was tapped by Halmar Friesen Racing to drive the No. 52 truck at Watkins Glen. Bell led 30 laps and finished fourth.

==== 2026: Runner up in standings ====
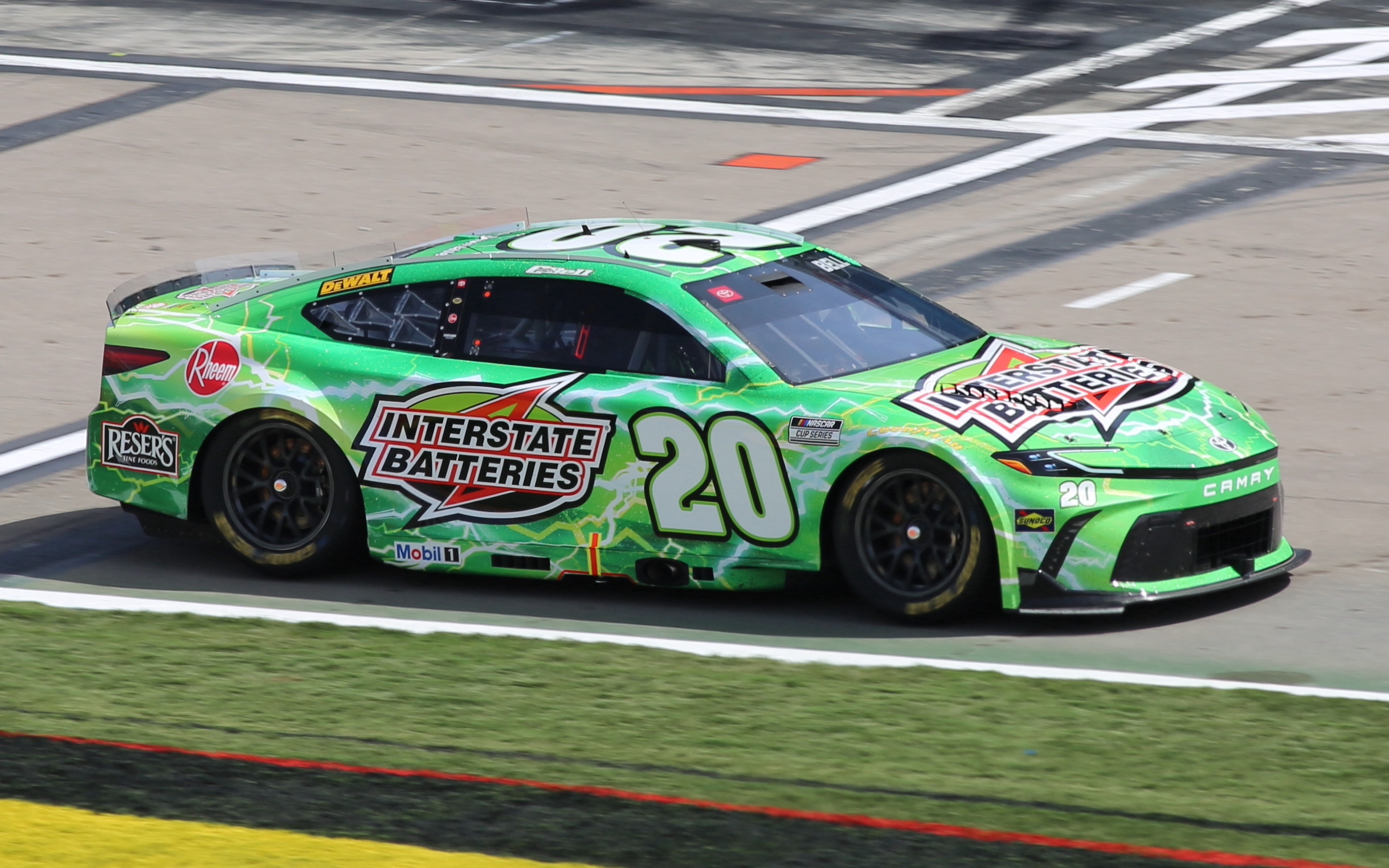
Bell's No. 20 car at Las Vegas Motor Speedway in 2026

Cup Series

Bell started the 2026 season with a 35th-place DNF at the 2026 Daytona 500. The rest of his regular season was defined by exceptional speed undermined by persistent misfortune. At Phoenix in March, Bell led a race-high 176 of 312 laps and held a lead of over three seconds before a late caution with 25 laps to go triggered a final pit cycle that dropped him outside the top five for the restart; he recovered to finish second to Ryan Blaney. A similar scenario unfolded at Nashville in May, where a late caution with 13 laps remaining set up a four-lap dash that allowed teammate Denny Hamlin to pass him for the win; Bell finished second by 0.115 seconds. Bell was also collected in accidents not of his making on four occasions while running inside the top five, at Atlanta I in February, Kansas in April, Texas in May, and Michigan in June.

The Michigan incident was the most consequential, with Bell sustaining the hardest ever impact seen in the Gen-7 era. While running second on Lap 148, Chase Elliott got loose underneath Bell entering Turn 3 and made contact, sending the No. 20 into the outside wall at nearly 200 mph at a near 45-degree angle. The impact deformed the SAFER barrier and forced a 20-minute red flag for repairs. Though Bell was evaluated and released from the infield care center, a couple of days later it was confirmed that Bell fractured his left wrist but was cleared to race at the next race in Pocono. Despite still being cleared to race the following week at the inaugural race at the Coronado Street Course, the tight, wall-lined nature of the street course led him and crew chief Adam Stevens to plan an early exit; Bell handed the No. 20 to O'Reilly Auto Parts Series driver Brent Crews at the first caution, with Crews driving the remainder in relief. While wearing an arm brace, he finished fifth at Sonoma and second four times. After earning seven runner-up finishes, Bell finally won the Southern 500. Bell added an eighth runner-up finish at Charlotte in October, falling 0.029 seconds short of Joe Gibbs Racing teammate Chase Briscoe in a photo finish, the second-closest finish in the track's Cup Series history. Fittingly, with only slim hopes of the championship entering the final race, Bell finished the year second in the standings, as Kyle Larson clinched his third title at Homestead–Miami after Stage 1. The final standings marked Bell's fifth consecutive top-five points finish, making him the only driver to finish in the top five of the standings in every season of Gen-7 competition.

O'Reilly and Truck Series

During the O'Reilly Auto Parts Series, Bell made a start at Darlington, where he finished third.

In the Truck Series, Bell continued his collaboration with Halmar Friesen Racing from the previous year, running five events in the team's second full-time No. 62 truck: Darlington, Bristol, Dover, Michigan and North Wilkesboro. Bell won the race at Bristol, his first win in the series since 2017. Bell was supposed to run the race at Richmond but would be replaced by Leland Honeyman Jr.

== CB Industries ==
On September 19, 2019, Bell in conjunction with fellow racer Chad Boat announced the formation of CB Industries, a World of Outlaws sprint car team fielding the No. 21 Mobil 1 Toyota for Christopher Bell. In the team's first-ever race on September 21, 2019, they won the Jim Ford Classic.

On August 13, 2019, the team won with Bell in their first-ever start in the World of Outlaws NOS Energy Drink Sprint Car Series at Tri-State Speedway.

== Personal life ==
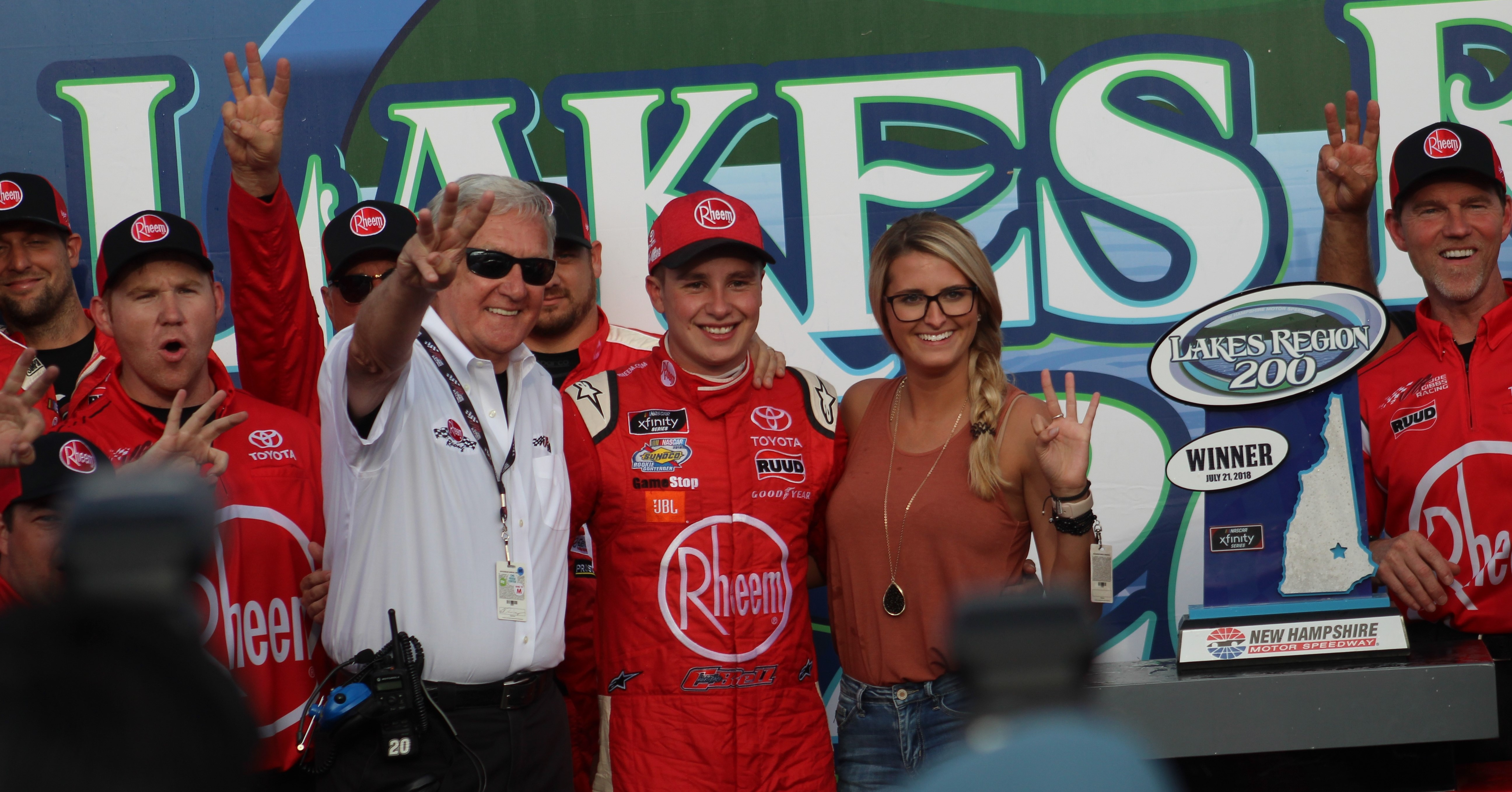
Bell and his wife Morgan in victory lane at New Hampshire after Bell's Xfinity win there in 2018

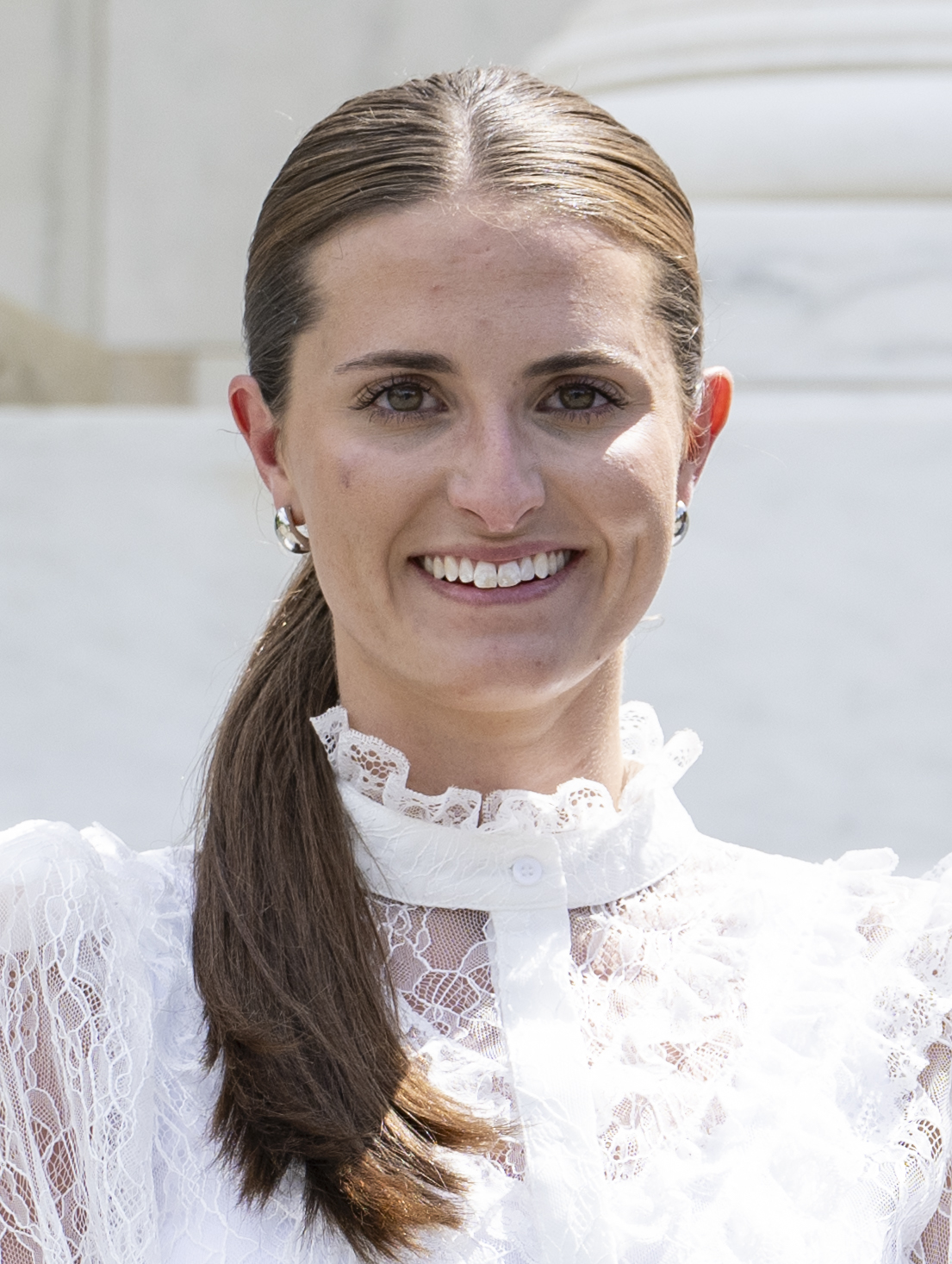
Morgan Bell in 2025

Bell got engaged to Morgan Kemenah in December 2018 after they had been dating for four and a half years, and they married on February 2, 2020 according to Bell's Instagram page, weeks before the Daytona 500.

=== In media ===
In 2026, Bell joined the NASCAR on The CW crew as a guest analyst at the 2026 Fleetio 200.

== Motorsports career results ==
=== Stock car career summary ===
Season	Series	Team	Races	Wins	Top 5	Top 10	Points	Position
2015	CARS Super Late Model Tour	Kyle Busch Motorsports	4	3	4	4	139	12th
2015	CARS Late Model Stock Car Tour	Kyle Busch Motorsports	1	0	0	0	7	59th
2015	NASCAR K&N Pro Series West	Bill McAnally Racing	2	0	1	1	71	32nd
2015	NASCAR Camping World Truck Series	Kyle Busch Motorsports	7	1	2	3	231	27th
2016	CARS Super Late Model Tour	Kyle Busch Motorsports	1	1	1	1	35	39th
2016	ARCA Racing Series	Venturini Motorsports	5	2	3	5	1085	25th
2016	NASCAR Camping World Truck Series	Kyle Busch Motorsports	23	1	9	17	4025	**3rd**
2017	CARS Super Late Model Tour	Kyle Busch Motorsports	1	0	0	0	21	42nd
2017	NASCAR Pinty's Series	22 Racing	1	0	0	0	21	48th
2017	ARCA Racing Series	Venturini Motorsports	1	1	1	1	240	72nd
2017	NASCAR Camping World Truck Series	Kyle Busch Motorsports	23	5	15	21	4035	**1st**
2017	NASCAR Xfinity Series	Joe Gibbs Racing	8	1	3	5	0	NC†
2018	NASCAR K&N Pro Series West	Bill McAnally Racing	1	0	0	1	35	40th
2018	NASCAR Camping World Truck Series	Kyle Busch Motorsports	1	0	0	0	0	NC†
2018	NASCAR Xfinity Series	Joe Gibbs Racing	33	7	18	20	4026	4th
2019	NASCAR Xfinity Series	Joe Gibbs Racing	33	8	20	21	4032	**3rd**
2020	NASCAR Cup Series	Leavine Family Racing	36	0	2	7	678	20th
2021	NASCAR Xfinity Series	Joe Gibbs Racing	2	1	1	2	0	NC†
2021	NASCAR Cup Series	Joe Gibbs Racing	36	1	7	16	2279	12th
2022	NASCAR Xfinity Series	Joe Gibbs Racing	1	0	0	1	0	NC†
2022	NASCAR Cup Series	Joe Gibbs Racing	36	3	11	20	5027	**3rd**
2023	NASCAR Craftsman Truck Series	Hattori Racing Enterprises	2	0	1	1	0	NC†
2023	NASCAR Cup Series	Joe Gibbs Racing	36	2	10	18	5001	4th
2024	NASCAR Craftsman Truck Series	Tricon Garage	1	0	1	1	0	NC†
2024	NASCAR Xfinity Series	Joe Gibbs Racing	2	2	2	2	0	NC†
2024	NASCAR Cup Series	Joe Gibbs Racing	36	3	15	23	2412	5th
2025	ASA STARS National Tour	Wilson Motorsports	1	0	0	1	51	48th
2025	NASCAR Craftsman Truck Series	Halmar Friesen Racing	1	0	1	1	0	NC†
2025	NASCAR Xfinity Series	Joe Gibbs Racing	1	0	0	0	0	NC†
2025	NASCAR Xfinity Series	Sam Hunt Racing	1	0	0	0	0	NC†
2025	NASCAR Cup Series	Joe Gibbs Racing	36	4	13	22	2403	5th
2026	ASA STARS National Tour	Wilson Motorsports	1	1	1	1		
2026	NASCAR Craftsman Truck Series	Halmar Friesen Racing	6	1	2	5	0	NC†
2026	NASCAR O'Reilly Auto Parts Series	Joe Gibbs Racing	1	0	1	1	0	NC†
2026	NASCAR Cup Series	Joe Gibbs Racing	36	1	15	19	2452	**2nd**

^{†} As Bell was a guest driver, he was ineligible for championship points.

=== NASCAR ===
(key) (Bold – Pole position awarded by qualifying time. Italics – Pole position earned by points standings or practice time. * – Most laps led.)

==== Cup Series ====
NASCAR Cup Series results
Year	Team	No.	Make	1	2	3	4	5	6	7	8	9	10	11	12	13	14	15	16	17	18	19	20	21	22	23	24	25	26	27	28	29	30	31	32	33	34	35	36	NCSC	Pts	Ref
2020	Leavine Family Racing	95	Toyota	DAY; 21	LVS; 33	CAL; 38	PHO; 24	DAR; 24	DAR; 11	CLT; 9	CLT; 21	BRI; 9	ATL; 18	MAR; 28	HOM; 8	TAL; 29	POC; 4	POC; 39	IND; 12	KEN; 7	TEX; 21	KAN; 23	NHA; 28	MCH; 13	MCH; 17	DRC; 21	DOV; 22	DOV; 27	DAY; 13	DAR; 34	RCH; 15	BRI; 28	LVS; 24	TAL; 39	ROV; 24	KAN; 10	TEX; 3	MAR; 15	PHO; 17	20th	678	
2021	Joe Gibbs Racing	20	Toyota	DAY; 16	DRC; 1	HOM; 20	LVS; 7	PHO; 9	ATL; 21	BRD; 34	MAR; 7	RCH; 4	TAL; 17	KAN; 28	DAR; 14	DOV; 21	COA; 38	CLT; 24	SON; 24	NSH; 9	POC; 17	POC; 32	ROA; 2	ATL; 8	NHA; 2	GLN; 7	IRC; 36	MCH; 13	DAY; 32	DAR; 20	RCH; 3	BRI; 29	LVS; 24	TAL; 5	ROV; 8	TEX; 3	KAN; 8	MAR; 17	PHO; 9	12th	2279	
2022	Joe Gibbs Racing	20	Toyota	DAY; 34	CAL; 36	**LVS**; 10	PHO; 26	ATL; 23	COA; 3	RCH; 6	MAR; 20	BRD; 7	**TAL**; 22	DOV; 4	DAR; 6	**KAN**; 5	CLT; 5	GTW; 9	SON; 27	NSH; 8	ROA; 18	ATL; 19	NHA; 1	POC; 4	IRC; 12	MCH; 26	RCH; 2	GLN; 8	DAY; 36	DAR; 5	KAN; 3	BRI; 4	TEX; 34	**TAL**; 17	ROV; 1	LVS; 34	HOM; 11	MAR; 1	PHO; 10	3rd	5027	
2023	Joe Gibbs Racing	20	Toyota	DAY; 3	CAL; 32	LVS; 5	PHO; 6	ATL; 3	COA; 31	RCH; 4	BRD; 1*	MAR; 16	TAL; 8	DOV; 6	KAN; 36	DAR; 14	CLT; 24	GTW; 11	SON; 9	NSH; 7	CSC; 18*	ATL; 23	**NHA**; 29	POC; 6	RCH; 20	**MCH**; 13	IRC; 9	GLN; 3	DAY; 16	**DAR**; 23	**KAN**; 8	**BRI**; 3*	TEX; 4	TAL; 14	ROV; 15	**LVS**; 2	HOM; 1	MAR; 7	PHO; 36	4th	5001	
2024	Joe Gibbs Racing	20	Toyota	DAY; 3	ATL; 34	LVS; 33	PHO; 1	BRI; 10	COA; 2	RCH; 6	MAR; 35	TEX; 17	TAL; 38	DOV; 34	**KAN**; 6	DAR; 13	CLT; 1*	GTW; 7*	SON; 9	IOW; 4	NHA; 1*	NSH; 36*	CSC; 37	POC; 12	IND; 4	RCH; 6	MCH; 35	DAY; 3	DAR; 3	ATL; 4	GLN; 14	BRI; 5	**KAN**; 7*	TAL; 6	ROV; 2	**LVS**; 2*	HOM; 4	MAR; 22	PHO; 5*	5th	2412	
2025	Joe Gibbs Racing	20	Toyota	DAY; 31	ATL; 1	COA; 1	PHO; 1*	LVS; 12	HOM; 29	**MAR**; 2	DAR; 3	BRI; 8	TAL; 35	TEX; 9	KAN; 2	CLT; 8	NSH; 10	MCH; 16	MXC; 2	POC; 17	ATL; 30	CSC; 24	SON; 5	DOV; 18	IND; 8	IOW; 17	GLN; 2	RCH; 21	DAY; 13	DAR; 29	GTW; 7	BRI; 1	NHA; 6	KAN; 3	ROV; 3	LVS; 3	TAL; 8	MAR; 7	PHO; 11	5th	2403	
2026	Joe Gibbs Racing	20	Toyota	DAY; 35	ATL; 21	COA; 3	PHO; 2*	**LVS**; 4	DAR; 19	MAR; 7	BRI; 27	KAN; 20	TAL; 17*	TEX; 38	GLN; 21	CLT; 2	NSH; 2	MCH; 31	POC; 26	COR; 39	SON; 5	CHI; 2	ATL; 2	NWS; 19	IND; 2	IOW; 2	RCH; 7	NHA; 4	DAY; 17	DAR; 1	GTW; 19	BRI; 4	KAN; 6	LVS; 23	CLT; 2	PHO; 4*	TAL; 35	MAR; 10	HOM; 4	2nd	2452	

===== Daytona 500 =====
Year	Team	Manufacturer	Start	Finish
2020	Leavine Family Racing	Toyota	17	21
2021	Joe Gibbs Racing	Toyota	5	16
2022	Joe Gibbs Racing	Toyota	12	34
2023	Joe Gibbs Racing	Toyota	5	3
2024	Joe Gibbs Racing	Toyota	4	3
2025	Joe Gibbs Racing	Toyota	20	31
2026	Joe Gibbs Racing	Toyota	35	35

==== O'Reilly Auto Parts Series ====
NASCAR O'Reilly Auto Parts Series results
Year	Team	No.	Make	1	2	3	4	5	6	7	8	9	10	11	12	13	14	15	16	17	18	19	20	21	22	23	24	25	26	27	28	29	30	31	32	33	NOAPSC	Pts	Ref
2017	Joe Gibbs Racing	18	Toyota	DAY	ATL	LVS	PHO	CAL	TEX	BRI	RCH	TAL	CLT; 4	DOV	POC	MCH										ROA; 19	DAR						KAN; 1	TEX; 6	PHO; 4		91st	0^{1}	
2017	Joe Gibbs Racing	20	Toyota														**IOW**; 16*	DAY	KEN	NHA	IND	IOW	GLN	MOH	BRI			RCH; 6	CHI	KEN	DOV	CLT				HOM; 36	91st	0^{1}	
2018	Joe Gibbs Racing	20	Toyota	DAY; 39	**ATL**; 3	**LVS**; 2	PHO; 4	**CAL**; 21	TEX; 2	BRI; 29	RCH; 1*	TAL; 12	DOV; 4	CLT; 3	POC; 36	MCH; 11	IOW; 2	CHI; 12	DAY; 3	KEN; 1	NHA; 1*	IOW; 1	GLN; 9	MOH; 11	BRI; 2	ROA; 23	DAR; 34	IND; 7	LVS; 4	**RCH**; 1	ROV; 5	DOV; 1*	KAN; 37	**TEX**; 32	PHO; 1*	HOM; 11	4th	4026	
2019	Joe Gibbs Racing	20	Toyota	DAY; 6	ATL; 1*	LVS; 13	**PHO**; 30	CAL; 3	**TEX**; 3*	BRI; 1	RCH; 16	TAL; 3	DOV; 1	**CLT**; 31	POC; 5	MCH; 13	IOW; 1*	CHI; 38	DAY; 3	KEN; 2	NHA; 1*	**IOW**; 2*	GLN; 2	MOH; 2	BRI; 14	ROA; 1	DAR; 4	IND; 29	LVS; 2*	RCH; 1*	ROV; 12	DOV; 25	**KAN**; 12	TEX; 1*	**PHO**; 16*	HOM; 5	3rd	4032	
2021	Joe Gibbs Racing	54	Toyota	DAY	DRC	HOM	LVS	PHO	ATL	MAR	TAL	DAR	DOV	COA	CLT	MOH	TEX	NSH	POC	ROA	ATL	NHA; 1*	GLN	IRC	MCH	DAY; 6	DAR	RCH	BRI	LVS	TAL	ROV	TEX	KAN	MAR	PHO	75th	0^{1}	
2022	Joe Gibbs Racing	18	Toyota	DAY	CAL	LVS	PHO	ATL	COA	RCH	MAR	TAL	DOV	DAR	TEX	CLT	PIR	NSH	ROA	ATL	NHA	POC	IRC	MCH	GLN	DAY	DAR; 7	KAN	BRI	TEX	TAL	ROV	LVS	HOM	MAR	PHO	88th	0^{1}	
2024	Joe Gibbs Racing	20	Toyota	DAY	ATL	LVS	PHO	COA	RCH	MAR	TEX	TAL	DOV	DAR	CLT	PIR	SON	IOW	NHA; 1	NSH	CSC	POC	IND	MCH	DAY	**DAR**; 1*	ATL	GLN	BRI	KAN	TAL	ROV	LVS	HOM	MAR	PHO	78th	0^{1}	
2025	Joe Gibbs Racing	19	Toyota	DAY	ATL	COA	PHO	LVS	HOM	MAR	**DAR**; 25	BRI	CAR	TAL	TEX	CLT	NSH																				98th	0^{1}	
2025	Sam Hunt Racing	24	Toyota															MXC; 39	POC	ATL	CSC	SON	DOV	IND	IOW	GLN	DAY	PIR	GTW	BRI	KAN	ROV	LVS	TAL	MAR	PHO	98th	0^{1}	
2026	Joe Gibbs Racing	19	Toyota	DAY	ATL	COA	PHO	LVS	DAR; 3	MAR	CAR	BRI	KAN	TAL	TEX	GLN	DOV	CLT	NSH	POC	COR	SON	CHI	ATL	IND	IOW	DAY	DAR	GTW	BRI	LVS	CLT	PHO	TAL	MAR	HOM	75th	0^{1}	

==== Craftsman Truck Series ====
NASCAR Craftsman Truck Series results
Year	Team	No.	Make	1	2	3	4	5	6	7	8	9	10	11	12	13	14	15	16	17	18	19	20	21	22	23	24	25	NCTC	Pts	Ref
2015	Kyle Busch Motorsports	51	Toyota	DAY	ATL	MAR	KAN	CLT	DOV	TEX	GTW	IOW; 5																	27th	231	
2015	Kyle Busch Motorsports	54	Toyota										KEN; 17	ELD; 1*	POC	MCH	BRI	MSP	CHI	NHA	LVS; 14	TAL; 13	MAR	TEX; 8	PHO	HOM; 25			27th	231	
2016	Kyle Busch Motorsports	4	Toyota	DAY; 16	ATL; 26	MAR; 19	KAN; 4	DOV; 3	CLT; 8	TEX; 32	IOW; 9	GTW; 1	KEN; 4	ELD; 2	POC; 10	BRI; 7*	MCH; 24	MSP; 5	CHI; 4	NHA; 2	LVS; 6	TAL; 6	MAR; 4	TEX; 11	PHO; 7	HOM; 8			3rd	4025	
2017	Kyle Busch Motorsports	4	Toyota	DAY; 8	**ATL**; 1*	MAR; 3*	**KAN**; 4	**CLT**; 3	DOV; 25	TEX; 1*	GTW; 6	IOW; 5*	KEN; 1*	ELD; 9	POC; 1	MCH; 2	BRI; 7	MSP; 26	CHI; 3*	NHA; 1*	LVS; 2*	**TAL**; 2	MAR; 8	TEX; 3	**PHO**; 8*	HOM; 2			1st	4035	
2018	Kyle Busch Motorsports	51	Toyota	DAY	ATL	LVS	MAR	DOV	KAN	CLT	TEX	IOW	GTW	CHI	KEN	ELD	POC	MCH	**BRI**; 28	MSP	LVS	TAL	MAR	TEX	PHO	HOM			108th	0^{1}	
2023	Hattori Racing Enterprises	61	Toyota	DAY	LVS	ATL	COA	TEX	BRD	MAR	KAN	DAR	NWS; 16	CLT	GTW	NSH	MOH	POC; 4	RCH	IRP	MLW	KAN	BRI	TAL	HOM	PHO			91st	0^{1}	
2024	Tricon Garage	1	Toyota	DAY	ATL	LVS; 5	BRI	COA	MAR	TEX	KAN	DAR	NWS	CLT	GTW	NSH	POC	IRP	RCH	MLW	BRI	KAN	TAL	HOM	MAR	PHO			84th	0^{1}	
2025	Halmar Friesen Racing	52	Toyota	DAY	ATL	LVS	HOM	MAR	BRI	CAR	TEX	KAN	NWS	CLT	NSH	MCH	POC	LRP	IRP	GLN; 4	RCH	DAR	BRI	NHA	ROV	TAL	MAR	PHO	83rd	0^{1}	
2026	Halmar Friesen Racing	62	Toyota	DAY	ATL	STP	DAR; 6	CAR	BRI; 1	TEX	GLN	DOV; 5	CLT	NSH	MCH; 6	COR	LRP	NWS; 15	IRP	RCH; QL^{†}	NHA; 7	BRI	KAN	CLT	PHO	TAL	MAR	HOM	95th	0^{1}	
^{†} – Qualified but replaced by Leland Honeyman

^{*} Season still in progress
^{1} Ineligible for series points

==== Pinty's Series ====
NASCAR Pinty's Series results
Year	Team	No.	Make	1	2	3	4	5	6	7	8	9	10	11	12	13	NPSC	Pts	Ref
2017	22 Racing	22	Dodge	MOS; 23	DEL	CHA	ICA	TOR	WYA	WYA	EDM	TRO	RIV	MOS	STE	JUK	48th	21	

=== ARCA Racing Series ===
(key) (Bold – Pole position awarded by qualifying time. Italics – Pole position earned by points standings or practice time. * – Most laps led.)

ARCA Racing Series results
Year	Team	No.	Make	1	2	3	4	5	6	7	8	9	10	11	12	13	14	15	16	17	18	19	20	ARSC	Pts	Ref
2016	Venturini Motorsports	66	Toyota	DAY	NSH	SLM; 1*	TAL	TOL																25th	1085	
2016	Venturini Motorsports	15	Toyota						NJE; 10	POC	MCH	MAD	WIN	IOW	IRP	POC; 7	BLN	ISF	DSF	SLM; 1	CHI; 3	KEN	KAN	25th	1085	
2017	Venturini Motorsports	25	Toyota	DAY	NSH	SLM	TAL	TOL	ELK	POC	MCH	MAD	IOW	IRP	POC	WIN	ISF	ROA	DSF	SLM	CHI; 1	KEN	KAN	72nd	240	

==== K&N Pro Series West ====
NASCAR K&N Pro Series West results
Year	Team	No.	Make	1	2	3	4	5	6	7	8	9	10	11	12	13	14	NKNPSWC	Pts	Ref
2015	Bill McAnally Racing	54	Toyota	KCR	IRW; 15	TUS	IOW; 2	SHA	SON	SLS	IOW	EVG	CNS	MER	AAS	PHO		32nd	71	
2018	Bill McAnally Racing	60	Toyota	KCR	TUS	TUS	OSS	CNS	SON	DCS	IOW	EVG	GTW	LVS; 10	MER	AAS	KCR	40th	35	

=== CARS Late Model Stock Car Tour ===
(key) (Bold – Pole position awarded by qualifying time. Italics – Pole position earned by points standings or practice time. * – Most laps led. ** – All laps led.)

CARS Late Model Stock Car Tour results
Year	Team	No.	Make	1	2	3	4	5	6	7	8	9	10	CLMSCTC	Pts	Ref
2015	Kyle Busch Motorsports	51	Toyota	SNM	ROU	HCY	SNM	TCM	MMS	ROU	CON	MYB	HCY; 26	59th	7	

=== CARS Super Late Model Tour ===
(key)

CARS Super Late Model Tour results
Year	Team	No.	Make	1	2	3	4	5	6	7	8	9	10	11	12	13	CSLMTC	Pts	Ref
2015	Kyle Busch Motorsports	51	Toyota	SNM; 2*	ROU; 1*	HCY	SNM; 1*	TCM	MMS	ROU	CON	MYB	HCY; 1*				12th	139	
2016	Kyle Busch Motorsports	51B	Toyota	SNM	ROU; 1*	HCY	TCM	GRE	ROU	CON	MYB	HCY	SNM				39th	35	
2017	Kyle Busch Motorsports	4	Toyota	CON	DOM	DOM	HCY	HCY	BRI	AND	ROU	TCM	ROU; 12	HCY	CON	SBO	42nd	21	

=== ASA STARS National Tour ===
(key) (Bold – Pole position awarded by qualifying time. Italics – Pole position earned by points standings or practice time. * – Most laps led. ** – All laps led.)

ASA STARS National Tour results
Year	Team	No.	Make	1	2	3	4	5	6	7	8	9	10	11	12	ASNTC	Pts	Ref
2025	Wilson Motorsports	20	Toyota	NSM; 6	FIF	DOM	HCY	NPS	MAD	SLG	AND	OWO	TOL	WIN	NSV	48th	51	
2026	Wilson Motorsports	20	Toyota	NSM	FIF	HCY	SLG	MAD	NPS	OWO	TRI; 1	WIN	NSV	NSM		-*	-*	

Sporting positions
Preceded by Johnny Sauter	NASCAR Camping World Truck Series Champion; 2017	Succeeded by Brett Moffitt
Preceded by Brad Kuhn	BMARA Champion; 2014	Succeeded by David Budres
Preceded by Darren Hagen	USAC National Midget Series Champion; 2013	Succeeded by Rico Abreu
Achievements
Preceded by Ryan Blaney	Coca-Cola 600 Winner; 2024	Succeeded by Ross Chastain
Preceded by Chase Briscoe	Cook Out Southern 500 Winner; 2026	Succeeded by Incumbent
Preceded by Joey Logano	NASCAR All-Star Race Winner; 2025	Succeeded by Denny Hamlin
Preceded by Rico Abreu	Chili Bowl winner 2017, 2018, 2019	Succeeded by Kyle Larson
Preceded by Darrell Wallace Jr.	Eldora Mudsummer Classic Winner; 2015	Succeeded by Kyle Larson
Preceded by Dave Darland; Kyle Larson	Turkey Night Grand Prix winner 2014, 2017, 2018	Succeeded by Tanner Thorson
Preceded by Zach Daum	Pepsi Nationals winner 2014	Succeeded by Rico Abreu
Preceded by Jerry Coons Jr.	Belleville Midget Nationals winner 2013	Succeeded by Rico Abreu
