= Hendrick Motorsports in the NASCAR Cup Series =

Hendrick Motorsports (HMS) is an American professional auto racing organization that competes in the NASCAR Cup Series. The team was founded in 1984 as All Star Racing by Rick Hendrick. Hendrick Motorsports has won a NASCAR-record 326 Cup Series races and 16 Cup Series owners and drivers championships to go with three Truck Series owners and drivers titles and one O'Reilly Auto Parts Series drivers crown. Additionally, the team has 34 O'Reilly Auto Parts Series race wins, 26 Truck Series race wins, and 7 ARCA Menards Series wins. This page documents the statistical results of Hendrick Motorsports in the NASCAR Cup Series beginning with the team's debut in 1984.

== Cars ==
=== Car No. 5 history ===
Geoff Bodine (1984–1989)

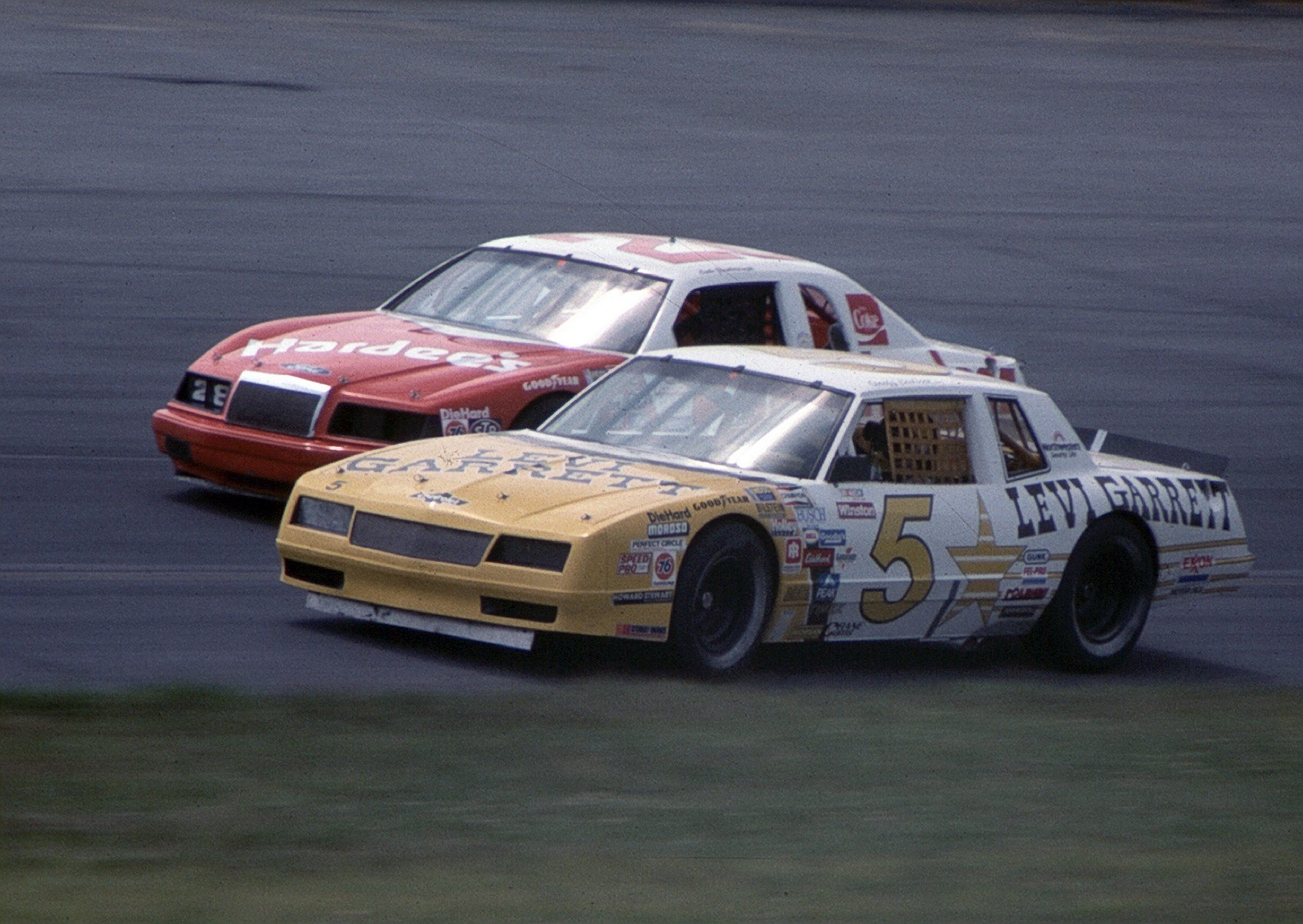
Geoff Bodine's No. 5 Levi Garrett Chevrolet in 1985

The No. 5 debuted in 1984 under the banner "All Star Racing" with five employees, rented equipment, and two cars, with the highest-paid person's wages at only $500/week. Initially, the team had planned to field a car for seven-time Cup champion Richard Petty with funding from country music business mogul C. K. Spurlock, but the deal failed to materialize. Afterwards, Hendrick attempted to hire Tim Richmond, then Dale Earnhardt, but did not. As a result, the team signed former Rookie of the Year Geoff Bodine to drive the unsponsored No. 5 Chevy Monte Carlo for 1984. Although the original plan was a partial season, Bodine agreed to drive for the team, believing in the potential of the organization. After a slow start seven races into the season, Hendrick informed Bodine and crew chief Harry Hyde that he planned to shut down the team due to funding trouble. Instead, Bodine and the team won at Martinsville, leading to sponsorship from Northwestern Security Life; on March 30, 2014, the 30-year anniversary of the win, Hendrick stated, "We owe Martinsville so much. If we hadn't won that race, then literally the next Monday we were going to shut it down." The team won two more times and finished ninth in points. Levi Garrett came on to sponsor the No. 5 Chevy in 1985 as part of a multi-year deal. Despite not winning a race that year, Bodine earned three poles and improved to fifth in points. The team briefly became a two-car operation when Dick Brooks drove the No. 1 Exxon Chevy at Charlotte, in what proved to be Brooks' last NASCAR race.

Hendrick expanded into a multi-car team full-time in 1986, with Bodine and Tim Richmond as drivers. Bodine won twice, including the 1986 Daytona 500, in the No. 5 and posted an eighth-place finish in points. His younger brother, Brett, raced as a teammate in the World 600 that year. Bodine went winless again in 1987, finishing thirteenth in points. Bodine won one race and finishing in the Top 10 of the point standings each of the next two years before leaving for Junior Johnson & Associates in 1990.

Ricky Rudd (1990–1993)

Ricky Rudd took Bodine's place, winning once at Watkins Glen International, and finishing seventh in points. For 1991, the team received sponsorship from Tide as part of the car's merger with Darrell Waltrip's old team. Winning one race that year, Rudd finished a career high second in points behind champion Dale Earnhardt. On the final lap of that year's race at Sonoma, second-place Rudd spun out leader Davey Allison on the last turn and went on to win. NASCAR penalized the team for rough driving and awarded Allison the win. Rudd won once each of the next two years. Dissatisfied with the distribution of resources within HMS's multiple teams, Rudd left to form Rudd Performance Motorsports, taking Tide with him.

Terry Labonte (1994–2004)

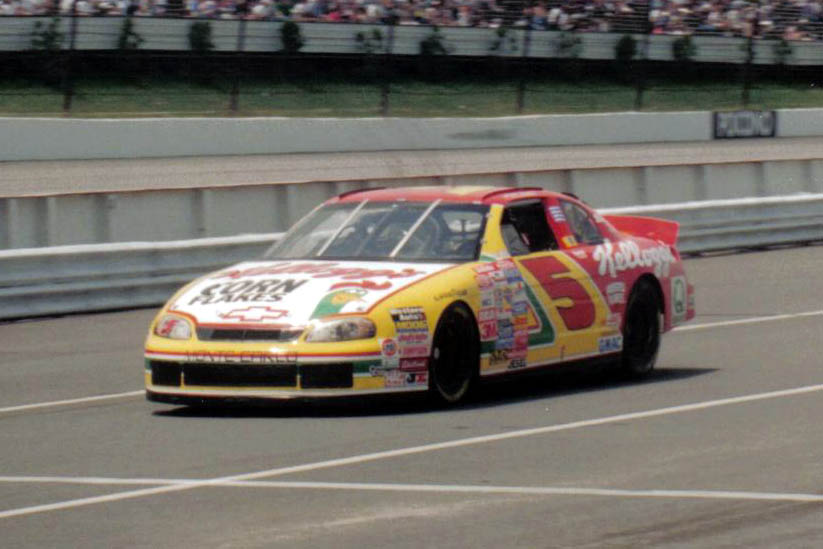
Terry Labonte's No. 5 Kellogg's Chevrolet in 1997

Rudd's replacement was 1984 Winston Cup champion Terry Labonte. The car received sponsorship from Kellogg's and their Corn flakes brand. Labonte won three races each in 1994 and 1995, and defeated teammate Jeff Gordon for the 1996 Winston Cup championship by 37 points. Labonte won one race each of the next three seasons. The 2000 season was a very difficult year for the team as two long streaks that defined Labonte's career came to an end. In the Pepsi 400, Labonte crashed his car and broke his leg. After an accident at New Hampshire damaged his inner ear, Labonte was not capable of driving, and he ended up missing two races, bringing his streak of most consecutive races to an abrupt end. Todd Bodine and Ron Hornaday Jr. subbed for Labonte. His six-year winning streak was also broken as he failed to visit victory lane that year.

At the end of the 2000 season Labonte's team switched to Kellogg's Frosted Flakes brand for its primary sponsorship. After a couple of low-key years, Labonte finished tenth in the points in 2003. He also revisited victory lane after a four-year drought by winning the Southern 500 at Darlington, the last Southern 500 to be held during the Labor Day weekend until 2015. After slipping to 26th in points in 2004, Labonte announced his semi-retirement. He would drive a limited schedule for two years in the No. 44 car before leaving HMS after the 2006 season. Labonte scored 12 victories with Hendrick Motorsports, to go along with his championship in 1996.

Kyle Busch (2005–2007)

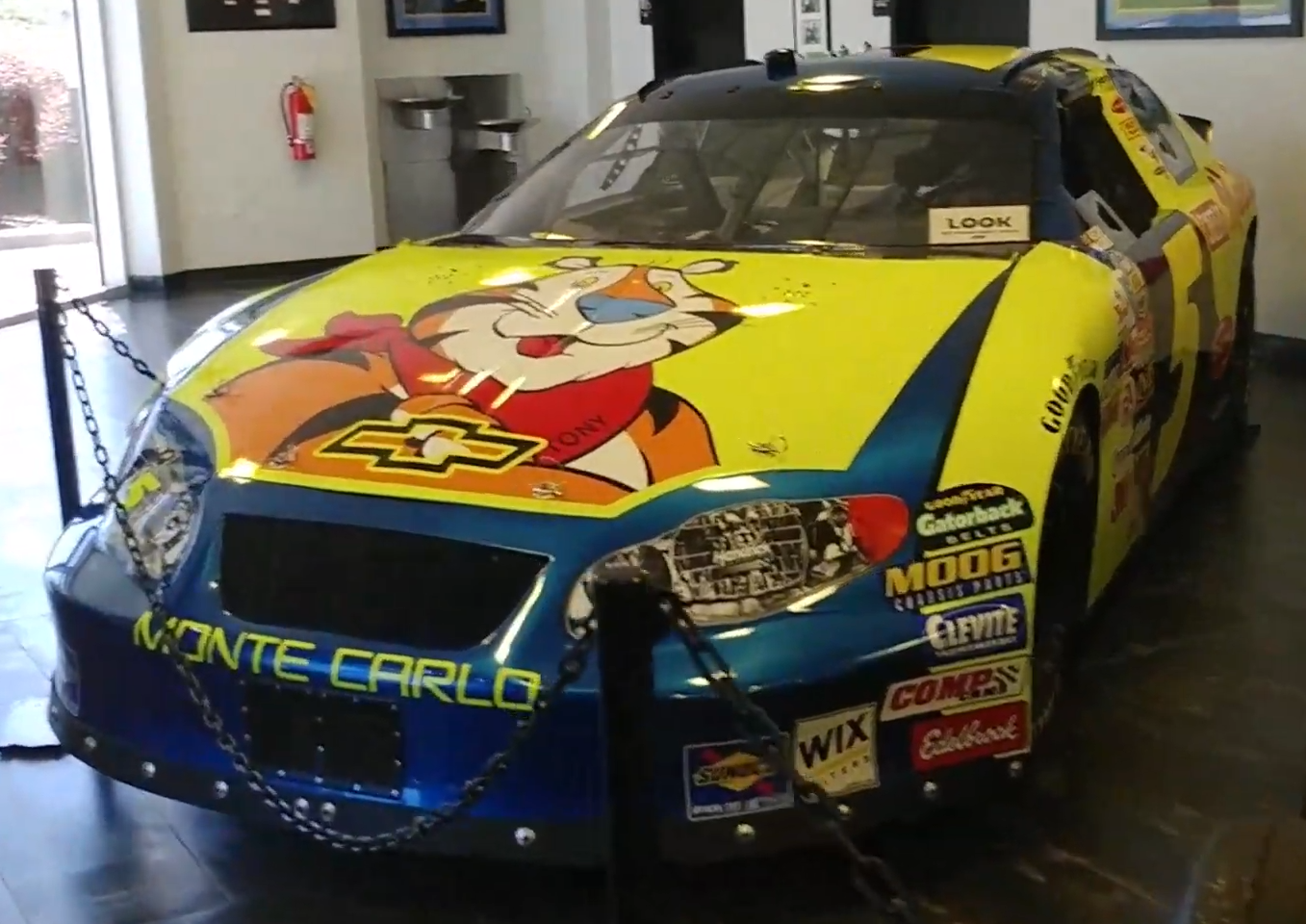
Busch's 2005 Sony HD 500 race-winning car

Hendrick tabbed development driver Kyle Busch, the younger brother of Kurt Busch, as Labonte's replacement for the 2005 season. Over the season, Busch earned 2 wins, 9 top fives and 13 top tens and finished 20th in the season standings. He easily won the 2005 Rookie of the year battle and made history when he took the checkered flag in the Sony HD 500 at Fontana for his first win, becoming the youngest driver at the time to ever win a Cup Series race at the age of 20 years, 4 months, and 2 days. Busch would win later that year at Phoenix. In 2006, Kyle won once and qualified for the Chase for the Nextel Cup, ultimately finishing 10th in points, with one win, ten top-fives and 18 top-tens. In 2007, Busch grabbed a win at the Food City 500, the inaugural race for the Car of Tomorrow and finished fifth in the final standings, with 1 win, 11 top fives and 20 top tens. On June 13, 2007, Hendrick announced that Kyle Busch would not return to drive the No. 5 car in 2008.

Casey Mears (2008) & Mark Martin (2009–2011)

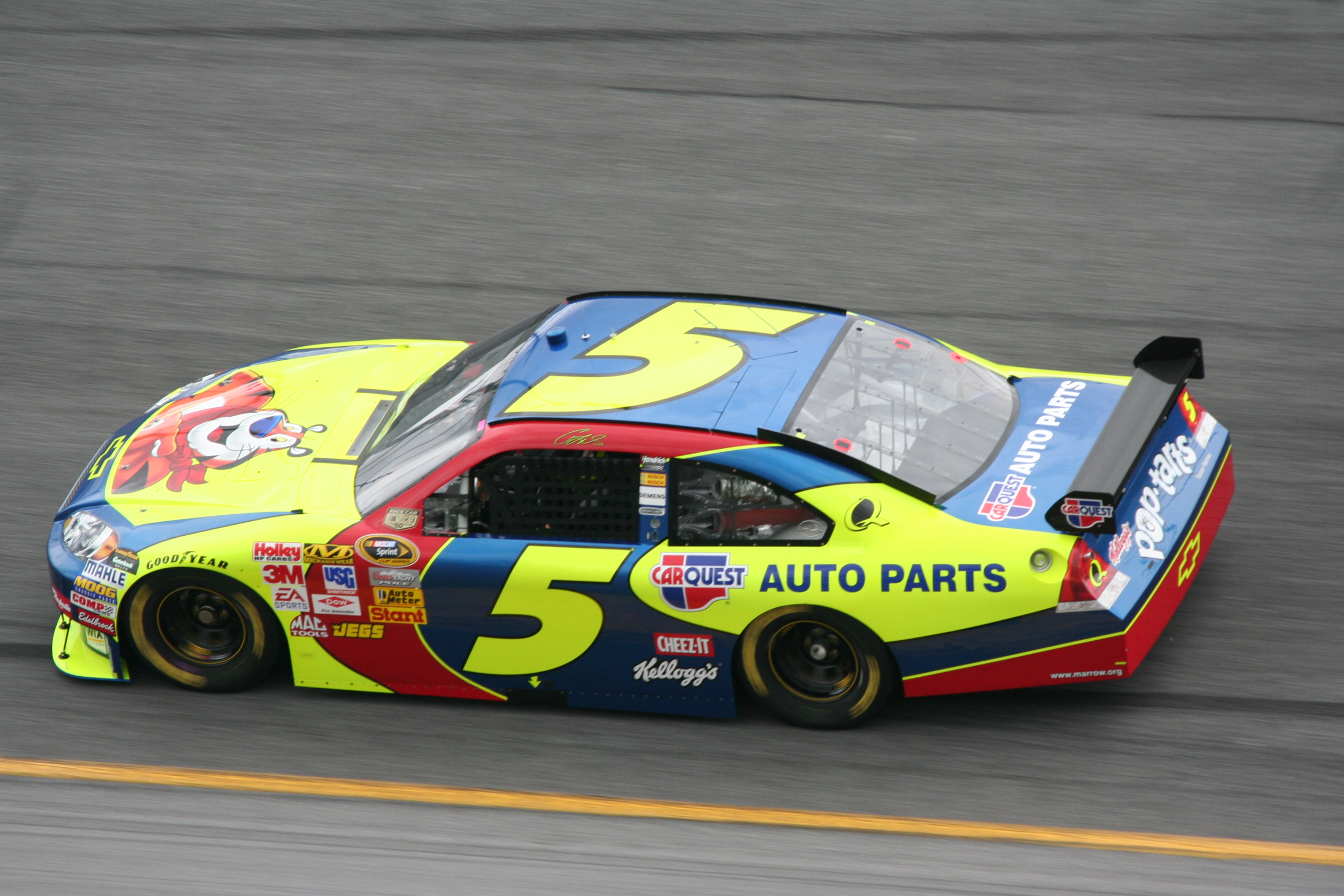
Casey Mears' No. 5 Kellogg's / Carquest Chevrolet in 2008

On September 4, 2007 it was announced that Casey Mears would drive the No. 5 in 2008. On June 22, 2008, ESPN.com reported that Mark Martin would leave Dale Earnhardt, Inc. to replace Casey Mears in the No. 5 car for the 2009 season. On Friday, July 4 at Daytona, Hendrick and Martin announced that Martin had agreed to a two-year contract in the No. 5 car.

Mark Martin scored his first win with Hendrick Motorsports at Phoenix on April 18, 2009. He became the third oldest winner and fourth driver over the age of 50 to win a Cup Series race. The win was also the 36th victory and 400th top 10 of Martin's career. Martin won four more races in 2009, Darlington, Michigan, Chicagoland, and New Hampshire. He also won seven pole positions and finished second in the point standings to teammate Jimmie Johnson. On September 18, 2009, Hendrick announced that Martin had extended his contract through the 2011 season and would race full-time with GoDaddy.com as a primary sponsor.

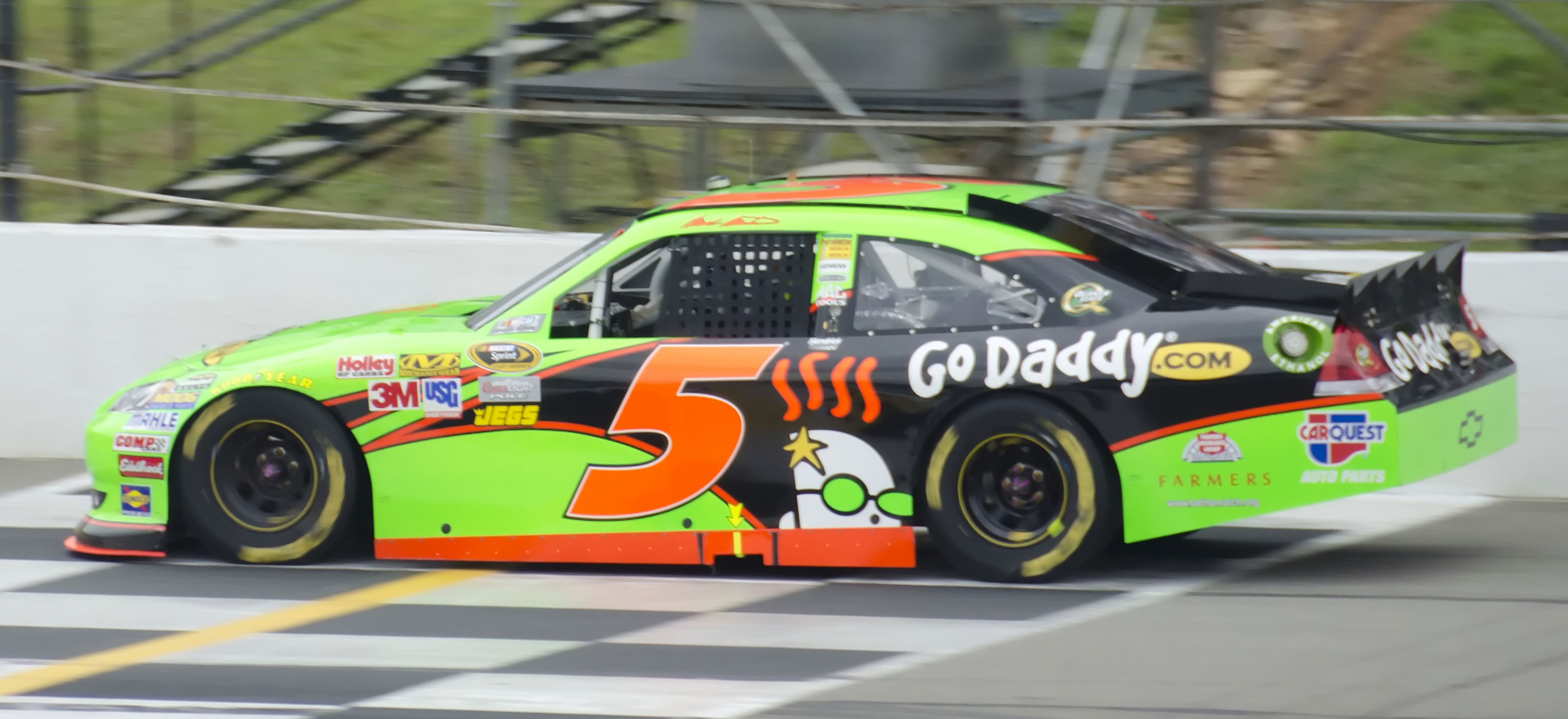
Mark Martin in the No. 5 at Pocono in 2011

In 2010, Martin struggled, ending the season 13th in the point standings with no wins and only one pole position, which came in the Daytona 500. His season best finish of second came in October at Martinsville. Lance McGrew took over as crew chief for the No. 5 in 2011 as Gustafson moved to Jeff Gordon's team. Farmers Insurance Group and Quaker State joined as sponsors of the team for a few races. Martin struggled through most of the season with McGrew, not showing signs of his earlier Hendrick success. Teammate Jimmie Johnson drove the No. 5 car in the All-Star Race to promote a discount deal with Lowe's (Martin moved over to the No. 25 for the evening). Martin ended the year 22nd in points, having won two pole positions, the second races at both Daytona and Talladega. The team scored only two top fives all season, a second at Dover and a fourth at Michigan.

Kasey Kahne (2012–2017)

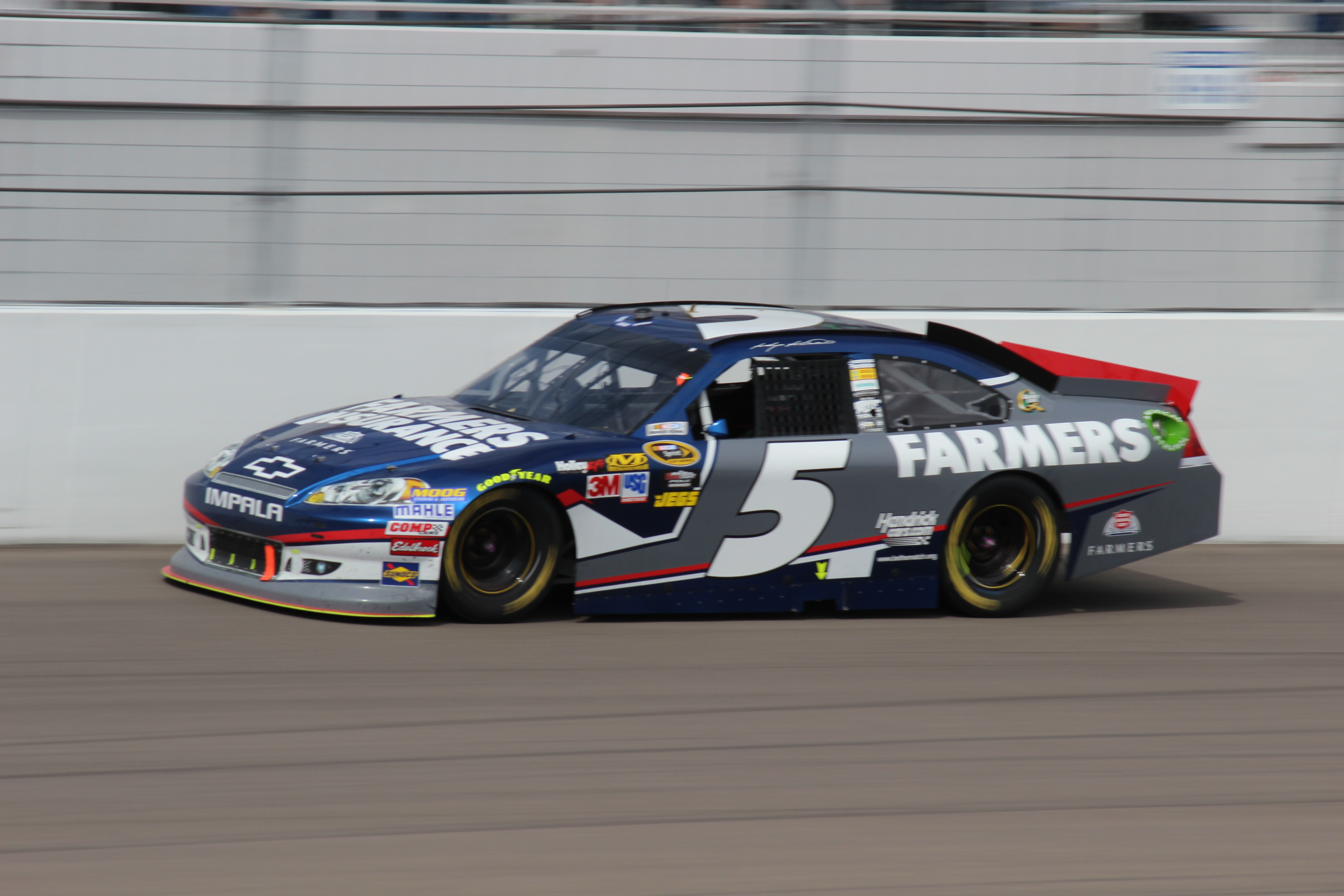
Kasey Kahne in the No. 5 at Las Vegas in 2012

Kasey Kahne and his crew chief Kenny Francis were picked up from Red Bull Racing Team to run the No. 5 in 2012. Farmers and Quaker State returned, with Farmers increasing its sponsorship to 22 races. GoDaddy.com left for Tommy Baldwin Racing/Stewart–Haas Racing to sponsor Danica Patrick, but Time Warner Cable and Great Clips signed on as replacements. After a poor start to the season, Kahne rebounded immensely and picked up a win in the Coca-Cola 600. He won again at New Hampshire in July and made the 2012 Chase, finishing a career-best 4th in standings. Kahne also won four pole positions throughout the season.

Kahne won twice in 2013, at Bristol in March and Pocono in August, and again qualified for the Chase in 2013. However, he fell toward the bottom of the Chase standings and ended up finishing 12th in points. The team struggled immensely in 2014, and it did not appear that Kahne would qualify for the 2014 Chase until a last-minute win at Atlanta in late August locked him into the Chase field. Kahne was eliminated from the Chase following the October Talladega race (as a result of a new Chase format) and finished 15th in the final point standings. Kahne then struggled in 2015 & 2016 as he barely missed the Chase field and failed to reach victory lane in both seasons. On July 23, 2017, Kahne held off Brad Keselowski in an overtime finish that ended under caution to win the 2017 Brickyard 400 for his 18th (& final) overall career victory, 102 races after his 2014 Atlanta victory. The race was also the reason that the NASCAR sanctioning body eliminated the Overtime Line.

On August 20, 2017, Hendrick Motorsports announced that William Byron would take over the No. 5 in 2018, with Darian Grubb as crew chief. Twenty days later, the team announced a number change from No. 5 to No. 24 in 2018, with Chase Elliott's team renumbered from No. 24 to No. 9. Kahne was locked into the Chase field in 2017 with his Brickyard 400 victory but was eliminated after the first round and finishing 15th in the final point standings. Following Kahne's departure, the No. 5 would remain dormant for the next three seasons.

Kyle Larson (2021–present)

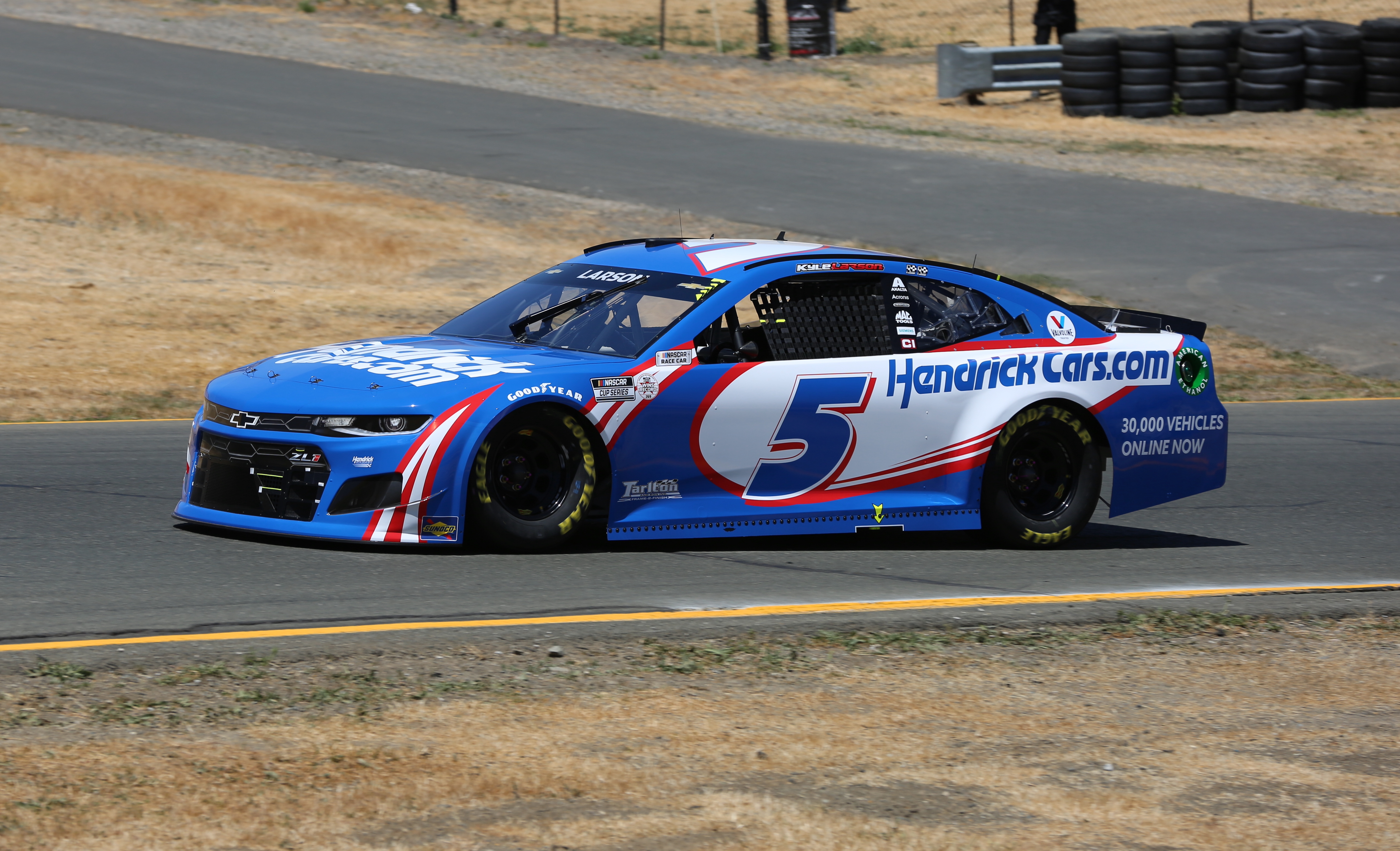
Kyle Larson in the No. 5 at Sonoma in 2021

On October 28, 2020, it was announced that Kyle Larson would join Hendrick Motorsports for the 2021 season driving the No. 5 car, which replaced the No. 88. The controversy surrounding Larson scared away many sponsors, leading Hendrick to sponsor the driver through his auto dealership company Hendrick Automotive Group, via HendrickCars.com and Nationsguard. Larson would also gain sponsorship from Valvoline, Freightliner, Cincinnati Inc., Metrotech Automotive and Tarlton & Sons. Larson won the Pennzoil 400 at Las Vegas in his fourth start with the team. After three straight second-place finishes at Darlington, Dover, and Circuit of the Americas in May, Larson followed with back-to-back-to-back wins in the Coca-Cola 600, Toyota/Save Mart 350 and the Ally 400. Larson won his fifth race at the 2021 Go Bowling at The Glen, resulting in him tying for the points lead with Denny Hamlin. Following the 2021 Coke Zero Sugar 400 at Daytona, Larson clinched the Regular Season Championship. Larson won the Bristol Night Race to advance to the Round of 12. He went on to win three straight races at the Charlotte ROVAL Race (advancing to the Round of 8), Texas (clinching a spot in the Championship 4) and Kansas. At Phoenix in the Season Finale 500, Larson won the race (his 10th of the season) to secure his first Cup Series Championship. Larson's championship ended a 25-year championship drought for the No. 5 car, when Terry Labonte won the then-called Winston Cup Championship in 1996.

Larson began his 2022 season with a 32nd place finish at the 2022 Daytona 500. He then won at Fontana. On June 14, 2022, crew chief Cliff Daniels was suspended for four races due to a tire and wheel loss during the 2022 Toyota/Save Mart 350 at Sonoma. Larson scored his second win of the season at Watkins Glen. Larson was eliminated in the Round of 12 after finishing 35th at the Charlotte Roval. At Las Vegas, Larson charged aggressively past Kevin Harvick and Bubba Wallace, causing Wallace to scrape the outside wall. Wallace retaliated by wrecking himself and Larson down the frontstretch, severely damaging Christopher Bell's car in the process. During the caution, Wallace engaged in a shoving match with Larson. A week later, Larson won at Homestead after leading 199 out of the race's 267 laps.

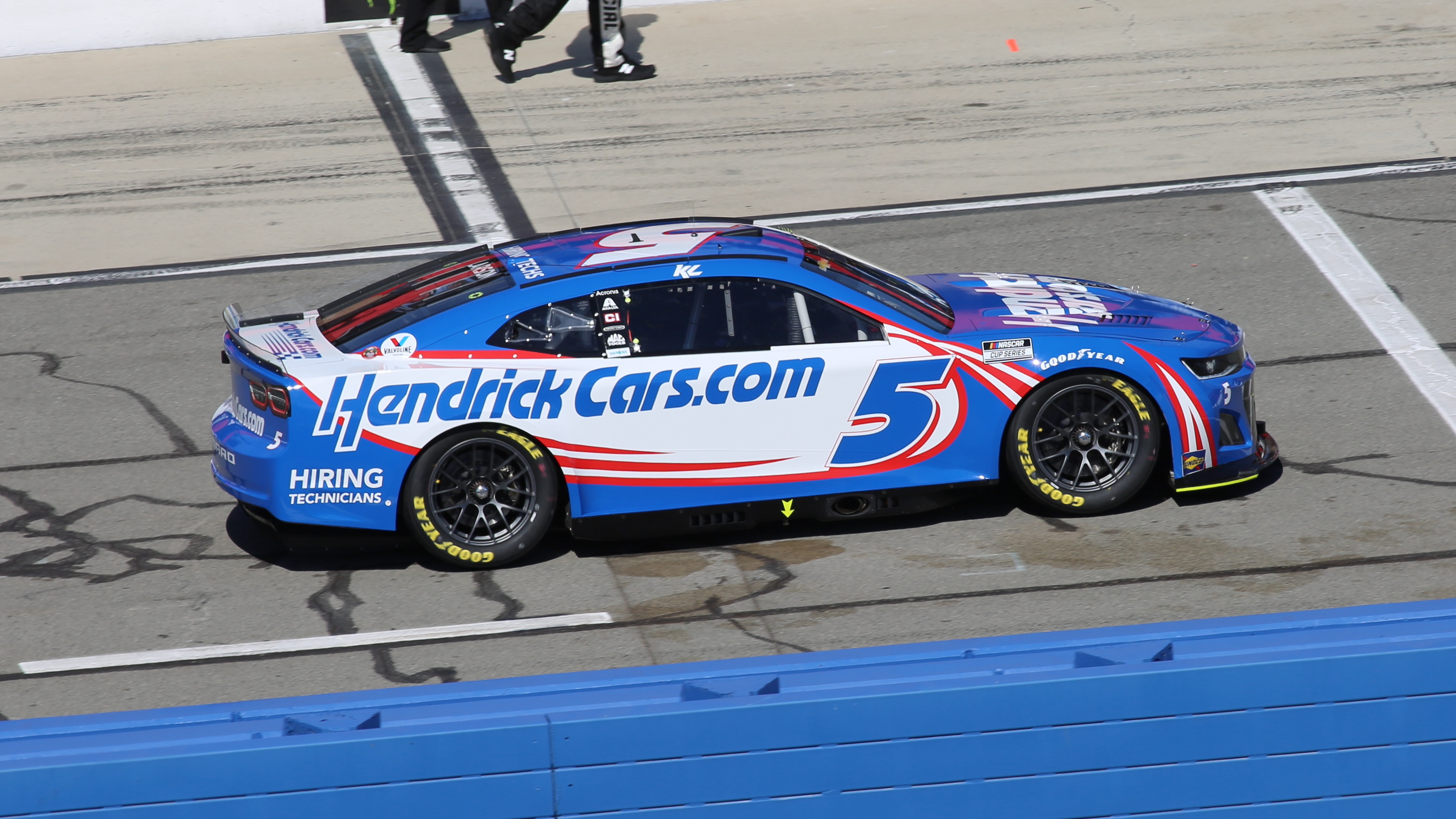
Kyle Larson in the No. 5 at Fontana in 2022

Larson began the 2023 season with an 18th place finish at the 2023 Daytona 500. On March 15, the No. 5 was served an L2 penalty after unapproved hood louvers were found installed on the car during pre-race inspection at Phoenix; as a result, the team was docked 100 driver and owner points and 10 playoff points. In addition, Daniels was suspended for four races and fined US$100,000. On March 29, the National Motorsports Appeals Panel amended the penalty, upholding the fine and Daniels' suspension but restoring the owner, driver, and playoff points. Larson scored wins at Richmond and Martinsville. In addition, he won his third career All-Star Race. During the playoffs, Larson scored a win at Darlington, securing him to the Round of 12 and giving Hendrick Motorsports' engine department its overall 500th win. Larson then won at Las Vegas to make the Championship 4. Following the season finale at Phoenix, Larson finished the 2023 season second in the points standings.

Larson started the 2024 season with an 11th place finish at the 2024 Daytona 500. He scored his first win of the season at Las Vegas two weeks later. At Kansas, Larson beat Chris Buescher by 0.001 seconds - the closest finish in NASCAR Cup Series history. On May 26, Larson attempted to do "The Double" at the 2024 Indianapolis 500 and the 2024 Coca-Cola 600, but due to a rain delay, he was unable to make the Charlotte race and was substituted by Justin Allgaier, who finished 13th. Despite missing the Charlotte race, Larson was granted a waiver to remain eligible in the playoffs. He continued the regular season with wins at Sonoma and Indianapolis. At the Bristol Night Race, Larson dominated by leading 462 of 500 laps, breaking a Hendrick Motorsports record for most laps led in a race. Two weeks later, he scored his sixth win of the season at the Charlotte Roval and advanced into the Round of 8.

Larson started the 2025 season with a 20th place finish at the 2025 Daytona 500. Over a month later, he won at Homestead. Larson also won at Bristol and Kansas. Larson advance all the way to the championship race, where he won his second championship with a third place finish.

On February 11, 2026, Larson signed a five-year contract extension to remain with HMS through 2031. Larson began the 2026 season with a 16th-place finish at the Daytona 500. Larson scored his first win of the season at Gateway, broke a 51-race winless streak. Two weeks later, Larson scored his second win of the season at Kansas. He won his third race of the season at the fall Talladega race, after falling from leading to 11th on the final lap before rallying back to the lead over the last half lap. After building a substantial point lead into the final race of the season, Larson clinched his third championship after the first stage at Homestead.

==== Car No. 5 results ====
Year	Driver	No.	Make	1	2	3	4	5	6	7	8	9	10	11	12	13	14	15	16	17	18	19	20	21	22	23	24	25	26	27	28	29	30	31	32	33	34	35	36	Owners	Pts.
1984	Geoff Bodine	5	Chevy	DAY; 8	RCH; 9	CAR; 6	ATL; 13	BRI; 25	NWS; 14	DAR; 35	MAR; 1	TAL; 34	NSV; 3	DOV; 10	CLT; 5	RSD; 4	POC; 36	MCH; 7	DAY; 12	NSV; 1*	POC; 12	TAL; 26	MCH; 34	BRI; 22	DAR; 12	RCH; 4	DOV; 9	MAR; 28	CLT; 6	NWS; 23	CAR; 19	ATL; 24*	RSD; 1							9th	3734
1985	Geoff Bodine	5	Chevy	DAY; 7	RCH; 2	CAR; 12	ATL; 2	BRI; 18	DAR; 7	NWS; 5	MAR; 3	TAL; 11	DOV; 11	CLT; 16	RSD; 22	POC; 4*	MCH; 11	DAY; 14	POC; 4	TAL; 23	MCH; 23	BRI; 25	DAR; 3	RCH; 7	DOV; 25	MAR; 24	NWS; 2	CLT; 3	CAR; 5	ATL; 11	RSD; 6									5th	3862
1986	Geoff Bodine	5	Chevy	DAY; 1*	RCH; 8	CAR; 20	ATL; 10	BRI; 24	DAR; 40	NWS; 3	MAR; 17	TAL; 27	DOV; 1	CLT; 31	RSD; 39	POC; 9	MCH; 3	DAY; 29	POC; 3*	TAL; 23	GLN; 19*	MCH; 4	BRI; 3	DAR; 8	RCH; 13	DOV; 28	MAR; 2*	NWS; 2*	CLT; 6	CAR; 32	ATL; 38	RSD; 3*								8th	3678
1987	Geoff Bodine	5	Chevy	DAY; 14	CAR; 32	RCH; 2	ATL; 15	DAR; 11	NWS; 28	BRI; 19	MAR; 3	TAL; 40	CLT; 18	DOV; 28	POC; 9	RSD; 27	MCH; 11	DAY; 39	POC; 34	TAL; 13	GLN; 15	MCH; 10	BRI; 6	DAR; 18	RCH; 6	DOV; 6	MAR; 20	NWS; 5	CLT; 31	CAR; 8	RSD; 10*	ATL; 31								13th	3328
1988	Geoff Bodine	5	Chevy	DAY; 14	RCH; 13	CAR; 18	ATL; 33	DAR; 7	BRI; 3	NWS; 9	MAR; 15	TAL; 3*	CLT; 24	DOV; 8	RSD; 34	POC; 1*	MCH; 5	DAY; 16	POC; 4	TAL; 2	GLN; 32	MCH; 10	BRI; 3	DAR; 7	RCH; 22	DOV; 5	MAR; 5	CLT; 31	NWS; 3	CAR; 30	PHO; 6	ATL; 15								5th	3799
1989	Geoff Bodine	5	Chevy	DAY; 4	CAR; 4	ATL; 19	RCH; 18*	DAR; 3	BRI; 3	NWS; 7	MAR; 16	TAL; 12	CLT; 4	DOV; 29	SON; 20	POC; 35	MCH; 27	DAY; 22	POC; 17	TAL; 35	GLN; 21	MCH; 5	BRI; 16	DAR; 12	RCH; 3	DOV; 27	MAR; 16	CLT; 22	NWS; 1	CAR; 7	PHO; 28	ATL; 2								9th	3600
1990	Ricky Rudd	5	Chevy	DAY; 4	RCH; 3	CAR; 31	ATL; 27	DAR; 24	BRI; 3	NWS; 4	MAR; 23	TAL; 33	CLT; 28	DOV; 11	SON; 3	POC; 32	MCH; 9	DAY; 13	POC; 7	TAL; 5	GLN; 1	MCH; 5	BRI; 10	DAR; 7	RCH; 8	DOV; 32	MAR; 28*	NWS; 11	CLT; 6	CAR; 7	PHO; 32	ATL; 16								7th	3601
1991	Ricky Rudd	5	Chevy	DAY; 9	RCH; 2*	CAR; 4	ATL; 6	DAR; 1	BRI; 5*	NWS; 11	MAR; 11	TAL; 13	CLT; 9	DOV; 10	SON; 2	POC; 20	MCH; 8	DAY; 9	POC; 20	TAL; 4	GLN; 2	MCH; 11	BRI; 5	DAR; 15	RCH; 5	DOV; 7	MAR; 8	NWS; 12	CLT; 32	CAR; 12	PHO; 11	ATL; 11								2nd	4092
1992	Ricky Rudd	5	Chevy	DAY; 40	CAR; 28	RCH; 6	ATL; 12	DAR; 5	BRI; 6	NWS; 3	MAR; 23	TAL; 26	CLT; 9	DOV; 6	SON; 4	POC; 36	MCH; 5	DAY; 7	POC; 4	TAL; 4*	GLN; 13	MCH; 36	BRI; 8	DAR; 10	RCH; 6	DOV; 1	MAR; 10	NWS; 15	CLT; 5	CAR; 3	PHO; 30	ATL; 25								7th	3735
1993	Ricky Rudd	5	Chevy	DAY; 30	CAR; 12	RCH; 15	ATL; 5	DAR; 19	BRI; 26	NWS; 7	MAR; 29	TAL; 41	SON; 3	CLT; 37	DOV; 35	POC; 9	MCH; 1	DAY; 4	NHA; 5	POC; 11	TAL; 24	GLN; 24	MCH; 35*	BRI; 22	DAR; 6	RCH; 4	DOV; 21	MAR; 4	NWS; 5	CLT; 8	CAR; 14	PHO; 6	ATL; 2							10th	3644
1994	Terry Labonte	5	Chevy	DAY; 3	CAR; 17	RCH; 9	ATL; 14	DAR; 35	BRI; 24	NWS; 1	MAR; 15	TAL; 32	SON; 28	CLT; 35	DOV; 26	POC; 18	MCH; 20	DAY; 15	NHA; 11	POC; 15	TAL; 10	IND; 12	GLN; 6	MCH; 8	BRI; 33	DAR; 10	RCH; 1*	DOV; 7	MAR; 14	NWS; 2	CLT; 7	CAR; 5	PHO; 1*	ATL; 8						8th	3876
1995	Terry Labonte	5	Chevy	DAY; 8	CAR; 26	RCH; 1	ATL; 3	DAR; 34	BRI; 7	NWS; 16	MAR; 36	TAL; 26	SON; 5	CLT; 2	DOV; 37	POC; 1	MCH; 9	DAY; 19	NHA; 4	POC; 14	TAL; 33	IND; 13	GLN; 5	MCH; 2	BRI; 1	DAR; 19	RCH; 2	DOV; 15	MAR; 2	NWS; 4	CLT; 3	CAR; 4	PHO; 13	ATL; 13						6th	4146
1996	Terry Labonte	5	Chevy	DAY; 24*	CAR; 34*	RCH; 8	ATL; 2	DAR; 5	BRI; 2	NWS; 1*	MAR; 24	TAL; 4	SON; 5	CLT; 3	DOV; 2	POC; 7	MCH; 2	DAY; 2	NHA; 6	POC; 16	TAL; 24	IND; 3	GLN; 2	MCH; 3	BRI; 5	DAR; 26	RCH; 5	DOV; 21	MAR; 2	NWS; 5	CLT; 1*	CAR; 3	PHO; 3	ATL; 5						1st	4657
1997	Terry Labonte	5	Chevy	DAY; 2	CAR; 7	RCH; 7	ATL; 9	DAR; 13	TEX; 4*	BRI; 3	MAR; 4	SON; 3	TAL; 6	CLT; 8	DOV; 14	POC; 9	MCH; 39	CAL; 2	DAY; 2	NHA; 7	POC; 35	IND; 40	GLN; 8	MCH; 10	BRI; 7	DAR; 6	RCH; 17	NHA; 41	DOV; 37	MAR; 22	CLT; 11	TAL; 1*	CAR; 7	PHO; 11	ATL; 21					6th	4177
1998	Terry Labonte	5	Chevy	DAY; 13	CAR; 8	LVS; 15	ATL; 12	DAR; 6	BRI; 2	TEX; 6	MAR; 26	TAL; 4*	CAL; 3	CLT; 41	DOV; 10	RCH; 1	MCH; 19	POC; 12	SON; 42	NHA; 14	POC; 31	IND; 9	GLN; 40	MCH; 36	BRI; 13	NHA; 39	DAR; 25	RCH; 21	DOV; 18	MAR; 6	CLT; 38	TAL; 3	DAY; 6	PHO; 10	CAR; 8	ATL; 8				9th	3901
1999	Terry Labonte	5	Chevy	DAY; 38	CAR; 7	LVS; 8	ATL; 13	DAR; 11	TEX; 1*	BRI; 13	MAR; 15	TAL; 39	CAL; 9	RCH; 26	CLT; 11	DOV; 17	MCH; 23	POC; 16	SON; 29	DAY; 10	NHA; 11	POC; 6	IND; 11	GLN; 11	MCH; 26	BRI; 8	DAR; 17	RCH; 43	NHA; 31	DOV; 27	MAR; 40	CLT; 21	TAL; 34	CAR; 14	PHO; 28	HOM; 31	ATL; 40			12th	3580
2000	Terry Labonte	5	Chevy	DAY; 7	CAR; 17	LVS; 31	ATL; 15	DAR; 11	BRI; 5	TEX; 8	MAR; 23	TAL; 7	CAL; 33	RCH; 2	CLT; 22	DOV; 11	MCH; 26	POC; 12	SON; 27	DAY; 41	NHA; 43	POC; 11			MCH; 20	BRI; 16	DAR; 15	RCH; 25	NHA; 25	DOV; 13	MAR; 17	CLT; 27	TAL; 5	CAR; 38	PHO; 17	HOM; 25	ATL; 17			15th	3669
2000	Todd Bodine	5	Chevy																				IND; 15																	15th	3669
2000	Ron Hornaday Jr.	5	Chevy																					GLN; 15																15th	3669
2001	Terry Labonte	5	Chevy	DAY; 24	CAR; 29	LVS; 22	ATL; 5	DAR; 38	BRI; 6	TEX; 13	MAR; 23	TAL; 11	CAL; 30	RCH; 38	CLT; 23	DOV; 17	MCH; 26	POC; 31	SON; 36	DAY; 40	CHI; 25	NHA; 32	POC; 34	IND; 19	GLN; 21	MCH; 29	BRI; 10	DAR; 11	RCH; 38	DOV; 17	KAN; 27	CLT; 27	MAR; 34	TAL; 13	PHO; 20	CAR; 28	HOM; 11	ATL; 32	NHA; 27	27th	3280
2002	Terry Labonte	5	Chevy	DAY; 20	CAR; 16	LVS; 38	ATL; 14	DAR; 23	BRI; 16	TEX; 10	MAR; 6	TAL; 20	CAL; 21	RCH; 33	CLT; 12	DOV; 15	POC; 38	MCH; 31	SON; 3	DAY; 14	CHI; 13	NHA; 22	POC; 9	IND; 13	GLN; 31	MCH; 33	BRI; 30	DAR; 31	RCH; 41	NHA; 30	DOV; 38	KAN; 12	TAL; 38	CLT; 21	MAR; 22	ATL; 25	CAR; 32	PHO; 26	HOM; 28	25th	3417
2003	Terry Labonte	5	Chevy	DAY; 30	CAR; 27	LVS; 16	ATL; 20	DAR; 24	BRI; 39	TEX; 16	TAL; 5	MAR; 14	CAL; 12	RCH; 21	CLT; 21	DOV; 10	POC; 7	MCH; 10	SON; 25	DAY; 4	CHI; 15	NHA; 20	POC; 5	IND; 19	GLN; 18	MCH; 13	BRI; 11	DAR; 1	RCH; 8	NHA; 18	DOV; 20	TAL; 22	KAN; 16	CLT; 18	MAR; 6	ATL; 33	PHO; 30	CAR; 12	HOM; 15	10th	4162
2004	Terry Labonte	5	Chevy	DAY; 20	CAR; 17	LVS; 17	ATL; 24	DAR; 19	BRI; 18	TEX; 41	MAR; 23	TAL; 25	CAL; 7	RCH; 18	CLT; 37	DOV; 7	POC; 7	MCH; 26	SON; 40	DAY; 8	CHI; 6	NHA; 16	POC; 6	IND; 38	GLN; 39	MCH; 27	BRI; 15	CAL; 19	RCH; 18	NHA; 24	DOV; 27	TAL; 21	KAN; 21	CLT; 25	MAR; 25	ATL; 31	PHO; 32	DAR; 28	HOM; 31	27th	3519
2005	Kyle Busch	5	Chevy	DAY; 38	CAL; 23	LVS; 2	ATL; 12	BRI; 28	MAR; 39	TEX; 21	PHO; 8	TAL; 41	DAR; 23	RCH; 4	CLT; 25	DOV; 2	POC; 4	MCH; 9	SON; 40	DAY; 31	CHI; 14	NHA; 4	POC; 39	IND; 10	GLN; 33	MCH; 43	BRI; 33	CAL; 1*	RCH; 4	NHA; 27	DOV; 2	TAL; 33	KAN; 21	CLT; 39	MAR; 9	ATL; 12	TEX; 40	PHO; 1	HOM; 41	20th	3753
2006	Kyle Busch	5	Chevy	DAY; 23	CAL; 10	LVS; 3	ATL; 12	BRI; 8	MAR; 5	TEX; 15	PHO; 36	TAL; 32	RCH; 5	DAR; 7	CLT; 38	DOV; 5	POC; 22	MCH; 14	SON; 11	DAY; 2	CHI; 3	NHA; 1*	POC; 12	IND; 7	GLN; 9	MCH; 39	BRI; 2	CAL; 8	RCH; 2*	NHA; 38	DOV; 40	KAN; 7	TAL; 11	CLT; 6	MAR; 18	ATL; 27	TEX; 4	PHO; 38	HOM; 38	10th	6027
2007	Kyle Busch	5	Chevy	DAY; 24	CAL; 9	LVS; 9	ATL; 32	BRI; 1	MAR; 4	TEX; 37	PHO; 7	TAL; 37	RCH; 2	DAR; 37	CLT; 30	DOV; 17	POC; 8	MCH; 6	SON; 8	NHA; 11	DAY; 2	CHI; 13	IND; 4	POC; 12	GLN; 7	MCH; 13	BRI; 9	CAL; 3*	RCH; 20	NHA; 4	DOV; 5	KAN; 41	TAL; 36	CLT; 3	MAR; 4	ATL; 20	TEX; 4*	PHO; 8	HOM; 20	5th	6293
2008	Casey Mears	5	Chevy	DAY; 35	CAL; 42	LVS; 13	ATL; 17	BRI; 42	MAR; 7	TEX; 22	PHO; 11	TAL; 7	RCH; 36	DAR; 35	CLT; 29	DOV; 17	POC; 26	MCH; 30	SON; 5	NHA; 7	DAY; 34	CHI; 33	IND; 26	POC; 22	GLN; 19	MCH; 18	BRI; 41	CAL; 26	RCH; 11	NHA; 37	DOV; 15	KAN; 14	TAL; 14	CLT; 29	MAR; 6	ATL; 12	TEX; 14	PHO; 36	HOM; 8	21st	3527
2009	Mark Martin	5	Chevy	DAY; 16	CAL; 40	LVS; 40	ATL; 31	BRI; 6	MAR; 7	TEX; 6	PHO; 1^{*}	TAL; 43	RCH; 5	DAR; 1	CLT; 17	DOV; 10	POC; 19	MCH; 1	SON; 35	NHA; 14	DAY; 38	CHI; 1^{*}	IND; 2	POC; 7	GLN; 23	MCH; 31	BRI; 2^{*}	ATL; 5	RCH; 4	NHA; 1	DOV; 2	KAN; 7	CAL; 4	CLT; 17	MAR; 8	TAL; 28	TEX; 4	PHO; 4	HOM; 12	2nd	6511
2010	Mark Martin	5	Chevy	DAY; 12	CAL; 4	LVS; 4	ATL; 33	BRI; 35	MAR; 21	PHO; 4	TEX; 6	TAL; 5	RCH; 25	DAR; 16	DOV; 15	CLT; 4	POC; 29	MCH; 16	SON; 14	NHA; 21	DAY; 28	CHI; 15	IND; 11	POC; 7	GLN; 19	MCH; 28	BRI; 23	ATL; 21	RCH; 20	NHA; 29	DOV; 12	KAN; 14	CAL; 6*	CLT; 14	MAR; 2	TAL; 11	TEX; 3	PHO; 8	HOM; 16	13th	4364
2011	Mark Martin	5	Chevy	DAY; 10	PHO; 13	LVS; 18	BRI; 12	CAL; 20	MAR; 10	TEX; 36	TAL; 8	RCH; 14	DAR; 19	DOV; 2	CLT; 34	KAN; 21	POC; 18	MCH; 9	SON; 19	DAY; 33	KEN; 22	NHA; 22	IND; 8	POC; 13	GLN; 25	MCH; 4	BRI; 38	ATL; 17	RCH; 10	CHI; 9	NHA; 24	DOV; 19	KAN; 10	CLT; 37	TAL; 20	MAR; 28	TEX; 19	PHO; 16	HOM; 24	22nd	930
2012	Kasey Kahne	5	Chevy	DAY; 29	PHO; 34	LVS; 19	BRI; 37	CAL; 14	MAR; 38	TEX; 7	KAN; 8	RCH; 5	TAL; 4	DAR; 8	CLT; 1	DOV; 9	POC; 29	MCH; 33	SON; 14	KEN; 2	DAY; 7	NHA; 1	IND; 12	POC; 2	GLN; 13	MCH; 3	BRI; 9	ATL; 23	RCH; 12	CHI; 3	NHA; 5	DOV; 15	TAL; 12	CLT; 8	KAN; 4	MAR; 3	TEX; 25	PHO; 4	HOM; 21	4th	2345
2013	Kasey Kahne	5	Chevy	DAY; 36	PHO; 19	LVS; 2*	BRI; 1	CAL; 9	MAR; 4	TEX; 11	KAN; 2	RCH; 21	TAL; 42	DAR; 17	CLT; 2*	DOV; 23	POC; 36	MCH; 38	SON; 6	KEN; 11	DAY; 32	NHA; 11	IND; 3	POC; 1*	GLN; 34	MCH; 7	BRI; 2	ATL; 36	RCH; 14	CHI; 12	NHA; 37	DOV; 13	KAN; 15	CLT; 2*	TAL; 36	MAR; 27	TEX; 5	PHO; 2	HOM; 13	12th	2283
2014	Kasey Kahne	5	Chevy	DAY; 31	PHO; 11	LVS; 8	BRI; 8	CAL; 41	MAR; 22	TEX; 11	DAR; 37	RCH; 14	TAL; 8	KAN; 3	CLT; 14	DOV; 19	POC; 42	MCH; 5	SON; 6	KEN; 8	DAY; 27	NHA; 11	IND; 6*	POC; 10	GLN; 12	MCH; 16	BRI; 35	ATL; 1	RCH; 17	CHI; 13	NHA; 23	DOV; 20	KAN; 22	CLT; 10	TAL; 12	MAR; 40	TEX; 38	PHO; 21	HOM; 12	15th	2234
2015	Kasey Kahne	5	Chevy	DAY; 9	ATL; 14	LVS; 17	PHO; 4	CAL; 17	MAR; 11	TEX; 8	BRI; 37	RCH; 6	TAL; 34	KAN; 17	CLT; 12	DOV; 4	POC; 13	MCH; 15	SON; 8	DAY; 32	KEN; 27	NHA; 19	IND; 24	POC; 43	GLN; 42	MCH; 15	BRI; 16	DAR; 12	RCH; 18	CHI; 24	NHA; 9	DOV; 6	CLT; 43	KAN; 4	TAL; 19	MAR; 9	TEX; 20	PHO; 26	HOM; 19	18th	939
2016	Kasey Kahne	5	Chevy	DAY; 13	ATL; 23	LVS; 10	PHO; 22	CAL; 28	MAR; 22	TEX; 8	BRI; 17	RCH; 4	TAL; 39	KAN; 16	DOV; 4	CLT; 22	POC; 6	MCH; 13	SON; 9	DAY; 30	KEN; 14	NHA; 25	IND; 18	POC; 15	GLN; 20	BRI; 13	MCH; 14	DAR; 7	RCH; 6	CHI; 7	NHA; 9	DOV; 12	CLT; 3	KAN; 10	TAL; 35	MAR; 11	TEX; 8	PHO; 13	HOM; 37	17th	898
2017	Kasey Kahne	5	Chevy	DAY; 7	ATL; 4	LVS; 12	PHO; 20	CAL; 20	MAR; 14	TEX; 38	BRI; 20	RCH; 22	TAL; 5	KAN; 15	CLT; 35	DOV; 17	POC; 35	MCH; 21	SON; 24	DAY; 18	KEN; 38	NHA; 28	IND; 1	POC; 11	GLN; 16	MCH; 38	BRI; 24	DAR; 24	RCH; 12	CHI; 21	NHA; 35	DOV; 14	CLT; 9	TAL; 8	KAN; 15	MAR; 16	TEX; 11	PHO; 19	HOM; 33	15th	2198
2021	Kyle Larson	5	Chevy	DAY; 10	DRC; 30	HOM; 4	LVS; 1*	PHO; 7	ATL; 2*	BRD; 29	MAR; 5	RCH; 18	TAL; 40	KAN; 19*	DAR; 2	DOV; 2*	COA; 2	CLT; 1*	SON; 1*	NSS; 1*	POC; 9	POC; 2	ROA; 16	ATL; 18	NHA; 7	GLN; 1	IRC; 3*	MCH; 3*	DAY; 20	DAR; 2*	RCH; 6	BRI; 1*	LVS; 10	TAL; 37	ROV; 1	TEX; 1*	KAN; 1*	MAR; 14	PHO; 1*	1st	5040
2022	Kyle Larson	5	Chevy	DAY; 32	CAL; 1	LVS; 2	PHO; 34	ATL; 30	COA; 29	RCH; 5	MAR; 19	BRD; 4	TAL; 4	DOV; 6	DAR; 36	KAN; 2	CLT; 9	GTW; 12	SON; 15	NSS; 4	ROA; 3	ATL; 13	NHA; 14	POC; 5	IRC; 35	MCH; 7	RCH; 14	GLN; 1	DAY; 37	DAR; 12	KAN; 8	BRI; 5	TEX; 9	TAL; 18	ROV; 35	LVS; 35	HOM; 1*	MAR; 2	PHO; 9	7th	2354
2023	Kyle Larson	5	Chevy	DAY; 18	CAL; 29	LVS; 2	PHO; 4*	ATL; 31	COA; 14	RCH; 1	BRD; 35	MAR; 1	TAL; 33	DOV; 32	KAN; 2*	DAR; 20	CLT; 30	GTW; 4	SON; 8	NSS; 5	CSC; 4	ATL; 36	NHA; 3	POC; 20	RCH; 19	MCH; 5	IRC; 8	GLN; 26	DAY; 27	DAR; 1	KAN; 4*	BRI; 2	TEX; 31	TAL; 15	ROV; 13	LVS; 1*	HOM; 34*	MAR; 6	PHO; 3	2nd	5034
2024	Kyle Larson	5	Chevy	DAY; 11	ATL; 32	LVS; 1*	PHO; 14	BRI; 5	COA; 17	RCH; 3	MAR; 2	TEX; 21*	TAL; 21	DOV; 2	KAN; 1	DAR; 34		GTW; 10	SON; 1	IOW; 34	NHA; 4	NSS; 8	CSC; 39	POC; 13	IND; 1	RCH; 7	MCH; 34	DAY; 21	DAR; 4*	ATL; 37	GLN; 12	BRI; 1*	KAN; 26	TAL; 4	ROV; 1*	LVS; 11	HOM; 13	MAR; 3	PHO; 4	6th	2344
2024	Justin Allgaier	5	Chevy														CLT; 13																							6th	2344
2025	Kyle Larson	5	Chevy	DAY; 20	ATL; 3	COA; 32	PHO; 3	LVS; 9*	HOM; 1	MAR; 5	DAR; 37	BRI; 1*	TAL; 2	TEX; 4*	KAN; 1*	CLT; 37	NSS; 8	MCH; 5	MXC; 36	POC; 7	ATL; 17	CSC; 13	SON; 35	DOV; 4	IND; 2	IOW; 28	GLN; 39	RCH; 6	DAY; 6	DAR; 19	GTW; 12	BRI; 32	NHA; 7	KAN; 6	ROV; 2	LVS; 2*	TAL; 26	MAR; 5	PHO; 3	1st	5034
2026	Kyle Larson	5	Chevy	DAY; 16	ATL; 32	COA; 6	PHO; 3	LVS; 7	DAR; 32	MAR; 9	BRI; 3*	KAN; 2	TAL; 40	TEX; 34	GLN; 23	CLT; 5	NSS; 23	MCH; 4	POC; 5	COR; 3	SON; 4	CHI; 34	ATL; 34	NWS; 15	IND; 39	IOW; 33	RCH; 6	NHA; 5	DAY; 31	DAR; 5*	GTW; 1	BRI; 2	KAN; 1*	LVS; 2	CLT; 6*	PHO; 34	TAL; 1	MAR; 9	HOM; 12	1st	2501

=== Car No. 9 history ===
Chase Elliott (2018–present)

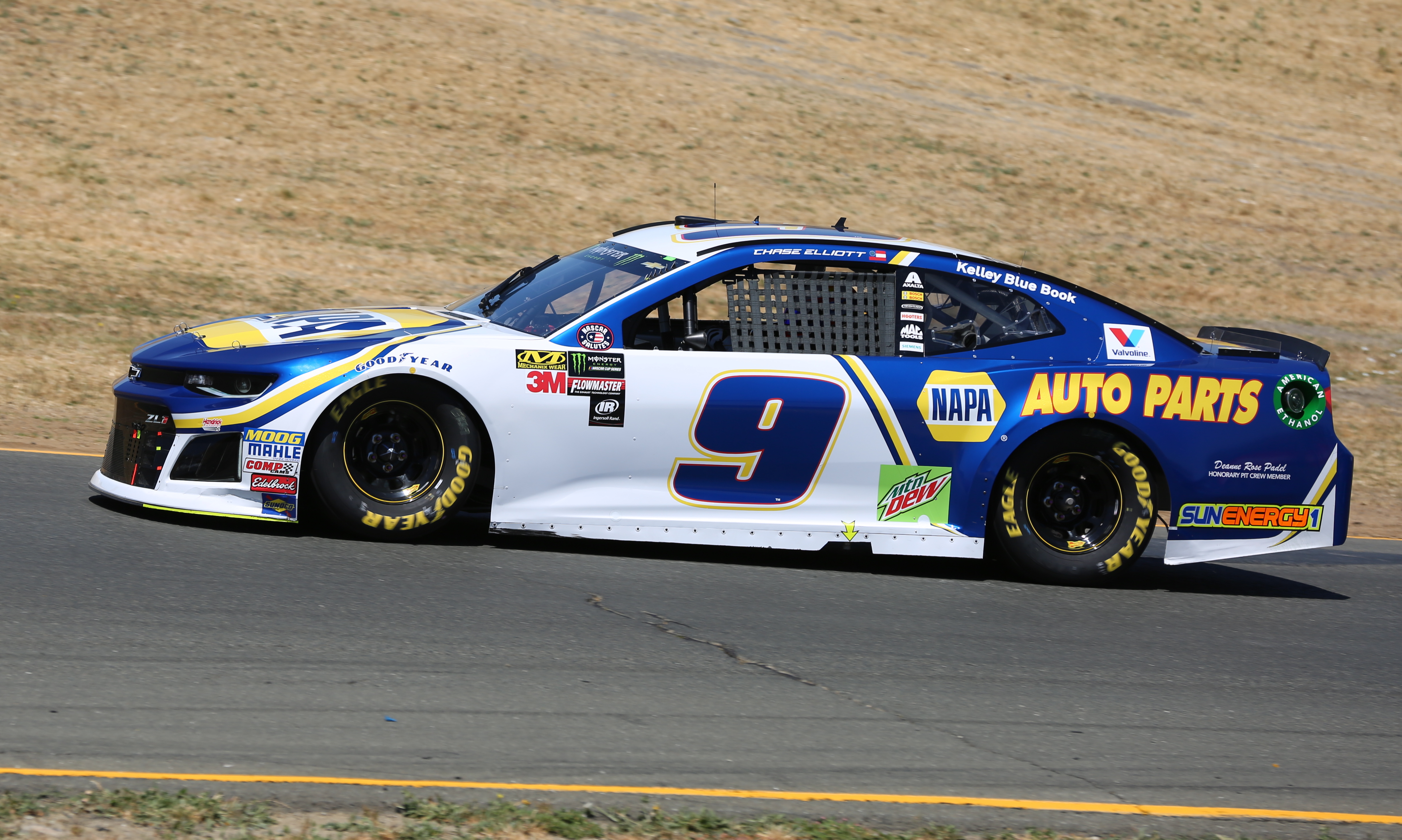
Chase Elliott in the No. 9 at Sonoma in 2018

Following the 2017 season, the No. 24 car driven by Chase Elliott was renumbered to No. 9 in honor of Elliott's father, 1988 NASCAR Winston Cup Series champion Bill Elliott. After struggling through the first half of the 2018 season, Elliott scored his first stage win at New Hampshire. On August 5, Elliott scored his first NASCAR Cup Series win at Watkins Glen, giving Hendrick Motorsports its 250th win and securing Elliott a Playoff spot. He added wins at Dover and Kansas during the Playoffs, and made it to the Round of 8 before a late crash at Phoenix effectively eliminated Elliott from championship contention. He finished the season sixth in points.

Elliott scored just two top 10 finishes in the first nine races of the 2019 season before reeling off five straight top-five finishes, including his first career superspeedway win at Talladega. He later won at Watkins Glen for the second consecutive year. However, inconsistency, including six DNFs, plagued the team for the entire season. Elliott finished the season in tenth place, just ahead of teammates William Byron and Alex Bowman.

Prior to the 2020 Pennzoil 400, car chief Matt Barndt was ejected after the No. 9 car twice failed pre-race inspection. Elliott won the first two stages of the race before hitting the wall and finishing 26th. Elliott would go on to win the 2020 All-Star Race at Bristol and the inaugural 2020 Go Bowling 235 road course race at Daytona. He also that year won the series championship, Chase's first in the Cup series. Elliott's championship was HMS' 13th championship. In 2021, Elliott won the inaugural 2021 Texas Grand Prix at COTA following that up with two straight runner-up finishes. He finished 13th at the inaugural 2021 Ally 400 at Nashville, but was disqualified when his car had five loose lug nuts during post-race inspection. Following the 2021 Foxwoods Resort Casino 301 at Loudon, the No. 9 was docked 25 points after one of the team's assigned engines was allocated to the No. 48.

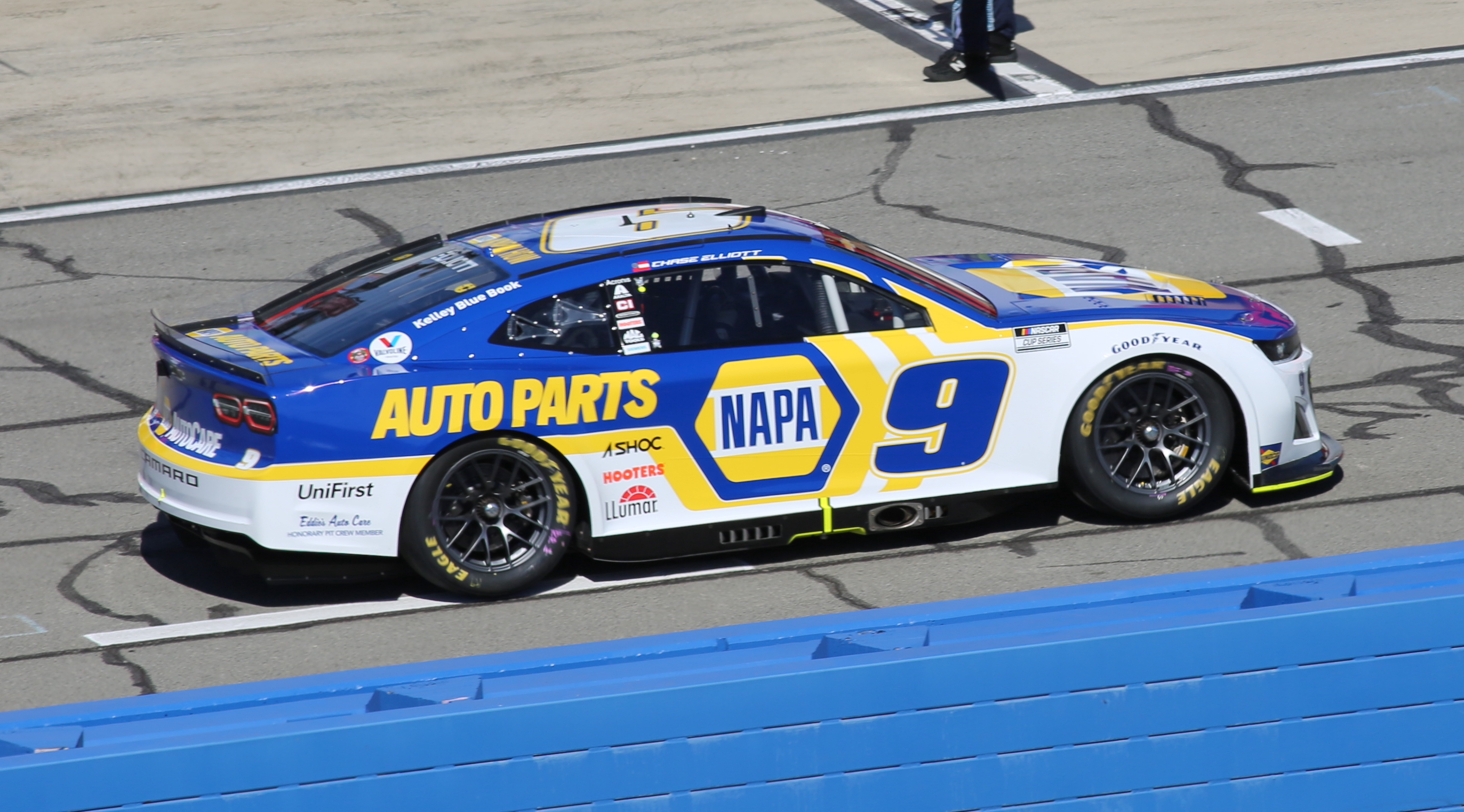
Chase Elliott in the No. 9 at Fontana in 2022

Elliott started the 2022 season with a tenth place finish at the 2022 Daytona 500. He scored wins at Dover, Nashville, and the Atlanta summer race. He originally finished third at Pocono, but was declared the winner after first- and second-place finishers Denny Hamlin and Kyle Busch were disqualified. Following his fourth-place finish at Watkins Glen, Elliott was awarded the 2022 regular season championship. During the playoffs, he won at Talladega to clinch a spot in the Round of 8, his second career victory at the track and series-high fifth win of the season; also equaling his career-best from his championship-winning season in 2020. Elliott finished 28th at the Phoenix finale after being spun to the inside wall by Ross Chastain with 119 laps to go. As a result of the finish, he finished fourth in the points standings.

Elliott began the 2023 season with a 38th place finish at the 2023 Daytona 500, but rebounded with a second-place finish at Fontana a week later. On March 3, Xfinity Series driver Josh Berry was announced to drive the No. 9 as a substitute after Elliott sustained a leg injury from snowboarding in Colorado. On March 15, the No. 9 was served an L2 penalty after unapproved hood louvers were found installed on the car during pre-race inspection at Phoenix; as a result, the team was docked 100 driver and owner points and 10 playoff points. In addition, Gustafson was suspended for four races and fined US$100,000. The penalty did not affect Elliott due to his injury while the substitute drivers of the No. 9 were ineligible for points. IMSA driver Jordan Taylor drove the car to a 24th place finish in his NASCAR debut at COTA. On March 29, the National Motorsports Appeals Panel amended the penalty, upholding the fine and Gustafson's suspension but restoring the owner and playoff points. Berry finished second at Richmond, his career best in the Cup Series. Elliott returned to the No. 9 at Martinsville, finishing in 10th. At Charlotte, Elliott was put in the wall by Denny Hamlin, who got loose underneath him. In retaliation, Elliott intentionally right rear hooked Hamlin, wrecking both cars in the process. The next day, NASCAR suspended Elliott for one race. Corey LaJoie was announced as the substitute driver of the No. 9 at Gateway. Because he was unable to win a race to make up for all the races he missed, Elliott missed the playoffs for the first time in his Cup career. Nevertheless, due to the points collected by the substitute drivers, the No. 9 was eligible for the owners' playoffs. As a result, Elliott finished 17th in the drivers' points standings, while the No. 9 finished 10th in the owners' points standings.

Elliott started the 2024 season with a 14th place finish at the 2024 Daytona 500. On April 14, he won at Texas, breaking a 42-race winless streak. This also marked Hooters' first win as a sponsor since Alan Kulwicki's championship run in 1992. On July 30, Hendrick Motorsports sued Hooters for US$1.705 million for unpaid sponsorship. The lawsuit was settled in March 2025, with Hooters agreeing to pay HMS US$900,000. During the playoffs, Elliott was winless, but he scored four top-three finishes; however, DNFs at Talladega and Las Vegas resulted in him being eliminated after the Round of 8, finishing seventh in the points standings.

In 2025, Elliott opened the season with a victory at the Cook Out Clash. He finished 15th at the 2025 Daytona 500. After staying consistent throughout the year, Elliott earned his 20th career victory at Atlanta after passing Brad Keselowski on the final lap. During the playoffs, he won at Kansas to advance to the Round of 8.

Elliott began the 2026 season with a fourth place finish at the 2026 Daytona 500. During the regular season, he scored wins at Martinsville and Texas.

==== Car No. 9 results ====
Year	Driver	No.	Make	1	2	3	4	5	6	7	8	9	10	11	12	13	14	15	16	17	18	19	20	21	22	23	24	25	26	27	28	29	30	31	32	33	34	35	36	Owners	Pts
2018	Chase Elliott	9	Chevy	DAY; 33	ATL; 10	LVS; 34	PHO; 3	CAL; 16	MAR; 9	TEX; 11	BRI; 29	RCH; 2	TAL; 3	DOV; 12	KAN; 12	CLT; 11	POC; 10	MCH; 9	SON; 4	CHI; 19	DAY; 34	KEN; 13	NHA; 5	POC; 7	GLN; 1*	MCH; 9	BRI; 3	DAR; 5	IND; 15	LVS; 36	RCH; 4	ROV; 6	DOV; 1	TAL; 31	KAN; 1	MAR; 7	TEX; 6	PHO; 23	HOM; 7	6th	2350
2019	Chase Elliott	9	Chevy	DAY; 17	ATL; 19	LVS; 9	PHO; 14	CAL; 11	MAR; 2	TEX; 13	BRI; 11	RCH; 15	TAL; 1*	DOV; 5*	KAN; 4	CLT; 4	POC; 4	MCH; 20	SON; 37	CHI; 11	DAY; 35	KEN; 15	NHA; 29	POC; 38	GLN; 1*	MCH; 9	BRI; 5	DAR; 19	IND; 9	LVS; 4	RCH; 13	ROV; 1*	DOV; 38	TAL; 8	KAN; 2	MAR; 36	TEX; 32	PHO; 39	HOM; 15	10th	2275
2020	Chase Elliott	9	Chevy	DAY; 17	LVS; 26	CAL; 4	PHO; 7*	DAR; 4	DAR; 38	CLT; 2	CLT; 1	BRI; 22	ATL; 8	MAR; 5	HOM; 2	TAL; 38	POC; 25	POC; 4	IND; 11	KEN; 23	TEX; 12	KAN; 12	NHA; 9	MCH; 7	MCH; 9	DRC; 1*	DOV; 5	DOV; 39	DAY; 2	DAR; 20	RCH; 5	BRI; 7	LVS; 22	TAL; 5	ROV; 1*	KAN; 6	TEX; 20	MAR; 1*	PHO; 1*	1st	5040
2021	Chase Elliott	9	Chevy	DAY; 2	DRC; 21*	HOM; 14	LVS; 13	PHO; 5	ATL; 38	BRD; 10	MAR; 2	RCH; 12	TAL; 24	KAN; 5	DAR; 7	DOV; 3	COA; 1	CLT; 2	SON; 2	NSH; 39	POC; 12	POC; 27	ROA; 1*	ATL; 7	NHA; 18	GLN; 2	IRC; 4	MCH; 8	DAY; 8	DAR; 31	RCH; 4	BRI; 25	LVS; 2	TAL; 18	ROV; 12	TEX; 7	KAN; 2	MAR; 16	PHO; 5	4th	5032
2022	Chase Elliott	9	Chevy	DAY; 10	CAL; 26	LVS; 9	PHO; 11	ATL; 6	COA; 4	RCH; 14	MAR; 10	BRD; 8	TAL; 7	DOV; 1	DAR; 5	KAN; 29	CLT; 33	GTW; 21	SON; 8	NSS; 1	ROA; 2*	ATL; 1*	NHA; 2	POC; 1	IRC; 16	MCH; 11	RCH; 5	GLN; 4*	DAY; 29*	DAR; 36	KAN; 11	BRI; 2	TEX; 32	TAL; 1	ROV; 20*	LVS; 21	HOM; 14	MAR; 10	PHO; 28	7th	2313
2023	Chase Elliott	9	Chevy	DAY; 38	CAL; 2							MAR; 10	TAL; 12	DOV; 11	KAN; 7	DAR; 3	CLT; 34		SON; 5	NSS; 4	CSC; 3	ATL; 13	NHA; 12	POC; 10	RCH; 13	MCH; 36	IRC; 2	GLN; 32	DAY; 4	DAR; 8	KAN; 6	BRI; 7	TEX; 11	TAL; 7	ROV; 9	LVS; 31	HOM; 15	MAR; 17	PHO; 16	10th	2296
2023	Josh Berry	9	Chevy			LVS; 29	PHO; 10	ATL; 18		RCH; 2	BRD; 27																													10th	2296
2023	Jordan Taylor	9	Chevy						COA; 24																															10th	2296
2023	Corey LaJoie	9	Chevy															GTW; 21																						10th	2296
2024	Chase Elliott	9	Chevy	DAY; 14	ATL; 15	LVS; 12	PHO; 19	BRI; 8	COA; 16	RCH; 5	MAR; 3	TEX; 1	TAL; 15	DOV; 5	KAN; 3	DAR; 12	CLT; 7	GTW; 13	SON; 4	IOW; 3	NHA; 18	NSS; 18	CSC; 21	POC; 9	IND; 10	RCH; 9	MCH; 15	DAY; 36	DAR; 11	ATL; 8	GLN; 19	BRI; 2	KAN; 9	TAL; 29	ROV; 5	LVS; 33	HOM; 5	MAR; 2	PHO; 8	7th	2342
2025	Chase Elliott	9	Chevy	DAY; 15	ATL; 20	COA; 4	PHO; 10	LVS; 10	HOM; 18	MAR; 4	DAR; 8	BRI; 15	TAL; 5	TEX; 16	KAN; 15	CLT; 6	NSS; 15	MCH; 15	MXC; 3	POC; 5	ATL; 1	CSC; 16	SON; 3	DOV; 6*	IND; 13	IOW; 14	GLN; 26	RCH; 38	DAY; 10	DAR; 17	GTW; 3	BRI; 38	NHA; 5	KAN; 1	ROV; 8	LVS; 18	TAL; 40	MAR; 3	PHO; 10	8th	2310
2026	Chase Elliott	9	Chevy	DAY; 4	ATL; 11	COA; 7	PHO; 23	LVS; 2	DAR; 15	MAR; 1	BRI; 22	KAN; 8	TAL; 4	TEX; 1*	GLN; 24	CLT; 37	NSS; 7	MCH; 32	POC; 11	COR; 12	SON; 17	CHI; 11	ATL; 13	NWS; 17	IND; 37	IOW; 15	RCH; 5	NHA; 25	DAY; 23	DAR; 14	GTW; 31	BRI; 23	KAN; 8	LVS; 7	CLT; 12	PHO; 3	TAL; 36	MAR; 2	HOM; 22	12th	2287

=== Car No. 17 history ===
Darrell Waltrip (1987–1990)

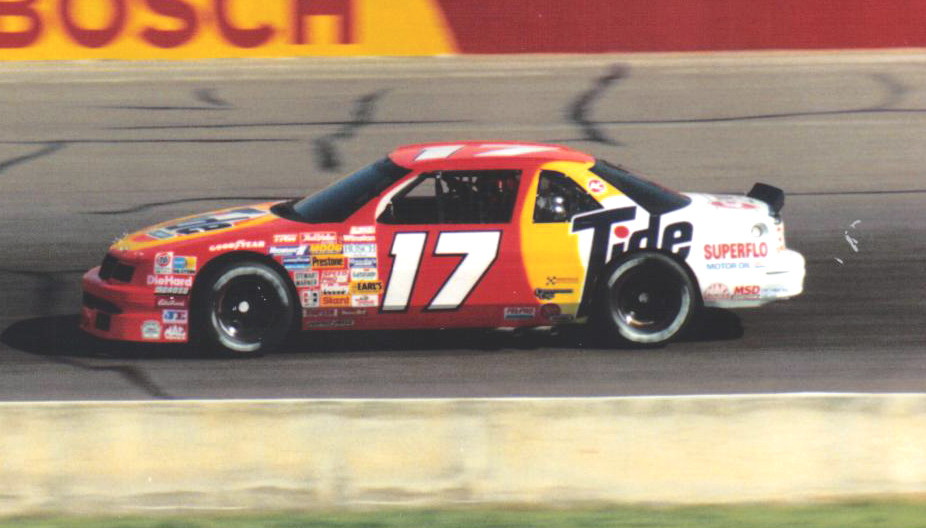
Darrell Waltrip's No. 17 Tide Chevrolet in 1989

The No. 17 car came about when Darrell Waltrip left Junior Johnson & Associates following the 1986 season to join Hendrick Motorsports with Tide as his sponsor. Waltrip won nine races in his first three seasons with Hendrick, including the 1989 Daytona 500, his sole Daytona 500 victory. The other major highlight of the No. 17 car in 1989 was at The Winston, when Waltrip was spun out by Rusty Wallace before the final lap.

While practicing for his 500th career start at the Daytona summer race, Waltrip's car spun in oil laid down by another car experiencing engine failure and was hit by Dave Marcis. Waltrip suffered a broken arm, a broken leg, and a concussion. He missed the race, but came back to run one lap at Pocono, before giving way to Jimmy Horton as a relief driver. After Pocono, Waltrip sat out the next five races due to his injuries. Despite missing six races, Waltrip finished 20th in driver points and the team finished 5th in owner points with substitute drivers taking turns in the car – Greg Sacks' second-place finish at Michigan, in August, was the best finish of the team's season. The team scored only one DNF for the season, when Sarel van der Merwe crashed late in the race at Watkins Glen. However, in the 23 races that Waltrip did start, he failed to win for the first time since 1974. At the end of the 1990 season, Waltrip decided he wanted to start a new team, so he left Hendrick Motorsports, taking the No. 17 with him. The Tide sponsorship moved to the flagship No. 5 team with Ricky Rudd as the driver and remained there until the end of the 1993 season.

==== Car No. 17 results ====
Year	Driver	No.	Make	1	2	3	4	5	6	7	8	9	10	11	12	13	14	15	16	17	18	19	20	21	22	23	24	25	26	27	28	29	Owners	Pts
1987	Darrell Waltrip	17	Chevy	DAY; 8	CAR; 7	RCH; 20	ATL; 6	DAR; 10	NWS; 21	BRI; 12	MAR; 21	TAL; 11	CLT; 5	DOV; 7	POC; 13	RSD; 30	MCH; 7	DAY; 4	POC; 19	TAL; 4	GLN; 11	MCH; 17	BRI; 21	DAR; 10	RCH; 2	DOV; 10	MAR; 1	NWS; 12	CLT; 9	CAR; 3	RSD; 6	ATL; 18	4th	3911
1988	Darrell Waltrip	17	Chevy	DAY; 11	RCH; 4	CAR; 24	ATL; 3	DAR; 24	BRI; 23	NWS; 14	MAR; 5	TAL; 37	CLT; 1	DOV; 23	RSD; 28	POC; 6	MCH; 8	DAY; 5	POC; 5	TAL; 33*	GLN; 20	MCH; 17	BRI; 7	DAR; 4	RCH; 8	DOV; 17	MAR; 1	CLT; 2	NWS; 12	CAR; 31	PHO; 13	ATL; 5	6th	3764
1989	Darrell Waltrip	17	Chevy	DAY; 1	CAR; 29	ATL; 1	RCH; 7	DAR; 36	BRI; 2	NWS; 8	MAR; 1*	TAL; 5	CLT; 1	DOV; 9	SON; 38	POC; 32	MCH; 3	DAY; 19	POC; 4	TAL; 2	GLN; 16	MCH; 37	BRI; 1*	DAR; 22	RCH; 6	DOV; 18	MAR; 1	CLT; 14	NWS; 20	CAR; 3	PHO; 4	ATL; 5	4th	3971
1990	Darrell Waltrip	17	Chevy	DAY; 14	RCH; 12	CAR; 6	ATL; 26	DAR; 11	BRI; 9*	NWS; 2	MAR; 4	TAL; 10	CLT; 22	DOV; 19	SON; 33	POC; 8	MCH; 15	DAY; INQ^{†}	POC; 20						RCH; 3	DOV; 19	MAR; 19	NWS; 7	CLT; 9	CAR; 8	PHO; 4	ATL; 5	5th	3691
1990	Jimmy Horton	17	Chevy															DAY; 17		TAL; 13													5th	3691
1990	Sarel van der Merwe	17	Chevy																		GLN; 24												5th	3691
1990	Greg Sacks	17	Chevy																			MCH; 2	BRI; 20	DAR; 30									5th	3691

=== Car No. 25 history ===
Tim Richmond (1986–1987)

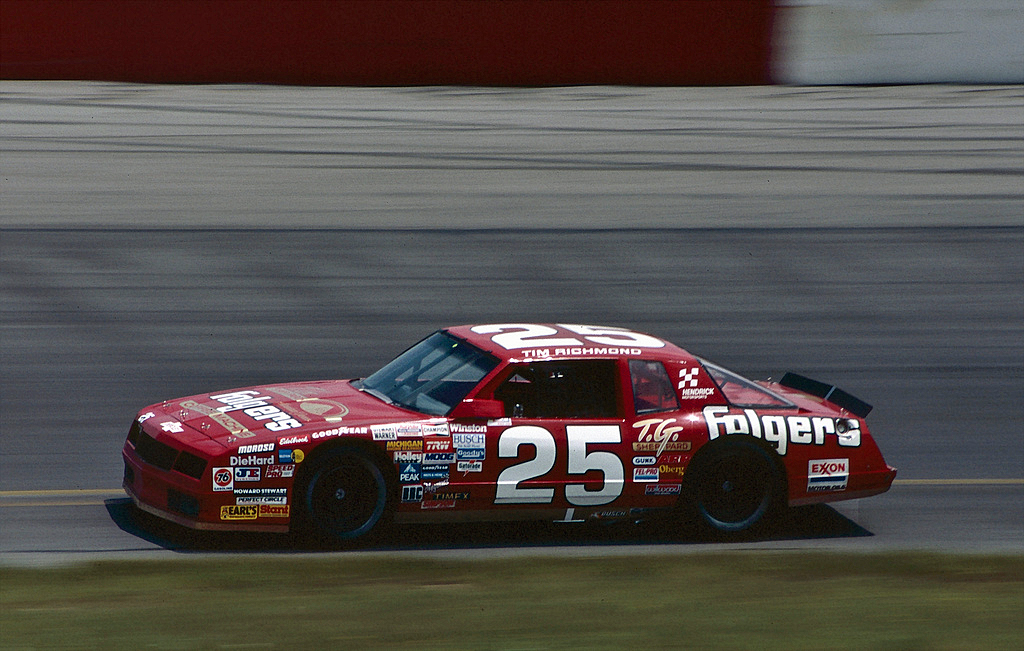
Tim Richmond's No. 25 Folgers-sponsored Chevrolet

Car No. 25 was owned for many years by Rick Hendrick's father, Joe "Papa" Hendrick. It debuted in 1986 as HMS's second team, with a Folgers sponsorship and Tim Richmond driving. Richmond was teamed with veteran crew chief Harry Hyde, who moved over from the No. 5 team after chemistry issues with Geoff Bodine. Richmond won seven times that year and finished third in points. He missed the beginning of the 1987 season due to HIV/AIDS, while publicly saying he was suffering from pneumonia. Benny Parsons drove the first eleven races of the season, with the car renumbered 35; Darrell Waltrip was hired to drive Hendrick's third car at this time. Richmond returned midway through the season and won his first two races, at Pocono and Riverside. Following a blown engine at Michigan and deteriorating health, he left the ride after only eight starts. He died in August 1989. Despite two seasons with HMS, Richmond's 9 race victories was the most for the team from 1987 until 1996 (Darrell Waltrip shared the team record of 9 race victories with Richmond from 1989 to 1996).

Ken Schrader (1988–1996)

In 1988, Ken Schrader took over the ride, winning the pole at the season opening Daytona 500. He won two pole positions, won the Talladega DieHard 500, and finished fifth in points. He won four more poles in 1989 and picked up a victory in the fall race at Charlotte. Kodiak replaced Folgers as the sponsor of the No. 25 for the 1990 season. Schrader failed to win a race in 1990, but he won the Daytona 500 pole for the third year in a row. He won two more races in 1991 and finished ninth in points. Schrader did not win again, but he finished a career-best fourth in points in 1994. After that year, Budweiser replaced Kodiak as the sponsor. Schrader left the team after the 1996 season and was replaced by Ricky Craven. Schrader's nine years with HMS was the longest tenure in the team's history until Jeff Gordon surpassed it in 2002 with his then 10th season with the team.

Ricky Craven (1997–1998)

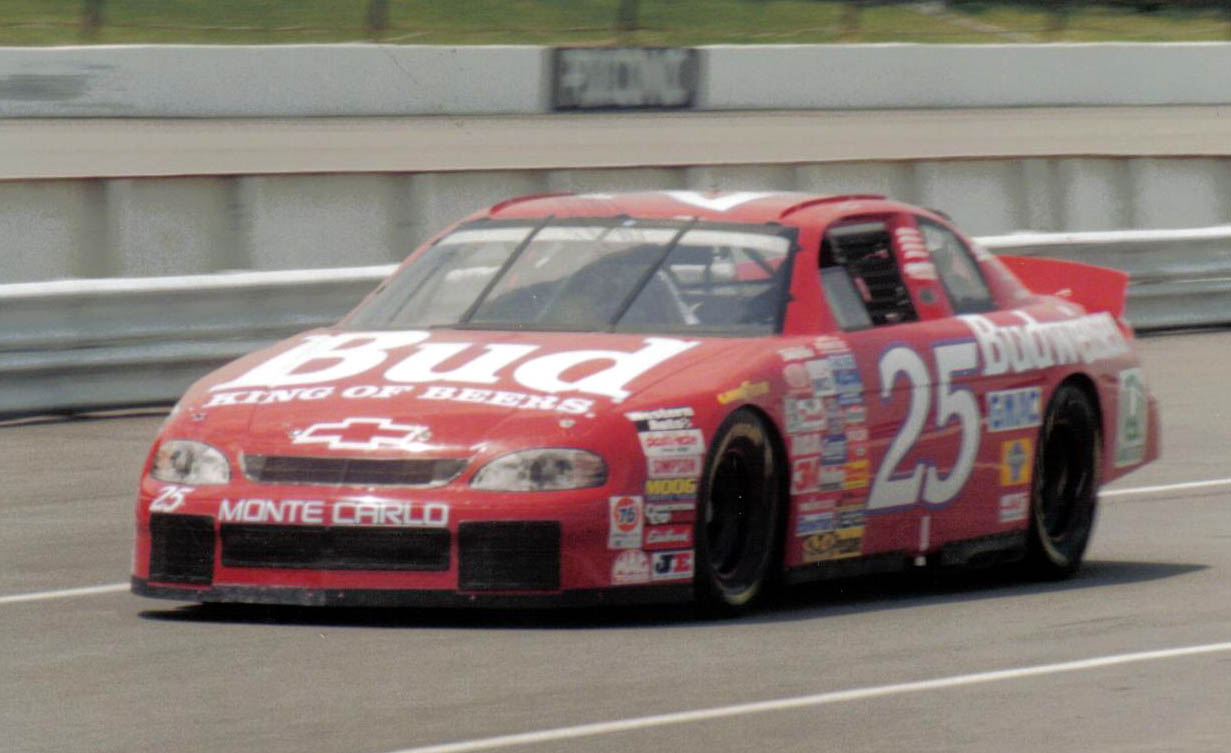
Ricky Craven's No. 25 Budweiser-sponsored Chevrolet in 1997

Craven helped Hendrick complete a 1–2–3 finish in the 1997 Daytona 500 by finishing third behind winner Jeff Gordon and second-place Terry Labonte. After suffering a concussion at Texas, he missed two races. Jack Sprague and Todd Bodine filled in for him during the injury. The other highlight for Craven during the 1997 campaign was a Winston Open win. Craven ultimately finished nineteenth in points.

Multiple Drivers and the no. 50 (1998)

In 1998, to honor NASCAR's fiftieth anniversary, the No. 25 car changed its number to 50 for the season. Shortly after the season started Craven, still feeling the effects from his concussion the year before, was diagnosed with post-concussion syndrome. Randy LaJoie and Wally Dallenbach Jr. filled in while Craven recovered. Craven returned to driving at his home track, New Hampshire, and won the pole for the event, but after four more races Hendrick permanently replaced Craven with Dallenbach, who had put together the stronger run of the two substitute drivers.

Wally Dallenbach Jr. (1999)

With the team back to racing the No. 25 with Dallenbach behind the wheel, the team raced to an eighteenth-place finish in points 1999. However, Dallenbach left the team to drive for a new team and Budweiser moved over to sponsor Dale Earnhardt, Inc.'s No. 8 car in 2000 and the team needed to hire a replacement and find a sponsor. Homebuilder and television personality Michael Holigan came on to sponsor the car for 2000 and Hendrick hired driver Jerry Nadeau. Nadeau had most recently been driving for MB2 Motorsports as a replacement for a retired Ernie Irvan, who – due to injuries – was pulled out of NASCAR midway through 1999.

Jerry Nadeau (2000–2002)

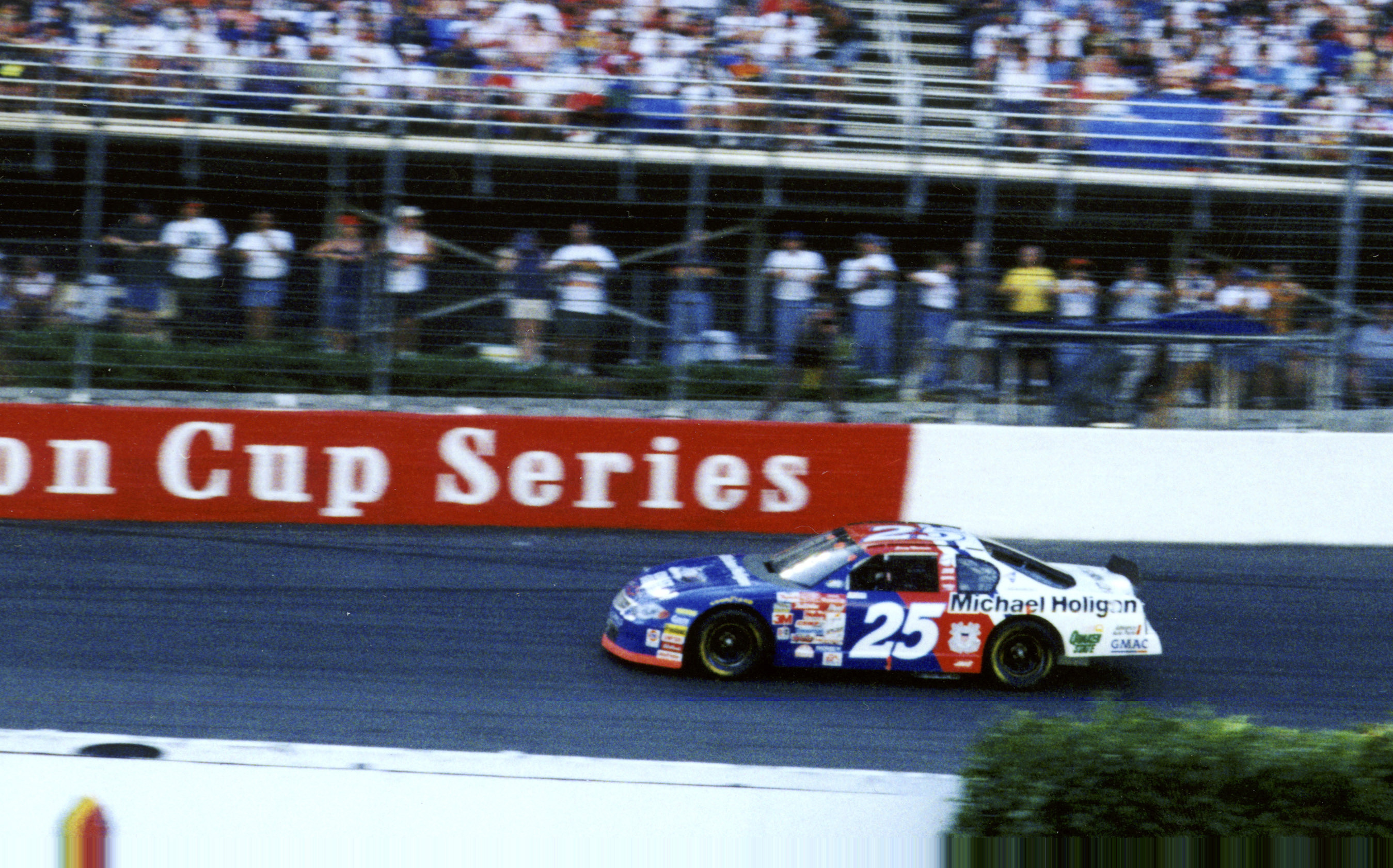
Jerry Nadeau's Michael Holigan-sponsored Chevrolet in 2000

Nadeau had a solid first year with Hendrick, finishing twentieth in points and winning the season-ending race at Atlanta. The team returned for 2001 with UAW and Delphi as co-sponsors, and Nadeau finished a career high seventeenth in points while nearly repeating his Atlanta victory; Nadeau ran out of gas short of the finish and finished fifth. After eleven races in 2002, Nadeau was let go from the team.

Joe Nemechek (2002–2003)

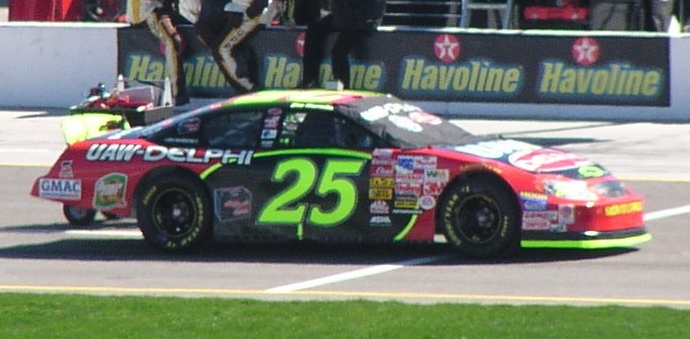
Joe Nemechek's UAW/Delphi-sponsored Chevrolet in 2003

Nadeau's replacement was Joe Nemechek, who had been released from Haas-Carter Motorsports after his team lost its sponsor Kmart due to bankruptcy and had spent much of the early part of the season substituting for an injured Johnny Benson Jr. in the No. 10 car at MB2. Nemechek won at Richmond in 2003 but was let go before the end of the season so he could join MB2 Motorsports as the replacement for an injured Nadeau.

Brian Vickers (2003–2006)

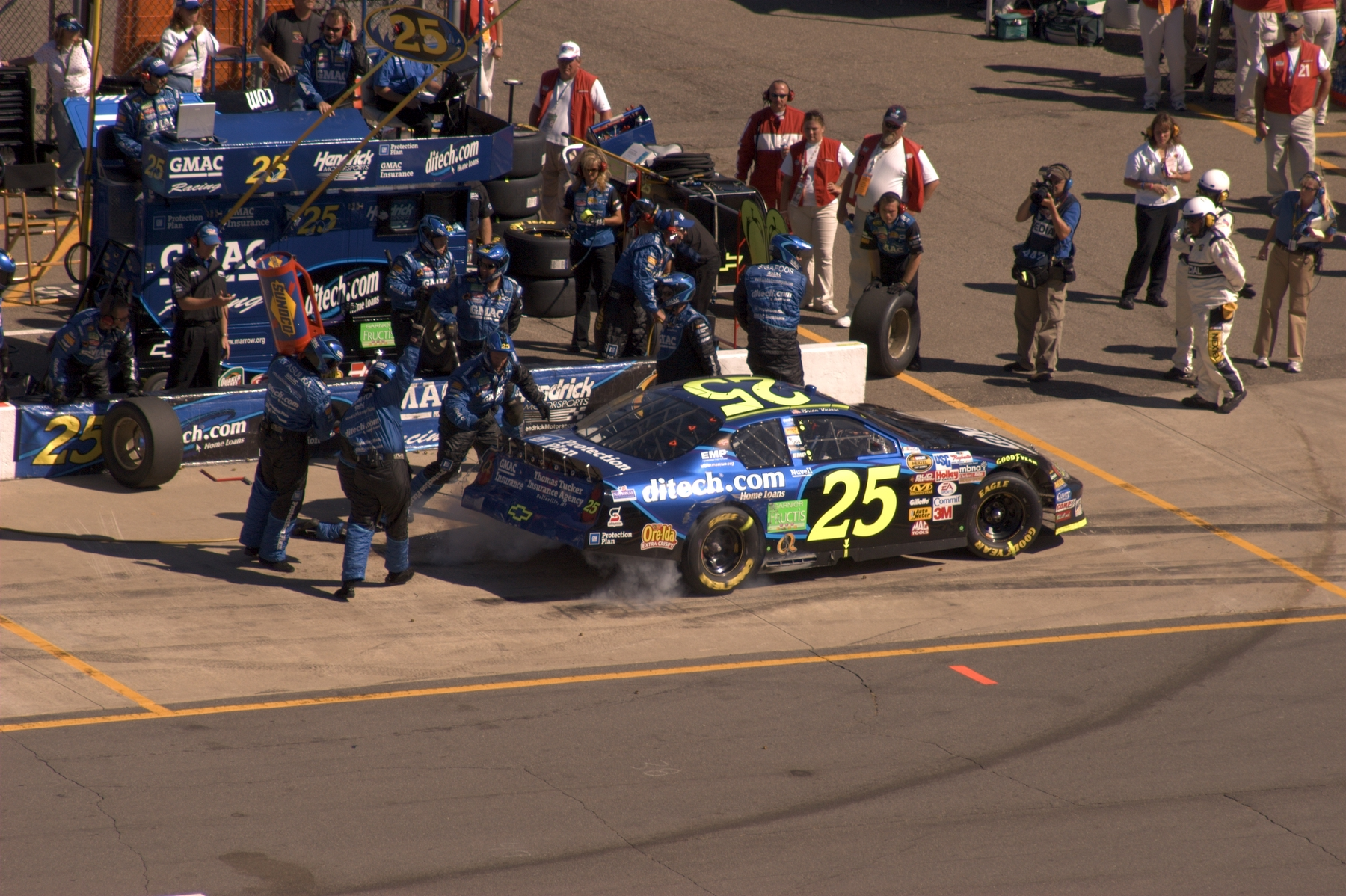
Brian Vickers' GMAC/Ditech-sponsored Chevrolet in 2005

Nemechek's replacement in the No. 25 was Brian Vickers, who was initially supposed to drive the car beginning in 2004 while racing full-time in the Busch Series in 2003 (where he won the championship). UAW and Delphi did not return as sponsors after 2003, so Hendrick replaced them with GMAC Financial (Vickers' primary sponsor in Busch) and sister company Ditech.com. Despite high expectations, Vickers finished third in Rookie of the Year standings behind Kasey Kahne and Brendan Gaughan. 2004 was a sad year for Vickers and the No. 25 team. "Papa" Joe, long-time owner of the No. 25 car, died in July, while Vickers' close friend Ricky Hendrick (the more recent owner of the 25) perished in a plane crash that also took the lives of nine others in October. Vickers improved to seventeenth in points in 2005. Midway through the 2006 campaign, Vickers announced he would leave Hendrick Motorsports at the end of the season.

Casey Mears (2007)

On June 9, 2006, Hendrick Motorsports announced that Casey Mears of Chip Ganassi Racing would take the spot of Vickers in 2007. Vickers collected his first career win later that season at Talladega in a controversial finish, spinning out teammate Jimmie Johnson and Dale Earnhardt Jr. to take the victory.

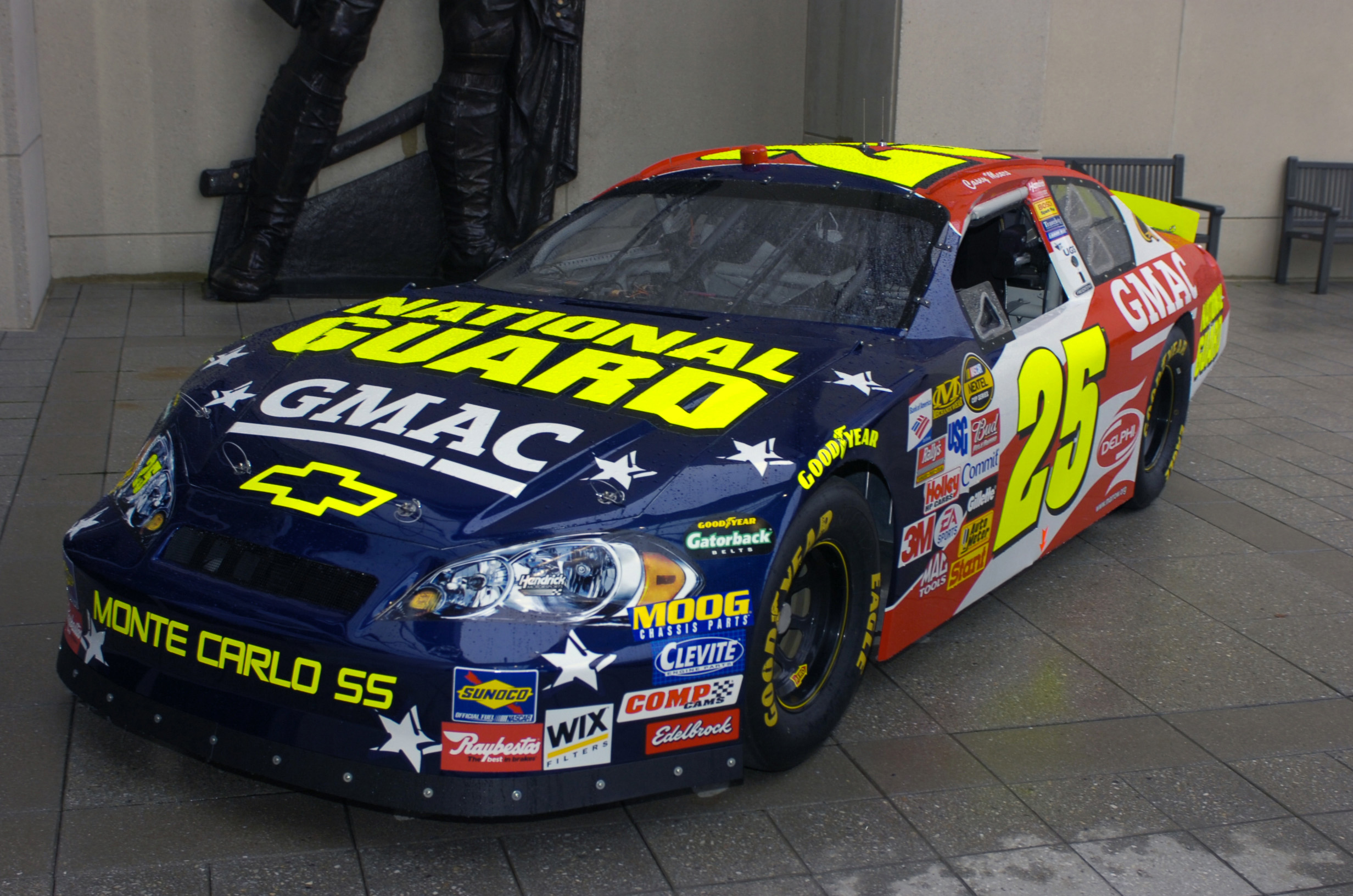
Casey Mears' No. 25 National Guard/GMAC Chevrolet in 2007

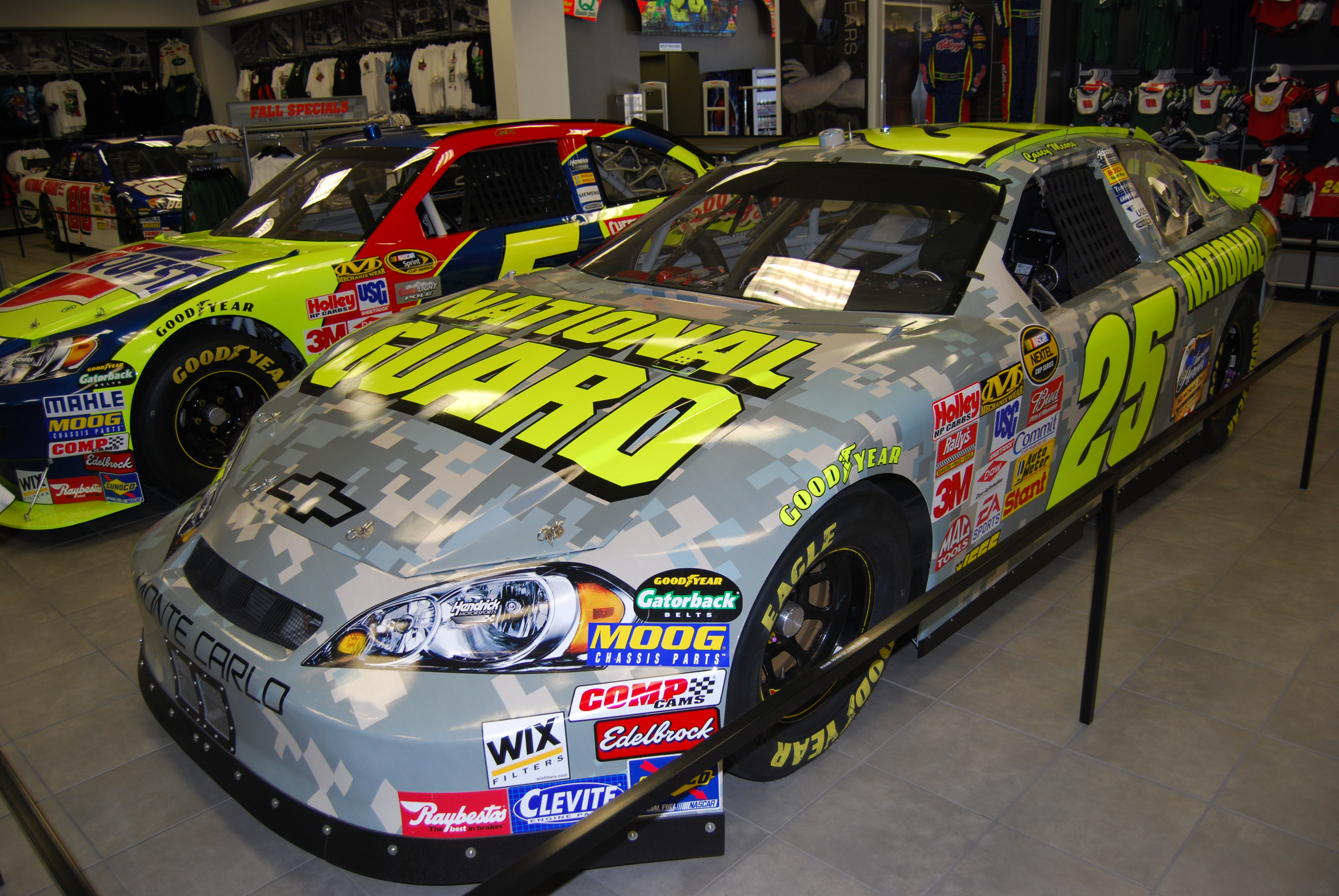
Casey Mears' No. 25 National Guard Chevrolet in 2007 after its victory at Charlotte

In 2007, the National Guard joined forces with longtime Hendrick Motorsports partner GMAC to sponsor the No. 25 Chevrolet driven by Casey Mears. Mears piloted the No. 25 to his first career win at Charlotte in the Coca-Cola 600. After the season, Mears moved to the No. 5, while the fourth full-time ride was given to the new No. 88 for Dale Earnhardt Jr., who replaced Kyle Busch at Hendrick Motorsports. This left the No. 25 as a part-time team.

Part-time (2008–2015)

Making his Cup Series debut at Texas in the 2008 Dickies 500, JR Motorsports driver Brad Keselowski started 37th and finished 19th in the No. 25 GoDaddy-sponsored Chevrolet. Keselowski would go on to make limited appearances in the No. 25 in both 2008 and 2009 with the intent of eventually taking over the team's No. 5 car. However, after Mark Martin re-signed to continue driving the No. 5 car in 2010, Keselowski replaced David Stremme in the No. 12 car for Penske Racing late in the 2009 season (the ride he had been offered at the beginning of the season), leaving the Hendrick organization.

The No. 25 returned in 2011, being driven by Mark Martin in that year's Sprint All-Star Race while his usual No. 5 was being occupied by Jimmie Johnson. The Farmers Insurance Group-sponsored car sported a retro red paint scheme resembling the Budweiser and Folgers schemes run by the team in the 1980s and 1990s.

In late 2014, it was announced that Nationwide Series Champion Chase Elliott would drive several races in a fifth Hendrick car in 2015, according to Hendrick Motorsports general manager Doug Duchardt. The car was officially announced as the No. 25 on January 29, 2015, and Elliott drove the car in five races with Xfinity Series sponsor NAPA Auto Parts, preparing to take over the No. 24 car in 2016. In those 5 races, Elliott had an average finish of 26.2 with a best finish of 16th at Richmond.

==== Car No. 25 results ====
Year	Driver	No.	Make	1	2	3	4	5	6	7	8	9	10	11	12	13	14	15	16	17	18	19	20	21	22	23	24	25	26	27	28	29	30	31	32	33	34	35	36	Owners	Pts
1986	Tim Richmond	25	Chevy	DAY; 20	RCH; 22	CAR; 16	ATL; 7	BRI; 8	DAR; 5	NWS; 12	MAR; 20	TAL; 12	DOV; 32	CLT; 2	RSD; 2*	POC; 1*	MCH; 15	DAY; 1	POC; 1	TAL; 2	GLN; 1	MCH; 2	BRI; 6	DAR; 1*	RCH; 1	DOV; 26	MAR; 10	NWS; 11	CLT; 27*	CAR; 20	ATL; 4	RSD; 1								3rd	4147
1987	Tim Richmond	25	Chevy	DAY	CAR	RCH	ATL	DAR	NWS	BRI	MAR	TAL	CLT	DOV	POC; 1*	RSD; 1	MCH; 4	DAY; 22	POC; 29	TAL; 11	GLN; 10	MCH; 29	BRI	DAR	RCH	DOV	MAR	NWS	CLT	CAR										36th	1063
1987	Rick Hendrick	25	Chevy																												RSD; 33	ATL								36th	1063
1988	Ken Schrader	25	Chevy	DAY; 6	RCH; DNQ	CAR; 10	ATL; 8	DAR; 29	BRI; 10	NWS; 11	MAR; 10	TAL; 5	CLT; 6	DOV; 21	RSD; 20	POC; 9	MCH; 6	DAY; 8	POC; 2	TAL; 1	GLN; 10	MCH; 12	BRI; 21	DAR; 11	RCH; 18	DOV; 35	MAR; 4	CLT; 7	NWS; 8	CAR; 11	PHO; 14	ATL; 6								7th	3755
1989	Ken Schrader	25	Chevy	DAY; 2*	CAR; 25	ATL; 15	RCH; 19	DAR; 27	BRI; 32	NWS; 14	MAR; 7	TAL; 6	CLT; 3	DOV; 3	SON; 37	POC; 4	MCH; 11	DAY; 36	POC; 7	TAL; 4	GLN; 20	MCH; 11	BRI; 23	DAR; 5	RCH; 24	DOV; 3	MAR; 10	CLT; 1	NWS; 13	CAR; 4	PHO; 13	ATL; 4								5th	3876
1990	Ken Schrader	25	Chevy	DAY; 40	RCH; 10	CAR; 3	ATL; 4	DAR; 10	BRI; 6	NWS; 19	MAR; 6	TAL; 28	CLT; 11	DOV; 2	SON; 18	POC; 15	MCH; 27	DAY; 3	POC; 11	TAL; 16	GLN; 9	MCH; 40	BRI; 12	DAR; 39	RCH; 10	DOV; 10	MAR; 27	NWS; 5	CLT; 35	CAR; 5	PHO; 2	ATL; 11								11th	3572
1991	Ken Schrader	25	Chevy	DAY; 31	RCH; 10	CAR; 2	ATL; 1	DAR; 19	BRI; 29	NWS; 5	MAR; 23	TAL; 7	CLT; 2	DOV; 1	SON; 5	POC; 7	MCH; 6	DAY; 4	POC; 23	TAL; 40	GLN; 30	MCH; 10	BRI; 3	DAR; 3	RCH; 8	DOV; 33	MAR; 9	NWS; 8	CLT; 38	CAR; 5	PHO; 17	ATL; 37								9th	3690
1992	Ken Schrader	25	Chevy	DAY; 37	CAR; 5	RCH; 14	ATL; 41	DAR; 12	BRI; 3	NWS; 22	MAR; 7	TAL; 23	CLT; 26	DOV; 23	SON; 9	POC; 4	MCH; 13	DAY; 6	POC; 12	TAL; 9	GLN; 21	MCH; 11	BRI; 3	DAR; 13	RCH; 9	DOV; 30	MAR; 13	NWS; 23	CLT; 7	CAR; 32	PHO; 6	ATL; 36								17th	3404
1993	Ken Schrader	25	Chevy	DAY; 8	CAR; 24	RCH; 20	ATL; 29	DAR; 4	BRI; 34	NWS; 3	MAR; 18	TAL; 21	SON; 4	CLT; 4	DOV; 5	POC; 2	MCH; 16	DAY; 3	NHA; 38	POC; 6	TAL; 32	GLN; 5	MCH; 27	BRI; 24	DAR; 9	RCH; 12	DOV; 2	MAR; 13	NWS; 10	CLT; 9	CAR; 8	PHO; 33	ATL; 27							9th	3715
1994	Ken Schrader	25	Chevy	DAY; 10	CAR; 9	RCH; 11	ATL; 16	DAR; 7	BRI; 2	NWS; 9	MAR; 31	TAL; 5	SON; 9	CLT; 24	DOV; 3	POC; 3	MCH; 6	DAY; 5	NHA; 24	POC; 39	TAL; 4	IND; 7	GLN; 4	MCH; 11	BRI; 19	DAR; 32*	RCH; 9	DOV; 4	MAR; 6	NWS; 14	CLT; 4	CAR; 32	PHO; 15	ATL; 11						5th	4060
1995	Ken Schrader	25	Chevy	DAY; 9	CAR; 39	RCH; 4	ATL; 27	DAR; 11	BRI; 26	NWS; 12	MAR; 6	TAL; 40	SON; 9	CLT; 30*	DOV; 11	POC; 3	MCH; 27	DAY; 6	NHA; 10	POC; 40	TAL; 32	IND; 19	GLN; 36	MCH; 26	BRI; 14	DAR; 23	RCH; 9	DOV; 12	MAR; 32	NWS; 8	CLT; 35	CAR; 33	PHO; 10	ATL; 42						17th	3221
1996	Ken Schrader	25	Chevy	DAY; 3	CAR; 29	RCH; 14	ATL; 6	DAR; 28	BRI; 29	NWS; 9	MAR; 7	TAL; 20	SON; 8	CLT; 5	DOV; 10	POC; 18	MCH; 16	DAY; 8	NHA; 8	POC; 15	TAL; 26	IND; 16	GLN; 25	MCH; 15	BRI; 13	DAR; 4	RCH; 13	DOV; 22	MAR; 30	NWS; 18	CLT; 29	CAR; 23	PHO; 35	ATL; 30						12th	3540
1997	Ricky Craven	25	Chevy	DAY; 3	CAR; 5	RCH; 14	ATL; 35	DAR; 40			MAR; 22	SON; 39	TAL; 27	CLT; 37	DOV; 13	POC; 16	MCH; 18	CAL; 9	DAY; 37	NHA; 16	POC; 18	IND; 16	GLN; 17	MCH; 12	BRI; 13	DAR; 31	RCH; 18	NHA; 5	DOV; 41	MAR; 8	CLT; 25	TAL; 6	CAR; 3*	PHO; 43	ATL; 39					18th	3244
1997	Todd Bodine	25	Chevy						TEX; 25																															18th	3244
1997	Jack Sprague	25	Chevy							BRI; 40																														18th	3244
1998	Ricky Craven	50	Chevy	DAY; 14	CAR; 10	LVS; 27	ATL; 34													NHA; 29	POC; 41	IND; 17	GLN; 35																	27th	2814
1998	Randy LaJoie	50	Chevy					DAR; 38	BRI; 10	TEX; 25	MAR; 5	TAL; 10	CAL; 36	CLT; 38	DOV; 43	RCH; 31																								27th	2814
1998	Wally Dallenbach Jr.	50	Chevy														MCH; 10	POC; 7	SON; 27					MCH; 8	BRI; 28	NHA; 43	DAR; 31	RCH; 30	DOV; 25	MAR; 32	CLT; 23	TAL; 39	DAY; 30	PHO; 25	CAR; 36	ATL; 25				27th	2814
1999	Wally Dallenbach Jr.	25	Chevy	DAY; 12	CAR; 17	LVS; 13	ATL; 39	DAR; 38	TEX; 23	BRI; 30	MAR; 18	TAL; 20	CAL; 8	RCH; 20	CLT; 21	DOV; 20	MCH; 14	POC; 39	SON; 41	DAY; 26	NHA; 7	POC; 5	IND; 14	GLN; 7	MCH; 23	BRI; 28	DAR; 21	RCH; 28	NHA; 22	DOV; 15	MAR; 22	CLT; 33	TAL; 35	CAR; 39	PHO; 9	HOM; 9	ATL; 23			18th	3367
2000	Jerry Nadeau	25	Chevy	DAY; 35	CAR; 29	LVS; 20	ATL; 42	DAR; 37	BRI; 19	TEX; 43	MAR; 20	TAL; 19	CAL; 13	RCH; 30	CLT; 38	DOV; 42	MCH; 23	POC; 20	SON; 8	DAY; 15	NHA; 4	POC; 27	IND; 4	GLN; 38	MCH; 12	BRI; 32	DAR; 29	RCH; 10	NHA; 21	DOV; 33	MAR; 12	CLT; 36	TAL; 13	CAR; 27	PHO; 23	HOM; 12	ATL; 1*			22nd	3273
2001	Jerry Nadeau	25	Chevy	DAY; 32	CAR; 15	LVS; 15	ATL; 3	DAR; 20	BRI; 30	TEX; 29	MAR; 10	TAL; 25	CAL; 8	RCH; 41	CLT; 13	DOV; 38	MCH; 28	POC; 19	SON; 31	DAY; 6	CHI; 37	NHA; 33	POC; 24	IND; 38	GLN; 6	MCH; 34	BRI; 20	DAR; 9	RCH; 14	DOV; 2	KAN; 12	CLT; 40	MAR; 24	TAL; 35	PHO; 24	CAR; 5	HOM; 33	ATL; 4	NHA; 6	18th	3675
2002	Jerry Nadeau	25	Chevy	DAY; 28	CAR; 25	LVS; 15	ATL; 30	DAR; 18	BRI; 8	TEX; 32	MAR; 39	TAL; 32	CAL; 26	RCH; 41																										34th	2946
2002	Joe Nemechek	25	Chevy												CLT; 30	DOV; 43	POC; 41	MCH; 29	SON; 18	DAY; 36	CHI; 33	NHA; 41	POC; 24	IND; 20	GLN; 38	MCH; 35	BRI; 27	DAR; 21	RCH; 25	NHA; 32	DOV; 23	KAN; 4	TAL; 39	CLT; 40	MAR; 41	ATL; 2	CAR; 28	PHO; 33	HOM; 2*	34th	2946
2003	Joe Nemechek	25	Chevy	DAY; 22	CAR; 23	LVS; 9	ATL; 9	DAR; 13	BRI; 27	TEX; 35	TAL; 21	MAR; 15	CAL; 32	RCH; 1*	CLT; 11	DOV; 24	POC; 38	MCH; 21	SON; 35	DAY; 38	CHI; 42	NHA; 29	POC; 7	IND; 37	GLN; 17	MCH; 20	BRI; 19	DAR; 21	RCH; 26	NHA; 3	DOV; 43	TAL; 25	KAN; 37	CLT; 31	MAR; 20					27th	3334
2003	Brian Vickers	25	Chevy																																	ATL; 43	PHO; 13	CAR; 24	HOM; 34	27th	3334
2004	Brian Vickers	25	Chevy	DAY; 39	CAR; 16	LVS; 23	ATL; 21	DAR; 23	BRI; 35	TEX; 12	MAR; 13	TAL; 27	CAL; 29	RCH; 8	CLT; 15	DOV; 23	POC; 13	MCH; 9	SON; 22	DAY; 9	CHI; 14	NHA; 34	POC; 14	IND; 29	GLN; 30	MCH; 22	BRI; 20	CAL; 13	RCH; 37	NHA; 22	DOV; 38	TAL; 36	KAN; 19	CLT; 40	MAR; 27	ATL; 7	PHO; 18	DAR; 21	HOM; 18	26th	3521
2005	Brian Vickers	25	Chevy	DAY; 21	CAL; 21	LVS; 43	ATL; 6	BRI; 12	MAR; 35	TEX; 34	PHO; 5	TAL; 37	DAR; 16	RCH; 32	CLT; 31*	DOV; 6	POC; 2*	MCH; 41	SON; 34	DAY; 29	CHI; 4	NHA; 11	POC; 14	IND; 3	GLN; 8	MCH; 9	BRI; 20	CAL; 3	RCH; 37	NHA; 13	DOV; 14	TAL; 6	KAN; 11	CLT; 12	MAR; 36	ATL; 15	TEX; 19	PHO; 26	HOM; 43	17th	3847
2006	Brian Vickers	25	Chevy	DAY; 7	CAL; 18	LVS; 22	ATL; 23	BRI; 37	MAR; 8	TEX; 43	PHO; 13	TAL; 3	RCH; 37	DAR; 41	CLT; 37	DOV; 23	POC; 4	MCH; 17	SON; 14	DAY; 18	CHI; 13	NHA; 17	POC; 4	IND; 17	GLN; 16	MCH; 15	BRI; 33	CAL; 41	RCH; 24	NHA; 5	DOV; 29	KAN; 8	TAL; 1	CLT; 10	MAR; 17	ATL; 19	TEX; 27	PHO; 11	HOM; 21	15th	3906
2007	Casey Mears	25	Chevy	DAY; 20	CAL; 31	LVS; 40	ATL; 28	BRI; 10	MAR; 42	TEX; 23	PHO; 37	TAL; 39	RCH; 18	DAR; 35	CLT; 1	DOV; 13	POC; 4	MCH; 4	SON; 27	NHA; 23	DAY; 19	CHI; 5	IND; 35	POC; 10	GLN; 15	MCH; 11	BRI; 22	CAL; 15	RCH; 17	NHA; 8	DOV; 6	KAN; 4	TAL; 6	CLT; 21	MAR; 20	ATL; 12	TEX; 31	PHO; 13	HOM; 16	15th	3949
2008	Brad Keselowski	25	Chevy	DAY	CAL	LVS	ATL	BRI	MAR	TEX	PHO	TAL	RCH	DAR	CLT	DOV	POC	MCH	SON	NHA	DAY	CHI	IND	POC	GLN	MCH	BRI	CAL	RCH	NHA	DOV	KAN	TAL	CLT; DNQ	MAR	ATL	TEX; 19	PHO	HOM; 23	49th	225
2009	Brad Keselowski	25	Chevy	DAY	CAL	LVS; 38	ATL	BRI	MAR	TEX; 23	PHO	TAL	RCH	DAR; 7	CLT	DOV; DNQ	POC	MCH	SON	NHA	DAY	CHI; 32	IND	POC	GLN	MCH; 24	BRI	ATL	RCH	NHA	DOV	KAN; 13	CAL	CLT; 12	MAR	TAL	TEX	PHO	HOM	46th	734
2015	Chase Elliott	25	Chevy	DAY	ATL	LVS	PHO	CAL	MAR; 38	TEX	BRI	RCH; 16	TAL	KAN	CLT; 18	DOV	POC	MCH	SON	DAY	KEN	NHA	IND; 18	POC	GLN	MCH	BRI	DAR; 41	RCH	CHI	NHA	DOV	CLT	KAN	TAL	MAR	TEX	PHO	HOM	46th	89

=== Car No. 48 history ===
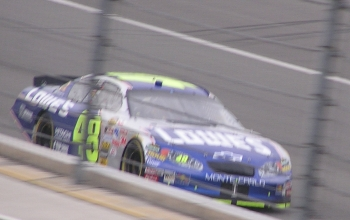
Jimmie Johnson's No. 48 Lowe's Chevrolet at California in 2005

Jimmie Johnson (2001–2020)

Hendrick Motorsports' No. 48 team began Cup Series competition in 2001 when Hendrick signed Jimmie Johnson, a second-year Busch Series driver for Herzog-Jackson Motorsports. The team is co-owned by Hendrick and Jeff Gordon. Johnson made his debut at the fall Charlotte race, qualifying 15th and finishing 39th after crashing out. Johnson competed in two other races that year before moving to the Cup Series full-time in 2002, making Hendrick Motorsports a 4-car operation. The No. 48 team took over old cars from the No. 24 team, which built new cars for the 2002 season. Johnson won three races and finished fifth in points, behind only Ryan Newman among rookies. He won three more races in 2003 and finished second in points.

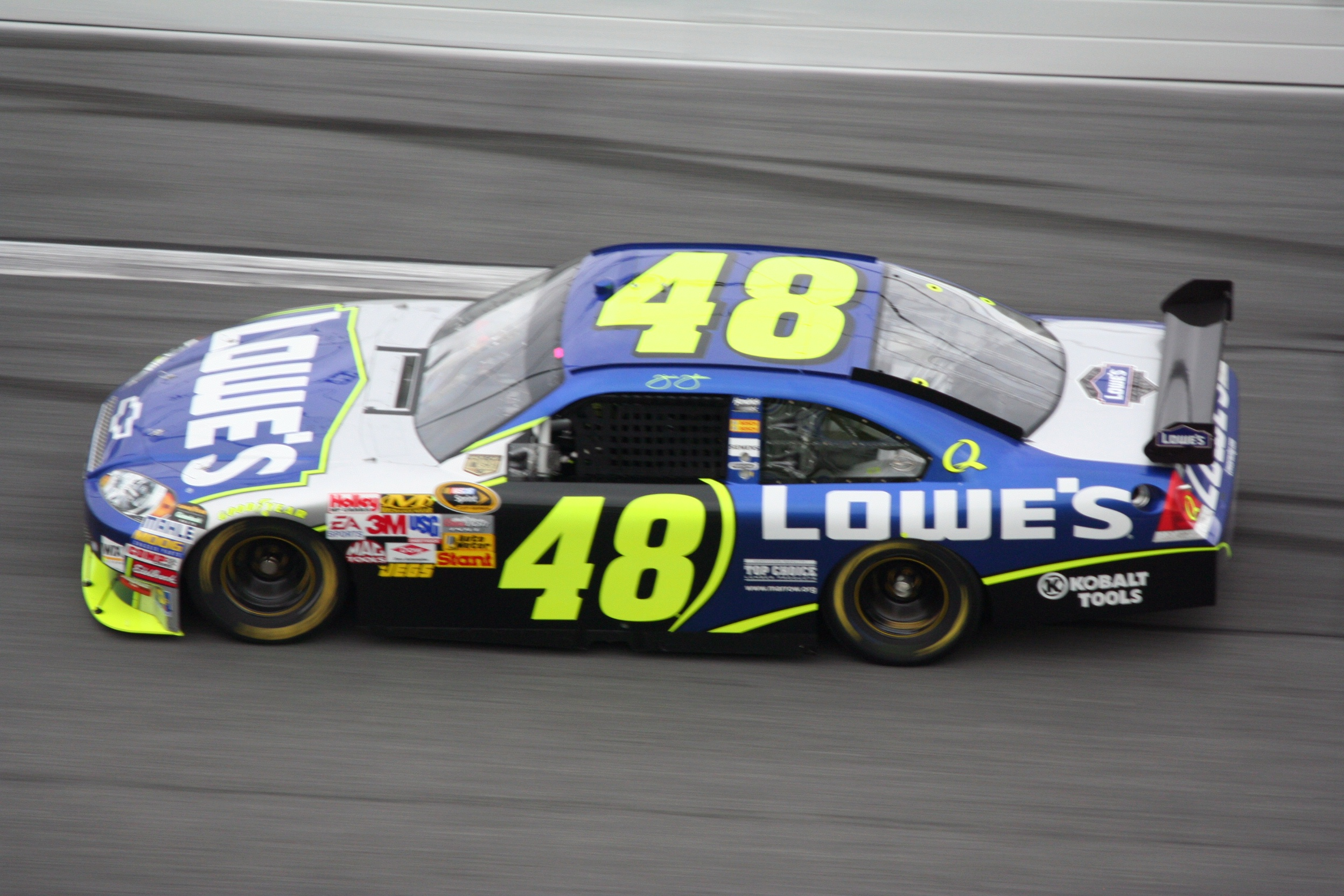
Jimmie Johnson's No. 48 Lowe's Chevrolet in 2008

Johnson led the Cup Series in points for much of the 2004 season, and entered the first Chase for the Nextel Cup second behind Gordon. Johnson won four races during the Chase, but finished in second, just eight points behind Kurt Busch. Johnson again led the Cup Series in points for much of the 2005 season, but lost the points lead after a hard crash at the Brickyard 400, and finished the season fifth in points. Johnson scored his first Daytona 500 victory in 2006, despite crew chief Chad Knaus serving a four-race suspension for rules infractions. Johnson also won the All-Star Challenge, Brickyard 400, and his first Nextel Cup championship in 2006. Johnson won the championship again in 2007, winning 10 races, the most by a driver in a single season since Gordon won 13 in 1998. Hendrick Motorsports won 18 of 36 races in 2007, including four in a row during the Chase.

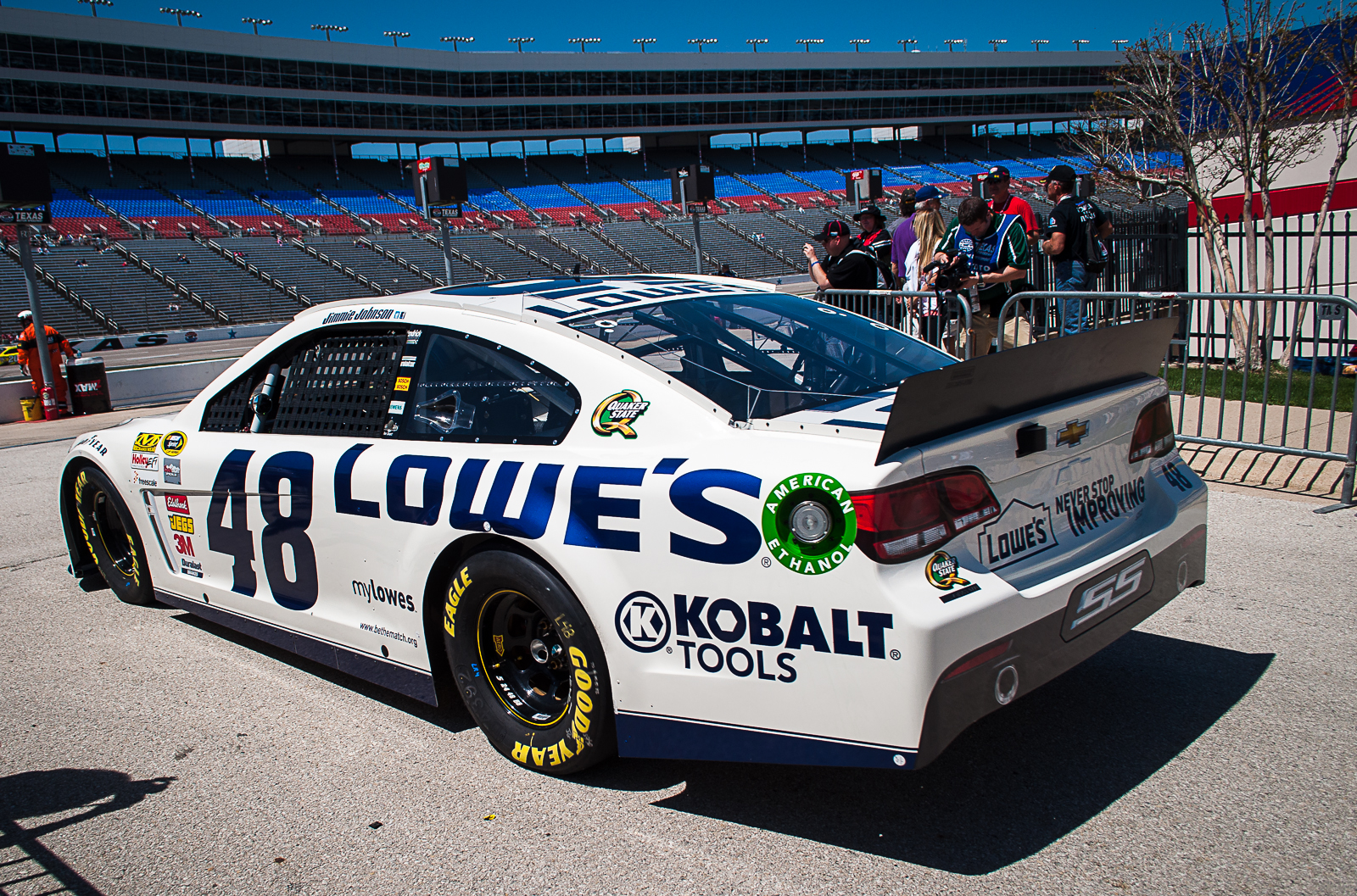
Jimmie Johnson's No. 48 Lowe's Chevrolet at Texas in 2013

Johnson tied Cale Yarborough's record by winning his third consecutive championship in 2008. In 2009, Johnson won seven races, had 16 top fives, and 24 top tens to become the first NASCAR driver to win four consecutive championships. Johnson eclipsed his own record in 2010 with his fifth straight title, finishing second in the final race of the season to pass Denny Hamlin in points.

The 2011 season's most memorable moment occurred at Talladega, when Johnson used a push from teammate Dale Earnhardt Jr. to beat Clint Bowyer by just .002 seconds, the closest finish in Cup Series history. However, Johnson failed to win a sixth consecutive championship, winning only two races, and his sixth-place points finish was the first time he finished outside the top five in his career. The No. 48 team's performance improved in 2012, winning five races, but late-season mishaps at Phoenix and Homestead relegated them to third in points.

In 2013, Johnson won his second Daytona 500 and fourth All-Star Race on his way to a sixth Cup Series championship. Johnson's 11th-place points finish in 2014, however, marked the first time he finished a season outside the top ten. Johnson won five races in 2015, but again struggled during the Chase and finished tenth. In 2016 Johnson won another five races on his way to his record-tying seventh championship in 2016, joining Richard Petty and Dale Earnhardt.

In 2017, Johnson won his final 3 races (Texas, Bristol, and Dover) and made it to the round of 8 but a crash at Phoenix ruined his chance to make the final four. He finished 10th in points

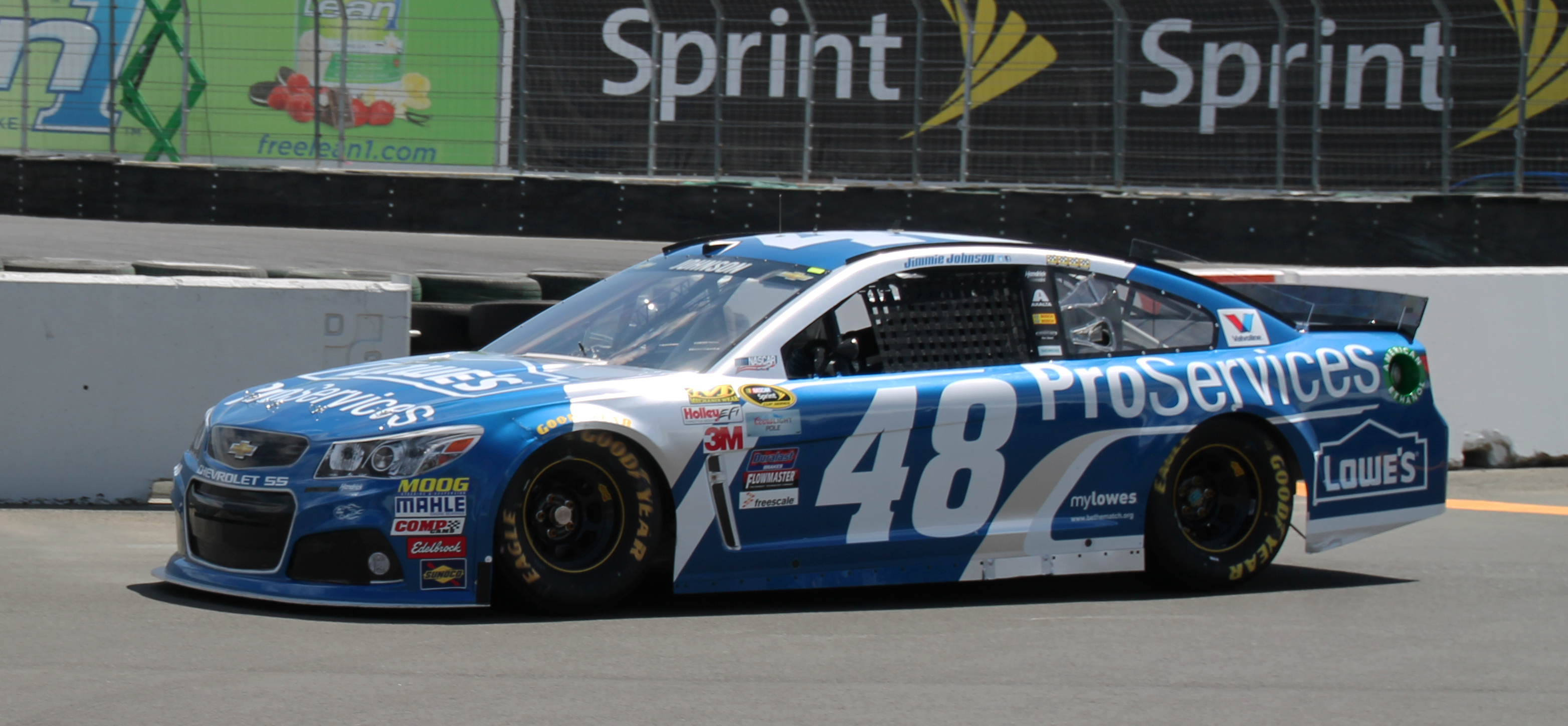
Jimmie Johnson's No. 48 Lowe's Chevrolet at Sonoma in 2015

Johnson made the Playoffs in 2018 despite not winning a race, his 15th straight appearance in NASCAR's postseason. At the inaugural Charlotte Roval race, Johnson nearly overtook Martin Truex Jr. to win, but locked his brakes on the final turn and spun out both drivers. Ryan Blaney won the race, and the six spots Johnson lost as a result of the spin eliminated him from the Playoffs.

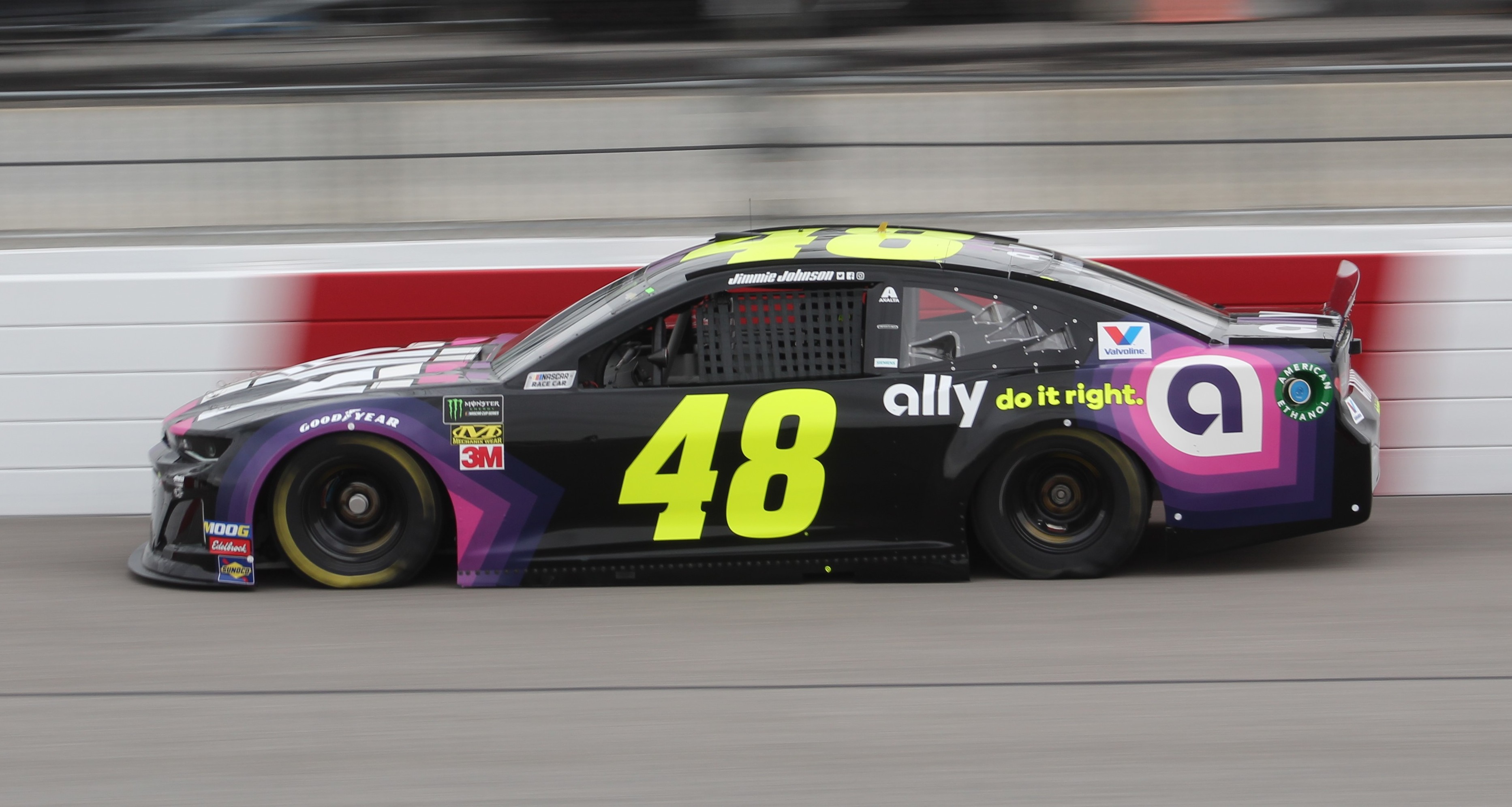
Jimmie Johnson's No. 48 Ally Chevrolet at Richmond in 2019

On March 14, 2018, Lowe's announced they would end their sponsorship of the No. 48 team after the season. To commemorate the longtime partnership, Johnson drove the No. 48 car with its original Lowe's paint scheme in the season-ending race at Homestead. Following the season, Kevin Meendering from JR Motorsports replaced Knaus as crew chief of Johnson's team, with Knaus moving to the No. 24 team in 2019. Ally Financial (formerly GMAC, a past Hendrick Motorsports sponsor) signed a two-year deal to sponsor the No. 48 team starting in 2019.

Midway through 2019, following a string of disappointing finishes, race engineer Cliff Daniels replaced Meendering as crew chief of the No. 48. However, Johnson still failed to make the postseason for the first time since its inception in 2004, after a crash at Indianapolis knocked him out of Playoff contention. After the season, Ally agreed to extend its sponsorship of the No. 48 team through 2023. Johnson finished a career-worst 18th in points, registering only three top-five finishes the entire season. 2020 would mark Johnson's final season as a full-time NASCAR driver. Johnson again failed to make the Chase due inconsistent finishes and missing the 2020 Brickyard 400 due to being diagnosed with COVID-19. In his final NASCAR race at the 2020 Season Finale 500 at Phoenix, Johnson would finish fifth as teammate Chase Elliott won the race and the 2020 NASCAR Cup Championship. As Elliott took a victory lap, Johnson met Elliott to congratulate him. Many considered the moment as the passing of the torch.

The 48 team had a driver-crew chief duo consisting of Jimmie Johnson and Chad Knaus, a former rear tire changer on the pit crew of Jeff Gordon's 24 team. The team also had notable engineers like Charlie Langenstein, who won the Papa Joe Hendrick Award of Excellence in 2009 and was also inducted to the Northeast Modified Hall of Fame.

Alex Bowman (2021–2027)

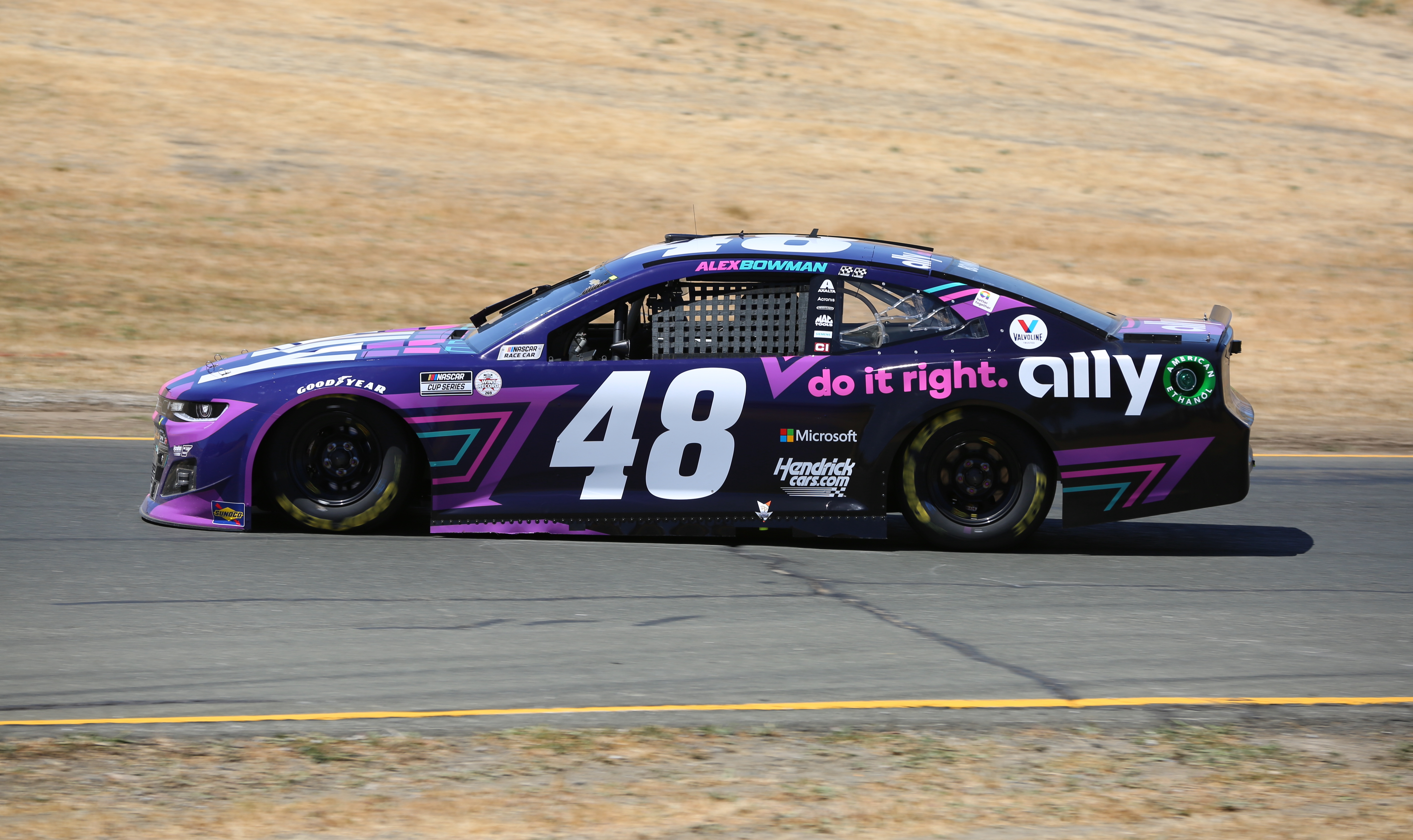
Alex Bowman in the No. 48 at Sonoma in 2021

On October 6, 2020, Hendrick Motorsports announced that Alex Bowman and crew chief Greg Ives would move from the No. 88 to the No. 48 for the 2021 season, as Jimmie's 48 team would move to the 5 team. Bowman scored wins at Richmond (breaking a 139-race winless streak for the No. 48 car, dating back to Dover 2017), Dover (this was also the team's first ever 1-2-3-4 finish), and Pocono to make the playoffs. Following the 2021 Foxwoods Resort Casino 301 at Loudon, the No. 48 was docked 25 points after the car was discovered to be using one of the No. 9 team's engines. During the playoffs, Bowman made it to the Round of 12, but struggled with poor finishes at Las Vegas and Talladega. Following the Charlotte Roval race, he was eliminated from the Round of 12. Despite being eliminated from the playoffs, Bowman secured his fourth win of the season at Martinsville, the final Round of 8 race in 2021.

Bowman started the 2022 season with a 25th place finish at the 2022 Daytona 500. He then scored a win at Las Vegas to make the playoffs. A concussion sustained from his crash at Texas forced him to miss the races at Talladega, Charlotte Roval, Las Vegas, Homestead, and Martinsville, with Noah Gragson filling in the No. 48 for him. Due to his injury, Bowman was eliminated in the Round of 12. Bowman was able to return at Phoenix, finishing 34th.

Bowman began the 2023 season with a fifth place finish at the 2023 Daytona 500. On March 15, the No. 48 was served an L2 penalty after unapproved hood louvers were found installed on the car during pre-race inspection at Phoenix; as a result, the team was docked 100 driver and owner points and 10 playoff points. In addition, Harris was suspended for four races and fined US$100,000. On March 29, the National Motorsports Appeals Panel amended the penalty, upholding the fine and Harris' suspension but restoring the owner, driver, and playoff points. On April 6, the No. 48 was served an L1 penalty after alterations to the car's greenhouse were discovered during post-race inspection following the Richmond race; as a result, the team was docked 60 driver and owner points and five playoff points. In addition, interim crew chief Greg Ives was suspended for two races and fined US$75,000. On April 25, Bowman suffered a back injury from an accident during a sprint car race at West Burlington, Iowa. Josh Berry, who substituted for Chase Elliott earlier in the season, was announced as the relief driver of the No. 48 while Bowman recovers.

Bowman started the 2024 season by finishing second to teammate William Byron at the 2024 Daytona 500. He broke an 80-race drought by winning at the Chicago street race. At the Charlotte Roval, Bowman finished 18th, but was later disqualified after post-race inspection revealed his car did not meet the minimum weight requirement; as a result, he was eliminated prior to the Round of 8.

Bowman started his 2025 campaign with a sixth-place finish at the 2025 Daytona 500. Bowman would get his sixth career pole and almost win the 2025 Straight Talk Wireless 400 until Kyle Larson intimidated Bowman to hit the wall, and Larson would go on to win. Bowman would also get a pole at Bristol in the spring. Later in the season, at Michigan, Bowman would suffer a hard crash from contact with Cole Custer and would get minor pain in his back and body soreness. He would fight back to finish fourth at Mexico City the following week. Bowman would make the playoffs after Ryan Blaney won the final regular season race at Daytona. At Bristol, Bowman was in a must-win situation but got eliminated as he finished eighth.

Bowman came into the 2026 season with his future with the No. 48 team uncertain. During the race at Austin, Bowman had to exit the car at lap 71, in favor of Myatt Snider, due to vertigo symptoms. It was announced that he would miss the following race at Phoenix, as well. Anthony Alfredo would fill in for him. Justin Allgaier would fill in at Las Vegas, Darlington, Martinsville. Bowman returned to the car at Bristol after being medically cleared. On July 23, Bowman announced that he would retire after the 2027 season, following the signing of a one-year contract.

Connor Zilisch (2028)

On August 17, 2026, Hendrick Motorsports announced that Connor Zilisch would drive the No. 48 starting in 2028.

==== Car No. 48 results ====
Year	Driver	No.	Make	1	2	3	4	5	6	7	8	9	10	11	12	13	14	15	16	17	18	19	20	21	22	23	24	25	26	27	28	29	30	31	32	33	34	35	36	Owners	Pts
2001	Jimmie Johnson	48	Chevy	DAY	CAR	LVS	ATL	DAR	BRI	TEX	MAR	TAL	CAL	RCH	CLT	DOV	MCH	POC	SON	DAY	CHI	NHA	POC	IND	GLN	MCH	BRI	DAR	RCH	DOV	KAN	CLT; 39	MAR	TAL	PHO	CAR	HOM; 25	ATL; 29	NHA	52nd	210
2002	Jimmie Johnson	48	Chevy	DAY; 15	CAR; 28	LVS; 6	ATL; 3	DAR; 6	BRI; 7	TEX; 6	MAR; 35	TAL; 7	CAL; 1	RCH; 31	CLT; 7	DOV; 1	POC; 3	MCH; 14	SON; 35	DAY; 8	CHI; 4	NHA; 15	POC; 15	IND; 9	GLN; 16	MCH; 7	BRI; 34	DAR; 9	RCH; 13	NHA; 9	DOV; 1	KAN; 10	TAL; 37	CLT; 6	MAR; 6	ATL; 22	CAR; 37	PHO; 15	HOM; 8	5th	4600
2003	Jimmie Johnson	48	Chevy	DAY; 3	CAR; 8	LVS; 11	ATL; 32	DAR; 27	BRI; 8	TEX; 8	TAL; 15	MAR; 9	CAL; 16	RCH; 19	CLT; 1	DOV; 38	POC; 12	MCH; 16	SON; 17	DAY; 18	CHI; 3	NHA; 1	POC; 15	IND; 18	GLN; 4	MCH; 27	BRI; 5	DAR; 3	RCH; 11	NHA; 1	DOV; 8	TAL; 34	KAN; 7	CLT; 3	MAR; 2	ATL; 3	PHO; 2	CAR; 2	HOM; 3	2nd	4932
2004	Jimmie Johnson	48	Chevy	DAY; 5	CAR; 41	LVS; 16	ATL; 4	DAR; 1	BRI; 16	TEX; 9	MAR; 4	TAL; 4	CAL; 2	RCH; 2	CLT; 1	DOV; 32	POC; 1	MCH; 4	SON; 5	DAY; 2	CHI; 2	NHA; 11	POC; 1	IND; 36	GLN; 40	MCH; 40	BRI; 3	CAL; 14	RCH; 36	NHA; 11	DOV; 10	TAL; 37	KAN; 32	CLT; 1	MAR; 1	ATL; 1	PHO; 6	DAR; 1	HOM; 2	2nd	6498
2005	Jimmie Johnson	48	Chevy	DAY; 5	CAL; 2	LVS; 1	ATL; 2	BRI; 6	MAR; 8	TEX; 3	PHO; 15	TAL; 20	DAR; 7	RCH; 40	CLT; 1	DOV; 4	POC; 6	MCH; 19	SON; 36	DAY; 6	CHI; 3	NHA; 13	POC; 12	IND; 38	GLN; 5	MCH; 10	BRI; 36	CAL; 16	RCH; 25	NHA; 8	DOV; 1	TAL; 31	KAN; 6	CLT; 1	MAR; 3	ATL; 16	TEX; 5	PHO; 7	HOM; 40	5th	6406
2006	Jimmie Johnson	48	Chevy	DAY; 1	CAL; 2	LVS; 1	ATL; 6	BRI; 30	MAR; 3	TEX; 11	PHO; 7	TAL; 1	RCH; 12	DAR; 4	CLT; 2	DOV; 6	POC; 10	MCH; 6	SON; 10	DAY; 32	CHI; 6	NHA; 9	POC; 6	IND; 1	GLN; 17	MCH; 13	BRI; 10	CAL; 11	RCH; 23	NHA; 39	DOV; 13	KAN; 14	TAL; 24	CLT; 2	MAR; 1	ATL; 2	TEX; 2	PHO; 2	HOM; 9	1st	6475
2007	Jimmie Johnson	48	Chevy	DAY; 39	CAL; 3	LVS; 1	ATL; 1	BRI; 16	MAR; 1	TEX; 38	PHO; 4	TAL; 2	RCH; 1	DAR; 3	CLT; 10	DOV; 15	POC; 42	MCH; 19	SON; 17	NHA; 5	DAY; 10	CHI; 37	IND; 39	POC; 5	GLN; 3	MCH; 3	BRI; 21	CAL; 1	RCH; 1	NHA; 6	DOV; 14	KAN; 3	TAL; 2	CLT; 14	MAR; 1	ATL; 1	TEX; 1	PHO; 1	HOM; 7	1st	6723
2008	Jimmie Johnson	48	Chevy	DAY; 27	CAL; 2*	LVS; 29	ATL; 13	BRI; 18	MAR; 4	TEX; 2	PHO; 1	TAL; 13	RCH; 30	DAR; 13	CLT; 39	DOV; 7	POC; 6	MCH; 6	SON; 15	NHA; 9	DAY; 23	CHI; 2	IND; 1	POC; 3	GLN; 7	MCH; 17	BRI; 33	CAL; 1	RCH; 1	NHA; 2	DOV; 5	KAN; 1	TAL; 9	CLT; 6	MAR; 1	ATL; 2	TEX; 15	PHO; 1	HOM; 15	1st	6684
2009	Jimmie Johnson	48	Chevy	DAY; 31	CAL; 9	LVS; 24	ATL; 9	BRI; 3	MAR; 1	TEX; 2	PHO; 4	TAL; 30	RCH; 36	DAR; 2	CLT; 13	DOV; 1*	POC; 7	MCH; 22	SON; 4	NHA; 9	DAY; 2	CHI; 8	IND; 1	POC; 13	GLN; 12	MCH; 33	BRI; 8	ATL; 36	RCH; 11	NHA; 4	DOV; 1	KAN; 9	CAL; 1	CLT; 1	MAR; 2	TAL; 6	TEX; 38	PHO; 1	HOM; 5	1st	6652
2010	Jimmie Johnson	48	Chevy	DAY; 35	CAL; 1	LVS; 1	ATL; 12	BRI; 1	MAR; 9	PHO; 3	TEX; 2	TAL; 31	RCH; 10	DAR; 36	DOV; 16	CLT; 37	POC; 5	MCH; 6	SON; 1	NHA; 1	DAY; 31	CHI; 25	IND; 22	POC; 10	GLN; 28	MCH; 12	BRI; 35	ATL; 3	RCH; 3	NHA; 25	DOV; 1	KAN; 2	CAL; 3	CLT; 3	MAR; 5	TAL; 7	TEX; 9	PHO; 5	HOM; 2	1st	6622
2011	Jimmie Johnson	48	Chevy	DAY; 27	PHO; 3	LVS; 16	BRI; 3	CAL; 2	MAR; 11	TEX; 8	TAL; 1	RCH; 8	DAR; 15	DOV; 9	CLT; 28	KAN; 7	POC; 4	MCH; 27	SON; 7	DAY; 20	KEN; 3	NHA; 5	IND; 19	POC; 4	GLN; 10	MCH; 2	BRI; 4	ATL; 2	RCH; 31	CHI; 10	NHA; 18	DOV; 2	KAN; 1	CLT; 34	TAL; 26	MAR; 2	TEX; 14	PHO; 14	HOM; 32	6th	2304
2012	Jimmie Johnson	48	Chevy	DAY; 42	PHO; 4	LVS; 2	BRI; 9	CAL; 10	MAR; 12	TEX; 2	KAN; 3	RCH; 6	TAL; 35	DAR; 1	CLT; 11	DOV; 1	POC; 4	MCH; 5	SON; 5	KEN; 6	DAY; 36	NHA; 7	IND; 1	POC; 14	GLN; 3	MCH; 27	BRI; 2	ATL; 34	RCH; 13	CHI; 2	NHA; 2	DOV; 4	TAL; 17	CLT; 3	KAN; 9	MAR; 1	TEX; 1^{*}	PHO; 32	HOM; 36	3rd	2360
2013	Jimmie Johnson	48	Chevy	DAY; 1	PHO; 2	LVS; 6	BRI; 22	CAL; 12	MAR; 1^{*}	TEX; 6	KAN; 3	RCH; 12	TAL; 5	DAR; 4	CLT; 22	DOV; 17	POC; 1^{*}	MCH; 28	SON; 9	KEN; 9^{*}	DAY; 1^{*}	NHA; 6	IND; 2^{*}	POC; 13	GLN; 8	MCH; 40	BRI; 36	ATL; 28	RCH; 40	CHI; 5	NHA; 4	DOV; 1^{*}	KAN; 6	CLT; 4	TAL; 13^{*}	MAR; 5	TEX; 1^{*}	PHO; 3	HOM; 9	1st	2419
2014	Jimmie Johnson	48	Chevy	DAY; 5	PHO; 6	LVS; 6	BRI; 19	CAL; 24	MAR; 2	TEX; 25	DAR; 3	RCH; 32	TAL; 23	KAN; 9	CLT; 1*	DOV; 1*	POC; 6	MCH; 1	SON; 7	KEN; 10	DAY; 42	NHA; 42	IND; 14	POC; 39	GLN; 28	MCH; 9	BRI; 4	ATL; 4	RCH; 8	CHI; 12	NHA; 5	DOV; 3	KAN; 40	CLT; 17	TAL; 24*	MAR; 32	TEX; 1*	PHO; 39	HOM; 9	11th	2274
2015	Jimmie Johnson	48	Chevy	DAY; 5	ATL; 1	LVS; 41	PHO; 11	CAL; 9	MAR; 35	TEX; 1*	BRI; 2	RCH; 3	TAL; 2	KAN; 1	CLT; 40	DOV; 1	POC; 3	MCH; 19	SON; 6*	DAY; 2	KEN; 9	NHA; 22	IND; 15	POC; 6	GLN; 10	MCH; 39	BRI; 4	DAR; 19	RCH; 9	CHI; 11	NHA; 6	DOV; 41	CLT; 39	KAN; 3	TAL; 18	MAR; 12	TEX; 1	PHO; 5	HOM; 9	10th	2315
2016	Jimmie Johnson	48	Chevy	DAY; 16	ATL; 1	LVS; 3*	PHO; 11	CAL; 1	MAR; 9	TEX; 4	BRI; 23	RCH; 3	TAL; 22	KAN; 17	DOV; 25	CLT; 3	POC; 35	MCH; 16	SON; 13	DAY; 35	KEN; 32	NHA; 12	IND; 3	POC; 16	GLN; 40	BRI; 7	MCH; 6	DAR; 33	RCH; 11	CHI; 12*	NHA; 8	DOV; 7	CLT; 1*	KAN; 4	TAL; 23	MAR; 1	TEX; 11	PHO; 38	HOM; 1	1st	5040
2017	Jimmie Johnson	48	Chevy	DAY; 34	ATL; 19	LVS; 11	PHO; 9	CAL; 21	MAR; 15	TEX; 1	BRI; 1	RCH; 11	TAL; 8	KAN; 24	CLT; 17	DOV; 1	POC; 36	MCH; 10	SON; 13	DAY; 12	KEN; 40	NHA; 10	IND; 27	POC; 35	GLN; 29	MCH; 19	BRI; 11	DAR; 12	RCH; 8	CHI; 8	NHA; 14	DOV; 3	CLT; 7	TAL; 24	KAN; 11	MAR; 12	TEX; 27	PHO; 39	HOM; 27	10th	2260
2018	Jimmie Johnson	48	Chevy	DAY; 38	ATL; 27	LVS; 12	PHO; 14	CAL; 9	MAR; 15	TEX; 35	BRI; 3	RCH; 6	TAL; 12	DOV; 9	KAN; 19	CLT; 5	POC; 8	MCH; 20	SON; 11	CHI; 14	DAY; 23	KEN; 14	NHA; 10	POC; 17	GLN; 30	MCH; 28	BRI; 9	DAR; 39	IND; 16	LVS; 22	RCH; 8	ROV; 8	DOV; 36	TAL; 7	KAN; 22	MAR; 12	TEX; 15	PHO; 15	HOM; 14	14th	2242
2019	Jimmie Johnson	48	Chevy	DAY; 9	ATL; 24	LVS; 19	PHO; 8	CAL; 17	MAR; 24	TEX; 5	BRI; 10	RCH; 12	TAL; 33	DOV; 14	KAN; 6	CLT; 8	POC; 19	MCH; 15	SON; 12	CHI; 4	DAY; 3	KEN; 30	NHA; 30	POC; 15	GLN; 19	MCH; 34	BRI; 19	DAR; 16	IND; 35	LVS; 11	RCH; 10	ROV; 9	DOV; 8	TAL; 38	KAN; 10	MAR; 38	TEX; 34	PHO; 14	HOM; 13	18th	835
2020	Jimmie Johnson	48	Chevy	DAY; 35	LVS; 5	CAL; 7	PHO; 12	DAR; 38	DAR; 8	CLT; 40	CLT; 11	BRI; 3	ATL; 7	MAR; 10	HOM; 16	TAL; 13	POC; 21	POC; 16		KEN; 18	TEX; 26	KAN; 32	NHA; 12	MCH; 12	MCH; 11	DRC; 4	DOV; 7	DOV; 3	DAY; 17	DAR; 18	RCH; 31	BRI; 17	LVS; 11	TAL; 29	ROV; 13	KAN; 31	TEX; 36	MAR; 30	PHO; 5	18th	837
2020	Justin Allgaier	48	Chevy																IND; 37																					18th	837
2021	Alex Bowman	48	Chevy	DAY; 35	DRC; 10	HOM; 9	LVS; 27	PHO; 13	ATL; 3	BRD; 22	MAR; 34	RCH; 1	TAL; 38	KAN; 18	DAR; 17	DOV; 1	COA; 8	CLT; 5	SON; 9	NSS; 14	POC; 1	POC; 7	ROA; 22	ATL; 4	NHA; 9	GLN; 20	IRC; 17	MCH; 16	DAY; 7	DAR; 26	RCH; 12	BRI; 5	LVS; 22	TAL; 38	ROV; 10	TEX; 33	KAN; 11	MAR; 1	PHO; 18	14th	2240
2022	Alex Bowman	48	Chevy	DAY; 24	CAL; 25	LVS; 1	PHO; 14	ATL; 10	COA; 2	RCH; 8	MAR; 12	BRD; 6	TAL; 9	DOV; 5	DAR; 29	KAN; 9	CLT; 10	GTW; 13	SON; 16	NSS; 36	ROA; 12	ATL; 32	NHA; 35	POC; 11	IRC; 32	MCH; 9	RCH; 20	GLN; 14	DAY; 14	DAR; 10	KAN; 4*	BRI; 32	TEX; 29						PHO; 34	15th	2191
2022	Noah Gragson	48	Chevy																															TAL; 19	ROV; 23	LVS; 11	HOM; 25	MAR; 25		15th	2191
2023	Alex Bowman	48	Chevy	DAY; 5	CAL; 8	LVS; 3	PHO; 9	ATL; 14	COA; 3	RCH; 8	BRD; 29	MAR; 11	TAL; 13				CLT; 12	GTW; 26	SON; 15	NSS; 17	CSC; 37	ATL; 26	NHA; 14	POC; 24	RCH; 18	MCH; 33	IRC; 5	GLN; 23	DAY; 6	DAR; 33	KAN; 10	BRI; 13	TEX; 12	TAL; 28	ROV; 8	LVS; 34	HOM; 19	MAR; 32	PHO; 17	20th	747
2023	Josh Berry	48	Chevy											DOV; 10	KAN; 25	DAR; 30																								20th	747
2024	Alex Bowman	48	Chevy	DAY; 2	ATL; 27	LVS; 18	PHO; 20	BRI; 4	COA; 4	RCH; 17	MAR; 8	TEX; 37	TAL; 5	DOV; 8	KAN; 7	DAR; 8	CLT; 9	GTW; 28	SON; 15	IOW; 8	NHA; 36	NSS; 14	CSC; 1	POC; 3	IND; 31	RCH; 28	MCH; 27	DAY; 16	DAR; 19	ATL; 5	GLN; 18	BRI; 9	KAN; 6	TAL; 16	ROV; 38	LVS; 5	HOM; 7	MAR; 13	PHO; 14	9th	2318
2025	Alex Bowman	48	Chevy	DAY; 6	ATL; 26	COA; 9	PHO; 7	LVS; 7	HOM; 2	MAR; 27	DAR; 35	BRI; 37	TAL; 7	TEX; 35	KAN; 5	CLT; 29	NSS; 36	MCH; 36	MXC; 4	POC; 11	ATL; 3	CSC; 8	SON; 19	DOV; 3	IND; 9	IOW; 7	GLN; 20	RCH; 2	DAY; 36	DAR; 31	GTW; 26	BRI; 8	NHA; 15	KAN; 28	ROV; 18	LVS; 8	TAL; 29	MAR; 23	PHO; 15	13th	2192
2026	Alex Bowman	48	Chevy	DAY; 40	ATL; 23	COA; 36					BRI; 37	KAN; 18	TAL; 3	TEX; 3	GLN; 25	CLT; 17	NSS; 33	MCH; 19	POC; 27	COR; 26	SON; 10	CHI; 5	ATL; 22	NWS; 26	IND; 19	IOW; 34	RCH; 10	NHA; 15	DAY; 8	DAR; 12	GTW; 2	BRI; 35	KAN; 18	LVS; 11	CLT; 38	PHO; 29	TAL; 9	MAR; 13	HOM; 16	24th	638
2026	Anthony Alfredo	48	Chevy				PHO; 33																																	24th	638
2026	Justin Allgaier	48	Chevy					LVS; 25	DAR; 24	MAR; 22																														24th	638

=== Car No. 88 history ===
Dale Earnhardt Jr. (2008–2017)

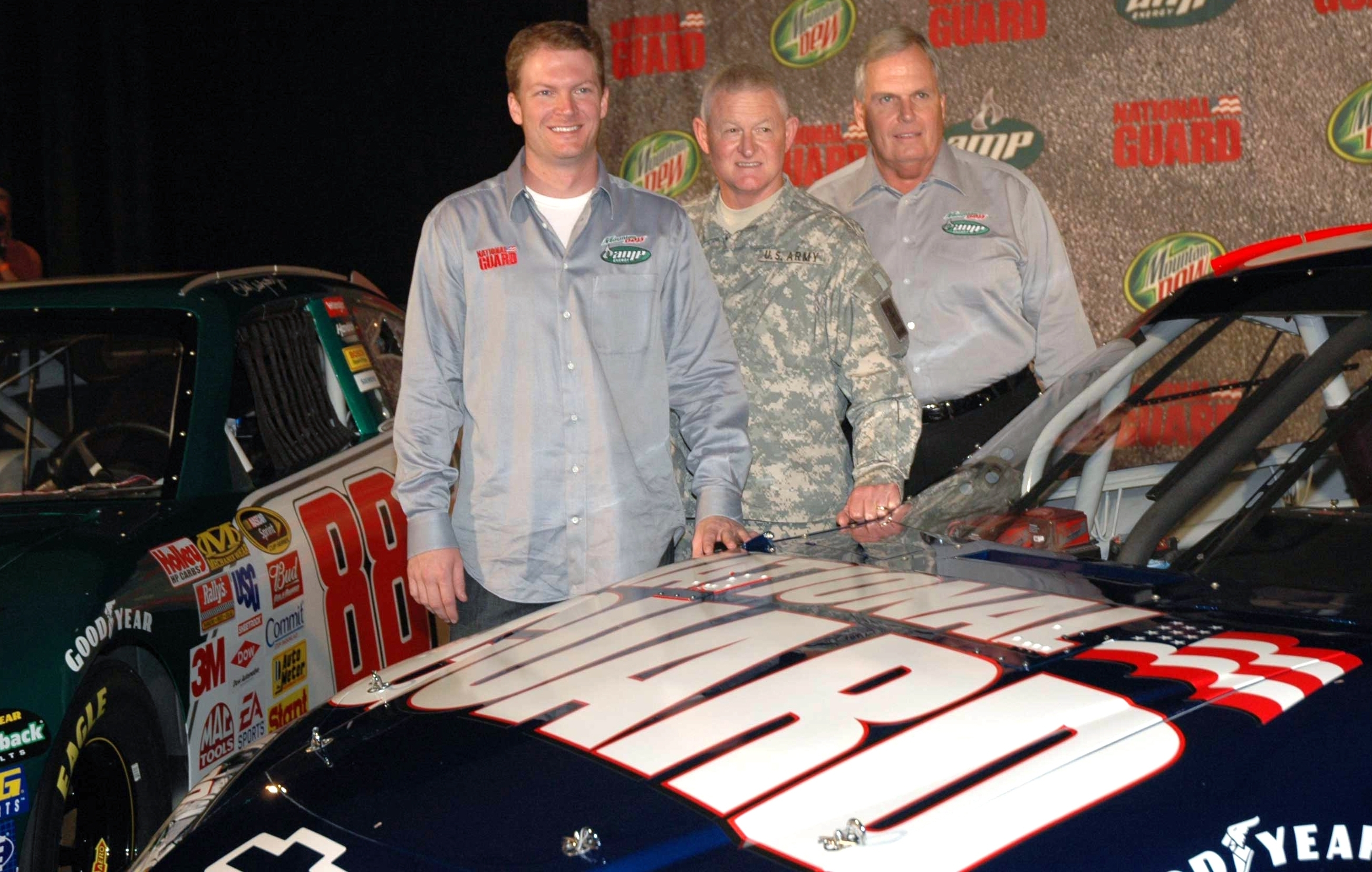
Dale Earnhardt Jr. stands with Lt. Gen. Clyde A. Vaughn, director of the Army National Guard, and team owner Rick Hendrick.

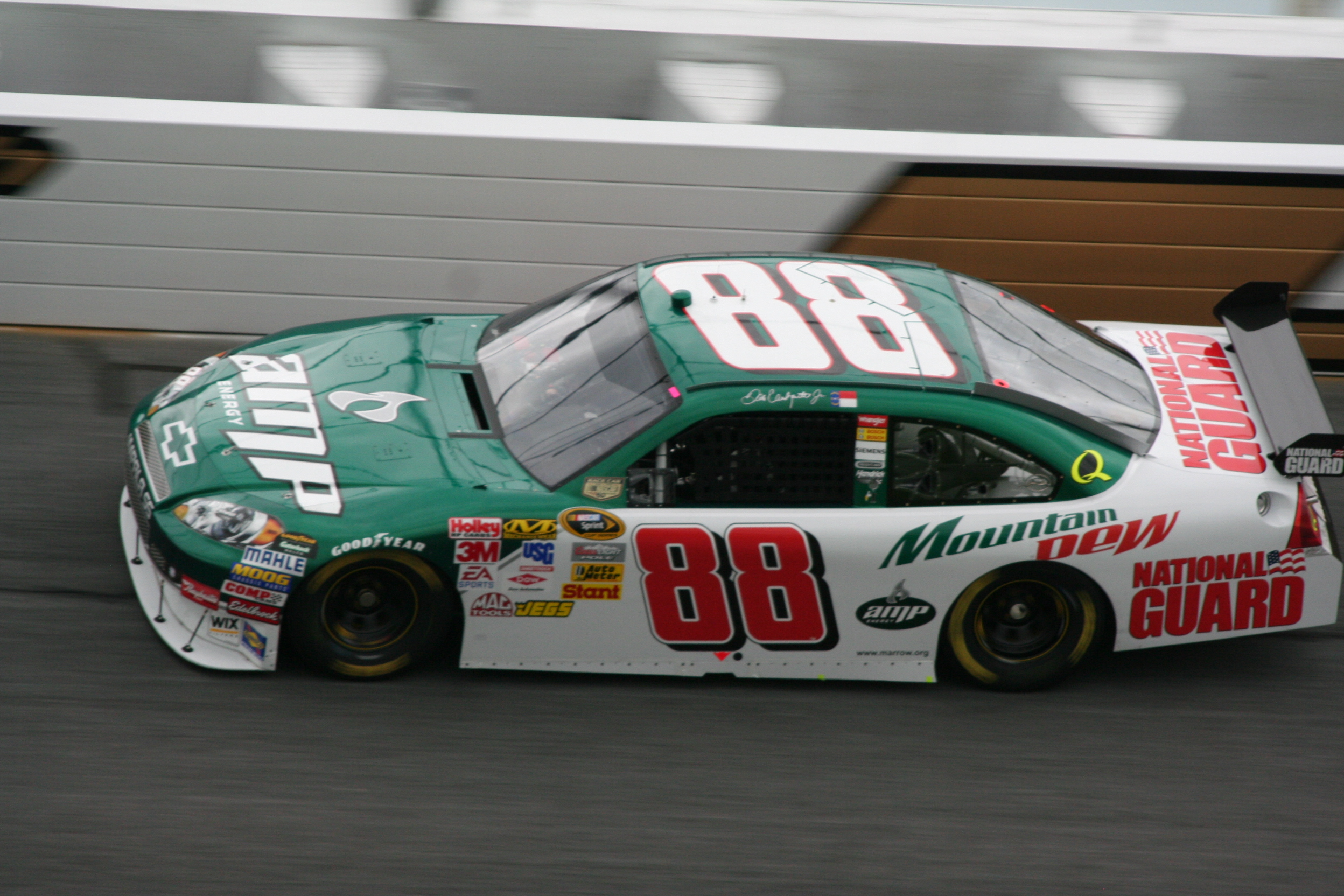
Dale Earnhardt Jr.'s No. 88 Amp Energy Chevrolet in 2008

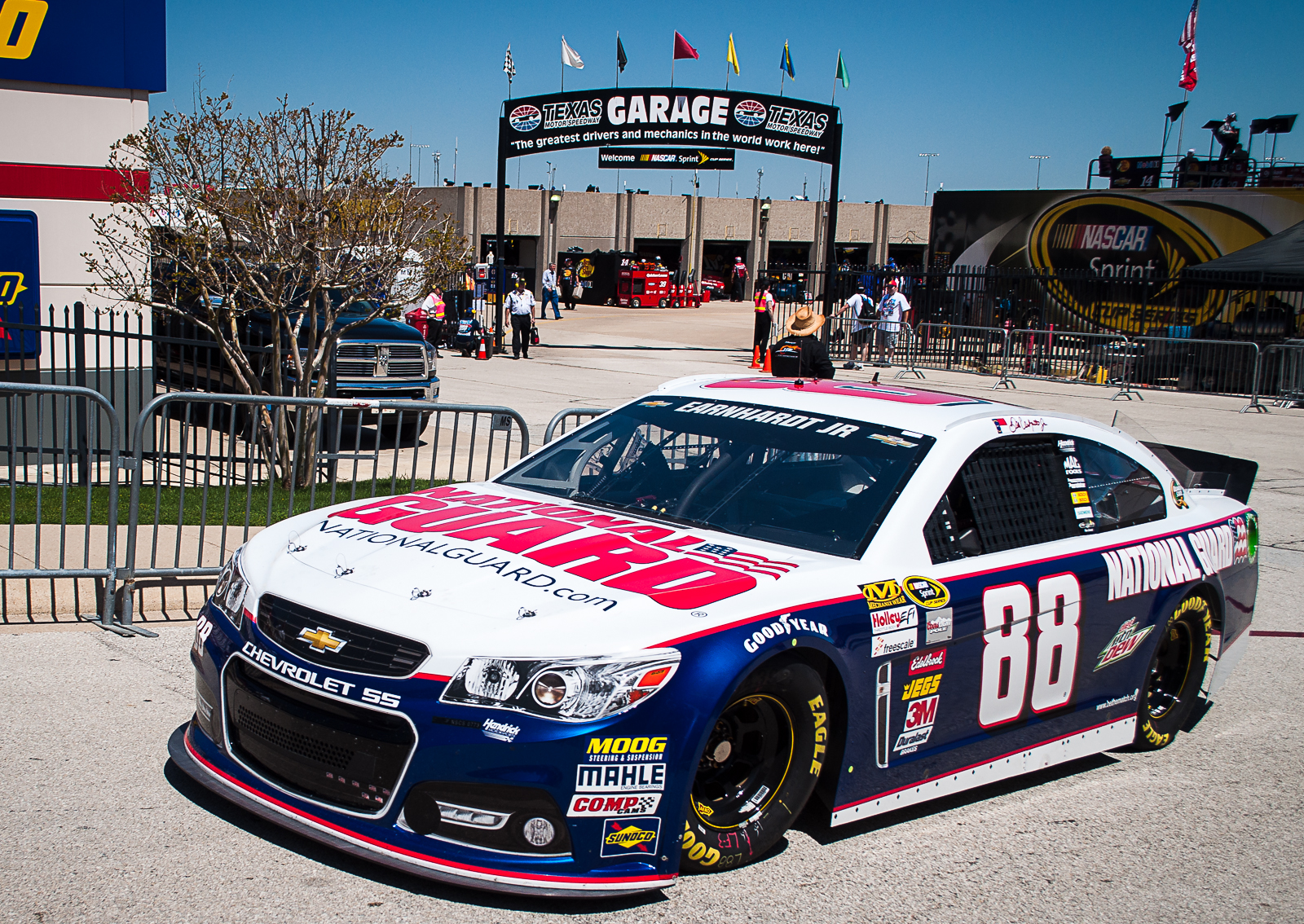
Dale Earnhardt Jr.'s No. 88 National Guard Chevrolet at Texas in 2013

On June 13, 2007, Dale Earnhardt Jr. announced he would join Hendrick Motorsports for the 2008 season. On September 14, 2007, it was announced that he would drive the No. 88 car, after a deal with Robert Yates Racing that sent the No. 88 car to Hendrick Motorsports. The No. 88 replaced the No. 25, which scaled back to part-time. Amp Energy (owned by longtime Hendrick sponsor PepsiCo) and the National Guard (which had sponsored the No. 25) stepped up to sponsor the car. Earnhardt Jr.'s crew chief and cousin, Tony Eury Jr., also made the move to Hendrick Motorsports. However, this partnership only lasted until April 2009 when Tony Eury Jr. was replaced by Lance McGrew, a technical advisor and part-time crew chief with HMS for the No. 25 car.

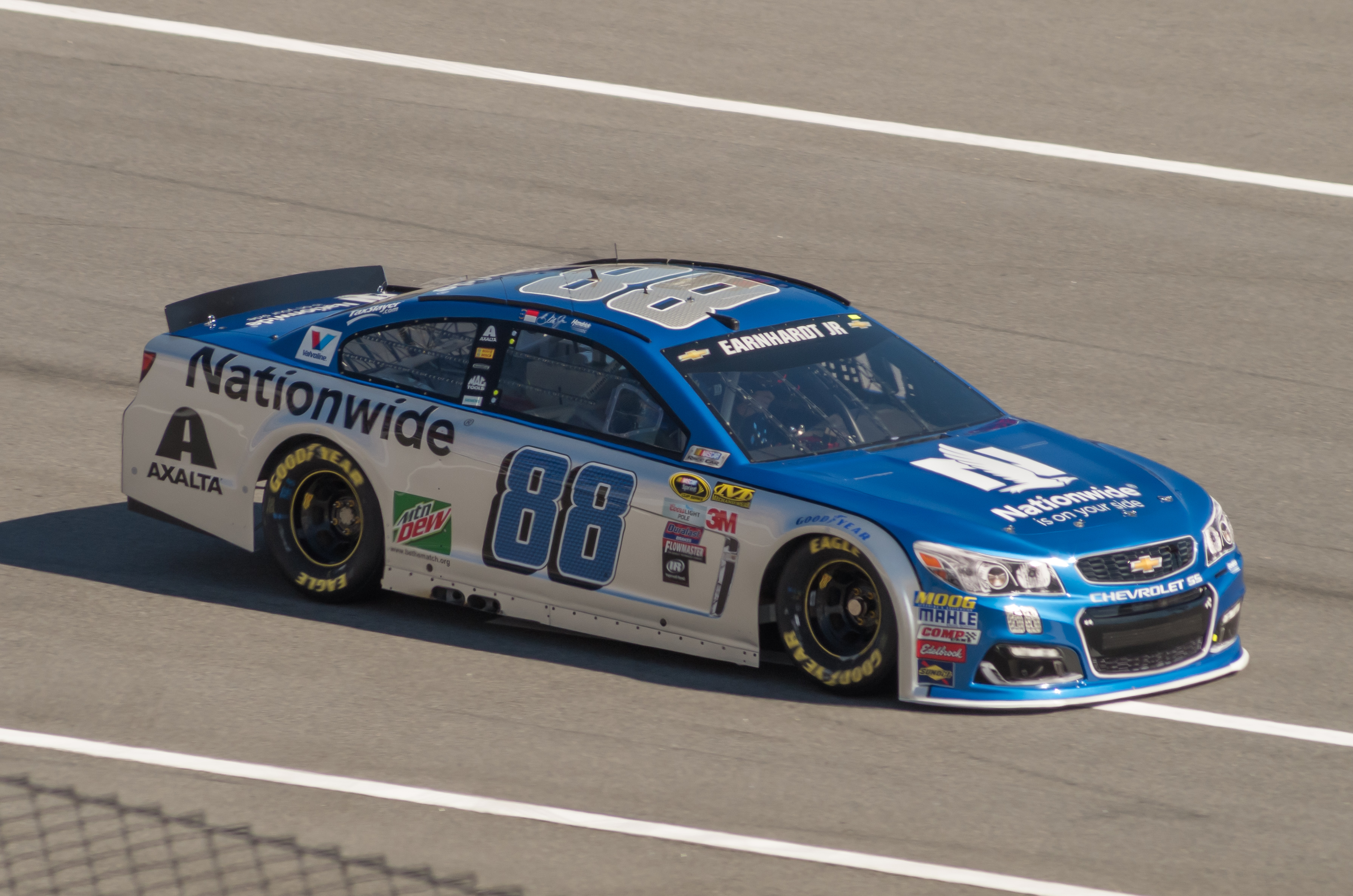
Dale Earnhardt Jr.'s No. 88 Nationwide Chevrolet at Daytona in 2016

At the start of the 2011 season, Hendrick Motorsports would shuffle the organization, and Earnhardt Jr, the No. 88 and his sponsors moved into the 24/48 shop, with Jeff Gordon's former crew Steve Letarte taking over as Earnhardt's crew chief. For 2012, PepsiCo decided to replace the struggling AMP Energy brand with the Diet Mountain Dew brand. The team won for the first time since 2008 and for the second consecutive year made the Chase, but Earnhardt suffered a concussion during an August Hollywood Casino 400 tire testing on the reconfigured Kansas, and was not tested for the concussion until the Good Sam Roadside Assistance 500 at Talladega, where he was involved in a second hard crash. After testing, Earnhardt was deemed medically unfit to race. Regan Smith, scheduled to drive for Phoenix Racing, instead drove the No. 88 at Charlotte and Kansas in what turned out to be a tryout that led to Smith joining Earnhardt's Xfinity team for 2013. Earnhardt returned at Martinsville and finished out the season.

Earnhardt finished fifth in Cup Series points in 2013, after winning two poles (at Kentucky and Dover), and posting five-second-place finishes.

The No. 88 returned to prominence in 2014 when Earnhardt won four races – the Daytona 500, both Pocono races, and the fall Martinsville race. Letarte joined NASCAR on NBC in 2015, and JR Motorsports crew chief Greg Ives was hired to replace him. On August 6 of that year, the National Guard decided not to renew their sponsorship with Earnhardt. They would be replaced by Nationwide Insurance, outgoing sponsor of the now-Xfinity Series and longtime sponsor of Earnhardt, for the 2015 season.

Late in 2015, it was announced that Axalta Coating Systems, longtime sponsor of Hendrick's No. 24, would move to sponsor the No. 88 in 2016.

In 2016, concussion-like symptoms ended Earnhardt's season after Kentucky. His replacements were Alex Bowman and Jeff Gordon. 2017 marked Earnhardt Jr.'s final full-time season in Hendrick's No. 88 as he announced his retirement in April of that year.

Alex Bowman (2018–2020)

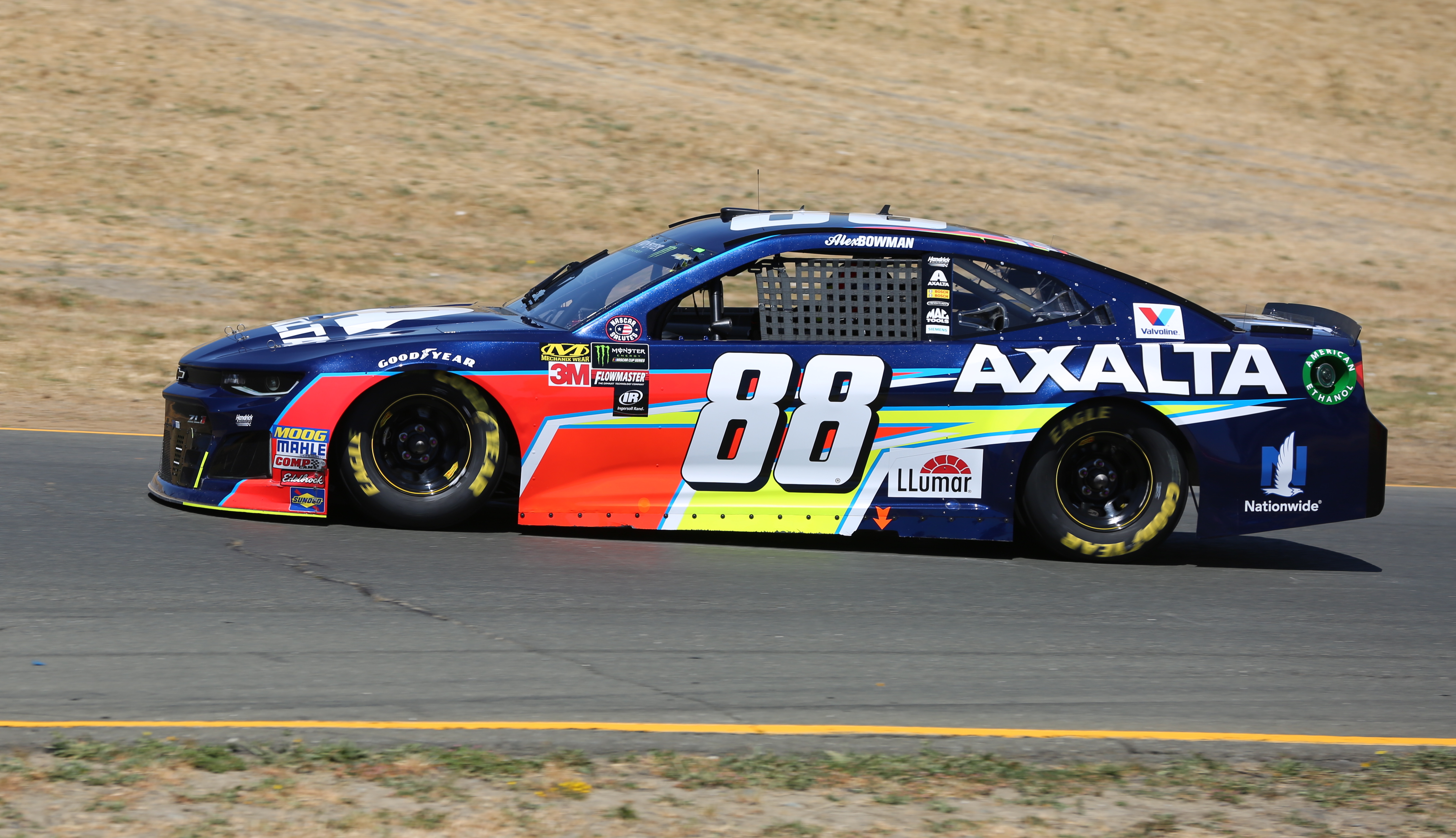
Alex Bowman's No. 88 Axalta Chevrolet at Sonoma in 2018

It was announced on July 20, 2017 that Bowman would take over the No. 88 car for the 2018 season. Despite being winless, Bowman made the Playoffs until he was eliminated from the Round of 12 at the fall Kansas race.

The 2019 season saw improvement in Bowman's finishes, including three consecutive second-place finishes at Talladega, Dover, and Kansas. Bowman also made the starting grid of the All-Star Race by winning the Fan Vote. It was announced on June 12, 2019, that Nationwide Insurance would not be sponsoring Hendrick Motorsports or the No. 88 after 2019, ending a five-year relationship prematurely. At the 2019 Camping World 400 at Chicagoland, Bowman held off a late charge from Kyle Larson to win his first career NASCAR Cup race. On June 13, 2019, Nationwide Insurance announced the end of their five-year sponsorship of the No. 88 after the 2019 season. On September 20, tool company Cincinnati Inc. signed a 10-year partnership deal with HMS, including primary sponsorship of the No. 88. He went to get eliminated after the Round Of 12 in the playoffs and finished 12th in the standings with one victory.

The 2020 Daytona 500 saw him finishing 24th after getting collected in multiple wrecks. Then, he was close to winning Las Vegas until he had to make a final stop and finished 13th. His luck finally came at Auto Club when he dominated the race, leading 110 laps to capture his 2nd career victory in the NASCAR Cup Series. Although it was his lone victory of the season, Bowman improved dramatically by finishing a career-best 6th in the final standings.

It was announced on October 6, 2020 that Alex Bowman and his crew chief, Greg Ives, will move over to the No. 48 car for the 2021 season. Later in the month, it was announced that Kyle Larson will join the team in 2021 as the driver of the No. 5 car, discontinuing the use of the No. 88 in the Cup Series by Hendrick Motorsports.

==== Car No. 88 results ====
Year	Driver	No.	Make	1	2	3	4	5	6	7	8	9	10	11	12	13	14	15	16	17	18	19	20	21	22	23	24	25	26	27	28	29	30	31	32	33	34	35	36	Owners	Pts
2008	Dale Earnhardt Jr.	88	Chevy	DAY; 9	CAL; 40	LVS; 2	ATL; 3	BRI; 5	MAR; 6*	TEX; 12	PHO; 7	TAL; 10	RCH; 15	DAR; 4	CLT; 5*	DOV; 35	POC; 4	MCH; 1	SON; 12	NHA; 24	DAY; 8*	CHI; 16	IND; 12	POC; 12	GLN; 22	MCH; 23	BRI; 18	CAL; 11	RCH; 4	NHA; 5	DOV; 24	KAN; 13	TAL; 28	CLT; 36	MAR; 2	ATL; 11	TEX; 20	PHO; 6	HOM; 41	12th	6127
2009	Dale Earnhardt Jr.	88	Chevy	DAY; 27	CAL; 39	LVS; 10	ATL; 11	BRI; 14	MAR; 8	TEX; 20	PHO; 31	TAL; 2	RCH; 27	DAR; 27	CLT; 40	DOV; 12	POC; 27	MCH; 14	SON; 26	NHA; 13	DAY; 39	CHI; 15	IND; 36	POC; 28	GLN; 39	MCH; 3	BRI; 9	ATL; 17	RCH; 21	NHA; 35	DOV; 20	KAN; 36	CAL; 25	CLT; 38	MAR; 29	TAL; 11	TEX; 25	PHO; 35	HOM; 28	25th	3422
2010	Dale Earnhardt Jr.	88	Chevy	DAY; 2	CAL; 32	LVS; 16	ATL; 15	BRI; 7	MAR; 15	PHO; 12	TEX; 8	TAL; 13	RCH; 32	DAR; 18	DOV; 30	CLT; 22	POC; 19	MCH; 7	SON; 11	NHA; 8	DAY; 4	CHI; 23	IND; 27	POC; 27	GLN; 26	MCH; 19	BRI; 13	ATL; 22	RCH; 34	NHA; 4	DOV; 23	KAN; 22	CAL; 16	CLT; 29	MAR; 7	TAL; 39*	TEX; 25	PHO; 14	HOM; 27	21st	3953
2011	Dale Earnhardt Jr.	88	Chevy	DAY; 24	PHO; 10	LVS; 8	BRI; 11	CAL; 12	MAR; 2	TEX; 9	TAL; 4	RCH; 19	DAR; 14	DOV; 12	CLT; 7	KAN; 2	POC; 6	MCH; 21	SON; 41	DAY; 19	KEN; 30	NHA; 15	IND; 16	POC; 9	GLN; 14	MCH; 14	BRI; 16	ATL; 19	RCH; 16	CHI; 3	NHA; 17	DOV; 24	KAN; 14	CLT; 19	TAL; 25	MAR; 7	TEX; 7	PHO; 24	HOM; 11	7th	2290
2012	Dale Earnhardt Jr.	88	Chevy	DAY; 2	PHO; 14	LVS; 10	BRI; 15	CAL; 3	MAR; 3	TEX; 10	KAN; 7	RCH; 2	TAL; 9	DAR; 17	CLT; 6	DOV; 4	POC; 8	MCH; 1*	SON; 23	KEN; 4	DAY; 15	NHA; 4	IND; 4	POC; 32	GLN; 28	MCH; 4	BRI; 12	ATL; 7	RCH; 14	CHI; 8	NHA; 13	DOV; 11	TAL; 20			MAR; 21	TEX; 7	PHO; 21	HOM; 10	12th	2245
2012	Regan Smith	88	Chevy																															CLT; 38	KAN; 7					12th	2245
2013	Dale Earnhardt Jr.	88	Chevy	DAY; 2	PHO; 5	LVS; 7	BRI; 6	CAL; 2	MAR; 24	TEX; 29	KAN; 16	RCH; 10	TAL; 17	DAR; 9	CLT; 39	DOV; 10	POC; 3	MCH; 37	SON; 12	KEN; 12	DAY; 8	NHA; 14	IND; 6	POC; 5	GLN; 30	MCH; 36	BRI; 10	ATL; 8	RCH; 13	CHI; 35	NHA; 6	DOV; 2	KAN; 8	CLT; 15	TAL; 2	MAR; 8	TEX; 2	PHO; 4	HOM; 3	5th	2363
2014	Dale Earnhardt Jr.	88	Chevy	DAY; 1*	PHO; 2	LVS; 2	BRI; 24	CAL; 12	MAR; 3	TEX; 43	DAR; 2	RCH; 7	TAL; 26	KAN; 5	CLT; 19	DOV; 9	POC; 1	MCH; 7	SON; 3	KEN; 5	DAY; 14	NHA; 10	IND; 9	POC; 1	GLN; 11	MCH; 5	BRI; 39	ATL; 11	RCH; 12	CHI; 11	NHA; 9	DOV; 17	KAN; 39	CLT; 20	TAL; 31	MAR; 1	TEX; 6	PHO; 8	HOM; 14	8th	2301
2015	Dale Earnhardt Jr.	88	Chevy	DAY; 3	ATL; 3	LVS; 4	PHO; 43	CAL; 6	MAR; 36	TEX; 3	BRI; 16	RCH; 14	TAL; 1*	KAN; 3	CLT; 3	DOV; 14	POC; 11	MCH; 2	SON; 7	DAY; 1*	KEN; 21	NHA; 5	IND; 22	POC; 4	GLN; 11	MCH; 10	BRI; 9	DAR; 8	RCH; 5	CHI; 12	NHA; 25	DOV; 3	CLT; 28	KAN; 21	TAL; 2*	MAR; 4	TEX; 6	PHO; 1	HOM; 40	12th	2310
2016	Dale Earnhardt Jr.	88	Chevy	DAY; 36	ATL; 2	LVS; 8	PHO; 5	CAL; 11	MAR; 14	TEX; 2	BRI; 2	RCH; 13	TAL; 40	KAN; 15	DOV; 32	CLT; 14	POC; 2	MCH; 39	SON; 11	DAY; 21	KEN; 13																			18th	895
2016	Alex Bowman	88	Chevy																			NHA; 26					MCH; 30			CHI; 10	NHA; 14		CLT; 39	KAN; 7	TAL; 36		TEX; 13	PHO; 6*	HOM; 16	18th	895
2016	Jeff Gordon	88	Chevy																				IND; 13	POC; 27	GLN; 14	BRI; 11		DAR; 14	RCH; 16			DOV; 10				MAR; 6				18th	895
2017	Dale Earnhardt Jr.	88	Chevy	DAY; 37	ATL; 30	LVS; 16	PHO; 14	CAL; 16	MAR; 34	TEX; 5	BRI; 38	RCH; 30	TAL; 22	KAN; 20	CLT; 10	DOV; 11	POC; 38	MCH; 9	SON; 6	DAY; 32	KEN; 12	NHA; 18	IND; 36	POC; 12	GLN; 37	MCH; 14	BRI; 23	DAR; 22	RCH; 13	CHI; 17	NHA; 34	DOV; 7	CLT; 12	TAL; 7	KAN; 7	MAR; 11	TEX; 35	PHO; 10	HOM; 25	21st	668
2018	Alex Bowman	88	Chevy	DAY; 17	ATL; 20	LVS; 16	PHO; 13	CAL; 13	MAR; 7	TEX; 28	BRI; 5	RCH; 18	TAL; 8	DOV; 23	KAN; 18	CLT; 9	POC; 27	MCH; 16	SON; 9	CHI; 10	DAY; 10	KEN; 39	NHA; 11	POC; 3	GLN; 14	MCH; 19	BRI; 8	DAR; 23	IND; 33	LVS; 19	RCH; 12	ROV; 4	DOV; 28	TAL; 33	KAN; 9	MAR; 17	TEX; 14	PHO; 30	HOM; 29	16th	2204
2019	Alex Bowman	88	Chevy	DAY; 11	ATL; 15	LVS; 11	PHO; 35	CAL; 21	MAR; 14	TEX; 18	BRI; 23	RCH; 17	TAL; 2	DOV; 2	KAN; 2	CLT; 7	POC; 15	MCH; 10	SON; 14	CHI; 1	DAY; 21	KEN; 17	NHA; 14	POC; 20	GLN; 14	MCH; 10	BRI; 15	DAR; 18	IND; 21	LVS; 6	RCH; 23	ROV; 2	DOV; 3	TAL; 37	KAN; 11	MAR; 30	TEX; 5	PHO; 23	HOM; 9	12th	2257
2020	Alex Bowman	88	Chevy	DAY; 24	LVS; 13	CAL; 1*	PHO; 14	DAR; 2	DAR; 18	CLT; 19*	CLT; 31	BRI; 37	ATL; 12	MAR; 6	HOM; 18	TAL; 7	POC; 27	POC; 9	IND; 30	KEN; 19	TEX; 30	KAN; 8	NHA; 15	MCH; 21	MCH; 36	DRC; 12	DOV; 21	DOV; 5	DAY; 7	DAR; 6	RCH; 9	BRI; 16	LVS; 5	TAL; 14	ROV; 8	KAN; 3	TEX; 5	MAR; 6	PHO; 16	6th	2371

== Additional cars ==
Car No. 35 (1987)

In 1987, Benny Parsons drove for Hendrick's second team as a replacement for Tim Richmond. Hendrick kept the No. 25 available for Richmond to run a limited schedule, so Parsons drove the No. 35 car instead with Richmond's crew chief Harry Hyde. Parsons opened the year with a second-place finish at the Daytona 500. Parsons ended up running the entire season, with the team temporarily expanding to four teams when Richmond returned for eight races, and finished sixteenth in points with six top-fives and nine top-tens.

Car No. 44 (2005–2006)

In 2005, Terry Labonte took over the car after he announced he became semi-retired; the number had been changed to No. 44, used by Labonte during his first championship season in 1984. Kyle Busch, meanwhile, moved to his No. 5 car full-time. Sponsored by Kellogg's, Pizza Hut, and GMAC/Ditech.com, Labonte drove the car in a limited schedule over the next two years. His final race with the team was at Texas in November 2006, in a special commemorative paint scheme sponsored by longtime-partner Kellogg's. Though Labonte planned to retire following the race, he would race on a part-time or substitute basis until 2014.

Car No. 46 (1993)

In 1993, Hendrick fielded a car numbered 46 for two races. The first race was that year's Daytona 500 as Al Unser Jr. qualified for his only career NASCAR race in a Valvoline-sponsored car (Valvoline being his then-primary sponsor in the IndyCar Series). The second saw Buddy Baker fail to qualify a DuPont-sponsored car at Talladega in the spring.

Car No. 58 (1995)

In 1995, Hendrick fielded the No. 58 Leukemia Society of America Chevrolet for the season finale at Atlanta. The car was originally entered as a safety car for Jeff Gordon to clinch his first championship, as Gordon had to finish 41st or better in the 42-car field. The No. 58 was to be driven by Jimmy Horton, but after Horton was injured in a crash during the ARCA race the previous day, Jeff Purvis was hired as a relief driver. Gordon clinched the championship by staying out on green flag pit stops. Purvis came in 26th place. The No. 58 would not return until 2001 as the No. 48 car.

Car No. 60 (2002–2003)

In 2002, Hendrick fielded the No. 60 Haas Automation/NetZero-sponsored Chevrolet, fielded jointly between Hendrick and Gene Haas in preparation for Haas to field a new team, Haas CNC Racing. Hendrick driver Jack Sprague attempted six races (qualifying for three) with a best finish of 30th at Homestead. While Haas and Sprague moved over to the No. 0 Pontiac, the No. 60 returned as a Hendrick R&D car in 2003 with test driver David Green and continued sponsorship from Haas and NetZero. Green attempted the four restrictor plate races (missing the first Daytona and Talladega races) with a best finish of 32nd. Brian Vickers made his Cup Series debut at the fall Charlotte race, finishing 33rd, before moving to the 25 car. The 60 was entered at the Homestead season-finale with Kyle Busch and Ditech.com, but withdrew after the car failed pre-race inspection.

Car No. 84 (2004)

18-year-old Kyle Busch took over the car the following season, selecting the number 84 (reverse of No. 48) for the Carquest Chevy. He made his debut at his hometown track Las Vegas where Busch qualified 18th but brushed the wall early in the race and ended up not finishing the race after 11 laps with engine issues. Busch made five more starts that year with a best finish of twenty-fourth at California. In those six starts, Busch had an average finish of 35.2 with 4 DNFs and 3 DNQs.

=== Days of Thunder ===
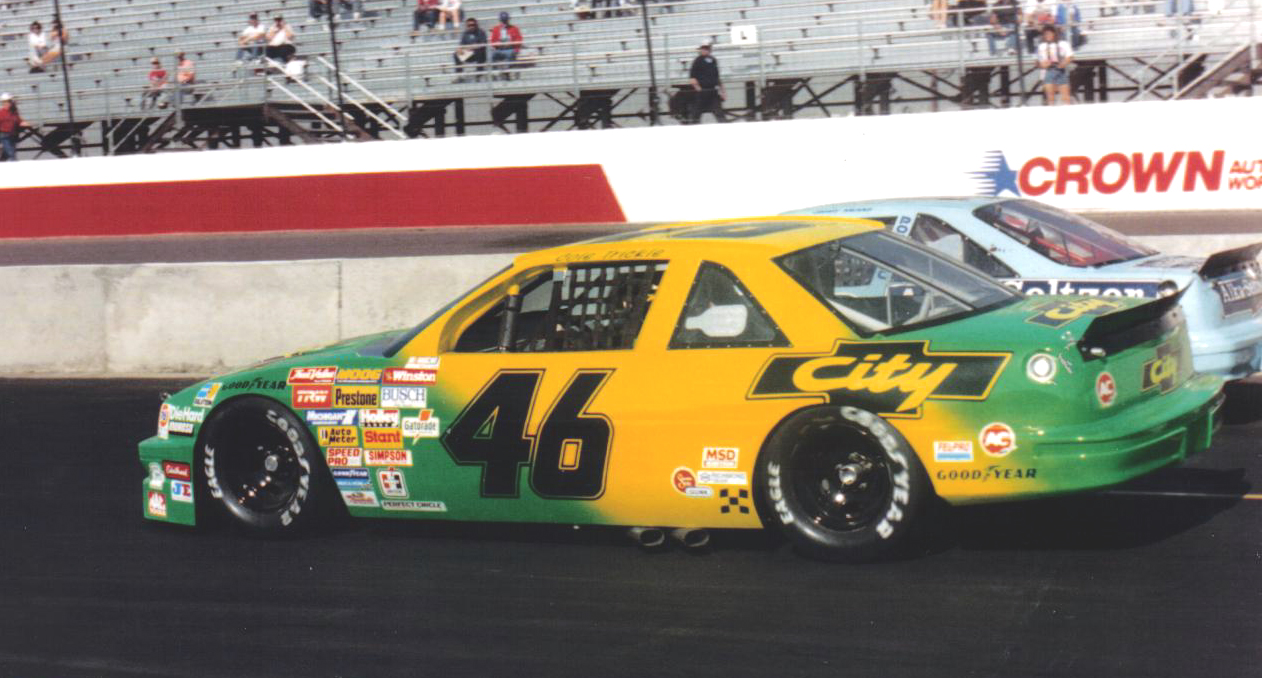
Greg Sacks' No. 46 City Chevrolet car at Phoenix in 1989

In 1989 and 1990, Hendrick Motorsports served as a technical consultant during the filming of Days of Thunder, including providing camera-equipped race cars to capture racing footage. The team prepared 14 race cars for the filming. In-race footage was taken at the 1989 Autoworks 500 at Phoenix, and the 1990 Daytona 500, in addition to stunt footage shot outside of NASCAR events. At each race, the cars would run 100 miles before start and parking. At Phoenix, Hendrick qualified two movie cars: the No. 46 City Chevrolet Lumina driven by Greg Sacks, and the No. 51 Exxon Lumina driven by Bobby Hamilton. An additional car, the No. 18 Exxon Lumina driven by Tommy Ellis, failed to qualify. Though the cars were not intended to run competitively, Hamilton qualified fifth and led five laps before pulling off the track. Sacks would run the 46 in the Busch Clash exhibition race at Daytona in early 1990, finishing second in one of the movie cars. After the incident at Phoenix, the two cars fielded at the Daytona 500 with Ellis (No. 18 Hardee's Lumina) and Hamilton (No. 51 Mello Yello Lumina) were not officially scored.

Following the production of the film, Sacks continued to drive for Hendrick's research and development team on a part-time basis in 1990. Sacks attempted two races (1 DNQ) in the No. 46, twelve in the No. 18 with sponsorship from Ultra Slim Fast, and three in the No. 17 as a substitute for Darrell Waltrip. Sacks earned a second-place finish at Talladega in May, and a pole at Daytona in July. The team was shut down and Sacks released at the end of the year, due to Slim Fast ending its sponsorship.

=== Additional car results ===
Year	Driver	No.	Make	1	2	3	4	5	6	7	8	9	10	11	12	13	14	15	16	17	18	19	20	21	22	23	24	25	26	27	28	29	30	31	32	33	34	35	36	Owners	Pts
1985	Dick Brooks	1	Chevy	DAY	RCH	CAR	ATL	BRI	DAR	NWS	MAR	TAL	DOV	CLT; 10	RSD	POC	MCH	DAY	POC	TAL	MCH	BRI	DAR	RCH	DOV	MAR	NWS	CLT	CAR	ATL	RSD										
1986	Brett Bodine	2	Chevy	DAY	RCH	CAR	ATL	BRI	DAR	NWS	MAR	TAL	DOV	CLT; 18	RSD	POC	MCH	DAY	POC	TAL	GLN	MCH	BRI	DAR	RCH	DOV	MAR	NWS	CLT	CAR	ATL	RSD									
1987	Benny Parsons	35	Chevy	DAY; 2	CAR; 34	RCH; 10	ATL; 2	DAR; 21	NWS; 15	BRI; 28	MAR; 26	TAL; 12	CLT; 26	DOV; 5	POC; 33	RSD; 34	MCH; 9	DAY; 35	POC; 4	TAL; 30	GLN; 5	MCH; 18	BRI; 26	DAR; 31	RCH; 16	DOV; 16	MAR; 23	NWS; 19	CLT; 38	CAR; 15	RSD; 2	ATL; 7									
1987	Jim Fitzgerald	51	Chevy	DAY	CAR	RCH	ATL	DAR	NWS	BRI	MAR	TAL	CLT	DOV	POC	RSD; 17	MCH	DAY	POC	TAL																					
1987	Paul Newman	51	Chevy																		GLN; Wth	MCH	BRI	DAR	RCH	DOV	MAR	NWS	CLT	CAR	RSD	ATL									
1987	Jimmy Means	52	Chevy	DAY	CAR	RCH	ATL	DAR	NWS	BRI	MAR	TAL	CLT	DOV	POC	RSD	MCH	DAY	POC	TAL	GLN	MCH	BRI	DAR	RCH	DOV	MAR	NWS	CLT; 40	CAR	RSD	ATL									
1988	Sarel van der Merwe	18	Chevy	DAY; DNQ	RCH	CAR	ATL	DAR	BRI	NWS	MAR	TAL	CLT	DOV																											
1988	Rick Hendrick	18	Chevy												RSD; 15	POC	MCH	DAY	POC	TAL	GLN	MCH	BRI	DAR	RCH	DOV	MAR	CLT	NWS	CAR	PHO	ATL									
1988	Rob Moroso	47	Chevy	DAY	RCH	CAR	ATL	DAR	BRI	NWS	MAR	TAL	CLT	DOV	RSD	POC	MCH	DAY	POC	TAL	GLN	MCH	BRI	DAR	RCH	DOV	MAR	CLT; 14	NWS	CAR	PHO	ATL									
1989	Kyle Petty	42	Chevy	DAY	CAR	ATL	RCH	DAR	BRI	NWS	MAR	TAL	CLT; 17	DOV	SON	POC	MCH	DAY	POC	TAL	GLN	MCH	BRI	DAR	RCH	DOV	MAR	CLT	NWS	CAR	PHO	ATL									
1989	Tommy Kendall	18	Chevy	DAY	CAR	ATL	RCH	DAR	BRI	NWS	MAR	TAL	CLT	DOV	SON	POC	MCH	DAY	POC	TAL	GLN; 27	MCH	BRI	DAR	RCH	DOV	MAR	CLT	NWS	CAR											
1989	Tommy Ellis	18	Chevy																												PHO; DNQ	ATL									
1989	Greg Sacks	46	Chevy	DAY	CAR	ATL	RCH	DAR	BRI	NWS	MAR	TAL	CLT	DOV	SON	POC	MCH	DAY	POC	TAL	GLN	MCH	BRI	DAR	RCH	DOV	MAR	CLT	NWS	CAR	PHO; 38	ATL									
1989	Bobby Hamilton	51	Chevy	DAY	CAR	ATL	RCH	DAR	BRI	NWS	MAR	TAL	CLT	DOV	SON	POC	MCH	DAY	POC	TAL	GLN	MCH	BRI	DAR	RCH	DOV	MAR	CLT	NWS	CAR	PHO; 32	ATL									
1990	Greg Sacks	46	Chevy	DAY	RCH	CAR	ATL; DNQ	DAR; 37	BRI	NWS	MAR	TAL	CLT	DOV	SON	POC	MCH	DAY	POC	TAL	GLN	MCH	BRI	DAR	RCH	DOV	MAR	NWS	CLT	CAR	PHO	ATL									
1990	Hut Stricklin	51	Chevy	DAY	RCH	CAR	ATL	DAR; 36	BRI	NWS	MAR	TAL	CLT	DOV	SON	POC	MCH	DAY	POC	TAL	GLN	MCH	BRI	DAR	RCH	DOV	MAR	NWS	CLT	CAR	PHO	ATL									
1990	Greg Sacks	18	Chevy	DAY	RCH	CAR	ATL	DAR	BRI	NWS	MAR	TAL; 2	CLT; 14	DOV		POC; 7	MCH; 26	DAY; 37	POC; 33	TAL; 18	GLN; 40	MCH	BRI	DAR	RCH; 23	DOV; 21	MAR	NWS	CLT; Wth	CAR	PHO; 12	ATL; 10									
1990	Stan Barrett	18	Chevy												SON; 17																										
1993	Al Unser Jr.	46	Chevy	DAY; 36	CAR	RCH	ATL	DAR	BRI	NWS	MAR	TAL	SON	CLT	DOV	POC	MCH	DAY	NHA	POC																					
1993	Buddy Baker	46	Chevy																		TAL; DNQ	GLN	MCH	BRI	DAR	RCH	DOV	MAR	NWS	CLT	CAR	PHO	ATL								
1995	Jimmy Horton	58	Chevy	DAY	CAR	RCH	ATL	DAR	BRI	NWS	MAR	TAL	SON	CLT	DOV	POC	MCH	DAY	NHA	POC	TAL	IND	GLN	MCH	BRI	DAR	RCH	DOV	MAR	NWS	CLT	CAR	PHO	ATL; QL^{†}							
1995	Jeff Purvis	58	Chevy																															ATL; 26							
1995	Jack Sprague	59	Chevy	DAY	CAR	RCH	ATL	DAR	BRI	NWS	MAR	TAL	SON	CLT	DOV	POC	MCH	DAY	NHA	POC	TAL	IND	GLN	MCH	BRI	DAR	RCH	DOV	MAR	NWS	CLT	CAR	PHO	ATL; DNQ							
1997	Jack Sprague	52	Chevy	DAY	CAR	RCH	ATL	DAR	TEX	BRI	MAR	SON	TAL	CLT	DOV	POC	MCH	CAL	DAY	NHA	POC	IND	GLN	MCH	BRI	DAR	RCH	NHA	DOV	MAR	CLT	TAL	CAR	PHO; DNQ	ATL						
2002	Jack Sprague	60	Chevy	DAY	CAR	LVS	ATL	DAR	BRI	TEX	MAR	TAL	CAL	RCH	CLT; Wth	DOV	POC	MCH	SON	DAY	CHI	NHA	POC	IND	GLN	MCH	BRI	DAR	RCH	NHA	DOV	KAN; 35	TAL	CLT; DNQ	MAR	ATL; DNQ	CAR; 35	PHO; DNQ	HOM; 30	57th	189
2003	David Green	60	Chevy	DAY; DNQ	CAR	LVS	ATL	DAR	BRI	TEX	TAL; DNQ	MAR	CAL	RCH	CLT	DOV	POC	MCH	SON	DAY; 32	CHI	NHA	POC	IND	GLN	MCH	BRI	DAR	RCH	NHA	DOV	TAL; 35	KAN							60th	125
2003	Brian Vickers	60	Chevy																															CLT; 33	MAR	ATL	PHO	CAR		60th	125
2003	Kyle Busch	60	Chevy																																				HOM; Wth	60th	125
2004	Kyle Busch	84	Chevy	DAY	CAR	LVS; 41	ATL	DAR	BRI	TEX; DNQ	MAR	TAL	CAL	RCH	CLT; 32	DOV	POC	MCH	SON	DAY	CHI	NHA; DNQ	POC	IND	GLN	MCH; DNQ	BRI	CAL; 24	RCH	NHA	DOV	TAL	KAN; 37	CLT; 34	MAR	ATL; 43	PHO	DAR	HOM	52nd	429
2005	Terry Labonte	44	Chevy	DAY	CAL; 36	LVS	ATL	BRI; 18	MAR	TEX; 40	PHO	TAL	DAR	RCH	CLT; 38	DOV	POC; 12	MCH	SON	DAY	CHI; 42	NHA	POC	IND; 36	GLN	MCH	BRI	CAL	RCH	NHA	DOV	TAL	KAN; 33	CLT	MAR	ATL	TEX; 31	PHO	HOM	49th	624
2006	Terry Labonte	44	Chevy	DAY	CAL	LVS	ATL	BRI	MAR	TEX; 25	PHO	TAL	RCH	DAR; 34	CLT; 33	DOV	POC; 39	MCH	SON	DAY	CHI; 43	NHA	POC; 25	IND	GLN	MCH	BRI	CAL; 40	RCH	NHA	DOV	KAN; 38	TAL	CLT; 21	MAR	ATL	TEX; 36	PHO	HOM	46th	628
^{†} - Qualified but replaced by Jeff Purvis
