= Casey Mears =

American racing driver (born 1978)

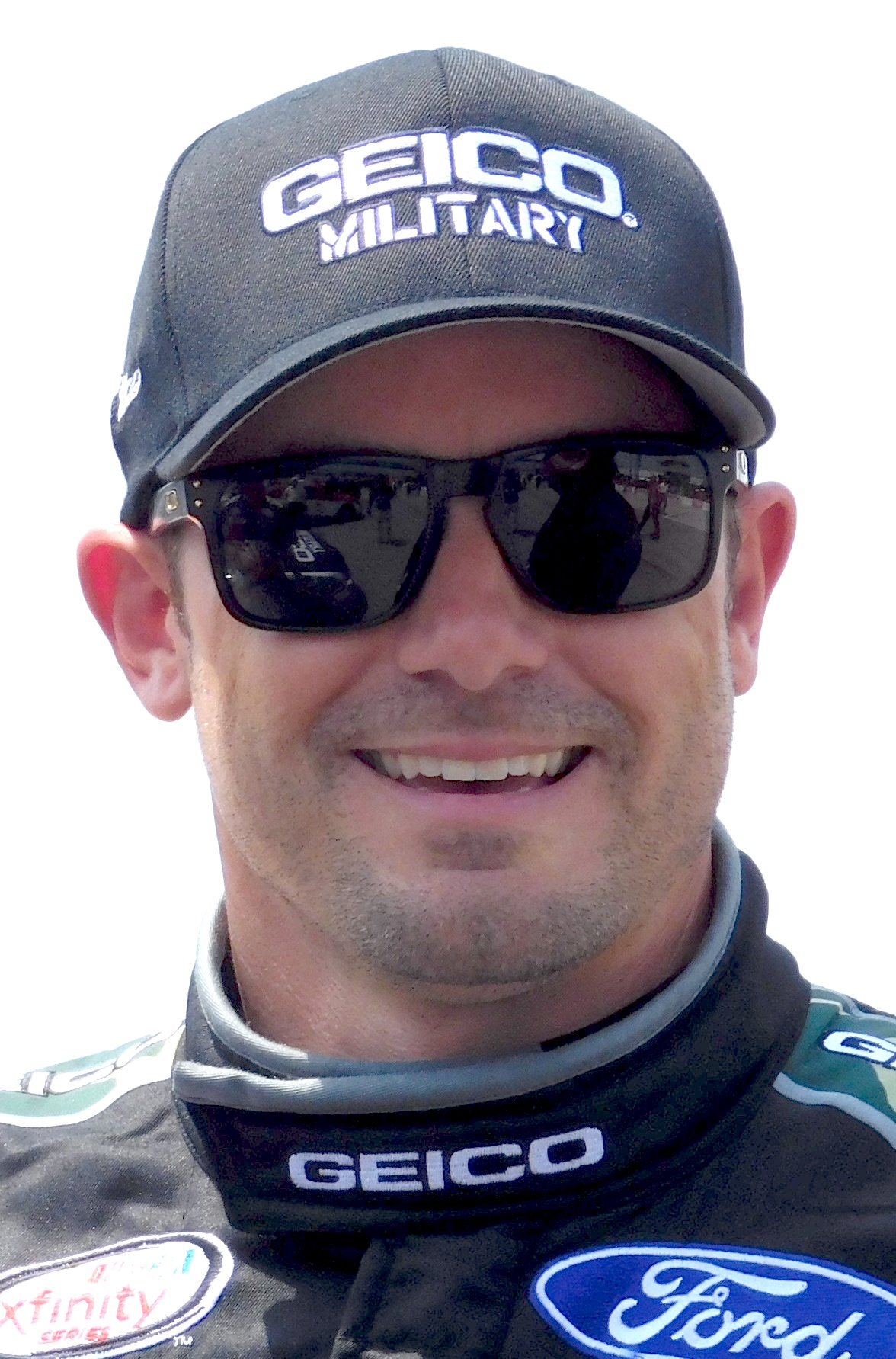
- Mears at Richmond International Speedway in 2017
- Born: Casey James Mears; March 12, 1978 (age 48); Bakersfield, California, U.S.
- Achievements: 2007 Coca-Cola 600 winner 2006 24 Hours of Daytona overall co-winner

NASCAR Cup Series career
- 500 races run over 17 years
- 2026 position: 37th
- Best finish: 14th (2006)
- First race: 2003 Daytona 500 (Daytona)
- Last race: 2026 Season Finale 400 (Homestead)
- First win: 2007 Coca-Cola 600 (Charlotte)
| Wins | Top tens | Poles |
|---|---|---|
| 1 | 51 | 3 |

NASCAR O'Reilly Auto Parts Series career
- 107 races run over 10 years
- 2017 position: 28th
- Best finish: 20th (2007)
- First race: 2001 GNC Live Well 300 (Homestead)
- Last race: 2017 Ford EcoBoost 300 (Homestead)
- First win: 2006 USG Durock 300 (Chicagoland)
| Wins | Top tens | Poles |
|---|---|---|
| 1 | 34 | 4 |

NASCAR FedEx Freight Truck Series career
- 1 race run over 1 year
- 2025 position: 62nd
- Best finish: 62nd (2025)
- First race: 2025 Slim Jim 200 (Martinsville)
| Wins | Top tens | Poles |
|---|---|---|
| 0 | 0 | 0 |

ARCA Menards Series career
- 6 races run over 3 years
- Best finish: 26th (2003)
- First race: 2001 Food World 300 (Talladega)
- Last race: 2003 Pennsylvania 200 (Pocono)
- First win: 2003 Flagstar 200 (Michigan)
- Last win: 2003 Pennsylvania 200 (Pocono)
| Wins | Top tens | Poles |
|---|---|---|
| 3 | 5 | 2 |

IndyCar Series career
- 3 races run over 1 year
- 2001 position: 31st
- Best finish: 31st (2001)
- First race: 2001 Pennzoil Copper World Indy 200 (Phoenix)
- Last race: 2001 Atlanta 500 Classic (Atlanta)
| Wins | Podiums | Poles |
|---|---|---|
| 0 | 0 | 0 |

Champ Car career
- 5 races run over 2 years
- Best finish: 23rd (2000)
- First race: 2000 Marlboro 500 (California)
- Last race: 2001 Marlboro 500 (California)
| Wins | Podiums | Poles |
|---|---|---|
| 0 | 0 | 0 |
- Statistics up to date as of November 8, 2026.

Casey James Mears (born March 12, 1978) is an American professional off-road and stock car racing driver. He last competed part-time in the NASCAR Cup Series, driving the No. 66 Ford Mustang Dark Horse for Garage 66, and the No. 62 Chevrolet Camaro ZL1 for Beard Motorsports. He has raced in IndyCar, NASCAR's three national series, including fifteen seasons in the Cup Series, SCORE International, and the Stadium Super Trucks. A former winner of the Coca-Cola 600, Mears is a member of the Mears racing family as the nephew of four-time Indianapolis 500 winner Rick Mears and the son of IndyCar and off-road veteran Roger Mears.

== Early career and open-wheel racing ==
Mears is a native of Bakersfield, California. After racing in go-karts for a season in 1991, Mears began competing in the SuperLites Off-Road Series in 1992, where he posted several top-three finishes. He moved to sprint cars in 1994 and finished third in the Jim Russell USAC Triple Crown Championship, with a win at Mesa Marin Raceway. The next season, he won the championship in the USAC series.

In 1996, Mears made his Dayton Indy Lights debut at the Cleveland Grand Prix and finished eighth. The following year, he competed full-time in the Indy Lights championship and in 1999 finished second, losing by fourteen points. He became just the fourth driver in Indy Lights series history to complete every lap in a single season. Mears continued to compete in the Indy Lights in 2000 and won his first race at the Grand Prix of Houston meeting in October.

After testing Indy Cars for multiple teams in 2000, Mears was offered a chance to drive a third entry for Team Rahal at California Speedway in October. After qualifying fifteenth and leading ten laps, he posted a career-best fourth finish in his CART Series debut. He ran three IRL events at the start of the 2001 season and attempted to qualify for the 2001 Indianapolis 500, but ultimately did not make it. He ended the season by filling in for injured Champ Car driver Alex Zanardi, posting one top-ten finish in four starts.

Mears had five CART starts, with one top-five finish, and three IRL starts, with no top-five finishes.

== NASCAR ==
=== Early Years (2001–02) ===
Mears made his NASCAR debut in the Busch Series in 2001 at Homestead-Miami Speedway, driving the No. 66 car for Cicci-Welliver Racing. He started 21st and finished 28th. When the team was sold to Wayne Jesel the next season, Mears drove for them full-time, finishing 21st in points with two top-ten finishes.

=== Chip Ganassi Racing (2003–06) ===
To the surprise of many, he was selected by Chip Ganassi Racing to drive the No. 41 Target Dodge in 2003. In his rookie season, he finished 35th in the final points standings after failing to finish in the top ten in any race. Throughout 2003, Mears drove a number of ARCA races for Ganassi, winning three times, once at Michigan, and sweeping both Pocono races. He drove the No. 41 Cup car for two additional seasons and won two poles in 2004.

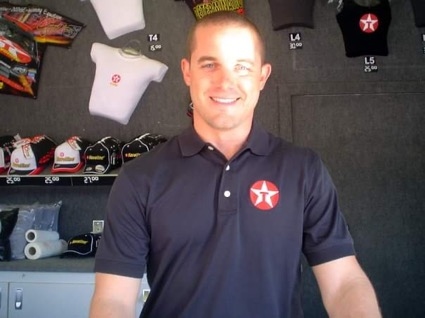
Casey Mears at his merchandise hauler at a 2006 Martinsville Speedway race.

Mears came close to quite a lot of victories during this period. He led late in the 2004 Sirius at the Glen but got passed with twelve laps to go and finished fourth. At Homestead in 2005, Mears controlled the final 100 laps of the Ford 400, but after a yellow flag with sixteen laps to go erased his one second lead, Mears had to make a pit stop, thus forfeiting the lead and with it, the win.

During the 2005 season, it was announced Mears would move to a separate car for Ganassi with Home123 sponsorship, with the No. 41 to be piloted by Reed Sorenson. The Home123 sponsorship fell through, and he instead moved to the No. 42 Texaco/Havoline Dodge for Ganassi, replacing the departing Jamie McMurray.

Mears started off 2006 with a then-best career finish of second, passing Ryan Newman at the line as Mears' future teammate Jimmie Johnson won the 2006 Daytona 500.

=== Hendrick Motorsports (2007–08) ===
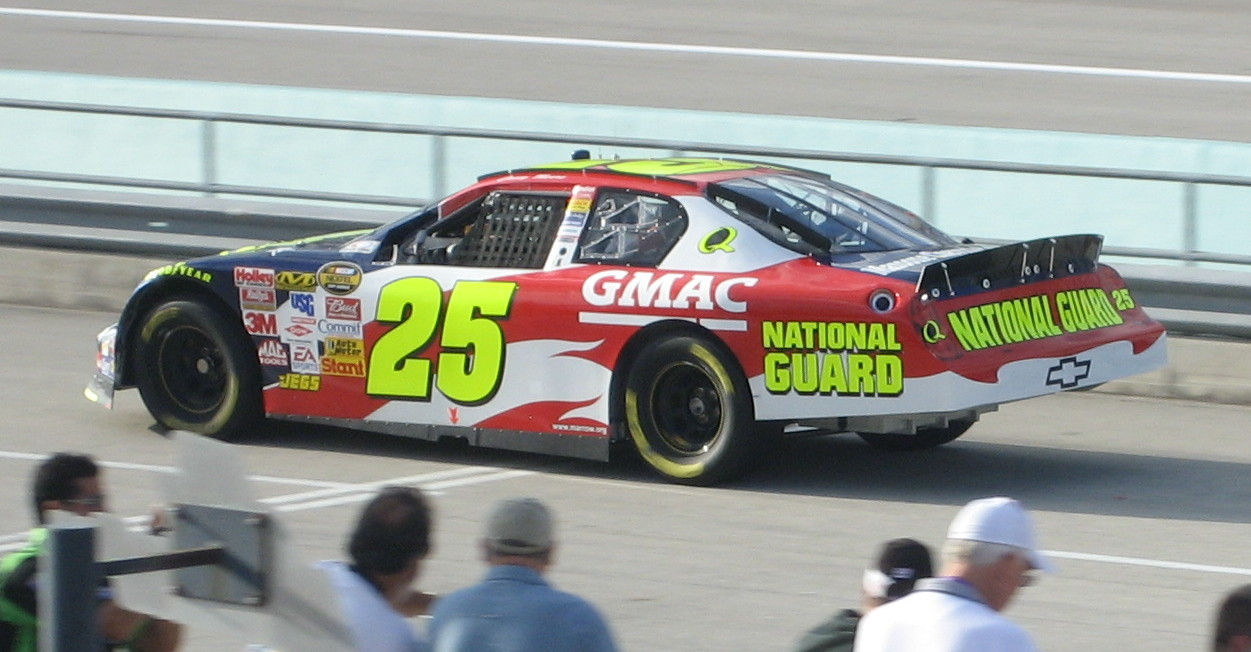
Mears' 2007 Cup car

On June 6, 2006, Mears announced that he was leaving Chip Ganassi Racing at the end of the season to join Hendrick Motorsports for the 2007 season, to replace the departing Brian Vickers. On July 8, 2006, he finally won his first NASCAR race, a Busch Series race at Chicagoland Speedway, coasting to the finish after running out of fuel.

For the 2007 season, Mears assumed driving duties for the No. 25 Hendrick Chevrolet, with co-primary sponsorships from the National Guard of the United States and GMAC. On May 27, 2007, he won the Coca-Cola 600 at Charlotte, his first (and only to date) career Nextel Cup victory. Once again, Mears secured the win with a fuel gamble, taking the lead with five laps remaining when most of the other lead lap cars stopped for fuel. Mears stretched his fuel to the finish, running out moments after the checkered flag.

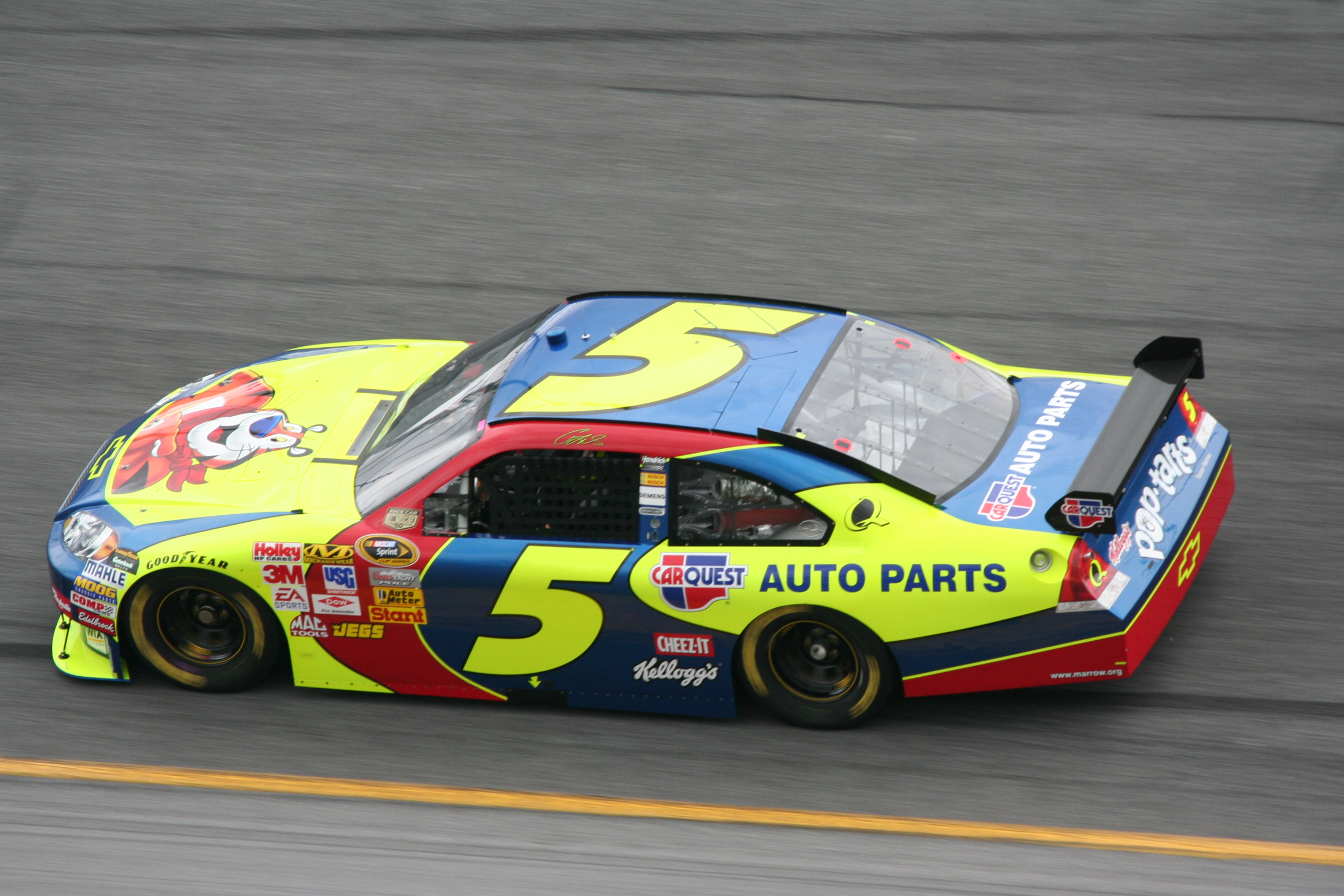
Mears' 2008 Cup car

In 2008, Mears moved to the Alan Gustafson-led No. 5 Kellogg's/Carquest Chevrolet Impala previously driven by Kyle Busch. After going winless, Mears was released by Hendrick and replaced by veteran Mark Martin.

=== Richard Childress Racing (2009) ===
On August 23, 2008, Mears was announced as the driver of Richard Childress Racing's No. 07 Jack Daniel's Chevrolet Impala SS. The previous driver of the car, Clint Bowyer, would drive the team's new No. 33 General Mills Chevrolet Impala SS. In his first season at RCR, Mears notched two top-ten finishes. After Mears struggled during the first seven races of the year, Richard Childress switched the crew chiefs for Harvick and Mears' cars, hoping for a better performance from the two drivers. The switch seemed to work for both parties.

On October 21, 2009, it was announced that Mears would be getting his third crew chief of the season, starting at Talladega. Todd Berrier would be moving to the No. 31 team in place of Scott Miller. Doug Randolph took over as the crew chief on the No. 07. This move was made primarily because the future of the No. 07 was uncertain, and Childress wanted to keep Berrier in the family. After the switch, Mears struggled with his new crew chief and had the best finish of nineteenth at Homestead. Mears was released by Richard Childress Racing following the 2009 season.

=== Various teams (2010) ===
It was announced on January 20, 2010, that Mears would drive the No. 90 Keyed-Up Motorsports Chevrolet. Mears failed to qualify for the 2010 Daytona 500, ending a starting streak of 252 consecutive races; this was Mears' first DNQ of his career. Mears also failed to qualify for Fontana, Las Vegas, and Atlanta. After qualifying for Martinsville was rained out, and the team did not qualify, Mears was released by the team. Following his release from Key Motorsports, Joe Gibbs announced that Mears would be on standby status while JGR driver Denny Hamlin recovered from ACL surgery; however, Hamlin did not require a replacement, and therefore Mears did not drive in either of the two races. Beginning on April 27, 2010, Mears briefly became the driver for Tommy Baldwin's No. 36 team. On May 13, 2010, Mears was announced as the temporary replacement driver for the No. 83 Team Red Bull at Dover, replacing a sick Brian Vickers.

During the June race at Michigan International Speedway, while racing near the back of the field, Mears wrecked his Team Red Bull teammate, Scott Speed. Speed went on to finish 28th, and Mears finished 36th. Following the race, Speed was critical of the incident, and Mears was soon replaced by Reed Sorenson. Mears returned to TBR beginning with the Lenox Industrial Tools 301 at New Hampshire Motor Speedway on June 27, 2010, where he finished 29th, only two laps down.

=== Germain Racing (2010–2016) ===
Mears stepped into his fourth car of the season at Atlanta in September, driving the No. 13 GEICO Toyota for Germain Racing. It was also announced in August 2010 that Mears would continue to drive this car for the remainder of the 2010 season and all of the 2011 season. Mears attempted to qualify for his initial Sprint Cup appearance with the team at Atlanta Motor Speedway for the September 5 Emory Healthcare 500.

The 2011 season started off with his second DNQ at the Daytona 500. Due to two engines failing him during Speedweeks, Mears was unable to secure a position on the starting grid. Germain Racing secured sponsorship from GEICO and Hard Rock Vodka for a combined 29 races. Mears finished 31st in driver points.

GEICO announced on January 6, 2012, that it signed a two-year deal with Mears and Germain. Germain also announced that the team was switching to Ford from Toyota for the 2012 season, gaining technical support from Roush Fenway Racing and engines from Roush-Yates. On August 24, 2012, Mears won the pole for the Irwin Tools Night Race due to the Friday qualifying session being rained out. Mears finished 30th in the final point standings.

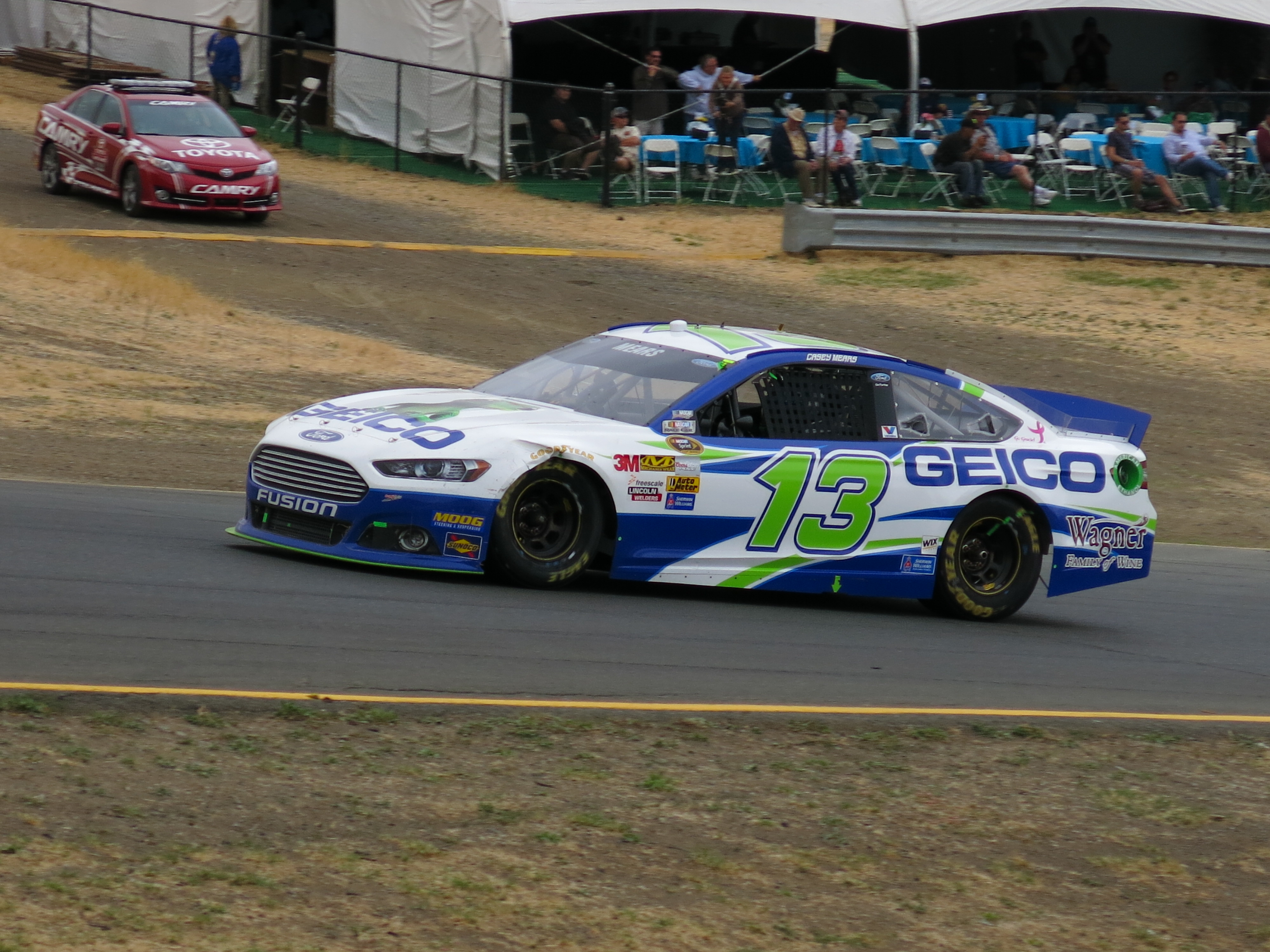
Mears' 2013 Cup car

On February 21, 2013, GEICO announced that they were sponsoring Mears and Germain full-time for the 2013 and 2014 seasons. Valvoline Next-Gen also sponsored Mears for two races. In the 2013 Coke Zero 400 at Daytona International Speedway, Mears recorded the team's best finish at an oval track, ninth. Mears finished 24th in points, his best since driving for RCR in 2009.

For 2014, Germain Racing partnered with Richard Childress Racing to field Chevrolets. Mears began the season on a high note with a tenth-place finish in the Daytona 500. At Richmond, Mears ran in the top-ten for part of the race, but got into a fist-fight with Marcos Ambrose, who was furious over a late racing incident. Two days later, Mears was fined $15,000 and put on probation for one month. During the 2014 season, Mears recorded fourteen top-twenty finishes, including three top-tens and one top-five. He finished 26th in points.

For 2015, Mears returned to Germain for what was to be the final year of both his and GEICO's contracts with the team. Mears finished sixth at Daytona and fifteenth at Atlanta to open the season.

On July 14, 2015, it was announced that Mears had signed a contract extension with Germain and GEICO for 2016. On November 12, 2015, GEICO announced that it had extended its partnership with Mears and Germain Racing through the 2018 season. Team owner Bob Germain confirmed that Mears had extended his contract with the team through 2018 as well.

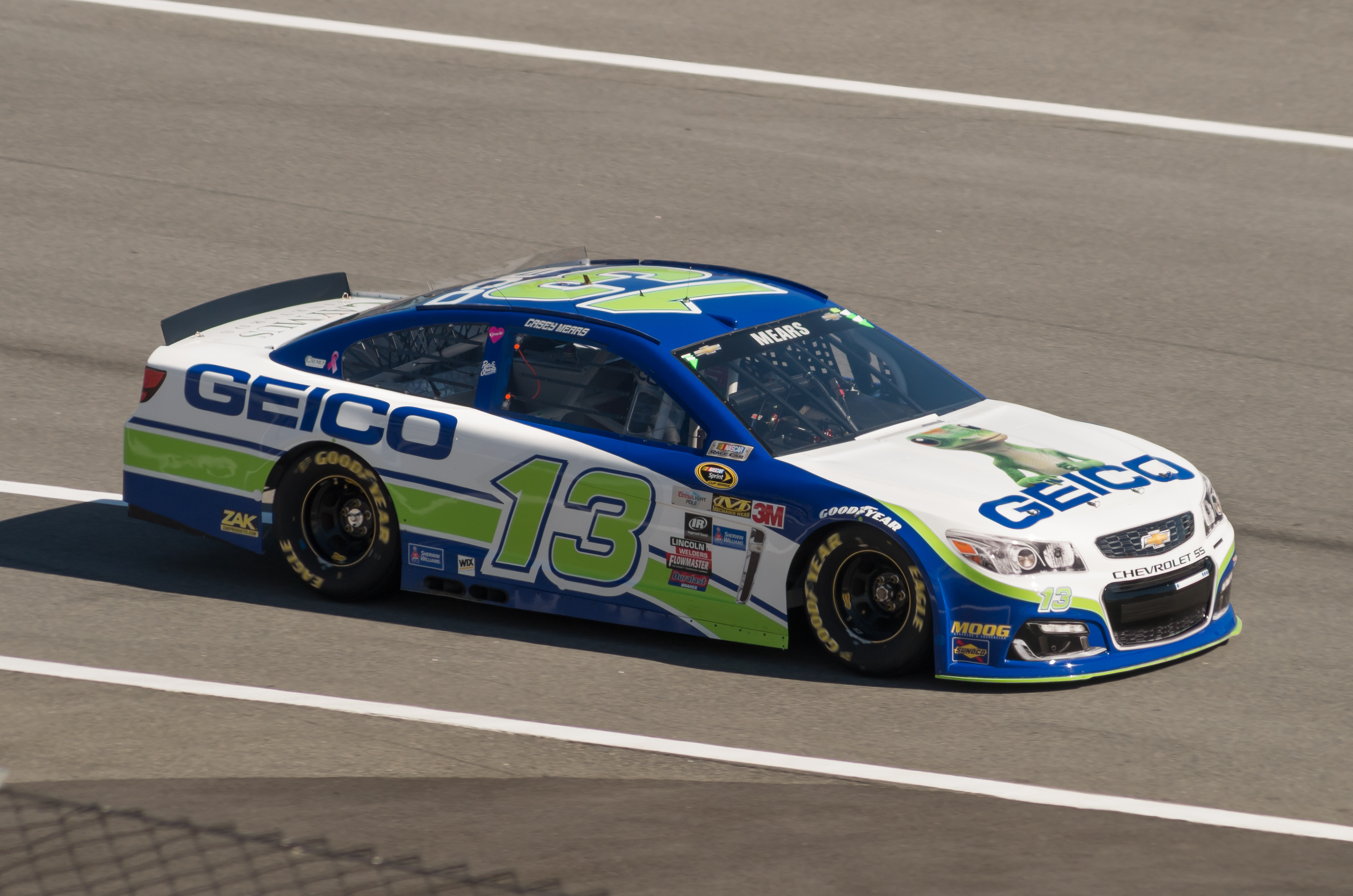
Mears' 2016 Cup car for Germain Racing

Mears had a rough 2016 season, finishing 32nd at Daytona after being caught speeding late in the race. Mears would finish better next week at Atlanta, finishing fourteenth. He was unlucky after being involved in a small accident, which ended Mears's contention for the win at Talladega. On November 28, 2016, Germain announced that Ty Dillon would replace Mears in the No. 13 starting in 2017.

=== Part-time racing (2017–present) ===
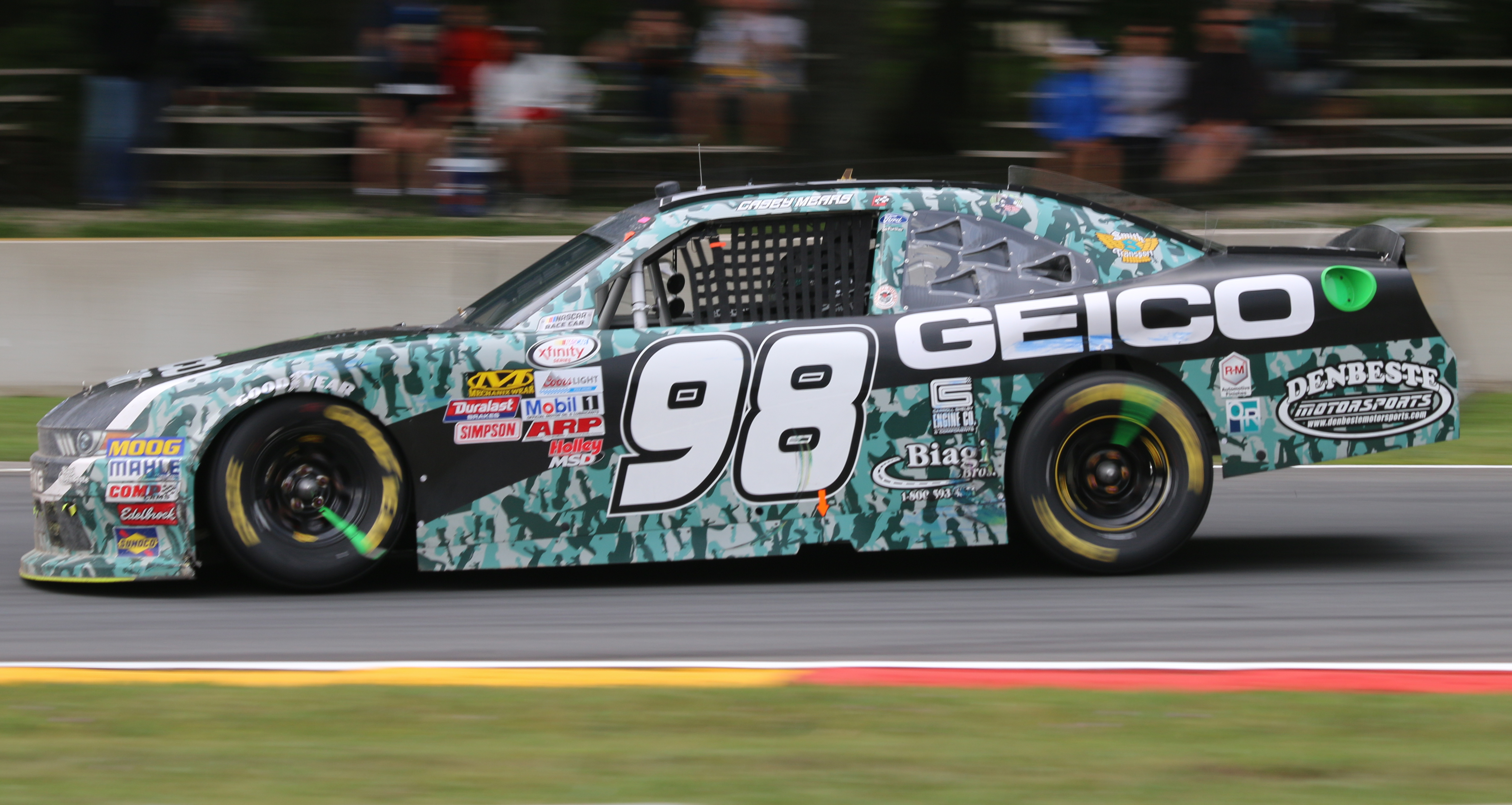
Mears racing in the NASCAR Xfinity Series in 2017 at Road America

On February 20, 2017, Mears announced via Twitter that he would drive the No. 98 Ford Mustang for Biagi-DenBeste Racing in the Xfinity Series for twelve races. After Aric Almirola's injury, his schedule was increased with two more races (Pocono and Daytona 2). Mears ended up running fourteen races in the No. 98 car with the best finish of ninth.

In 2019, Mears returned to the Cup Series with Germain, driving the No. 27 Chevrolet at the Daytona 500. After starting 40th, Mears finished in the same position when an early-race shunt with Parker Kligerman ended his day.

In 2023, Mears stated that he would like to be able to reach 500 career NASCAR Cup Series starts and would love to put together an eleven-race schedule. Due to Mears' friendship with Legacy Motor Club co-owner Jimmie Johnson, it was speculated he would join the organization, which was a Chevrolet team at the time.

Following a five-year absence, MBM Motorsports and their Cup entry "Garage 66" announced his return at the Cook Out 400. Mears would ultimately finish 35th, eleven laps off the pace. It was later announced he would return to the team for the Daytona summer race and the final three races of the season at Talladega, Martinsville, and Phoenix. At Daytona, Mears finished 29th, four laps down. At Talladega, Mears finished on the lead lap in 18th, the best finish of the year for Garage 66. At Martinsville, electrical issues caused Mears to fall out of the race in 33rd. At the season finale in Phoenix, Mears finished 36th, 35 laps down.

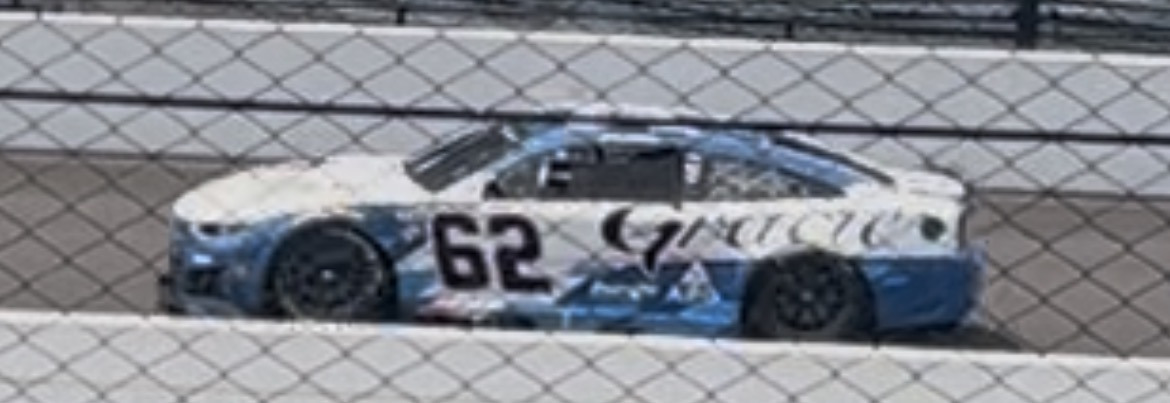
Mears' No. 62 at Indianapolis Motor Speedway in 2026

In 2026, Mears attempted to qualify for the Daytona 500 for Garage 66. He qualified 17th, making the race via his Duel 1 finish, where drove through a last-lap wreck in his Duel to make the field as top open entry, but finished 32nd, 5 laps down. He withdrew the following week from Atlanta.

On March 31, it was announced that he would race for Beard Motorsports in five races. He was originally scheduled to run Talladega in the Spring but failed to qualify. On May 27, it was announced that Pocono would be added to his schedule. He lost right-front wheel on lap 105, hitting the outside wall and having to DNF. He also completed at Indianapolis, finishing 35th. He plans to run at Daytona and Homestead—Miami to earn his 500th career Cup Series start.

== Grand-Am ==
In 2005, Mears teamed with Scott Dixon and Darren Manning in the Chip Ganassi Lexus Riley. They finished in 6th place. The following year, he won the 24 Hours of Daytona alongside Dixon and Dan Wheldon; they set a race record for the Daytona Prototype category, running 723 laps in 24 hours to score the win. Mears became the first-ever full-time NASCAR driver to win the Rolex 24 overall.

In 2009, Mears shared the No. 2 Gentleman Jack Pontiac-Crawford with Andy Wallace, Rob Finley, and Danica Patrick. They suffered electrical and handling issues during the race and finished eighth.

== Off-road racing ==
Following his family legacy, Mears entered desert racing in 2019 when he debuted in SCORE International's Baja 1000. He shared the No. 42 Ford Raptor trophy truck, which was built by the Geiser Brothers and sponsored by Axalta, with multi-time race class winner Doug Fortin. After dealing with engine issues brought upon by hitting a mud puddle, the Mears–Fortin duo finished 28th overall and twelfth in the Trophy Truck class.

Mears returned to the Baja 1000 in 2021, co-driving the No. 77 trophy truck with Robby Gordon. The opportunity arose following an encounter between the two when they were attending Roger Mears' Off-Road Motorsports Hall of Fame induction ceremony. Mears and Gordon were also among four former NASCAR race winners in the event alongside Brendan Gaughan and Justin Lofton. The No. 77 finished 13th overall and seventh in class.

=== Stadium Super Trucks ===
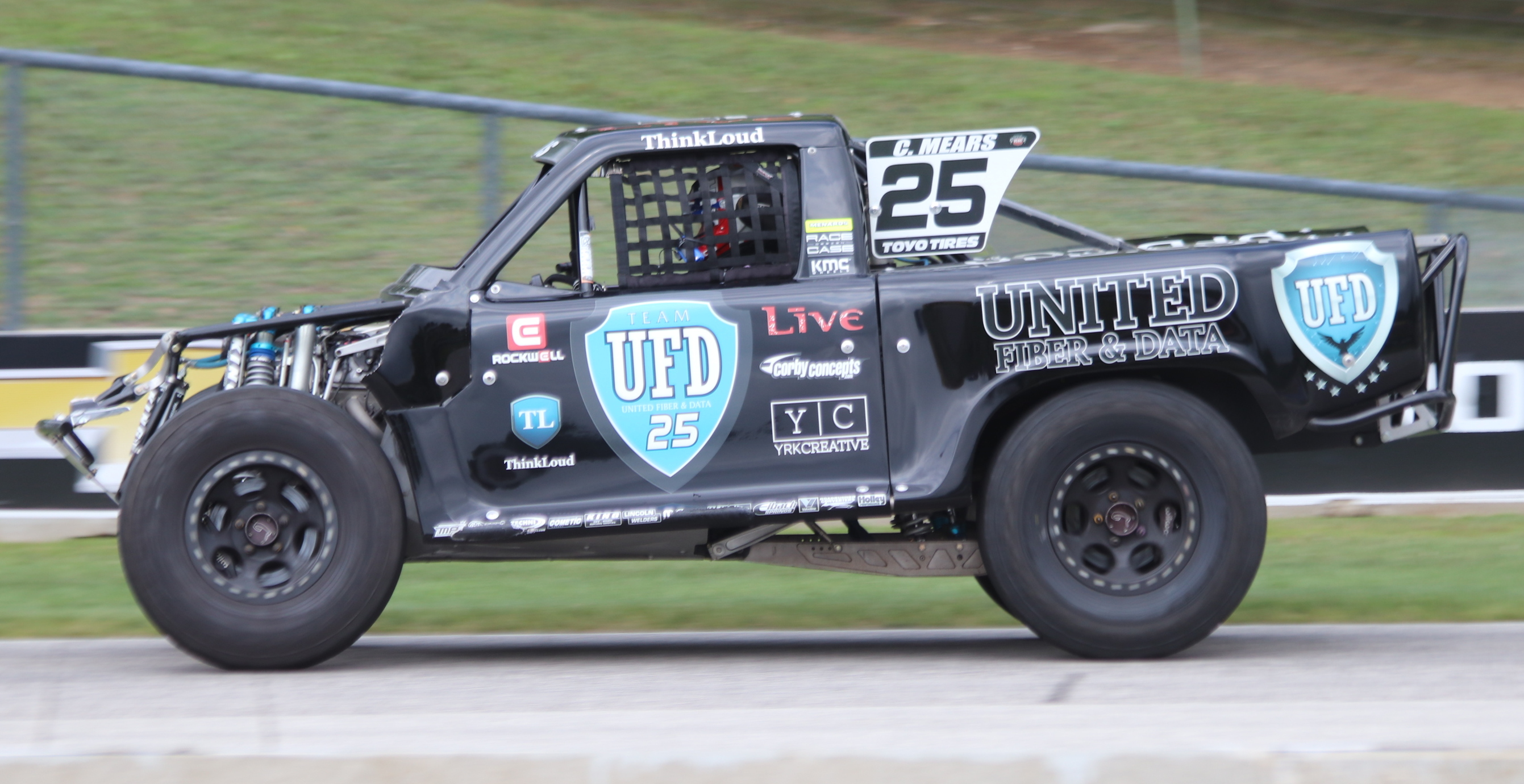
Mears racing in a Stadium Super Truck at Road America in 2018

In January 2017, Mears tested a Stadium Super Truck, a series owned by former NASCAR driver Robby Gordon; the Stadium Super Trucks are similar to the stadium trucks raced by Mears' father Roger, though they contain V8 engines instead of V6. In December, he made his series debut at the season-ending Lake Elsinore Diamond rounds. He failed to qualify for the first race's main event after finishing seventh in his heat race, but a fourth-place run in the following day's heat allowed him to compete in that evening's feature, in which he finished fifth.

The following year, Mears ran his first SST race at Road America, driving the No. 25 truck in place of Arie Luyendyk Jr. to sixth- and twelfth-place runs. He later raced in the series' rounds at Glen Helen Regional Park and the Race of Champions.

In 2019, Mears participated in the SST race weekend at Honda Indy Toronto. He later ran the Mid-Ohio Sports Car Course weekend, where he finished second in the Friday round.

== Motorsports career results ==
=== Racing career summary ===
| Season | Series | Team | Races | Wins | Top 5 | Top 10 | Points | Position |
|---|---|---|---|---|---|---|---|---|
| 1996 | Indy Lights | Team Mears | 1 | 0 | 0 | 1 | 5 | 24th |
| 1997 | Indy Lights | Team Mears | 13 | 0 | 0 | 2 | 9 | 23rd |
| 1998 | Indy Lights | Team Mears | 10 | 0 | 1 | 5 | 33 | 17th |
| 1999 | Indy Lights | Dorricott Racing | 12 | 0 | 8 | 11 | 116 | **2nd** |
| 2000 | Indy Lights | Dorricott Racing | 12 | 1 | 9 | 12 | 141 | **3rd** |
| 2000 | CART FedEx Championship Series | Team Rahal | 1 | 0 | 1 | 1 | 12 | 23rd |
| 2001 | ARCA Re/Max Series | LJ Racing | 1 | 0 | 0 | 1 | 185 | 122nd |
| 2001 | NASCAR Busch Series | Cicci-Welliver Racing | 1 | 0 | 0 | 0 | 79 | 116th |
| 2001 | CART FedEx Championship Series | Mo Nunn Racing | 4 | 0 | 0 | 1 | 7 | 28th |
| 2001 | Indy Racing League | Galles Racing | 3 | 0 | 0 | 0 | 36 | 31st |
| 2002 | ARCA Re/Max Series | Team Jesel | 1 | 0 | 0 | 0 | 80 | 159th |
| 2002 | NASCAR Busch Series | Team Jesel | 34 | 0 | 1 | 2 | 3148 | 21st |
| 2003 | ARCA Re/Max Series | Chip Ganassi Racing | 4 | 3 | 4 | 4 | 1005 | 26th |
| 2003 | NASCAR Winston Cup Series | Chip Ganassi Racing | 36 | 0 | 0 | 0 | 2638 | 35th |
| 2003 | NASCAR Busch Series | Braun Racing | 14 | 0 | 1 | 4 | 1525 | 34th |
| 2004 | NASCAR Busch Series | Phoenix Racing | 11 | 0 | 1 | 4 | 1511 | 34th |
| 2004 | NASCAR Busch Series | Chip Ganassi Racing | 2 | 0 | 1 | 2 | 1511 | 34th |
| 2004 | NASCAR Nextel Cup Series | Chip Ganassi Racing | 36 | 0 | 1 | 9 | 3690 | 22nd |
| 2005 | NASCAR Busch Series | Akins Motorsports | 1 | 0 | 0 | 0 | 85 | 116th |
| 2005 | NASCAR Nextel Cup Series | Chip Ganassi Racing | 36 | 0 | 3 | 9 | 3637 | 22nd |
| 2005 | Rolex Sports Car Series - DP | Chip Ganassi Racing | 1 | 0 | 0 | 1 | 25 | 66th |
| 2005 | 24 Hours of Daytona | Chip Ganassi Racing | 1 | 0 | 0 | 1 | N/A | 6th |
| 2006 | NASCAR Busch Series | Chip Ganassi Racing | 9 | 1 | 4 | 5 | 1200 | 38th |
| 2006 | NASCAR Nextel Cup Series | Chip Ganassi Racing | 36 | 0 | 2 | 8 | 3914 | 14th |
| 2006 | Rolex Sports Car Series - DP | Chip Ganassi Racing | 1 | 1 | 1 | 1 | 35 | 77th |
| 2006 | 24 Hours of Daytona | Chip Ganassi Racing | 1 | 1 | 1 | 1 | N/A | **1st** |
| 2007 | NASCAR Busch Series | Hendrick Motorsports | 19 | 0 | 7 | 14 | 2633 | 20th |
| 2007 | NASCAR Nextel Cup Series | Hendrick Motorsports | 36 | 1 | 5 | 10 | 3949 | 15th |
| 2008 | NASCAR Sprint Cup Series | Hendrick Motorsports | 36 | 0 | 1 | 6 | 3527 | 20th |
| 2009 | NASCAR Nationwide Series | Richard Childress Racing | 1 | 0 | 1 | 1 | 170 | 104th |
| 2009 | NASCAR Sprint Cup Series | Richard Childress Racing | 36 | 0 | 0 | 4 | 3759 | 21st |
| 2009 | Rolex Sports Car Series - DP | Childress-Howard Motorsports | 1 | 0 | 0 | 1 | 23 | 45th |
| 2009 | 24 Hours of Daytona | Childress-Howard Motorsports | 1 | 0 | 0 | 1 | N/A | 8th |
| 2010 | NASCAR Nationwide Series | Braun Racing | 1 | 0 | 0 | 0 | 70 | 127th |
| 2010 | NASCAR Sprint Cup Series | Keyed-Up Motorsports | 1 | 0 | 0 | 0 | 1573 | 36th |
| 2010 | NASCAR Sprint Cup Series | Tommy Baldwin Racing | 4 | 0 | 0 | 0 | 1573 | 36th |
| 2010 | NASCAR Sprint Cup Series | Team Red Bull | 4 | 0 | 0 | 0 | 1573 | 36th |
| 2010 | NASCAR Sprint Cup Series | Germain Racing | 12 | 0 | 0 | 0 | 1573 | 36th |
| 2011 | NASCAR Sprint Cup Series | Germain Racing | 35 | 0 | 0 | 0 | 541 | 31st |
| 2012 | NASCAR Sprint Cup Series | Germain Racing | 36 | 0 | 0 | 0 | 612 | 29th |
| 2013 | NASCAR Sprint Cup Series | Germain Racing | 36 | 0 | 0 | 1 | 719 | 24th |
| 2014 | NASCAR Sprint Cup Series | Germain Racing | 36 | 0 | 1 | 3 | 782 | 26th |
| 2015 | NASCAR Sprint Cup Series | Germain Racing | 36 | 0 | 0 | 1 | 754 | 23rd |
| 2016 | NASCAR Sprint Cup Series | Germain Racing | 36 | 0 | 0 | 0 | 556 | 28th |
| 2017 | NASCAR Xfinity Series | Biagi-DenBeste Racing | 14 | 0 | 0 | 2 | 242 | 28th |
| 2017 | Stadium Super Trucks | N/A | 1 | 0 | 1 | 1 | 29 | 22nd |
| 2018 | Stadium Super Trucks | N/A | 6 | 0 | 0 | 5 | 50 | 19th |
| 2019 | Monster Energy NASCAR Cup Series | Germain Racing | 1 | 0 | 0 | 0 | 1 | 40th |
| 2019 | Stadium Super Trucks | N/A | 6 | 0 | 2 | 6 | 100 | 10th |
| 2025 | NASCAR Craftsman Truck Series | MBM Motorsports | 1 | 0 | 0 | 0 | 13 | 62nd |
| 2025 | NASCAR Cup Series | Garage 66 | 5 | 0 | 0 | 0 | 0 | NC† |
| 2026 | NASCAR Cup Series | Garage 66 | 1 | 0 | 0 | 0 | 15 | 37th |
| 2026 | NASCAR Cup Series | Beard Motorsports | 5 | 0 | 0 | 0 | 15 | 37th |

^{†} As Mears was a guest driver, he was ineligible for championship points.

=== American open-wheel racing ===
(key) (Races in bold indicate pole position) (Races in italics indicate fastest lap)

==== Indy Lights ====
| Year | Team | 1 | 2 | 3 | 4 | 5 | 6 | 7 | 8 | 9 | 10 | 11 | 12 | 13 | 14 | Rank | Points |
|---|---|---|---|---|---|---|---|---|---|---|---|---|---|---|---|---|---|
| 1996 | Team Mears | MIA | LBH | NAZ | MIS | MIL | DET | POR | CLE; 8 | TOR | TRO | VAN | LS | | | **24th** | **5** |
| 1997 | Team Mears | MIA; 9 | LBH; 17 | NAZ; 13 | SAV; 13 | STL; 13 | MIL; 10 | DET; 15 | POR; 11 | TOR; 20 | TRO; 17 | VAN; 16 | LS; 19 | FON; 15 | | **23rd** | **9** |
| 1998 | Team Mears | MIA; 10 | LBH; 13 | NAZ; 3 | STL; 7 | MIL; 16 | DET; 19 | POR | CLE; 10 | TOR | MIS; 11 | TRO | VAN | LS; 21 | FON; 8 | **17th** | **33** |
| 1999 | Dorricott Racing | MIA; 5 | LBH; 5 | NAZ; 3 | MIL; 2 | POR; 4 | CLE; 8 | TOR; 8 | MIS; 2 | DET; 9 | CHI; 3 | LS; 5 | FON; 13 | | | **2nd** | **116** |
| 2000 | Dorricott Racing | LBH; 5 | MIL; 5 | DET; 3 | POR; 7 | MIS; 2 | CHI; 10 | MOH; 5 | VAN; 8 | **LS**; 2 | STL; 2 | **HOU**; 1 | FON; 4 | | | **3rd** | **141** |

==== CART ====
Champ Car results
| Year | Team | No. | Chassis | Engine | 1 | 2 | 3 | 4 | 5 | 6 | 7 | 8 | 9 | 10 | 11 | 12 | 13 | 14 | 15 | 16 | 17 | 18 | 19 | 20 | 21 | Rank | Points | Ref |
|---|---|---|---|---|---|---|---|---|---|---|---|---|---|---|---|---|---|---|---|---|---|---|---|---|---|---|---|---|
| 2000 | Team Rahal | 91 | Reynard 2Ki | Ford XF | MIA | LBH | RIO | MOT | NZR | MIL | DET | POR | CLE | TOR | MIS | CHI | MOH | ROA | VAN | LS | STL | HOU | SRF | FON; 4 | | **23rd** | **12** | |
| 2001 | Mo Nunn Racing | 66 | Reynard 01i | Honda HR-1 | MTY | LBH | TXS | NZR | MOT | MIL | DET | POR | CLE | TOR | MIS | CHI | MOH | ROA | VAN | LAU | ROC | HOU; 17 | LS; 11 | SRF; 26 | FON; 8 | **28th** | **7** | |

==== Indy Racing League ====
Indy Racing League results
| Year | Team | No. | Chassis | Engine | 1 | 2 | 3 | 4 | 5 | 6 | 7 | 8 | 9 | 10 | 11 | 12 | 13 | Rank | Points | Ref |
|---|---|---|---|---|---|---|---|---|---|---|---|---|---|---|---|---|---|---|---|---|
| 2001 | Galles Racing | 31 | G-Force | Oldsmobile | PHX; 20 | HMS; 11 | ATL; 23 | INDY; DNQ | TXS | PPI | RIR | KAN | NSH | KTY | STL | CHI | TX2 | **31st** | **36** | |

==== Indianapolis 500 ====
| Year | Chassis | Engine | Start | Finish | Team |
|---|---|---|---|---|---|
| 2001 | G-Force | Oldsmobile | DNQ | | Galles Racing |

=== NASCAR ===
(key) (Bold – Pole position awarded by qualifying time. Italics – Pole position earned by points standings or practice time. * – Most laps led.)

==== Cup Series ====
NASCAR Cup Series results
| Year | Team | No. | Make | 1 | 2 | 3 | 4 | 5 | 6 | 7 | 8 | 9 | 10 | 11 | 12 | 13 | 14 | 15 | 16 | 17 | 18 | 19 | 20 | 21 | 22 | 23 | 24 | 25 | 26 | 27 | 28 | 29 | 30 | 31 | 32 | 33 | 34 | 35 | 36 | NCSC | Pts | Ref |
|---|---|---|---|---|---|---|---|---|---|---|---|---|---|---|---|---|---|---|---|---|---|---|---|---|---|---|---|---|---|---|---|---|---|---|---|---|---|---|---|---|---|---|
| 2003 | Chip Ganassi Racing | 41 | Dodge | DAY; 27 | CAR; 30 | LVS; 15 | ATL; 23 | DAR; 34 | BRI; 32 | TEX; 27 | TAL; 40 | MAR; 36 | CAL; 34 | RCH; 28 | CLT; 35 | DOV; 40 | POC; 21 | MCH; 20 | SON; 26 | DAY; 25 | CHI; 34 | NHA; 16 | POC; 35 | IND; 29 | GLN; 32 | MCH; 41 | BRI; 21 | DAR; 35 | RCH; 41 | NHA; 17 | DOV; 36 | TAL; 37 | KAN; 24 | CLT; 42 | MAR; 17 | ATL; 28 | PHO; 42 | CAR; 33 | HOM; 27 | 35th | 2638 | |
| 2004 | Chip Ganassi Racing | 41 | Dodge | DAY; 14 | CAR; 21 | LVS; 7 | ATL; 34 | DAR; 15 | BRI; 36 | TEX; 7 | MAR; 37 | TAL; 8 | CAL; 8 | RCH; 32 | CLT; 7 | DOV; 28 | POC; 10 | MCH; 31 | SON; 7 | DAY; 11 | CHI; 15 | NHA; 26 | **POC**; 18 | **IND**; 26 | GLN; 4 | MCH; 20 | BRI; 30 | CAL; 29 | RCH; 35 | NHA; 29 | DOV; 24 | TAL; 8 | KAN; 31 | CLT; 20 | MAR; 29 | ATL; 13 | PHO; 34 | DAR; 26 | HOM; 26 | 22nd | 3690 | |
| 2005 | Chip Ganassi Racing | 41 | Dodge | DAY; 26 | CAL; 22 | LVS; 7 | ATL; 19 | BRI; 43 | MAR; 17 | TEX; 4 | PHO; 39 | TAL; 14 | DAR; 39 | RCH; 28 | CLT; 34 | DOV; 24 | POC; 18 | MCH; 21 | SON; 20 | DAY; 43 | CHI; 9 | NHA; 33 | POC; 21 | IND; 6 | GLN; 23 | MCH; 14 | BRI; 34 | CAL; 32 | RCH; 23 | NHA; 23 | DOV; 10 | TAL; 38 | KAN; 8 | CLT; 6 | MAR; 22 | ATL; 21 | TEX; 4 | PHO; 22 | HOM; 5 | 22nd | 3637 | |
| 2006 | Chip Ganassi Racing | 42 | Dodge | DAY; 2 | CAL; 7 | LVS; 9 | ATL; 21 | BRI; 25 | MAR; 27 | TEX; 14 | PHO; 20 | TAL; 20 | RCH; 17 | DAR; 17 | CLT; 23 | DOV; 21 | POC; 43 | MCH; 7 | SON; 20 | DAY; 7 | CHI; 25 | NHA; 21 | POC; 23 | IND; 23 | GLN; 35 | MCH; 16 | BRI; 17 | CAL; 14 | RCH; 11 | NHA; 21 | DOV; 22 | KAN; 2 | TAL; 30 | CLT; 12 | MAR; 6 | ATL; 28 | TEX; 7 | PHO; 26 | HOM; 32 | 14th | 3914 | |
| 2007 | Hendrick Motorsports | 25 | Chevy | DAY; 20 | CAL; 31 | LVS; 40 | ATL; 28 | BRI; 10 | MAR; 42 | TEX; 23 | PHO; 37 | TAL; 39 | RCH; 18 | DAR; 35 | CLT; 1 | DOV; 13 | POC; 4 | MCH; 4 | SON; 27 | NHA; 23 | DAY; 19 | **CHI**; 5 | IND; 35 | POC; 10 | GLN; 15 | MCH; 11 | BRI; 22 | CAL; 15 | RCH; 17 | NHA; 8 | DOV; 6 | KAN; 4 | TAL; 6 | CLT; 21 | MAR; 20 | ATL; 12 | TEX; 31 | PHO; 13 | HOM; 16 | 15th | 3949 | |
| 2008 | Hendrick Motorsports | 5 | Chevy | DAY; 35 | CAL; 42 | LVS; 13 | ATL; 17 | BRI; 42 | MAR; 7 | TEX; 22 | PHO; 11 | TAL; 7 | RCH; 36 | DAR; 35 | CLT; 29 | DOV; 17 | POC; 26 | MCH; 30 | SON; 5 | NHA; 7 | DAY; 34 | CHI; 33 | IND; 26 | POC; 22 | GLN; 19 | MCH; 18 | BRI; 41 | CAL; 26 | RCH; 11 | NHA; 37 | DOV; 15 | KAN; 14 | TAL; 14 | CLT; 29 | MAR; 6 | ATL; 12 | TEX; 14 | PHO; 36 | HOM; 8 | 20th | 3527 | |
| 2009 | Richard Childress Racing | 07 | Chevy | DAY; 15 | CAL; 24 | LVS; 30 | ATL; 16 | BRI; 24 | MAR; 21 | TEX; 21 | PHO; 20 | TAL; 16 | RCH; 9 | DAR; 36 | CLT; 33 | DOV; 9 | POC; 14 | MCH; 24 | SON; 23 | NHA; 11 | DAY; 34 | CHI; 28 | IND; 19 | POC; 25 | GLN; 15 | MCH; 6 | BRI; 13 | ATL; 25 | RCH; 30 | NHA; 13 | DOV; 17 | KAN; 15 | CAL; 11 | CLT; 7 | MAR; 18 | TAL; 25 | TEX; 21 | PHO; 27 | HOM; 19 | 21st | 3759 | |
| 2010 | Keyed-Up Motorsports | 90 | Chevy | DAY; DNQ | CAL; DNQ | LVS; DNQ | ATL; DNQ | BRI; 30 | MAR; DNQ | PHO | TEX | TAL | | | | | | | | | | | | | | | | | | | | | | | | | | | | 36th | 1573 | |
| 2010 | Tommy Baldwin Racing | 36 | Chevy | | | | | | | | | | RCH; 26 | DAR; DNQ | | | | | | NHA; 29 | DAY | CHI; 40 | IND; DNQ | POC; 36 | GLN | MCH; DNQ | | | | | | | | | | | | | | 36th | 1573 | |
| 2010 | Team Red Bull | 83 | Toyota | | | | | | | | | | | | DOV; 22 | CLT; 29 | POC; 23 | MCH; 36 | SON | | | | | | | | | | | | | | | | | | | | | 36th | 1573 | |
| 2010 | Germain Racing | 13 | Toyota | | | | | | | | | | | | | | | | | | | | | | | | BRI; 39 | ATL; 26 | RCH; 21 | NHA; 38 | DOV; 29 | KAN; 24 | CAL; 25 | CLT; DNQ | MAR; 40 | TAL; 24 | TEX; 26 | PHO; 24 | HOM; 33 | 36th | 1573 | |
| 2011 | Germain Racing | 13 | Toyota | DAY; DNQ | PHO; 18 | LVS; 25 | BRI; 37 | CAL; 29 | MAR; 36 | TEX; 26 | TAL; 22 | RCH; 28 | DAR; 30 | DOV; 23 | CLT; 23 | KAN; 37 | POC; 30 | MCH; 38 | SON; 34 | DAY; 32 | KEN; 25 | NHA; 38 | IND; 29 | POC; 36 | GLN; 20 | MCH; 37 | BRI; 23 | ATL; 28 | RCH; 17 | CHI; 29 | NHA; 42 | DOV; 35 | KAN; 42 | CLT; 32 | TAL; 17 | MAR; 12 | TEX; 25 | PHO; 26 | HOM; 26 | 31st | 541 | |
| 2012 | Germain Racing | 13 | Ford | DAY; 25 | PHO; 39 | LVS; 27 | BRI; 25 | CAL; 23 | MAR; 25 | TEX; 25 | KAN; 26 | RCH; 21 | TAL; 18 | DAR; 22 | CLT; 22 | DOV; 41 | POC; 35 | MCH; 20 | SON; 15 | KEN; 18 | DAY; 18 | NHA; 36 | IND; 34 | POC; 35 | GLN; 16 | MCH; 37 | BRI; 21 | ATL; 33 | RCH; 29 | CHI; 36 | NHA; 36 | DOV; 31 | TAL; 26 | CLT; 29 | KAN; 37 | MAR; 25 | TEX; 21 | PHO; 22 | HOM; 29 | 29th | 612 | |
| 2013 | Germain Racing | 13 | Ford | DAY; 29 | PHO; 14 | LVS; 29 | BRI; 15 | CAL; 15 | MAR; 16 | TEX; 31 | KAN; 34 | RCH; 30 | TAL; 24 | DAR; 37 | CLT; 23 | DOV; 16 | POC; 22 | MCH; 21 | SON; 16 | KEN; 18 | DAY; 9 | NHA; 36 | IND; 27 | POC; 24 | GLN; 12 | MCH; 25 | BRI; 33 | ATL; 22 | RCH; 26 | CHI; 30 | NHA; 25 | DOV; 24 | KAN; 21 | CLT; 31 | TAL; 27 | MAR; 21 | TEX; 33 | PHO; 27 | HOM; 28 | 24th | 719 | |
| 2014 | Germain Racing | 13 | Chevy | DAY; 10 | PHO; 14 | LVS; 28 | BRI; 27 | CAL; 15 | MAR; 24 | TEX; 28 | DAR; 18 | RCH; 19 | TAL; 14 | KAN; 26 | CLT; 24 | DOV; 25 | POC; 23 | MCH; 24 | SON; 13 | KEN; 20 | DAY; 4 | NHA; 38 | IND; 33 | POC; 12 | GLN; 15 | MCH; 17 | BRI; 26 | ATL; 22 | RCH; 31 | CHI; 26 | NHA; 22 | DOV; 27 | KAN; 28 | CLT; 31 | TAL; 10 | MAR; 37 | TEX; 18 | PHO; 35 | HOM; 20 | 26th | 782 | |
| 2015 | Germain Racing | 13 | Chevy | DAY; 6 | ATL; 15 | LVS; 25 | PHO; 20 | CAL; 23 | MAR; 15 | TEX; 27 | BRI; 36 | RCH; 30 | TAL; 28 | KAN; 19 | CLT; 24 | DOV; 27 | POC; 16 | MCH; 13 | SON; 38 | DAY; 11 | KEN; 23 | NHA; 16 | IND; 20 | POC; 28 | GLN; 18 | MCH; 42 | BRI; 23 | DAR; 29 | RCH; 21 | CHI; 20 | NHA; 18 | DOV; 24 | CLT; 18 | KAN; 23 | TAL; 31 | MAR; 17 | TEX; 26 | PHO; 22 | HOM; 42 | 23rd | 754 | |
| 2016 | Germain Racing | 13 | Chevy | DAY; 32 | ATL; 14 | LVS; 23 | PHO; 35 | CAL; 17 | MAR; 31 | TEX; 23 | BRI; 24 | RCH; 29 | TAL; 33 | KAN; 21 | DOV; 26 | CLT; 30 | POC; 24 | MCH; 32 | SON; 24 | DAY; 12 | KEN; 30 | NHA; 27 | IND; 24 | POC; 21 | GLN; 12 | BRI; 25 | MCH; 22 | DAR; 25 | RCH; 21 | CHI; 34 | NHA; 27 | DOV; 26 | CLT; 40 | KAN; 23 | TAL; 39 | MAR; 21 | TEX; 39 | PHO; 18 | HOM; 18 | 28th | 556 | |
| 2019 | Germain Racing | 27 | Chevy | DAY; 40 | ATL | LVS | PHO | CAL | MAR | TEX | BRI | RCH | TAL | DOV | KAN | CLT | POC | MCH | SON | CHI | DAY | KEN | NHA | POC | GLN | MCH | BRI | DAR | IND | LVS | RCH | ROV | DOV | TAL | KAN | MAR | TEX | PHO | HOM | 40th | 1 | |
| 2025 | Garage 66 | 66 | Ford | DAY | ATL | COA | PHO | LVS | HOM | MAR; 35 | DAR | BRI | TAL | TEX | KAN | CLT | NSH | MCH | MXC | POC | ATL | CSC | SON | DOV | IND | IOW | GLN | RCH | DAY; 29 | DAR | GTW | BRI | NHA | KAN | ROV | LVS | TAL; 18 | MAR; 33 | PHO; 36 | 49th | 0^{1} | |
| 2026 | Garage 66 | 66 | Ford | DAY; 32 | ATL; Wth | COA | PHO | LVS | DAR | MAR | BRI | KAN | | | | | | | | | | | | | | | | | | | | | | | | | | | | 37th | 15 | |
| 2026 | Beard Motorsports | 62 | Chevy | | | | | | | | | | TAL; DNQ | TEX | GLN | CLT | NSH | MCH | POC; 36 | COR | SON | CHI | ATL | NWS | IND; 35 | IOW | RCH | NHA | DAY; 37 | DAR | GTW | BRI | KAN | LVS | CLT | PHO | TAL; 40 | MAR | HOM; 37 | 37th | 15 | |

===== Daytona 500 =====
| Year | Team | Manufacturer | Start | Finish |
|---|---|---|---|---|
| 2003 | Chip Ganassi Racing | Dodge | 29 | 27 |
| 2004 | Chip Ganassi Racing | Dodge | 25 | 14 |
| 2005 | Chip Ganassi Racing | Dodge | 29 | 26 |
| 2006 | Chip Ganassi Racing | Dodge | 14 | 2 |
| 2007 | Hendrick Motorsports | Chevrolet | 17 | 20 |
| 2008 | Hendrick Motorsports | Chevrolet | 9 | 35 |
| 2009 | Richard Childress Racing | Chevrolet | 25 | 15 |
| 2010 | Keyed-Up Motorsports | Chevrolet | DNQ | |
| 2011 | Germain Racing | Toyota | DNQ | |
| 2012 | Germain Racing | Ford | 36 | 25 |
| 2013 | Germain Racing | Ford | 17 | 29 |
| 2014 | Germain Racing | Chevrolet | 28 | 10 |
| 2015 | Germain Racing | Chevrolet | 41 | 6 |
| 2016 | Germain Racing | Chevrolet | 32 | 32 |
| 2019 | Germain Racing | Chevrolet | 40 | 40 |
| 2026 | Garage 66 | Ford | 17 | 32 |

==== Xfinity Series ====
NASCAR Xfinity Series results
| Year | Team | No. | Make | 1 | 2 | 3 | 4 | 5 | 6 | 7 | 8 | 9 | 10 | 11 | 12 | 13 | 14 | 15 | 16 | 17 | 18 | 19 | 20 | 21 | 22 | 23 | 24 | 25 | 26 | 27 | 28 | 29 | 30 | 31 | 32 | 33 | 34 | 35 | NXSC | Pts | Ref |
|---|---|---|---|---|---|---|---|---|---|---|---|---|---|---|---|---|---|---|---|---|---|---|---|---|---|---|---|---|---|---|---|---|---|---|---|---|---|---|---|---|---|
| 2001 | Cicci-Welliver Racing | 66 | Chevy | DAY | CAR | LVS | ATL | DAR | BRI | TEX | NSH | TAL | CAL | RCH | NHA | NZH | CLT | DOV | KEN | MLW | GLN | CHI | GTW | PPR | IRP | MCH | BRI | DAR | RCH | DOV | KAN | CLT | MEM | PHO | CAR | HOM; 28 | | | 116th | 79 | |
| 2002 | Team Jesel | 66 | Dodge | DAY; 23 | CAR; 23 | LVS; 18 | DAR; 39 | BRI; 23 | TEX; 38 | NSH; 23 | TAL; 5 | CAL; 29 | RCH; 23 | NHA; 17 | NZH; 15 | CLT; 23 | DOV; 36 | NSH; 10 | KEN; 20 | MLW; 19 | DAY; 16 | CHI; 38 | GTW; 15 | PPR; 25 | IRP; 25 | MCH; 34 | BRI; 40 | DAR; 12 | RCH; 30 | DOV; 22 | KAN; 29 | CLT; 27 | MEM; 23 | ATL; 23 | CAR; 34 | PHO; 15 | HOM; 12 | | 21st | 3148 | |
| 2003 | Braun Racing | 19 | Dodge | DAY | CAR | LVS | DAR | BRI | TEX | TAL | NSH | CAL | RCH | GTW | NZH | CLT; 15 | DOV; 28 | NSH | KEN | MLW | DAY | **CHI**; 4 | NHA | PPR | IRP | MCH; 7 | BRI; 41 | DAR; 9 | RCH; 31 | DOV; 28 | KAN; 12 | CLT; 15 | MEM | ATL; 20 | PHO; 21 | CAR; 21 | HOM; 8 | | 34th | 1525 | |
| 2004 | Phoenix Racing | 1 | Dodge | DAY | CAR | LVS | DAR | BRI | TEX | NSH | TAL | CAL | GTW | RCH | NZH | CLT | DOV | NSH | KEN | MLW | DAY; 7 | CHI | NHA; 20 | PPR | IRP | MCH; 4 | BRI; 35 | | RCH; 31 | DOV; 19 | KAN; 8 | | MEM | ATL; 42 | PHO; 20 | DAR; 6 | **HOM**; 26 | | 34th | 1511 | |
| 2004 | Chip Ganassi Racing | 41 | Dodge | | | | | | | | | | | | | | | | | | | | | | | | | **CAL**; 2 | | | | **CLT**; 7^{*} | | | | | | | 34th | 1511 | |
| 2005 | Akins Motorsports | 38 | Dodge | DAY | CAL | MXC | LVS | ATL | NSH | BRI | TEX | PHO | TAL; 26 | DAR | RCH | CLT | DOV | NSH | KEN | MLW | DAY | CHI | NHA | PPR | GTW | IRP | GLN | MCH | BRI | CAL | RCH | DOV | KAN | CLT | MEM | TEX | PHO | HOM | 116th | 85 | |
| 2006 | Chip Ganassi Racing | 42 | Dodge | DAY | CAL; 40 | MXC | LVS | ATL; 16 | BRI | TEX; 3 | NSH | PHO; 8 | TAL | RCH | DAR | CLT; 4 | DOV | NSH | KEN | MLW | DAY | CHI; 1 | NHA | MAR | GTW | IRP | GLN | MCH; 2 | BRI | CAL; 16 | RCH | DOV | KAN | CLT; 26 | MEM | TEX | PHO | HOM | 38th | 1200 | |
| 2007 | Hendrick Motorsports | 24 | Chevy | DAY; DNQ | CAL; 2 | MXC | LVS; 42 | ATL; 5 | BRI | NSH | TEX; 4 | PHO; 7 | TAL; 3^{*} | RCH; 7 | DAR; 9 | CLT; 2 | DOV; 4 | NSH | KEN | MLW | NHA; 10 | DAY; 8 | CHI; 13 | GTW | IRP | CGV | | MCH; 9 | BRI; 19 | CAL | RCH | DOV | KAN; 3 | CLT | MEM | TEX; 15 | PHO | HOM; 22 | 20th | 2633 | |
| 2007 | Hendrick Motorsports | 5 | Chevy | | | | | | | | | | | | | | | | | | | | | | | | GLN; 8 | | | | | | | | | | | | 20th | 2633 | |
| 2009 | Richard Childress Racing | 29 | Chevy | DAY | CAL | LVS | BRI | TEX | NSH | PHO | TAL | RCH | DAR | CLT | DOV | NSH | KEN | MLW | NHA | DAY | CHI | GTW | IRP | IOW | GLN | MCH | BRI | CGV | ATL | RCH | DOV | KAN | CAL | CLT | MEM | TEX; 2 | PHO | HOM | 104th | 170 | |
| 2010 | Braun Racing | 10 | Toyota | DAY | CAL | LVS | BRI | NSH | PHO; 31 | TEX | TAL | RCH | DAR | DOV | CLT | NSH | KEN | ROA | NHA | DAY | CHI | GTW | IRP | IOW | GLN | MCH | BRI | CGV | ATL | RCH | DOV | KAN | CAL | CLT | GTW | TEX | PHO | HOM | 127th | 70 | |
| 2017 | Biagi-DenBeste Racing | 98 | Ford | DAY | ATL | LVS | PHO | CAL; 14 | TEX; 38 | BRI | RCH; 9 | TAL | CLT; 21 | DOV | POC; 21 | MCH | IOW | DAY; 34 | KEN; 15 | NHA | IND | IOW | GLN; 25 | MOH; 32 | BRI | ROA; 9 | DAR | RCH; 25 | CHI | KEN | DOV; 18 | CLT | KAN | TEX | PHO; 12 | HOM; 11 | | | 28th | 242 | |

==== Craftsman Truck Series ====
NASCAR Craftsman Truck Series results
| Year | Team | No. | Make | 1 | 2 | 3 | 4 | 5 | 6 | 7 | 8 | 9 | 10 | 11 | 12 | 13 | 14 | 15 | 16 | 17 | 18 | 19 | 20 | 21 | 22 | 23 | 24 | 25 | NCTC | Pts | Ref |
|---|---|---|---|---|---|---|---|---|---|---|---|---|---|---|---|---|---|---|---|---|---|---|---|---|---|---|---|---|---|---|---|
| 2025 | MBM Motorsports | 69 | Ford | DAY | ATL | LVS | HOM | MAR | BRI | CAR | TEX | KAN | NWS | CLT | NSH | MCH | POC | LRP | IRP | GLN | RCH | DAR | BRI | NHA | ROV | TAL | MAR; 24 | PHO | 62nd | 13 | |

^{*} Season still in progress
^{1} Ineligible for series points

=== ARCA Re/Max Series ===
(key) (Bold – Pole position awarded by qualifying time. Italics – Pole position earned by points standings or practice time. * – Most laps led.)

ARCA Re/Max Series results
| Year | Team | No. | Make | 1 | 2 | 3 | 4 | 5 | 6 | 7 | 8 | 9 | 10 | 11 | 12 | 13 | 14 | 15 | 16 | 17 | 18 | 19 | 20 | 21 | 22 | 23 | 24 | 25 | ARMC | Pts | Ref |
|---|---|---|---|---|---|---|---|---|---|---|---|---|---|---|---|---|---|---|---|---|---|---|---|---|---|---|---|---|---|---|---|
| 2001 | LJ Racing | 91 | Pontiac | DAY | NSH | WIN | SLM | GTW | KEN | CLT | KAN | MCH | POC | MEM | GLN | KEN | MCH | POC | NSH | ISF | CHI | DSF | SLM | TOL | BLN | CLT | TAL; 9 | ATL | 122nd | 185 | |
| 2002 | Team Jesel | 36 | Pontiac | DAY; 30 | ATL | NSH | SLM | KEN | CLT | KAN | POC | MCH | TOL | SBO | KEN | BLN | POC | NSH | ISF | WIN | DSF | CHI | SLM | TAL | CLT | | | | 159th | 80 | |
| 2003 | Chip Ganassi Racing | 77 | Dodge | DAY | ATL | NSH | SLM | TOL | KEN | CLT; 4 | BLN | KAN | **MCH**; 1* | LER | **POC**; 1* | POC; 1 | NSH | ISF | WIN | DSF | CHI | SLM | TAL | CLT | SBO | | | | 26th | 1005 | |

=== 24 Hours of Daytona ===
(key)

24 Hours of Daytona results
| Year | Class | No | Team | Car | Co-drivers | Laps | Position | Class Pos. |
|---|---|---|---|---|---|---|---|---|
| 2005 | DP | 03 | (United States) Target Chip Ganassi Racing | Lexus Riley DP | (New Zealand) Scott Dixon (United Kingdom) Darren Manning | 694 | 6 | 6 |
| 2006 | DP | 02 | (United States) Target Chip Ganassi Racing | Lexus Riley DP | (New Zealand) Scott Dixon (United Kingdom) Dan Wheldon | 734 | 1 | 1 |
| 2009 | DP | 2 | (United States) Childress-Howard Motorsports | Pontiac Crawford DP08 | (United Kingdom) Andy Wallace (United States) Rob Finlay (United States) Danica Patrick | 702 | 8 | 8 |

=== Stadium Super Trucks ===
(key) (Bold – Pole position. Italics – Fastest qualifier. * – Most laps led.)

Stadium Super Trucks results
| Year | 1 | 2 | 3 | 4 | 5 | 6 | 7 | 8 | 9 | 10 | 11 | 12 | 13 | 14 | 15 | 16 | 17 | 18 | 19 | 20 | 21 | 22 | SSTC | Pts | Ref |
|---|---|---|---|---|---|---|---|---|---|---|---|---|---|---|---|---|---|---|---|---|---|---|---|---|---|
| 2017 | ADE | ADE | ADE | STP | STP | LBH | LBH | PER | PER | PER | DET | DET | TEX | TEX | HID | HID | HID | BEI | GLN | GLN | ELS; DNQ | ELS; 5 | 22nd | 29 | |
| 2018 | ELS | ADE | ADE | ADE | LBH | LBH | PER | PER | DET | DET | TEX | TEX | ROA; 6^{†} | ROA; 12^{†} | SMP | SMP | HLN; 7 | HLN; 10 | MXC; 8 | MXC; 9 | | | 19th | 50 | |
| 2019 | COA | COA | TEX | TEX | LBH | LBH | **TOR**; 6 | TOR; 7 | MOH | MOH | MOH; 2* | MOH; 5 | ROA | ROA | ROA | POR; 7 | POR; 7 | SRF | SRF | | | | 10th | 100 | |
^{†} – Replaced Arie Luyendyk Jr., points went to Luyendyk
