= 2001 Marlboro 500 =

Coordinates: 34.08858°N 117.50000°W

(United States) 2001 Marlboro 500
Race details
- Race 21 of 21 in the 2001 CART season
- Date: November 4, 2001
- Official name: Marlboro 500 Presented by Toyota
- Location: California Speedway, Fontana, California
- Course: Permanent racing facility 2.029 mi / 3.265 km
- Distance: 220 laps 446.38 mi / 718.37 km

Pole position
- Driver: (Canada) Alex Tagliani (Forsythe Racing)
- Time: 31.935

Fastest lap
- Driver: (Italy) Max Papis (Team Rahal)
- Time: 32.347 (on lap 204 of 220)

Podium
- First: (Brazil) Cristiano da Matta (Newman/Haas Racing)
- Second: (Italy) Max Papis (Team Rahal)
- Third: (Canada) Alex Tagliani (Forsythe Racing)

The 2001 Marlboro 500 was a Championship Auto Racing Teams (CART) motor race held on November 4, 2001, at the California Speedway, in Fontana, California. It was the 21st and final round of the 2001 CART season and the fifth annual edition of the Marlboro 500 at California Speedway. The 220-lap race was won by Newman/Haas Racing driver Cristiano da Matta who started from second position. Max Papis finished second for Team Rahal and Forsythe Racing driver Alex Tagliani came in third.

Tagliani won the pole position but was passed by Bryan Herta on the first lap. Papis moved into the lead on the fifth lap and remained there for 54 laps more than any other driver during the course of the race. Most drivers chose to run in front of the field but not take the lead because they wanted to conserve fuel. The race was reduced from its original distance of 250 laps to 220 because of fading daylight and the event was delayed by morning rain. Da Matta held off Papis at the start-finish line to win after a caution period for a crash involving Scott Dixon ended competitive racing in the event.

There were eight cautions and a CART record-breaking 73 lead changes by 19 different drivers during the course of the race. It was da Matta's third (and final) victory of the season, his first in Fontana, and the fourth of his career. Seventh-place finisher Michael Andretti moved in front of Hélio Castroneves to secure third position after the latter retired with an engine failure. 75,000 people attended the event.

== Background ==
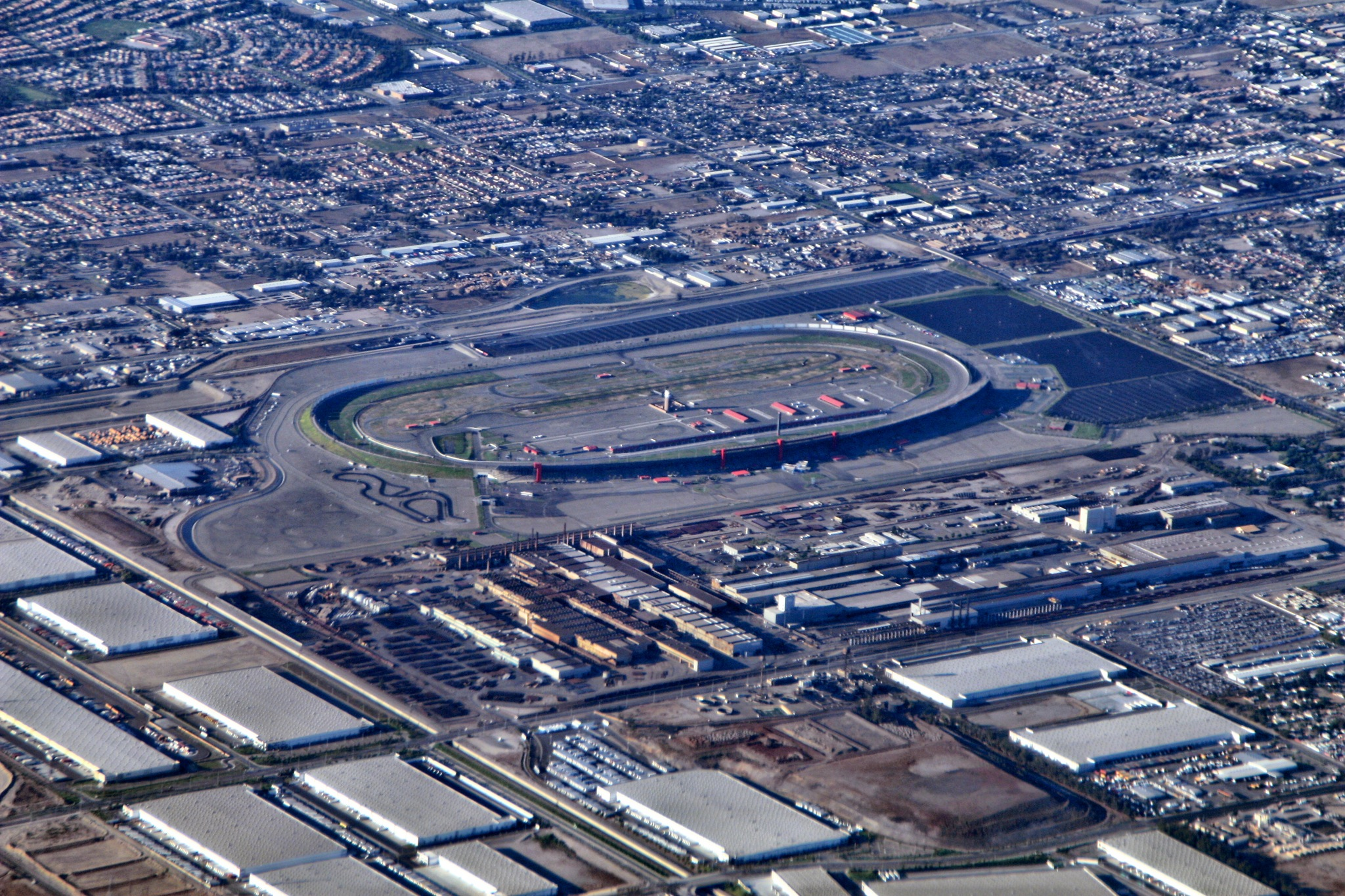
California Speedway (now called Auto Club Speedway), where the race was held.

The Marlboro 500 was confirmed as part of CART's 2001 series schedule in August 2000. It was the fifth consecutive year the race was held in the series, and the final race of the season to be held in the United States. The Marlboro 500 was the 21st and final scheduled race for 2001 by CART, and was held on November 4 at the 2 mi (3.2 km) D-shaped California Speedway oval track, in Fontana, California. It was scheduled to last 250 laps over a distance of 500 mi (800 km).

Prior to the race, Team Penske driver Gil de Ferran had secured the championship at the previous round of the season (the Honda Indy 300) and held a 28-point lead over second-place driver Kenny Bräck. Hélio Castroneves and Michael Andretti were tied on 141 points in third place, and Cristiano da Matta was fifth on 120. Honda had already secured the Manufacturers' Championship beforehand and had a points total of 332. Toyota was second on 288, eight ahead of Ford Cosworth in third. Christian Fittipaldi was the event's defending champion from the 2000 edition.

De Ferran was confident that he could be competitive and achieve a good result without needing to worry about the championship. Da Matta felt his team had learnt more from the series previous race on a superspeedway which he believed would help him in California where he wanted to win. Having moved from 16th to eighth in the points standings with a victory in Laguna Seca and a second-place finish in Germany, Papis stated that he was focused on the race and hoped to clinch his first victory in a 500-mile event despite having not managed to finish a race on a superspeedway in 2001. Bruno Junqueira was excited to race in Fontana and hoped that he could clinch his second victory of the year.

== Practice ==
There were three practice sessions preceding Sunday's race: two on Friday and one on Saturday. The first session ran for 105 minutes, the second 75 minutes, and the third 60 minutes. Conditions were foggy for the first session which cleared later in the day. Junqueira was fastest in the first practice session with a time of 31.948 seconds; Tora Takagi, Paul Tracy, Kenny Bräck, da Matta, Patrick Carpentier, Papis, Tony Kanaan, Michel Jourdain Jr. and Roberto Moreno rounded out the session's top ten drivers. Five yellow caution flags came out: the first was for Carpentier whose engine failed while entering the fourth turn, the second for Bräck after a heavy collision with the turn four outside wall. Adrián Fernández's engine failed which littered debris onto the track, Papis spun on the exit of the frontstretch and damaged the rear of his car when he hit the pit road exit barrier. A track inspection was necessitated after Castroneves' car leaked fluid onto the circuit.

In the second practice session, Bräck set the fastest time of the day with a lap of 31:676 seconds, ahead of Junqueira, Tracy. Tagliani, Memo Gidley, Shinji Nakano, Carpentier, Bryan Herta, Fernández and da Matta. The session was temporarily stopped when a track inspection was required after Fernández's right-rear tire blew, and Jourdain's engine failed after exiting turn four. Bräck was fastest in the third practice session with a lap of 31.219 seconds; Papis, da Matta, Kanaan, Tracy, Junqueira, Fittipaldi, Herta, Tagliani and Gidley completed the top ten ahead of qualifying. A track inspection stopped the session for eight minutes after several teams reported that their cars had sustained cut tires.

== Qualifying ==
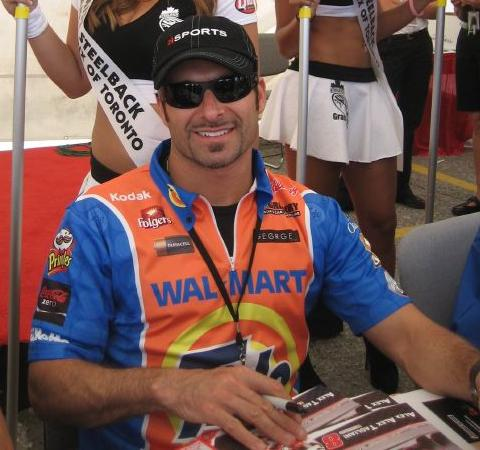
Alex Tagliani (pictured in 2007) had the third pole position of his career.

Saturday afternoon's one hour qualifying session began with the slowest driver in the weekend's combined practice sessions going out first with the quickest competitor heading out last. Each driver was restricted to two timed laps. Conditions for the one-hour session were sunny and warm. Tagliani clinched his second pole position of the season and the third of his career with a time of 31.935 seconds. He was joined on the grid's front row by da Matta. Bräck qualified third, Herta fourth and Fittipaldi fifth after he made changes to make his car go faster. Papis, Jourdain, Junqueira, Jimmy Vasser and Scott Dixon rounded out the top ten fastest qualifiers. After completing his lap, Jourdain switched off his engine when smoke emitted from his car's left-hand side leaving turn two and qualifying was temporarily stopped to allow course officials to extract his car. Gidley was the fastest driver not to qualify in the top ten; his fastest time was five-tenths of a second off Tagliani's pace. Nakano, Andretti, Kanaan, Maurício Gugelmin, Oriol Servià, Tracy, Alex Barron and Takagi completed the top-20.

Casey Mears, 21st, had his car lose power on his second warm-up lap after exiting the fourth turn and stopped in turn two; he was allowed one attempt to record a timed lap as a result. Dario Franchitti and Moreno qualified in the 22nd and 23rd positions, while Castroneves took 24th. Carpentier, who qualified in 25th, was observed speeding after he exited pit road and was limited to one lap time. On his run, he went up onto the track's dirty side in turn two and removed his foot from the accelerator pedal. Fernández qualified at the back of the grid in 26th position and switched off his engine on the backstretch while on his second warm-up lap and stopped at the bottom of turn three. After qualifying, Tagliani said: "The car is very fast, the team was very quick earlier this year at Michigan and we're looking good right now. We didn't expect to qualify that fast actually, but the car was free and it was great. I think we have a good shot to stay up front with that time."

=== Qualifying classification ===
Qualifying results
Pos	No.	Driver	Team	Time	Speed	Gap
1	33	Alex Tagliani (CAN)	Forsythe Racing	31.935	228.727	—
2	6	Cristiano da Matta (BRA)	Newman/Haas Racing	32.009	228.198	+0.074
3	8	Kenny Bräck (SWE)	Team Rahal	32.016	227.835	+0.125
4	77	Bryan Herta (USA)	Forsythe Racing	32.100	227.551	+0.165
5	11	Christian Fittipaldi (BRA)	Newman/Haas Racing	32.117	227.431	+0.178
6	7	Max Papis (ITA)	Team Rahal	32.124	227.381	+0.189
7	16	Michel Jourdain Jr. (MEX)	Bettenhausen Racing	32.220	226.704	+0.285
8	4	Bruno Junqueira (BRA)	Chip Ganassi Racing	32.270	226.353	+0.335
9	40	Jimmy Vasser (USA)	Patrick Racing	32.296	226.170	+0.361
10	18	Scott Dixon (NZL)	PacWest Racing	32.330	225.933	+0.395
11	12	Memo Gidley (USA)	Chip Ganassi Racing	32.349	225.800	+0.414
12	52	Shinji Nakano (JPN)	Fernández Racing	32.356	225.751	+0.421
13	39	Michael Andretti (USA)	Team Motorola	32.397	225.465	+0.462
14	55	Tony Kanaan (BRA)	Mo Nunn Racing	32.432	225.222	+0.497
15	17	Maurício Gugelmin (BRA)	PacWest Racing	32.438	225.180	+0.503
16	1	Gil de Ferran (BRA)	Team Penske	32.439	225.173	+0.504
17	22	Oriol Servià (ESP)	Sigma Autosport	32.468	224.972	+0.533
18	26	Paul Tracy (CAN)	Team Green	32.471	224.951	+0.536
19	25	Alex Barron (USA)	Aricero-Blair Racing	32.492	224.806	+0.557
20	5	Toranosuke Takagi (JPN)	Walker Racing	32.583	224.178	+0.648
21	66	Casey Mears (USA)	Mo Nunn Racing	32.607	224.013	+0.672
22	27	Dario Franchitti (GBR)	Team Green	32.653	223.698	+0.718
23	30	Roberto Moreno (BRA)	Patrick Racing	32.664	223.622	+0.729
24	3	Hélio Castroneves (BRA)	Team Penske	32.782	222.817	+0.847
25	32	Patrick Carpentier (CAN)	Forsythe Racing	34.985	208.787	+3.050
26	51	Adrián Fernández (MEX)	Fernández Racing	—	—	—

== Warm-up ==
The drivers took to the track at 12:10 local time for a 15-minute warm-up session. It was due to run for 30 minutes but was first delayed by a light rain shower that hit the area in the early morning. Then the session was prematurely ended when Barron drove into pit road with a large amount of fluid coming out from his car. Nakano was the fastest driver with a time of 32.280 seconds which was recorded on his second timed lap. Bräck took second, and Herta rounded out the top three.

== Race ==
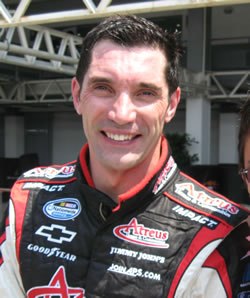
Max Papis (pictured in 2008) who led the race for 54 laps, more than any other driver.

Weather conditions at the start of the race were cloudy with an air temperature ranging from 72 to 78 °F (22 to 26 °C) and a track temperature between 77 and 91 °F (25 and 33 °C). Approximately 75,000 people attended the event. Most of the field chose a strategy of running at the front of the pack for as long as they could without driving to the lead because it would consume more fuel than needed and thus they elected to draft behind other cars. Barron started from the back of the field because he made a pit stop to have his electronics box changed. The start of the race was delayed to 1.27 p.m. because more rain had fallen. Tagliani maintained his pole position advantage heading into the first turn. Da Matta made a pass around the outside of Tagliani to move into first but Herta got ahead of him to lead the lap. After starting 12th, Tracy had moved into second by the sixth lap, while Herta lost the first position to Papis. Da Matta reclaimed the lead by lap 10 and held a three-tenths advantage over Papis, who in turn was two-tenths in front of Tracy. Franchitti had moved up into fourth, and was 0.6 seconds ahead of Gidley in fifth.

Tracy moved into the first position three laps later with Gidley running in his draft to clinch second place. Gidley drove right and got ahead of Tracy for the position entering the first turn. Castroneves took over first place when he passed Gidley on lap 16, but lost it to Papis two laps later. Gidley reclaimed the position on the 22nd lap, but Castroneves passed him three laps later. Da Matta and Castroneves shared first place over the following two laps. Papis retook the lead from Castroneves on the 31st lap. The first caution of the race was prompted on the following lap when Bräck spun and made heavy contact with the turn two outside wall and stopped at the bottom of the corner. He was uninjured but retired from the race. All of the leaders elected to make pit stops for fuel. Papis remained the leader at the lap-45 restart, and was followed by Castroneves. Kanaan moved into the lead by lap 50, but Papis retook it on the outside of turn one on the following lap. Gidley moved back into the lead by overtaking Papis on the inside of the first turn.

Herta retired on lap 55 when he slowed on the frontstretch with a voltage regulator problem, which cut out his engine. Da Matta moved back into first on the next lap, but Gidley reclaimed the position four laps later. Tracy slowed on the backstraight on lap 64 and drove to pit road to retire with a loss of engine power. On the 72nd lap, Vasser took the lead from Papis. Franchitti lost engine power after leaving turn one and drove down the backstraight to retire, necessitating the second caution. All drivers chose to make pit stops under caution. The race resumed on lap 80 with da Matta passing Castroneves to move back into first place. Da Matta fell to fourth after he was passed by Vasser to his right at turn one and Castroneves moved into second five laps later. Papis retook the first position on lap 86. Castroneves pulled off the track at turn four and stopped at the pit road exit to retire with an engine failure on the following lap. Mears moved into the lead on lap 87, but lost it to Papis two laps later. Da Matta and Papis traded the first position over laps 91 to 98. Tagliani took the lead on the 99th lap.

Da Matta reclaimed the first position on lap 103 before losing it to Papis on the next lap. After coming from a lap behind the rest of the field, Carpentier moved into the lead on lap 105, although Papis retook it on the following lap. Da Matta and Mears both held the position over the next two laps before Papis reclaimed it on lap 109. Andretti passed Papis to move into the first position on lap 110, before the Italian reclaimed it on the next lap. Da Matta, Andretti, Papis and Fernández all held the position over the following four laps. Green-flag pit stops began on lap 116. Papis and da Matta made their pit stops on laps 119 and 120. After the pit stops, Fernández moved back into the lead. Fittiapldi took over the first position on the 133rd lap, before Fernández passed him to retake the lead four laps later. Papis and Moreno shared the first position between laps 139 and 140, before da Matta retook the position seven laps later. Papis passed him to reclaim the lead on lap 148. Fernández moved back into first place on lap 150, and held a 0.7 second advantage over da Matta, who in turn was three-tenths of a second in front of Papis.

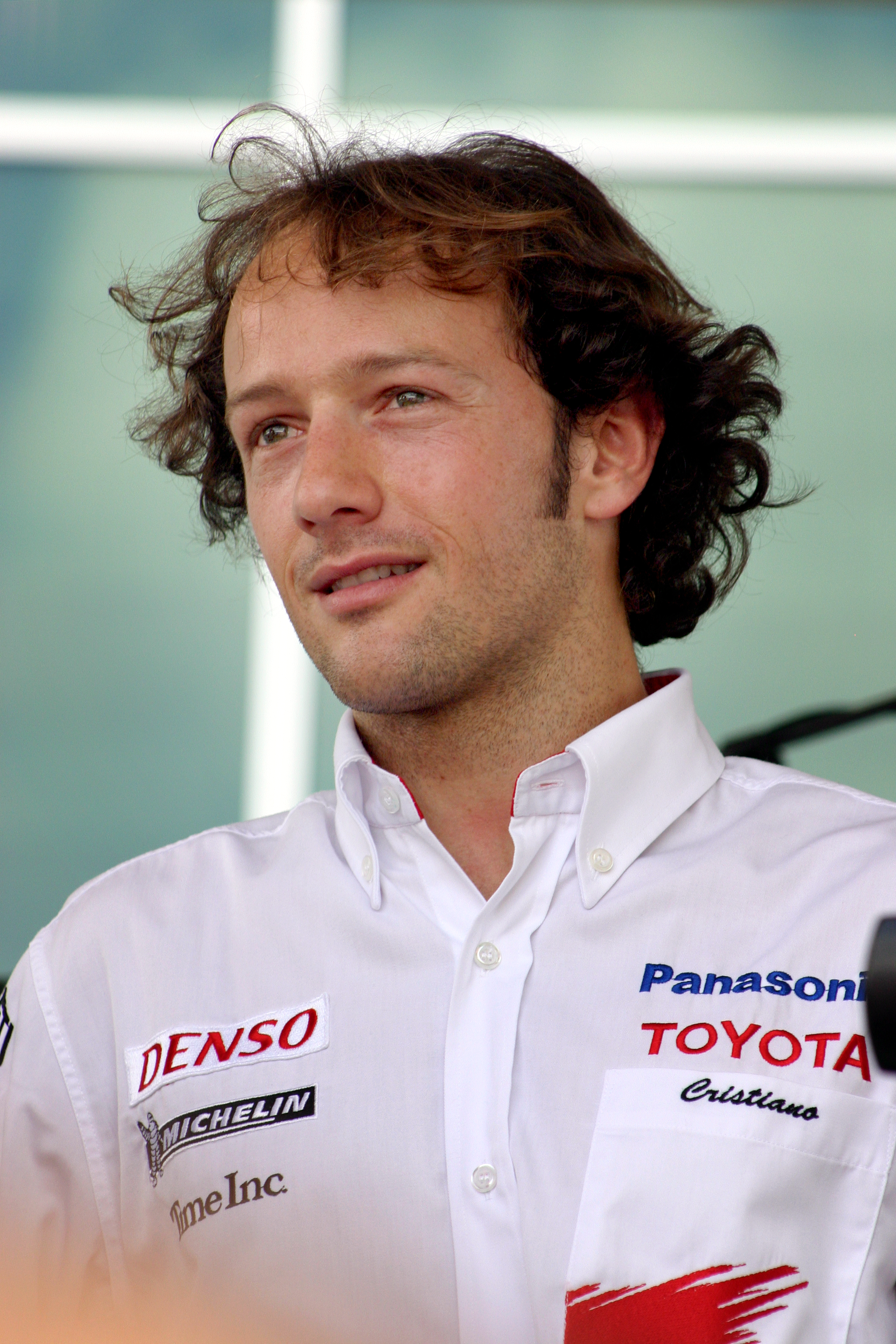
Cristiano da Matta (pictured in 2004) who won the race, the fourth of his CART career.

On lap 155, the third caution was given; Gugelmin's engine failed on the frontstretch and stopped at turn one. Course officials were required to clear the track up to the first turn. All of the leaders, including Fernández, made pit stops for fuel. Most of the teams instructed their drivers to conserve fuel in the hope they could reach the end of the race. Moreno's car billowed smoke on lap 160 but continued. Da Matta gained the lead for the restart on lap 167. After restarting from third, Papis moved into the lead two laps later. Kannan took over the first position on the 171st lap, before Junqueira passed him on the next lap. A section of front wing became dislodged from Moreno's car while entering turn three on lap 176, which triggered the fourth caution. During the caution, CART Chief Steward Chris Kneifel announced the event's distance would be reduced from 250 to 230 laps because of fading sunlight, and the leaders elected to make pit stops. Moreno remained the leader at the lap-183 restart but was overtaken by Junqueira in turn one. After restarting third, Tagliani fell to sixth. Carpentier passed Junqueira for the lead two laps later.

The fifth caution was shown on lap 188 when Moreno's engine failed on the top of the fourth turn and stopped at the exit of pit road to retire. Some drivers made pit stops for fuel under caution which would allow them to finish the race by using a rich fuel mixture which increased their top speeds. Racing resumed at the start of lap 196. Fernández veered right under acceleration on the same lap into the turn three entrance wall which removed his right-front wing section and his wheel. He slid across the track and stopped at the turn three infield apron, and the sixth caution was displayed. Consequently, Kneifel removed a further ten laps from the race's overall distance. The race restarted on lap 202 with Serviá battling Junqueira at the start-finish line for the lead. Serviá passed Junqueira shortly afterward and da Matta moved into second position. Tagliani overtook Serviá for second place on lap 204, while Papis passed Junqueira for fourth three laps later. De Ferran lost third after he was passed by Papis on the 209th lap; his engine went soft and sustained a punctured left-rear tire which increased understeer.

On lap 213, Papis went underneath da Matta to move back into the lead, before da Matta reclaimed the position on the following lap. Dixon steered right at the third turn on lap 216. and made heavy contact with the outside wall which he slid against. His right-hand side was heavily damaged and his right-rear wheel became detached and the final caution was prompted. Da Matta battled Papis for first place after holding it while the field was under caution. He held it for the remaining four laps to win the race. Papis finished second with Tagliani third. Junqueira took fourth and Kanaan finished in fifth. De Ferran, Andretti, Mears, Barron and Carpentier rounded out the top ten. Serviá, Vasser, Fittipadi, Gidley, Takagi and Jourdain were the last of the classified finishers. There were a CART record-breaking 73 lead changes in the race; 19 drivers reached the front of the field. (Note: The record had been held by the 1998 U.S. 500 Presented by Toyota at Michigan International Speedway which had 63 lead changes.) Papis' total of 54 laps led was the highest of any competitor. Da Matta led 16 times, for a total of 53 laps. The victory was the fourth of da Matta's CART career, his second in a row, and the final of three victories he posted in the 2001 season. The attrition race was low, with 16 of the 26 starters finishing the race.

=== Post-race ===
Da Matta appeared in victory lane and later on the podium to celebrate his third win of the season; the victory earned him $1 million. He was happy with the result: "I was pretty confident in the car and could go flat down to the end. You need to be a little lucky, being in the right place at the right time. For everybody, it's a very exciting race. We were racing all together all the time." Da Matta stated he did not want to lead the race with two laps remaining because of the draft and believed there would be a larger battle for the victory. Second-place finisher Papis said his team were planning a new strategy after the race's distance was reduced and had been looking forward to further racing and congratulated Da Matta on winning the race. Tagliani, who finished in third, revealed that he lifted from his accelerator pedal and ran in fifth gear on the backstraight and stated it was about conserving fuel and avoiding being caught in any incidents. He said the final ten laps felt like qualifying lap times and felt the race before then was "kind of boring, just driving around and around."

Junqueira, who finished fourth, felt he could have won the race had a caution flag not been displayed. Franchitti was disappointed not to finish: "It's such a shame because I really think we had a shot at the million dollars. We weren't really stretching the engine, either. We were just cruising along. We didn't want to lead the thing because of fuel consumption. We were running in the draft, looking real good." Despite his crash on lap 196, Fernández was pleased with his car as he felt comfortable driving along the race track: "We were having a great race. This was one of the best cars I have had at a superspeedway." Bräck stated his car experienced oversteer while driving alongside other competitors but felt his car ran efficiently. Tracy said his engine failure was a "disappointment" for his team and felt he had a car that could win the race. He said the event summed up a "season of frustration" but affirmed that his team would refocus and prepare for 2002. British magazine Autosport described it as similar to "a NASCAR restrictor plate race" because the cars often drove two or three abreast while racing in packs.

De Ferran ended the 2001 season with 199 points in the Drivers' Championship, 36 ahead of Bräck in second. Seventh-place finisher Andretti moved into third place, while Castroneves' retirement dropped him to fourth. Da Matta tied Castroneves on 141 points but finished fifth in the final standings due to countback. Honda finished the year 33-points ahead of second-placed Toyota, with Ford Cosworth third.

=== Race classification ===
Race results
Pos	No.	Driver	Team	Laps	Time/Retired	Grid	Points
1	6	Cristiano da Matta (BRA)	Newman/Haas Racing	220	2:59:39.716	2	20
2	7	Max Papis (ITA)	Team Rahal	220	+0.123	6	17^{2}
3	33	Alex Tagliani (CAN)	Forsythe Racing	220	+0.492	1	15^{1}
4	4	Bruno Junqueira (BRA)	Chip Ganassi Racing	220	+0.922	8	12
5	55	Tony Kanaan (BRA)	Mo Nunn Racing	220	+1.186	14	10
6	1	Gil de Ferran (BRA)	Team Penske	220	+3.131	16	8
7	39	Michael Andretti (USA)	Team Motorola	220	+3.848	13	6
8	66	Casey Mears (USA)	Mo Nunn Racing	220	+4.006	21	5
9	25	Alex Barron (USA)	Arciero-Blair Racing	220	+4.963	19	4
10	32	Patrick Carpentier (CAN)	Forsythe Racing	220	+5.818	25	3
11	22	Oriol Servià (ESP)	Sigma Autosport	220	+7.348	17	2
12	40	Jimmy Vasser (USA)	Patrick Racing	220	+8.911	9	1
13	11	Christian Fittipaldi (BRA)	Newman/Haas Racing	220	+9.319	5	—
14	12	Memo Gidley (USA)	Chip Ganassi Racing	220	+11.055	11	—
15	5	Toranosuke Takagi (JPN)	Walker Racing	220	+36.820	20	—
16	16	Michel Jourdain Jr. (MEX)	Bettenhausen Racing	219	+1 Lap	7	—
17	18	Scott Dixon (NZL)	PacWest Racing	215	Contact	10	—
18	51	Adrián Fernández (MEX)	Fernández Racing	195	Contact	26	—
19	20	Roberto Moreno (BRA)	Patrick Racing	188	Mechanical	23	—
20	17	Maurício Gugelmin (BRA)	PacWest Racing	154	Mechanical	15	—
21	52	Shinji Nakano (JPN)	Fernández Racing	119	Mechanical	12	—
22	3	Hélio Castroneves (BRA)	Team Penske	86	Mechanical	24	—
23	27	Dario Franchitti (GBR)	Team Green	74	Mechanical	22	—
24	26	Paul Tracy (CAN)	Team Green	64	Mechanical	18	—
25	77	Bryan Herta (USA)	Forsythe Racing	54	Electrical	4	—
26	8	Kenny Bräck (SWE)	Team Rahal	31	Contact	3	—

Notes

- ^1— Includes one bonus point for being the fastest qualifier.
- ^2— Includes one bonus point for leading the most laps.

== Standings after the race ==
Drivers' Championship standings
Rank	+/–	Driver	Points
1		Gil de Ferran (BRA)	199
2		Kenny Bräck (SWE)	163 (−36)
3	1	Michael Andretti (USA)	147 (−52)
4	1	Hélio Castroneves (BRA)	141 (−58)
5		Cristiano da Matta (BRA)	141 (−58)

Constructors' standings
Rank	+/–	Constructor	Points
1		Reynard (UK)	378
2		Lola (UK)	335 (−43)

Manufacturers' standings
Rank	+/–	Manufacturer	Points
1		Honda (JPN)	342
2		Toyota (JPN)	309 (−33)
3		Ford Cosworth (UK)	297 (−45)

- Note: Only the top five positions are included for the drivers' standings.

== Notes and references ==
=== References ===
Previous race: 2001 Honda Indy 300	CART FedEx Championship Series; 2001 season	Next race: 2002 Tecate/Telmex Monterrey Grand Prix
Previous race: 2000 Marlboro 500	Marlboro 500	Next race: 2002 The 500
