= 2019 Bluegreen Vacations 500 =

Race details
- Race 35 of 36 in the 2019 Monster Energy NASCAR Cup Series
- Date: November 10, 2019
- Location: ISM Raceway in Avondale, Arizona
- Course: Permanent racing facility
- Course length: 1 miles (1.6 km)
- Distance: 312 laps, 312 mi (499.2 km)
- Average speed: 111.429 miles per hour (179.328 km/h)

Pole position
Driver	Kyle Busch	Joe Gibbs Racing
- Time: 25.693

Most laps led
Driver	Denny Hamlin	Joe Gibbs Racing
- Laps: 143

Winner
No. 11	Denny Hamlin	Joe Gibbs Racing

Television in the United States
- Network: NBC
- Announcers: Rick Allen, Jeff Burton, Steve Letarte and Dale Earnhardt Jr.
- Nielsen ratings: 2.567 million

Radio in the United States
- Radio: MRN
- Booth announcers: Alex Hayden, Jeff Striegle and Rusty Wallace
- Turn announcers: Dan Hubbard (1 & 2) and Kyle Rickey (3 & 4)

The 2019 Bluegreen Vacations 500 was a Monster Energy NASCAR Cup Series race that was held on November 10, 2019, at ISM Raceway in Avondale, Arizona. Contested over 312 laps on the one mile (1.6 km) oval, it was the 35th race of the 2019 Monster Energy NASCAR Cup Series season, ninth race of the Playoffs, and final race of the Round of 8.

== Report ==
=== Background ===
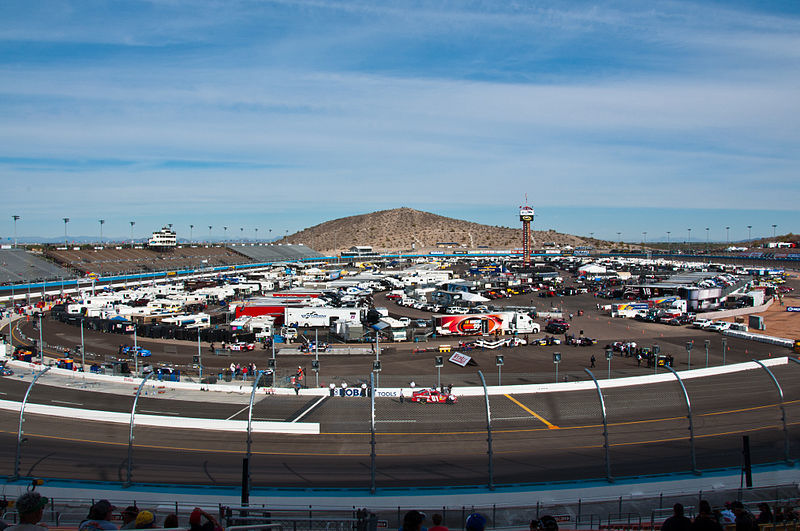
ISM Raceway, the track where the race was held.

ISM Raceway – also known as PIR – is a one-mile, low-banked tri-oval race track located in Avondale, Arizona. It is named after the nearby metropolitan area of Phoenix. The motorsport track opened in 1964 and currently hosts two NASCAR race weekends annually. PIR has also hosted the IndyCar Series, CART, USAC and the Rolex Sports Car Series. The raceway is currently owned and operated by International Speedway Corporation.

The raceway was originally constructed with a 2.5 mi (4.0 km) road course that ran both inside and outside of the main tri-oval. In 1991 the track was reconfigured with the current 1.51 mi (2.43 km) interior layout. PIR has an estimated grandstand seating capacity of around 67,000. Lights were installed around the track in 2004 following the addition of a second annual NASCAR race weekend.

ISM Raceway is home to two annual NASCAR race weekends, one of 13 facilities on the NASCAR schedule to host more than one race weekend a year. The track is both the first and last stop in the western United States, as well as the fourth and penultimate track on the schedule.

==== Entry list ====
- (i) denotes driver who are ineligible for series driver points.
- (R) denotes rookie driver.

No.	Driver	Team	Manufacturer
00	Landon Cassill (i)	StarCom Racing	Chevrolet
1	Kurt Busch	Chip Ganassi Racing	Chevrolet
2	Brad Keselowski	Team Penske	Ford
3	Austin Dillon	Richard Childress Racing	Chevrolet
4	Kevin Harvick	Stewart-Haas Racing	Ford
6	Ryan Newman	Roush Fenway Racing	Ford
8	Daniel Hemric (R)	Richard Childress Racing	Chevrolet
9	Chase Elliott	Hendrick Motorsports	Chevrolet
10	Aric Almirola	Stewart-Haas Racing	Ford
11	Denny Hamlin	Joe Gibbs Racing	Toyota
12	Ryan Blaney	Team Penske	Ford
13	Ty Dillon	Germain Racing	Chevrolet
14	Clint Bowyer	Stewart-Haas Racing	Ford
15	Ross Chastain (i)	Premium Motorsports	Chevrolet
17	Ricky Stenhouse Jr.	Roush Fenway Racing	Ford
18	Kyle Busch	Joe Gibbs Racing	Toyota
19	Martin Truex Jr.	Joe Gibbs Racing	Toyota
20	Erik Jones	Joe Gibbs Racing	Toyota
21	Paul Menard	Wood Brothers Racing	Ford
22	Joey Logano	Team Penske	Ford
24	William Byron	Hendrick Motorsports	Chevrolet
27	Joe Nemechek (i)	Premium Motorsports	Chevrolet
32	Corey LaJoie	Go Fas Racing	Ford
34	Michael McDowell	Front Row Motorsports	Ford
36	John Hunter Nemechek (i)	Front Row Motorsports	Ford
37	Chris Buescher	JTG Daugherty Racing	Chevrolet
38	David Ragan	Front Row Motorsports	Ford
41	Daniel Suárez	Stewart-Haas Racing	Ford
42	Kyle Larson	Chip Ganassi Racing	Chevrolet
43	Bubba Wallace	Richard Petty Motorsports	Chevrolet
47	Ryan Preece (R)	JTG Daugherty Racing	Chevrolet
48	Jimmie Johnson	Hendrick Motorsports	Chevrolet
51	Garrett Smithley (i)	Petty Ware Racing	Chevrolet
52	Bayley Currey (i)	Rick Ware Racing	Chevrolet
53	J. J. Yeley (i)	Rick Ware Racing	Ford
66	Joey Gase (i)	MBM Motorsports	Toyota
77	Reed Sorenson	Spire Motorsports	Chevrolet
88	Alex Bowman	Hendrick Motorsports	Chevrolet
95	Matt DiBenedetto	Leavine Family Racing	Toyota
Official entry list

== Practice ==
=== First practice ===
Kyle Busch was the fastest in the first practice session with a time of 26.170 seconds and a speed of 137.562 mph (221.385 km/h).

Pos	No.	Driver	Team	Manufacturer	Time	Speed
1	18	Kyle Busch	Joe Gibbs Racing	Toyota	26.170	137.562
2	11	Denny Hamlin	Joe Gibbs Racing	Toyota	26.186	137.478
3	95	Matt DiBenedetto	Leavine Family Racing	Toyota	26.245	137.169
Official first practice results

=== Final practice ===
Chase Elliott was the fastest in the final practice session with a time of 25.969 seconds and a speed of 138.627 mph (223.099 km/h).

Pos	No.	Driver	Team	Manufacturer	Time	Speed
1	9	Chase Elliott	Hendrick Motorsports	Chevrolet	25.969	138.627
2	12	Ryan Blaney	Team Penske	Ford	26.238	137.206
3	4	Kevin Harvick	Stewart-Haas Racing	Ford	26.294	136.913
Official final practice results

== Qualifying ==
Kyle Busch scored the pole for the race with a time of 25.693 and a speed of 140.116 mph (225.495 km/h).

=== Qualifying results ===
Pos	No.	Driver	Team	Manufacturer	Time
1	18	Kyle Busch	Joe Gibbs Racing	Toyota	25.693
2	22	Joey Logano	Team Penske	Ford	25.760
3	11	Denny Hamlin	Joe Gibbs Racing	Toyota	25.826
4	19	Martin Truex Jr.	Joe Gibbs Racing	Toyota	25.839
5	42	Kyle Larson	Chip Ganassi Racing	Chevrolet	25.855
6	9	Chase Elliott	Hendrick Motorsports	Chevrolet	25.866
7	4	Kevin Harvick	Stewart-Haas Racing	Ford	25.914
8	1	Kurt Busch	Chip Ganassi Racing	Chevrolet	25.916
9	20	Erik Jones	Joe Gibbs Racing	Toyota	25.925
10	12	Ryan Blaney	Team Penske	Ford	25.945
11	10	Aric Almirola	Stewart-Haas Racing	Ford	25.972
12	2	Brad Keselowski	Team Penske	Ford	25.989
13	14	Clint Bowyer	Stewart-Haas Racing	Ford	26.008
14	88	Alex Bowman	Hendrick Motorsports	Chevrolet	26.021
15	41	Daniel Suárez	Stewart-Haas Racing	Ford	26.062
16	95	Matt DiBenedetto	Leavine Family Racing	Toyota	26.080
17	37	Chris Buescher	JTG Daugherty Racing	Chevrolet	26.091
18	24	William Byron	Hendrick Motorsports	Chevrolet	26.132
19	21	Paul Menard	Wood Brothers Racing	Ford	26.179
20	6	Ryan Newman	Roush Fenway Racing	Ford	26.206
21	34	Michael McDowell	Front Row Motorsports	Ford	26.263
22	48	Jimmie Johnson	Hendrick Motorsports	Chevrolet	26.268
23	43	Bubba Wallace	Richard Petty Motorsports	Chevrolet	26.278
24	17	Ricky Stenhouse Jr.	Roush Fenway Racing	Ford	26.288
25	47	Ryan Preece (R)	JTG Daugherty Racing	Chevrolet	26.330
26	36	John Hunter Nemechek (i)	Front Row Motorsports	Ford	26.351
27	8	Daniel Hemric (R)	Richard Childress Racing	Chevrolet	26.360
28	3	Austin Dillon	Richard Childress Racing	Chevrolet	26.423
29	13	Ty Dillon	Germain Racing	Chevrolet	26.560
30	38	David Ragan	Front Row Motorsports	Ford	26.586
31	32	Corey LaJoie	Go Fas Racing	Ford	26.600
32	15	Ross Chastain (i)	Premium Motorsports	Chevrolet	26.933
33	00	Landon Cassill (i)	StarCom Racing	Chevrolet	26.993
34	52	Bayley Currey (i)	Rick Ware Racing	Chevrolet	27.042
35	51	Garrett Smithley (i)	Petty Ware Racing	Chevrolet	27.149
36	27	Joe Nemechek (i)	Premium Motorsports	Chevrolet	27.357
37	77	Reed Sorenson	Spire Motorsports	Chevrolet	27.834
38	66	Joey Gase (i)	MBM Motorsports	Toyota	27.903
39	53	J. J. Yeley (i)	Rick Ware Racing	Ford	0.000
Official qualifying results

== Race ==
=== Stage results ===
Stage One Laps: 75

Pos	No	Driver	Team	Manufacturer	Points
1	11	Denny Hamlin	Joe Gibbs Racing	Toyota	10
2	9	Chase Elliott	Hendrick Motorsports	Chevrolet	9
3	18	Kyle Busch	Joe Gibbs Racing	Toyota	8
4	22	Joey Logano	Team Penske	Ford	7
5	42	Kyle Larson	Chip Ganassi Racing	Chevrolet	6
6	2	Brad Keselowski	Team Penske	Ford	5
7	12	Ryan Blaney	Team Penske	Ford	4
8	24	William Byron	Hendrick Motorsports	Chevrolet	3
9	4	Kevin Harvick	Stewart-Haas Racing	Ford	2
10	1	Kurt Busch	Chip Ganassi Racing	Chevrolet	1
Official stage one results

Stage Two Laps: 75

Pos	No	Driver	Team	Manufacturer	Points
1	22	Joey Logano	Team Penske	Ford	10
2	11	Denny Hamlin	Joe Gibbs Racing	Toyota	9
3	9	Chase Elliott	Hendrick Motorsports	Chevrolet	8
4	18	Kyle Busch	Joe Gibbs Racing	Toyota	7
5	12	Ryan Blaney	Team Penske	Ford	6
6	19	Martin Truex Jr.	Joe Gibbs Racing	Toyota	5
7	4	Kevin Harvick	Stewart-Haas Racing	Ford	4
8	42	Kyle Larson	Chip Ganassi Racing	Chevrolet	3
9	2	Brad Keselowski	Team Penske	Ford	2
10	1	Kurt Busch	Chip Ganassi Racing	Chevrolet	1
Official stage two results

=== Final stage results ===
Stage Three Laps: 162

Pos	Grid	No	Driver	Team	Manufacturer	Laps	Points
1	3	11	Denny Hamlin	Joe Gibbs Racing	Toyota	312	59
2	1	18	Kyle Busch	Joe Gibbs Racing	Toyota	312	50
3	10	12	Ryan Blaney	Team Penske	Ford	312	44
4	5	42	Kyle Larson	Chip Ganassi Racing	Chevrolet	312	42
5	7	4	Kevin Harvick	Stewart-Haas Racing	Ford	312	38
6	4	19	Martin Truex Jr.	Joe Gibbs Racing	Toyota	312	36
7	9	20	Erik Jones	Joe Gibbs Racing	Toyota	312	30
8	13	14	Clint Bowyer	Stewart-Haas Racing	Ford	312	29
9	2	22	Joey Logano	Team Penske	Ford	312	45
10	12	2	Brad Keselowski	Team Penske	Ford	312	34
11	8	1	Kurt Busch	Chip Ganassi Racing	Chevrolet	312	28
12	19	21	Paul Menard	Wood Brothers Racing	Ford	312	25
13	16	95	Matt DiBenedetto	Leavine Family Racing	Toyota	312	24
14	22	48	Jimmie Johnson	Hendrick Motorsports	Chevrolet	312	23
15	15	41	Daniel Suárez	Stewart-Haas Racing	Ford	312	22
16	17	37	Chris Buescher	JTG Daugherty Racing	Chevrolet	311	21
17	18	24	William Byron	Hendrick Motorsports	Chevrolet	311	23
18	20	6	Ryan Newman	Roush Fenway Racing	Ford	311	19
19	24	17	Ricky Stenhouse Jr.	Roush Fenway Racing	Ford	311	18
20	29	13	Ty Dillon	Germain Racing	Chevrolet	311	17
21	27	8	Daniel Hemric (R)	Richard Childress Racing	Chevrolet	311	16
22	11	10	Aric Almirola	Stewart-Haas Racing	Ford	310	15
23	14	88	Alex Bowman	Hendrick Motorsports	Chevrolet	310	14
24	28	3	Austin Dillon	Richard Childress Racing	Chevrolet	309	13
25	23	43	Bubba Wallace	Richard Petty Motorsports	Chevrolet	308	12
26	25	47	Ryan Preece (R)	JTG Daugherty Racing	Chevrolet	307	11
27	26	36	John Hunter Nemechek (i)	Front Row Motorsports	Ford	307	0
28	32	15	Ross Chastain (i)	Premium Motorsports	Chevrolet	307	0
29	39	53	J. J. Yeley (i)	Rick Ware Racing	Ford	306	0
30	21	34	Michael McDowell	Front Row Motorsports	Ford	306	7
31	35	51	Garrett Smithley (i)	Petty Ware Racing	Chevrolet	304	0
32	34	52	Bayley Currey (i)	Rick Ware Racing	Chevrolet	304	0
33	33	00	Landon Cassill (i)	StarCom Racing	Chevrolet	303	0
34	36	27	Joe Nemechek (i)	Premium Motorsports	Chevrolet	296	0
35	31	32	Corey LaJoie	Go Fas Racing	Ford	294	2
36	30	38	David Ragan	Front Row Motorsports	Ford	261	1
37	37	77	Reed Sorenson	Spire Motorsports	Chevrolet	226	1
38	38	66	Joey Gase (i)	MBM Motorsports	Toyota	170	0
39	6	9	Chase Elliott	Hendrick Motorsports	Chevrolet	165	18
Official race results

=== Race statistics ===
- Lead changes: 8 among 5 different drivers
- Cautions/Laps: 5 for 32
- Red flags: 0
- Time of race: 2 hours, 48 minutes and 0 seconds
- Average speed: 111.429 miles per hour (179.328 km/h)

== Media ==
=== Television ===
NBC Sports will cover the race on the television side. Rick Allen, two–time Phoenix winner Jeff Burton, Steve Letarte and three-time Phoenix winner Dale Earnhardt Jr. had the call in the booth for the race. Dave Burns, Parker Kligerman, Marty Snider and Kelli Stavast reported from pit lane during the race.

NBC
Booth announcers	Pit reporters
Lap-by-lap: Rick Allen; Color-commentator: Jeff Burton; Color-commentator: Steve Letarte; Color-commentator: Dale Earnhardt Jr.	Dave Burns; Parker Kligerman; Marty Snider; Kelli Stavast

=== Radio ===
MRN covered the radio call for the race, which was simulcast on Sirius XM NASCAR Radio. Alex Hayden, Jeff Striegle, and Rusty Wallace called the action from the broadcast booth when the field raced down the front straightaway. Dan Hubbard called the action from turns 1 & 2 and Kyle Rickey called the action from turns 3 & 4. Winston Kelley, Steve Post, Kim Coon, and Dillon Welch called the action on MRN from pit lane.

MRN
Booth announcers	Turn announcers	Pit reporters
Lead announcer: Alex Hayden; Announcer: Jeff Striegle; Announcer: Rusty Wallace	Turns 1 & 2: Dan Hubbard; Turns 3 & 4: Kyle Rickey	Winston Kelley; Steve Post; Kim Coon; Dillon Welch

== Standings after the race ==
	Pos	Driver	Points
4	1	Denny Hamlin	5,000
	2	Kevin Harvick	5,000 (–0)
2	3	Martin Truex Jr.	5,000 (–0)
1	4	Kyle Busch	5,000 (–0)
1	5	Joey Logano	2,344 (–2,656)
1	6	Kyle Larson	2,321 (–2,679)
2	7	Ryan Blaney	2,303 (–2,697)
1	8	Brad Keselowski	2,299 (–2,701)
1	9	William Byron	2,270 (–2,730)
1	10	Clint Bowyer	2,254 (–2,746)
3	11	Chase Elliott	2,253 (–2,747)
	12	Alex Bowman	2,229 (–2,771)
1	13	Kurt Busch	2,221 (–2,779)
1	14	Aric Almirola	2,219 (–2,781)
	15	Ryan Newman	2,189 (–2,811)
	16	Erik Jones	2,157 (–2,843)
Official driver's standings

Manufacturers' Championship standings

Pos	Manufacturer	Points
1	Toyota	1,278
2	Ford	1,235 (–43)
3	Chevrolet	1,193 (–85)

- Note: Only the first 16 positions are included for the driver standings.

Previous race: 2019 AAA Texas 500	Monster Energy NASCAR Cup Series; 2019 season	Next race: 2019 Ford EcoBoost 400
