= 2019 AAA Texas 500 =

Race details
- Race 34 of 36 in the 2019 Monster Energy NASCAR Cup Series
- Date: November 3, 2019
- Location: Texas Motor Speedway in Fort Worth, Texas
- Course: Permanent racing facility
- Course length: 1.5 miles (2.4 km)
- Distance: 334 laps, 501 mi (801.6 km)
- Average speed: 133.759 miles per hour (215.264 km/h)

Pole position
Driver	Kevin Harvick	Stewart-Haas Racing
- Time: 28.465

Most laps led
Driver	Kevin Harvick	Stewart-Haas Racing
- Laps: 119

Winner
No. 4	Kevin Harvick	Stewart-Haas Racing

Television in the United States
- Network: NBCSN
- Announcers: Rick Allen, Jeff Burton, Steve Letarte and Dale Earnhardt Jr.
- Nielsen ratings: 2.199 million

Radio in the United States
- Radio: PRN
- Booth announcers: Doug Rice and Mark Garrow
- Turn announcers: Rob Albright (1 & 2) and Pat Patterson (3 & 4)

The 2019 AAA Texas 500 was a Monster Energy NASCAR Cup Series race held on November 3, 2019, at Texas Motor Speedway in Fort Worth, Texas. Contested over 334 laps on the 1.5 mile (2.4 km) intermediate quad-oval, it was the 34th race of the 2019 Monster Energy NASCAR Cup Series season, eighth race of the Playoffs, and second race of the Round of 8.

== Report ==
=== Background ===
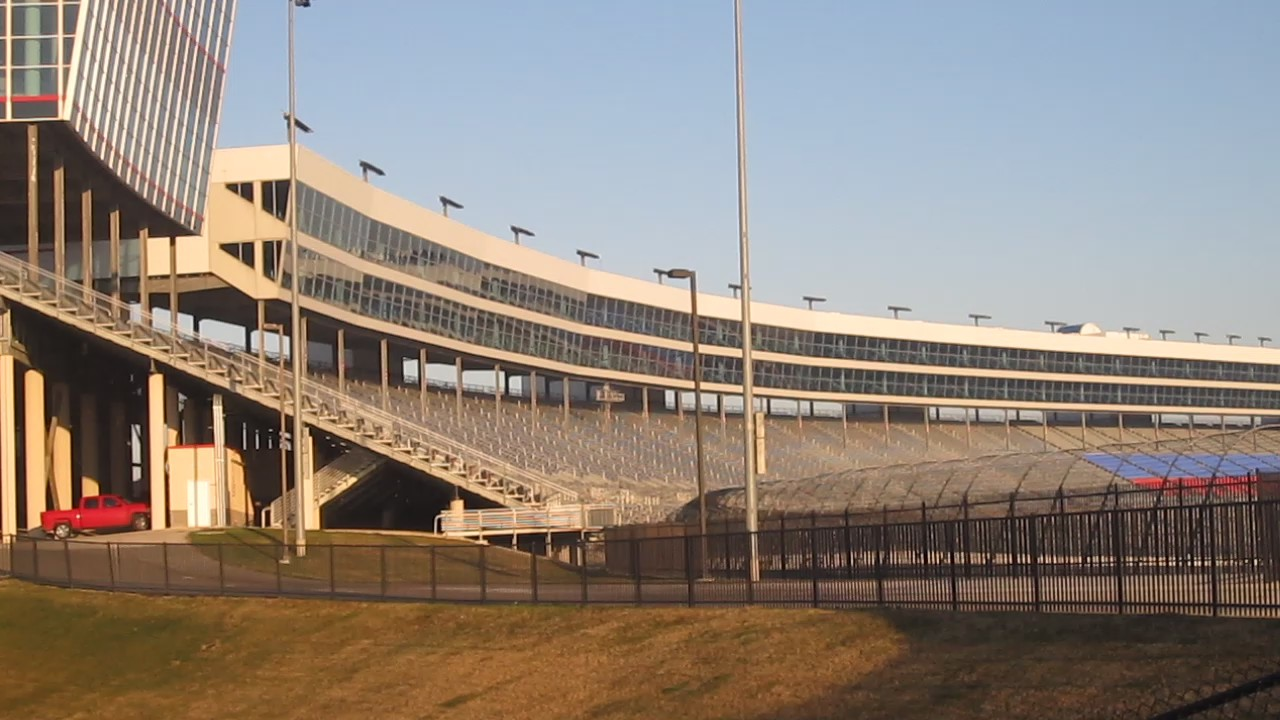
Texas Motor Speedway, the track where the race was held.

Texas Motor Speedway is a speedway located in the northernmost portion of the U.S. city of Fort Worth, Texas – the portion located in Denton County, Texas. The track measures 1.5 miles (2.4 km) around and is banked 24 degrees in the turns, and is of the oval design, where the front straightaway juts outward slightly. The track layout is similar to Atlanta Motor Speedway and Charlotte Motor Speedway (formerly Lowe's Motor Speedway). The track is owned by Speedway Motorsports, Inc., the same company that owns Atlanta and Charlotte Motor Speedways, as well as the short-track Bristol Motor Speedway.

==== Entry list ====
- (i) denotes driver who are ineligible for series driver points.
- (R) denotes rookie driver.

No.	Driver	Team	Manufacturer
00	Landon Cassill (i)	StarCom Racing	Chevrolet
1	Kurt Busch	Chip Ganassi Racing	Chevrolet
2	Brad Keselowski	Team Penske	Ford
3	Austin Dillon	Richard Childress Racing	Chevrolet
4	Kevin Harvick	Stewart-Haas Racing	Ford
6	Ryan Newman	Roush Fenway Racing	Ford
8	Daniel Hemric (R)	Richard Childress Racing	Chevrolet
9	Chase Elliott	Hendrick Motorsports	Chevrolet
10	Aric Almirola	Stewart-Haas Racing	Ford
11	Denny Hamlin	Joe Gibbs Racing	Toyota
12	Ryan Blaney	Team Penske	Ford
13	Ty Dillon	Germain Racing	Chevrolet
14	Clint Bowyer	Stewart-Haas Racing	Ford
15	Joe Nemechek (i)	Premium Motorsports	Chevrolet
17	Ricky Stenhouse Jr.	Roush Fenway Racing	Ford
18	Kyle Busch	Joe Gibbs Racing	Toyota
19	Martin Truex Jr.	Joe Gibbs Racing	Toyota
20	Erik Jones	Joe Gibbs Racing	Toyota
21	Paul Menard	Wood Brothers Racing	Ford
22	Joey Logano	Team Penske	Ford
24	William Byron	Hendrick Motorsports	Chevrolet
27	Ross Chastain (i)	Premium Motorsports	Chevrolet
32	Corey LaJoie	Go Fas Racing	Ford
34	Michael McDowell	Front Row Motorsports	Ford
36	John Hunter Nemechek (i)	Front Row Motorsports	Ford
37	Chris Buescher	JTG Daugherty Racing	Chevrolet
38	David Ragan	Front Row Motorsports	Ford
41	Daniel Suárez	Stewart-Haas Racing	Ford
42	Kyle Larson	Chip Ganassi Racing	Chevrolet
43	Bubba Wallace	Richard Petty Motorsports	Chevrolet
47	Ryan Preece (R)	JTG Daugherty Racing	Chevrolet
48	Jimmie Johnson	Hendrick Motorsports	Chevrolet
51	Josh Bilicki (i)	Petty Ware Racing	Chevrolet
52	Garrett Smithley (i)	Rick Ware Racing	Ford
53	J. J. Yeley (i)	Rick Ware Racing	Ford
66	Timmy Hill (i)	MBM Motorsports	Toyota
77	Quin Houff	Spire Motorsports	Chevrolet
88	Alex Bowman	Hendrick Motorsports	Chevrolet
95	Matt DiBenedetto	Leavine Family Racing	Toyota
96	Parker Kligerman	Gaunt Brothers Racing	Toyota
Official entry list

== Practice ==
=== First practice ===
Clint Bowyer was the fastest in the first practice session with a time of 28.620 seconds and a speed of 188.679 mph (303.649 km/h).

Pos	No.	Driver	Team	Manufacturer	Time	Speed
1	14	Clint Bowyer	Stewart-Haas Racing	Ford	28.620	188.679
2	1	Kurt Busch	Chip Ganassi Racing	Chevrolet	28.636	188.574
3	11	Denny Hamlin	Joe Gibbs Racing	Toyota	28.674	188.324
Official first practice results

=== Final practice ===
Aric Almirola was the fastest in the final practice session with a time of 28.638 seconds and a speed of 188.561 mph (303.460 km/h).

Pos	No.	Driver	Team	Manufacturer	Time	Speed
1	10	Aric Almirola	Stewart-Haas Racing	Ford	28.638	188.561
2	11	Denny Hamlin	Joe Gibbs Racing	Toyota	28.670	188.350
3	14	Clint Bowyer	Stewart-Haas Racing	Ford	28.684	188.258
Official final practice results

== Qualifying ==
Kevin Harvick scored the pole for the race with a time of 28.465 and a speed of 189.707 mph (305.304 km/h).

=== Qualifying results ===
Pos	No.	Driver	Team	Manufacturer	Time
1	4	Kevin Harvick	Stewart-Haas Racing	Ford	28.465
2	20	Erik Jones	Joe Gibbs Racing	Toyota	28.588
3	11	Denny Hamlin	Joe Gibbs Racing	Toyota	28.615
4	1	Kurt Busch	Chip Ganassi Racing	Chevrolet	28.657
5	88	Alex Bowman	Hendrick Motorsports	Chevrolet	28.669
6	10	Aric Almirola	Stewart-Haas Racing	Ford	28.675
7	41	Daniel Suárez	Stewart-Haas Racing	Ford	28.723
8	2	Brad Keselowski	Team Penske	Ford	28.727
9	17	Ricky Stenhouse Jr.	Roush Fenway Racing	Ford	28.734
10	95	Matt DiBenedetto	Leavine Family Racing	Toyota	28.740
11	22	Joey Logano	Team Penske	Ford	28.755
12	18	Kyle Busch	Joe Gibbs Racing	Toyota	28.764
13	42	Kyle Larson	Chip Ganassi Racing	Chevrolet	28.782
14	9	Chase Elliott	Hendrick Motorsports	Chevrolet	28.817
15	12	Ryan Blaney	Team Penske	Ford	28.841
16	8	Daniel Hemric (R)	Richard Childress Racing	Chevrolet	28.846
17	19	Martin Truex Jr.	Joe Gibbs Racing	Toyota	28.863
18	24	William Byron	Hendrick Motorsports	Chevrolet	28.901
19	13	Ty Dillon	Germain Racing	Chevrolet	28.901
20	37	Chris Buescher	JTG Daugherty Racing	Chevrolet	28.914
21	3	Austin Dillon	Richard Childress Racing	Chevrolet	28.915
22	43	Bubba Wallace	Richard Petty Motorsports	Chevrolet	28.931
23	48	Jimmie Johnson	Hendrick Motorsports	Chevrolet	28.936
24	14	Clint Bowyer	Stewart-Haas Racing	Ford	28.938
25	6	Ryan Newman	Roush Fenway Racing	Ford	28.951
26	38	David Ragan	Front Row Motorsports	Ford	28.983
27	34	Michael McDowell	Front Row Motorsports	Ford	29.004
28	47	Ryan Preece (R)	JTG Daugherty Racing	Chevrolet	29.018
29	36	John Hunter Nemechek (i)	Front Row Motorsports	Ford	29.097
30	96	Parker Kligerman (i)	Gaunt Brothers Racing	Toyota	29.123
31	21	Paul Menard	Wood Brothers Racing	Ford	29.135
32	00	Landon Cassill (i)	StarCom Racing	Chevrolet	29.194
33	32	Corey LaJoie	Go Fas Racing	Ford	29.311
34	53	J. J. Yeley (i)	Rick Ware Racing	Ford	29.534
35	27	Ross Chastain (i)	Premium Motorsports	Chevrolet	29.633
36	52	Garrett Smithley (i)	Rick Ware Racing	Ford	29.830
37	77	Quin Houff	Spire Motorsports	Chevrolet	29.831
38	15	Joe Nemechek (i)	Premium Motorsports	Chevrolet	30.025
39	51	Josh Bilicki (i)	Petty Ware Racing	Chevrolet	30.278
40	66	Timmy Hill (i)	MBM Motorsports	Toyota	30.647
Official qualifying results

== Race ==
=== Stage results ===
Stage One Laps: 85

Pos	No	Driver	Team	Manufacturer	Points
1	4	Kevin Harvick	Stewart-Haas Racing	Ford	10
2	14	Clint Bowyer	Stewart-Haas Racing	Ford	9
3	42	Kyle Larson	Chip Ganassi Racing	Chevrolet	8
4	88	Alex Bowman	Hendrick Motorsports	Chevrolet	7
5	18	Kyle Busch	Joe Gibbs Racing	Toyota	6
6	3	Austin Dillon	Richard Childress Racing	Chevrolet	5
7	1	Kurt Busch	Chip Ganassi Racing	Chevrolet	4
8	47	Ryan Preece (R)	JTG Daugherty Racing	Chevrolet	3
9	12	Ryan Blaney	Team Penske	Ford	2
10	8	Daniel Hemric (R)	Richard Childress Racing	Chevrolet	1
Official stage one results

Stage Two Laps: 85

Pos	No	Driver	Team	Manufacturer	Points
1	10	Aric Almirola	Stewart-Haas Racing	Ford	10
2	20	Erik Jones	Joe Gibbs Racing	Toyota	9
3	48	Jimmie Johnson	Hendrick Motorsports	Chevrolet	8
4	42	Kyle Larson	Chip Ganassi Racing	Chevrolet	7
5	22	Joey Logano	Team Penske	Ford	6
6	4	Kevin Harvick	Stewart-Haas Racing	Ford	5
7	88	Alex Bowman	Hendrick Motorsports	Chevrolet	4
8	41	Daniel Suárez	Stewart-Haas Racing	Ford	3
9	18	Kyle Busch	Joe Gibbs Racing	Toyota	2
10	24	William Byron	Hendrick Motorsports	Chevrolet	1
Official stage two results

=== Final stage results ===
Stage Three Laps: 164

Pos	Grid	No	Driver	Team	Manufacturer	Laps	Points
1	1	4	Kevin Harvick	Stewart-Haas Racing	Ford	334	55
2	6	10	Aric Almirola	Stewart-Haas Racing	Ford	334	45
3	7	41	Daniel Suárez	Stewart-Haas Racing	Ford	334	37
4	11	22	Joey Logano	Team Penske	Ford	334	39
5	5	88	Alex Bowman	Hendrick Motorsports	Chevrolet	334	43
6	17	19	Martin Truex Jr.	Joe Gibbs Racing	Toyota	334	31
7	12	18	Kyle Busch	Joe Gibbs Racing	Toyota	334	38
8	15	12	Ryan Blaney	Team Penske	Ford	334	31
9	4	1	Kurt Busch	Chip Ganassi Racing	Chevrolet	334	32
10	2	20	Erik Jones	Joe Gibbs Racing	Toyota	334	36
11	22	14	Clint Bowyer	Stewart-Haas Racing	Ford	334	35
12	13	42	Kyle Larson	Chip Ganassi Racing	Chevrolet	334	40
13	21	3	Austin Dillon	Richard Childress Racing	Chevrolet	334	29
14	10	95	Matt DiBenedetto	Leavine Family Racing	Toyota	334	23
15	25	6	Ryan Newman	Roush Fenway Racing	Ford	333	22
16	16	8	Daniel Hemric (R)	Richard Childress Racing	Chevrolet	333	22
17	18	24	William Byron	Hendrick Motorsports	Chevrolet	333	21
18	19	13	Ty Dillon	Germain Racing	Chevrolet	333	19
19	20	37	Chris Buescher	JTG Daugherty Racing	Chevrolet	333	18
20	31	21	Paul Menard	Wood Brothers Racing	Ford	333	17
21	29	36	John Hunter Nemechek (i)	Front Row Motorsports	Ford	333	0
22	30	96	Parker Kligerman (i)	Gaunt Brothers Racing	Toyota	332	0
23	28	47	Ryan Preece (R)	JTG Daugherty Racing	Chevrolet	331	17
24	22	43	Bubba Wallace	Richard Petty Motorsports	Chevrolet	331	13
25	27	34	Michael McDowell	Front Row Motorsports	Ford	329	12
26	34	53	J. J. Yeley (i)	Rick Ware Racing	Ford	329	0
27	32	00	Landon Cassill (i)	StarCom Racing	Chevrolet	328	0
28	3	11	Denny Hamlin	Joe Gibbs Racing	Toyota	328	9
29	38	15	Joe Nemechek (i)	Premium Motorsports	Chevrolet	327	0
30	39	51	Josh Bilicki (i)	Petty Ware Racing	Chevrolet	323	0
31	35	27	Ross Chastain (i)	Premium Motorsports	Chevrolet	319	0
32	14	9	Chase Elliott	Hendrick Motorsports	Chevrolet	312	5
33	37	77	Quin Houff	Spire Motorsports	Chevrolet	202	4
34	23	48	Jimmie Johnson	Hendrick Motorsports	Chevrolet	199	11
35	26	38	David Ragan	Front Row Motorsports	Ford	189	2
36	36	52	Garrett Smithley (i)	Rick Ware Racing	Ford	188	0
37	40	66	Timmy Hill (i)	MBM Motorsports	Toyota	156	0
38	33	32	Corey LaJoie	Go Fas Racing	Ford	67	1
39	8	2	Brad Keselowski	Team Penske	Ford	52	1
40	9	17	Ricky Stenhouse Jr.	Roush Fenway Racing	Ford	52	1
Official race results

=== Race statistics ===
- Lead changes: 26 among 11 different drivers
- Cautions/Laps: 11 for 56
- Red flags: 0
- Time of race: 3 hours, 44 minutes and 44 seconds
- Average speed: 133.759 miles per hour (215.264 km/h)

== Media ==
=== Television ===
NBC Sports covered the race on the television side. Rick Allen, Two–time Texas winner Jeff Burton, Steve Letarte and 2000 Texas winner Dale Earnhardt Jr. had the call in the booth for the race. Dave Burns, Marty Snider and Kelli Stavast reported from pit lane during the race.

NBCSN
Booth announcers	Pit reporters
Lap-by-lap: Rick Allen; Color-commentator: Jeff Burton; Color-commentator: Steve Letarte; Color-commentator: Dale Earnhardt Jr.	Dave Burns; Marty Snider; Kelli Stavast

=== Radio ===
PRN covered their final 2019 broadcast, which was simulcast on Sirius XM NASCAR Radio. Doug Rice & Mark Garrow covered the action for PRN when the field raced down the front straightaway. Doug Turnbull covered the action for PRN from a platform outside of Turns 1 &2, & Pat Patterson covered the action from a platform outside of Turns 3 &4 for PRN. Brad Gillie, Brett McMillan, Wendy Venturini and Heather DeBeaux had the call from pit lane for PRN.

PRN
Booth announcers	Turn announcers	Pit reporters
Lead announcer: Doug Rice; Announcer: Mark Garrow	Turns 1 & 2: Doug Turnbull; Turns 3 & 4: Pat Patterson	Brad Gillie; Brett McMillan; Wendy Venturini; Heather DeBeaux

== Standings after the race ==
	Pos	Driver	Points
	1	Martin Truex Jr.	4,133
3	2	Kevin Harvick	4,113 (–20)
	3	Kyle Busch	4,113 (–20)
	4	Joey Logano	4,111 (–20)
3	5	Denny Hamlin	4,091 (–20)
	6	Ryan Blaney	4,088 (–23)
	7	Kyle Larson	4,088 (–23)
	8	Chase Elliott	4,033 (–78)
	9	Brad Keselowski	2,265 (–1,868)
	10	William Byron	2,247 (–1,886)
	11	Clint Bowyer	2,225 (–1,908)
	12	Alex Bowman	2,215 (–1,918)
1	13	Aric Almirola	2,204 (–1,929)
1	14	Kurt Busch	2,193 (–1,940)
	15	Ryan Newman	2,170 (–1,963)
	16	Erik Jones	2,127 (–2,006)
Official driver's standings

Manufacturers' Championship standings

Pos	Manufacturer	Points
1	Toyota	1,238
2	Ford	1,201 (–37)
3	Chevrolet	1,160 (–78)

- Note: Only the first 16 positions are included for the driver standings.

Previous race: 2019 First Data 500	Monster Energy NASCAR Cup Series; 2019 season	Next race: 2019 Bluegreen Vacations 500
