= 2000 Marlboro 500 =

The layout of California Speedway, the venue where the race was held.

The 2000 Marlboro 500 Presented By Toyota was a CART racing event scheduled for October 29, 2000 at California Speedway in Fontana, California, USA. Inclement weather, however, forced race officials to call a halt to the race and it was finished the next day. It was the final race of the FedEx Championship Series for the season.

The race was won by Christian Fittipaldi, driving the #11 Kmart/Route 66 Newman/Haas Racing Lola-Ford. It was his second and final career victory in the CART series.

== Media coverage ==
The race was carried on ESPN as part of its SpeedWorld series of motorsports coverage. Paul Page was the lap-by-lap commentator with Parker Johnstone as analyst. Gary Gerould, Jon Beekhuis, and Rick DeBruhl were on pit road.

== Background ==
This was the first CART event at California Speedway since Greg Moore was killed in a major accident during the same race a year earlier. In the interim period, track management pulled up the grass along the backstretch and paved over the entire area. In addition, tire barriers were placed along the retaining wall where Moore's accident had occurred to protect from potential catastrophic damage.

=== Championship ===
Entering the race, the points race was tight and several drivers were able to contend for the championship. The points leader was Gil de Ferran, driving the #2 Marlboro Team Penske Reynard-Honda. Adrian Fernandez, the defending winner of the Marlboro 500 in the #40 Tecate/Quaker State Reynard-Ford for Patrick Racing was second place by five points. Fernandez had also won the previous week's event in Australia, while de Ferran was taken out in a crash on lap 1 with 1999 series champion Juan Pablo Montoya.

Further back, but needing help, were Paul Tracy in the Team KOOL Green #26 Reynard-Honda and rookie Kenny Brack in the Shell Oil #8 Team Rahal Reynard-Ford. Tied for third, nineteen points behind de Ferran, they would both have needed to score the maximum number of points available in the race and have de Ferran and Fernandez both finish without recording a point. Tracy had also been involved in a wreck in the Australia race, as Oriol Servia hopped a curb in a chicane at the Surfer's Paradise street course and T-boned the #26; Tracy had been running second in series points entering the event.

For the first time in four seasons, a new championship team was guaranteed to be crowned. Target Chip Ganassi Racing, which had won the last four CART titles with Jimmy Vasser, Alex Zanardi, and Montoya, entered the race with both Vasser and defending series champion Montoya far out of title contention; Vasser was 22 points behind de Ferran and Montoya 30, and neither driver would have been able to catch him.
