= 2005 Banquet 400 =

2005 Banquet 400 presented by ConAgra Foods
Race details
- Race 30 of 36 in the 2005 NASCAR Nextel Cup Series
- The 2005 Banquet 400 program cover, featuring Rusty Wallace and Carl Edwards.
- Date: October 9, 2005
- Official name: Fifth Annual Banquet 400 presented by ConAgra Foods
- Location: Kansas City, Kansas, Kansas Speedway
- Course: Permanent racing facility
- Course length: 1.5 miles (2.41 km)
- Distance: 267 laps, 400.5 mi (644.542 km)
- Scheduled distance: 267 laps, 400.5 mi (644.542 km)
- Average speed: 137.774 miles per hour (221.726 km/h)
- Attendance: 125,000

Pole position
Driver	Matt Kenseth	Roush Racing
- Time: 29.858

Most laps led
Driver	Mark Martin	Roush Racing
- Laps: 139

Winner
No. 6	Mark Martin	Roush Racing

Television in the United States
- Network: NBC
- Announcers: Bill Weber, Benny Parsons, Wally Dallenbach Jr.

Radio in the United States
- Radio: Motor Racing Network

The 2005 Banquet 400 presented by ConAgra Foods was the 30th stock car racing race of the 2005 NASCAR Nextel Cup Series season, the fourth race of the 2005 Chase for the Nextel Cup, and the fifth iteration of the event. The race was held on Sunday, October 9, 2005, before a crowd of 125,000 in Kansas City, Kansas, at Kansas Speedway, a 1.5 miles (2.4 km) permanent D-shaped oval racetrack. The race took the scheduled 267 laps to complete. At race's end, Mark Martin of Roush Racing would take control of the race in the late stages to win his 35th career NASCAR Nextel Cup Series win and his first and only win of the season. To fill out the podium, teammates Greg Biffle and Carl Edwards would finish second and third, respectively.

The race was the NASCAR Nextel Cup Series debut for Denny Hamlin.

== Background ==
The layout of Kansas Speedway, the venue where the race was held.

Kansas Speedway is a 1.5-mile (2.4 km) tri-oval race track in Kansas City, Kansas. It was built in 2001 and hosts two annual NASCAR race weekends. The NTT IndyCar Series also raced there until 2011. The speedway is owned and operated by the International Speedway Corporation.

=== Entry list ===
#	Driver	Team	Make	Sponsor
0	Mike Bliss	Haas CNC Racing	Chevrolet	NetZero, Best Buy
00	Carl Long	McGlynn Racing	Chevrolet	Polly Klaas Foundation, Royal Administration Services
01	Joe Nemechek	MB2 Motorsports	Chevrolet	U. S. Army
2	Rusty Wallace	Penske Racing	Dodge	Miller Lite
02	Brandon Ash	Ash Motorsports	Dodge	Stricker's Auction Company
4	Mike Wallace	Morgan–McClure Motorsports	Chevrolet	Lucas Oil, Wide Open Energy Drink
5	Kyle Busch	Hendrick Motorsports	Chevrolet	Carquest
6	Mark Martin	Roush Racing	Ford	Viagra
7	Robby Gordon	Robby Gordon Motorsports	Chevrolet	Harrah's
07	Dave Blaney	Richard Childress Racing	Chevrolet	Jack Daniel's
8	Dale Earnhardt Jr.	Dale Earnhardt, Inc.	Chevrolet	Budweiser
9	Kasey Kahne	Evernham Motorsports	Dodge	Dodge Dealers, UAW
10	Scott Riggs	MBV Motorsports	Chevrolet	Valvoline
11	Denny Hamlin	Joe Gibbs Racing	Chevrolet	FedEx Kinko's
12	Ryan Newman	Penske Racing	Dodge	Alltel
13	Greg Sacks	Sacks Motorsports	Dodge	Sacks Motorsports
15	Michael Waltrip	Dale Earnhardt, Inc.	Chevrolet	NAPA Auto Parts
16	Greg Biffle	Roush Racing	Ford	National Guard
17	Matt Kenseth	Roush Racing	Ford	DeWalt
18	Bobby Labonte	Joe Gibbs Racing	Chevrolet	Interstate Batteries
19	Jeremy Mayfield	Evernham Motorsports	Dodge	Dodge Dealers, Mountain Dew Pitch Black
20	Tony Stewart	Joe Gibbs Racing	Chevrolet	The Home Depot
21	Ricky Rudd	Wood Brothers Racing	Ford	Motorcraft Genuine Parts
22	Scott Wimmer	Bill Davis Racing	Dodge	Caterpillar
24	Jeff Gordon	Hendrick Motorsports	Chevrolet	DuPont
25	Brian Vickers	Hendrick Motorsports	Chevrolet	GMAC, ditech.com
29	Kevin Harvick	Richard Childress Racing	Chevrolet	GM Goodwrench
31	Jeff Burton	Richard Childress Racing	Chevrolet	Cingular Wireless
32	Bobby Hamilton Jr.	PPI Motorsports	Chevrolet	Tide
34	Eric McClure	Mach 1 Motorsports	Chevrolet	Oak Glove Company
36	Boris Said	MB Sutton Motorsports	Chevrolet	Centrix Financial
37	Tony Raines	R&J Racing	Dodge	BoSPOKER
38	Elliott Sadler	Robert Yates Racing	Ford	M&M's
40	Sterling Marlin	Chip Ganassi Racing with Felix Sabates	Dodge	Coors Light
41	Casey Mears	Chip Ganassi Racing with Felix Sabates	Dodge	Target, Breast Cancer Research Foundation
42	Jamie McMurray	Chip Ganassi Racing with Felix Sabates	Dodge	Texaco, Havoline
43	Jeff Green	Petty Enterprises	Dodge	Cheerios, Betty Crocker
44	Terry Labonte	Hendrick Motorsports	Chevrolet	Kellogg's
45	Kyle Petty	Petty Enterprises	Dodge	Georgia-Pacific Quilted Northern
48	Jimmie Johnson	Hendrick Motorsports	Chevrolet	Lowe's
49	Ken Schrader	BAM Racing	Dodge	Schwan's Home Service
51	Stuart Kirby	Competitive Edge Motorsports	Chevrolet	Marathon American Spirit Motor Oil
61	Wayne Anderson	Buddy Sisco Racing	Dodge	Buddy Sisco Racing
66	Kevin Lepage	Peak Fitness Racing	Ford	Peak Fitness, EAS
77	Travis Kvapil	Penske Racing	Dodge	Kodak Mammography Film, Jasper Engines & Transmissions
78	Kenny Wallace*	Furniture Row Racing	Chevrolet	Furniture Row
88	Dale Jarrett	Robert Yates Racing	Ford	UPS
92	P. J. Jones	Front Row Motorsports	Chevrolet	Harrah's, FOX Collision
97	Kurt Busch	Roush Racing	Ford	Sharpie
99	Carl Edwards	Roush Racing	Ford	Office Depot
Official entry list

== Practice ==
=== First practice ===
The first practice session was held on Friday, October 7, at 12:30 PM CST, and would last for one hour. Scott Wimmer of Bill Davis Racing would set the fastest time in the session, with a 30.289 and an average speed of 178.283 miles per hour (286.919 km/h).

Pos.	#	Driver	Team	Make	Time	Speed
1	22	Scott Wimmer	Bill Davis Racing	Dodge	30.289	178.283
2	97	Kurt Busch	Roush Racing	Ford	30.397	177.649
3	17	Matt Kenseth	Roush Racing	Ford	30.427	177.474
Full first practice results

=== Second and final practice ===
The second and final practice session, sometimes known as Happy Hour, was held on Friday, October 7, at 2:35 PM CST, and would last for one hour and 20 minutes. Elliott Sadler of Robert Yates Racing would set the fastest time in the session, with a 30.105 and an average speed of 179.372 miles per hour (288.671 km/h).

Pos.	#	Driver	Team	Make	Time	Speed
1	38	Elliott Sadler	Robert Yates Racing	Ford	30.105	179.372
2	99	Carl Edwards	Roush Racing	Ford	30.114	179.319
3	17	Matt Kenseth	Roush Racing	Ford	30.167	179.004
Full Happy Hour practice results

== Qualifying ==
Qualifying was held on Saturday, October 8, at 10:40 AM CST. Each driver would have two laps to set a fastest time; the fastest of the two would count as their official qualifying lap.

Matt Kenseth of Roush Racing would win the pole, with a 29.858 and an average speed of 180.856 miles per hour (291.060 km/h).

Two drivers would crash in qualifying: debuter Denny Hamlin would crash on his second lap coming into Turn 3, and Kasey Kahne would crash on his warm-up lap coming into the frontstretch. While both drivers would qualify on owner's points, they would both have to start at the back for the race due to switching to a backup car.

Six drivers would fail to qualify: Robby Gordon, Carl Long, Wayne Anderson, Tony Raines, Eric McClure, and P. J. Jones.

=== Full qualifying results ===
Pos.	#	Driver	Team	Make	Time	Speed
1	17	Matt Kenseth	Roush Racing	Ford	29.858	180.856
2	38	Elliott Sadler	Robert Yates Racing	Ford	29.881	180.717
3	24	Jeff Gordon	Hendrick Motorsports	Chevrolet	29.922	180.469
4	22	Scott Wimmer	Bill Davis Racing	Dodge	29.923	180.463
5	99	Carl Edwards	Roush Racing	Ford	29.931	180.415
6	66	Kevin Lepage	Peak Fitness Racing	Ford	29.938	180.373
7	11	Denny Hamlin	Joe Gibbs Racing	Chevrolet	29.950	180.301
8	16	Greg Biffle	Roush Racing	Ford	30.014	179.916
9	20	Tony Stewart	Joe Gibbs Racing	Chevrolet	30.025	179.850
10	97	Kurt Busch	Roush Racing	Ford	30.060	179.641
11	12	Ryan Newman	Penske Racing	Dodge	30.087	179.480
12	43	Jeff Green	Petty Enterprises	Dodge	30.090	179.462
13	40	Sterling Marlin	Chip Ganassi Racing with Felix Sabates	Dodge	30.094	179.438
14	19	Jeremy Mayfield	Evernham Motorsports	Dodge	30.106	179.366
15	4	Mike Wallace	Morgan–McClure Motorsports	Chevrolet	30.117	179.301
16	01	Joe Nemechek	MB2 Motorsports	Chevrolet	30.122	179.271
17	25	Brian Vickers	Hendrick Motorsports	Chevrolet	30.164	179.021
18	02	Brandon Ash	Ash Motorsports	Dodge	30.165	179.015
19	6	Mark Martin	Roush Racing	Ford	30.172	178.974
20	29	Kevin Harvick	Richard Childress Racing	Chevrolet	30.173	178.968
21	5	Kyle Busch	Hendrick Motorsports	Chevrolet	30.177	178.944
22	48	Jimmie Johnson	Hendrick Motorsports	Chevrolet	30.192	178.855
23	45	Kyle Petty	Petty Enterprises	Dodge	30.196	178.832
24	49	Ken Schrader	BAM Racing	Dodge	30.216	178.713
25	32	Bobby Hamilton Jr.	PPI Motorsports	Chevrolet	30.232	178.619
26	07	Dave Blaney	Richard Childress Racing	Chevrolet	30.250	178.512
27	92	P. J. Jones	Front Row Motorsports	Dodge	30.261	178.447
28	0	Mike Bliss	Haas CNC Racing	Chevrolet	30.264	178.430
29	21	Ricky Rudd	Wood Brothers Racing	Ford	30.296	178.241
30	42	Jamie McMurray	Chip Ganassi Racing with Felix Sabates	Dodge	30.302	178.206
31	88	Dale Jarrett	Robert Yates Racing	Ford	30.317	178.118
32	36	Boris Said	MB Sutton Motorsports	Chevrolet	30.317	178.118
33	2	Rusty Wallace	Penske Racing	Dodge	30.334	178.018
34	41	Casey Mears	Chip Ganassi Racing with Felix Sabates	Dodge	30.336	178.006
35	44	Terry Labonte	Hendrick Motorsports	Chevrolet	30.361	177.860
36	15	Michael Waltrip	Dale Earnhardt, Inc.	Chevrolet	30.382	177.737
37	77	Travis Kvapil	Penske Racing	Dodge	30.388	177.702
38	8	Dale Earnhardt Jr.	Dale Earnhardt, Inc.	Chevrolet	30.420	177.515
39	18	Bobby Labonte	Joe Gibbs Racing	Chevrolet	30.482	177.154
40	31	Jeff Burton	Richard Childress Racing	Chevrolet	30.593	176.511
Qualified on owner's points
41	10	Scott Riggs	MBV Motorsports	Chevrolet	30.743	175.650
42	9	Kasey Kahne	Evernham Motorsports	Dodge	—	—
Last car to qualify on time
43	51	Stuart Kirby	Competitive Edge Motorsports	Chevrolet	30.390	177.690
Failed to qualify or withdrew
44	7	Robby Gordon	Robby Gordon Motorsports	Chevrolet	30.546	176.783
45	00	Carl Long	McGlynn Racing	Dodge	30.635	176.269
46	61	Wayne Anderson	Buddy Sisco Racing	Dodge	30.685	175.982
47	37	Tony Raines	R&J Racing	Dodge	30.762	175.541
48	34	Eric McClure	Mach 1 Motorsports	Chevrolet	30.821	175.205
49	13	Greg Sacks	Sacks Motorsports	Dodge	31.159	173.305
WD	78	Kenny Wallace	Furniture Row Racing	Chevrolet	—	—
Official qualifying results

== Race results ==
Fin	St	#	Driver	Team	Make	Laps	Led	Status	Pts	Winnings
1	19	6	Mark Martin	Roush Racing	Ford	267	139	running	190	$339,725
2	8	16	Greg Biffle	Roush Racing	Ford	267	47	running	175	$210,025
3	5	99	Carl Edwards	Roush Racing	Ford	267	1	running	170	$176,625
4	9	20	Tony Stewart	Joe Gibbs Racing	Chevrolet	267	1	running	165	$179,836
5	1	17	Matt Kenseth	Roush Racing	Ford	267	71	running	160	$174,111
6	22	48	Jimmie Johnson	Hendrick Motorsports	Chevrolet	267	1	running	155	$150,816
7	33	2	Rusty Wallace	Penske Racing	Dodge	267	1	running	151	$145,683
8	34	41	Casey Mears	Chip Ganassi Racing with Felix Sabates	Dodge	267	0	running	142	$129,708
9	29	21	Ricky Rudd	Wood Brothers Racing	Ford	267	0	running	138	$125,564
10	3	24	Jeff Gordon	Hendrick Motorsports	Chevrolet	267	0	running	134	$142,711
11	17	25	Brian Vickers	Hendrick Motorsports	Chevrolet	267	0	running	130	$102,225
12	2	38	Elliott Sadler	Robert Yates Racing	Ford	267	0	running	127	$138.516
13	13	40	Sterling Marlin	Chip Ganassi Racing with Felix Sabates	Dodge	267	0	running	124	$121,283
14	10	97	Kurt Busch	Roush Racing	Ford	267	0	running	121	$138,425
15	28	0	Mike Bliss	Haas CNC Racing	Chevrolet	267	0	running	118	$92,300
16	14	19	Jeremy Mayfield	Evernham Motorsports	Dodge	267	2	running	120	$115,245
17	24	49	Ken Schrader	BAM Racing	Dodge	267	0	running	112	$88,200
18	30	42	Jamie McMurray	Chip Ganassi Racing with Felix Sabates	Dodge	267	0	running	109	$95,400
19	42	9	Kasey Kahne	Evernham Motorsports	Dodge	267	0	running	106	$118,775
20	16	01	Joe Nemechek	MB2 Motorsports	Chevrolet	267	0	running	103	$112,208
21	21	5	Kyle Busch	Hendrick Motorsports	Chevrolet	267	0	running	100	$94,800
22	37	77	Travis Kvapil	Penske Racing	Dodge	267	1	running	102	$92,600
23	11	12	Ryan Newman	Penske Racing	Dodge	267	0	running	94	$125,591
24	20	29	Kevin Harvick	Richard Childress Racing	Chevrolet	267	1	running	96	$127,866
25	26	07	Dave Blaney	Richard Childress Racing	Chevrolet	267	0	running	88	$91,075
26	12	43	Jeff Green	Petty Enterprises	Dodge	266	0	running	85	$110,911
27	4	22	Scott Wimmer	Bill Davis Racing	Dodge	266	0	running	82	$103,433
28	40	31	Jeff Burton	Richard Childress Racing	Chevrolet	266	1	running	84	$106,920
29	23	45	Kyle Petty	Petty Enterprises	Dodge	266	0	running	76	$92,033
30	41	10	Scott Riggs	MBV Motorsports	Chevrolet	265	0	running	73	$97,672
31	32	36	Boris Said	MB Sutton Motorsports	Chevrolet	265	0	running	70	$76,925
32	7	11	Denny Hamlin	Joe Gibbs Racing	Chevrolet	265	0	running	67	$76,725
33	35	44	Terry Labonte	Hendrick Motorsports	Chevrolet	265	0	running	64	$77,475
34	38	8	Dale Earnhardt Jr.	Dale Earnhardt, Inc.	Chevrolet	265	0	running	61	$123,733
35	15	4	Mike Wallace	Morgan–McClure Motorsports	Chevrolet	263	1	running	63	$76,125
36	6	66	Kevin Lepage	Peak Fitness Racing	Ford	263	0	running	0	$75,925
37	43	51	Stuart Kirby	Competitive Edge Motorsports	Chevrolet	263	0	running	52	$75,700
38	31	88	Dale Jarrett	Robert Yates Racing	Ford	258	0	running	49	$109,658
39	39	18	Bobby Labonte	Joe Gibbs Racing	Chevrolet	222	0	crash	46	$109,875
40	36	15	Michael Waltrip	Dale Earnhardt, Inc.	Chevrolet	215	0	engine	43	$102,314
41	27	92	P. J. Jones	Front Row Motorsports	Dodge	184	0	handling	40	$74,875
42	18	02	Brandon Ash	Ash Motorsports	Dodge	161	0	rear end	37	$74,690
43	25	32	Bobby Hamilton Jr.	PPI Motorsports	Chevrolet	63	0	engine	34	$74,841
Failed to qualify or withdrew
44		7	Robby Gordon	Robby Gordon Motorsports	Chevrolet					
45		00	Carl Long	McGlynn Racing	Dodge					
46		61	Wayne Anderson	Buddy Sisco Racing	Dodge					
47		37	Tony Raines	R&J Racing	Dodge					
48		34	Eric McClure	Mach 1 Motorsports	Chevrolet					
49		13	Greg Sacks	Sacks Motorsports	Dodge					
WD		78	Kenny Wallace	Furniture Row Racing	Chevrolet					
Official race results

Previous race: 2005 UAW-Ford 500	NASCAR Nextel Cup Series; 2005 season	Next race: 2005 UAW-GM Quality 500
