= 2005 New England 300 =

Race details
- Race 19 of 36 in the 2005 NASCAR Nextel Cup Series
- The 2005 New England 300 program cover, featuring Kurt Busch, winner of the 2004 race.
- Date: July 17, 2005
- Official name: 13th Annual New England 300
- Location: Loudon, New Hampshire, New Hampshire International Speedway
- Course: Permanent racing facility
- Course length: 1.058 miles (1.703 km)
- Distance: 300 laps, 317.4 mi (510.805 km)
- Scheduled distance: 300 laps, 317.4 mi (510.805 km)
- Average speed: 102.608 miles per hour (165.132 km/h)
- Attendance: 100,000

Pole position
| Driver | Brian Vickers | Hendrick Motorsports |
- Time: 29.225

Most laps led
| Driver | Tony Stewart | Joe Gibbs Racing |
- Laps: 232

Winner
| No. 20 | Tony Stewart | Joe Gibbs Racing |

Television in the United States
- Network: TNT
- Announcers: Bill Weber, Benny Parsons, Wally Dallenbach

Radio in the United States
- Radio: Motor Racing Network

The 2005 New England 300 was the 19th stock car racing race of the 2005 NASCAR Nextel Cup Series season and the 13th iteration of the event. The race was held on Sunday, July 17, 2005, before a crowd of 100,000 in Loudon, New Hampshire at New Hampshire International Speedway, a 1.058 miles (1.703 km) permanent, oval-shaped, low-banked racetrack. The race took the scheduled 300 laps to complete. At race's end, Tony Stewart of Joe Gibbs Racing would dominate the race to take his 22nd career NASCAR Nextel Cup Series win and his third of the season. To fill out the podium, Kurt Busch of Roush Racing and Bobby Labonte of Joe Gibbs Racing would finish second and third, respectively.

== Background ==
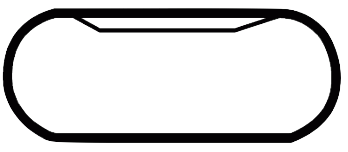
The layout of New Hampshire International Raceway, the venue where the race was held.

New Hampshire International Speedway is a 1.058-mile (1.703 km) oval speedway located in Loudon, New Hampshire which has hosted NASCAR racing annually since the early 1990s, as well as an IndyCar weekend and the oldest motorcycle race in North America, the Loudon Classic. Nicknamed "The Magic Mile", the speedway is often converted into a 1.6-mile (2.6 km) road course, which includes much of the oval. The track was originally the site of Bryar Motorsports Park before being purchased and redeveloped by Bob Bahre. The track is currently one of eight major NASCAR tracks owned and operated by Speedway Motorsports.

=== Entry list ===
| # | Driver | Team | Make | Sponsor |
|---|---|---|---|---|
| 0 | Mike Bliss | Haas CNC Racing | Chevrolet | NetZero, Best Buy |
| 00 | Carl Long | McGlynn Racing | Chevrolet | Buyers Choice Auto Warranties |
| 01 | Joe Nemechek | MB2 Motorsports | Chevrolet | U. S. Army |
| 2 | Rusty Wallace | Penske Racing | Dodge | Miller Lite |
| 4 | Mike Wallace | Morgan–McClure Motorsports | Chevrolet | Lucas Oil, Wide Open Energy Drink |
| 5 | Kyle Busch | Hendrick Motorsports | Chevrolet | Kellogg's |
| 6 | Mark Martin | Roush Racing | Ford | Viagra |
| 7 | Robby Gordon | Robby Gordon Motorsports | Chevrolet | Harrah's |
| 07 | Dave Blaney | Richard Childress Racing | Chevrolet | Jack Daniel's |
| 8 | Dale Earnhardt Jr. | Dale Earnhardt, Inc. | Chevrolet | Budweiser |
| 9 | Kasey Kahne | Evernham Motorsports | Dodge | Dodge Dealers, UAW |
| 10 | Scott Riggs | MBV Motorsports | Chevrolet | Valvoline |
| 11 | Jason Leffler | Joe Gibbs Racing | Chevrolet | FedEx Ground |
| 12 | Ryan Newman | Penske Racing | Dodge | Alltel |
| 15 | Michael Waltrip | Dale Earnhardt, Inc. | Chevrolet | NAPA Auto Parts |
| 16 | Greg Biffle | Roush Racing | Ford | Post-it Notes, National Guard |
| 17 | Matt Kenseth | Roush Racing | Ford | DeWalt |
| 18 | Bobby Labonte | Joe Gibbs Racing | Chevrolet | Interstate Batteries |
| 19 | Jeremy Mayfield | Evernham Motorsports | Dodge | Dodge Dealers, UAW |
| 20 | Tony Stewart | Joe Gibbs Racing | Chevrolet | The Home Depot |
| 21 | Ricky Rudd | Wood Brothers Racing | Ford | Motorcraft Genuine Parts |
| 22 | Scott Wimmer | Bill Davis Racing | Dodge | Caterpillar |
| 24 | Jeff Gordon | Hendrick Motorsports | Chevrolet | DuPont |
| 25 | Brian Vickers | Hendrick Motorsports | Chevrolet | ditech.com, GMAC |
| 27 | Ted Christopher | Kirk Shelmerdine Racing | Ford | Freddie B's |
| 29 | Kevin Harvick | Richard Childress Racing | Chevrolet | GM Goodwrench |
| 31 | Jeff Burton | Richard Childress Racing | Chevrolet | Cingular Wireless |
| 32 | Bobby Hamilton Jr. | PPI Motorsports | Chevrolet | Tide |
| 34 | Joey McCarthy | Mach 1 Motorsports | Chevrolet | Mach One Inc. |
| 37 | Kevin Lepage | R&J Racing | Dodge | BOSpoker |
| 38 | Elliott Sadler | Robert Yates Racing | Ford | M&M's |
| 40 | Sterling Marlin | Chip Ganassi Racing with Felix Sabates | Dodge | Coors Light |
| 41 | Casey Mears | Chip Ganassi Racing with Felix Sabates | Dodge | Target |
| 42 | Jamie McMurray | Chip Ganassi Racing with Felix Sabates | Dodge | Texaco, Havoline |
| 43 | Jeff Green | Petty Enterprises | Dodge | Cheerios, Betty Crocker |
| 45 | Kyle Petty | Petty Enterprises | Dodge | Georgia-Pacific, Brawny |
| 48 | Jimmie Johnson | Hendrick Motorsports | Chevrolet | Lowe's |
| 49 | Ken Schrader | BAM Racing | Dodge | Schwan's Home Service |
| 52 | Derrike Cope | Rick Ware Racing | Dodge | Pro30 |
| 66 | Mike Garvey | Peak Fitness Racing | Ford | Jani-King |
| 75 | Wayne Anderson | Rinaldi Racing | Dodge | R & D Theil |
| 77 | Travis Kvapil | Penske Racing | Dodge | Kodak, Jasper Engines & Transmissions |
| 88 | Dale Jarrett | Robert Yates Racing | Ford | UPS |
| 89 | Morgan Shepherd | Shepherd Racing Ventures | Dodge | Cornerstone Bancard, Victory in Jesus |
| 92 | Hermie Sadler | Front Row Motorsports | Chevrolet | Front Row Motorsports |
| 97 | Kurt Busch | Roush Racing | Ford | Irwin Industrial Tools |
| 99 | Carl Edwards | Roush Racing | Ford | Office Depot |
Official entry list

== Practice ==
=== First practice ===
The first one-hour practice session would take place on Friday, July 15, at 12:10 PM EST. Mark Martin of Roush Racing would set the fastest time in the session, with a lap of 29.418 and an average speed of 129.472 miles per hour (208.365 km/h).

| Pos. | # | Driver | Team | Make | Time | Speed |
|---|---|---|---|---|---|---|
| 1 | 6 | Mark Martin | Roush Racing | Ford | 29.418 | 129.472 |
| 2 | 12 | Ryan Newman | Penske Racing | Dodge | 29.468 | 129.252 |
| 3 | 01 | Joe Nemechek | MB2 Motorsports | Chevrolet | 29.576 | 128.780 |
Full first practice results

=== Second and final practice ===
The second and final one-hour practice session would take place on Friday, July 15, at 3:50 PM EST. Ryan Newman of Penske Racing would set the fastest time in the session, with a lap of 29.086 and an average speed of 130.950 miles per hour (210.744 km/h).

| Pos. | # | Driver | Team | Make | Time | Speed |
|---|---|---|---|---|---|---|
| 1 | 12 | Ryan Newman | Penske Racing | Dodge | 29.086 | 130.950 |
| 2 | 9 | Kasey Kahne | Evernham Motorsports | Dodge | 29.121 | 130.792 |
| 3 | 5 | Kyle Busch | Hendrick Motorsports | Chevrolet | 29.229 | 130.309 |
Full final practice results

== Qualifying ==
Qualifying would take place on Saturday, July 16, at 12:10 PM EST. Each driver would have two laps to set a fastest time; the fastest of the two would count as their official qualifying lap.

Brian Vickers of Hendrick Motorsports would win the pole, setting a time of 29.225 and an average speed of 130.327 miles per hour (209.741 km/h).

Carl Long of McGlynn Racing would crash during his second lap. While he had crashed, he had set a lap time fast enough in the first lap to get him into the race, and therefore was able to still compete, albeit at the rear due to switching to a backup car.

Four drivers would fail to qualify: Joey McCarthy, Derrike Cope, Wayne Peterson, and Hermie Sadler.

=== Full qualifying results ===
| Pos. | # | Driver | Team | Make | Time | Speed |
|---|---|---|---|---|---|---|
| 1 | 25 | Brian Vickers | Hendrick Motorsports | Chevrolet | 29.225 | 130.327 |
| 2 | 9 | Kasey Kahne | Evernham Motorsports | Dodge | 29.250 | 130.215 |
| 3 | 38 | Elliott Sadler | Robert Yates Racing | Ford | 29.346 | 129.789 |
| 4 | 12 | Ryan Newman | Penske Racing | Dodge | 29.349 | 129.776 |
| 5 | 97 | Kurt Busch | Roush Racing | Ford | 29.351 | 129.767 |
| 6 | 2 | Rusty Wallace | Penske Racing | Dodge | 29.358 | 129.736 |
| 7 | 5 | Kyle Busch | Hendrick Motorsports | Chevrolet | 29.363 | 129.714 |
| 8 | 29 | Kevin Harvick | Richard Childress Racing | Chevrolet | 29.370 | 129.683 |
| 9 | 16 | Greg Biffle | Roush Racing | Ford | 29.385 | 129.617 |
| 10 | 18 | Bobby Labonte | Joe Gibbs Racing | Chevrolet | 29.390 | 129.595 |
| 11 | 19 | Jeremy Mayfield | Evernham Motorsports | Dodge | 29.425 | 129.441 |
| 12 | 48 | Jimmie Johnson | Hendrick Motorsports | Chevrolet | 29.443 | 129.362 |
| 13 | 20 | Tony Stewart | Joe Gibbs Racing | Chevrolet | 29.458 | 129.296 |
| 14 | 21 | Ricky Rudd | Wood Brothers Racing | Ford | 29.491 | 129.151 |
| 15 | 43 | Jeff Green | Petty Enterprises | Dodge | 29.521 | 129.020 |
| 16 | 17 | Matt Kenseth | Roush Racing | Ford | 29.522 | 129.016 |
| 17 | 42 | Jamie McMurray | Chip Ganassi Racing with Felix Sabates | Dodge | 29.566 | 128.824 |
| 18 | 0 | Mike Bliss | Haas CNC Racing | Chevrolet | 29.583 | 128.750 |
| 19 | 6 | Mark Martin | Roush Racing | Ford | 29.595 | 128.697 |
| 20 | 99 | Carl Edwards | Roush Racing | Ford | 29.608 | 128.641 |
| 21 | 24 | Jeff Gordon | Hendrick Motorsports | Chevrolet | 29.620 | 128.589 |
| 22 | 01 | Joe Nemechek | MB2 Motorsports | Chevrolet | 29.635 | 128.524 |
| 23 | 10 | Scott Riggs | MBV Motorsports | Chevrolet | 29.657 | 128.428 |
| 24 | 8 | Dale Earnhardt Jr. | Dale Earnhardt, Inc. | Chevrolet | 29.660 | 128.415 |
| 25 | 31 | Jeff Burton | Richard Childress Racing | Chevrolet | 29.677 | 128.342 |
| 26 | 41 | Casey Mears | Chip Ganassi Racing with Felix Sabates | Dodge | 29.678 | 128.337 |
| 27 | 11 | Jason Leffler | Joe Gibbs Racing | Chevrolet | 29.684 | 128.312 |
| 28 | 15 | Michael Waltrip | Dale Earnhardt, Inc. | Chevrolet | 29.767 | 127.954 |
| 29 | 40 | Sterling Marlin | Chip Ganassi Racing with Felix Sabates | Dodge | 29.768 | 127.949 |
| 30 | 77 | Travis Kvapil | Penske Racing | Dodge | 29.769 | 127.945 |
| 31 | 7 | Robby Gordon | Robby Gordon Motorsports | Chevrolet | 29.793 | 127.842 |
| 32 | 22 | Scott Wimmer | Bill Davis Racing | Dodge | 29.833 | 127.671 |
| 33 | 66 | Mike Garvey | Peak Fitness Racing | Ford | 29.869 | 127.517 |
| 34 | 88 | Dale Jarrett | Robert Yates Racing | Ford | 29.902 | 127.376 |
| 35 | 00 | Carl Long | McGlynn Racing | Chevrolet | 29.948 | 127.180 |
| 36 | 32 | Bobby Hamilton Jr. | PPI Motorsports | Chevrolet | 29.954 | 127.155 |
| 37 | 07 | Dave Blaney | Richard Childress Racing | Chevrolet | 29.958 | 127.138 |
| 38 | 27 | Ted Christopher | Kirk Shelmerdine Racing | Ford | 29.997 | 126.973 |
| 39 | 89 | Morgan Shepherd | Shepherd Racing Ventures | Dodge | 30.003 | 126.947 |
| 40 | 4 | Mike Wallace | Morgan–McClure Motorsports | Chevrolet | 30.011 | 126.913 |
Qualified by owner's points
| 41 | 49 | Ken Schrader | BAM Racing | Dodge | 30.266 | 125.844 |
| 42 | 45 | Kyle Petty | Petty Enterprises | Dodge | 30.426 | 125.182 |
Last car to qualify on time
| 43 | 37 | Kevin Lepage | R&J Racing | Dodge | 30.008 | 126.926 |
Failed to qualify
| 44 | 34 | Joey McCarthy | Mach 1 Motorsports | Chevrolet | 30.106 | 126.513 |
| 45 | 52 | Derrike Cope | Rick Ware Racing | Dodge | 30.198 | 126.128 |
| 46 | 75 | Wayne Anderson | Rinaldi Racing | Dodge | 30.256 | 125.886 |
| 47 | 92 | Hermie Sadler | Front Row Motorsports | Chevrolet | 30.626 | 124.365 |
Official qualifying results

== Race results ==
| Fin | St | # | Driver | Team | Make | Laps | Led | Status | Pts | Winnings |
|---|---|---|---|---|---|---|---|---|---|---|
| 1 | 13 | 20 | Tony Stewart | Joe Gibbs Racing | Chevrolet | 300 | 232 | running | 190 | $283,986 |
| 2 | 5 | 97 | Kurt Busch | Roush Racing | Ford | 300 | 6 | running | 175 | $205,050 |
| 3 | 10 | 18 | Bobby Labonte | Joe Gibbs Racing | Chevrolet | 300 | 0 | running | 165 | $159,600 |
| 4 | 7 | 5 | Kyle Busch | Hendrick Motorsports | Chevrolet | 300 | 0 | running | 160 | $117,475 |
| 5 | 9 | 16 | Greg Biffle | Roush Racing | Ford | 300 | 0 | running | 155 | $111,825 |
| 6 | 2 | 9 | Kasey Kahne | Evernham Motorsports | Dodge | 300 | 18 | running | 155 | $133,600 |
| 7 | 4 | 12 | Ryan Newman | Penske Racing | Dodge | 300 | 22 | running | 151 | $132,116 |
| 8 | 6 | 2 | Rusty Wallace | Penske Racing | Dodge | 300 | 0 | running | 142 | $113,933 |
| 9 | 24 | 8 | Dale Earnhardt Jr. | Dale Earnhardt, Inc. | Chevrolet | 300 | 0 | running | 138 | $126,508 |
| 10 | 16 | 17 | Matt Kenseth | Roush Racing | Ford | 300 | 0 | running | 134 | $127,486 |
| 11 | 1 | 25 | Brian Vickers | Hendrick Motorsports | Chevrolet | 300 | 10 | running | 135 | $94,300 |
| 12 | 20 | 99 | Carl Edwards | Roush Racing | Ford | 300 | 0 | running | 127 | $92,300 |
| 13 | 12 | 48 | Jimmie Johnson | Hendrick Motorsports | Chevrolet | 300 | 0 | running | 124 | $122,391 |
| 14 | 25 | 31 | Jeff Burton | Richard Childress Racing | Chevrolet | 300 | 0 | running | 121 | $102,445 |
| 15 | 19 | 6 | Mark Martin | Roush Racing | Ford | 300 | 0 | running | 118 | $90,400 |
| 16 | 34 | 88 | Dale Jarrett | Robert Yates Racing | Ford | 300 | 0 | running | 115 | $123,858 |
| 17 | 28 | 15 | Michael Waltrip | Dale Earnhardt, Inc. | Chevrolet | 300 | 0 | running | 112 | $102,764 |
| 18 | 22 | 01 | Joe Nemechek | MB2 Motorsports | Chevrolet | 300 | 0 | running | 109 | $100,108 |
| 19 | 11 | 19 | Jeremy Mayfield | Evernham Motorsports | Dodge | 299 | 0 | running | 106 | $99,995 |
| 20 | 37 | 07 | Dave Blaney | Richard Childress Racing | Chevrolet | 299 | 0 | running | 103 | $83,400 |
| 21 | 18 | 0 | Mike Bliss | Haas CNC Racing | Chevrolet | 299 | 0 | running | 100 | $73,025 |
| 22 | 8 | 29 | Kevin Harvick | Richard Childress Racing | Chevrolet | 299 | 0 | running | 97 | $116,261 |
| 23 | 14 | 21 | Ricky Rudd | Wood Brothers Racing | Ford | 299 | 0 | running | 94 | $100,689 |
| 24 | 27 | 11 | Jason Leffler | Joe Gibbs Racing | Chevrolet | 299 | 1 | running | 96 | $72,225 |
| 25 | 21 | 24 | Jeff Gordon | Hendrick Motorsports | Chevrolet | 299 | 0 | running | 88 | $117,861 |
| 26 | 41 | 49 | Ken Schrader | BAM Racing | Dodge | 299 | 0 | running | 85 | $71,725 |
| 27 | 30 | 77 | Travis Kvapil | Penske Racing | Dodge | 299 | 0 | running | 82 | $79,400 |
| 28 | 36 | 32 | Bobby Hamilton Jr. | PPI Motorsports | Chevrolet | 299 | 0 | running | 79 | $87,258 |
| 29 | 42 | 45 | Kyle Petty | Petty Enterprises | Dodge | 299 | 1 | running | 81 | $84,983 |
| 30 | 31 | 7 | Robby Gordon | Robby Gordon Motorsports | Chevrolet | 299 | 0 | running | 73 | $70,575 |
| 31 | 15 | 43 | Jeff Green | Petty Enterprises | Dodge | 298 | 1 | running | 75 | $96,311 |
| 32 | 23 | 10 | Scott Riggs | MBV Motorsports | Chevrolet | 298 | 0 | running | 67 | $86,808 |
| 33 | 26 | 41 | Casey Mears | Chip Ganassi Racing with Felix Sabates | Dodge | 298 | 0 | running | 64 | $85,447 |
| 34 | 29 | 40 | Sterling Marlin | Chip Ganassi Racing with Felix Sabates | Dodge | 298 | 0 | running | 61 | $94,658 |
| 35 | 32 | 22 | Scott Wimmer | Bill Davis Racing | Dodge | 297 | 9 | running | 63 | $74,550 |
| 36 | 33 | 66 | Mike Garvey | Peak Fitness Racing | Ford | 296 | 0 | running | 55 | $66,325 |
| 37 | 43 | 37 | Kevin Lepage | R&J Racing | Dodge | 296 | 0 | running | 52 | $66,125 |
| 38 | 40 | 4 | Mike Wallace | Morgan–McClure Motorsports | Chevrolet | 294 | 0 | running | 49 | $65,925 |
| 39 | 3 | 38 | Elliott Sadler | Robert Yates Racing | Ford | 233 | 0 | crash | 46 | $107,291 |
| 40 | 17 | 42 | Jamie McMurray | Chip Ganassi Racing with Felix Sabates | Dodge | 145 | 0 | crash | 43 | $73,650 |
| 41 | 39 | 89 | Morgan Shepherd | Shepherd Racing Ventures | Dodge | 99 | 0 | handling | 40 | $65,510 |
| 42 | 38 | 27 | Ted Christopher | Kirk Shelmerdine Racing | Ford | 29 | 0 | brakes | 37 | $65,385 |
| 43 | 35 | 00 | Carl Long | McGlynn Racing | Chevrolet | 8 | 0 | brakes | 34 | $65,586 |
Failed to qualify
| 44 | | 34 | Joey McCarthy | Mach 1 Motorsports | Chevrolet | | | | | |
| 45 | | 52 | Derrike Cope | Rick Ware Racing | Dodge | | | | | |
| 46 | | 75 | Wayne Anderson | Rinaldi Racing | Dodge | | | | | |
| 47 | | 92 | Hermie Sadler | Front Row Motorsports | Chevrolet | | | | | |
Official race results

| Previous race: 2005 USG Sheetrock 400 | NASCAR Nextel Cup Series; 2005 season | Next race: 2005 Pennsylvania 500 |
