= 2005 USG Sheetrock 400 =

18th race of the 2005 NASCAR Nextel Cup Series

Race details
- Race 18 of 36 in the 2005 NASCAR Nextel Cup Series
- The 2005 USG Sheetrock 400 program cover, paying tribute to Rusty Wallace's and Mark Martin's farewell seasons.
- Date: July 10, 2005
- Official name: 5th Annual USG Sheetrock 400
- Location: Joliet, Illinois, Chicagoland Speedway
- Course: Permanent racing facility
- Course length: 1.5 miles (2.41 km)
- Distance: 267 laps, 400.5 mi (644.542 km)
- Scheduled distance: 267 laps, 400.5 mi (644.542 km)
- Average speed: 127.638 miles per hour (205.413 km/h)
- Attendance: 80,000

Pole position
Driver	Jimmie Johnson	Hendrick Motorsports
- Time: 28.701

Most laps led
Driver	Matt Kenseth	Roush Racing
- Laps: 176

Winner
No. 8	Dale Earnhardt Jr.	Dale Earnhardt, Inc.

Television in the United States
- Network: NBC
- Announcers: Bill Weber, Benny Parsons, Wally Dallenbach Jr.

Radio in the United States
- Radio: Motor Racing Network

The 2005 USG Sheetrock 400 was the 18th stock car race of the 2005 NASCAR Nextel Cup Series season and the fifth iteration of the event. The race was held on Sunday, July 10, 2005, before a crowd of 80,000 in Joliet, Illinois, at Chicagoland Speedway, a 1.5 miles (2.41 km) tri-oval speedway. The race took the scheduled 267 laps to complete. At race's end, Dale Earnhardt Jr., driving for Dale Earnhardt, Inc., would have better pit strategy, taking only two tires to best eventual second-place finisher, Roush Racing driver Matt Kenseth. The win was Earnhardt Jr.'s 17th career NASCAR Nextel Cup Series win and his only win of the season. To fill out the podium, Jimmie Johnson, driving for Hendrick Motorsports, would finish third.

== Background ==
The layout of Chicagoland Speedway, the venue where the race was held.

Chicagoland Speedway is a 1.5 miles (2.41 km) tri-oval speedway in Joliet, Illinois, southwest of Chicago. The speedway opened in 2001 and currently hosts NASCAR racing. Until 2011, the speedway also hosted the IndyCar Series, recording numerous close finishes including the closest finish in IndyCar history. The speedway is owned and operated by International Speedway Corporation and located adjacent to Route 66 Raceway.

=== Entry list ===
- (R) denotes rookie driver.

#	Driver	Team	Make	Sponsor
0	Mike Bliss	Haas CNC Racing	Chevrolet	NetZero
00	Carl Long	McGlynn Racing	Dodge	Sunquest Vacations, Carloan.com
01	Joe Nemechek	MB2 Motorsports	Chevrolet	U. S. Army
2	Rusty Wallace	Penske Racing	Dodge	Miller Genuine Draft
4	Mike Wallace	Morgan–McClure Motorsports	Chevrolet	Lucas Oil
5	Kyle Busch	Hendrick Motorsports	Chevrolet	Kellogg's
6	Mark Martin	Roush Racing	Ford	Viagra
7	Robby Gordon	Robby Gordon Motorsports	Chevrolet	Menards
07	Dave Blaney	Richard Childress Racing	Chevrolet	Jack Daniel's
8	Dale Earnhardt Jr.	Dale Earnhardt, Inc.	Chevrolet	Budweiser, 2005 MLB All-Star Game
9	Kasey Kahne	Evernham Motorsports	Dodge	Dodge
10	Scott Riggs	MBV Motorsports	Chevrolet	Valvoline
11	Jason Leffler	Joe Gibbs Racing	Chevrolet	FedEx Express
12	Ryan Newman	Penske Racing	Dodge	Mobil 1, Speedpass
15	Michael Waltrip	Dale Earnhardt, Inc.	Chevrolet	NAPA Auto Parts
16	Greg Biffle	Roush Racing	Ford	Post-it
17	Matt Kenseth	Roush Racing	Ford	USG Sheetrock
18	Bobby Labonte	Joe Gibbs Racing	Chevrolet	Boniva
19	Jeremy Mayfield	Evernham Motorsports	Dodge	Dodge
20	Tony Stewart	Joe Gibbs Racing	Chevrolet	The Home Depot
21	Ricky Rudd	Wood Brothers Racing	Ford	Motorcraft
22	Scott Wimmer	Bill Davis Racing	Dodge	Caterpillar
24	Jeff Gordon	Hendrick Motorsports	Chevrolet	DuPont
25	Brian Vickers	Hendrick Motorsports	Chevrolet	GMAC, ditech.com
29	Kevin Harvick	Richard Childress Racing	Chevrolet	GM Goodwrench
31	Jeff Burton	Richard Childress Racing	Chevrolet	Bass Pro Shops, Tracker Boats
32	Bobby Hamilton Jr.	PPI Motorsports	Chevrolet	Tide
34	P. J. Jones	Mach 1 Motorsports	Chevrolet	Mach 1 Motorsports
37	Kevin Lepage	R&J Racing	Dodge	Patrón
38	Elliott Sadler	Robert Yates Racing	Ford	Combos
39	David Stremme	Chip Ganassi Racing	Dodge	U. S. Navy
40	Sterling Marlin	Chip Ganassi Racing with Felix Sabates	Dodge	Coors Light
41	Casey Mears	Chip Ganassi Racing with Felix Sabates	Dodge	Target
42	Jamie McMurray	Chip Ganassi Racing with Felix Sabates	Dodge	Home123
43	Jeff Green	Petty Enterprises	Dodge	Cheerios
44	Terry Labonte	Hendrick Motorsports	Chevrolet	Pizza Hut
45	Kyle Petty	Petty Enterprises	Dodge	Georgia-Pacific Brawny
48	Jimmie Johnson	Hendrick Motorsports	Chevrolet	Lowe's
49	Ken Schrader	BAM Racing	Dodge	Schwan's Home Service
51	Stuart Kirby	Competitive Edge Motorsports	Chevrolet	Marathon Multipower-3 HD Motor Oil
66	Mike Garvey (R)	Peak Fitness Racing	Ford	Jani-King
75	Wayne Anderson	Rinaldi Racing	Dodge	R&D Theil
77	Travis Kvapil	Penske Racing	Dodge	Jasper Engines & Transmissions
88	Dale Jarrett	Robert Yates Racing	Ford	UPS
92	Kenny Wallace	Front Row Motorsports	Chevrolet	State Fair Corn Dogs
97	Kurt Busch	Roush Racing	Ford	Sharpie
99	Carl Edwards	Roush Racing	Ford	Office Depot
Official entry list

== Practice ==
=== First practice ===
The first practice session was held on Friday, July 8, at 11:20 AM CST. The session would last for two hours. Greg Biffle, driving for Roush Racing, would set the fastest time in the session, with a lap of 28.821 and an average speed of 187.363 miles per hour (301.532 km/h).

During the session, Joe Gibbs Racing driver Tony Stewart would cut a tire heading into turn 4, sending his car into a hard hit into the wall. As a result, from the crash, Stewart would suffer pain in his upper torso. The team's crew chief, Greg Zipadelli, decided to replace Stewart with driver J. J. Yeley for Saturday's pre-race activities, including qualifying. However, precautionary CT scans tested negative for broken ribs, and Stewart was eventually able to race on Sunday.

Pos.	#	Driver	Team	Make	Time	Speed
1	16	Greg Biffle	Roush Racing	Ford	28.821	187.363
2	48	Jimmie Johnson	Hendrick Motorsports	Chevrolet	28.901	186.845
3	9	Kasey Kahne	Evernham Motorsports	Dodge	28.920	186.722
Full first practice results

=== Second practice ===
The second practice session was held on Saturday, July 9, at 9:30 AM CST. The session would last for 45 minutes. Matt Kenseth, driving for Roush Racing, would set the fastest time in the session, with a lap of 29.412 and an average speed of 183.599 miles per hour (295.474 km/h).

Pos.	#	Driver	Team	Make	Time	Speed
1	17	Matt Kenseth	Roush Racing	Ford	29.412	183.599
2	12	Ryan Newman	Penske-Jasper Racing	Dodge	29.480	183.175
3	16	Greg Biffle	Roush Racing	Ford	29.496	183.076
Full second practice results

=== Third and final practice ===
The final practice session, sometimes referred to as Happy Hour, was held on Saturday, July 9, at 11:10 AM CST. The session would last for 45 minutes. Kyle Busch, driving for Hendrick Motorsports, would set the fastest time in the session, with a lap of 29.610 and an average speed of 182.371 miles per hour (293.498 km/h).

Pos.	#	Driver	Team	Make	Time	Speed
1	5	Kyle Busch	Hendrick Motorsports	Chevrolet	29.610	182.371
2	6	Mark Martin	Roush Racing	Ford	29.715	181.726
3	12	Ryan Newman	Penske-Jasper Racing	Dodge	29.729	181.641
Full Happy Hour practice results

== Qualifying ==
Qualifying was held on Friday, July 8, at 3:10 PM CST. Each driver would have two laps to set a fastest time; the fastest of the two would count as their official qualifying lap.

Jimmie Johnson, driving for Hendrick Motorsports, would win the pole, with a lap of 28.701 and an average speed of 188.147 miles per hour (302.793 km/h).

Four drivers would fail to qualify: Kenny Wallace, Mike Garvey, P. J. Jones, and Wayne Anderson.

=== Full qualifying results ===
Pos.	#	Driver	Team	Make	Time	Speed
1	48	Jimmie Johnson	Hendrick Motorsports	Chevrolet	28.701	188.147
2	12	Ryan Newman	Penske-Jasper Racing	Dodge	28.715	188.055
3	41	Casey Mears	Chip Ganassi Racing	Dodge	28.773	187.676
4	17	Matt Kenseth	Roush Racing	Ford	28.816	187.396
5	25	Brian Vickers	Hendrick Motorsports	Chevrolet	28.827	187.324
6	16	Greg Biffle	Roush Racing	Ford	28.867	187.065
7	10	Scott Riggs	MBV Motorsports	Chevrolet	28.899	186.858
8	88	Dale Jarrett	Robert Yates Racing	Ford	28.929	186.664
9	29	Kevin Harvick	Richard Childress Racing	Chevrolet	28.971	186.393
10	07	Dave Blaney	Richard Childress Racing	Chevrolet	28.989	186.278
11	0	Mike Bliss	Haas CNC Racing	Chevrolet	29.002	186.194
12	7	Robby Gordon	Robby Gordon Motorsports	Chevrolet	29.004	186.181
13	20	J. J. Yeley	Joe Gibbs Racing	Chevrolet	29.006	186.168
14	24	Jeff Gordon	Hendrick Motorsports	Chevrolet	29.008	186.156
15	01	Joe Nemechek	MB2 Motorsports	Chevrolet	29.022	186.066
16	77	Travis Kvapil (R)	Penske-Jasper Racing	Dodge	29.047	185.906
17	32	Bobby Hamilton Jr.	PPI Motorsports	Chevrolet	29.060	185.822
18	9	Kasey Kahne	Evernham Motorsports	Dodge	29.069	185.765
19	97	Kurt Busch	Roush Racing	Ford	29.076	185.720
20	6	Mark Martin	Roush Racing	Ford	29.102	185.554
21	99	Carl Edwards	Roush Racing	Ford	29.115	185.471
22	19	Jeremy Mayfield	Evernham Motorsports	Dodge	29.129	185.382
23	38	Elliott Sadler	Robert Yates Racing	Ford	29.134	185.350
24	5	Kyle Busch (R)	Hendrick Motorsports	Chevrolet	29.151	185.242
25	8	Dale Earnhardt Jr.	Dale Earnhardt, Inc.	Chevrolet	29.224	184.780
26	18	Bobby Labonte	Joe Gibbs Racing	Chevrolet	29.245	184.647
27	15	Michael Waltrip	Dale Earnhardt, Inc.	Chevrolet	29.253	184.596
28	21	Ricky Rudd	Wood Brothers Racing	Ford	29.267	184.508
29	45	Kyle Petty	Petty Enterprises	Dodge	29.273	184.470
30	22	Scott Wimmer	Bill Davis Racing	Dodge	29.289	184.370
31	39	David Stremme	Chip Ganassi Racing	Dodge	29.332	184.099
32	51	Stuart Kirby	Competitive Edge Motorsports	Chevrolet	29.343	184.030
33	2	Rusty Wallace	Penske-Jasper Racing	Dodge	29.356	183.949
34	44	Terry Labonte	Hendrick Motorsports	Chevrolet	29.378	183.811
35	31	Jeff Burton	Richard Childress Racing	Chevrolet	29.422	183.536
36	42	Jamie McMurray	Chip Ganassi Racing	Dodge	29.439	183.430
37	00	Carl Long	McGlynn Racing	Dodge	29.480	183.175
38	40	Sterling Marlin	Chip Ganassi Racing	Dodge	29.498	183.063
39	37	Kevin Lepage	R&J Racing	Dodge	29.546	182.766
40	43	Jeff Green	Petty Enterprises	Dodge	29.565	182.648
41	49	Ken Schrader	BAM Racing	Dodge	29.634	182.223
Qualified by owner's points
42	4	Mike Wallace	Morgan–McClure Motorsports	Chevrolet	30.219	178.695
Last car to qualify on time
43	11	Jason Leffler	Joe Gibbs Racing	Chevrolet	29.700	181.818
Failed to qualify
44	92	Kenny Wallace	Front Row Motorsports	Chevrolet	29.703	181.800
45	66	Mike Garvey (R)	Peak Fitness Racing	Ford	29.920	180.481
46	34	P. J. Jones	Mach 1 Motorsports	Chevrolet	30.504	177.026
47	75	Wayne Anderson	Rinaldi Racing	Dodge	30.664	176.102
Official qualifying results

== Race results ==
Fin	St	#	Driver	Team	Make	Laps	Led	Status	Pts	Winnings
1	25	8	Dale Earnhardt Jr.	Dale Earnhardt, Inc.	Chevrolet	267	11	running	185	$325,033
2	4	17	Matt Kenseth	Roush Racing	Ford	267	176	running	180	$265,201
3	1	48	Jimmie Johnson	Hendrick Motorsports	Chevrolet	267	21	running	170	$217,266
4	5	25	Brian Vickers	Hendrick Motorsports	Chevrolet	267	0	running	160	$146,300
5	13	20	Tony Stewart	Joe Gibbs Racing	Chevrolet	267	0	running	155	$169,561
6	22	19	Jeremy Mayfield	Evernham Motorsports	Dodge	267	0	running	150	$135,220
7	28	21	Ricky Rudd	Wood Brothers Racing	Ford	267	0	running	146	$130,564
8	19	97	Kurt Busch	Roush Racing	Ford	267	0	running	142	$148,775
9	3	41	Casey Mears	Chip Ganassi Racing	Dodge	267	0	running	138	$125,608
10	20	6	Mark Martin	Roush Racing	Ford	267	0	running	134	$112,375
11	6	16	Greg Biffle	Roush Racing	Ford	267	34	running	135	$107,625
12	33	2	Rusty Wallace	Penske-Jasper Racing	Dodge	267	0	running	127	$123,458
13	26	18	Bobby Labonte	Joe Gibbs Racing	Chevrolet	267	0	running	124	$126,350
14	24	5	Kyle Busch (R)	Hendrick Motorsports	Chevrolet	267	0	running	121	$99,600
15	15	01	Joe Nemechek	MB2 Motorsports	Chevrolet	267	0	running	118	$115,058
16	31	39	David Stremme	Chip Ganassi Racing	Dodge	267	0	running	115	$84,800
17	30	22	Scott Wimmer	Bill Davis Racing	Dodge	267	10	running	117	$110,158
18	8	88	Dale Jarrett	Robert Yates Racing	Ford	267	0	running	109	$121,458
19	9	29	Kevin Harvick	Richard Childress Racing	Chevrolet	267	0	running	106	$129,936
20	43	11	Jason Leffler	Joe Gibbs Racing	Chevrolet	267	0	running	103	$93,050
21	17	32	Bobby Hamilton Jr.	PPI Motorsports	Chevrolet	267	1	running	105	$96,958
22	36	42	Jamie McMurray	Chip Ganassi Racing	Dodge	267	0	running	97	$92,600
23	7	10	Scott Riggs	MBV Motorsports	Chevrolet	267	0	running	94	$102,397
24	40	43	Jeff Green	Petty Enterprises	Dodge	267	0	running	91	$112,136
25	42	4	Mike Wallace	Morgan–McClure Motorsports	Chevrolet	267	1	running	93	$82,890
26	41	49	Ken Schrader	BAM Racing	Dodge	267	1	running	90	$81,775
27	29	45	Kyle Petty	Petty Enterprises	Dodge	267	1	running	87	$81,175
28	39	37	Kevin Lepage	R&J Racing	Dodge	267	1	running	84	$80,075
29	2	12	Ryan Newman	Penske-Jasper Racing	Dodge	262	9	running	81	$122,366
30	35	31	Jeff Burton	Richard Childress Racing	Chevrolet	260	0	running	73	$103,970
31	32	51	Stuart Kirby	Competitive Edge Motorsports	Chevrolet	259	0	running	70	$76,925
32	38	40	Sterling Marlin	Chip Ganassi Racing	Dodge	253	1	engine	72	$104,633
33	14	24	Jeff Gordon	Hendrick Motorsports	Chevrolet	249	0	crash	64	$126,211
34	11	0	Mike Bliss	Haas CNC Racing	Chevrolet	249	0	crash	61	$76,325
35	12	7	Robby Gordon	Robby Gordon Motorsports	Chevrolet	222	0	running	58	$76,125
36	27	15	Michael Waltrip	Dale Earnhardt, Inc.	Chevrolet	214	0	crash	55	$103,139
37	23	38	Elliott Sadler	Robert Yates Racing	Ford	210	0	running	52	$115,691
38	10	07	Dave Blaney	Richard Childress Racing	Chevrolet	200	0	handling	49	$83,500
39	21	99	Carl Edwards	Roush Racing	Ford	170	0	running	46	$93,290
40	37	00	Carl Long	McGlynn Racing	Dodge	148	0	handling	43	$75,080
41	18	9	Kasey Kahne	Evernham Motorsports	Dodge	138	0	engine	40	$106,955
42	34	44	Terry Labonte	Hendrick Motorsports	Chevrolet	124	0	handling	37	$74,695
43	16	77	Travis Kvapil (R)	Penske-Jasper Racing	Dodge	13	0	engine	34	$82,486
Failed to qualify
44		92	Kenny Wallace	Front Row Motorsports	Chevrolet					
45		66	Mike Garvey (R)	Peak Fitness Racing	Ford					
46		34	P. J. Jones	Mach 1 Motorsports	Chevrolet					
47		75	Wayne Anderson	Rinaldi Racing	Dodge					
Official race results

== Standings after the race ==
Drivers' Championship standings

	Pos	Driver	Points
	1	Jimmie Johnson	2,548
	2	Greg Biffle	2,440 (-108)
	3	Tony Stewart	2,397 (-151)
1	4	Rusty Wallace	2,300 (–248)
1	5	Elliott Sadler	2,230 (–318)
2	6	Mark Martin	2,202 (–346)
1	7	Ryan Newman	2,196 (–352)
1	8	Jamie McMurray	2,190 (–358)
2	9	Jeremy Mayfield	2,179 (–369)
1	10	Kurt Busch	2,172 (–376)
Official driver's standings

- Note: Only the first 10 positions are included for the driver standings.

Previous race: 2005 Pepsi 400	NASCAR Nextel Cup Series; 2005 season	Next race: 2005 New England 300
