= Jennifer Li =

Chinese business executive (born 1967)

- Born: September 21, 1967 (age 58); Beijing, China
- Occupations: CEO, Baidu Capital

Jennifer Li is a Chinese business executive who has served as the chief financial officer of Baidu since March 2008. As of 2014, she is listed as the 95th most powerful woman in the world by Forbes.

== Early life and education ==
Li was raised in Beijing, China. As a child, she dreamed of becoming an astronaut because it represented an "intellectual and physical challenge."

She earned a Bachelor's degree at Tsinghua University and a Master of Business Administration degree at the University of British Columbia.

== Career ==
Beginning in 1994, Li held various positions in finance at General Motors, working in China, Canada, the United States, and Singapore. From 2005 to 2008, she served as the Controller of GMAC's North American Operations (now Ally Financial).

In March 2008, she was hired as the chief financial officer of Baidu.

In addition to her role as the chief financial officer of Baidu, Li also worked in the marketing and human resources departments and was involved in the company's mergers-and-acquisitions strategy.

In April 2017, Li was named CEO of Baidu Capital.

== Honors ==
- In 2016, Li was listed by Fortune Magazine as 34th on the "Most Powerful Women" International list.
- In 2012, Li was recognized by Fortune Magazine as one of "Asia's 25 Hottest People in Business".
- In 2013 and 2014, Li was listed as one of the "World's 100 Most Powerful Women" by Forbes.
  - In 2013, she was listed as the 98th most powerful woman on the list.
  - In 2014, she was listed as the 95th.

== Personal life ==
Li is married and has 2 children. She has discussed the challenges of juggling the responsibilities of parenthood and professional life, explaining that she "[leaves] the house at eight am every morning and am still at the office at nine pm, so I seldom get to see [my children] on workdays. But I try and keep the weekdays and weekends separate and aim to devote Saturdays and Sundays to them."

She currently resides in Beijing.
