= ResCap =

RESCAP or ResCap may refer to:

- RESCAP, a military acronym for "Rescue Combat Air Patrol"
- GMAC ResCap, a defunct residential mortgage loan originator and servicer based in the American city of Minneapolis
