= Matt Martin (racing driver) =

American racing driver

- Born: December 17, 1991 (age 34)
- Relatives: Mark Martin (father)

Previous series
- 2006 2006 2005 2004: FASCAR Pro Truck and Sportsman Series; ASA Late Model Series; FASCAR; FASTRUCK

Matt Martin (born December 17, 1991) is a retired American stock car racing driver. He's a 2018 graduate of Lyon College in Batesville, Ar. He is the son of former NASCAR Sprint Cup Series driver Mark Martin.

== Career ==
Martin's career began in quarter midgets when he just was seven years old. His racing experience also includes Bandoleros, Legend cars, the FASTRUCK Series, and the FASCAR Pro Truck Series. He received the nickname "Little Intimidator" due to his driving style.

In 2003, Martin was signed to a driver development contract with the Ford Motor Company, making him the youngest member of the Ford racing family. By 2004 at age 13, Martin had five wins in the FastKids division of the FASTRUCK Series, a series for youths aged 12 to 17.

In 2005, he won two races while competing against drivers ten to twenty years his senior in the FASCAR league. He raced the No. 66 Ford F-150 Truck. In the game video NASCAR 06: Total Team Control which takes place in 2005, Martin can be noticed as a fantasy driver for the Whelen Modified Tour. In 2006, at 14 years of age, he ran a limited schedule in the southern tour of the ASA Late Model Series, as well as running in the FASCAR Pro Truck and Sportsman Series. He won a late model race at New Smyrna Speedway in Florida and finished third in the season points.

During the 2007 season, Matt was moved over from the Ford Motor Company development program to Ginn Racing's development program; headed up by Mark Martin. Matt planned on running a late model schedule very similar to teammate Ricky Carmichael. Mark and Matt planned on working together throughout Mark's limited NEXTEL Cup schedule. During a March 8, 2008 airing of Speed Channel's Trackside, Mark announced that Matt ended his racing career. Mark stated his son wanted to concentrate on his education but didn't rule out a possible return to racing; later that year Matt Martin stated that racing was "not my thing [anymore]".

As of September 2010, Martin has moved to North Carolina to take an internship with Hendrick Motorsports, working with the organization's strength and conditioning coach.
