= Ron Michaelson =

American actor

Ron Michaelson is an American actor.

== Career ==
He is known for appearing in commercials for Ditech.com, where he plays a character known as "Ned the Banker." The commercials intend to show that Ned is unable to close a mortgage deal, even with his own mother, because of Ditech's highly competitive rates and services. Most commercials end with the punch line, "I just lost another loan to Ditech!" Michaelson's character in the commercials has become highly recognizable to US audiences, to the extent that Michaelson was interviewed by Daryn Kagan on CNN.

Michaelson is also a professor teaching acting at Golden West College, a community college in Huntington Beach, California, and at Fullerton College, a community college in Fullerton, California.

He has also made guest appearances in the FOX series Arrested Development, the CBS series Joan of Arcadia and HBO's Carnivàle and Entourage. Other series work include ‘s the WB's Jack & Jill, Nickelodeon All That and NBC's Golden Girls. On February 27, 2006, Michaelson also had a "walk-on clue" role on the trivia game show Jeopardy!. Other projects include the independent film Boxboarders and the made-for-television movies Mystery Woman and You've Got A Friend for the Hallmark Channel. Most recently he appeared on HBO's Veep and Tim & Eric's Bedtime Stories on Adult Swim.

In 2013, Michaelson did a commercial for Cash Call called "Banker's Mom" where he essentially reprises his role from the Ditech commercials.
