= Florida All Stars Tour =

American late model racing series

Florida AllStars Tour
- Sport: Stock car racing
- Founded: 2010
- First season: 2010
- Folded: 2010
- Country: United States
- Last champion: Wayne Anderson

The Florida All Stars Tour was an American late model racing series that competed a nine-race schedule during 2010 at tracks in the state of Florida. Created by Dick and Wayne Anderson, the series was intended to be a joint venture between drivers and track owners.

The series was intended to revive late model racing in Florida, which had been struggling under economic pressure. It unified three separate classes of Late Model stock cars, using weight and engine restrictions to balance competition. Races consisted of 100 laps per event, and were required to finish under a green flag condition.

Winning four of the series' nine events, Wayne Anderson won the series' inaugural championship over Austin Kirkpatrick. Despite the success of the series and popularity among drivers, none of the tracks the series raced on chose to renew their sanctioning agreements with the series, and it closed after the season.
