= Nuvell Financial Services =

- Industry: Car finance
- Founded: 1997; 29 years ago
- Defunct: 2009; 17 years ago
- Fate: Dissolved
- Headquarters: Little Rock, Arkansas
- Parent: GMAC (now Ally Financial)

Nuvell Financial Services was a subsidiary of GMAC (now Ally Financial) that originated subprime auto loans. In March 2009, the company was shut down by its parent.

Nuvell was based in Little Rock, Arkansas, with other offices in Bedford, Texas, Jacksonville, Florida, Greeley, Colorado, and Anaheim, California.

Nuvell also serviced loans for American Suzuki Financial Services and Saab Group (SFSC).

== History ==
The company was founded in 1997 when GMAC acquired the assets of LSI Holdings Inc.

In June 1998, Tommy Pritchard was appointed president of the company.

In February 2000, the company began buying contracts originated by dealers affiliated with National Auto Finance Co., as long as they met Nuvell's standards.

In March 2009, the company was shut down by its parent.
