= John McNamara (fraudster) =

Real Estate Developer

John M. McNamara (born 1940) is an American former businessman who was convicted of a Ponzi scheme fraud through gaining loans to a value of $6 billion from General Motors financing arm GMAC, to develop a $400M car sales and property development business.

== Background ==
The son of an Irish immigrant, raised in Port Jefferson, Long Island in the state of New York, McNamara was a devout Roman Catholic who was college educated. Twice-divorced, he had been declared bankrupt from a failed business venture in Florida.

Returning to the single family-owned Pontiac-Buick auto dealership in Port Jefferson which his father started, as President of Sales, McNamara had ambitions in property development and politics. He made large contributions to his church, and single-handedly bankrolled a haven for wayward teenagers. Refused credit by some others, he hired bodyguards to intimidate those probing his business dealings.

== Business scheme ==
With access to financing via GMAC, from 1980 McNamara applied for a series of loans to buy non-GM vans, valued at US$25,000 each, which he said would be customized, before being pre-sold and shipped to the Mediterranean island country of Cyprus.

McNamara established a company called Kay Industries Inc in Indiana which was supposedly responsible for customization of automobiles. Kay Industries gave McNamara Pontiac-Buick invoices stamped "paid," which they then submitted to GMAC. GMAC in return gave McNamara Pontiac-Buick a 30-day loan on each customized vehicle, to allow for its export and sale. McNamara Pontiac-Buick would then supposedly sell the vans to another McNamara-owned corporation, which in turn claimed to be shipping them to Cydonia Trading CTD, a McNamara-owned buyer in Cyprus. After shipping the vans overseas, McNamara Pontiac-Buick would then repay the loans within 30 days, while at the same time borrowing additional funds from GMAC for the next shipment of vehicles.

== Ponzi scheme ==
No vans in McNamara's scheme were ever purchased, customized or sold. McNamara used the $400 million of money skimmed from the loans to finance the purchase and operations of 70 different corporations and partnerships, including:

- two additional auto dealerships
- a car loan company
- Real estate companies that owned more than 100 properties in New York, Maryland, Georgia, Florida and the Middle East, including a Days Inn motel
- a mortgage financing company
- two gold mines in Nevada
- an oil business
- two seats on the New York Mercantile Exchange
- a newspaper company
- a pharmaceutical company
- considerable amounts of stocks, bonds and notes
- a $500,000 personal home
- a $350,000 home for his ex-wife
- a $500,000 trust fund for his daughter
- a private jet and a limousine

Part of the money McNamara skimmed was used to bribe local and state level officials in Brookhaven over his property development business, by offering higher trade-ins, lower purchase prices or lease payments on cars, and in limited cases direct cash.

In the 11 years the operation ran, as is typical of a Ponzi scheme, McNamara had to take out larger and larger loans each year to pay off the payments due on previous loans. In 1985 he took out loans totaling $250 million, $715 million in 1989, $1.88 billion in 1990 and $1.93 billion in 1991. Loans over the 11-year period totaled $6 billion for 17,000 vans. Since all loan payments were made on time, GMAC viewed McNamara as a valued and even profitable customer, extending him special terms, such as increasing the time required for his first payment from the standard 30 days to 60 days. Over the last four years of the scheme, the total amount of the loans made to McNamara exceeded the gross domestic product of the country of Panama.

== Collapse and analysis ==
In 1991, GM internal auditors discovered the size and scale of McNamara's loans, but did not see the corresponding vans being purchased from GM. They refused further loans, which directly led to the collapse of McNamara's entire business. With the fraud eventually discovered, after loans totalling over US$6 billion repaid, it resulted in approximately $436 million in unpaid inventory financing. When McNamara was first confronted by federal officials he reportedly said, "What took you so long to catch me?"

GMAC conducted an in-depth analysis of the events that had enabled the fraud to take place, resulting in a significant re-structuring of the commercial credit operations of GMAC. A report concluded that the fraud was made possible by organizational and relationship symptoms, as well as anomalies in the lending practices of GMAC, including:

- Deviation from GMAC's standard operating procedures, granting privileges to McNamara that were unavailable to others. The extent of lending exceeded credit limits for any other customer
- GMAC never physically inspected any of the vehicles, none of which were GM products. The number of vans bought represented more converted vans than the entire US industry produced, requiring Kay Industries to have a factory capable of producing 200–400 vans per day
- The sales to Cydonia Trading violated GM's franchise agreements, because domestic dealers are not supposed to sell cars to overseas buyers
- The local GMAC office occasionally closed its doors to other customers so it could process McNamara's pile of paperwork, referred to as "Mac Attacks."
- GMAC's computer software was modified to handle the unique demands of McNamara's volume business

Once GMAC terminated McNamara's line of credit, they disciplined a handful of managers, but also said their internal investigation "did not reveal systemic problems with GMAC's operating and control procedures in its core business functions."

== Trial and conviction ==
Brought to trial in 1992 at the United States district court in Brooklyn over various charges of fraud, McNamara faced a maximum sentence of 20 years in jail and $800 million in fines. A plea bargaining deal with state and federal prosecutors reduced this considerably to five years, on the condition that he provide evidence against the officials he had bribed with regards to his property development projects. In concluding the case, the judge agreed that McNamara's sentence could be reviewed further, should the value of his evidence prove great and should he choose to enter the United States Federal Witness Protection Program. In 1995, three of those officials were acquitted of bribery.

== Post-conviction life ==
In exchange for the evidence he provided, McNamara was allowed to remain free, keeping around $2 million in assets. He transferred all of his homes to his then-girlfriend Diane Dangerfield, and continued to live in his Long Island mansion. He later opened an auto parts supply company. Lead prosecutor assistant U.S. Attorney Loretta Lynch revealed that McNamara's personal life was similar pre- and post-conviction.
