= Wayne Anderson (racing driver, born 1968) =

American late model race car driver

- Born: July 16, 1968 (age 58); Wildwood, Florida, U.S.
- Achievements: 1993 Triple Crown champion 1999, 2001 Slim Jim All Pro Series Champion; 2010 Florida All Stars Tour Champion
- Awards: 2001 Slim Jim All Pro Series Most Popular Driver

NASCAR Cup Series career
- 1 race run over 1 year
- Best finish: 87th (2005)
- First race: 2005 Sylvania 300 (New Hampshire)
Wins	Top tens	Poles
0	0	0

NASCAR FedEx Freight Truck Series career
- 23 races run over 2 years
- Best finish: 25th (1998)
- First race: 1997 Federated Auto Parts 250 (Nashville)
- Last race: 1998 Memphis 200 (Memphis)
Wins	Top tens	Poles
0	2	0
- Statistics up to date as of March 14, 2013.

Wayne Anderson (born July 16, 1968) is an American late model race car driver. Born in Wildwood, Florida, Anderson graduated from high school in 1986. He has two championships in the NASCAR Pro-Series, which were in 1999 and 2001. Anderson also participated in the Camping World Truck Series and Nextel Cup Series, which in the Truck Series he was able to get two top-ten finishes. He also won a championship in the FASCAR. Along with his father and Alan Bruns, he created the Florida All Stars Tour. In 2001, he was able to win the Snowball Derby.

== Early and personal life ==
Anderson, born on July 16, 1968, in Wildwood, Florida, graduated high school in 1986.

== Career ==
=== Beginnings ===
In 1987 Anderson received the Rookie of the Year award at Bronson Speedway, as well as Lakeland Speedway. Six years later, he became a FASCAR champion, by winning at Orlando Speedworld and New Smyrna Speedway. In 1994 he finished second in point standings in United Stock Car Alliance. One year later, he finished fifth in his first NASCAR Slim Jim All-Pro Series at Nashville Fairgrounds Speedway. In 1996, he competed in all the events in the series, and won a total of one race, five pole positions, and placed second in the Rookie of the Year standings.

=== 1997–2004 ===
One year later, in 1997, he competed in two Truck Series events, the All-Pro Series, as well as in the NASCAR Busch North Series (now NASCAR K&N Pro Series East) and NASCAR Southwest Touring Series. In 1998, Anderson began to race in most of the races in the Craftsman Truck Series, while racing in the All-Pro Series. In the All-Pro Series, he won the first race of the season. On the other hand, his achievements in the Truck Series were only two top-tens. During 1999, Anderson became the Slim Jim All-Pro Series champion, as well as winning the All American 400 at Nashville Superspeedway, the Governor's Cup, and he held the most wins in the series. One year later, he became Speedweeks Super Late Model champion, and had the most wins in the All-Pro Series.

In 2001, he became the All-Pro Series champion for the second time, and voted the series Most Popular driver. He was also the 2001 Snowball Derby winner. During 2002, he became the Texas Big Shot winner, as well as the Southern All Stars winner. He also participated in the American Speed Association (ASA). In 2003, he was the Speedweeks Super Late Model champion for the second time, as well as the Pete Orr Memorial winner. He also participated in the ARCA Remax Series, where he recorded one top-five and two top-ten finishes after participating in fours races. He also became the Triple Crown Champion, the Governor's Cup winner, and the Florida Sunbelt Series champion. One year later, he won the Florida Sunbelt Series championship for the second time.

=== 2005–2010 ===
In 2005, Anderson participated in one Nextel Cup Series event. Two years later, in 2007, he returned to the ARCA Racing Series by participating in one race. In 2010, he, along with his father and Alan Bruns created the Florida All Stars Tour.

== Motorsports career results ==
=== NASCAR ===
(key) (Bold – Pole position awarded by qualifying time. Italics – Pole position earned by points standings or practice time. * – Most laps led.)

==== Nextel Cup Series ====
NASCAR Nextel Cup Series results
Year	Team	No.	Make	1	2	3	4	5	6	7	8	9	10	11	12	13	14	15	16	17	18	19	20	21	22	23	24	25	26	27	28	29	30	31	32	33	34	35	36	NNCC	Pts	Ref
2005	Rinaldi Racing	75	Dodge	DAY	CAL	LVS	ATL	BRI	MAR	TEX	PHO	TAL	DAR	RCH	CLT	DOV	POC	MCH	SON	DAY	CHI; DNQ	NHA; DNQ	POC	IND	GLN	MCH	BRI; DNQ	CAL	RCH; DNQ	NHA; 43	DOV; DNQ	TAL								87th	34	
2005	Buddy Sisco Racing	61	Dodge																														KAN; DNQ	CLT	MAR; DNQ	ATL	TEX	PHO	HOM	87th	34	

==== Busch Series ====
NASCAR Busch Series results
Year	Team	No.	Make	1	2	3	4	5	6	7	8	9	10	11	12	13	14	15	16	17	18	19	20	21	22	23	24	25	26	27	28	29	30	31	32	33	34	NBSC	Pts	Ref
1996		85	Chevy	DAY	CAR	RCH	ATL	NSV; DNQ	DAR	BRI	HCY	NZH	CLT	DOV	SBO	MYB	GLN	MLW	NHA	TAL	IRP	MCH	BRI	DAR	RCH	DOV	CLT	CAR	HOM									NA	-	
2003	TC Motorsports	35	Chevy	DAY	CAR	LVS	DAR	BRI	TEX	TAL	NSH	CAL	RCH	GTY	NZH	CLT	DOV	NSH	KEN	MLW	DAY	CHI	NHA	PPR	IRP	MCH	BRI	DAR	RCH	DOV	KAN	CLT; DNQ	MEM	ATL; DNQ	PHO	CAR	HOM	NA	-	

==== Craftsman Truck Series ====
NASCAR Craftsman Truck Series results
Year	Team	No.	Make	1	2	3	4	5	6	7	8	9	10	11	12	13	14	15	16	17	18	19	20	21	22	23	24	25	26	27	NCTC	Pts	Ref
1997	Liberty Racing	97	Ford	WDW	TUS	HOM	PHO	POR	EVG	I70	NHA	TEX	BRI	NZH	MLW	LVL	CNS	HPT	IRP	FLM	NSV; 31	GLN	RCH	MAR	SON	MMR	CAL	PHO	LVS; 29		95th	146	
1998	Liberty Racing	84	Ford	WDW; 15	HOM; 19	PHO; 20	POR; 25	EVG; 15	I70; 9	GLN; 26	TEX; 21	BRI; 34	MLW; 25	NZH; 26	CAL; 34	PPR; 25	IRP; 18	NHA; 23	FLM; 30	NSV; 18	HPT; 12	LVL; 26	RCH; 21	MEM; 10	GTY	MAR	SON	MMR	PHO	LVS	25th	2070	

==== Busch North Series ====
NASCAR Busch North Series results
Year	Team	No.	Make	1	2	3	4	5	6	7	8	9	10	11	12	13	14	15	16	17	18	19	20	21	22	NBNSC	Pts	Ref
1997	Tony Vecchio	1	Chevy	DAY	LEE	JEN	NHA; 16	NZH	HOL	NHA; 17	STA	BEE	TMP	NZH	TIO	NHA	STA	THU	GLN	EPP	RPS	BEE	TMP	NHA; 12	LRP	48th	354	

=== ARCA Re/Max Series ===
(key) (Bold – Pole position awarded by qualifying time. Italics – Pole position earned by points standings or practice time. * – Most laps led.)

ARCA Re/Max Series results
Year	Team	No.	Make	1	2	3	4	5	6	7	8	9	10	11	12	13	14	15	16	17	18	19	20	21	22	23	ARMC	Pts	Ref
2003	TC Motorsports	35	Chevy	DAY	ATL	NSH; DNQ	SLM	TOL	KEN	CLT; DNQ	BLN	KAN; 8	MCH; 39	LER	POC	POC	NSH; 7	ISF	WIN	DSF	CHI; 5	SLM	TAL	CLT; 18	SBO		33rd	820	
2004	TC Motorsports	35	Pontiac	DAY; 29																							49th	590	
2004	TC Motorsports	35	Chevy		NSH; 6	SLM	KEN; 26	TOL	CLT; 5	KAN	POC	MCH	SBO	BLN	KEN	GTW	POC	LER	NSH	ISF	TOL	DSF	CHI	SLM	TAL		49th	590	
2007	Wayne Anderson	8	Dodge	DAY	USA; 3	NSH	SLM	KAN	WIN	KEN	TOL	IOW	POC	MCH	BLN	KEN	POC	NSH	ISF	MIL	GTW	DSF	CHI	SLM	TAL	TOL	102nd	215	

Achievements
Preceded by Gary St. Amant	Snowball Derby Winner; 2001	Succeeded by Ricky Turner
