= 2005 UAW-Ford 500 =

Race details
- Race 29 of 36 in the 2005 NASCAR Nextel Cup Series
- 2005 UAW-Ford 500 program cover
- Date: October 2, 2005
- Official name: UAW Ford 500
- Location: Talladega, Alabama, U.S.
- Course: Talladega Superspeedway
- Course length: 2.66 miles (4.281 km)
- Distance: 190 laps, 505.4 mi (813.362 km)
- Scheduled distance: 188 laps, 500.08 mi (804.801 km)
- Average speed: 143.818 miles per hour (231.453 km/h)
- Attendance: 155,000

Pole position
Driver	Elliott Sadler	Robert Yates Racing
- Time: 50.597; 189.260 miles per hour (304.584 km/h)

Most laps led
Driver	Tony Stewart	Joe Gibbs Racing
- Laps: 65

Winner
No. 88	Dale Jarrett	Robert Yates Racing

Television in the United States
- Network: NBC
- Announcers: Bill Weber, Benny Parsons, Wally Dallenbach Jr.

The 2005 UAW-Ford 500 was a NASCAR Nextel Cup Series race that took place on October 2, 2005, at Talladega Superspeedway in Lincoln, Alabama. It was the 29th race of the 2005 NASCAR Nextel Cup Series and the third in the ten-race, season-ending Chase for the Nextel Cup. Dale Jarrett of Robert Yates Racing won the race, taking his 32nd, and final, Cup Series victory.

== Entry list ==
Car	Driver	Make	Team
0	Mike Bliss	Chevrolet	Haas CNC Racing
01	Joe Nemechek	Chevrolet	MB2 Motorsports
1	Martin Truex Jr.	Chevrolet	Dale Earnhardt Inc.
2	Rusty Wallace (CC)	Dodge	Penske-Jasper Racing
4	Mike Wallace	Chevrolet	Morgan-McClure Motorsports
5	Kyle Busch (R)	Chevrolet	Hendrick Motorsports
6	Mark Martin (CC)	Ford	Roush Racing
07	Dave Blaney	Chevrolet	Richard Childress Racing
7	Robby Gordon	Chevrolet	Robby Gordon Motorsports
8	Dale Earnhardt Jr.	Chevrolet	Dale Earnhardt Inc.
09	Johnny Sauter	Dodge	Phoenix Racing
9	Kasey Kahne	Dodge	Evernham Motorsports
10	Scott Riggs	Chevrolet	MBV Motorsports
11	J. J. Yeley	Chevrolet	Joe Gibbs Racing
12	Ryan Newman (CC)	Dodge	Penske-Jasper Racing
15	Michael Waltrip	Chevrolet	Dale Earnhardt Inc.
16	Greg Biffle (CC)	Ford	Roush Racing
17	Matt Kenseth (CC)	Ford	Roush Racing
18	Bobby Labonte	Chevrolet	Joe Gibbs Racing
19	Jeremy Mayfield (CC)	Dodge	Evernham Motorsports
20	Tony Stewart (CC)	Chevrolet	Joe Gibbs Racing
21	Ricky Rudd	Ford	Wood Brothers Racing
22	Scott Wimmer	Dodge	Bill Davis Racing
24	Jeff Gordon	Chevrolet	Hendrick Motorsports
25	Brian Vickers	Chevrolet	Hendrick Motorsports
29	Kevin Harvick	Chevrolet	Richard Childress Racing
31	Jeff Burton	Chevrolet	Richard Childress Racing
32	Bobby Hamilton Jr.	Chevrolet	PPI Motorsports
33	Kerry Earnhardt	Chevrolet	Richard Childress Racing
34	Hermie Sadler	Ford	Mach 1 Motorsports
37	Tony Raines	Dodge	R&J Racing
38	Elliott Sadler	Ford	Robert Yates Racing
40	Sterling Marlin	Dodge	Chip Ganassi Racing
41	Casey Mears	Dodge	Chip Ganassi Racing
42	Jamie McMurray	Dodge	Chip Ganassi Racing
43	Jeff Green	Dodge	Petty Enterprises
45	Kyle Petty	Dodge	Petty Enterprises
48	Jimmie Johnson (CC)	Chevrolet	Hendrick Motorsports
49	Ken Schrader	Dodge	BAM Racing
66	Kevin Lepage	Ford	Peak Fitness Racing
77	Travis Kvapil (R)	Dodge	Douglas Bawel
88	Dale Jarrett	Ford	Robert Yates Racing
89	Morgan Shepherd	Dodge	Shepherd Racing Ventures
92	Mike Skinner	Chevrolet	Front Row Motorsports
97	Kurt Busch (CC)	Ford	Roush Racing
99	Carl Edwards (CC)	Ford	Roush Racing

== Qualifying ==
Pos.	Car	Driver	Make	Speed	Time	Behind
1	38	Elliott Sadler	Ford	189.260	50.597	0.000
2	88	Dale Jarrett	Ford	188.775	50.727	-0.130
3	12	Ryan Newman (CC)	Dodge	188.597	50.775	-0.178
4	20	Tony Stewart (CC)	Chevrolet	188.571	50.782	-0.185
5	01	Joe Nemechek	Chevrolet	188.333	50.846	-0.249
6	18	Bobby Labonte	Chevrolet	188.307	50.853	-0.256
7	10	Scott Riggs	Chevrolet	188.270	50.863	-0.266
8	16	Greg Biffle (CC)	Ford	188.237	50.872	-0.275
9	48	Jimmie Johnson (CC)	Chevrolet	188.215	50.878	-0.281
10	99	Carl Edwards (CC)	Ford	188.100	50.909	-0.312
11	17	Matt Kenseth (CC)	Ford	187.997	50.937	-0.340
12	24	Jeff Gordon	Chevrolet	187.805	50.989	-0.392
13	5	Kyle Busch (R)	Chevrolet	187.757	51.002	-0.405
14	42	Jamie McMurray	Dodge	187.687	51.021	-0.424
15	77	Travis Kvapil (R)	Dodge	187.640	51.034	-0.437
16	40	Sterling Marlin	Dodge	187.529	51.064	-0.467
17	1	Martin Truex Jr.	Chevrolet	187.496	51.073	-0.476
18	31	Jeff Burton	Chevrolet	187.478	51.078	-0.481
19	11	J. J. Yeley	Chevrolet	187.405	51.098	-0.501
20	8	Dale Earnhardt Jr.	Chevrolet	187.071	51.189	-0.592
21	97	Kurt Busch (CC)	Ford	187.046	51.196	-0.599
22	7	Robby Gordon	Chevrolet	187.020	51.203	-0.606
23	0	Mike Bliss	Chevrolet	186.936	51.226	-0.629
24	6	Mark Martin (CC)	Ford	186.787	51.267	-0.670
25	15	Michael Waltrip	Chevrolet	186.638	51.308	-0.711
26	41	Casey Mears	Dodge	186.558	51.330	-0.733
27	25	Brian Vickers	Chevrolet	186.543	51.334	-0.737
28	9	Kasey Kahne	Dodge	186.507	51.344	-0.747
29	21	Ricky Rudd	Ford	186.438	51.363	-0.766
30	07	Dave Blaney	Chevrolet	186.325	51.394	-0.797
31	92	Mike Skinner	Chevrolet	186.206	51.427	-0.830
32	19	Jeremy Mayfield (CC)	Dodge	186.141	51.445	-0.848
33	4	Mike Wallace	Chevrolet	186.043	51.472	-0.875
34	33	Kerry Earnhardt	Chevrolet	186.018	51.479	-0.882
35	34	Hermie Sadler	Ford	185.945	51.499	-0.902
36	22	Scott Wimmer	Dodge	185.917	51.507	-0.910
37	66	Kevin Lepage	Ford	185.801	51.539	-0.942
38	45	Kyle Petty	Dodge	185.255	51.691	-1.094
39	49	Ken Schrader	Dodge	184.662	51.857	-1.260
40	43	Jeff Green	Dodge	184.658	51.858	-1.261
41	2	Rusty Wallace (CC)	Dodge	177.458	53.962	-3.365
42	29	Kevin Harvick	Chevrolet	0.000	0.000	0.000
43	37	Tony Raines	Dodge	185.208	51.704	-1.107
Failed to qualify, withdrew, or driver changes
44	32	Bobby Hamilton Jr.	Chevrolet		51.820	
45	09	Johnny Sauter	Dodge		52.222	
46	89	Morgan Shepherd	Dodge		52.331	
DC	34	Hermie Sadler	Ford	0.000	0.000	0.000
WD	92	Mike Skinner	Chevrolet	186.206	51.427	-0.830

== Race results ==
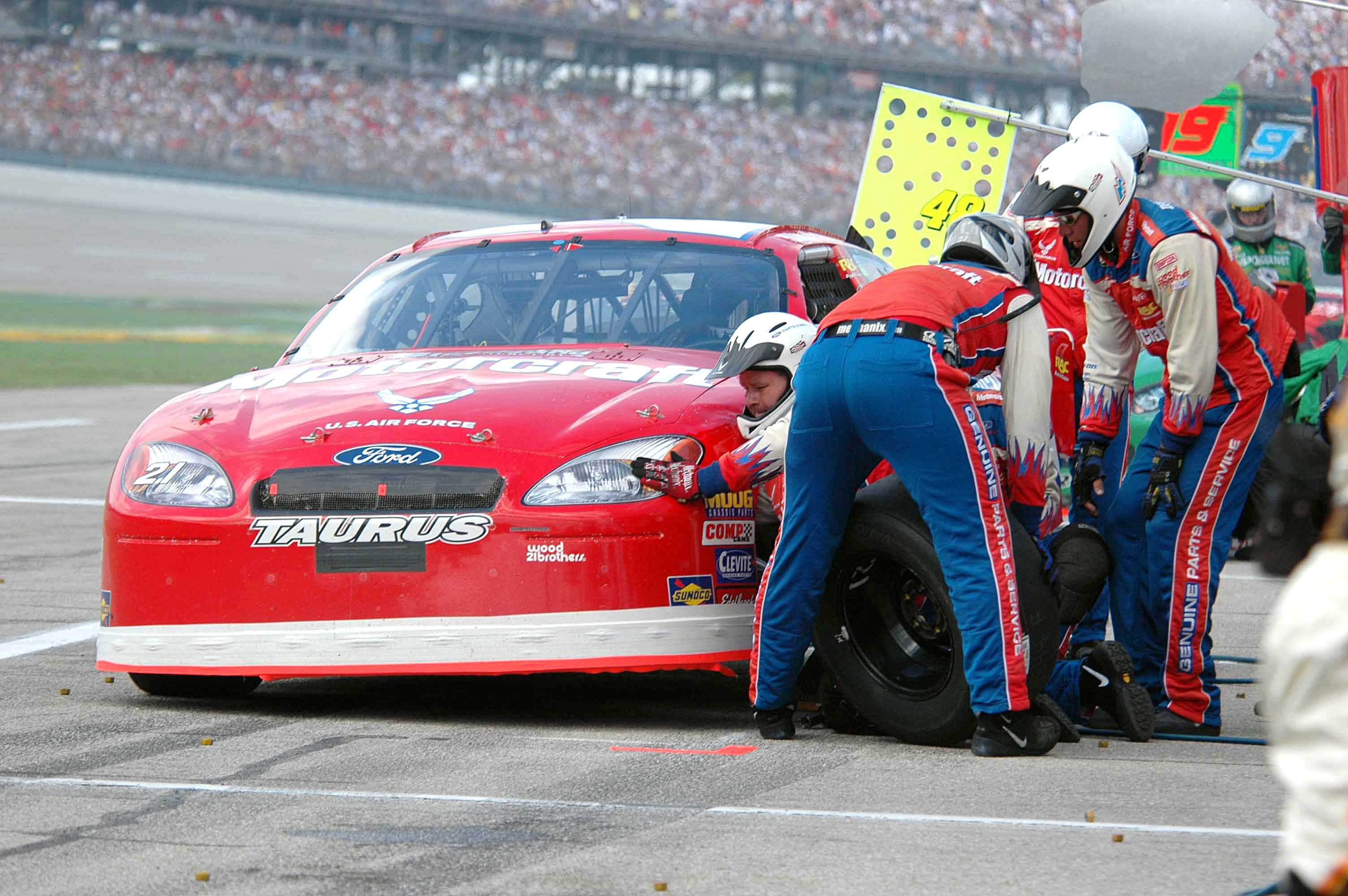
Ricky Rudd, driver of the Wood Brothers Racing No. 21 car, stops for a pit stop. He finished 18th, leading 5 laps during the race

Fin	St	#	Driver	Make	Laps	Led	Status	Points
1	2	88	Dale Jarrett	Ford	190	2	running	185
2	4	20	Tony Stewart (CC)	Chevy	190	65	running	180
3	11	17	Matt Kenseth (CC)	Ford	190	23	running	170
4	3	12	Ryan Newman (CC)	Dodge	190	12	running	165
5	10	99	Carl Edwards (CC)	Ford	190	2	running	160
6	27	25	Brian Vickers	Chevy	190	6	running	155
7	16	40	Sterling Marlin	Dodge	190	0	running	146
8	21	97	Kurt Busch (CC)	Ford	190	7	running	147
9	5	01	Joe Nemechek	Chevy	190	1	running	143
10	42	29	Kevin Harvick	Chevy	190	6	running	139
11	6	18	Bobby Labonte	Chevy	190	0	running	130
12	14	42	Jamie McMurray	Dodge	190	38	running	132
13	28	9	Kasey Kahne	Dodge	190	0	running	124
14	32	19	Jeremy Mayfield (CC)	Dodge	190	1	running	126
15	30	07	Dave Blaney	Chevy	190	0	running	118
16	15	77	Travis Kvapil (R)	Dodge	190	1	running	120
17	36	22	Scott Wimmer	Dodge	190	0	running	112
18	29	21	Ricky Rudd	Ford	190	5	running	114
19	33	4	Mike Wallace	Chevy	190	1	running	111
20	31	32	Bobby Hamilton Jr.	Chevy	190	0	running	103
21	40	43	Jeff Green	Dodge	189	1	running	105
22	43	37	Tony Raines	Dodge	189	0	running	97
23	22	7	Robby Gordon	Chevy	189	0	running	94
24	38	45	Kyle Petty	Dodge	188	0	running	91
25	41	2	Rusty Wallace (CC)	Dodge	185	0	running	88
26	39	49	Ken Schrader	Dodge	183	1	crash	90
27	8	16	Greg Biffle (CC)	Ford	172	0	running	82
28	17	1	Martin Truex Jr.	Chevy	170	0	engine	79
29	19	11	J. J. Yeley	Chevy	165	1	running	81
30	37	66	Kevin Lepage	Ford	160	0	running	73
31	9	48	Jimmie Johnson (CC)	Chevy	158	3	running	75
32	23	0	Mike Bliss	Chevy	149	0	crash	67
33	13	5	Kyle Busch (R)	Chevy	146	0	engine	64
34	1	38	Elliott Sadler	Ford	128	9	running	66
35	18	31	Jeff Burton	Chevy	71	0	crash	58
36	7	10	Scott Riggs	Chevy	65	0	crash	55
37	12	24	Jeff Gordon	Chevy	65	0	crash	52
38	26	41	Casey Mears	Dodge	65	5	crash	54
39	34	33	Kerry Earnhardt	Chevy	57	0	crash	46
40	20	8	Dale Earnhardt Jr.	Chevy	19	0	crash	43
41	24	6	Mark Martin (CC)	Ford	19	0	crash	40
42	25	15	Michael Waltrip	Chevy	19	0	crash	37
43	35	00	Mike Skinner	Ford	19	0	crash	34
