= 2005 Pepsi 400 =

Race details
- Race 17 of 36 in the 2005 NASCAR Nextel Cup Series
- 2005 Pepsi 400 program cover
- Date: July 2, 2005
- Location: Daytona International Speedway in Daytona Beach, Florida
- Course: Permanent racing facility
- Course length: 2.5 miles (4.02 km)
- Distance: 160 laps, 400 mi (643.27 km)
- Weather: Temperatures reaching as low as 77 °F (25 °C); wind speeds up to 19 miles per hour (31 km/h)
- Average speed: 131.016 miles per hour (210.850 km/h)

Pole position
Driver	Tony Stewart	Joe Gibbs Racing

Most laps led
Driver	Tony Stewart	Joe Gibbs Racing
- Laps: 151

Winner
No. 20	Tony Stewart	Joe Gibbs Racing

Television in the United States
- Network: NBC
- Announcers: Bill Weber, Benny Parsons, Wally Dallenbach Jr.
- Nielsen ratings: 4.9

The 2005 Pepsi 400 was a NASCAR Nextel Cup Series event held on July 2, 2005, at Daytona International Speedway in Daytona Beach, Florida. Contested over 160 laps, Tony Stewart, driver of the No. 20 Joe Gibbs Racing Chevrolet, won the race from the pole position, and led the most laps.

United States Secretary of Defense Donald Rumsfeld was the grand marshal. Pop singer Jojo sang "The Star-Spangled Banner" prior to the event.

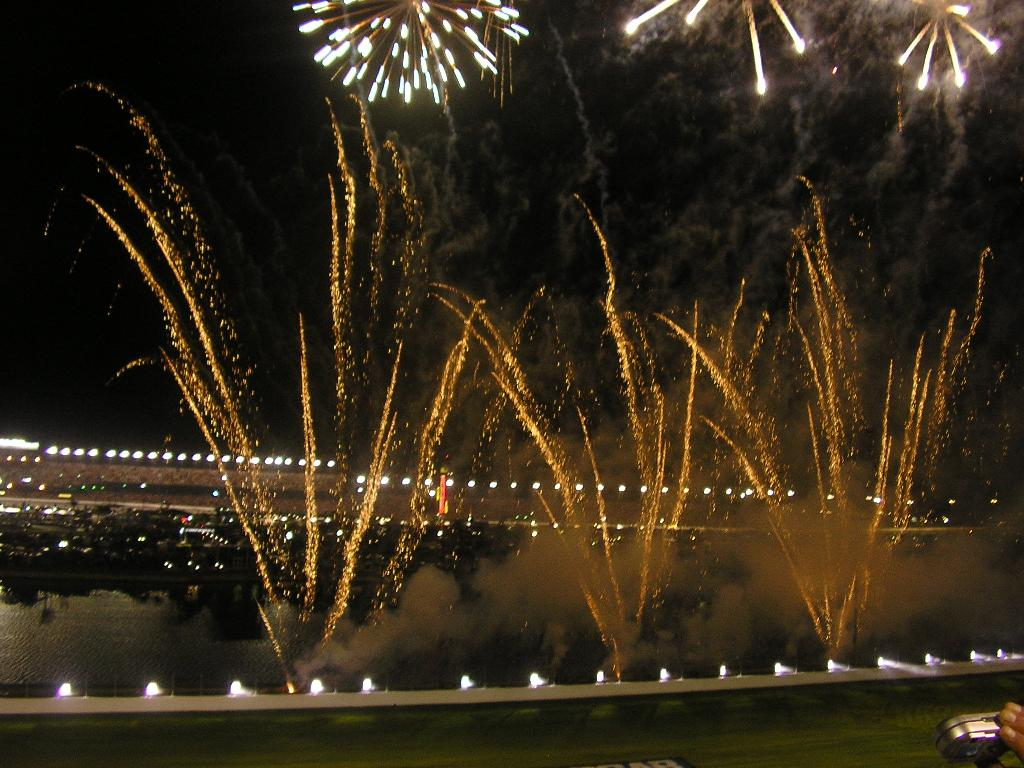
Fireworks after the conclusion of the race.

This was the last Pepsi 400 to be broadcast on NBC until 2015.

== Qualifying ==
Pos.	No.	Driver	Manufacturer	Sponsor	Avg. Speed	Time	Time behind leader
1	20	Tony Stewart	Chevrolet	The Home Depot	185.582	48.496	0.000
2	10	Scott Riggs	Chevrolet	Valvoline / Herbie: Fully Loaded	185.418	48.539	-0.043
3	48	Jimmie Johnson	Chevrolet	Lowe's	185.273	48.577	-0.081
4	36	Boris Said	Chevrolet	CENTRIX Financial	185.204	48.595	-0.099
5	01	Joe Nemechek	Chevrolet	U.S. Army	184.904	48.674	-0.178
6	38	Elliott Sadler	Ford	M&M's	184.468	48.789	-0.293
7	29	Kevin Harvick	Chevrolet	GM Goodwrench	184.468	48.789	-0.293
8	11	Jason Leffler	Chevrolet	FedEx Express	184.426	48.800	-0.304
9	2	Rusty Wallace	Dodge	Miller Lite	184.377	48.813	-0.317
10	33	Kerry Earnhardt	Chevrolet	Bass Pro Shops / Tracker	184.238	48.850	-0.354
11	7	Robby Gordon	Chevrolet	Fruit of the Loom	184.098	48.887	-0.391
12	32	Bobby Hamilton Jr	Chevrolet	Tide	184.053	48.899	-0.403
13	88	Dale Jarrett	Ford	UPS	184.045	48.901	-0.405
14	0	Mike Bliss	Chevrolet	NetZero Best Buy	184.045	48.901	-0.405
15	24	Jeff Gordon	Chevrolet	DuPont / Pepsi	183.932	48.931	-0.435
16	25	Brian Vickers	Chevrolet	ditech.com / GMAC	183.812	48.963	-0.467
17	15	Michael Waltrip	Chevrolet	NAPA Auto Parts	183.752	48.979	-0.483
18	16	Greg Biffle	Ford	National Guard	183.591	49.022	-0.526
19	9	Kasey Kahne	Dodge	Dodge Dealers / UAW	183.542	49.035	-0.539
20	09	Johnny Sauter	Dodge	Miccosukee Resort & Gaming	183.471	49.054	-0.558
21	92	Hermie Sadler	Chevrolet	Taco Bell	183.456	49.058	-0.562
22	18	Bobby Labonte	Chevrolet	Interstate Batteries	183.221	49.121	-0.625
23	6	Mark Martin	Ford	Viagra	183.150	49.140	-0.644
24	37	Kevin Lepage	Dodge	R&J Racing	183.094	49.155	-0.659
25	77	Travis Kvapil	Dodge	Kodak / Jasper Engines	183.057	49.165	-0.669
26	22	Scott Wimmer	Dodge	Caterpillar	183.050	49.167	-0.671
27	12	Ryan Newman	Dodge	Alltel	183.031	49.172	-0.676
28	97	Kurt Busch	Ford	Smirnoff Ice	182.968	49.189	-0.693
29	41	Casey Mears	Dodge	Target	182.878	49.213	-0.717
30	07	Dave Blaney	Chevrolet	Jack Daniel's	182.723	49.255	-0.759
31	19	Jeremy Mayfield	Dodge	Dodge Dealers / UAW / "Bad News Bears"	182.667	49.270	-0.774
32	5	Kyle Busch	Chevrolet	Kellogg's / Cheez-it	182.571	49.296	-0.800
33	42	Jamie McMurray	Dodge	Home123 Corp.	182.537	49.305	-0.809
34	99	Carl Edwards	Ford	Pennzoil Platinum	182.039	49.440	-0.944
35	21	Ricky Rudd	Ford	Motorcraft Genuine Parts	181.925	49.471	-0.975
36	45	Kyle Petty	Dodge	Georgia-Pacific / Stars & Stripes	181.759	49.516	-1.020
37	40	Sterling Marlin	Dodge	Prilosec OTC	181.558	49.571	-1.075
38	17	Matt Kenseth	Ford	DEWALT Power Tools	181.437	49.604	-1.108
39	8	Dale Earnhardt Jr	Chevrolet	Budweiser	181.148	49.683	-1.187
40	49	Ken Schrader	Dodge	Schwan's Home Service	181.068	49.705	-1.209
41	43	Jeff Green	Dodge	Cheerios / Chex Most Popular Driver	180.603	49.833	-1.337
42	31	Jeff Burton	Chevrolet	Cingular Wireless	180.267	49.926	-1.430
43	4	Mike Wallace	Chevrolet	Lucas Oil Products	183.023	49.174	-0.678
44	66	Mike Garvey	Ford	Jani-King / Peak Fitness		49.234	
45	00	Kenny Wallace	Dodge	Aaron's Dream Machine		49.419	

== Race ==
The race was delayed for two and a half hours because of rain. When the green flag was flown, it was flown with the yellow because track crews were still drying the track; the race officially began thirty minutes later. The official green flag was flown after 11 laps. During a green flag stop, Scott Riggs did not know that drivers in front of him were pitting, and when he attempted to swerve away from a slowing Jamie McMurray, whom Riggs stated did not tell him that he was pitting, Riggs ran into Mark Martin, and Kurt Busch, Casey Mears, Bobby Labonte, and Matt Kenseth are among the drivers collected in the wreck. On Lap 73, points leader Greg Biffle was hit by Michael Waltrip, who was spinning due to a cut tire. The remainder of the race was primarily dominated by Tony Stewart and Jimmie Johnson, who both led for the first 103 laps of the race. With 15 laps to go, the 2nd big one struck taking out 7 cars. It started when Carl Edwards hooked Kevin Harvick into Jeff Burton and both Harvick and Edwards spun. More cars spun in the tri-oval and going into turn 1 from going through the wet infield grass including Kyle Busch, Robby Gordon, Scott Wimmer, and Elliott Sadler.

With nine laps left, Stewart led McMurray; Kasey Kahne; Johnson; and Dale Earnhardt Jr. Kahne, who was running on old tires, fell out of contention. Stewart would lead for the remainder of the race, marking the first time Stewart won a restrictor plate race. Stewart led a total of 151 laps, which broke Cale Yarborough's record of 142 set in 1968. The race was also the first time Stewart performed his post-victory celebration of climbing the fence to the flag stand to collect the checkered flag.

== Results ==
POS	ST	#	DRIVER	SPONSOR / OWNER	CAR	LAPS	MONEY	STATUS	LED	PTS
1	1	20	Tony Stewart	The Home Depot (Joe Gibbs)	Chevrolet	160	368261	running	151	190
2	33	42	Jamie McMurray	Home123 Corp. (Chip Ganassi)	Dodge	160	201750	running	0	170
3	39	8	Dale Earnhardt Jr.	Budweiser (Dale Earnhardt, Inc.)	Chevrolet	160	207108	running	0	165
4	9	2	Rusty Wallace	Miller Lite (Roger Penske)	Dodge	160	159608	running	0	160
5	13	88	Dale Jarrett	UPS (Yates Racing)	Ford	160	157683	running	1	160
6	3	48	Jimmie Johnson	Lowe's (Rick Hendrick)	Chevrolet	160	156416	running	0	150
7	15	24	Jeff Gordon	DuPont / Pepsi (Rick Hendrick)	Chevrolet	160	151361	running	0	146
8	43	4	Mike Wallace	Lucas Oil Products (Larry McClure)	Chevrolet	160	110400	running	0	142
9	38	17	Matt Kenseth	DeWalt Power Tools (Jack Roush)	Ford	160	145036	running	0	138
10	40	49	Ken Schrader	Schwan's Home Service (Beth Ann Morgenthau)	Dodge	160	99075	running	0	134
11	42	31	Jeff Burton	Cingular Wireless (Richard Childress)	Chevrolet	160	126120	running	0	130
12	31	19	Jeremy Mayfield	Dodge Dealers / UAW / Bad News Bears (Ray Evernham)	Dodge	160	122545	running	0	127
13	35	21	Ricky Rudd	Motorcraft Genuine Parts (Wood Brothers)	Ford	160	123289	running	0	124
14	27	12	Ryan Newman	Alltel (Roger Penske)	Dodge	160	135341	running	0	121
15	5	01	Joe Nemechek	U.S. Army (Nelson Bowers)	Chevrolet	160	121058	running	0	118
16	19	9	Kasey Kahne	Dodge Dealers / UAW (Ray Evernham)	Dodge	160	124700	running	3	120
17	20	09	Johnny Sauter	Miccosukee Gaming & Resorts (James Finch)	Dodge	160	88175	running	0	112
18	8	11	Jason Leffler	FedEx Express (Joe Gibbs)	Chevrolet	160	91050	running	1	114
19	36	45	Kyle Petty	Georgia-Pacific / Stars & Stripes (Petty Enterprises)	Dodge	160	106358	running	0	106
20	14	0	Mike Bliss	NetZero / Best Buy (Gene Haas)	Chevrolet	160	91400	running	0	103
21	6	38	Elliott Sadler	M&M's (Yates Racing)	Ford	160	125216	running	4	105
22	37	40	Sterling Marlin	Prilosec OTC (Chip Ganassi)	Dodge	160	115808	running	0	97
23	25	77	Travis Kvapil	Kodak / Jasper Engines (Doug Bawel)	Dodge	160	96625	running	0	94
24	7	29	Kevin Harvick	GM Goodwrench (Richard Childress)	Chevrolet	160	131186	running	0	91
25	24	37	Kevin Lepage	R&J Racing (John Carter)	Dodge	160	86150	running	0	88
26	11	7	Robby Gordon	Fruit of the Loom (Robby Gordon)	Chevrolet	160	85000	running	0	85
27	30	07	Dave Blaney	Jack Daniel's (Richard Childress)	Chevrolet	159	92350	running	0	82
28	4	36	Boris Said	Centrix Financial (Bob Sutton)	Chevrolet	159	80725	running	0	79
29	16	25	Brian Vickers	GMAC / ditech.com (Rick Hendrick)	Chevrolet	158	91000	running	0	76
30	21	92	Hermie Sadler	Taco Bell (Bob Jenkins)	Chevrolet	156	80825	running	0	73
31	32	5	Kyle Busch	Kellogg's / Cheez-it (Rick Hendrick)	Chevrolet	146	88150	crash	0	70
32	26	22	Scott Wimmer	Caterpillar (Bill Davis)	Dodge	146	102183	crash	0	67
33	34	99	Carl Edwards	Pennzoil Platinum (Jack Roush)	Ford	146	98850	crash	0	64
34	41	43	Jeff Green	Chex Most Popular Driver (Petty Enterprises)	Dodge	141	108711	running	0	61
35	22	18	Bobby Labonte	Interstate Batteries (Joe Gibbs)	Chevrolet	134	114215	running	0	58
36	18	16	Greg Biffle	National Guard (Jack Roush)	Ford	129	97475	running	0	55
37	28	97	Kurt Busch	Smirnoff Ice (Jack Roush)	Ford	102	131750	running	0	52
38	12	32	Bobby Hamilton Jr.	Tide (Cal Wells)	Chevrolet	101	90833	crash	0	49
39	23	6	Mark Martin	Viagra (Jack Roush)	Ford	88	97050	running	0	46
40	17	15	Michael Waltrip	NAPA Auto Parts (Dale Earnhardt, Inc.)	Chevrolet	87	106114	crash	0	43
41	2	10	Scott Riggs	Valvoline / Herbie: Fully Loaded (James Rocco)	Chevrolet	64	97372	running	0	40
42	10	33	Kerry Earnhardt	Bass Pro Shops / Tracker (Richard Childress)	Chevrolet	53	78665	brakes	0	37
43	29	41	Casey Mears	Target (Chip Ganassi)	Dodge	35	86874	crash	0	34
POS	NAME	NBR	SPONSOR	OWNER	CAR					
44	Mike Garvey	66	Jani-King / Peak Fitness	Jeff Stec	Ford					
45	Kenny Wallace	00	Aaron's Dream Machine	Bill Davis	Dodge					
WD	Dan Pardus	73	ARC Dehooker	Ed Raabe	Chevrolet					
WD	Morgan Shepherd	89	Cornerstone Bancard / Victory in Jesus	Morgan Shepherd	Dodge					

== Standings after the race ==
Pos	Driver	Points
1	Jimmie Johnson	2378
2	Greg Biffle	2305
3	Tony Stewart	2242
4	Elliott Sadler	2178
5	Rusty Wallace	2173

Previous race: 2005 Dodge/Save Mart 350	Nextel Cup Series; 2005 season	Next race: 2005 USG Sheetrock 400
