= GMAC ResCap =

Defunct American bank

GMAC ResCap, Inc.
- Type: Subsidiary
- Industry: Financial services
- Founded: 1982; 44 years ago
- Defunct: December 17, 2013
- Fate: Chapter 11 bankruptcy and liquidation
- Headquarters: Minneapolis, Minnesota
- Products: Mortgage loans
- Parent: Ally Financial

GMAC ResCap, Inc., earlier Residential Funding Company LLC and Residential Capital Corporation, was a residential mortgage loan originator and servicer based in Minneapolis, Minnesota. It was a subsidiary of GMAC (now Ally Financial). As a result of its exposure to subprime lending during the subprime mortgage crisis, the company filed for bankruptcy protection in 2012 and underwent liquidation in December 2013.

== History ==
Residential Funding Company LLC was formed in 1982 as a subsidiary of Northwest Bank and began operations in 1986. The company was acquired by GMAC Mortgage Corporation in 1990.

In 2005, GMAC (now Ally Financial), a subsidiary of General Motors, transferred ownership of GMAC Mortgage Corporation and Residential Funding Corporation (GMAC-RFC) to Residential Capital Corporation (ResCap) and contributed $2 billion of equity.

By of the end of the next year, the company had $48 billion, or 76% of its mortgage portfolio invested in subprime loans.

The company eliminated 1,000 jobs in January 2007, and an additional 3,000 positions that October.

In May 2008, the company reported concerns that it may not meet its financial and debt obligations. Two months later, the company completed a $60 billion refinancing.

On April 17, 2012, the company missed an interest payment. Following a missed interest payment in the previous month, the company filed for the company filed for a pre-packaged bankruptcy in May 2012. The filing included the separation of the company from its parent, Ally Financial.

The company's Plan of Reorganization was approved by the bankruptcy court in December of the following year.

== Litigation ==
In 2008, the New Jersey Carpenters Health Fund filed a securities class action lawsuit against the company and the underwriters of residential mortgage-backed securities issued by its affiliates. The plaintiffs alleged that the securities' prospectuses and registration statements contained misleading information and failed to adequately disclose risks, therefore violating federal securities laws. While the case against Citigroup, Goldman Sachs Group and UBS AG was settled for $235 million in 2015, the company separately settled the claims against it for $100 million.
