= Ditech =

Former financial services company

Ditech Financial
- Trade name: DHCP
- Type: Private
- Industry: Mortgage lending, Financial services, Mortgage servicing
- Founded: 1995; 31 years ago Costa Mesa, California, U.S.
- Defunct: 2019; 7 years ago
- Fate: Bankruptcy
- Headquarters: Fort Washington, Pennsylvania, U.S.
- Area served: United States
- Key people: Tom Marano (President); Ritesh Chaturbedi (Chief Operating Officer)
- Products: Fixed rate mortgages, Adjustable-rate mortgages, FHA loans, HARP loans, VA loans
- Number of employees: 4,900
- Parent: Ditech Holding Corporation
- Website: www.ditech.com

Ditech Financial LLC (formerly ditech Mortgage and Green Tree Servicing) was a provider of home loan, loan servicing and refinance products to consumers and institutional partners in the U.S.

In May 2014, Ditech announced its re-entry to the national housing market after it “disappeared” from the marketplace for five years during the subprime mortgage crisis in the late 2000s. It also announced a corporate re-branding with its servicing affiliate, Green Tree Servicing, which took place in 2015. It filed for bankruptcy in 2019.

== History ==
=== 1995–2000 ===
In 1995, John Paul Reddam founded Ditech Funding Corporation in Costa Mesa, California. The company's name was derived from the phrase “direct technology.” Ditech became one of the first lenders to offer mortgages to the public online and via a toll-free number. In April 1995, Reddam began originating, selling, and servicing mortgage loans tied to the prime interest rate. Reddam's business model quickly extended Ditech's operating territory to seven states by the end of the 1995, and 46 states by the end of 1996. Ditech's rapid growth was fueled in part by an aggressive marketing campaign that included a national television commercial featuring a frustrated loan officer (played by Ron Michaelson) who would mutter, "Lost another loan to Ditech," after losing business to the company. Ditech became a household name as a result of the commercials.

In 1999, Ditech was acquired by GMAC (now Ally Financial), then owned by General Motors. GMAC Mortgage renamed DiTech “ditech.com.” Reddam left the company in 2000.

=== 2005–2012 ===
In 2005, Ditech was organized as a business unit of Residential Capital, LLC (often referred to as "ResCap"), which controlled mortgage-related subsidiaries owned by General Motors Corporation.

Ditech pioneered 125 percent loans that allowed mortgage loan applicants to borrow more than properties were worth. The loans were also low-documentation mortgages, or stated income loans, and many borrowers falsified their incomes.

Powers introduced "People Are Smart," an advertising campaign that leveraged GMAC's reputation as a responsible lender and stressed the importance of making prudent decisions based on expert advice provided by ditech.com loan consultants.

In February 2010, GMAC relocated ditech.com offices from Costa Mesa to Fort Washington, PA. In May 2010, GMAC changed its name to Ally Financial.

In 2012, during the mortgage crisis, Ally took its residential lending unit into bankruptcy in order to pay back the U.S. Treasury following its acceptance of bailout funds. In November 2012, Ditech was formed from assets of the estate of GMAC ResCap during the bankruptcy proceeding.

== Purchase by Walter Investment ==
In March 2013, Ditech was acquired by Walter Investment Management Co. from Ally Financial, the former GMAC ResCap. Following the acquisition, Ditech used the name of Walter's Green Tree Servicing subsidiary to originate loans for regulatory and licensing reasons. DT Holdings, Ditech's parent company, is a subsidiary of Walter Investment Management.

The company resumed originating loans using the Ditech name in March 2014. The brand had effectively “disappeared” from the marketplace for five years during the mortgage crisis, and the company decided to bring Ditech name back. In May 2014, Ditech announced its re-entry to the U.S. housing market.

== Corporate Re-brand ==
In March 2015, Ditech, along with Walter Investment affiliate Green Tree Servicing, announced the two would undergo a co-branding effort to become "Ditech Financial, A Walter Company," bringing Walter's origination and servicing entities together under one, recognizable brand name. The transition concluded in the second half of 2015.

== Lending ==
=== Products ===
Ditech offered a range of home loan and refinance options. Home loan options include fixed rate, adjustable rate and FHA loans. Refinancing options included fixed rate, adjustable rate and FHA loans, as well as special financing programs such as HARP with expanded loan-to-value limits for qualified applicants. The company will no longer provide nonprime mortgages.

=== Institutional partner strategy ===
In May 2014, Ditech launched a co-branding and joint-venture initiative with more than 600 institutional partners that provide mortgage and refinance loans to their customers. The strategy encompasses direct consumer lending and correspondent lending. Institutional partners can price, lock and deliver individual loans through the Ditech website.

Also in May 2014, Ditech announced new correspondent banking products and services including MyCommunityMortgage, FHA Program, Expanded LMPI, and Freddie Only. In June 2014, Ditech's correspondent lending division began focusing on services for community banks and credit unions, offering their customers access to Ditech's technology, underwriting, processing, servicing and marketing expertise.

== Advertising ==
Ditech is well known for television commercials that aired during the 2000s. They featured a nefarious loan officer, played by actor Ron Michaelson, repeating the catchphrase "Lost another loan to Ditech" written by writer, producer and director Ken Roberts, who created the Ditech television and radio commercials from 1995 to 2007. In May 2007, the company introduced a new marketing campaign, adding the tagline "People Are Smart" and including the signature line Home financing by GMAC to further help distinguish the Ditech brand from direct-to-consumer lenders of questionable repute. Ditech had immensely high unaided brand awareness and customer satisfaction, but many people mistakenly thought Ditech was a subprime lender.

On September 11, 2001, in the U.S., a Ditech commercial was airing on the CNN television channel when it was interrupted for an announcement that a plane had struck one of Twin Towers of the World Trade Center in New York City. This would begin CNN's ongoing live coverage of the September 11 attacks.

Ditech held a sponsorship in the NASCAR Nextel Cup Series from 2004 to 2007, prominently appearing on the #25 Chevrolet driven by Brian Vickers. The company held sponsorships on Hendrick's part-time #44 car, as well as the #87 car on Busch Series level. DiTech also sponsored Kevin Harvick for Stewart–Haas Racing from 2015 to 2016. Harvick would win at New Hampshire with DiTech on his Chevrolet SS.

== Bankruptcy ==
In February 2019, Ditech filed for bankruptcy for the second time in as many years. Later that year, the company's forward mortgage servicing and originations business Ditech Financial LLC was acquired by New Residential Investment Corp. and their reverse mortgage business, Reverse Mortgage Solutions Inc., was acquired by Mortgage Assets Management LLC.
