= Florida Association of Stock Car Automobile Racing =

Florida stock car racing league

- Sport: Stock cars
- Jurisdiction: Florida
- Abbreviation: FASCAR
- Regional affiliation: Southern United States
- Headquarters: New Smyrna Beach, Florida
- President: Robert Hart
- Other key staff: Kim Brown

Official website
- www.fascar.org
- (United States)

The Florida Association of Stock Car Automobile Racing (FASCAR) was considered to be the Florida state version of the National Association for Stock Car Automobile Racing or simply NASCAR for short. It was intended to be a developmental league where 14+-year old drivers develop their skills on stock cars to prepare for racing at the local level as well as higher divisions. Operating since the 1970s, series under the FASCAR umbrella have operated on three race tracks: Lake City Speedway (1/2 mile), New Smyrna Speedway (1/2 mile), and Orlando Speedworld (3/8 mile). FASCAR became defunct in 2013 when New Smyrna Speedway signed a deal to become a NASCAR Home Track.
