= Ally Financial =

American financial services company

Ally Financial Inc.

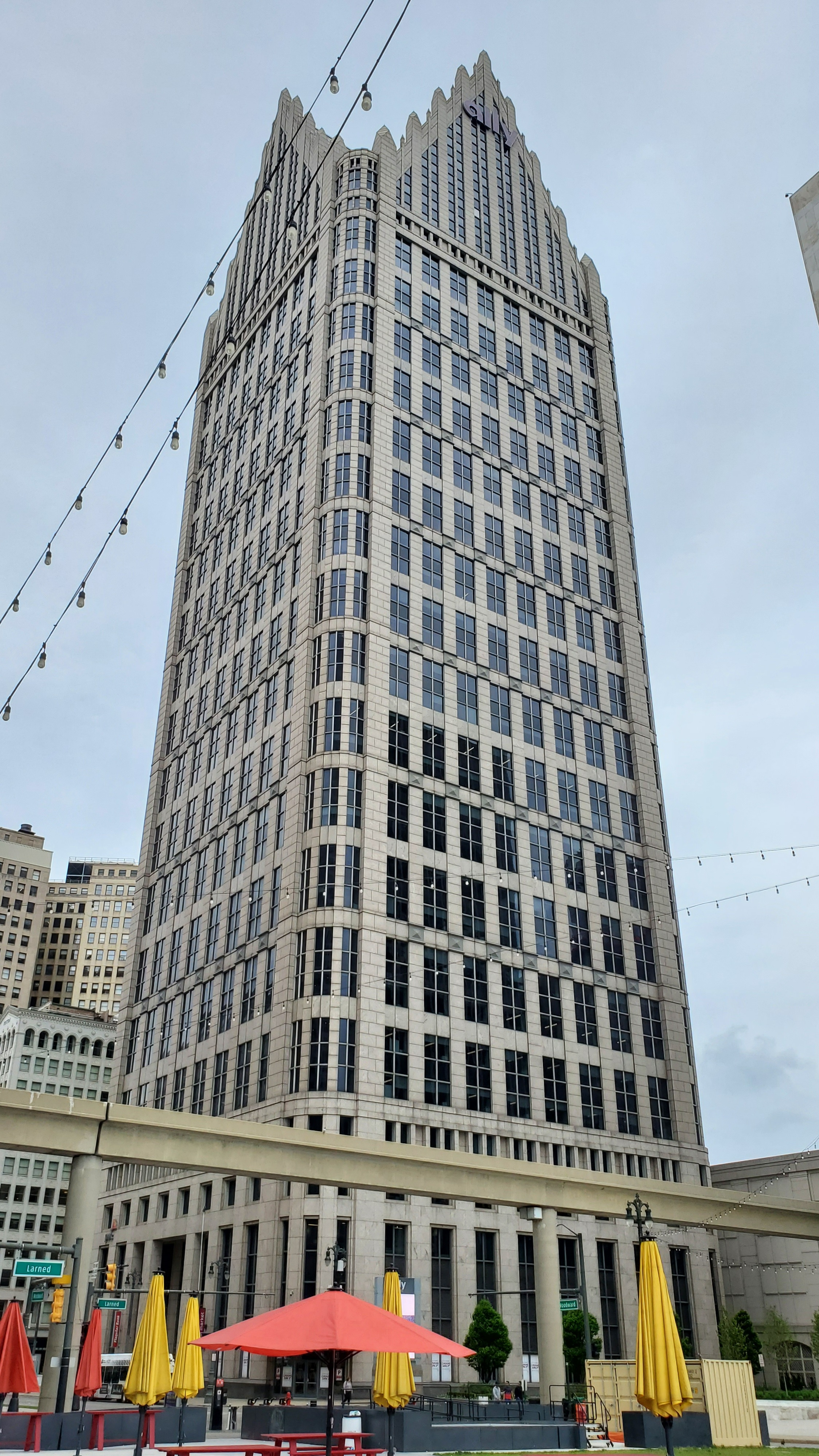
- Headquarters at Ally Detroit Center
- Formerly: GMAC Inc. (1919–2010)
- Type: Public
- Traded as: NYSE: ALLY; S&P 400 component
- Industry: Financial services
- Founded: 1919; 107 years ago (as General Motors Acceptance Corporation)
- Headquarters: Ally Detroit Center; Detroit, Michigan, United States (Ally Financial); Sandy, Utah, United States (Ally Bank); Ally Charlotte Center; Charlotte, North Carolina, United States (Corporate Center)
- Key people: Franklin W. Hobbs (chairman); Michael G. Rhodes (CEO); Russell E. Hutchinson (CFO)
- Services: Car finance Online banking Mortgage loans Stockbroker; Electronic trading platform
- Revenue: ▼US$7.914 billion (2025)
- Operating income: 2,342,000,000 United States dollar (2022)
- Net income: ▲US$852 million (2025)
- Total assets: ▲US$196.002 billion (2025)
- Total equity: ▲US$15.498 billion (2025)
- Number of employees: 10,300 (2025)
- Website: ally.com

Ally Financial Inc. (known as GMAC until 2010) is an American bank holding company incorporated in Delaware and headquartered at Ally Detroit Center in Detroit, Michigan. The company provides financial services including car finance, online banking via a direct bank, corporate lending, vehicle insurance, mortgage loans, and other related financing services such as installment sale and lease agreements.

Ally is one of the largest car finance companies in the US. It provided car financing and leasing for 4.0 million customers and originated 1.3 million car loans in 2025. It is on the list of largest banks in the United States by assets and has 3.5 million deposit customers with 6.5 million retail bank accounts. The company sold 573,000 vehicles in 2025 via its SmartAuction online marketplace for auto auctions, launched in 2000.

== History ==
=== 1919–1990 ===
The company was founded in 1919 by General Motors (GM) as the General Motors Acceptance Corporation (GMAC) to provide financing to automotive customers. In 1939, the company founded Motors Insurance Corporation and entered the vehicle insurance market.

In 1985, while GM was under the leadership of Roger Smith, who sought to diversify the company, GMAC formed GMAC Mortgage and acquired Colonial Mortgage as well as the servicing arm of Norwest Mortgage, which included an $11 billion mortgage portfolio.

=== 1991–2009 ===
In 1991, the company was forced to write-off $275 million in bad debt as part of a $436 million loss suffered from fraud committed by John McNamara, who ran a Ponzi scheme.

In 1998, the company formed GMAC Real Estate. In 1999, GMAC Mortgage acquired Ditech. In 2000, the company formed GMAC Bank, a direct bank. In 2005, the company formed GMAC ResCap as a holding company for its mortgage operations.

In 2006, General Motors sold a 51% interest in GMAC to Cerberus Capital Management, a private equity firm. Also that year, GMAC sold a controlling interest of GMAC Commercial Holdings (its real estate division renamed Capmark) to Goldman Sachs, Kohlberg Kravis Roberts, and Five Mile Capital Partners. GMAC Real Estate was sold to Brookfield Asset Management. In 2009, Capmark filed for bankruptcy and its North American loan origination and servicing business was acquired by Berkadia, a joint venture of Leucadia National and Berkshire Hathaway.

On December 24, 2008, the Federal Reserve accepted the company's application to become a bank holding company. In January 2009, the company closed Nuvell Financial Services, its subprime lending division.

As a result of losses in GMAC ResCap, a subsidiary of the company, the United States Department of the Treasury invested $17.2 billion in the company in 2008–2009. The Treasury sold its last stake in the company in 2014, recovering $19.6 billion from its $17.2 billion investment.

In April 2009, the bank announced plans to move its Charlotte office from Ballantyne to 106,525 square feet (9,896.5 m^{2}) on four floors of 440 South Church, with possible expansion later. At the time, the bank had 265 Charlotte employees in three business units.

In May 2009, GMAC Bank was rebranded as Ally Bank.

=== 2010–2019 ===
In May 2010, GMAC re-branded itself as Ally Financial.

In September 2010, the company sold its resort finance business to Centerbridge Partners.

In 2012, the company sold its Canadian banking operations to Royal Bank of Canada for $3.8 billion. In April 2014, it became a public company via an initial public offering. In 2015, it moved its headquarters to One Detroit Center, which was subsequently renamed Ally Detroit Center. In June 2016, the company acquired TradeKing, a stockbrokerage, for $275 million, which was re-branded as Ally Invest.

Ally re-entered the mortgage business in May 2016 but stopped making new mortgage loans in January 2025.

In October 2019, Ally acquired Health Credit Services, which provided financing for healthcare treatments. It was sold to Synchrony Financial in March 2024.

=== 2020–present ===
On May 3, 2021, Ally began occupying 725,000 square feet at Ally Charlotte Center.

In December 2021, Ally acquired Fair Square Financial, a credit card company, for $750 million. It was sold to CardWorks in April 2025.

== Sponsorships ==
In 2022, Ally committed to reach equal spending in paid advertising across women's and men's sports programming over the next five years.

=== Motorsports ===
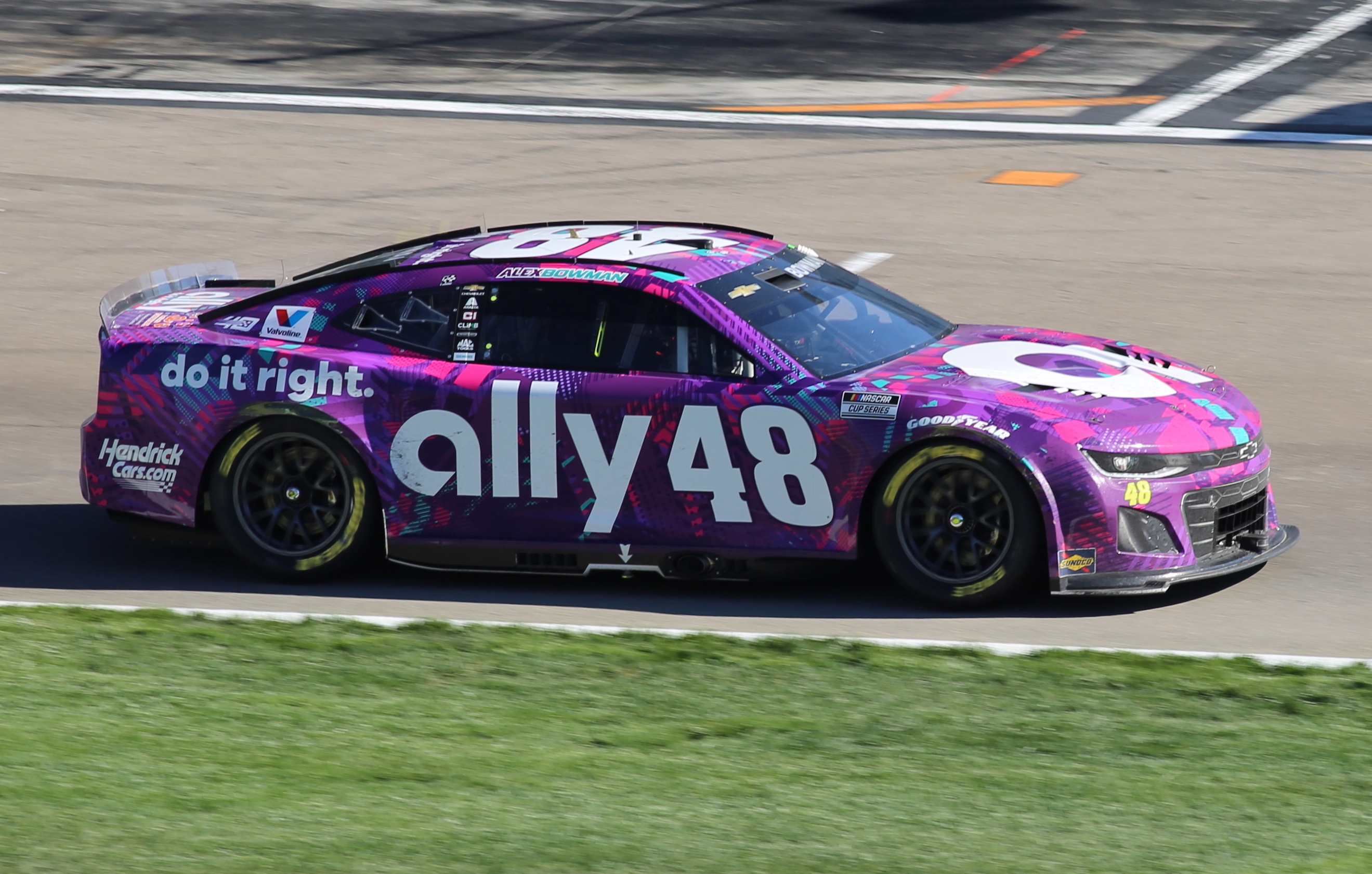
Alex Bowman's Ally-sponsored NASCAR Cup car in 2024

==== NASCAR ====
In 2023, Ally became the official consumer bank of NASCAR and NASCAR-owned tracks.

Hendrick Motorsports has been closely linked to Ally and its predecessor GMAC. Jack Sprague, Ricky Hendrick, Brian Vickers, and Casey Mears had GMAC as a primary sponsor between 1998 and 2007. Jimmie Johnson was sponsored by Ally in 2019 and 2020, after which the sponsorship transferred to Alex Bowman starting in 2021.

Ally also held the naming rights to the Cup Series' race at Nashville Superspeedway from 2021 to 2024.

==== Other ====
In 2021, Johnson, Kamui Kobayashi, and Simon Pagenaud raced an Action Express Racing sports car sponsored by Ally. Mike Rockenfeller was also on the team for that year's 24 Hours of Daytona.

=== Title sponsorships ===
- The Ally Challenge, sponsored since 2018.
- Time Dealer of the Year award, sponsored since 2015.
- National Women's Soccer League, sponsored since 2021. National Women's Soccer League Players Association, sponsored since 2022.
- ACC women's basketball tournament, sponsored since 2023.
- Charlotte FC of Major League Soccer, sponsored since 2020.
- Rocket League Championship Series, sponsored since 2023.
- Miami International Auto Show, sponsored from 2014-2016.
- Detroit Clutch of the Professional Women's Hockey League since 2026.

== Legal issues ==
=== 2013 discrimination settlement ===
In December 2013, the Consumer Financial Protection Bureau (CFPB) and United States Department of Justice ordered the company to pay $80 million in consumer monetary damages and $18 million in civil penalties after determining that 235,000 minority borrowers paid higher interest rates for auto loans originated between April 2011 and December 2013 because of the company's discriminatory pricing system. The higher rates resulted from the company's specific policy of allowing dealers to charge, at their discretion, a "dealer markup" above Ally's established "buy rate" and then compensating dealers based on the markup. Ally provided an incentive for dealers to charge higher rates, in violation of the Equal Credit Opportunity Act.
